= 2022–23 BSC Young Boys season =

BSC Young Boys
2022–23 season
- Chairman: Hanspeter Kienberger
- Manager: Raphaël Wicky
- Stadium: Wankdorf Stadium
- Swiss Super League: 1st
- Swiss Cup: Winners
- UEFA Europa Conference League: Play-off round
- Top goalscorer: League: Jean-Pierre Nsame (21); All: Jean-Pierre Nsame (30)
Home colours	Away colours

The 2022–23 season was the 98th season in the history of BSC Young Boys and their 27th consecutive season in the top flight. The club participated in Swiss Super League, Swiss Cup and UEFA Europa Conference League.

== Players ==
As of 14 February 2023

Note: Flags indicate national team as defined under FIFA eligibility rules; some limited exceptions apply. Players may hold more than one non-FIFA nationality.

No.	Pos.	Nation	Player
1	GK	SUI	Anthony Racioppi
4	DF	SUI	Aurèle Amenda
5	DF	SUI	Cédric Zesiger
7	MF	SUI	Filip Ugrinic
11	FW	SUI	Cedric Itten
13	DF	GUI	Mohamed Ali Camara
14	MF	ZAM	Miguel Chaiwa
15	FW	COD	Meschak Elia
16	MF	SUI	Christian Fassnacht
17	DF	SUI	Kevin Rüegg (on loan from Hellas Verona)
18	FW	CMR	Jean-Pierre Nsame
20	MF	SEN	Cheikh Niasse
21	DF	SUI	Ulisses Garcia

No.	Pos.	Nation	Player
22	MF	KOS	Donat Rrudhani
23	DF	SUI	Loris Benito
24	DF	SUI	Quentin Maceiras
26	GK	SUI	David von Ballmoos
27	DF	SUI	Lewin Blum
28	DF	SUI	Fabian Lustenberger (captain)
29	MF	SUI	Kastriot Imeri
30	MF	SUI	Sandro Lauper
32	MF	SUI	Fabian Rieder
40	GK	SUI	Dario Marzino
61	GK	SUI	Leandro Zbinden
77	FW	SUI	Joël Monteiro
—	GK	SUI	Marvin Keller

=== Out on loan ===
Note: Flags indicate national team as defined under FIFA eligibility rules; some limited exceptions apply. Players may hold more than one non-FIFA nationality.

No.	Pos.	Nation	Player
—	FW	SUI	Felix Mambimbi (at Cambuur until 30 June 2023)
—	MF	SUI	Alexandre Jankewitz (at Thun until 30 June 2023)
—	FW	SUI	Yannick Toure (at Thun until 30 June 2023)

No.	Pos.	Nation	Player
—	FW	SUI	Mischa Eberhard (at Aarau until 30 June 2023)
—	FW	SUI	Nico Maier (at Wil until 30 June 2023)
—	MF	SWE	Noah Persson (at Mjällby until 30 June 2023)

== Transfers ==
=== In ===
No.	Pos.	Player	Transferred from	Fee	Date	Source
—	MF	(Switzerland) Filip Ugrinic	(Switzerland) FC Luzern	Free	1 July 2022	
—	MF	(Zambia) Miguel Chaiwa	(Zambia) FC Shamuel	Free	1 July 2022	

=== Out ===
Pos.	Player	Transferred to	Fee	Date	Source
FW	(France) Wilfried Kanga	(Germany) Hertha BSC	€4,000,000	30 July 2022	

== Pre-season and friendlies ==
Win Draw Loss Fixtures

22 June 2022 Burkhalter Cup	Breitenrain (Switzerland)	0–1	(Switzerland) Young Boys	Bern, Switzerland
17:30 CEST (UTC+2)			Rieder 28'	Stadium: Sportplatz Spitalacker

22 June 2022 Burkhalter Cup	Young Boys (Switzerland)	0–0	(Switzerland) Yverdon Sport	Bern, Switzerland
18:30 CEST (UTC+2)				Stadium: Sportplatz Spitalacker

28 June 2022 Friendly	Young Boys (Switzerland)	2–1	(Switzerland) Neuchâtel Xamax	Gstaad, Switzerland
16:00 CEST (UTC+2)	Rieder 16'; Touré 74'			Stadium: Sportplatz Schützebode

1 July 2022 Friendly	Young Boys (Switzerland)	2–2	(Switzerland) Stade Lausanne-Ouchy	Gstaad, Switzerland
17:00 CEST (UTC+2)	Monteiro 10'; Fassnacht 88'		Hadji 12'; Alounga 69'	Stadium: Sportplatz Schützebode

5 July 2022 Global Tour for Peace	Young Boys (Switzerland)	0–0	(Ukraine) Dynamo Kyiv	Bern, Switzerland
20:00 CEST (UTC+2)				Stadium: Stadion Wankdorf

9 July 2022 Friendly	Young Boys (Switzerland)	7–0	(Switzerland) Schaffhausen	Bern, Switzerland
14:00 CEST (UTC+2)				Stadium: Stadion Wankdorf

9 July 2022 Friendly	Young Boys (Switzerland)	1–1	(Germany) Greuther Fürth	Bern, Switzerland
17:30 CEST (UTC+2)	Elia 61'		Hrgota 70' (pen.)	Stadium: Stadion Wankdorf

17 December 2022 Friendly	Darmstadt 98 (Germany)	2–0	(Switzerland) Young Boys	Darmstadt, Germany
18:00 CET (UTC+1)				Stadium: Merck-Stadion am Böllenfalltor

22 December 2022 Friendly	SC Freiburg (Germany)	1–1	(Switzerland) Young Boys	Freiburg, Germany
14:30 CET (UTC+1)				Stadium: Europa-Park Stadion

11 January 2023 Friendly	Young Boys (Switzerland)	3–0	(Hungary) Puskás Akadémia	Estepona, Spain
14:00 CET (UTC+1)	Fassnacht 51'; Itten 64'; Monteiro 74'			Stadium: Estadio Municipal Francisco Muñoz Pérez

14 January 2023 Friendly	Young Boys (Switzerland)	2–0	(Switzerland) Thun	Bern, Switzerland
11:00 CET (UTC+1)	Monteiro 37'; Rrudhani 49'			Stadium: Stadion Wankdorf

14 January 2023 Friendly	Young Boys (Switzerland)	0–0	(Liechtenstein) Vaduz	Bern, Switzerland
14:00 CET (UTC+1)				Stadium: Stadion Wankdorf

== Competitions ==
=== Overall record ===
Competition	First match	Last match	Starting round	Final position	Record							
Competition	First match	Last match	Starting round	Final position	Pld	W	D	L	GF	GA	GD	Win %
Swiss Super League	6 August 2022	29 May 2023	Matchday 1	Winners	36	21	11	4	82	30	+52	58.33
Swiss Cup	21 August 2022	4 June 2023	Round 1	Winners	6	6	0	0	28	6	+22	100.00
UEFA Europa Conference League	21 July 2022	25 August 2022	Second qualifying round	Play-off round	6	5	0	1	10	1	+9	83.33
Total					48	32	11	5	120	37	+83	66.67

Source: Soccerway

=== Swiss Super League ===
==== League table ====
Pos	Team	Pld	W	D	L	GF	GA	GD	Pts	Qualification or relegation
1	Young Boys (C)	36	21	11	4	82	30	+52	74	Qualification for the Champions League play-off round
2	Servette	36	14	16	6	53	48	+5	58	Qualification for the Champions League second qualifying round
3	Lugano	36	15	12	9	59	47	+12	57	Qualification for the Europa League play-off round
4	Luzern	36	13	11	12	56	52	+4	50	Qualification for the Europa Conference League second qualifying round
5	Basel	36	11	14	11	51	50	+1	47	Qualification for the Europa Conference League second qualifying round

Source: Swiss Super League
Rules for classification: 1) Points; 2) Goal difference; 3) Goals scored; 4) Head-to-head goal difference; 5) Away goals scored; 6) Draw.
(C) Champions

==== Results summary ====
Overall								Home						Away					
Pld	W	D	L	GF	GA	GD	Pts	W	D	L	GF	GA	GD	W	D	L	GF	GA	GD
36	21	11	4	82	30	+52	74	14	4	0	54	11	+43	7	7	4	28	19	+9

Source: Swiss Super League

==== Results by round ====
Round	1	2	3	4	5	6	7	8	9	10	11	12	13	14	15	16	17	18	19	20	21	22	23	24	25	26	27	28	29	30	31	32	33	34	35	36
Ground	H	A	H	A	H	A	A	H	A	H	A	A	H	H	A	H	A	H	A	H	H	A	A	H	H	A	H	A	H	A	H	A	H	A	A	H
Result	W	W	D	D	W	W	L	W	W	W	D	W	D	W	D	W	W	W	D	W	D	D	D	W	W	L	W	D	W	L	W	W	D	W	L	W
Position	1	1	1	1	1	1	1	1	1	1	1	1	1	1	1	1	1	1	1	1	1	1	1	1	1	1	1	1	1	1	1	1	1	1	1	1

Source: Swiss Super League
A = Away; H = Home; W = Win; D = Draw; L = Loss

==== Matches ====
The league fixtures were announced on 17 June 2022.

16 July 2022 1	Young Boys	4–0	Zürich	Bern
18:00 CEST	Zesiger (yellow card) 3'; Garcia (yellow card) 37'; Elia (yellow card) 37'; Sierro (yellow card) 54'; Fassnacht 62'; Itten 77'; Rieder 80'; Kanga 85'	Report	Gnonto (yellow card) 50'; Kamberi (yellow card) 61'; Rohner (yellow card) 73'	Stadium: Stadion Wankdorf; Attendance: 31,120; Referee: Sandro Schärer

24 July 2022 2	Sion	0–3	Young Boys	Sion
16:30 CEST	Stojilković (yellow card) 11'; Cavaré (yellow card) 29'	Report	Kanga 2' 6' (yellow card) 29'; Blum (yellow card) 73'; Nsame (yellow card) 82'; Ngamaleu 88'	Stadium: Stade Tourbillon; Attendance: 8,500; Referee: Alain Bieri

31 July 2022 3	Young Boys	1–1	Grasshopper	Bern
16:30 CEST	Niasse (yellow card) 27'; Nsame 31'	Report	Seko (yellow card) 44'; Dadashov 49' (yellow card) 90+4'; Morandi (yellow card) 80'; André Moreira (yellow card) 87'	Stadium: Stadion Wankdorf; Attendance: 26,210; Referee: Sandro Schärer

7 August 2022 4	Basel	0–0	Young Boys	Basel
16:30 CEST	Burger (yellow card) 16'; Hitz (yellow card) 63'; Ndoye (yellow card) 90+3'	Report	Nsame (yellow card) 27'	Stadium: St. Jakob-Park; Attendance: 26,547; Referee: Lukas Fähndrich

14 August 2022 5	Young Boys	3–0	Servette	Bern
16:30 CEST	Zesiger (yellow card) 6'; Rieder 29'; Ngamaleu (yellow card) 48'; Elia 60'; Blum (yellow card) 63'; Itten 78'	Report	Rouiller (yellow card) 10'	Stadium: Stadion Wankdorf; Attendance: 26,212; Referee: Fedayi San

28 August 2022 6	Winterthur	1–5	Young Boys	Winterthur
16:30 CEST	Buess 3' (pen.); Abedini (yellow card) 39'; Lekaj (yellow card) 85'	Report	Camara (yellow card) 9'; Elia 17'; Zesiger (yellow card) 45'; Nsame 50'; Ugrinic 52'; Itten 69' 76'	Stadium: Stadion Schützenwiese; Attendance: 8,400; Referee: Anojen Kanagasingam

4 September 2022 7	St. Gallen	2–1	Young Boys	St. Gallen
16:30 CEST	Witzig (yellow card) 17'; Jordi Quintillà (yellow card) 29'; Guindo 54' (yellow card) 68'; Schmidt 64'	Report	Garcia (red card) 21'; Itten (yellow card) 29'; Zesiger (yellow card) 46' (yellow-red card) 72' (goal) 62'	Stadium: Kybunpark; Attendance: 19,200; Referee: Fedayi San

11 September 2022 8	Young Boys	3–0	Lugano	Bern
16:30 CEST	Nsame 2' 63'; Niasse (yellow card) 8'; Itten 41' (pen.); Camara (yellow card) 74'; Rieder (yellow card) 80'	Report	Steffen (yellow card) 41'; Mahou (yellow card) 90+3'; Arigoni (yellow card) 90+4'	Stadium: Stadion Wankdorf; Attendance: 31,120; Referee: Sven Wolfensberger

2 October 2022 9	Luzern	1–2	Young Boys	Luzern
16:30 CEST	Meyer (yellow card) 6'; Beloko (yellow card) 9'; Schürpf 18'; Dräger (yellow card) 36'; Beka (yellow card) 83'	Report	Rieder (yellow card) 13'; Elia 15'; Nsame 90+5'	Stadium: Swissporarena; Attendance: 14,870; Referee: Esther Staubli

8 October 2022 10	Young Boys	2–1	St. Gallen	Bern
20:30 CEST	Nsame 13'; Ugrinic (yellow card) 81'; Stergiou 87' (o.g.)	Report	Görtler (yellow card) 21'; Chadrac Akolo 38'	Stadium: Stadion Wankdorf; Attendance: 26,525; Referee: Urs Schnyder

16 October 2022 11	Zürich	0–0	Young Boys	Zürich
16:30 CEST	Santini (yellow card) 35'	Report	Niasse (yellow card) 21'; Fassnacht (yellow card) 63'	Stadium: Stadion Letzigrund; Attendance: 14,565; Referee: Fedayi San

19 October 2022 12	Lugano	1–4	Young Boys	Lugano
20:30 CEST	Ziegler 25'; Celar (yellow card) 37'; Doumbia (yellow card) 64'; Daprelà (yellow card) 79'; Bislimi (yellow card) 86'	Report	Nsame 21'; Rüegg (yellow card) 40'; Niasse (yellow card) 57'; Lustenberger (yellow card) 60'; Garcia 68'; Imeri 80'; Itten (yellow card) 90+1' (goal) 90+5'	Stadium: Stadio di Cornaredo; Attendance: 3,307; Referee: Sandro Schärer

22 October 2022 13	Young Boys	1–1	Sion	Bern
18:00 CEST	Itten (yellow card) 48'; Nsame 64' (pen.)	Report	Saintini (yellow card) 23'; Balotelli 53' (pen.); Schmied (yellow card) 64'; Cyprien (yellow card) 90+1'	Stadium: Stadion Wankdorf; Attendance: 27,767; Referee: Urs Schnyder

30 October 2022 14	Young Boys	3–1	Basel	Bern
16:30 CEST	Rieder 7' (yellow card) 66'; Elia 23'; Garcia (yellow card) 44'; Blum (yellow card) 75'; Sierro 90+3'	Report	Xhaka (yellow card) 28'; Fink 52'; Millar (yellow card) 60'; Males (yellow card) 73'; Lang (red card) 88'	Stadium: Stadion Wankdorf; Attendance: 31,120; Referee: Sandro Schärer

6 November 2022 15	Servette	0–0	Young Boys	Lancy
14:15 CET	Rodelin (yellow card) 81'	Report	Itten (red card) 18'; Zesiger (yellow card) 66'; Rieder (yellow card) 88'	Stadium: Stade de Genève; Attendance: 16,214; Referee: Urs Schnyder

13 November 2022 16	Young Boys	3–0	Luzern	Bern
16:30 CET	Fassnacht 5'; Nsame 32'; Lauper 70'	Report	Beloko (yellow card) 1'	Stadium: Stadion Wankdorf; Attendance: 31,120; Referee: Alain Bieri

21 January 2023 17	Grasshopper	1–2	Young Boys	Zürich
20:30 CET	Dadashov (yellow card) 86'; Filipe de Carvalho 90+4'; André Moreira (yellow card) 90+8'	Report	Lustenberger (yellow card) 37'; Fassnacht 38'; Niasse (yellow card) 57'; Imeri 78'; Elia (red card) 90+8'	Stadium: Stadion Letzigrund; Attendance: 5,181; Referee: Luca Cibelli

29 January 2023 18	Young Boys	5–1	Winterthur	Bern
14:15 CET	Nsame 17' 52' 79'; Niasse (yellow card) 22'; Itten 24' 27'; Blum (yellow card) 31'; Rieder (yellow card) 74'	Report	Burkart (yellow card) 7'; Ramizi 40' (pen.); Ltaief (yellow card) 85'	Stadium: Stadion Wankdorf; Attendance: 27,310; Referee: Sven Wolfensberger

5 February 2023 19	Luzern	1–1	Young Boys	Luzern
16:30 CET	Simani (yellow card) 9'; Schürpf 33'; Beloko (yellow card) 64'	Report	Garcia (yellow card) 27'; Fassnacht (yellow card) 31'; Maceiras (yellow card) 40'; Itten 64' (pen.); Rrudhani (yellow card) 90'	Stadium: Swissporarena; Attendance: 11,809; Referee: Sandro Schärer (Buttikon); Assistant referees: (VAR) (Switzerland) Stefan Horisberger

12 February 2023 20	Young Boys	5–1	St. Gallen	Stadion Wankdorf, Bern
16:30 CET	Itten 12' 54' (pen.); Imeri 17'; Fassnacht 62'; Rieder 66' (pen.)	Report	Görtler 3'; Stergiou (yellow card) 65'	Attendance: 27,164; Referee: Urs Schnyder; Assistant referees: (VAR) (Switzerland) Stefan Horisberger

18 February 2023 21	Young Boys	1–1	Lugano	Stadion Wankdorf, Bern
20:30 CET	Zesiger (yellow card) 40'; Nsame 48'; Blum (yellow card) 75'	Report	Sabatini (yellow card) 19'; Valenzuela 38'; Steffen (yellow card) 45+2'	Attendance: 24,684; Referee: Luca Cibelli; Assistant referees: (VAR) (Switzerland) Fedayi San

25 February 2023 22	Zürich	2–2	Young Boys	Letzigrund, Zürich
20:30	Okita 40'; Kryeziu (yellow card) 49'; Tosin 75'	SFL summary	57' Monteiro; 84' Fassnacht	Attendance: 15,393; Referee: (Switzerland) Lukas Fähndrich; Assistant referees: (VAR) (Switzerland) Fedayi San

4 March 2023 23	Winterthur	1–1	Young Boys	Stadion Schützenwiese, Winterthur
18:00	Buess 62'	SFL summary	21' Elia; (yellow card) 62' Zesiger; (yellow card) 73' Fassnacht	Attendance: 8,400 (sold out); Referee: (Switzerland) Luca Piccolo; Assistant referees: (VAR) (Switzerland) Sascha Kever

11 March 2023 24	Young Boys	4–0	Sion	Kybunpark, St. Gallen
18:00	Elia 2'; Elia 38'; Blum (yellow card) 49'; Rieder 65'; Rieder 86'	SFL summary	(yellow card) 21' Chouaref	Attendance: 28,052; Referee: (Switzerland) Luca Cibelli; Assistant referees: (VAR) (Switzerland) Sascha Kever

19 March 2023 25	Young Boys	3–0	Basel	Stadion Wankdorf, Bern
16:30	Lustenberger (yellow card) 57'; Itten 76'; Garcia (yellow card) 78'; Itten 80'; Itten 89'; Zesiger (yellow card) 90+1'	SFL summary FCB report	(yellow card) 50' Calafiori; (yellow card) 79' Hitz	Attendance: 31,500 (sold out); Referee: (Switzerland) Lukas Fähndrich; Assistant referees: (VAR) (Switzerland) Sandro Schärer

1 April 2023 26	Servette	2–1	Young Boys	Stade de Genève, Geneva
18:00	Antunes (yellow card) 34'; Céspedes (yellow card) 56'; Bedia 69'; Pflücke 84'	SFL summary	(yellow card) 13' Rieder; 25' Nsame; (yellow card) 53' Nsame; (yellow card) 67' Amenda; (yellow card) 82' Blum	Attendance: 9,189; Referee: (Switzerland) Luca Cibelli; Assistant referees: (VAR) (Switzerland) Urs Schnyder

10 April 2023 27	Young Boys	2–0	Grasshopper	Wankdorf Stadion, Bern
16:30 CEST (UTC+2)	Rieder (yellow card) 46'; Zesiger (yellow card) 72'; Zesiger 73'; Nsame 88'	Report	(yellow card) 35' Ribeiro; (yellow card) 43' Shabani; (yellow card) 54' Seko; (yellow card) 81' Bolla	Attendance: 31,500; Referee: (Switzerland) Luca Piccolo; Assistant referees: (VAR) (Switzerland) Sandro Schärer

16 April 2023 28	Basel	1–1	Young Boys	St. Jakob-Park, Basel
16:30	Diouf (yellow card) 57'; Amdouni 68'; Fink (yellow card) 90'	SFV summary FCB report	8' Nsame; (yellow card) 31' Nsame; (yellow card) 51' Ugrinic	Attendance: 14,142; Referee: (Switzerland) Fedayi San (Gebenstorf); Assistant referees: (VAR) (Switzerland) Lukas Fähndrich
Note: The Muttenzerkurve (home fan sector) and the Gellertkurve (guest fan sector) were closed, due to the sanctions imposed following the riots after the cup semi-final match, ten days earlier. A minute of silence before the game in memory of the former player Roberto Frigerio.

22 April 2023 29	Young Boys	6–1	Servette	Stadion Wankdorf, Bern
20:30	Imeri 11'; Itten 13'; Fassnacht 16'; Niasse (yellow card) 26'; Rieder (yellow card) 29'; Itten 44'; Itten 57'; Frick 80' (o.g.)	SFL summary	62' Pflücke; (yellow card) 82' Pflücke	Attendance: 27,883; Referee: (Switzerland) Sandro Schärer; Assistant referees: (VAR) (Switzerland) Lukas Fähndrich

=== Swiss Cup ===
21 August 2022 Round 1	FC Schoenberg	1–10	Young Boys	Fribourg
17:00 CEST (UTC+2)	Da Silva 66'	Report	Jankewitz 8'; Nsame 18' (pen.), 28', 43'; Monteiro 40', 45'; Chaiwa 42'; Ugrinic 59'; Benito 59'; Imeri 71'	Stadium: Stade St-Léonard

17 September 2022 Round 2	Stade Lausanne Ouchy	0–1	Young Boys	Lausanne
18:30 CEST (UTC+2)	Florian Danho (yellow card) 86'	Report	Rüegg (yellow card) 44' (yellow-red card) 82'; Itten 66'; Lustenberger (yellow card) 71'	Stadium: Stade Olympique de la Pontaise; Referee: Esther Staubli

9 November 2022 Round 3	Lausanne-Sport	1–5	Young Boys	Lausanne
20:15 CEST (UTC+2)	Custodio 32' (yellow card) 80'; Dabanlı (yellow card) 54'; Sanches (yellow card) 84'	Report	Rrudhani 4' (yellow card) 41'; Amenda (yellow card) 9'; Blum 11'; Lauper (yellow card) 15'; Fassnacht 68'; Sierro 73'; Elia 85'	Stadium: Stade de la Tuilière; Attendance: 7,496; Referee: Luca Cibelli

28 February 2023 Quarter-finals	Thun	0–5	Young Boys	Thun
20:15 CET (UTC+1)	Sutter (yellow card) 62'; Bürki (yellow card) 89'	Report	5' Rieder; (yellow card) 58' Blum; 64' Itten; 66' Ugrinic; 76' Fassnacht; 83' Lauper	Stadium: Stockhorn Arena; Attendance: 10,014; Referee: Urs Schnyder

4 April 2023 Semi-finals	Basel	2–4	Young Boys	Basel
20:15 CET (UTC+1)	Hitz (yellow card) 5'; Vogel (yellow card) 29'; Pelmard (yellow card) 44'; Millar (yellow card) 53'; Males 57'; Ndoye 71' (yellow card) 90+2'	Report	3' (pen.), 63' Itten; 15' Rieder; (yellow card) 38' Garcia; (yellow card) 44' Lauper; 68' Elia; (yellow card) 83' Amenda	Stadium: St. Jakob Park; Attendance: 26,310; Referee: Urs Schnyder

4 June 2023 Final	Young Boys	3–2	Lugano	Bern
14:00 CET (UTC+1)	Nsame 20', 45+3'; Elia 85'	Report	Bottani 53'; Steffen 87'	Stadium: Stadion Wankdorf; Attendance: 31,500; Referee: Lukas Fähndrich

=== UEFA Europa Conference League ===
==== Second qualifying round ====
21 July 2022 First leg	Liepāja (Latvia)	0–1	(Switzerland) Young Boys	Liepāja, Latvia
17:00 EEST (UTC+3)		Report	Fassnacht 73'	Stadium: Daugava Stadium; Attendance: 3,734; Referee: David Munro (Scotland)

28 July 2022 Second leg	Young Boys (Switzerland)	3–0 (4–0 agg.)	(Latvia) Liepāja	Bern
20:00 CEST (UTC+2)	Nsame 2' (pen.); Rrudhani 41'; Niasse 72'	Report		Stadium: Stadion Wankdorf; Attendance: 14,112; Referee: Abdulkadir Bitigen (Turkey)

==== Third qualifying round ====
The draw for the third qualifying round was held on 18 July 2022.

4 August 2022 First leg	KuPS (Finland)	0–2	(Switzerland) Young Boys	Turku, Finland
19:00 EEST (UTC+3)		Report	Nsame 25' (pen.); Elia 40'	Stadium: Veritas Stadium; Attendance: 1,521; Referee: Gergő Bogár (Hungary)

11 August 2022 Second leg	Young Boys (Switzerland)	3–0 (5–0 agg.)	(Finland) KuPS	Bern
21:00 CEST (UTC+2)	Nsame 3', 57'; Sierro 40'	Report		Stadium: Stadion Wankdorf; Attendance: 14,059; Referee: Stéphanie Frappart (France)

==== Play-off round ====
The draw for the play-off round was held on 2 August 2022.

18 August 2022 First leg	Young Boys (Switzerland)	0–1	(Belgium) Anderlecht	Bern
19:00 CEST (UTC+2)		Report	Delcroix 57'	Stadium: Stadion Wankdorf; Attendance: 18,363; Referee: Aleksandar Stavrev (North Macedonia)

25 August 2022 Second leg	Anderlecht (Belgium)	0–1 (a.e.t.) (1–1 agg.) (3–1 p)	(Switzerland) Young Boys	Brussels, Belgium
20:00 CEST (UTC+2)		Report	Elia 26'	Stadium: Constant Vanden Stock Stadium; Attendance: 14,393; Referee: Serhiy Boyko (Ukraine)
	Penalties
	Hoedt (penalty scored); Stroeykens (penalty missed); Sadiki (penalty scored); Esposito (penalty scored)		(penalty scored) Rieder; (penalty missed) Rrudhani; (penalty missed) Imeri; (penalty missed) Lustenberger
