= 2023–24 BSC Young Boys season =

BSC Young Boys
2023–24 season
- Manager: Raphaël Wicky
- Stadium: Stadion Wankdorf
- Swiss Super League: 1st
- Swiss Cup: Quarter-finals
- UEFA Champions League: Group stage
- UEFA Europa League: Knockout round play-offs
- Top goalscorer: League: Joel Monteiro (12); All: Cedric Itten (13)
- Average home league attendance: 28,878
- All statistics correct as of 28 May 2024.

The 2023–24 season was BSC Young Boys' 126th season in existence and 23rd consecutive in the Swiss Super League. They also competed in the Swiss Cup, the UEFA Champions League and the UEFA Europa League.

== Players ==
=== First-team squad ===
As of 13 September 2023

Note: Flags indicate national team as defined under FIFA eligibility rules; some limited exceptions apply. Players may hold more than one non-FIFA nationality.

No.	Pos.	Nation	Player
1	GK	SUI	Anthony Racioppi
4	DF	SUI	Aurèle Amenda
7	MF	SUI	Filip Ugrinic
8	MF	POL	Łukasz Łakomy
9	FW	SUI	Cedric Itten
10	MF	SUI	Kastriot Imeri
11	MF	GAM	Ebrima Colley (on loan from Atalanta)
13	DF	GUI	Mohamed Ali Camara
14	MF	ZAM	Miguel Chaiwa
15	FW	COD	Meschak Elia
17	DF	GAM	Saidy Janko
18	FW	CMR	Jean-Pierre Nsame
19	DF	SWE	Noah Persson

No.	Pos.	Nation	Player
20	MF	SEN	Cheikh Niasse
21	DF	SUI	Ulisses Garcia
22	MF	KOS	Donat Rrudhani
23	DF	SUI	Loris Benito
26	GK	SUI	David von Ballmoos
27	DF	SUI	Lewin Blum
28	DF	SUI	Fabian Lustenberger (captain)
30	MF	SUI	Sandro Lauper
35	FW	CGO	Silvère Ganvoula
39	MF	SUI	Darian Males
40	GK	SUI	Dario Marzino
61	GK	SUI	Leandro Zbinden
77	FW	SUI	Joël Monteiro

=== Out on loan ===
Note: Flags indicate national team as defined under FIFA eligibility rules; some limited exceptions apply. Players may hold more than one non-FIFA nationality.

No.	Pos.	Nation	Player
—	GK	SUI	Marvin Keller (at Winterthur until 30 June 2024)
—	DF	SUI	Joel Bichsel (at Freiburg II until 30 June 2024)

No.	Pos.	Nation	Player
—	MF	SUI	Théo Golliard (at Vaduz until 30 June 2024)
—	MF	SUI	Alexandre Jankewitz (at Winterthur until 30 June 2024)

== Transfers ==
=== In ===
Pos.	Player	Transferred from	Fee	Date	Source
FW	(Republic of the Congo) Silvère Ganvoula	(Germany) VfL Bochum	Free	1 July 2023	
MF	(Poland) Łukasz Łakomy	(Poland) Zagłębie Lubin	€1,400,000	1 July 2023	
DF	(The Gambia) Saidy Janko	(Spain) Real Valladolid	€500,000	1 July 2023	
MF	(Switzerland) Darian Males	(Italy) Inter Milan	€2,000,000	19 July 2023	
MF	(The Gambia) Ebrima Colley	(Italy) Atalanta	Loan	1 September 2023	

=== Out ===
Pos.	Player	Transferred to	Fee	Date	Source
DF	(Switzerland) Cédric Zesiger	(Germany) VfL Wolfsburg	€5,000,000	1 July 2023	
MF	(Switzerland) Christian Fassnacht	(England) Norwich City	€3,000,000	25 July 2023	
MF	(Switzerland) Fabian Rieder	(France) Stade Rennais	€15,000,000	31 August 2023	

== Pre-season and friendlies ==
Win Draw Loss Fixtures

30 June 2023 Friendly	Young Boys (Switzerland)	1–1	(Switzerland) Breitenrain

30 June 2023 Friendly	Young Boys (Switzerland)	1–0	(Switzerland) Yverdon-Sport

4 July 2023 Friendly	Stade Lausanne-Ouchy (Switzerland)	0–5	(Switzerland) Young Boys

8 July 2023 Friendly	Young Boys (Switzerland)	4–2	(Germany) Hertha BSC	Biel/Bienne, Switzerland
16:00 CEST (UTC+2)	Łakomy 5', 50'; Joël Monteiro 28'; Dema 87'		Dárdai 71'; Kanga 81' (pen.)	Stadium: Tissot Arena

12 July 2023 Friendly	Young Boys (Switzerland)	3–3	(Ukraine) Dynamo Kyiv

15 July 2023 Friendly	Young Boys (Switzerland)	3–1	(Switzerland) Schaffhausen

15 July 2023 Friendly	Young Boys (Switzerland)	4–0	(Switzerland) Thun
	Fassnacht 8', 32'; Nsame 20'; Elia 55'

9 January 2024 Friendly	Young Boys (Switzerland)	4–3	(Switzerland) Sion	Bern
14:00				Stadium: Stadion Wankdorf

13 January 2024 Friendly	Young Boys (Switzerland)	3–2	(Liechtenstein) Vaduz	Bern
13:00	Eyamba 39'; Rrudhani 65'; Nsame 72'	Report	Isik 11'; Djokic 26'	Stadium: Stadion Wankdorf; Attendance: 500

13 January 2024 Friendly	Young Boys (Switzerland)	1–0	(Switzerland) Wil	Bern
16:00	Itten 12'; Ganvoula (penalty missed) 39'	Report		Stadium: Stadion Wankdorf; Attendance: 700

== Competitions ==
=== Overall record ===
Competition	First match	Last match	Starting round	Final position	Record							
Competition	First match	Last match	Starting round	Final position	Pld	W	D	L	GF	GA	GD	Win %
Swiss Super League	23 July 2023	May 2024	Matchday 1		24	15	6	3	51	22	+29	62.50
Swiss Cup	18 August 2023		Round 1		3	3	0	0	8	0	+8	100.00
UEFA Champions League	23 August 2023	13 December 2023	Play-off round	Group stage	8	2	2	4	10	13	−3	25.00
UEFA Europa League	15 February 2024		Knockout round play-offs		1	0	0	1	1	3	−2	0.00
Total					36	20	8	8	70	38	+32	55.56

Last updated: 18 February 2024
Source: Soccerway

=== Swiss Super League ===
==== League table ====
Pos	Team	Pld	W	D	L	GF	GA	GD	Pts	Qualification or relegation (Note: Teams played each other three times (33 matches), before the league was split into two groups (the top six and the bottom six).)
1	Young Boys (C)	38	23	8	7	76	34	+42	77	Qualification for the Champions League play-off round
2	Lugano	38	20	5	13	67	51	+16	65	Qualification for the Champions League second qualifying round
3	Servette	38	18	10	10	59	43	+16	64	Qualification for the Europa League third qualifying round (Note: Servette qualified for the Europa League third qualifying round as the 2023–24 Swiss Cup winners.)
4	Zürich	38	16	12	10	53	41	+12	60	Qualification for the Conference League second qualifying round
5	St. Gallen	38	16	9	13	60	51	+9	57	Qualification for the Conference League second qualifying round

Source: Swiss Super League
Rules for classification: 1) Points; 2) Goal difference; 3) Goals scored; 4) Head-to-head goal difference; 5) Head-to-head goals scored 6) Away goals scored; 7) Draw.
(C) Champions

==== Results summary ====
Overall								Home						Away					
Pld	W	D	L	GF	GA	GD	Pts	W	D	L	GF	GA	GD	W	D	L	GF	GA	GD
37	22	8	7	73	34	+39	74	14	2	2	47	13	+34	8	6	5	26	21	+5

Last updated: 20 May 2024.

==== Results by round ====
Round	1	2	3	4	5	6	7	8	9	10	11	12	13	14	15	16	17	18	19	20	21	22	23	24	25	26	27	28	29	30	31	32	33	34	35	36	37	38
Ground	H	A	H	A	H	A	H	A	A	H	H	A	A	H	A	H	A	A	H	A	H	A	A	H	H	A	H	A	A	H	A	H	A	A	H	H	A	H
Result	W	D	W	D	W	W	W	L	W	W	D	D	W	W	L	D	W	W	W	L	W	W	D	W	L	L	W	L	D	W	D	W	W	W	L	W	W	
Position	5	4	2	3	1	1	1	1	1	1	1	1	1	1	1	1	1	1	1	1	1	1	1	1	1	1	1	1	1	1	1	1	1	1	1	1	1	

Updated to match(es) played on 20 May 2024. Source:
A = Away; H = Home; W = Win; D = Draw; L = Loss; P = Postponed

==== Matches ====
23 July 2023 1	Young Boys	2–1	Lausanne-Sport	Bern
16:30 CEST (UTC+2)				Stadium: Stadion Wankdorf

30 July 2023 2	Yverdon-Sport	2–2	Young Boys	Yverdon-les-Bains
16:30 CEST (UTC+2)				Stadium: Stade Municipal

5 August 2023 3	Young Boys	5–2	Winterthur	Bern
18:00 CEST (UTC+2)				Stadium: Stadion Wankdorf

13 August 2023 4	Luzern	1–1	Young Boys	Lucerne
16:30 CEST (UTC+2)				Stadium: Swissporarena

3 September 2023 6	Servette	0–1	Young Boys	Lancy
14:15 CEST (UTC+2)				Stadium: Stade de Genève

24 September 2023 7	Young Boys	4–1	Lugano	Bern
16:30 CEST (UTC+2)				Stadium: Stadion Wankdorf

27 September 2023 8	St. Gallen	2–1	Young Boys	St. Gallen
20:30 CEST (UTC+2)				Stadium: Kybunpark

30 September 2023 9	Grasshoppers	0–1	Young Boys	Zürich
20:30 CEST (UTC+2)				Stadium: Letzigrund

8 October 2023 10	Young Boys	3–0	Basel	Bern
16:30 CEST (UTC+2)				Stadium: Stadion Wankdorf

21 October 2023 11	Young Boys	0–0	Zürich	Bern
18:00 CEST (UTC+2)				Stadium: Stadion Wankdorf

29 October 2023 12	Lugano	1–1	Young Boys	Lugano
16:30 CET (UTC+1)

4 November 2023 13	Winterthur	1–4	Young Boys	Winterthur
18:00 CET (UTC+1)				Stadium: Stadion Schützenwiese

11 November 2023 14	Young Boys	6–1	Luzern	Bern
20:30 CET (UTC+1)				Stadium: Stadion Wankdorf; Referee: Lionel Tschudi

25 November 2023 15	Zürich	3–1	Young Boys	Zürich
18:00 CET (UTC+1)				Stadium: Letzigrund; Referee: Alessandro Dudic

3 December 2023 16	Young Boys	1–1	Servette	Bern
16:30 CET (UTC+1)	Ganvoula 58'		Bedia 8'	Stadium: Stadion Wankdorf; Referee: Lionel Tschudi

6 December 2023 5	Young Boys	1–0	Stade Lausanne-Ouchy	Bern
20:30 CET (UTC+1)	Nsame (penalty missed) 31', 76'			Stadium: Stadion Wankdorf; Referee: Stefan Horisberger

9 December 2023 17	Young Boys	3–0	St. Gallen	Bern
18:00 CET (UTC+1)	Stanić 21' (o.g.); Nsame 33', 49'			Stadium: Stadion Wankdorf; Attendance: 28,886; Referee: Urs Schnyder

16 December 2023 18	Stade Lausanne-Ouchy	1–3	Young Boys	Lausanne
18:00 CET (UTC+1)	Kadima (yellow card) 68'; Ismaël Gharbi 77'; Mulaj (yellow card) 90+3'	Report	Males 10' 36'; Ganvoula 20' (yellow card) 47'; Garcia (yellow card) 90'	Stadium: Stade Olympique de la Pontaise; Attendance: 2,284; Referee: (Switzerland) Lukas Fähndrich

20 January 2024 19	Young Boys	1–0	Grasshopper	Bern
18:00 CET (UTC+1)	Rrudhani 73'	Report	Morandi (yellow card) 25'; Hammel (yellow card) 65'; Seko (yellow card) 90+2'	Stadium: Stadion Wankdorf; Attendance: 22,589; Referee: (Switzerland) Urs Schnyder

27 January 2024 20	Basel	1–0	Young Boys	Basel
20:30 CET (UTC+1)	Frei (yellow card) 9'; Kololli 13'; Renato Veiga (yellow card) 52'; Barry (yellow card) 90+2'; Schmid (yellow card) 90+3'	Report	Males (yellow card) 45'; Joël Monteiro (yellow card) 69'; Łakomy (yellow card) 73'; Amenda (yellow card) 90+2'	Stadium: St. Jakob-Park; Attendance: 26,410; Referee: (Switzerland) Fedayi San

30 January 2024 21	Young Boys	5–1	Yverdon-Sport	Bern
20:30 CET (UTC+1)	Łakomy (yellow card) 26'; Hadjam (yellow card) 32'; Rrudhani 33'; Itten 43'; Joël Monteiro 77' 87'; Males (yellow card) 82'; Lauper 90+4'	Report	Kevin Carlos 10'; Igor Liziero (yellow card) 66'	Stadium: Stadion Wankdorf; Attendance: 25,535; Referee: (Switzerland) Mirel Turkes

3 February 2024 22	Lausanne-Sport	0–1	Young Boys	Lausanne
18:00 CET (UTC+1)	Bernède (yellow card) 10'	Report	Colley 8'; Lustenberger (yellow card) 22'	Stadium: Stade de la Tuilière; Attendance: 6,024; Referee: (Switzerland) Stefan Horisberger

10 February 2024 23	Lugano	3–3	Young Boys	Lugano
20:30 CET (UTC+1)	Bislimi 45+1'; Hajrizi 56'; Celar 80' (pen.); Grgić (yellow card) 82'; Espinoza (yellow card) 87'	Report	Colley 8'; von Ballmoos (yellow card) 45+1'; Mvuka 52'; Camara (yellow card) 60'; Ugrinić 62'	Stadium: Cornaredo Stadium; Attendance: 2,824; Referee: (Switzerland) Nico Gianforte

18 February 2024 24	Young Boys	1–0	Stade Lausanne Ouchy	Bern
14:15 CET (UTC+1)	Ganvoula (yellow card) 51'; Mvuka (yellow card) 57'; Itten 70'; Blum (red card) 74'	Report	Mergim Qarri (yellow card) 23'; Ouédraogo (yellow card) 72'; Obexer (yellow card) 87'	Stadium: Stadion Wankdorf; Attendance: 26,470; Referee: (Switzerland) Esther Staubli

25 February 2024 25	Young Boys	0–1	Servette	Bern
16:30 CET (UTC+1)	Camara (yellow card) 45'	Report	Nishimura (yellow card) 7'; Antunes 42'	Stadium: Stadion Wankdorf; Attendance: 29,183; Referee: (Switzerland) Fedayi San

3 March 2024 26	Zürich	1–0	Young Boys	Zürich
16:30 CET (UTC+1)	Mathew 1'; Condé (yellow card) 6'; Danté (yellow card) 56'	Report	Colley (yellow card) 63'	Stadium: Letzigrund; Attendance: 17,261; Referee: (Switzerland) Lukas Fähndrich

10 March 2024 27	Young Boys	5–1	Basel	Bern
16:30 CET (UTC+1)	Joël Monteiro 2' 66'; Itten 11'; Camara (yellow card) 13'; Elia 16'; Hadjam 46' (yellow card) 82'; Niasse (yellow card) 48'	Report	Kololli (yellow card) 31'; Barry 70'	Stadium: Stadion Wankdorf; Attendance: 31,500; Referee: (Switzerland) Sandro Schärer

17 March 2024 28	Lausanne-Sport	2–0	Young Boys	Lausanne
16:30 CET (UTC+1)	Sène 30' (pen.) (yellow card) 66'; Dussenne 34' (yellow card) 90+4'	Report	Amenda (yellow card) 29'; Blum (yellow card) 34'; Camara (yellow card) 67'; Niasse (yellow card) 73'; Janko (yellow card) 87'	Stadium: Stade de la Tuilière; Attendance: 11,278; Referee: (Switzerland) Stefan Horisberger

1 April 2024 29	Yverdon-Sport	0–0	Young Boys	Yverdon-les-Bains
14:15 CET (UTC+1)	Tijani (yellow card) 35'; Aké (yellow card) 50'	Report	Joël Monteiro (yellow card) 61'; Persson (yellow card) 78'	Stadium: Stade Municipal; Attendance: 4,200; Referee: (Switzerland) Johannes von Mandach

4 April 2024 30	Young Boys	3–0	Grasshopper	Bern
20:30 CET (UTC+1)	Elia 6'; Ganvoula 18'; Joël Monteiro 21'	Report		Stadium: Stadion Wankdorf; Attendance: 29,071; Referee: (Switzerland) Fedayi San

7 April 2024 31	St. Gallen	2–2	Young Boys	St. Gallen
16:30 CET (UTC+1)	Stevanović 10'; Görtler 71'	Report	Niasse (yellow card) 47'; Ganvoula 79'; Mvuka 87'	Stadium: Kybunpark; Attendance: 18,917; Referee: (Switzerland) Fedayi San

14 April 2024 32	Young Boys	4–2	Luzern	Bern
16:30 CET (UTC+1)	Ganvoula 27'; Amenda (yellow card) 45+2'; Elia 47' (yellow card) 89'; Joël Monteiro 49' 53'; Hadjam (yellow card) 83'	Report	Kadák 3' 33'; Meyer (yellow card) 74'; Dorn (yellow card) 85'	Stadium: Stadion Wankdorf; Attendance: 31,500; Referee: (Switzerland) Lukas Fähndrich

21 April 2024 33	Winterthur	1–2	Young Boys	Winterthur
16:30 CET (UTC+1)	Ltaief (yellow card) 19'; Turkeš 81'	Report	Blum (yellow card) 19'; Joël Monteiro 70'; Łakomy 84'	Stadium: Stadion Schützenwiese; Attendance: 8,400; Referee: (Switzerland) Urs Schnyder

==== Championship Round ====
5 May 2024 34	Zürich	0-2	Young Boys	Zürich
16:30 CEST	Kamberi (yellow card) 44'; Condé (yellow card) 48' (yellow-red card) 48'; Reichmuth (yellow card) 76'; Boranijašević (yellow card) 83'; Afriyie (yellow card) 88'	Report	Ganvoula 42' (yellow card) 44'; Itten 54'	Stadium: Letzigrund; Attendance: 16,737; Referee: (Switzerland) Luca Cibelli

11 May 2024 35	Young Boys	0-1	Lugano	Bern
20:30 CEST	Lauper (yellow card) 4'; Niasse (yellow card) 64'	Report	Doumbia 12'; Bislimi (yellow card) 58'; Cimignani (yellow card) 76'; Sabbatini (yellow card) 83'	Stadium: Stadion Wankdorf; Attendance: 31,500; Referee: (Switzerland) Lukas Fähndrich

16 May 2024 36	Young Boys	3-1	St. Gallen	Bern
20:30 CEST	Camara (yellow card) 37'; Elia 51' (yellow card) 86'; Itten 71' 90+4'; Hadjam (yellow card) 78'; Blum (yellow card) 79'; von Ballmoos (yellow card) 89'	Report	Milošević 3'; Görtler (yellow card) 34'; Zanotti (yellow card) 50'	Stadium: Stadion Wankdorf; Attendance: 30,084; Referee: (Switzerland) Luca Cibelli

20 May 2024 37	Servette	0-1	Young Boys	Geneva
18:00 CEST		Report	Camara 73'; Niasse (yellow card) 87'	Stadium: Stade de Genève; Attendance: 13,224; Referee: (Switzerland) Lukas Fähndrich

25 May 2024 38	Young Boys	-	Winterthur	Bern
20:30 CEST				Stadium: Stadion Wankdorf

=== Swiss Cup ===
18 August 2023 Round 1	FC Breitenrain	0–5	Young Boys	Bern
19:30 CEST (UTC+2)			Lüthi 16'; Itten 55'; Imeri 62'; Nsame 69' (pen.), 84'	Stadium: Stadion Wankdorf; Attendance: 13,861; Referee: Stefan Horisberger

15 September 2023 Round 2	Neuchâtel Xamax	0–1	Young Boys	Neuchâtel
19:30 CEST (UTC+2)			Ganvoula 90'	Stadium: Stade de la Maladière; Attendance: 9,638; Referee: Esther Staubli

1 November 2023 Round 3	FC Rapperswil-Jona	0–2	Young Boys	Rapperswil
19:00 CET (UTC+1)			Nsame 4'; Janko 57'	Stadium: Stadion Grünfeld; Attendance: 3,150; Referee: Nico Gianforte

29 February 2024 Quarter-finals	Sion	2–1	Young Boys	Sion
20:30 CET	Chouaref 19'; Lavanchy (yellow card) 38'; Bouchlarhem (yellow card) 48'; Sorgić 64'	Report	Hadjam (yellow card) 45'; Ganvoula (yellow card) 70' (goal) 81'; Amenda (yellow card) 82'; von Ballmoos (yellow card) 87'; Lustenberger (yellow card) 88'	Stadium: Stade de Tourbillon; Attendance: 14,200; Referee: (Switzerland) Fedayi San

=== UEFA Champions League ===
==== Play-off round ====
The draw for the play-off round was held on 7 August 2023.

23 August 2023 First leg	Maccabi Haifa (Israel)	0–0	(Switzerland) Young Boys	Haifa
22:00 IST (UTC+3)		Report		Stadium: Sammy Ofer Stadium; Attendance: 29,864; Referee: Davide Massa (Italy)

29 August 2023 Second leg	Young Boys (Switzerland)	3–0 (3–0 agg.)	(Israel) Maccabi Haifa	Bern
21:00 CEST (UTC+2)	Itten 23'; Seck 28' (o.g.); Ugrinic 46'	Report		Stadium: Stadion Wankdorf; Attendance: 31,500; Referee: Slavko Vinčić (Slovenia)

==== Group stage ====
The draw for the group stage was held on 31 August 2023.

Pos	Team	Pld	W	D	L	GF	GA	GD	Pts	Qualification	MCI	RBL	YB	RSB
1	(England) Manchester City	6	6	0	0	18	7	+11	18	Advance to knockout phase	—	3–2	3–0	3–1
2	(Germany) RB Leipzig	6	4	0	2	13	10	+3	12	Advance to knockout phase	1–3	—	2–1	3–1
3	(Switzerland) Young Boys	6	1	1	4	7	13	−6	4	Transfer to Europa League	1–3	1–3	—	2–0
4	(Serbia) Red Star Belgrade	6	0	1	5	7	15	−8	1		2–3	1–2	2–2	—

Source: UEFA
Rules for classification: Group stage tiebreakers

19 September 2023 1	Young Boys (Switzerland)	1–3	(Germany) RB Leipzig	Bern
18:45 CEST (UTC+2)	Elia 33'	Report	Simakan 3'; Schlager 73'; Šeško 90+2'	Stadium: Wankdorf; Attendance: 31,500; Referee: Enea Jorgji (Albania)

4 October 2023 2	Red Star Belgrade (Serbia)	2–2	(Switzerland) Young Boys	Belgrade, Serbia
21:00	Ndiaye 35'; Bukari 88'	Report	Ugrinic 48'; Itten 61' (pen.)	Stadium: Rajko Mitić Stadium; Attendance: 47,201; Referee: Willie Collum (Scotland)

25 October 2023 3	Young Boys (Switzerland)	1–3	(England) Manchester City	Bern
21:00 CEST	Elia 52'	Report	Akanji 48'; Haaland 67' (pen.), 86'	Stadium: Wankdorf; Attendance: 31,500; Referee: Morten Krogh (Denmark)

7 November 2023 4	Manchester City (England)	3–0	(Switzerland) Young Boys	Manchester, England
20:00 GMT	Haaland 25' (pen.), 51'; Foden 45+1'	Report		Stadium: City of Manchester Stadium; Attendance: 51,049; Referee: Erik Lambrechts (Belgium)

28 November 2023 5	Young Boys (Switzerland)	2–0	(Serbia) Red Star Belgrade	Bern
21:00	Nedeljković 8' (o.g.); Blum 29'	Report		Stadium: Stadion Wankdorf; Attendance: 31,500; Referee: Danny Makkelie (Netherlands)

13 December 2023 6	RB Leipzig (Germany)	2–1	(Switzerland) Young Boys	Leipzig, Germany
18:45 CET (UTC+1)	Šeško 51'; Forsberg 56'	Report	Colley 53'	Stadium: Red Bull Arena; Attendance: 43,331; Referee: Manfredas Lukjančukas (Lithuania)

=== UEFA Europa League ===
==== Knockout phase ====
===== Knockout round play-offs =====
The draw for the knockout round play-offs was held on 18 December 2023.

15 February 2024 First leg	Young Boys (Switzerland)	1–3	(Portugal) Sporting CP	Bern
18:45	Ugrinic 42'		Amenda 31' (o.g.); Gyökeres 41' (pen.); Inácio 48'	Stadium: Stadion Wankdorf; Attendance: 31,500; Referee: Benoît Bastien (France)

22 February 2024 Second leg	Sporting CP (Portugal)	1–1 (4–2 agg.)	(Switzerland) Young Boys	Lisbon, Portugal
21:00	Gyökeres 13'	Report	Ganvoula 84' (pen.); Amenda (yellow card) 86'; Lustenberger (yellow card) 90+4'	Stadium: Estádio José Alvalade; Attendance: 29,393; Referee: (Slovakia) Ivan Kružliak
