= Lewin Blum =

Swiss footballer (born 2001)

Personal information
- Date of birth: 27 July 2001 (age 25)
- Place of birth: Rothrist, Switzerland
- Height: 1.81 m (5 ft 11 in)
- Position: Right-back

Team information
- Current team: Young Boys
- Number: 27

Youth career
- 2011–2012: FC Roggwil
- 2012–2018: Young Boys

Senior career*
Years	Team	Apps	(Gls)
2018–2024	Young Boys U21	17	(4)
2021–	Young Boys	112	(3)
2021–2022	→ Yverdon-Sport (loan)	17	(1)
2025–2026	→ Charleroi (loan)	32	(0)

International career^{‡}
2016	Switzerland U15	1	(0)
2018	Switzerland U18	1	(0)
2019–2020	Switzerland U19	3	(0)
2022–2023	Switzerland U21	11	(0)
- * Club domestic league appearances and goals as of 19 September 2026 ‡ National team caps and goals as of 1 July 2023

Lewin Blum (born 27 July 2001) is a Swiss professional footballer who plays as a right-back for Swiss Super League club Young Boys.

== Club career ==
A youth product of FC Roggwil, Blum moved to the youth academy of Young Boys in 2012 and worked his way up through their youth categories. He signed his first professional contract with Young Boys on 16 June 2021, and then went on loan with Yverdon-Sport for the 2021–22 season in the Swiss Challenge League. Halfway through the season, on 3 January 2022, Young Boys activated a clause to bring Blum back to their squad early. He made his professional debut with Young Boys in a 1–1 Swiss Super League tie with Lugano on 29 January 2022.

Blum was loaned out to the Belgian club Charleroi on 6 September 2025, with an option to buy.

== International career ==
Blum represented Switzerland at the 2023 UEFA European Under-21 Championship, where they reached quarterfinals.

== Career statistics ==
=== Club ===
As of match played 19 September 2026

Appearances and goals by club, season and competition
Club	Season	League			National Cup (Note: Includes Swiss Cup)		League Cup		Europe		Other		Total	
Club	Season	Division	Apps	Goals	Apps	Goals	Apps	Goals	Apps	Goals	Apps	Goals	Apps	Goals
Young Boys U21	2018–19	Swiss 1. Liga	1	0	—		—		—		—		1	0
Young Boys U21	2019–20	Swiss 1. Liga	8	1	—		—		—		—		8	1
Young Boys U21	2020–21	Swiss 1. Liga	7	3	—		—		—		—		7	3
Young Boys U21	Total		16	4	—		—		—		—		16	4
Yverdon Sport (loan)	2021-22	Swiss Challenge League	17	1	2	0	—		—		0	19	1	1
Young Boys	2021–22	Swiss Super League	16	0	—		—		—		0	0	16	0
Young Boys	2022–23	Swiss Super League	31	1	5	1	—		4 (Note: Appearances in UEFA Europa Conference League)	0	0	0	40	2
Young Boys	2023–24	Swiss Super League	28	0	4	0	—		7 (Note: Five appearances and one goal in UEFA Champions League, two appearances in UEFA Europa League)	1	0	0	39	1
Young Boys	2024–25	Swiss Super League	28	0	3	0	—		9 (Note: Appearances in UEFA Champions League)	0	0	0	40	0
Young Boys	2025–26	Swiss Super League	0	0	1	0	—		2 (Note: Appearances in UEFA Europa League)	0	—		3	0
Young Boys	2026–27	Swiss Super League	9	2	0	0	—		—		9	2		
Young Boys	Total		112	3	13	1	0	0	22	1	0	0	148	5
Royal Charleroi	2025–26	Belgian Pro League	32	0	4	0	—		—		—		36	0
Career total			177	8	19	1	0	0	22	1	0	0	218	10

== Honours ==
Young Boys

- Swiss Super League: 2022–23
- Swiss Cup: 2022–23
