= Marvin Keller (footballer) =

Swiss footballer (born 2002)

Personal information
- Date of birth: 3 July 2002 (age 24)
- Place of birth: London, England
- Height: 1.90 m (6 ft 3 in)
- Position: Goalkeeper

Team information
- Current team: Young Boys
- Number: 33

Youth career
- 2009–2019: Grasshoppers

Senior career*
Years	Team	Apps	(Gls)
2019–2021	Grasshoppers U21	16	(0)
2019–2021	Grasshoppers	0	(0)
2021–2023	FC Wil	50	(0)
2023–	Young Boys	70	(0)
2023–2024	→ Winterthur (loan)	31	(0)

International career^{‡}
2019	Switzerland U19	3	(0)
2022–2024	Switzerland U21	7	(0)
2026–	Switzerland	1	(0)
- * Club domestic league appearances and goals as of 19 September 2026 ‡ National team caps and goals as of 31 May 2026

Marvin Keller (born 3 July 2002) is a professional footballer who plays as a goalkeeper for Swiss club Young Boys. Born in England, he plays for the Switzerland national team.

== Club career ==
Keller began playing goalkeeper after his father bought him goalie gloves as a joke. He is a youth product of Grasshoppers, having joined their youth academy at the age of 7. He was promoted to their U21s in the 2019–20 season, and was called up to their bench as backup goalkeeper in the Swiss Challenge League. On 8 January 2020, he signed a professional contract with Grasshoppers until 2020 and was formally promoted to their senior team as third goalkeeper. After 12 years with Grasshoppers, he transferred to FC Wil on 8 June 2021. On 24 March 2022, he extended his contract with the club until 2024 after cementing the starting spot in the squad. He transferred to the Swiss Super League club Young Boys on 12 February 2023 after they activated his release clause after a season-ending injury to their starting goalkeeper David von Ballmoos. He made his professional debut with Young Boys in a 1–1 Swiss Super League tie with FC Zürich on 14 May 2023. He started 3 matches of the season as Grasshoppers won the 2023–24 Swiss Super League. He also started for Young Boys in the 2022–23 Swiss Cup final against FC Lugano on 4 June 2023 after the second goalkeeper Anthony Racioppi was out injured, and made crucial saves as his team won 3–2 to win the cup.

On 13 September 2023, Keller joined Winterthur on loan.

== International career ==
Born in London, England, Keller is of Swiss descent. He is a youth international for Switzerland, having played up to the Switzerland U21s.

Keller was called up to the senior Switzerland squad for the friendly matches against Mexico and the United States on 7 and 10 June 2025, respectively.

On 20 May 2026, Keller was selected in the 26-man squad for the 2026 FIFA World Cup.

== Career statistics ==
=== Club ===
As of match played 19 September 2026

Appearances and goals by club, season and competition
Club	Season	League			National cup		Europe		Other		Total	
Club	Season	Division	Apps	Goals	Apps	Goals	Apps	Goals	Apps	Goals	Apps	Goals
Wil	2021–22	Swiss Challenge League	30	0	0	0	—		—		30	0
Wil	2022–23	Swiss Challenge League	20	0	1	0	—		—		21	0
Wil	Total		50	0	1	0	—		—		51	0
Young Boys	2022–23	Swiss Super League	3	0	1	0	0	0	—		4	0
Young Boys	2024–25	Swiss Super League	21	0	2	0	6 (Note: Appearances in UEFA Champions League)	0	—		29	0
Young Boys	2025–26	Swiss Super League	38	0	1	0	10 (Note: Appearances in UEFA Europa League)	0	—		49	0
Young Boys	2026–27	Swiss Super League	8	0	0	0	—		—		8	0
Young Boys	Total		70	0	4	0	16	0	—		90	0
Winterthur (loan)	2023–24	Swiss Super League	31	0	3	0	—		—		34	0
Career total			151	0	8	0	16	0	0	0	175	0

=== International ===
As of match played 31 May 2026

Appearances and goals by national team and year
National team	Year	Apps	Goals
Switzerland	2026	1	0
Total		1	0

== Honours ==
Grasshoppers

- Swiss Challenge League: 2020–21

Young Boys

- Swiss Super League: 2022–23
- Swiss Cup: 2022–23
