= Meschak Elia =

Congolese footballer (born 1997)

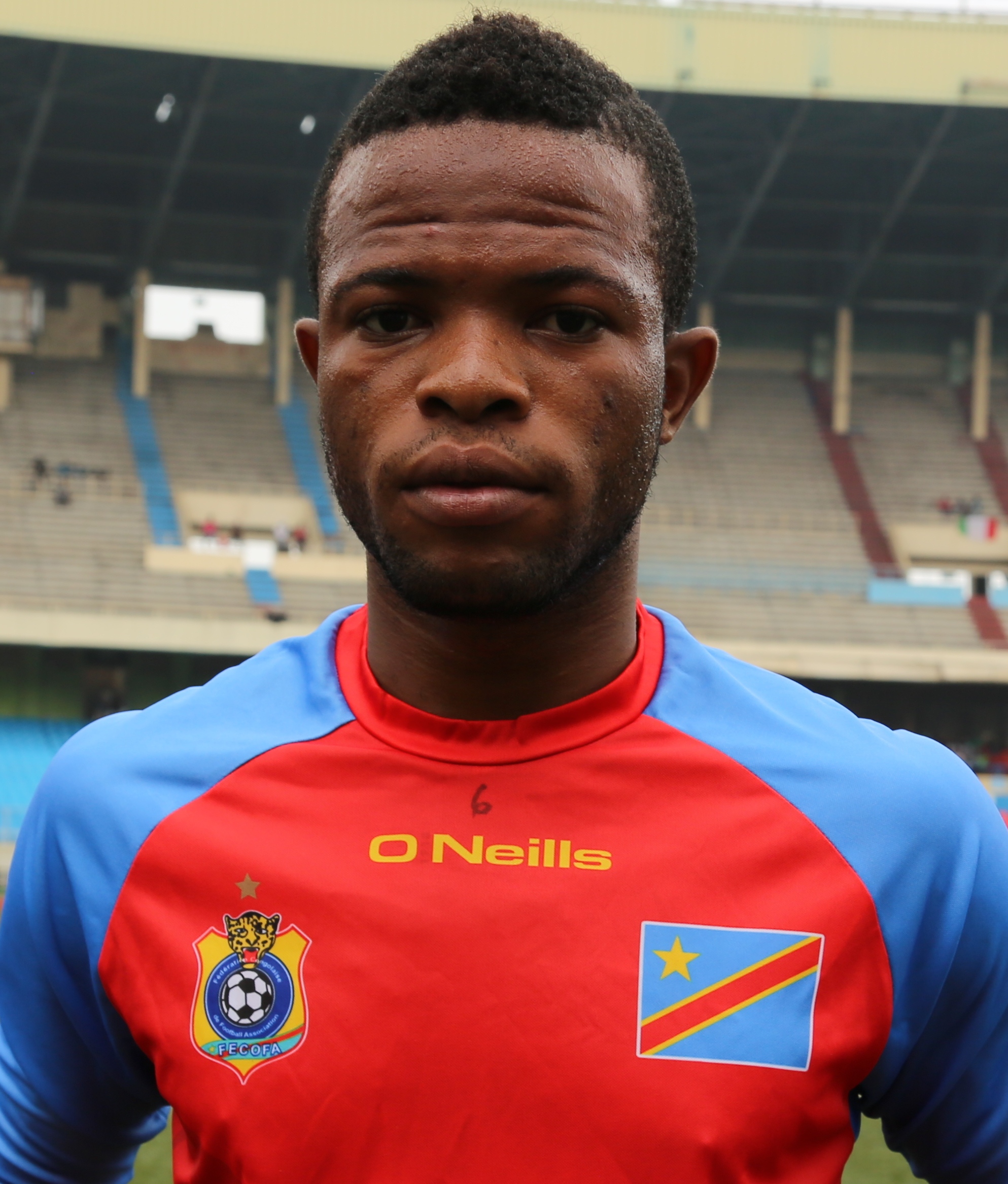
- Elia with DR Congo in 2016

Personal information
- Full name: Meschak Elia Lina
- Date of birth: 6 August 1997 (age 29)
- Place of birth: Kinshasa, DR Congo
- Height: 1.73 m (5 ft 8 in)
- Position: Forward

Team information
- Current team: Alanyaspor
- Number: 12

Senior career*
Years	Team	Apps	(Gls)
2015–2016	CS Don Bosco		
2016–2019	TP Mazembe	93	(21)
2020–2025	Young Boys	145	(32)
2025	→ Nantes (loan)	8	(1)
2025–	Alanyaspor	22	(3)

International career^{‡}
2016–	DR Congo	71	(12)
- * Club domestic league appearances and goals as of 10 June 2026 ‡ National team caps and goals as of 1 July 2026

Meschak Elia Lina (born 6 August 1997) is a Congolese professional footballer who plays as a forward for Süper Lig club Alanyaspor and the DR Congo national team. He received the best player award after him and his team's win in the 2016 African Nations Championship.

== Club career ==
In July 2019 it was announced that Elia would sign for Belgian First Division A club Anderlecht. He, however, disappeared and allegedly falsified his year of birth, which resulted in a 12-month ban by the Congolese Association Football Federation. In February 2020, FIFA "provisionally cleared" Elia to play again and he signed for Swiss Super League side BSC Young Boys.

On 3 February 2025, Elia joined Nantes in France on loan with an option to buy.

On 12 September 2025, he transferred to Turkey, joining Alanyaspor in the Süper Lig on a three-year deal. He thus departs Young Boys after making exactly 200 appearances for the club, scoring 43 goals and supplying 39 assists.

== International career ==
On 19 May 2026, Elia was included in the 26-man DR Congo national team squad selected by head coach Sébastien Desabre for the 2026 FIFA World Cup.

== Personal life ==
In December 2024 one of Elia's two sons died unexpectedly.

== Career statistics ==
=== Club ===
As of match played 16 May 2026

Appearances and goals by club, season and competition
Club	Season	League			National cup (Note: Includes Swiss Cup, Turkish Cup)		Continental		Other		Total	
Club	Season	Division	Apps	Goals	Apps	Goals	Apps	Goals	Apps	Goals	Apps	Goals
TP Mazembe	2015–16	Linafoot					3 (Note: Two appearances in CAF Champions League, one appearances in CAF Confederation Cup)	0	1 (Note: Appearances in CAF Super Cup)	0	4	0
TP Mazembe	2016–17	Linafoot					11 (Note: Two appearances in CAF Champions League, nine appearances and one goal in CAF Confederation Cup)	1	1	0	12	1
TP Mazembe	2017–18	Linafoot					10 (Note: Appearances in CAF Champions League)	3	1	0	11	3
TP Mazembe	2018–19	Linafoot					10	4	0	0	10	4
TP Mazembe	Total		93	21			34	8	3	0	130	29
Young Boys	2019–20	Swiss Super League	12	2	0	0	0	0	—		12	2
Young Boys	2020–21	Swiss Super League	25	6	1	0	11 (Note: Appearances in UEFA Europa League)	1	—		37	7
Young Boys	2021–22	Swiss Super League	30	8	1	0	12 (Note: Appearances in UEFA Champions League)	2	—		43	10
Young Boys	2022–23	Swiss Super League	31	7	5	3	5 (Note: Appearances in UEFA Europa Conference League)	2	—		41	12
Young Boys	2023–24	Swiss Super League	32	9	2	0	10 (Note: Eight appearances in UEFA Champions League, two appearances in UEFA Europa League)	2	—		44	11
Young Boys	2024–25	Swiss Super League	15	0	2	1	6 (Note: Six appearances in UEFA Champions League, two appearances in UEFA Europa League)	0	—		23	1
Young Boys	Total		145	32	11	4	46	7	—		200	43
Nantes (loan)	2024–25	Ligue 1	8	1	—		—		—		8	1
Alanyaspor	2025–26	Süper Lig	22	3	3	0	—		—		25	3
Career total			268	57	14	4	77	15	3	0	363	76

=== International ===
As of match played 1 July 2026

Appearances and goals by national team and year
National team	Year	Apps	Goals
DR Congo	2016	9	5
DR Congo	2017	2	0
DR Congo	2018	4	1
DR Congo	2019	7	0
DR Congo	2022	5	1
DR Congo	2023	9	0
DR Congo	2024	16	4
DR Congo	2025	13	1
DR Congo	2026	6	0
Total		71	12

Scores and results list DR Congo's goal tally first, score column indicates score after each Elia goal.

List of international goals scored by Meschak Elia
No.	Date	Venue	Opponent	Score	Result	Competition
1	17 January 2016	Stade Huye, Butare, Rwanda	Ethiopia	3–0	3–0	2016 African Nations Championship
2	21 January 2016	Stade Huye, Butare, Rwanda	Angola	2–0	3–0	2016 African Nations Championship
3	7 February 2016	Amahoro Stadium, Kigali, Rwanda	Mali	1–0	3–0	2016 African Nations Championship
4	7 February 2016	Amahoro Stadium, Kigali, Rwanda	Mali	2–0	3–0	2016 African Nations Championship
5	26 March 2016	Stade des Martyrs, Kinshasa, DR Congo	Angola	2–0	2–1	2017 Africa Cup of Nations qualification
6	9 September 2018	Samuel Kanyon Doe Sports Complex, Monrovia, Liberia	Liberia	1–1	1–1	2019 Africa Cup of Nations qualification
7	27 September 2022	Stade Père Jégo, Casablanca, Morocco	Sierra Leone	3–0	3–0	Friendly
8	28 January 2024	Laurent Pokou Stadium, San-Pédro, Ivory Coast	Egypt	1–0	1–1	2023 Africa Cup of Nations
9	9 June 2024	Stade des Martyrs, Kinshasa, DR Congo	Togo	1–0	1–0	2026 FIFA World Cup qualification
10	15 October 2024	Benjamin Mkapa Stadium, Dar es Salaam, Tanzania	Tanzania	1–0	2–0	2025 Africa Cup of Nations qualification
11	15 October 2024	Benjamin Mkapa Stadium, Dar es Salaam, Tanzania	Tanzania	2–0	2–0	2025 Africa Cup of Nations qualification
12	16 November 2025	Moulay Hassan Stadium, Rabat, Morocco	Nigeria	1–1	1–1 (a.e.t.)	2026 FIFA World Cup qualification

== Honours ==
TP Mazembe

- Linafoot: 2015–16, 2016-17
- CAF Confederation Cup: 2016, 2017
- CAF Super Cup: 2016

Young Boys

- Swiss Super League: 2019–20, 2020–21, 2023–24
- Swiss Cup: 2019–20, 2022–23

DR Congo

- African Nations Championship: 2016
