= Jaouen Hadjam =

Algeria international footballer (born 2003)

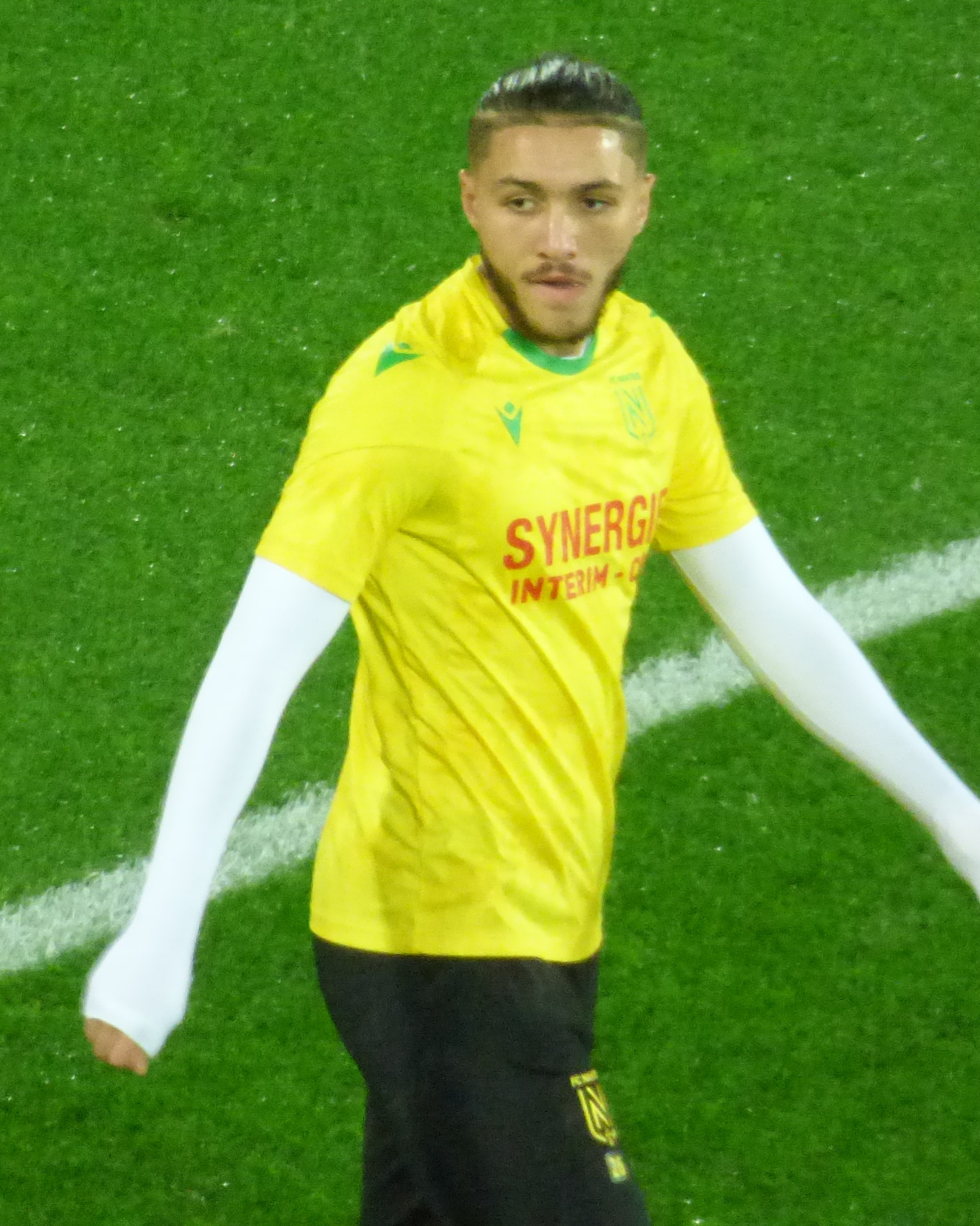
- Hadjam in 2023

Personal information
- Full name: Jaouen Djimmy Hadjam
- Date of birth: 26 March 2003 (age 23)
- Place of birth: Paris, France
- Height: 1.84 m (6 ft 0 in)
- Position: Left-back

Team information
- Current team: Brighton & Hove Albion
- Number: 3

Youth career
- 2009–2011: Champagne 95
- 2011–2014: Alfortville
- 2014–2015: Paris Saint-Germain
- 2015–2018: Creteil
- 2018–2020: Paris FC

Senior career*
Years	Team	Apps	(Gls)
2021–2022	Paris FC II	4	(0)
2020–2023	Paris FC	40	(0)
2023–2024	Nantes	21	(0)
2024–2026	Young Boys	73	(6)
2026–	Brighton & Hove Albion	3	(1)

International career^{‡}
2020	France U17	2	(0)
2022	France U19	2	(0)
2023–	Algeria	24	(4)
- * Club domestic league appearances and goals as of 31 October 2026 ‡ National team caps and goals as of 6 October 2026

Jaouen Djimmy Hadjam (Arabic: جوين حجام; born 26 March 2003) is a professional footballer who plays as a left-back for Premier League club Brighton & Hove Albion. Born in France, he represents the Algeria national team.

== Club career ==
=== Paris FC ===
On 18 January 2019, Hadjam signed his first professional contract with Paris FC. Hadjam made his professional debut with Paris FC in a 3–0 Ligue 2 win over Chambly on 22 August 2020.

=== Nantes ===
Having been approached for some time by the Italian club of Salernitana, on 17 January 2023, Hadjam joined Ligue 1 side Nantes for an undisclosed fee, signing a contract with the club until June 2027. On 22 January 2023, he made his debut with canaries in a penalties away win against Thaon in the Coupe de France. Seven days later, Hadjam made his debut in Ligue 1 from the first minute against Clermont Foot.

In April 2023, Hadjam was dropped from the Nantes squad after he refused to break his Ramadan fast. Nantes coach Antoine Kombouare later clarified that Hadjam had agreed to break the fast for away matches, and that he respected his decision.

=== Young Boys ===
On 19 January 2024, Hadjam signed a contract with Swiss Super League club Young Boys until June 2028, for a reported fee of €1.3 million.

=== Brighton & Hove Albion ===
On 25 August 2026, Hadjam joined Premier League club Brighton & Hove Albion. On 10 October 2026, Hadjam scored on his debut Premier League appearance, coming on as a substitute, in a 2–0 away win against Sunderland.

== International career ==
Hadjam was born in France and is Algerian by descent. He holds French and Algerian nationalities. He is a former youth international for France, having played up to the France U19s. However, he later decided to represent Algeria and debuted for the home country of his parents in 2023.

On 31 May 2026, Hadjam was named in Vladimir Petković's 26-man Algeria squad for the 2026 FIFA World Cup.

== Career statistics ==
=== Club ===
As of match played 5 November 2026

Appearances and goals by club, season and competition
Club	Season	League			National cup (Note: Includes Coupe de France, Swiss Cup)		League cup (Note: Includes EFL Cup)		Europe		Other		Total	
Club	Season	Division	Apps	Goals	Apps	Goals	Apps	Goals	Apps	Goals	Apps	Goals	Apps	Goals
Paris FC II	2021–22	CFA 3	3	0	—		—		—		—		3	0
Paris FC II	2022–23	CFA 3	1	0	—		—		—		—		1	0
Paris FC II	Total		4	0	—		—		—		—		4	0
Paris FC	2020–21	Ligue 2	6	0	1	0	—		—		0	0	7	0
Paris FC	2021–22	Ligue 2	23	0	1	0	—		—		0	0	24	0
Paris FC	2022–23	Ligue 2	11	0	2	0	—		—		—		13	0
Paris FC	Total		40	0	4	0	—		—		0	0	44	0
Nantes	2022–23	Ligue 1	13	0	2	0	—		0	0	—		15	0
Nantes	2023–24	Ligue 1	8	0	0	0	—		—		—		8	0
Nantes	Total		21	0	2	0	—		0	0	—		23	0
Young Boys	2023–24	Swiss Super League	15	2	1	0	—		2 (Note: Appearances in UEFA Europa League)	0	—		18	2
Young Boys	2024–25	Swiss Super League	35	2	4	0	—		8 (Note: Appearances in UEFA Champions League)	0	—		47	2
Young Boys	2025–26	Swiss Super League	20	2	2	0	—		8	0	—		30	2
Young Boys	2026–27	Swiss Super League	3	0	—		—		—		—		3	0
Young Boys	Total		73	6	6	0	—		18	0	—		97	6
Brighton & Hove Albion	2026–27	Premier League	3	1	0	0	2	0	2 (Note: Appearances in UEFA Conference League)	0	—		7	1
Career total			142	7	12	0	2	0	20	0	0	0	176	7

=== International ===
As of match played 25 September 2026

Appearances and goals by national team and year
National team	Year	Apps	Goals
Algeria	2023	2	0
Algeria	2024	5	0
Algeria	2025	9	3
Algeria	2026	8	1
Total		24	4

Scores and results list Algeria's goal tally first, score column indicates score after each Hadjam goal

List of international goals scored by Jaouen Hadjam
No.	Date	Venue	Opponent	Score	Result	Competition
1	25 March 2025	Nelson Mandela Bay Stadium, Gqeberha, South Africa	Mozambique	4–1	5–1	2026 FIFA World Cup qualification
2	5 June 2025	Nelson Mandela Bay Stadium, Gqeberha, South Africa	Rwanda	2–0	2–0	2026 FIFA World Cup qualification
3	13 November 2025	Prince Abdullah Al-Faisal Sports City Stadium, Jeddah, Saudi Arabia	Zimbabwe	3–0	3–1	Friendly
4	25 September 2026	Hocine Aït Ahmed Stadium, Tizi Ouzou, Algeria	Zambia	1–0	3–1	2027 Africa Cup of Nations qualification
