= Anel Husić =

Swiss footballer (born 2001)

Personal information
- Full name: Anel Karim Husić
- Date of birth: 1 March 2001 (age 25)
- Place of birth: Yverdon-les-Bains, Switzerland
- Height: 1.89 m (6 ft 2 in)
- Position: Centre-back

Team information
- Current team: Rijeka
- Number: 51

Youth career
- –2016: Yverdon-Sport
- 2016–2020: Lausanne-Sport

Senior career*
Years	Team	Apps	(Gls)
2019–2020	Lausanne-Sport II	7	(1)
2021–2024	Lausanne-Sport	69	(1)
2024–2025	Young Boys	16	(0)
2025	→ Gaziantep (loan)	12	(0)
2025–	Rijeka	19	(1)

International career^{‡}
2021–2022	Switzerland U21	8	(1)
- * Club domestic league appearances and goals as of 23 May 2026 ‡ National team caps and goals as of 24 September 2022

Anel Karim Husić (born 1 March 2001) is a Swiss professional footballer who plays as a centre-back for Croatian club Rijeka.

== Club career ==
Anel Husić started playing football at his local club Yverdon-Sport FC, up until U-15 level, joining Lausanne-Sport's U-16 team the following season, progressing through the ranks of the club.

On 15 February 2024, Husić signed a contract with Young Boys until the summer of 2027.

On 10 February 2025, he was loaned to Gaziantep in Turkey, with an option to buy.

== Personal life ==
Born in Switzerland, Husić is of Bosnian descent. He holds both Swiss and Bosnian citizenship.

== Career statistics ==
=== Club ===
As of match played 15 December 2024

Appearances and goals by club, season and competition
Club	Season	League			National cup (Note: Includes Swiss Cup)		League cup		Europe		Total	
Club	Season	Division	Apps	Goals	Apps	Goals	Apps	Goals	Apps	Goals	Apps	Goals
Lausanne Sport	2021–22	Swiss Super League	23	1	2	0	—		—		25	1
Lausanne Sport	2022–23	Swiss Challenge League	29	0	1	0	—		—		30	0
Lausanne Sport	2023–24	Swiss Super League	17	0	2	0	—		—		19	0
Lausanne Sport	Total		69	1	5	0	0	0	0	0	74	1
Young Boys	2023–24	Swiss Super League	7	0	1	0	—		0	0	8	0
Young Boys	2024–25	Swiss Super League	9	0	0	0	—		0	0	9	0
Young Boys	Total		16	0	1	0	—		0	0	17	0
Career total			85	1	6	0	0	0	0	0	91	1
