= Cedric Itten =

Swiss footballer (born 1996)

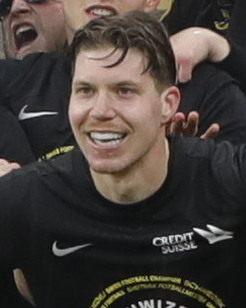
- Itten with Young Boys in 2024

Personal information
- Full name: Cedric Jan Itten
- Date of birth: 27 December 1996 (age 29)
- Place of birth: Basel, Switzerland
- Height: 1.89 m (6 ft 2 in)
- Position: Centre forward

Team information
- Current team: Werder Bremen
- Number: 26

Youth career
- 2003–2004: FC Black Stars Basel
- 2004–2007: BSC Old Boys
- 2007–2015: Basel

Senior career*
Years	Team	Apps	(Gls)
2013–2015	Basel U21	32	(1)
2015–2018	Basel	21	(3)
2016–2017	→ FC Luzern (loan)	33	(3)
2018	→ St. Gallen (loan)	16	(5)
2018–2020	St. Gallen	42	(23)
2020–2022	Rangers	33	(5)
2021–2022	→ Greuther Fürth (loan)	12	(2)
2022–2025	Young Boys	95	(37)
2025–2026	Fortuna Düsseldorf	30	(15)
2026–	Werder Bremen	5	(0)

International career^{‡}
2013–2014	Switzerland U18	6	(3)
2014–2015	Switzerland U19	6	(2)
2015–2016	Switzerland U20	8	(2)
2016–2018	Switzerland U21	7	(0)
2019–	Switzerland	19	(5)
- * Club domestic league appearances and goals as of 17:32, 24 October 2026 (UTC) ‡ National team caps and goals as of 22:45, 29 September 2026 (UTC)

Cedric Jan Itten (born 27 December 1996) is a Swiss professional footballer who plays as a centre forward for Bundesliga club Werder Bremen and the Switzerland national team.

== Club career ==
=== Youth football ===
Itten started his youth football with FC Black Stars Basel in 2003, before moving to BSC Old Boys a year later. In February 2007 he moved on to the youth department of Basel and played in their U-18 team and their U-21 team. Itten was a part of FC Basel's 2013–14 UEFA Youth League campaign.

=== Basel ===
Itten signed a three-year junior professional contract on 21 August 2015 and joined Basel's first team for their 2015–16 season under head coach Urs Fischer. After playing in two test games, Itten played his domestic league debut for the club in the home game in the St. Jakob-Park on 21 February 2016 as Basel won 5–1 against Vaduz. Itten played the assist as Birkir Bjarnason scored the last goal of the game. He scored his first league goal for his club on 13 February in the away game in the Cornaredo as Basel won 4–1 against Lugano. It was the team's fourth goal, scored just before half time. With the team Itten won the Swiss Super League championship at the end of the 2015–16 Super League season. For the club it was the seventh title in a row and their 19th championship title in total.

==== Luzern (loan) ====
On 18 June 2016, Basel announced that they were loaning out Itten to FC Luzern, until the end of the 2016–17 Swiss Super League season, so that he could gain more first team playing experience. Itten had a successful season scoring three goals in 28 appearances. Then, on 23 June 2017 Basel announced that they were prolonging their contract with Itten until 30 June 2020 and were continuing the loan Itten to Luzern for another period, until the end of the 2017–18 season.

==== Return to Basel ====
Due to Basel's bad start to their 2017–18 season, due strikers transferring out and due to injuries of their replacements, on 13 September 2017 Basel announced that they had recalled striker Itten back from his loan. His first goal following his return was the winning goal for the team in the Stadio Comunale (Chiasso) during the 2017–18 Swiss Cup match on 17 September. It was the winning goal as Basel won 1–0 against FC Chiasso. Until the winter break Itten had 10 domestic league appearances, scoring two goals.

In January 2018 Itten was loaned to St. Gallen, but never returned to Basel. During his period with the club, Itten played a total of 29 games for Basel scoring a total of five goals. 21 of these games were in the Swiss Super League, three in the Swiss Cup, two in the UEFA competitions (Champions League and Europa League) and three were friendly games. He scored three goals in the domestic league, one in the cup and the other was scored during the test games.

=== St. Gallen ===
On 17 January 2018, Basel announced that Itten would be loaned out to St. Gallen until the end of the season, with an option to buy. On 29 June 2018 it was announced that St. Gallen pulled the option and had bought the striker.

=== Rangers ===
On 4 August 2020, Itten signed for Scottish club Rangers, on a four-year deal and for an undisclosed fee, reported to be £2.7 million.

Cedric was part of the Rangers title winning squad that stopped nine consecutive years of failure in the SPL. They stopped their arch-rivals Celtic winning ten championships in a row.

During that season, Cedric was primarily used as a super-sub by Steven Gerrard, making a total of 5 starts and 20 substitute appearances in that league campaign.

On 9 August 2020, Itten made his debut for Rangers in a Scottish Premiership match against St Mirren.

On 27 September 2020, Itten scored his first two goals for Rangers, coming off the bench to score Rangers' fourth and fifth goals in a 5–1 win against Motherwell at Fir Park.

Cedric Itten was thus part of the Rangers chamionship winning squad of 2020-2021. A squad that was unbeaten in the league.

==== Greuther Fürth (loan) ====
On 31 August 2021, the last day of the 2021 summer transfer window Itten signed for German club Greuther Fürth on a season-long loan. On 12 January 2022, Itten's loan was cut short as he was recalled by parent club Rangers.

=== Young Boys ===
On 1 June 2022, his transfer to Bernese club BSC Young Boys was announced. He signed a four-year contract with the Swiss Super League club.

=== Fortuna Düsseldorf ===
On 28 July 2025, Itten signed with Fortuna Düsseldorf in German 2. Bundesliga.

=== Werder Bremen ===
On 21 June 2026, Itten signed with Werder Bremen in German Bundesliga.

== International career ==
On 15 November 2019, Itten made his debut in the Switzerland national team, coming as a substitute in a 1–0 win over Georgia and scoring the only goal of the match. Three days later, he scored twice in a 6–1 win over Gibraltar.

On 20 May 2026, Itten was selected in the 26-man squad for the 2026 FIFA World Cup.

== Career statistics ==
=== Club ===
As of match played 27 October 2026

Appearances and goals by club, season and competition
Club	Season	League			National cup (Note: Includes Swiss Cup, Scottish Cup, DFB-Pokal)		League cup (Note: Includes Scottish League Cup)		Europe		Total	
Club	Season	Division	Apps	Goals	Apps	Goals	Apps	Goals	Apps	Goals	Apps	Goals
Basel	2015–16	Swiss Super League	11	1	0	0	—		1 (Note: Appearance(s) in UEFA Europa League)	0	12	1
Basel	2017–18	Swiss Super League	10	2	3	1	—		6 (Note: Appearances in UEFA Champions League)	0	19	3
Basel	Total		21	3	3	1	—		7	0	31	4
Luzern (loan)	2016–17	Swiss Super League	28	3	2	0	—		1	0	31	3
Luzern (loan)	2017–18	Swiss Super League	5	0	—		—		2	0	7	0
Luzern (loan)	Total		33	3	2	0	—		3	0	38	3
St. Gallen (loan)	2017–18	Swiss Super League	16	5	—		—		—		16	5
St. Gallen	2018–19	Swiss Super League	8	4	1	2	—		1	0	10	6
St. Gallen	2019–20	Swiss Super League	34	19	1	0	—		—		35	19
St. Gallen	Total		44	23	2	2	—		1	0	45	25
Rangers	2020–21	Scottish Premiership	27	4	1	0	2	0	7	2	37	6
Rangers	2021–22	Scottish Premiership	6	1	2	1	0	0	3 (Note: One appearance in UEFA Champions League, two appearances in UEFA Europa League)	0	11	2
Rangers	Total		33	5	3	1	2	0	10	2	48	8
Greuther Fürth (loan)	2021–22	Bundesliga	12	2	0	0	—		—		12	2
Young Boys	2022–23	Swiss Super League	31	19	3	4	—		5 (Note: Appearances in UEFA Europa Conference League)	0	39	23
Young Boys	2023–24	Swiss Super League	30	10	3	1	0	0	8 (Note: Six appearances and two goals in UEFA Champions League, two appearances in UEFA Europa League)	2	41	13
Young Boys	2024–25	Swiss Super League	34	8	5	4	—		9	0	48	12
Young Boys	Total		95	37	11	9	0	0	22	2	128	48
Fortuna Düsseldorf	2025–26	2. Bundesliga	30	15	2	1	—		—		32	16
Werder Bremen	2026–27	Bundesliga	5	0	2	0	—		—		7	0
Career total			287	93	25	14	2	0	43	4	357	111

=== International ===
As of match played 29 September 2026

Appearances and goals by national team and year
National team	Year	Apps	Goals
Switzerland	2019	2	3
Switzerland	2020	2	0
Switzerland	2021	3	1
Switzerland	2022	0	0
Switzerland	2023	5	1
Switzerland	2024	0	0
Switzerland	2025	1	0
Switzerland	2026	6	0
Total		19	5

Scores and results list Switzerland's goal tally first, score column indicates score after each Itten goal.

List of international goals scored by Cedric Itten
No.	Date	Venue	Opponent	Score	Result	Competition
1	15 November 2019	Kybunpark, St. Gallen, Switzerland	Georgia	1–0	1–0	UEFA Euro 2020 qualification
2	18 November 2019	Victoria Stadium, Gibraltar	Gibraltar	1–0	6–1	UEFA Euro 2020 qualification
3	18 November 2019	Victoria Stadium, Gibraltar	Gibraltar	5–1	6–1	UEFA Euro 2020 qualification
4	15 November 2021	Swissporarena, Lucerne, Switzerland	Bulgaria	3–0	4–0	2022 FIFA World Cup qualification
5	12 September 2023	Tourbillon, Sion, Switzerland	Andorra	1–0	3–0	UEFA Euro 2024 qualification

== Honours ==
FC Basel

- Swiss Super League: 2015–16

Rangers

- Scottish Premiership: 2020–21
- Scottish Cup: 2021–22

Young Boys

- Swiss Super League: 2022–23, 2023–24
- Swiss Cup: 2022–23

Individual

- Swiss Super League Best player of the round: 2022–23 (Round 10),
- Swiss Super League Player of the Month: March 2023
- Swiss Super League Team of the Year: 2019–20, 2022–23
