= 2024–25 BSC Young Boys season =

BSC Young Boys
2024–25 season
- Chairman: Hanspeter Kienberger
- Manager: Patrick Rahmen (until 8 October); Giorgio Contini (from 18 December)
- Stadium: Stadion Wankdorf
- Swiss Super League: 3rd
- Swiss Cup: Semi-finals
- UEFA Champions League: League phase
- Top goalscorer: League: Christian Fassnacht (11 goals); All: Christian Fassnacht (11 goals)
- Highest home attendance: 31,500 vs Galatasaray
- Lowest home attendance: 24,488 vs Yverdon-Sport FC
- Average home league attendance: 28,136
- Biggest win: FC Printse-Nendaz0–10 Young Boys
- Biggest defeat: Barcelona 5–0 Young Boys
Home colours	Away colours
- All statistics correct as of 19 May 2025.

The 2024–25 season was the 127th season in the history of BSC Young Boys, and the club's 24th consecutive season in the Swiss Super League. In addition to the domestic league, the team participated in the Swiss Cup and the UEFA Champions League.

== Squad ==
Position	Number	Player	Date joined	Further data
GK	26	(Switzerland) David von Ballmoos	2007	
GK	33	(Switzerland) Marvin Keller	2023	
DF	27	(Switzerland) Lewin Blum	2012	
DF	30	(Switzerland) Sandro Lauper	2018	
DF	5	(Switzerland) Anel Husić	2024	
DF	3	(Algeria) Jaouen Hadjam	2024	
DF	4	(France) Tanguy Zoukrou	2024	
DF	24	(Switzerland) Zachary Athekame	2024	
MF	77	(Switzerland) Joël Monteiro	2021	
MF	7	(Switzerland) Filip Ugrinić	2022	
MF	14	(Zambia) Miguel Chaiwa	2022	
MF	10	(Switzerland) Kastriot Imeri	2022	
MF	8	(Poland) Łukasz Łakomy	2023	
MF	19	(Sweden) Noah Persson	2022	
MF	11	(The Gambia) Ebrima Colley	2024	
FW	15	(Democratic Republic of the Congo) Meschak Elia	2020	
FW	35	(Republic of the Congo) Silvère Ganvoula	2023	
FW	9	(Switzerland) Cedric Itten	2022	
FW	39	(Switzerland) Darian Maleš	2023	

== Transfers ==
=== In ===
Pos.	Player	Transferred from	Fee	Date	Source
MF	(Switzerland) Alexandre Jankewitz	(Switzerland) Winterthur	Loan return	30 June 2024	
GK	(Switzerland) Marvin Keller	(Switzerland) Winterthur	Loan return	30 June 2024	
DF	(Zambia) Miguel Chaiwa	(Switzerland) Schaffhausen	Loan return	30 June 2024	
MF	(Kosovo) Donat Rrudhani	(Switzerland) Lausanne-Sport	Loan return	30 June 2024	
DF	(Switzerland) Zachary Athekame	(Switzerland) Neuchâtel Xamax	Loan return	30 June 2024	
DF	(Switzerland) Joel Bichsel	(Germany) SC Freiburg II	Loan return	30 June 2024	
MF	(Switzerland) Théo Golliard	(Liechtenstein) Vaduz	Loan return	30 June 2024	
DF	(France) Tanguy Zoukrou	(France) Toyes	Undisclosed	1 July 2024	
FW	(Guinea) Facinet Conte	(France) Bastia	Free	1 July 2024	
FW	(The Gambia) Ebrima Colley	(Italy) Atalanta	Undisclosed	1 July 2024	
MF	(France) Alan Virginius	(France) Lille	Loan	3 August 2024	
MF	(Switzerland) Christian Fassnacht	(England) Norwich City	Undisclosed	15 January 2025	

=== Out ===
Pos.	Player	Transferred to	Fee	Date	Source
MF	(Kosovo) Donat Rrudhani	(Switzerland) Luzern	Loan	30 July 2024	
DF	(Switzerland) Sadin Crnovrsanin	(Switzerland) Wil	Loan	7 January 2025	

== Friendlies ==
=== Pre-season ===
28 June 2024 Friendly	Young Boys (Switzerland)	0–2	(Switzerland) Thun
17:30

28 June 2024 Friendly	FC Breitenrain (Switzerland)	1–2	(Switzerland) Young Boys
19:30

2 July 2024 Friendly	Young Boys (Switzerland)	4–0	(Switzerland) Neuchâtel Xamax	Gstaad
16:00				Stadium: Sportplatz Schützebode

6 July 2024 Friendly	Young Boys (Switzerland)	0–1	(Belgium) Westerlo	Payerne
15:00				Stadium: Stade Municipal

10 July 2024 Friendly	Young Boys (Switzerland)	2–2	(Ukraine) Kryvbas Kryvyi Rih	Solothurn
18:00	Lauper 9'; Hadjam 25'		Vakulko 6'; Kozhushko 73'	Stadium: Stadion FC Solothurn

13 July 2024 Friendly	Young Boys (Switzerland)	1–0	(Switzerland) Aarau	Bern
15:00	29' (pen.)			Stadium: Stadion Wankdorf

13 July 2024 Friendly	Young Boys (Switzerland)	1–3	(Switzerland) Wil	Bern
18:00				Stadium: Stadion Wankdorf

== Competitions ==
=== Overall record ===
Competition	First match	Last match	Starting round	Record							
Competition	First match	Last match	Starting round	Pld	W	D	L	GF	GA	GD	Win %
Swiss Super League	21 July 2024	22–24 May 2025	Matchday 1	8	1	3	4	11	16	−5	12.50
Swiss Cup	16–18 August 2024			2	2	0	0	14	2	+12	100.00
UEFA Champions League	20–21 August 2024		Play-off round	3	2	0	1	4	5	−1	66.67
Total				13	5	3	5	29	23	+6	38.46

Last updated: 28 September 2024
Source: Soccerway

=== Swiss Super League ===
==== League table ====
Pos	Team	Pld	W	D	L	GF	GA	GD	Pts	Qualification or relegation (Note: Teams play each other three times (33 matches), before the league is split into two groups (the top six and the bottom six).)
1	Basel (C)	38	22	7	9	91	43	+48	73	Qualification for the Champions League play-off round
2	Servette	38	17	12	9	64	55	+9	63	Qualification for the Champions League second qualifying round
3	Young Boys	38	17	10	11	60	49	+11	61	Qualification for the Europa League play-off round (Note: The 2024–25 Swiss Cup winner (Basel) qualifies for the Europa League play-off round. Since the cup winner finished in the top three, the remaining European berths were passed down to the next highest qualifying teams.)
4	Lugano	38	15	9	14	55	58	−3	54	Qualification for the Europa League second qualifying round
5	Lausanne-Sport	38	14	11	13	62	54	+8	53	Qualification for the Conference League second qualifying round

Source: Swiss Super League
Rules for classification: 1) Points; 2) Goal difference; 3) Goals scored; 4) Head-to-head goal difference; 5) Head-to-head goals scored 6) Away goals scored; 7) Draw.
(C) Champions

==== Results summary ====
Overall								Home						Away					
Pld	W	D	L	GF	GA	GD	Pts	W	D	L	GF	GA	GD	W	D	L	GF	GA	GD
18	6	5	7	25	29	−4	23	5	2	2	16	12	+4	1	3	5	9	17	−8

Last updated: 15 December 2024.

==== Results by round ====
Round	1	2	3	4	5	6	7	8	9	10	11	12	13	14	15	16	17	18
Ground	H	A	H	A	A	H	A	H	A	H	A	H	A	H	A	H	A	H
Result	L	L	D	D	L	D	W	L	L	W	L	W	D	W	D	W	L	W
Position	8	12	12	11	12	12	9	11	12	10	10	10	10	9	9	9	9	9

Updated to match(es) played on 15 December 2024. Source:
A = Away; H = Home; W = Win; D = Draw; L = Loss

==== Matches ====
The match schedule was released on 18 June 2024.

21 July 2024 1	Young Boys	1–2	Sion	Bern
14:15	Ganvoula 16'; Hadjam (yellow card) 23' (yellow-red card) 59'; Husić (yellow card) 32'; Ugrinic (yellow card) 90+2'		Lavanchy (yellow card) 31'; Bouchlarhem (yellow card) 34'; Djokic 39'; Chouaref 66'; Fayulu (yellow card) 90+4'; Sorgić (yellow card) 90+6'	Stadium: Stadion Wankdorf; Attendance: 28,366; Referee: Alessandro Dudic

24 July 2024 5	Servette	3–1	Young Boys	Lancy
20:30	Tsunemoto 32', (yellow card) 87'; Stevanović 40'; Mazikou (yellow card) 73'; Crivelli 79' (pen.)		Chaiwa (yellow card) 45+2'; Itten 71'; Zoukrou (yellow card) 75'; Blum (yellow card) 89'	Stadium: Stade de Genève; Attendance: 8,727; Referee: Fedayi San

28 July 2024 2	St. Gallen	4–0	Young Boys	St. Gallen
16:30	Chadrac Akolo 9'; Geubbels 18'; Mambimbi 51'; Witzig 55'		Maleš (yellow card) 81'	Stadium: Kybunpark; Attendance: 18,720; Referee: Urs Schnyder

4 August 2024 3	Young Boys	2–2	Zürich	Bern
16:30	Brecher 18' (o.g.); Gómez (yellow card) 34'; Ganvoula 54'; Itten (yellow card) 90+6'		Marchesano 7' (pen.); Gómez (yellow card) 34'; Katić (yellow card) 47'; Okita (yellow card) 51'; Katić 76'; Wallner (yellow card) 86'; Kryeziu (red card) 90+1'	Stadium: Stadion Wankdorf; Attendance: 30,630; Referee: Lukas Fähndrich

10 August 2024 4	Yverdon-Sport	2–2	Young Boys	Yverdon-les-Bains
20:30	Kevin Carlos 5'; Kacuri (yellow card) 64'; Aké 78'; Céspedes (yellow card) 90+2'		Ganvoula 9'; Céspedes 49' (o.g.); Camara (red card) 62'; Lauper (yellow card) 86'	Stadium: Stade Municipal; Attendance: 3,200; Referee: Urs Schnyder

31 August 2024 6	Young Boys	1–1	Lausanne-Sport	Bern
20:30				Stadium: Stadion Wankdorf

22 September 2024 7	Winterthur	1–4	Young Boys	Winterthur
16:30				Stadium: Stadion Schützenwiese

28 September 2024 8	Young Boys	0–1	Grasshopper	Stadion Wankdorf, Bern
20:30 CEST (UTC+2)		Report	4' (Lee) Morandi; (yellow card) 8' Abrashi; (yellow card) 10' Kittel; (yellow card) 72' Lee	Attendance: 26,203; Referee: Urs Schnyder; Assistant referees: Fedayi San (VAR); Man of the Match: Giotto Morandi

6 October 2024 9	Basel	1–0	Young Boys	Basel
16:30				Stadium: St. Jakob Park

19 October 2024 10	Young Boys	2–1	Luzern	Bern
18:00 CET	Benito (yellow card) 18'; Niasse (yellow card) 42'; Camara (yellow card) 44'; Ugrinić (yellow card) 45+4'; Monteiro 47'; Itten 50'; Elia (yellow card) 85'; von Ballmoos (yellow card) 90+3'	Report	Dorn (yellow card) 26'; Knezevic (yellow card) 45+2'; Jaquez (yellow card) 45+4' (goal) 70'; Stanković (yellow card) 90+3'	Stadium: Stadion Wankdorf; Attendance: 31,500; Referee: (Switzerland) Luca Piccolo

27 October 2024 11	Lugano	2–0	Young Boys	Lugano
16:30 CET	Aliseda 18'; Grgić (yellow card) 24'; Mahmoud 33'; Brault-Guillard (yellow card) 71'; Mai (yellow card) 85'	Report	Husić (yellow card) 36'; Athekame (yellow card) 81'; Łakomy (yellow card) 85'	Stadium: Stadio di Cornaredo; Attendance: 3,248; Referee: (Switzerland) Lionel Tschudi

30 October 2024 12	Young Boys	3–2	Basel	Bern
20:30 CET	Blum (yellow card) 25'; Ugrinić 64'; Virginius (yellow card) 69'; Dräger 81' (o.g.); Barišić 87' (o.g.)	Report	Kade 19' (yellow card) 35'; Vouilloz (yellow card) 26'; Shaqiri (yellow card) 67'; Mendes (yellow card) 70'; Leroy (yellow card) 81'; Schmid 89'	Stadium: Stadion Wankdorf; Attendance: 30,024; Referee: (Switzerland) Fedayi San

2 November 2024 13	Zürich	0–0	Young Boys	Zürich
18:00 CET	Rodrigo Conceição (yellow card) 55'	Report	Imeri (yellow card) 73'; Ugrinić (yellow card) 79'; Monteiro (red card) 79'; Colley (yellow card) 86'	Stadium: Stadion Letzigrund; Attendance: 16,014; Referee: (Switzerland) Urs Schnyder

10 November 2024 14	Young Boys	2–1	Lugano	Bern
16:30 CET	Itten 19' (pen.); Elia (yellow card) 46'; Łakomy (yellow card) 65'; Hadjam (yellow card) 67'; Virginius 76'	Report	Bottani (yellow card) 19'; Valenzuela (yellow card) 24'; Grgić 33' (pen.); Bislimi (yellow card) 54'; Mahmoud (yellow card) 67' (yellow-red card) 87'; Zanotti (yellow card) 86'; Papadopoulos (yellow card) 90+6'	Stadium: Stadion Wankdorf; Attendance: 27,972; Referee: (Switzerland) Stefan Horisberger

23 November 2024 15	Luzern	1–1	Young Boys	Lucerne
18:00 CET	Owusu (yellow card) 39'; Klidjé 79'; Rrudhani (yellow card) 90+7'	Report	Ugrinić (yellow card) 30'; Maleš 34'; Łakomy (yellow card) 58'; Athekame (yellow card) 72'; Itten (yellow card) 84'	Stadium: Swissporarena; Attendance: 12,416; Referee: (Switzerland) Luca Cibelli

1 December 2024 16	Young Boys	3–1	St. Gallen	Bern
16:30 CET	Maleš 23'; Itten 26' (yellow card) 84'; Imeri (yellow card) 89'; Ganvoula 90+6'	Report	Görtler (yellow card) 16'; Cissé 53'; Noah Yannick (red card) 64'; Witzig (yellow card) 69'	Stadium: Stadion Wankdorf; Attendance: 29,124; Referee: (Switzerland) Luca Cibelli

7 December 2024 17	Sion	3–1	Young Boys	Sion
18:00 CET	Diouf 14'; Schmied 16'; Chouaref 29'; Mouhcine Bouriga (yellow card) 73'; Ziegler (yellow card) 82'; Marquinhos Cipriano (yellow card) 90+1'	Report	Hadjam (yellow card) 11'; Blum (yellow card) 23'; Niasse (yellow card) 42' (yellow-red card) 66'; Monteiro 90+4'	Stadium: Stade de Tourbillon; Attendance: 10,300; Referee: (Switzerland) Fedayi San

15 December 2024 18	Young Boys	2–1	Servette	Bern
14:15 CET	Maleš 37' 46' (yellow card) 82'; Athekame (yellow card) 68'	Report	Kutesa 6'	Stadium: Stadion Wankdorf; Attendance: 29,215; Referee: (Switzerland) Luca Cibelli

=== Swiss Cup ===
17 August 2024 First round	FC Printse-Nendaz	0–10	Young Boys	Nendaz
17:00		Report	Maleš 1', 25'; Itten 29', 31', 53'; Virginius 38', 45+1', 55'; Golliard 63'; Quartier 90' (o.g.)	Stadium: Stade des Grangettes

14 September 2024 Second round	Vevey-Sports	2–4	Young Boys
18:00

4 December 2024 Round of 16	Schaffhausen	0–1	Young Boys	Schaffhausen
20:00 CET	Bunjaku (yellow card) 65'; Ben Schläppi (yellow card) 67' (yellow-red card) 81'; Gianni De Nitti (yellow card) 79'; Marc Giger (red card) 79'	Report	Lauper 35'; Hadjam (yellow card) 38'; Niasse (yellow card) 66'; Camara (red card) 67'; Ganvoula (yellow card) 87'	Stadium: FCS Arena Schaffhausen; Attendance: 4,539; Referee: (Switzerland) Stefan Horisberger

27 February 2025 Quarter-finals	Zürich	–	Young Boys	Zurich
20:30 CET				Stadium: Letzigrund

=== UEFA Champions League ===
==== Play-off round ====
21 August 2024 First leg	Young Boys (Switzerland)	3–2	(Turkey) Galatasaray	Bern
21:00 UTC+2	Monteiro 3', 45+4'; Hadjam (yellow card) 26'; Lauper (yellow card) 29'; Niasse (yellow card) 43'; Mohamed Ali Camara (yellow card) 70'; Ugrinic 86' (pen.)		Bardakcı (yellow card) 22' (yellow-red card) 84'; Torreira (yellow card) 45+6'; Batshuayi 66', 72'	Stadium: Wankdorf Stadium; Attendance: 31,500; Referee: Daniel Siebert (Germany)

27 August 2024 Second leg	Galatasaray (Turkey)	0–1 (2–4 agg.)	(Switzerland) Young Boys	Istanbul, Turkey
22:00 UTC+3			Virginius 87'	Stadium: Rams Park

==== League phase ====
Pos	Team	Pld	W	D	L	GF	GA	GD	Pts
32	(German Football Association) RB Leipzig	8	1	0	7	8	15	−7	3
33	(Royal Spanish Football Federation) Girona	8	1	0	7	5	13	−8	3
34	(Austrian Football Association) Red Bull Salzburg	8	1	0	7	5	27	−22	3
35	(Slovak Football Association) Slovan Bratislava	8	0	0	8	7	27	−20	0
36	(Swiss Football Association) Young Boys	8	0	0	8	3	24	−21	0

Source: UEFA
Rules for classification: League phase tiebreakers

Round	1	2	3	4	5	6	7	8
Ground	H	A	H	A	H	A	A	H
Result	L	L	L	L	L	L	L	L
Position	31	36	36	36	36	36	36	36

Updated to match(es) played on 11 December 2024. Source: UEFA
A = Away; H = Home; W = Win; D = Draw; L = Loss

17 September 2024 1	Young Boys (Switzerland)	0–3	(England) Aston Villa	Bern, Switzerland
18:45 CET	Niasse (yellow card) 33'; Lauper (yellow card) 46'; Elia (yellow card) 53'; Monteiro (yellow card) 78'	Report	Tielemans 27'; Ramsey 38'; Durán (yellow card) 79'; Onana 86'	Stadium: Wankdorf Stadium; Referee: Georgi Kabakov (Bulgaria)

1 October 2024 2	Barcelona (Spain)	5–0	(Switzerland) Young Boys	Barcelona, Spain
21:00	Lewandowski 8', 51'; Raphinha 34'; Martínez 37'; Camara 81' (o.g.)

23 October 2024 3	Young Boys (Switzerland)	0–1	(Italy) Inter Milan	Bern
21:00	Hadjam (yellow card) 33'; Monteiro (yellow card) 35'; Imeri (yellow card) 36'; Maleš (yellow card) 81'	Report	Dumfries (yellow card) 35'; Thuram 90+3'	Stadium: Wankdorf Stadium; Attendance: 31,500; Referee: (England) Michael Oliver

6 November 2024 4	Shakhtar Donetsk (Ukraine)	2–1	(Switzerland) Young Boys	Gelsenkirchen
18:45	Zubkov 31'; Sudakov 41'; Konoplya (yellow card) 81'	Report	Imeri 27'; Blum (yellow card) 40'; Athekame (yellow card) 45+3'; Niasse (yellow card) 70'	Stadium: Arena AufSchalke; Attendance: 17,420; Referee: (Israel) Orel Grinfeld

26 November 2024 5	Young Boys (Switzerland)	1–6	(Italy) Atalanta	Bern
21:00	Ganvoula 11'; Colley (yellow card) 44'; Elia (yellow card) 73'	Report	Retegui 9' 39'; De Ketelaere 28' 56'; Kolašinac 31'; Brescianini (yellow card) 45'; Samardžić 90'	Stadium: Wankdorf Stadium; Attendance: 31,500; Referee: (Lithuania) Manfredas Lukjančukas

11 December 2024 6	VfB Stuttgart (Germany)	5–1	(Switzerland) Young Boys	Stuttgart, Germany
21:00	Stiller 25'; Millot 53'; Führich 61'; Vagnoman 66'; Keitel 75'; Rieder (yellow card) 86'	Report	Łakomy 6' (yellow card) 90'; Benito (yellow card) 58'; Hadjam (yellow card) 60'; Ugrinić (yellow card) 89'	Stadium: MHPArena; Attendance: 60,000; Referee: (Georgia (country)) Giorgi Kruashvili

22 January 2025 7	Celtic (Scotland)	1–0	(Switzerland) Young Boys	Glasgow
20:00 GMT	Benito 86' (o.g.)	Report		Stadium: Celtic Park; Attendance: 56,544; Referee: Rohit Saggi (Norway)

29 January 2025 8	Young Boys (Switzerland)	0–1	(Serbia) Red Star Belgrade	Bern
21:00		Report	Kanga 69'	Stadium: Wankdorf Stadium; Attendance: 31,500; Referee: (Turkey) Umut Meler
