= David von Ballmoos =

Swiss footballer (born 1994)

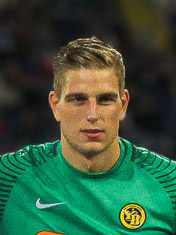
- Von Ballmoos with Young Boys in 2017

Personal information
- Date of birth: 30 December 1994 (age 31)
- Place of birth: Heimiswil, Switzerland
- Height: 1.92 m (6 ft 4 in)
- Position: Goalkeeper

Team information
- Current team: FC Lugano
- Number: 16

Youth career
- 2007–2015: Young Boys

Senior career*
Years	Team	Apps	(Gls)
2015–2026	Young Boys	191	(0)
2015–2017	→ Winterthur (loan)	63	(0)
2025–2026	→ Lugano (loan)	15	(0)
2026–	Lugano	8	(0)

International career^{‡}
2014	Switzerland U20	2	(0)
- * Club domestic league appearances and goals as of 28 September 2026 ‡ National team caps and goals as of 19:48, 4 June 2023 (UTC)

David von Ballmoos (born 30 December 1994) is a Swiss professional footballer who plays as a goalkeeper for Swiss Super League club FC Lugano.

== Club career ==
Von Ballmoss has been part of the Young Boys team since he joined in 2007 as part of their youth team. He was promoted into the main team in 2015 and sent on loan to FC Winterthur in Swiss Challenge League for the 2015–16 and 2016–17 seasons. He has been back at BSC Young Boys since the 2017–18 season and now plays as the main goalkeeper in the Super League. Von Balmoos made his professional debut for Young Boys in a Swiss Super League 2–0 win over Basel on 22 July 2017.

On 8 September 2025, he joined league rivals FC Lugano on loan for the 2025–26 season, with an option for a permanent transfer.

On 1 April 2026, it was announced that he will sign with FC Lugano on a permanent contract from the summer. He signed a three-year contract.

== International career ==
Von Ballmoos is a two-time international for the Switzerland U20s.

He was called up to the senior Switzerland squad in November 2020.

== Career statistics ==
=== Club ===
As of 26 April 2025

Appearances and goals by club, season and competition
Club	Season	League			Cup		Continental		Other		Total	
Club	Season	Division	Apps	Goals	Apps	Goals	Apps	Goals	Apps	Goals	Apps	Goals
Winterthur (loan)	2015–16	Swiss Challenge League	31	0	0	0	—		—		31	0
Winterthur (loan)	2016–17	Swiss Challenge League	32	0	0	0	—		—		32	0
Winterthur (loan)	Total		63	0	0	0	—		—		63	0
Young Boys	2017–18	Swiss Super League	17	0	4	0	8 (Note: Three appearances in UEFA Champions League, five appearances in UEFA Europa League)	0	—		29	0
Young Boys	2018–19	Swiss Super League	34	0	1	0	6 (Note: Appearances in UEFA Champions League)	0	—		41	0
Young Boys	2019–20	Swiss Super League	34	0	5	0	8 (Note: Two appearances in UEFA Champions League, six appearances in UEFA Europa League)	0	—		47	0
Young Boys	2020–21	Swiss Super League	31	0	1	0	11 (Note: Two appearances in UEFA Champions League, nine appearances in UEFA Europa League)	0	—		43	0
Young Boys	2021–22	Swiss Super League	21	0	2	0	7	0	—		30	0
Young Boys	2022–23	Swiss Super League	15	0	1	0	5 (Note: Appearances in UEFA Europa Conference League)	0	—		21	0
Young Boys	2023–24	Swiss Super League	22	0	2	0	3 (Note: One appearance in UEFA Champions League, two appearances in UEFA Europa League)	0	—		27	0
Young Boys	2024–25	Swiss Super League	17	0	3	0	5	0	—		25	0
Young Boys	Total		191	0	19	0	53	0	—		263	0
Career total			254	0	19	0	53	0	0	0	326	0

== Honours ==
Young Boys

- Swiss Super League: 2017–18, 2018–19, 2019–20, 2020–21, 2022–23
- Swiss Cup: 2019–20, 2022–23

Individual

- Swiss Super League Most clean sheets: 2020–21,
- Swiss Super League Team of the Year: 2020–21
