= Filip Ugrinić =

Swiss footballer (born 1999)

Personal information
- Date of birth: 5 January 1999 (age 27)
- Place of birth: Lucerne, Switzerland
- Height: 1.84 m (6 ft 0 in)
- Position: Central midfielder

Team information
- Current team: Valencia
- Number: 23

Youth career
- 2006–2010: FC Kickers Luzern
- 2006–2016: Luzern

Senior career*
Years	Team	Apps	(Gls)
2016–2022	Luzern	121	(20)
2019–2020	→ Emmen (loan)	13	(0)
2022–2025	Young Boys	91	(8)
2025–	Valencia	27	(0)

International career
2017	Switzerland U18	2	(0)
2017–2018	Switzerland U19	6	(2)
2018	Switzerland U20	3	(0)
2019	Switzerland U21	1	(0)
2023–2024	Switzerland	4	(0)
- * Club domestic league appearances and goals as of 27 May 2026

Filip Ugrinić (Serbian Cyrillic: Филип Угринић; born 5 January 1999) is a Swiss professional footballer who plays as a central midfielder for La Liga club Valencia.

== Club career ==
=== FC Luzern ===
Born in Lucerne, Switzerland, Ugrinić began playing football for local club FC Kickers Luzern before moving to the Luzern in 2006.

At the start of the 2016–17 season, he made the leap into the FC Luzern first team competing in Swiss Super League, where he made his professional debut on 15 October 2016 in the away game against Basel. On 26 November in the 2–1 away victory against Thun, Ugrinić was in the starting line-up for the first time and played the entire match. He also recorded his first assist in the Super League in this game, directing a free-kick to Tomislav Puljić who made it 1–0. On 3 December 2016, he signed his first professional contract with Luzern until 2020. His youth contract ran until 2017.

On 13 July 2017, Ugrinić made his European debut in the second qualifying round of the UEFA Europa League, a 2–0 loss to Osijek. He scored his first professional goal on 26 October 2017 in a 3–2 away win in the Swiss Cup, knocking out Echallens.

Ugrinić scored his first league goal on 30 September 2018; his was the solitary goal in a 3–1 home defeat against Sion.

On 3 July 2019, his contract with Luzern was extended until 2021 and he was sent on a season-long loan to Eredivisie club Emmen. After his return to Luzern, he won the Swiss Cup with the team in May 2021.

=== BSC Young Boys ===
On 31 May 2022, Young Boys announced that they had reached an agreement with Luzern for the transfer of Ugrinić. He signed a four-year contract and was set to join the club on 1 July.

=== Valencia ===
On 8 August 2025, Ugrinić signed a four-year deal with La Liga side Valencia.

== International career ==
Ugrinić is a youth international for Switzerland at the U18 and U19 levels. In October 2019, he was capped at U21 level.

== Personal life ==
Born in Switzerland, Ugrinić is of Serbian descent.

== Career statistics ==
=== Club ===
As of match played 2 August 2025

Appearances and goals by club, season and competition
Club	Season	League			National cup		Continental		Other		Total	
Club	Season	Division	Apps	Goals	Apps	Goals	Apps	Goals	Apps	Goals	Apps	Goals
Luzern	2016–17	Swiss Super League	21	0	1	0	—		—		22	0
Luzern	2017–18	Swiss Super League	17	0	2	1	1 (Note: Appearances in UEFA Europa League)	0	—		20	1
Luzern	2018–19	Swiss Super League	14	1	2	0	1	0	—		17	1
Luzern	2020–21	Swiss Super League	33	5	2	0	—		—		35	5
Luzern	2021–22	Swiss Super League	34	9	5	1	2 (Note: Appearances in UEFA Europa Conference League)	0	—		41	10
Luzern	Total		119	15	12	2	4	0	—		135	17
Young Boys	2022–23	Swiss Super League	29	1	5	2	3	0	—		37	3
Young Boys	2023–24	Swiss Super League	24	4	1	0	9 (Note: Eight appearances and two goals in UEFA Champions League, one appearance and one goal in UEFA Europa League)	3	—		34	7
Young Boys	2024–25	Swiss Super League	36	3	4	1	9 (Note: Appearances in UEFA Champions League)	1	—		49	5
Young Boys	2025-26	Swiss Super League	2	0	0	0	0	0	—		2	0
Young Boys	Total		91	8	10	3	21	4	—		123	15
Emmen (loan)	2019–20	Eredivisie	13	0	0	0	—		—		13	0
Valencia	2025–26	La Liga	0	0	0	0	—		—		0	0
Career total			223	23	22	5	25	4	0	0	270	32

=== International ===
Appearances and goals by national team and year
National team	Year	Apps	Goals
Switzerland	2023	2	0
Switzerland	2024	2	0
Total		4	0

== Honours ==
FC Luzern

- Swiss Cup: 2020–21

Young Boys

- Swiss Super League: 2022–23
- Swiss Cup: 2022–23
