= Miguel Chaiwa =

Zambian footballer (born 1984)

Personal information
- Full name: Miguel Changa Chaiwa
- Date of birth: 7 June 2004 (age 22)
- Place of birth: Luanshya, Zambia
- Height: 1.81 m (5 ft 11 in)
- Position: Defensive midfielder

Team information
- Current team: Hibernian
- Number: 14

Youth career
- 2019–2022: Shamuel Academy
- 2022: → Atletico Lusaka (loan)

Senior career*
Years	Team	Apps	(Gls)
2022–2025	Young Boys U21	19	(0)
2022–2025	Young Boys	19	(0)
2024	→ Schaffhausen (loan)	14	(0)
2025–	Hibernian	28	(1)

International career^{‡}
2019–2020	Zambia U17	9	(1)
2022–	Zambia	11	(0)
- * Club domestic league appearances and goals as of 20 May 2026 ‡ National team caps and goals as of 10 September 2024

Miguel Changa Chaiwa (born 7 June 2004) is a Zambian professional footballer who plays as a defensive midfielder for Scottish Premiership club Hibernian and the Zambia national team.

== Club career ==
A youth product of Shamuel Academy, Chaiwa joined the Zambian club Atletico Lusaka on loan in 2022.

=== Young Boys ===
He transferred to the Swiss club Young Boys on 14 June 2022, signing a 4-year contract. On 14 February 2024, Chaiwa moved on loan to Schaffhausen.

=== Hibernian ===
Chaiwa moved to Scottish Premiership club Hibernian in August 2025 for an undisclosed transfer fee. He scored his first goal for the club on this third appearance, on 28 August 2025, during a UEFA Conference League playoff against Legia Warszawa.

== International career ==
Chaiwa represented the Zambia U17s in 2019 and 2020. He debuted for the senior Zambia national team in a friendly 3–1 loss to Iraq on 20 March 2022.

On 10 December 2025, Chaiwa was called up to the Zambia squad for the 2025 Africa Cup of Nations.

== Personal life ==
Chaiwa's father, Changa was also a professional footballer in Zambia.

== Career statistics ==
=== Club ===
As of match played 3 May 2025

Appearances and goals by club, season and competition
Club	Season	League			National Cup		Europe		Other		Total	
Club	Season	Division	Apps	Goals	Apps	Goals	Apps	Goals	Apps	Goals	Apps	Goals
Young Boys U21	2022–23	Swiss Promotion League	11	0	–		–		–		11	0
Young Boys U21	2023–24	Swiss Promotion League	8	0	–		–		–		8	0
Young Boys U21	Total		19	0	–		–		–		19	0
Young Boys	2022–23	Swiss Super League	6	0	2	1	3 (Note: Appearances in UEFA Conference League)	0	–		11	1
Young Boys	2023–24	Swiss Super League	3	0	1	0	1 (Note: Appearances in UEFA Champions League)	0	–		5	0
Young Boys	2024–25	Swiss Super League	10	0	2	0	3	0	–		15	0
Young Boys	Total		19	0	5	1	7	0	–		31	1
Schaffhausen (loan)	2023–24	Swiss Challenge League	14	0	–		–		–		14	0
Career total			52	0	5	1	7	0	0	0	64	1

=== International ===
As of match played 10 September 2024

Appearances and goals by national team and year
National team	Year	Apps	Goals
Zambia	2023	3	0
Zambia	2024	8	0
Total		11	0

== Honours ==
Young Boys

- Swiss Super League: 2022–23
- Swiss Cup: 2022–23
