= Dario Marzino =

Swiss footballer (born 1996)

Personal information
- Full name: Dario Nicola Marzino
- Date of birth: 19 September 1996 (age 30)
- Place of birth: Thun, Switzerland
- Height: 1.84 m (6 ft 0 in)
- Position: Goalkeeper

Team information
- Current team: Young Boys
- Number: 40

Youth career
- 2005–2008: Dürrenast
- 2008–2012: Thun
- 2012–2013: Young Boys

Senior career*
Years	Team	Apps	(Gls)
2013–2019	Young Boys U21	95	(0)
2015–2021	Young Boys	1	(0)
2020–2021	→ Winterthur (loan)	33	(0)
2021–2022	Schaffhausen	1	(0)
2022–	Young Boys	0	(0)

International career^{‡}
2016	Switzerland U20	2	(0)
- * Club domestic league appearances and goals as of 05:11, 5 June 2023 (UTC) ‡ National team caps and goals as of 05:11, 5 June 2023 (UTC)

Dario Nicola Marzino (born 19 September 1996) is a Swiss professional footballer who plays as a goalkeeper for the Swiss club Young Boys.

== Professional career ==
Marzino is a youth product of Dürrenast and Thun, before moving to the youth academy of Young Boys in 2012. From 2013 to 2019, he was the starter with Young Boys reserve side. In the summer of 2015, he was formally promoted to Young Boys' senior team, where he acted as backup goalkeeper. He made his senior and professional debut with Young Boys as a late substitute on 3 August 2020, a 3–1 win over FC St. Gallen to end their Championship winning season and replacing Marco Wölfli in his last ever game. He was the backup goalkeeper for Young Boys as they won consecutive league titles from 2017 to 2020. He joined Winterthur on a season-long loan in the Swiss Challenge League on 8 September 2020. On 24 September 2021, he moved to Schaffhausen once more in the Swiss Challenge League. He returned to Young Boys as the third goalkeeper for the 2022-23 season.

== International career ==
Marzino is a youth international for Switzerland, having played for the Switzerland U20s in 2016.

== Honours ==
Young Boys

- Swiss Super League: 2017–18, 2018–19, 2019–20, 2022–23
- Swiss Cup: 2019–20, 2022–23
