= Joel Monteiro =

Portuguese footballer

Personal information
- Full name: Joel Filipe Sousa Monteiro
- Date of birth: 1 May 1991 (age 35)
- Place of birth: Porto, Portugal
- Height: 1.80 m (5 ft 11 in)
- Position: Right-back

Team information
- Current team: Salgueiros
- Number: 23

Youth career
- 1999–2010: Salgueiros

Senior career*
Years	Team	Apps	(Gls)
2010–2014	Salgueiros	105	(5)
2014–2019	Famalicão	90	(2)
2019–2020	Casa Pia	19	(0)
2020–2021	Académico de Viseu	25	(0)
2021–2023	Amora	37	(0)
2023–2024	Vitória Setúbal	32	(2)
2024–2025	Varzim	26	(0)
2025–2026	São João de Ver	27	(1)
2026–	Salgueiros	4	(0)
- * Club domestic league appearances and goals as of 13 September 2026

Joel Filipe Sousa Monteiro (born 1 May 1991) is a Portuguese-French footballer who plays as a right-back for Campeonato de Portugal club Salgueiros.

== Football career ==
On 26 August 2015, Monteiro made his professional debut with Famalicão in a 2015–16 Segunda Liga match against Vitória Guimarães B.
