= Leandro Zbinden =

Swiss footballer (born 2002)

Personal information
- Full name: Leandro José Zbinden
- Date of birth: 30 July 2002 (age 24)
- Place of birth: Fribourg, Switzerland
- Height: 1.86 m (6 ft 1 in)
- Position: Goalkeeper

Team information
- Current team: Bulle
- Number: 99

Youth career
- 2010–2014: Plaffeien
- 2014–2017: Fribourg
- 2017–2020: Young Boys

Senior career*
Years	Team	Apps	(Gls)
2020–2023	Young Boys U21	29	(0)
2021–2023	Young Boys	2	(0)
2024–2025	Étoile Carouge	3	(0)
2025	→ Bulle (loan)	13	(0)
2025	Grand-Saconnex	0	(0)
2026–	Bulle	22	(0)

International career^{‡}
2016	Switzerland U15	1	(0)
- * Club domestic league appearances and goals as of 1 October 2026 ‡ National team caps and goals as of 07:41, 3 June 2023 (UTC)

Leandro José Zbinden (born 30 July 2002) is a Swiss professional footballer who plays as a goalkeeper for Bulle.

== Professional career ==
Zbinden is a youth academy of Plaffeien, Fribourg, and Young Boys, before moving to the reserves of Young Boys in 2020. He made his professional debut with Young Boys in a 1–1 Swiss Super League tie with Basel on 15 December 2021.

== International career ==
Born in Switzerland, Zbinden is of Brazilian descent. He is a youth international for Switzerland, having represented the Switzerland U15s in 2016.
