= Patrick Pflücke =

German footballer

Personal information
- Date of birth: 30 November 1996 (age 29)
- Place of birth: Dresden, Germany
- Height: 1.70 m (5 ft 7 in)
- Position: Attacking midfielder

Team information
- Current team: Charleroi
- Number: 14

Youth career
- SC Borea Dresden
- 2010–2011: Dynamo Dresden
- 2011–2014: Mainz 05

Senior career*
Years	Team	Apps	(Gls)
2014–2017	Mainz 05 II	78	(1)
2014	Mainz 05	1	(0)
2017–2018	Borussia Dortmund II	27	(2)
2018–2020	KFC Uerdingen 05	44	(2)
2020–2022	Roda JC Kerkrade	71	(27)
2022–2023	Servette	36	(6)
2023–2025	Mechelen	72	(9)
2025–	Charleroi	35	(4)

International career^{‡}
2010–2011	Germany U15	4	(0)
2011–2012	Germany U16	4	(2)
2012–2013	Germany U17	9	(4)
2013–2014	Germany U18	9	(3)
2014	Germany U19	3	(1)
- * Club domestic league appearances and goals as of 1 June 2026 ‡ National team caps and goals as of 14 October 2014

Patrick Pflücke (born 30 November 1996) is a German professional footballer who plays as an attacking midfielder for Belgian Pro League club Charleroi.

== Club career ==
Pflücke joined the academy of 1. FSV Mainz 05 in 2011 from Dynamo Dresden. He made his 3. Liga debut with Mainz 05 II at 6 August 2014 against MSV Duisburg. On 19 December 2014 he made his Bundesliga debut against Bayern Munich replacing Pablo de Blasis after 81 minutes in a 2–1 home defeat.

On 5 June 2022, Pflücke signed a two-year contract with Servette of the Swiss Super League.

On 21 August 2023, Pflücke signed a three-year contract with Mechelen of the Jupiler Pro League. During his first game against VC Westerlo on 26 August 2023, he entered the field after 57 minutes when Mechelen was 2-0 down, but after 3 assists from Pflücke ended the game with a 2-3 victory.

On 2 September 2025, Pflücke moved to Charleroi on a two-year deal.

== International career ==
Pflücke represented Germany internationally on junior levels, from Under-15 to Under-19.

== Honours ==
Individual

- Swiss Super League Team of the Year: 2022-23
