= 2022–23 Swiss Cup =

Tournament details
- Country: Switzerland
- Date: 19 August 2022 – 4 June 2023
- Teams: 64

Final positions
- Champions: Young Boys (8th title)
- Runners-up: Lugano

Tournament statistics
- Matches played: 63
- Top goal scorer(s): Chadrac Akolo; Mickaël Almeida (4 goals each)

The 2022–23 Swiss Cup, or Schweizer Pokal, was the 98th season of Switzerland's annual football cup competition. It featured 64 teams from the first to the eight tier of the Swiss football league. The first round was played from 19 to 21 August 2022. The final took place on 4 June 2023.

Lugano was the reigning Cup champion, but lost in the final to Young Boys.

== Participating teams ==
2022-23 Super League; 10 teams	2022-23 Challenge League; 9 teams	2022-23 Promotion League; 9 teams	2022-23 1. Liga; 14 teams	2022-23 2. Liga Interregional; 5 teams	2022-23 2. Liga; 12 teams	2022-23 Regional lower leagues 5 teams
FC Basel; Grasshopper Club Zürich; FC Lugano; FC Luzern; Servette FC; FC Sion; FC St. Gallen 1879; FC Winterthur; BSC Young Boys; FC Zürich	FC Aarau; AC Bellinzona; FC Lausanne-Sport; FC Stade Lausanne-Ouchy; FC Schaffhausen; FC Thun; FC Wil 1900; Neuchâtel Xamax FCS; Yverdon-Sport FC	FC Bavois; FC Bulle; FC Breitenrain; SC Cham; FC Chiasso; Étoile Carouge FC; SC Kriens; FC Stade Nyonnais; FC Rapperswil-Jona	CS Chênois; FC Grand-Saconnex; FC Köniz; FC Kreuzlingen; FC La Chaux-de-Fonds; FC Linth 04; Meyrin FC; FC Muri; FC Portalban/Gletterens; FC Rotkreuz; FC Schötz; FC Solothurn; FC Wettswil-Bonstetten; FC Wohlen	FC Gambarogno-Contone; FC Ibach; CS Italien GE; FC Rorschach-Goldach 17; FC Widnau	FC Allschwil; FC Arbedo-Castione; ASI Audax-Friul; FC Bischofszell; FC Bosporus; FC Gland; FC Littau; FC Sarmenstorf; FC Saxon Sports; FC Schoenberg; FC Subingen; FC Wiedikon ZH	3. Liga; FC Affoltern am Albis; Compesières FC; FC Goldstern; FC Wittenbach; 4. Liga; FC Sternenberg

== Schedule and venues ==
The table below shows the schedule of the competition. Home advantage for the first five rounds is granted to the team from the lower league, (Note: League is indicated in brackets: (SL): Swiss Super League (ChL): Swiss Challenge League (PL): Swiss Promotion League (1): 1. Liga (2I): 2. Liga Interregional (2): 2. Liga (3): 3. Liga (4): 4. Liga) if applicable. The final will be held at Stadion Wankdorf, Bern.

Round	Match date
Round 1 (round of 64)	19-21 August 2022
Round 2 (round of 32)	16-18 September 2022
Round 3 (round of 16)	8/9 November 2022; 31 January - 1 February 2023 (Note: Two games postponed due to scheduling conflicts.)
Round 4 (quarter-finals)	28 February - 2 March 2023
Round 5 (semi-finals)	4-6 April 2023
Round 6 (final)	4 June 2023

== Results ==
=== Round 1 ===
The matches of the first round were drawn on 5 July 2022 and will take place between 19 and 21 August 2022. Teams of the Swiss Challenge League and the Swiss Super League cannot be drawn against each other. Teams in bold continued to the next round of the competition.

19 August 2022	FC Bulle **(PL)**	**0–4**	**FC Thun (ChL)**	Bulle
19:00 CEST (UTC+2)		Report		Stadium: Stade de Bouleyres

19 August 2022	FC Stade Nyonnais **(PL)**	**1–4**	**Servette FC (SL)**	Nyon
19:30 CEST (UTC+2)		Report		Stadium: Colovray Sports Centre

19 August 2022	**FC La Chaux-de-Fonds (1)**	**1–0**	FC Solothurn **(1)**	La Chaux-de-Fonds
20:00 CEST (UTC+2)		Report		Stadium: Centre Sportif de la Charrière

20 August 2022	FC Schötz **(1)**	**0–4**	**FC Luzern (SL)**	Schötz
15:30 CEST (UTC+2)		Report		Stadium: Fussballanlage Wissenhusen

20 August 2022	**FC Rotkreuz (1)**	**3–0**	FC Chiasso **(PL)**	Rotkreuz
16:00 CEST (UTC+2)		Report		Stadium: Sportpark/Dorfmatt Rotkreuz

20 August 2022	FC Bavois **(PL)**	**1–3**	**Yverdon-Sport FC (ChL)**	Bavois
16:00 CEST (UTC+2)		Report		Stadium: Stade des Peupliers

20 August 2022	**FC Wohlen (1)**	**4–4** (a.e.t.) (**5–3** p)	FC Kreuzlingen **(1)**	Wohlen
16:00 CEST (UTC+2)		Report		Stadium: Stadion Niedermatten

20 August 2022	FC Affoltern a/A **(3)**	**1–2**	**FC Sarmentorf (2)**	Affoltern am Albis
16:00 CEST (UTC+2)		Report		Stadium: Sportanlagen Im Moos

20 August 2022	FC Wettswil-Bonstetten **(1)**	**0–4**	**Grasshopper Club Zürich (SL)**	Wettswil am Albis
17:00 CEST (UTC+2)		Report	25' Momoh; 41' (pen.) Pusic; (red card) 45' Ribeiro; 71', 87' Schettine	Stadium: Sportplatz Moos; Referee: Fedayi San

20 August 2022	FC Wittenbach **(3)**	**1–2** (a.e.t.)	**AC Arbedo-Castione (2)**	Wittenbach
17:00 CEST (UTC+2)		Report		Stadium: Grüntal

20 August 2022	FC Sternenberg **(4)**	**2–4**	**FC Goldstern (3)**	Gasel
17:00 CEST (UTC+2)		Report		Stadium: Schlatt

20 August 2022	FC Bischofszell **(2)**	**0–8**	**FC Aarau (ChL)**	Bischofszell
17:15 CEST (UTC+2)		Report		Stadium: Bruggfeld

20 August 2022	CS Chênois **(1)**	**1–3** (a.e.t.)	**FC Sion (SL)**	Chêne-Bourg
17:30 CEST (UTC+2)		Report		Stadium: Stade des Trois-Chêne

20 August 2022	**FC Portalban/Gletterens (1)**	**1–0**	FC Grand-Saconnex **(1)**	Delley-Portalban
17:30 CEST (UTC+2)		Report		Stadium: Centre Sportif Portalban

20 August 2022	FC Littau **(2)**	**0–6**	**FC Wil (ChL)**	Littau
18:00 CEST (UTC+2)		Report		Stadium: Ruopigen

20 August 2022	FC Saxon Sports **(2)**	**0–2**	**Meyrin FC (1)**	Saxon
18:00 CEST (UTC+2)		Report		Stadium: Complexe sportif du Pérosé

20 August 2022	CS Italien GE **(2I)**	**2–5**	**FC Stade Lausanne-Ouchy (ChL)**	Petit-Lancy
20:00 CEST (UTC+2)		Report		Stadium: Stade du Bois-de-la-Bâtie

21 August 2022	FC Widnau **(2I)**	**1–4**	**AC Bellinzona (ChL)**	Widnau
14:00 CEST (UTC+2)		Report		Stadium: Aegeten

21 August 2022	SC Cham **(PL)**	**0–4**	**FC Zürich (SL)**	Cham
14:00 CEST (UTC+2)		Report	17', 43' (pen.), 88' Tosin; 83' Krasniqi	Stadium: Eizmoos

21 August 2022	FC Muri **(1)**	**0–7**	**FC Winterthur (SL)**	Wohlen (Note: Venue moved due to construction.)
14:30 CEST (UTC+2)		Report	9' Schättin; 45' Di Giusto; 45+3' Gelmi; 48' Corbaz; 55' Francisco Rodríguez; 71' Kamberi; 85' Manzambi	Stadium: Stadion Niedermatten

21 August 2022	Compesières FC **(3)**	**0–5**	**Etoile Carouge FC (PL)**	Croix-de-Rozon
15:00 CEST (UTC+2)		Report		Stadium: Stade Alfred Comoli

21 August 2022	FC Linth 04 **(1)**	**1–5**	**FC Lugano (SL)**	Näfels
15:00 CEST (UTC+2)		Report		Stadium: Lintharena SGU

21 August 2022	FC Gland **(2)**	**0–4**	**FC Lausanne-Sport (ChL)**	Gland
15:00 CEST (UTC+2)		Report		Stadium: Centre sportif En Bord

21 August 2022	FC Ibach **(2I)**	**1–5**	**FC Schaffhausen (ChL)**	Ibach
15:00 CEST (UTC+2)		Report		Stadium: Gerbihof

21 August 2022	FC Subingen **(2)**	**0–2**	**FC Köniz (1)**	Subingen
15:00 CEST (UTC+2)		Report		Stadium: Affolter

21 August 2022	FC Allschwil **(2)**	**0–5**	**FC Basel (SL)**	Basel (Note: Venue moved due structural issues.)
16:00 CEST (UTC+2)	Lomma (yellow card) 11'; Borer (yellow card) 34'	SFV summary FCB report	9', 35', 40' Males; 14' Fink; (yellow card) 42' Katterbach; 73' Szalai	Stadium: Stadion Schützenmatte; Attendance: 7,500; Referee: (Switzerland) Tobias Thies

21 August 2022	FC Rorschach-Goldach 17 **(2I)**	**0–15**	**FC St. Gallen (SL)**	St. Gallen (Note: Venue moved due to original venue being previously occupied.)
16:00 CEST (UTC+2)		Report	1', 3', 27' von Moos; 13', 21' Guillemenot; 25' (pen.) Görtler; 30' Witzig; 38' Schubert; 45+1' (pen.), 46', 64', 70' Akolo; 84', 88' Karlen	Stadium: Espenmoos

21 August 2022	ASI Audax-Friul **(2)**	**1–5**	**Neuchâtel Xamax (ChL)**	Neuchâtel
16:00 CEST (UTC+2)		Report		Stadium: Pierre-à-Bot

21 August 2022	FC Bosporus **(2)**	**0–3**	**FC Breitenrain (PL)**	Bern
16:00 CEST (UTC+2)		Report		Stadium: Wyler

21 August 2022	FC Gambarogno-Contone **(2I)**	**0–5**	**SC Kriens (PL)**	Magadino
16:30 CEST (UTC+2)		Report		Stadium: Centro Sportivo Regionale

21 August 2022	FC Schoenberg **(2)**	**1–10**	**BSC Young Boys (SL)**	Fribourg
17:00 CEST (UTC+2)	Da Silva 66'	Report	8' Jankewitz; 18' (pen.), 28', 43' Nsame; 40', 45' Monteiro; 42' Chaiwa; 59' Ugrinic; 59' Benito; 71' Imeri	Stadium: Stade St-Léonard

21 August 2022	FC Wiedikon ZH **(2)**	**1–2**	**FC Rapperswil-Jona (PL)**	Zürich
17:30 CEST (UTC+2)		Report		Stadium: Heuried

=== Round 2 ===
The matchups of the second round were drawn on 21 August 2022, following the conclusion of the first round. Teams of the Swiss Super League cannot be drawn against each other. The matches will be held between 16 and 18 September 2022.

16 September 2022	Neuchâtel Xamax **(ChL)**	**1–2**	**FC Thun (ChL)**	Neuchâtel
19:30 CEST (UTC+1)	Del Toro 30'	Report	Ndongo 33'; Toure 90+2'	Stadium: Stade de la Maladière; Attendance: 1,412

17 September 2022	Meyrin FC **(1)**	**0–4**	**FC Winterthur (SL)**	Meyrin
15:00 CEST (UTC+1)		Report	23' Corbaz; 52' Ballet; 79', 85' Buess	Stadium: Stade des Arbères

17 September 2022	AC Bellinzona **(ChL)**	**0–1** (a.e.t.)	**FC Luzern (SL)**	Bellinzona
16:00 CEST (UTC+1)		Report	105+3' Sorgic	Stadium: Stadio Comunale

17 September 2022	**FC Rotkreuz (1)**	**2–1** (a.e.t.)	SC Kriens **(PL)**	Rotkreuz
16:00 CEST (UTC+1)	Krasniqi 54'; Wellington 105+4'	Report	Pauli 31'	Stadium: Sportpark/Dorfmatt

17 September 2022	FC Köniz **(1)**	**1–2**	**FC Wohlen (1)**	Köniz
16:00 CEST (UTC+1)	Hajrullahu 52'	Report	Mituensi 36'; Urtic 69'	Stadium: Sportplatz Liebefeld-Hessgut

17 September 2022	Etoile Carouge FC **(PL)**	**2–4**	**FC St. Gallen (SL)**	Carouge
17:00 CEST (UTC+1)	Simbakoli 39'; Correia 44'	Report	15' Akolo; 56' Maglica; 71', 90+2' (pen.) Görtler	Stadium: Stade de la Fontenette

17 September 2022	FC Goldstern **(3)**	**0–3**	**Grasshopper Club Zürich (SL)**	Bremgarten bei Bern
17:00 CEST (UTC+1)		Report	(red card) 55' Seko; 56' Pusic; 65' Demhasaj; 80' Blasucci	Stadium: Sportanlage Bremgarten; Attendance: 2,518; Referee: Nico Gianforte

17 September 2022	FC Rapperswil-Jona **(PL)**	**0–2**	**FC Sion (SL)**	Jona
17:00 CEST (UTC+1)		Report	45+5' Stojilkovic; 50' Itaitinga	Stadium: Stadion Grünfeld

17 September 2022	FC La Chaux-de-Fonds **(1)**	**0–2**	**Servette FC (SL)**	La Chaux-de-Fonds
18:00 CEST (UTC+1)		Report	50' Rouiller; 67' Crivelli	Stadium: Centre Sportif de la Charrière

17 September 2022	FC Stade Lausanne-Ouchy **(ChL)**	**0–1**	**BSC Young Boys (SL)**	Lausanne
18:30 CEST (UTC+1)		Report	66' Itten; (yellow card) 44' (yellow-red card) 82' Rüegg	Stadium: Stade olympique de la Pontaise

17 September 2022	**AC Arbedo-Castione (2)**	**6–0**	FC Sarmentorf **(2)**	Arbedo-Castione
18:30 CEST (UTC+1)	Berera 19'; Bozzini 25'; Pocas 45'; Minorini 75'; Citrini 85'; Zivko 90+2'	Report		Stadium: Stadio Comunale Giubiasco

18 September 2022	**FC Schaffhausen (ChL)**	**4–1**	Yverdon-Sport FC **(ChL)**	Schaffhausen
14:00 CEST (UTC+1)	Bobadilla 18', 20'; Lurvink 45+1'; Sliskovic 90+4'	Report	Beyer 1'	Stadium: Wefox Arena

18 September 2022	FC Breitenrain **(PL)**	**0–4**	**FC Lugano (SL)**	Bern
15:00 CEST (UTC+1)		Report	Babic 47'; Aliseda 70', 89'; El Amine 86'	Stadium: Spitalacker

18 September 2022	FC Aarau **(ChL)**	**1–3** (a.e.t.)	**FC Basel (SL)**	Aarau
15:30 CEST (UTC+1)	Fazliu 10'; Njie (yellow card) 90' (yellow-red card) 98'; Conus (yellow card) 42' (red card) 109'	Report	43' (pen.) Augustin; 94' Lang; 119' Ndoye	Stadium: Stadion Brügglifeld

18 September 2022	**FC Lausanne-Sport (ChL)**	**3–2** (a.e.t.)	FC Zürich **(SL)**	Lausanne
16:00 CEST (UTC+1)	Labeau 24'; Turkes 90+5', 114'	Report	9' (o.g.) Husic; 36' Marchesano; (yellow card) 105' (yellow-red card) 117' Okita	Stadium: Stade de la Tuilière

18 September 2022	FC Portalban/Gletterens **(1)**	**0–2**	**FC Wil (ChL)**	Delley-Portalban
16:00 CEST (UTC+1)		Report	Lukembila 62'; Reichmuth 79'	Stadium: Centre Sportif Portalban

=== Round 3 ===
The matchups of the third round were drawn on 18 September 2022, following the conclusion of the second round. Six of the eight matches will be held on 8 and 9 November 2022. Due to the league match between FC Luzern and FC Basel being postponed to 9 November 2022, their games are scheduled for 31 January and 1 February 2023, respectively.

8 November 2022	**FC Rotkreuz (1)**	**2–1**	FC Schaffhausen **(ChL)**	Rotkreuz
20:00 CET (UTC+1)		Report		Stadium: Sportpark/Dorfmatt

8 November 2022	AC Arbedo-Castione **(2)**	**0–5**	**FC St. Gallen (SL)**	Arbedo-Castione
20:30 CET (UTC+1)		Report		Stadium: Stadio Comunale Giubiasco

9 November 2022	FC Wil **(ChL)**	**1–2** (a.e.t.)	**FC Sion (SL)**	Wil
19:30 CET (UTC+1)		Report		Stadium: Sportpark Bergholz

9 November 2022	FC Lausanne-Sport **(ChL)**	**1–5**	**BSC Young Boys (SL)**	Lausanne
20:15 CET (UTC+1)		Report		Stadium: Stade de la Tuilière

9 November 2022	FC Wohlen **(1)**	**2–5** (a.e.t.)	**Servette FC (SL)**	Wohlen
20:15 CET (UTC+1)		Report		Stadium: Stadion Niedermatten

9 November 2022	**FC Lugano (SL)**	**1–0**	FC Winterthur **(SL)**	Lugano
20:30 CET (UTC+1)	Bottani 67'	Report		Stadium: Cornaredo Stadium

31 January 2023	**FC Thun (ChL)**	**2–2** (a.e.t.) (**4–2** p)	FC Luzern **(SL)**	Thun
19:00 CET (UTC+1)	Castroman 54'; Oberlin 77'	Report	7' (pen.) Meyer; 79' Chader	Stadium: Stockhorn Arena
	**Penalties**
	Kyeremateng (penalty scored); Bürki (penalty scored); Bertone (penalty missed); Dzonlagic (penalty scored); Oberlin (penalty scored)		(penalty missed) Meyer; (penalty missed) Sorgić; (penalty scored) Emini; (penalty scored) Frýdek

1 February 2023	Grasshopper Club Zürich **(SL)**	**3–5**	**FC Basel (SL)**	Zürich
20:15 CET (UTC+1)	Seko 31', 71'; Dadashov 52' (pen.)	Report	29' Kade; 45+2' (pen.) Frei; 48', 90+3' Amdouni; 63' Adams	Stadium: Letzigrund; Attendance: 5,000

=== Quarter-finals ===
The quarter-finals were drawn on 9 November 2022. The matches will be held between 28 February and 2 March 2023.

28 February 2023	FC Thun **(ChL)**	**0–5**	**BSC Young Boys (SL)**	Thun
20:15 CEST (UTC+1)		Report	5' Rieder; 64' Itten; 66' Ugrinic; 76' Fassnacht; 83' Lauper	Stadium: Stockhorn Arena; Attendance: 10,014; Referee: Urs Schnyder

1 March 2023	FC Sion **(SL)**	**0–3**	**FC Lugano (SL)**	Sion
20:15 CEST (UTC+1)		Report	A: 62' Amoura; 72' (pen.) Aliseda; 81' Sabbatini	Stadium: Stade Tourbillon; Attendance: 4,180; Referee: Sandro Schärer

1 March 2023	FC St. Gallen **(SL)**	**1–2** (a.e.t.)	**FC Basel (SL)**	St. Gallen
20:15 CEST (UTC+1)	10' Guillemenot	Report	59' Zeqiri; 95' Amdouni	Stadium: Kybunpark; Attendance: 14,950; Referee: Fedayi San

2 March 2023	FC Rotkreuz **(1)**	**0–3**	**Servette FC (SL)**	Rotkreuz
20:15 CEST (UTC+1)		Report	33' Crivelli; 39' Stevanovic; 75' Pflücke	Stadium: Sportpark/Dorfmatt Rotkreuz; Attendance: 2,346; Referee: Lukas Fähndrich

=== Semi-finals ===
The semi-finals were drawn on 4 March 2023. Following the elimination of FC Thun and FC Rotkreuz of the Swiss Challenge League and the 1. Liga, respectively, only teams of the Swiss Super League remain. The games will be played on 4 and 5 April, respectively.

4 April 2023	FC Basel	**2–4**	**BSC Young Boys**	Basel
20:15 CEST (UTC+1)	Males 57'; Ndoye 71'	Report	3' (pen.), 63' Itten; 15' Rieder; 68' Elia	Stadium: St. Jakob Park; Attendance: 26,310; Referee: Urs Schnyder

5 April 2023	Servette FC	**2–2** (a.e.t.) (**3–5** p)	**FC Lugano**	Geneva
20:15 CEST (UTC+1)	Kutesa 22'; Crivelli 90+7'	Report	31', 40' Aliseda	Stadium: Stade de Genève; Attendance: 12,500; Referee: Fedayi San
	**Penalties**
	Stevanovic (penalty scored); Pflücke (penalty scored); Crivelli (penalty scored); Mbabu (penalty missed)		(penalty scored) Celar; (penalty scored) Bottani; (penalty scored) Amoura; (penalty scored) Macek; (penalty scored) Sabbatini

=== Final ===
The final was held on 4 June 2023 at Stadion Wankdorf.

4 June 2023
14:00 CEST (UTC+1)
Final

Young Boys	3–2	Lugano
Nsame 20', 45+3'; Elia 85'	Report	53' Bottani; 87' Steffen

Stadion Wankdorf, Bern
Attendance: 31,500
Referee: Lukas Fähndrich
