= 2020–21 BSC Young Boys season =

Young Boys
2020–21 season
- Chairman: Hanspeter Kienberger
- Manager: Gerardo Seoane
- Stadium: Stadion Wankdorf
- Swiss Super League: 1st (champions)
- Swiss Cup: Third round
- UEFA Champions League: Third qualifying round
- UEFA Europa League: Round of 16
- Top goalscorer: League: Jean-Pierre Nsame (19); All: Jean-Pierre Nsame (26)
Home colours	Away colours	Third colours

The 2020–21 BSC Young Boys season was the club's 96th season in existence and the club's 25th consecutive season in the top flight of Swiss football. In addition to the domestic league, Young Boys participated in this season's editions of the Swiss Cup, the UEFA Champions League and the UEFA Europa League. The season covered the period from 19 September 2020 to 30 June 2021.

On 18 April 2021, Young Boys secured their fourth straight league title, and the club's fifteenth overall, with a 3–0 home win over Lugano.

== Players ==
=== First-team squad ===
As of 15 March 2021

Note: Flags indicate national team as defined under FIFA eligibility rules; some limited exceptions apply. Players may hold more than one non-FIFA nationality.

No.	Pos.	Nation	Player
4	DF	GUI	Mohamed Ali Camara
5	DF	SUI	Cédric Zesiger
6	MF	SUI	Esteban Petignat
7	MF	SUI	Marvin Spielmann
8	MF	SUI	Vincent Sierro
10	MF	SRB	Miralem Sulejmani
11	MF	GER	Gianluca Gaudino
13	MF	CMR	Moumi Ngamaleu
15	FW	COD	Meschak Elia
16	MF	SUI	Christian Fassnacht
17	FW	USA	Theoson Siebatcheu (on loan from Rennes)
18	FW	CMR	Jean-Pierre Nsame
19	FW	SUI	Felix Mambimbi

No.	Pos.	Nation	Player
20	MF	SUI	Michel Aebischer
21	DF	SUI	Ulisses Garcia
24	DF	SUI	Quentin Maceiras
25	DF	FRA	Jordan Lefort
26	GK	SUI	David von Ballmoos
28	DF	SUI	Fabian Lustenberger (captain)
30	MF	SUI	Sandro Lauper
35	MF	LUX	Christopher Martins
36	DF	SUI	Silvan Hefti
43	GK	SUI	Joschua Neuenschwander
60	MF	SUI	Fabian Rieder
91	GK	SUI	Guillaume Faivre

=== Out on loan ===
Note: Flags indicate national team as defined under FIFA eligibility rules; some limited exceptions apply. Players may hold more than one non-FIFA nationality.

No.	Pos.	Nation	Player
11	FW	ALB	Taulant Seferi (at Tirana until 30 June 2021)
14	DF	SUI	Nicolas Bürgy (at Paderborn until 30 June 2021)
24	DF	SUI	Jan Kronig (at Wil until 30 June 2021)

== Transfers ==
=== In ===
No.	Pos	Player	Transferred from	Fee	Date	Source
25	DF	(France) Jordan Lefort	(France) Amiens	Undisclosed	17 July 2020	
17	FW	(United States) Theoson Siebatcheu	(France) Rennes	Loan	13 September 2020	

=== Out ===
No.	Pos	Player	Transferred to	Fee	Date	Source
99	FW	(France) Guillaume Hoarau	(Switzerland) FC Sion	Free	18 September 2020	

== Pre-season and friendlies ==
Win Draw Loss

8 September 2020 Friendly	Young Boys (Switzerland)	5–2	(Switzerland) Lausanne-Sport	Bern, Switzerland
15:00 CEST (UTC+2)	Gaudino 39'; Ngamaleu 52'; Maier 67', 76'; Vladi 84'	Report	Hysenaj 68', 81'	Stadium: Stadion Wankdorf; Attendance: 20; Referee: Urs Schnyder

9 October 2020 Friendly	Young Boys (Switzerland)	1–0	(Switzerland) Neuchâtel Xamax	Bern, Switzerland
14:00 CEST (UTC+2)	Eberhard 73'	Report		Stadium: Stadion Wankdorf; Attendance: 0

12 January 2021 Friendly	Young Boys (Switzerland)	4–1	(Switzerland) Chiasso	Bern, Switzerland
15:00 CET (UTC+1)	Nsame 3'; Fassnacht 27'; Siebatcheu 59'; Vladi 77'	Report	Bahloul 49' (pen.)	Stadium: Stadion Wankdorf; Attendance: 0 Referee: Alain Bieri

16 January 2021 Friendly	Young Boys (Switzerland)	5–1	(Switzerland) Stade Lausanne Ouchy	Bern, Switzerland
13:00 CET (UTC+1)	Bamba 5' (o.g.); Nsame 27', 33'; Spielmann 46'; Elia 66'	Report	Amdouni 89'	Stadium: Stadion Wankdorf; Attendance: 0 Referee: Anojen Kanagasingam

16 January 2021 Friendly	Young Boys (Switzerland)	3–2	(Switzerland) Aarau	Bern, Switzerland
16:00 CET (UTC+1)	Sulejmani 11'; Mambimbi 30'; Siebatcheu 39'	Report	Zverotić 49'; Avdyli 73'	Stadium: Stadion Wankdorf; Attendance: 0 Referee: Urs Schnyder

== Competitions ==
=== Overview ===
Competition	First match	Last match	Starting round	Final position	Record							
Competition	First match	Last match	Starting round	Final position	Pld	W	D	L	GF	GA	GD	Win %
Swiss Super League	19 September 2020	21 May 2021	Matchday 1	Winners	36	25	9	2	74	29	+45	69.44
Swiss Cup	8 April 2021		Round 3	Round 3	1	0	0	1	1	4	−3	0.00
UEFA Champions League	26 August 2020	16 September 2020	Second qualifying round	Third qualifying round	2	1	0	1	3	4	−1	50.00
UEFA Europa League	1 October 2020	18 March 2021	Play-off round	Round of 16	10	5	1	4	16	15	+1	50.00
Total					49	31	10	8	94	52	+42	63.27

Source: Soccerway

=== Swiss Super League ===
==== League table ====
Pos	Team	Pld	W	D	L	GF	GA	GD	Pts	Qualification or relegation
1	Young Boys (C)	36	25	9	2	74	29	+45	84	Qualification for the Champions League second qualifying round
2	Basel	36	15	8	13	60	53	+7	53	Qualification for the Europa Conference League second qualifying round
3	Servette	36	14	8	14	45	56	−11	50	Qualification for the Europa Conference League second qualifying round
4	Lugano	36	12	13	11	40	42	−2	49	
5	Luzern	36	12	10	14	62	59	+3	46	Qualification for the Europa Conference League third qualifying round (Note: Luzern qualified for the Europa Conference League third qualifying round as winners of the 2020–21 Swiss Cup.)

Source: Swiss Super League
Rules for classification: 1) Points; 2) Goal difference; 3) Goals scored; 4) Head-to-head goal difference; 5) Away goals scored; 6) Draw.
(C) Champions

==== Results summary ====
Overall								Home						Away					
Pld	W	D	L	GF	GA	GD	Pts	W	D	L	GF	GA	GD	W	D	L	GF	GA	GD
36	25	9	2	74	29	+45	84	14	3	1	38	14	+24	11	6	1	36	15	+21

Source: FBref

==== Results by round ====
Round	1	2	3	4	5	6	7	8	9	10	11	12	13	14	15	16	17	18	19	20	21	22	23	24	25	26	27	28	29	30	31	32	33	34	35	36
Ground	H	A	H	A	H	A	H	H	A	A	H	A	H	A	A	H	H	A	H	A	H	A	A	H	A	H	A	H	H	A	H	A	H	A	H	A
Result	W	D	W	D	W	W	D	W	W	W	L	W	D	W	D	W	W	W	W	W	W	D	D	D	D	W	W	W	W	W	W	L	W	W	W	W
Position	2	4	3	1	1	1	1	1	1	1	1	1	1	1	1	1	1	1	1	1	1	1	1	1	1	1	1	1	1	1	1	1	1	1	1	1

Source: Swiss Super League
A = Away; H = Home; W = Win; D = Draw; L = Loss

==== Matches ====
19 September 2020 1	Young Boys	2–1	Zürich	Bern
19:00 CEST (UTC+2)	Mambimbi 24'; Fassnacht 69'; Zesiger (yellow card) 16' (yellow-red card) 70'	Report	Kololli 5'; Ceesay (yellow card) 28'; Kryeziu (yellow card) 45' (yellow-red card) 56'	Stadium: Stadion Wankdorf; Attendance: 1,000; Referee: Urs Schnyder

26 September 2020 2	Sion	0–0	Young Boys	Sion
19:00 CEST (UTC+2)		Report		Stadium: Stade Tourbillon; Attendance: 1,000; Referee: Alain Bieri

4 October 2020 3	Young Boys	1–0	Vaduz	Bern
16:00 CEST (UTC+2)	Nsame 62'	Report		Stadium: Stadion Wankdorf; Attendance: 11,660; Referee: Lionel Tschudi

17 October 2020 4	Servette	0–0	Young Boys	Geneva
19:00 CEST (UTC+2)	Fofana (yellow card) 30' (yellow-red card) 39'; Céspedes (yellow card) 66'	Report	Sierro (yellow card) 63' (yellow-red card) 66'; Lefort (yellow card) 81'	Stadium: Stade de Genève; Attendance: 5,240; Referee: Lukas Fähndrich

25 October 2020 5	Young Boys	2–1	Luzern	Bern
16:00 CEST (UTC+2)	Elia 58'; Camara (yellow card) 60'; Nsame 69', (yellow card) 85'	Report	Schulz 19' (pen.); Álex Carbonell (yellow card) 33'; Tasar (yellow card) 45+1'	Stadium: Stadion Wankdorf; Attendance: 0 Referee: Sandro Schärer

8 November 2020 7	Young Boys	0–0	St. Gallen	Bern
16:00 CET (UTC+1)	Aebischer (yellow card) 45'	Report	Fazliji (yellow card) 20'; Stillhart (yellow card) 76'; Stergiou (yellow card) 79'; Youan (yellow card) 81'	Stadium: Stadion Wankdorf; Attendance: 50; Referee: Urs Schnyder

21 November 2020 8	Young Boys	2–1	Basel	Bern
20:30 CET (UTC+1)	Sierro (yellow card) 26'; Nsame 41'; Elia 61'	Report	Arthur Cabral 22' (pen.), (yellow card) 77'; Afimico Pululu (yellow card) 43'	Stadium: Stadion Wankdorf; Attendance: 15; Referee: Fedayi San

29 November 2020 9	Lausanne-Sport	0–3	Young Boys	Lausanne
16:00 CET (UTC+1)	Puertas (yellow card) 33'; Pedro Brazão (yellow card) 55'	Report	Lefort 30'; Sulejmani (yellow card) 48'; Mambimbi 53'; Maceiras (yellow card) 64'; Nsame 87'	Stadium: Stade de la Tuilière; Attendance: 5 Referee: Adrien Jaccottet

6 December 2020 10	Luzern	2–3	Young Boys	Lucerne
16:00 CET (UTC+1)	Tasar (yellow card) 18'; Schulz 53' (pen.); Sorgić 64'; Schaub (yellow card) 67'; Ugrinic (yellow card) 78'	Report	Nsame 19' (pen.); Fassnacht 24'; Garcia 27'; Aebischer (yellow card) 52'; Rieder (yellow card) 70'; Bürgy (yellow card) 87'	Stadium: Swissporarena; Attendance: 50; Referee: Urs Schnyder

13 December 2020 11	Young Boys	1–2	Servette	Bern
16:00 CET (UTC+1)	Maceiras (yellow card) 54'; Mambimbi 84'	Report	Schalk 22' 65'	Stadium: Stadion Wankdorf; Attendance: 5 Referee: Stefan Horisberger

16 December 2020 12	Basel	0–2	Young Boys	Basel
20:30 CET (UTC+1)	Jorge (yellow card) 38'	Report	Elia 12'; Nsame 20', (yellow card) 90+3'; Hefti (yellow card) 57'; Martins (yellow card) 75'; Zesiger (yellow card) 89'	Stadium: St. Jakob-Park; Attendance: 5 Referee: Sandro Schärer

19 December 2020 13	Young Boys	2–2	Lugano	Bern
18:15 CET (UTC+1)	Siebatcheu 19', 37' (pen.); Garcia (yellow card) 73'; Camara (yellow card) 77'	Report	Lavanchy (yellow card) 22'; Lovrić 28'; Kecskés (yellow card) 36'; Marić (yellow card) 66'; Bottani 70'; Custodio (yellow card) 79'	Stadium: Stadion Wankdorf; Attendance: 0 Referee: Adrien Jaccottet

22 December 2020 14	St. Gallen	1–2	Young Boys	St. Gallen
20:30 CET (UTC+1)	Letard (yellow card) 21'; Staubli 83'; Rüfli (yellow card) 89'	Report	Siebatcheu (yellow card) 62', (goal) 68', 72'; Aebischer (yellow card) 86'	Stadium: Kybunpark; Attendance: 0 Referee: Léonce Lionel Tscudi

20 January 2021 6	Lugano	0–2	Young Boys	Lugano
18:00 CET (UTC+1)	Čovilo (yellow card) 18'; Bottani (yellow card) 54'	Report	Fassnacht 55'; Nsame 75'; Aebischer (yellow card) 89'	Stadium: Stadio di Cornaredo; Referee: Sandro Schärer
Note: Match was postponed

24 January 2021 15	Vaduz	0–0	Young Boys	Vaduz
16:00 CET (UTC+1)	Obexer (yellow card) 56'; Çiçek (yellow card) 72'	Report	Camara (yellow card) 32'; Lefort (yellow card) 37'; Nsame (red card) 39'; Elia (yellow card) 76'	Stadium: Rheinpark Stadion; Referee: Lukas Fähndrich

31 January 2021 17	Young Boys	2–1	Sion	Bern
16:00 CET (UTC+1)	Ngamaleu 4'; Lauper 34'	Report	Zock (yellow card) 23'; Abdellaoui 26' (yellow card) 71'; Wakatsuki (yellow card) 78'	Stadium: Stadion Wankdorf; Referee: Urs Schnyder

3 February 2021 18	Zürich	1–4	Young Boys	Zürich
18:15 CET (UTC+1)	Domgjoni 76'	Report	Lauper 26'; Siebatcheu 43', 45', 63'	Stadium: Letzigrund; Referee: Alain Bieri

7 February 2021 19	Young Boys	4–2	Lausanne-Sport	Bern
16:00 CET (UTC+1)	Nsame 11', 24' (pen.), 33'; Fassnacht 19'	Report	Flo 59'; Ouattara 78'	Stadium: Stadion Wankdorf; Referee: Lionel Tschudi

10 February 2021 16	Young Boys	1–0	Lausanne-Sport	Bern
20:30 CET (UTC+1)	Siebatcheu 16'	Report		Stadium: Stadion Wankdorf; Referee: Luca Piccolo
Note: The match was originally scheduled for 27 January 2021, but was postponed.

14 February 2021 20	Lugano	1–3	Young Boys	Lugano
16:00 CET (UTC+1)	Gerndt 59'; Čovilo (yellow card) 71'; Macek (yellow card) 71'	Report	Nsame 10' (pen.); Elia 17'; Lauper 45+1'; Sulejmani (yellow card) 76'	Stadium: Stadio di Cornaredo; Referee: Stefan Horisberger

21 February 2021 21	Young Boys	2–0	Servette	Bern
16:00 CET (UTC+1)	Rouiller 4' (o.g.); Lustenberger (yellow card) 12'; Nsame 41'; Camara (yellow card) 62' (yellow-red card) 90+3'	Report	Clichy (yellow card) 50'	Stadium: Stadion Wankdorf; Referee: Alain Bieri

28 February 2021 22	Luzern	2–2	Young Boys	Lucerne
16:00 CET (UTC+1)	Burch (yellow card) 10'; Ugrinic 23', (yellow card) 90'; Knezevic (yellow card) 89'; Schulz 90+6'	Report	Zesiger (yellow card) 52'; Fassnacht 71'; Aebischer (yellow card) 79'; Knezevic 87' (o.g.); Nsame (yellow card) 88'	Stadium: Swissporarena; Referee: Adrien Jaccottet

3 March 2021 23	Basel	1–1	Young Boys	Basel
20:30 CET (UTC+1)	Males 20'; Klose (yellow card) 47'	Report	Lauper 26'; Aebischer (yellow card) 39'	Stadium: St. Jakob-Park; Referee: Fedayi San

6 March 2021 24	Young Boys	1–1	Vaduz	Bern
18:15 CET (UTC+1)	Rieder (yellow card) 33'; Maceiras (yellow card) 63'; Siebatcheu 81', (yellow card) 90'	Report	Lüchinger (yellow card) 38'; Schmid (yellow card) 47'; Đokić 55'; Gajić (yellow card) 61'; Di Giusto (yellow card) 64'	Stadium: Stadion Wankdorf; Referee: Luca Piccolo

14 March 2021 25	St. Gallen	2–2	Young Boys	St. Gallen
16:00 CET (UTC+1)	Fazliji (yellow card) 4'; Youan 9'; Ruiz (yellow card) 35', (goal) 74' (pen.); Görtler (yellow card) 63'	Report	Zesiger (yellow card) 29'; Nsame (yellow card) 31', (goal) 62' (pen.); Sierro (yellow card) 63'; Mambimbi (yellow card) 67'; Elia 82', (yellow card) 86'	Stadium: Kybunpark; Referee: Urs Schnyder

21 March 2021 26	Young Boys	4–0	Zürich	Bern
16:00 CET (UTC+1)	Maceiras 33', (yellow card) 55'; Mambimbi 62'; Siebatcheu 87'; Elia 90+1'	Report	Kramer (yellow card) 10'	Stadium: Stadion Wankdorf; Referee: Lionel Tschudi

4 April 2021 27	Sion	0–3	Young Boys	Sion
16:00 CEST (UTC+2)	Batata (yellow card) 45'; Grgić (yellow card) 57'	Report	Lauper (yellow card) 19'; Camara (yellow card) 53'; Hefti (yellow card) 76'; Lustenberger (yellow card) 78'; Nsame 86'; Spielmann 90+1' (pen.); Ngamaleu 90+2'	Stadium: Stade Tourbillon; Referee: Alain Bieri

11 April 2021 28	Young Boys	2–0	St. Gallen	Bern
16:00 CEST (UTC+2)	Siebatcheu (yellow card) 21'; Lustenberger (yellow card) 23'; Martins 62'; Nsame 83'	Report	Muheim (yellow card) 40'; Youan (yellow card) 44'; Cabral (yellow card) 63'	Stadium: Stadion Wankdorf; Referee: Adrien Jaccottet

18 April 2021 29	Young Boys	3–0	Lugano	Bern
16:00 CEST (UTC+2)	Nsame (yellow card) 29', (goal) 39', 68', 76' (pen.)	Report	Marić (yellow card) 75'; Lungoyi (yellow card) 90+1'	Stadium: Stadion Wankdorf; Referee: Urs Schnyder

22 April 2021 30	Zürich	1–2	Young Boys	Zürich
20:30 CEST (UTC+2)	Kramer 29'; Rohner (yellow card) 33'; Aiyegun (yellow card) 69'	Report	Kryeziu 8' (o.g.); Lefort (yellow card) 19'; Mambimbi 23'; Martins (yellow card) 44'; Maceiras (yellow card) 52'; Aebischer (yellow card) 83'	Stadium: Letzigrund; Attendance: 100; Referee: Adrien Jaccottet

25 April 2021 31	Young Boys	2–1	Sion	Bern
16:00 CEST (UTC+2)	Mambimbi 8'; Siebatcheu 76'	Report	Cavaré 24'; Batata (yellow card) 31'; Theler (yellow card) 78'	Stadium: Stadion Wankdorf; Attendance: 100; Referee: Lionel Tschudi

2 May 2021 32	Servette	2–1	Young Boys	Geneva
16:00 CEST (UTC+2)	Cognat (yellow card) 33'; Schalk (yellow card) 36'; Fofana 76'; Koné 82'; Valls (penalty missed) 90+2'	Report	Ngamaleu 90'; Garcia (yellow card) 90+1'	Stadium: Stade de Genève; Attendance: 100; Referee: Alain Bieri

8 May 2021 33	Young Boys	2–0	Basel	Bern
20:30 CEST (UTC+2)	Camara (yellow card) 13'; Fassnacht 71'; Martins 72'	Report	Van Wolfswinkel (yellow card) 87'	Stadium: Stadion Wankdorf; Attendance: 100; Referee: Lionel Tschudi

11 May 2021 34	Vaduz	0–2	Young Boys	Vaduz
18:15 CEST (UTC+2)	Schmid (yellow card) 18'; Simani (yellow card) 37'; Gajić (yellow card) 53'	Report	Siebatcheu 15'; Camara (yellow card) 27'; Fassnacht 79'; Maceiras (yellow card) 90+3'	Stadium: Rheinpark Stadion; Attendance: 100; Referee: Luca Piccolo

15 May 2021 35	Young Boys	5–2	Luzern	Bern
20:30 CEST (UTC+2)	Lefort (yellow card) 12'; Aebischer 35'; Zesiger (yellow card) 38'; Fassnacht 47', 60'; Nsame 74'; Spielmann 77'; Von Ballmoos (yellow card) 83'	Report	Schürpf (yellow card) 5'; Grether 9'; Tasar (yellow card) 38', (goal) 40'; Sidler (yellow card) 87'; Ugrinic (yellow card) 90+1'	Stadium: Stadion Wankdorf; Attendance: 100; Referee: Lukas Fähndrich

21 May 2021 36	Lausanne-Sport	2–4	Young Boys	Lausanne
20:30 CEST (UTC+2)	Loosli 29'; Bolingi 44'	Report	Spielmann 6'; Sierro (penalty missed) 26', 26'; Zesiger (yellow card) 56'; Fassnacht 71'; Aebischer 84'	Stadium: Stade de la Tuilière; Attendance: 100; Referee: Adrien Jaccottet

=== Swiss Cup ===
8 April 2021 Round 3	St. Gallen	4–1	Young Boys	St. Gallen
18:00 CEST (UTC+2)	Adamu 33'; Duah 50'; Lüchinger (yellow card) 67'; Görtler (yellow card) 71'; Ruiz 84' (pen.); Guillemenot 90+3'	Report	Sierro (yellow card) 7'; Fassnacht (yellow card) 42', (goal) 54'; Camara (yellow card) 90+4'	Stadium: Kybunpark; Referee: Sandro Schärer

=== UEFA Champions League ===
26 August 2020 Second qualifying round	Young Boys (Switzerland)	3–1	(Faroe Islands) KÍ	Bern, Switzerland
20:15 CEST (UTC+2)	Aebischer (yellow card) 36'; Nsame 51'; Sulejmani 57'; Ngamaleu 82'	Report	Klettskarð (yellow card) 24'; P. Johannesen (yellow card) 29'; Pavlović (yellow card) 32'; J. Johannesen 79', (yellow card) 83'; Andreasen (yellow card) 90+4'	Stadium: Stadion Wankdorf; Attendance: 0 (Note: Due to the COVID-19 pandemic in Europe, the match was played behind closed doors.); Referee: Athanasios Tzilos (Greece)

16 September 2020 Third qualifying round	Midtjylland (Denmark)	3–0	(Switzerland) Young Boys	Herning, Denmark
20:30 CEST (UTC+2)	Kaba (yellow card) 31'; Onyeka (yellow card) 41'; Lefort 51' (o.g.); Dreyer 63'; Sviatchenko (yellow card) 76'; Mabil 85'	Report	Aebischer (yellow card) 59'; Fassnacht (yellow card) 76'	Stadium: MCH Arena; Attendance: 0 Referee: Georgi Kabakov (Bulgaria)

=== UEFA Europa League ===
1 October 2020 Play-off round	Young Boys (Switzerland)	3–0	(Albania) Tirana	Bern, Switzerland
20:30 CEST (UTC+2)	Fassnacht 42'; Nsame 52', 64'	Report		Stadium: Stadion Wankdorf; Attendance: 0 Referee: Sergei Karasev (Russia)

==== Group stage ====
The group stage draw was held on 2 October 2020.

Pos	Team	Pld	W	D	L	GF	GA	GD	Pts	Qualification	ROM	YB	CLJ	CSS
1	(Italy) Roma	6	4	1	1	13	5	+8	13	Advance to knockout phase	—	3–1	5–0	0–0
2	(Switzerland) Young Boys	6	3	1	2	9	7	+2	10	Advance to knockout phase	1–2	—	2–1	3–0
3	(Romania) CFR Cluj	6	1	2	3	4	10	−6	5 (Note: Head-to-head points: CFR Cluj 4, CSKA Sofia 1.)		0–2	1–1	—	0–0
4	(Bulgaria) CSKA Sofia	6	1	2	3	3	7	−4	5		3–1	0–1	0–2	—

Source: UEFA
Rules for classification: Group stage tiebreakers
Notes:

22 October 2020 1	Young Boys (Switzerland)	1–2	(Italy) Roma	Bern, Switzerland
18:55 CEST (UTC+2)	Nsame 14' (pen.); Zesiger (yellow card) 52'; Mambimbi (yellow card) 76'; Gaudino (yellow card) 81'	Report	Karsdorp (yellow card) 39'; Fazio (yellow card) 50'; Juan Jesus (yellow card) 56'; Villar (yellow card) 58'; Peres (yellow card) 62', (goal) 79'; Kumbulla 74'	Stadium: Stadion Wankdorf; Attendance: 600; Referee: Carlos del Cerro Grande (Spain)

29 October 2020 2	CFR Cluj (Romania)	1–1	(Switzerland) Young Boys	Cluj-Napoca, Romania
21:00 CET (UTC+1)	Debeljuh (yellow card) 22'; Rondón 62'; Đoković (yellow card) 82'	Report	Fassnacht 69'; Aebischer (yellow card) 74'	Stadium: Stadionul Dr. Constantin Rădulescu; Attendance: 0 (Note: Due to the COVID-19 pandemic in Europe, the match was played behind closed doors.); Referee: Glenn Nyberg (Sweden)

5 November 2020 3	Young Boys (Switzerland)	3–0	(Bulgaria) CSKA Sofia	Bern, Switzerland
21:00 CET (UTC+1)	Mambimbi 2', 32'; Sulejmani 18'; Camara (yellow card) 51'; Aebischer (yellow card) 68'	Report	Youga (yellow card) 68'	Stadium: Stadion Wankdorf; Attendance: 0 Referee: Lawrence Visser (Belgium)

26 November 2020 4	CSKA Sofia (Bulgaria)	0–1	(Switzerland) Young Boys	Sofia, Bulgaria
18:55 CET (UTC+1)	Sinclair (yellow card) 90+2'	Report	Nsame 34', (yellow card) 90+4'	Stadium: Vasil Levski National Stadium; Attendance: 0 Referee: Fábio Veríssimo (Portugal)

3 December 2020 5	Roma (Italy)	3–1	(Switzerland) Young Boys	Rome, Italy
21:00 CET (UTC+1)	Calafiori (yellow card) 29', (goal) 59'; Mayoral 44'; Džeko 81'; Mkhitaryan (yellow card) 83'	Report	Nsame 34'; Elia (yellow card) 74'; Camara (red card) 83'	Stadium: Stadio Olimpico; Attendance: 0 Referee: Fran Jović (Croatia)

10 December 2020 6	Young Boys (Switzerland)	2–1	(Romania) CFR Cluj	Bern, Switzerland
18:55 CET (UTC+1)	Maier (yellow card) 84'; Nsame 90+3' (pen.), (red card) 90+5'; Sulejmani (yellow card) 90+5'; Gaudino 90+6'	Report	Păun (yellow card) 71'; Debeljuh 84'; Itu (yellow card) 84'; Burcă (yellow card) 88'; Bălgrădean (red card) 90'; Đoković (red card) 90+8'; Camora (yellow card) 90+9'	Stadium: Stadion Wankdorf; Attendance: 0 Referee: Benoît Bastien (France)

==== Knockout phase ====
===== Round of 32 =====
The draw for the round of 32 was held on 14 December 2020.

18 February 2021 First leg	Young Boys (Switzerland)	4–3	(Germany) Bayer Leverkusen	Bern, Switzerland
18:55 CET (UTC+1)	Fassnacht 3'; Siebatcheu 19', 89'; Elia 44'; Lefort (yellow card) 56'	Report	Schick 49', 52'; Diaby 68'; Sinkgraven (yellow card) 86'	Stadium: Stadion Wankdorf; Attendance: 0 Referee: Antonio Mateu Lahoz (Spain)

25 February 2021 Second leg	Bayer Leverkusen (Germany)	0–2 (3–6 agg.)	(Switzerland) Young Boys	Leverkusen, Germany
21:00 CET (UTC+1)	Sinkgraven (yellow card) 53'	Report	Siebatcheu 48'; Fassnacht 86'	Stadium: BayArena; Attendance: 0 Referee: Davide Massa (Italy)

===== Round of 16 =====
The draw for the round of 16 was held on 26 February 2021.

11 March 2021 First leg	Ajax (Netherlands)	3–0	(Switzerland) Young Boys	Amsterdam, Netherlands
18:55 CET (UTC+1)	Tagliafico (yellow card) 53'; Klaassen 62'; Tadić 82'; Brobbey 90+2'	Report	Lauper (yellow card) 49'; Aebischer (yellow card) 64'; Sierro (yellow card) 78'	Stadium: Johan Cruyff Arena; Attendance: 0 Referee: Marco Guida (Italy)

18 March 2021 Second leg	Young Boys (Switzerland)	0–2 (0–5 agg.)	(Netherlands) Ajax	Bern, Switzerland
21:00 CET (UTC+1)	Camara (yellow card) 38'; Nsame (yellow card) 90+4'	Report	Neres 21'; Tadić 49' (pen.); Rensch (yellow card) 73'	Stadium: Stadion Wankdorf; Attendance: 0 Referee: Bobby Madden (Scotland)

== Statistics ==
=== Squad statistics ===
Last updated on 21 May 2021.

No.	Pos	Nat	Player	Total		Swiss Super League		Swiss Cup		UEFA Champions League		UEFA Europa League	
No.	Pos	Nat	Player	Apps	Goals	Apps	Goals	Apps	Goals	Apps	Goals	Apps	Goals
Goalkeepers
26	GK	(Switzerland) SUI	David von Ballmoos	43	0	31	0	1	0	2	0	9	0
43	GK	(Switzerland) SUI	Joschua Neuenschwander	1	0	0+1	0	0	0	0	0	0	0
91	GK	(Switzerland) SUI	Guillaume Faivre	8	0	5+1	0	0	0	0	0	2	0
Defenders
4	DF	(Guinea) GUI	Mohamed Ali Camara	39	0	26+3	0	1	0	2	0	7	0
5	DF	(Switzerland) SUI	Cédric Zesiger	35	0	24+4	0	0	0	0	0	5+2	0
21	DF	(Switzerland) SUI	Ulisses Garcia	33	1	17+8	1	0	0	0+1	0	4+3	0
24	DF	(Switzerland) SUI	Quentin Maceiras	26	1	16+5	1	0+1	0	1	0	2+1	0
25	DF	(France) FRA	Jordan Lefort	40	1	19+9	1	1	0	2	0	8+1	0
28	DF	(Switzerland) SUI	Fabian Lustenberger	33	0	21	0	1	0	2	0	9	0
36	DF	(Switzerland) SUI	Silvan Hefti	43	0	23+7	0	1	0	1	0	11	0
Midfielders
6	MF	(Switzerland) SUI	Esteban Petignat	0	0	0	0	0	0	0	0	0	0
7	MF	(Switzerland) SUI	Marvin Spielmann	19	3	5+10	3	0	0	0+2	0	0+2	0
8	MF	(Switzerland) SUI	Vincent Sierro	28	1	12+5	1	1	0	1	0	5+4	0
10	MF	(Serbia) SRB	Miralem Sulejmani	37	2	17+11	0	0+1	0	2	1	4+2	1
11	MF	(Germany) GER	Gianluca Gaudino	34	1	7+17	0	0	0	0	0	0+10	1
13	MF	(Cameroon) CMR	Moumi Ngamaleu	40	4	18+10	3	1	0	2	1	8+1	0
16	MF	(Switzerland) SUI	Christian Fassnacht	49	15	27+9	10	1	1	2	0	10	4
20	MF	(Switzerland) SUI	Michel Aebischer	39	2	24+3	2	1	0	2	0	6+3	0
22	MF	(Switzerland) SUI	Nico Maier	2	0	1+1	0	0	0	0	0	0	0
30	MF	(Switzerland) SUI	Sandro Lauper	25	4	12+8	4	0+1	0	0	0	4	0
35	MF	(Luxembourg) LUX	Christopher Martins	14	2	9+2	2	0	0	1+1	0	0+1	0
60	MF	(Switzerland) SUI	Fabian Rieder	31	0	10+13	0	0	0	0	0	5+3	0
Forwards
15	FW	(Democratic Republic of the Congo) COD	Meschak Elia	37	7	16+9	6	1	0	0	0	7+4	1
17	FW	(United States) USA	Theoson Siebatcheu	43	15	14+18	12	0+1	0	0+1	0	2+7	3
18	FW	(Cameroon) CMR	Jean-Pierre Nsame	32	26	14+6	19	1	0	2	1	9	6
19	FW	(Switzerland) SUI	Felix Mambimbi	43	8	17+14	6	0+1	0	0+1	0	2+8	2
Players who have made an appearance this season but have left the club
14	DF	(Switzerland) SUI	Nicolas Bürgy	7	0	1+3	0	0	0	2+1	0	0	0

=== Goalscorers ===
Rank	No.	Pos	Nat	Name	Swiss Super League	Swiss Cup	Champions League	Europa League	Total
1	18	FW	(Cameroon)	Jean-Pierre Nsame	12	0	1	6	19
2	17	FW	(United States)	Theoson Siebatcheu	8	0	0	3	11
3	16	MF	(Switzerland)	Christian Fassnacht	5	0	0	4	9
4	15	FW	(Democratic Republic of the Congo)	Elia Meschak	4	0	0	1	5
4	19	FW	(Switzerland)	Felix Mambimbi	3	0	0	2	5
6	30	MF	(Switzerland)	Sandro Lauper	3	0	0	0	3
7	13	MF	(Cameroon)	Moumi Ngamaleu	1	0	1	0	2
7	10	MF	(Serbia)	Miralem Sulejmani	0	0	1	1	2
9	11	MF	(Germany)	Gianluca Gaudino	0	0	0	1	1
9	21	DF	(Switzerland)	Ulisses Garcia	1	0	0	0	1
9	25	DF	(France)	Jordan Lefort	1	0	0	0	1
Own goals					2	0	0	0	2
Totals					40	0	3	18	61

Last updated: 28 February 2021
UEFA

=== Clean sheets ===
Rank	No.	Pos	Nat	Name	Swiss Super League	Swiss Cup	Champions League	Europa League	Total
1	26	GK	(Switzerland)	David von Ballmoos	9	0	0	4	13
2	91	GK	(Switzerland)	Guillaume Faivre	1	0	0	0	1
Totals					10	0	0	4	14

Last updated: 25 February 2021
UEFA
