= 2019–20 BSC Young Boys season =

Young Boys
2019–20 season
- Chairman: Hanspeter Kienberger
- Manager: Gerardo Seoane
- Stadium: Stade de Suisse
- Swiss Super League: 1st (champions)
- Swiss Cup: Winners
- UEFA Champions League: Play-off round
- UEFA Europa League: Group stage
- Top goalscorer: League: Jean-Pierre Nsame (32); All: Jean-Pierre Nsame (41)
Home colours	Away colours	Third colours

The 2019–20 BSC Young Boys season was the club's 95th season in existence and the club's 24th consecutive season in the top flight of Swiss football. In addition to the domestic league, Young Boys participated in this season's editions of the Swiss Cup and the UEFA Champions League. The season covered the period from 1 July 2019 to 30 August 2020.

== Players ==
=== Current squad ===
As of 10 February 2020

Note: Flags indicate national team as defined under FIFA eligibility rules; some limited exceptions apply. Players may hold more than one non-FIFA nationality.

No.	Pos.	Nation	Player
1	GK	SUI	Marco Wölfli
3	DF	DEN	Frederik Sørensen (on loan from FC Köln)
4	DF	GUI	Mohamed Ali Camara
5	DF	SUI	Cédric Zesiger
6	MF	SUI	Esteban Petignat
7	MF	SUI	Marvin Spielmann
8	MF	SUI	Vincent Sierro
10	MF	SRB	Miralem Sulejmani
11	MF	GER	Gianluca Gaudino
13	MF	CMR	Moumi Ngamaleu
14	DF	SUI	Nicolas Bürgy
15	FW	COD	Meschak Elia
16	MF	SUI	Christian Fassnacht
18	FW	CMR	Jean-Pierre Nsame

No.	Pos.	Nation	Player
19	FW	SUI	Felix Mambimbi
20	MF	SUI	Michel Aebischer
21	DF	SUI	Ulisses Garcia
23	DF	SUI	Saidy Janko (on loan from Porto)
25	DF	FRA	Jordan Lefort (on loan from Amiens)
26	GK	SUI	David von Ballmoos
28	DF	SUI	Fabian Lustenberger (captain)
29	DF	SUI	Jordan Lotomba
30	MF	SUI	Sandro Lauper
35	MF	LUX	Christopher Martins
40	GK	SUI	Dario Marzino
41	FW	SUI	Samuel Ballet
99	FW	FRA	Guillaume Hoarau

=== Out on loan ===
Note: Flags indicate national team as defined under FIFA eligibility rules; some limited exceptions apply. Players may hold more than one non-FIFA nationality.

No.	Pos.	Nation	Player
17	FW	CIV	Roger Assalé (at Leganés until 30 June 2020)
24	DF	SUI	Jan Kronig (at Schaffhausen until 30 June 2020)
27	MF	SUI	Pedro Teixeira (at Kriens until 30 June 2020)

No.	Pos.	Nation	Player
77	MF	ALB	Taulant Seferi (at Neuchâtel Xamax until 30 June 2020)
—	MF	SUI	Joël Schmied (at Wil until 30 June 2020)

== Pre-season and friendlies ==
21 June 2019 Burkhalter Cup	Young Boys (Switzerland)	2–1	(Switzerland) Rapperswil-Jona	Bern, Switzerland
18:00 CEST (UTC+2)	Garcia 16'; Spielmann 42'	Report	13'	Stadium: Spitalacker; Attendance: 3'200

21 June 2019 Burkhalter Cup	Breitenrain (Switzerland)	0–4	(Switzerland) Young Boys	Bern, Switzerland
20:00 CEST (UTC+2)		Report	13' Sulejmani; 21' Sierro; 36' Maier; 41' Seferi	Stadium: Spitalacker; Attendance: 3'200

26 June 2019 Friendly	Vaduz (Liechtenstein)	1–0	(Switzerland) Young Boys	Vaduz, Liechtenstein
16:00 CEST (UTC+2)	Cicek 2'	Report		Stadium: Rheinpark Stadion; Attendance: 400

29 June 2019 Friendly	Young Boys (Switzerland)	3–1	(Germany) Stuttgart	Fügen, Austria
15:30 CEST (UTC+2)	Hoarau 4'; Nsame 4'; Petignat 83'	Report	25' González	Stadium: Sportplatz Schlitters; Attendance: 700

2 July 2019 Friendly	Young Boys (Switzerland)	0–0	(Bulgaria) Levski Sofia	Fügen, Austria
18:30 CEST (UTC+2)		Report		Stadium: Sportplatz Schlitters; Attendance: 300

10 July 2019 Uhrencup	Young Boys (Switzerland)	5–1	(Germany) Frankfurt	Biel/Bienne, Switzerland
20:00 CEST (UTC+2)	Hoarau 6'; Ngamaleu 31'; Nsame 68'; Gaudino 74'; Petignat 81'	Report	86' Joveljić	Stadium: Tissot Arena; Attendance: 5'039

13 July 2019 Friendly	Young Boys (Switzerland)	0–2	(Switzerland) Kriens	Bern, Switzerland
10:30 CEST (UTC+2)		Report	13' Tadić; 59' Kukeli	Stadium: Stade de Suisse; Attendance: 500

13 July 2019 Uhrencup	Young Boys (Switzerland)	2–0	(England) Crystal Palace	Biel/Bienne, Switzerland
15:00 CEST (UTC+2)	Ngamaleu 5'; Hoarau 32'	Report		Stadium: Tissot Arena; Attendance: 4'836

8 January 2020 Friendly	Young Boys (Switzerland)	1–2	(Germany) Hansa Rostock	Serik, Turkey
14:00 CET (UTC+1)	Fassnacht 65'	Report	5' Breier; 24' Butzen	Stadium: Regnum Carya Golf Resort

11 January 2020 Friendly	Young Boys (Switzerland)	1–3	(Turkey) İstanbul Başakşehir	Serik, Turkey
15:00 CET (UTC+1)	Ngamaleu 90' (pen.)	Report	5', 14' Ba; 70' Višća	Stadium: Maxx Royal Resort

14 January 2020 Friendly	Young Boys (Switzerland)	1–0	(Romania) Viitorul Constanța	Serik, Turkey
14:00 CET (UTC+1)	Assalé 40'	Report		Stadium: Regnum Carys Golf Resort

18 January 2020 Friendly	Young Boys (Switzerland)	2–2	(Switzerland) Schaffhausen	Bern, Switzerland
13:00 CET (UTC+1)	Nsame 62' (pen.) 80'	Report	87' Del Toro; 90+1' (o.g.) Lustenberger	Stadium: Stade de Suisse; Attendance: 650

18 January 2020 Friendly	Young Boys (Switzerland)	2–1	(Switzerland) Chiasso	Bern, Switzerland
16:00 CET (UTC+1)	Hoarau 11'; Sierro 49'	Report	83' Kryeziu	Stadium: Stade de Suisse; Attendance: 950

6 March 2020 Friendly	Young Boys (Switzerland)	5–1	(Switzerland) Kriens	Bern, Switzerland
15:30 CET (UTC+1)	Hoarau 17'; Fassnacht 29', 72'; Nsame 50'; Mambimbi 72'	Report	87' Ulrich	Stadium: Stade de Suisse; Attendance: 0

13 March 2020 Friendly	Young Boys (Switzerland)	0–0	(Switzerland) Winterthur	Bern, Switzerland
15:00 CET (UTC+1)		Report		Stadium: Stade de Suisse; Attendance: 0

6 June 2020 Friendly	Young Boys (Switzerland)	2–0	(Switzerland) Lausanne-Sport	Bern, Switzerland
13:00 CEST (UTC+2)	Nsame 68'; Fassnacht 113'	Report		Stadium: Stade de Suisse; Attendance: 0

12 June 2020 Friendly	Young Boys (Switzerland)	4–2	(Switzerland) Winterthur	Bern, Switzerland
15:30 CEST (UTC+2)	Nsame 37'; Aebischer 52'; Mambimbi 96'; Hoarau 98'	Report	5' Arnold; 46' Mahamid	Stadium: Stade de Suisse; Attendance: 0

== Competitions ==
=== Overview ===
Competition	First match	Last match	Starting round	Final position	Record							
Competition	First match	Last match	Starting round	Final position	Pld	W	D	L	GF	GA	GD	Win %
Swiss Super League	19 July 2019	3 August 2019	Matchday 1	Winners	36	23	7	6	80	41	+39	63.89
Swiss Cup	16 August 2019	30 August 2020	Round 1	Winners	6	6	0	0	23	5	+18	100.00
UEFA Champions League	21 August 2019	27 August 2019	Play-off round	Play-off round	2	0	2	0	3	3	+0	0.00
UEFA Europa League	19 September 2019	12 December 2019	Group stage	Group stage	6	2	2	2	8	7	+1	33.33
Total					50	31	11	8	114	56	+58	62.00

Last updated: 30 August 2020
Source: Soccerway

=== Swiss Super League ===
==== League table ====
Pos	Team	Pld	W	D	L	GF	GA	GD	Pts	Qualification or relegation
1	Young Boys (C)	36	23	7	6	80	41	+39	76	Qualificaition for Champions League second qualifying round
2	St. Gallen	36	21	5	10	79	56	+23	68	Qualificaition for Europa League third qualifying round
3	Basel	36	18	8	10	74	38	+36	62	Qualificaition for Europa League second qualifying round
4	Servette	36	12	13	11	57	48	+9	49	Qualificaition for Europa League first qualifying round
5	Lugano	36	11	14	11	46	46	0	47	

Source: Swiss Super League
Rules for classification: 1) Points; 2) Goal difference; 3) Goals scored; 4) Head-to-head goal difference; 5) Away goals scored; 6) Draw.
(C) Champions

==== Results summary ====
Overall								Home						Away					
Pld	W	D	L	GF	GA	GD	Pts	W	D	L	GF	GA	GD	W	D	L	GF	GA	GD
36	23	7	6	80	41	+39	76	16	2	0	51	15	+36	7	5	6	29	26	+3

Last updated: 3 August 2020.

==== Results by round ====
Round	1	2	3	4	5
Ground	H	A	H	A	H
Result	D	W	W	W	W
Position					

Updated to match(es) played on 3 August 2020. Source:
A = Away; H = Home; W = Win; D = Draw; L = Loss

==== Matches ====
21 July 2019 1	Young Boys	1–1	Servette	Bern
16:00 CEST (UTC+2)				Stadium: Stade de Suisse

28 July 2019 2	Neuchâtel Xamax	0–1	Young Boys	Neuchâtel
16:00 CEST (UTC+2)				Stadium: Stade de la Maladière

4 August 2019 3	Young Boys	2–0	Lugano	Bern
16:00 CEST (UTC+2)				Stadium: Stade de Suisse

10 August 2019 4	St. Gallen	2–3	Young Boys	St. Gallen
19:00 CET (UTC+1)				Stadium: Kybunpark

24 August 2019 5	Young Boys	4–0	Zürich	Bern
19:00 CEST (UTC+2)				Stadium: Stade de Suisse

22 September 2019 7	Young Boys	1–1	Basel	Bern
16:00 CEST (UTC+2)	Sørensen (yellow card) 24'; Assalé (yellow card) 26'; Nsame 59'; Lustenberger (yellow card) 85'	FCB report	Widmer 5'; Cabral (yellow card) 63'	Stadium: Stade de Suisse; Attendance: 31,120; Referee: Sandro Schärer

1 December 2019 16	Basel	3–0	Young Boys	Basel
16:00 CET (UTC+1)	Cabral 6'; Alderete 13'; Zhegrova (yellow card) 45+3'; Zhegrova 48'; Frei (yellow card) 83'	FCB report	Garcia (yellow card) 54'; Janko (yellow card) 73'	Stadium: St. Jakob-Park; Attendance: 30,965; Referee: Stephan Klossner

26 January 2020 19	Young Boys	2–0	Basel	Bern
16:00 CET (UTC+1)	Aebischer (yellow card) 37'; Nsame 39'; Hoarau 78'	FCB report	Ademi (yellow card) 13'; Petretta (yellow card) 58'; Bergström (yellow card) 77'; Alderete (yellow card) 87' (yellow-red card) 90'	Stadium: Stade de Suisse; Attendance: 31,120; Referee: Sandro Schärer

16 February 2020 22	Lugano	2–1	Young Boys	Lugano
16:00 CET (UTC+1)				Stadium: Cornaredo Stadium

23 February 2020 23	St. Gallen	3–3	Young Boys	St. Gallen
16:00 CET (UTC+1)				Stadium: Kybunpark

19 June 2020 24	Young Boys	3–2	Zürich	Bern
20:30 CEST (UTC+2)				Stadium: Stade de Suisse

23 June 2020 25	Thun	1–0	Young Boys	Thun
20:30 CEST (UTC+2)				Stadium: Stockhorn Arena

27 June 2020 26	Young Boys	6–0	Neuchâtel Xamax	Bern
20:30 CEST (UTC+2)				Stadium: Stade de Suisse

30 June 2020 27	Servette	1–1	Young Boys	Geneva
20:30 CEST (UTC+2)				Stadium: Stade de Genève

5 July 2020 28	Young Boys	3–0	Lugano	Bern
16:00 CEST (UTC+2)				Stadium: Stade de Suisse

8 July 2020 29	Young Boys	4–0	Thun	Bern
18:15 CEST (UTC+2)				Stadium: Stade de Suisse

11 July 2020 30	Basel	3–2	Young Boys	Basel
20:30 CEST (UTC+2)	Campo 13'; Pululu (yellow card) 23'; Arthur 48', 61'; Cömert (yellow card) 55'; Widmer (yellow card) 76'; Omlin (yellow card) 90+4'	FCB report	Janko (yellow card) 32'; Aebischer (yellow card) 50' (yellow-red card) 81'; Lotomba (yellow card) 51'; Nsame 66'; Fassnacht 70'	Stadium: St. Jakob-Park; Attendance: 1,000; Referee: Sandro Schärer

15 July 2020 31	Young Boys	4–2	Servette	Bern
20:30 CEST (UTC+2)				Stadium: Stade de Suisse

18 July 2020 32	Zürich	0–5	Young Boys	Zürich
20:30 CEST (UTC+2)				Stadium: Letzigrund

23 July 2020 33	Neuchâtel Xamax	0–1	Young Boys	Neuchâtel
20:30 CEST (UTC+2)				Stadium: Stade de la Maladière

26 July 2020 34	Young Boys	1–0	Luzern	Bern
16:00 CEST (UTC+2)				Stadium: Stade de Suisse

31 July 2020 35	Sion	0–1	Young Boys	Sion
20:30 CEST (UTC+2)				Stadium: Stade Tourbillon

3 August 2020 36	Young Boys	3–1	St. Gallen	Bern
20:30 CEST (UTC+2)				Stadium: Stade de Suisse

=== Swiss Cup ===
16 August 2019 First round	Étoile Carouge FC	0–1	Young Boys	Carouge
18:30 CEST (UTC+2)				Stadium: Stade de la Fontenette

14 September 2019 Second round	FC Freienbach	2–11	Young Boys	Freienbach
18:30 CEST (UTC+2)				Stadium: Chrummen

30 October 2019 Third round	Zürich	0–4	Young Boys	Zürich
18:30 CEST (UTC+2)				Stadium: Letzigrund

6 August 2020 Quarter-finals	FC Luzern	1–2 (a.e.t.)	Young Boys	Lucerne
18:30 CEST (UTC+2)				Stadium: Swissporarena

9 August 2020 Semi-finals	Young Boys	3–1	Sion	Bern
17:30 CEST (UTC+2)				Stadium: Stade de Suisse

30 August 2020 Final	Basel	1–2	Young Boys	Bern
17:30 CEST (UTC+2)	Widmer (yellow card) 12'; Alderete 42'; Marchand (yellow card) 62'; Ademi (yellow card) 68'; Van der Werff (yellow card) 74'		Martins (yellow card) 5'; Nsame 50'; Garcia (yellow card) 69'; Ngamaleu (yellow card) 74'; Spielmann 89'	Stadium: Stade de Suisse; Attendance: 1,000; Referee: Sandro Schärer

=== UEFA Champions League ===
==== Play-off round ====
21 August 2019 First leg	Young Boys (Switzerland)	2–2	(Serbia) Red Star Belgrade	Bern, Switzerland
21:00 CEST (UTC+2)	Assalé 7'; Hoarau 76' (pen.)	Report	Degenek 18'; García 46'	Stadium: Stade de Suisse; Attendance: 26,375; Referee: Danny Makkelie (Netherlands)

27 August 2019 Second leg	Red Star Belgrade (Serbia)	1–1 (3–3 (a) agg.)	(Switzerland) Young Boys	Belgrade, Serbia
21:00 CEST (UTC+2)	Vukanović 59'	Report	Ben 82' (o.g.)	Stadium: Red Star Stadium; Attendance: 47,487; Referee: Anthony Taylor (England)

=== UEFA Europa League ===
==== Group stage ====
Pos	Team	Pld	W	D	L	GF	GA	GD	Pts	Qualification	POR	RAN	YB	FEY
1	(Portugal) Porto	6	3	1	2	8	9	−1	10	Advance to knockout phase	—	1–1	2–1	3–2
2	(Scotland) Rangers	6	2	3	1	8	6	+2	9	Advance to knockout phase	2–0	—	1–1	1–0
3	(Switzerland) Young Boys	6	2	2	2	8	7	+1	8		1–2	2–1	—	2–0
4	(Netherlands) Feyenoord	6	1	2	3	7	9	−2	5		2–0	2–2	1–1	—

Source: UEFA
Rules for classification: Group stage tiebreakers

19 September 2019 1	Porto (Portugal)	2–1	(Switzerland) Young Boys	Porto, Portugal
20:00 WEST (UTC+1)				Stadium: Estádio do Dragão

3 October 2019 2	Young Boys (Switzerland)	2–1	(Scotland) Rangers	Bern, Switzerland
18:55 CEST (UTC+2)				Stadium: Stade de Suisse

24 October 2019 3	Young Boys (Switzerland)	2–0	(Netherlands) Feyenoord	Bern, Switzerland
18:55 CEST (UTC+2)				Stadium: Stade de Suisse

7 November 2019 4	Feyenoord (Netherlands)	1–1	(Switzerland) Young Boys	Rotterdam, Netherlands
21:00 CET (UTC+1)				Stadium: De Kuip

28 November 2019 5	Young Boys (Switzerland)	1–2	(Portugal) Porto	Bern, Switzerland
18:55 CET (UTC+1)				Stadium: Stade de Suisse

12 December 2019 6	Rangers (Scotland)	1–1	(Switzerland) Young Boys	Glasgow, Scotland
20:00 GMT (UTC±0)				Stadium: Ibrox Stadium
