= List of Swiss football transfers winter 2022–23 =

This is a list of Swiss football transfers for the 2022–23 winter transfer window. Only transfers featuring Swiss Super League are listed.

== Swiss Super League ==
Note: Flags indicate national team as has been defined under FIFA eligibility rules. Players may hold more than one non-FIFA nationality.

=== Zürich ===
In:

No.	Pos.	Nation	Player
12	MF	NGA	Ifeanyi Mathew (from (Norway) Lillestrøm)
22	FW	CRO	Roko Šimić (on loan from (Austria) Red Bull Salzburg)
39	FW	GHA	Daniel Afriyie (from (Ghana) Hearts of Oak)

Out:

No.	Pos.	Nation	Player
18	FW	KOS	Donis Avdijaj (on loan to (Austria) Hartberg)
28	DF	EST	Karol Mets (on loan to (Germany) FC St. Pauli)
—	FW	SUI	Henri Koide (to (Belgium) Beerschot, previously on loan at Neuchâtel Xamax)
—	FW	UKR	Bohdan Vyunnyk (loan return to (Ukraine) Shakhtar Donetsk)

=== Basel ===
In:

No.	Pos.	Nation	Player
25	FW	ESP	Hugo Novoa (on loan from (Germany) RB Leipzig)

Out:

No.	Pos.	Nation	Player
11	FW	HUN	Ádám Szalai (free agent)
24	FW	SUI	Tician Tushi (on loan to Neuchâtel Xamax)
38	MF	SUI	Yannick Marchand (to Grasshoppers youth)
42	MF	TUN	Sayfallah Ltaief (on loan to Winterthur)

=== Young Boys ===
In:

No.	Pos.	Nation	Player
33	GK	SUI	Marvin Keller (from Wil)
—	MF	SWE	Noah Persson (from (Sweden) Mjällby)

Out:

No.	Pos.	Nation	Player
6	MF	SUI	Esteban Petignat (free agent)
8	MF	SUI	Vincent Sierro (to (France) Toulouse)
—	MF	SWE	Noah Persson (on loan to (Sweden) Mjällby)

=== Lugano ===
In:

No.	Pos.	Nation	Player
6	DF	ECU	Jhon Espinoza (from (United States) Chicago Fire)

Out:

No.	Pos.	Nation	Player
3	DF	SUI	Reto Ziegler (to Sion)
8	MF	SUI	Adrian Durrer (on loan to Bellinzona)
11	MF	SUI	Maren Haile-Selassie (on loan to (United States) Chicago Fire)

=== St. Gallen ===
In:

No.	Pos.	Nation	Player
69	FW	FRA	Willem Geubbels (from (France) Monaco)
77	FW	GER	Leon Dajaku (on loan from (England) Sunderland)

Out:

No.	Pos.	Nation	Player
19	DF	MLI	Daouda Guindo (loan return to (Austria) Red Bull Salzburg)

=== Servette ===
In:

No.	Pos.	Nation	Player
43	DF	SUI	Kevin Mbabu (on loan from (England) Fulham)

Out:

No.	Pos.	Nation	Player
22	DF	SUI	Valton Behrami (on loan to Bellinzona)
35	DF	POR	Diogo Monteiro (to (England) Leeds United)
41	FW	SUI	Alexandre Patrício (on loan to (Italy) Hellas Verona youth)

=== Sion ===
In:

No.	Pos.	Nation	Player
3	DF	SUI	Reto Ziegler (from Lugano)

Out:

No.	Pos.	Nation	Player
17	FW	SUI	Filip Stojilković (to (Germany) Darmstadt 98)
—	MF	BRA	Adryan (to (Italy) Brescia)

=== Grasshoppers ===
In:

No.	Pos.	Nation	Player
34	DF	JPN	Teruki Hara (on loan from (Japan) Shimizu S-Pulse)

Out:

No.	Pos.	Nation	Player
4	DF	CHN	Li Lei (to (China) Beijing Guoan)
29	GK	AUT	Manuel Kuttin (free agent)
50	MF	SUI	Simone Stroscio (on loan to Schaffhausen)

=== Luzern ===
In:

No.	Pos.	Nation	Player
15	MF	MLI	Mamady Diambou (on loan from (Austria) Red Bull Salzburg)
77	FW	SWE	Benjamin Kimpioka (on loan from (Sweden) AIK)

Out:

No.	Pos.	Nation	Player
4	DF	GER	Christian Gentner (retired)
19	FW	URU	Joaquín Ardaiz (on loan to Winterthur)
—	FW	SUI	Lino Lang (on loan to Étoile Carouge)

=== Winterthur ===
In:

No.	Pos.	Nation	Player
11	FW	URU	Joaquín Ardaiz (on loan from Luzern)
24	MF	TUN	Sayfallah Ltaief (on loan from Basel)
30	GK	AUT	Markus Kuster (free agent)

Out:

No.	Pos.	Nation	Player
22	FW	ALB	Florian Kamberi (to (England) Huddersfield Town)
33	MF	SUI	Stephan Seiler (loan return to Zürich)
34	DF	SUI	Pascal Hammer (on loan to Biel-Bienne)
35	MF	SUI	Arlind Dakaj (to (Bulgaria) Cherno More)
—	DF	SUI	Marin Cavar (to Brühl, previously on loan)

== See also ==
- 2022–23 Swiss Super League
