= Sandro Lauper =

Swiss footballer (born 1996)

Personal information
- Full name: Sandro Mike Lauper
- Date of birth: 25 October 1996 (age 30)
- Place of birth: Oberdiessbach, Switzerland
- Height: 1.85 m (6 ft 1 in)
- Position: Midfielder

Team information
- Current team: Young Boys
- Number: 30

Senior career*
Years	Team	Apps	(Gls)
2016–2018	Thun	65	(4)
2018–	Young Boys	194	(9)

International career^{‡}
2017	Switzerland U20	2	(0)
2016–2018	Switzerland U21	7	(0)
- * Club domestic league appearances and goals as of 18:35, 19 September 2026 (UTC) ‡ National team caps and goals as of 05:07, 5 June 2023 (UTC)

Sandro Mike Lauper (born 25 October 1996) is a Swiss professional footballer who plays as a midfielder for Swiss Super League club Young Boys.

== Career ==
On 1 July 2018, Lauper joined Young Boys on a four-year contract.

== Career statistics ==
=== Club ===
As of match played 19 September 2026

Appearances and goals by club, season and competition
Club	Season	League			Swiss Cup		Europe		Total	
Club	Season	Division	Apps	Goals	Apps	Goals	Apps	Goals	Apps	Goals
Thun	2015–16	Swiss Super League	6	0	2	0	—		8	0
Thun	2016–17	Swiss Super League	26	1	1	0	—		27	1
Thun	2017–18	Swiss Super League	33	3	4	0	—		37	3
Thun	Total		65	4	7	0	—		72	4
Young Boys	2018–19	Swiss Super League	28	1	2	0	5 (Note: Appearances in UEFA Champions League)	0	35	1
Young Boys	2019–20	Swiss Super League	0	0	0	0	0	0	0	0
Young Boys	2020–21	Swiss Super League	20	4	1	0	4 (Note: Appearances in UEFA Europa League)	0	25	4
Young Boys	2021–22	Swiss Super League	27	0	1	0	3	0	31	0
Young Boys	2022–23	Swiss Super League	20	2	4	1	0	0	24	3
Young Boys	2023–24	Swiss Super League	29	1	2	0	8 (Note: Six appearances in UEFA Champions League, two appearances in UEFA Europa League)	0	39	1
Young Boys	2024–25	Swiss Super League	28	0	5	1	9	0	42	1
Young Boys	2025-26	Swiss Super League	33	1	1	0	9	1	43	2
Young Boys	2026–27	Swiss Super League	9	0	1	0	—		10	0
Young Boys	Total		194	9	18	2	38	1	249	12
Career total			259	13	24	2	38	1	321	16

== Honours ==
Young Boys

- Swiss Super League: 2018–19, 2019–20, 2020–21, 2022–23
- Swiss Cup: 2019–20, 2022–23
