= Joschua Neuenschwander =

Swiss footballer (born 2000)

Personal information
- Date of birth: 28 June 2000 (age 26)
- Place of birth: Riggisberg, Switzerland
- Height: 1.82 m (6 ft 0 in)
- Position: Goalkeeper

Youth career
- 2008–2011: FC Sternenberg
- 2011–2019: BSC Young Boys

Senior career*
Years	Team	Apps	(Gls)
2019–2021	BSC Young Boys	1	(0)
2019–2020	→ Köniz (loan)	17	(0)
2021–2022	Kriens	20	(0)
2022–2023	Aarau	0	(0)

International career^{‡}
2014–2015	Switzerland U15	4	(0)
2016	Switzerland U16	2	(0)
2016–2017	Switzerland U17	4	(0)
2017–2018	Switzerland U18	3	(0)
2018–2019	Switzerland U19	7	(0)
- * Club domestic league appearances and goals as of 27 May 2023 ‡ National team caps and goals as of 21 May 2021

Joschua Neuenschwander (born 28 June 2000) is a Swiss professional football player.

== Club career ==
Joschua Neuenschwander made his professional debut for BSC Young Boys on the 21 May 2021, replacing Guillaume Faivre during the 4-2 away Super League win against FC Lausanne-Sport. By not letting Lausanne score any other goal after he came in at the 66th minute, he allowed his team to beat the Swiss league record for the fewest goals conceded in a season (only 29), previously held by FC Basel (who had 31 goal against in 2012–13).

On 14 July 2022, Neuenschwander signed with Aarau.
