= Fabian Lustenberger =

Swiss footballer (born 1988)

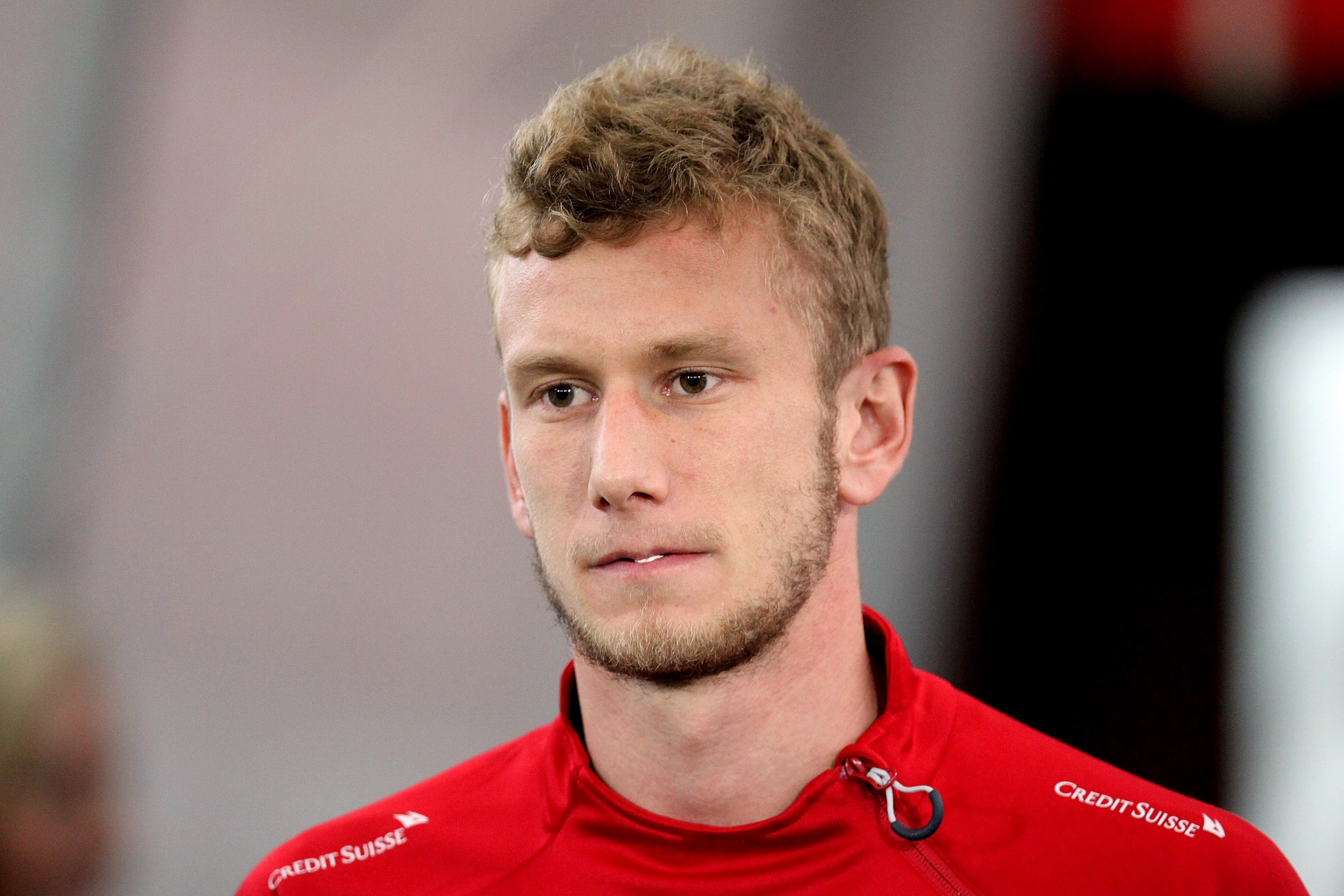
- Lustenberger in 2015

Personal information
- Full name: Fabian Lustenberger
- Date of birth: 2 May 1988 (age 38)
- Place of birth: Nebikon, Switzerland
- Height: 1.80 m (5 ft 11 in)
- Position: Defensive midfielder

Youth career
- 1995–2000: SC Nebikon
- 2000–2005: FC Luzern

Senior career*
Years	Team	Apps	(Gls)
2005–2007	Luzern	34	(0)
2007–2019	Hertha BSC	271	(4)
2007–2014	Hertha BSC II	21	(2)
2019–2024	Young Boys	116	(2)

International career
2007–2011	Switzerland U-21	25	(2)
2013–2015	Switzerland	3	(0)
- * Club domestic league appearances and goals

Fabian Lustenberger (born 2 May 1988) is a Swiss former professional footballer. He has earned three caps with the Switzerland national team.

== Career ==
Since 2013, Lustenberger has been the captain of the Berlin side, after helping Hertha BSC return to the Bundesliga after a season in 2. Bundesliga. On 9 March 2016, he extended his contract until 2019. However, Vedad Ibišević became the new captain of Hertha BSC in August 2016, due to choice of Pál Dárdai.

=== Young Boys ===
On 28 January 2019, BSC Young Boys announced that Lustenberger would join the club from the upcoming 2019/20 season. He penned a three-year deal.

== Career statistics ==
=== Club ===
As of match played on 26 May 2024

Appearances and goals by club, season and competition
Club	Season	League			Cup		Continental		Total	
Club	Season	Division	Apps	Goals	Apps	Goals	Apps	Goals	Apps	Goals
FC Luzern	2005-06	Swiss Challenge League	1	0	0	0	—		1	0
FC Luzern	2006–07	Swiss Super League	30	0	6	3	—		36	3
FC Luzern	2007–08	Swiss Super League	3	0	0	0	—		3	0
FC Luzern	Total		34	0	6	3	—		40	3
Hertha BSC	2007–08	Bundesliga	24	1	0	0	—		24	1
Hertha BSC	2008–09	Bundesliga	14	1	2	1	9 (Note: Appearance(s) in UEFA Europa League)	0	25	2
Hertha BSC	2009–10	Bundesliga	23	0	0	0	4	0	27	0
Hertha BSC	2010–11	2. Bundesliga	18	1	0	0	—		18	1
Hertha BSC	2011–12	Bundesliga	12	0	3	0	—		15	0
Hertha BSC	2012–13	2. Bundesliga	33	0	1	0	—		34	0
Hertha BSC	2013–14	Bundesliga	19	0	2	0	—		21	0
Hertha BSC	2014–15	Bundesliga	27	0	1	0	—		28	0
Hertha BSC	2015–16	Bundesliga	30	1	4	0	—		34	1
Hertha BSC	2016–17	Bundesliga	19	0	1	0	2	0	22	0
Hertha BSC	2017–18	Bundesliga	23	0	1	0	5	0	29	0
Hertha BSC	2018–19	Bundesliga	29	0	1	0	—		30	0
Hertha BSC	Total		271	4	16	1	20	0	307	5
Hertha BSC II	2007–08	NOFV-Oberliga Nord	2	0	—		—		2	0
Hertha BSC II	2008–09	Regionalliga Nord	6	0	—		—		6	0
Hertha BSC II	2009–10	Regionalliga Nord	3	1	—		—		3	1
Hertha BSC II	2010–11	Regionalliga Nord	4	0	—		—		4	0
Hertha BSC II	2011–12	Regionalliga Nord	4	1	—		—		4	1
Hertha BSC II	2014–15	Regionalliga Nordost	2	1	—		—		2	1
Hertha BSC II	Total		21	3	—		—		21	2
Young Boys	2019–20	Swiss Super League	30	0	3	1	7 (Note: Two appearances in UEFA Champions League, five appearances in UEFA Europa League)	0	40	1
Young Boys	2020–21	Swiss Super League	21	0	1	0	11 (Note: Two appearances in UEFA Champions League, nine appearances in UEFA Europa League)	0	33	0
Young Boys	2021–22	Swiss Super League	21	0	0	0	1 (Note: Appearance(s) in UEFA Champions League)	0	22	0
Young Boys	2022–23	Swiss Super League	26	0	4	0	4 (Note: Appearance(s) in UEFA Europa Conference League)	0	30	0
Young Boys	2023–24	Swiss Super League	18	2	3	0	2 (Note: One appearance in UEFA Champions League, one appearance in UEFA Europa League)	0	23	2
Young Boys	Total		116	2	11	1	25	0	152	3
Career total			442	9	33	5	45	0	520	14

=== International ===
As of match played on 26 February 2021

Appearances and goals by national team and year
National team	Year	Apps	Goals
Switzerland	2013	1	0
Switzerland	2013	2	0
Total		3	0

== Honours ==
Hertha BSC

- 2. Bundesliga: 2010–11, 2012–13

Young Boys

- Swiss Super League: 2019–20, 2020–21, 2022–23
- Swiss Cup: 2019–20, 2022–23

=== Individual ===
- Swiss Super League Team of the Year: 2020–21
