= Christopher Martins =

Luxembourgish footballer

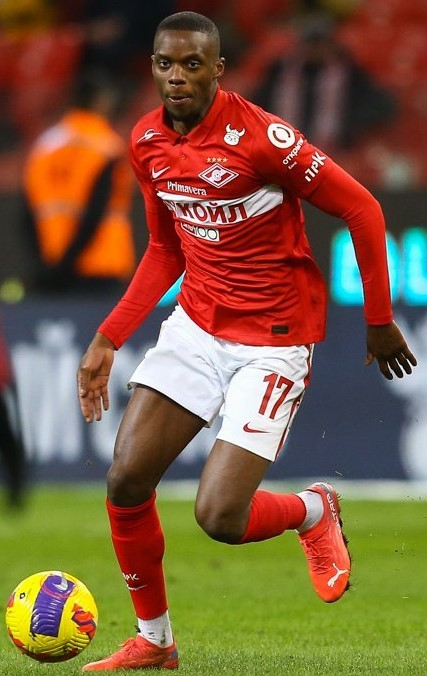
- Martins with Spartak Moscow in 2022

Personal information
- Full name: Christopher Martins Pereira
- Date of birth: 19 February 1997 (age 29)
- Place of birth: Luxembourg City, Luxembourg
- Height: 1.87 m (6 ft 2 in)
- Position: Midfielder

Team information
- Current team: Spartak Moscow
- Number: 35

Youth career
- Racing FC

Senior career*
Years	Team	Apps	(Gls)
2012–2013	Racing FC	8	(0)
2013–2019	Lyon B	45	(2)
2017–2019	Lyon	2	(0)
2017–2018	→ Bourg-Péronnas (loan)	17	(1)
2018–2019	→ Troyes (loan)	30	(2)
2019–2022	Young Boys	48	(4)
2022	→ Spartak Moscow (loan)	10	(1)
2022–	Spartak Moscow	98	(14)

International career^{‡}
2012	Luxembourg U17	6	(0)
2012	Luxembourg U19	3	(1)
2014	Luxembourg U21	2	(0)
2014–	Luxembourg	83	(1)
- * Club domestic league appearances and goals as of 22 November 2026 ‡ National team caps and goals as of 6 June 2026

Christopher Martins Pereira (born 19 February 1997) is a Luxembourgish professional footballer who plays as a defensive midfielder or central midfielder for Russian Premier League club Spartak Moscow and the Luxembourg national team.

== Club career ==
Martins is a youth exponent from Racing FC in Luxembourg City. He transferred to the Lyon Academy in 2013.

Martins made his Lyon debut on 10 September 2017 in a Ligue 1 match against Guingamp. He started the match and was replaced by Jordan Ferri after 51 minutes in a 2–1 home win.

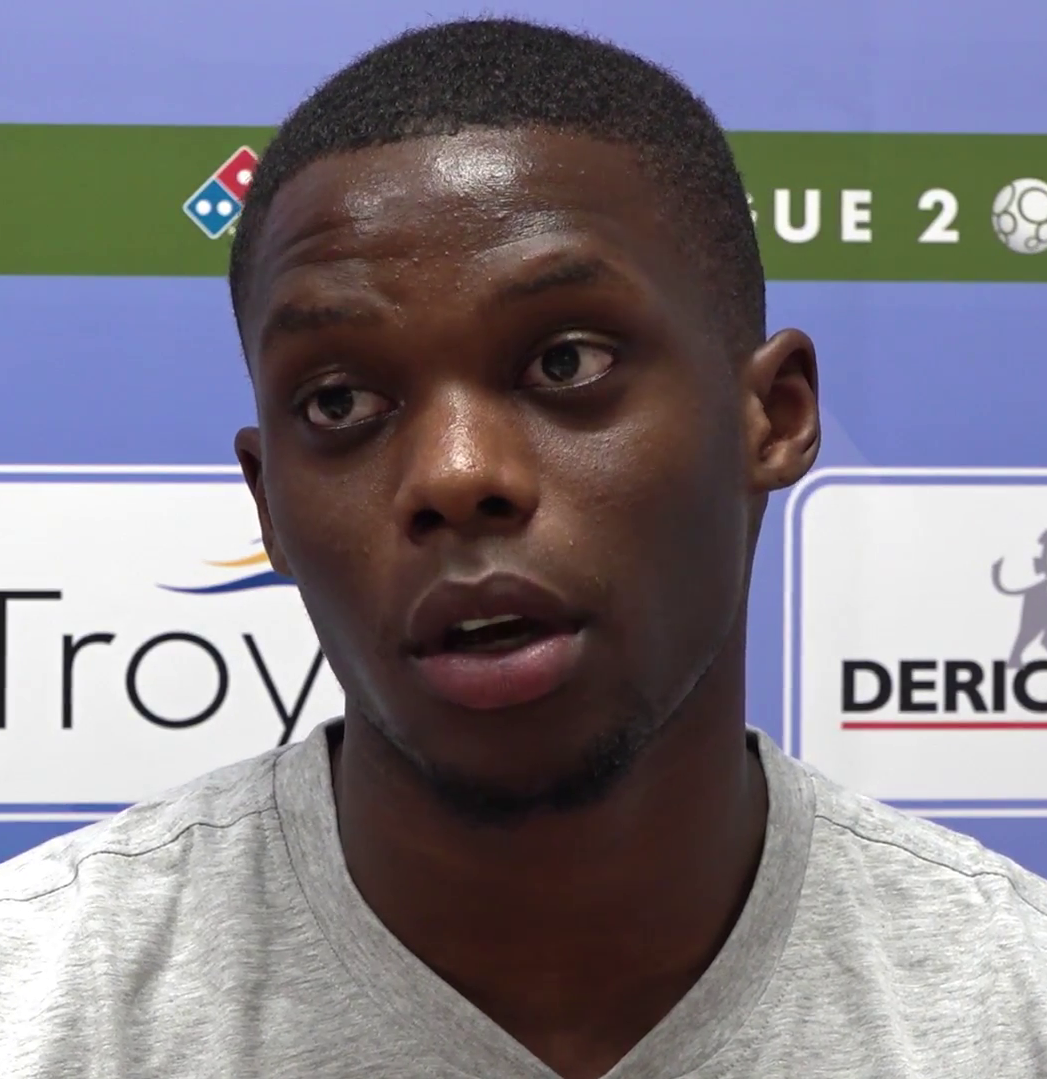
Martins in 2018.

In June 2019 he signed for Swiss club Young Boys. He won both the 2019-20 and 2020-21 Swiss Super Leagues with the club.

On 31 January 2022, he joined Russian giants Spartak Moscow on a short-term loan. In their announcement of the transfer, Young Boys said that Spartak was expected to buy him out at the conclusion of the loan. Martins won the Russian Cup on 29 May 2022, with him starting in the 2-1 final victory against Dynamo Moscow in what is known as the Oldest Russian derby. On 3 June 2022, Spartak confirmed Martins' permanent transfer, and his signing until 2026. On 14 July 2025, Martins's contract with Spartak was extended to June 2028.

== International career ==
Martins represented Luxembourg at youth international levels, playing for them in the under-17, under-19, and under-21 age groups.

He was eligible to represent either Luxembourg, France, or Cape Verde at international level; he rejected a call-up from Luxembourg's senior team in March 2013 as he had not decided which nation he wished to represent. After being called up again by Luxembourg, he made his debut on 8 September 2014, at the age of 17.

== Career statistics ==
=== Club ===
As of match played 22 November 2026

Appearances and goals by club, season and competition
Club	Season	League			National cup		Continental		Other		Total	
Club	Season	Division	Apps	Goals	Apps	Goals	Apps	Goals	Apps	Goals	Apps	Goals
Racing-Union	2012–13	Luxembourg National Division	8	0	—		—		—		8	0
Lyon B	2013–14	CFA 2	1	0	—		—		—		1	0
Lyon B	2014–15	CFA 2	14	2	—		—		—		14	2
Lyon B	2015–16	CFA 2	10	0	—		—		—		10	0
Lyon B	2016–17	CFA 2	18	0	—		—		—		18	0
Lyon B	2017–18	CFA 2	1	0	—		—		—		1	0
Lyon B	2018–19	CFA 2	1	0	—		—		—		1	0
Lyon B	Total		45	2	—		—		—		45	2
Lyon	2017–18	Ligue 1	2	0	—		0	0	—		2	0
FBBP01 (loan)	2017–18	Ligue 2	17	1	3	1	—		2 (Note: Appearances in Ligue 2 relegation play-offs)	0	22	2
Troyes (loan)	2018–19	Ligue 2	30	2	1	0	—		—		31	2
Young Boys	2019–20	Swiss Super League	22	2	3	1	3 (Note: One appearance in UEFA Champions League, two appearances in UEFA Europa League)	0	—		28	3
Young Boys	2020–21	Swiss Super League	11	2	0	0	3 (Note: Two appearances in UEFA Champions League, one appearance in UEFA Europa League)	0	—		14	2
Young Boys	2021–22	Swiss Super League	15	0	1	0	10 (Note: Appearances in UEFA Champions League)	0	—		26	0
Young Boys	Total		48	4	4	1	16	0	–		68	5
Young Boys U21	2019–20	1. Liga	1	0	—		—		—		1	0
Spartak Moscow (loan)	2021–22	Russian Premier League	10	1	4	0	—		—		14	1
Spartak Moscow	2022–23	Russian Premier League	18	2	5	1	—		—		23	3
Spartak Moscow	2023–24	Russian Premier League	26	4	11	1	—		—		37	5
Spartak Moscow	2024–25	Russian Premier League	23	3	10	6	—		—		33	9
Spartak Moscow	2025–26	Russian Premier League	27	4	9	1	—		—		36	5
Spartak Moscow	2026–27	Russian Premier League	4	1	1	0	—		1 (Note: Appearance in Russian Super Cup)	1	6	2
Spartak Moscow	Total		98	14	36	9	0	0	1	1	135	24
Career total			259	25	48	11	16	0	3	1	326	36

=== International ===
As of match played 6 June 2026

Appearances and goals by national team and year
National team	Year	Apps	Goals
Luxembourg	2014	4	0
Luxembourg	2015	6	0
Luxembourg	2016	7	0
Luxembourg	2017	8	0
Luxembourg	2018	8	1
Luxembourg	2019	5	0
Luxembourg	2020	2	0
Luxembourg	2021	9	0
Luxembourg	2022	6	0
Luxembourg	2023	9	0
Luxembourg	2024	9	0
Luxembourg	2025	6	0
Luxembourg	2026	4	0
Total		83	1

Scores and results list Luxembourg's goal tally first, score column indicates score after each Martins goal.

List of international goals scored by Christopher Martins
No.	Date	Venue	Opponent	Score	Result	Competition
1	8 September 2018	Stade Josy Barthel, Luxembourg City, Luxembourg	Moldova	4–0	4–0	2018–19 UEFA Nations League D

== Honours ==
Young Boys

- Swiss Super League: 2019–20
- Swiss Cup: 2019–20

Spartak Moscow

- Russian Cup: 2021–22, 2025–26
