= Michel Aebischer =

Swiss footballer (born 1997)

Personal information
- Full name: Michel Aebischer
- Date of birth: 6 January 1997 (age 29)
- Place of birth: Fribourg, Switzerland
- Height: 1.83 m (6 ft 0 in)
- Position: Defensive midfielder

Team information
- Current team: Union Berlin
- Number: 20

Youth career
- –2016: Young Boys

Senior career*
Years	Team	Apps	(Gls)
2016–2022	Young Boys	133	(12)
2022	→ Bologna (loan)	12	(0)
2022–2026	Bologna	82	(1)
2025–2026	→ Pisa (loan)	35	(1)
2026	Pisa	0	(0)
2026–	Union Berlin	8	(0)

International career^{‡}
2012	Switzerland U16	1	(0)
2017–2018	Switzerland U20	8	(0)
2018	Switzerland U21	6	(0)
2019–	Switzerland	48	(2)
- * Club domestic league appearances and goals as of 1 November 2026 ‡ National team caps and goals as of 13 November 2026

Michel Aebischer (born 6 January 1997) is a Swiss professional footballer who plays as a defensive midfielder for Bundesliga club Union Berlin and the Switzerland national team.

== Club career ==
Aebischer is a youth exponent from Young Boys. He made his Swiss Super League debut on 10 September 2016 against Luzern.

He was part of the Young Boys squad that won the 2017–18 Swiss Super League, their first league title for 32 years.

On 25 January 2022, he joined Bologna in Italy. The transfer was initially a loan with a future obligation to buy the rights permanently.

On 3 August 2025, Aebischer was loaned by Pisa, with a conditional obligation to buy.

On 19 August 2026, Aebischer signed for Union Berlin in the Bundesliga.

== International career ==
Aebischer made his debut for Switzerland national team on 18 November 2019 in a Euro 2020 qualifier against Gibraltar. He came on as a substitute for Ruben Vargas in the 85th minute. On 9 November 2022, he was called up for the Swiss squad for the 2022 FIFA World Cup in Qatar, where he made one appearance as a 76th-minute substitute for Djibril Sow in the 1–0 Group G loss to Brazil.

On 7 June 2024, Aebischer was named in the 26-man squad for the UEFA Euro 2024. On 15 June, he scored his first international goal and provided an assist in a 3–1 victory over Hungary in Switzerland's opening match of the tournament.

On 20 May 2026, Aebischer was selected in the 26-man squad for the 2026 FIFA World Cup.

== Career statistics ==
=== Club ===
As of match played 1 November 2026

Appearances and goals by club, season and competition
Club	Season	League			National cup		Europe		Total	
Club	Season	Division	Apps	Goals	Apps	Goals	Apps	Goals	Apps	Goals
Young Boys	2016–17	Swiss Super League	14	1	1	0	2 (Note: Appearances in UEFA Europa League)	0	17	1
Young Boys	2017–18	Swiss Super League	19	0	4	0	6 (Note: One appearance in UEFA Champions League, five appearances in UEFA Europa League)	0	29	0
Young Boys	2018–19	Swiss Super League	26	4	3	0	6 (Note: Appearance(s) in UEFA Champions League)	0	35	4
Young Boys	2019–20	Swiss Super League	32	3	6	1	8 (Note: Two appearances in UEFA Champions League, six appearances in UEFA Europa League)	0	46	4
Young Boys	2020–21	Swiss Super League	27	2	1	0	11 (Note: Two appearances in UEFA Champions League, nine appearances in UEFA Europa League)	0	39	2
Young Boys	2021–22	Swiss Super League	15	2	2	1	11	1	28	3
Young Boys	Total		133	12	17	2	44	1	194	15
Bologna (loan)	2021–22	Serie A	12	0	—		—		12	0
Bologna	2022–23	Serie A	32	1	2	0	—		34	1
Bologna	2023–24	Serie A	36	0	4	0	—		40	0
Bologna	2024–25	Serie A	14	0	1	0	1	0	16	0
Bologna	Total		82	1	7	0	1	0	90	1
Pisa (loan)	2025–26	Serie A	35	1	1	0	—		36	1
Union Berlin	2026–27	Bundesliga	8	0	2	0	—		10	0
Career total			270	14	27	2	45	1	342	17

=== International ===
As of match played 13 November 2026

Appearances and goals by national team and year
National team	Year	Apps	Goals
Switzerland	2019	1	0
Switzerland	2020	2	0
Switzerland	2021	4	0
Switzerland	2022	6	0
Switzerland	2023	3	0
Switzerland	2024	13	1
Switzerland	2025	7	1
Switzerland	2026	12	0
Total		48	2

As of match played 10 June 2025
Scores and results list Switzerland's goal tally first.

List of international goals scored by Michel Aebischer
No.	Date	Venue	Cap	Opponent	Score	Result	Competition	Ref.
1	15 June 2024	RheinEnergieStadion, Cologne, Germany	21	Hungary	2–0	3–1	UEFA Euro 2024	
2	10 June 2025	Geodis Park, Nashville, United States	32	United States	2–0	4–0	Friendly	

== Honours ==
Young Boys

- Swiss Super League: 2017–18, 2018–19, 2019–20
- Swiss Cup: 2019–20

Bologna

- Coppa Italia: 2024–25

Individual

- Swiss Super League Team of the Year: 2019–20, 2020–21,
