= Christian Fassnacht =

Swiss footballer (born 1993)

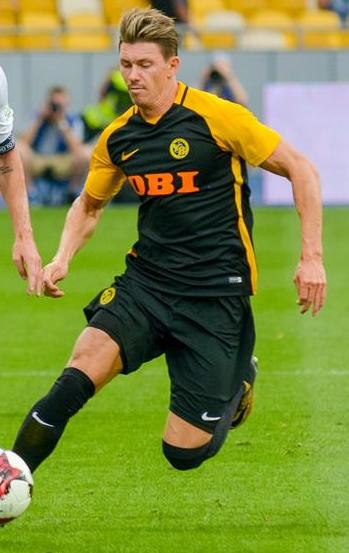
- Fassnacht playing for Young Boys in 2017

Personal information
- Full name: Christian Andreas Fassnacht
- Date of birth: 11 November 1993 (age 33)
- Place of birth: Zürich, Switzerland
- Height: 1.85 m (6 ft 1 in)
- Position: Right winger

Team information
- Current team: Young Boys
- Number: 16

Senior career*
Years	Team	Apps	(Gls)
2014	Tuggen	17	(10)
2015–2016	Winterthur	47	(11)
2016–2017	Thun	35	(10)
2017–2023	Young Boys	182	(58)
2023–2025	Norwich City	40	(6)
2025–	Young Boys	62	(35)

International career
2018–2026	Switzerland	24	(5)
- * Club domestic league appearances and goals as of 13:25, 8 November 2026 (UTC)

Christian Andreas Fassnacht (born 11 November 1993) is a Swiss professional footballer who plays as a right winger for Swiss Super League club Young Boys.

== Club career ==
=== Young Boys ===
Fassnacht was part of the Young Boys squad that won the 2017–18 Swiss Super League, their first league title in 32 years. He played an important role for the club during the title winning season, scoring 11 league goals.

On 3 October 2019, Fassnacht scored a late goal deep into second-half stoppage time to give Young Boys a 2–1 home win over Rangers in the Europa League group stage. On 25 February 2021, he scored in Young Boys' 2–0 second-leg victory over Bayer Leverkusen in the Europa League Round of 32, securing passage into the Round of 16 for the first time in club history.

=== Norwich City ===
On 25 July 2023, he departed Young Boys after six years at the club to join Norwich City, reuniting with his former head coach David Wagner.

On 12 August, he scored his first goal for Norwich City in a 4–4 draw against Southampton. He made his first start on 16 August in a Carabao Cup match against Queens Park Rangers and made his first league start in the following game on 20 August against Millwall. His second goal for Norwich was a consolation in a 2-1 defeat by Rotherham United. As the season went on, Fassnacht drifted in and out of the starting line-up. Although he played in 40 of the 46 league games, he only started 19 of them, with players like Jonathan Rowe, Marcelino Núñez and Borja Sainz providing alternatives alongside the established midfield pair of Kenny McLean and Gabriel Sara. He contributed 6 goals, the last coming in a 4-1 win over Cardiff City. The season ended with Norwich losing a play-off to Leeds United over two legs, with Fassnacht making substitute appearances in both games.

Fassnacht was added to the starting line-up of Norwich's first game of the 2024/25 season against Oxford United at a late stage, after Rowe withdrew himself from the squad over transfer speculation. The game ended in a 2–0 defeat, with Fassnacht being replaced by Adam Idah in the 61st minute. It was his last start for Norwich, with new manager Johannes Hoff Thorup having new signings Emiliano Marcondes, Oscar Schwartau and Anis Ben Slimane among his options along with the likes of McLean, Núñez and Sainz. Fassnacht would make two further appearances for Norwich as a substitute, the last being when he replaced Slimane in the 87th minute of a 2–0 defeat by Bristol City on 9 November.

=== Return to Young Boys ===
On 31 December 2024, his return to Young Boys was announced, thus returning to Switzerland after one and a half years in England. His new contract runs until summer 2027.

== International career ==
Fassnacht made his debut with the Switzerland national team (he never represented Switzerland before at any level) in a 2–1 away loss against Belgium. In 2021 he was called up to the national team for the 2020 UEFA European Championship, where the team created one of the main sensations of the tournament reaching the quarter-finals.

On 20 May 2026, Fassnacht was selected in the 26-man squad for the 2026 FIFA World Cup. After the tournament, he retired from the national team.

== Career statistics ==
=== Club ===
As of match played 19 September 2026

Appearances and goals by club, season and competition
Club	Season	League			National cup (Note: Includes Swiss Cup, FA Cup)		League cup (Note: Includes EFL Cup)		Europe		Other		Total	
Club	Season	Division	Apps	Goals	Apps	Goals	Apps	Goals	Apps	Goals	Apps	Goals	Apps	Goals
Tuggen	2014–15	Swiss Promotion League	17	10	1	1	—		—		—		18	11
Winterthur	2014–15	Swiss Challenge League	13	2	—		—		—		—		13	2
Winterthur	2015–16	Swiss Challenge League	34	9	3	0	—		—		—		37	9
Winterthur	Total		47	11	3	0	—		—		—		50	11
Thun	2016–17	Swiss Super League	35	10	1	0	—		—		—		36	10
Young Boys	2017–18	Swiss Super League	34	11	6	1	—		9 (Note: Four appearances and one goal in UEFA Champions League, five appearances and one goal in UEFA Europa League)	2	—		49	14
Young Boys	2018–19	Swiss Super League	35	11	4	0	—		8 (Note: Appearances in UEFA Champions League)	0	—		47	11
Young Boys	2019–20	Swiss Super League	30	7	6	3	—		8 (Note: Two appearances in UEFA Champions League, six appearances and two goals in UEFA Europa League)	2	—		44	12
Young Boys	2020–21	Swiss Super League	36	10	1	1	—		12 (Note: Two appearances in UEFA Champions League, ten appearances and four goals in UEFA Europa League)	4	—		49	15
Young Boys	2021–22	Swiss Super League	18	11	1	0	—		9	1	—		28	12
Young Boys	2022–23	Swiss Super League	29	8	4	2	—		1 (Note: Appearance in UEFA Europa Conference League)	1	—		34	11
Young Boys	Total		182	58	22	7	—		47	10	—		251	75
Norwich City	2023–24	Championship	40	6	3	0	2	0	—		2 (Note: Appearances in Championship play-offs)	0	47	6
Norwich City	2024–25	Championship	3	0	0	0	0	0	—		—		3	0
Norwich City	Total		43	6	3	0	2	0	—		2	0	50	6
Young Boys	2024–25	Swiss Super League	18	11	2	0	—		—		—		20	11
Young Boys	2025–26	Swiss Super League	33	18	1	0	—		8 (Note: Appearances in UEFA Europa League)	1	—		42	19
Young Boys	2026–27	Swiss Super League	7	4	1	1	—		—		—		8	5
Young Boys	Total		58	33	4	1	—		8	1	—		70	35
Career total			382	127	34	9	2	0	55	11	2	0	475	147

=== International ===
Appearances and goals by national team and year
National team	Year	Apps	Goals
Switzerland	2018	3	0
Switzerland	2019	2	1
Switzerland	2020	0	0
Switzerland	2021	10	3
Switzerland	2022	2	0
Switzerland	2023	2	0
Switzerland	2024	0	0
Switzerland	2025	2	0
Switzerland	2026	3	1
Total		24	5

Scores and results list Switzerland's goal tally first, score column indicates score after each Fassnacht goal.

List of international goals scored by Christian Fassnacht
No.	Date	Venue	Opponent	Score	Result	Competition
1	18 November 2019	Victoria Stadium, Gibraltar	Gibraltar	3–0	6–1	UEFA Euro 2020 qualification
2	3 June 2021	Kybunpark, St. Gallen, Switzerland	Liechtenstein	2–0	7–0	Friendly
3	3 June 2021	Kybunpark, St. Gallen, Switzerland	Liechtenstein	4–0	7–0	Friendly
4	9 October 2021	Stade de Genève, Geneva, Switzerland	Northern Ireland	2–0	2–0	2022 FIFA World Cup qualification
5	31 May 2026	Kybunpark, St. Gallen, Switzerland	Jordan	4–1	4–1	Friendly

== Honours ==
Young Boys

- Swiss Super League: 2017–18, 2018–19, 2019–20, 2020–21, 2022–23
- Swiss Cup: 2019–20, 2022–23

Individual

- Swiss Super League Team of the Year: 2019–20, 2020–21, 2022–23, 2025–26
- Swiss Super League Top Scorer: 2025–26
