= Jean-Pierre Nsame =

Cameroonian footballer (born 1993)

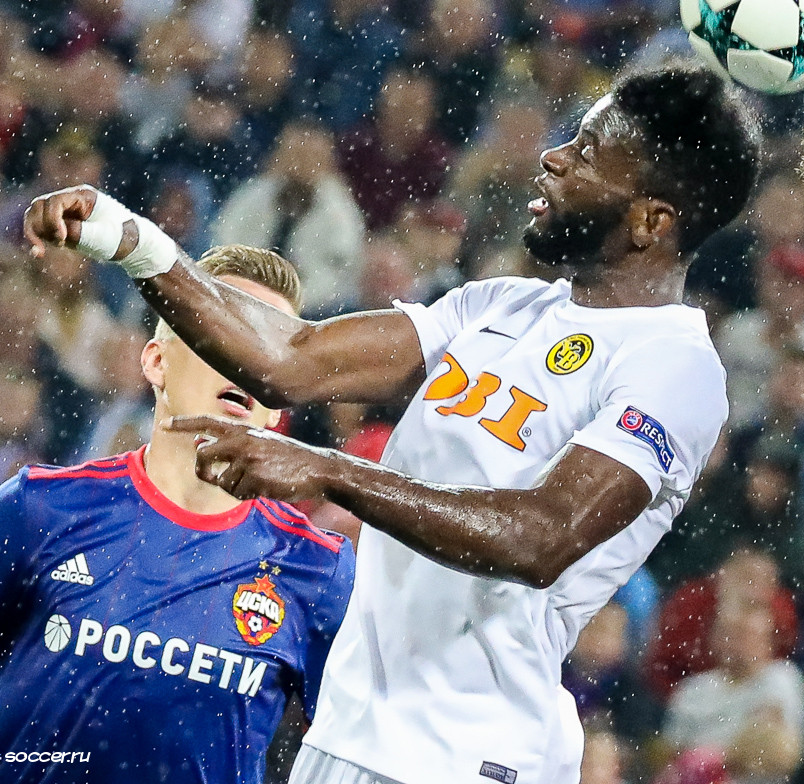
- Nsame playing for BSC Young Boys in 2017

Personal information
- Full name: Jean-Pierre Junior Nsame
- Date of birth: 1 May 1993 (age 33)
- Place of birth: Douala, Cameroon
- Height: 1.88 m (6 ft 2 in)
- Position: Forward

Team information
- Current team: Pogoń Szczecin
- Number: 17

Youth career
- 2008–2012: Angers

Senior career*
Years	Team	Apps	(Gls)
2012–2016	Angers II	38	(22)
2012–2016	Angers	23	(1)
2013–2014	→ Carquefou (loan)	22	(0)
2014–2015	→ Amiens (loan)	34	(7)
2016–2017	Servette	31	(23)
2017–2024	Young Boys	175	(109)
2022	→ Venezia (loan)	11	(0)
2024–2025	Como	8	(0)
2024–2025	→ Legia Warsaw (loan)	6	(1)
2025–2026	Legia Warsaw	10	(5)
2025	→ St. Gallen (loan)	13	(2)
2026	Legia Warsaw II	1	(1)
2026–	Pogoń Szczecin	0	(0)

International career
2017–2022	Cameroon	4	(0)
- * Club domestic league appearances and goals as of 00:05, 24 May 2026 (UTC)

Jean-Pierre Junior Nsame (born 1 May 1993) is a Cameroonian professional footballer who plays as a forward for Ekstraklasa club Pogoń Szczecin.

== Club career ==
=== Early career ===
Nsame made his professional debut in April 2012 for Angers in a 1–1 Ligue 2 draw against Metz. He made 23 appearances for Angers over four seasons with the club and also enjoyed loan spells with Carquefou and Amiens in the Championnat National.

At the end of the 2015–16 season, having failed to break into the first team on a regular basis, Nsame was released by the club. In July 2016, Nsame went on trial at English League One side Walsall and played in a 2–1 friendly defeat to Norwich City. However, after negative details emerged about his past, he was released by the club.

=== Servette ===
On 23 August 2016, Nsame signed for Swiss Challenge League side Servette. He finished as the league's top goalscorer with 23 goals, helping the club to an impressive third-place finish after their promotion the previous season.

=== Young Boys ===
His goals attracted interest from other clubs and in July 2017, after only one year in Geneva, he joined Young Boys of the Swiss Super League. In his first season, he was part of the Young Boys squad that won the Super League title for the first time in 32 years. They clinched the title with a 2–1 win over Luzern on 28 April 2018, with Nsame scoring an 89th-minute winner. He helped the club retain their title the following campaign, scoring 15 goals in 31 league appearances.

On 14 September 2019, Nsame netted his first hat-trick for the club in an 11–2 victory over fifth division side FC Freienbach in the second round of the Swiss Cup. Five days later, he scored his first goal in European competition in a 2–1 defeat to Portuguese side FC Porto in the group stage of the Europa League. On 24 November, he scored a hat-trick in a 4–3 win over FC Sion in the Swiss Super League; the match also saw Pajtim Kasami score a hat-trick for Sion.

In the 2019–20 Swiss Super league season Nsame finished the season as the league's top goalscorer with 32 goals in 32 matches and powered the Young Boys to winning the Swiss double, by winning the Swiss League for the 3rd straight time and the Swiss Cup.

==== Loan to Venezia ====
On 31 January 2022, Nsame joined Italian club Venezia on loan until the end of the 2021–22 season, with an option to buy.

=== Como ===
On 25 January 2024, Nsame signed a two-and-a-half-year contract with Como in Serie B.

=== Legia Warsaw ===
On 18 June 2024, Nsame was sent on loan to Ekstraklasa club Legia Warsaw, with an option to buy at the end of the season.

==== Loan to St. Gallen ====
On 30 January 2025, Legia activated his buy option and immediately sent him on loan, returning him to Switzerland to join St. Gallen for the remainder of the season. In 13 games at the Kybunpark, he scored two goals, which brought his Swiss Super League tally to 111, equaling Marco Streller's record. On 9 June 2025, St. Gallen announced that they would not be making use of the option to sign him permanently and he returned to Poland.

=== Pogoń Szczecin ===
By late June 2026, despite Nsame's intention to stay at Legia that was seconded by manager Marek Papszun, the club kept delaying offering him a new contract. On 23 June, he decided to move to league rivals Pogoń Szczecin on a twelve-month deal with an option for another year.

== International career ==
Nsame was called up to the Cameroon squad for the 2017 Confederations Cup.

He earned his first cap for Cameroon when he started their match against Nigeria on 4 September 2017 in a qualifying match for the 2018 World Cup.

On 9 November 2022, he was named in the final squad for the 2022 FIFA World Cup in Qatar.

== Personal life ==
His family name is correctly spelled Nsame, not Nsamé.

== Career statistics ==
=== Club ===
As of match played 23 May 2026

Appearances and goals by club, season and competition
Club	Season	League			National cup (Note: Includes Coupe de France, Swiss Cup, Polish Cup)		League cup (Note: Includes Coupe de la Ligue)		Europe		Other		Total	
Club	Season	Division	Apps	Goals	Apps	Goals	Apps	Goals	Apps	Goals	Apps	Goals	Apps	Goals
Angers	2011–12	Ligue 2	1	0	0	0	—		—		—		1	0
Angers	2012–13	Ligue 2	17	1	1	0	1	0	—		—		19	1
Angers	2015–16	Ligue 1	5	0	1	0	1	0	—		—		7	0
Angers	Total		23	1	2	0	2	0	—		—		27	1
Carquefou (loan)	2013–14	Championnat National	22	0	6	0	—		—		—		28	0
Amiens (loan)	2014–15	Championnat National	34	7	2	3	—		—		—		36	10
Servette	2016–17	Swiss Challenge League	31	23	0	0	—		—		—		31	23
Young Boys	2017–18	Swiss Super League	31	13	5	2	—		9 (Note: Three appearances in UEFA Champions League, six appearances in UEFA Europa League)	0	—		45	15
Young Boys	2018–19	Swiss Super League	31	15	4	1	—		5 (Note: Appearances in UEFA Champions League)	0	—		40	16
Young Boys	2019–20	Swiss Super League	32	32	6	7	—		8 (Note: Two appearances in UEFA Champions League, six appearances and two goals in UEFA Europa League)	2	—		46	41
Young Boys	2020–21	Swiss Super League	30	19	1	0	—		11 (Note: Two appearances and one goal in UEFA Champions League, nine appearances and six goals in UEFA Europa League)	7	—		42	26
Young Boys	2022–23	Swiss Super League	33	21	4	5	—		6 (Note: Appearances in UEFA Conference League)	4	—		43	30
Young Boys	2023–24	Swiss Super League	18	9	3	3	—		4	0	—		25	12
Young Boys	Total		175	109	23	18	—		43	13	—		241	140
Venezia (loan)	2021–22	Serie A	11	0	—		—		—		—		11	0
Como	2023–24	Serie B	8	0	—		—		—		—		8	0
Legia Warsaw (loan)	2024–25	Ekstraklasa	6	1	1	0	—		3	1	—		10	2
St. Gallen (loan)	2024–25	Swiss Super League	13	2	0	0	—		—		—		13	2
Legia Warsaw	2025–26	Ekstraklasa	10	5	0	0	—		7 (Note: Five appearances and four goals in UEFA Europa League, two appearances and one goal in UEFA Conference League)	5	1 (Note: Appearance in Polish Super Cup)	0	18	10
Legia Warsaw II	2025–26	III liga, group I	1	1	0	0	—		—		—		1	1
Pogoń Szczecin	2026–27	Ekstraklasa	0	0	0	0	—		—		—		0	0
Career total			334	149	34	21	2	0	53	19	1	0	424	189

=== International ===
As of match played 27 September 2022

Appearances and goals by national team and year
National team	Year	Apps	Goals
Cameroon	2017	1	0
Cameroon	2019	1	0
Cameroon	2022	2	0
Total		4	0

== Honours ==
Young Boys

- Swiss Super League: 2017–18, 2018–19, 2019–20, 2020–21, 2022–23
- Swiss Cup: 2019–20, 2022–23

Legia Warsaw

- Polish Super Cup: 2025

Legia Warsaw II

- III liga, group I: 2025–26

Individual

- Swiss Super League Player of the Year: 2019–20, 2020–21
- Swiss Super League top scorer: 2019–20, 2020–21, 2022–23
- Swiss Super League Goal of the Year: 2016–17, 2017–18,
- Swiss Super League Team of the Year: 2019–20, 2020–21
- Swiss Cup top scorer: 2019–20, 2022–23
- Swiss Challenge League top scorer: 2016–17
