= Ulisses Garcia =

Footballer (born 1996)

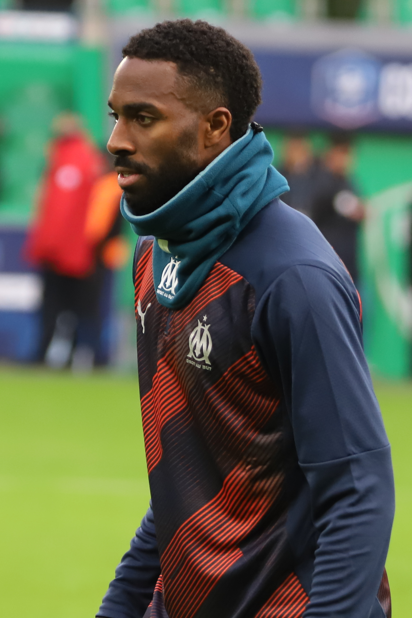
- Garcia warming up for Olympique Marseille in 2024

Personal information
- Full name: Ulisses Alexandre Garcia Lopes
- Date of birth: 11 January 1996 (age 30)
- Place of birth: Almada, Portugal
- Height: 1.82 m (6 ft 0 in)
- Position: Left-back

Team information
- Current team: Marseille
- Number: 25

Youth career
- 2004–2009: FC Onex
- 2009–2011: Servette
- 2011–2014: Grasshoppers

Senior career*
Years	Team	Apps	(Gls)
2012–2015	Grasshoppers II	34	(0)
2014–2015	Grasshoppers	1	(0)
2016–2017	Werder Bremen II	8	(1)
2015–2018	Werder Bremen	19	(0)
2018	→ Nürnberg (loan)	2	(0)
2018–2024	Young Boys	142	(9)
2018–2023	Young Boys II	4	(1)
2024–	Marseille	44	(2)
2026	→ Sassuolo (loan)	13	(1)

International career^{‡}
2011	Switzerland U16	2	(0)
2013–2014	Switzerland U18	7	(0)
2014	Switzerland U19	7	(1)
2017	Switzerland U20	2	(0)
2015–2018	Switzerland U21	17	(1)
2021–	Switzerland	11	(0)
- * Club domestic league appearances and goals as of 22 November 2026 ‡ National team caps and goals as of 23:56, 7 June 2025 (UTC)

Ulisses Alexandre Garcia Lopes (born 11 January 1996) is a Swiss professional footballer who plays as a left-back for French side Marseille. Born in Portugal to parents of Cape Verdean descent and raised in Switzerland, he plays for the Switzerland national team.

== Club career ==
=== Early career ===
Garcia is a youth exponent from Grasshopper Club Zürich. He made his Swiss Super League debut at 18 May 2014 against FC Sion. He played the full game, which ended in a 3–1 defeat in Sion.

=== Werder Bremen ===
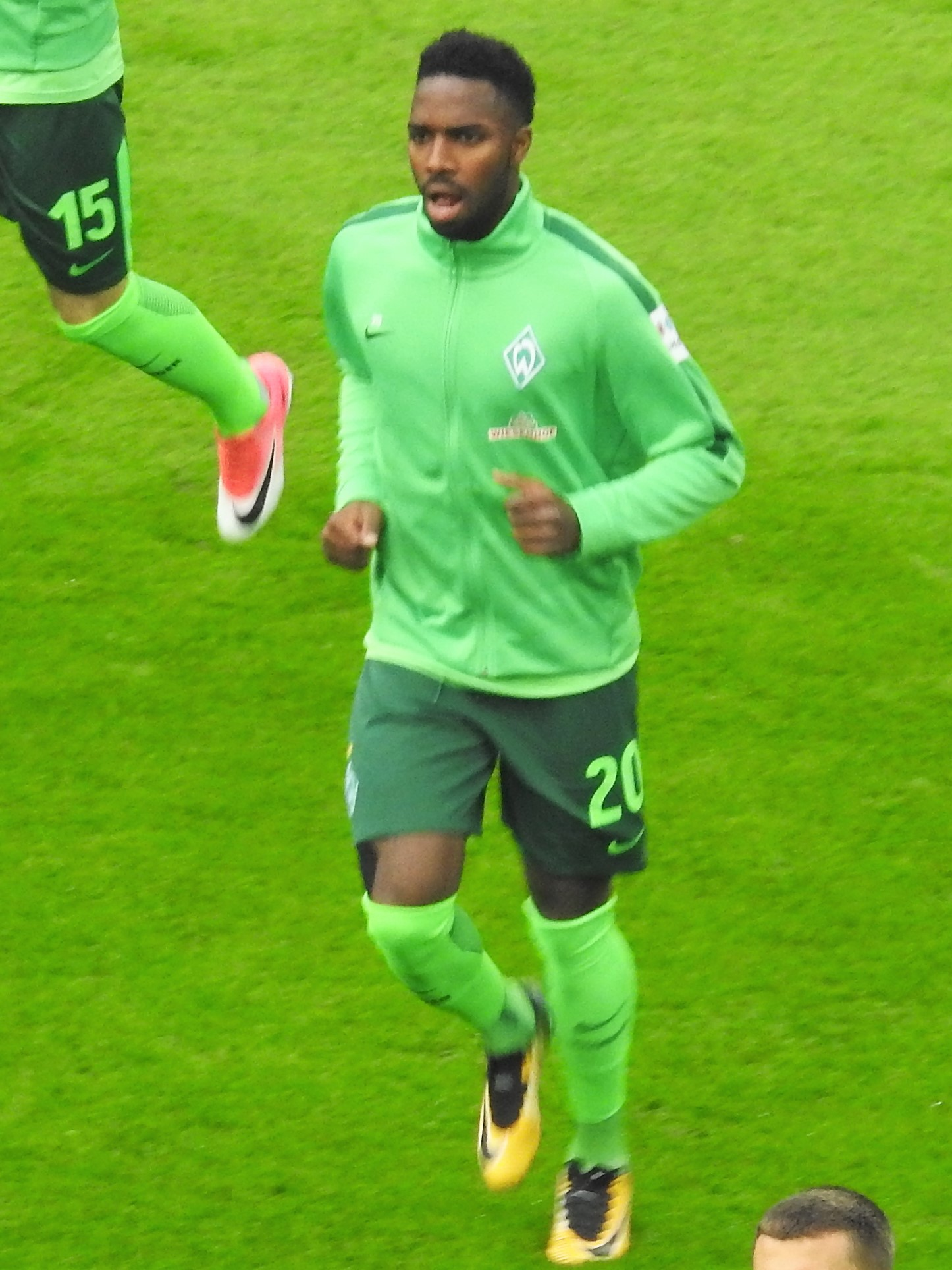
Garcia training with Werder Bremen in 2017

On 26 May 2015, Werder Bremen announced their signing of Garcia. Garcia joined the Bundesliga club on a three-year contract. With Santiago García recovering from a long-standing injury, Ulisses Garcia went into the season as first-choice left back ahead of Janek Sternberg. Upon Santiago García's return, Ulisses Garcia was mostly deployed in left midfield.

=== Young Boys ===
In June 2018, Garcia joined Swiss Super League side BSC Young Boys on a four-year contract. The transfer fee paid to Werder Bremen was reported as €800,000.

=== Marseille ===
In January 2024, Garcia signed for Ligue 1 club Marseille on a four-and-a-half-year deal for a reported fee of €3 million.

On 2 February 2026, Garcia joined Sassuolo in Italy on loan with an option to buy.

== International career ==
Garcia is eligible to play for all three countries. However, he has appeared exclusively for Switzerland in youth international, with seven appearances for the Swiss U19s, 17 with the U21 team.

He was first called up to the Switzerland national football team in June 2017 for games against Belarus and Faroe Islands, but did not play. He made his debut on 1 September 2021 in a friendly against Greece, a 2–1 home victory. He substituted Silvan Widmer at half-time.

== Career statistics ==
=== Club ===
As of match played 22 October 2026

Appearances and goals by club, season and competition
Club	Season	League			National cup (Note: Includes DFB-Pokal, Swiss Cup, Coupe de France)		Europe		Total	
Club	Season	Division	Apps	Goals	Apps	Goals	Apps	Goals	Apps	Goals
Grasshoppers	2013–14	Swiss Super League	1	0	0	0	0	0	1	0
Grasshoppers	2014–15	Swiss Super League	0	0	0	0	1 (Note: Appearance in UEFA Europa League)	0	1	0
Grasshoppers	Total		1	0	0	0	1	0	2	0
Werder Bremen	2015–16	Bundesliga	11	0	2	0	—		13	0
Werder Bremen	2016–17	Bundesliga	7	0	0	0	—		7	0
Werder Bremen	2017–18	Bundesliga	1	0	2	0	—		3	0
Werder Bremen	Total		19	0	4	0	0	0	23	0
Werder Bremen II	2015–16	3. Liga	4	0	—		—		4	0
Werder Bremen II	2016–17	3. Liga	3	1	—		—		3	1
Werder Bremen II	2017–18	3. Liga	1	0	—		—		1	0
Werder Bremen II	Total		8	1	—		—		8	1
1. FC Nürnberg (loan)	2017–18	2. Bundesliga	2	0	—		—		2	0
Young Boys	2018–19	Swiss Super League	23	3	4	1	2 (Note: Appearances in UEFA Champions League)	0	29	4
Young Boys	2019–20	Swiss Super League	26	1	6	0	7 (Note: One appearance in UEFA Champions League, six appearances in UEFA Europa League)	0	39	1
Young Boys	2020–21	Swiss Super League	25	1	0	0	8 (Note: One appearance in UEFA Champions League, seven appearances in UEFA Europa League)	0	33	1
Young Boys	2021–22	Swiss Super League	27	2	1	0	6	2	34	2
Young Boys	2022–23	Swiss Super League	27	1	4	0	2 (Note: Appearances in UEFA Conference League)	2	33	2
Young Boys	2023–24	Swiss Super League	14	1	2	0	6	0	22	1
Young Boys	Total		142	9	17	1	31	2	191	11
Young Boys U21	2022–23	Swiss Promotion League	1	1	—		—		1	1
Young Boys U21	2023–24	Swiss Promotion League	2	0	—		—		2	0
Young Boys U21	Total		3	1	–		–		3	1
Marseille	2023–24	Ligue 1	13	0	1	0	0	0	14	0
Marseille	2024–25	Ligue 1	20	2	0	0	—		20	2
Marseille	2025–26	Ligue 1	4	0	0	0	2	0	6	0
Marseille	2026–27	Ligue 1	2	0	0	0	3 (Note: Appearance(s) in UEFA Europa League)	0	5	0
Marseille	Total		39	2	1	0	5	0	45	2
Sassuolo (loan)	2025–26	Serie A	8	1	—		—		8	1
Career total			222	14	22	1	37	2	279	15

=== International ===
As of match played 7 June 2025

Appearances and goals by national team and year
National team	Year	Apps	Goals
Switzerland	2021	4	0
Switzerland	2023	3	0
Switzerland	2024	3	0
Switzerland	2025	1	0
Total		11	0

== Honours ==
Young Boys

- Swiss Super League: 2018–19, 2019–20, 2020–21, 2022–23
- Swiss Cup: 2019–20, 2022–23

=== Individual ===
- Swiss Super League Top assists provider: 2022–23 (shared)
- Swiss Super League Team of the Year: 2018–19, 2019–20, 2020–21, 2021–22
