= Felix Mambimbi =

Swiss footballer (born 2001)

Personal information
- Full name: Felix Khonde Mambimbi
- Date of birth: 18 January 2001 (age 25)
- Place of birth: Fribourg, Switzerland
- Height: 1.70 m (5 ft 7 in)
- Position: Forward

Team information
- Current team: Le Havre
- Number: 10

Youth career
- 2009–2014: Schönberg
- 2014–2019: Young Boys

Senior career*
| Years | Team | Apps | (Gls) |
| 2018–2019 | Young Boys U21 | 35 | (19) |
| 2019–2023 | Young Boys | 75 | (10) |
| 2022–2023 | → Cambuur (loan) | 8 | (0) |
| 2023 | Young Boys U21 | 4 | (2) |
| 2023–2025 | St. Gallen | 40 | (3) |
| 2025– | Le Havre | 17 | (1) |

International career
| 2015–2016 | Switzerland U15 | 5 | (0) |
| 2016–2017 | Switzerland U16 | 9 | (1) |
| 2017–2018 | Switzerland U17 | 12 | (5) |
| 2019–2020 | Switzerland U19 | 7 | (3) |
| 2020–2022 | Switzerland U21 | 19 | (4) |
- * Club domestic league appearances and goals as of 17 May 2026

Felix Khonde Mambimbi (born 18 January 2001) is a Swiss professional footballer who plays as a forward for Ligue 1 club Le Havre.

== Club career ==
Mambimbi made his Swiss Super League debut for Young Boys on 17 February 2019 in a game against Zürich, as a 90th-minute substitute for Moumi Ngamaleu. Mambimbi has represented Young Boys in the UEFA Champions League playing teams such as Manchester United, Villarreal and Atalanta.

On 31 August 2022, Mambimbi joined Cambuur in the Netherlands on a season-long loan.

On 2 September 2023, Mambimbi signed a two-year contract with St. Gallen.

On 11 July 2025, Mambimbi moved to Le Havre in France on a two-season deal.

== International career ==
Born in Switzerland, Mambimbi is of Congolese descent. He is a youth international for Switzerland and has played for the Swiss U16, U17, U19 and U21 teams. Most recently, Mambimbi played for the Swiss team during qualification for the UEFA Under 21's European Championship.

== Career statistics ==
As of 17 May 2026

Appearances and goals by club, season and competition
| Club | Season | League | | | National cup (Note: Includes Swiss Cup, KNVB Cup) | | Continental | | Other | | Total | |
| Club | Season | Division | Apps | Goals | Apps | Goals | Apps | Goals | Apps | Goals | Apps | Goals |
|---|---|---|---|---|---|---|---|---|---|---|---|---|
| Young Boys U21 | 2017–18 | Swiss Promotion League | 9 | 6 | — | | — | | 2 (Note: Appearances in Promotion League Playoff) | 1 | 11 | 7 |
| Young Boys U21 | 2018–19 | Swiss Promotion League | 21 | 2 | — | | — | | — | | 21 | 2 |
| Young Boys U21 | 2018–19 | Swiss Promotion League | 5 | 11 | — | | — | | — | | 5 | 11 |
| Young Boys U21 | Total | | 35 | 19 | — | | — | | 2 | 1 | 37 | 20 |
| Young Boys | 2018–19 | Swiss Super League | 2 | 0 | 0 | 0 | — | | — | | 2 | 0 |
| Young Boys | 2019–20 | Swiss Super League | 17 | 1 | 3 | 1 | 2 (Note: Appearances in UEFA Europa League) | 0 | — | | 22 | 2 |
| Young Boys | 2020–21 | Swiss Super League | 31 | 6 | 1 | 0 | 11 (Note: One appearance in UEFA Champions League, nine appearances and two goals in UEFA Europa League) | 2 | — | | 43 | 8 |
| Young Boys | 2021–22 | Swiss Super League | 25 | 3 | 3 | 0 | 8 (Note: Appearances in UEFA Champions League) | 1 | — | | 36 | 9 |
| Young Boys | 2022–23 | Swiss Super League | 0 | 0 | 0 | 0 | 3 (Note: Appearances in UEFA Conference League) | 0 | — | | 3 | 0 |
| Young Boys | Total | | 75 | 10 | 7 | 1 | 24 | 3 | — | | 81 | 11 |
| Cambuur (loan) | 2022–23 | Eredivisie | 8 | 0 | 1 | 0 | — | | — | | 9 | 0 |
| Young Boys U21 | 2023–24 | Swiss Promotion League | 4 | 2 | — | | — | | — | | 4 | 2 |
| St. Gallen | 2023–24 | Swiss Super League | 12 | 0 | — | | — | | — | | 12 | 0 |
| St. Gallen | 2024–25 | Swiss Super League | 28 | 3 | 2 | 0 | 8 | 2 | — | | 38 | 5 |
| St. Gallen | Total | | 40 | 3 | 2 | 0 | 8 | 2 | — | | 50 | 5 |
| Le Havre | 2025–26 | Ligue 1 | 17 | 1 | 0 | 0 | — | | — | | 17 | 1 |
| Career total | | | 179 | 35 | 10 | 1 | 32 | 5 | 2 | 1 | 223 | 42 |

== Honours ==
Young Boys

- Swiss Super League: 2018–19, 2019–20
- Swiss Cup: 2019–20
