= 2019–20 Swiss Cup =

Tournament details
- Country: Switzerland
- Date: 16 August 2019 – 30 August 2020 (originally until 24 May 2020)
- Teams: 64

Final positions
- Champions: Young Boys (7th title)
- Runners-up: Basel

The 2019–20 Swiss Cup was the 95th season of Switzerland's annual football cup competition. The competition began on 16 August 2019 with the first games of Round 1 was originally scheduled to end on 24 May 2020 but the final was rescheduled to 30 August 2020, due to the COVID-19 pandemic.

Basel were the title holders. They were beaten in the final by Young Boys of Bern, securing their first Swiss Cup title since 1987.

== Participating clubs ==
All teams from 2018–19 Super League and 2018–19 Challenge League as well as the top 4 teams from 2018–19 Promotion League automatically entered this year's competition. The remaining 41 teams had to qualify through separate qualifying rounds within their leagues. Reserve teams and A-teams from Liechtenstein were not allowed in the competition, the latter only entered the 2019–20 Liechtenstein Cup.

**2019–20 Super League**; 10 teams	**2019–20 Challenge League**; 9 teams	**2019–20 Promotion League**; 9 teams	**2019–20 1. Liga**; 10 teams	**2019–20 2. Liga Interregional**; 12 teams	**2019–20 Regional leagues** 14 teams
**FC Basel** (BS); FC Lugano (TI); **FC Luzern** (LU); Neuchâtel Xamax FCS (NE); **FC Sion** (VS); FC St. Gallen (SG); Servette FC (GE); FC Thun (BE); **BSC Young Boys** (BE); FC Zürich ^{TH} (ZH)	FC Aarau (AG); FC Chiasso (TI); Grasshopper Zürich (ZH); SC Kriens (LU); **FC Lausanne-Sport** (VD); FC Schaffhausen (SH); FC Stade-Lausanne-Ouchy (VD); FC Wil (SG); **FC Winterthur** (ZH)	**FC Bavois** (VD); AC Bellinzona (TI); FC Black Stars (BS); SC Cham (ZG); Étoile Carouge FC (GE); **FC Rapperswil-Jona** (SG); FC Stade Nyonnais (VD); SC YF Juventus (ZH); Yverdon Sport FC (VD)	FC Bassecourt (JU); FC Bulle (FR); FC Échallens Région (VD); Lancy FC (GE); FC Linth 04 (GL); Meyrin FC (GE); Olympique de Genève FC (GE); FC Red Star Zürich (ZH); FC Wettswil-Bonstetten (ZH); FC Wohlen (AG)	FC Allschwil (BL); AS Calcio Kreuzlingen (TG); FC Freienbach (SZ); FC Gambarogno-Contone (TI); FC Monthey (VS); FC Muri (AG); FC Olten (SO); FC Rotkreuz (ZG); Signal FC Bernex-Confignon (GE); FC Spiez (BE); FC Sursee (LU); AC Taverne (TI)	**Sixth tier**: FC Altstätten (SG); FC Béroche-Gorgier (NE); FC Concordia Basel (BS); FC Iliria (SO); FC Perly-Certoux (GE); FC Mutschellen (AG); Pully Football (VD); FC Rothorn (BE); FC Saxon Sports (VS); FC Schoenberg (FR); FC Seefeld (ZH); FC Uster (ZH); FC Wetzikon (ZH); **Eighth tier**: FC Escholzmatt-Marbach (LU)

Teams in bold are still active in the competition.

^{TH} Title holders.

== Round 1 ==
Teams from Super League and Challenge League were seeded in this round. In a match, the home advantage was granted to the team from the lower league, if applicable. Teams in bold continue to the next round of the competition.

Team 1	Score	Team 2
**16 August 2019**
Étoile Carouge FC (3)	0–1	**BSC Young Boys** (1)
FC Concordia Basel (6)	0–5	**FC Lugano** (1)
**17 August 2019**
SC YF Juventus (3)	0–3	**FC Winterthur** (2)
FC Red Star Zürich (4)	1–3	**FC Wil** (2)
**FC Wohlen** (4)	2–1	FC Wettswil-Bonstetten (4)
FC Wetzikon (6)	1–3	**Meyrin FC** (4)
FC Black Stars (3)	1–2	**FC Zürich** (1)
FC Échallens Région (4)	0–6	**Servette FC** (1)
Pully Football (6)	1–4	**FC Basel** (1)
FC Seefeld (6)	1–9	**Grasshopper Zürich** (2)
FC Altstätten (6)	1–3	**FC Bassecourt** (4)
FC Rothorn (6)	1–3 (a.e.t.)	**FC Sursee** (5)
FC Allschwil (5)	1–10	**FC Sion** (1)
**FC Bulle** (4)	2–1 (a.e.t.)	FC Chiasso (2)
AC Taverne (5)	1–4	**SC Kriens** (2)
FC Iliria (6)	1–6	**FC Lausanne-Sport** (2)
FC Perly-Certoux (6)	0–5	**FC Stade-Lausanne-Ouchy** (2)
FC Muri (5)	2–3	**FC Rapperswil-Jona** (3)
FC Rotkreuz (5)	0–2	**FC Freienbach** (5)
FC Saxon Sports (6)	2–4	**FC Spiez** (5)
FC Gambarogno-Contone (5)	0–5	**AC Bellinzona** (3)
FC Monthey (5)	1–4	**FC St. Gallen** (1)
FC Mutschellen (6)	0–3	**FC Stade Nyonnais** (3)
**18 August 2019**
SC Cham (3)	2–2 (1–3 p)	**FC Aarau** (2)
**FC Linth 04** (4)	3–1	FC Schaffhausen (2)
**FC Béroche-Gorgier** (6)	1–1 (5–4 p)	FC Olten (5)
Signal FC Bernex-Confignon (5)	0–2	**FC Thun** (1)
FC Escholzmatt-Marbach (8)	0–14	**FC Bavois** (3)
FC Schoenberg (6)	1–5	**Olympique de Genève FC** (4)
FC Uster (6)	1–3	**Lancy FC** (4)
Yverdon Sport FC (3)	1–2	**Neuchâtel Xamax FCS** (1)
AS Calcio Kreuzlingen (5)	0–2	**FC Luzern** (1)

== Round 2 ==
The winners of Round 1 played in this round. Teams from Super League were seeded, the home advantage was granted to the team from the lower league, if applicable.

Team 1	Score	Team 2
13 September 2019
Grasshopper Club Zürich (2)	1–0	Servette FC (1)
FC Winterthur (2)	2–0	FC St. Gallen (1)
14 September 2019
FC Spiez (5)	0–4	FC Linth 04 (4)
FC Sursee (5)	1–2	FC Bulle (4)
FC Freienbach (5)	2–11	BSC Young Boys (1)
SC Kriens (2)	2–4	FC Stade-Lausanne-Ouchy (2)
FC Béroche-Gorgier (6)	2–1	Lancy FC (4)
FC Lausanne-Sport (2)	3–0	FC Lugano (1)
Olympique de Genève FC (4)	1–2	FC Bavois (3)
FC Wil (2)	1–2	FC Zürich (1)
Meyrin FC (4)	0–3	FC Basel (1)
15 September 2019
FC Stade Nyonnais (3)	0–1	FC Thun (1)
AC Bellinzona (3)	1–2	Neuchâtel Xamax FCS (1)
FC Bassecourt (4)	0–3	FC Rapperswil-Jona (3)
FC Aarau (2)	1–2	FC Sion (1)
FC Wohlen (4)	0–4	FC Luzern (1)

== Round 3 ==
Team 1	Score	Team 2
29 October 2019
FC Béroche-Gorgier (6)	1–7	FC Bavois (3)
30 October 2019
Grasshopper Club Zürich (2)	0–1	FC Luzern (1)
FC Winterthur (2)	1–0	FC Thun (1)
FC Linth 04 (4)	0–2	FC Sion (1)
FC Zürich (1)	0–4	BSC Young Boys (1)
FC Stade-Lausanne-Ouchy (2)	1–2	FC Basel (1)
31 October 2019
FC Bulle (4)	2–3	FC Rapperswil-Jona (3)
FC Lausanne-Sport (2)	6–0	Neuchâtel Xamax FCS (1)

== Quarter-finals ==
14 June 2020	FC Lausanne-Sport	2–3 (a.e.t.)	FC Basel	Lausanne
16:00	Zeqiri 72'; Geissmann 73'		54', 67' Cabral; 105+2' Widmer	Stadium: Stade Olympique de la Pontaise; Attendance: 300; Referee: Alain Bieri

5 August 2020	FC Winterthur	4–0	FC Bavois	Zurich
18:00	Buess 20'; Pepsi 45+1'; Callà 75'; Mahamid 87'			Stadium: Utogrund; Attendance: 400; Referee: Alessandro Dudic

6 August 2020	FC Luzern	1–2 (a.e.t.)	BSC Young Boys	Lucerne
18:00	Margiotta 33'		35' Nsame; 116' Gaudino	Stadium: Swissporarena; Attendance: 1,000; Referee: Adrien Jaccottet

6 August 2020	FC Rapperswil-Jona	1–2	FC Sion	Rapperswil-Jona
18:00	Ferreira 67'		3' Uldriķis; 22' (pen.) Grgić	Stadium: Stadion Grünfeld; Attendance: 1,000; Referee: Lionel Tschudi

== Semi-finals ==
9 August 2020	BSC Young Boys	3–1	FC Sion	Bern
16:00	Nsame 72'; Martins 90'; Mambimbi 90+3'		80' Uldriķis	Stadium: Stadion Wankdorf; Attendance: 600; Referee: Fedayi San

25 August 2020	FC Basel	6–1	FC Winterthur	Basel
20:15	Stocker 2'; Widmer 5' van Wolfswinkel 22' 62'; Pululu 51'; Frei 63'		32' Buess	Stadium: St. Jakob-Park; Attendance: 1,000; Referee: Stefan Horisberger

== Final ==
30 August 2020
17:30

FC Basel	1–2	BSC Young Boys
Widmer (yellow card) 12'; Alderete 42'; Marchand (yellow card) 62'; Ademi (yellow card) 68'; Van der Werff (yellow card) 74'	ASF/SFV	Martins (yellow card) 5'; Nsame 50'; Garcia (yellow card) 69'; Ngamaleu (yellow card) 74'; Spielmann 89'

Stadion Wankdorf, Bern
Attendance: 1,000
Referee: Sandro Schärer

GK	(Serbia) Đorđe Nikolić
DF	(Switzerland) Silvan Widmer
DF	(Switzerland) Jasper van der Werff
DF	(Paraguay) Omar Alderete
DF	(Italy) Raoul Petretta
MF	(Switzerland) Fabian Frei
MF	(Switzerland) Yannick Marchand	(substituted off) 80'
MF	(Switzerland) Valentin Stocker (c)	(substituted off) 86'
MF	(Netherlands) Ricky van Wolfswinkel
ST	(Angola) Afimico Pululu
ST	(Germany) Kemal Ademi
Substitutes:
DF	(Switzerland) Eray Cömert	(substituted on) 80'
MF	(Switzerland) Samuele Campo	(substituted on) 86'
Manager:
(Switzerland) Marcel Koller

GK	(Switzerland) David von Ballmoos
DF	(France) Jordan Lefort
DF	(Guinea) Mohamed Ali Camara
DF	(Switzerland) Fabian Lustenberger (c)	(substituted off) 49'
DF	(Switzerland) Ulisses Garcia	(substituted off) 82'
MF	(Serbia) Miralem Sulejmani	(substituted off) 66'
MF	(Switzerland) Michel Aebischer
MF	(Luxembourg) Christopher Martins	(substituted off) 66'
MF	(Cameroon) Moumi Ngamaleu	(substituted off) 82'
MF	(Switzerland) Christian Fassnacht
ST	(Cameroon) Jean-Pierre Nsame
Substitutes:
DF	(Switzerland) Cédric Zesiger	(substituted on) 49'
MF	(Germany) Gianluca Gaudino	(substituted on) 66'
MF	(Switzerland) Vincent Sierro	(substituted on) 66'
MF	(Switzerland) Marvin Spielmann	(substituted on) 82'
FW	(France) Guillaume Hoarau	(substituted on) 82'
Manager:
(Switzerland) Gerardo Seoane

== Top scorers ==
Rank	Player	Club(s)	Goals
1	(Cameroon) Jean-Pierre Nsame	BSC Young Boys	7
2	(Bosnia and Herzegovina) Mehmed Begzadić	FC Bavois	5
2	(Switzerland) Nassim Ben Khalifa	Grasshopper Club Zürich	5
2	(Switzerland) Anđelko Savić	FC Bavois	5
3	(Switzerland) Adrian Alvarez	FC Bavois	4
3	(Switzerland) Alex Gauthier	FC Bavois	4
3	(Switzerland) Pajtim Kasami	FC Sion	4
3	(Cameroon) Moumi Ngamaleu	BSC Young Boys	4
3	(Cameroon) Jean-Pierre Nsame	BSC Young Boys	4
3	(Switzerland) Bastien Toma	FC Sion	4
3	(Switzerland) Andi Zeqiri	FC Lausanne-Sport	4

== Sources ==
- Switzerland 2019–20 by Karel Stokkermans at Rec.Sport.Soccer Statistics Foundation
