= Jordan Lefort =

Mauritanian footballer (born 1993)

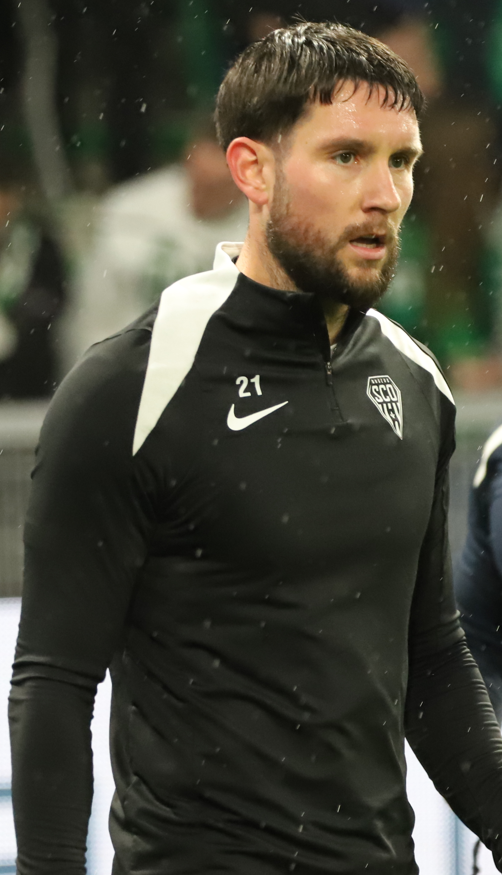
- Lefort with Angers in 2025

Personal information
- Date of birth: 9 August 1993 (age 33)
- Place of birth: Champigny-sur-Marne, France
- Height: 1.83 m (6 ft 0 in)
- Position: Defender

Team information
- Current team: Angers
- Number: 21

Youth career
- CFFP
- –2010: AS Montferrand
- 2010–2011: Strasbourg
- 2011–2013: Amiens

Senior career*
Years	Team	Apps	(Gls)
2012–2016	Amiens B	64	(3)
2013–2020	Amiens	85	(1)
2017–2018	→ US Quevilly (loan)	37	(2)
2020	→ Young Boys (loan)	15	(0)
2021–2022	Young Boys	50	(1)
2022–2023	Paris FC	32	(0)
2023–	Angers	105	(0)

International career^{‡}
2026–	Mauritania	4	(1)
- * Club domestic league appearances and goals as of 20 May 2026 ‡ National team caps and goals as of 28 September 2026

Jordan Lefort (French: [ʒɔʁdan ləfɔʁ]; born 9 August 1993) is a professional footballer who plays for Ligue 1 club Angers as a defender. Born in France, he represents the Mauritania national team.

== Club career ==
Lefort spent time in the youth system at Strasbourg before joining Amiens in 2011, and made his senior debut in the 1–0 win over Châteauroux on 6 August 2013 in the first round of the Coupe de la Ligue. In 2020, he was loaned to the Swiss club Young Boys.

On 30 August 2022, Lefort signed a two-year contract with Paris FC.

== International career ==
Lefort, who was born in the Paris suburb of Champigny-sur-Marne, became eligible to play for the Mauritania national football team after he was nationalized through marriage to his Mauritanian wife. He was first called up to the Mauritania national team in March 2026 for friendlies against Argentina and Palestine. In his debut game against Argentina, Lefort also scored a goal from a corner in extra time in a 2–1 loss to the reigning World Cup champions.

== Career statistics ==
As of 17 May 2024

Appearances and goals by club, season and competition
Club	Season	League			National cup (Note: Includes Coupe de France and Swiss Cup)		League cup (Note: Includes Coupe de la Ligue)		Continental		Other		Total	
Club	Season	Division	Apps	Goals	Apps	Goals	Apps	Goals	Apps	Goals	Apps	Goals	Apps	Goals
Amiens	2013–14	National	1	0	2	0	1	0	—		—		4	0
Amiens	2014–15	National	11	0	2	0	0	0	—		—		13	0
Amiens	2015–16	National	13	0	0	0	0	0	—		—		13	0
Amiens	2016–17	Ligue 2	27	1	0	0	0	0	—		—		27	1
Amiens	2018–19	Ligue 1	23	0	2	0	2	0	—		—		27	0
Amiens	2019–20	Ligue 1	10	0	1	0	3	0	—		—		14	0
Amiens	Total		85	1	7	0	6	0	0	0	0	0	98	1
Quevilly-Rouen (loan)	2017–18	Ligue 2	37	2	1	0	1	0	—		—		39	2
Young Boys (loan)	2019–20	Swiss Super League	15	0	3	0	—		—		—		18	0
Young Boys	2020–21	Swiss Super League	28	1	1	0	—		11 (Note: Two appearances in UEFA Champions League, nine in UEFA Europa League)	0	—		40	1
Young Boys	2021–22	Swiss Super League	20	0	2	0	—		5 (Note: Appearances in UEFA Champions League)	0	—		27	0
Young Boys	2022–23	Swiss Super League	2	0	1	0	—		2 (Note: Appearances in UEFA Europa Conference League)	0	—		5	0
Young Boys	Total		50	1	4	0	0	0	18	0	0	0	72	1
Paris FC	2022–23	Ligue 2	32	0	2	0	—		—		—		34	0
Angers	2023–24	Ligue 2	37	0	1	0	—		—		—		38	0
Career total			256	4	18	0	7	0	18	0	0	0	299	4

=== International ===
As of match played 27 March 2026

National team	Year	Apps	Goals
Mauritania
Mauritania	2026	1	1
Total		1	1

Scores and results list Mauritania goal tally first, score column indicates score after each Lefort goal

List of international goals scored by Jordan Lefort
No.	Date	Venue	Opponent	Score	Result	Competition
1	27 March 2026	La Bombonera, Buenos Aires, Argentina	Argentina	1–2	1–2	Friendly
