= Vincent Sierro =

Swiss footballer (born 1995)

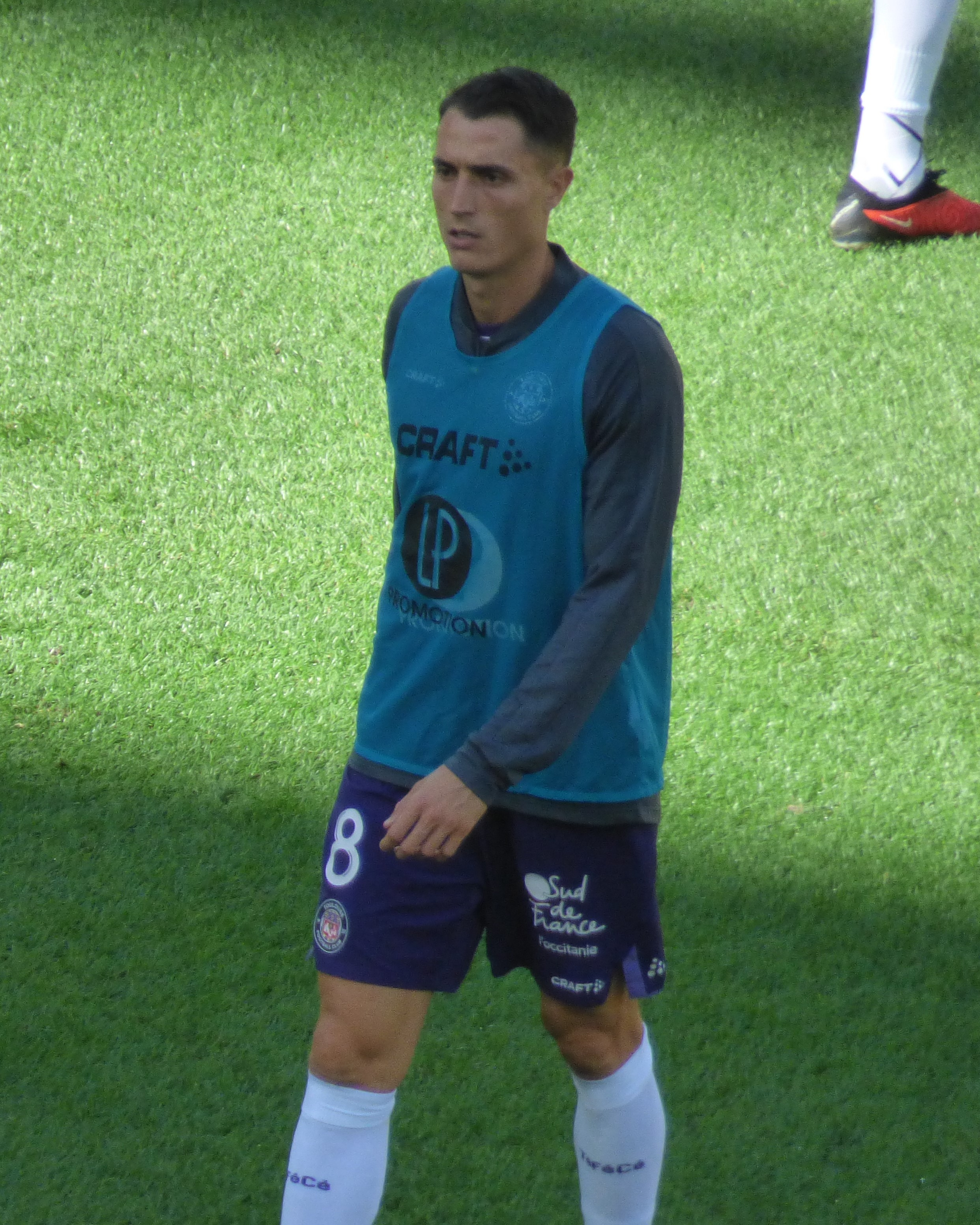
- Sierro warming up for Toulouse in 2023

Personal information
- Full name: Vincent Olivier Sierro
- Date of birth: 8 October 1995 (age 31)
- Place of birth: Sion, Switzerland
- Height: 1.85 m (6 ft 1 in)
- Position: Midfielder

Team information
- Current team: Parma
- Number: 4

Youth career
- Sion

Senior career*
Years	Team	Apps	(Gls)
2015–2017	Sion	34	(4)
2017–2019	SC Freiburg	4	(0)
2018–2019	→ St. Gallen (loan)	35	(11)
2019–2023	Young Boys	82	(7)
2023–2025	Toulouse	74	(11)
2025–2026	Al-Shabab	26	(0)
2026–	Parma	8	(1)

International career^{‡}
2015–2016	Switzerland U20	4	(0)
2024–	Switzerland	17	(1)
- * Club domestic league appearances and goals as of 09:51, 8 November 2026 (UTC) ‡ National team caps and goals as of 7 October 2026

Vincent Olivier Sierro (born 8 October 1995) is a Swiss professional footballer who plays as a midfielder for Serie A club Parma and the Switzerland national team.

== Early life ==
Sierro was born in Sion, in the canton of Valais in the southwest of Switzerland. He is the son of former Valais State Councillor Serge Sierro.

His father having played for Sierre and the Valais regional squad, and his grandfather amongst the founders of FC Crans-Montana, Sierro grew up in a footballing family. Sierro joined the academy of FC Sion, in his hometown, in his youth.

== Club career ==
Sierro began his senior career in the Swiss third division with the FC Sion B team during the 2013–2014 season. He made his debut with the FC Sion first team during the 2014–15 season. He scored his first goal on the 10 April 2016 against FC Thun.

In January 2017, Sierro signed for SC Freiburg on a four-year contract. He did not find success at the club, and returned to Switzerland for the 2018–19 season, joining St. Gallen on loan.

In June 2019, Sierro signed a four-year contract with Young Boys.

In January 2023, Sierro signed for Ligue 1 club Toulouse. Sierro was named club captain ahead of the 2023–24 season.

On 19 August 2025, Sierro joined Saudi Pro League club Al-Shabab on a two-year deal.

== International career ==
In March 2024, Sierro received his first call up to the Swiss national team at the age of 28. On 26 March, Siero debuted in a friendly match against the Republic of Ireland, playing 65 minutes alongside captain Granit Xhaka in midfield before being replaced for Denis Zakaria.

Sierro was included in Switzerland's preliminary squad ahead of the UEFA Euro 2024 on 17 May. He was named in the final 26-man squad on 7 June. In said tournament on 15 June, Sierro appeared as an 86th-minute substitute for Remo Freuler in Switzerland's opening Group A fixture against Hungary.

== Career statistics ==
=== Club ===
As of match played 12 May 2024

Appearances and goals by club, season and competition
Club	Season	League			Cup		Continental		Other		Total	
Club	Season	Division	Apps	Goals	Apps	Goals	Apps	Goals	Apps	Goals	Apps	Goals
Sion	2014–15	Swiss Super League	1	0	—		—		—		1	0
Sion	2015–16	Swiss Super League	16	2	1	0	0	0	—		17	2
Sion	2016–17	Swiss Super League	17	2	3	0	—		—		20	2
Sion	Total		34	4	4	0	0	0	—		38	4
SC Freiburg	2017–18	Bundesliga	4	0	1	0	—		—		5	0
St. Gallen (loan)	2018–19	Swiss Super League	35	11	2	2	2	0	—		39	13
Young Boys	2019–20	Swiss Super League	17	1	4	0	3	0	—		24	1
Young Boys	2020–21	Swiss Super League	17	1	1	0	10	0	—		28	1
Young Boys	2021–22	Swiss Super League	33	4	1	1	11	3	—		45	8
Young Boys	2022–23	Swiss Super League	15	1	2	1	4	1	—		21	3
Young Boys	Total		82	7	8	2	28	4	—		118	13
Toulouse	2022–23	Ligue 1	15	0	4	0	—		—		19	0
Toulouse	2023–24	Ligue 1	30	6	2	1	8	0	1	0	36	7
Toulouse	Total		45	6	6	1	8	0	1	0	60	7
Career total			200	28	21	5	38	4	1	0	260	37

== Honours ==
Young Boys

- Swiss Super League: 2019–20
- Swiss Cup: 2019–20

Toulouse

- Coupe de France: 2022–23
