= Guillaume Faivre =

Swiss football goalkeeper (born 1987)

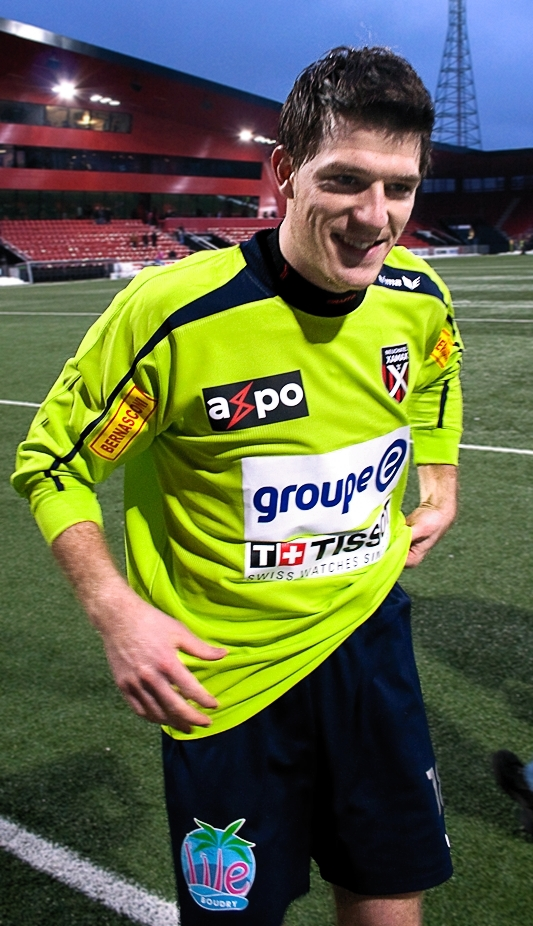
- Faivre in 2013

Personal information
- Date of birth: 20 February 1987 (age 39)
- Place of birth: Bern, Switzerland
- Height: 1.89 m (6 ft 2 in)
- Position: Goalkeeper

Youth career
- –2001: AS Vallée
- 2001–2007: Neuchâtel Xamax

Senior career*
Years	Team	Apps	(Gls)
2007–2012	Neuchâtel Xamax	36	(0)
2010–2011	→ FC Vaduz (loan)	8	(0)
2011–2012	→ FC Wil 1900 (loan)	29	(0)
2012–2020	FC Thun	234	(0)
2020–2022	Young Boys	22	(0)
Total		329	(0)
- * Club domestic league appearances and goals

Guillaume Faivre (born 20 February 1987) is a Swiss former professional football goalkeeper. He played his entire career in Switzerland and is mostly known for his time at FC Thun, before he ended his career at BSC Young Boys in the Swiss Super League on 30 March 2022.
