= Marvin Spielmann =

Swiss footballer (born 1996)

Personal information
- Date of birth: 23 February 1996 (age 30)
- Place of birth: Olten, Switzerland
- Height: 1.81 m (5 ft 11 in)
- Position: Midfielder

Team information
- Current team: Baden
- Number: 23

Youth career
- Aarau

Senior career*
Years	Team	Apps	(Gls)
2013–2015	Baden	39	(18)
2015–2016	Aarau	17	(3)
2016–2017	Wil	19	(2)
2017–2019	Thun	75	(25)
2017	Thun II	1	(0)
2019–2022	Young Boys	40	(4)
2019–2022	Young Boys II	4	(0)
2022–2023	Lausanne-Sport	19	(0)
2022	Lausanne-Sport II	1	(1)
2023	→ Neuchâtel Xamax (loan)	13	(3)
2024–	Baden	13	(1)
- * Club domestic league appearances and goals as of 28 May 2024

Marvin Spielmann (born 23 February 1996) is a Swiss professional footballer who plays as a midfielder for Baden.

== Club career ==
On 12 January 2022, Spielmann signed with Lausanne-Sport. On 9 September 2023, Spielmann's contract with Lausanne-Sport was terminated by mutual consent.

On 2 February 2024, Spielmann returned to Baden until the end of the 2023–24 season.

== Personal life ==
Spielmann was born in Switzerland to a Swiss father and a Congolese mother.

== Honours ==
Thun

- Swiss Cup runner-up: 2018–19

Young Boys

- Swiss Super League: 2019–20
- Swiss Cup: 2019–20
