= Esteban Petignat =

Swiss footballer (born 2000)

Personal information
- Date of birth: 17 May 2000 (age 26)
- Place of birth: Switzerland
- Height: 1.80 m (5 ft 11 in)
- Position: Forward

Team information
- Current team: Bulle
- Number: 19

Youth career
- 2009–2013: Estavayer-le-Lac
- 2013–2015: Fribourg
- 2015–2019: Young Boys

Senior career*
Years	Team	Apps	(Gls)
2018–2022	Young Boys U21	46	(3)
2019–2022	Young Boys	3	(0)
2023–2024	Cham	28	(2)
2024–	Bulle	60	(9)
- * Club domestic league appearances and goals as of 1 October 2026

Esteban Petignat (born 17 May 2000) is a Swiss professional footballer who plays as a forward for Bulle.

== Club career ==
On 14 December 2022, Petignat's contract with Young Boys was terminated by mutual agreement.

On 21 February 2023, Petignat signed a contract with Cham in Swiss Promotion League, on a contract for the rest of the season. In July 2023, he extended the contract by one year.
