= Moussa Camara (goalkeeper) =

Guinean footballer

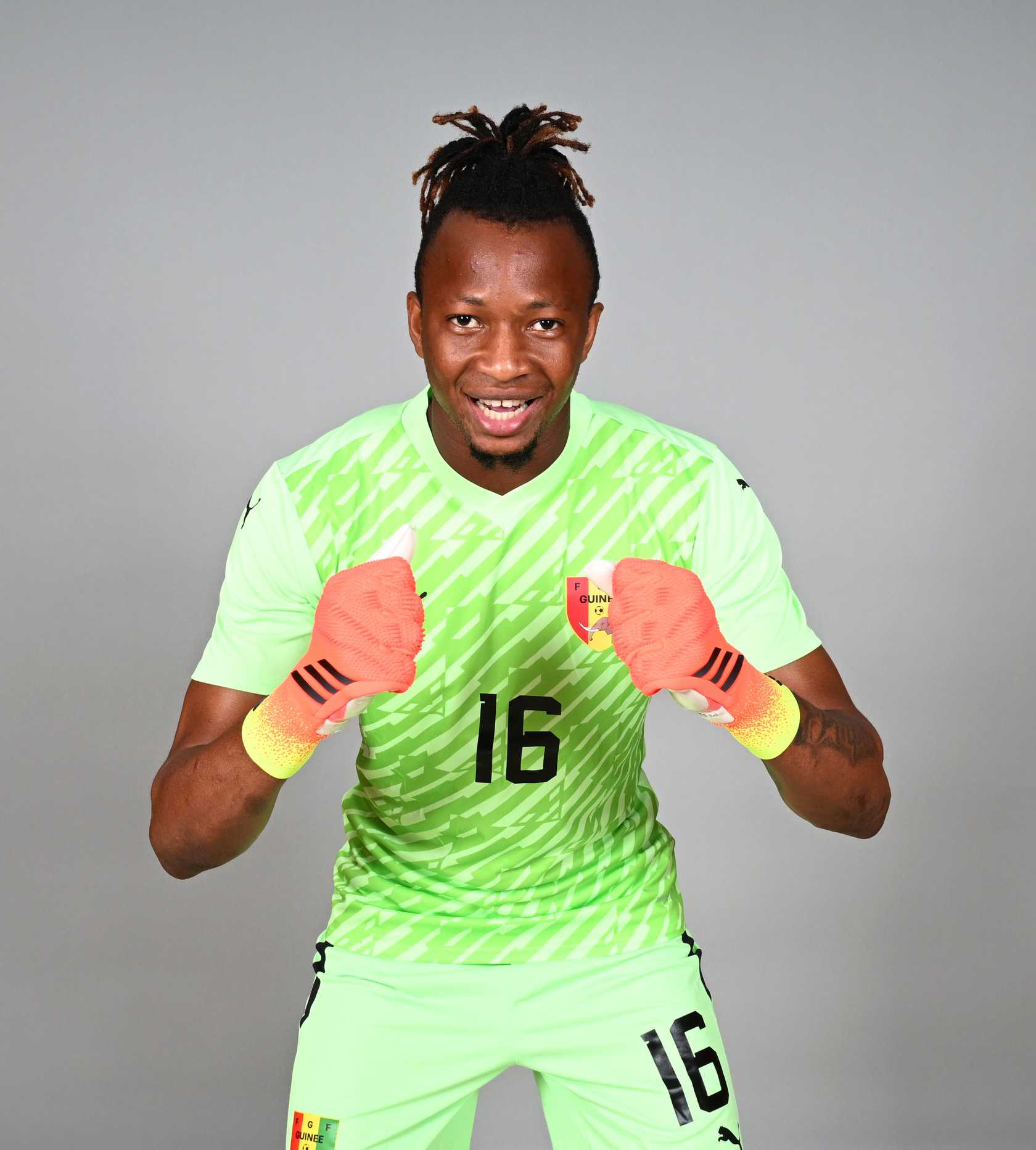

Personal information
- Date of birth: 27 November 1998 (age 27)
- Place of birth: Siguiri, Guinea
- Height: 1.85 m (6 ft 1 in)
- Position: Goalkeeper

Team information
- Current team: Simba SC

Youth career
- FC Kolombada

Senior career*
Years	Team	Apps	(Gls)
2014–2015	Milo FC		
2015–2024	Horoya		
2024–	Simba SC	29	(0)

International career^{‡}
2015	Guinea U17		
- Guinea U20
2018–	Guinea U23	6	(0)
2017–	Guinea	28	(0)
- * Club domestic league appearances and goals as of 23:54, 29 July 2026 (UTC) ‡ National team caps and goals as of 22:01, 8 October 2025 (UTC)

Moussa Camara (born 27 November 1998) is a Guinean professional footballer who plays as a goalkeeper for Simba SC and the Guinea national team.

== Club career ==
Camara played with FC Kolombada in the lower divisions before moving to second-tier club Milo FC. He joined Horoya AC in 2015, serving as backup to the veteran Khadim N'Diaye. He also got to train under goalkeeper coach Kémoko Camara.

After injuries to N'Diaye and Germain Berthé, he made his continental debut in the 2018–19 CAF Champions League against eventual champions ES Tunis, impressing despite conceding two goals in the loss.

== International career ==
At youth level, Camara has been capped at the under-17, under-20 and under-23 levels. He was first called up to the U17s by manager Hamidou Camara, and was his first-choice keeper at the 2015 African U-17 Championship and the 2015 FIFA U-17 World Cup. Two years later he represented his country at the 2017 Africa U-20 Cup of Nations and the 2017 FIFA U-20 World Cup. He also played all six matches for the Guinea U23s during 2019 Africa U-23 Cup of Nations qualification. In the first leg of their third round matchup against Ivory Coast, he saved a penalty in the 83rd minute to preserve a 1–0 win in Abidjan.

He made his senior debut for Guinea on 15 July 2017, appearing between the sticks in their 3–1 win over Guinea-Bissau during 2018 African Nations Championship qualification. In May 2019 he was pre-selected for the 2019 Africa Cup of Nations, but did not make the final squad. Later that year he was called up for the 2021 Africa Cup of Nations qualification, playing in both Group A matches against Mali and Namibia before the tournament was postponed due to the COVID-19 pandemic. He later cited Naby Keïta as a teammate he learned a lot from.

== Career statistics ==
As of match played 8 September 2025

Appearances and goals by national team and year
National team	Year	Apps	Goals
Guinea	2017	3	0
Guinea	2018	0	0
Guinea	2019	4	0
Guinea	2020	0	0
Guinea	2021	11	0
Guinea	2022	2	0
Guinea	2023	1	0
Guinea	2024	5	0
Guinea	2025	2	0
Total		21	0

== Honours ==
Horoya AC

- Guinée Championnat National: 2015–16, 2016–17, 2017–18, 2018–19
- Guinée Coupe Nationale: 2016, 2018, 2019
- Guinée Super Coupe: 2017, 2018
