= 2022–23 Guinée Championnat National =

Guinée Championnat National
- Season: 2022–23
- Champions: Hafia FC
- Champions League: Hafia FC; Horoya AC
- Top goalscorer: Seydouba Bangoura (18 goals)

The 2022—23 Guinée Championnat National season, colloquially called Ligue 1 Prio, was the 56th edition of top-tier Guinée Championnat National football competition under the authority of the Guinean Football Federation in Guinea.

Hafia FC successfully defended its 16th title in 2023 after a hiatus since 1985, defeating in the 2023 final Flamme Olympique, 3–1. Runners up Horoya AC also won on the final match day, defeating Séquence 5–1, but finished a single point behind. Horoya started the season well and were six points ahead of Hafia after the fourth round of matches, and five points clear at the half-way mark of the season, but Hafia replaced their coach after the fourth round, hiring Polish manager Casimir Jagiello who steered the club through seven consecutive wins. Hafia and Horoya then drew 1–1 in a game which featured altercations between the two clubs in extra time. The draw meant Hafia could clinch the championship with a win on the final match day.

Fello Star was relegated with one game to play, joined by bottom team Satellite.

== League Table ==
Pos	Team	Pld	W	D	L	GF	GA	GD	Pts	Qualification or relegation
1	Hafia FC (C)	26	15	5	6	45	26	+19	50	Champions; Qualification to the 2023–24 CAF Champions League
2	Horoya AC	26	15	4	7	39	15	+24	49	Qualification to the 2023–24 CAF Champions League
3	Milo FC	26	12	6	8	33	32	+1	42	Qualification to the 2023–24 CAF Confederation Cup
4	Académie SOAR	26	11	5	10	30	23	+7	38	Qualification to the 2023–24 CAF Confederation Cup
5	CI Kamsar	26	12	2	12	26	32	−6	38	
6	Flamme Olympique	26	9	9	8	35	24	+11	36	
7	Renaissance FC	26	9	9	8	25	30	−5	36	
8	ASM Sangarédi	26	10	5	11	29	33	−4	35	
9	Wakriya AC	26	9	7	10	22	23	−1	34	
10	AS Kaloum	26	7	12	7	24	23	+1	33	
11	Ashanti	26	9	5	12	28	34	−6	32	
12	Séquence FC	26	9	4	13	28	41	−13	31	
13	Fello Star (R)	26	5	12	9	25	31	−6	27	Relegation
14	Satellite (R)	26	4	7	15	20	42	−22	19	Relegation

Source: Soccerway
Rules for classification: 1) points; 2) goal difference; 3) number of goals scored.
(C) Champions; (R) Relegated
