= Abdoulaye Paye Camara =

Guinean footballer

Personal information
- Date of birth: 20 December 1995 (age 30)
- Place of birth: Conakry, Guinea
- Height: 1.76 m (5 ft 9 in)
- Position: Midfielder

Team information
- Current team: Horoya AC

Senior career*
Years	Team	Apps	(Gls)
2012–2015	Séquence de Dixinn		
2015–2020	Horoya AC		
2020–2022	Paris 13 Atletico	5	(0)
2022–	Horoya AC		

International career^{‡}
2013–	Guinea	3	(0)
- * Club domestic league appearances and goals ‡ National team caps and goals as of 7 June 2019

Abdoulaye Paye Camara (born 20 December 1995) is a Guinean professional footballer who plays as a midfielder for Guinée Championnat National club Horoya AC.

== Club career ==
Born in Conakry, Camara has played club football for Séquence de Dixinn, Horoya AC, and Paris 13 Atletico.

== International career ==
Camara made his international debut for Guinea in 2013.

== Honours ==
Horoya AC

- Guinée Championnat National: 2015–16, 2016–17, 2017–18, 2018–19
