= Mohamed Ali Camara =

Guinean footballer (born 1997)

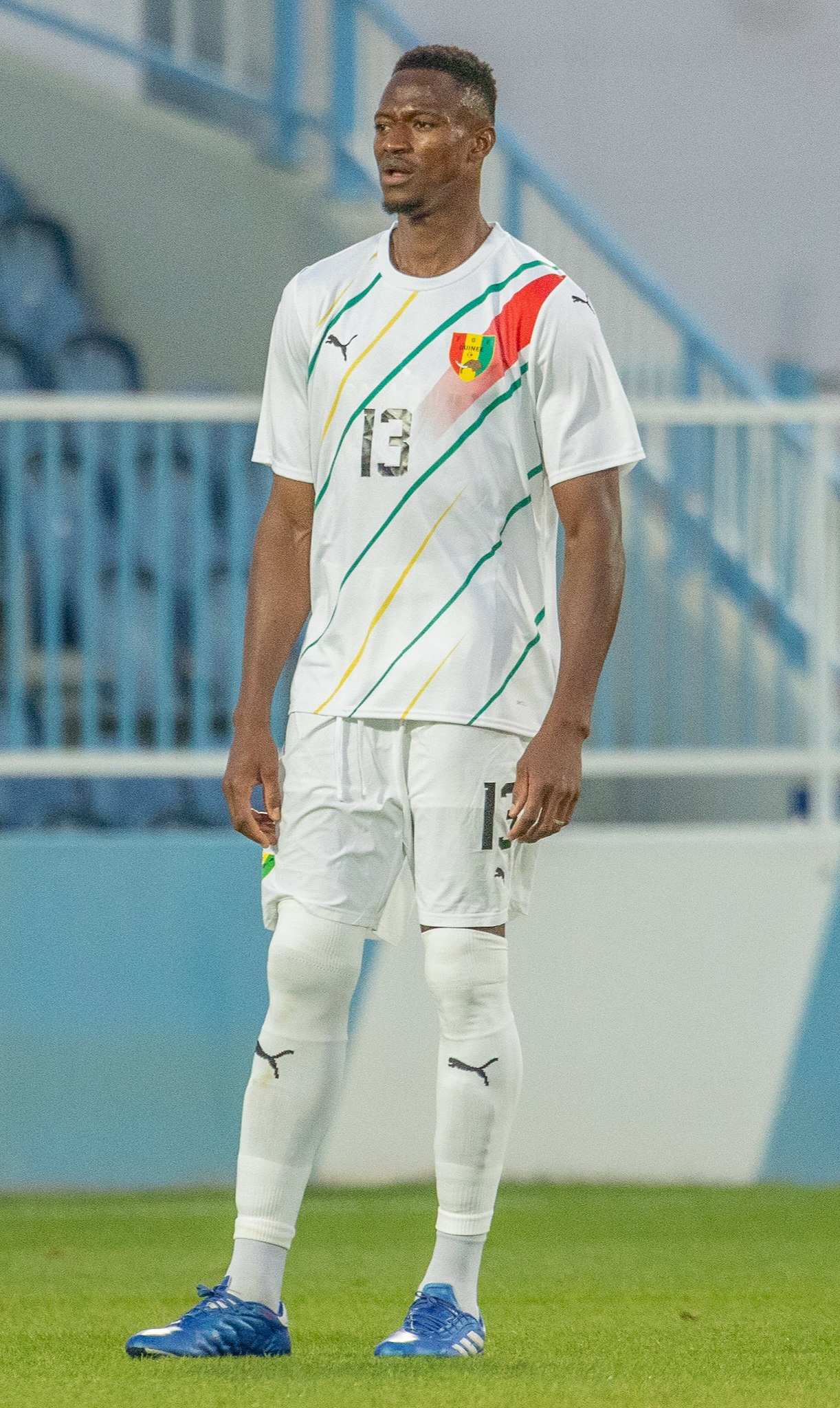
- Camara with Guinea in 2024

Personal information
- Full name: Mohamed Ali Camara
- Date of birth: 28 August 1997 (age 29)
- Place of birth: Kérouané, Guinea
- Height: 1.93 m (6 ft 4 in)
- Position: Centre-back

Team information
- Current team: Maccabi Tel Aviv
- Number: 5

Senior career*
| Years | Team | Apps | (Gls) |
| 2014–2016 | Satellite | | |
| 2016–2017 | Horoya | | |
| 2017 | → Hafia (loan) | | |
| 2017–2018 | Hapoel Ra'anana | 29 | (3) |
| 2018–2025 | Young Boys | 133 | (5) |
| 2025– | Maccabi Tel Aviv | 26 | (1) |

International career^{‡}
| 2017 | Guinea U20 | 8 | (1) |
| 2018– | Guinea | 27 | (0) |
- * Club domestic league appearances and goals as of 23 June 2026 ‡ National team caps and goals as of 20:16, 6 November 2025 (UTC)

Mohamed Ali Camara, also spelt Mohamed Aly Camara, (born 28 August 1997) is a Guinean professional footballer who plays as a centre-back for Israeli Premier League club Maccabi Tel Aviv and the Guinea national team. Camara is nicknamed Piqué, named after his footballing idol Gerard Piqué.

== Club career ==
=== Early career in Guinea ===
Camara began his professional career in his native Guinea with Satellite FC in January 2015.

He then transferred to Horoya AC, also in Guinea, on 26 February 2016. He made an appearance for Horoya in the CAF Champions League first round second leg against ZESCO United on 20 March 2016 in which he scored two penalty kicks to win the match 2–0. He won the treble with Horoya in 2016: Guinée Championnat National, Guineé Coupe Nationale, and Guinean Super Cup.

==== Loan to Hafia ====
He then joined Hafia on a five-month loan deal from Horoya on 23 January 2017.

Because he played the 2–1 victory against Renaissance Conakry on 9 July 2017 in the first round, this allowed him to still be credited as winning the Guinée Coupe Nationale in 2017 dspite leaving the club two months before the final.

=== Hapoel Ra'anana ===
Camara signed a five-year contract with Hapoel Ra'anana on 14 July 2017. He made his professional debut for Ra'anana in a 0–0 Israeli Premier League tie with Hapoel Ironi Kiryat Shmona F.C. on 19 August 2017.

=== BSC Young Boys ===
After a successful season, Camara joined BSC Young Boys on 6 July 2018, agreeing a contract until 2022. He became club captain, and in November 2023 notably approached opponent Erling Haaland at half-time to ask for his shirt.

=== Maccabi Tel Aviv ===
In July 2025 Camara came back to Israel to join Israeli powerhouse Maccabi Tel Aviv on a deal valid until 2028 with an option to extend until 2029.

He was injured in the 2–0 loss against Aston Villa on 6 November 2025 in the UEFA Europa League.

== International career ==
Camara represented the Guinea U20s at the 2017 FIFA U-20 World Cup, and the 2017 Africa U-20 Cup of Nations.

Camara made his international debut for the senior Guinea national team in a friendly 2–0 loss to Mauritania on 24 March 2018.

In January 2022, he was selected by the coach Kaba Diawara to participate in the 2021 Africa Cup of Nations in Cameroon. On 23 December 2023, he was again included in the list of 25 players selected for the 2023 Africa Cup of Nations.

== Career statistics ==
=== Club ===
As of 6 November 2025

Appearances and goals by club, season and competition
| Club | Season | League | | | Cup (Note: Includes Guinée Coupe Nationale, Israel State Cup, and Swiss Cup) | | Continental | | Other | | Total | |
| Club | Season | Division | Apps | Goals | Apps | Goals | Apps | Goals | Apps | Goals | Apps | Goals |
|---|---|---|---|---|---|---|---|---|---|---|---|---|
| Horoya | 2015–16 | Guinée Championnat National | ? | ? | ? | ? | 1 (Note: Appearance in CAF Champions League) | 2 | ? | ? | 1+ | 2+ |
| Horoya | 2016–17 | Guinée Championnat National | ? | ? | ? | ? | 0 | 0 | 0 | 0 | ? | ? |
| Hafia (loan) | 2016–17 | Guinée Championnat National | ? | ? | 1 | 0 | 0 | 0 | 0 | 0 | 1+ | 0+ |
| Hapoel Ra'anana | 2017–18 | Israeli Premier League | 29 | 2 | 5 | 1 | — | | — | | 34 | 3 |
| Young Boys | 2018–19 | Swiss Super League | 14 | 2 | 4 | 1 | 4 (Note: Appearances in UEFA Champions League) | 0 | — | | 22 | 3 |
| Young Boys | 2019–20 | Swiss Super League | 9 | 1 | 2 | 0 | — | | — | | 11 | 1 |
| Young Boys | 2020–21 | Swiss Super League | 29 | 0 | 1 | 0 | 9 (Note: Two appearances in UEFA Champions League, seven appearances in UEFA Europa League) | 0 | — | | 39 | 0 |
| Young Boys | 2021–22 | Swiss Super League | 22 | 2 | 2 | 0 | 10 | 0 | — | | 34 | 2 |
| Young Boys | 2022–23 | Swiss Super League | 12 | 0 | 2 | 0 | 5 (Note: Appearances in UEFA Europa Conference League) | 0 | — | | 19 | 0 |
| Young Boys | 2023–24 | Swiss Super League | 29 | 0 | 3 | 0 | 8 (Note: Seven appearances in UEFA Champions League, one appearance in UEFA Europa League) | 0 | — | | 40 | 0 |
| Young Boys | 2024–25 | Swiss Super League | 18 | 0 | 2 | 0 | 8 | 0 | — | | 28 | 0 |
| Young Boys | Total | | 133 | 5 | 16 | 1 | 44 | 0 | 0 | 0 | 193 | 6 |
| Maccabi Tel Aviv | 2025–26 | Israeli Premier League | 7 | 1 | 0 | 0 | 9 (Note: Two appearances in UEFA Champions League, four appearances in UEFA Europa League) | 0 | — | | 16 | 1 |
| Career total | | | 171 | 8 | 22 | 2 | 46 | 2 | 0 | 0 | 245 | 12 |

=== International ===
As of match played 14 October 2025

Appearances and goals by national team and year
| National team | Year | Apps | Goals |
|---|---|---|---|
| Guinea | 2018 | 1 | 0 |
| Guinea | 2019 | 1 | 0 |
| Guinea | 2020 | 1 | 0 |
| Guinea | 2021 | 7 | 0 |
| Guinea | 2022 | 9 | 0 |
| Guinea | 2023 | 2 | 0 |
| Guinea | 2024 | 3 | 0 |
| Guinea | 2025 | 3 | 0 |
| Total | | 27 | 0 |

== Honours ==
Horoya AC

- Guinée Championnat National: 2015–16
- Guinée Coupe Nationale: 2016
- Guinean Super Cup: 2016

Hafia

- Guinée Coupe Nationale: 2017

BSC Young Boys

- Swiss Super League: 2018–19, 2019–20, 2020–21, 2022–23
- Swiss Cup: 2019–20, 2022–23
