= 2018–19 Guinée Championnat National =

Ligue 1 Pro
- Season: 2018–19
- Champions: CI Kamsar
- Top goalscorer: Yakhouba Gnagna Barry (17 goals)

The 2018–19 Guinée Championnat National season, colloquially called Ligue 1 Prio, was the 53rd season of top-tier Guinée Championnat National football competition under the authority of the Guinean Football Federation in Guinea. The season started on 13 December 2018. 14 teams contested.

Horoya AC unsuccessfully defended its 2018 title. CI Kamsar successfully pursued its 2019 title.

== League table ==
Pos	Team	Pld	W	D	L	GF	GA	GD	Pts	Qualification or relegation
1	Horoya AC (C)	26	19	3	4	49	17	+32	60	Qualification for Champions League
2	Hafia FC (Q)	26	12	8	6	36	25	+11	44	Qualification for Champions League
3	Santoba FC (Q)	26	10	11	5	35	31	+4	41	Qualification for Confederation Cup
4	CO Coyah	26	9	13	4	35	26	+9	40	
5	Wakriya AC	26	9	11	6	24	17	+7	38	
6	Kaloum Star	26	7	15	4	26	23	+3	36	
7	CI Kamsar (Q)	26	7	10	9	27	30	−3	31	Qualification for Confederation Cup (Note: CI Kamsar are Guinée Coupe Nationale runners-up (Horoya AC are cup winners).)
8	ASFAG	26	8	7	11	27	33	−6	31	
9	Fello Star	26	8	6	12	25	33	−8	30	
10	Ashanti Golden Boys	26	6	11	9	18	20	−2	29	
11	Eléphant de Coléah	26	6	10	10	31	39	−8	28	
12	Satellite FC	26	7	7	12	27	37	−10	28	
13	Renaissance FC (R)	26	5	9	12	29	41	−12	24	Relegation
14	Gangan FC (R)	26	4	9	13	21	38	−17	21	Relegation

Source: legranddebatdufoot.com
(C) Champions; (Q) Qualified for the phase indicated; (R) Relegated

== Stadiums ==
Team	Location	Stadium	Capacity
Horoya AC	Conakry	Stade du 28 Septembre	25,000
Hafia FC	Conakry	Stade Petit Sory	5,400
Santoba FC	Conakry	Stade de Coléah	5,000
CO Coyah	Conakry	Stade du 28 Septembre	25,000
Wakriya AC			
AS Kaloum Star	Conakry	Stade de la Mission	1,000
CI Kamsar	Kamsar	Stade de l'Amitié	2,000
ASFAG	Conakry	Stade du 28 Septembre	25,000
Fello Star	Labé	Stade Régional Saifoullaye Diallo	5,000
AS Ashanti Golden Boys	Siguiri	Stade Kankou Moussa	3,000
Eléphant de Coléah			
Satellite FC	Conakry	Stade du 28 Septembre	25,000
Renaissance FC			
Gangan FC	Kindia	Stade de Kindia	2,500

== Attendances ==
#	Football club	Average attendance
1	Horoya AC	1,867
2	Hafia FC	952
3	AS Kaloum Star	742
4	Fello Star	421
5	Santoba FC	367
6	ASFAG	314
7	CO Coyah	281
8	Satellite FC	267
9	Wakriya AC	233
10	CI Kamsar	216
11	Ashanti Golden Boys	198
12	Eléphant de Coléah	175
13	Renaissance FC	142
14	Gangan FC	121
