= 2016–17 Guinée Championnat National =

Guinée Championnat National
- Season: 2016–17
- Champions: Horoya AC

The 2016–17 Guinée Championnat National season was the 50th edition of top level of Guinée Championnat National football competition under the authority of Guinean Football Federation in Guinea. It began on 16 December 2016 and concluded on 8 June 2017.

Horoya AC successfully defended its 2016 title and pursued its 2017 title.

== Standings ==
Pos	Team	Pld	W	D	L	GF	GA	GD	Pts	Qualification or relegation
1	Horoya AC	26	22	3	1	61	6	+55	69	2018 CAF Champions League
2	Wakriya AC	26	12	10	4	28	18	+10	46	
3	ASFAG	26	12	7	7	26	21	+5	43	
4	Hafia FC	26	11	8	7	34	25	+9	41	
5	Satellite FC	26	10	6	10	27	31	−4	36	
6	Renaissance FC	26	9	7	10	30	30	0	34	
7	Ashanti Golden Boys	26	8	9	9	24	25	−1	33	
8	Fello Star	26	7	9	10	19	30	−11	30	
9	Kaloum Star	26	5	14	7	21	19	+2	29	
10	Gangan FC	26	7	8	11	23	27	−4	29	
11	CI Kamsar	26	6	11	9	24	29	−5	29	
12	Athlético de Coléah	26	7	7	12	26	33	−7	28	
13	Soumba FC	26	7	5	14	17	38	−21	26	Relegated
14	CO Coyah	26	6	2	18	14	42	−28	20	Relegated

Source: Rsssf.com Soccerway
Rules for classification: 1) points; 2) goal difference; 3) number of goals scored.
