= 2015–16 Guinée Championnat National =

Guinée Championnat National
- Season: 2015–16

The 2015–16 Guinée Championnat National season was the 49th edition of top level Guinée Championnat National football competition under the authority of Guinean Football Federation in Guinea. It began on 11 December 2015 and concluded on 27 July 2016.

Horoya AC successfully pursued its 2016 title.

== Teams ==
Twelve teams participated this season. Half of those sides played their home matches in Conakry at Stade du 28 Septembre. ASFAG and Flamme Olympique FC were promoted from the Championnat National de Ligue 2.

=== Stadia and locations ===
Locations of the 2015–16 Guinée Championnat National teams

Team	Stadium	Location	Capacity
ASFAG	Stade du 28 Septembre	Conakry	25,000
Ashanti Golden Boys	Stade de Coléah	Conakry	5,000
Athlético de Coléah	Stade du 28 Septembre	Conakry	25,000
Fello Star	Stade Régional Saifoullaye Diallo	Labé	5,000
Flamme Olympique	Stade du 28 Septembre	Conakry	25,000
Gangan	Stade de Kindia	Kindia	2,500
Hafia	Stade du 28 Septembre	Conakry	25,000
Horoya	Stade du 28 Septembre	Conakry	25,000
Kaloum Star	Stade du 28 Septembre	Conakry	25,000
Kamsar	Stade de l'Amitié	Port Kamsar	2,000
Satellite	Stade du 28 Septembre	Conakry	25,000
Soumba	Stade Negueya	Dubréka	1,000

== League table ==
Pos	Team	Pld	W	D	L	GF	GA	GD	Pts	Qualification or relegation
1	Horoya AC	22	15	5	2	40	9	+31	50	Qualification to the 2017 CAF Champions League preliminary round
2	Kaloum Star	22	13	5	4	33	19	+14	44	
3	Fello Star	22	12	7	3	31	17	+14	43	
4	Hafia FC	22	10	10	2	29	11	+18	40	
5	Soumba FC	22	7	8	7	21	25	−4	29	
6	CI Kamsar	22	7	4	11	19	21	−2	25	
7	ASFAG	22	5	8	9	22	27	−5	23	
8	Gangan FC	22	5	8	9	15	24	−9	23	
9	Athlético de Coléah	22	6	4	12	17	32	−15	22	
10	Satellite FC	22	4	9	9	14	26	−12	21	
11	Ashanti Golden Boys	22	6	3	13	17	30	−13	21	Relegation to 2016–17 Guinée Championnat National de Ligue 2
12	Flamme Olympique	22	2	9	11	12	29	−17	15	Relegation to 2016–17 Guinée Championnat National de Ligue 2

Updated to match(es) played on 27 July 2016. Source: Soccerway
Rules for classification: 1) points; 2) goal difference; 3) number of goals scored.
