= 2017–18 Guinée Championnat National =

Guinée Championnat National
- Season: 2017–18
- Champions: Horoya AC

The 2017–18 Guinée Championnat National season was the 51st edition of the top level of Guinée Championnat National football competition since its founding in 1965 under the authority of Guinean Football Federation in Guinea. It began on 3 November 2017 and ended on 7 June 2018.

Horoya AC successfully defended its 2017 title and successfully pursued its 2018 title.

== Standings ==
Pos	Team	Pld	W	D	L	GF	GA	GD	Pts	Qualification or relegation
1	Horoya AC	26	19	5	2	56	14	+42	62	Qualification to the 2018–19 CAF Champions League
2	Hafia FC	26	15	6	5	44	23	+21	51	
3	Wakriya AC	26	10	12	4	41	30	+11	42	
4	Kaloum Star	26	11	7	8	24	21	+3	40	
5	Gangan FC	26	10	8	8	31	25	+6	38	
6	Eléphant de Coléah	26	8	8	10	22	30	−8	32	
7	Fello Star	26	9	5	12	27	32	−5	32	
8	ASFAG	26	7	10	9	23	23	0	31	
9	Ashanti Golden Boys	26	7	9	10	20	35	−15	30	
10	CI Kamsar	26	7	8	11	25	33	−8	29	
11	Renaissance FC	26	7	7	12	26	36	−10	28	
12	Satellite FC	26	7	7	12	17	31	−14	28	
13	Milo FC	26	6	9	11	24	29	−5	27	Relegation to 2018–19 regional leagues
14	Athlético de Coléah	26	3	11	12	17	35	−18	20	Relegation to 2018–19 regional leagues

Source: FIFA
Rules for classification: 1) points; 2) goal difference; 3) number of goals scored.

== See also ==
- 2018 Guinée Coupe Nationale
