= Yakhouba Gnagna Barry =

Guinean footballer

Personal information
- Date of birth: 17 April 1998 (age 28)
- Place of birth: Conakry, Guinea
- Height: 1.87 m (6 ft 2 in)
- Position: Forward

Team information
- Current team: Horoya
- Number: 15

Senior career*
Years	Team	Apps	(Gls)
2015–2016	Stade Africain Matoto	7	(13)
2016–2020	Santoba	49+	(58)
2020–2021	→ Horoya (loan)		(14)
2021–	Horoya	26+	(48+)

International career^{‡}
2021–	Guinea	19	(6)
- * Club domestic league appearances and goals as of 14:50, 26 April 2026 (UTC) ‡ National team caps and goals as of 16 November 2026

Yakhouba Gnagna Barry, also known as Yacouba Barry and Yaghouba Gnagna Barry, (born 17 April 1998) is a Guinean footballer who plays as a forward for Horoya and the Guinea national team.

== Club career ==
=== Stade Africain Matoto ===
During the 2015–16 season, Yakhouba Gnagna Barry scored 13 goals in 7 appearances for Stade Africain Matoto.

=== Santoba ===
He joined Santoba in 2016, where he won the 2017–18 Guinée Championnat National Ligue 2 title, and was Ligue 1 Pro top scorer with 17 goals in 2018–19.

=== Horoya ===
He joined Horoya initially on loan on 23 August 2020 and he scored 14 goals during the loan deal. He joined permanently in September 2021, and he was Ligue 1 Pro top scorer again with 17 goals during 2021–22, joint with Ousmane Condé.

He was on the verge of joining South African Premiership club AmaZulu in September 2023 but the move fell through after Barry failed his medical with a knee injury.

==== 2025–26 season ====
Barry scored his first goal of the season during the 2–0 victory against Al Hilal Benghazi on 27 September 2025 during the CAF Champions League first round, and he scored a hat trick against ASM Sangarédi on 5 November 2025.

He scored two goals on 5 December 2025 during the 5–0 victory against Karfamoriah. This brought his total league goals scored in the 2025–26 season to ten goals. He had a failed move to the Algerian Ligue Professionnelle 1 in January 2026.

He scored 20 goals across all competitions as Horoya AC won the 2025–26 Guinée Championnat National title, and was also the league's top goalscorer with 19 goals. He also played every match of the 2025–26 season.

== International career ==
Barry made his debut with the Guinea national team in a 3–0 2020 African Nations Championship qualification win over Namibia on 19 January 2021 in which he scored a brace.

After a three year absence, he returned to the Guinea national team for the 2024 African Nations Championship in August 2025. He was called up again ahead of a pair of friendlies against Togo and Benin in March 2026 but did not feature in either match.

== Career statistics ==
=== Club ===
As of match played 25 April 2026

Appearances and goals by club, season and competition
Club	Season	League			Guinée Coupe Nationale		CAF Champions League		Total	
Club	Season	Division	Apps	Goals	Apps	Goals	Apps	Goals	Apps	Goals
Stade Africain Matoto	2015–16	Guinée Ligue Regionale	7	13	0	0	—		7	13
Santoba	2016–17	Guinée Championnat National Ligue 2	10	6	?	?	—		10+	6+
Santoba	2017–18	Guinée Championnat National Ligue 2	26	19	?	?	—		26+	19+
Santoba	2018–19	Guinée Championnat National	?	17	?	?	—		?	17+
Santoba	2019–20	Guinée Championnat National	13	10	?	?	—		13+	10+
Santoba	2020–21	Guinée Championnat National	0	0	—		0	0	0	0
Horoya (loan)	2020–21	Guinée Championnat National	?	14	—		8	2	8+	16
Horoya (loan)	Total		56+	85	?	?	8	2	64+	87
Horoya	2021–22	Guinée Championnat National	?	17	—		7	1	7+	18
Horoya	2022–23	Guinée Championnat National	?	?	—		4	1	4+	1+
Horoya	2023–24	Guinée Championnat National	?	8	—		2	0	2+	8
Horoya	2024–25	Guinée Championnat National	?	7	—		—		?	7
Horoya	2025–26	Guinée Championnat National	26	19	—		3	1	29	20
Career total			82+	130+	?	?	24	5	111+	135+

=== International ===
As of match played 16 November 2026.

Appearances and goals by national team and year
National team	Year	Apps	Goals
Guinea	2021	9	3
Guinea	2022	4	0
Guinea	2023	0	0
Guinea	2024	0	0
Guinea	2025	4	0
Guinea	2026	2	3
Total		19	6

As of match played 16 November 2026
Scores and results list Guinea's goal tally first, score column indicates score after each Barry goal

List of international goals scored by Yakhouba Gnagna Barry
No.	Date	Venue	Cap	Opponent	Score	Result	Competition
1	19 January 2021	Limbe Stadium, Limbé, Cameroon	1	Namibia	1–0	3–0	2020 African Nations Championship
2	19 January 2021	Limbe Stadium, Limbé, Cameroon	1	Namibia	3–0	3–0	2020 African Nations Championship
3	27 January 2021	Reunification Stadium, Douala, Cameroon	3	Tanzania	1–0	2–2	2020 African Nations Championship
4	12 November 2026	28 September Stadium, Conakry, Guinea	18	Eritrea	2–0	2–1	2027 Africa Cup of Nations qualification
5	16 November 2026	Al Salam Stadium, Cairo, Egypt	19	Eritrea	2–0	3–1	2027 Africa Cup of Nations qualification
6	16 November 2026	Al Salam Stadium, Cairo, Egypt	19	Eritrea	3–0	3–1	2027 Africa Cup of Nations qualification

== Honours ==
Santoba

- Guinée Championnat National: third place 2018–19
- Guinée Championnat National Ligue 2: 2017–18

Horoya

- Guinée Championnat National: 2020–21, 2021–22, 2024–25, 2025–26; runners-up 2022–23
- Guinean Super Cup: 2022

Guinea

- African Nations Championship: third place 2020

Individual

- Guinée Championnat National top goalscorer: 2018–19, 2021–22, (Note: Joint with Ousmane Condé (Milo).) 2025–26
