= Mohamed Bangoura (footballer, born 1996) =

Guinean footballer

Personal information
- Full name: Mohamed Bangoura
- Date of birth: 14 March 1996 (age 30)
- Place of birth: Conakry, Guinea
- Height: 1.75 m (5 ft 9 in)
- Position: Left-back

Team information
- Current team: Kamsar

Senior career*
Years	Team	Apps	(Gls)
2013–2014	Satellite		
2014–2016	Horoya		
2016–2017	Kaloum		
2017–2018	Satellite		
2018–2020	Santoba		
2018–	Kamsar		

International career^{‡}
2018–	Guinea	8	(0)
- * Club domestic league appearances and goals as of 00:11, 26 March 2021 (UTC) ‡ National team caps and goals as of 00:11, 26 March 2021 (UTC)

Mohamed "Yôrôbô" Bangoura (born 14 March 1996) is a Guinean footballer who plays as a left-back for Kamsar and the Guinea national team.

== International career ==
Bangoura made his debut with the Guinea national team in a 2–1 2018 African Nations Championship qualification win over Sudan on 14 January 2018.
