= Ibrahima Sory Doumbouya =

Guinean footballer

Personal information
- Date of birth: 25 March 1996 (age 30)
- Place of birth: Guinea
- Position: Defender

Team information
- Current team: Horoya AC

Senior career*
Years	Team	Apps	(Gls)
2018–2021	Wakriya AC		
2021–	Horoya AC		

International career^{‡}
2019–present	Guinea	8	(0)
- * Club domestic league appearances and goals ‡ National team caps and goals as of 00:07, 17 September 2021 (UTC)

Ibrahima Sory Doumbouya (born 25 March 1996) is a Guinean professional footballer who plays as a defender for Guinée Championnat National club Horoya AC and the Guinea national team.
