= Abdoulaye Sylla (footballer, born 1995) =

Guinean footballer

Personal information
- Date of birth: 2 February 1995 (age 31)
- Place of birth: Kamsar, Guinea
- Position: Goalkeeper

Senior career*
Years	Team	Apps	(Gls)
2013–2014	Horoya AC		
2014–2019	Hafia FC		
2019–2020	Académie SOAR		
2020–2023	CI Kamsar		

International career
2015–2017	Guinea	5	(0)
- * Club domestic league appearances and goals

Abdoulaye Sylla (born 2 February 1995) is a Guinean retired international footballer who played as a goalkeeper.

== Career ==
Born in Kamsar, Sylla played club football for Horoya AC, Hafia FC, Académie SOAR and CI Kamsar.

He made his international debut for Guinea in 2015.
