= 2023–24 CAF Confederation Cup =

International football competition in Africa

2023–24 TotalEnergies CAF Confederation Cup
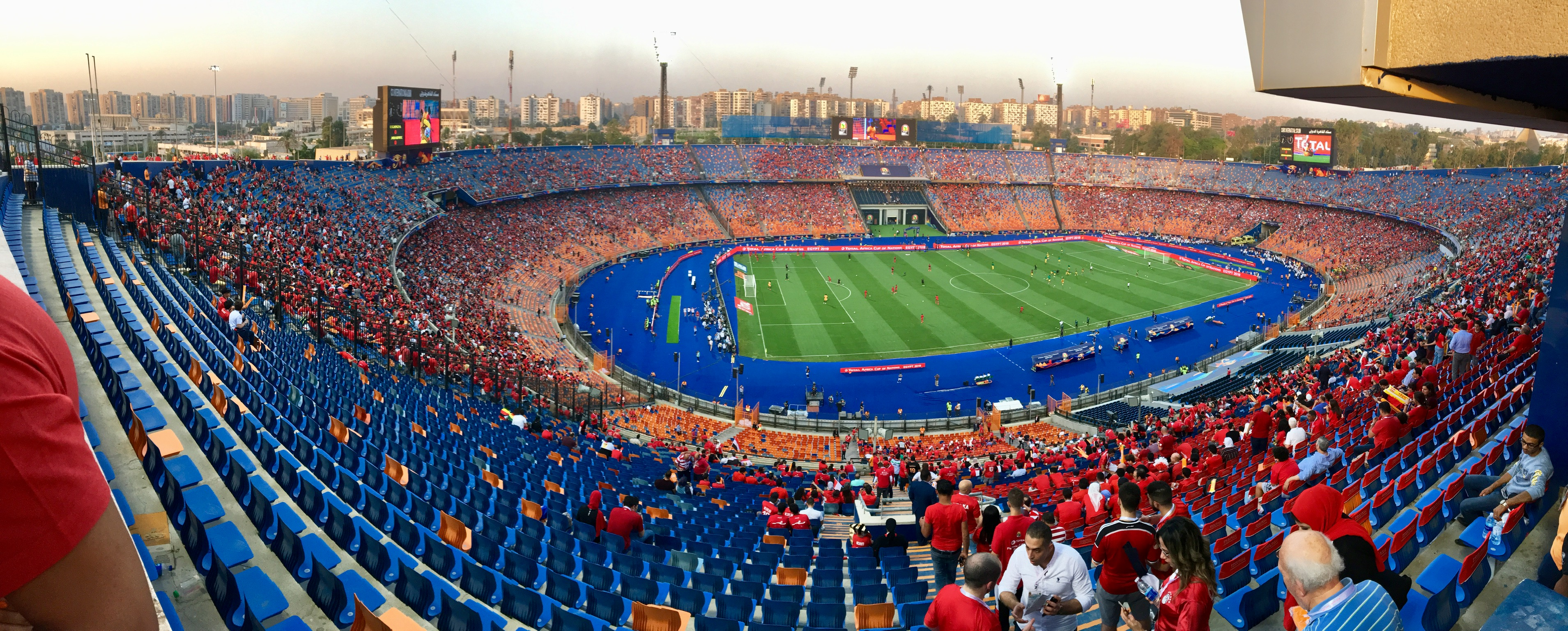
- Cairo International Stadium in Cairo hosted the podium where Zamalek lifted the trophy

Tournament details
- Dates: Qualifying: 18 August – 1 October 2023; Competition proper: 26 November 2023 – 19 May 2024
- Teams: 52 (from 41 associations)

Final positions
- Champions: (Egypt) Zamalek (2nd title)
- Runners-up: (Morocco) RS Berkane

Tournament statistics
- Matches played: 60
- Goals scored: 131 (2.18 per match)
- Top scorer: 4 players (4 goals each)
- (Note: All statistics do not include qualifying play-offs)

The 2023–24 CAF Confederation Cup (officially the 2023–24 TotalEnergies CAF Confederation Cup for sponsorship reasons) was the 21st edition of Africa's secondary club football tournament organized by the Confederation of African Football (CAF), under the current CAF Confederation Cup title after the merger of CAF Cup and African Cup Winners' Cup.

The winners automatically qualified for the 2024–25 CAF Confederation Cup, and also earn the right to play against the winners of the 2023-24 CAF Champions League in the 2024 CAF Super Cup.

== Association team allocation ==
All 56 CAF member associations may enter the CAF Confederation Cup, with the 12 highest ranked associations according to their CAF 5-year ranking eligible to enter two teams in the competition. As a result, theoretically a maximum of 68 teams could enter the tournament – although this level has never been reached.

For the 2023–24 CAF Confederation Cup, the CAF used the 2018–2023 CAF 5-year ranking, which calculated points for each entrant association based on their clubs’ performance over those 5 years in the CAF Champions League and CAF Confederation Cup. The criteria for points were the following:

	African Football League	CAF Champions League	CAF Confederation Cup
Winners	7 points	6 points	5 points
Runners-up	6 points	5 points	4 points
Losing semi-finalists	5 points	4 points	3 points
Losing quarter-finalists	4 points	3 points	2 points
3rd place in groups	3 points	2 points	1 point
4th place in groups	2 points	1 point	0.5 point

The points are multiplied by a coefficient according to the season as follows:

- 2023–24: × 5
- 2022–23: × 4
- 2021–22: × 3
- 2020–21: × 2
- 2019–20: × 1

== Teams ==
The following 52 teams from 41 associations entered the competition.

- Teams in **bold** received a bye to the second round.
- The other teams entered the first round.

Associations are shown according to their 2018–2023 CAF 5-year ranking – those with a ranking score have their rank and score (in parentheses) indicated.

Associations eligible to enter two teams (Top 12 associations)
Association	Rank (Pts)	Team	Qualifying method
Morocco	1 (180)	FUS Rabat	2022-23 Botola third place
Morocco	1 (180)	**RS Berkane**	2021-22 Moroccan Throne Cup winners
Egypt	2 (172.5)	**Zamalek**	2022–23 Egyptian Premier League third place
Egypt	2 (172.5)	**Modern Future**	2022–23 Egyptian Premier League fourth place
Algeria	2 (134)	**USM Alger**	Title holders (2022–23 CAF Confederation Cup winners)
Algeria	2 (134)	ASO Chlef	2022–23 Algerian Cup winners
South Africa	4 (114)	**SuperSport United**	2022–23 South African Premier Division third place
South Africa	4 (114)	Sekhukhune United	2022–23 Nedbank Cup runners-up
Tunisia	5 (101)	**Club Africain**	2022–23 Tunisian Ligue Professionnelle 1 third place
Tunisia	5 (101)	Olympique Béja	2022–23 Tunisian Cup winners
Tanzania	6 (56.5)	Azam	2022–23 Tanzanian Premier League third place
Tanzania	6 (56.5)	Singida Fountain Gate	2022–23 Tanzanian Premier League fourth place
DR Congo	7 (54)	**Saint-Éloi Lupopo**	2022–23 Linafoot (Cancelled) Entered after protesting about the FECOFA rankings
DR Congo	7 (54)	—	Daring Club Motema Pembe and Maniema Union failed to get a CAF Licence
Angola	8 (41.5)	**Sagrada Esperança**	2022–23 Girabola third place
Angola	8 (41.5)	Académica do Lobito	2022–23 Angola Cup runners-up
Sudan	9 (39)	Hay Al Arab	2022–23 Sudan Premier League third place
Sudan	9 (39)	Haidoub FC	2022–23 Sudan Premier League fourth place
Guinea	10 (29)	Milo FC	2022–23 Guinée Championnat National third place
Guinea	10 (29)	Académie SOAR	2022–23 Guinée Championnat National fourth place
Libya	11 (28)	Al Hilal Benghazi	2022–23 Libyan Premier League third place
Libya	11 (28)	Abu Salim	2022–23 Libyan Premier League fourth place
Nigeria	12 (25)	**Rivers United**	2022–23 Nigeria Professional Football League third place
Nigeria	12 (25)	Bendel Insurance	2023 Nigeria FA Cup winners

Associations eligible to enter one team
Association	Rank (Pts)	Team	Qualifying method
Ivory Coast	13 (21)	AFAD Djékanou	2023 Coupe de Côte d'Ivoire runners-up
Zambia	15 (15)	Maestro United	2022–23 Zambia Super League runners-up
Congo	16 (9.5)	**Diables Noirs**	2023 Congo Premier League runners-up
Senegal	17 (9)	Casa Sports	2022 Senegal FA Cup winners
Mali	18 (7)	Stade Malien	2022–23 Malian Cup winners
Togo	19 (5)	ASC Kara	2022–23 Togolese Championnat National runners-up
Uganda	19 (5)	**Kampala City**	2022–23 Uganda Premier League runners-up
Botswana	21 (4)	Gaborone United	2023 Botswana FA Challenge Cup winners
Burkina Faso	23 (2)	EF Ouagadougou	2022–23 Burkinabé Premier League runners-up
Eswatini	23 (2)	Young Buffaloes	2022–23 Eswatini Premier League runners-up
Kenya	23 (2)	Kakamega Homeboyz	2023 FKF President's Cup winners
Niger	23 (2)	AS Douanes Niger	2023 Niger Cup winners
Benin	27 (1)	Loto-Popo FC	2022–23 Benin Premier League runners-up
Ghana	27 (1)	Dreams F.C.	2022–23 Ghanaian FA Cup winners
Mauritania	27 (1)	AS Douanes Mauritania	2023 Coupe du Président de la République winners
Burundi	—	Aigle Noir	2023 Burundian Cup winners
Comoros	—	Belle Lumière	2023 Comoros Cup runners-up
Djibouti	—	Arta Solar	2023 Djibouti Cup winners
Equatorial Guinea	—	Cano Sport	2023 Equatoguinean Cup winners
Ethiopia	—	Bahir Dar Kenema	2022–23 Ethiopian Premier League runners-up
Liberia	—	Watanga	2023 Liberian FA Cup winners
Madagascar	—	Elgeco Plus	2023 Coupe de Madagascar winners
Mozambique	—	Ferroviário de Maputo	2023 Taça de Moçambique winners
Rwanda	—	**Rayon Sports**	2023 Rwandan Cup winners
Seychelles	—	La Passe	2023 Seychelles FA Cup winners
Sierra Leone	—	Kallon	2023 Sierra Leonean FA Cup winners
Somalia	—	Horseed	2023 Somalia Cup winners
South Sudan	—	Al Merreikh Juba	2023 South Sudan National Cup winners
Zanzibar	—	JKU	2023 Zanzibari Cup winners

Associations which did not enter a team

- Cameroon
- Cape Verde
- Central African Republic
- Chad
- Eritrea
- Gabon
- Gambia
- Guinea-Bissau
- Lesotho
- Malawi
- Mauritius
- Namibia
- Réunion
- São Tomé and Príncipe
- Zimbabwe

== Schedule ==
Schedule for 2023–24 CAF Confederation Cup
Phase	Round	Draw date	First leg	Second leg
Qualifying rounds	First round	25 July 2023	18–20 August 2023	25–27 August 2023
Qualifying rounds	Second round	25 July 2023	15–17 September 2023	29 September – 1 October 2023
Group stage	Matchday 1	6 October 2023	26 November 2023	
Group stage	Matchday 2	6 October 2023	3 December 2023	
Group stage	Matchday 3	6 October 2023	10 December 2023	
Group stage	Matchday 4	6 October 2023	20 December 2023	
Group stage	Matchday 5	6 October 2023	25 February 2024	
Group stage	Matchday 6	6 October 2023	3 March 2024	
Knockout stage	Quarter-finals	12 March 2024	31 March 2024	7 April 2024
Knockout stage	Semi-finals	12 March 2024	21 April 2024	28 April 2024
Knockout stage	Final	12 March 2024	12 May 2024	19 May 2024

== Qualifying rounds ==
The draw for the qualifying rounds was held on 25 July 2023, 11:00 GMT (14:00 local time, UTC+3), at the CAF headquarters in Cairo, Egypt. In the qualifying rounds, each tie was played on a home-and-away two-legged basis. If the aggregate score was tied after the second leg, the away goals rule was applied, and if still tied, extra time was not played, and the penalty shoot-out was used to determine the winner (Regulations III. 13 & 14).

=== First round ===
Team 1	Agg.	Team 2	1st leg	2nd leg
Bendel Insurance (Nigeria)	1–1 (4–3 p)	(Algeria) ASO Chlef	1–0	0–1
FUS Rabat (Morocco)	5–0	(Benin) Loto-Popo FC	3–0	2–0
Casa Sports (Senegal)	1–1 (a)	(Burkina Faso) EF Ouagadougou	1–1	0–0
Arta Solar (Djibouti)	6–0	(Somalia) Horseed	3–0	3–0
Singida Fountain Gate (Tanzania)	4–3	(Zanzibar) JKU	4–1	0–2
Bahir Dar Kenema (Ethiopia)	3–3 (4–3 p)	(Tanzania) Azam	2–1	1–2
Olympique Béja (Tunisia)	0–1	(Libya) Abu Salim	0–1	0–0
Kakamega Homeboyz (Kenya)	1–4	(Libya) Al Hilal Benghazi	0–0	1–4
Sekhukhune United (South Africa)	w/o (Note: Sekhukhune United won on a walkover after Young Buffaloes withdrew due to financial problems.)	(Eswatini) Young Buffaloes	—	—
Cano Sport (Equatorial Guinea)	1–4	(Zambia) Maestro United	1–1	0–3
Ferroviário de Maputo (Mozambique)	w/o (Note: Ferroviário de Maputo won on a walkover after Belle Lumière withdrew due to financial problems.)	(Comoros) Belle Lumière	—	—
Gaborone United (Botswana)	3–2	(Madagascar) Elgeco Plus	0–1	3–1
AS Douanes Mauritania	2–2 (a)	(Guinea) Académie SOAR	2–2	0–0
ASC Kara (Togo)	1–2	(Ivory Coast) AFAD Djékanou	0–0	1–2
Milo FC (Guinea)	2–3	(Ghana) Dreams FC	1–1	1–2
AS Douanes Niger	w/o (Note: Kallon won on a walkover after Niger clubs withdrew from 2023–24 CAF interclub competitions due to the 2023 Nigerien coup d'état.)	(Sierra Leone) Kallon	—	—
Watanga (Liberia)	2–7	(Mali) Stade Malien	1–3	1–4
Hay Al Arab (Sudan)	w/o (Note: Aigle Noir won on a walkover after Hay Al Arab withdrew from the competition due to the 2023 Sudan conflict.)	(Burundi) Aigle Noir	—	—
Haidoub (Sudan)	0–1	(South Sudan) Al Merreikh Juba	0–1	0–0
Académica do Lobito (Angola)	4–3	(Seychelles) La Passe	2–1	2–2

=== Second round ===
The 16 winners of the second round advanced to the group stage.

Team 1	Agg.	Team 2	1st leg	2nd leg
Bendel Insurance (Nigeria)	2–3	(Morocco) RS Berkane	2–2	0–1
FUS Rabat (Morocco)	1–1 (a)	(Algeria) USM Alger	1–1	0–0
EF Ouagadougou (Burkina Faso)	0–2	(Nigeria) Rivers United	0–0	0–2
Arta Solar (Djibouti)	3–4	(Egypt) Zamalek	2–0	1–4
Singida Fountain Gate (Tanzania)	2–4	(Egypt) Modern Future	1–0	1–4
Bahir Dar Kenema (Ethiopia)	2–3	(Tunisia) Club Africain	2–0	0–3
Abu Salim (Libya)	5–4	(Uganda) Kampala City	3–1	2–3
Al Hilal Benghazi (Libya)	2–2 (4–2 p)	(Rwanda) Rayon Sports	1–1	1–1
Sekhukhune United (South Africa)	4–2	(Democratic Republic of the Congo) Saint-Éloi Lupopo	3–1	1–1
Maestro United (Zambia)	1–4	(Republic of the Congo) Diables Noirs	1–2	0–2
Ferroviário de Maputo (Mozambique)	1–1 (3–5 p)	(Angola) Sagrada Esperança	1–0	0–1
Gaborone United (Botswana)	1–4	(South Africa) SuperSport United	1–1	0–3
Académie SOAR (Guinea)	3–2	(Ivory Coast) AFAD Djékanou	1–2	2–0
Dreams FC (Ghana)	3–2	(Sierra Leone) Kallon	2–1	1–1
Stade Malien (Mali)	3–3 (a)	(Burundi) Aigle Noir	2–0	1–3
Al Merreikh Juba (South Sudan)	0–3	(Angola) Académica do Lobito	0–0	0–3

== Group stage ==
The draw for the group stage was held on 6 October 2023, 12:00 GMT (14:00 local time, UTC+2), in Johannesburg, South Africa. The 16 winners of the second round of qualifying rounds were drawn into four groups of four.

The teams were seeded by their performances in the CAF competitions for the previous five seasons (CAF 5-year ranking points shown next to every team). Each group contains one team from each of Pot 1 and Pot 2, and two teams from Pot 3, and each team was allocated to the positions in their group according to their pot.

Pot	Pot 1	Pot 2	Pot 3
Teams	(Egypt) Zamalek (39 pts); (Morocco) RS Berkane (37 pts); (Algeria) USM Alger (27 pts); (Nigeria) Rivers United (10 pts)	(Republic of the Congo) Diables Noirs (5 pts); (Angola) Sagrada Esperança (4 pts); (Egypt) Modern Future (2.5 pts); (Tunisia) Club Africain (2 pts)	(Angola) Académica do Lobito; (Ghana) Dreams FC; (Guinea) Académie SOAR; (Libya) Abu Salim; (Libya) Al Hilal Benghazi; (Mali) Stade Malien; (South Africa) Sekhukhune United; (South Africa) SuperSport United

In the group stage, each group was played on a home-and-away round-robin basis. The winners and runners-up of each group advanced to the quarter-finals of the knockout stage.

Tiebreakers
The teams were ranked according to points (3 points for a win, 1 point for a draw, 0 points for a loss). If tied on points, tiebreakers were applied in the following order (Regulations III. 20 & 21):
1. Points in head-to-head matches among tied teams;
2. Goal difference in head-to-head matches among tied teams;
3. Goals scored in head-to-head matches among tied teams;
4. Away goals scored in head-to-head matches among tied teams;
5. If more than two teams were tied, and after applying all head-to-head criteria above, a subset of teams were still tied, all head-to-head criteria above were reapplied exclusively to this subset of teams;
6. Goal difference in all group matches;
7. Goals scored in all group matches;
8. Away goals scored in all group matches;
9. Drawing of lots.

=== Group A ===
Pos	Team	Pld	W	D	L	GF	GA	GD	Pts	Qualification	USMA	MOF	HIL	SSU
1	(Algeria) USM Alger	6	4	1	1	8	3	+5	13	Advance to knockout stage	—	1–0	2–0	2–1
2	(Egypt) Modern Future	6	3	2	1	9	3	+6	11	Advance to knockout stage	0–0	—	5–0	1–0
3	(Libya) Al Hilal Benghazi	6	2	0	4	6	13	−7	6		2–1	1–2	—	2–1
4	(South Africa) SuperSport United	6	1	1	4	5	9	−4	4		0–2	1–1	2–1	—

Source: CAF

=== Group B ===
Pos	Team	Pld	W	D	L	GF	GA	GD	Pts	Qualification	ZAM	SAL	SGA	SOAR
1	(Egypt) Zamalek	6	5	1	0	11	1	+10	16	Advance to knockout stage	—	1–0	1–0	3–0 (Note: CAF awarded Zamalek a 3–0 win after Académie SOAR failed to travel to Egypt.)
2	(Libya) Abu Salim	6	3	0	3	5	6	−1	9	Advance to knockout stage	1–2	—	1–0	1–0
3	(Angola) Sagrada Esperança	6	2	2	2	5	2	+3	8		0–0	3–0	—	2–0
4	(Guinea) Académie SOAR	6	0	1	5	0	12	−12	1		0–4	0–2	0–0	—

Source: CAF

=== Group C ===
Pos	Team	Pld	W	D	L	GF	GA	GD	Pts	Qualification	DFC	RIV	CA	ADL
1	(Ghana) Dreams FC	6	4	0	2	11	7	+4	12 (Note: Ranked on goal difference: Dreams FC +4, Rivers United +2.)	Advance to knockout stage	—	2–1	1–0	4–0
2	(Nigeria) Rivers United	6	4	0	2	10	8	+2	12	Advance to knockout stage	2–1	—	1–0	3–0
3	(Tunisia) Club Africain	6	3	1	2	9	4	+5	10		2–0	3–0	—	1–1
4	(Angola) Académica do Lobito	6	0	1	5	6	17	−11	1		2–3	2–3	1–3	—

Source: Flashscore

=== Group D ===
Pos	Team	Pld	W	D	L	GF	GA	GD	Pts	Qualification	RSB	MLI	SKU	DNS
1	(Morocco) RS Berkane	6	4	2	0	10	2	+8	14	Advance to knockout stage	—	3–0	2–0	2–0
2	(Mali) Stade Malien	6	3	1	2	6	6	0	10	Advance to knockout stage	1–2	—	1–0	1–0
3	(South Africa) Sekhukhune United	6	1	3	2	2	4	−2	6		0–0	0–0	—	2–1
4	(Republic of the Congo) Diables Noirs	6	0	2	4	3	9	−6	2		1–1	1–3	0–0	—

Source: CAF

== Knockout stage ==
The mechanism of the draws for each round was as follows:

- In the draw for the quarter-finals, the four group winners were seeded, and the four group runners-up were unseeded. The seeded teams were drawn against the unseeded teams, with the seeded teams hosting the second leg. Teams from the same group could not be drawn against each other, while teams from the same association could be drawn against each other.
- In the draws for semi-finals, there were no seedings, and teams from the same group or the same association could be drawn against each other. As the draws for the quarter-finals and semi-finals were held together before the quarter-finals were played, the identity of the quarter-final winners was not known at the time of the semi-final draw.

Group	Winners	Runners-up
A	(Algeria) USM Alger	(Egypt) Modern Future
B	(Egypt) Zamalek	(Libya) Abu Salim
C	(Ghana) Dreams F.C.	(Nigeria) Rivers United
D	(Morocco) RS Berkane	(Mali) Stade Malien

=== Bracket ===
The bracket was decided after the draw for the knockout stage, which was held on 12 March 2024, 14:00 CAT (UTC+2) at the CAF headquarters in Cairo, Egypt.

Quarter-finals
(Nigeria) Rivers United	1	0	1
(Algeria) USM Alger	0	2	2
(Libya) Abu Salim	0	2	2
(Morocco) RS Berkane	0	3	3
(Egypt) Modern Future	1	1	2
(Egypt) Zamalek	2	1	3
(Mali) Stade Malien	1	1	2
(Ghana) Dreams F.C.	2	1	3

Semi-finals
(Algeria) USM Alger	0	0	0
(Morocco) RS Berkane (w/o)	3	3	6
(Egypt) Zamalek	0	3	3
(Ghana) Dreams F.C.	0	0	0

Final
(Morocco) RS Berkane	2	0	2
(Egypt) Zamalek (a)	1	1	2

=== Quarter-finals ===
Team 1	Agg.	Team 2	1st leg	2nd leg
Modern Future (Egypt)	2–3	(Egypt) Zamalek	1–2	1–1
Abu Salim (Libya)	2–3	(Morocco) RS Berkane	0–0	2–3
Rivers United (Nigeria)	1–2	(Algeria) USM Alger	1–0	0–2
Stade Malien (Mali)	2–3	(Ghana) Dreams	1–2	1–1

=== Semi-finals ===
Team 1	Agg.	Team 2	1st leg	2nd leg
USM Alger (Algeria)	0–6 (w/o)	(Morocco) RS Berkane	0–3 (awd.)	0–3 (awd.)
Zamalek (Egypt)	3–0	(Ghana) Dreams FC	0–0	3–0

=== Final ===
The first leg was played on 12 May, and the second leg was played on 19 May 2024.

Team 1	Agg.	Team 2	1st leg	2nd leg
RS Berkane (Morocco)	2–2 (a)	(Egypt) Zamalek	2–1	0–1

12 May 2024
20:00 UTC+1

RS Berkane (Morocco)	2–1	(Egypt) Zamalek
Dayo 13' (pen.); Tahif 32'	Report	Jaziri 46'

Stade Municipal de Berkane, Berkane
Attendance: 10,000
Referee: Peter Waweru (Kenya)
19 May 2024
20:00 UTC+3

Zamalek (Egypt)	1–0	(Morocco) RS Berkane
Hamdi 23'	Report

Cairo International Stadium, Cairo
Attendance: 52,000
Referee: Issa Sy (Senegal)

2–2 on aggregate. Zamalek won on away goals.

== Top goalscorers ==
Team eliminated / inactive for this round.

Rank	Player	Team	MD1	MD2	MD3	MD4	MD5	MD6	QF1	QF2	SF1	SF2	F1	F2	Total
1	(Senegal) Paul Bassène	(Morocco) RS Berkane		2				1		1					4
1	(Mali) Abdoulaye Kanou	(Algeria) USM Alger			1			1		2					4
1	(Ghana) Abdul Aziz Issah	(Ghana) Dreams FC		1	1	1		1							4
1	(Ghana) John Antwi	(Ghana) Dreams FC		1	1				2						4
4	(Egypt) Ahmed Sayed Zizo	(Egypt) Zamalek		1	1				1						3
4	(Morocco) Adil Tahif	(Morocco) RS Berkane	1							1			1		3
4	(Morocco) Youssef Zghoudi	(Morocco) RS Berkane			1	1		1							3
4	(Mali) Yoro Mamadou Diaby	(Mali) Stade Malien	1						1	1					3
4	(Angola) Samuel Chissapa Cachimbombo	(Angola) Académica do Lobito		1	1			1							3
4	(Libya) Muetasimballlah Al Taeb	(Libya) Al Hilal Benghazi			2		1								3
4	(Nigeria) Kingsley Eduwo	(Tunisia) Club Africain				2		1							3
4	(Tunisia) Bassem Srarfi	(Tunisia) Club Africain	1	2											3

== See also ==
- 2023–24 CAF Champions League
- 2023 African Football League
- 2024 CAF Super Cup
- 2023 CAF Women's Champions League
