= Abdoulaye Sylla =

Abdoulaye Sylla may refer to:

- Abdoulaye Kapi Sylla (born 1982), Guinean former football midfielder
- Abdoulaye Sylla (footballer, born 1995), Guinean football goalkeeper for Hafia
- Abdoulaye Sylla (footballer, born 2000), Guinean football defender for Nantes
