= 2021–22 BSC Young Boys season =

Young Boys
2021–22 season
- Chairman: Hanspeter Kienberger
- Manager: David Wagner (until 7 March); Matteo Vanetta (from 7 March)
- Stadium: Stadion Wankdorf
- Swiss Super League: 3rd
- Swiss Cup: Third round
- UEFA Champions League: Group stage
- Top goalscorer: League: Jordan Pefok (22); All: Jordan Pefok (27)
Home colours	Away colours

The 2021–22 season was the 97th season in the existence of BSC Young Boys and the club's 26th consecutive season in the top flight of Swiss football. In addition to the domestic league, Young Boys participated in this season's editions of the Swiss Cup and the UEFA Champions League.

== Players ==
=== First-team squad ===
As of 15 February 2022

Note: Flags indicate national team as defined under FIFA eligibility rules; some limited exceptions apply. Players may hold more than one non-FIFA nationality.

No.	Pos.	Nation	Player
1	GK	SUI	Anthony Racioppi
4	DF	GUI	Mohamed Ali Camara
5	DF	SUI	Cédric Zesiger
6	MF	SUI	Esteban Petignat
7	MF	HUN	Kevin Varga (on loan from Kasımpaşa)
8	MF	SUI	Vincent Sierro
9	FW	FRA	Wilfried Kanga
10	FW	SRB	Miralem Sulejmani
11	MF	SUI	Edimilson Fernandes (on loan from Mainz 05)
13	FW	CMR	Moumi Ngamaleu
15	FW	COD	Meschak Elia
16	MF	SUI	Christian Fassnacht
17	FW	USA	Jordan Pefok
19	FW	SUI	Felix Mambimbi

No.	Pos.	Nation	Player
20	DF	SEN	Cheikh Niasse
21	DF	SUI	Ulisses Garcia
22	MF	SUI	Nico Maier
23	DF	SUI	Aurèle Amenda
24	DF	SUI	Quentin Maceiras
25	DF	FRA	Jordan Lefort
26	GK	SUI	David von Ballmoos
27	DF	SUI	Lewin Blum
28	DF	SUI	Fabian Lustenberger (captain)
30	MF	SUI	Sandro Lauper
32	MF	SUI	Fabian Rieder
61	GK	SUI	Leandro Zbinden
77	FW	POR	Joël Monteiro
91	GK	SUI	Guillaume Faivre

=== Out on loan ===
Note: Flags indicate national team as defined under FIFA eligibility rules; some limited exceptions apply. Players may hold more than one non-FIFA nationality.

No.	Pos.	Nation	Player
—	DF	SUI	Nicolas Bürgy (at Viborg)
—	DF	SUI	Pascal Schüpbach (at Thun)
—	MF	SUI	Alexandre Jankewitz (at FC St. Gallen)
—	MF	SUI	Michel Aebischer (at Bologna, obligation to buy)
—	MF	LUX	Christopher Martins (at Spartak Moscow)

No.	Pos.	Nation	Player
—	FW	SUI	Mischa Eberhard (at Yverdon-Sport)
—	FW	CMR	Jean-Pierre Nsame (at Venezia)
—	FW	SUI	Yannick Toure (at Wil)
—	FW	SUI	Shkelqim Vladi (at Aarau)

== Pre-season and friendlies ==
Win Draw Loss

23 June 2021 Friendly	Young Boys (Switzerland)	Cancelled	(Switzerland) Kriens	Bern, Switzerland
16:30 CEST (UTC+2)				Stadium: Stadion Wankdorf

28 June 2021 Friendly	Young Boys (Switzerland)	4–1	(Switzerland) Neuchâtel Xamax	Gstaad, Switzerland
16:00 CEST (UTC+2)				Stadium: Sportplatz Schützebode

6 July 2021 Friendly	Young Boys (Switzerland)	0–1	(Austria) Rheindorf Altach	Wohlen, Switzerland
18:00 CEST (UTC+2)				Stadium: Stadion Niedermatten

10 July 2021 Friendly	Young Boys (Switzerland)	2–0	(Netherlands) Feyenoord	Bern, Switzerland
14:30 CEST (UTC+2)	Spielmann 28'; Garcia 70'	Report		Stadium: Stadion Wankdorf

13 July 2021 Friendly	Yverdon-Sport (Switzerland)	Cancelled	(Switzerland) Young Boys	Yverdon-les-Bains, Switzerland
13:30 CEST (UTC+2)				Stadium: Stade Municipal

13 July 2021 Friendly	Young Boys (Switzerland)	2–2	(France) Strasbourg	Montreux, Switzerland
19:00 CEST (UTC+2)	Garcia (penalty missed) 8'; Siebatcheu 27'; Ngamaleu (penalty missed) 69'; Mambimbi 77'		Thomasson 5'; Sahi 85'	Stadium: Stade de Chailly

18 January 2022 Friendly	Young Boys (Switzerland)	6–0	(Switzerland) Sion	Bern
16:00 CET (UTC+1)				Stadium: Stadion Wankdorf

== Competitions ==
=== Overall record ===
Competition	First match	Last match	Starting round	Final position	Record							
Competition	First match	Last match	Starting round	Final position	Pld	W	D	L	GF	GA	GD	Win %
Swiss Super League	24 July 2021	22 May 2022	Matchday 1	3rd	36	16	12	8	80	50	+30	44.44
Swiss Cup	14 August 2021	27 October 2021	Round 1	Round 3	3	2	0	1	12	4	+8	66.67
UEFA Champions League	21 July 2021	8 December 2021	Second qualifying round	Group stage	12	5	4	3	20	20	+0	41.67
Total					51	23	16	12	112	74	+38	45.10

Source: Soccerway

=== Swiss Super League ===
==== League table ====
Pos	Team	Pld	W	D	L	GF	GA	GD	Pts	Qualification or relegation
1	Zürich (C)	36	23	7	6	78	46	+32	76	Qualification for Champions League second qualifying round
2	Basel	36	15	17	4	70	41	+29	62	Qualification for Europa Conference League second qualifying round
3	Young Boys	36	16	12	8	80	50	+30	60	Qualification for Europa Conference League second qualifying round
4	Lugano	36	16	6	14	50	54	−4	54	Qualification for Europa Conference League third qualifying round (Note: Lugano qualified for the Europa Conference League third qualifying round as the 2021–22 Swiss Cup champions.)
5	St. Gallen	36	14	8	14	68	63	+5	50	

Source: Swiss Super League
Rules for classification: 1) Points; 2) Goal difference; 3) Goals scored; 4) Head-to-head goal difference; 5) Away goals scored; 6) Draw.
(C) Champions

==== Results summary ====
Overall								Home						Away					
Pld	W	D	L	GF	GA	GD	Pts	W	D	L	GF	GA	GD	W	D	L	GF	GA	GD
36	16	12	8	80	50	+30	60	11	5	2	41	21	+20	5	7	6	39	29	+10

Source: Swiss Super League

==== Results by round ====
Round	1	2	3	4	5	6	7	8	9	10	11	12	13	14	15	16	17	18	19	20	21	22	23	24	25	26	27	28	29	30	31	32	33	34	35	36
Ground	A	H	A	H	A	H	A	H	A	H	H	A	A	H	A	H	H	A	H	A	H	A	H	A	H	A	H	A	H	A	H	A	A	H	A	H
Result	W	D	L	W	D	W	W	W	W	D	W	L	D	D	L	L	W	W	W	D	W	D	W	L	D	D	L	D	D	L	W	W	L	W	D	W
Position																																				

Source: Swiss Super League
A = Away; H = Home; W = Win; D = Draw; L = Loss

==== Matches ====
The league fixtures were announced on 24 June 2021.

24 July 2021 1	Luzern	3–4	Young Boys	Lucerne
18:00 CEST (UTC+2)	Schürpf 27', 52'; Ndiaye 41'	Report	Elia 14', 59'; Pefok 68', 90+3'	Stadium: Swissporarena; Attendance: 13,231; Referee: Fedayi San

31 July 2021 2	Young Boys	0–0	Grasshopper	Bern
20:30 CEST (UTC+2)	Martins (yellow card) 44'	Report	Toti (yellow card) 19'; Abrashi (yellow card) 50'	Stadium: Stadion Wankdorf; Attendance: 20,628; Referee: Sandro Schärer

7 August 2021 3	Sion	1–0	Young Boys	Sion
18:00 CEST (UTC+2)	Grgić 24' (pen.)	Report		Stadium: Stade Tourbillon; Attendance: 4,500; Referee: Stefan Horisberger

29 August 2021 5	Basel	1–1	Young Boys	Basel
16:30 CEST (UTC+2)	Cabral (yellow card) 41'; Esposito 52'; Petretta (yellow card) 87'; Palacios (yellow card) 90'	Report	Pefok 20'; Aebischer (yellow card) 38'; Maceiras (yellow card) 41' (yellow-red card) 43'; Ngamaleu (yellow card) 68'; Zesiger (yellow card) 71'	Stadium: St. Jakob-Park; Attendance: 30,027; Referee: Sandro Schärer

11 September 2021 6	Young Boys	4–0	Zürich	Bern
20:30 CEST (UTC+2)	Fassnacht 45+4'; Aebischer 64', 69'; Elia 89'	Report		Stadium: Stadion Wankdorf; Attendance: 24,062; Referee: Adrien Jaccottet

22 September 2021 7	Lausanne-Sport	1–6	Young Boys	Lausanne
18:00 CEST (UTC+2)	Amdouni 90'	Report	Garcia 27'; Elia 31'; Fassnacht 46', 85'; Pefok 62'; Kanga 88'	Stadium: Stade de la Tuilière; Attendance: 4,875; Referee: Luca Piccolo

25 September 2021 8	Young Boys	2–1	St. Gallen	Bern
18:00 CEST (UTC+2)	Pefok 3'; Mambimbi 47'	Report	Duah 61'	Stadium: Stadion Wankdorf; Attendance: 25,166; Referee: Luca Cibelli

3 October 2021 9	Servette	0–6	Young Boys	Lancy
16:30 CEST (UTC+2)	Frick (red card) 43'; Sauthier (yellow card) 70'	Report	Camara (yellow card) 32'; Rieder (yellow card) 35'; Ngamaleu 45+1' (pen.); Fassnacht 48', 69', 73'; Kanga 53', 76'; Lauper (yellow card) 78'	Stadium: Stade de Genève; Attendance: 11,348; Referee: Lukas Fähndrich

16 October 2021 10	Young Boys	1–1	Luzern	Bern
18:00 CEST (UTC+2)	Martins (yellow card) 29' (yellow-red card) 39'; Fassnacht (yellow card) 41'; von Ballmoos (yellow card) 79'; Sierro (yellow card) 86'; Ngamaleu 90+4'	Report	Schulz 30' (pen.); Ugrinic (yellow card) 73'; Grether (yellow card) 81'	Stadium: Stade de Suisse; Attendance: 26,336; Referee: Stefan Horisberger

23 October 2021 11	Young Boys	3–2	Lausanne-Sport	Bern
18:00 CET (UTC+1)	Hefti 13'; Rieder 76', (yellow card) 80'; Kukuruzović 80' (pen.); Fassnacht 82'; Ngamaleu (yellow card) 90'	Report	Amdouni 32'; Zohouri (yellow card) 33'; Husic (yellow card) 35'; Puertas (yellow card) 66'	Stadium: Stadion Wankdorf; Attendance: 24,033; Referee: Lukas Fähndrich

30 October 2021 12	St. Gallen	3–1	Young Boys	St. Gallen
18:00 CET (UTC+1)	Youan 4'; Görtler (yellow card) 37'; Faivre 47' (o.g.); Diakité 75'; Besio (yellow card) 87'	Report	Stillhart 82' (o.g.); Elia (yellow card) 90+5'	Stadium: Kybunpark; Attendance: 17,901; Referee: Fedayi San

6 November 2021 13	Grasshopper	1–1	Young Boys	Zürich
18:00 CET (UTC+1)	Sène (yellow card) 9'; Arigoni 26'; Loosli (yellow card) 33'; Da Silva (yellow card) 90+4'	Report	Sierro (yellow card) 34'; Bürgy (yellow card) 82'; Pefok 90+3'; Garcia (yellow card) 90+3'	Stadium: Letzigrund; Attendance: 7,736; Referee: Adrien Jaccottet

28 November 2021 15	Zürich	1–0	Young Boys	Zürich
14:15 CET (UTC+1)		Report		Stadium: Letzigrund; Attendance: 15,338; Referee: Alain Bieri

1 December 2021 4	Young Boys	3–1	Lugano	Bern
20:30 CET (UTC+1)		Report		Stadium: Stadion Wankdorf; Attendance: 19,973; Referee: Lukas Fähndrich

4 December 2021 16	Young Boys	1–2	Servette	Bern
20:30 CET (UTC+1)		Report		Stadium: Stadion Wankdorf

12 December 2021 17	Young Boys	4–3	Sion	Bern
14:15 CET (UTC+1)		Report		Stadium: Stadion Wankdorf

15 December 2021 14	Young Boys	1–1	Basel	Stadion Wankdorf, Bern
20:30	Elia 20'; Sierro (yellow card) 51'; Ngamaleu (penalty missed) 55′ Ngamaleu (yellow card) 57'; Zesiger (yellow card) 61'	Report	(yellow card) 12' Palacios; 37' Millar; (yellow card) 69' Esposito; (yellow card) 87' Burger	Attendance: 20,912; Referee: Fedayi San (Gebenstorf)
Note: The match was originally scheduled for 20 November 2021, but was postponed.

19 December 2021 18	Lugano	0–5	Young Boys	Cornaredo, Lugano
14:15		Report	Siebatcheu 6', 21', 49' (pen.), 61'; Camara 35'	Attendance: 3,500; Referee: Luca Cibelli

29 January 2022 19	Young Boys	1–0	Lugano	Bern
20:30 CET (UTC+1)		Report		Stadium: Stadion Wankdorf

6 February 2022 20	St. Gallen	3–3	Young Boys	St. Gallen
16:30 CET (UTC+1)		Report		Stadium: Kybunpark

13 February 2022 21	Young Boys	3–1	Basel	Bern
14:15 CET (UTC+1)	Sierro 39'; Ngamaleu 69'; Pefok 72'		Lang 22'	Stadium: Stadion Wankdorf; Referee: Urs Schnyder

20 February 2022 22	Grasshopper	2–2	Young Boys	Zürich
16:30 CET (UTC+1)		Report		Stadium: Letzigrund

26 February 2022 23	Young Boys	3–1	Sion	Bern
18:00 CET (UTC+1)		Report		Stadium: Stadion Wankdorf

1 March 2022 24	Servette	1–0	Young Boys	Lancy
20:30 CEST (UTC+2)		Report		Stadium: Stade de Genève

5 March 2022 25	Young Boys	2–2	Luzern	Bern
18:00 CET (UTC+1)		Report		Stadium: Stadion Wankdorf

13 March 2022 26	Lausanne-Sport	2–2	Young Boys	Lausanne
14:15 CEST (UTC+2)		Report		Stadium: Stade de la Tuilière

19 March 2022 27	Young Boys	1–2	Zürich	Bern
20:30 CEST (UTC+2)		Report		Stadium: Stadion Wankdorf

3 April 2022 28	Basel	2–2	Young Boys	St. Jakob-Park, Basel
16:30	Xhaka 41'; Lang (yellow card) 49'; Esposito 71'; Kasami (yellow card) 90+2'; Pelmard (yellow card) 90+4'	SFL summary	(yellow card) 57' Sierro; 61' Fernandes; (yellow card) 64' Mambimbi; 78' Kanga; (yellow card) 84' Amenda	Attendance: 25,760; Referee: Fedayi San (Gebenstorf)

9 April 2022 29	Young Boys	2–2	Lausanne-Sport	Bern
18:00 CEST (UTC+2)		Report		Stadium: Stadion Wankdorf

16 April 2021 30	Zürich	2–1	Young Boys	Letzigrund, Zürich
16:30	33' Ceesay; 61' Ceesay	SFL summary	73' Siebatcheu	Attendance: 17,663; Referee: Urs Schnyder

23 April 2022 31	Young Boys	3–1	Servette	Bern
20:30 CEST (UTC+2)		Report		Stadium: Stadion Wankdorf

1 May 2022 32	Sion	1–2	Young Boys	Sion
14:15 CEST (UTC+2)		Report		Stadium: Stade Tourbillon

7 May 2022 33	Lugano	3–1	Young Boys	Cornaredo, Lugano
8:00		SFL summary		Attendance: 2,866; Referee: Alain Bieri (Solothurn)

10 May 2022 34	Young Boys	4–1	St. Gallen	Bern
20:30 CEST (UTC+2)		Report		Stadium: Stadion Wankdorf

19 May 2022 35	Luzern	2–2	Young Boys	Lucerne
20:30 CEST (UTC+2)		Report		Stadium: Swissporarena

22 May 2022 36	Young Boys	3–0	Grasshopper	Bern
16:30 CEST (UTC+2)		Report		Stadium: Stadion Wankdorf

=== Swiss Cup ===
14 August 2021 Round 1	FC Littau	1–4	Young Boys	Littau
18:00 CEST (UTC+1)	Izzo 90'	Report	Kanga 18'; Sierro 42'; Aebischer 52'; Zesiger 57'	Stadium: Ruopigen

19 September 2021 Round 2	FC Iliria	1–7	Young Boys	Solothurn
16:00 CEST (UTC+1)	Elezi 79'	Report	Sulejmani 15'; Kanga 29', 43', 66'; Maceiras 33'; Rieder 35'; Burgy 44'	Stadium: Mittleres Brühl

27 October 2021 Round 3	FC Lugano	2–1	Young Boys	Lugano
19:00 CEST (UTC+1)	Celar 22'; Amoura 83'	Report	Rieder 90+1'	Stadium: Cornaredo Stadium

=== UEFA Champions League ===
==== Second qualifying round ====
The draw for the second qualifying round was held on 16 June 2021.

21 July 2021 First leg	Slovan Bratislava (Slovakia)	0–0	(Switzerland) Young Boys	Bratislava, Slovakia
20:30 CEST (UTC+2)	De Kamps (yellow card) 54'	Report	Pefok (yellow card) 38'; Aebischer (yellow card) 51'; Camara (yellow card) 59'; Lefort (yellow card) 86'	Stadium: Tehelné pole Attendance: 1,000; Referee: Chris Kavanagh (England)

28 July 2021 Second leg	Young Boys (Switzerland)	3–2 (3–2 agg.)	(Slovakia) Slovan Bratislava	Bern, Switzerland
20:15 CEST (UTC+2)	Pefok 10' (pen.); Garcia 24', (yellow card) 87'; Aebischer 48', (yellow card) 90+2'; Fassnacht (yellow card) 72'	Report	Henty (yellow card) 2', (goal) 58', 62'; Ratão (penalty missed) 21'; De Marco (yellow card) 74'; Weiss (yellow card) 79'; Rabiu (yellow card) 83'	Stadium: Wankdorf Stadium; Attendance: 19,564; Referee: Irfan Peljto (Bosnia and Herzegovina)

==== Third qualifying round ====
The draw for the third qualifying round was held on 19 July 2021.

3 August 2021 First leg	CFR Cluj (Romania)	1–1	(Switzerland) Young Boys	Cluj-Napoca, Romania
20:00 CEST (UTC+2)	Manea 4'; Sušić (yellow card) 45+4'; Deac (yellow card) 90+2'	Report	Sierro 90+3'	Stadium: Dr. Constantin Rădulescu; Attendance: 9,500; Referee: Danny Makkelie (Netherlands)

10 August 2021 Second leg	Young Boys (Switzerland)	3–1 (4–2 agg.)	(Romania) CFR Cluj	Bern, Switzerland
20:30 CEST (UTC+2)	Pefok 23', 42'; Ngamaleu 25'	Report	Omrani 4'	Stadium: Wankdorf Stadium; Attendance: 21,145; Referee: Cüneyt Çakır (Turkey)

==== Play-off round ====
The draw for the play-off round was held on 2 August 2021.

18 August 2021 First leg	Young Boys (Switzerland)	3–2	(Hungary) Ferencváros	Bern, Switzerland
21:00 CEST (UTC+2)	Pefok (yellow card) 13'; Elia 16', (yellow card) 26'; Zesiger (yellow card) 19'; Hefti (red card) 25'; Sierro 40'; Garcia 65'	Report	Boli 14', 82'; Kharatin (yellow card) 22'; Uzuni (penalty missed) 27'; Laïdouni (yellow card) 48'; Blažič (yellow card) 69'	Stadium: Wankdorf Stadium; Attendance: 15,652; Referee: Willie Collum (Scotland)

24 August 2021 Second leg	Ferencváros (Hungary)	2–3 (4–6 agg.)	(Switzerland) Young Boys	Budapest, Hungary
21:00 CEST (UTC+2)	Wingo 18', (yellow card) 70'; R. Mmaee 27', (yellow card) 81'; Zachariassen (yellow card) 30'; Laïdouni (yellow card) 58' (yellow-red card) 64'; Kovačević (yellow card) 66'	Report	Zesiger 4'; Fassnacht 56'; Martins (yellow card) 66'; Pefok (penalty missed) 72'; Mambimbi 90+3'	Stadium: Ferencváros Stadion; Attendance: 20,667; Referee: Sergei Karasev (Russia)

==== Group stage ====
The draw for the group stage was held on 26 August 2021.

Pos	Team	Pld	W	D	L	GF	GA	GD	Pts	Qualification	MUN	VIL	ATA	YB
1	(England) Manchester United	6	3	2	1	11	8	+3	11	Advance to knockout phase	—	2–1	3–2	1–1
2	(Spain) Villarreal	6	3	1	2	12	9	+3	10	Advance to knockout phase	0–2	—	2–2	2–0
3	(Italy) Atalanta	6	1	3	2	12	13	−1	6	Transfer to Europa League	2–2	2–3	—	1–0
4	(Switzerland) Young Boys	6	1	2	3	7	12	−5	5		2–1	1–4	3–3	—

Source: UEFA
Rules for classification: Group stage tiebreakers

14 September 2021 1	Young Boys (Switzerland)	2–1	(England) Manchester United	Bern, Switzerland
18:45 CEST (UTC+2)	Fassnacht (yellow card) 45+1'; Martins (yellow card) 50'; Ngamaleu 66'; Pefok 90+5'	Report	Ronaldo 13'; Wan-Bissaka (red card) 35'; Varane (yellow card) 64'	Stadium: Stadion Wankdorf; Attendance: 31,120; Referee: François Letexier (France)

29 September 2021 2	Atalanta (Italy)	1–0	(Switzerland) Young Boys	Bergamo, Italy
18:45 CEST (UTC+2)	Pessina 68'; Zappacosta (yellow card) 89'	Report	Sierro (yellow card) 65'	Stadium: Stadio Atleti Azzurri d'Italia; Attendance: 8,536; Referee: Felix Brych (Germany)

20 October 2021 3	Young Boys (Switzerland)	1–4	(Spain) Villarreal	Bern, Switzerland
18:45 CEST (UTC+2)	Aebischer (yellow card) 45'; Elia 77'	Report	Pino 6'; Gerard 16'; Rulli (yellow card) 87'; Moreno 89'; Chukwueze 90+2'	Stadium: Stadion Wankdorf; Attendance: 27,398; Referee: Sergei Karasev (Russia)

2 November 2021 4	Villarreal (Spain)	2–0	(Switzerland) Young Boys	Villarreal, Spain
18:45 CET (UTC+1)	Capoue 36'; Pedraza (yellow card) 38'; Mario Gaspar (yellow card) 55'; Parejo (yellow card) 78'; Danjuma 89'	Report	Sierro (yellow card) 52'; Ngamaleu (yellow card) 54'; Aebischer (yellow card) 62'; Elia (yellow card) 90+5'	Stadium: Estadio de la Cerámica; Attendance: 14,890; Referee: Serdar Gözübüyük (Netherlands)

23 November 2021 5	Young Boys (Switzerland)	3–3	(Italy) Atalanta	Bern, Switzerland
21:00 CET (UTC+1)	Garcia (yellow card) 22'; Pefok 39'; Ngamaleu (yellow card) 44'; Hefti (yellow card) 66', (goal) 84'; Sierro 80'	Report	Zapata 10', (yellow card) 90+2'; Palomino 51'; Demiral (yellow card) 63'; Muriel 88'	Stadium: Stadion Wankdorf; Attendance: 31,120; Referee: Daniel Siebert (Germany)

8 December 2021 6	Manchester United (England)	1–1	(Switzerland) Young Boys	Manchester, England
20:00 GMT (UTC±0)	Greenwood 9'	Report	Rieder 42'	Stadium: Old Trafford; Referee: Benoît Bastien (France)

== Statistics ==
=== Appearances and goals ===
No.	Pos	Nat	Player	Total		Swiss Super League		Swiss Cup		Champions League	
No.	Pos	Nat	Player	Apps	Goals	Apps	Goals	Apps	Goals	Apps	Goals
Goalkeepers
26	GK	(Switzerland) SUI	David von Ballmoos	17	0	8	0	2	0	7	0
61	GK	(Switzerland) SUI	Leandro Zbinden	0	0	0	0	0	0	0	0
68	GK	(Switzerland) SUI	Abdullah Laidani	1	0	0	0	0+1	0	0	0
91	GK	(Switzerland) SUI	Marco Sportiello	5	0	2	0	1	0	2	0
Defenders
4	DF	(Guinea) GUI	Mohamed Ali Camara	19	0	7+1	0	1+1	0	9	0
5	DF	(Switzerland) SUI	Cédric Zesiger	13	2	4	0	2	1	6+1	1
14	DF	(Switzerland) SUI	Nicolas Bürgy	4	0	1+1	0	2	0	0	0
21	DF	(Switzerland) SUI	Ulisses Garcia	19	3	7+2	1	0+1	0	9	2
24	DF	(Switzerland) SUI	Quentin Maceiras	14	0	4+2	0	3	0	1+4	0
25	DF	(France) FRA	Jordan Lefort	10	0	3+2	0	2	0	1+2	0
28	DF	(Switzerland) SUI	Fabian Lustenberger	0	0	0	0	0	0	0	0
36	DF	(Switzerland) SUI	Silvan Hefti	19	0	6+4	0	1	0	7+1	0
Midfielders
6	MF	(Switzerland) SUI	Esteban Petignat	0	0	0	0	0	0	0	0
7	MF	(Switzerland) SUI	Marvin Spielmann	9	0	1+2	0	2	0	1+3	0
8	MF	(Switzerland) SUI	Vincent Sierro	19	3	3+6	1	2	1	6+2	1
11	MF	(Switzerland) SUI	Alexandre Jankewitz	3	0	0+1	0	1+1	0	0	0
16	MF	(Switzerland) SUI	Christian Fassnacht	20	4	9+2	3	0+1	0	7+1	1
20	MF	(Switzerland) SUI	Michel Aebischer	19	4	8+2	2	0+2	1	6+1	1
22	MF	(Switzerland) SUI	Sandro Lauper	1	0	0	0	0+1	0	0	0
30	MF	(Switzerland) SUI	Nico Maier	9	0	2+2	0	1	0	1+3	0
32	MF	(Switzerland) SUI	Fabian Rieder	18	1	3+6	0	2+1	1	0+6	0
35	MF	(Luxembourg) LUX	Christopher Martins	17	1	7+1	1	1	0	7+1	0
Forwards
9	FW	(France) FRA	Wilfried Kanga	17	2	3+5	1	3	1	0+6	0
10	FW	(Serbia) SRB	Miralem Sulejmani	8	0	1+4	0	2	0	0+1	0
13	FW	(Cameroon) CMR	Moumi Ngamaleu	19	3	8+1	1	1	0	9	2
15	FW	(Democratic Republic of the Congo) COD	Meschak Elia	19	6	8+1	4	1	0	9	2
17	FW	(United States) USA	Jordan Siebatcheu	19	9	8+1	5	0+1	0	8+1	4
18	FW	(Cameroon) CMR	Jean-Pierre Nsame	0	0	0	0	0	0	0	0
19	FW	(Switzerland) SUI	Felix Mambimbi	17	2	3+5	1	3	0	1+5	1
29	FW	(Switzerland) SUI	Yannick Toure	1	0	0	0	0+1	0	0	0
77	FW	(Switzerland) SUI	Joël Monteiro	0	0	0	0	0	0	0	0
Players transferred out during the season-->
	DF			0	0	0	0	0	0	0	0
	FW			0	0	0	0	0	0	0	0

Last updated: 17 October 2021
Source: Competitions

=== Goalscorers ===
As of 3 October 2021

Rank	No.	Pos.	Nat.	Name	Swiss Super League	Swiss Cup	Champions League	Total
1	17	FW	(United States)	Jordan Pefok	5	0	4	9
2	16	FW	(Switzerland)	Christian Fassnacht	6	0	1	7
3	15	FW	(Democratic Republic of the Congo)	Elia Meschak	4	0	1	5
4	9	FW	(France)	Wilfried Kanga	3	0	0	3
4	13	FW	(Cameroon)	Moumi Ngamaleu	1	0	2	3
4	20	MF	(Switzerland)	Michel Aebischer	2	0	1	3
4	21	DF	(Switzerland)	Ulisses Garcia	1	0	2	3
8	8	MF	(Switzerland)	Vincent Sierro	0	0	2	2
8	19	FW	(Switzerland)	Felix Mambimbi	1	0	1	2
10	5	DF	(Switzerland)	Cédric Zesiger	0	0	1	1
Own goals					0	0	0	0
Totals					23	0	15	38
