= Facinet Conte =

Guinean footballer (born 2005)

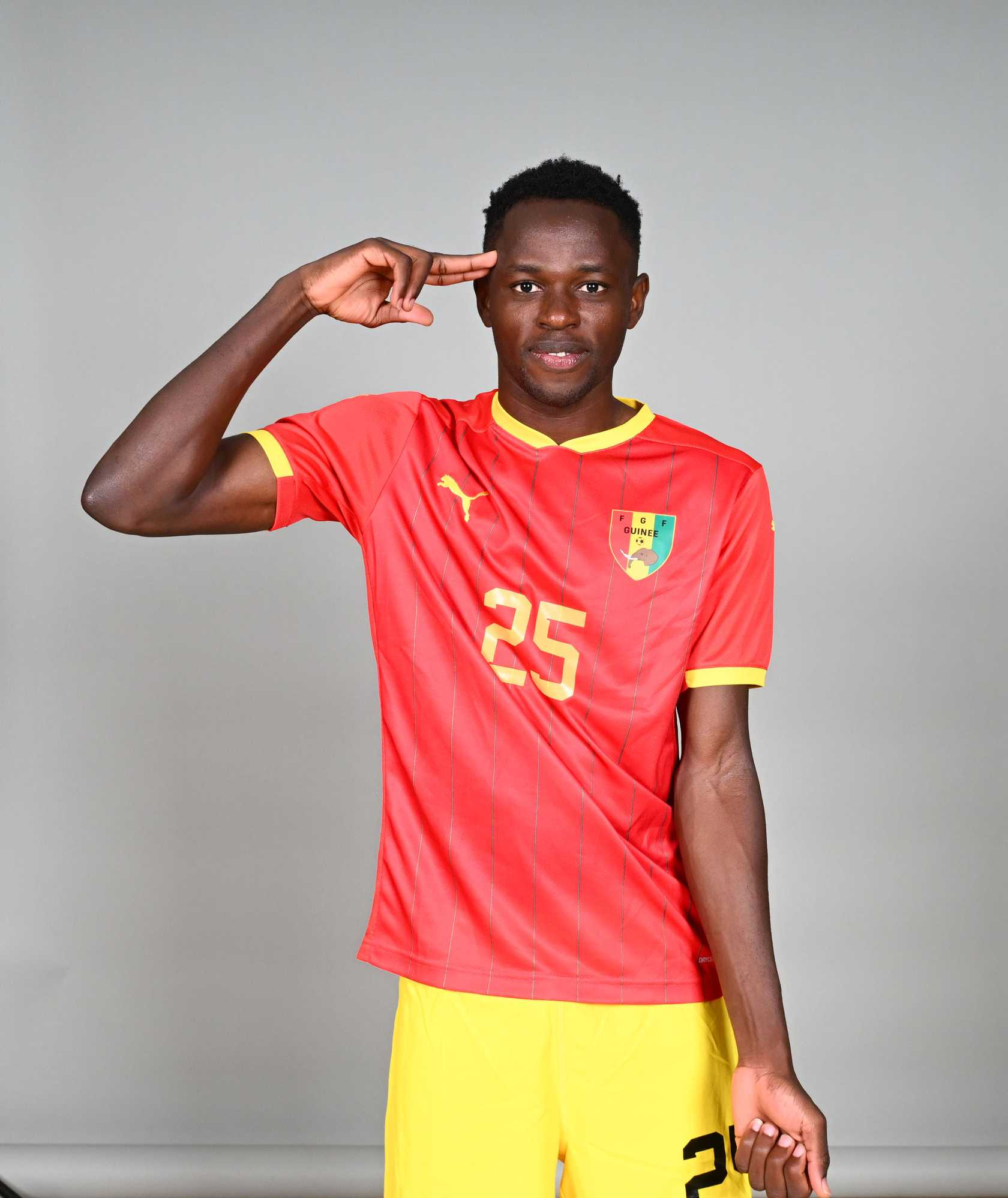
- Conte with Guinea in 2023

Personal information
- Date of birth: 24 March 2005 (age 21)
- Place of birth: Conakry, Guinea
- Height: 1.75 m (5 ft 9 in)
- Position: Forward

Team information
- Current team: Young Boys
- Number: 31

Youth career
- 2013–2022: Siaka Académie Foot
- 2022: Flamme Olympique
- 2022–2023: Siaka Académie Foot

Senior career*
Years	Team	Apps	(Gls)
2023–2024	Bastia	21	(6)
2024	Bastia B	1	(0)
2024–	Young Boys	0	(0)

International career^{‡}
2024–	Guinea U23	1	(0)
2024	Guinea	5	(1)
- * Club domestic league appearances and goals as of 15 June 2024 ‡ National team caps and goals as of 12:38, 5 April 2024 (UTC)

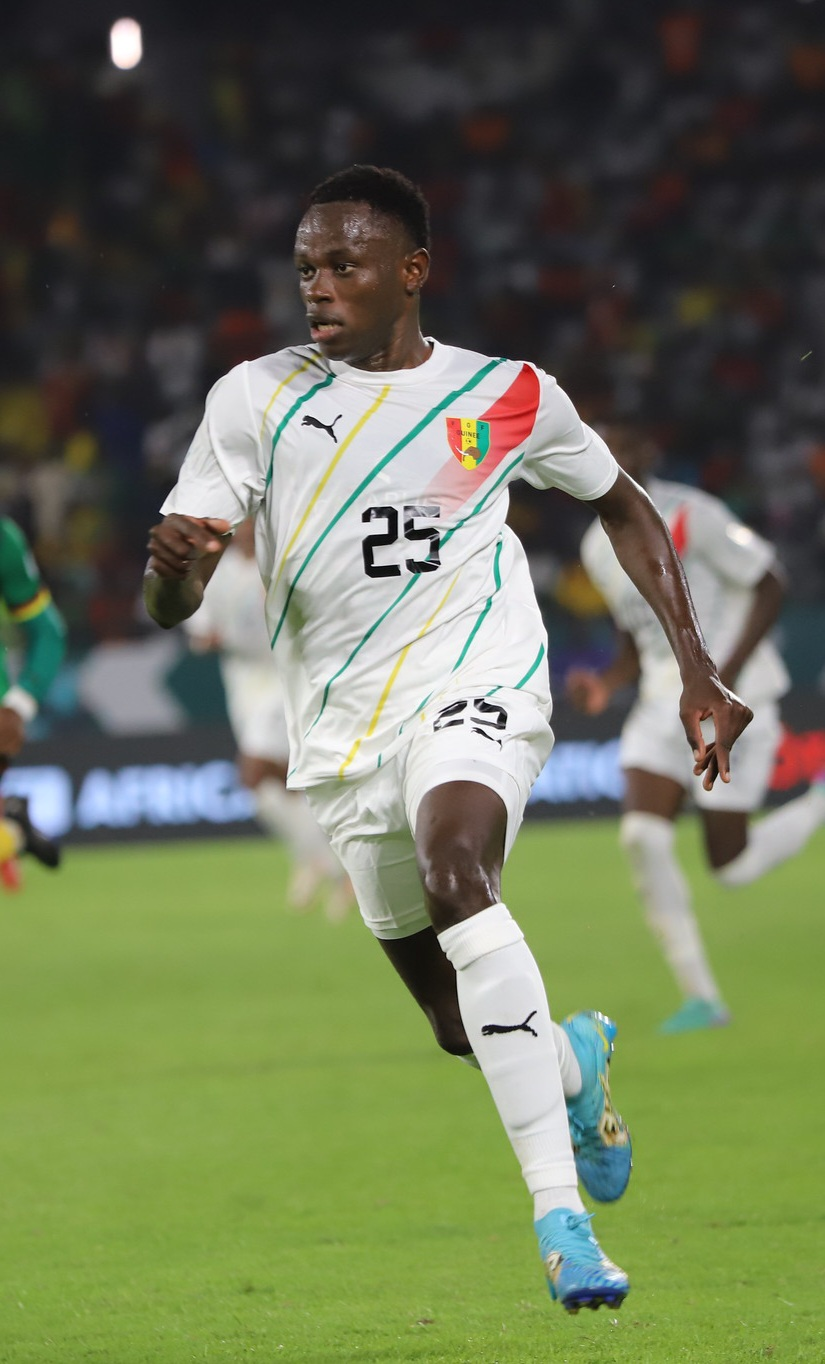
Conte with Guinea at the 2023 Africa Cup of Nations

Facinet Conte (born 24 March 2005) is a Guinean professional footballer who plays as a forward for Swiss Super League club Young Boys and the Guinea national team.

== Club career ==
Conte joined Siaka Académie Foot at the age of eight. In 2022, he joined Flamme Olympique, where he played a few matches across six months before returning to Siaka Académie Foot. In December 2022, Conte participated in two friendly matches with Ligue 2 side Bastia. On 29 June 2023, he signed for the club on a one-year contract with an option for a two-year extension. On 26 August 2023, Conte made his professional debut for Bastia as a 65th-minute substitute in a match against Troyes. He scored two goals in the 70th and 80th minutes to lead Bastia to a 3–2 victory. He signed for Swiss Super League club Young Boys in the summer of 2024 on a five-year contract.

== International career ==
Conte was called up to the Guinea national team for the 2023 Africa Cup of Nations. He scored on his debut with Guinea in a pre-tournament 2–0 win over Nigeria on 8 January 2024.
