= Germain Berthé =

Malian footballer (1993–2026)

Personal information
- Full name: Germain Berthé
- Date of birth: 24 October 1993
- Place of birth: Ségou, Mali
- Date of death: 17 July 2026 (aged 32)
- Height: 1.89 m (6 ft 2 in)
- Position: Goalkeeper

Senior career*
Years	Team	Apps	(Gls)
2010–2012	AS Police		
2012–2015	Onze Créateurs de Niaréla		
2015–2020	Horoya AC		
2021–2025	Real Bamako		
2025–2026	US Bougouni		

International career
2013	Mali U20	3	(0)
2014–2023	Mali	7	(0)
- * Club domestic league appearances and goals

Germain Berthé (24 October 1993 – 17 July 2026) was a Malian professional footballer who played as a goalkeeper. He made seven appearances for the Mali national team.

== Career ==
Berthé signed to Horoya AC in 2015, serving as the backup to veteran Khadim N'Diaye. When N'Diaye and Berthé both went down with injury in 2019, young reserve Moussa Camara took over the starting spot and Berthé was subsequently released in September 2020.

== Death ==
Berthé died on 17 July 2026, at the age of 32.
