= 2018 Guinée Coupe Nationale =

Tournament details
- Country: Guinea

Final positions
- Champions: Horoya AC
- Runners-up: Wakriya AC

The 2018 Guinée Coupe Nationale is the 59th edition of the Guinée Coupe Nationale, the knockout football competition of Guinea.

== Round 1 ==
Horoya AC and Hafia FC bye.

Groupe 1

[Jun 17]

Gbassikolo FC 0-2 Espérance de Coléah

[Jun 18]

FC Séquence 0-0 CO Coyah [3-4 pen]

[Jun 19]

Étoile de Guinée FC 3-4 AS Kaloum

TED Afrique 4-3 Atlético de Coléah

[Jun 20]

Santoba FC 1-2 AS Batè Nafadji

[Jun 21]

Flamme Olympique bt Satellite FC

Groupe 2

[Jun 17]

ASFAG 2-0 Gangan FC

Bafila FC 2-2 Soumba FC [4-3 pen]

Soya Stars de Pita 0-1 Wawa AC de Kindia

[Jun 18]

Lélou FC 3-2 Fello Star

[Jun 21]

Olympique de Conakry 1-1 Loubha FC [5-4 pen]

Alu Star de Fria bt Espoirs de Labé

Groupe 3

[Jun 17]

Éléphants de Filima awd AS Mineur de Sangarédi [3-0 awarded; AS Sangarédi withdrew]

CI Kamsar 1-3 Wakirya AC

[Jun 19]

RCC Kamsar 2-1 Eléphant de Coléah

[Jun 20]

AS Ratoma 0-2 Renaissance FC

Groupe 4

[Jun 17]

Niandan FC 1-2 Milo FC

Simandou FC (Beyla) awd Sankaran FC [3-0 awarded; Sankaran dns]

Yomou FC awd AS Manding de Siguiri [0-3 awarded; Yomou FC dns]

[Jun 18]

UNI Club de Kankan 0-0 Ashanti GB de Siguiri [5-4 pen]

== Round 2 ==
Groupe 1

[Jun 25]

AS Kaloum n/p TED Afrique [rained off]

[Jun 26]

AS Kaloum 2-0 TED Afrique

Groupe 2

[Jun 25]

Wawa AC de Kindia 2-2 Bafila FC [2-3 pen]

[Jun 27]

Olympique de Conakry 1-0 Lélou FC

Groupe 3

[Jun 27]

Wakirya AC n/p Renaissance FC [rained off]

[Jun 28]

Wakirya AC 1-0 Renaissance FC

== Round of 16 ==
Poule A

[Jul 7]

Olympique de Conakry 2-2 AS Batè Nafadji [4-5 pen]

[Jul 8]

Éléphants de Filima 0-1 Wakirya AC

Milo FC 2-0 Simandou FC (Beyla)

Hafia FC 2-1 Flamme Olympique

Poule B

[Jul 7]

Horoya AC 5-1 Alu Star de Fria

RCC Kamsar 2-1 Club Olympique de Coyah

[Jul 8]

AS Manding de Siguiri 0-0 AS Kaloum [7-6 pen]

Bafila FC (Forecariah) 0-1 ASFAG

== Quarterfinals ==
Poule A

[Aug 9]

Hafia FC 0-1 Wakirya AC

[Aug 10]

Milo FC 3-0 AS Batè Nafadji

Poule B

[Aug 8]

ASFAG 0-0 Horoya AC [3-4 pen]

[Aug 9]

RCC Kamsar 1-2 AS Manding de Siguiri

== Semifinals ==
[Stade du 28 septembre, Conakry]

Poule A [Aug 20]

Wakirya AC 1-1 Milo FC [4-3 pen]

Poule B [Sep 10]

Horoya AC 3-0 AS Manding de Siguiri

== Final ==
[Oct 5, Stade du 28 septembre, Conacry]

Horoya AC 1-0 Wakriya AC

== See also ==
- 2017–18 Guinée Championnat National
