= Alsény Camara (footballer, born 1996) =

Guinean footballer

Personal information
- Date of birth: 1 June 1996 (age 30)
- Position: Right back

Team information
- Current team: Horoya AC

Senior career*
Years	Team	Apps	(Gls)
2014–2016	AS Kaloum Star		
2016–	Horoya AC		

International career^{‡}
2016–	Guinea	7	(0)
- * Club domestic league appearances and goals as of 12:25, 4 October 2018 (UTC) ‡ National team caps and goals as of 12:25, 4 October 2018 (UTC)

Alsény Camara (born 1 June 1996) is a Guinean international footballer who plays for Horoya AC, as a right back.

== Career ==
He has played club football for AS Kaloum Star and Horoya AC.

He made his international debut for Guinea in 2016.
