= 2009 WAFU Club Championship =

Tournament details
- Teams: 14 (from 1 confederation)

Final positions
- Champions: (Guinea) Horoya AC (1st title)
- Runners-up: (Senegal) ASC HLM

The 2009 Wafu Club Championship is an association football competition that is contested between club sides in the WAFU/UFOA region.

It is sometimes referred to as the Eyadema Unity Cup.

== Participants ==
=== Zone A ===
- (Nigeria) Sunshine Stars F.C.
- (Ghana) Liberty Professionals
- (Burkina Faso) ASFA Yennega
- (Benin) USS Kraké
- (Nigeria) Gombe United F.C.
- (Niger) Akokana F.C.
- (Ivory Coast) USC Bassam
- (Benin) Tonnerre d'Abomey FC

=== Zone B ===
- (Senegal) ASC Stade
- (Guinea) Horoya AC
- (Mali) AS Bakaridjan de Baroueli
- (Senegal) ASC HLM Dakar
- (Niger) Sahel SC

== Matches ==
=== First round ===
==== Group A ====
Team 1	Agg.	Team 2	1st leg	2nd leg
ASC Stade de Mbour (Senegal)	1-2	(Guinea) Horoya AC	1-1	0-1
AS Bakaridjan (Mali)	w-o	(Senegal) ASC HLM	-	-
Sunshine Stars (Nigeria)	3-5	(Ghana) Liberty Professionals	3-3	0-2
ASFA Yennenga (Burkina Faso)	1-0	(Benin) US Seme-Kraké	1-0	0-0

==== Group B ====
Team 1	Agg.	Team 2	1st leg	2nd leg
Gombe United (Nigeria)	w/o	(Niger) Akokana FC	-	-
USC Bassam (Ivory Coast)	-	(Benin) AS Tonnerre	-	-
Sahel SC (Niger)	BYE		-	-

=== Second round ===
First leg were played August 21 to August 28 . Second leg were played September 17 to 19.

Team 1	Agg.	Team 2	1st leg	2nd leg
Liberty Professionals (Ghana)	w/o	(Niger) Sahel SC	-	-
ASC HLM (Senegal)	0-1	(Guinea) Horoya AC	0-0	0-1
Gombe United F.C. (Nigeria)	2-3	(Burkina Faso) ASFA Yennega	2-1	0-2

=== Third round ===
Team 1	Agg.	Team 2	1st leg	2nd leg
ASFA Yennega (Burkina Faso)	2-5	(Ghana) Liberty Professionals	0-0	2-5

=== Fourth round/Repechage ===
Team 1	Agg.	Team 2	1st leg	2nd leg
ASFA Yennega (Burkina Faso)	2-2	(Senegal) ASC HLM	2-0	0-2

ASC HLM advances on penalties 4-2

=== Semifinals ===
Semi-finals
11 December – Lomé
Gomido (Togo)	1
Horoya AC (Guinea)	2
11 December – Lomé
Liberty Professionals (Ghana)	1
ASC HLM (Senegal) ASC advances on penalties 3-0	1

Final
13 December – Lomé
Horoya AC	2
ASC HLM	1

=== Final ===
December 13

ASC HLM	1-2	Horoya AC
Bakary Mbaye (2H)	Report	Sylla Fode Moussa 26'; Aboubacar Kamara 44'

Stade Général Eyadema, Lomé
