= Lappé Bangoura =

Guinean football manager

Personal information
- Full name: Kanfory Mohamed Bangoura
- Date of birth: 25 October 1961 (age 65)
- Place of birth: Labé, Guinea

Managerial career
- Years: Team
- 2013: Horoya AC
- 2016–2018: Guinea

Kanfory Mohamed "Lappé" Bangoura (born in 1961) is a Guinean football coach.

Bangoura was appointed manager of the Guinea national football team in July 2016. He was sacked in January 2018.
