= Abou Mangué Camara =

Guinean footballer

Personal information
- Date of birth: 30 April 1996 (age 30)
- Place of birth: Fria, Guinea
- Height: 1.80 m (5 ft 11 in)
- Position: Right-back

Team information
- Current team: Horoya
- Number: 6

Senior career*
Years	Team	Apps	(Gls)
2015–	Horoya		

International career^{‡}
2019–	Guinea	3	(0)
- * Club domestic league appearances and goals as of 00:11, 26 March 2021 (UTC) ‡ National team caps and goals as of 00:11, 26 March 2021 (UTC)

Abou Mangué Camara (born 30 April 1996) is a Guinean footballer who plays as a right-back for Horoya and the Guinea national team.

== International career ==
Camara made his debut with the Guinea national team in a 1–0 2020 African Nations Championship qualification loss to Liberia on 21 September 2019.

== Personal life ==
Besides his footballing career, Camara founded an orphanage Sonfonia, Ratoma that he has run since 2012. He is a graduate of Philosophy from the University of Sonfonia.
