= Kémoko Camara =

Guinean footballer

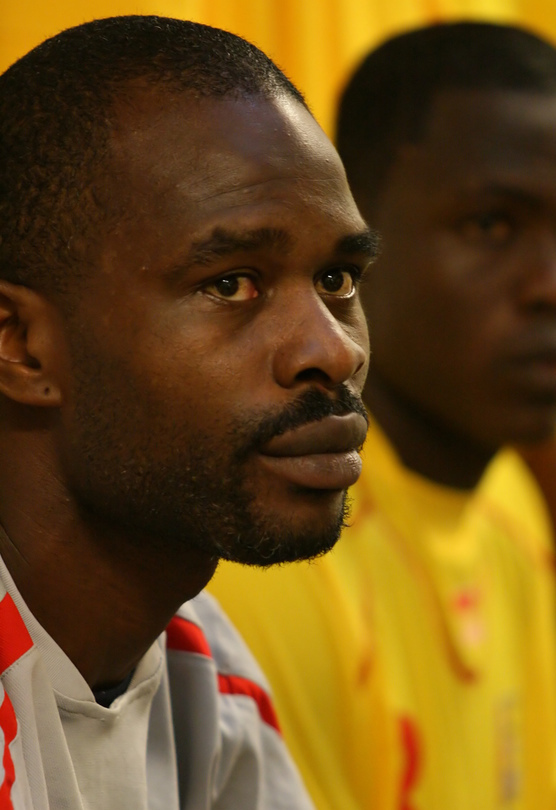
- Camara with Guinea in 2006

Personal information
- Date of birth: 5 April 1975 (age 51)
- Place of birth: Conakry, Guinea
- Height: 1.85 m (6 ft 1 in)
- Position: Goalkeeper

Senior career*
Years	Team	Apps	(Gls)
1994–1999	AS Kaloum		
1999–2003	Zuid-West-Vlaanderen	34	(0)
2003–2004	Bnei Sakhnin	16	(0)
2004–2005	Maccabi Ahi Nazareth	27	(1)
2005–2006	Hafia FC		
2006–2007	AmaZulu	11	(0)
2008	Dundee United	0	(0)
2008	East Stirlingshire (trial)	1	(0)
2009–2011	Cholet	0	(0)
2011–2013	AS Kaloum		
2013–2015	Horoya AC		

International career
1998–2013	Guinea	71	(0)
- * Club domestic league appearances and goals

Kémoko Camara (born 4 May 1975) is a Guinean former professional footballer who played as a goalkeeper. He played for the Guinea national team between 1998 and 2013.

== Club career ==
Camara was born in Conakry, Guinea.

In early March 2008, Camara signed a short-term deal with Dundee United of the Scottish Premier League, but despite being listed as a substitute on several occasions did not make a first-team appearance and was released at the end of the season.

In December 2008, he played a competitive trial match for East Stirlingshire, after manager Jim McInally had previously had him on trial at Greenock Morton.

After leaving Ochilview Park, Camara moved to France to play with SO Cholet, which won the sixth division (Division d'Honneur Atlantique) in France in the 2008–09 season.

== International career ==
Camara was part of the Guinea team at the 2004 African Cup of Nations, which finished second in their group in the first round of competition, before losing in the quarter-finals to Mali. He was also selected in the Guinean 2008 Africa Cup of Nations team, starting the first game against hosts Ghana.
