= Joël Monteiro =

Swiss footballer (born 1999)

Personal information
- Full name: Joël Almada Monteiro
- Date of birth: 5 August 1999 (age 27)
- Place of birth: Sion, Switzerland
- Height: 1.91 m (6 ft 3 in)
- Position: Forward

Team information
- Current team: Lecce
- Number: 99

Youth career
- 2016-2017: Sion

Senior career*
Years	Team	Apps	(Gls)
2017−2018	FC Azzurri 90	17	(4)
2018−2019	FC Conthey		
2019–2021	Team Vaud U21	17	(11)
2020–2021	Lausanne-Sport	4	(1)
2021–2026	Young Boys	132	(28)
2021	→ Stade Lausanne Ouchy (loan)	2	(0)
2026–	Lecce	7	(1)

International career^{‡}
2024–	Switzerland	7	(2)
- * Club domestic league appearances and goals as of 20:15, 29 October 2026 (UTC) ‡ National team caps and goals as of 31 March 2026

Joël Almada Monteiro (born 5 August 1999) is a Swiss professional footballer who plays as a forward for Serie A club Lecce in Italy and the Switzerland national team.

== Club career ==
On 20 September 2020, Monteiro made his professional debut with Lausanne-Sport in the 2020–21 season in a match against Servette.

On 31 August 2026, Monteiro signed a four-year contract with Lecce in Italy, with an optional fifth year.

== International career ==
Monteiro was called up to the Switzerland national team for the UEFA Nations League games against Denmark and Spain in September 2024. He made his senior international debut in a 4–1 defeat to Spain at the Stade de Genève on 8 September, coming off the bench to replace Michel Aebischer in the 76th minute.

== Personal life ==
Monteiro was born in Switzerland to a Cape Verdean family, and has Swiss and Portuguese nationality. His brother Elton Monteiro is also a professional footballer.

== Career statistics ==
=== Club ===
As of match played 29 October 2026

Appearances and goals by club, season and competition
Club	Season	League			Cup		Continental		Other		Total	
Club	Season	Division	Apps	Goals	Apps	Goals	Apps	Goals	Apps	Goals	Apps	Goals
FC Azzuri 90	2017–18	1. Liga	17	4	—		—		—		17	4
Team Vaud U21	2019–20	1. Liga	13	6	—		—		—		13	6
Team Vaud U21	2020–21	1. Liga	4	5	—		—		—		4	5
Team Vaud U21	Total		17	11	—		—		—		17	11
Lausanne-Sport	2020–21	Swiss Super League	4	1	1	0	—		0	0	5	1
Young Boys	2021–22	Swiss Super League	9	1	0	0	0	0	0	0	9	1
Young Boys	2022–23	Swiss Super League	28	1	5	2	2 (Note: Appearances in UEFA Conference League)	0	0	0	35	3
Young Boys	2023–24	Swiss Super League	32	12	3	0	8 (Note: Six appearances in UEFA Champions League, two appearances in UEFA Europa League)	0	0	0	43	12
Young Boys	2024–25	Swiss Super League	25	6	4	0	10 (Note: Appearances in UEFA Champions League)	2	0	0	39	8
Young Boys	2025–26	Swiss Super League	30	4	2	0	9 (Note: Appearances in UEFA Europa League)	3	—		41	7
Young Boys	2026–27	Swiss Super League	5	3	1	0	—		—		6	3
Young Boys	Total		129	27	15	2	29	5	0	0	173	34
Stade Lausanne Ouchy (loan)	2020–21	Swiss Challenge League	2	0	—		—		—		2	0
Lecce	2026–27	Serie A	7	1	—		—		—		7	1
Career total			176	44	16	2	29	5	0	0	221	51

=== International ===
As of match played 31 March 2026

Appearances and goals by national team and year
National team	Year	Apps	Goals
Switzerland	2024	4	0
Switzerland	2025	1	0
Switzerland	2026	2	1
Total		7	2

Switzerland score listed first, score column indicates score after each Monteiro goal.

List of international goals scored by Joël Monteiro
No.	Date	Venue	Opponent	Score	Result	Competition
1	18 November 2024	Estadio Heliodoro Rodríguez López, Santa Cruz de Tenerife, Spain	Spain	1–1	2–3	2024–25 UEFA Nations League A
2	27 March 2026	St. Jakob-Park, Basel, Switzerland	Germany	3–3	3–4	Friendly

== Honours ==
Young Boys

- Swiss Super League: 2022–23, 2023–24
- Swiss Cup: 2022–23
