= Soumba FC =

Guinean football club

Soumba
- Full name: Soumba FC
- Ground: Stade Negueya; Dubréka, Guinea
- Capacity: 1,000
- League: Guinée Championnat National
- 2013–14: 8th

Soumba is a football club from Soumba in the West African, state of Guinea. They play in the Guinée Championnat National, which is the highest league in Guinean football.

== Stadium ==
Currently the team plays at the 1,000 capacity Stade Negueya.
