= Milo FC =

Guinean football club

- Full name: Milo Football Club
- Nickname: Kankanais
- Founded: 1976; 50 years ago
- Ground: M'balou Mady Diakité Stadium
- Capacity: 2,000
- President: Sory Doumbaya
- Manager: Mamadouba Sylla Gaucher
- League: Ligue 1 Pro
- 2025–26: 5th
- Website: https://milofc.com/
Home colours	Away colours

Milo Football Club, also known as Milo FC, is a Guinean professional football club based in Kankan, Guinea. The club's manager is head coach Mamadouba Sylla Gaucher.

In August 2023, Milo FC hosted Dreams FC of Ghana in the first leg of the 2023–24 CAF Confederation Cup qualifying round, drawing 1–1 at the Lansana Conte Stadium in Conakry. Although the Guineans had a 1–0 lead going into halftime during the second leg at Accra Sports Stadium, Dreams FC came from behind to eliminate Milo FC from the competition, with a 3–2 aggregate score.

== History ==
The club has competed multiple times in the Guinée Championnat National. Notably, it finished sixth in the championship in 1992. During the 2014–2015 Ligue 2 season, Milo FC had the least prolific offense in the league with only 10 goals, and received the most red cards (4). At the end of the 2016–2017 season, after spending twelve years in lower divisions, Milo FC made a return to the top division by securing the second-place position in the championship with 45 points. This was achieved after a 3–1 victory against Étoile de Guinée on the 26th and final matchday. The team concluded the 2016–2017 season with 12 wins, 9 draws, and 5 losses, scoring 34 goals while conceding 18.

=== Return to the top flight (2017–2018) ===
The club had difficulties securing victories upon its return to the top flight, drawing all five of its initial matches. The first win came on the 6th matchday of the Guinée Championnat National with a score of 2–1 against CI Kamsar. The 15th matchday ended in a goalless draw against Éléphants de Coleah. The second victory was obtained on the 16th matchday, defeating Satellite FC of Ratoma 1–0. After 20 matchdays, Milo FC found itself at the bottom of the league table with 14 points, just one point above the first relegation spot held by Atlético and four points behind the first non-relegation spot, occupied by SAG. A 2–1 victory against the ASFAG brought Milo FC within 3 points of SAG. The club struggled to maintain its top-flight status and was relegated back to the second division after finishing in the penultimate position in the 2017–2018 championship.

=== Performance in Ligue 2 (2018–) ===
Following the relegation, Sékou Keïta, the club's top scorer in the top division with 15 goals across all competitions, left the club to join Ligue 1 Pro side Horoya AC.

=== 2018–2019 season ===
The club began with a narrow victory at home against RCCK (1–0). After 8 matches, Milo FC sat in 5th place in the championship with 12 points. By the 10th matchday, the team from Kankan climbed to the 4th position with 16 points, trailing behind Flamme Olympique (20 points), Manden FC (19 points), and Étoile de Guinée (18 points). During the 12th matchday, the Milo-Manden FC match ended in a 1–0 victory for the home team. The referee terminated the match in the 71st minute due to Manden FC supporters invading the field following the disallowed equalizing goal (deemed irregular by the referee). Manden FC from Siguiri received a fine of 3 million Guinean francs from the federation. In the return leg, Milo FC players left the field in Siguiri after conceding a penalty in the 78th minute while trailing 1–0. The final matchday saw an away defeat to the second-promoted Ligue 1 Pro side, Loubha FC, with a score of 2–0.
