= Athlético de Coléah =

Guinean football club

- Full name: Atlético Etoile de Coléah
- Ground: Stade du 28 Septembre; Conakry, Guinea
- Capacity: 35,000
- League: Guinée Championnat National
- 2017/18: 14th (relegation)

Atlético Etoile de Coléah is a Guinean football club from, Conakry, Guinea. The club is currently a member of the Guinée Championnat National, the top professional football league in Guinea. They play at Stade du 28 Septembre, which has a capacity of 35,000.

Their derby rivals are Eléphant de Coléah.

== Achievements ==
- Tournoi Ruski Alumini: 1

2005
