= Flamme Olympique FC =

Guinean football club

- Full name: Flamme Olympique de Guinee
- Nickname
- Short name: Flamme Olympique FC
- Founded: 2009; 17 years ago
- Stadium: Stade du 28 Septembre, Conakry
- Capacity: 25,000
- Chairman: Ibrahima Sory Nimagan
- Manager: Idrissa Oumar Doumbouya
- League: Ligue 1 Pro
- 2022–23: 6th

Flamme Olympique Football Club de Guinee is a Guinean football club based in Conakry. They play in the Guinean Second Division, which is the second league in Guinean football. They play their home games at 25,000 capacity Stade du 28 Septembre. Its uniform colors are white and blue.

== History ==
The club was founded in 2009. They played in the 2015-2016 Guinée Championnat National season ending at the 12th place.
