= Guinée Coupe Nationale =

- Founded: 1985
- Region: Guinea
- Teams: various
- Current champions: Horoya AC (9th title)
- Most championships: Horoya AC (9th titles)

The Coupe Nationale is the top knockout tournament of the Guinean football.

== Winners ==
Year	Winner	Score	Finalist
1985	AS Kaloum Star		
1986	Olympique Kakandé		
1987	ASFAG Conakry		
1988	Olympique Kakandé		
1989	Horoya AC		
1990	Mankona Guéckédou		
1991	ASFAG Conakry		
1992	Hafia FC		
1993	Hafia FC		
1994	Horoya AC		
1995	Horoya AC		
1996	ASFAG Conakry		Ashanti GB de Siguiri
1997	AS Kaloum Star		
1998	AS Kaloum Star	1–1 (6–5 p)	AS Mineurs de Sangarédi
1999	Horoya AC		AS Kaloum Star
2000	Fello Star	2–1	Horoya AC
2001	AS Kaloum Star		
2002	Hafia FC	5–3	Satellite FC
2003	Étoile de Guinée		Atlético Etoile de Coléah
2004	Fello Star	2–2 (5–4 p)	CI Kamsar
2005	AS Kaloum Star	0–0 (5–4 p)	Gangan FC
2006	Satellite FC	1–0	CI Kamsar
2007	AS Kaloum Star	1–0	Satellite FC
2008	Satellite FC	1–1 (5–3 p)	FC Séquence de Dixinn
2009	AS Baraka Djoma	0–0 (4–3 p)	Hafia FC
2010	FC Séquence de Dixinn	0–0 (3–1 p)	Satellite FC
2011	FC Séquence de Dixinn	3–1	AS Ashanti Golden Boys
2012	FC Séquence de Dixinn	0–0 (3–1 p)	AS Ashanti Golden Boys
2013	Horoya AC	1–0	CI Kamsar
2014	Horoya AC	3–0	Club Olympique de Coyah
2015	AS Kaloum	1–0	Horoya AC
2016	Horoya AC	2–1	AS Kaloum
2017	Hafia FC	0–0 (4–1 p)	Horoya AC
2018	Horoya AC	1–0	Wakirya AC
2019	Horoya AC	3–0	CI Kamsar
2020	Cup cancelled		

== Number of Wins ==
	Team	Titles	Years
1.	Horoya AC	9	1989, 1994, 1995, 1999, 2013, 2014, 2016, 2018, 2019
2.	AS Kaloum	7	1985, 1997, 1998, 2001, 2005, 2007, 2015
3.	Hafia FC	4	1992, 1993, 2002, 2017
4.	ASFAG	3	1987, 1991, 1996
-	FC Séquence	3	2010, 2011, 2012
6.	Fello Star	2	2000, 2004
-	Olympique Kakandé	2	1986, 1988
-	Satellite FC	2	2006, 2008
9.	Mankona Guéckédou	1	1990
-	Étoile de Guinée	1	2003
-	AS Baraka Djoma	1	2009
