= Gangan FC =

Guinean football club

- Full name: Gangan Football Club
- Founded: 1963 (as Sily Club de Kindia)
- Ground: Stade de Kindia
- Capacity: 2,500
- League: Guinée Championnat National
- 2024–25: Ligue 2, Group B, 6th
Home colours	Away colours

Gangan Football Club is a football club from Kindia in the West African, state of Guinea. They play in the Guinée Championnat National, which is the second highest league in Guinean football.

== History ==
In 1963 when the club was called Sily Club de Kindia the team has won the Guinée Coupe Nationale. The team was renamed Gangan Football Club in 2005.

== Honours ==
- Guinée Coupe Nationale
  - Winners (1): 1963

== Performance in CAF competitions ==
- African Cup of Champions Clubs: 1 appearance

1964 – Second Round
