= Guinée Championnat National =

Top-level football league in Guinea

Ligue 1
- Founded: 1965
- Country: Guinea
- Confederation: CAF
- Number of clubs: 14
- Level on pyramid: 1
- Domestic cup: Guinée Coupe Nationale
- International cup(s): Champions League; Confederation Cup
- Current champions: Horoya AC (2025–26)
- Most championships: Horoya AC (22)
- Current: 2026–27

The Guinée Championnat National (colloquially called Ligue 1 Pro) is the top level of Guinée Championnat National football competition created in 1965 under the authority of the Guinean Football Federation in Guinea.

== Ligue 1 Pro 2021–22 teams ==
Club	City	Standing 2021–2022
Horoya AC	Conakry	1st
Académie SOAR	Ratoma	2nd
Milo FC	Kankan	3rd
AS Ashanti Golden Boys	Siguiri	4th
CI Kamsar	Kamsar	5th
Wakriya AC	Boké	6th
Hafia FC	Conakry	7th
AS Kaloum	Conakry	8th
FC Séquence	Dixinn	9th
Fello Star	Labé	10th
Satellite FC	Conakry	11th
Flamme Olympique FC	Conakry	12th
Elephant de Coleah	Conakry	13th
Loubha Télimélé FC	Télimélé	14th

== Champions ==
- 1965: AS Kaloum Star (1)
- 1966: Hafia FC (1)
- 1967: Hafia FC (2)
- 1968: Hafia FC (3)
- 1969: AS Kaloum Star (2)
- 1970: AS Kaloum Star (3)
- 1971: Hafia FC (4)
- 1972: Hafia FC (5)
- 1973: Hafia FC (6)
- 1974: Hafia FC (7)
- 1975: Hafia FC (8)
- 1976: Hafia FC (9)
- 1977: Hafia FC (10)
- 1978: Hafia FC (11)
- 1979: Hafia FC (12)
- 1980: AS Kaloum Star (4)
- 1981: AS Kaloum Star (5)
- 1982: Hafia FC (13)
- 1983: Hafia FC (14)
- 1984: AS Kaloum Star (6)
- 1985: Hafia FC (15)
- 1986: Horoya AC (1)
- 1987: AS Kaloum Star (7)
- 1988: Horoya AC (2)
- 1989: Horoya AC (3)
- 1990: Horoya AC (4)
- 1991: Horoya AC (5)
- 1992: Horoya AC (6)
- 1993: AS Kaloum Star (8)
- 1994: Horoya AC (7)
- 1995: AS Kaloum Star (9)
- 1996: AS Kaloum Star (10)
- 1997: Not held
- 1998: AS Kaloum Star (11)
- 1999: Not held
- 2000: Horoya AC (8)
- 2001: Horoya AC (9)
- 2002: Satellite FC (1)
- 2003: ASFAG (1)
- 2004: Not held
- 2005: Satellite FC (2)
- 2006: Fello Star (1)
- 2006–07: AS Kaloum Star (12)
- 2007–08: Fello Star (2)
- 2008–09: Fello Star (3)
- 2009–10: Fello Star (4)
- 2010–11: Horoya AC (10)
- 2011–12: Horoya AC (11)
- 2012–13: Horoya AC (12)
- 2013–14: AS Kaloum Star (13)
- 2014–15: Horoya AC (13)
- 2015–16: Horoya AC (14)
- 2016–17: Horoya AC (15)
- 2017–18: Horoya AC (16)
- 2018–19: Horoya AC (17)
- 2019–20: Horoya AC (18)
- 2020–21: Horoya AC (19)
- 2021–22: Horoya AC (20)
- 2022–23: Hafia FC (16)
- 2023–24: Milo FC (1)
- 2024–25: Horoya AC (21)
- 2025–26: Horoya AC (22)

== Performance by club ==
	Club	City	Titles	Years
1	Horoya AC	Conakry	22	1986, 1988, 1989, 1990, 1991, 1992, 1994, 2000, 2001, 2011, 2012, 2013, 2015, 2016, 2017, 2018, 2019, 2020, 2021, 2022, 2025, 2026
2	Hafia FC	Conakry	16	1966, 1967, 1968, 1971, 1972, 1973, 1974, 1975, 1976, 1977, 1978, 1979, 1982, 1983, 1985, 2023
3	AS Kaloum Star	Conakry	13	1965, 1969, 1970, 1980, 1981, 1984, 1987, 1993, 1995, 1996, 1998, 2007, 2014
4	Fello Star	Labé	4	2006, 2008, 2009, 2010
5	Satellite FC	Conakry	2	2002, 2005
6	ASFAG	Conakry	1	2003
7	Milo FC	Kankan	1	2024

== Qualification for CAF competitions ==
=== Association ranking for the 2025–26 CAF club season ===
The association ranking for the 2025–26 CAF Champions League and the 2025–26 CAF Confederation Cup will be based on results from each CAF club competition from 2020–21 to the 2024–25 season.

Legend

- CL: CAF Champions League
- CC: CAF Confederation Cup
- ≥: Associations points might increase on basis of its clubs performance in 2024–25 CAF club competitions
- Associations ranked 1–12 are eligible to enter two teams in each CAF club competition.

Rank			Association	2020–21 (× 1)		2021–22 (× 2)		2022–23 (× 3)		2023–24 (× 4)		2024–25 (× 5)		Total
2025	2024	Mvt	Association	CL	CC	CL	CC	CL	CC	CL	CC	CL	CC	Total
1	1	—	Egypt	8	3	7	4	8	2.5	7	7	10	4	190.5
2	2	—	Morocco	4	6	9	5	8	2	2	4	5	5	142
3	4	+1	South Africa	8	2	5	4	4	3	4	1.5	9	3	131
4	3	-1	Algeria	6	5	7	1	6	5	2	3	5	5	130
5	6	+1	Tanzania	3	0.5	0	2	3	4	6	0	2	4	82.5
6	5	-1	Tunisia	4	3	5	1	4	2	6	1	3	0.5	82.5
7	8	+1	Angola	1	0	5	0	2	0	3	1.5	2	2	55
8	7	-1	DR Congo	4	0	0	3	1	2	4	0	2	0	45
9	9	—	Sudan	3	0	3	0	3	0	2	0	3	0	41
10	11	+1	Ivory Coast	0	0	0	1	0	3	3	0	1	2	38
11	10	-1	Libya	0	0.5	0	5	0	0.5	0	3	0	0	24
12	12	—	Nigeria	0	2	0	0	0	2	0	2	0	1	21
13	15	+2	Mali	0	0	0	0	0	1	0	2	1	0.5	18.5
14	14	—	Ghana	0	0	0	0	0	0	1	3	0	0	16
15	13	-2	Guinea	2	0	1	0	2	0	0	0.5	0	0	12
16	19	+3	Botswana	0	0	1	0	0	0	1	0	0	0.5	8.5
17	21	+4	Senegal	1	2	0	0	0	0	0	0	0	1	8
18	17	-1	Mauritania	0	0	0	0	0	0	2	0	0	0	8
19	18	-1	Congo	0	0	0	1	0	1	0	0.5	0	0	7
20	16	-4	Cameroon	0	3	0	0.5	1	0	0	0	0	0	7
21	22	+1	Togo	0	0	0	0	0	1	0	0	0	0	3
22	22	—	Uganda	0	0	0	0	1	0	0	0	0	0	3
23	-	new	Mozambique	0	0	0	0	0	0	0	0	0	0.5	2.5
24	20	-4	Zambia	0	1.5	0	0.5	0	0	0	0	0	0	2.5
25	24	-1	Eswatini	0	0	0	0.5	0	0	0	0	0	0	1
25	24	-1	Niger	0	0	0	0.5	0	0	0	0	0	0	1
27	26	-1	Burkina Faso	0	0.5	0	0	0	0	0	0	0	0	0.5

== Sponsorship and Naming ==
Period	Sponsor	Name
1965–2011	No main sponsor	Guinée Championnat National
2011–2013	Rio Tinto	Ligue 1 Rio Tinto
2013–2018	Nimba Mining	Ligue 1 Nimba Mining
2018–	Power Malt	Ligue 1 Pro

== Top goalscorers ==
Rank	Player	Team	Goals
2007	(Guinea) Abdoul Karim Keita	Kaloum Star	18
2010–11	(Guinea) Ousmane Barry	Horroya	17
2013–14	(Ivory Coast) Oscar Tahi Georges	Atlhetico de Coleah	11
2014–15	(Guinea) Kilé Bangoura	Soumba	13
2015–16	(Guinea) Kilé Bangoura	Horroya	11
2016–17	(Guinea) Momo Yansané	Hafia	14
2017–18	(Guinea) Ibrahima Sory Oulare	Wakriya	13
2018–19	(Guinea) Yakhouba Gnagna Barry	Santoba	17
2020–21	(Guinea) Elhadj Bah	Kamsar	21
2021–22	(Guinea) Yakhouba Gnagna Barry	Horroya	17
2022–23	(Guinea) Seydouba Bangoura	Milo	18

Most time goalscorers

- 2 times
  - Yakhouba Gnagna Barry (2018–19, 2021–22)
