= 28 September Stadium =

Stadium in Conakry, Guinea

Coordinates: 9°32′45.1″N 13°40′22.5″W

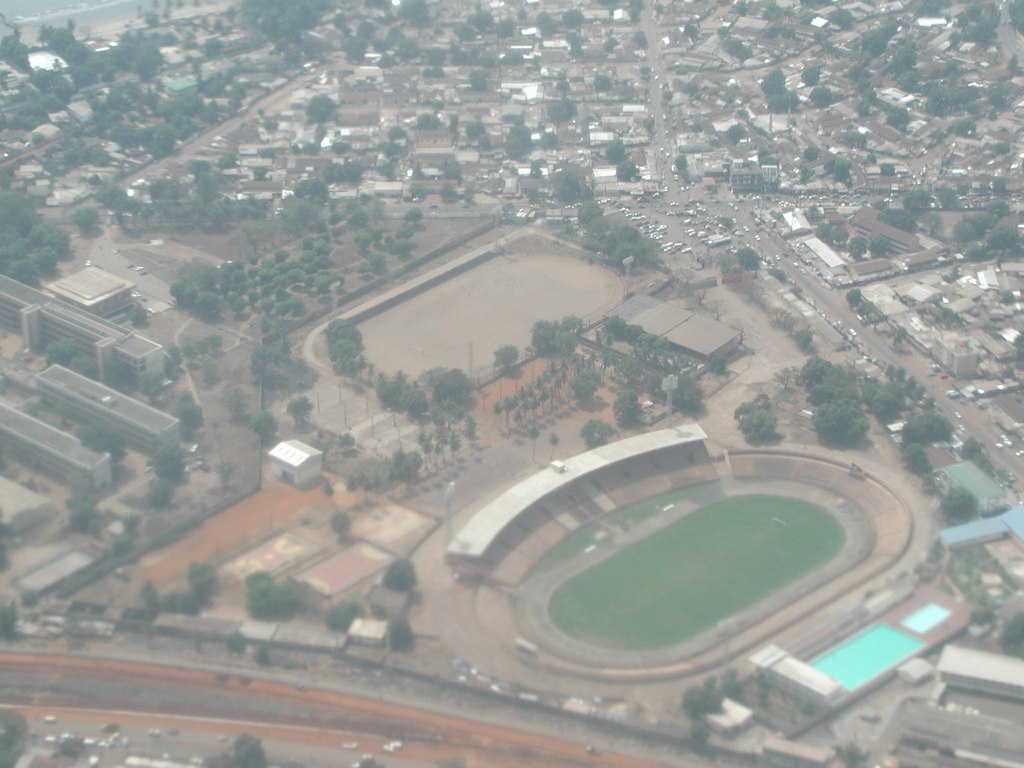
- Aerial view of the stadium
- Interactive map of 28 September Stadium
- Full name: Stade du 28 Septembre 1958
- Location: Conakry, Guinea
- Capacity: 25,000
- Surface: Grass

Construction
- Built: 1964

Tenants
- Horoya AC (1975–present); Satellite FC (2000–present); SOAR (2019–present)

28 September Stadium is a multi-purpose stadium in Conakry, Guinea. It is currently used mostly for football matches. The stadium has a capacity of 25,000 people.

In an attempt to host the 2023 African Cup of Nations (ANC), or Coupe d'Afrique des Nations (CAN) in French, proposals have been made to upgrade or reconstruct the 28 September Stadium to an all seater capacity of 45,000–50,000 people.

== Events ==
- some of the Football matches of the national team
- Football matches of major teams of Guinea
- Funeral of Ahmed Sékou Touré and
- Funeral of general Lansana Conté
- political meetings

== Name ==
The Stadium gets its name from 28 September, the day Guinea voted against the French referendum, which ultimately led to the political independence of Guinea on 2 October 1958. Guinea-Conakry (formerly French Guinea) is the first former French colony in Sub-Saharan Africa to attain political independence.

== 28 September protest ==
On 28 September 2009 opposition party members demonstrated in the Stade du 28 Septembre, demanding that Guinean president Captain Moussa Dadis Camara step down. Security forces fired into the crowd killing 157 people and injuring 1,200. In response to criticism from international human rights organisations, the government has said that only 56 people died and most were trampled by fleeing protesters. The International Criminal Court is currently investigating the incident and the African Union asked for Camara's resignation.
