= Académie SOAR =

Guinean football club

- Full name: Super Olympique d'une Afrique Renaissante
- Nickname: SOAR
- Founded: 2019; 4 years ago
- Ground: Stade du 28 Septembre, Conakry
- Capacity: 25,000
- Chairman: Almamy Saïdou Sylla
- Manager: Adda Benamar
- League: Ligue 1 Pro
- 2022–23: 4th
Home colours	Away colours

Académie Super Olympique d'une Afrique Renaissante, commonly known as SOAR and formerly known as CO Coyah, is a Guinean football club located in Ratoma, Guinea. The club competes in the Ligue 1 Pro, the top division of football in Guinea. Nicknamed SOAR, it was founded as CO Coyah in, but changed its name to Académie Super Olympique d'une Afrique Renaissante in 2019. SOAR has established itself as a talent generator developing young players most notably Morlaye Sylla.

== History ==
Coyah was first promoted into the Guinée Championnat National for the 2016–17 season. Founded as Club Olympique de Coyah (CO Coyah or short), had pretty rough times in the league bouncing back between the first and second league. In 2019 as CO Coyah had been promoted they had been bought by Almamy Saidou Sylla who rebranded the club as SOAR. The club became a talent generator focusing on promoting young players. The same season the club finished 4th. In the 2021/22 the club finished second runners up to Horoya AC. The club developed many African talents such as Morlaye Sylla and Béni Makouana.

== Colours and badge ==
Coyah's colours are Blue and Black.

== Former managers ==
- Rachid Ghaflaoui (2019–2020)
