= Wakriya AC =

Guinean football club

- Full name: Wakriya Athletic Club
- Ground: Stade du 1er mai, Boké, Guinea
- Manager: Guillaume Soumah
- League: Ligue 1 Pro
- 2025–26: 6th
- Website: https://www.wakriya.com/

Wakriya Athletic Club is a football club based in Boké, Guinea. They club plays in the Guinée Championnat National, which is the highest league in Guinean football.

They club will take part of the 2018–19 CAF Confederation Cup, as runners-up of the 2018 National Cup Guinee News.

== Achievements ==
=== National ===
- Guinée Championnat National: 0
- Guinée Coupe Nationale: 0

Runner-up: 2018

== Performance in CAF competitions ==
- CAF Confederation Cup: 1 appearance

2018–19 –
