= CI Kamsar =

Guinean football club

- Full name: Club Industriel de Kamsar
- Ground: Stade de l'Amitié, Kamsar
- Capacity: 2,000
- Chairman: Ibrahima Sy
- Manager: Mahamadou Diallo
- League: Ligue 1 Pro
- 2025–26: 3rd place
Home colours	Away colours

Club Industriel de Kamsar is an association football club from Guinea based in Kamsar. They currently play in the Ligue 1 Pro the top tier of Guinean Football.

== Current squad ==
Note: Flags indicate national team as defined under FIFA eligibility rules; some limited exceptions apply. Players may hold more than one non-FIFA nationality.

No.	Pos.	Nation	Player
1	GK	BEN	Sheyi Damilola
31	GK	TOG	Serge Mensah
31	GK	MLI	Ibrahim Kone
13	DF	GHA	Amos Frimpong
17	DF	BEN	Carrof Sogbossi
2	MF	GUI	Fernandez Lamine
7	FW	GHA	Sampson Eduku
9	FW	IRQ	Rakan Alrefae
10	FW	GUI	Moussa Diallo
6	MF	GUI	Michel Milimono

== Honours ==
- Guinée Coupe Nationale
  - Runners-up (3): 2004, 2006, 2013
