= Horoya AC =

Association football club in Guinea

Horoya
- Full name: Horoya Athletic Club
- Nickname: H.A.C.
- Founded: 1975; 51 years ago
- Ground: Stade du 28 Septembre
- Capacity: 25,000
- President: Antonio Souaré
- Manager: Lappé Bangoura
- League: Ligue 1 Pro
- 2025–26: Champions
- Website: www.horoyaac.com
Home colours	Away colours

Horoya Athletic Club, also known as Horoya Conakry or H.A.C., is a Guinean professional football club based in Conakry, Guinea. The club plays in the Ligue 1 Pro, the top tier in the Guinean football league system. It was founded in 1975.

== History ==
In 2014, they eliminated the 2013 FIFA Club World Cup runner-up Raja Casablanca in the second qualifying round of the 2014 CAF Champions League.

In 2018, after finishing second in the group stage of the CAF Champions League, the club reached the quarter-finals for the first time in its history, where it lost against Al Ahly SC 4–0 on aggregate (0–0 in Conakry and 4–0 in Cairo).

== Club identity ==
The name Horoya means Liberty or Freedom in both Guinea's local and Arabic languages. The word comes from the huge and significant Arabic influence on Guinean society.

=== Home shirt ===
Its Home shirt colours are red and white. The red, symbol of blood of the martyrs for the independence struggle and white for great purity and hope.

=== Crest ===
Historical evolution of Horoya AC crest

1978-2014

2014-2016

Since 2016

== Honours ==
=== National ===
- Ligue 1 Pro: 22
  - Champions: 1986, 1988, 1989, 1990, 1991, 1992, 1994, 2000, 2001, 2011, 2012, 2013, 2015, 2016, 2017, 2018, 2019, 2020, 2021, 2022, 2025, 2026 (Record)
- Guinée Coupe Nationale: 9
  - Champions: 1989, 1994, 1995, 1999, 2013, 2014, 2016, 2018, 2019
- Guinean Super Cup: 5
  - Champions: 2012, 2013, 2017, 2018, 2022 (Record)

=== International ===
- African Cup Winners' Cup: 1
  - Champions: 1978
- UFOA Cup: 1
  - Champions: 2009

== Rivalry ==
The Conakry Derby, is a football match between Guinean clubs Horoya AC and HAFIA FC. It is a match between arguably the two most successful clubs in Guinea.

== Performance in CAF competitions ==
- CAF Champions League : 12 appearances

2000 – first round
2002 – preliminary round
2012 – first round

2013 – preliminary round
2014 – play-off round
2016 – first round

2017 – first round
2018 – quarter-finals
2018–19 – quarter-finals
2019–20 – first round
2020–21 – group stage (top 16)
2021–22 – group stage

- African Cup of Champions Clubs : 6 appearances

1986 – second round
1987 – first round

1989 – first round
1992 – second round

1993 – first round
1995 – first round

- CAF Confederation Cup : 2 appearances

2017 – group stage (top 16)
2019–2020 – semi-finals

- CAF Cup : 3 appearances

1997 – first round
1998 – second round
1999 – first round

- CAF Cup Winners' Cup : 7 appearances

1978 – champion
1979 – semi-finals
1980 – second round

1983 – semi-finals
1984 – first round
1985 – second round

1996 – first round

- West African Club Championship : 1 appearance

2009 – champion

== Current squad ==
As of 12 November 2021

Note: Flags indicate national team as defined under FIFA eligibility rules; some limited exceptions apply. Players may hold more than one non-FIFA nationality.

No.	Pos.	Nation	Player
1	GK	GUI	Sékou Sylla
3	DF	COD	El Jireh Nsingani
4	DF	GUI	Ibrahima Sow
5	DF	MLI	Boubacar Samassekou
6	MF	GUI	Ismaël Camara
7	MF	GUI	Naby Soumah
8	MF	GUI	Alseny Soumah
9	FW	GUI	Daouda Camara
11	MF	GUI	Alassane Mendy
13	DF	GUI	Alseny Camara
14	DF	MLI	Issaka Samaké
15	FW	GUI	Gnagna Barry
16	GK	GUI	Modibo Touré
17	MF	GUI	Abdoulaye Bamba
18	DF	GUI	Fode Camara

No.	Pos.	Nation	Player
22	GK	GUI	Moussa Camara
23	DF	GUI	Ibrahima Sory Doumbouya
25	DF	GUI	Ibrahima Condé
26	MF	GUI	Sory Sidibé
27	DF	GUI	Abou Mangué
28	MF	GUI	Mohamed Coumbassa
29	FW	GUI	Boniface Haba
30	FW	GUI	Fodé Diabaté
31	FW	GUI	Sekou Keita
33	DF	GUI	Samuel Conté
35	GK	SLE	Medo Kamara
38	FW	GUI	Sory Traoré

== Notable coaches ==
- (Guinea) Mario Diabaté
- (Guinea) Pierre Bangoura
- (Guinea) Mohamed Dansoko
- (Guinea) Souleymane Cherif
- (Guinea) Mohamed Lamine Kaba
- (Guinea) Mory Conde La Valeur
- (Guinea) Kanfory Lapé Bangoura
- (Guinea) Mamadouba Sylla
- (Guinea) Aboubacar Fofana
- (Guinea) Mohamed Zouba Camara
- (Guinea) Amara Péle
- (Guinea) Mohamed Sylla Leandro
- (Guinea) Ibrahima Sory Toure Damas
- (Guinea) Issiaga Fadiga
- (Democratic Republic of the Congo) Théophile Bola
- (Senegal) Amara Traore
- (Guinea) Kanfory Lapé Bangoura
- (France) Victor Zvunka
- (France) Patrice Neveu
- (France) Didier Gomes Da Rosa
