= Satellite FC =

Guinean football club

- Full name: Satellite Football Club
- Founded: 2000
- Ground: Stade du 28 Septembre, Conakry, Guinea
- Capacity: 25,000
- Chairman: Ousmane Diakité
- Manager: Oumarou Diarra
- League: Ligue 2
- 2024–25: 2nd, Ligue 2, Group A
Home colours

Satellite Football Club is a Guinean football club whose team plays in the Ligue 1 Pro. Their home games are played at the 25,000-capacity Stade du 28 Septembre in Conakry.

== Achievements ==
=== Domestic ===
- Guinée Championnat National: 2
  - Champion: 2002, 2005
- Guinée Coupe Nationale: 2
  - Winner: 2006, 2008
- Guinée Super Coupe: 1
  - Winner: 2008
- Tournoi Ruski Alumini: 3
  - Winner: 2001, 2004, 2006

== Performance in CAF competitions ==
- CAF Champions League

2003 – First Round
2006 – Preliminary Round

- CAF Confederation Cup

2007 – First Round
2008 – First Round
2009 – First Round

- CAF Cup

2002 – Second Round
