= Guinean Football Federation =

Governing body of football in Guinea

CAF
- Founded: 1959
- Headquarters: Conakry
- FIFA affiliation: 1962
- CAF affiliation: 1962
- President: Bouba Sampil
- Website: http://www.feguifoot.com/

The Guinean Football Federation (French: Fédération Guinéenne de Football, FGF) is the governing body of football in Guinea. It was founded in 1959, affiliated to FIFA and to CAF in 1962. It organizes the national football league and the national team, which has never qualified for the World Cup.
