= Guinea national football team results (2020–present) =

This article provides details of international football games played by the Guinea national football team from 2020 to present.

== Results ==
Key
Win
Draw
Defeat

=== 2020 ===
10 October 2020 Friendly	Cape Verde	1–2	Guinea	Faro/Loulé, Portugal
15:00 UTC+1	Semedo 39'	Report	Kaba 46'; Bangoura 66'	Stadium: Estádio Algarve

13 October 2020 Friendly	Gambia	Cancelled	Guinea	Albufeira, Portugal
20:00 UTC+1		Report		Stadium: Estádio Municipal de Albufeira

11 November 2020 2021 AFCONQ	Guinea	1–0	Chad	Conakry, Guinea
16:00 UTC+0	Camara 45'	Report		Stadium: Stade du 28 Septembre; Referee: Mohamed Maarouf Eid (Egypt)

15 November 2020 2021 AFCONQ	Chad	1–1	Guinea	N'Djamena, Chad
17:00 UTC+1	Abdaraman 45'	Report	Keïta 24'	Stadium: Stade Omnisports Idriss Mahamat Ouya; Referee: Seydou Tiama (Burkina Faso)

=== 2021 ===
19 January 2021 2020 CHAN GS	Guinea	3–0	Namibia	Limbe, Cameroon
20:00 UTC+1	Barry 13', 86'; Sylla 45+2'	Report		Stadium: Limbe Stadium; Referee: Jean Claude Ishimwe (Rwanda)

23 January 2021 2020 CHAN GS	Zambia	1–1	Guinea	Limbe, Cameroon
17:00 UTC+1	Sautu 87'	Report	Kantabadouno 58'	Stadium: Limbe Stadium; Referee: Adil Zourak (Morocco)

27 January 2021 2020 CHAN GS	Tanzania	2–2	Guinea	Douala, Cameroon
20:00 UTC+1	Majogoro 23'; Manyama 69'	Report	Barry 4' (pen.); Kantabadouno 82'	Stadium: Stade de la Réunification; Referee: Georges Gatogato (Burundi)

31 January 2021 2020 CHAN	Guinea	1–0	Rwanda	Limbe, Cameroon
20:00 UTC+1	Sylla 60'	Report		Stadium: Limbe Stadium; Referee: Samir Guezzaz (Morocco)

3 February 2021 2020 CHAN	Mali	0–0 (a.e.t.) (5–4 p)	Guinea	Douala, Cameroon
16:00 UTC+1		Report		Stadium: Japoma Stadium; Referee: Mahmoud El Banna (Egypt)
	Penalties
	Samake (penalty scored); Kyabou (penalty scored); Samabali (penalty scored); Kanoute (penalty scored); Coulibaly (penalty scored)		(penalty scored) Barry; (penalty scored) Camara; (penalty scored) Camara; (penalty scored) Bangoura; (penalty missed) Sylla

6 February 2021 2020 CHAN	Guinea	2–0	Cameroon	Douala, Cameroon
20:00 UTC+1	Sylla 9'; Bangoura 45+1'	Report		Stadium: Stade de la Réunification; Referee: Lahlou Benbraham (Algeria)

24 March 2021 2021 AFCONQ	Guinea	1–0	Mali	Conakry, Guinea
16:00 UTC+0	Soumah 76'	Report		Stadium: General Lansana Conté Stadium; Referee: Youssef Essrayri (Tunisia)

28 March 2021 2021 AFCONQ	Namibia	2–1	Guinea	Windhoek, Namibia
15:00 UTC+2	Shalulile 45+2', 77'	Report	Kane 17'	Stadium: Sam Nujoma Stadium; Referee: Norman Matemera (Zimbabwe)

31 May 2021 Friendly	Turkey	0–0	Guinea	Antalya, Turkey
20:00 UTC+3		Report		Stadium: Antalya Stadium; Referee: Aliyar Aghayev (Azerbaijan)

5 June 2021 Friendly	Guinea	0–2	Togo	Manavgat, Turkey
20:00 UTC+3		Report	Laba 9' (pen.), 88'	Stadium: Arslan Zeki Demirci Sports Complex; Attendance: 0 Referee: Yaşar Kemal Uğurlu (Turkey)

8 June 2021 Friendly	Kosovo	1–2	Guinea	Manavgat, Turkey
17:00 UTC+3	Manaj 90+3'	Report	Kouyaté 60'; Kanté 65' (pen.)	Stadium: Arslan Zeki Demirci Sports Complex; Attendance: 0 Referee: Sarper Barış Saka (Turkey)

11 June 2021 Friendly	Guinea	2–1	Niger	Manavgat, Turkey
17:00 UTC+3	Camara 56'; Conté 72' (pen.)	Report	Adebayor 29'	Stadium: Arslan Zeki Demirci Sports Complex; Attendance: 0

1 September 2021 2022 World Cup qualification	Guinea-Bissau	1–1	Guinea	Nouakchott, Mauritania
16:00 UTC+0	Mendes 51'	Report	Kamano 7'	Stadium: Stade Olympique; Referee: Mutaz Ibrahim (Libya)

6 October 2021 2022 World Cup qualification	Sudan	1–1	Guinea	Marrakesh, Morocco
17:00 UTC+1	Teiri 72'	Report	Bayo 56'	Stadium: Marrakesh Stadium; Referee: Janny Sikazwe (Zambia)

9 October 2021 2022 World Cup qualification	Guinea	2–2	Sudan	Agadir, Morocco
14:00 UTC+1	J. Kanté 48'; Bayo 67'	Report	Al-Tash 64'; Kamal 88'	Stadium: Stade Adrar; Referee: Mustapha Ghorbal (Algeria)

12 October 2021 2022 World Cup qualification	Guinea	1–4	Morocco	Conakry, Guinea
20:00 UTC+1	Kané 31'	Report	El Kaabi 21'; Amallah 43', 65'; Boufal 89'	Stadium: General Lansana Conté Stadium; Referee: Sidi Alioum (Cameroon)
Note: The match was originally scheduled to be played on 6 September 2021, 16:00 UTC+0, but was postponed due to security concerns following the 2021 Guinean coup d'état.

12 November 2021 2022 World Cup qualification	Guinea	0–0	Guinea-Bissau	Conakry, Guinea
16:00 UTC+0		Report		Stadium: General Lansana Conté Stadium; Referee: Mohamed Marouf (Egypt)

16 November 2021 2022 World Cup qualification	Morocco	3–0	Guinea	Casablanca, Morocco
20:00 UTC+1	Mmaee 21' (pen.), 29'; El Kaabi 60'	Report		Stadium: Stade Mohamed V Referee: Joshua Bondo (Botswana)

=== 2022 ===
3 January 2022 Friendly	Guinea	0–3	Rwanda	Kigali, Rwanda
14:00 UTC+2				Stadium: Stade Amahoro

6 January 2022 Friendly	Rwanda	0–2	Guinea	Kigali, Rwanda
				Stadium: Stade Amahoro

10 January 2022 2021 AFCON GS	Guinea	1–0	Malawi	Bafoussam, Cameroon
17:00 UTC+1	Sylla 35'	Report		Stadium: Kouekong Stadium; Referee: Daniel Nili Laryea (Ghana)

14 January 2022 2021 AFCON GS	Senegal	0–0	Guinea	Bafoussam, Cameroon
14:00 UTC+1		Report		Stadium: Kouekong Stadium; Referee: Bamlak Tessema Weyesa (Ethiopia)

18 January 2022 2021 AFCON GS	Zimbabwe	2–1	Guinea	Yaoundé, Cameroon
17:00 UTC+1	Musona 26'; Mahachi 43'	Report	N. Keïta 49'	Stadium: Stade Ahmadou Ahidjo; Referee: Salima Mukansanga (Rwanda)

24 January 2022 2021 AFCON R16	Guinea	0–1	Gambia	Bafoussam, Cameroon
17:00 UTC+1		Report	Mu. Barrow 71'	Stadium: Kouekong Stadium; Referee: Amin Omar (Egypt)

25 March 2022 Friendly	South Africa	0–0	Guinea	Kortrijk, Belgium
18:00 UTC+1		Report		Stadium: Guldensporen Stadion; Referee: Allard Lindhout (Netherlands)

5 June 2022 2023 AFCON Q	Egypt	1–0	Guinea	Cairo, Egypt
21:00 UTC+2	Mohamed 87'	Report		Stadium: Cairo International Stadium; Referee: Hélder Martins de Carvalho (Angola)

9 June 2022 2023 AFCON Q	Guinea	1–0	Malawi	Conakry, Guinea
19:00 UTC+0	Keïta 90+1'	Report		Stadium: General Lansana Conté Stadium; Referee: Lamin Jammeh (Gambia)

27 August 2022 2022 African Nations Championship Q	Senegal	1–0	Guinea	Senegal
	Diagne 59'

2 September 2022 2022 African Nations Championship Q	Guinea	1–0 (3–5 p)	Senegal	Guinea
	Dramé 2'

23 September 2022 Friendly	Algeria	1–0	Guinea	Bir El Djir, Algeria
20:00 UTC+1	Slimani 79'	Report		Stadium: Olympic Stadium; Referee: Beida Dahane (Mauritania)

27 September 2022 Friendly	Ivory Coast	3–1	Guinea	Amiens, France
20:00 UTC+2	Sangaré 30'; Doumbia 41'; Fofana 45+1'	Report	Diakhaby 52'	Stadium: Stade de la Licorne; Referee: Thomas Léonard (France)

=== 2023 ===
24 March 2023 AFCON qualification	Guinea	2–0	Ethiopia	Casablanca, Morocco
20:30 UTC+0	Kamano 39'; Bayo 73'	Report		Stadium: Stade Mohammed V Referee: Djindo Louis Houngnandande (Benin)

27 March 2023 AFCON qualification	Ethiopia	2–3	Guinea	Rabat, Morocco
19:00 UTC+0	Markneh 34'; Jemma 90+5'	Report	Keïta 4'; Moriba 42'; Guilavogui 70'	Stadium: Prince Moulay Abdellah Stadium; Referee: Alhadi Allaou Mahamat (Chad)

14 June 2023 AFCON qualification	Guinea	1–2	Egypt	Marrakesh, Morocco
20:00 UTC+1	Guirassy 26'	Report	Trézéguet 42'; Mohamed 79'	Stadium: Marrakesh Stadium; Referee: Daniel Nii Laryea (Ghana)

17 June Friendly	Brazil	4–1	Guinea	Barcelona, Spain
21:00 UTC+2	Joelinton 27'; Rodrygo 30'; Militão 47'; Vinícius 88' (pen.)	Report	Guirassy 36'	Stadium: RCDE Stadium; Referee: Andris Treismanis (Latvia)

9 September 2023 AFCON qualification	Malawi	2–2	Guinea	Lilongwe, Malawi
15:00 UTC+2	Saizi 23'; Chaziya 88'	Report	A. Camara 56'; Sow 58'	Stadium: Bingu National Stadium; Referee: Clement Franklin Kpan (Ivory Coast)

13 October Friendly	Guinea	1–0	Guinea-Bissau	TBD, Portugal
		Report		Stadium: TBD

17 October Friendly	Guinea	1–1	Gabon	TBD, Portugal
		Report		Stadium: TBD

17 November 2026 FIFA World Cup qualification	Guinea	2–1	Uganda	Berkane, Morocco
14:00 UTC+1	Camara 10'; Cissé 90+5'	Report	Bayo 30'	Stadium: Stade Municipal de Berkane; Attendance: 250; Referee: Messie Jessie Oved Nkounkou Mvoutou (Congo)

21 November 2026 FIFA World Cup qualification	Botswana	1–0	Guinea	Francistown, Botswana
15:00 UTC+2	Seakanyeng 79'	Report		Stadium: Obed Itani Chilume Stadium; Referee: Patrice Tanguy Mebiame (Gabon)

=== 2024 ===
8 January Friendly	Guinea	2–0	Nigeria	Abu Dhabi, United Arab Emirates
16:00 UTC+4	Ag. Camara 15'; F. Conté 65'	Report		Stadium: Baniyas Stadium

15 January 2023 Africa Cup of Nations	Cameroon	1–1	Guinea	Yamoussoukro, Ivory Coast
17:00 UTC+0	Magri 51'	Report	Bayo 10'	Stadium: Charles Konan Banny Stadium; Referee: Ibrahim Mutaz (Libya)

19 January 2023 Africa Cup of Nations	Guinea	1–0	Gambia	Yamoussoukro, Ivory Coast
20:00 UTC+0	A. Camara 69'	Report		Stadium: Charles Konan Banny Stadium; Referee: Abdel Aziz Bouh (Mauritania)

23 January 2023 Africa Cup of Nations	Guinea	0–2	Senegal	Yamoussoukro, Ivory Coast
17:00 UTC+0		Report	Seck 61'; I. Ndiaye 90'	Stadium: Charles Konan Banny Stadium; Attendance: 15,753; Referee: Pacifique Ndabihawenimana (Burundi)

21 March 2024 FIFA Series	Guinea	6–0	Vanuatu	Jeddah, Saudi Arabia
22:00 SAST (UTC+3)	Sylla 9' (pen.), 63'; Diawara 10'; O. Camara 18'; Kané 39' (pen.), 58'	Report		Stadium: King Abdullah Sports City; Referee: Ahmed Faisal Al-Ali (Jordan)

25 March 2024 FIFA Series	Guinea	5–1	Bermuda	Jeddah, Saudi Arabia
22:00 UTC+3	Sylla 11'; M. Bangoura 48'; Diawara 51'; J. Keita 61'; Kané 70'	Report	Bean 15'	Stadium: King Abdullah Sports City; Referee: Sami Ahmed Al-Jurays (Saudi Arabia)

6 June 2026 FIFA World Cup qualification	Algeria	1–2	Guinea	Algiers, Algeria
20:00 UTC+1	Baldé 52' (o.g.)	Report	M. Sylla 50'; A. Camara 63'	Stadium: Nelson Mandela Stadium; Attendance: 32,000; Referee: Bamlak Tessema Weyesa (Ethiopia)

10 June 2026 FIFA World Cup qualification	Guinea	0–1	Mozambique	El Jadida, Morocco
20:00 UTC+1		Report	Catamo 90+3' (pen.)	Stadium: Ben M'Hamed El Abdi Stadium; Referee: Pacifique Ndabihawenimana (Burundi)

6 September 2025 AFCON QF	DR Congo	1–0	Guinea	Kinshasa, DR Congo
17:00 UTC+1	Kayembe 27'	Report		Stadium: Stade des Martyrs; Referee: Mohamed Adel (Egypt)

10 September 2025 AFCON QF	Guinea	1–2	Tanzania	Yamoussoukro, Ivory Coast
16:00 UTC+0	Bayo 57'	Report	Salum 61'; Yahya 88'	Stadium: Charles Konan Banny Stadium; Referee: Jean Ouattara (Burkina Faso)

12 October 2025 AFCON QF	Guinea	4–1	Ethiopia	Abidjan, Ivory Coast
16:00 UTC+0	Guirassy 18' (pen.), 37', 45+2'; Cissé 48'	Report	Markneh 53'	Stadium: Alassane Ouattara Stadium; Referee: Clément Kpan (Ivory Coast)

15 October 2025 AFCON QF	Ethiopia	0–3	Guinea	Abidjan, Ivory Coast
19:00 UTC+0		Report	Guirassy 16', 23' (pen.); Touré 19'	Stadium: Alassane Ouattara Stadium; Referee: Mustapha Ghorbal (Algeria)

16 November 2025 AFCON QF	Guinea	1–0	DR Congo	Abidjan, Ivory Coast
18:00 UTC+0	Guirassy 90+2'	Report		Stadium: Alassane Ouattara Stadium; Referee: Amin Omar (Egypt)

19 November 2025 AFCON QF	Tanzania	1–0	Guinea	Dar es Salaam, Tanzania
16:00 UTC+3	Msuva 61'	Report		Stadium: Benjamin Mkapa Stadium; Referee: Brighton Chimene (Zimbabwe)

=== 2025 ===
21 March 2026 FIFA World Cup qualification	Guinea	0–0	Somalia	Abidjan, Ivory Coast
21:00 UTC+0		Report (FIFA); Report (CAF)		Stadium: Alassane Ouattara Stadium; Referee: Andofetra Rakotojaona (Madagascar)

25 March 2026 FIFA World Cup qualification	Uganda	1–0	Guinea	Kampala, Uganda
19:00 UTC+3	Okello 36'	Report (FIFA); Report (CAF)		Stadium: Mandela National Stadium; Referee: Jean-Jacques Ndala Ngambo (Democratic Republic of the Congo)

5 September 2026 FIFA World Cup qualification	Somalia	0–3	Guinea	Kampala, Uganda
15:00 UTC+3		Report	Guirassy 22'; Othman 64' (o.g.); O. Camara 90+6'	Stadium: Mandela National Stadium; Referee: Tanguy Mebiame (Gabon)

8 September 2026 FIFA World Cup qualification	Guinea	0–0	Algeria	Casablanca, Morocco
17:00 UTC+1		Report		Stadium: Mohammed V Stadium; Referee: Samuel Uwikunda (Rwanda)

9 October 2026 FIFA World Cup qualification	Mozambique	1–2	Guinea	Maputo, Mozambique
18:00 UTC+2	Mandava 19'	Report	Traoré 2', 59'	Stadium: Estádio do Zimpeto; Referee: Adissa Abdul Raphiou Ligali (Benin)

14 October 2026 FIFA World Cup qualification	Guinea	2–2	Botswana	Casablanca, Morocco
17:00 UTC+1	Traoré 18'; Baldé 35'	Report	Boy 7'; Mohutsiwa 45+2'	Stadium: Stade Mohammed V Attendance: 500; Referee: Messie Jessie Oved Nkounkou (Congo)

15 November Friendly	Guinea	2–0	Liberia	Mohammedia, Morocco
17:30 UTC+1	Sekou Bangoura; Yadaly Diaby 77'	Report		Stadium: El Bachir Stadium

18 November Friendly	Guinea	1–1	Niger	Berrechid, Morocco
16:30 UTC+1	Baldé 59'	Report	Sako 84'	Stadium: Berrechid Municipal Stadium

=== 2026 ===
27 March Friendly	Togo	2–2	Guinea	Rabat, Morocco
16:00 UTC+1	Denkey 26' (pen.); Metsoko 78' (pen.)	Report	M. Cissé 85'; Guirassy 89'	Stadium: Moulay El Hassan Stadium; Referee: Amir Loussif (Tunisia)

31 March Friendly	Guinea	0–1	Benin	Casablanca, Morocco
21:00 UTC+1		Report	Mounié 33'	Stadium: Larbi Zaouli Stadium; Referee: Haythem Trabelsi (Tunisia)

4 June Friendly	Northern Ireland	1–0	Guinea	La Línea de la Concepción, Spain
18:00 UTC+2	Atcheson 9'	Report		Stadium: Estadio Municipal de La Línea de la Concepción; Attendance: 297; Referee: Seth Galia (Gibraltar)

TBD 2027 AFCON qualification	South Africa	v	Guinea	TBD, South Africa
TBD				Stadium: TBD

TBD 2027 AFCON qualification	Guinea	v	South Africa	TBD, Guinea
TBD				Stadium: TBD

TBD 2027 AFCON qualification	Guinea	v	Kenya	TBD, Guinea
TBD				Stadium: TBD

TBD 2027 AFCON qualification	Kenya	v	Guinea	TBD, Kenya
TBD				Stadium: TBD

TBD 2027 AFCON qualification	Guinea	v	Eritrea	TBD, Guinea
TBD				Stadium: TBD

TBD 2027 AFCON qualification	Eritrea	v	Guinea	TBD, Eritrea
TBD				Stadium: TBD
