= Mali national football team results (2020–present) =

This article provides details of international football games played by the Mali national football team from 2020 to present.

== Results ==
Key
Win
Draw
Defeat

=== 2020 ===
9 October 2020 Friendly	Mali	3–0	Ghana	Side, Turkey
20:00 UTC+3	H. Traoré 3'; E. Touré 49'; Haidara 75'	Report		Stadium: Emirhan Sport Center Stadium; Referee: Halil Meler (Turkey)

13 October 2020 Friendly	Mali	Cancelled	Iran	Side, Turkey
17:00 UTC+3		Report		Stadium: Emirhan Sport Center Stadium

13 November 2020 2021 AFCONQ	Mali	1–0	Namibia	Bamako, Mali
19:00 UTC+0	Touré 33' (pen.)	Report		Stadium: Stade du 26 Mars; Referee: Mohamed Ali Moussa (Niger)

17 November 2020 2021 AFCONQ	Namibia	1–2	Mali	Windhoek, Namibia
19:00 UTC+2	Kambindu 39'	Report	Koïta 12'; Doumbia 37'	Stadium: Sam Nujoma Stadium; Referee: Ali Mohamed Adelaid (Comoros)

=== 2021 ===
16 January 2021 2020 CHAN	Mali	1–0	Burkina Faso	Yaoundé, Cameroon
20:00	Bagayoko 70'	Report		Stadium: Stade Ahmadou Ahidjo; Referee: Mohamed Marouf (Egypt)

20 January 2021 2020 CHAN	Cameroon	1–1	Mali	Yaoundé, Cameroon
17:00	Banga 6'	Report	Samaké 12'	Stadium: Stade Ahmadou Ahidjo; Referee: Pacifque Ndabihawenimana (Burundi)

24 January 2021 2020 CHAN	Zimbabwe	0–1	Mali	Douala, Cameroon
20:00		Report	Diallo 11'	Stadium: Japoma Stadium; Referee: Beida Dahane (Mauritania)

30 January 2021 2020 CHAN	Mali	0–0 (a.e.t.) (5–4 p)	Congo	Yaoundé, Cameroon
17:00		Report		Stadium: Stade Ahmadou Ahidjo; Referee: Peter Waweru Kamaku (Kenya)
	Penalties
	Samake (penalty scored); Kyabou (penalty scored); Samabali (penalty scored); Doumba (penalty scored); Coulibaly (penalty scored)		(penalty missed) Mapata; (penalty scored) Ondongo; (penalty scored) Binguila; (penalty scored) Mokombo; (penalty scored) Ndzila

3 February 2021 2020 CHAN	Mali	0–0 (a.e.t.) (5–4 p)	Guinea	Douala, Cameroon
16:00		Report		Stadium: Japoma Stadium; Referee: Mahmoud El Banna (Egypt)
	Penalties
	Samake (penalty scored); Kyabou (penalty scored); Samabali (penalty scored); Kanoute (penalty scored); Coulibaly (penalty scored)		(penalty scored) Barry; (penalty scored) Camara; (penalty scored) Camara; (penalty scored) Bangoura; (penalty missed) Sylla

7 February 2021 2020 CHAN	Mali	0–2	Morocco	Yaoundé, Cameroon
20:00		Report	Bouftini 68'; El Kaabi 79'	Stadium: Stade Ahmadou Ahidjo; Referee: Peter Waweru (Kenya)

24 March 2021 2021 AFCONQ	Guinea	1–0	Mali	Conakry, Guinea
16:00	Soumah 76'	Report		Stadium: General Lansana Conté Stadium; Referee: Youssef Essrayri (Tunisia)

28 March 2021 2021 AFCONQ	Mali	3–0; Awarded	Chad	Mali

6 June 2021 Friendly	Algeria	1–0	Mali	Blida, Algeria
20:45 UTC+1	Mahrez 56'	Report		Stadium: Mustapha Tchaker Stadium; Referee: Ahmed El Ghandour (Egypt)

11 June 2021 Friendly	DR Congo	1–1	Mali	Tunis, Tunisia
16:00 UTC+1	Malango 86'	Report	Coulibaly 4'	Stadium: Stade El Menzah; Attendance: 0

15 June 2021 Friendly	Tunisia	1–0	Mali	Radès, Tunisia
20:30 UTC+1	Ben Slimane 90'	Report		Stadium: Stade Olympique de Radès; Referee: Ibrahim Nour El Din (Egypt)

1 September 2021 2022 World Cup qualification	Mali	1–0	Rwanda	Agadir, Morocco
20:00 UTC+1	A. M. Traoré 19'	Report		Stadium: Stade Adrar; Referee: Beida Dahane (Mauritania)

6 September 2021 2022 World Cup qualification	Uganda	0–0	Mali	Entebbe, Uganda
16:00 UTC+3		Report		Stadium: St. Mary's Stadium-Kitende; Referee: Ahmad Imtehaz Heeralall (Mauritius)

7 October 2021 2022 World Cup qualification	Mali	5–0	Kenya	Agadir, Morocco
20:00 UTC+1	A. Traoré 8'; Koné 22', 36', 45' (pen.); Doumbia 85'	Report		Stadium: Stade Adrar; Referee: Youssef Essrayri (Tunisia)

10 October 2021 2022 World Cup qualification	Kenya	0–1	Mali	Nairobi, Kenya
16:00 UTC+3		Report	Koné 55'	Stadium: Nyayo National Stadium; Referee: Blaise Yuven Ngwa (Cameroon)

11 November 2021 2022 World Cup qualification	Rwanda	0–3	Mali	Kigali, Rwanda
18:00 UTC+2		Report	Djenepo 19'; Koné 21'; K. Coulibaly 87'	Stadium: Nyamirambo Regional Stadium; Referee: Hélder Martins de Carvalho (Angola)

14 November 2021 2022 World Cup qualification	Mali	1–0	Uganda	Agadir, Morocco
17:00 UTC+1	K. Coulibaly 18'	Report		Stadium: Stade Adrar; Referee: Bamlak Tessema Weyesa (Ethiopia)

=== 2022 ===
12 January 2022 2021 AFCON GS	Tunisia	0–1	Mali	Limbe, Cameroon
14:00 UTC+1		Report	Koné 48' (pen.)	Stadium: Limbe Stadium; Referee: Janny Sikazwe (Zambia)

16 January 2022 2021 AFCON GS	Gambia	1–1	Mali	Limbe, Cameroon
14:00 UTC+1	Mu. Barrow 90' (pen.)	Report	Koné 79' (pen.)	Stadium: Limbe Stadium; Referee: Samir Guezzaz (Morocco)

20 January 2022 2021 AFCON GS	Mali	2–0	Mauritania	Douala, Cameroon
20:00 UTC+1	M. Haïdara 2'; Koné 49' (pen.)	Report		Stadium: Japoma Stadium; Referee: Bernard Camille (Seychelles)

26 January 2022 2021 AFCON R16	Mali	0–0 (a.e.t.) (5–6 p)	Equatorial Guinea	Limbe, Cameroon
20:00 UTC+1		Report		Stadium: Limbe Stadium; Referee: Bakary Gassama (Gambia)
	Penalties
	A. N. Traoré (penalty scored); Djenepo (penalty scored); M. Haïdara (penalty missed); Hama. Traoré (penalty missed); Touré (penalty scored); Dieng (penalty scored); Camara (penalty scored); Sacko (penalty missed)		(penalty missed) E. Nsue; (penalty scored) Belima; (penalty scored) Akapo; (penalty scored) Buyla; (penalty missed) Ganet; (penalty scored) Coco; (penalty scored) Salvador; (penalty scored) Eneme

25 March 2022 2022 World Cup qualification	Mali	0–1	Tunisia	Bamako, Mali
17:00 UTC+0		Report	Sissako 36' (o.g.)	Stadium: Stade du 26 Mars; Referee: Bamlak Tessema Weyesa (Ethiopia)

29 March 2022 2022 World Cup qualification	Tunisia	0–0 (1–0 agg.)	Mali	Tunis, Tunisia
20:30 UTC+1		Report		Stadium: Stade Hammadi Agrebi; Referee: Maguette N'Diaye (Senegal)

4 June 2022 2023 AFCON Q	Mali	4–0	Congo	Bamako, Mali
19:00 UTC+0	Camara 1'; Touré 11', 40'; Coulibaly 44'	Report		Stadium: Stade du 26 Mars; Referee: Abdel Aziz Bouh (Mauritania)

9 June 2022 2023 AFCON Q	South Sudan	1–3	Mali	Entebbe, Uganda
15:00 UTC+3	Kouyaté 29' (o.g.)	Report	Camara 59'; Koïta 90+3'; Dieng 90+5'	Stadium: St. Mary's Stadium-Kitende; Referee: Mashood Ssali (Uganda)

23 September 2022 Friendly	Mali	1–0	Zambia	Bamako, Mali
19:00 UTC+0	Touré 6'	Report		Stadium: Stade du 26 Mars; Referee: Younoussa Tawel Camara (Guinea)

26 September 2022 Friendly	Mali	Abandoned	Zambia	Bamako, Mali
19:00 UTC+0				Stadium: Stade du 26 Mars
Note: The match was stopped after only 16 minutes due to heavy rain and was eventually abandoned.

16 November 2022 Friendly	Algeria	1–1	Mali	Bir El Djir, Oran, Algeria
20:30 UTC+1	Mahrez 45+1' (pen.)	Report	Haïdara 58'	Stadium: Miloud Hadefi Stadium; Attendance: 20,000; Referee: Amir Lousif (Tunisia)

=== 2023 ===
24 March 2023 2023 AFCON qualification	Mali	2–0	Gambia	Bamako, Mali
19:00 UTC+0	K. Doumbia 3'; A. Traoré 90+5'	Report		Stadium: Stade du 26 Mars; Referee: Jean Ouattara (Burkina Faso)

28 March 2023 2023 AFCON qualification	Gambia	1–0	Mali	Casablanca, Morocco
16:00 UTC+0	O. Colley 79'	Report		Stadium: Stade Mohamed V Referee: Kouassi Attisso Attiogbe (Togo)

18 June 2023 2023 AFCON qualification	Congo	0–2	Mali	Brazzaville, Congo
17:00 UTC+1		Report	Koné 62'; Nene 73'	Stadium: Stade Alphonse Massemba-Débat; Referee: Samir Guezzaz (Morocco)

8 September 2023 2023 AFCON qualification	Mali	4–0	South Sudan	Bamako, Mali
19:00 UTC+0	Koné 10'; K. Doumbia 29', 57'; Samassekou (yellow card) 71'; Nene 82'	Report	Toha (yellow card) 74'	Stadium: Stade du 26 Mars; Referee: Mehrez Melki (Tunisia)

13 October 2023 Friendly	Mali	1–0	Uganda	Bamako, Mali
	Sinayoko 73' (pen.)	Report		Stadium: Stade du 26 Mars

17 October 2023 Friendly	Saudi Arabia	1–3	Mali	Portimão, Portugal
	S. Al-Dawsari 58'	Report	M. Doumbia 14'; H. Traoré 42'; Sinayoko 71'	Stadium: Estádio Municipal de Portimão

17 November 2023 2026 World Cup Qualification	Mali	3–1	Chad	Bamako, Mali
19:00 UTC+0	Doumbia 45'; Niakaté 77'; I. Sissoko 81'	Report	Mouandilmadji 53'	Stadium: Stade du 26 Mars; Referee: Ahmad Heeralall (Mauritania)

20 November 2023 2026 World Cup Qualification	Mali	1–1	Central African Republic	Bamako, Mali
19:00 UTC+3	Doumbia 76'	Report	Kondogbia 79'	Stadium: Stade du 26 Mars; Attendance: 30,000; Referee: Georges Gatogato (Burundi)

=== 2024 ===
6 January Friendly	Mali	6–2	Guinea-Bissau	Bamako, Mali
19:00 UTC+0	Y. Niakaté 6'; L. Coulibaly 15'; K. Doumbia 40'; S. Niakaté 68'; Sacko 75'; Sinayoko 85'	Report	Mam. Baldé 37'; C. Mané 42'	Stadium: Stade du 26 Mars

16 January 2023 AFCON GS	Mali	2–0	South Africa	Korhogo, Ivory Coast
20:00 UTC+0	H. Traoré 60'; Sinayoko 66'	Report		Stadium: Amadou Gon Coulibaly Stadium; Attendance: 16,894; Referee: Mohamed Adel (Egypt)

20 January 2023 AFCON GS	Tunisia	1–1	Mali	Korhogo, Ivory Coast
20:00 UTC+0	Rafia 20'	Report	Sinayoko 10'	Stadium: Amadou Gon Coulibaly Stadium; Attendance: 18,130; Referee: Daniel Nii Laryea (Ghana)

24 January 2023 AFCON GS	Namibia	0–0	Mali	San-Pédro, Ivory Coast
17:00 UTC+0		Report		Stadium: Laurent Pokou Stadium; Attendance: 15,231; Referee: Samuel Uwikunda (Rwanda)

30 January 2023 AFCON R16	Mali	2–1	Burkina Faso	Korhogo, Ivory Coast
17:00	E. Tapsoba 3' (o.g.); Sinayoko 47'	Report	Traoré 57' (pen.)	Stadium: Amadou Gon Coulibaly Stadium; Attendance: 19,184; Referee: Ibrahim Mutaz (Libya)

3 February 2023 AFCON QF	Mali	1–2 (a.e.t.)	Ivory Coast	Bouaké, Ivory Coast
17:00	Nene 71'	Report	Adingra 90'; Diakité 120+2'	Stadium: Stade de la Paix; Attendance: 39,836; Referee: Mohamed Adel (Egypt)

22 March Friendly	Mauritania	0–2	Mali	Marrakesh, Morocco
19:00 UTC+0		Report		Stadium: Stade de Marrakech

26 March Friendly	Nigeria	0–2	Mali	Marrakesh, Morocco
19:00 UTC+0		Report	Touré 18'; K. Doumbia 87'	Stadium: Stade de Marrakech; Referee: Samir Guezzaz (Morocco)

6 June 2026 World Cup Qualification	Mali	1–2	Ghana	Bamako, Mali
19:00 UTC+0	K. Doumbia 45+1'	Report	Nuamah 58'; J. Ayew 90+4'	Stadium: Stade du 26 Mars; Attendance: 50,200; Referee: Amin Omar (Egypt)

11 June 2026 World Cup Qualification	Madagascar	0–0	Mali	Johannesburg, South Africa
15:00 UTC+2		Report		Stadium: FNB Stadium; Referee: Patrice Tanguy Mebiame (Gabon)

6 September 2025 Africa Cup of Nations qualification	Mali	1–1	Mozambique	Bamako, Mali
19:00 UTC+0	Bissouma 52'	Report	Catamo 37'	Stadium: Stade du 26 Mars; Attendance: 49,000; Referee: Alhadi Allaou Mahamat (Chad)

10 September 2025 Africa Cup of Nations qualification	Eswatini	0–1	Mali	Mbombela, South Africa
15:00 UTC+2		Report	Bissouma 7'	Stadium: Mbombela Stadium; Attendance: 406; Referee: Jean-Claude Ishimwe (Rwanda)

11 October 2025 Africa Cup of Nations qualification	Mali	1–0	Guinea-Bissau	Bamako, Mali
19:00 UTC+0	Touré 62'	Report		Stadium: Stade du 26 Mars; Referee: Samuel Uwikunda (Rwanda)

15 October 2025 Africa Cup of Nations qualification	Guinea-Bissau	0–0	Mali	Bissau, Guinea-Bissau
16:00 UTC+0		Report		Stadium: Estádio 24 de Setembro; Referee: Jean Ouattara (Burkina Faso)

15 November 2025 Africa Cup of Nations qualification	Mozambique	0–1	Mali	Maputo, Mozambique
17:00 UTC+2		Report	Doumbia 19'	Stadium: Estádio do Zimpeto; Referee: Dickens Mimisa (Kenya)

19 November 2025 Africa Cup of Nations qualification	Mali	6–0	Eswatini	Bamako, Mali
15:00 UTC+0	Touré 7'; Nene 17', 23', 76'; K.Doumbia 42'; M.Doumbia 89'	Report		Stadium: Stade du 26 Mars; Attendance: 8,000; Referee: Mohamed Ali Moussa

=== 2025 ===
20 March 2026 World Cup Qualification	Comoros	0–3	Mali	Berkane, Morocco
22:00 UTC+1		Report	Nene 20'; Doumbia 55', 63'	Stadium: Berkane Municipal Stadium; Referee: Mahmood Ali Mahmood Ismail (Sudan)

24 March 2026 World Cup Qualification	Central African Republic	0–0	Mali	Casablanca, Morocco
17:00 UTC+1		Report		Stadium: Larbi Zaouli Stadium; Referee: Godfrey Nkhakananga (Malawi

5 June Friendly	DR Congo	1–0	Mali	Orléans, France
20:00 UTC+1				Stadium: Stade de la Source

4 September 2026 World Cup Qualification	Mali	3–0	Comoros	Berkane, Morocco
19:00 UTC+0	Nene 45'; K. Doumbia 70' (pen.); Coulibaly 76'	Report		Stadium: Berkane Municipal Stadium; Referee: Jalal Jayed (Morocco)

8 September 2026 World Cup Qualification	Ghana	1–0	Mali	Accra, Ghana
19:00 UTC+0	Djiku 49'	Report		Stadium: Accra Sports Stadium; Referee: Luxolo Badi (South Africa)

8 October 2026 World Cup Qualification	Chad	0–2	Mali	N'Djamena, Chad
17:00 UTC+1		Report	K. Doumbia 19', 74'	Stadium: Stade Olympique Maréchal Idriss Déby Itno; Referee: Lebalang Mokete (Lesotho)

12 October 2026 World Cup Qualification	Mali	4–1	Madagascar	Bamako, Mali
19:00 UTC+0	Sinayoko 10', 64'; Nene 39'; G. Diarra 90+5'	Report	N'Zi 90'	Stadium: Stade du 26 Mars; Attendance: 3,000; Referee: Georges Gatogato (Burundi)

18 November Friendly	Jordan	0–0	Mali	Tunis, Tunisia
20:30 UTC+1		Report		Stadium: Hammadi Agrebi Stadium; Referee: Nidhal Ben Ltaief (Tunisia)

22 December 2025 AFCON Group A	Mali	1–1	Zambia	Casablanca, Morocco
15:00 UTC+1	Sinayoko 61'	Report	Daka 90+2'	Stadium: Mohammed V Stadium; Attendance: 10,124; Referee: Omar Artan (Somalia)

26 December 2025 AFCON Group A	Morocco	1–1	Mali	Rabat, Morocco
21:00 UTC+1	Díaz 45+5' (pen.)	Report	Sinayoko 64' (pen.)	Stadium: Prince Moulay Abdellah Stadium; Attendance: 63,844; Referee: Abdou Mefire (Cameroon)

29 December 2025 AFCON Group A	Comoros	0–0	Mali	Casablanca, Morocco
20:00 UTC+1		Report	Haidara (red card) 88'	Stadium: Mohammed V Stadium; Attendance: 8,842; Referee: Alhadji Allaou Mahamat (Chad)

=== 2026 ===
3 January 2025 AFCON R16	Mali	1–1 (a.e.t.) (3–2 p)	Tunisia	Casablanca, Morocco
20:00 UTC+1	W. Coulibaly (red card) 26'; Sinayoko 90+6' (pen.)	Report	Chaouat 88'	Stadium: Mohammed V Stadium; Attendance: 41,982; Referee: Abongile Tom (South Africa)
	Penalties
	Bissouma (penalty missed); Sinayoko (penalty scored); Dorgeles (penalty missed); Diakité (penalty scored); Touré (penalty scored)		(penalty scored) Meriah; (penalty missed) Abdi; (penalty scored) Saad; (penalty missed) Achouri; (penalty missed) Ben Romdhane

9 January 2025 AFCON QF	Mali	0–1	Senegal	Tangier, Morocco
17:00 UTC+1	Bissouma (yellow card) 23' (yellow-red card) 45+3'	Report	I. Ndiaye 27'	Stadium: Tangier Grand Stadium; Attendance: 32,385; Referee: Abongile Tom (South Africa)

31 March Friendly	Russia	0–0	Mali	Saint Petersburg, Russia
20:00 UTC+3		Report		Stadium: Krestovsky Stadium; Attendance: 34,837; Referee: Rustam Lutfullin (Uzbekistan)

4 June Friendly	Iran	2–0	Mali	Antalya, Turkiye
17:30	Ezatolahi 12'; Rezaeian 55'			Stadium: Mardan Sports Complex
