= Cameroon national football team results (2020–present) =

This article provides details of international football games played by the Cameroon national team from 2020 to present.

== Results ==
Key
Win
Draw
Defeat

=== 2020 ===
9 October 2020 Friendly	Japan	0–0	Cameroon	Utrecht, Netherlands
14:00 UTC+2		Report		Stadium: Stadion Galgenwaard; Referee: Bas Nijhuis (Netherlands)

13 October 2020 Friendly	Cameroon	0–0	South Sudan	Yaoundé, Cameroon
16:00 UTC+1				Stadium: Stade Ahmadou Ahidjo

12 November 2020 2021 AFCON Q	Cameroon	4–1	Mozambique	Douala, Cameroon
17:00 UTC+1	Aboubakar 38', 47'; Zambo Anguissa 56'; N'Jie 80'	Report	Kamo-Kamo 74'	Stadium: Stade de la Réunification; Referee: Kalilou Traore Ibrahim (Ivory Coast)

16 November 2020 2021 AFCON Q	Mozambique	0–2	Cameroon	Maputo, Mozambique
18:00 UTC+2		Report	Aboubakar 26'; Tabekou 73'	Stadium: Estádio do Zimpeto; Referee: Bernard Camille (Seychelles)

=== 2021 ===
16 January 2021 2020 CHAN	Cameroon	1–0	Zimbabwe	Yaoundé, Cameroon
17:00	Banga 72'	Report		Stadium: Stade Ahmadou Ahidjo; Attendance: 0 Referee: Jean-Jacques Ndala (DR Congo)

20 January 2021 2020 CHAN	Cameroon	1–1	Mali	Yaoundé, Cameroon
17:00	Banga 6'	Report	Samaké 12'	Stadium: Stade Ahmadou Ahidjo; Referee: Pacifque Ndabihawenimana (Burundi)

24 January 2021 2020 CHAN	Burkina Faso	0–0	Cameroon	Yaoundé, Cameroon
20:00		Report		Stadium: Stade Ahmadou Ahidjo; Referee: Sadok Selmi (Tunisia)

30 January 2021 2020 CHAN	DR Congo	1–2	Cameroon	Douala, Cameroon
20:00	Lilepo 22'	Report	N'Djeng 29'; Felix Oukiné 42'	Stadium: Japoma Stadium; Referee: Mohamed Maarouf Eid Mansour (Egypt)

3 February 2021 2020 CHAN	Morocco	4–0	Cameroon	Limbe, Cameroon
20:00	Bouftini 29'; Rahimi 40', 74'; Ali Bemammer 82'	Report		Stadium: Limbe Stadium; Referee: Jean-Jacques Ndala (DR Congo)

6 February 2021 2020 CHAN	Guinea	2–0	Cameroon	Douala, Cameroon
20:00	Sylla 9'; Bangoura 45+1'	Report		Stadium: Stade de la Réunification; Referee: Lahlou Benbraham (Algeria)

26 March 2021 2021 AFCONQ	Cape Verde	3–1	Cameroon	Praia, Cape Verde
15:00 UTC−1	Kuca 25'; Bagnack 59' (o.g.); Mendes 69'	Report	Kunde 14'	Stadium: Estádio Nacional de Cabo Verde; Referee: Lahlou Benbraham (Algeria)

30 March 2021 2021 AFCONQ	Cameroon	0–0	Rwanda	Douala, Cameroon
20:00 UTC+1		Report		Stadium: Japoma Stadium; Referee: Mohamed Ali Moussa (Niger)

4 June 2021 Friendly	Nigeria	0–1	Cameroon	Wiener Neustadt, Austria
21:30 UTC+2		Report	Zambo Anguissa 37'	Stadium: Stadion Wiener Neustadt; Attendance: 0 Referee: Harald Lechner (Austria)

8 June 2021 Friendly	Cameroon	0–0	Nigeria	Wiener Neustadt, Austria
18:00 UTC+2		Report		Stadium: Stadion Wiener Neustadt; Attendance: 0 Referee: Manuel Schüttengruber (Austria)

3 September 2021 2022 World Cup qualification	Cameroon	2–0	Malawi	Yaoundé, Cameroon
20:00 UTC+1	Aboubakar 9'; Ngadeu-Ngadjui 22'	Report		Stadium: Paul Biya Stadium; Referee: Jean-Jacques Ndala (Democratic Republic of the Congo)

6 September 2021 2022 World Cup qualification	Ivory Coast	2–1	Cameroon	Abidjan, Ivory Coast
19:00 UTC+0	Haller 20' (pen.), 29'	Report	Ngamaleu 61' (pen.)	Stadium: Stade Olympique Alassane Ouattara; Referee: Mehdi Abid Charef (Algeria)

8 October 2021 2022 World Cup qualification	Cameroon	3–1	Mozambique	Douala, Cameroon
17:00 UTC+1	Choupo-Moting 28', 51'; Toko Ekambi 63'	Report	Catamo 81'	Stadium: Japoma Stadium; Referee: Mohamed Marouf (Egypt)

11 October 2021 2022 World Cup qualification	Mozambique	0–1	Cameroon	Tangiers, Morocco
14:00 UTC+1		Report	Ngadeu-Ngadjui 68'	Stadium: Stade Ibn Batouta; Referee: Sabri Mohamed Fadul (Sudan)

13 November 2021 2022 World Cup qualification	Malawi	0–4	Cameroon	Johannesburg, South Africa
15:00 UTC+2		Report	Aboubakar 22' (pen.); Zambo Anguissa 42'; Bassogog 85', 87'	Stadium: Orlando Stadium; Referee: Issa Sy (Senegal)

16 November 2021 2022 World Cup qualification	Cameroon	1–0	Ivory Coast	Douala, Cameroon
20:00 UTC+1	Toko Ekambi 21'	Report		Stadium: Japoma Stadium; Referee: Janny Sikazwe (Zambia)

=== 2022 ===
9 January 2022 2021 AFCON GS	Cameroon	2–1	Burkina Faso	Yaoundé, Cameroon
17:00 UTC+1	Aboubakar 40' (pen.), 45+3' (pen.)	Report	Sangaré 24'	Stadium: Olembe Stadium; Referee: Mustapha Ghorbal (Algeria)

13 January 2022 2021 AFCON GS	Cameroon	4–1	Ethiopia	Yaoundé, Cameroon
17:00 UTC+1	Toko Ekambi 8', 68'; Aboubakar 53', 55'	Report	Hotessa 4'	Stadium: Olembe Stadium; Referee: Jean-Jacques Ndala (DR Congo)

17 January 2022 2021 AFCON GS	Cape Verde	1–1	Cameroon	Yaoundé, Cameroon
17:00 UTC+1	Rodrigues 53'	Report	Aboubakar 39'	Stadium: Olembe Stadium; Referee: Sadok Selmi (Tunisia)

24 January 2022 2021 AFCON R16	Cameroon	2–1	Comoros	Yaoundé, Cameroon
20:00 UTC+1	Toko Ekambi 29'; Aboubakar 70'	Report	M'Changama 81'	Stadium: Olembe Stadium; Referee: Bamlak Tessema Weyesa (Ethiopia)

29 January 2022 2021 AFCON QF	Gambia	0–2	Cameroon	Douala, Cameroon
17:00 UTC+1		Report	Toko Ekambi 50', 57'	Stadium: Japoma Stadium; Referee: Pacifique Ndabihawenimana (Burundi)

3 February 2022 2021 AFCON SF	Cameroon	0–0 (a.e.t.) (1–3 p)	Egypt	Yaoundé, Cameroon
20:00 UTC+1		Report		Stadium: Olembe Stadium; Referee: Bakary Gassama (Gambia)
	Penalties
	Aboubakar (penalty scored); Moukoudi (penalty missed); Léa Siliki (penalty missed); N'Jie (penalty missed)		(penalty scored) Zizo; (penalty scored) Abdelmonem; (penalty scored) Lasheen

5 February 2022 2021 AFCON 3rd	Burkina Faso	3–3 (3–5 p)	Cameroon	Yaoundé, Cameroon
20:00 UTC+1 (Note: The match was originally due to be held on 6 February 2022 at 17:00, but was rescheduled due to security and convenience reasons.)	Yago 24'; Onana 43' (o.g.); O. Ouattara 49'	Report	Bahoken 71'; Aboubakar 85', 87'	Stadium: Ahmadou Ahidjo Stadium; Referee: Rédouane Jiyed (Morocco)
	Penalties
	Kaboré (penalty scored); S. Ouattara (penalty scored); Touré (penalty missed); Yago (penalty scored)		(penalty scored) Aboubakar; (penalty scored) Ngamaleu; (penalty scored) Toko Ekambi; (penalty scored) Kunde; (penalty scored) Oyongo

25 March 2022 2022 World Cup qualification	Cameroon	0–1	Algeria	Douala, Cameroon
18:00 UTC+1		Report	Slimani 40'	Stadium: Japoma Stadium; Attendance: 50,000; Referee: Joshua Bondo (Botswana)

29 March 2022 2022 World Cup qualification	Algeria	1–2 (a.e.t.) (2–2 (a) agg.)	Cameroon	Blida, Algeria
20:30 UTC+1	Touba 118'	Report	Choupo-Moting 22'; Toko Ekambi 120+4'	Stadium: Mustapha Tchaker Stadium; Referee: Bakary Gassama (Gambia)

4 June 2022 2023 AFCON Q	Cameroon	Cancelled	Kenya	Douala, Cameroon
17:00 UTC+1				Stadium: Japoma Stadium
Note: FIFA banned Kenya due to governmental interference in their Football Association.

8 June 2022 2023 AFCON Q	Burundi	0–1	Cameroon	Dar es Salaam, Tanzania
16:00 UTC+3		Report	Toko Ekambi 30'	Stadium: National Stadium; Referee: Souleiman Ahmed Djama (Djibouti)

28 August 2022 2022 CHAN qualification	Equatorial Guinea	1–0	Cameroon	Equatorial Guinea
	Pedro Oba 23'

4 September 2022 2022 CHAN qualification	Cameroon	2–0 (2–1 agg.)	Equatorial Guinea	Cameroon
	Kaiba 42'; Marou 44'

23 September 2022 Friendly	Uzbekistan	2–0	Cameroon	Goyang, South Korea
15:00 UTC+9	Erkinov 24'; Urunov 76'	Report		Stadium: Goyang Stadium; Referee: Kim Woo-Sung (Korea)

27 September 2022 Friendly	South Korea	1–0	Cameroon	Seoul, South Korea
20:00 UTC+9	Son Heung-min 35'	Report		Stadium: Seoul World Cup Stadium; Attendance: 59,389; Referee: Alex King (Australia)

9 November 2022 Friendly	Cameroon	1–1	Jamaica	Yaoundé, Cameroon
17:00 UTC+1	Kaiba 75'	Report	McMaster 60'	Stadium: Olembe Stadium; Referee: Jean-Jacques Ndala (DR Congo)

18 November 2022 Friendly	Cameroon	1–1	Panama	Abu Dhabi, United Arab Emirates
13:00 UTC+4	Choupo-Moting 48'	Report	M. Murillo 55'	Stadium: Mohammed bin Zayed Stadium; Attendance: 1,500; Referee: Sultan Mohamed (United Arab Emirates)

24 November 2022 2022 World Cup GS	Switzerland	1–0	Cameroon	Al Wakrah, Qatar
13:00 UTC+3	Embolo 48'	Report		Stadium: Al Janoub Stadium; Attendance: 39,089; Referee: Facundo Tello (Argentina)

28 November 2022 2022 World Cup GS	Cameroon	3–3	Serbia	Al Wakrah, Qatar
13:00 UTC+3	Castelletto 29'; Aboubakar 63'; Choupo-Moting 66'	Report	Pavlović 45+1'; S. Milinković-Savić 45+3'; A. Mitrović 53'	Stadium: Al Janoub Stadium; Attendance: 39,789; Referee: Mohammed Abdulla Hassan Mohamed (United Arab Emirates)

2 December 2022 2022 World Cup GS	Cameroon	1–0	Brazil	Lusail, Qatar
22:00 UTC+3	Aboubakar 90+2'	Report		Stadium: Lusail Iconic Stadium; Attendance: 85,986; Referee: Ismail Elfath (United States)

=== 2023 ===
24 March 2023 AFCON qualification	Cameroon	1–1	Namibia	Yaoundé, Cameroon
21:30 UTC+1	Kemen 72'	Report	Shalulile 26'	Stadium: Ahmadou Ahidjo Stadium; Referee: Redouane Jiyed (Morocco)

28 March 2023 AFCON qualification	Namibia	2–1	Cameroon	Johannesburg, South Africa
15:00 UTC+2	Shalulile 55'; Iimbondi 79'	Report	Aboubakar 90+1'	Stadium: Dobsonville Stadium; Referee: Patrice Milazare (Mauritius)

June 2023 AFCON qualification	Kenya	Cancelled	Cameroon	Kenya
Note: FIFA banned Kenya due to governmental interference in their Football Association

10 June Friendly	Mexico	2–2	Cameroon	San Diego, United States
19:00 (UTC-7)	Reyes 45+2'; Álvarez 90+3'	Report	Mbeumo 37'; Toko Ekambi 61'	Stadium: Snapdragon Stadium; Referee: Kimbett Ward (Saint Kitts and Nevis)

12 September 2023 AFCON qualification	Cameroon	3–0	Burundi	Garoua, Cameroon
20:00 UTC+1	Mbeumo 46'; Wooh 59'; Aboubakar 90+3'	Report		Stadium: Roumdé Adjia Stadium; Referee: Abongile Tom (South Africa)

12 October Friendly	Russia	1–0	Cameroon	Moscow, Russia
--:-- UTC+3	Chalov 40'	Report		Stadium: VTB Arena; Attendance: 20,152; Referee: Khaled Saleh Al-Turais (Saudi Arabia)

16 October Friendly	Senegal	1–0	Cameroon	Lens, France
	Mané 35' (pen.)	Report		Stadium: Stade Bollaert-Delelis; Referee: Willy Delajod (France)

17 November 2026 World Cup qualification	Cameroon	3–0	Mauritius	Douala, Cameroon
20:00 UTC+1	Mbeumo 45+2'; N'Koudou 87'; Magri 90+2'	Report		Stadium: Japoma Stadium; Attendance: 25,000; Referee: Ahmed Arajiga (Tanzania)

21 November 2026 World Cup qualification	Libya	1–1	Cameroon	Benina, Libya
18:00 UTC+2	Aleiyan 43'	Report	Ntcham 34' (pen.)	Stadium: Benina Martyrs Stadium; Attendance: 13,450; Referee: Adissa Ligali (Benin)

=== 2024 ===
9 January Friendly	Zambia	1–1	Cameroon	Jeddah, Saudi Arabia
17:00 UTC+3	Daka 11'; Chilufya (yellow card) 15'; L. Banda (yellow card) 87'	Report	Yongwa 20'	Stadium: King Abdullah Sports City Stadium

15 January 2023 AFCON GS	Cameroon	1–1	Guinea	Yamoussoukro, Ivory Coast
17:00	Magri 51'	Report	Bayo 10'	Stadium: Charles Konan Banny Stadium; Attendance: 11,271; Referee: Mutaz Ibrahim (Libya)

19 January 2023 AFCON	Senegal	3–1	Cameroon	Yamoussoukro, Ivory Coast
	I. Sarr 16'; H. Diallo 71'; Mané 90+5'	Report	Castelletto 83'	Stadium: Charles Konan Banny Stadium; Attendance: 19,176; Referee: Mahmood Ismail (Sudan)

23 January 2023 AFCON	Gambia	2–3	Cameroon	Bouaké, Ivory Coast
17:00	Jallow 72'; E. Colley 85'	Report	Toko Ekambi 56'; Gomez 87' (o.g.); Wooh 90+1'	Stadium: Stade de la Paix; Attendance: 24,172; Referee: Bamlak Tessema Weyesa (Ethiopia)

27 January 2023 AFCON R16	Nigeria	2–0	Cameroon	Abidjan, Ivory Coast
	Lookman 36', 90'	Report		Stadium: Felix Houphouet Boigny Stadium; Attendance: 22,085; Referee: Rédouane Jiyed (Morocco)

8 June 2026 World Cup qualification	Cameroon	4–1	Cape Verde	Yaoundé, Cameroon
17:00 UTC+1	Ngadeu-Ngadjui 13'; Aboubakar 25', 44' (pen.); Nouhou 54'	Report	Monteiro 37'	Stadium: Stade Ahmadou Ahidjo; Referee: Mustapha Ghorbal (Algeria)

11 June 2026 World Cup qualification	Angola	1–1	Cameroon	Luanda, Angola
20:00 UTC+1	Ngadeu-Ngadjui 54' (o.g.)	Report	Mbeumo 11'	Stadium: Estádio 11 de Novembro; Referee: Mohamed Adel Elsaid (Egypt)

7 September 2024 2025 AFCON qualifier	Cameroon	1–0	Namibia	Garoua, Cameroon
17:00 UTC+1	Aboubakar 65'	Report		Stadium: Roumdé Adjia Stadium; Referee: Boubou Traoré (Mali)

10 September 2024 2025 AFCON qualifier	Zimbabwe	0–0	Cameroon	Kampala, Uganda
19:00 UTC+3		Report		Stadium: Mandela National Stadium; Referee: Mahmoud El Banna (Egypt)

11 October 2024 2025 AFCON qualifier	Cameroon	4–1	Kenya	Douala, Cameroon
--:--	Aboubakar 8' (pen.); Hongla 39'; Mbeumo 43'; Bassogog 55'	Report	Olunga 41'	Stadium: Japoma Stadium; Referee: Issa Sy (Senegal)

14 October 2024 2025 AFCON qualifier	Kenya	0–1	Cameroon	Kampala, Uganda
16:00 UTC+3		Report	Enow 63'	Stadium: Mandela National Stadium; Referee: Louis Houngnandande (Benin)

13 November 2024 2025 AFCON qualifier	Namibia	0–0	Cameroon	Johannesburg, South Africa
14:00		Report		Stadium: Orlando Stadium

19 November 2024 2025 AFCON qualifier	Cameroon	2–1	Zimbabwe	Yaoundé, Cameroon
14:00 UTC+1	Aboubakar 18'; Nkoudou 23'	Report	Dzvukamanja 73'	Stadium: Ahmadou Ahidjo Stadium; Referee: Pacifique Ndabihawenimana (Burundi)

=== 2025 ===
17 March 2026 World Cup qualification	Eswatini	0–0	Cameroon	Mbombela, South Africa
18:00 UTC+2		Report		Stadium: Mbombela Stadium; Attendance: 708; Referee: Lucky Kasalirwe (Uganda)

25 March 2026 World Cup qualification	Cameroon	3–1	Libya	Yaoundé, Cameroon
20:00 UTC+1	Aboubakar 26'; Mbeumo 53'; Aboubakar 61' (pen.)	Report	El Maremi 91'	Stadium: Ahmadou Ahidjo Stadium; Referee: Tom Abongile South Africa

6 June Friendly	Uganda	0–3	Cameroon	Marrakesh, Morocco
20:00			Boyomo 34'; Batoum 48'; Soko 70'	Stadium: Marrakesh Stadium

9 June Friendly	Equatorial Guinea	1–1	Cameroon	Marrakesh, Morocco
20:00	Nsue 39'		Aboubakar 28'	Stadium: Marrakesh Stadium; Referee: Karim Sabry (Morocco)

4 September 2026 World Cup qualification	Cameroon	3–0	Eswatini	Yaoundé, Cameroon
20:00 UTC+1	Gamedze 6' (o.g.); Nkoudou 25'; Avom 28'	Report		Stadium: Ahmadou Ahidjo Stadium; Attendance: 25,000; Referee: Dahane Beida (Mauritania)

9 September 2026 World Cup qualification	Cape Verde	1–0	Cameroon	Praia, Cape Verde
				Stadium: Estádio Nacional de Cabo Verde

8 October 2026 World Cup qualification	Mauritius	0–2	Cameroon	Saint Pierre, Mauritius
17:00 UTC+4		Report	Ngamaleu 57'; Mbeumo 90+2'	Stadium: Côte d'Or National Sports Complex; Referee: Tewodros Mitiku (Ethiopia)

13 October 2026 World Cup qualification	Cameroon	0–0	Angola	Yaoundé, Cameroon
17:00 UTC+1		Report		Stadium: Ahmadou Ahidjo Stadium; Attendance: 20,000; Referee: Djindo Louis Houngnandande (Benin)

13 November 2026 World Cup qualification	Cameroon	0–1	DR Congo	Rabat, Morocco
20:00 UTC+1		Report	Mbemba 90+1'	Stadium: Al Barid Stadium; Referee: Mahmood Ismail (Sudan)

24 December 2025 AFCON RR	Cameroon	1–0	Gabon	Agadir, Morocco
21:00 UTC+1	Etta Eyong 6'	Report		Stadium: Adrar Stadium; Referee: Amin Mohamed Omar (Egypt)

28 December 2025 AFCON GS	Ivory Coast	1–1	Cameroon	Marrakesh, Morocco
21:00 UTC+1	Amad 51'	Report	Konan 56' (o.g.)	Stadium: Marrakesh Stadium; Attendance: 35,165; Referee: Mustapha Ghorbal (Algeria)

31 December 2025 AFCON GS	Mozambique	1–2	Cameroon	Agadir, Morocco
20:00 UTC+1	Catamo 23'	Report	Nené 28' (o.g.); Kofane 55'	Stadium: Adrar Stadium; Attendance: 13,093; Referee: Jalal Jayed (Morocco)

=== 2026 ===
4 January 2025 AFCON Round of 16	South Africa	1–2	Cameroon	Rabat, Morocco
20:00 UTC+1	Makgopa 88'	Report	Tchamadeu 34'; Kofane 47'	Stadium: Al Medina Stadium; Attendance: 14,127; Referee: Peter Waweru (Kenya)

9 January 2025 AFCON QF	Cameroon	0–2	Morocco	Rabat, Morocco
20:00 UTC+1		Report	Brahim 26'; Saibari 74'	Stadium: Prince Moulay Abdellah Stadium; Attendance: 64,178; Referee: Dahane Beida (Mauritania)

27 March 2026 FIFA Series	Australia	1–0	Cameroon	Sydney, Australia
20:10 UTC+11	Bos 85'	Report		Stadium: Accor Stadium; Attendance: 23,798; Referee: Robert Jones (England)

31 March 2026 FIFA Series	Cameroon	2–0	China	Melbourne, Australia
17:00 UTC+11	Etta Eyong 3'; Alioum 9'; Keller (yellow card) 70' (yellow-red card) 90+1'	Report		Stadium: AAMI Park; Referee: Alireza Faghani (Australia)

TBD 2027 AFCON qualification	Cameroon	v	Comoros	TBD, Cameroon
TBD				Stadium: TBD

TBD 2027 AFCON qualification	Comoros	v	Cameroon	TBD, Comoros
TBD				Stadium: TBD

TBD 2027 AFCON qualification	Cameroon	v	Namibia	TBD, Cameroon
TBD				Stadium: TBD

TBD 2027 AFCON qualification	Namibia	v	Cameroon	TBD, Namibia
TBD				Stadium: TBD

TBD 2027 AFCON qualification	Cameroon	v	Congo	TBD, Cameroon
TBD				Stadium: TBD

TBD 2027 AFCON qualification	Congo	v	Cameroon	TBD, Congo
TBD				Stadium: TBD
