= 2020 African Nations Championship =

6th edition of CHAN

Championnat d'Afrique des Nations 2020 2020 CHAN / CHAN 2020

Tournament details
- Host country: Cameroon
- Dates: 16 January – 7 February 2021
- Teams: 16 (from 1 confederation)
- Venues: 4 (in 3 host cities)

Final positions
- Champions: Morocco (2nd title)
- Runners-up: Mali
- Third place: Guinea
- Fourth place: Cameroon

Tournament statistics
- Matches played: 32
- Goals scored: 62 (1.94 per match)
- Top scorer: (Morocco) Soufiane Rahimi (5 goals)
- Best player: (Morocco) Soufiane Rahimi
- Best young player: (Guinea) Morlaye Sylla
- Best goalkeeper: (Morocco) Anas Zniti
- Fair play award: Mali

The 2020 African Nations Championship, known as CHAN 2020 for short and the Total African Nations Championship for sponsorship purposes, was the 6th edition of the biennial association football tournament organized by the Confederation of African Football (CAF), featuring national teams consisting of players from their respective national leagues. It was held in Cameroon from 16 January to 7 February 2021.

Originally scheduled from 4 to 25 April 2020, CAF announced its postponement on 17 March 2020 to a later date due to the COVID-19 pandemic in Africa, eventually rescheduling it to January 2021 on 30 June that year.

Morocco defeated Mali in the final to successfully defend their title, thus joining DR Congo as the tournament's most successful nations as well as being the first team to win it back-to-back or twice in a row.

== Host selection ==
Ethiopia were originally officially appointed to host the tournament on 4 February 2018 after the final of the previous edition in Morocco, but the country's football federation admitted it wasn't ready so it was handed over to Cameroon instead. Originally scheduled for January and February 2020, it was postponed to April 2020 and then to January and February 2021.

After inspecting all stadia and infrastructure, CAF delivered a satisfactory certificate to Cameroon in which they indicated the percentage of attendance in line with health exigencies outlined by FIFA. Twenty five percent of spectators were admitted in the different stadia during the group stage of the competition and about 50% spectator increament the knock-out phases.

== Qualification ==
The qualification rounds took place in 2019. Djibouti and Gabon were banned as they withdrew during the qualification for the previous edition. The former, along with original hosts Ethiopia were later reinstated.

=== Qualified teams ===
The following 16 teams qualified for the final tournament:

Tunisia withdrew from the tournament despite qualification. CAF invited Libya, whom Tunisia defeated to qualify, and gave them a deadline of 28 January 2020 to decide whether or not to participate in place of Tunisia. Libya accepted the invitation and Tunisia were fined $75,000 and banned from participating in the qualification rounds of the next edition.

Team	Zone	Appearance	Previous best performance	FIFA ranking at start of event
Cameroon (hosts)	Central Zone	4th	Quarter-finals (2011, 2016)	50
Congo	Central Zone	3rd	Quarter-finals (2018)	91
DR Congo	Central Zone	5th	Champions (2009, 2016)	60
Rwanda	Central Eastern Zone	4th	Quarter-finals (2016)	133
Tanzania	Central Eastern Zone	2nd	Group stage (2009)	135
Uganda	Central Eastern Zone	5th	Group stage (2011, 2014, 2016, 2018)	79
Libya	Northern Zone	4th	Champions (2014)	111
Morocco	Northern Zone	4th	Champions (2018)	35
Namibia	Southern Zone	2nd	Quarter-finals (2018)	119
Zambia	Southern Zone	4th	Third place (2009)	90
Zimbabwe	Southern Zone	5th	Fourth place (2014)	108
Guinea	Western Zone A	3rd	Fourth place (2016)	73
Mali	Western Zone A	4th	Runners-up (2016)	57
Burkina Faso	Western Zone B	3rd	Group stage (2014, 2018)	58
Niger	Western Zone B	3rd	Quarter-finals (2011)	113
Togo	Western Zone B	1st	Debut	128

== Venues ==
Matches were held in four venues across three cities: Yaoundé, Limbé and Douala. The fixtures were announced on 24 February 2020.

2020 African Nations Championship is located in Cameroon	Douala	
2020 African Nations Championship is located in Cameroon	Japoma Stadium	Reunification Stadium
2020 African Nations Championship is located in Cameroon	Capacity: 50,000	Capacity: 30,000
2020 African Nations Championship is located in Cameroon	Yaoundé	Limbe
2020 African Nations Championship is located in Cameroon	Ahmadou Ahidjo Stadium	Limbe Stadium
2020 African Nations Championship is located in Cameroon	Capacity: 42,500	Capacity: 20,000

== Squads ==
Each squad could contain a maximum of 23 players (Regulations Article 72).

== Match officials ==
The following 43 match officials officiated during the 2020 African Nations Championship.

Referees

- (Algeria) Lahlou Benbraham
- (Burundi) George Gatogato
- (Burundi) Pacifique Ndabihawenimana
- (Cameroon) Sidi Alioum
- (Democratic Republic of the Congo) Jean-Jacques Ndala
- (Egypt) Mahmoud El Banna (+ VAR)
- (Egypt) Mohamed Marouf
- (Ethiopia) (Ms) Lidya Tafesse
- (Ghana) Daniel Nii Laryea
- (Kenya) Peter Waweru
- (Madagascar) Andofetra Rakotojaona
- (Morocco) Adil Zourak (+ VAR)
- (Mali) Boubou Traoré
- (Mauritania) Beida Dahane (+ VAR)
- (Mauritius) Ahmad Imtehaz Heeralall
- (Morocco) Samir Guezzaz
- (Rwanda) Jean Claude Ishimwe
- (Tunisia) Sadok Selmi

Assistant referees

- (Angola) Jerson Dos Santos (+ AVAR)
- (Cameroon) Elvis Noupue (+ AVAR)
- (Cameroon) (Ms) Carine Atezambong Fomo
- (Chad) Issa Yaya
- (Djibouti) Liban Abdirazack Ahmed
- (Democratic Republic of the Congo) Oliver Safari
- (Egypt) Mahmoud Abouelregal (+ AVAR)
- (Gabon) Boris Ditsoga
- (The Gambia) Abdul Aziz Jawo
- (Kenya) Gilbert Cheruiyot
- (Libya) Attia Amsaaed
- (Madagascar) Lionel Andrianantenaina
- (Malawi) (Ms) Bernadettar Kwimbira
- (Morocco) Mostafa Akarkad
- (Morocco) Zakaria Brinsi
- (Niger) Abdoul Aziz Saley
- (Nigeria) Mimisen Iyorhe
- (Nigeria) Samuel Pwadutakam
- (Seychelles) James Emile
- (Sudan) Mohammed Abdallah Ibrahim (+ AVAR)
- (Tunisia) Kahalil Hassani (+ AVAR)
- (South Africa) Zakhele Siwela (+ AVAR)

Video assistant referees

- (Ethiopia) Bamlak Tessema Weyesa
- (The Gambia) Bakary Gassama
- (Tunisia) Haythem Guirat
- (Zambia) Janny Sikazwe

== Draw ==
The draw of this edition of the tournament was held at the Polyvalent Sports Center of Yaoundé in Yaoundé on 17 February 2020 at 19:00 WAT (UTC+1). The 16 teams were drawn into 4 groups of 4 and were allocated into 4 pots, with the hosts Cameroon seeded in position A1 of Group A1 and the defending champions Morocco seeded in position C1 of Group C.

Pot 1	Pot 2	Pot 3	Pot 4
Cameroon (hosts; position A1); Morocco (holders; position C1); Libya; Zambia	DR Congo; Guinea; Mali; Rwanda	Uganda; Congo; Namibia; Burkina Faso	Zimbabwe; Niger; Togo; Tanzania

== Group stage ==
The top two teams of each group advanced to the quarter-finals.

Tiebreakers

Teams were ranked according to points (3 points for a win, 1 point for a draw, 0 points for a loss), and if tied on points, the following tiebreaking criteria were applied, in the order given, to determine the rankings (Regulations Article 74):

1. Points in head-to-head matches among tied teams;
2. Goal difference in head-to-head matches among tied teams;
3. Goals scored in head-to-head matches among tied teams;
4. If more than two teams were tied, and after applying all head-to-head criteria above, a subset of teams were still tied, all head-to-head criteria above were reapplied exclusively to this subset of teams;
5. Goal difference in all group matches;
6. Goals scored in all group matches;
7. Drawing of lots.

All times are local, WAT (UTC+1).

=== Group A ===
Pos	Team	Pld	W	D	L	GF	GA	GD	Pts	Qualification
1	Mali	3	2	1	0	3	1	+2	7	Knockout stage
2	Cameroon (H)	3	1	2	0	2	1	+1	5	Knockout stage
3	Burkina Faso	3	1	1	1	3	2	+1	4	
4	Zimbabwe	3	0	0	3	1	5	−4	0	

Source: CAF
Rules for classification: Tiebreakers
(H) Hosts
16 January 2021
17:00

Cameroon	1–0	Zimbabwe
Banga 72'	Report

Ahmadou Ahidjo Stadium, Yaoundé
Referee: Jean-Jacques Ndala (DR Congo)
16 January 2021
20:00

Mali	1–0	Burkina Faso
Bagayoko 70'	Report

Ahmadou Ahidjo Stadium, Yaoundé
Referee: Mohamed Marouf (Egypt)

20 January 2021
17:00

Cameroon	1–1	Mali
Banga 6'	Report	Samaké 12'

Ahmadou Ahidjo Stadium, Yaoundé
Referee: Pacifique Ndabihawenimana (Burundi)
20 January 2021
20:00

Burkina Faso	3–1	Zimbabwe
Sosso 14'; Kiendrébéogo 53'; Ouedraogo 67'	Report	Jaure 23'

Ahmadou Ahidjo Stadium, Yaoundé
Referee: Mahmoud El Banna (Egypt)

24 January 2021
20:00

Burkina Faso	0–0	Cameroon
	Report

Ahmadou Ahidjo Stadium, Yaoundé
Referee: Sadok Selmi (Tunisia)
24 January 2021
20:00

Zimbabwe	0–1	Mali
	Report	Diallo 11'

Japoma Stadium, Douala
Referee: Beida Dahane (Mauritania)

=== Group B ===
Pos	Team	Pld	W	D	L	GF	GA	GD	Pts	Qualification
1	DR Congo	3	2	1	0	4	2	+2	7	Knockout stage
2	Congo	3	1	1	1	2	2	0	4	Knockout stage
3	Niger	3	0	2	1	2	3	−1	2	
4	Libya	3	0	2	1	1	2	−1	2	

Source: CAF
Rules for classification: Tiebreakers
17 January 2021
17:00

Libya	0–0	Niger
	Report

Japoma Stadium, Douala
Referee: Daniel Nii Laryea (Ghana)
17 January 2021
20:00

DR Congo	1–0	Congo
Kubanza 47'	Report

Japoma Stadium, Douala
Referee: Samir Guezzaz (Morocco)

21 January 2021
17:00

Libya	1–1	DR Congo
Al-Mehdi 6'	Report	Obenza 90+4'

Japoma Stadium, Douala
Referee: Boubou Traore (Mali)
21 January 2021
20:00

Congo	1–1	Niger
Mouandza 35'	Report	Moussa 70' (pen.)

Japoma Stadium, Douala
Referee: Peter Waweru (Kenya)

25 January 2021
20:00

Congo	1–0	Libya
Ngouonimba 50'	Report

Japoma Stadium, Douala
Referee: Sidi Alioum (Cameroon)
25 January 2021
20:00

Niger	1–2	DR Congo
Moussa 73'	Report	Kabangu 27'; Obenza 90+1'

Ahmadou Ahidjo Stadium, Yaoundé
Referee: Lahlou Benbraham (Algeria)

=== Group C ===
Pos	Team	Pld	W	D	L	GF	GA	GD	Pts	Qualification
1	Morocco	3	2	1	0	6	2	+4	7	Knockout stage
2	Rwanda	3	1	2	0	3	2	+1	5	Knockout stage
3	Togo	3	1	0	2	4	5	−1	3	
4	Uganda	3	0	1	2	3	7	−4	1	

Source: CAF
Rules for classification: Tiebreakers
18 January 2021
17:00

Morocco	1–0	Togo
Jabrane 27' (pen.)	Report

Stade de la Réunification, Douala
Referee: Andofetra Rakotojaona (Madagascar)
18 January 2021
20:00

Rwanda	0–0	Uganda
	Report

Stade de la Réunification, Douala
Referee: Beida Dahane (Mauritania)

22 January 2021
17:00

Morocco	0–0	Rwanda
	Report

Stade de la Réunification, Douala
Referee: Ahmad Heeralall (Mauritius)
22 January 2021
20:00

Uganda	1–2	Togo
Kyeyune 51'	Report	Mbowa 48' (o.g.); Nane 57'

Stade de la Réunification, Douala
Referee: Georges Gatogato (Burundi)

26 January 2021
20:00

Uganda	2–5	Morocco
Orit 25'; Kyeyune 84'	Report	El Kaabi 45+4' (pen.); Rahimi 51', 80'; El Moussaoui 71'; Lukwago 90+2' (o.g.)

Stade de la Réunification, Douala
Referee: Boubou Traore (Mali)
26 January 2021
20:00

Togo	2–3	Rwanda
Nane 38'; Akoro 58'	Report	Niyonzima 45+1'; Tuyisenge 60'; Sugira 66'

Limbe Stadium, Limbé
Referee: Mohamed Maarouf Eid Mansour (Egypt)

=== Group D ===
Pos	Team	Pld	W	D	L	GF	GA	GD	Pts	Qualification
1	Guinea	3	1	2	0	6	3	+3	5	Knockout stage
2	Zambia	3	1	2	0	3	1	+2	5	Knockout stage
3	Tanzania	3	1	1	1	3	4	−1	4	
4	Namibia	3	0	1	2	0	4	−4	1	

Source: CAF
Rules for classification: Tiebreakers
19 January 2021
17:00

Zambia	2–0	Tanzania
Sikombe 64' (pen.); Chabula 81'	Report

Limbe Stadium, Limbé
Referee: Lahlou Benbraham (Algeria)
19 January 2021
20:00

Guinea	3–0	Namibia
Barry 13', 86'; Sylla 45+2'	Report

Limbe Stadium, Limbé
Referee: Jean Claude Ishimwe (Rwanda)

23 January 2021
17:00

Zambia	1–1	Guinea
Sautu 87'	Report	Kantabadouno 58'

Limbe Stadium, Limbé
Referee: Adil Zourak (Morocco)
23 January 2021
20:00

Namibia	0–1	Tanzania
	Report	Mussa 65'

Limbe Stadium, Limbé
Referee: Lidya Tafesse (Ethiopia)

27 January 2021
20:00

Namibia	0–0	Zambia
	Report

Limbe Stadium, Limbé
Referee: Andofetra Rakotojaona (Madagascar)
27 January 2021
20:00

Tanzania	2–2	Guinea
Majogoro 23'; Manyama 69'	Report	Barry 4' (pen.); Kantabadouno 82'

Stade de la Réunification, Douala
Referee: Georges Gatogato (Burundi)

== Knockout stage ==
In the knockout stage, extra time and a penalty shoot-out were used to decide the winner if necessary, except for the third place match where a penalty shoot-out (no extra time) would be used to decide the winner if necessary (Regulations Article 75).

=== Bracket ===
Quarter-finals
30 January – Yaoundé
Mali (p)	0 (5)
Congo	0 (4)
31 January – Limbé
Guinea	1
Rwanda	0
31 January – Douala (Réunification)
Morocco	3
Zambia	1
30 January – Douala (Japoma)
DR Congo	1
Cameroon	2

Semi-finals
3 February – Douala (Japoma)
Mali (p)	0 (5)
Guinea	0 (4)
3 February – Limbé
Morocco	4
Cameroon	0

Final
7 February – Yaoundé
Mali	0
Morocco	2
Third place match
6 February – Douala (Réunification)
Guinea	2
Cameroon	0

=== Quarter-finals ===
30 January 2021
17:00

Mali	0–0 (a.e.t.)	Congo
	Report
Penalties
Samake (penalty scored); Kyabou (penalty scored); Samabali (penalty scored); Doumba (penalty scored); Coulibaly (penalty scored)	5–4	(penalty missed) Mapata; (penalty scored) Ondongo; (penalty scored) Binguila; (penalty scored) Mokombo; (penalty scored) Ndzila

Ahmadou Ahidjo Stadium, Yaoundé
Referee: Peter Waweru (Kenya)

30 January 2021
20:00

DR Congo	1–2	Cameroon
Lilepo 22'	Report	N'Djeng 29'; Oukiné 42'

Japoma Stadium, Douala
Referee: Mohamed Maarouf Eid Mansour (Egypt)

31 January 2021
17:00

Morocco	3–1	Zambia
Rahimi 1'; Ali Bemammer 8'; El Kaabi 39' (pen.)	Report	Phiri 80'

Stade de la Réunification, Douala
Referee: Pacifique Ndabihawenimana (Burundi)

31 January 2021
20:00

Guinea	1–0	Rwanda
Sylla 60'	Report

Limbe Stadium, Limbé
Referee: Samir Guezzaz (Morocco)

=== Semi-finals ===
3 February 2021
16:00

Mali	0–0 (a.e.t.)	Guinea
	Report
Penalties
Samake (penalty scored); Kyabou (penalty scored); Samabali (penalty scored); Kanoute (penalty scored); Coulibaly (penalty scored)	5–4	(penalty scored) Barry; (penalty scored) Camara; (penalty scored) Camara; (penalty scored) Bangoura; (penalty missed) Sylla

Japoma Stadium, Douala
Referee: Mahmoud El Banna (Egypt)

3 February 2021
20:00

Morocco	4–0	Cameroon
Bouftini 29'; Rahimi 40', 74'; Ali Bemammer 82'	Report

Limbe Stadium, Limbé
Referee: Jean Ngambo (DR Congo)

=== Third place match ===
6 February 2021
20:00

Guinea	2–0	Cameroon
Sylla 9'; Bangoura 45+1'	Report

Stade de la Réunification, Douala
Referee: Lahlou Benbraham (Algeria)

=== Final ===
7 February 2021
20:00

Mali	0–2	Morocco
	Report	Bouftini 68'; El Kaabi 79'

Ahmadou Ahidjo Stadium, Yaoundé
Referee: Peter Waweru (Kenya)

== Goalscorers ==
There were 62 goals scored in 32 matches, for an average of 1.94 goals per match.

5 goals

- (Morocco) Soufiane Rahimi

3 goals

- (Morocco) Ayoub El Kaabi
- (Guinea) Yakhouba Gnagna Barry
- (Guinea) Morlaye Sylla

2 goals

- (Morocco) Soufiane Bouftini
- (Morocco) Mohammed Ali Bemammer
- (Cameroon) Salomon Charles Banga
- (Democratic Republic of the Congo) Masasi Obenza
- (Guinea) Victor Kantabadouno
- (Niger) Mossi Issa Moussa
- (Togo) Richard Nane
- (Uganda) Saidi Kyeyune

1 goal

- (Morocco) Hamza El Moussaoui
- (Morocco) Yahya Jabrane
- (Burkina Faso) Claver Kiendrébéogo
- (Burkina Faso) Issiaka Ouedraogo
- (Burkina Faso) Issouf Sosso
- (Cameroon) Yannick N'Djeng
- (Cameroon) Félix Oukiné
- (Republic of the Congo) Mapata Mouandza
- (Republic of the Congo) Gautrand Ngouonimba
- (Democratic Republic of the Congo) Kadima Kabangu
- (Democratic Republic of the Congo) Chico Kubanza
- (Democratic Republic of the Congo) Makabi Lilepo
- (Guinea) Mamadouba Bangoura
- (Libya) Moataz Al-Mehdi
- (Mali) Siaka Bagayoko
- (Mali) Demba Diallo
- (Mali) Issaka Samaké
- (Rwanda) Olivier Niyonzima
- (Rwanda) Ernest Sugira
- (Rwanda) Jacques Tuyisenge
- (Tanzania) Baraka Majogoro
- (Tanzania) Edward Charles Manyama
- (Tanzania) Faridi Mussa
- (Togo) Bilali Akoro
- (Uganda) Ibrahim Orit
- (Zambia) Emmanuel Chabula
- (Zambia) Moses Phiri
- (Zambia) Spencer Sautu
- (Zambia) Collins Sikombe
- (Zimbabwe) Partson Jaure

1 own goal

- (Uganda) Charles Lukwago (against Morocco)
- (Uganda) Paul Mbowa (against Togo)

== Awards ==
The following awards were given at the conclusion of the tournament:

Total Man of the Competition
(Morocco) Soufiane Rahimi
Top Scorer
(Morocco) Soufiane Rahimi
(5 goals)
Best Goalkeeper
(Morocco) Anas Zniti
Best Young Player
(Guinea) Morlaye Sylla
Best Coach
Hussein Ammouta (Morocco)
CAF Fair Play Team
Mali

=== Team of the Tournament ===
Goalkeeper	Defenders	Midfielders	Forwards
(Morocco) Anas Zniti	(Mali) Issaka Samake; (Mali) Yacouba Doumbia; (Morocco) Abdelmounaim Boutouil; (Morocco) Hamza El Moussaoui	(Morocco) Yahya Jabrane; (Mali) Sadio Kanoute; (Guinea) Morlaye Sylla	(Guinea) Yakhouba Gnagna Barry; (Morocco) Ayoub El Kaabi; (Morocco) Soufiane Rahimi

=== Man of the match ===
Stage	Team 1	Result	Team 2	Man of the Match
Group stage matches
Group A	Cameroon	1–0	Zimbabwe	(Cameroon) Ako Assomo
Group A	Mali	1–0	Burkina Faso	(Mali) Ibourahima Sidibe
Group B	Libya	0–0	Niger	(Niger) Abdoul Moumouni
Group B	DR Congo	1–0	Congo	(Democratic Republic of the Congo) Henock Inonga Baka
Group C	Morocco	1–0	Togo	(Morocco) Soufiane Rahimi
Group C	Rwanda	0–0	Uganda	(Rwanda) Fitina Omborenga
Group D	Zambia	2–0	Tanzania	(Zambia) Collins Sikombe
Group D	Guinea	3–0	Namibia	(Guinea) Morlaye Sylla
Group A	Cameroon	1–1	Mali	(Mali) Moussa Kyabou
Group A	Burkina Faso	3–1	Zimbabwe	(Burkina Faso) Ismahila Ouédraogo
Group B	Libya	1–1	DR Congo	(Libya) Abdullah Abdulrahman
Group B	Congo	1–1	Niger	(Republic of the Congo) Mick Itali Ossete
Group C	Morocco	0–0	Rwanda	(Morocco) Abdelkrim Baadi
Group C	Uganda	1–2	Togo	(Togo) Ismaïl Ouro-Agoro
Group D	Zambia	1–1	Guinea	(Guinea) Morlaye Sylla
Group D	Namibia	0–1	Tanzania	(Tanzania) Faridi Mussa
Group A	Burkina Faso	0–0	Cameroon	(Burkina Faso) Hamed Belem
Group A	Zimbabwe	0–1	Mali	(Mali) Mussa Ballo
Group B	Congo	1–0	Libya	(Republic of the Congo) Hardy Binguila
Group B	Niger	1–2	DR Congo	(Niger) Ibrahim Issa
Group C	Uganda	2–5	Morocco	(Morocco) Soufiane Rahimi
Group C	Togo	2–3	Rwanda	(Rwanda) Jacques Tuyisenge
Group D	Namibia	0–0	Zambia	(Zambia) Collins Sikombe
Group D	Tanzania	2–2	Guinea	(Guinea) Victor Kantabadouno
Knockout stage matches
Quarter-finals	Mali	0–0 (a.e.t.) (5–4 p)	Congo	(Mali) Sadio Kanoute
Quarter-finals	DR Congo	1–2	Cameroon	(Cameroon) Ako Assomo
Quarter-finals	Morocco	3–1	Zambia	(Morocco) Mohammed Ali Bemammer
Quarter-finals	Guinea	1–0	Rwanda	(Guinea) Morlaye Sylla
Semi-finals	Mali	0–0 (a.e.t.) (5–4 p)	Guinea	(Mali) Sadio Kanoute
Semi-finals	Morocco	4–0	Cameroon	(Morocco) Soufiane Rahimi
Third place match	Guinea	2–0	Cameroon	(Guinea) Morlaye Sylla
Final	Mali	0–2	Morocco	(Morocco) Anas Zniti

=== Tournament team rankings ===
As per statistical convention in football, matches decided in extra time are counted as wins and losses, while matches decided by penalty shoot-outs are counted as draws.

Pos	Team	Pld	W	D	L	GF	GA	GD	Pts	Final result
1	Morocco	6	5	1	0	15	3	+12	16	Champions
2	Mali	6	2	3	1	3	3	0	9	Runners-up
3	Guinea	6	3	3	0	9	3	+6	12	Third place
4	Cameroon (H)	6	2	2	2	4	8	−4	8	Fourth place
5	DR Congo	4	2	1	1	5	4	+1	7	Eliminated in quarter-finals
6	Zambia	4	1	2	1	4	4	0	5	Eliminated in quarter-finals
7	Rwanda	4	1	2	1	3	3	0	5	Eliminated in quarter-finals
8	Congo	4	1	2	1	2	2	0	5	Eliminated in quarter-finals
9	Burkina Faso	3	1	1	1	3	2	+1	4	Eliminated in group stage
10	Tanzania	3	1	1	1	3	4	−1	4	Eliminated in group stage
11	Togo	3	1	0	2	4	5	−1	3	Eliminated in group stage
12	Niger	3	0	2	1	2	3	−1	2	Eliminated in group stage
13	Libya	3	0	2	1	1	2	−1	2	Eliminated in group stage
14	Uganda	3	0	1	2	3	7	−4	1	Eliminated in group stage
15	Namibia	3	0	1	2	0	4	−4	1	Eliminated in group stage
16	Zimbabwe	3	0	0	3	1	5	−4	0	Eliminated in group stage

Source: CAF
(H) Hosts
