= Isaka (disambiguation) =

Isaka is a town in Tanzania. Isaka may also refer to:

- Isaka (name)
- Isaka Dam in Japan
- Isaka-Ivondro, a town and commune in Madagascar
- Isaka river - a river in Vatovavy, Madagascar.

== See also ==
- Issaka
- Isakas
