= Mossi Issa Moussa =

Nigerien footballer

Personal information
- Full name: Mossi Issa Moussa
- Date of birth: 24 January 1993 (age 33)
- Place of birth: Niger
- Height: 1.82 m (6 ft 0 in)
- Position: Forward

Team information
- Current team: Douanes

Senior career*
Years	Team	Apps	(Gls)
2011–	Douanes		

International career^{‡}
2012–	Niger	14	(3)
- * Club domestic league appearances and goals ‡ National team caps and goals as of 14 October 2021

Mossi Issa Moussa (born 24 January 1993) is a Nigerien international footballer.

== International career ==
=== International goals ===
Scores and results list Niger's goal tally first.

No	Date	Venue	Opponent	Score	Result	Competition
1.	22 January 2016	Stade Régional Nyamirambo, Kigali, Rwanda	Guinea	1–0	2–2	2016 African Nations Championship
2.	21 January 2021	Japoma Stadium, Douala, Cameroon	Congo	1–1	1–1	2020 African Nations Championship
3.	25 January 2021	Stade Ahmadou Ahidjo, Yaoundé, Cameroon	DR Congo	1–1	1–1	2020 African Nations Championship
