= Issouf Sosso =

Burkinabé footballer

Personal information
- Full name: Lagnené Issouf Sosso
- Date of birth: 11 August 1996 (age 30)
- Place of birth: Ouagadougou, Burkina Faso
- Position: Defender

Team information
- Current team: ASFA Yennenga

Senior career*
Years	Team	Apps	(Gls)
2015–2018	US Ouagadougou		
2018–2020	Salitas		
2020–	ASFA Yennenga		

International career^{‡}
2019–	Burkina Faso	6	(1)
- * Club domestic league appearances and goals as of 16:01, 6 June 2021 (UTC) ‡ National team caps and goals as of 16:01, 11 August 2026 (UTC)

Issouf Sosso (born 11 August 1996) is a Burkinabé football defender who plays for ASFA Yennenga. He was a squad member for the 2020 African Nations Championship.

== Career statistics ==
=== International ===
As of match played 9 January 2025

Appearances and goals by national team and year
National team	Year	Apps	Goals
Burkina Faso	2019	1	0
Burkina Faso	2020	–	
Burkina Faso	2021	2	1
Burkina Faso	2022	–	
Burkina Faso	2023	–	
Burkina Faso	2024	1	0
Burkina Faso	2025	2	0
Total		6	1

Scores and results list Burkina Faso's goal tally first, score column indicates score after each Sosso goal.

List of international goals scored by Issouf Sosso
No.	Date	Venue	Opponent	Score	Result	Competition
1	20 January 2021	Stade Ahmadou Ahidjo, Yaoundé, Cameroon	Zimbabwe	1–0	3–1	2020 African Nations Championship
