= Félix Oukiné =

Cameroonian footballer

Personal information
- Full name: Félix Oukiné Tcheoude
- Date of birth: 26 December 1999 (age 26)
- Place of birth: Cameroon
- Height: 1.78 m (5 ft 10 in)
- Position: Midfielder

Senior career*
Years	Team	Apps	(Gls)
2018–2023	Coton Sport		
2023	RAAL La Louvière	4	(0)
2023–2024	Al-Khor	8	(0)

International career^{‡}
2021–	Cameroon	6	(1)
- * Club domestic league appearances and goals ‡ National team caps and goals as of 01:44, 30 March 2021 (UTC)

Félix Oukiné Tcheoude (born 26 December 1999) is a Cameroonian professional footballer who is a free agent midfielder.

== Club career ==
=== Coton Sport ===
While serving as team captain in 2020–21, Oukiné led Coton Sport to the group stage of the CAF Confederation Cup for the first time in seven years. He scored one goal in the competition, contributing the deciding goal in the away leg of their 2–0 first round win over Zambian champions Green Eagles on 23 December 2020.

=== RAAL La Louvière ===
On 1 January 2023, RAAL La Louvière confirmed the signing of Oukiné.

== International career ==
Oukiné was called up to the Cameroon national team by manager Martin Ndtoungou in January 2021 as a part of his 33-man squad for the pandemic-delayed 2020 African Nations Championship on home soil. He made his debut in the opening match against Zimbabwe on 16 January, playing the full 90 minutes of their 1–0 win. After appearing in all three group matches, he scored his maiden international goal in their quarterfinal matchup against DR Congo, securing the 2–1 comeback victory and a spot in the next round. Cameroon was eliminated by eventual champions Morocco in the semi-finals before losing to Guinea in the third-place playoff. Oukiné's performance in the tournament drew the interest of several French teams.

== Career statistics ==
=== International ===
As of 24 March 2020.

National team	Year	Apps	Goals
Cameroon	2021	6	1
Total		6	1

=== International goals ===
Scores and results list Rwanda's goal tally first.

Goal	Date	Venue	Opponent	Score	Result	Competition
1.	30 January 2021	Japoma Stadium, Douala, Cameroon	DR Congo	2–1	2–1	2020 African Nations Championship
