= Souna =

Souna is an African surname. Notable people with the surname include:

- Djibril Moussa Souna (born 1992), Nigerien football defender
- Issaka Souna (born 1954), Nigerien politician
