= Issaka =

Issaka is an African given name that may refer to

Given name

- Issaka Hassane (born 1959), track and field sprinter who competed for Chad
- Issaka Samaké, Malian football defender
- Issaka Sidibé (born 1946), Malian politician
- Issaka Souna (born 1954), Nigerien politician

Surname

- Aichatou Ousmane Issaka, social worker in Niger
- Awudu Issaka (born 1979), Ghanaian footballer
- Hamadou Djibo Issaka (born 1977), Nigerien athlete

== See also ==
- Isaka
- Isakas
