= Richard Nane =

Togolese footballer

Personal information
- Full name: Yendoutié Richard Nane
- Date of birth: 23 June 1995 (age 31)
- Place of birth: Sokodé, Togo
- Height: 1.74 m (5 ft 9 in)
- Position: Forward

Team information
- Current team: ASC Kara

Senior career*
| Years | Team | Apps | (Gls) |
| 2016–2021 | ASC Kara | | |
| 2021–2024 | Hafia FC | | (9) |
| 2024- | ASC Kara | | |

International career^{‡}
| 2019– | Togo | 16 | (4) |
- * Club domestic league appearances and goals as of 19:07, 16 April 2026 (UTC) ‡ National team caps and goals as of 19:07, 16 April 2026 (UTC)

Yendoutié Richard Nane (born 23 May 1995) is a Togolese footballer who plays as a forward for ASC Kara and the Togo national team.

== Club career ==
Nane began his career with the Togolese club ASC Kara, before transferring to Guinea with Hafia FC on 5 August 2021. He has since moved back to ASC Kara.

== International career ==
Nane made his debut with the Togo national team in a 0–0 2020 African Nations Championship qualification tie with Benin on 28 July 2019.

== International goals ==
Scores and results list Togo's goal tally first.

| No. | Date | Venue | Opponent | Score | Result | Competition |
|---|---|---|---|---|---|---|
| 1. | 22 September 2019 | Stade de Kégué, Lomé, Togo | Nigeria | 1–1 | 4–1 | 2020 African Nations Championship qualification |
| 2. | 22 September 2019 | Stade de Kégué, Lomé, Togo | Nigeria | 2–1 | 4–1 | 2020 African Nations Championship qualification |
| 3. | 22 January 2021 | Stade de la Réunification, Douala, Cameroon | Uganda | 2–1 | 2–1 | 2020 African Nations Championship |
| 4. | 26 January 2021 | Limbe Stadium, Limbe, Cameroon | Rwanda | 1–0 | 2–3 | 2020 African Nations Championship |
