= Makabi Lilepo =

Congolese footballer (born 1997)

Personal information
- Full name: Glody Makabi Lilepo
- Date of birth: 27 July 1997 (age 29)
- Place of birth: Democratic Republic of the Congo, Kinshasa
- Height: 1.85 m (6 ft 1 in)
- Position: Winger

Team information
- Current team: Al Ahly SC
- Number: 10

Youth career
- –2019: Vita Club

Senior career*
Years	Team	Apps	(Gls)
2019	→ Mbabane Swallows (loan)		
2019–2020	Renaissance		
2020–2022	Vita Club		
2022–2023	Al-Hilal Club		
2023–2025	Valenciennes	36	(2)
2025–2026	Kaizer Chiefs	42	(11)
2026-	Al Ahly SC	0	(0)

International career^{‡}
2021–	DR Congo	11	(1)
- * Club domestic league appearances and goals as of 04 October 2026 ‡ National team caps and goals as of 17:15, 9 November 2024 (UTC)

Glody Makabi Lilepo, known as Lollipop (born 27 July 1997) is a Congolese professional footballer who plays for Libyan club Al Ahly SC and the Democratic Republic of the Congo national team.

== Club career ==
=== Early career ===
Lilepo came up from the youth ranks of AS Vita Club but never made it into the first team or saw any Linafoot playing time. In late 2018 he was invited to trials at Zamalek SC of the Egyptian Premier League. In January 2019, after a two-month wait for the paperwork to be finalized, he was loaned to Mbabane Swallows for the 2018–19 Eswatini Premier League season. Halfway through the 2019–20 Linafoot season, Lilepo joined FC Renaissance du Congo. He made an immediate impact scoring four goals in his first seven matches with the club. By 2021 Lilepo had returned to AS Vita and appeared for the club in the 2020–21 CAF Champions League.

=== Kaizer Chiefs ===
On 27 January 2025, Lilepo joined Kaizer Chiefs in South Africa on a two-and-a-half-year contract. On 7 February, Lilepo scored his first goal for the soweto side in his second match against Stellenbosch.

== International career ==
Lilepo made his senior international debut on 17 January 2021 in a 2020 African Nations Championship match against the Congo. Thirteen days later he scored his first senior international goal against Cameroon in a quarter-final match of the same tournament.

== Career statistics ==
=== International ===
As of match played 14 June 2023

Appearances and goals by national team and year
National team	Year	Apps	Goals
DR Congo	2021	7	1
DR Congo	2022	2	0
DR Congo	2023	2	0
Total		11	1

Scores and results list DR Congo's goal tally first, score column indicates score after each Lilepo goal.

List of international goals scored by Makabi Lilepo
No.	Date	Venue	Opponent	Score	Result	Competition
1	30 January 2021	Japoma Stadium, Douala, Cameroon	Cameroon	1–0	1–2	2020 African Nations Championship
