= Saidi Kyeyune =

Ugandan footballer (born 1993)

Personal information
- Date of birth: 1 January 1993 (age 33)
- Place of birth: Kampala, Uganda
- Height: 1.56 m (5 ft 1 1/2 in)
- Position: Midfielder

Team information
- Current team: Police FC
- Number: 16

International career^{‡}
Years	Team	Apps	(Gls)
2012–	Uganda	20	(3)
- ‡ National team caps and goals as of 15:26, 15 February 2021 (UTC)

Saidi Kyeyune (born 1 January 1993) is a Ugandan professional footballer who plays as a midfielder for Uganda Police FC and the Ugandan national team.

== International career ==
In January 2014, coach Milutin Sedrojevic, invited him to be included in the Uganda national football team for the 2014 African Nations Championship. The team placed third in the group stage of the competition after beating Burkina Faso, drawing with Zimbabwe and losing to Morocco.

== Career statistics ==
=== International goals ===
Scores and results list Uganda's goal tally first.

No.	Date	Venue	Opponent	Score	Result	Competition
1.	6 February 2013	Amahoro Stadium, Kigali, Rwanda	Rwanda	1–0	2–2	Friendly
2.	22 January 2021	Stade de la Réunification, Douala, Cameroon	Togo	1–1	1–2	2020 African Nations Championship
3.	26 January 2021	Stade de la Réunification, Douala, Cameroon	Morocco	2–4	2–5	2020 African Nations Championship
