= Demba Diallo =

Malian footballer

Personal information
- Date of birth: 13 October 2000 (age 26)
- Place of birth: Kayes, Mali
- Height: 1.60 m (5 ft 3 in)
- Position: Winger

Team information
- Current team: Al-Wehda
- Number: 11

Youth career
- 2017–2020: Stade Malien

Senior career*
Years	Team	Apps	(Gls)
2020–2021	Stade Malien		
2021–2025	Manisa	125	(8)
2025–	Al-Wehda	12	(2)

International career^{‡}
2021–	Mali	10	(1)
- * Club domestic league appearances and goals as of 25 December 2025 ‡ National team caps and goals as of 30 July 2024

Demba Diallo (born 13 October 2000) is a Malian professional footballer who plays as a Winger for Saudi club Al-Wehda and the Mali national team.

== Club career ==
On 27 August 2021, Diallo joined TFF First League team Manisa.

On 16 August 2025, Diallo joined Saudi FDL club Al-Wehda. He made his debut here on September 13, 2024, against Al-Ula.

== International career ==
Diallo made his professional debut with the Mali national team in a 1–0 2020 African Nations Championship tie with Burkina Faso on 16 January 2021.

=== International goals ===
Scores and results list Mali's goal tally first.

No.	Date	Venue	Opponent	Score	Result	Competition
1.	20 January 2021	Japoma Stadium, Douala, Cameroon	Zimbabwe	1–0	1–0	2020 African Nations Championship
