= Siaka Bagayoko =

Malian footballer

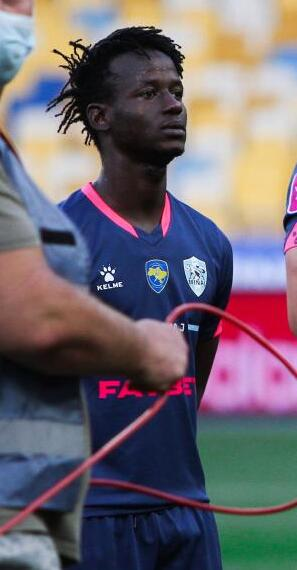

Personal information
- Full name: Siaka Bagayoko
- Date of birth: 4 July 1998 (age 28)
- Place of birth: Bamako, Mali
- Height: 1.72 m (5 ft 8 in)
- Position: Left back

Senior career*
Years	Team	Apps	(Gls)
2016	Djoliba AC	?	(?)
2016–2017	Stade Malien	?	(?)
2017	Anagennisi Karditsa	9	(0)
2018–2019	Djoliba AC	?	(?)
2019–2020	CS Sfaxien	4	(0)
2020	Djoliba AC	?	(?)
2021–2022	Mynai	15	(0)
2022–2024	Al-Ittihad	?	(?)
2024	Al-Qasim SC	?	(?)
2024–2025	AS Vita Club	?	(?)
2025	MB Rouissat	2	(0)

International career^{‡}
2015	Mali U17	9	(1)
2017	Mali U20	3	(0)
2019	Mali U23	3	(0)
2019–	Mali	11	(1)
- * Club domestic league appearances and goals as of 22 January 2026 ‡ National team caps and goals as of 15 June 2021

Siaka Bagayoko (born 4 July 1998) also known as Chato, is a Malian football defender.

== Career statistics ==
=== International ===
Appearances and goals by national team and year
National team	Year	Apps	Goals
Mali	2019	2	0
Mali	2020	–	
Mali	2021	9	1
Total		11	1

Scores and results list Mali's goal tally first, score column indicates score after each Bagayoko goal.

List of international goals scored by Siaka Bagayoko
No.	Date	Venue	Opponent	Score	Result	Competition
1	16 January 2021	Stade Ahmadou Ahidjo, Yaoundé, Cameroon	Burkina Faso	1–0	1–0	2020 African Nations Championship
