= Isaka (name) =

Isaka may refer to the following people:

Given name

- Isaka Cernak (born 1989), Australian football player

Surname

- Kōtarō Isaka (born 1971), Japanese author of mystery fiction
- Mito Isaka (born 1976), Japanese football forward
- Pixley ka Isaka Seme (c. 1881–1951), the first black lawyer in South Africa
- Tatsuya Isaka (born 1985), Japanese actor

== See also ==
- Issaka
- Isakas
