= Spencer Sautu =

Zambian footballer (born 1994)

Personal information
- Date of birth: 5 October 1994 (age 32)
- Place of birth: Maamba, Zambia
- Height: 1.60 m (5 ft 3 in)
- Position: Midfielder

Team information
- Current team: Power Dynamos

Senior career*
Years	Team	Apps	(Gls)
2014–2020	Green Eagles		
2020–	Power Dynamos		

International career^{‡}
- Zambia U17
- Zambia U20
- Zambia U23
2014–	Zambia	31	(3)
- * Club domestic league appearances and goals ‡ National team caps and goals as of 7 September 2021

Spencer Sautu (born 5 October 1994) is a Zambian professional footballer who currently plays as a midfielder for Power Dynamos.

== International career ==
=== International goals ===
Scores and results list Zambia's goal tally first.

No	Date	Venue	Opponent	Score	Result	Competition
1.	17 October 2015	Levy Mwanawasa Stadium, Ndola, Zambia	Mozambique	3–0	3–0	2016 African Nations Championship qualification
2.	21 June 2016	Sam Nujoma Stadium, Windhoek, Namibia	Lesotho	2–2	3–2	2016 COSAFA Cup
3.	23 January 2021	Limbe Stadium, Limbe, Cameroon	Guinea	1–1	1–1	2020 African Nations Championship
