= Isaka Dam =

Coordinates: 35°02′19″N 136°37′07″E

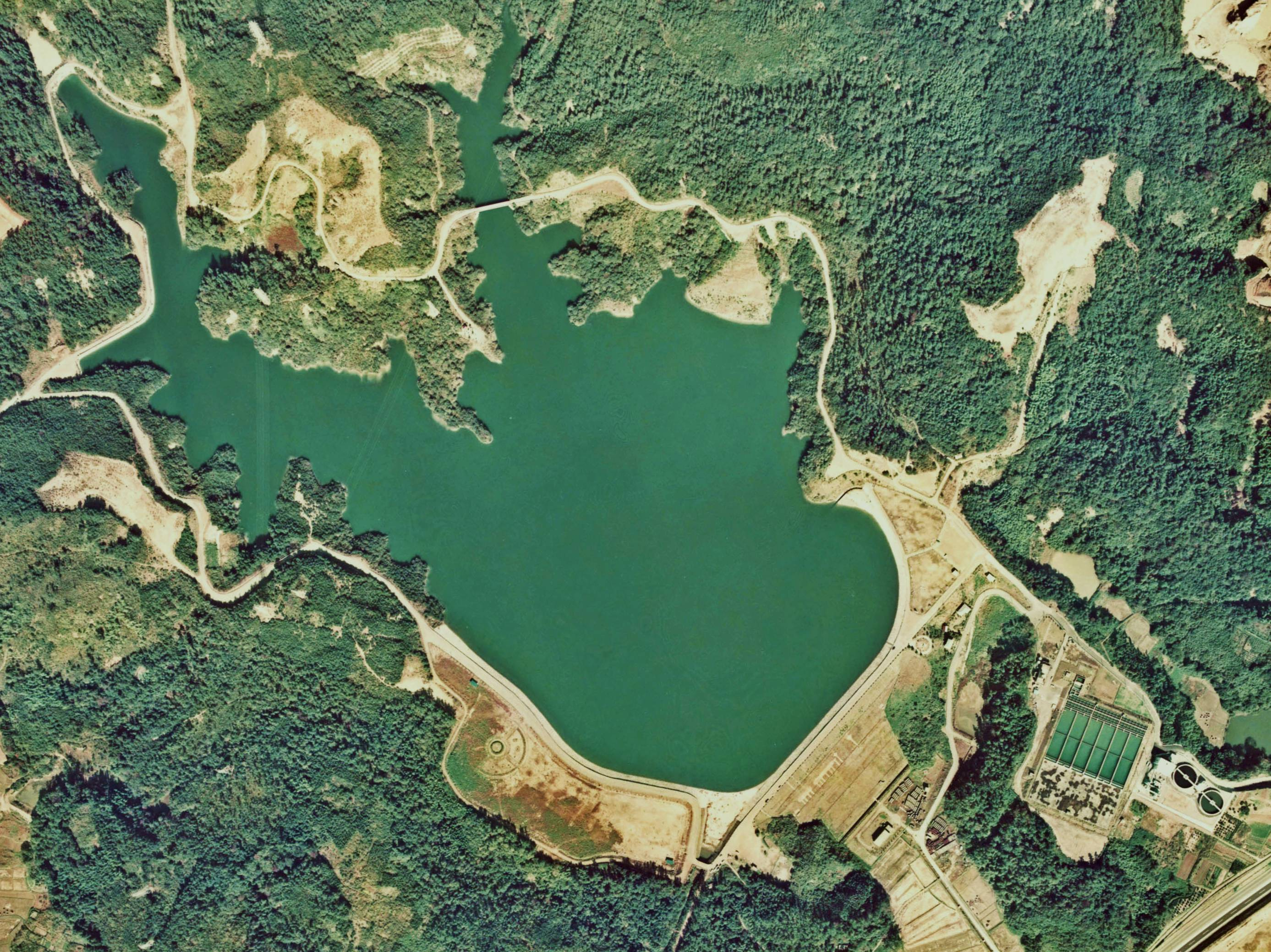
- Interactive map of Isaka Dam
- Location: Yokkaichi, Mie, Japan
- Construction began: 1963
- Opening date: 1966

Dam and spillways
- Height: 34.5 m (113 ft)
- Length: 775 m (2,543 ft)
- Dam volume: 877,000 m^{3}

Reservoir
- Total capacity: 3,780,000 m^{3}
- Catchment area: 0.8 km^{2}
- Surface area: 31 ha

Isaka Dam (伊坂ダム, Isaka damu) is a dam in Yokkaichi, Mie Prefecture, Japan, completed in 1966.
