= Charles Lukwago =

Ugandan footballer (born 1992)

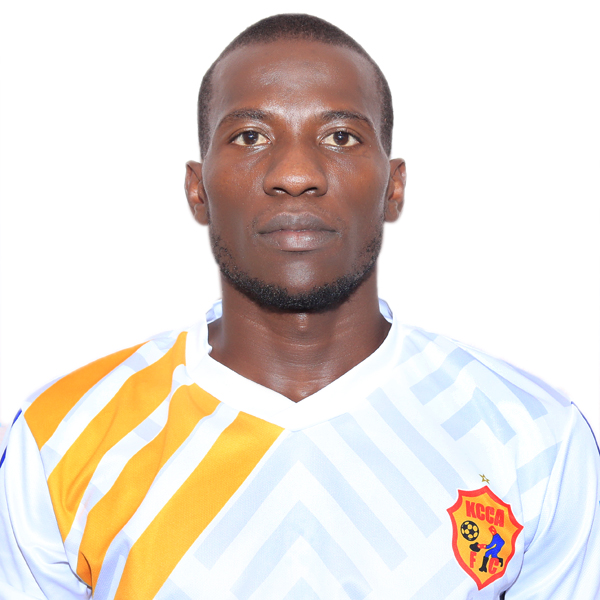

Personal information
- Date of birth: 24 November 1992 (age 33)
- Place of birth: Lugazi, Uganda
- Height: 1.81 m (5 ft 11 in)
- Position: Goalkeeper

Team information
- Current team: Hawassa City
- Number: 30

Senior career*
Years	Team	Apps	(Gls)
2011–2014	Proline		
2014–2016	Victoria University		
2015–2016	Lweza		
2016–2021	KCCA		
2021–2023	Saint George	44	(0)
2023–	Hawassa City	12	(0)

International career^{‡}
2019–	Uganda	23	(0)
- * Club domestic league appearances and goals as of 16:24, 10 June 2023 (UTC) ‡ National team caps and goals as of 16:24, 15 March 2023 (UTC)

Charles Lukwago (born 24 November 1992) is a Ugandan professional footballer who plays as a goalkeeper for Uganda Premier League club KCCA FC and the Uganda national team.

== Club career ==
In summer 2021, Lukwago signed for Ethiopian Premier League club Saint George on a two-year contract.
