= Baraka Majogoro =

Tanzanian footballer

Personal information
- Full name: Baraka Gamba Majogoro
- Date of birth: 15 May 1996 (age 30)
- Place of birth: Tarime, Tanzania
- Height: 1.67 m (5 ft 6 in)
- Position: Midfielder

Team information
- Current team: Chippa United
- Number: 19

Senior career*
Years	Team	Apps	(Gls)
2016–2017	Prisons		
2017–2019	Ndanda		
2019–2020	Polisi		
2020–2022	Mtibwa Sugar		
2022–2023	KMC		
2022–	Chippa United	19	(0)

International career^{‡}
2019–2021	Tanzania	4	(1)
- * Club domestic league appearances and goals as of 7 October 2024 ‡ National team caps and goals as of 7 October 2024

Baraka Gamba Majogoro (born 15 May 1996) is a Tanzanian footballer who plays as a midfielder for Chippa United in the South African Premier Division.

In Tanzania, Majogoro played for a string of clubs that usually finished 8th or below on the table: Prisons, Ndanda, Polisi, Mtibwa Sugar and lastly KMC.

Majogoro made his international debut for Tanzania in the 2019 CECAFA Cup. He was later called up to the 2020 African Nations Championship, held in 2021, and played three matches. He scored his first international goal against Guinea, described as a "wonder goal".

In the summer of 2023, he moved to South African Premier Division side Chippa United. He stopped at 16 games during his first season in South Africa. Nonetheless, after only a few league games in South Africa, Majogoro attracted interest from other clubs as well as South African media. The manager Morgan Mammila compared him to Andile Jali at his prime, as well as likening his playing style to Patrick Vieira. The media propagated rumours about a move to a bigger club.

In the summer of 2024, Majogoro stayed in Chippa United, who also signed another Tanzanian player Gadiel Kamagi.
