= Morlaye Sylla =

Guinean footballer

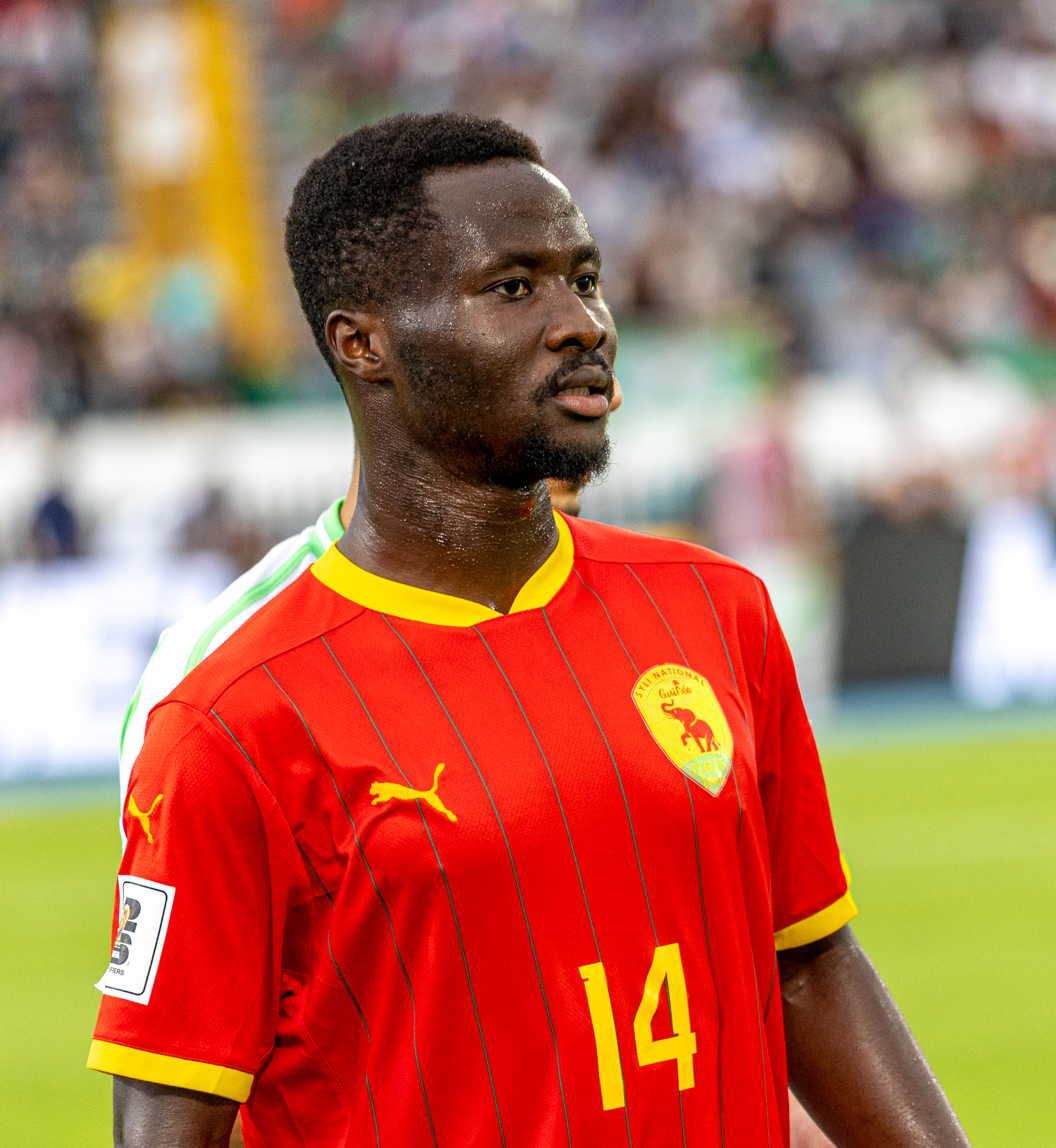
- Sylla in 2025

Personal information
- Date of birth: 27 July 1998 (age 28)
- Place of birth: Conakry, Guinea
- Height: 1.70 m (5 ft 7 in)
- Position: Midfielder

Team information
- Current team: Damac
- Number: 2

Youth career
- –2016: Espoirs Tanènè
- 2016–2017: FC Arouca

Senior career*
Years	Team	Apps	(Gls)
2017–2018	Fello Star		
2018–2019	SOAR		
2019–2022	Horoya		
2022–2025	Arouca	97	(9)
2025–	Damac Club	32	(2)

International career^{‡}
2015	Guinea U17	3	(1)
2017	Guinea U20	8	(2)
2019–	Guinea	44	(7)
- * Club domestic league appearances and goals as of 21 May 2026 ‡ National team caps and goals as of 6 June 2024

Morlaye Sylla (born 27 July 1998) is a Guinean international footballer who plays as a midfielder for Damac and the Guinea national team.

== Club career ==
On 26 August 2025, Sylla joined Saudi Pro League club Damac.

== International career ==
Sylla made his debut with the Guinea national team in a 1–0 2020 African Nations Championship qualification loss to Liberia on 21 September 2019.

== Career statistics ==
=== International ===
As of match played 4 June 2026

Appearances and goals by national team and year
National team	Year	Apps	Goals
Guinea	2019	2	0
Guinea	2020	–	
Guinea	2021	15	3
Guinea	2022	4	0
Guinea	2023	5	0
Guinea	2024	10	4
Guinea	2025	5	0
Guinea	2026	3	0
Total		44	7

Scores and results list Guinea's goal tally first, score column indicates score after each Sylla goal.

List of international goals scored by Morlaye Sylla
No.	Date	Venue	Opponent	Score	Result	Competition
1	19 January 2021	Limbe Stadium, Limbé, Cameroon	Namibia	2–0	3–0	2020 African Nations Championship
2	31 January 2021	Limbe Stadium, Limbé, Cameroon	Rwanda	1–0	1–0	2020 African Nations Championship
3	6 February 2021	Reunification Stadium, Douala, Cameroon	Cameroon	1–0	2–0	2020 African Nations Championship
4	21 March 2024	King Abdullah Sports City Stadium, Jeddah, Saudi Arabia	Vanuatu	1–0	6–0	2024 FIFA Series
5	21 March 2024	King Abdullah Sports City Stadium, Jeddah, Saudi Arabia	Vanuatu	6–0	6–0	2024 FIFA Series
6	25 March 2024	King Abdullah Sports City Stadium, Jeddah, Saudi Arabia	Bermuda	1–0	5–1	2024 FIFA Series
7	6 June 2024	Nelson Mandela Stadium, Algiers, Algeria	Algeria	1–0	2–1	2026 FIFA World Cup qualification
