= Edward Manyama =

Tanzanian footballer

Edward Charles Manyama
Personal information
- Date of birth: 2 April 1994 (age 32)
- Place of birth: Tabora, Tanzania
- Height: 1.70 m (5 ft 7 in)
- Position: Defender

Team information
- Current team: Azam

Senior career*
Years	Team	Apps	(Gls)
2013–2014	JKT Ruvu Stars		
2014–2015	Young Africans		
2015–2018	JKT Ruvu Stars		
2018–2019	Ruvu Shooting		
2019–2021	Namungo		
2021–	Azam		

International career^{‡}
2014	Tanzania	5	(1)
- * Club domestic league appearances and goals as of 1 August 2020 ‡ National team caps and goals as of 23:30, 10 September 2022 (UTC)

Edward Charles Manyama (born 2 April 1994) is a Tanzanian football defender who plays for Azam.
