= Pavelh Ndzila =

Congolese footballer (born 1995)

Personal information
- Date of birth: 12 January 1995 (age 31)
- Place of birth: Brazzaville, Congo
- Height: 1.86 m (6 ft 1 in)
- Position: Goalkeeper

Team information
- Current team: Shabana F.C.
- Number: 32

Youth career
- 2011–2013: Étoile du Congo

Senior career*
Years	Team	Apps	(Gls)
2013–2023	Étoile du Congo	146	(0)

International career
- Congo U17
- Congo U20
2014–	Congo	7	(0)
- * Club domestic league appearances and goals

Pavelh Ndzila (born 12 January 1995) is a Congolese professional footballer who plays as a goalkeeper for Shabana Fc in 2023 he was linked with Rwandan champion APR F.C..

== International career ==
At the youth level he was on the squad for the 2011 FIFA U-17 World Cup, although he didn't play. He later played in the 2015 African U-20 Championship as well as its qualifiers.

In January 2014, coach Claude Leroy invited him to be a part of the Congolese national squad for the 2014 African Nations Championship. The team was eliminated in the group stages after losing to Ghana, drawing with Libya and defeating Ethiopia.
