= Daniel Nii Laryea =

Ghanaian football referee (born 1987)

- Full name: Daniel Nii Ayi Laryea
- Born: 11 September 1987 (age 39); Ghana

Domestic
Years	League	Role
2005–	Ghana Premier League	Referee

International
Years	League	Role
2012–	CAF	Referee
2014–	FIFA	Referee

Daniel Nii Ayi Laryea (born 11 September 1987) is a Ghanaian football referee who has been on the FIFA International Referees List since 2014. He officiates in the Ghana Premier League and also serves as a FIFA Video Match Official (VMO).

Laryea began his refereeing career in Ghana's lower divisions in 2005 before making his Ghana Premier League debut in 2012. He earned his FIFA badge in 2014, after which he began officiating matches in Confederation of African Football (CAF) competitions, including the CAF Confederation Cup, CAF Champions League, African Nations Championship (CHAN), Africa Cup of Nations (AFCON), WAFU Cup of Nations and the CAF Women's Champions League.

Among his notable appointments are the 2021 Ghanaian FA Cup final, the delayed 2020 African Nations Championship, the 2021 Africa Cup of Nations, the 2022 CAF Women's Champions League final as Assistant Video Assistant Referee (AVAR), and the 2025 Africa Cup of Nations, where he officiated the semi-final between Morocco and Nigeria. In 2026, he was selected by CAF to attend the Interclub Quarter-finals Preparation Course in Cairo as both a centre referee and FIFA Video Match Official.

== Early life and education ==
Daniel Nii Ayi Laryea was born on 11 September 1987 in Accra, Ghana.

Laryea attended Accra Academy, where he developed an interest in football and eventually became the school's first-choice goalkeeper. His experiences as a player influenced his decision to pursue a career in football officiating rather than competitive playing.

He obtained a Bachelor of Science degree in Accounting from the University of Ghana Business School before earning a degree in Physical Education from the University of Education, Winneba.

== Refereeing career ==
=== Domestic career ===
Laryea began his refereeing career in October 2005 at the age of 17, officiating matches in Ghana's lower-division football leagues. He spent six years officiating in the lower divisions before earning promotion to the Ghana Premier League in 2012.

At the age of 24, Laryea made his Ghana Premier League debut in a match between Medeama SC and Berekum Chelsea. His performances in the domestic league established him as one of the Ghana Football Association's most trusted referees and led to appointments for several high-profile fixtures, including matches between Accra Hearts of Oak and Asante Kotoko, Ghana's biggest football rivalry.

In August 2021, the Ghana Football Association appointed Laryea to officiate the 2021 Ghanaian FA Cup final between Hearts of Oak and AshantiGold at the Accra Sports Stadium. The appointment came after a series of consistent performances in domestic competitions and marked one of the most significant appointments of his domestic refereeing career.

=== International career ===
==== 2014–2020 ====
Laryea was included on the FIFA International Referees List in 2014, becoming eligible to officiate international matches organised by FIFA and the Confederation of African Football (CAF). His elevation followed two years of officiating in the Ghana Premier League and marked the beginning of his international refereeing career.

His first appointment in a CAF competition came in 2014, when he officiated the CAF Confederation Cup match between Union Douala of Cameroon and ASLAD Moundou of Chad. He subsequently became a regular match official in CAF inter-club competitions, including the CAF Champions League and the CAF Confederation Cup.

Laryea's consistent performances at club level earned him appointments to several major CAF national team tournaments. He officiated at the 2017 Africa U-17 Cup of Nations in Gabon, the 2018 African Nations Championship in Morocco, the 2017 WAFU Cup of Nations in Ghana, the delayed 2020 African Nations Championship in Cameroon, and the 2021 Africa Cup of Nations in Cameroon.

With the introduction of Video Assistant Referee (VAR) technology in CAF competitions, Laryea qualified as a FIFA Video Match Official and began serving in both on-field and video officiating roles. He has since been appointed as a referee, Video Assistant Referee (VAR) and Assistant Video Assistant Referee (AVAR) in several continental competitions, including the CAF Women's Champions League and the CAF Champions League. ()

==== 2022–2024 ====
The introduction of Video Assistant Referee (VAR) technology across CAF competitions marked a new phase in Laryea's refereeing career. After completing the required FIFA and CAF VAR training programmes, he began receiving appointments as both an on-field referee and Video Match Official in continental competitions.

In October 2022, the Confederation of African Football named Laryea among the seven Video Assistant Referees selected for the 2022 CAF Women's Champions League in Morocco. He was the only Ghanaian official appointed to the VAR team for the tournament.

Laryea served as Assistant Video Assistant Referee for the tournament final between AS FAR of Morocco and Mamelodi Sundowns of South Africa, played on 13 November 2022 at the Prince Moulay Abdellah Stadium in Rabat. In December 2022, Laryea was named among the match officials for the rescheduled 2022 African Nations Championship in Algeria. On 13 January 2023, he served as the Assistant Video Assistant Referee for the tournament's opening match between hosts Algeria and Libya.

Following the tournament, Laryea continued to receive appointments as a Video Match Official in CAF competitions. In April 2023, he was appointed Video Assistant Referee (VAR) for the CAF Champions League quarter-final between Raja Casablanca and Al Ahly.

In December 2024, Laryea was selected by CAF as one of the Video Match Officials for the 2024 African Nations Championship, scheduled to be hosted by Kenya, Tanzania and Uganda. He was one of two Ghanaian match officials appointed for the tournament.

==== 2024–present ====
Laryea was subsequently named among the 23 referees selected by CAF for the 2025 Africa Cup of Nations in Morocco. During the tournament, he officiated the Group E match between Algeria and Burkina Faso before serving as Video Assistant Referee (VAR) for the quarter-final between Morocco and Cameroon. He was later appointed referee for the semi-final between hosts Morocco and Nigeria, one of the tournament's marquee fixtures.

Following the tournament, Laryea retained his place on the FIFA International Referees List for the 2026 season. In March 2026, CAF selected him to participate in its Interclub Quarter-finals Preparation Course in Cairo, Egypt, where he trained as both a FIFA referee and FIFA Video Match Official ahead of the knockout stages of the CAF Champions League and CAF Confederation Cup.

In February 2026, CAF appointed Laryea as referee for the CAF Confederation Cup fixture between Kaizer Chiefs of South Africa and Al Masry of Egypt, extending his involvement in continental inter-club competitions. In 2026, he was selected as Assistant Video Assistant Referee (AVAR) for the CAF Champions League quarter-final between AS FAR and RS Berkane after attending CAF's Interclub Quarter-finals Preparation Course in Cairo.

== Personal life ==
Outside football, Laryea is an accountant by profession. Laryea enjoys physical training and basketball in his leisure time. He also loves to model and take pictures.

Laryea has credited his early experiences as a goalkeeper at Accra Academy with influencing his decision to pursue football officiating. In interviews, he has also highlighted the importance of continuous training and professional development throughout his refereeing career.
