= Isakas =

Isakas is a Lithuanian masculine given name derived from Isaac. Notable people with the name include:

- Isakas Anolikas (1903–1943), Lithuanian cyclist
- Isakas Vistaneckis (1910–2000), Lithuanian chess master

== See also ==
- Isaka (name)
