= Issaka Souna =

Nigerien politician

- Born: 1954 (age 71–72); Niger
- Citizenship: Nigerien
- Occupation: Politician

Issaka Souna (born 1954) is a Nigerien politician has been the Deputy Head of the United Nations Electoral Observation Mission in Burundi since 10 November 2014.

== Career ==
Souna headed the electoral supervisory body of Niger, the Commission électorale nationale indépendante (CENI), from mid-May 1999 for some duration of time. Souna has also served as the Nigerien Minister of Justice and President of the Bar. He later held the position of United Nations Director of Electoral Assistance in Côte d'Ivoire from 2011 to 2012. He also worked with the European Union on judiciary reforms programs in Niger and Madagascar.
