= Ousmane N'Gom Camara =

Guinean footballer (born 1975)

Ousmane Camara
Personal information
- Full name: Ousmane N'Gom Camara
- Date of birth: 26 May 1975 (age 51)
- Place of birth: Conakry, Guinea
- Height: 1.77 m (5 ft 10 in)
- Position: Wide midfielder

Senior career*
Years	Team	Apps	(Gls)
1992–1995	AS Kaloum	161	(5)
1995–1997	Mouscron	28	(2)
1997–1998	K.S.V. Waregem	27	(0)
1998–2002	K.V. Mechelen	97	(5)
2003–2004	KSK Heusden-Zolder	8	(0)
2004–2005	Konyaspor	22	(0)
2005–2007	Ethnikos Asteras	33	(0)
2008–2013	K. Londerzeel S.K.	10	(0)
2014–2015	AS Kaloum		

International career
1992–2005	Guinea	73	(2)
- * Club domestic league appearances and goals

Ousmane N'Gom Camara (born 26 May 1975) is a Guinean former professional footballer who played as a wide midfielder.

== Club career ==
Camara was born in Conakry. He joined Belgian club K. Londerzeel S.K. in 2008.

== International career ==
Camara was part of the Guinea national team at the 2004 African Nations Cup team, which finished second of its group in the first round of competition, before losing in the quarter-finals to Mali.

=== International goals ===
Scores and results list Guinea's goal tally first.

No	Date	Venue	Opponent	Score	Result	Competition
1.	14 May 2000	Estádio da Várzea, Praia, Cape Verde	Mali		2–0	2000 Amílcar Cabral Cup
2.	18 November 2005	Stade du 28 Septembre, Conakry, Guinea	Guinea-Bissau	2–2	2–2	2005 Amílcar Cabral Cup
