= Mamadouba Bangoura =

Guinean footballer

Personal information
- Date of birth: 20 March 2000 (age 26)
- Place of birth: Conakry, Guinea
- Height: 1.90 m (6 ft 3 in)
- Position: Forward

Senior career*
Years	Team	Apps	(Gls)
2018–2021	Kaloum		
2021	Shkupi		
2022	Hammam-Lif	4	(0)
2022–2023	Saint-Jean-le-Blanc		
2023–2024	AS Vita Club		

International career^{‡}
2019–	Guinea	7	(2)
- * Club domestic league appearances and goals as of 15 September 2022 ‡ National team caps and goals as of 6 February 2021

Mamadouba Bangoura (born 20 March 2000) is a Guinean professional footballer who most recently played as a forward for Linafoot club AS Vita Club and the Guinea national team.

== Club career ==
On 15 September 2022, Al-Minaa Club announced the signing of three professional players, including Bangoura.

== International career ==
On 21 September 2019, Bangoura won his first international cap with the Guinea national team against Senegal in an African Nations Championship qualification.

== Career statistics ==
Scores and results list Guinea's goal tally first.

No.	Date	Venue	Opponent	Score	Result	Competition
1	20 October 2019	Stade du 28 Septembre, Conakry, Guinea	Senegal	1–0	1–0	2020 African Nations Championship qualification
2	6 February 2021	Stade de la Réunification, Douala, Cameroon	Cameroon	2–0	2–0	2020 African Nations Championship

== Honours ==
Shkupi

- Macedonian First League runner-up: 2020–21
