= Issaka Samaké =

Malian footballer

Personal information
- Full name: Issaka Samaké
- Date of birth: 20 October 1994 (age 32)
- Place of birth: Bamako, Mali
- Height: 1.75 m (5 ft 9 in)
- Position: Defender

Team information
- Current team: Horoya AC

International career^{‡}
Years	Team	Apps	(Gls)
2013–	Mali	18	(2)
- ‡ National team caps and goals as of 7 February 2021

Issaka Samaké is a Malian football player, playing defense for Horoya AC and the Malian Football Federation.

== International career ==
In January 2014, coach Djibril Dramé, invited him to be a part of the Mali squad for the 2014 African Nations Championship. He helped the team reach the quarter finals where they lost to Zimbabwe by two goals to one.

=== International goals ===
Scores and results list Mali's goal tally first.

No.	Date	Venue	Opponent	Score	Result	Competition
1.	27 July 2019	Estádio Lino Correia, Bissau, Guinea-Bissau	Guinea-Bissau	3–0	4–0	2020 African Nations Championship qualification
2.	20 January 2021	Stade Ahmadou Ahidjo, Yaoundé, Cameroon	Burkina Faso	1–1	1–1	2020 African Nations Championship
