= Mamadou Coulibaly (footballer, born 1985) =

Malian footballer

Personal information
- Date of birth: 27 July 1985 (age 41)
- Place of birth: Bamako, Mali
- Height: 1.83 m (6 ft 0 in)
- Position: Forward

Team information
- Current team: Adama City

Senior career*
Years	Team	Apps	(Gls)
2008–2011	Stade Malien		(13)
2011–2012	FUS Rabat		
2012–2014	Stade Malien		
2014	Al-Hilal Omdurman		
2014–2015	Al Ahli Khartoum		
2015–2016	Stade Malien		
2016–2017	Dubai FC		
2017–2021	Stade Malien		
2021–	Adama City		

International career
2013–2021	Mali	13	(1)
- * Club domestic league appearances and goals as of 00:11, 26 March 2021 (UTC)

Mamadou Coulibaly (born 27 July 1985) is a Malian footballer who plays as a forward for Adama City and the Mali national team.

== International career ==
Diarra made his professional debut with the Mali national team in a 1–0 2014 African Nations Championship qualification loss to Guinea on 28 July 2013.

== Career statistics ==
=== International ===
Appearances and goals by national team and year
National team	Year	Apps	Goals
Mali	2013	1	0
Mali	2014	–	
Mali	2015	1	0
Mali	2016	6	0
Mali	2017	–	
Mali	2018	–	
Mali	2019	1	1
Mali	2020	–	
Mali	2021	4	0
Total		13	1

Scores and results list Mali's goal tally first, score column indicates score after each Coulibaly goal.

List of international goals scored by Mamadou Coulibaly
No.	Date	Venue	Opponent	Score	Result	Competition
1	20 October 2019	Stade Modibo Kéïta, Bamako, Mali	Mauritania	1–0	2–0	2020 African Nations Championship qualification
