= Limbe Stadium =

Multi-purpose stadium in Limbe, Cameroon

Coordinates: 4°01′35.3″N 9°09′38.0″E

Stade de Limbé
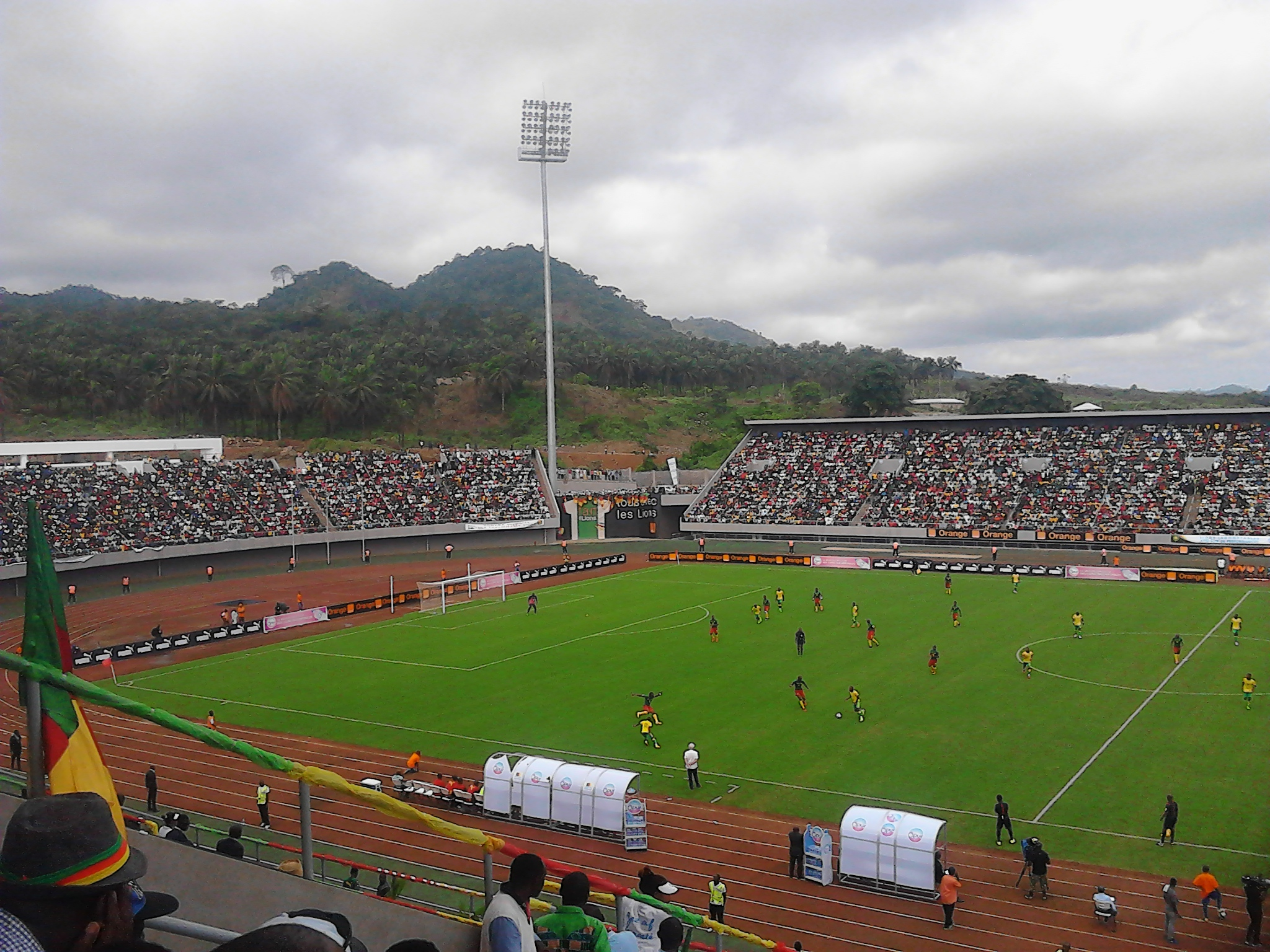
- Interactive map of Stade de Limbé
- Full name: Stade Omnisport de Limbé
- Location: Limbé, Cameroun
- Owner: Cameroonian Football Federation
- Capacity: 20,000
- Surface: Grass

Construction
- Groundbreaking: 2009
- Built: 2012
- Opened: 2016
- General contractor: CNEEC
- Main contractor: CMEC

Tenants
- Victoria United (2016–present); Cameroon national football team (selected matches)

Limbe Omnisport Stadium (French: Stade Omnisport de Limbé) is a multi-purpose stadium in Limbé, Cameroon. It is used mostly for football matches and it also has athletics facilities. The stadium has seats for 20,000 people. It was built in 2012 and inaugurated on January 26, 2016.

It is one of the few stadiums in the world that was built on a hill, and has views of the sea. In November 2016, the stadium hosted its first international tournament. The stadium was one of the venues for the 2021 Africa Cup of Nations.
