= Ahmadou Ahidjo Stadium =

Football stadium in Cameroon

- Mfandena
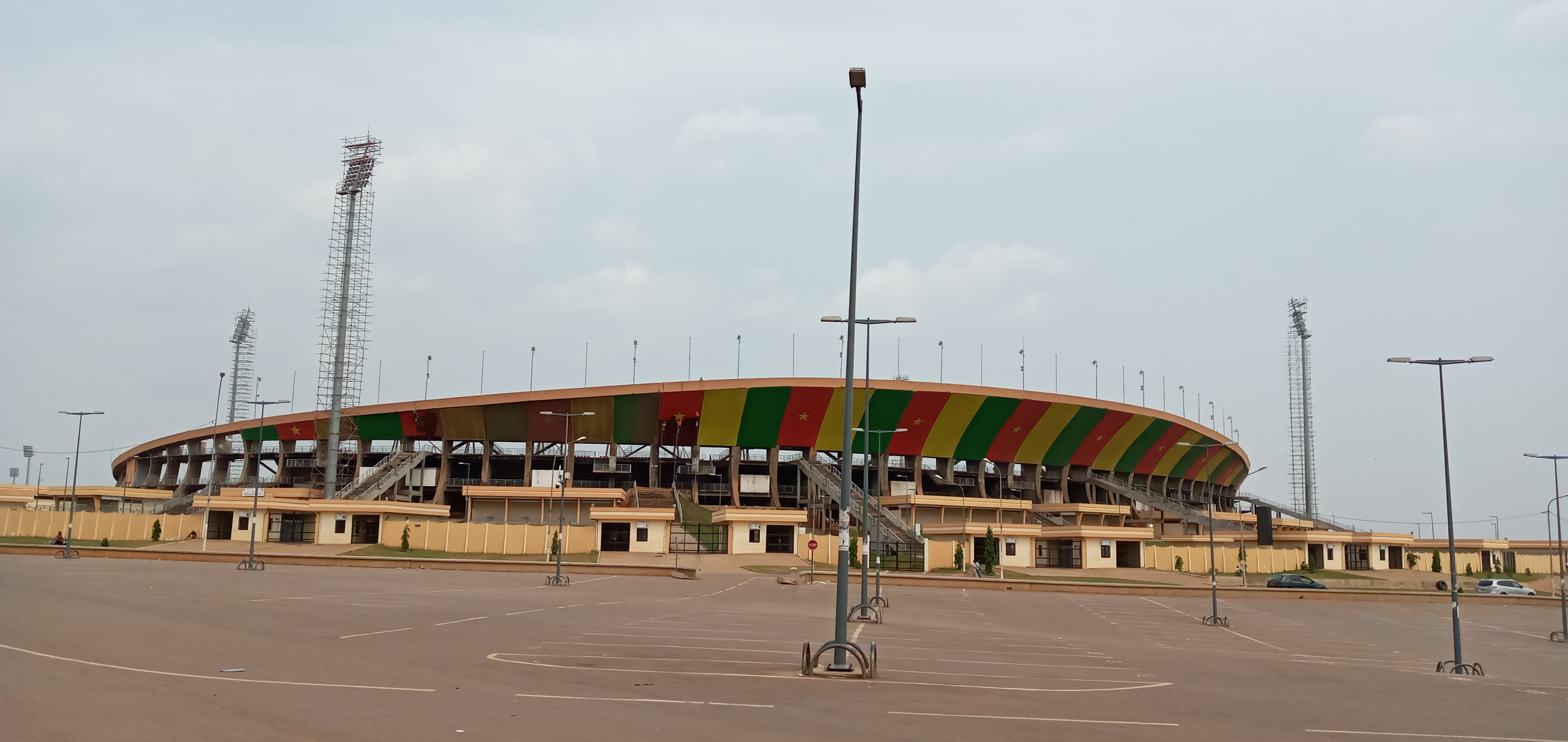
- The stadium prior to kickoff of Cameroon cup final 2016
- Interactive map of Ahmadou Ahidjo Stadium
- Full name: Ahmadou Ahidjo Stadium
- Former names: Stade Omnisports
- Location: Yaoundé, Cameroon
- Coordinates: 3°53′8″N 11°32′26″E
- Operator: Cameroonian Football Federation
- Capacity: 42,500
- Surface: Grass
- Scoreboard: Yes
- Record attendance: 120,000

Construction
- Opened: 1972
- Renovated: 2005, 2015–2016
- Architect: Arab contractors (2016 renovation)

Tenants
- Canon Yaoundé; Tonnerre Yaoundé; Louves Minproff; Cameroon national football team (1972–present)

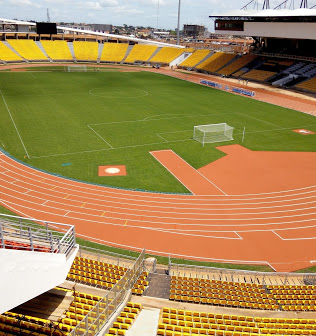
Stade Ahmadou Ahidjo, Mfandena, Yaoundé

Ahmadou Ahidjo Stadium is a multi-purpose stadium in Yaoundé, Cameroon. It is used mostly for football matches and it also has athletics facilities. It was built in 1972. The stadium has been renovated in 2016 ahead of the African Women Cup of Nations tournament. It has a capacity of 42,500 seats. It is the home stadium of Canon Yaoundé, Tonnerre Yaoundé and the women's club Louves Minproff. The stadium is also known as the home venue of the Cameroonian national football team, who drew the stadium's record attendance of 120,000 in a football match in the 1980s. It was one of the venues used in the 2021 Africa Cup of Nations.
