= Japoma Stadium =

Stadium in Douala, Cameroon

Stade de Japoma
- Exterior of the stadium
- Interactive map of Stade de Japoma
- Full name: Stade de Japoma
- Location: Japoma, Douala, Cameroon
- Coordinates: 4°00′20″N 9°49′31″E
- Owner: Cameroonian Football Federation
- Capacity: 50,000
- Surface: GrassMaster
- Scoreboard: Yes

Construction
- Groundbreaking: February 21, 2017
- Opened: December 29, 2020
- Cost: $232 million (estimated)
- Architect: AECOM
- General contractor: Yenigün Construction Industry

Tenant
- Cameroon national football team (selected matches)

Website
- https://japoma.org

The Japoma Stadium is a 50,000-capacity all-seater multi-purpose stadium in Douala, Cameroon. It is part of a sports complex that also consists of an indoor arena for basketball, handball, futsal and volleyball, tennis courts and an 8-lane Olympic-size swimming pool, as well as conference and commercial centres, a hotel and a parking lot. The stadium also has an athletic track.

The Japoma Stadium cost around $232 million, with 85% of the project financed by Turkish Türk Eximbank.

It hosted some matches of the 2021 Africa Cup of Nations. It also hosted the 2024 African Championships in Athletics.

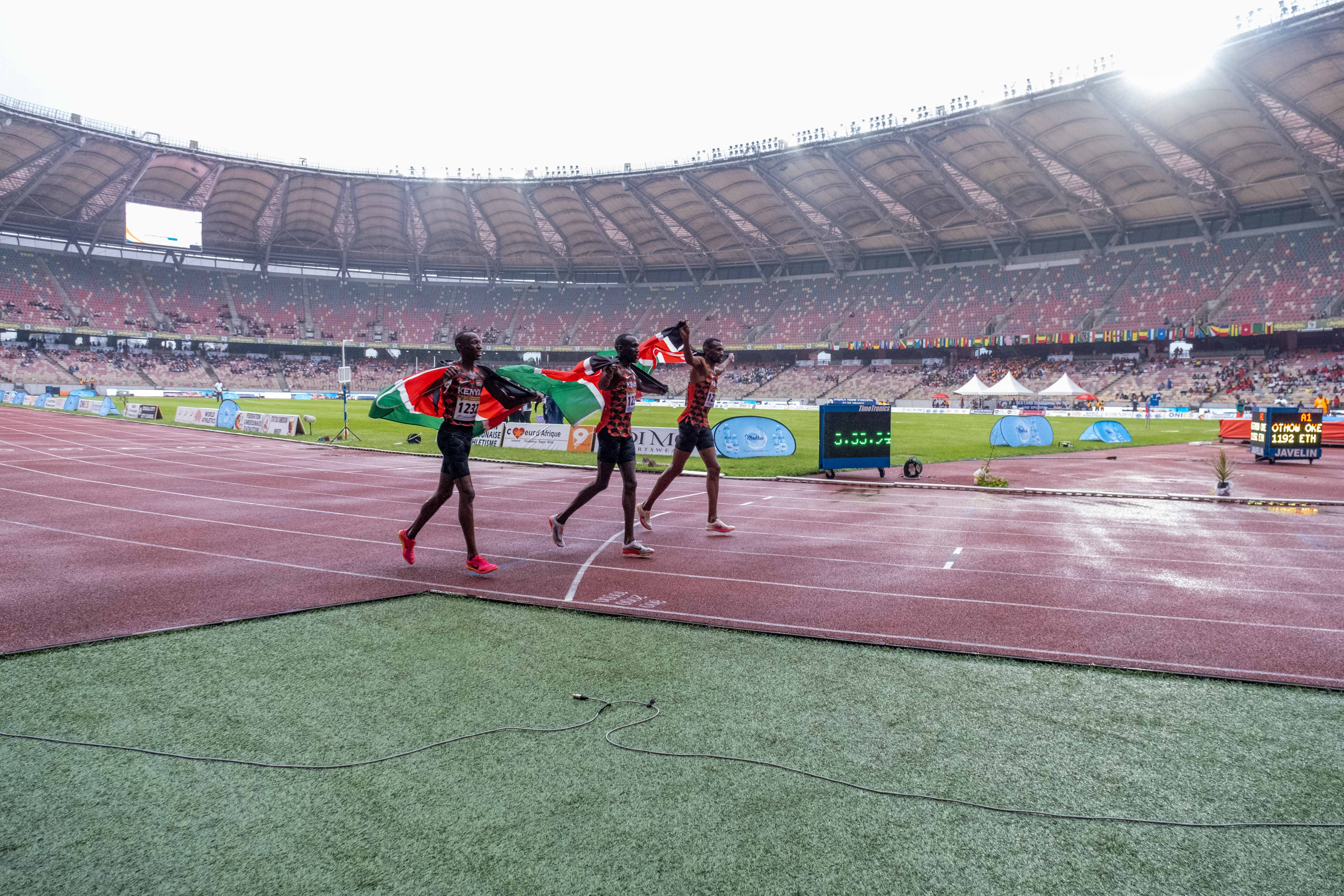
The interior of the stadium

== Construction ==
The construction of the Japoma Stadium began on February 21, 2017 and the completed stadium opened on 29 December 2020. The stadium was designed by British firm AECOM and management of the construction was entrusted to Leonardo Cameroun sarl, which belongs to Italian Leonardo srl.
