= 2020–21 FC Basel season =

FC Basel
2020–21 season
- Owner: FCB Holding; Bernhard Burgener
- Club president: Bernhard Burgener (until 16 November 2020); Reto Baumgartner (from 16 November 2020)
- Head coach: Ciriaco Sforza (until 6 April 2021); Patrick Rahmen (interim) (from 6 April 2021)
- Stadium: St. Jakob-Park
- Swiss Super League: 2nd
- Swiss Cup: Third round
- UEFA Europa League: Play-off round
- Top goalscorer: League: Arthur Cabral (18); All: Arthur Cabral (20)
- Highest home attendance: 9,257 (vs Luzern, 4 October 2020)
- Average home league attendance: 591
- Biggest win: 5–0 (vs Servette, 18 April 2021)
- Biggest defeat: 1–4 (vs Zürich, 23 January 2021)
Home colours	Away colours

The 2020–21 was FC Basel's 127th season in existence and the club's 26th consecutive season in the top flight of Swiss football since their promotion in the 1993–94 season. The 2020–21 Swiss Super League season started on the weekend 19–20 September 2020 and ended on 21 May 2021. In addition to the Swiss Super League, Basel also participated in this season's Swiss Cup and the UEFA Europa League.

== Club ==
=== FC Basel Holding AG ===
The FC Basel Holding AG (Holding) owns 75% of the club FC Basel (FC Basel 1893 AG) and the other 25% is owned by the club itself. As of the 2020 AGM in June, Bernhard Burgener owned about 82% of the shares in the Holding, David Degen owned 10% and about 8% was held by four small investors. At the FC Basel Holding AG AGM Marco Streller stood down from the board of directors. Bernhard Burgener, as chairman of the Holding, Roland Heri, as CEO of the club, Peter von Büren, as financial director and Karl Odermatt, as advisor, remained on the board of the Holding.

During the winter months, rumors were put into circulation that Burgener wanted to sell his shares in the Holding to a firm called Centricus, a London-based global investment firm. This caused diverse fan protests. Come the beginning of May, Burgener said he would sell his shares to a letterbox company called Basel Dream and Vision AG. The ferocity of the fan protests increased. Degen announced that he had a pre-sale right and to protect his rights Degen went the legal way. On 29 March the Holding announced that the board of directors of FC Basel Holding AG was restricted in its ability to act due to a super-provisional ruling caused by David Degen's action. Following numerous private discussions on this subject, on 11 May the Holding made the announcement that Bernhard Burgener and David Degen have come to an out-of-court settlement, in the best interests of FC Basel 1893, on the ownership structure of the Holding. David Degen took over all shares from Bernhard Burgener. With this result, the protests stopped and everything calmed down. The change of the board was terminated for 15 June 2021.

=== Club management ===
The club's 126th AGM was due to take place on 9 November 2020. But because of the situation in took place in written form during the week from 6 November to 13 November 2020. The board of directors up until this date under the holding owner Bernhard Burgener were: Burgener himself as president, CEO Roland Heri, financial manager Peter von Büren, as well as Marco Streller, Reto Baumgartner, Dominik Donzé and Benno Kaiser. Ruedi Zbinden had been sport director the previous year, but resigned on 18 August and returned to his previous job as chef scout.

Chairman	(Switzerland) Bernhard Burgener
Sport director	Vacant
CEO	(Switzerland) Roland Heri
Finances	(Switzerland) Peter von Büren
Director	(Switzerland) Marco Streller
Director	(Switzerland) Reto Baumgartner
Director	(Switzerland) Dominik Donzé
Director	(Switzerland) Benno Kaiser

Updated to match played 30 August 2020
Source: FCB Official Site

At the AGM the Bernhard Burgener as club chairman, Peter von Büren as finance director, and Streller stood down and vacated their positions. The directors Baumgartner, Donzé and Kaiser declared their willingness to continue. Eight further members of the club also declared themselves as candidates. There were 2589 votes with valid rights, the absolute majority was 1295. Baumgartner received 2382 votes, Donzé 1913 and Kaiser 1892 and these three were voted back onto the board. The other eight they failed to reach an absolute majority. For the position as club president Baumgartner received 2326 votes. Therefore, from 18 November the club's board is as follows:

Club chairman	(Switzerland) Reto Baumgartner
CEO	(Switzerland) Roland Heri
Sport director	Vacant
Director	(Switzerland) Dominik Donzé
Director	(Switzerland) Benno Kaiser
Ground (capacity and dimensions)	St. Jakob-Park (38,512 (37,500 for international matches) / 120x80 m)

Updated to match played 18 November 2020
Source: FCB Official Site

=== Team management ===
On 26 August the club announced that Ciriaco Sforza had been hired as the first team manager as of 1 September 2020. He had previously been head coach of FC Wil and he brought his assistant Daniel Hasler with him. Massimo Colomba stayed with the club as Goalkeeper Coach. On 21 September the club announced that they had hired Patrick Rahmen as second assistant trainer.

Youth coach Alex Frei had previously been trainer of the U-18 team and moved up to the U-21, but due to differences with the club directors he quit his job on 24 August. On 1 September the club announced that Matthias Kohler was hired as the new U-21 team trainer.

On 6 April 2021 the club announced that, due to the lack of sporting success, FC Basel 1893 were separating themselves from head coach Ciriaco Sforza with immediate effect. They also announced that they had separated themselves from Assistant manager Daniel Hasler at the same time. Until the end of the season, the first team would be looked after by the other previous assistant Patrick Rahmen, on an interim basis, as head coach. In the communique on the following day it was announced that Ognjen Zaric was appointed as assistant manager. Zaric had been coach of the Basel 1893 U-18 team since summer 2020 and before that he had been head coach of TSV 1860 Rosenheim in the Regionalliga Bayern, the fourth tier of German football.

Position	Staff
Manager	(Switzerland) Ciriaco Sforza until 6 April 2021
Manager	(Switzerland) Patrick Rahmen (interim) from 6 April 2021 to 30 June 2021
Assistant coach	(Switzerland) Daniel Hasler until 6 April 2021
Assistant coach	(Switzerland) Patrick Rahmen until 6 April 2021
Assistant coach	(Switzerland) Ognjen Zaric from 7 April 2021
Goalkeeper Coach	(Switzerland) Massimo Colomba
Team leader	(Switzerland) Gustav Nussbaumer
Youth Team U-21 Coach	(Switzerland) Alex Frei until 24 August 2020
Youth Team U-21 Coach	(Germany) Matthias Kohler from 1 September 2020
Youth Team U-21 Co-coach	(Switzerland) Daniel Stucki
Youth Team U-21 Co-coach	(Switzerland) Michaël Bauch

Source: FCB Official Site

== Overview ==
=== Off and pre-season ===
There were a number of changes in the squad during the summer break. Zdravko Kuzmanović, and Kevin Bua left the club because their contracts were not renewed. Edon Zhegrova, Emil Bergström and Eric Ramires also left the club and this because their loan periods had ended. Then on 12 August the club announced that Jonas Omlin was transferred out to Montpellier. After the season had started and the club failed to qualify for the group stage of the 2020–21 UEFA Europa League, the club made three announcements on 5 October, first that Blás Riveros had transferred to Brøndby, then that Kemal Ademi had moved on to Fenerbahçe and finally that Omar Alderete had been transferred to Hertha BSC.

In the other direction, the players Konstantinos Dimitriou, Julian Von Moos, Aldo Kalulu and Dimitri Oberlin were back in the Basel squad after being out on loan for the previous season. Arthur Cabral, who had been on loan from Palmeiras, was signed in on a perminat basis on a three-year contract. The contract with Ricky van Wolfswinkel had run out, but he signed in for another two years until the end of the 2021–22 season. On 11 September FCB announced that they had prolonged the contract with Taulant Xhaka until summer 2024. Then it was announced on 15 September that they had also prolonged the contract with captain Valentin Stocker.

Further, on 8 August the former Austria national team goalkeeper Heinz Lindner was signed in from Wehen Wiesbaden, with a three-year contract dated up until summer 2023. Then on 11 September Italian full-back Andrea Padula was signed in from FC Wil, where he had played the last half year under manager Ciriaco Sforza, also on a three-year contract. Somewhat surprising came the announcement on 19 September that Juventus had bought U-18 right back defender Albian Hajdari, but he stayed with the squad, being loaned back to Basel for two seasons.

The 2020–21 Swiss Super League started on 20 September, but then on 22 September the club announced that the Kosovar international Edon Zhegrova (whose loan from Genk had actually ended at the end of June) had also signed in new on a three-year contract. On 2 October it was announced that Jorge Marco de Oliveira Moraes, simply known as Jorge, had signed in on a loan contract from Monaco. On 7 October the club then announced that Swiss international player Timm Klose had been signed in on loan from Norwich City. Klose had played for the club as youth international, but had moved onto FC Thun in the 2011–12 Swiss Super League season to start his professional football career. Finally, only hours before the transfer-period closed, the club announced that Pajtim Kasami had signed in on a two-year contract. Kasami had previously played for Sion, but FC Sion's president Christian Constantin had terminated his contract with them, without notice, after he had failed to agree to an 80% salary pay cut during coronavirus pandemic. The transfer-period in Switzerland closed on 12 October at mid-night.

In total 12 players had left the club and 12 players had signed in.

=== Winter break transfer window ===
On the 5 December 2020 Basel announced that they had terminated the contract with Dimitri Oberlin, without stating the reason, but according to the media it had something to do with a non-corona-conform party. On 14 January the club then announced that they had loaned Tician Tushi out to FC Wil until the end of the season, so that he could gain more playing experience. His trainer in Wil would be Alex Frei who was his coach as he played with the Basel U-18 youth team. Basel's fourth goalkeeper Jozef Pukaj was loaned to Stade Lausanne Ouchy until 30 June 2021. On 27 January Basel announced that they had transferred Konstantinos Dimitriou to Mezőkövesdi SE. On the same day it was made public that Amir Abrashi had signed in on loan from Freiburg. On 30 January Gonçalo Cardoso also signed in on loan from West Ham. On 1 February the club announced that Samuele Campo had been loaned out to SV Darmstadt 98.

=== Second Half of Season ===
On 6 April 2021, Ciriaco Sforza was sacked "due to the recent poor results". Patrick Rahmen, the former assistant manager, took over as interim manager. Of FC Basel's recent nine games as of the sack, they only won a single match, drawing three, and losing four. The final blow came as Basel lost 1–2 against FC Vaduz, who were the bottom-placed team in the league at the time. After the change in management, results immediately improved. The won five of their next eight games, drawing twice, and only losing to the designated champions BSC Young Boys. On 11 May 2021 the FC Basel Holding AG chairman Bernhard Burgener and board member David Degen announced a transfer of ownership rights after months of massiv fan protests. The new owner David Degen announced his intention of making Patrick Rahmen the head coach for the coming season in recognition of his good work with the first team. Furthermore, Degen announced a complete restructuring of the shareholding structures and a new board, which includes former FC Basel manager Christian Gross.

== The Campaign ==
=== Domestic League ===
First half of season

The season started on the weekend of 19/20 September 2020. Basel's priority aim for the new season was to see if they could play for the league championship. On Monday 31 August 2020 the Swiss Football League (SFL) published the match schedule for the 2020–21 Swiss Super League. In a first step, the SFL published the schedule for the first 18 rounds, but only fixed times for the first nine rounds. The final schedule with all games for all 36 rounds will follow by the end of the year. FCB started into the new season on Sunday 20 September with the home game against newly promoted FC Vaduz in St. Jakob-Park. This ended with a disappointing 2–2 draw, Vaduz were twice able to equalise a Basel lead. In the next round Basel suffered a defeat against Servette before they achieved their first two victories against Luzern and St. Gallen. The team then suffered three defeats before they could record three successive victories. It was a continuous up and down, not just for Basel but for all teams, apart from Young Boys who opened a gap at the top of the table. At the end of the first half of the season Basel had taken in the second position in the table.

Second half of season

To the start of the second half of the season it was still a continuous up and down, again not just for Basel but for all teams, each team was winning one match and losing the next. No team was playing constant, except Young Boys who pulled away at the top of the table. Things turned worse for Basel. Three draws, five defeats and one single victory, as well as the out in the cup. The final blow came as Basel lost 1–2 against Vaduz, who were the bottom-placed team in the league at the time. Head coach Ciriaco Sforza was sacked the next day. Until the end of the season, the first team would be looked after by the other previous assistant Patrick Rahmen, on an interim basis. After the change in the team management, results immediately improved. The team won five of their next eight games, drawing twice, and only losing to the designated champions BSC Young Boys. The season can be described as disappointing, the season's aim was missed, the minimal aim was reached. But second place with a 31-point gap behind the new champions could not be described as good. The qualification to the newly created Europa Conference League second qualifying round was achieved.

Conclusion

BSC Young Boys won the championship and with 24 victories, nine draws and only two defeats. They obtained 81 points and as champions qualified for the 2021–22 Champions League second qualifying round. Basel, with 15 victories, eight draws and twelve defeats were second placed and together with third placed Servette, 14 victories, eight draws 13 defeats, qualified for the Europa Conference League second qualifying round. Sion, in the last game of the season, managed to climb from last position to second last and thus saved themselves from direct relegation and advanced to the promotion/relegation play-off. However, Vaduz slipped to bottom position and were relegated to next season's Challenge League, which is the second tier of Swiss football.

=== Domestic Cup ===
Basel's clear aim for the cup is to win the title. The first round of this season's Swiss Cup was played on the week-end 28 to 30 August and the second round was played on the week-end 11 to 13 September 2020. The four teams engaged in UEFA competitions received a bye in both these rounds and, therefore, Basel entered into the competition in the third round. Basel were drawn to play away against Winterthur from the Challenge League, the second tier of Swiss football, on 9 February 2021. Due to pitch conditions in the Stadion Schützenwiese in Winterthur the venue and date were changed and the match took place in the St. Jakob-Park on 17 February 2021 and it resulted in a debacle.

With a 2–6 defeat against Winterthur, FC Basel 1893 were knocked brutally out of the cup competition. In the first half nothing went for FCB. Red-blue certainly had to accept the reproach they defended too passively before the first goal and achieved very little going forwards. The outsiders went into an early lead and added a second just before half time. After the mediocre first half, in which the FCB also lacked the necessary competition luck, Rotblau missed the start of second half completely. Directly after the break FCW forwards played as they wished with the FCB defence and added three more goals within 10 minutes. Samir Ramizi twice, Roman Buess, Roberto Alves and Gezim Pepsi had scored to put FCW well in front before FCB could send out a small sign of life in the closing stages, with goals from Pajtim Kasami and Gonçalo Cardoso. The final point was another Winterthur goal from Anas Mahamid in the 86th minute.

Basel had missed their season's aim and that with a debacle. With the end score at 2–6 this also meant that this became the highest number of goals that the team had conceded in their home stadium since it was opened on 15 March 2001. The biggest defeats to this date were Manchester City 0–4 in the 2017–18 UEFA Champions League, Arsenal 1–4 in the 2016–17 UEFA Champions League and Barcelona 0–5 in the 2008–09 UEFA Champions League.

=== Europa League ===
Basel were qualified for the UEFA Europa League and started in the qualifying phase second qualifying round. The club's aim in this competition was to reach the group stage. The draw for the second qualifying round was held on 31 August 2020 and Basel were drawn with an away game against Osijek of Croatia.

Osijek

The match against Osijek was played on 17 September in their home stadium Stadion Gradski vrt and Basel won the game with 2–1. Arthur Cabral put the visitors one up after 18 minutes, the assist coming from Valentin Stocker. Stocker himself pu them two up shortly before half time, the assist coming from Afimico Pululu. Basel controlled the game the entire time, but Ante Majstorović pulled one back six minutes from time.

Anorthosis Famagusta

In the third qualifying round, to be played one week later on 24 September at home in the St. Jakob-Park and Basel were drawn against Anorthosis Famagusta. This game was won 3–2. Basel took control of the game from the very start, but Valentin Stocker's shot in the first minute was blocked. Three minutes later Silvan Widmer scored to put the home team one up. Samuele Campo added the second after 12 minutes and an own goal from Hovhannes Hambardzumyan put Basel three up after 21 minutes. Basel lost their thred shortly before half time and Branko Vrgoč pulled one back. In the second period Basel were no longer dominant. Despite the fact that Tornike Okriashvili received the second yellow card and was sent off, Anorthosis found their way back into the game. Anorthosis were awarded a penalty in the after 67 minutes and Kvilitaia scored from the spot. Basel hung on to the lead despite the fact that Von Moos was sent off for receiving a second yellow card.

CSKA Sofia

In the play-off round Basel were drawn at home against CSKA Sofia on 1 October 2020. Basel played a good first half and had six or seven good chances, while CSKA only had two. Despite taking the lead after 54 minutes through a Penalty spot goal from Arthur Cabral, Basel's performance got worse and CSKA were able to get into the game. Substitute Tiago Rodrigues scored the equaliser 13 minutes after coming on just 18 minutes from time. CSKA pushed forward on Basel, who seemed to tire under the pressure. Two minutes from time, as it seemed the match would go in extra time Rodrigues added his second and Basel fell apart. The added time was six minutes and with the last shot of the game Ahmed Ahmedov netted a third for the visitors. Basel lost 1–3 after full-time and failed to qualify for the group stage and therefore missed their European aim.

== Players ==
=== First-team squad ===
The following is the list of the Basel first team squad. It also includes players that were in the squad the day the season started on 19 September 2020, but subsequently left the club after that date.

Note: Flags indicate national team as defined under FIFA eligibility rules; some limited exceptions apply. Players may hold more than one non-FIFA nationality.

No.	Pos.	Nation	Player
1	GK	SRB	Đorđe Nikolić
—	DF	GRE	Konstantinos Dimitriou (to Mezőkövesdi SE)
3	DF	POR	Gonçalo Cardoso (on loan from West Ham)
4	DF	SUI	Eray Cömert
5	DF	SUI	Silvan Widmer
6	DF	PAR	Omar Alderete (to Hertha BSC)
6	MF	ALB	Amir Abrashi (on loan from Freiburg)
7	MF	SUI	Luca Zuffi
8	MF	SUI	Yannick Marchand
9	FW	NED	Ricky van Wolfswinkel
10	MF	SUI	Samuele Campo (loan to Darmstadt 98)
11	FW	ANG	Afimico Pululu
13	GK	AUT	Heinz Lindner
14	MF	SUI	Valentin Stocker (captain)
15	DF	PAR	Blas Riveros (to Brøndby)
17	DF	SUI	Timm Klose (on loan from Norwich City)
18	FW	SUI	Julian Von Moos
19	FW	SUI	Dimitri Oberlin (to Bayern Munich II)
19	FW	SUI	Darian Males (on loan from Inter Milan)
20	MF	SUI	Fabian Frei (vice-captain)

No.	Pos.	Nation	Player
21	DF	SUI	Jasper van der Werff (on loan from Red Bull Salzburg)
22	MF	SUI	Orges Bunjaku
23	MF	SUI	Pajtim Kasami
24	FW	SUI	Tician Tushi (loan to FC Wil)
26	MF	FRA	Aldo Kalulu
28	DF	ITA	Raoul Petretta
30	MF	KOS	Edon Zhegrova
31	FW	SUI	Carmine Chiappetta
32	MF	SUI	Yannick Marchand
34	MF	ALB	Taulant Xhaka (vice-captain)
39	DF	SUI	Louis Lurvink (from U-21)
44	GK	SUI	Jozef Pukaj
46	GK	SUI	Felix Gebhardt
47	DF	SUI	Elis Isufi
72	MF	ITA	Andrea Padula
76	MF	SUI	Albian Hajdari (on loan from Juventus)
77	FW	SEN	Kaly Sene
96	DF	BRA	Jorge (on loan from Monaco)
98	FW	BRA	Arthur Cabral
99	FW	GER	Kemal Ademi (to Fenerbahçe)

=== Transfers summer 2020 ===
==== In ====
Note: Flags indicate national team as defined under FIFA eligibility rules; some limited exceptions apply. Players may hold more than one non-FIFA nationality.

No.	Pos.	Nation	Player
3	DF	GRE	Konstantinos Dimitriou (returned after loan to Wil)
13	GK	AUT	Heinz Lindner (from Wehen Wiesbaden)
17	DF	SUI	Timm Klose (from Norwich City)
18	FW	SUI	Julian Von Moos (returned after loan to Wil)
23	MF	SUI	Pajtim Kasami (was not under contract)
26	MF	FRA	Aldo Kalulu (returned after loan to Swansea City)

No.	Pos.	Nation	Player
27	FW	SUI	Dimitri Oberlin (returned after loan to Zulte Waregem)
30	MF	KOS	Edon Zhegrova (from Genk)
72	MF	ITA	Andrea Padula (from Wil)
76	MF	SUI	Albian Hajdari (on loan from Juventus)
96	DF	BRA	Jorge (on loan from Monaco)
98	FW	BRA	Arthur Cabral (from Palmeiras)

==== Out ====
Note: Flags indicate national team as defined under FIFA eligibility rules; some limited exceptions apply. Players may hold more than one non-FIFA nationality.

No.	Pos.	Nation	Player
—	GK	SUI	Jonas Omlin (to Montpellier)
—	MF	SRB	Zdravko Kuzmanović (end of contract)
6	DF	PAR	Omar Alderete (to Hertha BSC)
15	DF	PAR	Blas Riveros (to Brøndby)
—	DF	SUI	Yves Kaiser (to Xamax)
—	MF	SUI	Martin Liechti

No.	Pos.	Nation	Player
—	MF	SUI	Dominik Schmid (to Grasshopper Club)
—	MF	BRA	Eric Ramires (end of loan from Bahia)
—	MF	SWE	Emil Bergström (end of loan from Utrecht)
—	MF	SUI	Kevin Bua (end of contract)
—	MF	SUI	Albian Hajdari (to Juventus)
—	FW	GER	Kemal Ademi (to Fenerbahçe)

=== Transfers winter break ===
==== In ====
Note: Flags indicate national team as defined under FIFA eligibility rules; some limited exceptions apply. Players may hold more than one non-FIFA nationality.

No.	Pos.	Nation	Player
6	MF	ALB	Amir Abrashi (on loan from Freiburg)
3	DF	POR	Gonçalo Cardoso (on loan from West Ham)

No.	Pos.	Nation	Player
19	FW	SUI	Darian Males (on loan from Inter Milan)
77	FW	SEN	Kaly Sene

==== Out ====
Note: Flags indicate national team as defined under FIFA eligibility rules; some limited exceptions apply. Players may hold more than one non-FIFA nationality.

No.	Pos.	Nation	Player
—	MF	SUI	Samuele Campo (loan to SV Darmstadt 98 until 30 June 2021)
—	DF	GRE	Konstantinos Dimitriou (to Mezőkövesdi SE)

No.	Pos.	Nation	Player
—	FW	SUI	Dimitri Oberlin (end of contract)
—	GK	SUI	Jozef Pukaj (loan to Stade Lausanne Ouchy until 2 April 2021)
24	FW	SUI	Tician Tushi (loan to FC Wil until 30 June 2021)

== Results and fixtures ==
=== Legend ===
Win Draw Loss Postponed Fixtures

=== Friendly matches ===
==== Pre- and mid-season ====
11 September 2020 Pre-season	Basel	1–5	1. FC Saarbrücken	Youth Campus Basel, Münchenstein
14:00	Pululu (yellow card) 42'; Tushi 90+2'	FCB summary	Jacob 7', 17'; Jänicke 10', 48'; Përdedaj 51'	Attendance: 0 Referee: Adrien Jaccottet

28 October 2020 Mid-season	Basel	5–3	Xamax	Youth Campus Basel, Münchenstein
15:00	Cabral 12'; Frei 20' (pen.); Cabral 40'; Stocker 45+1' van Wolfswinkel 73'	Report	23' Saiz; (yellow card) 24' Mafouta; 38' Dominguez; 88' Epitaux	Attendance: 0 Referee: (Switzerland) Sven Wolfensberger

11 November 2020 Mid-season	Basel	4–4	Kriens	Youth Campus Basel, Münchenstein
15:00	Von Moos 26'; Kasami 82' van Wolfswinkel 86'; Campo 89' (pen.)	Summary	36' Rustemoski; 38' Rustemoski; 60' Rustemoski; 69' (pen.) Tadić; (yellow card) 84' Mulaj	Attendance: 0 Referee: (Switzerland) Lionel Tschudi

12 November 2020 Mid-season	Basel	4–0	Schaffhausen	Youth Campus Basel, Münchenstein
14:00	Chipperfield 32'; Cabral 36'; Kalulu 38'; Vesco 90'	Summary		Attendance: 0 Referee: Alessandro Dudic

==== Winter break ====
9 January 2021 Winter break	Basel	2–2	Thun	Youth Campus Basel, Münchenstein
11:00	Frei 7' (pen.) van Wolfswinkel 27'	FCB summary	7' Karlen; 24' Hefti; (yellow card) 81' Havenaar	Attendance: 0 Referee: Adrien Jaccottet (Basel)

13 January 2021 Winter break	Aarau	0–5	Basel	Youth Campus Basel, Münchenstein
15:00		FCB summary	18' (0:1) Frei; 27' (0:2) Cabral; 48' (0:3) van Wolfswinkel; 80' (0:4) Zhegrova; 89' (0:5) van Wolfswinkel	Attendance: 0 Referee: (Switzerland) David Huwiler
Note: was due to be played in Stadion Brügglifeld in Aarau, but because of weather conditions the ground was swapped.

16 January 2021 Winter break	Basel	P–P	Chiasso	Youth Campus Basel, Münchenstein
		Summary
Note: canceled due to weather conditions

25 March 2021 Winter break	SC Freiburg	2–0	Basel	Schwarzwald-Stadion, Freiburg
14:00	Til 15'; Schmid 84'	FCB summary		Referee: Matthias Jöllenbeck

== Competitions ==
=== Overview ===
Competition	First match	Last match	Starting round	Final position	Record							
Competition	First match	Last match	Starting round	Final position	Pld	W	D	L	GF	GA	GD	Win %
Swiss Super League	20 September 2020	May 2021	Matchday 1		23	9	6	8	33	33	+0	39.13
Swiss Cup	17 February 2021		Third round	Third round	1	0	0	1	2	6	−4	0.00
Europa League	17 September 2020	1 October 2020	Second qualifying round	Play-off round	3	2	0	1	6	6	+0	66.67
Total					27	11	6	10	41	45	−4	40.74

Last updated: 3 March 2021
Source: Soccerway

=== Swiss Super League ===
==== Results summary ====
Overall								Home						Away					
Pld	W	D	L	GF	GA	GD	Pts	W	D	L	GF	GA	GD	W	D	L	GF	GA	GD
36	15	8	13	60	53	+7	53	9	6	3	35	21	+14	6	2	10	25	32	−7

Last updated: 21 May 2021.
Source: FBref

==== Results by round ====
Round	1	2	3	4	5	6	7	8	9	10	11	12	13	14	15	16	17	18	19	20	21	22	23	24	25	26	27	28	29	30	31	32	33	34	35	36
Ground	H	A	H	A	H	A	H	A	H	H	A	H	A	H	H	A	H	A	H	A	H	A	H	A	H	A	H	A	H	A	A	H	A	H	H	A
Result	D	L	W	L	W	W	W	W	L	D	W	L	D	W	L	W	D	W	D	L	D	L	D	L	W	L	L	W	W	D	D	W	L	W	W	L
Position	5	2	2	2	2	2	2	2	2	2	2	2	2	2	4	2	2	2	2	2	2	2	2	2	2	2	2	2	2	2	2	2	2	2	2	2

Updated to match(es) played on 21 May 2021. Source: FBref
A = Away; H = Home; W = Win; D = Draw; L = Loss

==== First half of season ====
On Monday 31 August 2020 the Swiss Football League (SFL) published the schedule for the Raiffeisen Super League 2020–21. In a first step, the SFL published the schedule for the first 18 rounds, but only fixed times for the first nine rounds. The final schedule with all games for all 36 rounds followed at the end of the year.

20 September 2020 Round 1	Basel	2–2	Vaduz	St. Jakob-Park, Basel
16:00	Cabral 5'; Stocker 38'; Fabian Frei (yellow card) 56'	FCB report	29' Sutter; (yellow card) 39' Wieser; (yellow card) 40' Milinceanu; 78' Milinceanu	Attendance: 1,000; Referee: (Switzerland) Fedayi San (Gebenstorf)

27 September 2020 Round 2	Servette	1–0	Basel	Stade de Genève, Geneva
16:00	Cespedes (yellow card) 13'; Stevanović (yellow card) 51'; Schalk 77' (pen.)	FCB report	(yellow card) 7' Bunjaku; (red card) 30' van der Werff; (yellow card) 59' van Wolfswinkel; (yellow card) 61' Nikolić	Attendance: 1,000; Referee: (Switzerland) Luca Piccolo

4 October 2020 Round 3	Basel	3–2	Luzern	St. Jakob-Park, Basel
16:00	Cabral 11'; Zhegrova (yellow card) 21'; Zhegrova 36'; Pululu (yellow card) 70'; Bunjaku (yellow card) 73'; Stocker 77'	FCB report	(yellow card) 15' Ndenge; 34' Schaub; (yellow card) 35' Sidler; (yellow card) 42' Knezevic; 58' Lucas; (yellow card) 60' Bürki; (yellow card) 70' Ugrinic	Attendance: 9,257; Referee: (Switzerland) Alain Bieri (Solothurn)

18 October 2020 Round 4	Zürich	P–P	Basel	Letzigrund, Zürich
16:00		FCB report

25 October 2020 Round 5	Basel	P–P	Lausanne-Sport	St. Jakob-Park, Basel
16:00		FCB report

1 November 2020 Round 6	St. Gallen	1–3	Basel	Kybunpark, St. Gallen
16:00	Duah 13'; Quintillà (yellow card) 35'; Stillhart (yellow card) 63'	FCB report	6' (yellow card) 19' Cabral; 39' F. Frei; 71' Kasami	Attendance: 50; Referee: (Switzerland) Lukas Fähndrich

4 November 2020 Round 4	Zürich	1–0	Basel	Letzigrund, Zürich
16:00	Doumbia (yellow card) 21'; Marchesano 46'	FCB report	(yellow card) 21' van der Werff	Attendance: 50; Referee: (Switzerland) Alain Bieri (Solothurn)

8 November 2020 Round 7	Basel	P–P	Sion	St. Jakob-Park, Basel
16:00		FCB report

21 November 2020 Round 8	Young Boys	2–1	Basel	Stadion Wankdorf, Bern
19:00	Sierro (yellow card) 21'; Nsame 41'; Elia 61'	FCB report	22' (pen.) Cabral; (yellow card) 43' Pululu; (yellow card) 77' Cabral	Attendance: 50; Referee: (Switzerland) Fedayi San (Gebenstorf)
Note: Debut for Chiappetta

25 November 2020 Round 5	Basel	2–1	Lausanne-Sport	St. Jakob-Park, Basel
18:15	Stocker 41'; Kasami (yellow card) 66'; Padula (yellow card) 73'; Kasami 76'	FCB report	(yellow card) 15' Geissmann; (yellow card) 54' Zekhnini; 90+2' Guessand	Attendance: 0 Referee: (Switzerland) Stefan Horisberger

29 November 2020 Round 9	Lugano	1–0	Basel	Cornaredo, Lugano
16:00	Gerndt (yellow card) 34'; Macek (yellow card) 39'; Guerrero (yellow card) 82'; Bottani 90+2'	FCB report	(yellow card) 25' Hajdari	Attendance: 30; Referee: (Switzerland) Lionel Tschudi (Neuchâtel)

5 December 2020 Round 10	Basel	1–0	Servette	St. Jakob-Park, Basel
20:30	Widmer (yellow card) 11'; Cabral (yellow card) 43'; Kasami 51'; Klose (yellow card) 74'; Frei (yellow card) 79'	FCB report	(yellow card) 19' Kyei; (yellow card) 42' Ondoua; (yellow card) 45+1' Sauthier; (yellow card) 79' Imeri; (yellow card) 85' Valls	Attendance: 0 Referee: (Switzerland) Alessandro Dudic

9 December 2020 Round 7	Basel	4–2	Sion	St. Jakob-Park, Basel
18:15	Klose 10'; Kasami 36' 81'; Arthur Cabral 40'; Von Moos (yellow card) 67'	FCB report	Grgić 27' (pen.); Uldriķis 61'; Karlen (yellow card) 90+2'	Attendance: 15; Referee: (Switzerland) Urs Schnyder

12 December 2020 Round 11	Vaduz	0–2	Basel	Rheinpark Stadion, Vaduz
20:30	Coulibaly (yellow card) 21'; Cicek (yellow card) 32'; Prokopič (yellow card) 60' (yellow-red card) 68'	FCB report	Zhegrova (yellow card) 45+1'; Marchand (yellow card) 48' (goal) 62'; Afimico Pululu 55'; Petretta (yellow card) 61'; Lindner (yellow card) 79'	Attendance: 5 Referee: (Switzerland) Adrien Jaccottet

16 December 2020 Round 12	Basel	0–2	Young Boys	St. Jakob-Park, Basel
20:30	Jorge (yellow card) 38'	FCB report	Elia 12'; Nsame 20' (yellow card) 90+3'; Hefti (yellow card) 57'; Martins (yellow card) 75'; Zesiger (yellow card) 89'	Attendance: 0 Referee: (Switzerland) Sandro Schärer

19 December 2020 Round 13	Basel	0–0	St. Gallen	St. Jakob-Park, Basel
20:30	Marchand (yellow card) 60'	FCB report	Babic (yellow card) 36'	Attendance: 0 Referee: (Switzerland) Fedayi San

23 December 2020 Round 14	Luzern	1–2	Basel	Swissporarena, Luzern
18:15	Emini (yellow card) 50'; Schürpf 66'	FCB report	Arthur Cabral 23'; Kasami 36' (yellow card) 38'	Attendance: 0 Referee: (Switzerland) Alain Bieri

23 January 2021 Round 15	Basel	1–4	Zürich	St. Jakob-Park, Basel
20:30	Arthur Cabral 75'	FCB report	Cömert 67' (o.g.); Sobiech 73'; Frei 80' (o.g.); Marchesano 90+4' (pen.)	Referee: (Switzerland) Sandro Schärer

28 January 2021 Round 16	Sion	2–3	Basel	Stade Tourbillon, Sion
20:30	Lacroix (yellow card) 44'; Karlen 76', 82'	FCB report	Klose 16'; Kasami 25' van Wolfswinkel 79'	Attendance: 0 Referee: (Switzerland)

31 January 2021 Round 17	Basel	2–2	Lugano	St. Jakob-Park, Basel
16:00	Cömert (yellow card) 71'; Cabral 84'; Jasper van der Werff 90'	FCB report	Abubakar 36'; Sabbatini (yellow card) 73'; Lungoyi 87'; Baumann (yellow card) 90+3'	Attendance: 0 Referee: (Switzerland) Lionel Tschudi

4 February 2021 Round 18	Lausanne-Sport	1–3	Basel	Stade de la Tuilière, Lausanne
20:30	Nanizayamo (yellow card) 52'; Mahou (yellow card) 60'; Lukembila 85'	FCB report	Stocker 16'; Marchand (yellow card) 19'; Cabral 52', 69'	Attendance: 0 Referee: (Switzerland) Alessandro Dudic

==== Second half of season ====
7 February 2021 Round 19	Basel	2–2	Sion	St. Jakob-Park, Basel
20:15	Cabral 33'; Kasami 37'; Cömert (yellow card) 51'; Stocker (yellow card) 67'; Klose (yellow card) 81'	FCB report	Iapichino (yellow card) 9'; Abdellaoui (yellow card) 27'; Uldriķis (yellow card) 40'; Clemenza (yellow card) 41' (yellow-red card) 83'; Wesley 53'; Uldriķis 57'; Fayulu (yellow card) 90+2'	Attendance: 5 Referee: (Switzerland) Schnyder
Note: COVID-19 pandemic in Switzerland

14 February 2021 Round 20	Zürich	2–0	Basel	Letzigrund, Zürich
16:00	Aliti (yellow card) 17'; Marchesano 26' (pen.); Nathan (yellow card) 40'; Kramer (yellow card) 77' (goal) 90+2'	report Report	Frei (yellow card) 90+3'	Attendance: 0 Referee: (Switzerland) Lukas Fähndrich
Note: COVID-19 pandemic in Switzerland

20 February 2021 Round 21	Basel	0–0	Lausanne-Sport	St. Jakob-Park, Basel
20:30	Cömert (red card) 20'; Frei (yellow card) 27'; Lindner (yellow card) 86'	FCB report Report	Mahou (yellow card) 21'; Barès (yellow card) 58'; Bolingi (yellow card) 75'	Attendance: 0 Referee: (Switzerland) Fedayi San
Note: COVID-19 pandemic in Switzerland

27 February 2021 Round 22	St. Gallen	3–1	Basel	Kybunpark, St. Gallen
20:30	Stillhart (yellow card) 5'; Görtler 35'; Duah 70' (pen.); Jordi Quintillà 76'; Nuhu (yellow card) 90+2'	FCB report Report	Gonçalo Cardoso (yellow card) 37'; Arthur Cabral 90+1'	Attendance: 0 Referee: (Switzerland) Sandro Schärer
Note: COVID-19 pandemic in Switzerland

3 March 2021 Round 23	Basel	1–1	Young Boys	St. Jakob-Park, Basel
20:30	Males 20'; Klose (yellow card) 47'	FCB report	Lauper 26'; Aebischer (yellow card) 39'	Attendance: 0 Referee: (Switzerland) Fedayi San
Note: COVID-19 pandemic in Switzerland

6 March 2021 Round 24	Servette	2–1	Basel	Stade de Genève, Geneva
20:30	Severin (yellow card) 39'; Kyei 62'; Ondoua 71'	FCB report	(yellow card) 49' Cardoso; 90+3' Cabral	Attendance: 0 Referee: (Switzerland) Alessandro Dudic
Note: COVID-19 pandemic in Switzerland

13 March 2021 Round 25	Basel	4–1	Luzern	St. Jakob-Park, Basel
20:30	Petretta 33'; Hunziker (yellow card) 72'; Frei 74'; Zhegrova 88'; Durrer 90+5'	FCB report	55' (yellow card) 38' Schaub; (yellow card) 83' Ndiaye	Attendance: 0 Referee: (Switzerland) Fedayi San
Note: League debut for Andrin Hunziker

21 March 2021 Round 26	Lugano	2–1	Basel	Cornaredo, Lugano
16:00	Sabbatini (yellow card) 4'; Lovrić (yellow card) 15' (goal) 60'; Lavanchy (yellow card) 71'; Bottani 76'	FCB report	(yellow card) 2' Widmer; 22' Cabral	Attendance: 0 Referee: (Switzerland) Urs Schnyder

5 April 2021 Round 27	Basel	1–2	Vaduz	St. Jakob-Park, Basel
16:00	Frei (yellow card) 23'; Simani 56' (o.g.); Sene (yellow card) 83'; Widmer (yellow card) 90+2'	FCB report	(yellow card) 23' Simani; 37' Schmied; 90+3' Schmid	Attendance: 0 Referee: (Switzerland) Nikolaj Hänni

10 April 2021 Round 28	Luzern	3–4	Basel	Swissporarena, Luzern
20:30	Schaub 3' (1:0); Emini (yellow card) 22'; Ndiaye 64' (2:3); Schaub 83' (3:3); (yellow card) 90+2' Alabi	FCB report	14' (1:1) Males; 18' (1:2) Zhegrova; 22' (1:3) Zhegrova; (yellow card) 61' Cabral; (yellow card) 68' Zuffi; (yellow card) 84' Frei; (yellow card) 84' Widmer; 90+30' (3:4) Cabral	Attendance: 0 Referee: (Switzerland) Fedayi San

18 April 2021 Round 29	Basel	5–0	Servette	St. Jakob-Park, Basel
16:00	Frei 3' (pen.); Kasami 6' van Wolfswinkel 9'; Zhegrova (yellow card) 46'; Pululu 86'; Pululu 87'	FCB report	(yellow card) 26' Diallo; (red card) 35' Sauthier	Attendance: 0 Referee: (Switzerland)

21 April 2021 Round 30	Vaduz	1–1	Basel	Rheinpark Stadion, Vaduz
20:30	Gajić 83' (pen.)	SFV summary FCB report	(yellow card) 7' Zuffi; (yellow card) 19' Zhegrova; (yellow card) 44' Petretta; 79' Kasami; (yellow card) 86' Frei	Attendance: 25; Referee: (Switzerland) Lukas Fähndrich

24 April 2021 Round 31	Lausanne-Sport	3–3	Basel	Stade de la Tuilière, Lausanne
20:30	Mahou 10'; Kukuruzović 29'; Loosli (yellow card) 31'; Puertas (yellow card) 38'; Boranijašević 82'; Thomas (yellow card) 89'	FCB report	32' Cabral; 76' Cabral; (yellow card) 79' Widmer; (yellow card) 80' Stocker; 85' Stocker	Attendance: 100; Referee: (Switzerland) Stefan Horisberger

1 May 2021 Round 32	Basel	1–0	St. Gallen	St. Jakob-Park, Basel
20:30	Cabral (yellow card) 45'; Frei (yellow card) 45'; Cabral 67'	FCB report		Attendance: 100; Referee: (Switzerland) Sandro Schärer

8 May 2021 Round 33	Young Boys	2–0	Basel	Stadion Wankdorf, Bern
20:30	Camara (yellow card) 13'; Fassnacht 71'Martins 72'	FCB report	(yellow card) 87' Van Wolfswinkel	Attendance: 100; Referee: (Switzerland) Lionel Tschudi

11 May 2021 Round 34	Basel	2–0	Lugano	St. Jakob-Park, Basel
20:30	Kasami 19'; Stocker 24'; Cömert (yellow card) 36'; Abrashi (yellow card) 70'; Klose (yellow card) 72'	FCB report	(yellow card) 77' Jacobacci	Attendance: 100; Referee: (Switzerland) Lionel Tschudi

15 May 2021 Round 35	Basel	4–0	Zürich	St. Jakob-Park, Basel
20:30	Petretta 21'; Zhegrova 30'; Kasami 63'; Petretta 77'; Cabral (yellow card) 86'	FCB report	(red card) 4' Nathan; (yellow card) 40' Schönbächler; (yellow card) 40' Domgjoni; (yellow card) 71' Kramer	Attendance: 100; Referee: (Switzerland) Alain Bieri (Solothurn)

21 May 2021 Round 36	Sion	4–0	Basel	Stade Tourbillon, Sion
20:30	Abdellaoui (yellow card) 5'; Karlen 9' 35'; Batata 34'; Tosetti (yellow card) 39'; Hoarau 58'	FCB report Report	Kasami (yellow card) 19'; Arthur Cabral (yellow card) 39'	Attendance: 100; Referee: (Switzerland) Alain Bieri

==== Final league table ====
Pos	Team	Pld	W	D	L	GF	GA	GD	Pts	Qualification or relegation
1	Young Boys (C)	36	25	9	2	74	29	+45	84	Qualification for the Champions League second qualifying round
2	Basel	36	15	8	13	60	53	+7	53	Qualification for the Europa Conference League second qualifying round
3	Servette	36	14	8	14	45	56	−11	50	Qualification for the Europa Conference League second qualifying round
4	Lugano	36	12	13	11	40	42	−2	49	
5	Luzern	36	12	10	14	62	59	+3	46	Qualification for the Europa Conference League third qualifying round (Note: Luzern qualified for the Europa Conference League third qualifying round as winners of the 2020–21 Swiss Cup.)

Source: Swiss Super League
Rules for classification: 1) Points; 2) Goal difference; 3) Goals scored; 4) Head-to-head goal difference; 5) Away goals scored; 6) Draw.
(C) Champions

=== Swiss Cup ===
The draw for the first round was held in August 2020. The Super League and Challenge League clubs were seeded and could not be drawn against each other. The lower division teams were granted home advantage three rounds. All teams in the Super League were granted a bye in the first round and all teams engaged in UEFA competitions received a bye in the second round as well. Therefore, Basel enter the competition in the third round.

17 February 2021 Round 3	Winterthur	6–2	Basel	Basel
17:30	Gantenbein (yellow card) 13'; Ramizi 18' 60'; Buess 42' (pen.); Roberto Alves 50'; Pepsi 58'; Omerovic (yellow card) 66'; Mahamid 86'	FCB report Report	Stocker (yellow card) 45'; Kasami 78'; Gonçalo Cardoso 82'	Stadium: St. Jakob-Park; Attendance: 0 Referee: (Switzerland) Léonce Lionel Tschudi
Note: COVID-19 pandemic in Switzerland

=== UEFA Europa League ===
17 September 2020 Second qualifying round	Osijek (Croatia)	1–2	(Switzerland) Basel	Stadion Gradski vrt, Osijek, Croatia
20:45	Žaper (yellow card) 69'; Silva (yellow card) 75'; Majstorović 84'; Bjelica (yellow card) 90+1'	FCB report UEFA summary	Cabral 18', (yellow card) 49'; Widmer (yellow card) 39'; Stocker 44', (yellow card) 90+1'; Padula (yellow card) 86'	Attendance: 0 Referee: José Luis Munuera Montero (Spain)

24 September 2020 Third qualifying round	Basel (Switzerland)	3–2	(Cyprus) Anorthosis	St. Jakob-Park, Basel
20:30	Widmer 4', (yellow card) 18'; Campo 12'; Hambardzumyan 21' (o.g.); Alderete (yellow card) 27'; Vonmoos (yellow card) 61' (yellow-red card) 88'; Padula (yellow card) 65'; Nikolić (yellow card) 86'	FCB report UEFA summary	Okriashvili (yellow card) 33' (yellow-red card) 50'; Vrgoč 45+1'; Kvilitaia 67' (pen.); Hambardzumyan (yellow card) 68'; Kvilitaia (yellow card) 84'	Attendance: 0 Referee: Radu Petrescu (Romania)

1 October 2020 Play-off round	Basel (Switzerland)	1–3	(Bulgaria) CSKA Sofia	St. Jakob-Park, Basel
20:30	Padula (yellow card) 49'; Cabral 54' (pen.); Alderte (yellow card) 87'; Cömert (yellow card) 90+5'	FCB report UEFA summary	Geferson (yellow card) 45'; Galabov (yellow card) 58'; Mazikou (yellow card) 66'; Rodrigues 72', 88'; Sankharé (yellow card) 75'; Youga (yellow card) 90+5'; Ahmedov 90+6'; Keita (yellow card) 90+7'	Attendance: 0 Referee: Ivan Kružliak (Slovakia)

== See also ==
- History of FC Basel
- List of FC Basel players
- List of FC Basel seasons

== Sources ==
- FCB squad 2020–21 at fcb-archiv.ch
- Switzerland 2020–21 at RSSSF
