= List of Swiss football transfers winter 2020–21 =

This is a list of Swiss football transfers for the 2020–21 winter transfer window. Only transfers featuring Swiss Super League are listed.

== Swiss Super League ==
Note: Flags indicate national team as has been defined under FIFA eligibility rules. Players may hold more than one non-FIFA nationality.

=== Young Boys ===
In:

No.	Pos.	Nation	Player

Out:

No.	Pos.	Nation	Player
14	DF	SUI	Nicolas Bürgy (on loan to (Germany) SC Paderborn 07)
27	DF	SUI	Léo Seydoux (to (Belgium) Westerlo)
77	FW	ALB	Taulant Seferi (on loan to (Albania) Tirana)
—	DF	SUI	Linus Obexer (to Vaduz, previously on loan)

=== St. Gallen ===
In:

No.	Pos.	Nation	Player
7	FW	AUT	Chukwubuike Adamu (on loan from (Austria) Salzburg)
15	DF	POR	Euclides Cabral (from Grasshoppers)

Out:

No.	Pos.	Nation	Player
7	FW	ALB	Florian Kamberi (on loan to (Scotland) Aberdeen)
11	FW	POR	André Ribeiro (to Grasshoppers)
14	MF	BRA	Fabiano Alves (free agent)
99	DF	SUI	Vincent Rüfli (on loan to Stade Lausanne Ouchy)

=== Basel ===
In:

No.	Pos.	Nation	Player
3	DF	POR	Gonçalo Cardoso (on loan from (England) West Ham)
6	MF	ALB	Amir Abrashi (on loan from (Germany) SC Freiburg)
19	FW	SUI	Darian Males (on loan from (Italy) Inter, previously on loan at (Italy) Genoa)
35	MF	ARG	Matías Palacios (from (Argentina) San Lorenzo)

Out:

No.	Pos.	Nation	Player
3	DF	GRE	Konstantinos Dimitriou (to (Hungary) Mezőkövesdi)
10	MF	SUI	Samuele Campo (on loan to (Germany) SV Darmstadt 98)
24	FW	SUI	Tician Tushi (on loan to Wil)
27	FW	SUI	Dimitri Oberlin (to (Germany) Bayern Munich II)
44	GK	SUI	Jozef Pukaj (on loan to Stade Lausanne Ouchy)

=== Servette ===
In:

No.	Pos.	Nation	Player
3	DF	FRA	Gaël Clichy (free agent)

Out:

No.	Pos.	Nation	Player
20	FW	KOS	Alban Ajdini (on loan to Stade Lausanne Ouchy)

=== Lugano ===
In:

No.	Pos.	Nation	Player
8	FW	SUI	Christopher Lungoyi (on loan from (Italy) Juventus)
13	DF	NGR	Lucky Opara (on loan from (Latvia) Spartaks Jūrmala)
17	FW	POR	Asumah Abubakar (from Kriens)
33	DF	SUI	Reto Ziegler (free agent)
18	FW	FRA	Kévin Monzialo (from (Italy) Juventus, previously on loan)

Out:

No.	Pos.	Nation	Player
8	FW	SUI	Christopher Lungoyi (to (Italy) Juventus)
9	FW	DEN	Jens Odgaard (loan return to (Italy) Sassuolo)
47	MF	GHA	Ransford Selasi (on loan to Kriens)
—	FW	ITA	Carlo Manicone (on loan to Chiasso, previously on loan at (Italy) Grosseto)

=== Luzern ===
In:

No.	Pos.	Nation	Player
3	MF	NED	Jordy Wehrmann (on loan from (Netherlands) Feyenoord)

Out:

No.	Pos.	Nation	Player
39	FW	KOS	Mark Marleku (on loan to Kriens)

=== Zürich ===
In:

No.	Pos.	Nation	Player
21	MF	SUI	Blerim Džemaili (free agent)

Out:

No.	Pos.	Nation	Player
17	DF	SLE	Umaru Bangura (to Xamax)
31	DF	KOS	Mirlind Kryeziu (on loan to Kriens)
43	MF	SUI	Henri Koide (on loan to Wil)
77	DF	CIV	Willie Britto (on loan to (Slovakia) Pohronie)

=== Sion ===
In:

No.	Pos.	Nation	Player
45	DF	SUI	Léo Lacroix (free agent)
52	DF	BRA	Wesley (on loan from (Italy) Juventus)
98	FW	SVK	Lubomír Tupta (on loan from (Italy) Hellas Verona, previously on loan at (Italy) Ascoli)

Out:

No.	Pos.	Nation	Player
2	DF	BRA	Raphael Branco (on loan to (Poland) Radomiak Radom)
23	DF	FRA	Alexandre Nsakala (on loan to (France) Haguenau)
25	FW	FRA	Yassin Fortuné (on loan to (France) Angers)
31	FW	BRA	Patrick Luan (on loan to Kriens)
40	FW	BRA	Itaitinga (on loan to (France) Pau)
64	MF	ANG	Edgar André (on loan to Xamax)

=== Lausanne ===
In:

No.	Pos.	Nation	Player
11	MF	CIV	Brahima Ouattara (on loan from (France) Nice)
12	FW	COD	Jonathan Bolingi (on loan from (Belgium) Antwerp, previously on loan at (Turkey) Ankaragücü)
20	FW	FRA	Hicham Mahou (on loan from (France) Nice)
28	MF	JPN	Toichi Suzuki (from (Japan) Shonan Bellmare)
50	GK	FRA	Melvin Mastil (on loan from Echallens)

Out:

No.	Pos.	Nation	Player
11	FW	BFA	Anthony Koura (on loan to Xamax)
19	MF	SUI	Christian Schneuwly (to Stade Lausanne Ouchy)
30	DF	SUI	Nicolas Gétaz (free agent)
—	FW	SUI	Simone Rapp (to (Romania) Sepsi OSK)

=== Vaduz ===
In:

No.	Pos.	Nation	Player
13	DF	SUI	Kevin Iodice (from Grasshoppers)
27	DF	SUI	Linus Obexer (from Young Boys, previously on loan)
37	FW	AUT	Elvin Ibrisimovic (from (Austria) Wacker Innsbruck)

Out:

No.	Pos.	Nation	Player
8	FW	MDA	Nicolae Milinceanu (to (Greece) PAS Giannina)
12	DF	SUI	Gianni Antoniazzi (on loan to Chiasso)
33	DF	LIE	Maximilian Göppel (free agent to Eschen/Mauren)

== See also ==
- 2020–21 Swiss Super League
