= List of Swiss football transfers winter 2019–20 =

This is a list of Swiss football transfers for the 2019–20 winter transfer window. Only transfers featuring Swiss Super League are listed.

== Swiss Super League ==
Note: Flags indicate national team as has been defined under FIFA eligibility rules. Players may hold more than one non-FIFA nationality.

=== Young Boys ===
In:

No.	Pos.	Nation	Player
25	DF	FRA	Jordan Lefort (on loan from (France) Amiens)

Out:

No.	Pos.	Nation	Player
17	FW	CIV	Roger Assalé (on loan to (Spain) Leganés)

=== Basel ===
In:

No.	Pos.	Nation	Player
21	DF	SUI	Jasper van der Werff (on loan from (Austria) Red Bull Salzburg)

Out:

No.	Pos.	Nation	Player
3	DF	GRE	Konstantinos Dimitriou (on loan to Wil)
11	FW	SUI	Noah Okafor (to (Austria) Red Bull Salzburg)
18	FW	SUI	Julian Vonmoos (on loan to Wil)
43	DF	SUI	Yves Kaiser (on loan to Schaffhausen)
—	MF	KOS	Gezim Pepsi (to Winterthur, previously on loan at Aarau)

=== Lugano ===
In:

No.	Pos.	Nation	Player
8	FW	SUI	Christopher Lungoyi (from (Portugal) Porto B)
47	MF	GHA	Ransford Selasi (on loan from (Italy) Juventus B)

Out:

No.	Pos.	Nation	Player
11	FW	BRA	Carlinhos (to (Japan) Shimizu S-Pulse)
13	GK	ITA	Alexander Muci (to (Italy) Latina)
17	MF	HUN	Bálint Vécsei (to (Hungary) Ferencváros)
23	FW	ITA	Nicola Dalmonte (loan return to (Italy) Genoa)
—	FW	ITA	Carlo Manicone (on loan to (Italy) Pianese, previously on loan at (Italy) Bisceglie)

=== Thun ===
In:

No.	Pos.	Nation	Player
16	MF	SUI	Leonardo Bertone (from (United States) Cincinnati)
27	FW	BFA	Hassane Bandé (on loan from (Netherlands) Ajax)
28	MF	LIE	Nicolas Hasler (from (United States) Sporting Kansas City)

Out:

No.	Pos.	Nation	Player
14	DF	SUI	Roy Gelmi (on loan to (Netherlands) Venlo)

=== Luzern ===
In:

No.	Pos.	Nation	Player
6	DF	SUI	Marco Bürki (from (Belgium) Zulte Waregem)

Out:

No.	Pos.	Nation	Player
3	DF	SRB	Lazar Ćirković (to (Israel) Maccabi Netanya)
21	MF	SUI	Remo Arnold (to Winterthur)

=== St. Gallen ===
In:

No.	Pos.	Nation	Player
24	FW	SUI	Lorenzo González (from (Spain) Málaga)
30	GK	GHA	Lawrence Ati-Zigi (from (France) Sochaux)

Out:

No.	Pos.	Nation	Player
1	GK	AUT	Dejan Stojanović (to (England) Middlesbrough)
6	MF	SUI	Alain Wiss (to (Austria) SCR Altach)
—	DF	SUI	Silvan Gönitzer (to Weesen, previously on loan at Schaffhausen)

=== Zürich ===
In:

No.	Pos.	Nation	Player
12	DF	DEN	Mads Pedersen (on loan from (Germany) FC Augsburg)

Out:

No.	Pos.	Nation	Player
6	MF	SLO	Denis Popović (to (Russia) Krylia Sovetov)
9	FW	GAM	Assan Ceesay (on loan to (Germany) VfL Osnabrück)
21	MF	SUI	Izer Aliu (on loan to Chiasso)
40	GK	AUT	Osman Hadžikić (on loan to (Croatia) Inter Zaprešić)
—	GK	CAN	Yann Fillion (to (Finland) Ekenäs, previously on loan at (Canada) Toronto FC II)

=== Sion ===
In:

No.	Pos.	Nation	Player
4	DF	SUI	Johan Djourou (free agent)
11	FW	SUI	Filip Stojilkovic (from Wil)
15	FW	JPN	Yamato Wakatsuki (on loan from (Japan) Shonan Bellmare)

Out:

No.	Pos.	Nation	Player
11	MF	SUI	Valon Behrami (to (Italy) Genoa)
—	MF	BRA	Adryan (on loan to (Brazil) Avaí, previously on loan at (Turkey) Kayserispor)
—	DF	SUI	Ivan Lurati (on loan to Bellinzona, previously on loan at Chiasso)
—	DF	BRA	Paulo Ricardo (to (Brazil) Figueirense, previously on loan at (Brazil) Goiás)
—	MF	ARG	Enzo Barrenechea (to (Italy) Juventus Primavera)

=== Neuchâtel Xamax ===
In:

No.	Pos.	Nation	Player
20	MF	SUI	Musa Araz (from (Turkey) Konyaspor)
26	MF	CIV	Serey Dié (from Aarau)
37	DF	FRA	Leroy Abanda (on loan from (Italy) Milan Primavera)
91	MF	ALG	Yannis Tafer (free agent)

Out:

No.	Pos.	Nation	Player
6	MF	SUI	Pietro Di Nardo (to Yverdon)
21	MF	KOS	Dilan Qela (on loan to Bavois)

=== Servette ===
In:

No.	Pos.	Nation	Player
16	FW	KOR	Park Jung-bin (free agent)

Out:

No.	Pos.	Nation	Player
22	FW	BRA	Mychell Chagas (released)
33	DF	SUI	Robin Busset (on loan to Kriens)

== See also ==
- 2019–20 Swiss Super League
