= Youth Campus Basel =

Sports club youth campus

The Stiftung Nachwuchs Campus Basel, in English foundation Youth Campus Basel, was established by Gigi Oeri in 2010. It was designed to foster the continuous development of FC Basel’s youth division. The foundation is officially registered with the Swiss company register. The foundation constructed and currently manages the campus facilities, oversees the renovation and operations of Wohnhuus, and provides support in the administration of the youth department. Its primary objective is to facilitate the comprehensive training and advancement of young football talents.

FC Basel's youth department has garnered acclaim for its success. Since the club's relocation to the newly constructed St. Jakob-Park in 2001, more than 40 youth players have progressed to the first team. Many of these players have subsequently transferred to prominent European clubs, exemplified by individuals such as Marco Streller, Philipp and David Degen, Ivan Rakitic, Xherdan Shaqiri, Granit Xhaka, Breel Embolo and Yann Sommer. Additionally, numerous current first-team members of FCB have emerged from Basel's youth teams, including Fabian Frei, Valentin Stocker, Eray Cömert, Raoul Petretta, Samuele Campo, Taulant Xhaka, Afimico Pululu, Jozef Pukaj, Tician Tushi, Felix Gebhardt, Orges Bunjaku and Albian Hajdari.

FC Basel's youth department comprises the following sections:

- Formation, which includes teams for U-21, U-19, U-18, U-17, U-16, and U-15 age groups.
- Préformation/Children’s Football, which consists of teams for FE14, FE13, FE12, E11, and E10 age categories.

== The foundation board ==
The board members include Gigi Oeri, Dr. Bruno Dallo, Jacques Herzog, and Benno Kaiser. Benno Kaiser initially served as the first managing director but has since resigned from the position. Following his departure, a new role, delegate of the foundation board, was established. Pascal Naef has held this position since October 2017 and currently serves as the acting managing director.

== Business management ==
In addition to Naef, the other members of the business management include Stefano Ceccaroni, who has been overseeing pedagogy, residential building, and nutrition since January 2017, and Danique Stein, who has been heading finances since October 2017, with responsibilities encompassing administration and events coordination.

== The foundation’s aim ==
The Foundation Youth Campus Basel was established in 2010 by the former FCB chairwoman, Gigi Oeri, with the objective of fostering sustainable youth football development in Basel. The foundation operates independently of party politics or ideology and maintains a charitable character, prioritizing non-profit goals. Its mission is to provide comprehensive training and advancement opportunities for young football talents, encompassing football skills, education, and personal development. To support the development of FCB's youth players, the foundation implements a dual training system, enabling players to pursue academic or vocational qualifications alongside their athletic training, thereby ensuring a holistic approach to their development.

== Campus ==
The campus was officially inaugurated in August 2013 following three years of planning and construction. It spans an area of 1,310 square meters and is situated at Campusweg 15 in Münchenstein. The outdoor space features four grass pitches and an artificial turf field. One of the grass fields is equipped with heating, allowing year-round operation of the youth campus. The main field measures 105x68 meters and includes a small grandstand with covered seating for up to 1,000 spectators. The synthetic turf field also measures 105x68 meters, while the remaining pitches are 100x64 meters. These grounds are utilized by all youth teams. Additionally, the campus comprises a building housing changing room facilities, a fitness room, a restaurant, a meeting room, and offices for staff and coaches.

== Wohnhuus ==
The Wohnhuus, or accommodation center, provides lodging for 18 players and ensures supervised accommodation and nutrition. Situated on Lehenmattstrasse in Basel, it is in close proximity to the St. Jakob sports complex, which includes swimming pools, an athletics track, playing fields, the campus, and the stadium. House number 336 offers assisted living for players aged 18 and above, with nine furnished apartments available. House 338 provides supervised living for up to 14 youngsters aged between 14 and 18.
