= Andrea Padula =

Swiss footballer (born 1996)

Personal information
- Full name: Andrea Rocco Padula
- Date of birth: 4 April 1996 (age 30)
- Place of birth: Mendrisio, Switzerland
- Height: 1.83 m (6 ft 0 in)
- Position: Left back

Team information
- Current team: UTA Arad
- Number: 72

Youth career
- AP Campionese
- –2014: Team Ticino
- 2014–2016: Lugano

Senior career*
Years	Team	Apps	(Gls)
2016–2018	Lugano	0	(0)
2016–2018	→ Chiasso (loan)	42	(2)
2018	→ Monza (loan)	2	(0)
2018–2020	Chiasso	44	(5)
2020	Wil	18	(4)
2020–2022	Basel	16	(0)
2022–2023	Bellinzona	5	(0)
2023–2025	FC U Craiova	51	(1)
2025–	UTA Arad	27	(1)
- * Club domestic league appearances and goals as of 11 September 2026

Andrea Rocco Padula (born 4 April 1996) is a professional footballer who plays as a left back for Liga I club UTA Arad.

== Club career ==
Andrea Padula started with his youth football playing for AP Campionese in the Italian enclave of Campione d'Italia. He joined FC Lugano and advanced through youth selection Team Ticino to the U-21 team before the 2014/15 season. By the end of the season, the then offensive player had made 20 appearances in the 1st division, the fourth-highest Swiss division, scoring six goals. However, the team were relegated to the fifth-rate 2nd league interregional. In 2015/16 Padula played 17 times in the fifth highest Swiss league, scoring six goals. In the 2016/17 season he was loaned out to second division club FC Chiasso. On 31 July 2016, the 2nd matchday, he made his debut in the second tier Challenge League in a 2–3 defeat against FC Schaffhausen, he was in the starting XI. He became a regular player for the team and played 31 games during that season scoring twice. In the following season he was again loaned to Chiasso for six months. During this period he played as left winger or more often as left back. During the winter break Padula was loaned out to A.C. Monza for six months. Padula made his professional debut with Monza in a 1-0 Serie C loss to Carrarese on 4 February 2018. Returning to Switzerland Padula transferred from Lugano to Chiassso permanently and played for them for 18 months. During the winter break of the 2019/20 season he transferred to FC Wil under head coach Ciriaco Sforza.

Sforza was hired as head coach by FC Basel for their 2020–21 season and on 11 September 2020 Padula followed Sforza and signed a contract with Basel. Padula played his debut for the club in the away game in the Europa League on 17 September 2020 at the Stadion Gradski vrt in Osijek, Croatia as Basel won 2–1 against NK Osijek to advance to the next round. He made his Swiss Super League debut for the club in the home game in the St. Jakob-Park three days later, on 20 September, as Basel played a 2–2 draw with Vaduz.

Sforza was sacked by Basel in April 2021 and Patrick Rahmen took over the job as head coach ad-interim for the rest of the season and he was then engaged by the club as head coach for the following 2021–22 season. Rahmen and Padula decided that they would part company and the contract was mutually dissolved. During his time with the club, Padula played a total of 28 games for Basel without scoring a goal. 16 of these games were in the Swiss Super League, four in the UEFA Europa League and eight were friendly games.

On 1 September 2022, Padula moved to Bellinzona.

On 3 July 2023, Padula moved to Romanian side FC U Craiova 1948. He signed a contract valid until the summer of next year, but it has an option to extend it for another edition.

On 7 July 2025, Padula signed a deal with UTA Arad.

== Personal life ==
Born in Switzerland, Padula is of Italian and Romanian descent. His mother is from Bucharest, Romania, and Padula said that he feels Romanian and his dream is to represent the Romanian national team.

== Career statistics ==
As of match played 11 September 2026

Appearances and goals by club, season and competition
Club	Season	League			National cup (Note: Includes Swiss Cup, Cupa României)		Europe		Other		Total	
Club	Season	Division	Apps	Goals	Apps	Goals	Apps	Goals	Apps	Goals	Apps	Goals
Chiasso	2016–17	Swiss Challenge League	31	2	3	2	—		—		34	4
Chiasso	2017–18	Swiss Challenge League	11	0	0	0	—		—		11	0
Chiasso	2018–19	Swiss Challenge League	31	5	2	1	—		—		33	6
Chiasso	2019–20	Swiss Challenge League	13	0	0	0	—		—		13	0
Chiasso	Total		86	7	5	3	—		—		91	10
Monza (loan)	2017–18	Serie C	2	0	0	0	—		1 (Note: Appearance in Serie C promotion play-offs)	0	3	0
Wil	2019–20	Swiss Challenge League	18	4	0	0	—		—		18	4
Basel	2020–21	Swiss Super League	14	0	0	0	3 (Note: Appearances in UEFA Europa League)	0	—		17	0
Basel	2022–23	Swiss Super League	2	0	0	0	1 (Note: Appearance in UEFA Conference League)	0	—		3	0
Basel	Total		16	0	0	0	4	0	—		20	0
Bellinzona	2022–23	Swiss Challenge League	5	0	1	0	—		—		6	0
FC U Craiova	2023–24	Liga I	27	0	3	1	—		—		30	1
FC U Craiova	2024–25	Liga II	24	1	1	0	—		—		25	1
FC U Craiova	Total		51	1	4	1	—		—		55	2
UTA Arad	2025–26	Liga I	20	0	1	0	—		—		21	0
UTA Arad	2026–27	Liga I	7	1	1	0	—		—		8	1
UTA Arad	Total		27	1	2	0	—		—		29	1
Career total			205	13	12	4	4	0	1	0	222	17
