= 2019–20 Under 20 Elite League =

European Elite League

Tournament details
- Dates: September 2019 – November 2019 (curtailed due to COVID-19 pandemic)
- Teams: 8 (from 8 associations)

Tournament statistics
- Matches played: 21
- Goals scored: 71 (3.38 per match)
- Top scorer(s): (Germany) Manuel Wintzheimer (Italy) Manolo Portanova (Netherlands) Jurgen Ekkelenkamp (Poland) Tomasz Makowski (Switzerland) Yannick Marchand (3 goals each)

The 2019–20 Under 20 Elite League is an age-restricted association football tournament for national Under-20 teams. It was the third edition of the Under 20 Elite League but was ultimately curtailed after the 5th round of games in November 2019 due to the COVID-19 pandemic.

== Participating teams ==
- Czech Republic
- England
- Germany
- Italy
- Netherlands
- Poland
- Portugal
- Switzerland

== League table ==
Pos	Team	Pld	W	D	L	GF	GA	GD	Pts
1	Italy	5	4	1	0	14	7	+7	13
2	Germany	5	4	0	1	12	7	+5	12
3	England	5	2	2	1	7	5	+2	8
4	Czech Republic	5	2	1	2	10	8	+2	7
5	Poland	5	2	0	3	10	9	+1	6
6	Netherlands	5	1	2	2	5	8	−3	5
7	Portugal	6	1	2	3	7	13	−6	5
8	Switzerland	6	0	2	4	6	14	−8	2

Source: Flashscore

== Results ==
5 September 2019

Germany	4–2	Czech Republic
Wintzheimer 23'; Otto 71', 83'; Krüger 73'	Report	Šulc 66'; Šípek 77'

5 September 2019

Italy	2–0	Poland
Capone 43'; Raspadori 55'	Report

5 September 2019

Portugal	2–2	Switzerland
Camacho 56'; Dantas 58'	Report	Rustemoski 48'; Marchand 52'

Referee: Sven Waschitzki (Germany)

5 September 2019

England	0–0	Netherlands
	Report

New Meadow, Shrewsbury (England)
Attendance: 2,578

8 September 2019

Netherlands	1–2	Germany
Van de Looi 25'	Report	Amade 61'; Kühn 73'

9 September 2019

Poland	0–1	Portugal
	Report	Costa 57'

Referee: Darren England (England)

9 September 2019

Czech Republic	0–2	Italy
	Report	Gaetano 76'; Olivieri 86'

9 September 2019

Switzerland	0–1	England
	Report	Clarke 90+2'

Stadion Schützenmatte, Basel (Switzerland)
Attendance: 1,000

10 October 2019

Italy	2–2	England
Frabotta 39'; Portanova 49'	Report	Gomes 23' (pen.), 24'

Stadio Ennio Tardini, Parma (Italy)

10 October 2019

Switzerland	1–1	Czech Republic
Haile-Selassie 56'	Report	Fortelný 33'

10 October 2019

Germany	3–4	Poland
Wintzheimer 7' (pen.), 21'; Yeboah 36'	Report	Makowski 1'; Zylla 41'; Kurminowski 47'; Poręba 90'

10 October 2019

Netherlands	1–1	Portugal
Ekkelenkamp 43'	Report	Vieira 69'

Referee: Gianpaolo Calvarese (Italy)

13 October 2019

Switzerland	0–1	Germany
	Report	Yeboah 73'

14 October 2019

Poland	1–2	Netherlands
Makowski 52'	Report	Aboukhlal 14'; Ekkelenkamp 36'

14 October 2019

England	0–3	Czech Republic
	Report	Hellebrand 51', 60'; Hušek 74'

London Road Stadium, Peterborough (England)
Attendance: 6,296

15 October 2019

Portugal	3–4	Italy
Rodrigues 46'; Viera 58'; Mário 63'	Report	Anderson 13'; Portanova 24'; Olivieri 42'; Gori 74'

Referee: Patrick Alt (Germany)

14 November 2019

Portugal	0–4	England
	Report	Campbell 10' (16); Poveda 25'; Smith Rowe 61'

Estádio Municipal de Águeda, Águeda (Portugal)
Referee: Piero Giacomelli (Italy)

14 November 2019

Poland	5–1	Switzerland
	Report

15 November 2019

Netherlands	1–4	Czech Republic
	Report

18 November 2019

Italy	4–2	Switzerland
	Report

18 November 2019

Portugal	0–2	Germany
	Report

Estádio Municipal de Águeda, Águeda (Portugal)
Referee: Pawel Pskit (Poland)
