= Gonçalo Cardoso (footballer, born 2000) =

Portuguese footballer

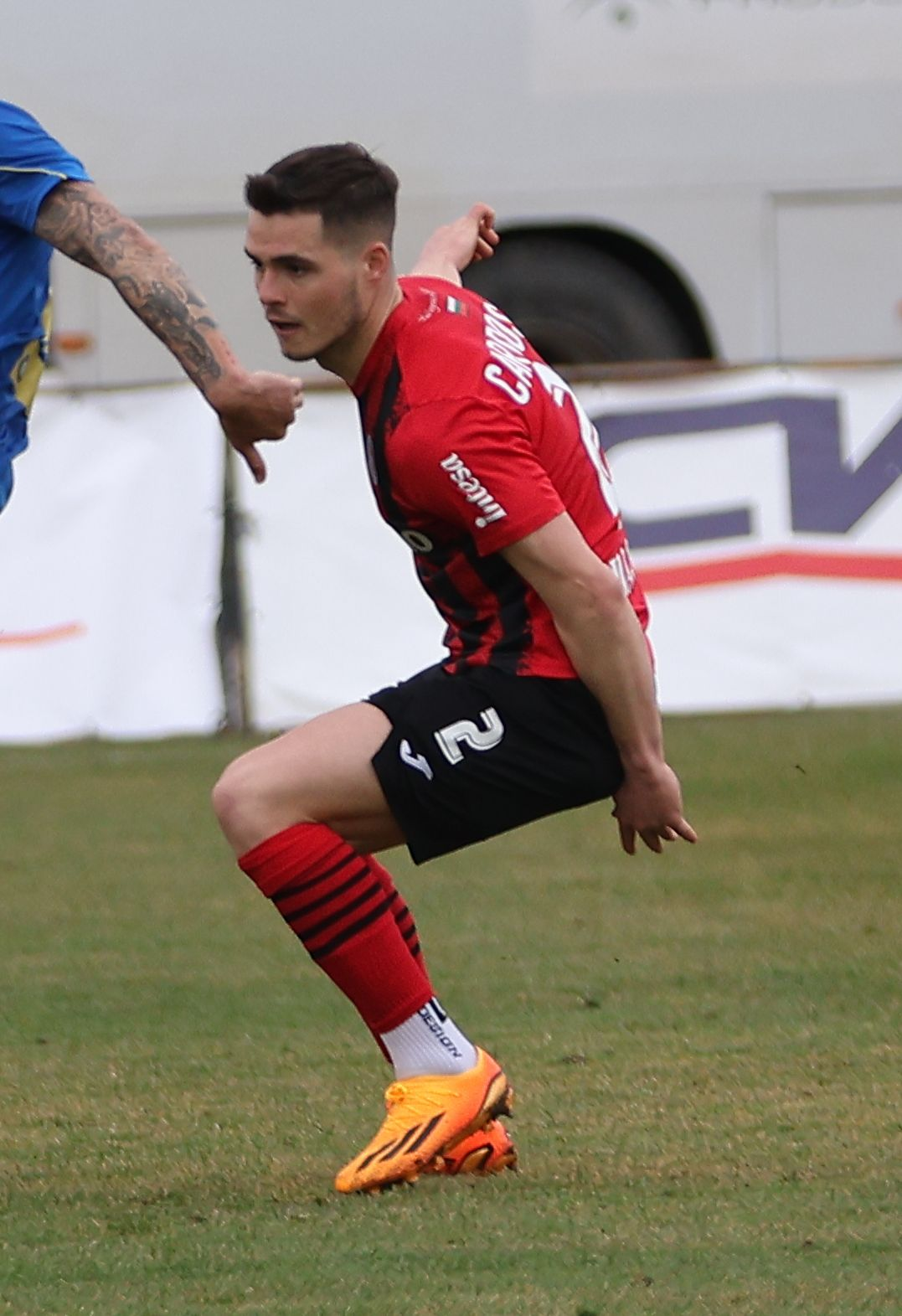

Personal information
- Full name: Gonçalo Bento Soares Cardoso
- Date of birth: 21 October 2000 (age 26)
- Place of birth: Marco de Canaveses, Portugal
- Height: 1.89 m (6 ft 2 in)
- Position: Centre-back

Team information
- Current team: Mafra
- Number: 5

Youth career
- 2009–2012: AD Marco 09
- 2012–2017: Penafiel
- 2017–2018: Boavista

Senior career*
Years	Team	Apps	(Gls)
2018–2019	Boavista	15	(0)
2019–2022	West Ham United	0	(0)
2021–2022	→ Basel (loan)	5	(0)
2022	→ Real Betis B (loan)	16	(1)
2022–2023	Marítimo	0	(0)
2023	Marítimo B	2	(0)
2023–2024	Lokomotiv Sofia	18	(1)
2024–2026	Paços de Ferreira	23	(0)
2026–	Mafra	5	(0)

International career
2018–2019	Portugal U19	9	(3)
2019	Portugal U20	5	(0)
- * Club domestic league appearances and goals as of 12 September 2026

Gonçalo Bento Soares Cardoso (born 21 October 2000) is a Portuguese professional footballer who plays as a centre-back for Liga 3 club Mafra.

== Club career ==
=== Boavista ===
On 7 October 2018, Cardoso made his professional debut with Boavista in a 2018–19 Primeira Liga match against Desportivo das Aves, starting in the 1–0 home win. He was the second youngest player ever to play for the club, surpassing club legends such as Nuno Gomes and João Vieira Pinto.

=== West Ham United ===
In August 2019, he joined West Ham United on a five-year contract for an undisclosed fee. During the 2019–20 and 2020–21 seasons, Cardoso only featured for the U23s at West Ham playing regularly in the Premier League 2 and three appearances in the EFL Trophy.

=== Basel ===
On 30 January 2021, Cardoso signed for Swiss Super League side FC Basel on an 18-month loan deal with an option to buy. Basel confirmed the loan on the same day and Cardoso joined Basel's first team for the second half of their 2020–21 season under head coach Ciriaco Sforza. He played his domestic league debut for the club in the away game in the Letzigrund on 14 February 2021 as Basel were defeated 2–0 by Zürich. He scored his first goal for the club just three days later on 17 February in the Swiss Cup game in the St. Jakob Stadium as Basel were beaten 6–2 by Winterthur. During a training in March Cardoso injured himself and could not play for the rest of the season.

At the beginning of the following season he played in five test games and made an 90 minute appearance in a Swiss Cup match. However the injury re-occurred and the loan contract was dissolved a few months later. During his short period with the club, Cardoso played a total of 13 games for Basel scoring the afore mentioned one goal. Five of these games were in the Swiss Super League, two in the Swiss Cup and six were friendly games.

=== Real Betis ===
On 20 January 2022, Cardoso moved on a new loan to Real Betis in Spain and was assigned to the B-team.

=== Marítimo ===
On 1 September 2022, Cardoso returned to Portugal to sign for C.S. Marítimo.

=== Lokomotiv Sofia ===
On 29 September 2023, Cardoso signed for Bulgarian First League club Lokomotiv Sofia.

== International career ==
On 17 November 2018, Cardoso made his Portugal U19 debut in an international friendly against Armenia U19. He also helped his side get the final of the 2019 UEFA European Under-19 Championship scoring in Portugal's opening group stage fixture against Italy, and while he played in every minute of the campaign for his side, they eventually lost to Spain in the final.

Cardoso also made five appearances for Portugal U20 in the 2019–20 Under 20 Elite League before it was eventually cancelled due to the COVID-19 pandemic.

== Career statistics ==
As of match played 16 August 2021

Appearances and goals by club, season and competition
Club	Season	League			National cup		League cup		Europe		Total	
Club	Season	Division	Apps	Goals	Apps	Goals	Apps	Goals	Apps	Goals	Apps	Goals
Boavista	2018–19	Primeira Liga	15	0	3	0	0	0	—		18	0
West Ham United	2019–20	Premier League	0	0	0	0	0	0	—		0	0
West Ham United	2020–21	Premier League	0	0	0	0	0	0	—		0	0
West Ham United	Total		0	0	0	0	0	0	0	0	0	0
Basel (loan)	2020–21	Swiss Super League	3	0	1	1	—		0	0	4	1
Basel (loan)	2021–22	Swiss Super League	0	0	1	0	0	0	0	0	1	0
Basel (loan)	Total		3	0	2	1	0	0	0	0	5	1
Career total			18	0	5	1	0	0	0	0	23	1
