= Pajtim Kasami =

Swiss footballer (born 1992)

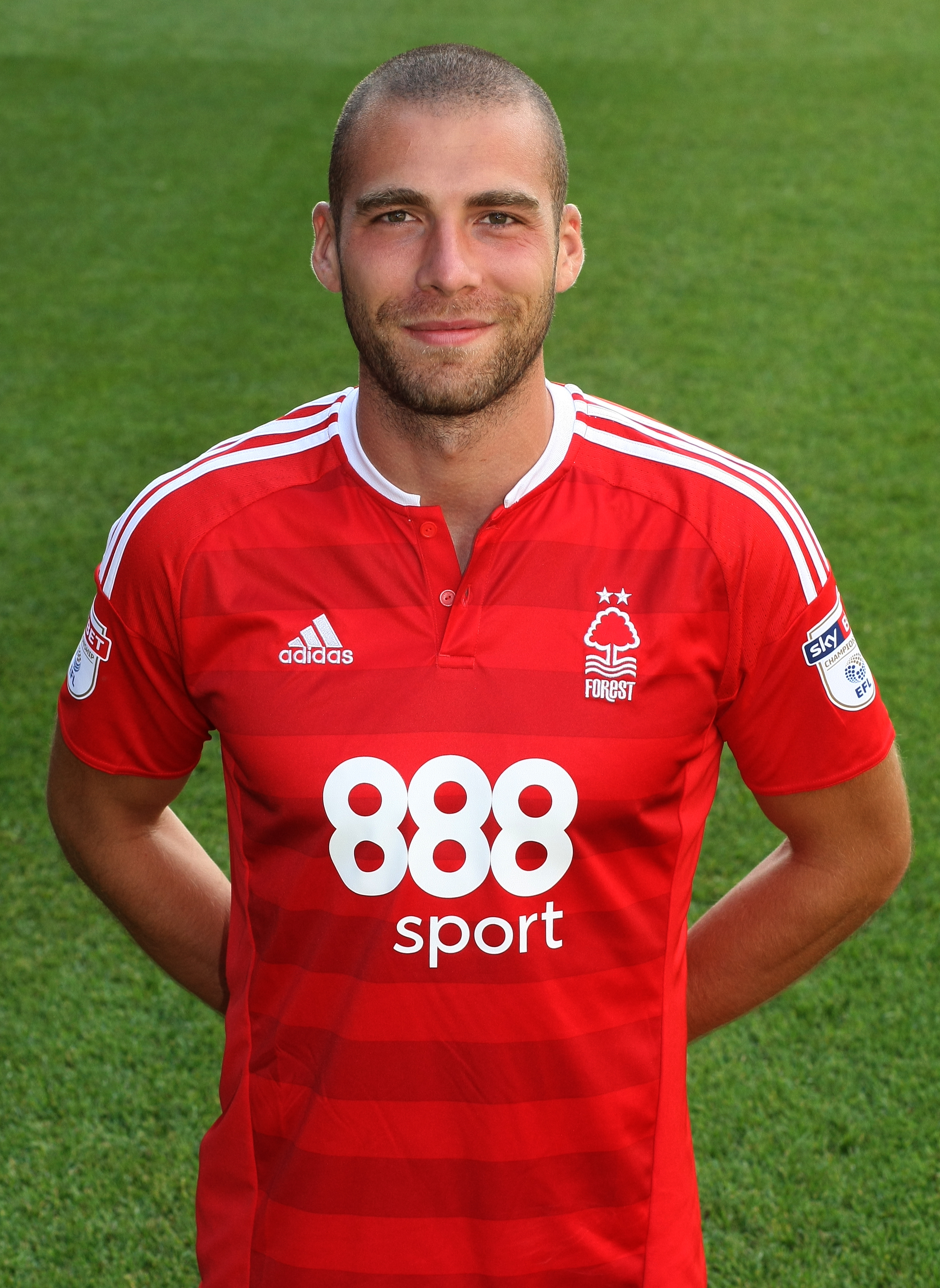
- Kasami with Nottingham Forest in 2016

Personal information
- Full name: Pajtim Kasami
- Date of birth: 2 June 1992 (age 34)
- Place of birth: Andelfingen, Switzerland
- Height: 1.88 m (6 ft 2 in)
- Position: Midfielder

Youth career
- 2003–2006: Winterthur
- 2006–2009: Grasshopper
- 2008: → Liverpool (loan)
- 2009: Lazio

Senior career*
Years	Team	Apps	(Gls)
2010	Bellinzona	10	(2)
2010–2011	Palermo	14	(0)
2011–2014	Fulham	38	(3)
2013	→ Luzern (loan)	16	(1)
2014–2017	Olympiacos	44	(6)
2016–2017	→ Nottingham Forest (loan)	25	(2)
2017–2020	Sion	95	(25)
2020–2022	Basel	65	(16)
2022–2023	Olympiacos	12	(2)
2023–2025	Sampdoria	37	(6)
2025	Sion	9	(0)
2025–2026	Winterthur	24	(5)

International career
2007	Switzerland U15	3	(1)
2007	Switzerland U16	4	(0)
2009	Switzerland U17	9	(3)
2009	Switzerland U18	3	(2)
2010–2014	Switzerland U21	30	(6)
2012	Switzerland Olympic	3	(0)
2013–2016	Switzerland	12	(2)
Medal record
Switzerland
FIFA U-17 World Cup
Winner	2009 Nigeria
UEFA European Under-21 Championship
Runner-up	2011 Denmark
- * Club domestic league appearances and goals as of 26 May 2026

Pajtim Kasami (born 2 June 1992) is a Swiss professional footballer who plays as a midfielder.

== Early career ==
Born in Zürich, Switzerland to an ethnic Albanian family from Struga, North Macedonia, Kasami started his career in 2003 with Swiss club Winterthur before he joined Grasshoppers in Zürich in 2006. In the same year, he also briefly played for Liverpool on loan. On 2 February 2009, at age 16, he moved to Lazio in the Italian Serie A. At the start of the 2009–10 season, Kasami was reported absent without leave and was due to play for the reserves that season.

== Club career ==
=== Bellinzona ===
In December 2009, Kasami returned to Switzerland to play for Bellinzona, signing a contract until 2011. He made his professional debut in March after his free transfer was cleared by Swiss Football Association. Lazio terminated his contract after Kasami failed to appear on several training sessions in the youth teams or first team, and it was due to his indiscipline that Lazio did not want to buy his rights from Grasshopper.

=== Palermo ===
On 7 June 2010, Palermo announced they had signed the midfielder in a five-year contract from Bellinzona. Despite his young age, he was immediately included in the first team and made his debut with a rosanero jersey as a second-half substitute in the first leg of the 2010–11 UEFA Europa League play-off against Maribor. He then made his Serie A debut later on 30 August, playing the entire home league game against Cagliari, which ended in a 0–0 draw. He concluded the season with 24 appearances: 14 in the league, 8 in Europa League and 2 in Coppa Italia. Zamparini hailed Kasami as "the new Pastore".

=== Fulham ===
On 25 July 2011, Kasami signed for Fulham on a four-year deal for an undisclosed fee. He made his début for Fulham as a late substitute in the 0–0 draw in their Europa League clash with RNK Split. He was later in the starting line-up versus Dnipro on 18 August 2011, playing for 88 minutes and was greatly involved in the set up of all the 3 goals. Kasami made his Premier League début on 21 August 2011 against Wolverhampton Wanderers at the Molineux Stadium. Fulham lost the match 2–0.

Kasami almost joined Pescara on loan on 1 January 2013, but the move could not be finalised in time due to a bad internet connection. Kasami joined Luzern on loan until the end of the 2012–13 season on 15 February 2013. He made his debut in the 4–0 away defeat to St. Gallen on 24 February 2013. He scored his first goal for Luzern in the 4–3 away victory over Servette FC in the final game of the 2012–13 season on 1 June 2013. Following his loan spell with Luzern came to an end, Manager Martin Jol revealed Kasami took a fifty per cent cut of his wage to stay at the club. He scored Fulham's first goal of the 2013–14 Premier League season in a 1–0 away victory against Sunderland. Kasami then scored his second goal of the season against Crystal Palace on 21 October; a dipping volley from the edge of the area, in a match that eventually ended a 4–1 away win to Fulham. This goal was nominated for the FIFA Puskás Award for the best goal of the year, the only one nominated from the Premier League. A third was added with a deflected free kick in a 2–1 win at Norwich on 26 December 2013.

=== Olympiacos ===
It was announced on 9 July 2014 that Kasami had signed for Olympiacos for a fee of €5 million. On 23 August 2014, he netted his first goal in his official debut as a player of Olympiacos in a 3–1 home win against Niki Volos. He scored again on 30 August 2014 against Panetolikos in a 1–1 away draw.

On 22 October 2014, Olympiacos pulled off one of the surprises of the Champions League night when they beat Juventus 1–0 in Piraeus with a first-half goal from Kasami. On 22 February 2015, Kasami experienced one of the most traumatic shocks in his life after the derby against Panathinaikos. On 11 March 2015, Olympiakos's Portuguese coach Vitor Pereira and Kasami were fined for their behavior after the team's Greek Cup quarter-final 1–0 win over AEK Athens. The disciplinary committee of the Greek soccer federation fined Pereira €9,000 and Kasami was ordered to pay €7,000 for making gestures to the crowd which incited trouble.

After a successful 2014–15, which ended with double conquest, several reports in Italy are keep insisting that Kasami was likely to move to a Serie A club and it is believed that Fiorentina or Inter were the most favourable destination. Despite serious interest from Fiorentina, Bayer Leverkusen and lately from Roma, Kasami did not complete his transfer on the deadline day. He scored his first goal for the 2015–16 season in a hammering 5–1 win against PAS Giannina.

On 2 October 2015, media source stated that Olympiacos' former manager Vitor Pereira and midfielder Kasami were prosecuted for provoking episodes in the Greek Cup semi final against AEK Athens. The Deputy Prosecutor Giorgos Lainis prosecuted Kasami and Vitor Pereira. Αt the same time, the Football prosecutor former Sports Prosecutor Konstantinos Simitzglou had begun preliminary examination by calling witnesses in order to combine his case with the prosecution. The two men were close to facing criminal responsibilities and even go to trial. On 9 June 2017, Kasami was sentenced to eight months in prison (on parole) for their behavior. The Swiss-Albanian international central midfielder were punished by the Greek Justice for offensively provoking the supporters of AEK after the end of 2014–15 Greek Cup quarter final (0–1) between the two teams in the Olympic Stadium of Athens, after the lawsuit filed by the fan of home side, Christos Garifallou, and supported by their legal department.

=== Nottingham Forest ===
On 3 August 2016, Kasami became Nottingham Forest's seventh signing of the summer when he joined the reds on a twelve-month loan deal from Olympiacos. On 27 August 2016, he scored his first goal for the club in a 3–1 home win against Leeds United. According to English sources, Kasami had expressed his wish to return to Olympiacos in January transfer window. The former Fulham star failed to hit the heights that were expected of him when brought to Nottingham by French manager Philippe Montanier, who had since been sacked. On 14 February 2017, Kasami's half-volley gave Forest an early lead in a 3–2 away loss against Fulham On 5 May 2017, Nottingham Forest announced that Kasami had returned to Olympiacos.

=== Sion ===
On 31 August 2017, Kasami signed a three-year contract with Swiss club FC Sion for an undisclosed fee. During the 2018–19 season Kasami scored eight goals and made three assists in 20 appearances for Sion and as a result became the subject of transfer interest from Crystal Palace and Turkish club Fenerbahçe as well as fellow Swiss team FC Basel.

On 20 March 2020, FC Sion's president Christian Constantin terminated the contracts of all players without notice after they failed to agree to an 80% salary pay cut during coronavirus pandemic. Players such as Pajtim Kasami, Johan Djourou and Alex Song among others, wished to secure themselves legally with lawyers before agreeing to sign.

=== Basel ===
According to various news, Italian Serie A club Venezia F.C. had officially moved for the acquisition of the Swiss ex-international Kasami, however, the move never came into fruition. On 12 October 2020, FC Basel announced that Kasami joined them on a two-year deal. Kasami joined Basel's first team for their 2020–21 season under head coach Ciriaco Sforza. After playing in one test game Kasami played his domestic league debut for his new club in the away game in the Kybunpark on 1 November 2020. He scored his first goal for the team in the same game, it was the last goal in the game, as Basel won 3–1 against St. Gallen. He immediately became a regular starter, playing 32 games, scoring 12 in his first season. At the beginning of his second season with the club he was also regular starter under new head coach Patrick Rahmen, but then after the winter break and following the change of trainer to Guillermo Abascal, Kasami was used mainly as substitute. Kasami left Basel after his contract expired. During his period with the club Kasaim played a total of 92 games for Basel scoring a total of 23 goals. 65 of these games were in the Swiss Super League, 1 in the Swiss Cup, 13 in the UEFA Europa Conference League and 13 were friendly games. He scored 16 goals in the domestic league, 2 in the Conference League and the other 4 were scored during the test games.

=== Sampdoria ===
On 14 September 2023, Kasami signed a contract with Sampdoria in Italy for one season. Kasami left Sampdoria by mutual consent on 3 February 2025.

=== Return to Sion ===
On 11 February 2025, FC Sion announced Kasami's return until summer 2026. His contract with Sion was terminated by mutual consent on 2 July 2025. In this half year, he made just nine appearances off the bench, totalling 112 minutes played.

== International career ==
Kasami was part of the Swiss under-17 team that won the 2009 World Cup. Whilst at Bellinzona, he earned a call-up to the Switzerland U21 team along with teammates Alessandro Ciarrocchi and Frank Feltscher, making his debut against Georgia U21 on 30 May 2010. Kasami was selected to represent Switzerland in the men's football tournament at the 2012 Summer Olympics as part of the Swiss under-23 team. He played over 90 minutes in all three games in the tournament, but the team were knocked out, finishing in fourth position of their Group. He made his debut for the Swiss senior team in a 1–0 win against Slovenia on 15 October 2013 and scored his first goal on 15 November 2013 in a friendly 2–1 defeat against South Korea. He scored his first competitive goal against San Marino to put Switzerland up 5–0 in an eventual 7–0 win.

== Career statistics ==
=== Club ===
As of 2 July 2025

Appearances and goals by club, season and competition
Club	Season	League			National cup		League cup		Europe		Other		Total	
Club	Season	Division	Apps	Goals	Apps	Goals	Apps	Goals	Apps	Goals	Apps	Goals	Apps	Goals
Bellinzona	2009–10	Challenge League	10	2	0	0	—		—		2	0	12	2
Palermo	2010–11	Serie A	14	0	2	0	—		8	0	—		24	0
Fulham	2011–12	Premier League	7	0	1	0	1	0	9	0	—		18	0
Fulham	2012–13	Premier League	2	0	0	0	1	0	—		—		3	0
Fulham	2013–14	Premier League	29	3	4	0	2	0	—		—		35	3
Fulham	Total		38	3	5	0	4	0	9	0	—		56	3
Luzern (loan)	2012–13	Swiss Super League	16	1	—		—		—		—		16	1
Olympiacos	2014–15	Super League Greece	24	4	3	0	—		8	1	—		35	5
Olympiacos	2015–16	Super League Greece	20	2	4	2	—		7	0	—		31	4
Olympiacos	Total		44	6	7	2	—		15	1	—		66	9
Nottingham Forest (loan)	2016–17	Championship	25	2	0	0	2	0	—		—		27	2
Sion	2017–18	Swiss Super League	26	6	1	0	—		—		—		27	6
Sion	2018–19	Swiss Super League	34	8	3	2	—		—		—		37	10
Sion	2019–20	Swiss Super League	35	11	3	2	—		—		—		38	13
Sion	Total		95	25	7	4	—		—		—		102	29
Basel	2020–21	Swiss Super League	32	12	1	1	—		—		—		33	13
Basel	2021–22	Swiss Super League	33	4	0	0	—		13	2	—		45	6
Basel	Total		65	16	1	1	—		13	2	—		79	19
Olympiacos	2022–23	Super League Greece	12	2	3	0	—		0	0	—		15	2
Sampdoria	2023–24	Serie B	27	5	1	0	—		—		1	0	29	5
Sampdoria	2024–25	Serie B	10	1	0	0	—		—		—		10	1
Sampdoria	Total		37	6	1	0	—		—		—		39	6
Sion	2024–25	Swiss Super League	9	0	0	0	—		—		—		9	0
Career total			365	63	26	7	6	0	45	3	3	0	445	73

=== International ===
As of 29 March 2016

Appearances and goals by national team and year
National team	Year	Apps	Goals
Switzerland	2013	2	1
Switzerland	2014	3	0
Switzerland	2015	5	1
Switzerland	2016	2	2
Total		12	2

Scores and results list Switzerland's goal tally first, score column indicates score after each Kasami goal.

List of international goals scored by Pajtim Kasami
No.	Date	Venue	Opponent	Score	Result	Competition
1	15 November 2013	Seoul World Cup Stadium, Seoul, South Korea	South Korea	1–0	1–2	Friendly
2	9 October 2015	AFG Arena, St. Gallen, Switzerland	San Marino	5–0	7–0	UEFA Euro 2016 qualification

== Honours ==
Palermo

- Coppa Italia runner-up: 2010–11

Olympiacos

- Super League Greece: 2014–15, 2015–16
- Greek Cup: 2014–15;

Switzerland U17

- FIFA U-17 World Cup: 2009

Switzerland U21

- UEFA European Under-21 Championship runner-up: 2011
