= 2022–23 AC Bellinzona season =

AC Bellinzona
2022–23 season
- Chairman: Paolo Righetti
- Manager: David Sesa (until 22 August); Fernando Cocimano (interim, from 22 August until 14 September); Baldo Raineri (from 14 September)
- Stadium: Stadio Comunale Bellinzona
- Swiss Challenge League: 6th
- Swiss Cup: Round 2

The 2022–23 season is the 111th season in the history of AC Bellinzona and their first season back in the second division of Swiss football since 2013. The club are participating in Swiss Challenge League and the Swiss Cup. The season covers the period from 1 July 2022 to 30 June 2023.

== Players ==
As of 7 August 2022

Note: Flags indicate national team as defined under FIFA eligibility rules; some limited exceptions apply. Players may hold more than one non-FIFA nationality.

No.	Pos.	Nation	Player
1	GK	SUI	Yuri-Gino Klein
6	MF	SUI	Guélor Samba
7	MF	URU	Cristian Souza
10	FW	URU	Sergio Cortelezzi
11	MF	SUI	Matteo Tosetti
12	GK	SUI	Alexander Muci (on loan from Lugano)
13	DF	URU	Guillermo Padula
15	DF	SUI	Serkan Izmirlioglu (on loan from Luzern)
17	DF	SUI	Bruno Morgado
18	FW	POR	André Ribeiro

No.	Pos.	Nation	Player
19	FW	SUI	Tresor Samba
23	DF	ARG	Isaac Monti
27	MF	CIV	Eric Tia
28	DF	SUI	Gaetano Berardi
33	MF	TUR	Mehmet Manis
47	DF	SUI	Santiago Miranda
77	GK	COD	Joël Kiassumbua
88	MF	ITA	Tommaso Centinaro
99	FW	URU	Rodrigo Pollero

== Pre-season and friendlies ==
Win Draw Loss Fixtures

10 July 2022 Friendly	Bellinzona (Switzerland)	0–0	(Italy) Monza	Bellinzona
18:00 CEST (UTC+2)				Stadium: Stadio Comunale Bellinzona

17 August 2022 Friendly	Bellinzona (Switzerland)	2–1	(Switzerland) Team Ticino	Bellinzona
17:30 CEST (UTC+2)				Stadium: Stadio Comunale Bellinzona

10 January 2023 Friendly	Thun (Switzerland)	0–1	(Switzerland) Bellinzona	Thun, Switzerland
14:30 CET (UTC+1)				Stadium: Stockhorn Arena

== Competitions ==
=== Overall record ===
Competition	First match	Last match	Starting round	Final position	Record							
Competition	First match	Last match	Starting round	Final position	Pld	W	D	L	GF	GA	GD	Win %
Swiss Challenge League	16 July 2022	May 2023	Matchday 1		18	7	2	9	24	34	−10	38.89
Swiss Cup	21 August 2022	17 September 2022	Round 1	Round 2	2	1	0	1	4	2	+2	50.00
Total					20	8	2	10	28	36	−8	40.00

Last updated: 25 November 2022
Source: Soccerway

=== Swiss Challenge League ===
==== League table ====
Pos	Team	Pld	W	D	L	GF	GA	GD	Pts	Promotion or qualification
6	Thun	36	12	13	11	62	55	+7	49	
7	Schaffhausen	36	12	8	16	51	59	−8	44	
8	Vaduz	36	7	16	13	54	56	−2	37	Qualification for the Europa Conference League first qualifying round (Note: Vaduz qualified for the Europa Conference League first qualifying round by winning the 2022–23 Liechtenstein Cup.)
9	Bellinzona	36	11	4	21	38	71	−33	37	
10	Xamax (O)	36	4	12	20	42	65	−23	24	Qualification for the relegation play-off

Source: Swiss Challenge League
Rules for classification: 1) Points; 2) Goal difference; 3) Goals scored; 4) Head-to-head goal difference; 5) Away goals scored; 6) Draw.
(O) Play-off winners

==== Results summary ====
Overall								Home						Away					
Pld	W	D	L	GF	GA	GD	Pts	W	D	L	GF	GA	GD	W	D	L	GF	GA	GD
5	2	1	2	6	11	−5	7	1	0	2	2	8	−6	1	1	0	4	3	+1

Last updated: 17 August 2022.
Source: Swiss Challenge League

==== Results by round ====
Round	1	2	3	4	5	6
Ground	H	A	H	A	H	H
Result	W	D	L	W	L	
Position						

Updated to match(es) played on 17 August 2022. Source: Swiss Challenge League
A = Away; H = Home; W = Win; D = Draw; L = Loss

==== Matches ====
The league fixtures were announced on 17 June 2022.

=== Swiss Cup ===
21 August 2022 Round 1	FC Widnau	1–4	Bellinzona	Widnau
14:00 CEST (UTC+2)		Report		Stadium: Aegeten

16–18 September 2022 Round 2	Bellinzona	v	Luzern	Lausanne
--:-- CEST (UTC+2)				Stadium: Stade de la Tuilière
