= Orges Bunjaku =

Swiss footballer (born 2001)

Personal information
- Date of birth: 5 July 2001 (age 25)
- Place of birth: Uznach, Switzerland
- Height: 1.80 m (5 ft 11 in)
- Position: Midfielder

Team information
- Current team: Wil
- Number: 8

Youth career
- 2007–2015: Rapperswil-Jona
- 2015–2019: Basel

Senior career*
Years	Team	Apps	(Gls)
2019–2021	Basel U21	19	(1)
2020–2021	Basel	12	(0)
2021–2023	Grenoble	17	(0)
2023	→ Schaffhausen (loan)	10	(1)
2023–2025	Schaffhausen	53	(4)
2025–	Wil	32	(1)

International career^{‡}
2016	Switzerland U15	3	(0)
2016–2017	Switzerland U16	3	(0)
2017	Switzerland U17	6	(1)
2018	Switzerland U18	2	(0)
2019	Switzerland U19	5	(3)
2020	Switzerland U20	1	(0)
- * Club domestic league appearances and goals as of 30 September 2026 ‡ National team caps and goals as of 7 October 2020

Orges Naser Bunjaku (born 5 July 2001) is a professional footballer who plays as a midfielder for Wil. Born in Switzerland, he represented that nation at youth international levels but in 2022 switched to play for Kosovo national team.

== Club career ==
=== Early career and Basel ===
Bunjaku at the age of six started playing football in local club Rapperswil-Jona. In 2015, he transferred to the youth system of Basel. In January 2020, he advanced to their first team and signed his first professional contract with the club, agreeing on a four-year deal.

After playing in two test games, Bunjaku played his domestic league debut for the club in the away game on 8 February 2020 as Basel won 4–0 against Zürich. He played five league games in his first season, three times he played in the starting formation. He also had one appearance in the UEFA Europa League as he was substituted in during 84th minute in the match against APOEL.

=== Grenoble ===
On 19 July 2021, Bunjaku signed a three-year contract with Ligue 2 club Grenoble and received squad number 25. Five days later, he made his debut in a 0–4 home defeat against Paris FC after coming on as a substitute at 46th minute in place of Yannick Marchand.

=== Schaffhausen ===
==== Period on loan ====
On 2 January 2023, Bunjaku joined Swiss Challenge League side Schaffhausen, on a loan until the end of the season. His debut with Schaffhausen came on 29 January in a 1–1 away draw against Neuchâtel Xamax after coming on as a substitute in the 64th minute in place of Harun Alpsoy.

==== Return as a permanent player ====
On 30 June 2023, Schaffhausen made the transfer permanent and signed a two-year contract with Bunjaku. His debut with Schaffhausen came on 21 July in a 3–0 away defeat against Neuchâtel Xamax after being named in the starting line-up. One month after debut, Bunjaku scored his first goal for Schaffhausen in his fourth appearance for the club in a 3–1 away win over Cham in Swiss Cup.

== International career ==
=== Youth ===
From 2016, until 2020, Bunjaku has been part of Switzerland at youth international level, respectively has been part of the U15, U16, U17, U18, U19 and U20 teams and he with these teams played twenty matches and scored four goals.

=== Senior ===
Bunjaku's agent, Christoph Graf through an interview stated that Bunjaku has started the procedures for obtaining Kosovan passport and his wish is to play for Kosovo national team. On 22 March 2022, the Football Federation of Kosovo announced that Bunjaku had decided to represent their national team.
