= Gezim Pepsi =

Kosovan football player (born 1998)

Personal information
- Date of birth: 12 July 1998 (age 28)
- Place of birth: Basel, Switzerland
- Height: 1.81 m (5 ft 11 in)
- Position: Defensive midfielder

Team information
- Current team: Basel U21
- Number: 6

Youth career
- –2016: Basel

Senior career*
Years	Team	Apps	(Gls)
2016–2018	Basel U21	42	(3)
2018–2020	Basel	0	(0)
2018–2020	→ Aarau (loan)	29	(0)
2020–2022	Winterthur	52	(6)
2022–2023	Vaduz	15	(0)
2023–2024	Pirin Blagoevgrad	2	(0)
2024–	Basel U21	33	(3)

International career^{‡}
2014	Albania U17	3	(2)
2015	Switzerland U18	4	(0)
2016	Switzerland U19	4	(0)
2019–2020	Kosovo U21	4	(0)
- * Club domestic league appearances and goals as of 22 June 2025 ‡ National team caps and goals as of 13 October 2020

Gezim Pepsi (Note: Albanian: Gëzim Pepshi; Serbian Cyrillic: Геѕим Пепши, romanized: Gezim Pepši.) (born 12 July 1998) is a professional footballer who plays as a defensive midfielder for Swiss club Basel U21. Born in Switzerland, and a former Albanian and Swiss youth international, he has most recently represented Kosovo at under-21 level.

== Club career ==
=== Early career ===
Pepsi is a product of the Basel youth academy. He played for the U17, U18, U19 and U21 teams making a total of 99 appearances, scoring nine goals and assisting two. In 2018, Pepsi was loaned to Aarau as part of a partnership between the two clubs. Pepsi made 33 appearances for the Aarau. In February 2020, Pepsi told teammates he would be leaving Aarau, and subsequently was sold by parent club Basel to Winterthur.

=== Winterthur ===
Upon return from loan, Pepsi was bought by Winterthur in February 2020. His first goal for the club would come against Vaduz in June, the first match in the Swiss Challenge League since the COVID-19 enforced break. He scored against his former club Basel in the 2020–21 Swiss Cup round of 16, a game which Winterthur won 6–2. In May 2022, Pepsi was given a one-year contract extension with Winterthur.

=== Vaduz ===
On 30 August 2022, Pepsi joined Swiss Challenge League side Vaduz, on a one-year contract with the option of a further year. His debut with Vaduz came a day later in the 2022–23 Liechtenstein Cup round of 16 against Triesen II after being named in the starting line-up and scored his side's two goals during a 0–18 away deep win.

== International career ==
On 3 September 2014, Pepsi received the Albanian passport and this paved the way for him to represent Albania, which he represented at under-17 level in the 2015 UEFA European Under-17 Championship qualifications, making three appearances and scoring two goals against San Marino. He switched to Switzerland and made eight appearances for the under-18 and under-19 teams.

On 11 March 2019, Pepsi received a call-up from Kosovo U21 for the friendly matches against Turkmenistan U21 and Malta U21. His debut with Kosovo U21 came on 26 March in the friendly match against Malta U21 after being named in the starting line-up, while the competitive debut came on 15 November in the 2021 UEFA European Under-21 Championship qualification match against Albania U21 again after being named in the starting line-up.
