= 2020–21 Swiss Cup =

Tournament details
- Country: Switzerland
- Date: 29 August 2020 – 24 May 2021
- Teams: 37

Final positions
- Champions: Luzern (3rd title)
- Runners-up: St. Gallen

The 2020–21 Swiss Cup was the 96th season of Switzerland's annual football cup competition. The competition began on 29 August 2020 with the first games of Round 1, and ended on 24 May 2021.

Young Boys were the title holders, but lost to St. Gallen in the third round.

== Participating clubs ==
All teams from 2019–20 Super League and 2019–20 Challenge League. Due to the COVID-19 pandemic, only 18 slots (instead of 45) were allocated to teams from lower divisions. Those teams had to qualify through separate qualifying rounds within their leagues. Reserve teams and A-teams from Liechtenstein are not allowed in the competition, the latter only enter the 2020–21 Liechtenstein Cup.

**2020–21 Super League**; 9 teams	**2020–21 Challenge League**; 10 teams	**2020–21 Promotion League**; 3 teams	**2020–21 1. Liga**; 4 teams	**2020–21 2. Liga Interregional**; 4 teams	**2020–21 Regional leagues** 7 teams
FC Basel (BS); FC Lausanne-Sport (VD); FC Lugano (TI); **FC Luzern** (LU); FC Sion (VS); **FC St. Gallen** (SG); **Servette FC** (GE); BSC Young Boys^{TH} (BE); FC Zürich (ZH)	FC Aarau (AG); FC Chiasso (TI); Grasshopper Zürich (ZH); SC Kriens (LU); Neuchâtel Xamax FCS (NE); FC Schaffhausen (SH); FC Stade Lausanne Ouchy (VD); FC Thun (BE); FC Wil (SG); FC Winterthur (ZH)	FC Black Stars (BS); FC Köniz (BE); FC Stade Nyonnais (VD)	FC Schötz (LU); FC Solothurn (SO); FC Tuggen (ZG); FC Vevey United (VD)	FC Ajoie-Monterri (JU); FC Monthey (VS); SC Schöftland (AG); FC Sierre (VS)	**Sixth tier**: SC Balerna (TI); FC Dübendorf (ZH); FC Laufen (BL); FC Savièse (VS); **Seventh tier**: FC Dürrenast (BE); AS Haute-Broye (VD); FC Zollbrück (BE)

Teams in bold are still active in the competition.

^{TH} Title holders.

== Round 1 ==
Teams from Super League and Challenge League received a bye in this round. In a match, the home advantage was granted to the team from the lower league, if applicable. Teams in bold continue to the next round of the competition.

Team 1	Score	Team 2
**29 August 2020**
**FC Monthey** (5)	2–1	FC Black Stars (3)
AS Haute-Broye (7)	1–4	**FC Vevey United** (4)
**SC Schöftland** (5)	6–1	FC Sierre (5)
**30 August 2020**
FC Laufen (6)	0–6	**FC Solothurn** (4)
FC Dübendorf (6)	1–2	**FC Schötz** (4)
FC Savièse (6)	0–2	**SC Balerna** (6)
FC Zollbrück (7)	0–7	**FC Stade Nyonnais** (3)
FC Ajoie-Monterri (5)	0–2	**FC Tuggen** (4)
**31 August 2020**
FC Dürrenast (7)	1–5	**FC Köniz** (3)

== Round 2 ==
Teams engaged in UEFA competitions received a bye in this round. Teams from Super League were seeded. In a match, the home advantage was granted to the team from the lower league, if applicable. Teams in bold continue to the next round of the competition.

Team 1	Score	Team 2
**11 September 2020**
FC Schaffhausen (2)	1–2 (a.e.t.)	**FC Lugano** (1)
**12 September 2020**
FC Schötz (4)	0–3	**FC Sion** (1)
FC Tuggen (4)	1–2	**FC Winterthur** (2)
FC Stade Nyonnais (3)	1–3	**FC Lausanne-Sport** (1)
FC Stade Lausanne Ouchy (2)	1–2	**Grasshopper Zürich** (2)
**FC Aarau** (2)	0–0 (a.e.t.) (4–3 p)	FC Wil (2)
**FC Vevey United** (4)	3–0	FC Köniz (3)
**13 September 2020**
SC Schöftland (5)	1–5	**FC Solothurn** (4)
Neuchâtel Xamax FCS (2)	1–4	**SC Kriens** (2)
**FC Chiasso** (2)	3–2	FC Zürich (1)
FC Thun (2)	0–1	**FC Luzern** (1)
**26 September 2020**
SC Balerna (6)	1–2	**FC Monthey** (5)

== Round 3 ==
In a match, the home advantage was granted to the team from the lower league, if applicable. Teams in bold continue to the next round of the competition.

Team 1	Score	Team 2
**10 February 2021**
**FC Aarau** (2)	4–2	FC Sion (1)
FC Solothurn (4)	0–3 (w/o)	**SC Kriens** (2)
**17 February 2021**
**FC Winterthur** (2)	6–2	FC Basel (1)
**24 February 2021**
**Grasshopper Zürich** (2)	2–0	FC Lausanne-Sport (1)
**10 March 2021**
FC Chiasso (2)	1–2	**FC Luzern** (1)
**7 April 2021**
FC Vevey United (4)	2–4	**Servette FC** (1)
FC Monthey (5)	0–3	**FC Lugano** (1)
**8 April 2021**
**St. Gallen** (1)	4–1	BSC Young Boys (1)

== Quarter-finals ==
In a match, the home advantage was granted to the team from the lower league, if applicable. Teams in bold continue to the next round of the competition.

6 April 2021	**FC Aarau**	**3–0**	FC Winterthur	Aarau
18:00	Almeida 12'; Bergsma 41'; Gashi 41'			Stadium: Stadion Brügglifeld; Referee: Adrien Jaccottet

13 April 2021	FC Lugano	**1–2** (a.e.t.)	**FC Luzern**	Lugano
17:00	Lovrić 20'		79' Schürpf; 107' Ndiaye	Stadium: Cornaredo Stadium; Referee: Alain Bieri

14 April 2021	SC Kriens	**2–3** (a.e.t.)	**Servette FC**	Kriens
17:00	Mistrafovic 24'; Sessolo 78'		67' Cognat; 85' Kyei; 107' Ondoua	Stadium: Stadion Kleinfeld; Referee: Nikolaj Hänni

14 April 2021	Grasshopper Zürich	**1–2**	**St. Gallen**	Zurich
18:00	Bonatini 90+3'		5' Görtler; 18' Víctor Ruiz	Stadium: Stade du Letzigrund; Referee: Fedayi San

== Semi-finals ==
Teams in bold continue to the next round of the competition.

4 May 2021	FC Aarau	**1–2**	**FC Luzern**	Aarau
17:30	Almeida 10'		4' Ndiaye; 74' Tasar	Stadium: Stadion Brügglifeld; Referee: Sandro Schärer

5 May 2021	Servette FC	**0–1**	**St. Gallen**	Lancy
17:00			84' Stillhart	Stadium: Stade de Genève; Referee: Adrien Jaccottet

== Final ==
24 May 2021	**St. Gallen**	**1–3**	**FC Luzern**	Bern
15:00	Adamu 42'	Report	27' Ndiaye; 31' Wehrmann; 71' Schürpf	Stadium: Stadion Wankdorf; Referee: Lionel Tschudi
