= Christopher Lungoyi =

Football player

Personal information
- Date of birth: 4 July 2000 (age 26)
- Place of birth: Kinshasa, DR Congo
- Height: 1.82 m (6 ft 0 in)
- Position: Forward

Team information
- Current team: Wieczysta Kraków
- Number: 88

Youth career
- –2011: FC Plan-les-Ouates
- 2011–2018: Servette
- 2018–2020: Porto

Senior career*
Years	Team	Apps	(Gls)
2017–2018	Servette	4	(0)
2019–2020	Porto B	0	(0)
2020–2021	Lugano	24	(2)
2021–2024	Juventus	0	(0)
2021–2022	→ Lugano (loan)	23	(1)
2022	→ St. Gallen (loan)	15	(2)
2022–2023	→ Ascoli (loan)	27	(1)
2023–2024	→ Yverdon-Sport (loan)	25	(2)
2024–2026	Gaziantep	58	(5)
2026–	Wieczysta Kraków	0	(0)

International career
2014–2015	Switzerland U15	4	(0)
2015	Switzerland U16	1	(0)
2016–2017	Switzerland U17	5	(1)
2017–2018	Switzerland U18	4	(1)
2018	Switzerland U19	2	(0)
2019	Switzerland U20	1	(0)
2021	Switzerland U21	3	(0)
- * Club domestic league appearances and goals as of 10 June 2026

Christopher Lungoyi (born 4 July 2000) is a professional footballer who plays as a forward for Ekstraklasa club Wieczysta Kraków. Born in the Democratic Republic of the Congo, Lungoyi represents Switzerland internationally at youth level.

== Club career ==
On 21 January 2021, Lungoyi joined Serie A side Juventus on a permanent deal; he was loaned back to Lugano for the remainder of the season.

On 14 January 2022, he was loaned to St. Gallen.

On 6 July 2022, Lungoyi was loaned to Ascoli with an option to buy.

On 11 August 2023, Lungoyi moved on a new loan to Yverdon-Sport.

On 2 September 2024, Lungoyi signed a contract with Gaziantep in Turkey for two seasons with an option for a third.

On 29 June 2026, Lungoyi was announced to be joining Polish top-flight newcomers Wieczysta Kraków on a two-year deal. The following day, Gaziantep issued a statement claiming Lungoyi's contract with them was still in effect, and they would be pursuing legal action against him and Wieczysta.

== Career statistics ==
As of match played 16 May 2026

Appearances and goals by club, season and competition
Club	Season	League			National cup (Note: Includes Swiss Cup, Coppa Italia, Turkish Cup)		Other		Total	
Club	Season	Division	Apps	Goals	Apps	Goals	Apps	Goals	Apps	Goals
Servette	2016–17	Swiss Challenge League	1	0	0	0	0	0	1	0
Servette	2017–18	Swiss Challenge League	3	0	1	0	0	0	4	0
Servette	Total		4	0	1	0	0	0	5	0
Porto B	2019–20	LigaPro	0	0	—		0	0	0	0
Lugano	2019–20	Swiss Super League	12	2	0	0	0	0	12	2
Lugano	2020–21	Swiss Super League	12	0	1	0	0	0	13	0
Lugano	Total		24	2	1	0	0	0	25	2
Juventus	2020–21	Serie A	0	0	0	0	0	0	0	0
Lugano (loan)	2020–21	Swiss Super League	14	1	2	3	—		16	4
Lugano (loan)	2021–22	Swiss Super League	9	0	3	2	—		12	2
Lugano (loan)	Total		23	1	5	5	—		28	6
St. Gallen (loan)	2021–22	Swiss Super League	15	2	1	0	—		16	2
Ascoli (loan)	2022–23	Serie B	27	1	2	0	—		29	1
Yverdon-Sport (loan)	2023–24	Swiss Super League	25	2	1	0	—		26	2
Gaziantep	2024–25	Süper Lig	29	2	3	0	—		32	2
Gaziantep	2025–26	Süper Lig	29	3	4	2	—		33	5
Gaziantep	Total		58	5	7	2	—		65	7
Wieczysta Kraków	2026–27	Ekstraklasa	0	0	0	0	—		0	0
Career total			176	13	18	7	0	0	194	20
