= Carlo Manicone =

Swiss footballer (born 1998)

Personal information
- Date of birth: 26 January 1998 (age 28)
- Place of birth: Lugano, Switzerland
- Height: 1.83 m (6 ft 0 in)
- Position: Forward

Team information
- Current team: Varesina
- Number: 19

Youth career
- 2013–2014: Team Ticino
- 2014–2015: Juventus
- 2015–2017: Empoli

Senior career*
Years	Team	Apps	(Gls)
2017–2022	Lugano	11	(1)
2019	→ Chiasso (loan)	14	(1)
2019–2020	→ Bisceglie (loan)	11	(0)
2020	→ Pianese (loan)	5	(0)
2020–2021	→ Grosseto (loan)	2	(0)
2021–2022	→ Chiasso (loan)	39	(4)
2022–2023	Chiasso	13	(5)
2023	SC Kriens	14	(4)
2023–2024	Varesina	34	(12)
2024–2025	Piacenza	15	(0)
2025–2026	Pro Sesto	17	(0)
2025–	Varesina	15	(7)
- * Club domestic league appearances and goals as of 1 July 2026

Carlo Manicone (born 26 January 1998) is a Swiss professional footballer who plays as a forward for Italian Serie D club Varesina.

== Professional career ==
Manicone began his footballing career Switzerland with Team Ticino, before joining the youth academies of Juventus and Empoli in Italy. After being the player of the tournament for Empoli in the Torneo di Viareggio, on 27 July 2017 Manicone signed a four-year contract with Lugano.

Manicone made his professional debut for Lugano in a 1–0 Swiss Super League to St. Gallen on 16 August 2017. He injured the anterior cruciate ligament of his knee in the last matchday of the 2017–18 season, and was successfully operated requiring a recovery period of 6 months.

On 23 January 2019, Manicone was loaned out to Chiasso for the rest of the season.

On 2 September 2019, he joined Italian club Bisceglie on loan. On 22 January 2020, he moved on another Serie C loan to Pianese. On 6 October 2020, he was loaned to Serie C club Grosseto. On 7 January 2021, he returned to Chiasso on another loan. In July 2022, he made a permanent move to Chiasso.

In February 2023, Manicone moved to SC Kriens. In July 2023, Manicone joined Italian Serie D club Varesina.

== Personal life ==
Manicone is the son of Antonio Manicone, who was also a professional footballer and former international of the Italy national football team.
