= Ransford Selasi =

Ghanaianl footballer (born 1996)

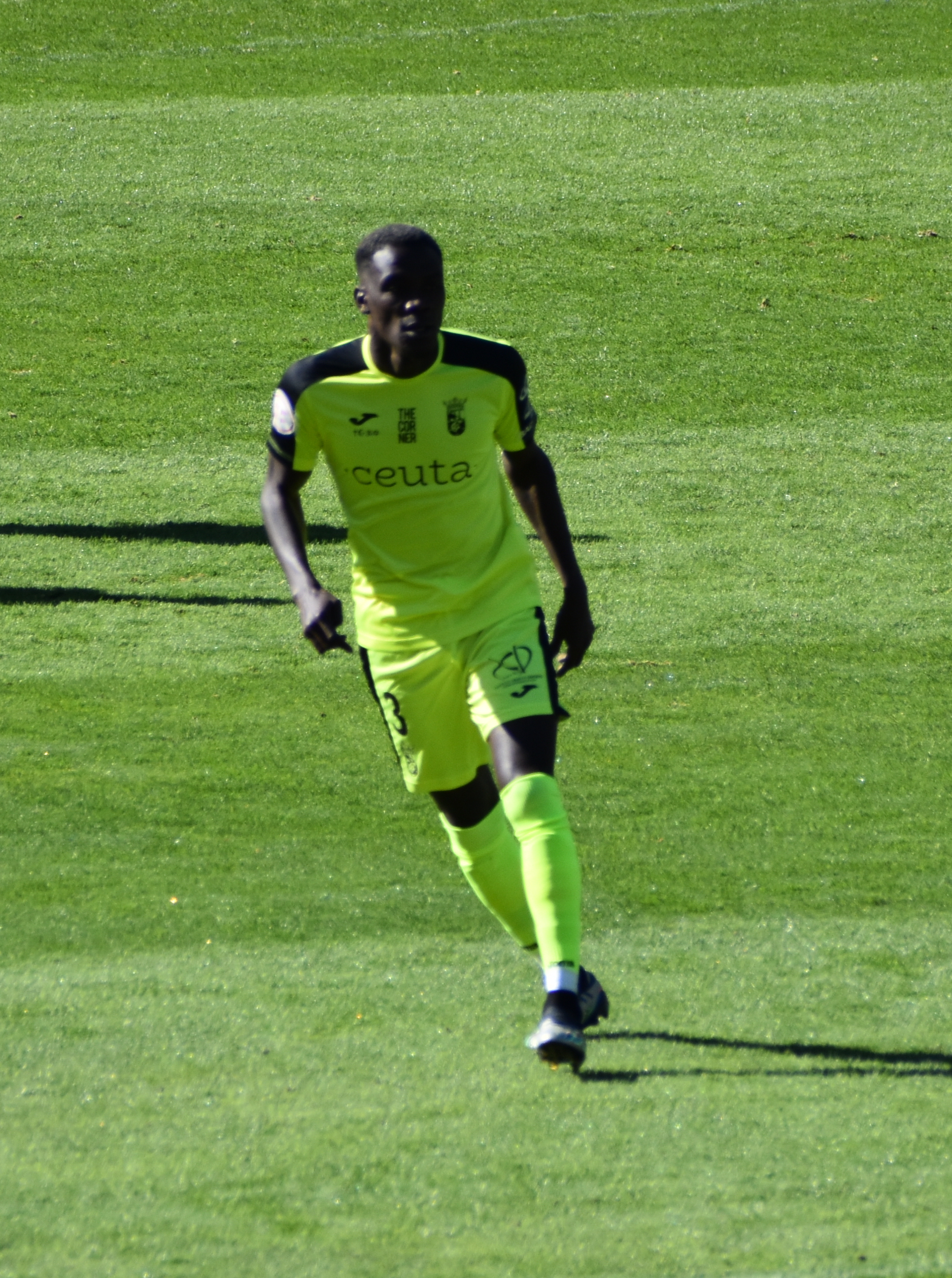

Personal information
- Date of birth: 19 August 1996 (age 30)
- Place of birth: Obuasi, Ghana
- Height: 1.80 m (5 ft 11 in)
- Position: Midfielder

Team information
- Current team: Chieti
- Number: 8

Youth career
- Pescara

Senior career*
Years	Team	Apps	(Gls)
2013–2019	Pescara	43	(0)
2016–2017	→ Novara (loan)	13	(0)
2018	→ Lecce (loan)	8	(0)
2018–2019	→ Fano (loan)	31	(0)
2019–2020	Juventus	0	(0)
2019–2020	→ Juventus U23 (res.)	3	(0)
2020	→ Lugano (loan)	7	(0)
2020–2021	Lugano	0	(0)
2021	→ Kriens (loan)	19	(0)
2021–2022	Kriens	24	(0)
2023	Ceuta	15	(0)
2023	Estepona FS	15	(0)
2024	Melilla	14	(0)
2024–2025	Compostela	18	(0)
2026–	Chieti	7	(0)
- * Club domestic league appearances and goals as of 1 March 2026

Ransford Selasi (born 19 August 1996) is a Ghanaian professional footballer who plays as a midfielder for Italian Serie D club Chieti.

== Club career ==
Selasi was born in Ghana and joined the Italian club Pescara at an early age, and progressed through the club's youth systems. On 2 December 2013 he made his first-team debut, coming on as a late substitute in a 0–3 loss against Spezia at Stadio Alberto Picco in that season's Coppa Italia.

On 31 August 2018, he joined Serie C club Fano on a season-long loan.

On 30 August 2019, he moved to Juventus on a permanent basis. On 14 February 2020, he was loaned to FC Lugano in Switzerland until the end of the 2019–20 season.

FC Lugano bought Selasi free by the end of the loan spell. Selasi made no appearances for Lugano in the first half of the 2020–21 season, why he signed a loan deal on 11 January 2021 with SC Kriens for the rest of the season.
