= Julian von Moos =

Swiss footballer (born 2001)

Personal information
- Full name: Julian Tobias Emilio von Moos
- Date of birth: 1 April 2001 (age 25)
- Place of birth: Salmsach, Switzerland
- Height: 1.81 m (5 ft 11 in)
- Position: Forward

Team information
- Current team: Grasshopper Club Zürich
- Number: 81

Youth career
- –2013: FC Romanshorn
- 2013–2016: FC St. Gallen
- 2016–2018: Grasshopper Club Zürich
- 2018–2020: FC Basel

Senior career*
Years	Team	Apps	(Gls)
2018–2020	Basel U-21	33	(3)
2019–2022	FC Basel	17	(1)
2020	→ FC Wil (loan)	13	(7)
2021	→ Vitesse (loan)	5	(0)
2022–2024	St. Gallen	59	(9)
2024–	Servette	16	(0)
2025–2026	→ Luzern (loan)	23	(4)
2026–	Grasshopper	0	(0)

International career^{‡}
2016–2017	Switzerland U16	7	(0)
2017–2018	Switzerland U17	13	(5)
2018–2020	Switzerland U19	8	(1)
2020	Switzerland U20	1	(0)
2022–2023	Switzerland U21	8	(1)
- * Club domestic league appearances and goals as of 8 August 2026 ‡ National team caps and goals as of 1 July 2023

Julian Tobias Emilio von Moos (born 1 April 2001) is a Swiss professional footballer who plays as a forward for Swiss Super League club Grasshopper Club Zürich.

== Football career ==
=== Youth football ===
Von Moos started his youth football with local club FC Romanshorn. In January 2013 he moved on to the youth movement of St. Gallen and for the season 2016–2017 he moved on again and joined the youth department of Grasshopper Club Zürich. While with the Grasshoppers he was called up by the youth national team and joined the Swiss U16 team.

=== Basel ===
On 9 July 2018 FC Basel announced that they had signed a contract with von Moos dated up until June 2021. During their 2018–19 season, under head coach Marcel Koller, von Moos attended the trainings of their first team but played for their U-21 team. He played 20 games for them. After appearing in two test games with the first team, von Moos played his domestic league debut for his new club in the home game in the St. Jakob-Park on 25 May 2019 as Basel played against Xamax and he was substituted in after 74 minutes. He scored his first goal for his club in the same game, it was the last goal of the game as Basel won 4–1.

Also during their 2019–20 season von Moos attended the trainings of Basel's first team but played 13 games for their U-21 team up until Christmas. After playing in another four test games, von Moos was given another chance to play a league match. He was substituted in the away game against Young Boys on 26 January.

=== Wil ===
On 7 February 2020 Basel announced that they were loaning von Moss out to FC Wil until the end of the 2019–20 season. Under head coach Ciriaco Sforza the Swiss U19 international would receive more match practice in the Challenge League, the second-highest tier of Swiss football. Von Moos played his first league game under Sforza for Wil on 15 February 2020 as they played a goalless draw with Schaffhausen. He scored his first goal for the club on 30 June in the away game against Grasshopper Club. The loan was successful for all three parties, Basel, Wil and the player himself. Von Moos played 13 games and scored seven goals during this period.

=== Return to Basel ===
As the loan contract ran out von Moos returned to Basel. A few days later, on 26 August, the club announced that Ciriaco Sforza had been hired as the first team manager and he brought his assistant Daniel Hasler with him. Von Moos played his first game under Sforza for Basel on 20 September as Basel played a 2–2 draw with Vaduz.

==== Loan to Vitesse ====
In July 2021, he joined Vitesse in Eredivisie on a season-long loan, with an option to buy.

=== St. Gallen ===
On 3 January 2022, Von Moos joined St. Gallen for an undisclosed fee, signing a deal until the summer of 2024.

=== Servette ===
On 4 June 2024, Von Moos signed a three-year contract with Servette.

==== Loan to Luzern ====
On 21 July 2025, he joined FC Luzern on loan for the 2025–26 season, with an option to buy.

=== Grasshopper Club Zürich ===
On 14 August 2026, he returned to his former youth club Grasshopper Club Zürich.

== International career ==
Von Moos was born in Switzerland to a Brazilian father and Swiss mother. He is a youth international for Switzerland.

He represented Switzerland at the 2023 UEFA European Under-21 Championship, where they reached quarterfinals.

== Career statistics ==
=== Club ===
As of 16 June 2019

Appearances and goals by club, season and competition
Club	Season	League			Cup		Continental		Other-		Total	
Club	Season	Division	Apps	Goals	Apps	Goals	Apps	Goals	Apps	Goals	Apps	Goals
Basel U21	2018–19	Swiss Promotion League	20	2	0	0	–		0	0	20	2
Basel	2018–19	Swiss Super League	1	1	0	0	–		0	0	1	1
Career total			21	3	0	0	0	0	0	0	21	3
