= Tician Tushi =

Swiss footballer (born 2001)

Personal information
- Date of birth: 2 April 2001 (age 25)
- Place of birth: Grenchen, Switzerland
- Height: 1.79 m (5 ft 10 in)
- Position: Forward

Team information
- Current team: Paradiso
- Number: 7

Youth career
- 2010–2013: Biel-Bienne
- 2013–2016: Young Boys
- 2017–2019: Basel

Senior career*
Years	Team	Apps	(Gls)
2018–2023	Basel II	53	(18)
2019–2023	Basel	12	(0)
2021	→ Wil (loan)	16	(5)
2022	→ Winterthur (loan)	18	(4)
2023	→ Xamax (loan)	4	(0)
2023–2024	Baden	3	(0)
2025–2026	Biel-Bienne	19	(2)
2026–	Paradiso	10	(1)

International career^{‡}
2016–2017	Switzerland U16	6	(2)
2017–2018	Switzerland U17	11	(4)
2019	Switzerland U18	3	(0)
2020	Switzerland U19	1	(0)
2020	Switzerland U20	1	(0)
- * Club domestic league appearances and goals as of 22 June 2026 ‡ National team caps and goals as of 7 October 2020

Tician Tushi (born 2 April 2001) is a Swiss professional footballer who plays as a forward for Paradiso.

== Club career ==
After playing his youth football with Biel-Bienne and the Young Boys, Tushi moved to FC Basel on 16 December 2016 and joined their U-17 team. He advanced through the ranks and on 16 June 2018, playing for their U-18 team under coach Alexander Frei, he scored two goals in the Championship playoff final to secure his side the national title.

In the 2018–19 season Tushi advanced to Basel's U-21 side under coach Arjan Peço, playing in the Promotion League, the third highest tier in the Swiss football league system, and he immediately became regular starter playing 27 games, scoring 10 goals. He was also visiting the first team's trainings and after playing in two test games, at the end of the season on 22 May 2019, Tushi played his domestic league debut for the team in the away game in the Stockhorn Arena coming is as substitute as Basel won 2–1 against Thun.

In the 2019–20 season Tushi also played in the U-21 team. But here it could be seen that he was prone to injuries, missing a number of games due to a calf muscle tear. Nevertheless, on 1 October 2019 the club announced that they and Tushi had agreed on an early extension of his contract. The contract was extended for another three years, until summer 2023. After the winter break, and after the Covid lockdown, the striker was taken up to Basel's first team by the then manager Marcel Koller and had seven league appearances and one in the cup.

Before the beginning of the Basel's 2020–21 season Ciriaco Sforza was appointed as new first team head coach. Tushi had four appearances in the first team, coming on as substitute in each case. He also played in the U-21 team, four outings, scoring two goals. After the winter break, on 14 January 2021, the club announced that they were loaning Tushi to FC Wil 1900 in the Challenge League until the end of the season so that he could gain further playing practice. The head coach in Wil was Alexander Frei, who had trained Tushi in Basel's U-18, and he used Tushi in the starting eleven on 16 occasions, in which he scored five times. But the period came to an early end, as Tushi injured himself in the match against Kriens on 24 April.

Patrick Rahmen had taken over as head coach before the 2021–22 season, Although Tushi trained with the first team, he played mainly in U-21 team, scoring two goals in nine outings. For the first team he had two appearances in the 2021–22 Swiss Cup and in the first, on 15 August 2021 he scored a brace, the team's first and their last goal as Basel won 7–0 against amateur club FC Schönenwerd-Niedergösgen. On 7 January 2022, the club announced that they were loaning Tushi out to Winterthur until the end of the season. Winterthur confirmed the loan the same day. Winterthur were playing in the 2021–22 Challenge League and head coach was Alexander Frei. Frei used Tushi in every single match up until the end of the season. Tushi thanked him by scoring a goal on five occasions. At the end of the season, they became division champions and won promotion.

For their 2022–23 season Basel hired Alexander Frei as their new head coach. Again, Tushi trained with the first team. He played in four test games and had one appearance in the 2022–23 Swiss Cup, in the starting formation, as they beat local amateur club FC Allschwil 5–0, on 21 August. He also had one appearance in the 2022–23 UEFA Europa Conference League, on 21 July, as Basel beat Northern Irish team Crusaders 2–0, he came on as substitute. However, Tushi again played in the U-21 team, but on 10 September, in his fourth game of the season he suffered a tear in the collateral ligament in his knee and missed all matches until the end of the year for this as the club announced a few days later. The club then announced, on 30 January 2023, that Tushi was loaned out to Xamax. Xamax confirmed the loan move on the same day. Tushi played four games and the injury reoccurred and he missed the rest of the season.

Tushi's contract with Basel ran out in the summer of 2023 and it was not renewed. During his time with Basel, Tushi played a total of 29 games for Basel scoring a total of four goals. 12 of these games were in the Swiss Super League, four in the Swiss Cup, one in the UEFA Europa Conference League and 12 were friendly games. He scored two goals in the cup and the other two were scored during the test games. He also played 57 games with the U-21 team, scoring 18 goals.

On 7 September 2023, Tushi signed a contract with Baden.

== International career ==
Tushi was a youth international for Switzerland.

== Personal life ==
Tushi was born in Switzerland and is of Kosovan Albanian descent. Tushi completed a commercial apprenticeship with FCB's leading partner Novartis.

== Career statistics ==
=== Club ===
As of match played 23 August 2023

Appearances and goals by club, season and competition
Club	Season	League			National Cup (Note: Includes Swiss Cup)		Europe		Other		Total	
Club	Season	Division	Apps	Goals	Apps	Goals	Apps	Goals	Apps	Goals	Apps	Goals
Basel U21	2018–19	Promotion League	28	10	—		—		—		28	10
Basel U21	2019–20	Promotion League	8	2	—		—		—		8	2
Basel U21	2020–21	Promotion League	4	2	—		—		—		4	2
Basel U21	2021–22	Promotion League	9	2	—		—		—		9	2
Basel U21	2022–23	Promotion League	4	2	—		—		—		4	2
Basel U21	Total		53	18	—		—		—		53	18
Basel	2018–19	Super League	1	0	0	0	0	0	—		1	0
Basel	2019–20	Super League	7	0	1	0	0	0	—		8	0
Basel	2020–21	Super League	4	0	0	0	0	0	—		4	0
Basel	2021–22	Super League	0	0	2	2	0	0	—		2	2
Basel	2022–23	Super League	0	0	1	0	1 (Note: Appearance(s) in UEFA Conference League)	0	—		2	0
Basel	Total		12	0	4	2	1	0	—		17	2
Wil (loan)	2020–21	Challenge League	16	5	0	0	—		—		16	5
Winterthur (loan)	2021–22	Challenge League	18	4	0	0	—		—		18	4
Neuchâtel Xamax (loan)	2022–23	Challenge League	4	0	0	0	—		—		4	0
Career total			103	27	4	2	1	0	—		108	29

== Honours ==
Basel

- U-18 Championship: 2017–18

Winterthur

- Swiss Challenge League: 2021–22
