= Yves Kaiser =

Swiss footballer (born 1998)

Personal information
- Date of birth: 30 April 1998 (age 28)
- Place of birth: Solothurn, Switzerland
- Height: 1.82 m (6 ft 0 in)
- Position: Centre back

Team information
- Current team: Solothurn
- Number: 5

Youth career
- 2005–2010: Luterbach
- 2010–2013: Solothurn
- 2013–2018: Basel

Senior career*
Years	Team	Apps	(Gls)
2016–2019	Basel U21	63	(4)
2018–2020	Basel	6	(0)
2020	→ Schaffhausen (loan)	14	(0)
2020–2021	Xamax	13	(0)
2021–	Solothurn	8	(0)

International career
2013	Switzerland U16	1	(0)
2017–2019	Switzerland U20	10	(0)
- * Club domestic league appearances and goals as of 16 October 2021

Yves Kaiser (born 30 April 1998) is a Swiss professional footballer who plays as a centre-back for Solothurn.

== Club career ==
Kaiser started his youth football by local club FC Luterbach, but moved to FC Solothurn as 12 year old. Three years later he moved to the youth academy of FC Basel and advanced through all stages. On 16 March 2018 Yves Kaiser, the captain of the U-21 team, signed his first professional contract with the club over a two year period until the summer of 2020. He then joined Basel's first team during their 2018–19 season under head coach Marcel Koller. Kaiser had already played 12 test games with team, as he made his professional debut for them on 24 July 2018 in the 2018–19 UEFA Champions League qualifying phase, but the match against Greek team PAOK ended in a 2–1 defeat. Kaiser played his domestic league debut with the team in the home game in the St. Jakob-Park on 9 December as Basel won 2–0 against Zürich.

Under trainer Marcel Koller Basel won the Swiss Cup in the 2018–19 season. In the first round Basel beat Montlingen 3–0, in the second round Echallens Région 7–2 and in the round of 16 Winterthur 1–0. In the quarter-finals Sion were defeated 4–2 after extra time and in the semi-finals Zürich were defeated 3–1. All these games were played away from home. The final was held on the 19 May 2019 in the Stade de Suisse Wankdorf Bern against Thun. Striker Albian Ajeti scored the first goal, Fabian Frei the second for Basel, then Dejan Sorgić netted a goal for Thun, but the end result was 2–1 for Basel. Kaiser played in one of these cup games.

On 3 January 2020, FC Basel confirmed that Kaiser had been loaned out to FC Schaffhausen for the rest of the 2019–20 season. Following this loan period he returned to the club and played in another four test games. On 10 September 2020 Basel confirmed that Kaiser had transferred to Neuchâtel Xamax.

During the 2020–21 season Kaiser played 13 league matches for Xamax and then he transferred back to his club of origin FC Solothurn.

== Honours ==
Basel

- Swiss Cup winner: 2018–19
