= Konstantinos Dimitriou =

Greek association football player (born 1999)

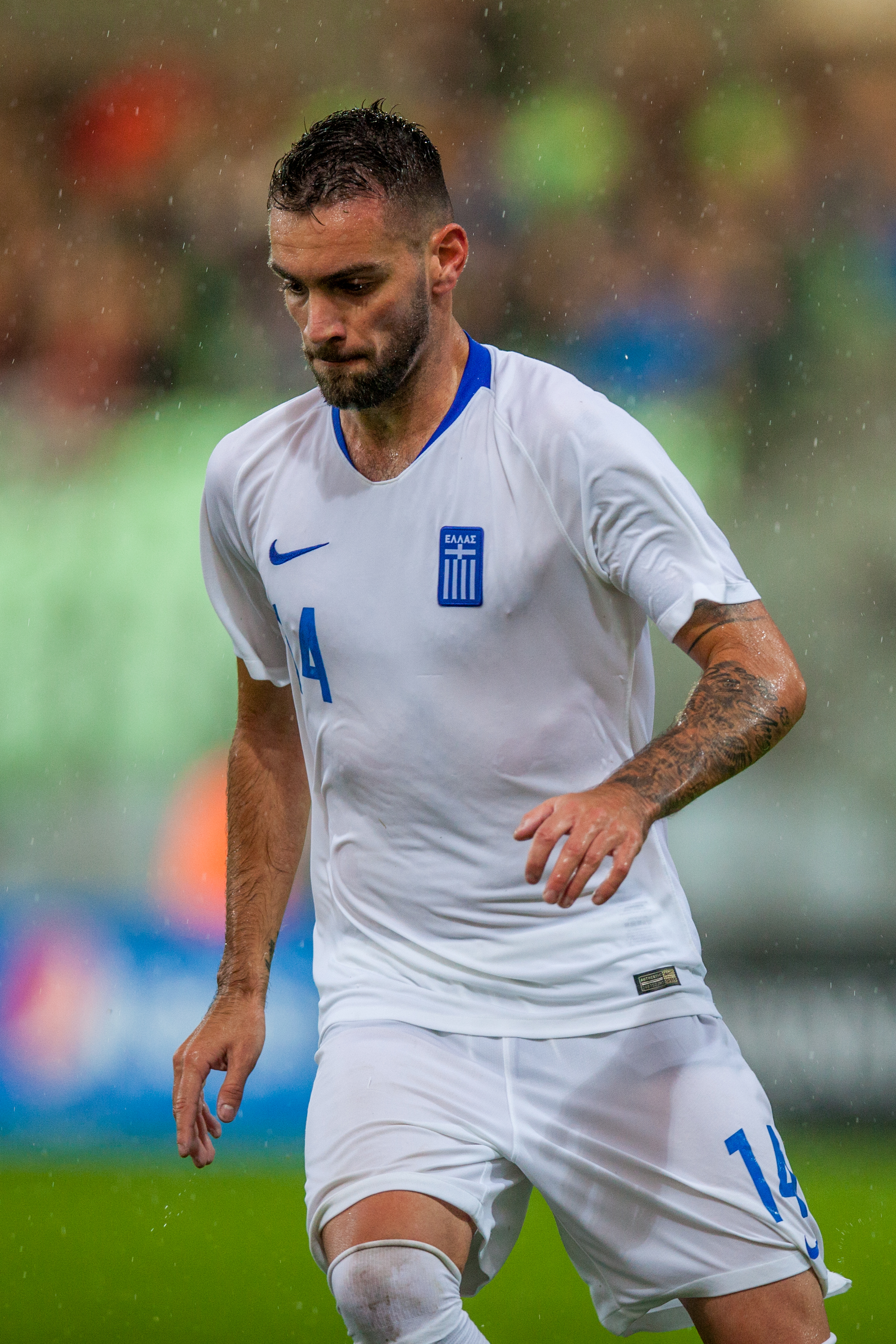
- Dimitriou with Greece U21 in 2019

Personal information
- Full name: Konstantinos Dimitriou
- Date of birth: 30 June 1999 (age 27)
- Place of birth: Giannitsa, Greece
- Height: 1.86 m (6 ft 1 in)
- Position: Centre-back

Team information
- Current team: PAS Pyrgos
- Number: 4

Youth career
- 2004–2013: Anagennisi Giannitsa
- 2013–2018: PAOK
- 2018–2019: Basel U21

Senior career*
Years	Team	Apps	(Gls)
2019–2021	Basel	1	(0)
2020	→ Wil (loan)	2	(0)
2021	Mezőkövesd	1	(0)
2021–2023	Panserraikos	18	(0)
2023–2025	Diagoras	31	(1)
2025–2026	Iraklis	9	(0)
2026–	PAS Pyrgos	3	(0)

International career^{‡}
2015–2016	Greece U17	9	(0)
2017–2018	Greece U19	10	(0)
2019	Greece U21	8	(0)
- * Club domestic league appearances and goals as of September 27, 2026 ‡ National team caps and goals as of October 14, 2019

Konstantinos Dimitriou (Greek: Κωνσταντίνος Δημητρίου; born 30 June 1999) is a Greek professional association football player who plays as a centre-back for Super League 2 club PAS Pyrgos.

== Career ==
=== Early career ===
Dimitriou began playing football at the age of 4 in the youth academy of Anagennisi Giannitsa, and moved to PAOK in 2013.

=== Basel ===
On 11 May 2018, Swiss club Basel announced that they had signed Dimitriou from the youth department of PAOK. At the beginning of his stay with the club Dimitriu played at trainer with Basel's U21 team, where he had 18 appearances. To the start of their 2019–20 season under head coach Marcel Koller Dimitriu advanced to Basel's first team. After playing in four test games he played his domestic league debut for the club in the away game in the Stockhorn Arena on 3 August 2019 as Basel won 3–2 against Thun. Two weeks later he played in the Swiss Cup away match against amateur club Pully Football. This was his last appearance in the first team, because after visiting his family in Greece he was tested corona positive. Following his recovery he returned to the U21 team.

==== Loan to Wil ====
During the winter break of the 2019–20 season, on 9 January 2020, Dimitriou was loaned to Wil until the end of the season.

==== Return to Basel ====
Following his loan period Dimitriou returned to Basel, but only appeared in one test match. On 28 January 2020 it was announced that he transferred to Mezőkövesd. Between the years 2018 and 2021 Dimitriou played a total of 12 games for Basel's first team without scoring a goal. One of these games were in the Swiss Super League, one in the Swiss Cup and 10 were friendly games.

=== Mezőkövesd ===
Dimitriou moved to Hungary and stayed with Mezőkövesd until the end of the season.

== Career statistics ==
As of 26 March 2026

Club	Season	League			Cup		Continental		Other		Total	
Club	Season	Division	Apps	Goals	Apps	Goals	Apps	Goals	Apps	Goals	Apps	Goals
Basel	2019–20	Swiss Super League	1	0	1	0	—		—		2	0
Wil (loan)	2019–20	Challenge League	2	0	0	0	—		—		2	0
Mezőkövesd	2020–21	NB I	1	0	0	0	—		—		1	0
Panserraikos	2021–22	Superleague Greece 2	13	0	3	0	—		—		16	0
Panserraikos	2022–23	Superleague Greece 2	5	0	2	0	—		—		7	0
Panserraikos	Total		18	0	5	0	—		—		23	0
Diagoras	2023–24	Superleague Greece 2	25	1	2	0	—		—		27	1
Diagoras	2024–25	Superleague Greece 2	6	0	3	0	—		—		9	0
Diagoras	Total		31	1	5	0	—		—		36	1
Iraklis	2024–25	Superleague Greece 2	1	0	0	0	—		—		1	0
Iraklis	2025–26	Superleague Greece 2	8	0	4	0	—		—		12	0
Iraklis	Total		9	0	4	0	—		—		13	0
Career total			62	4	15	0	0	0	0	0	77	4

== Honours ==
=== Basel ===
- Swiss Cup: 2018–19
