= Jozef Pukaj =

Kosovan footballer (born 2000)

Personal information
- Date of birth: 13 February 2000 (age 26)
- Place of birth: Riehen, Switzerland
- Height: 1.92 m (6 ft 4 in)
- Position: Goalkeeper

Youth career
- 2009–2011: FC Amicitia Riehen
- 2011–2017: Basel

Senior career*
| Years | Team | Apps | (Gls) |
| 2017–2021 | Basel U21 | 45 | (0) |
| 2018–2021 | Basel | 0 | (0) |
| 2021 | → Stade Lausanne Ouchy (loan) | 0 | (0) |
| 2021–2023 | Winterthur | 7 | (0) |

International career
| 2015–2016 | Switzerland U16 | 6 | (0) |
| 2016–2017 | Switzerland U17 | 9 | (0) |
| 2017 | Switzerland U18 | 1 | (0) |
| 2019 | Switzerland U19 | 2 | (0) |
| 2019 | Switzerland U20 | 2 | (0) |
| 2022 | Kosovo | 1 | (0) |
- * Club domestic league appearances and goals

Jozef Pukaj (born 13 February 2000) is a Kosovan former professional footballer who played as a goalkeeper.

== Club career ==
Pukaj is a product of the youth academies of FC Amicitia Riehen and Basel. On 20 January 2021, he joined Stade Lausanne Ouchy on loan for the second half of the 2020-21 season. On 2 June 2021, he transferred to the Swiss Challenge League club Winterthur. He made one appearance in the Challenge League that season, as they won the tournament and earned promotion into the Swiss Super League for the 2022-23 season. He made his professional debut with Winterthur in a 1–1 Swiss Super League tie with his childhood club Basel on 16 July 2022.

== International career ==
Born and raised in Switzerland, Pukaj is of Kosovo Albanian origin. From 2015, until 2019, he has been part of Switzerland at youth international level, respectively has been part of the U16, U17, U18, U19 and U20 teams and he with these teams played 20 matches.

On 11 November 2022, Pukaj received a call-up from Kosovo for the friendly matches against Armenia and Faroe Islands. His debut with Kosovo came eight days later in a friendly match against Faroe Islands after being named in the starting line-up.

== Retirement ==
On 12 September 2023, Pukaj decided to retire from playing football professionally due to multiple injuries.

== Honours ==
Winterthur

- Swiss Challenge League: 2021–22
