= Yannick Marchand (Swiss footballer) =

Swiss footballer (born 2000)

Personal information
- Full name: Yannick Kevin Marchand
- Date of birth: 9 February 2000 (age 26)
- Place of birth: Basel, Switzerland
- Height: 1.83 m (6 ft 0 in)
- Position: Midfielder

Team information
- Current team: Basel II
- Number: 27

Youth career
- 2007–2009: FC Aesch
- 2009–2019: Basel

Senior career*
| Years | Team | Apps | (Gls) |
| 2018–2022 | Basel II | 43 | (5) |
| 2019–2023 | Basel | 21 | (1) |
| 2021–2022 | → Grenoble (loan) | 6 | (0) |
| 2022 | → Neuchâtel Xamax (loan) | 10 | (0) |
| 2023–2024 | Grasshopper II | 22 | (1) |
| 2024–2026 | Rapperswil-Jona | 47 | (11) |
| 2026– | Basel II | 3 | (1) |

International career^{‡}
| 2016–2017 | Switzerland U17 | 10 | (1) |
| 2017–2018 | Switzerland U18 | 4 | (2) |
| 2018–2019 | Switzerland U19 | 8 | (1) |
| 2019 | Switzerland U20 | 5 | (3) |
| 2020–2021 | Switzerland U21 | 2 | (0) |
- * Club domestic league appearances and goals as of 26 September 2026 ‡ National team caps and goals as of 21 May 2022

Yannick Kevin Marchand (born 9 February 2000) is a Swiss professional footballer who plays as a defender for Swiss Promotion League side Basel II.

== Club career ==
Marchand signed his first professional contract with Basel on 19 April 2018 for 3 years. Marchand made his professional debut for Basel in a 3–2 Swiss Super League win over Luzern on 15 May 2019.

On 16 July 2021, he joined French club Grenoble on loan for the 2021–22 season. His loan was eventually cut short, and he joined Neuchâtel Xamax on loan.

On 16 February 2023, he terminated his contract with Basel early and joined Grasshopper Club Zürich, where he will strengthen their U21 squad, who plays in the 1. Liga Classic.
