= 2017–18 FC Basel season =

FC Basel
2017–18 season
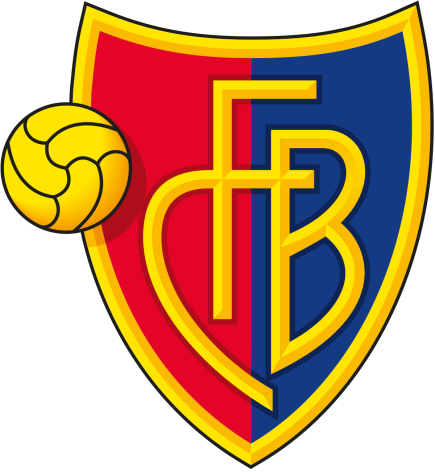
- Owner: FCB Holding
- Chairman: Bernhard Burgener
- Manager: Raphaël Wicky
- Ground: St. Jakob-Park, Basel, Switzerland
- Super League: 2nd
- Swiss Cup: Semi-finals
- Champions League: Round of 16
- Top goalscorer: League: Albian Ajeti (14); All: Albian Ajeti (14)
Home colours	Away colours

The 2017–18 FC Basel season was the 125th season in club history and the club's 23rd consecutive season in the top flight of Swiss football. Basel were the reigning Swiss Super League champions. The season started on the weekend of 22–23 July 2017 and ended on 19 May 2018. They were also the Swiss Cup holders. The first round of the Swiss Cup was played on 13 August 2017. Basel were also qualified for this season's Champions League in the Group stage. The first round was played on 12 September 2017.

== Club ==
=== Management ===
Raphaël Wicky was appointed as new first team manager and was given a two-year contract with an option for a third year. His assistant is Massimo Lombardo and further members of the training staff are Werner Leuthard and Marco Walker. Massimo Colomba is the Goalkeeper coach. Massimo Ceccaroni is head of the FCB Youth System.

Position	Staff
Manager	(Switzerland) Raphaël Wicky
Assistant manager	(Switzerland) Massimo Lombardo
Assistant manager & Fitness Coach	(Switzerland) Marco Walker
Goalkeeper Coach	(Switzerland) Massimo Colomba
Fitness Coach	(Germany) Werner Leuthard
Team leader	(Switzerland) Gustav Nussbaumer
Youth Team Coach	(Switzerland) Arjan Peço
Youth Team Co-Coach	(Switzerland) Toni Membrino
Youth Team Co-Coach	(Switzerland) Michaël Bauch

Source: FCB Official Site

=== Further information ===
The FC Basel annual general meeting took place on 9 June 2017. The previous board of directors under president Bernhard Heusler with sportdirector Georg Heitz, vice-president Adrian Knup, financial manager Stephan Werthmüller and marketing manager René Kamm stepped back. Reto Baumgartner, Dominik Donzé and Benno Kaiser remained on the board. Bernhard Burgener took over as chairman and Marco Streller as sportdirector. Peter von Büren was voted as financial manager and Patrick Jost in marketing.

Chairman	(Switzerland) Bernhard Burgener
Vice Chairman	(Switzerland)
Finances	(Switzerland) Peter von Büren
Sportdirector	(Switzerland) Marco Streller
Marketing	(Switzerland) Patrick Jost
Direktor	(Switzerland) Reto Baumgartner
Direktor	(Switzerland) Dominik Donzé
Direktor	(Switzerland) Benno Kaiser
Ground (capacity and dimensions)	St. Jakob-Park (38,512 (37,500 for international matches) / 120x80 m)

Updated to match played 10 June 2017
Source: FCB Official Site

== Overview ==
=== Offseason and preseason ===
At the end of the 2016–17 FC Basel season Marc Janko left the club and joined Czech First League club Sparta Prague. Daniel Høegh also left the club and joined SC Heerenveen of the Dutch Eredivisie On 23 June 2017 Basel announced that Jean-Paul Boëtius had been transferred to Dutch club Feyenoord. Seydou Doumbia's loan came to an end and Basel neither wanted to prolong nor enter the option to buy him. Adama Traoré left the club mid-August because he no longer played a part in the teams planning.

In the other direction Basel were not too busy on the transfer market. On 14 June 2017 Basel announced that they had signed Ricky van Wolfswinkel from SBV Vitesse. A few days later, on 20 June, the club announced that they had loaned Dimitri Oberlin from Red Bull Salzburg.

=== First half of season ===
During the season, on 13 September 2017 Basel announced that they had recalled striker Cedric Itten from the loan to Luzern. Then following the injury suffered by Ricky van Wolfswinkel Basel were forced to hire another striker and on 2 October 2017 they announced that Albian Ajeti had been signed a five-year contract.

=== Mid-season break ===
During the winter mid-season break there was also quite some movements on the transfer market. On 23 December 2017 FC Basel announced that Fabian Frei would return to the club, signing a four-and-a-half-year contract dated up until June 2022. On 27 December the club announced that Samuele Campo, a former Basel youth player, was also returning, signing a four-and-a-half-year contract dated up until June 2022. Furthermore, on 10 January 2018 the club announced that another former Basel player Valentin Stocker was also returning. Stocker signed a three-and-a-half-year contract dated up until June 2021.

In the other direction, also on 10 January, Basel announced that Renato Steffen had left the club. Steffen signed a three-and-a-half-year deal with VfL Wolfsburg. The transfer fee was reported as being 1.75 million Euro. Just a few days later Basel announced that Akanji had transferred to Borussia Dortmund. The transfer fee was reported as being 21.5 million Euro. He signed a four-and-a-half-year contract dated until June 2022.

== The Campaign ==
=== Domestic League ===
The season started on the weekend of 22–23 July 2017. Basel's priority aim for the new season is to win the league championship for the ninth consecutive time. Their first game was the match against Young Boys in Stade de Suisse which ended in a 0–2 defeat. Following three victories Basel played four games without a win (two draws, two defeats) and slipped down to fourth position in the league table. Following this poor start the following game was at home against Zürich. The game was a passionate battle and the home club titled their report: A passionately fighting FCB wins against FCZ 1:0. The game changed the run of the season and afterwards the team won seven and drawing three of the next ten games. The first game of the second half of the season was the last game of the kalender year and is included in these figures. By the mid-season break Basel had narrowed the gap to table leaders Young Boys to just two points, third placed Zürich were twelve points adrift.

After the winter break Basel could not find to their good form that they had before the break. They lost three of their first four games, at home against Lugano and St. Gallen and away against Luzern. The gap to leading Young Boys grew and was no longer reversible. The 5–1 win against Young Boys was achieved in the third last game of the season, but came after the championship had mathematically already been decided.

=== Domestic Cup ===
Basel are the Swiss Cup holders. Basel's clear aim for the cup is to defend their title. The first round of the Swiss Cup started on 13 August 2017. In the first three rounds Basel were drawn away against lower-tier teams, winning against FC Wettswil-Bonstetten, FC Chiasso and FC Rapperswil-Jona. Basel were then drawn at home against Luzern in the quarter-final. This was won 2–1 and Basel advance to the semi-final in the Stade de Suisse against Young Boys on 27 February 2018.

=== Champions League ===
Basel entered into this season's Champions League in the Group stage. They were drawn into Group A along with Manchester United, Benfica and CSKA Moscow. Basels initial aim is to remain in a European competition after the Champions League group stage. The first match was the away game against Manchester United. Basel were previously drawn with both Benfica and United in 2011–12 and on this occasion, United finished third in the group and dropped down to the UEFA Europa League.

Manchester United (12 September 2017)

The first game was played in Old Trafford, in proper Manchester weather in Manchester. Basel were sitting deep, with their three centre-backs, as United took control of the game from the very start. Marouane Fellaini came off the bench after 19 minutes to replace the injured Paul Pogba and opened the scoring with a powerful header in the 35 minute, which was only part of his Man of the Match performance. Basel played better after the opening goal and even at the beginning of the second half created their chances. But it was also a particularly special night for Romelu Lukaku and Marcus Rashford, both of whom found the net on their Champions League debuts with second-half strikes. United took a corner short, Daley Blind to Juan Mata and when Blind took the return he crossed for Lukaku who outjumped Balanta to power home. in the 85 minute Fellaini crossed, the ball was missed by Mkhitaryan and Suchý before Rashford, opening his body, sidefooted into the ground and high into the net.

Benfica (27 September 2017)

Basel ran out 5–0 victors at St. Jakob-Park in Basel against Portuguese side Benfica on Wednesday 27 September in an emphatic and much-needed victory for the Swiss club in the Champions League. Basel controlled the game from the start, Michael Lang (2) and Dimitri Oberlin (20) gave Basel a two-goal lead in the first half. Oberlin showed his amazing speed as he scored this goal. He made a clearance from a Benfica corner before covering the length of the pitch in mere seconds. Impressively, the 20-year-old composed himself after the run upon receiving the pass from Renato Steffen before sending the ball past the goalkeeper Júlio César. Ricky van Wolfswinkel then added a third in the second half (60) with a penalty, before birthday-boy Oberlin scored his second (69) and Blas Riveros's goal in the 76 minute completed the rout. Benfica were reduced to 10-men when André Almeida was sent off for foul play in the 63 minute.

CSKA Moscow (18 October 2017)

Match three of the Group Stage took Basel to the away game in the VEB Arena against CSKA Moscow. The game started slowly, the teams getting to know each other, indeed both teams looked very cautious in the beginning. But Basel took control after about ten minutes. Taulant Xhaka missed his first chance, but in the 29 minute he scored his first European goal in his 47th European match. The Albanian international cruised through the CSKA defence and shot the ball into the back of the net, a right footed shot from outside the box to the bottom left corner. There was little reaction from CSKA players after conceding. Quite the contrary – the visitors grew in confidence and took more control. At the end of an energetic first half, the visitors had the majority of the possession. The hosts matched the energy of the Swiss side, but had not been able to make more than one attempt on goal (off target). It was a deserved lead at half-time and Basel looked the more dangerous in the second half. Ten minutes into the second half the assistant referee canceled out Basel's second goal for offside, after referee Björn Kuipers initially pointed to the centre circle. The decision came about 40 seconds after the visitors started their celebrations. Towards the end of the game Basel made themselves good chances. Dimitri Oberlin missed the target on two occasions, until eventually in the 90 minute he didn't miss. The Switzerland U21 international made his run from the halfway line and finished with composure, slotting it calmly in the corner of goal.

== Players ==
=== First team squad ===
The following is the list of the Basel first team squad. It also includes players that were in the squad the day the season started on 22 July 2017 but subsequently left the club after that date.

As of 2 October 2017

Note: Flags indicate national team as defined under FIFA eligibility rules; some limited exceptions apply. Players may hold more than one non-FIFA nationality.

No.	Pos.	Nation	Player
1	GK	CZE	Tomáš Vaclík
3	DF	CIV	Adama Traoré
4	DF	EGY	Omar Gaber
5	DF	SUI	Michael Lang (Vice-Captain)
6	MF	SUI	Fabian Frei
7	MF	SUI	Luca Zuffi
9	FW	NED	Ricky van Wolfswinkel
10	MF	SUI	Samuele Campo
11	MF	SUI	Renato Steffen
13	GK	SUI	Mirko Salvi
14	MF	SUI	Valentin Stocker
15	MF	SWE	Alexander Fransson
17	DF	CZE	Marek Suchý (Captain)
18	GK	SUI	Germano Vailati
19	FW	SUI	Dimitri Oberlin
20	MF	CIV	Serey Dié

No.	Pos.	Nation	Player
22	MF	SUI	Albian Ajeti
23	DF	COL	Éder Álvarez Balanta
24	MF	NOR	Mohamed Elyounoussi
25	DF	PAR	Blás Riveros
27	FW	SUI	Neftali Manzambi
28	DF	ITA	Raoul Petretta
30	FW	SUI	Cedric Itten
31	MF	SUI	Dominik Robin Schmid
33	MF	SUI	Kevin Bua
34	MF	ALB	Taulant Xhaka (Vice-Captain)
35	DF	POR	Pedro Pacheco
36	DF	SUI	Manuel Akanji
37	FW	FRA	Afimico Pululu
39	MF	SUI	Davide Callà
-	MF	ARG	Matías Delgado
-	GK	SRB	Đorđe Nikolić
-	MF	SUI	Dereck Kutesa

=== Loans ===
==== In on loan ====
19	FW	SUI	Dimitri Oberlin (on loan from Red Bull Salzburg until 30 June 2018)

==== Out on loan ====
22	MF	SRB	Zdravko Kuzmanović (on loan at Málaga until 30 June 2018)
–	DF	SUI	Eray Cümart (on loan at Sion 30 June 2018)
20	MF	SUI	Dereck Kutesa (on loan to Luzern from 14 September until 30 June 2018)
30	FW	SUI	Cedric Itten (on loan at Luzern (ended early, on 13 September 2017))
-	FW	SLO	Andraž Šporar (on loan to Arminia Bielefeld until 30 June 2018)
–	MF	SUI	Robin Huser (on loan at FC Winterthur until 30 June 2018)
–	GK	SRB	Đorđe Nikolić (on loan to Schaffhausen until 30 June 2018)

=== Transfers summer 2017 ===
==== In ====
9	FW	NED	Ricky van Wolfswinkel (from SBV Vitesse)
13	GK	SUI	Mirko Salvi (return from Lugano end of loan)

==== Out ====
--	MF	SRB	Veljko Simić (released)
--	FW	SUI	Nicolas Hunziker (to Thun)
3	DF	CIV	Adama Traoré (to Göztepe S.K.)
10	MF	ARG	Matías Delgado (retired)
21	FW	AUT	Marc Janko (to Sparta Prague)
26	DF	DEN	Daniel Høegh (to SC Heerenveen)
77	FW	NED	Jean-Paul Boëtius (to Feyenoord)
88	FW	CIV	Seydou Doumbia (end of loan)

=== Transfers winter 2017–18 ===
==== In ====
3	DF	SUI	Léo Lacroix (from AS Saint-Étienne on loan)
6	MF	SUI	Fabian Frei (from Mainz 05)
10	MF	SUI	Samuele Campo (from Lausanne-Sport)
14	MF	SUI	Valentin Stocker (from Hertha BSC)

==== Out ====
11	MF	SUI	Renato Steffen (to VfL Wolfsburg)
36	DF	SUI	Manuel Akanji (to Borussia Dortmund)

== Results and fixtures ==
Kickoff times are in CET

=== Legend ===
Win Draw Loss Postponed

=== Friendly matches ===
==== Pre- and mid-season ====
30 June 2017 Pre-season	Basel	4–1	Rosenheim	Sportplatz Birkenmoos, Rottach-Egern
18:30	Schmid 18' (1:0); Balanta (yellow card) 47'; Steffen 57' (2:1) van Wolfswinkel 59' (3:1) van Wolfswinkel 89' (4:1)	FCB summary	55' (2:1) Valentin Hauswirth	Attendance: 120; Referee: Matthias Zacher

5 July 2017 Pre-season	Basel	0–0	Wil	Youth Campus Basel, Münchenstein
17:00		FCB summary		Attendance: 700; Referee: Fedayi San
Note: Fair gaame, no yellow cards

8 July 2017 Pre-season	Basel	2–0	Xamax	Youth Campus Basel, Münchenstein
11:00	Delgado 29' (1:0); Kutesa (yellow card) 37'; Bua 73' (2:0)	FCB summary	(yellow card) 25' Di Nardo	Attendance: 900; Referee: Adrien Jaccotet

12 July 2017 Pre-season	Basel	3–2	Athletic Club Bilbao	Stade du Christ-Roi, Lens, Switzerland
19:00	Delgado 29' (pen. 1:0) van Wolfswinkel 60' (2:2); Pululu 84' (3:2)	FCB summary	(yellow card) 28' Balenziaga; 40' (1:1) Merino; 48' (1:2) Kike Sola	Attendance: 1,050; Referee: Sascha Amhof

15 July 2017 Pre-season	Basel	3–2	Sporting CP	Centre Sportif, Delley-Portalban
19:00	Delgado 34' (pen. 1:1); Delgado (yellow card) 37'; Steffen 43' (2:1); Bua 79' (3:2)	FCB summary	28' (pen. 0:1) Dost; (yellow card) 39' Ruiz; 77' (2:2) Pereira	Attendance: 3,500; Referee: Alain Bieri (Solothurn)

30 August 2017 Mid-season	Basel	6–1	Wohlen	Youth Campus Basel, Münchenstein
11:00	van Wolfswinkel 3' (1:0); Steffen 13' (2:0) van Wolfswinkel 36' (3:1); Zuffi 41' (4:1); Steffen 43' (5:1); Pululu 56' (6:1); Adamczyk (yellow card) 64'	FCB summary	16' (2:1) Marko Bicvic; (yellow card) 51' Sadrijaj	Attendance: 350; Referee: (Switzerland) Adrien Jaccottet (Basel)

4 October 2017 Mid-season	Basel	1–2	Schaffhausen	Youth Campus Basel, Münchenstein
11:00	Okafor 4' (1:0)	FCB summary	14' (1:1) Dangubic; 27' (1:2) Tranquilli	Attendance: 300; Referee: Tomas Superczynsk
Note: Fair game, no yellow cards

==== Winter break ====
14 January 2018 Training camp	Basel	1–1	Tianjin Quanjian	Marbella Football Center, San Pedro de Alcántara
16:00	Okafor 31' (1:0)	FCB summary	44' (1:1) Zheng Dalun	Attendance: 200; Referee: Jose Maria Aranda Delgado
Note: Fair game, no yellow cards

17 January 2018 Training camp	Basel	1–2	Viktoria Plzeň	Marbella Football Center, San Pedro de Alcántara
16:00	Bua 17' (1:0)	FCB summary	49' (pen. 1:1) Bakoš; 56' (1:2) Čermák	Attendance: 50; Referee: Juan Gabriel Gallegos Gimenez
Note: Fair game, no yellow cards

20 January 2018 Training camp	Basel	2–4	SK Sturm Graz	Marbella Football Center, San Pedro de Alcántara
16:00	Elyounoussi 43' (1:3); Elyounoussi 45' (2:3); Balanta (yellow card) 58'; Serey Die (yellow card) 90'	FCB summary	5' (0:1) Koch; 30' (0:2) Alar; 41' (0:3) Huspek; 56' (2:4) Lovrić	Attendance: 60; Referee: Sergio Gutierez Perez

24 January 2018 Winter break	Basel	1–0	Winterthur	Youth Campus Basel, Münchenstein
11:00	van Wolfswinkel 55' (1:0)	FCB summary		Attendance: 300; Referee: Lukas Fähndrich
Note: Fair game, no yellow cards

27 January 2018 Winter break	Basel	1–0	Luzern	St. Jakob Stadium, Basel
13:30	Al. Ajeti 62' (1:0)	FCB summary		Attendance: 3,290; Referee: Adrien Jaccottet (Basel)
Note: Fair game, no yellow cards

=== Swiss Super League ===
==== First half of season ====
22 July 2017 Round 1	Young Boys	2–0	Basel	Stade de Suisse, Bern
19:00	Hoarau (yellow card) 16'; Nuhu (yellow card) 53'; Ravet 58' (1:0); Sanago (yellow card) 79'; Sulejmani 80' (2:0)	FCB summary	(yellow card) 4' Delgado; (yellow card) 32' Elyounoussi; (yellow card) 45' Suchý; (yellow card) 69' Lang; (yellow card) 79' Balanta; (yellow card) 90+2' Steffen	Attendance: 31,500 (sold out); Referee: (Switzerland) Stephan Klossner

30 July 2017 Round 2	Basel	3–1	Luzern	St. Jakob-Park, Basel
16:00	Elyounoussi 14' (1:0); Bua 22' (2:0); (yellow card) 33' Akanji van Wolfswinkel 79' (3:1)	FCB summary	(yellow card) 33' Kryeziu; (yellow card) 50' Custodio; 54' (o.g. 2:1) Elyounoussi; (yellow card) 68' Juric	Attendance: 27,416; Referee: (Switzerland) Fedayi San

5 August 2017 Round 3	Thun	0–3	Basel	Stockhorn Arena, Thun
19:00	Bürgy (yellow card) 66'	FCB summary	3' (0:1) van Wolfswinkel; 29' (0:2) Bua; (yellow card) 71' Steffen; (yellow card) 88' Vaclík; 90+6' (0:3) Oberlin	Attendance: 7,227; Referee: (Switzerland) Alain Bieri

10 August 2017 Round 4	Basel	3–2	Grasshopper Club	St. Jakob-Park, Basel
20:00	Vilotić 29' (o.g. 1:0) van Wolfswinkel 43' (2:0) van Wolfswinkel 60' (pen. 3:0); Balanta (yellow card) 84'	FCB summary	(yellow card) 59' Zesiger; 70' (3:1) Andersen (773:2) Vilotić; (yellow card) 75' Vilotić	Attendance: 26,317; Referee: (Switzerland) Nikolaj Hänni (Gams SG)

20 August 2017 Round 5	Basel	1–1	Lugano	St. Jakob-Park, Basel
16:00	van Wolfswinkel 62' (pen. 1:0)	FCB summary	(yellow card) 62' Piccinocchi; 86' (1:1) Carlinhos Júnior; (yellow card) 89' Mihajlović	Attendance: 26,994; Referee: (Switzerland) Adrien Jaccottet

27 August 2017 Round 6	Sion	1–1	Basel	Stade Tourbillon, Sion
16:00	Zock (yellow card) 19'; Matheus Cunha 47' (1:1); Schneuwly (yellow card) 89'	FCB summary	7' (0:1) van Wolfswinkel; (yellow card) 21' Steffen; (yellow card) 28' Suchý; (yellow card) 34' Xhaka	Attendance: 10,900; Referee: (Switzerland) Alain Bieri (Solothurn)

9 September 2017 Round 7	Basel	1–2	Lausanne-Sport	St. Jakob-Park, Basel
19:00	Wolfswinkel 30' (pen. 1:0); Suchy (yellow card) 53' (yellow-red card) 53'; Steffen (yellow card) 72'	FCB summary	(yellow card) 29' Maniere; 55' (1:1) Kololli; (yellow card) 32' (yellow-red card) 71' Getaz; 80' (1:2) Geissmann; (yellow card) 85' Maccoppi; (yellow card) 90+1' Monteiro; (yellow card) 90+3' Castella	Attendance: 23,686; Referee: (Switzerland) Pascal Erlachner

20 September 2017 Round 8	St. Gallen	2–1	Basel	Kybunpark, St. Gallen
19:00	Aratore 15' (1:0); Aleksić 25' (2:0); Aleksić (yellow card) 45'; Lüchinger (yellow card) 52'; Hefti (yellow card) 55'; Wiss (yellow card) 81'	FCB summary	(yellow card) 31' Xhaka; (yellow card) 89' Oberlin; 89' (2:1) Zuffi	Attendance: 12,214; Referee: (Switzerland) Stephan Klossner

23 September 2017 Round 9	Basel	1–0	Zürich	St. Jakob-Park, Basel
19:00	Oberlin 62' (1:0); Zuffi (yellow card) 71'; Lang (yellow card) 80'; Xhaka (yellow card) 90+1'	FCB summary	(yellow card) 41' Sarr	Attendance: 29,584; Referee: (Switzerland) Sandro Schärer Buttikon

30 September 2017 Round 10	Grasshopper Club	0–0	Basel	Letzigrund, Zürich
19:00	Bergström (yellow card) 9'	FCB summary	(yellow card) 33' Xhaka; (yellow card) 63' Akanji	Attendance: 10,300; Referee: (Switzerland) Alain Bieri (Solothurn)
Note: 26th minute Steffen injured and out of match

14 October 2017 Round 11	Lugano	0–4	Basel	Cornaredo, Lugano
19:00	Mariani (yellow card) 33'; Amuzie (yellow card) 85'	FCB summary	19' (0:1) Petretta; 39' (0:2) Al. Ajeti; 74' (0:3) Elyounoussi; 86' (0:4) Itten	Attendance: 3,627; Referee: (Switzerland) Pascal Erlachner

21 October 2017 Round 12	Basel	2–1	Thun	St. Jakob-Park, Basel
19:00	Zuffi 36' (1:0); Al. Ajeti 62' (2:0); Suchý (yellow card) 67'	FCB summary	(yellow card) 26' Hediger; 68' (pen. 2:1) Costanzo; (yellow card) 70' Kablan; (yellow card) 77' Tosetti	Attendance: 24,559; Referee: (Switzerland) Fedayi San (Gebenstorf)
Note: 8th minute; header Al. Ajeti against the post, 40th minute; shot Bua against the post, 55th minute shot Elyounoussi against the post

28 October 2017 Round 13	Zürich	0–0	Basel	Letzigrund, Zürich
19:00	Jagne (yellow card) 8'; Brunner (yellow card) 41'; Pálsson (yellow card) 61'; Bangura (yellow card) 82'	FCB summary Soccerway summary	(yellow card) 3' Suchý; (yellow card) 31' Xhaka; (yellow card) 53' Oberlin	Attendance: 15,023; Referee: (Switzerland) Stephan Klossner

5 November 2017 Round 14	Basel	1–1	Young Boys	St. Jakob-Park, Basel
16:00	Dié (yellow card) 54'; Dié 57' (1:0); Callà (yellow card) 78'	FCB summary Soccerway report	(yellow card) 40' Benito; (yellow card) 59'Nuhu; (yellow card) 65' Aebischer; 80' (1:1)Nsamé	Attendance: 32,456; Referee: (Switzerland) Sandro Schärer

18 November 2017 Round 15	Basel	5–1	Sion	St. Jakob-Park, Basel
19:00	Lang 56' (1:1); Elyounoussi 57' (2:1); Steffen 72' (pen. 3:1); Bua 76' (pen. 4:1)} Bua 90+2' (5:1)	FCB summary	3' (0:1) Schneuwly; (yellow card) 14' Uçan; (yellow card) 21' Angha; (yellow card) 53' (yellow-red card) 71' Bamert; (yellow card) 74' Mitryushkin; (yellow card) 78' Kasami	Attendance: 24,212; Referee: (Switzerland) Alain Bieri (Solothurn)

25 November 2017 Round 16	Luzern	1–4	Basel	Swissporarena, Luzern
19:00	Shkelqim Demhasaj 19' (1:0); Grether (yellow card) 52'; Ziegler (yellow card) 56'; Kryeziu (red card) 86'	FCB summary	30' (1:1) Lang; (yellow card) 50' Xhaka; 69' (1:2) Oberlin; 81' (1:3) Itten; 90+2' (1:4) Lang	Attendance: 10,109; Referee: (Switzerland) Adrien Jaccottet (Basel)

2 December 2017 Round 17	Lausanne-Sport	1–4	Basel	Olympique de la Pontaise, Lausanne
19:00	Maccoppi (yellow card) 55'; Zeqiri 79' (1:4)	FCB summary	7' (0:1) Elyounoussi; 39' (0:2) Al. Ajeti; 63' (0:3) Lang; 66' (0:4) Steffen	Attendance: 3,956; Referee: (Switzerland) Urs Schnyder

9 December 2017 Round 18	Basel	3–0	St. Gallen	St. Jakob-Park, Basel
19:00	Al. Ajeti 20' (1:0); Steffen (yellow card) 62'; Al. Ajeti 65' (2:0); Akanji 72' (3:0)	FCB summary	(yellow card) 28' Wiss; (yellow card) 67' Aratore	Attendance: 24,812; Referee: (Switzerland) Fedayi San (Gebenstorf)

==== Second half of season ====
17 December 2017 Round 19	Grasshopper Club	0–2	Basel	Letzigrund, Zürich
16:00	Qollaku (yellow card) 79'; Vilotić (yellow card) 88'	FCB summary	25' Elyounoussi; 59' (yellow card) 79' Steffen	Attendance: 7,800; Referee: (Switzerland) Stephan Klossner

4 February 2018 Round 20	Basel	0–1	Lugano	St. Jakob-Park, Basel
16:00	Elyounoussi (penalty missed) 27'; Suchý (yellow card) 45'; Xhaka (yellow card) 60'	FCB summary	6' Gerndt; (yellow card) 24' Rouiller; (yellow card) 60' Črnigoj	Attendance: 23,841; Referee: (Switzerland) Sandro Schärer Buttikon

10 February 2018 Round 21	Thun	0–2	Basel	Stockhorn Arena, Thun
19:00	Righetti (yellow card) 32'; Glarner (yellow card) 90+4'	FCB summary	42' Oberlin; (yellow card) 59' Petretta; 90' (yellow card) 88' Bua	Attendance: 5,607; Referee: (Switzerland) Lukas Fähndrich

17 February 2018 Round 22	Basel	0–2	St. Gallen	St. Jakob-Park, Basel
19:00	van Wolfswinkel (penalty missed) 24'; Serey Die (yellow card) 26'; Suchý (yellow card) 57'; Xhaka (yellow card) 90+1'	FCB summary	(yellow card) 23' Hefti; (yellow card) 52' Barnetta; 53', 86' Itten	Attendance: 22,988; Referee: (France) Jérôme Brisard

24 February 2018 Round 23	Lausanne-Sport	P–P	Basel	Olympique de la Pontaise, Lausanne
19:00				Referee: (Switzerland) Urs Schnyder

3 March 2018 Round 24	Basel	P–P	Zürich	St. Jakob-Park, Basel
19:00				Referee: (Switzerland) Nikolaj Hänni

11 March 2018 Round 25	Luzern	1–0	Basel	Swissporarena, Luzern
16:00	Knezevic (yellow card) 36'; Gvilia 46'; Kryeziu (yellow card) 74'	FCB summary	(yellow card) 21' Bua; (yellow card) 32' Riveros; (yellow card) 57' Suchý; (yellow card) 92' Al. Ajeti; (yellow card) 93' Oberlin	Attendance: 11,749; Referee: (Switzerland) Fedayi San (Gebenstorf)

14 March 2018 Round 23	Lausanne-Sport	1–1	Basel	Olympique de la Pontaise, Lausanne
18:45	Schmid (yellow card) 16'; Monteiro (yellow card) 76'; Enzo (yellow card) 84'; Rapp 89'	FCB summary	(yellow card) 40' Oberlin; 60' Lang; (yellow card) 88' Stocker; (yellow card) 89' Serey Die	Attendance: 3,159; Referee: (Switzerland) Pascal Erlachner

18 March 2018 Round 26	Basel	1–0	Sion	St. Jakob-Park, Basel
16:00	Al. Ajeti (yellow card) 46' (goal) 69'; Lacroix (yellow card) 87'	FCB summary	(yellow card) 79' Cunha	Attendance: 24,717; Referee: (Switzerland) Urs Schnyder

2 April 2018 Round 27	Young Boys	2–2	Basel	Stade de Suisse, Bern
16:00	Hoarau 24'; Nuhu (yellow card) 40'; Fassnacht 56'	FCB summary	(yellow card) 36' Stocker; 39' Xhaka; 47' Suchý; (yellow card) 50' Zuffi; (yellow card) 59' Elyounoussi	Attendance: 31,120 (sold out); Referee: (France) Frank Schneider (Strassburg)

7 April 2018 Round 28	Lugano	0–1	Basel	Cornaredo, Lugano
16:00	Rouiller (yellow card) 45'	FCB summary	18' Elyounoussi; (red card) 26' Suchý; (yellow card) 86' Xhaka; (yellow card) 90' Stocker	Attendance: 4,746; Referee: (Switzerland) Lionel Tschudi (Neuchâtel)

11 April 2018 Round 24	Basel	3–0	Zürich	St. Jakob-Park, Basel
18:45	Riveros 16'; Xhaka (yellow card) 66'; F. Frei (yellow card) 69'; Stocker 71'; Campo (yellow card) 79' van Wolfswinkel 84'; Petretta (yellow card) 90+2'	FCB summary	(yellow card) 61' Nef; (yellow card) 73' Schättin	Attendance: 27,137; Referee: (Switzerland) Stephan Klossner

15 April 2018 Round 29	Basel	2–1	Lausanne-Sport	St. Jakob-Park, Basel
16:00	Bua 11'; (yellow card) 60'; Al. Ajeti 90+2'	FCB summary	(yellow card) 24' Loosli; (yellow card) 55' (yellow-red card) 82' Gétaz; 63' Margiotta; (yellow card) 90' Castella	Attendance: 23,649; Referee: (Switzerland) Lukas Fähndrich

18 April 2018 Round 30	Basel	1–0	Grasshopper Club	St. Jakob-Park, Basel
20:00	Stocker (yellow card) 43'; Bua (yellow card) 58'; Elyounoussi 75'; Manzambi (yellow card) 83'	FCB summary	(yellow card) 28' Bergström; (yellow card) 45' Doumbia	Attendance: 23,487; Referee: (Switzerland) Pascal Erlachner

22 April 2018 Round 31	Sion	2–2	Basel	Stade Tourbillon, Sion
16:00	Carlitos 42' (pen.); Kasami (yellow card) 44'; Cunha 47'	FCB summary	11', 52' van Wolfswinkel; (yellow card) 18' Campo; (yellow card) 60' Lacroix; (yellow card) 63' Lang; (yellow card) 78' F. Frei	Attendance: 12,800; Referee: (Switzerland) Stephan Klossner

29 April 2018 Round 32	Basel	6–1	Thun	St. Jakob-Park, Basel
16:00	Stocker 7'; Campo 13'; Manzambi 47' van Wolfswinkel (yellow card) 49' (goal) 57'; Al. Ajeti 75', 86'	FCB summary	40' Sorgić; (yellow card) 58' Gelmi	Attendance: 25,229; Referee: (Switzerland) Sandro Schärer (Buttikon)

6 May 2018 Round 33	St. Gallen	2–4	Basel	Kybunpark, St. Gallen
16:00	Buess 8'; Sigurjónsson 61'; Wittwer (yellow card) 74'; Toko (yellow card) 76'	FCB summary	(yellow card) 30' Serey Die; 43', 58' (yellow card) 65' Elyounoussi; 70' Campo; 87' Al. Ajeti	Attendance: 15,594; Referee: (Switzerland) Fedayi San (Gebenstorf)

10 May 2018 Round 34	Basel	5–1	Young Boys	St. Jakob-Park, Basel
16:00	Elyounoussi 2'; Ajeti 26'; Stocker (yellow card) 31'; Zuffi 54'; Ajeti 79'; Oberlin 87'	FCB summary	(yellow card) 78' Benito; (yellow card) 84' Nsame; 89' Fassnacht	Attendance: 29,121; Referee: (Switzerland) Urs Schnyder

13 May 2018 Round 35	Zürich	4–1	Basel	Letzigrund, Zürich
16:00	Brunner (yellow card) 44'; Dwamena 49'; Pa Modou 62'; Frey; Marchesano 90+1'	FCB summary	(yellow card) 45' Balanta; 90+3' Al. Ajeti	Attendance: 11,135; Referee: (Switzerland) Nikolaj Hänni (Gams SG)

19 May 2018 Round 36	Basel	2–2	Luzern	St. Jakob-Park, Basel
19:00	Elyounoussi 17'; Frei (yellow card) 27'; Al. Ajeti 82'	FCB summary	9' Schulz; 85' Schürpf	Attendance: 25,161; Referee: (Switzerland) Fedayi San (Gebenstorf)

==== League table ====
Pos	Team	Pld	W	D	L	GF	GA	GD	Pts	Qualification or relegation
1	Young Boys (C)	36	26	6	4	84	41	+43	84	Qualification for the Champions League play-off round
2	Basel	36	20	9	7	72	36	+36	69	Qualification for the Champions League second qualifying round
3	Luzern	36	15	9	12	51	51	0	54	Qualification for the Europa League third qualifying round
4	Zürich	36	12	13	11	50	44	+6	49	Qualification for the Europa League group stage (Note: Zürich qualified for the Europa League group stage by winning the 2017–18 Swiss Cup.)
5	St. Gallen	36	14	3	19	52	72	−20	45	Qualification for the Europa League second qualifying round

Source: Swiss Super League
Rules for classification: 1) Points; 2) Goal difference; 3) Goals scored; 4) Head-to-head goal difference; 5) Away goals scored; 6) Draw.
(C) Champions

=== Swiss Cup ===
The draw for the first round was held on 28 June 2017. The Super- and Challenge League clubs were seeded and could not be drawn against each other. The lower division teams were granted home advantage and Basel were therefore drawn away. The home advantage was also granted to the team from the lower league in the second and third rounds.

13 August 2017 Round 1	FC Wettswil-Bonstetten	0–2	Basel	Sportanlage Moos, Wettswil am Albis
14:30	Studer (yellow card) 61'; Schneebeli (yellow card) 83'	FCB summary ASF/SFV summary	(yellow card) 37' Callà; 38' (0:1) Xhaka; 86' (0:2) Zuffi	Attendance: 4,257 (sold out) Stadium record Referee: (Switzerland) Sandro Schärer Buttikon

17 September 2017 Round 2	Chiasso	0–1	Basel	Stadio Comunale (Chiasso)
16:00	Krasniqi (yellow card) 25'; Abedini (yellow card) 30'; Said (yellow card) 49'; Simone Belometti (yellow card) 49'	FCB summary ASF/SFV summary	(yellow card) 20' Suchý; 82' (0:1) Itten	Attendance: 1,470; Referee: (Switzerland) Nikolaj Hänni (Gams SG)

25 October 2017 Round 3	Rapperswil-Jona	1–2	Basel	Stadion Grünfeld, Rapperswil
20:00	da Silva 32' (1:0); Berkay Sülüngöz (yellow card) 34'; Schwizer (yellow card) 53'	FCB summary ASF/SFV summary	35' (1:1) Akanji; 59' (1:2) Oberlin	Attendance: 3,904; Referee: (Switzerland) Sandro Schärer Buttikon

29 November 2017 Quarter-final	Basel	2–1	FC Luzern	St. Jakob-Park, Basel
19:30	Lang 13' (1:0); Elyounoussi (yellow card) 41'; Lang 52' (2:1)	FCB summary ASF/SFV summary	22' (1:1) Schürpf; (yellow card) 41' Sidler; (yellow card) 60' Voca; (yellow card) 77' Schulz	Attendance: 7,715; Referee: (Switzerland) Sandro Schärer Buttikon

27 February 2018 Semi-final	Young Boys	2–0	Basel	Stade de Suisse, Bern
20:15	Hoarau 55' (pen. 1:0); Suchý 65' (o.g. 2:0)	FCB summary ASF/SFV summary		Attendance: 23,519; Referee: (Switzerland) Stephan Klossner

=== UEFA Champions League ===
==== Group stage ====
Basel were qualified for the 2017–18 UEFA Champions League in the Group stage. The draw was held on 24 August 2017, at the Grimaldi Forum in Monaco. Basel were drawn into Group A along with Manchester United, Benfica and CSKA Moscow. The first match was the away game against Manchester United.

Matches

12 September 2017 Round 1	Manchester United (England)	3–0	(Switzerland) Basel	Old Trafford, Manchester
20:45	Fellaini 35' (1:0); Young (yellow card) 38'; Lukaku 53' (2:0); Blind (yellow card) 58'; Rashford 84' (3:0)	FCB summary UEFA summary	(yellow card) 28' Balanta; (yellow card) 61' Lang; (yellow card) 82' Xhaka	Attendance: 73,854; Referee: (France) Ruddy Buquet

27 September 2017 Round 2	Basel (Switzerland)	5–0	(Portugal) Benfica	St. Jakob-Park, Basel
20:45	Lang 2' (1:0); Oberlin 20' (2:0); Akanji (yellow card) 45+1'; Petretta (yellow card) 50'; Xhaka (yellow card) 59'; Van Wolfswinkel 60' (pen. 3:0); Oberlin 69' (4:0); Riveros 76' (5:0)	FCB summary UEFA report	(yellow card) 55' Živković; (yellow card) 59' Salvio; (red card) 63' André Almeida	Attendance: 34,111; Referee: Craig Thomson (Scotland)

18 October 2017 Round 3	CSKA Moscow (Russia)	0–2	(Switzerland) Basel	VEB Arena, Moscow
20:45	Natkho (yellow card) 70'	FCB summary UEFA report	29' (0:1) T. Xhaka (90+3 0:2) D. Oberlin	Attendance: 27,996; Referee: Björn Kuipers (Netherlands)

31 October 2017 Round 4	Basel (Switzerland)	1–2	(Russia) CSKA Moscow	St. Jakob-Park, Basel
20:45	Zuffi 32' (1:0); Xhaka (yellow card) 60'; Balanta (yellow card) 74'	FCB summary UEFA report	(yellow card) 49' Natkho; 65' (1:1) Dzagoev; 79' (1:2) Wernbloom; (yellow card) 84' Fernandes	Attendance: 33,033; Referee: Milorad Mažić (Serbia)

22 November 2017 Round 5	Basel (Switzerland)	1–0	(England) Manchester United	St. Jakob-Park, Basel
20:45	Lang 89' (1:0)	FCB summary UEFA report	(yellow card) 83' Darmian	Attendance: 36,000 (sold out); Referee: Daniele Orsato (Italy)

5 December 2017 Round 6	Benfica (Portugal)	0–2	(Switzerland) Basel	Estádio da Luz, Lisbon
20:45	Samaris (yellow card) 68'	FCB summary UEFA report	5' (0:1) Elyounoussi; (yellow card) 9' Xhaka; (yellow card) 63' Akanji; 65' (0:2) Oberlin; (yellow card) 75' Petretta	Attendance: 22,470; Referee: Jesús Gil Manzano (Spain)

Group table

Pos	Team	Pld	W	D	L	GF	GA	GD	Pts	Qualification	MUN	BSL	CSKA	BEN
1	(England) Manchester United	6	5	0	1	12	3	+9	15	Advance to knockout phase	—	3–0	2–1	2–0
2	(Switzerland) Basel	6	4	0	2	11	5	+6	12	Advance to knockout phase	1–0	—	1–2	5–0
3	(Russia) CSKA Moscow	6	3	0	3	8	10	−2	9	Transfer to Europa League	1–4	0–2	—	2–0
4	(Portugal) Benfica	6	0	0	6	1	14	−13	0		0–1	0–2	1–2	—

Source: UEFA

==== Knockout phase ====
Round of 16

13 February 2018 First leg	Basel (Switzerland)	0–4	(England) Manchester City	Basel, Switzerland
20:45 CET	Xhaka (yellow card) 38'; Serey Die (yellow card) 89'	FCB summary UEFA report	14' (0:1) Gündoğan; 18' (0:2) B. Silva; 23' (0:3) Agüero; 53' (0:4) Gündoğan; (yellow card) 59' Fernandinho; (yellow card) 89' Gündoğan	Stadium: St. Jakob-Park; Attendance: 36,000; Referee: Jonas Eriksson (Sweden)

7 March 2018 Second leg	Manchester City (England)	1–2 (5–2 agg.)	(Switzerland) Basel	Manchester, England
20:45 CET	Jesus 8' (1:0); Jesus (yellow card) 77'	FCB summary UEFA Report	17' (1:1) Elyounoussi; (yellow card) 44' Lacroix; 71' (1:2) Lang	Stadium: Etihad Stadium; Attendance: 49,411; Referee: (Czech Republic) Pavel Královec (Czech Republic)

== See also ==
- History of FC Basel
- List of FC Basel players
- List of FC Basel seasons

== Sources ==
- Rotblau: Jahrbuch Saison 2017/2018. Publisher: FC Basel Marketing AG. ISBN 978-3-7245-2189-1
- Die ersten 125 Jahre / 2018. Publisher: Josef Zindel im Friedrich Reinhardt Verlag, Basel. ISBN 978-3-7245-2305-5
- Season 2017–18 at "Basler Fussballarchiv” homepage
- Switzerland 2017–18 at RSSSF
