= Kevin Bua =

Swiss footballer (born 1993)

Personal information
- Date of birth: 11 August 1993 (age 33)
- Place of birth: Geneva, Switzerland
- Height: 1.80 m (5 ft 11 in)
- Position: Winger

Team information
- Current team: Plan-les-Ouates

Youth career
- –2013: Servette

Senior career*
Years	Team	Apps	(Gls)
2013–2015	Servette	51	(6)
2015–2016	Zürich	30	(6)
2016–2020	Basel	70	(14)
2020–2021	Leganés	22	(4)
2021–2025	Sion	94	(9)
2025–2026	Étoile Carouge	21	(4)
2026–	Plan-les-Ouates		

International career
2013–2014	Switzerland U20	3	(1)
- * Club domestic league appearances and goals as of 26 May 2026

Kevin Bua (born 11 August 1993) is a Swiss professional footballer who plays as a winger for an amateur side FC Plan-les-Ouates.

== Club career ==
=== Servette and Zürich ===
Bua began to play youth football with Servette. He signed his first professional contract 2013. In summer 2015 he moved to Zürich.

=== Basel ===
On 8 July 2016, Basel announced that they had signed Bua on a four-year deal dated up unto 30 June 2020. He joined Basel's first team for their 2016–17 season under head coach Urs Fischer. After playing in two test games Bua played his first team debut for the club in the Swiss Cup away game in the Herti Allmend Stadion on 18 September 2016 as Basel won 1–0 against Zug 94. He played his domestic league debut for the club in the home game in the St. Jakob-Park on 1 October as Basel played a 1–1 draw with Thun. Under trainer Urs Fischer Bua won the Swiss Super League championship at the end of the 2016–17 Super League season. For the club this was the eighth title in a row and their 20th championship title in total. They also won the Swiss Cup for the twelfth time, which meant they had won the double for the sixth time in the club's history.

In their following 2017–18 season under new head coach Raphaël Wicky Bua received more playing time. He scored his first goal for his club in the home game on 30 July 2017 as Basel won 3–1 against Luzern.

Under trainer Marcel Koller Basel won the Swiss Cup in the 2018–19 season. In the first round Basel beat Montlingen 3–0, in the second round Echallens Région 7–2 and in the round of 16 Winterthur 1–0. In the quarter-finals Sion were defeated 4–2 after extra time and in the semi-finals Zürich were defeated 3–1. All these games were played away from home. The final was held on the 19 May 2019 in the Stade de Suisse Wankdorf Bern against Thun. Albian Ajeti scored the first goal, Fabian Frei the second for Basel, then Dejan Sorgić netted a goal for Thun, but the result was 2–1 for Basel. Bua played in five cup games and scored two goals in the match against Echallens.

During his stay with the club Bua netted one hat-trick, this was in the 2019–20 Swiss Cup first round match, on 17 August 2019, away from home against amateur club Pully Football FC. Bua stayed with the club for four season and during this time he played a total of 135 games for Basel scoring a total of 28 goals. 70 of these games were in the Swiss Super League, 14 in the Swiss Cup, 18 in the UEFA competitions (Champions League and Europa League) and 33 were friendly games. He scored 14 goal in the domestic league, five in the cup, three in the Europa League and the other six were scored during the test games.

=== Leganés ===
On 19 September 2020, Bua moved abroad and signed a one-year contract with CD Leganés of the Spanish Segunda División.

=== Sion ===
On 11 July 2021, he signed a three-year contract with Sion.

== International career ==
Bua was born in Switzerland, he is Spanish descent through his father and mother. He is a former youth international for Switzerland.

== Career statistics ==
=== Club ===
As of match played 13 September 2024

Appearances and goals by club, season and competition
Club	Season	League			National cup		Continental		Other		Total	
Club	Season	Division	Apps	Goals	Apps	Goals	Apps	Goals	Apps	Goals	Apps	Goals
Servette	2013-14	Swiss Challenge League	21	1	1	0	—		—		22	1
Servette	2014-15	Swiss Challenge League	30	5	1	0	—		—		31	5
Servette	Total		51	6	2	0	—		—		53	6
Zürich	2015-16	Swiss Super League	30	6	4	2	—		—		34	8
Basel	2016-17	Swiss Super League	3	0	2	0	0	0	—		5	0
Basel	2017-18	Swiss Super League	27	6	3	0	5 (Note: Appearance(s) in UEFA Champions League)	0	—		35	6
Basel	2018-19	Swiss Super League	21	4	4	1	6 (Note: Two appearances in UEFA Champions League, Four appearances in UEFA Europa League)	0	—		31	5
Basel	2019-20	Swiss Super League	19	4	3	0	7 (Note: Two appearances in UEFA Champions League, Five appearances, three goals in UEFA Europa League)	3	—		29	7
Basel	Total		70	14	12	1	18	3	—		100	18
Leganés	2020-21	Segunda División	22	4	3	1	—		—		25	5
Sion	2021-22	Swiss Super League	25	1	1	0	—		—		26	1
Sion	2022-23	Swiss Super League	28	1	2	0	—		2 (Note: Appearance(s) in Promotion/Relegation play-offs)	0	32	1
Sion	2023-24	Swiss Challenge League	24	5	2	0	—		—		26	5
Sion	2024-25	Swiss Super League	6	1	1	1	—		—		7	2
Sion	Total		83	8	6	1	—		2	0	91	9
Career Total			256	38	27	5	18	3	2	0	303	46

== Honours ==
Basel

- Swiss Super League: 2016–17
- Swiss Cup: 2016–17, 2018–19
