= Samuele Campo =

Swiss footballer (born 1995)

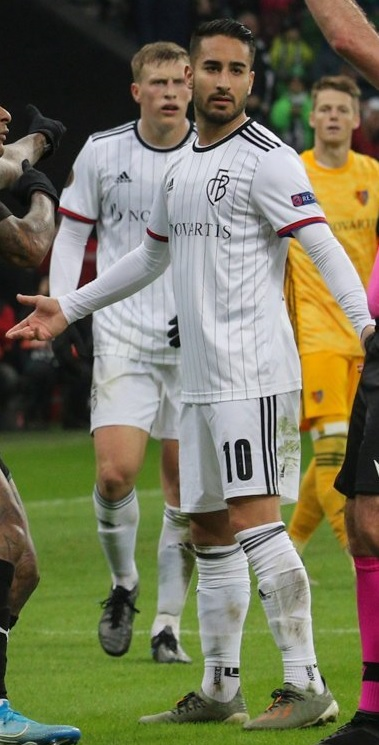
- Campo with FC Basel in 2019

Personal information
- Full name: Samuele Campo
- Date of birth: 6 July 1995 (age 31)
- Place of birth: Basel, Switzerland
- Height: 1.77 m (5 ft 10 in)
- Position: Midfielder

Youth career
- 2002–2015: Basel

Senior career*
| Years | Team | Apps | (Gls) |
| 2012–2015 | Basel | 54 | (13) |
| 2016–2018 | Lausanne-Sport | 57 | (11) |
| 2018–2021 | Basel | 61 | (15) |
| 2021 | → Darmstadt 98 (loan) | 2 | (0) |
| 2021–2024 | Luzern | 32 | (1) |

International career^{‡}
| 2011 | Switzerland U16 | 2 | (0) |
| 2013 | Switzerland U18 | 3 | (2) |
| 2013–2014 | Switzerland U19 | 6 | (1) |
| 2015 | Switzerland U20 | 3 | (0) |
| 2016 | Switzerland U21 | 1 | (0) |
- * Club domestic league appearances and goals as of 21 May 2024 ‡ National team caps and goals as of 7 October 2016

Samuele Campo (born 6 July 1995) is a Swiss professional footballer who plays as a midfielder.

== Club career ==
=== Youth football ===
Campo, son of a Swiss mother and an Italian father grew up in the Hirzbrunnen quarter of Kleinbasel (Lesser Basel). He joined FC Basel as six-year-old in 2002 and played his entire youth football at the club, advancing to their U-21 team during the 2012/13 season. For the U-21 team he played 54 games scoring 13 goals. During this period, he had three appearances in test matches for the first team. In the winter break of the 2015–16 Swiss Super League season he left Basel and joined FC Lausanne-Sport.

=== Lausanne-Sport ===
FC Lausanne-Sport, with head coach Fabio Celestini, at that time played in the Challenge League, the second tier of Swiss football. Campo made his professional debut with his new club on 31 July 2016 as they played a 4–4 draw with FC Thun. At the end of the 2015–16 Challenge League season Lausanne won the league and secured promotion to the Swiss Super League. The attacking midfielder then established himself in the top division in the following season 2016/2017, scoring six goals and just as many assists. In the next season, the player matured into a top performer within Lausanne's ranks and scored four goals and eight assists in the 19 league games up until the winter break, as he left the club to return to his club of origin.

=== Basel ===
On 27 December 2017, FC Basel announced that Campo would return to the club, signing a four-and-a-half-year contract dated up until June 2022. Campo joined Basel's first team for during the winter break of their 2017–18 season under head coach Marcel Koller. After playing in five test games Campo played his domestic league debut for the club in the home game in the St. Jakob-Park on 4 February 2018 as Basel were defeated 1–0 by Lugano. He scored his first goal for his club in the home game on 29 April. It was the second goal of the match as Basel won 6–1 against Thun.

Under trainer Koller Basel won the Swiss Cup in the 2018–19 season. In the first round Basel beat Montlingen 3–0, in the second round Echallens Région 7–2 and in the round of 16 Winterthur 1–0. In the quarter finals Sion were defeated 4–2 after extra time and in the semi-finals Zürich were defeated 3–1. All these games were played away from home. The final was held on 19 May 2019 in the Stade de Suisse Wankdorf Bern against Thun. Albian Ajeti scored the first goal, Fabian Frei the second for Basel, then Dejan Sorgić netted a goal for Thun, but the end result was 2–1 for Basel. Campo played in two cup games and scored a goal in the match against Echallens.

On 14 October 2020, Campo was tested positive on the Corona virus. Following his illness, his recovery was slow and he did not return to fitness before the winter break.

==== Loan to Darmstadt ====
On 1 February 2021, the last day of the 2020–21 winter transfer window, Campo joined 2. Bundesliga club SV Darmstadt 98 on loan for the rest of the 2020–21 season.

==== Return to Basel ====
Following his loan period he returned to Basel, but on 2 July 2021 the club announced that Campo would move on to Luzern.

During his time with the club, Campo played a total of 112 games for Basel's first team scoring a total of 23 goals. 61 of these games were in the Swiss Super League, seven in the Swiss Cup, 16 in the UEFA competitions (Champions League and Europa League) and 28 were friendly games. He scored 15 goals in the domestic league, two in the cup, two in the Europa League and the other four were scored during the test games.

=== Luzern ===
Luzern confirmed on 2 July 2021 the transfer deal, stating Campo had signed a three-year contract up until the summer 2024. Campo joined Luzern's team for their 2021–22 season under head coach Fabio Celestini.

== International career ==
Campo is of Italian descent. He was a youth international for Switzerland.

== Honours ==
Lausanne-Sport

- Swiss Challenge League: 2015–16

Basel

- Swiss Cup: 2018–19

== Sources ==
- Rotblau: Jahrbuch Saison 2017/2018. Publisher: FC Basel Marketing AG. ISBN 978-3-7245-2189-1
- Die ersten 125 Jahre. Publisher: Josef Zindel im Friedrich Reinhardt Verlag, Basel. ISBN 978-3-7245-2305-5
- Verein "Basler Fussballarchiv" Homepage
