= Thomas Castella =

Swiss footballer (born 1993)

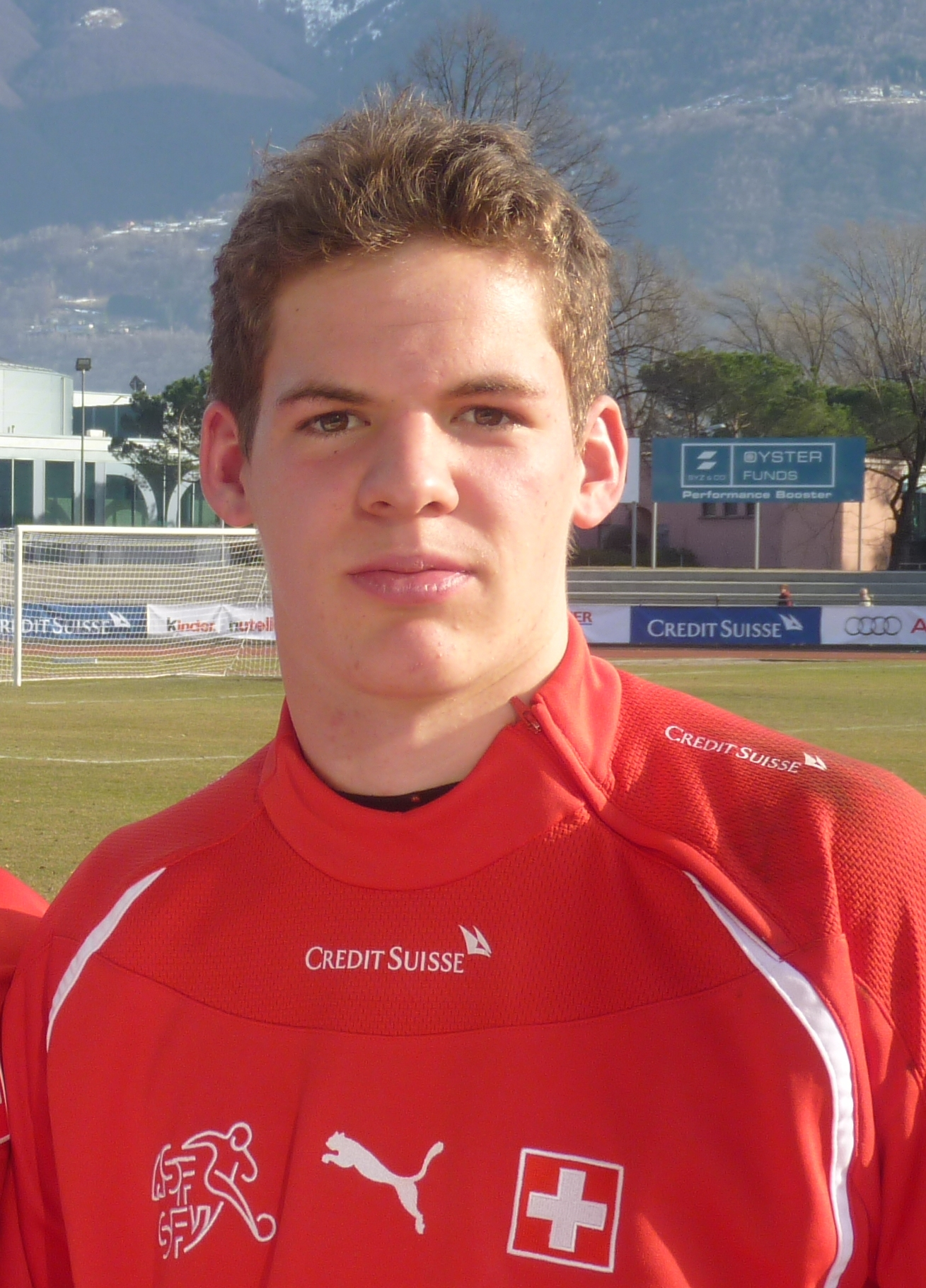
- Castella in 2012

Personal information
- Date of birth: 30 June 1993 (age 33)
- Place of birth: Fribourg, Switzerland
- Height: 1.87 m (6 ft 2 in)
- Position: Goalkeeper

Team information
- Current team: FC Lausanne-Sport
- Number: 1

Senior career*
Years	Team	Apps	(Gls)
2010–2012	Neuchâtel Xamax	0	(0)
2012–	Lausanne-Sport	234	(0)
- * Club domestic league appearances and goals as of 26 May 2026

Thomas Castella (born 30 June 1993) is a Swiss professional footballer who plays as a goalkeeper for FC Lausanne-Sport.

Junior at Team Friborg AFF / FFV, he subsequently trained at Neuchâtel Xamax. In June 2012, he transferred to Lausanne-Sport. During the 2015–16 season, he won the title of Swiss Challenge League and moved up to Swiss Super League. During his second year at the highest level, he received, at mid-season, the distinction of best goalkeeper in Super League by the Blick. Unfortunately, he will not avoid the relegation of his team at the end of the season.

After two consecutive seasons in the Swiss second division, the Lausanne-Sport returned to the Swiss first division. Castella greatly contributed to the success of his team by making 14 shutouts in 30 games. He received, in January 2020, during the SFL Award Night, the prize for best goalkeeper 2019 of the Brack Challenge League.

== Career statistics ==
As of match played 14 May 2025

Appearances and goals by club, season and competition
Club	Season	League			Cup		Other		Total	
Club	Season	Division	Apps	Goals	Apps	Goals	Apps	Goals	Apps	Goals
Neuchâtel Xamax	2010–11	Swiss Super League	0	0	0	0	—		0	0
Lausanne-Sport	2012–13	Swiss Super League	0	0	0	0	—		0	0
Lausanne-Sport	2013–14	Swiss Super League	0	0	0	0	—		0	0
Lausanne-Sport	2014–15	Swiss Challenge League	27	0	0	0	—		27	0
Lausanne-Sport	2015–16	Swiss Challenge League	23	0	0	0	—		23	0
Lausanne-Sport	2016–17	Swiss Super League	26	0	0	0	—		26	0
Lausanne-Sport	2017–18	Swiss Super League	36	0	3	0	—		39	0
Lausanne-Sport	2018–19	Swiss Challenge League	35	0	0	0	—		35	0
Lausanne-Sport	2019–20	Swiss Challenge League	30	0	2	0	—		32	0
Lausanne-Sport	2020–21	Swiss Super League	2	0	1	0	—		3	0
Lausanne-Sport	2021–22	Swiss Super League	9	0	3	0	—		12	0
Lausanne-Sport	2022–23	Swiss Challenge League	31	0	1	0	—		32	0
Lausanne-Sport	2023–24	Swiss Super League	6	0	1	0	—		7	0
Lausanne-Sport	2024–25	Swiss Super League	4	0	3	0	—		7	0
Lausanne-Sport	Total		229	0	14	0	0	0	243	0
Career total			229	0	14	0	0	0	243	0
