= Elton Monteiro =

Portuguese footballer (born 1994)

Personal information
- Full name: Elton Monteiro Almada
- Date of birth: 22 February 1994 (age 32)
- Place of birth: Sion, Switzerland
- Height: 1.92 m (6 ft 4 in)
- Position: Centre-back

Team information
- Current team: Vevey-Sports

Youth career
- Sion
- 2008−2011: Arsenal

Senior career*
Years	Team	Apps	(Gls)
2011–2013	Arsenal	0	(0)
2013−2015	Club Brugge	0	(0)
2014	→ Académica (loan)	0	(0)
2014	→ Braga B (loan)	6	(0)
2015–2022	Lausanne	183	(7)
2019	→ Miedź Legnica (loan)	4	(0)
2023	Hanoi Police	5	(0)
2024–	Vevey-Sports	8	(0)

International career
2013	Portugal U19	5	(0)
2014	Portugal U20	2	(0)
2013−2015	Portugal U21	1	(0)
- * Club domestic league appearances and goals as of 8 October 2023

Elton Monteiro Almada (born 22 February 1994) is a professional footballer who plays as a centre-back for Vevey-Sports. Born in Switzerland, he was a youth international for Portugal.

== Club career ==
On 16 August 2014, Monteiro made his professional debut with Braga B in a 2014–15 Segunda Liga match against Aves.

== International career ==
Monteiro was born in Switzerland to a Cape Verdean family, and has Swiss and Portuguese nationality, and represented Portugal at youth level. His brother Joël Monteiro is also a professional footballer.

== Career statistics ==
As of match played on 8 August 2019

Appearances and goals by club, season and competition
Club	Season	League			National cup		League cup		Other		Total	
Club	Season	Division	Apps	Goals	Apps	Goals	Apps	Goals	Apps	Goals	Apps	Goals
Braga B (loan)	2014–15	Segunda Liga	6	0	0	0	—		—		6	0
Lausanne-Sport	2014–15	Swiss Challenge League	7	0	0	0	—		—		7	0
Lausanne-Sport	2015–16	Swiss Challenge League	29	1	1	0	—		—		30	1
Lausanne-Sport	2016–17	Swiss Super League	30	0	0	0	—		—		30	0
Lausanne-Sport	2017–18	Swiss Super League	32	1	2	0	—		—		34	1
Lausanne-Sport	2018–19	Swiss Challenge League	9	1	1	0	—		—		10	1
Lausanne-Sport	Total		107	3	4	0	0	0	0	0	111	3
Miedź Legnica (loan)	2018–19	Ekstraklasa	4	0	0	0	—		—		4	0
Career total			117	3	4	0	0	0	0	0	121	3

== Honours ==
Lausanne

- Swiss Challenge League: 2015–16, 2019–20

Hanoi Police

- V.League 1: 2023
