= Adonis Ajeti =

Swiss footballer (born 1997)

Personal information
- Full name: Adonis Afrim Ajeti
- Date of birth: 26 February 1997 (age 29)
- Place of birth: Basel, Switzerland
- Height: 1.86 m (6 ft 1 in)
- Position: Centre back

Team information
- Current team: Schaffhausen
- Number: 22

Youth career
- 2005–2015: Basel

Senior career*
Years	Team	Apps	(Gls)
2014–2016	Basel U-21	30	(3)
2015–2016	Basel	0	(0)
2016–2017	FC Wil	21	(0)
2017–2021	St. Gallen	1	(0)
2018–2019	→ Chiasso (loan)	15	(0)
2023–2026	Rapperswil-Jona	70	(1)
2026–	Schaffhausen	6	(1)

International career
2012	Switzerland U15	5	(1)
2012	Switzerland U16	3	(0)
2013	Switzerland U17	3	(1)
2015	Switzerland U18	2	(1)
- * Club domestic league appearances and goals as of 19 September 2026

Adonis Afrim Ajeti (born 26 February 1997) is a Swiss professional footballer who plays as a defender for Swiss Promotion League club Schaffhausen.

He is the twin brother of Albian Ajeti and the younger brother of Arlind Ajeti. Adonis holds dual citizenship, the Swiss where he was born and grew up and the Albanian citizenship due to his parents' origin.

== Club career ==
=== Early career ===
The Ajeti twins started their youth football with Basel in 2005, at the same time as their elder brother moved to the club from Concordia. In the 2011–12 and 2012–13 seasons Adonis played in Basel's U-16 and with the team he twice became Swiss Champion at this level. During the 2012–13 season he also played in their U-18 team. On 30 April 2013, the twin brothers both signed their first professional contracts with the club, thus also becoming part of their first team. During the 2013–14 season he was called into their U-21 team.

=== Basel ===
Ajeti made his professional debut with Basel in the closing match of the 2015–16 UEFA Europa League group stage against Lech Poznań on 10 December 2015 coming on as a substitute at half-time in place of Michael Lang in a 0–1 away victory. He became the last of the brothers to make a professional debut also with Basel. Due to absence of Marek Suchý injured and since Basel had already secured the qualification to the knockout phase, the coach Urs Fischer invited him to participate in the match.

=== Wil ===
Following his professional debut with Basel, Ajeti continued his professional career at Swiss Challenge League club FC Wil 1900, where he signed on 7 February 2016 a contract until 30 June 2020.

=== Rapperswil-Jona ===
On 7 July 2023, Rapperswil-Jona announced the signing of Ajeti.

== International career ==
Ajeti played in several friendly matches with Switzerland national under-15 football team during the spring 2012 under the coach Yves Débonnaire including a full 80-minutes match against Belgium under-15 in where he played as a captain and scored a goal in a 5–3 win. Later in the same year in autumn and again under the same coach he captained Switzerland national under-16 football team in three friendly matches. He continued in 2013 captaining Switzerland national under-17 football team in two friendly matches in August against Germany and Austria. Then in 2015 he played for Switzerland national under-18 football team in a double friendly match against England on 26 and 28 March where he scored a goal.

== Personal life ==
Although born and raised in Switzerland, the Ajeti brothers speak Albanian because it is the language used within their family home.

== Career statistics ==
=== Club ===
As of 1 July 2019

Club	Season	League			Cup		Europe		Total	
Club	Season	Division	Apps	Goals	Apps	Goals	Apps	Goals	Apps	Goals
Basel U-21	2014–15	1. Liga Promotion	20	1	–		–		20	1
Basel U-21	2015–16	1. Liga Promotion	10	2	–		–		10	2
Basel U-21	Total		30	3	0	0	0	0	30	3
Basel	2015–16	Swiss Super League	0	0	0	0	1	0	1	0
Wil	2015–16	Swiss Challenge League	8	0	0	0	–		8	0
Wil	2016–17	Swiss Challenge League	13	0	0	0	–		13	0
Wil	Total		21	0	0	0	0	0	21	0
Chiasso (loan)	2018–19	Swiss Challenge League	15	0	1	0	–		16	0
Career total			66	3	1	0	1	0	67	3
