= 2017–18 Swiss Super League =

121st season of top-tier Swiss football

Swiss Super League
- Season: 2017–18
- Dates: 22 July 2017 – 19 May 2018
- Champions: Young Boys; 12th title
- Relegated: Lausanne-Sport
- Champions League: Young Boys; Basel
- Europa League: Luzern; Zürich; St. Gallen
- Matches: 180
- Goals: 541 (3.01 per match)
- Top goalscorer: Albian Ajeti (17 goals)
- Biggest home win: Young Boys 6–1 St. Gallen; Sion 7–2 Thun; Basel 6–1 Thun
- Biggest away win: Grasshopper 0–4 Young Boys; Young Boys 0–4 Thun; Lugano 0–4 Basel; Zürich 0–4 Grasshopper; St. Gallen 0–4 Lausanne-Sport
- Highest scoring: Sion 7–2 Thun
- Longest winning run: Young Boys (8 games)
- Longest unbeaten run: Young Boys (16 games)
- Longest winless run: Luzern (9 games)
- Longest losing run: St. Gallen (7 games)
- Highest attendance: 32,456; Basel 1–1 Young Boys (5 November 2017)
- Total attendance: 2,012,599
- Average attendance: 11,181

The 2017–18 Swiss Super League (referred to as the Raiffeisen Super League for sponsoring reasons) was the 121st season of top-tier competitive football in Switzerland and the 15th under its current name and format. Basel were the defending champions. Young Boys won the title on 28 April 2018 after a 2–1 win against Luzern, with four games to spare. It was their first league title in 32 years, having last won the league in the 1985–1986 season, and their 12th league title overall. They also ended Basel's run of eight consecutive titles.

A total of 10 teams competed in the league: the 9 best teams from the 2016–17 season and the 2016–17 Swiss Challenge League champion Zürich. The season started on the weekend of 22–23 July 2017 and ended on 19 May 2018 with a break between 17 December 2017 and 2 February 2018.

This season saw the introduction of changes in the way Swiss clubs may qualify for European competition; per new UEFA rules, the champions of the Swiss Super League now qualifies for the Champions League play-off round (previously directly to the Champions League group stage) and the runners-up now qualifies for the Champions League second qualifying round (previously to the third qualifying round). Qualification to Europa League spots for the third- and fourth-placed team remain unchanged.

== Teams ==
=== Stadia and locations ===
Location of the 2017–18 Swiss Super League teams

Club	Location	Stadium	Capacity
Basel	Basel	St. Jakob-Park	37,994
Grasshopper	Zürich	Letzigrund	26,104
Lausanne	Lausanne	Pontaise	8,500
Lugano	Lugano	Stadio Cornaredo	6,390
Luzern	Lucerne	Swissporarena	16,490
Sion	Sion	Stade Tourbillon	14,283
St. Gallen	St. Gallen	kybunpark	19,456
Thun	Thun	Stockhorn Arena	10,014
Young Boys	Bern	Stade de Suisse	31,789
FC Zürich	Zürich	Letzigrund	26,104

=== Personnel and kits ===
Team	Manager	Captain	Kit manufacturer	Shirt sponsor
Basel	(Switzerland) Raphaël Wicky	(Czech Republic) Marek Suchý	Adidas	Novartis
Grasshopper	(Germany) Thorsten Fink	(Australia) Trent Sainsbury	Puma	Fromm
Lausanne-Sport	(England) Alex Weaver	(Switzerland) Alain Rochat	Adidas	Banque cantonale vaudoise
Lugano	(Spain) Guillermo Abascal	(Uruguay) Jonathan Sabbatini	Acerbis	AIL
Luzern	(Switzerland) Gerardo Seoane	(Switzerland) Claudio Lustenberger	Adidas	Otto's
Sion	(Switzerland) Maurizio Jacobacci	(Switzerland) Kevin Fickentscher	Erreà	AFX Group
St. Gallen	(Croatia) Boro Kuzmanović (caretaker)	(Democratic Republic of the Congo) Nzuzi Toko	Jako	St.Galler Kantonalbank
Thun	(Switzerland) Marc Schneider	(Switzerland) Dennis Hediger	Nike	Panorama Center, Schneider Software AG
Young Boys	(Austria) Adi Hütter	(Switzerland) Steve von Bergen	Nike	Obi
Zürich	(Switzerland) Ludovic Magnin	(Iceland) Victor Pálsson	Nike	

=== Managerial changes ===
Team	Outgoing manager	Manner of departure	Date of departure	Position in table	Incoming manager	Date of appointment
Basel	(Switzerland) Urs Fischer	End of contract	3 June 2017	Pre-season	(Switzerland) Raphaël Wicky	3 June 2017
Thun	(Switzerland) Mauro Lustrinelli	End of interim	3 June 2017	Pre-season	(Switzerland) Marc Schneider	3 June 2017
Lugano	(Italy) Paolo Tramezzani	Mutual consent	7 June 2017	Pre-season	(Switzerland) Pierluigi Tami	12 June 2017
Sion	(Switzerland) Sébastien Fournier		15 June 2017	Pre-season	(Italy) Paolo Tramezzani	15 June 2017
Grasshopper	(Argentina) Carlos Bernegger	Sacked	24 August 2017	9th	(Switzerland) Murat Yakin	28 August 2017
Sion	(Italy) Paolo Tramezzani	Sacked	22 October 2017	7th	(Spain) Gabri	24 October 2017
Luzern	(Germany) Markus Babbel	Sacked	5 January 2018	9th	(Switzerland) Gerardo Seoane	9 January 2018
Sion	(Spain) Gabri	Sacked	6 February 2018	10th	(Switzerland) Maurizio Jacobacci	12 February 2018
Zürich	(Switzerland) Uli Forte	Sacked	20 February 2018	3rd	(Switzerland) Ludovic Magnin	20 February 2018
Lugano	(Switzerland) Pierluigi Tami	Sacked	9 April 2018	9th	(Spain) Guillermo Abascal	10 April 2018
Grasshopper	(Switzerland) Murat Yakin	Sacked	10 April 2018	6th	(Switzerland) Mathias Walther (caretaker)	10 April 2018
Lausanne-Sport	(Switzerland) Fabio Celestini	Sacked	19 April 2018	10th	(Switzerland) Ilija Borenovic (caretaker)	20 April 2018
Grasshopper	(Switzerland) Mathias Walther (caretaker)	End of interim	23 April 2018	7th	(Germany) Thorsten Fink	23 April 2018
St. Gallen	(Switzerland) Giorgio Contini	Sacked	24 April 2018	4th	(Croatia) Boro Kuzmanović (caretaker)	24 April 2018
Lausanne-Sport	(Switzerland) Ilija Borenovic (caretaker)	End of interim	11 May 2018	10th	(England) Alex Weaver	11 May 2018

== League table ==
Pos	Team	Pld	W	D	L	GF	GA	GD	Pts	Qualification or relegation
1	Young Boys (C)	36	26	6	4	84	41	+43	84	Qualification for the Champions League play-off round
2	Basel	36	20	9	7	72	36	+36	69	Qualification for the Champions League second qualifying round
3	Luzern	36	15	9	12	51	51	0	54	Qualification for the Europa League third qualifying round
4	Zürich	36	12	13	11	50	44	+6	49	Qualification for the Europa League group stage (Note: Zürich qualified for the Europa League group stage by winning the 2017–18 Swiss Cup.)
5	St. Gallen	36	14	3	19	52	72	−20	45	Qualification for the Europa League second qualifying round
6	Sion	36	11	9	16	53	56	−3	42	
7	Thun	36	12	6	18	53	68	−15	42	
8	Lugano	36	12	6	18	38	55	−17	42	
9	Grasshopper	36	10	9	17	43	52	−9	39	
10	Lausanne-Sport (R)	36	9	8	19	46	67	−21	35	Relegation to Swiss Challenge League

Source: Swiss Super League
Rules for classification: 1) Points; 2) Goal difference; 3) Goals scored; 4) Head-to-head goal difference; 5) Away goals scored; 6) Draw.
(C) Champions; (R) Relegated

=== Positions by round ===
Team ╲ Round	1	2	3	4	5	6	7	8	9	10	11	12	13	14	15	16	17	18	19	20	21	22	23	24	25	26	27	28	29	30	31	32	33	34	35	36
Young Boys	1	1	1	2	2	2	1	1	1	1	1	1	1	1	1	1	1	1	1	1	1	1	1	1	1	1	1	1	1	1	1	1	1	1	1	1
Basel	9	5	4	3	3	3	3	4	4	3	3	2	2	2	2	2	2	2	2	2	2	2	2	2	2	2	2	2	2	2	2	2	2	2	2	2
Luzern	3	6	6	4	4	4	4	6	7	8	9	9	10	8	9	10	9	8	9	9	7	6	6	6	5	4	4	4	4	4	3	3	3	3	3	3
Zürich	2	2	3	1	1	1	2	2	3	2	2	3	3	3	4	3	3	3	3	3	3	3	4	4	4	5	5	5	5	5	5	5	5	4	4	4
St. Gallen	6	4	2	5	5	6	5	3	2	4	4	4	4	4	5	4	4	5	4	5	6	5	3	3	3	3	3	3	3	3	4	4	4	5	5	5
Sion	4	3	5	6	6	7	7	5	6	6	7	7	8	9	10	7	10	10	10	10	10	10	10	10	9	10	10	10	9	9	9	9	9	9	7	6
Thun	8	8	10	8	7	8	9	8	9	7	8	8	7	7	8	9	8	7	8	8	9	9	9	9	10	9	9	7	7	7	6	8	6	7	9	7
Lugano	7	9	7	7	8	5	6	9	10	10	10	10	9	10	7	8	7	9	7	7	4	4	5	5	6	7	8	9	8	6	8	7	8	6	6	8
Grasshopper Club Zürich	10	10	9	10	9	9	8	7	5	5	5	5	5	5	3	5	5	4	6	4	5	7	7	7	7	6	6	6	6	8	7	6	7	8	8	9
Lausanne-Sport	5	7	8	9	10	10	10	10	8	9	6	6	6	6	6	6	6	6	5	6	8	8	8	8	8	8	7	8	10	10	10	10	10	10	10	10

2018–19 UEFA Champions League play-off round
2018–19 Champions League second qualifying round
2018–19 Europa League third qualifying round
2018–19 Europa League second qualifying round
Relegation to 2018–19 Swiss Challenge League

Source: Swiss Football League

Note: If a team wins the Swiss Cup, they will qualify for the Europa League group stage, unless they have already qualified for the Champions League through league position. In this case, the Europa League group stage berth will be given to the third-placed team, and both Europa League qualifying round spots will be moved one step down, to 4th and 5th respectively.

== Results ==
=== First and Second Round ===
Home \ Away	BAS	GRA	LS	LUG	LUZ	SIO	StG	THU	YB	ZUR
Basel	—	3–2	1–2	1–1	3–1	5–1	3–0	2–1	1–1	1–0
Grasshopper	0–0	—	2–0	0–1	1–1	3–2	2–0	2–0	0–4	0–2
Lausanne-Sport	1–4	1–1	—	2–3	3–1	0–1	3–3	1–3	2–1	1–1
Lugano	0–4	0–3	1–2	—	1–0	1–2	0–1	4–1	1–2	0–0
Luzern	1–4	2–2	2–3	1–0	—	2–1	3–0	2–2	0–1	1–1
Sion	1–1	3–0	1–1	2–2	1–1	—	1–2	2–3	0–1	1–1
St. Gallen	2–1	3–1	0–4	0–2	0–2	2–0	—	3–0	2–2	1–3
Thun	0–3	2–2	5–2	1–1	2–0	0–1	1–2	—	3–1	1–3
Young Boys	2–0	1–1	3–0	3–0	4–1	5–1	6–1	0–4	—	2–1
Zürich	0–0	0–4	2–0	3–0	1–2	2–0	1–1	2–1	0–0	—

Source: Swiss Super League (in German)
Legend: Blue = home team win; Yellow = draw; Red = away team win.

=== Third and Fourth Round ===
Home \ Away	BAS	GRA	LS	LUG	LUZ	SIO	StG	THU	YB	ZUR
Basel	—	1–0	2–1	0–1	2–2	1–0	0–2	6–1	5–1	3–0
Grasshopper	0–2	—	0–0	4–3	1–2	0–2	1–2	0–2	1–2	1–0
Lausanne-Sport	1–1	0–1	—	2–1	0–1	0–2	1–4	0–3 (Note: The game was in fact abandoned after about 70 minutes of play while the score was 0–2, due to violent behavior from some Lausanne fans. The discipline commission subsequently ruled that Lausanne lost the game by forfeit and awarded a 0–3 final score in favor of Thun.)	1–4	5–1
Lugano	0–1	1–0	2–0	—	1–2	1–0	2–1	1–1	2–4	1–1
Luzern	1–0	1–1	2–1	2–0	—	0–1	3–1	2–1	2–4	2–1
Sion	2–2	1–3	3–1	0–1	1–1	—	3–2	7–2	0–1	1–1
St. Gallen	2–4	2–1	0–3	3–0	2–3	3–2	—	0–1	2–4	1–2
Thun	0–2	2–1	0–0	0–2	1–0	1–4	1–2	—	2–2	0–1
Young Boys	2–2	3–1	4–1	3–1	2–1	1–0	2–0	3–1	—	1–0
Zürich	4–1	1–1	1–1	3–0	1–1	3–3	4–0	2–4	1–2	—

Source: Swiss Super League (in German)
Legend: Blue = home team win; Yellow = draw; Red = away team win.

== Season statistics ==
=== Top goalscorers ===
Rank	Player	Club	Goals
1	(Switzerland) Albian Ajeti^{1}	Basel (14) / St. Gallen (3)	17
2	(France) Guillaume Hoarau	Young Boys	15
3	(Cameroon) Jean-Pierre Nsame	Young Boys	13
3	(Switzerland) Marvin Spielmann	Thun	13
5	(Switzerland) Michael Frey	Zürich	12
5	(Ivory Coast) Roger Assalé	Young Boys	12
7	(Netherlands) Ricky van Wolfswinkel	Basel	11
7	(Switzerland) Pascal Schürpf	Luzern	11
7	(Switzerland) Simone Rapp^{2}	Lausanne-Sport (2) / Thun (9)	11
7	(Serbia) Miralem Sulejmani	Young Boys	11
7	(Norway) Mohamed Elyounoussi	Basel	11
7	(Switzerland) Christian Fassnacht	Young Boys	11

^{1}Ajeti played 7 games for St. Gallen then signed for Basel.
^{2}Rapp played 18 games for Thun then signed for Lausanne.

=== Top assists ===
Rank	Player	Club	Assists
1	(Switzerland) Matteo Tosetti	Thun	16
2	(Switzerland) Samuele Campo	Basel (7) / Lausanne-Sport (8)	15
3	(Norway) Mohamed Elyounoussi	Basel	14
4	(Switzerland) Davide Mariani	Lugano	10
5	(Switzerland) Christian Schneuwly	Luzern	9
5	(Serbia) Miralem Sulejmani	Young Boys	9
5	(Italy) Francesco Margiotta	Lausanne-Sport	9
5	(Ivory Coast) Roger Assalé	Young Boys	9
8	(Switzerland) Luca Zuffi	Basel	8

=== Hat-tricks ===
Player	For	Against	Result	Date
(Switzerland) Simone Rapp	Thun	Lausanne-Sport	3–1 (A)	28 October 2017
(Bosnia and Herzegovina) Kenan Kodro	Grasshopper	Lugano	4–3 (H)	21 April 2018
(Switzerland) Michael Frey	Zürich	Sion	3–3 (H)	29 April 2018
(Brazil) Matheus Cunha	Sion	Thun	4–1 (A)	19 May 2018

(H) – Home; (A) – Away

== Awards ==
=== Annual awards ===
Award	Winner	Club
Player of the Season	(Switzerland) Michael Lang	Basel
«Mon joueur» Fans' Player of the Year	(Switzerland) Michael Lang	Basel
Young Player of the Season	(Switzerland) Dimitri Oberlin	Basel
Coach of the Season	(Switzerland) Murat Yakin	Grasshopper
Goal of the Season	(Cameroon) Jean-Pierre Nsame	Young Boys

Team of the Year
Goalkeeper	(Czech Republic) Tomáš Vaclík (Basel)			
Defence	(Switzerland) Michel Lang (Basel)	(Switzerland) Jordan Lotomba (Young Boys)	(Switzerland) Manuel Akanji (Basel)	(Switzerland) Kevin Mbabu (Young Boys)
Midfield	(Norway) Mohamed Elyounoussi (Basel)	(Ivory Coast) Sekou Sanogo (Young Boys)	(Switzerland) Renato Steffen (Basel)	(Serbia) Miralem Sulejmani (Young Boys)
Attack	(Switzerland) Simone Rapp (Thun)		(Ivory Coast) Roger Assalé (Young Boys)	

== Attendance ==
Team	Played	Total	Average
Basel	18	465,426	25,859
Young Boys	18	395,512	21,973
St. Gallen	18	227,043	12,614
Zürich	18	193,073	10,726
Luzern	18	180,925	10,051
Sion	18	178,600	9,922
Grasshopper	18	126,300	7,017
Thun	18	106,335	5,908
Lausanne-Sport	18	71,931	3,996
Lugano	18	67,454	3,747
League total	180	2,012,599	11,181
