= Carte Said =

Italian-Tanzanian footballer (born 1997)

Personal information
- Full name: Carte Said Mhando
- Date of birth: 15 April 1997 (age 29)
- Place of birth: Pozzuoli, Italy
- Height: 1.78 m (5 ft 10 in)
- Position: Midfielder

Team information
- Current team: Ebolitana

Youth career
- –2016: Brescia

Senior career*
Years	Team	Apps	(Gls)
2016	Brescia	2	(0)
2017–2018	Chiasso	42	(0)
2018–2019	Ascoli	0	(0)
2018–2019	→ Cuneo (loan)	34	(3)
2019–2021	Fano	33	(1)
2021	Foggia	2	(0)
2021–2023	Chiasso	36	(14)
2023	Paradiso	12	(0)
2023–2024	Locarno	17	(1)
2024–2025	Angri	14	(0)
2025	Sammaurese	10	(0)
2026–	Ebolitana		
- * Club domestic league appearances and goals as of 21 December 2025

Carte Said Mhando, known as Carte Said (born 15 April 1997) is an Italian football player who plays for Eccellenza club Ebolitana. He is of Tanzanian descent.

== Club career ==
He made his Serie B debut for Brescia on 30 April 2016 in a game against Vicenza.

On 1 August 2019, he signed a 2-year contract with Serie C club Fano.

On 27 January 2021 he moved to Foggia.

On 11 July 2021, he returned to Chiasso.
