= Andrea Maccoppi =

Italian footballer (born 1987)

Personal information
- Date of birth: 22 January 1987 (age 39)
- Place of birth: Milan, Italy
- Height: 1.76 m (5 ft 9 in)
- Position: Midfielder

Team information
- Current team: Lugano II
- Number: 14

Senior career*
Years	Team	Apps	(Gls)
2004–2010	Piacenza	3	(0)
2006–2007	→ Lecco (loan)	12	(0)
2007–2008	→ Varese (loan)	8	(0)
2008	→ Pizzighettone (loan)	24	(0)
2010–2012	Locarno	54	(1)
2012–2014	Vaduz	41	(3)
2014–2016	Chiasso	60	(1)
2016–2018	Lausanne	51	(0)
2018–2021	Servette	34	(1)
2020–2021	→ Chiasso (loan)	28	(1)
2021–2024	Chiasso	31	(3)
2022–2024	→ Lugano II (loan)	63	(4)
2024–	Lugano II	13	(1)
- * Club domestic league appearances and goals as of 26 October 2024

Andrea Maccoppi (born 22 January 1987) is an Italian footballer who plays as a midfielder for Swiss club Lugano II.

== Club career ==
On 13 July 2022, Maccoppi joined Lugano II on a two-season loan.
