= Albian Ajeti =

Swiss footballer (born 1997)

Personal information
- Full name: Albian Afrim Ajeti
- Date of birth: 26 February 1997 (age 29)
- Place of birth: Basel, Switzerland
- Height: 1.83 m (6 ft 0 in)
- Position: Striker

Team information
- Current team: Lugano (on loan from Basel)
- Number: 9

Youth career
- 2005–2015: Basel

Senior career*
Years	Team	Apps	(Gls)
2014–2016	Basel	11	(3)
2016	FC Augsburg II	6	(2)
2016–2017	FC Augsburg	1	(0)
2016–2017	→ St. Gallen (loan)	29	(10)
2017	St. Gallen	7	(3)
2017–2019	Basel	58	(29)
2019–2020	West Ham United	9	(0)
2020–2023	Celtic	27	(8)
2022–2023	→ Sturm Graz (loan)	15	(3)
2023–2024	Gaziantep	4	(1)
2024–	Basel	71	(15)
2026–	→ Lugano (loan)	5	(2)

International career^{‡}
2012	Switzerland U15	6	(2)
2012	Switzerland U16	2	(1)
2012–2014	Switzerland U17	17	(7)
2014–2015	Switzerland U18	3	(2)
2015	Switzerland U20	1	(0)
2015–2018	Switzerland U21	8	(0)
2018–2020	Switzerland	11	(1)
- * Club domestic league appearances and goals as of 20 September 2026 ‡ National team caps and goals as of 4 September 2023

Albian Afrim Ajeti (born 26 February 1997) is a Swiss professional footballer who plays as a striker for Swiss Super League club Lugano on loan from Basel.

He has previously played for FC Basel (two spells), FC Augsburg, St. Gallen, West Ham United, Celtic, Sturm Graz and Gaziantep.

== Club career ==
=== Youth ===
The Ajeti twins started their youth football with Basel in 2005, at the same time as their elder brother moved to the club from Concordia. In the 2011–12 and 2012–13 seasons Albian Ajeti played in Basel's U-16 and with the team he twice became Swiss Champion at this level. During the 2012–13 season he also played in their U-18 team. On 30 April 2013 the twin brothers both signed their first professional contracts with the club, thus also becoming part of their first team. During the 2013–14 season he was called into their U-21 team.

=== Basel ===
Albian Ajeti played a number of test games before the 2013–14 FC Basel season and scored the winning goal in the 3–2 win against RB Leipzig on 26 June 2013 during the club's training camp in Walchensee. He spent most of the season playing with the FCB U-21 team in the 1. Liga Promotion, the third tier of the Swiss Football League, but was often called to the first team, taking a place on their substitute bench.

Ajeti made his professional debut, coming in as a substitute, on 13 March 2014 in the 2013–14 UEFA Europa League Round of 16 home tie in St. Jakob-Park. The match against Red Bull Salzburg ended in a goalless draw. At 6 April 2014, he made his league debut against FC Thun in a goalless draw in St. Jakob-Park. At the end of the 2013–14 Super League season he won the league championship with Basel. They also reached the final of the 2013–14 Swiss Cup, but were beaten 2–0 by Zürich after extra time. During the 2013–14 Champions League season Basel reached the group stage and finished the group in third position. Thus they qualified for Europa League knockout phase and here they advanced as far as the quarter-finals.

For Ajeti and for Basel the season 2014–15 was a very successful one. The championship was won for the sixth time in a row that season and in the 2014–15 Swiss Cup they reached the final. But for the third season in a row, they finished as runners-up, losing 0–3 to FC Sion in the final. Basel entered the Champions League in the group stage and reached the knockout phase as on 9 December 2014 they managed a 1–1 draw at Anfield against Liverpool. But then Basel then lost to Porto in the Round of 16. Basel played a total of 65 matches (36 Swiss League fixtures, 6 Swiss Cup, 8 Champions League and 15 test matches). Under trainer Paulo Sousa Ajeti totaled 16 appearances, 4 in the League, 2 in the Cup, as well 10 in test games. He scored 3 goals in these matches, all being in the test matches. he also played for their U-21 team.

=== Augsburg ===
Ajeti signed a four-and-a-half-year contract with FC Augsburg on 8 January 2016. Ajeti made a solitary Bundesliga appearance for Augsburg, coming on as a 54th minute substitute in a 2–2 draw against Darmstadt on 12 March 2016.

=== St. Gallen ===
In the 2016–17 Swiss Super League season Ajeti was loaned to St. Gallen on a one-year loan with the option for the club to buy the player. At the end of the season, St. Gallen signed Ajeti.

=== Return to Basel ===
On 2 October 2017, Basel announced that Ajeti had signed a five-year contract. On 14 October 2017, Ajeti scored on his debut for Basel in a 4–0 away win against Lugano. In Basel's last five games of their 2017–18 season, Ajeti scored seven goals, taking his total for the 2017–18 Swiss Super League season to 17, becoming the top scorer, with 14 goals scored for Basel. In the following season, Ajeti again scored 14 league goals for the club. Under trainer Marcel Koller Basel won the Swiss Cup in the 2018–19 season. In the first round Basel beat lower classed FC Montlingen, in the second round Echallens Région and in the round of 16 Winterthur. In the quarter-finals Sion were defeated and in the semi-finals Zürich. All these games were played away from home. The final was held on 19 May 2019 in the Stade de Suisse Wankdorf Bern against Thun. Striker Ajeti scored the first goal, Fabian Frei the second for Basel, then Dejan Sorgić netted a goal for Thun, but the end result was 2–1 for Basel. On 19 July 2019, in Ajeti's last Swiss Super League appearance for Basel, he scored the opening goal and assisted twice more in a 4–1 away win against Sion.

=== West Ham United ===
On 8 August 2019, Ajeti joined West Ham United signing a four-year contract for a fee of £8 million. On 27 August 2019, Ajeti made his debut, starting in a 2–0 win against Newport County in the EFL Cup.

=== Celtic ===
Ajeti joined Celtic on a four-year deal on 13 August 2020, for a reported fee of £5 million. He made his league debut for Celtic on 22 August 2020 against Dundee United, coming on as a substitute in 73rd minute and scoring the winning goal in 83rd minute in a 1–0 win.

==== Sturm Graz (loan) ====
On 31 August 2022, Celtic sent Ajeti on a season-long loan with an option-to-buy to Austrian Bundesliga side Sturm Graz. On 29 May 2023, Ajeti returned to Celtic after Sturm Graz decided not to trigger the buy-option clause.

=== Gaziantep ===
On 4 September 2023, Süper Lig club Gaziantep announced the signing of Ajeti on a one-year contract with an option for a further year, for an undisclosed fee.

=== Second return to Basel ===
On 1 February 2024, Ajeti returned to Basel on a contract until 30 June 2025, with an option to extend.

On 1 September 2026, Ajeti was loaned by Lugano, with an option to buy.

== International career ==
Ajeti made appearances for the Switzerland U-15 and U-16 national teams. He played his debut for their U-17 team being substituted in during the 3–0 win against the Faroe Islands U-17 on 10 October 2012. He scored his first goal for the team just two days later during the 5–1 victory against Cyprus U-17. Altogether he played 17 games for the U-17 scoring a total of 7 goals.

Ajeti played his debut for the Swiss U-18 team on 4 September 2014 as the Swiss won 1–0 in the away game against the Swedish U-18 team in Gävle. It was Ajeti who scored the winning goal in the 88th minute. He played his debut for the U-20 national team on 31 March 2015 as the Swiss were defeated 1–0 by the Italian U-20 team.

In August 2015 Albania's coach, Gianni de Biasi declared to the Swiss media that he plans to call Ajeti for the October 2015 qualifying matches of Euro 2016.

Ajeti earned his first appearance for Switzerland on 8 September 2018, coming on as a substitute for Breel Embolo and scored his first goal in a 6–0 win against Iceland in the UEFA Nations League.

In May 2019, he played in 2019 UEFA Nations League Finals, where his team finished 4th.

== Personal life ==
Albian Ajeti's older brother Arlind who currently plays as a centre-back for Turkish club Bodrum and the Albania national team, his twin brother Adonis who most recent played for Rapperswil-Jona.

Ajeti is of Albanian descent. He is a fluent speaker of Albanian, which he uses with his family.

== Career statistics ==
=== Club ===
As of match played 23 April 2023

Appearances and goals by club, season and competition
Club	Season	League			National cup (Note: Includes Swiss Cup, FA Cup, Scottish Cup and Belgian Cup)		League cup (Note: Includes EFL Cup and Scottish League Cup)		Continental		Total	
Club	Season	Division	Apps	Goals	Apps	Goals	Apps	Goals	Apps	Goals	Apps	Goals
Basel	2013–14	Swiss Super League	2	1	0	0	—		1 (Note: Appearance(s) in UEFA Europa League)	0	3	1
Basel	2014–15	Swiss Super League	4	1	2	0	—		0	0	6	1
Basel	2015–16	Swiss Super League	5	1	3	1	—		3 (Note: One appearance in UEFA Champions League, two appearances in UEFA Europa League)	0	11	2
Basel	Total		11	3	5	1	—		4	0	20	4
FC Augsburg II	2015–16	Regionalliga Bayern	5	2	—		—		—		5	2
FC Augsburg II	2016–17	Regionalliga Bayern	1	0	—		—		—		1	0
FC Augsburg II	Total		6	2	0	0	0	0	0	0	6	2
FC Augsburg	2015–16	Bundesliga	1	0	0	0	—		—		1	0
St. Gallen (loan)	2016–17	Swiss Super League	29	10	1	1	—		—		30	11
St. Gallen	2017–18	Swiss Super League	7	3	1	0	—		—		8	3
Basel	2017–18	Swiss Super League	25	14	1	0	—		3 (Note: Appearance(s) in UEFA Champions League)	0	29	14
Basel	2018–19	Swiss Super League	32	14	5	5	—		6 (Note: Two appearances and one goal in UEFA Champions League, four appearances and one goal in UEFA Europa League)	2	43	21
Basel	2019–20	Swiss Super League	1	1	0	0	—		2	1	3	2
Basel	Total		58	29	6	5	0	0	11	3	75	37
West Ham United	2019–20	Premier League	9	0	1	0	2	0	—		12	0
Celtic	2020–21	Scottish Premiership	20	6	3 (Note: Includes one appearance in the later stages of the 2019–20 Scottish Cup, which were played in October and December 2020.)	0	1	0	7 (Note: Two appearances in UEFA Champions League, five appearances in UEFA Europa League)	0	31	6
Celtic	2021–22	Scottish Premiership	7	2	0	0	3	0	7 (Note: Two appearances in UEFA Champions League, five appearances and one goal in UEFA Europa League)	1	17	3
Celtic	Total		27	8	3	0	4	0	14	1	48	9
Sturm Graz (loan)	2022–23	Austrian Bundesliga	15	3	3	1	—		5	0	23	4
Gaziantep	2023–24	Süper Lig	0	0	0	0	—		—		0	0
Career total			163	58	20	8	6	0	34	4	223	70

=== International ===
Scores and results list Switzerland's goal tally first, score column indicates score after each Ajeti goal.

List of international goals scored by Albian Ajeti
No.	Date	Venue	Cap	Opponent	Score	Result	Competition	Ref.
1	8 September 2018	Kybunpark, St. Gallen, Switzerland	1	Iceland	5–0	6–0	2018–19 UEFA Nations League A	

== Honours ==
Basel Youth

- Swiss U16 Champion: 2011–12, 2012–13

Basel

- Swiss Super League: 2014–15, 2024–25
- Swiss Cup: 2018–19; runner-up: 2014–15

Celtic

- Scottish Premiership: 2021–22
- Scottish Cup: 2019–20
- Scottish League Cup: 2021–22

Individual

- Swiss Super League top scorer: 2017–18 (17 goals)
