= Fabian Frei =

Swiss footballer (born 1989)

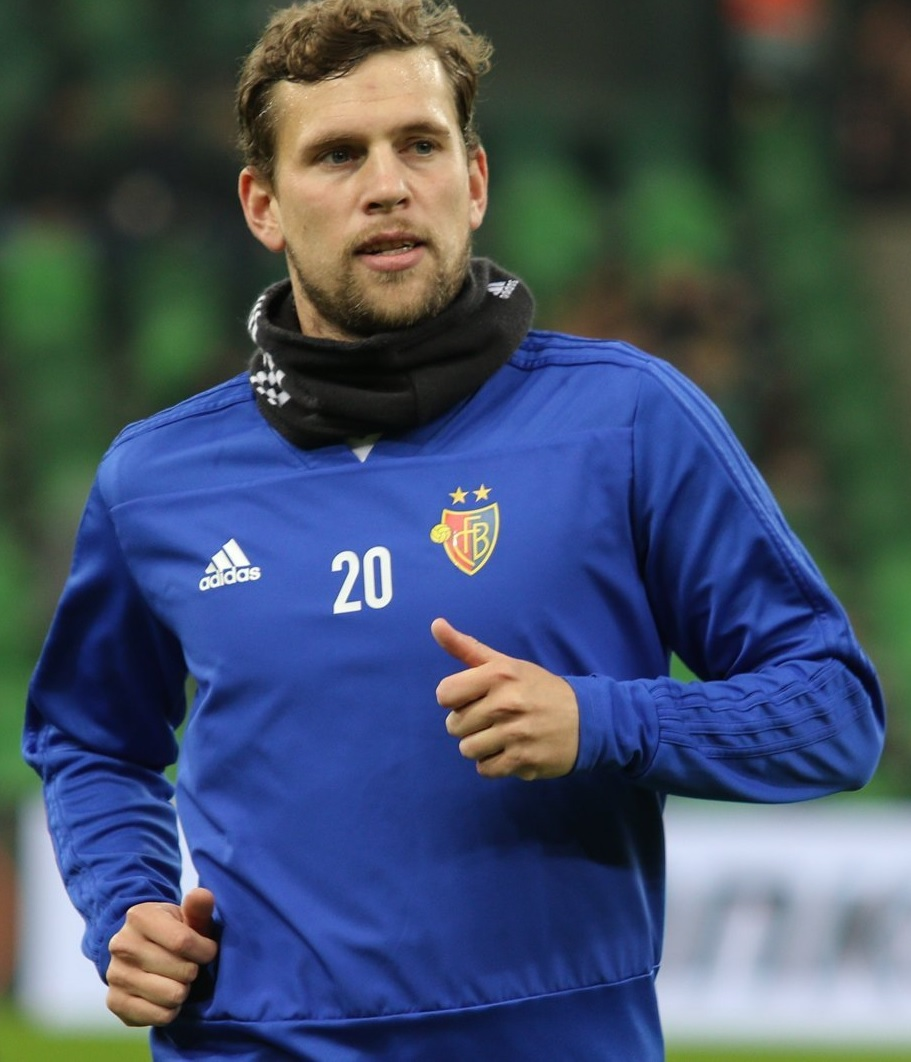
- Frei with Basel in 2019

Personal information
- Full name: Fabian Frei
- Date of birth: 8 January 1989 (age 37)
- Place of birth: Frauenfeld, Switzerland
- Height: 1.83 m (6 ft 0 in)
- Positions: Defensive midfielder; centre-back

Youth career
- 1998–2000: Frauenfeld
- 2000–2004: Winterthur
- 2004–2007: Basel

Senior career*
Years	Team	Apps	(Gls)
2005–2007	Basel II	31	(11)
2007–2015	Basel	172	(15)
2009–2011	→ St. Gallen (loan)	64	(13)
2015–2018	Mainz 05	53	(1)
2018–2024	Basel	214	(25)
2024–2025	Winterthur	30	(2)
Total		564	(67)

International career
2004–2005	Switzerland U16	11	(4)
2005–2006	Switzerland U17	14	(10)
2006–2007	Switzerland U18	5	(2)
2007–2008	Switzerland U19	7	(5)
2008	Switzerland U20	3	(0)
2008–2011	Switzerland U21	18	(4)
2012	Switzerland Olympic	4	(0)
2011–2022	Switzerland	24	(3)
- * Club domestic league appearances and goals

Fabian Frei (born 8 January 1989) is a Swiss former professional footballer who played as a defensive midfielder or centre-back. He is best known for holding the records for most appearances in competitive games for Basel and for most appearances in the Swiss Super League, with 543 and 468 appearances, respectively.

Internationally, Frei represented Switzerland at several youth levels, most notably being part of the squad that finished as runners-up at the 2011 U21 Euro. He made his senior international debut for Switzerland on 7 October 2011 and was selected to represent his country at the 2012 Summer Olympics. He made 24 appearances for the national team and participated at two senior international tournaments, UEFA Euro 2016 and the 2022 FIFA World Cup.

He is of no relation to former club and country teammate Alexander Frei.

== Club career ==
=== Basel ===
Born in Frauenfeld, Frei started his youth football with local amateur club FC Frauenfeld and then he moved to the youth of FC Winterthur in summer 2000. However, he came through the ranks with FC Basel, joining their youth department and playing in their U-16 team, winning the Swiss championship title for that age group in the 2004–05 season. He played in their U-18 team during the 2005–06 season, under coach Patrick Rahmen and his assistant Marco Walker and with them won both the Swiss U-18 championship and the U-19/18 national cup that season. For the 2006–07 season, he advanced to their U-21 team, who played in the third tier, and was given a professional contract. The team won their division and became Swiss champions at U-21 level, Frei, playing as attacking midfielder, made 30 appearances, scoring 11 goals.

Ahead of their 2007–08 season Frei was called into the first team squad by head coach Christian Gross. After having played in 13 test games, Frei played his domestic league debut for the club in the home game in the St. Jakob-Park on 22 July 2007 as Basel won 1–0 against Zürich. He played his UEFA Cup debut with the team in the home game on 16 August, coming on as substitute, as Basel won 2–1 against SV Mattersburg. Basel played in the 2007–08 UEFA Cup. Winning both matches in the qualification round and both matches in the play-off round, they team advanced to the group stage, which they ended undefeated in second position, after playing 1–0 at home against Stade Rennes, 0–0 away against Dinamo Zagreb, 1–0 at home against Brann and 1–1 away against Hamburger SV, to continue the knockout stage. But then they were eliminated here by Sporting CP. Frei had seven appearances during the teams 10 European games. At the end of their 2007–08 season Frei won the Double with the club. They won the League Championship title with four points advantage over second placed Young Boys. Frei had 24 appearances. In the Swiss Cup Basel advanced to the final, and winning this 4–1 against AC Bellinzona they won the competition.

To the beginning of the 2008–09 season he was member of the Basel team that won the Uhrencup. They beat Legia Warsaw 6–1 and played a 2–2 draw with Borussia Dortmund to end the table on top slot above Dortmund and Luzern. Frei played his UEFA Champions League debut for Basel on 26 November 2008 in the 5–0 away defeat against Shakhtar Donetsk. He scored his first goal with the team in the home game on 4 December 2008. It was the last goal of the match as Basel won 3–1 against FC Aarau.

In July 2009, due to the fact that Basel strengthened their squad for the beginning of the 2009–10 Swiss Super League season, Basel's new trainer Thorsten Fink loaned Fabian Frei to FC St. Gallen. During his two-year loan in St. Gallen, he played 64 league games in which he scored 13 goals.

For the start of the 2011–12 Swiss Super League season he was recalled to Basel, the reigning Swiss Champions, and he immediately won his place in the starting eleven. Frei scored his first Champions League goal for Basel on 14 September 2011 in the Group C 2–1 home win against Oțelul Galați, his second on 27 September in the 3–3 draw at Old Trafford against Manchester United and his third on 22 November in the Arena Națională, in Bucharest, as Basel won the away game against Oțelul Galați 3–2. At the end of the 2011–12 season, Frei won the Double, the League Championship title and the Swiss Cup with Basel.

At the end of the Swiss Super League season 2012–13 Frei won the Championship title and was Swiss Cup runner up with Basel. In the 2012–13 UEFA Europa League Basel advanced as far as the semi-finals, there being matched against the reigning UEFA Champions League holders Chelsea, but they were knocked out, losing both home and away tie, beaten 2–5 on aggregate.

At the end of the 2013–14 Super League season Frei won his fourth league championship with Basel. They also reached the final of the 2013–14 Swiss Cup, but were beaten 2–0 by Zürich after extra time. During the 2013–14 Champions League season Basel reached the group stage and finished the group in third position. Thus they qualified for Europa League knockout phase and here they advanced as far as the quarter-finals. In their season 2013–14 Basel played a total of 68 matches (36 Swiss League fixtures, 6 Swiss Cup, 6 Champions League and 10 Europa League and 10 test matches). Frei totaled 66 appearances, 34 League, 6 Cup, 6 Champions League and 10 Europa League as well all 10 in the test games.

The season 2014–15 was a very successful one for Basel and for Frei. The championship was won for the sixth time in a row that season and in the 2014–15 Swiss Cup they reached the final. But for the third season in a row, they finished as runners-up, losing 0–3 to FC Sion in the final. Basel entered the Champions League in the group stage and reached the knockout phase as on 9 December 2014 they managed a 1–1 draw at Anfield against Liverpool. Frei scored the goal for FC Basel against Liverpool to help Basel to the next round of the UEFA Champions League. But then Basel then lost to FC Porto in the Round of 16. Basel played a total of 65 matches (36 Swiss League fixtures, 6 Swiss Cup, 8 Champions League and 15 test matches). Under trainer Paulo Sousa Frei totaled 56 appearances, 31 in the Super League, 5 Cup, 8 Champions League, as well 12 in test games. He scored a total of 4 goals in these matches.

=== Mainz 05 ===
On 23 June 2015, Frei joined German Bundesliga club 1. FSV Mainz 05.

=== Return to Basel ===
On 23 December 2017, FC Basel announced that Frei would return to the club, signing a four-and-a-half-year contract dated up until June 2022.

Under trainer Marcel Koller Basel won the Swiss Cup in the 2018–19 season. In the first round Basel beat Montlingen 3–0, in the second round Echallens Région 7–2 and in the round of 16 Winterthur 1–0. In the quarter-finals Sion were defeated 4–2 after extra time and in the semi-finals Zürich were defeated 3–1. All these games were played away from home. The final was held on 19 May 2019 in the Stade de Suisse Wankdorf Bern against Thun. Striker Albian Ajeti scored the first goal, Fabian Frei the second for Basel, then Dejan Sorgić netted a goal for Thun, but the result was 2–1 for Basel. Frei played in five cup games and scored not only in the final but also a goal in the match against Echallens.

On 9 September 2024, Frei's contract with Basel was terminated by mutual consent, so that he can take on a new challenge. Between his two tenures, from 2007 to 2015 and again from 2018 to 2024, he played a total of 679 games for Basel, scoring a total of 94 goals. 386 of these games were in the Swiss Super League, 46 in the Swiss Cup, 111 in the UEFA competitions (Champions League, Europa League and Conference League) and 136 were friendly games. He scored 41 goals in the domestic league, 10 in the cup, 13 in the European games and the other 30 were scored during the test games. Frei is the clubs record holder for the number of competition matches played with the club. He played 543 games in league, cup and UEFA.

=== FC Winterthur ===
On the day of his departure from Basel, he joined fellow Super League side FC Winterthur. On 25 February 2025, Frei announced his plan to retire by the end of the season.

== International career ==
Frei represented Switzerland at various age levels. He played his Swiss Under-16s debut on 12 October 2004 in the 3–1 away win against the Belgium Under-16s. In 14 games for the Switzerland U-17 team he scored ten goals.

Between 2008 and 2011 Fabian Frei played 18 games for the Switzerland U-21 team. His Under-21s debut was on 19 November 2008 in the 1–1 away draw against the Greece Under-21 team. His last game was the 2011 UEFA European Under-21 Championship Final on 25 June 2011.

Following this he was called into the Swiss national football team by trainer Ottmar Hitzfeld. Frei gave his international debut for Switzerland on 7 October 2011 in the UEFA Euro 2012 qualifying game in the Liberty Stadium against Wales.

Frei was selected to represent Switzerland in the men's football tournament at the 2012 Summer Olympics as part of the Swiss under-23 team. He played over 90 minutes in all three games in the tournament, but the team were knocked out, finishing in fourth position of their Group.

== Career statistics ==
=== Club ===
Appearances and goals by club, season and competition
Club	Season	League			National cup (Note: Includes Swiss Cup, DFB-Pokal)		Europe		Total	
Club	Season	Division	Apps	Goals	Apps	Goals	Apps	Goals	Apps	Goals
Basel	2007–08	Swiss Super League	24	0	2	0	7 (Note: Appearances in UEFA Europa League)	0	33	0
Basel	2008–09	Swiss Super League	25	2	4	0	2 (Note: Appearances in UEFA Champions League)	0	31	2
Basel	2011–12	Swiss Super League	31	4	4	2	8	3	43	9
Basel	2012–13	Swiss Super League	27	4	5	2	16 (Note: Three appearances in UEFA Champions League, thirteen appearances and a goal in UEFA Europa League)	1	48	7
Basel	2013–14	Swiss Super League	34	5	6	1	16 (Note: Ten appearances and a goal in UEFA Champions League, six appearances in UEFA Europa League)	1	56	7
Basel	2014–15	Swiss Super League	31	1	5	1	8	1	44	3
Basel	Total		172	16	26	6	57	6	255	28
St. Gallen (loan)	2009–10	Swiss Super League	30	6	5	1	—		35	7
St. Gallen (loan)	2010–11	Swiss Super League	34	7	3	4	—		37	11
St. Gallen (loan)	Total		64	13	8	5	0	0	72	18
Mainz 05	2015–16	Bundesliga	18	0	1	1	—		19	1
Mainz 05	2016–17	Bundesliga	24	0	1	1	4	0	29	1
Mainz 05	2017–18	Bundesliga	11	1	3	0	—		14	1
Mainz 05	Total		53	1	5	2	4	0	62	3
Basel	2017–18	Swiss Super League	0	0	0	0	0	0	0	0
Career total			289	30	39	13	61	6	389	49

=== International ===
Scores and results list Switzerland's goal tally first, score column indicates score after each Frei goal.

List of international goals scored by Fabian Frei
No.	Date	Venue	Opponent	Score	Result	Competition
1	18 November 2014	Municipal Stadium, Wrocław, Poland	Poland	2–2	2–2	Friendly
2	7 October 2017	St. Jakob-Park, Basel, Switzerland	Hungary	2–0	5–2	2018 FIFA World Cup qualification
3	27 March 2018	Swissporarena, Lucerne, Switzerland	Panama	6–0	6–0	Friendly

== Honours ==
Basel youth

- Swiss champion at U-16 level: 2004–05
- Swiss champion at U-18 level: 2005–06
- Swiss Cup at U-19/U-18 level: 2005–06
- Swiss champion at U-21 level: 2006–07

Basel

- Swiss Super League: 2007–08, 2011–12, 2012–13, 2013–14, 2014–15
- Swiss Cup: 2007–08, 2011–12, 2018–19; runner up: 2012–13, 2013–14, 2014–15

Switzerland U21

- UEFA Euro U21 runner-up: 2011

Individual

- Goal of the Year: 2008–09 (5 December 2008 vs. FC Aarau)
- UEFA Europa League Squad of the Season: 2019–20

== Sources ==
- Josef Zindel (2018). FC Basel 1893. Die ersten 125 Jahre (in German). Basel: Friedrich Reinhardt Verlag. ISBN 978-3-7245-2305-5.
