= Raphaël Wicky =

Swiss footballer and coach (born 1977)

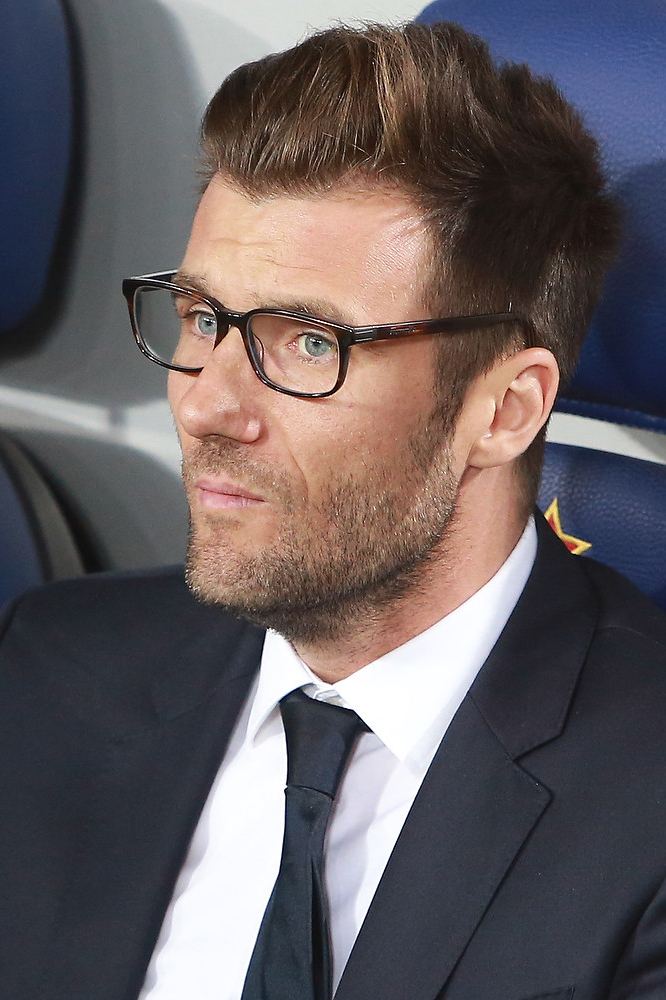
- Wicky coaching Basel in 2017

Personal information
- Full name: Raphaël Wicky
- Date of birth: 26 April 1977 (age 49)
- Place of birth: Leuggern, Switzerland
- Height: 1.78 m (5 ft 10 in)
- Positions: Midfielder; defender

Youth career
- 1984–1990: Steg
- 1990–1993: Sion

Senior career*
Years	Team	Apps	(Gls)
1993–1997	Sion	130	(3)
1997–2000	Werder Bremen	92	(1)
2001	Atlético Madrid	11	(0)
2001–2007	Hamburger SV	126	(4)
2007	Sion	5	(0)
2008	Chivas USA	5	(0)
Total		369	(8)

International career
1996–2008	Switzerland	75	(1)

Managerial career
- 2009–2010: Thun (youth)
- 2010–2013: Servette (youth)
- 2013–2016: Basel (U18)
- 2016–2017: Basel (U21)
- 2017–2018: Basel
- 2019: United States U17
- 2020–2021: Chicago Fire
- 2022–2024: Young Boys
- 2026: Sporting Kansas City
- * Club domestic league appearances and goals

Raphaël Wicky (born 26 April 1977) is a Swiss professional football coach and former player who was most recently the head coach for Major League Soccer club Sporting Kansas City.

His playing career was spent mostly in the German Bundesliga with Werder Bremen and Hamburg, as well as a brief spell in Spain's Segunda División with Atlético Madrid. He earned 75 caps for Switzerland between 1996 and 2008, playing at two European Championships and the 2006 FIFA World Cup.

As a manager, he won the Swiss Super League and Swiss Cup double with Basel in 2017, and also spent two years in Major League Soccer with the Chicago Fire. He returned to Switzerland in 2022 with Young Boys and won his second Swiss Super League title in 2023. Wicky returned to Major League Soccer in 2026 with Sporting Kansas City, but was sacked after just one season.

== Club career ==
Born in Leuggern in the canton of Aargau, Wicky started his career with Sion, and went on to represent Werder Bremen. In 25 January 2001, he joined Atlético Madrid, then in the Segunda División.

After only eleven games in Spain, he returned to the Bundesliga on 6 December 2001, signing for Hamburger SV until the end of the season with the option to extend until June 2005. He returned to Sion on a three-year contract on 23 August 2007, after losing first-choice status with Hamburg under manager Huub Stevens following a period of injury.

Wicky signed on a free transfer with Los Angeles–based Major League Soccer side Chivas USA in February 2008. Wicky made his debut as a substitute in Chivas' season opener against Dallas on 30 March. His season was cut short due to ankle injury, making just five appearances in his first MLS season. He underwent surgery to repair the injury in July 2008 and was placed on the team's season-ending injury list on 15 September.

On 26 January 2009, Chivas USA announced that they had re-signed Wicky to a one-year deal. Five weeks later, on 3 March, he announced his retirement from professional football, citing "personal reasons."

== International career ==
Internationally, Wicky was part of the Swiss national teams at Euro 96 and Euro 2004 as well as at the 2006 World Cup.

In 75 appearances, he scored one goal, to open a 3–1 win away to the Faroe Islands in qualification for the last of those tournaments on 4 June 2005.

=== International goals ===
Scores and results list Switzerland's goal tally first, score column indicates score after each Wicky goal.

List of international goals scored by Raphaël Wicky
No.	Date	Venue	Opponent	Score	Result	Competition
1	4 June 2005	Svangaskarð, Toftir, Faroe Islands	Faroe Islands	1–0	3–1	2006 FIFA World Cup qualification

== Managerial career ==
Upon retiring as a player, Wicky coached the youth teams of Thun in 2009 and a year later Servette.

In 2013, he moved into the youth ranks of Basel. He became first-team manager on 21 April 2017, replacing Urs Fischer after a boardroom change. Days later, the team wrapped up an eighth consecutive league title, and on 25 May won the Swiss Cup with a 3–0 victory over Sion at the Stade de Genève. On 26 July 2018, having finished as runner-up in the domestic league and having been eliminated in the semifinal of the cup as well as having started the new season poorly, with elimination by PAOK in the 2nd qualifying round of the Champions League, he was dismissed.

On 8 March 2019, Wicky was named the head coach of the United States Under-17 Men's National Team. On 27 December 2019, he was named the head coach of Major League Soccer side Chicago Fire. He missed the MLS Cup playoffs by one point in 2020, and was dismissed on 30 September 2021.

On 2 June 2022, his return to the Swiss Super League as the new head coach of Young Boys was announced.

His contract was terminated by Young Boys on 4 March 2024. This came following a string of poor results, including elimination from the UEFA Europa League to Sporting CP and from the Swiss Cup to Swiss Challenge League side Sion, as well as seeing their lead at the top of the Swiss Super League decline to just one point ahead of Servette.

On 5 January 2026, Wicky was named as the new head coach of Sporting Kansas City, having signed a two-and-a-half-year contract through the 2027–28 MLS season with a club option for the 2028–29 campaign. Wicky was sacked by Sporting Kansas City on 9 November following a last place finish in the Western Conference by the end of the regular season.

== Managerial statistics ==
As of match played 7 November 2026

Managerial record by team and tenure
Team	Nat.	From	To	Record								Ref.
Team	Nat.	From	To	G	W	D	L	GF	GA	GD	Win %	Ref.
Basel	(Switzerland)	3 June 2017	26 July 2018	51	29	9	13	94	54	+40	56.86	
United States U17	(United States)	8 March 2019	27 December 2019	17	9	2	6	39	27	+12	52.94	
Chicago Fire	(United States)	27 December 2019	29 September 2021	52	12	14	26	63	85	−22	23.08	
Young Boys	(Switzerland)	2 June 2022	4 March 2024	100	59	22	19	218	93	+125	59.00	
Sporting Kansas City	(United States)	5 January 2026	9 November 2026	35	7	5	23	40	84	−44	20.00	
Total				255	116	52	87	454	343	+111	45.49	

== Honours ==
=== Player ===
Sion

- Swiss Championship: 1996–97
- Swiss Cup: 1994–95, 1995–96, 1996–97

Werder Bremen

- DFB-Pokal: 1998–99; runner-up 1999–2000
- DFL-Ligapokal runner-up: 1999
- UEFA Intertoto Cup: 1998

Hamburger SV

- DFL-Ligapokal: 2003
- UEFA Intertoto Cup: 2005

=== Manager ===
Young Boys

- Swiss Super League: 2022–23
- Swiss Cup: 2022–23
