= 2016–17 Swiss Super League =

120th season of top-tier Swiss football

Swiss Super League
- Season: 2016–17
- Dates: 23 July 2016 – 2 June 2017
- Champions: Basel; 20th title 8th consecutive title
- Relegated: Vaduz
- Champions League: Basel; Young Boys
- Europa League: Lugano; Sion; Luzern; Vaduz
- Matches: 180
- Goals: 582 (3.23 per match)
- Top goalscorer: Seydou Doumbia (20 goals)
- Biggest home win: Basel 6–0 Vaduz (19 November 2016)
- Biggest away win: Vaduz 1–5 Basel (31 July 2016)
- Highest scoring: Young Boys 7–2 Lausanne-Sport (20 August 2016)
- Longest winning run: Basel (9 games)
- Longest unbeaten run: Basel (16 games)
- Longest winless run: Lausanne-Sport (14 games)
- Longest losing run: Lausanne-Sport (7 games)
- Highest attendance: 31,120; Young Boys 4–1 Thun (6 August 2016)
- Total attendance: 1,789,873
- Average attendance: 9,944

The 2016–17 Swiss Super League, also known as the Raiffeisen Super League for sponsoring purposes, was the 120th season of top-tier football in Switzerland and the 14th in the current format. Basel were the defending champions. The fixtures were published on 17 June 2016.

A total of 10 teams competed in the league: the 9 best teams from the 2015–16 season and the 2015–16 Swiss Challenge League champion Lausanne-Sport. The season started on the weekend of 23 and 24 July 2016 and ended on 2 June 2017.

On 28 April 2017, Basel won their 20th league title following their 2–1 away win against Luzern, with six games to spare. It is also their 8th consecutive title.

== Teams ==
=== Stadia and locations ===
Location of the 2016–17 Swiss Super League teams

Club	Location	Stadium	Capacity
Basel	Basel	St. Jakob-Park	38,512
Grasshopper	Zürich	Letzigrund	23,605
Lausanne	Lausanne	Pontaise	15,850
Lugano	Lugano	Stadio Cornaredo	10,500
Luzern	Lucerne	Swissporarena	17,500
Sion	Sion	Stade Tourbillon	16,500
St. Gallen	St. Gallen	kybunpark	19,694
Thun	Thun	Stockhorn Arena	10,000
Vaduz	(Liechtenstein) Vaduz	Rheinpark Stadion	7,584
Young Boys	Bern	Stade de Suisse	31,783

- This will be the first season since 1989–90 that there is only one club from Zürich to play in the first tier, because FC Zürich finished in last position and were relegated at the end of the 2015–16 season.

=== Personnel ===
Team	Manager	Captain	Kit manufacturer	Shirt sponsor
Basel	(Switzerland) Urs Fischer	(Argentina) Matías Delgado	Adidas	Novartis
Grasshopper	(Argentina) Carlos Bernegger	(Israel) Munas Dabbur^{1}	Puma	Ducksch&Anliker/Priora/Kinnarps
Lausanne-Sport	(Switzerland) Fabio Celestini	(Italy) Andrea Maccoppi^{2}	Adidas	BCV
Lugano	(Italy) Paolo Tramezzani	(Switzerland) Antoine Rey	Acerbis	AIL SA
Luzern	(Germany) Markus Babbel	(Switzerland) Claudio Lustenberger	Adidas	Otto's
Sion	(Switzerland) Sébastien Fournier	(Montenegro) Elsad Zverotić	Erreà	AFX Group
St. Gallen	(Switzerland) Giorgio Contini	(Switzerland) Martin Angha	Jako	St.Galler Kantonalbank
Thun	(Switzerland) Mauro Lustrinelli	(Switzerland) Dennis Hediger	Nike	Panorama Center/Schneider Software
(Liechtenstein) Vaduz	(Germany) Roland Vrabec	(Liechtenstein) Franz Burgmeier	Adidas	Liechtensteinische Landesbank
Young Boys	(Austria) Adi Hütter	(Switzerland) Steve von Bergen	Nike	Honda

- ^{1}Dabbur, who was on loan from Red Bull Salzburg, was called back by his parent club before he could play the last game of the season with Grasshopper.
- ^{2}The manager decided to give the captaincy to Maccoppi near the end of the season. Before that, Olivier Custodio was the captain.

=== Managerial changes ===
Team	Outgoing manager	Manner of departure	Date of departure	Position in table	Incoming manager	Date of appointment
Lugano	(Czech Republic) Zdenek Zeman	End of contract	4 June 2016	Pre-season	(Italy) Andrea Manzo (interim)	17 June 2016
Sion	(France) Didier Tholot	Mutual consent	12 August 2016	10th	(Germany) Peter Zeidler	22 August 2016
Lugano	(Italy) Andrea Manzo	Sacked	19 December 2016	8th	(Italy) Paolo Tramezzani	20 December 2016
Vaduz	(Switzerland) Giorgio Contini	Mutual consent	7 March 2017	10th	(Germany) Roland Vrabec	22 March 2017
Grasshopper	(Switzerland) Pierluigi Tami	Sacked	12 March 2017	8th	(Argentina) Carlos Bernegger	12 March 2017
Thun	(Luxembourg) Jeff Saibene	Signed by Arminia Bielefeld	19 March 2017	7th	(Switzerland) Mauro Lustrinelli (interim)	19 March 2017
Sion	(Germany) Peter Zeidler	"Rested" pending further decision by the board	25 April 2017	3rd	(Switzerland) Sébastien Fournier	25 April 2017
Sion	(Germany) Peter Zeidler	Mutual consent	30 May 2017	4th	(Switzerland) Sébastien Fournier	25 April 2017
St. Gallen	(Germany) Josef Zinnbauer	Sacked	4 May 2017	8th	(Switzerland) Giorgio Contini	4 May 2017

== League table ==
Pos	Team	Pld	W	D	L	GF	GA	GD	Pts	Qualification or relegation
1	Basel (C)	36	26	8	2	92	35	+57	86	Qualification for the Champions League group stage
2	Young Boys	36	20	9	7	72	44	+28	69	Qualification for the Champions League third qualifying round
3	Lugano	36	15	8	13	52	61	−9	53	Qualification for the Europa League group stage (Note: Since the winners of the 2016–17 Swiss Cup, Basel, qualified for European competition based on league position, the spot awarded to the Swiss Cup winners (Europa League group stage) was passed to the third-placed team, the spot awarded to the third-placed team was passed to the fourth-placed team, and the spot awarded to the fourth-placed team was passed to the fifth-placed team.)
4	Sion	36	15	6	15	60	55	+5	51	Qualification for the Europa League third qualifying round
5	Luzern	36	14	8	14	62	66	−4	50	Qualification for the Europa League second qualifying round
6	Thun	36	11	12	13	58	63	−5	45	
7	St. Gallen	36	11	8	17	43	57	−14	41	
8	Grasshopper	36	10	8	18	47	61	−14	38	
9	Lausanne-Sport	36	9	8	19	51	62	−11	35	
10	Vaduz (R)	36	7	9	20	45	78	−33	30	Qualification for the Europa League first qualifying round and relegation to Challenge League (Note: Vaduz qualified for the UEFA Europa League first qualifying round by winning the 2016–17 Liechtenstein Cup.)

Source: Swiss Super League, Soccerway
Rules for classification: 1) Points; 2) Goal difference; 3) Goals scored; 4) Head-to-head points; 5) Draw.
(C) Champions; (R) Relegated

=== Positions by round ===
Team ╲ Round	1	2	3	4	5	6	7	8	9	10	11	12	13	14	15	16	17	18	19	20	21	22	23	24	25	26	27	28	29	30	31	32	33	34	35	36
Basel	1	1	1	1	1	1	1	1	1	1	1	1	1	1	1	1	1	1	1	1	1	1	1	1	1	1	1	1	1	1	1	1	1	1	1	1
Young Boys	3	4	2	4	3	3	2	2	2	3	4	3	3	3	2	2	2	2	2	2	2	2	2	2	2	2	2	2	2	2	2	2	2	2	2	2
Lugano	7	5	7	5	7	6	5	4	4	6	6	6	6	7	8	8	8	8	9	7	7	6	6	6	6	6	5	5	5	5	4	4	4	3	3	3
Sion	10	6	9	10	10	9	7	6	7	5	3	2	2	2	3	3	4	3	4	4	3	3	3	3	3	3	3	3	3	3	3	3	3	4	4	4
Luzern	4	2	3	2	2	2	3	3	5	7	7	5	4	4	4	4	3	4	3	3	4	4	4	4	4	4	4	4	4	4	5	5	5	5	5	5
Thun	5	7	10	6	8	10	10	10	10	10	10	8	8	8	9	9	9	9	8	9	8	7	7	7	7	7	8	9	9	7	7	7	6	6	6	6
St. Gallen	9	10	8	9	9	8	9	8	8	8	9	10	9	9	7	6	6	6	6	5	5	5	5	5	5	5	6	6	7	8	8	8	8	7	7	7
Grasshopper Club Zürich	2	3	6	8	6	4	6	7	6	4	5	7	7	6	6	5	5	5	5	6	6	8	8	8	9	9	9	7	6	6	6	6	7	8	8	8
Lausanne-Sport	8	8	4	3	5	5	4	5	3	2	2	4	5	5	5	7	7	7	7	8	9	9	9	10	8	8	7	8	8	9	9	9	9	9	9	9
Vaduz	6	9	5	7	4	7	8	9	9	9	8	9	10	10	10	10	10	10	10	10	10	10	10	9	10	10	10	10	10	10	10	10	10	10	10	10

2017–18 UEFA Champions League group stage
2017–18 Champions League third qualifying round
2017–18 Europa League third qualifying round
2017–18 Europa League second qualifying round
Relegation to 2017–18 Swiss Challenge League

Source: Swiss Football League

Note: The table lists the positions of teams after completion of each round. In order to preserve chronological evolution, any postponed matches are not included in the round at which they were originally scheduled, but added to the round after which they were actually played. For example, if a match is scheduled for matchday 13, but then postponed and played between days 16 and 17, it will be added to the standings for day 16.

== Results ==
=== First and Second Round ===
Home \ Away	BAS	GRA	LS	LUG	LUZ	SIO	StG	THU	VAD	YB
Basel	—	3–1	2–1	4–1	3–0	3–0	1–0	1–1	6–0	3–0
Grasshopper	0–2	—	2–0	0–0	3–2	2–1	2–2	1–1	2–1	4–1
Lausanne-Sport	1–2	1–2	—	4–1	2–3	0–2	1–0	4–4	5–0	1–2
Lugano	2–2	2–0	1–1	—	1–2	3–1	2–3	1–1	0–2	0–0
Luzern	2–3	4–3	1–3	2–1	—	2–2	3–0	3–0	3–0	2–2
Sion	1–2	4–2	1–3	5–1	3–1	—	2–1	1–0	3–1	0–0
St. Gallen	1–3	2–1	2–0	0–2	3–0	2–1	—	0–0	0–2	0–2
Thun	0–3	2–1	1–0	2–2	1–2	2–3	1–2	—	1–1	2–3
Vaduz	1–5	0–0	1–1	5–1	1–3	2–5	2–0	2–3	—	0–0
Young Boys	3–1	4–0	7–2	1–2	2–1	4–3	2–2	4–1	5–0	—

Source: Swiss Super League (in French)
Legend: Blue = home team win; Yellow = draw; Red = away team win.

=== Third and Fourth Round ===
Home \ Away	BAS	GRA	LS	LUG	LUZ	SIO	StG	THU	VAD	YB
Basel	—	1–0	4–3	4–0	3–1	2–2	4–1	3–3	2–2	1–1
Grasshopper	1–3	—	1–1	0–1	4–1	0–1	3–1	0–1	1–2	2–3
Lausanne-Sport	0–4	0–0	—	1–2	4–4	0–1	0–1	0–0	1–3	0–0
Lugano	2–2	3–0	2–1	—	0–1	4–2	3–2	2–1	2–1	0–2
Luzern	1–2	1–1	0–3	0–2	—	0–0	2–0	1–1	2–2	4–1
Sion	0–1	1–1	0–1	2–0	2–3	—	1–2	2–1	4–2	0–1
St. Gallen	0–3	4–1	2–1	0–1	1–1	1–1	—	1–2	2–0	0–2
Thun	0–2	3–1	2–4	5–2	3–1	2–1	2–2	—	4–3	0–0
Vaduz	1–1	2–4	0–1	1–1	0–2	0–1	1–1	1–3	—	1–0
Young Boys	2–1	0–1	2–0	1–2	4–1	3–1	2–2	3–2	3–2	—

Source: Swiss Super League (in French)
Legend: Blue = home team win; Yellow = draw; Red = away team win.

== Season statistics ==
=== Top goalscorers ===
Rank	Player	Club	Goals
1	(Ivory Coast) Seydou Doumbia	Basel	20
2	(France) Guillaume Hoarau	Young Boys	18
3	(North Macedonia) Ezgjan Alioski	Lugano	16
4	(Serbia) Dejan Sorgić	Thun	15
4	(Democratic Republic of the Congo) Chadrac Akolo	Sion	15
6	(Switzerland) Marco Schneuwly	Luzern	14
6	(Brazil) Caio	Grasshopper	14
8	(Austria) Marc Janko	Basel	13
9	(Switzerland) Albian Ajeti	St. Gallen	10
9	(Argentina) Matías Delgado	Basel	10
9	(Norway) Mohamed Elyounoussi	Basel	10
9	(Switzerland) Christian Fassnacht	Thun	10

=== Hat-tricks ===
Player	For	Against	Result	Date
(Switzerland) Marco Mathys	Vaduz	Lugano	5–1 (H)	27 November 2016
(Norway) Mohamed Elyounoussi	Basel	Lugano	4–0 (H)	4 February 2017
(Switzerland) Nassim Ben Khalifa	Lausanne-Sport	Luzern	4–4 (H)	5 February 2017
(Switzerland) Nassim Ben Khalifa	Lausanne-Sport	Thun	4–2 (A)	8 April 2017
(North Macedonia) Ezgjan Alioski	Lugano	Sion	4–2 (H)	9 April 2017
(Serbia) Dejan Sorgić	Thun	Basel	3–3 (A)	14 May 2017

(H) – Home; (A) – Away

== Awards ==
=== Annual awards ===
Award	Winner	Club
Player of the Season	(France) Guillaume Hoarau	Young Boys
«Mein Spieler» Fans' Player of the Year	(France) Guillaume Hoarau	Young Boys
Young Player of the Season	(Switzerland) Denis Zakaria	Young Boys
Coach of the Season	(Switzerland) Fabio Celestini	Lausanne-Sport
Goal of the Season	(Portugal) Carlitos	Sion

Team of the Year
Goalkeeper	(Czech Republic) Vaclik (Basel)			
Defence	(Switzerland) Michael Lang (Basel)	(Switzerland) Marek Suchý (Basel)	(Switzerland) Reto Ziegler (Sion)	(Czech Republic) Jan Lecjaks (Young Boys)
Midfield	(North Macedonia) Ezgjan Alioski (Lugano)	(Switzerland) Denis Zakaria (Young Boys)	(Argentina) Matías Emilio Delgado (Basel)	(Portugal) Carlitos (Sion)
Attack	(Switzerland) Marco Schneuwly (Luzern)		(France) Guillaume Hoarau (Young Boys)	

== Attendance ==
Team	Total	Average
Basel	476,705	26,484
Young Boys	325,316	18,073
St. Gallen	225,592	12,533
Luzern	196,557	10,920
Sion	165,100	9,172
Thun	97,288	5,405
Grasshopper	90,200	5,011
Lausanne-Sport	80,722	4,485
Vaduz	73,549	4,086
Lugano	72,498	4,027
League total	1,803,518	10,020
