= 2019–20 FC Basel season =

FC Basel
2019–20 season
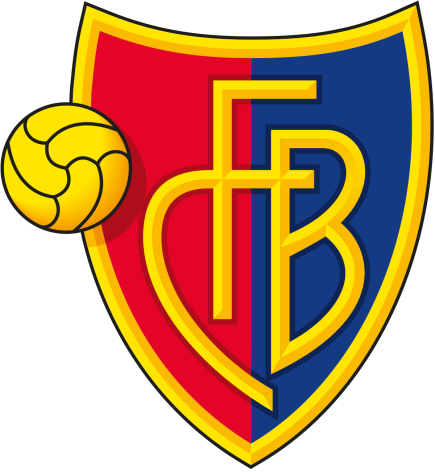
- Owner: FCB Holding
- Chairman: Bernhard Burgener
- Manager: Marcel Koller
- Ground: St. Jakob-Park, Basel, Switzerland
- Super League: 3rd
- Swiss Cup: Runners-up
- Europa League: Quarter-finals
- Top goalscorer: League: Arthur Cabral (14); All: Arthur Cabral (18)
- Highest home attendance: 30,965 on 1 December 2019 vs Young Boys
- Lowest home attendance: 1,000 on 28 June, 4/11/14/26 July and 3 August 2020
- Average home league attendance: 15,117
Home colours	Away colours	Third colours

The 2019–20 FC Basel season was the 126th season in the club's history and the 25th consecutive season in the top flight of Swiss football following their promotion in the 1993–94 season. The domestic league season started on the weekend of 19–21 July 2019. Basel were runners-up in the previous Super League season and were therefore qualified for 2019–20 UEFA Champions League second qualifying round. Basel competed in round 1 of the 2019–20 Swiss Cup on 17 August 2019.

== Club ==
=== Management ===
Marcel Koller was the first team manager, Thomas Janeschitz and Carlos Bernegger were his assistants and Massimo Colomba was Goalkeeper Coach.

Position	Staff
Manager	(Switzerland) Marcel Koller
Assistant manager	(Austria) Thomas Janeschitz
Assistant manager	(Switzerland) Carlos Bernegger
Goalkeeper Coach	(Switzerland) Massimo Colomba
Team leader	(Switzerland) Gustav Nussbaumer
Youth Team Coach	(Switzerland) Arjan Peço
Youth Team Co-Coach	(Switzerland) Toni Membrino
Youth Team Co-Coach	(Switzerland) Michaël Bauch

Source: FCB Official Site

=== Further information ===
The FC Basel 125th annual general meeting took place on Tuesday 4 June 2019. The board of directors under president Bernhard Burgener were sport director Marco Streller, financial manager Peter von Büren, marketing manager Patrick Jost, as well as the three directors Reto Baumgartner, Dominik Donzé and Benno Kaiser who remained on the board. Roland Heri was voted onto the board as chief executive director. On 14 June Streller quit his job as sportdirector. On 20 June Ruedi Zbinden was named as his successor.

Chairman	(Switzerland) Bernhard Burgener
Sport director	(Switzerland) Marco Streller until 14 June 2019 (Switzerland) Ruedi Zbinden from 20 June 2019
Chief operating officer	(Switzerland) Roland Heri
Finances	(Switzerland) Peter von Büren
Marketing	(Switzerland) Patrick Jost
Director	(Switzerland) Reto Baumgartner
Director	(Switzerland) Dominik Donzé
Director	(Switzerland) Benno Kaiser
Ground (capacity and dimensions)	St. Jakob-Park (38,512 (37,500 for international matches) / 120x80 m)

Updated to match played 22 June 2019
Source: FCB Official Site

== Overview ==
=== Offseason and preseason ===
Manager Marcel Koller had a two-year contract. He was nearly fired by sport director Marco Streller, but the club owner and chairman Bernhard Burgener did not agree so Streller quit his job and Koller continued as manager. There were only a few changes in the squad during the summer break. Omar Alderete was signed in from Huracán, Edon Zhegrova was on loan from Genk and Arthur Cabral was first loaned and then taken over from Palmeiras Marek Suchý and Serey Dié left the club due to end of contract. Dimitri Oberlin was loaned out to Empoli, Aldo Kalulu to Swansea City and Dominik Schmid to Wil until the end of the season. Soon after the season started on 8 August Albian Ajeti was sold to West Ham United.

== The Campaign ==
=== Domestic League ===
The season started on the weekend of 20–21 July 2019. Basel's priority aim for the new season is to win the league championship. The season started out well, despite the fact that Basel lost their first home game at St. Jakob-Park against St. Gallen, after 11 rounds they were leading the table having won eight of these rounds. There after, however, they were defeated in three consecutive away games and thus slipped to second position in the table before the winter break. At the start of the second half of season the team suffered two straight off defeats against reigning Swiss champions Young Boys and the team St. Gallen who then rose to the top of the league table. Following a home defeat against bottom of the table Thun, Basel lost contact to the top two teams. On 28 February Swiss Football League postponed all Super and Challenge League matches of matchdays 24, 25 and 26. Postponement came after the Swiss Federal Council banned all major events until 15 March due to the COVID-19 outbreak.

On 13 March Super and Challenge League football was halted until mid June. Following this COVID-19 break Basel could not close the gap to the table top and therefore ended their season in third position, 14 points behind defending champions Young Boys who successfully retained the title.

Arthur Cabral was the team's top league goal scorer, he netted 14 goals. Kemal Ademi was the team's second best league goal scorer with 13, Fabian Frei scored 10 goals and Valentin Stocker netted eight. Fabian Frei and Eray Cömert were the two players with the most appearances, they both played 33 of the 36 league matches. Goalkeeper Jonas Omlin and the two defenders Silvan Widmer and Taulant Xhaka each played 32 league matches.

=== Domestic Cup ===
Basel's clear aim for the cup is to win the title. The first round of the Swiss Cup was played on the week-end 16/17/18 August. Up until the quarter-finals the home advantage was granted to the team from the lower league. Basel play their first-round game on 18 August away from home against sixth tier Pully Football. Despite a straight red card against Raoul Petretta Basel won the game by four goals to one. In round 2 Basel were drawn away against FC Meyrin. Basel won 3–0 and advanced to the next round. In round 3 Basel were drawn away against Stade Lausanne, Basel won this game 2–1 and advanced to the quarter-final. The quarter-final against Lausanne-Sport was originally scheduled for 3 March, but eventually played on 14 June. Shortly after half time Cabral scored twice to put Basel two up, but Andi Zeqiri and Joël Geissmann put Lausanne level. In the 105th minute Silvan Widmer scored and Basel won the game 3–2 after extra time.

The semi-final was fixed for 25 August and Basel were drawn at home in the St. Jakob-Park against lower tier Winterthur. This was the club's first home game in the cup for two years. Basel started well into the game, capitain Valentin Stocker and Silvan Widmer put Basel two up after just five minutes, then Ricky van Wolfswinkel added a third after 22 minutes. The former Basel player Roman Buess managed to pull a goal back before half time. In the second half Afimico Pululu, again Van Wolfswinkel and Fabian Frei managed three more goals to make it a definitive 6–1 win. The final was played on 30 August in the Stadion Wankdorf in Bern and the opponents were BSC Young Boys. Basel took a lead through Omar Alderete before half time, but Jean-Pierre Nsame equalised after the half time break. In the last minute of the match Marvin Spielmann scored the winner. Basel were defeated.

=== Champions League ===
Basel were qualified for the 2019–20 UEFA Champions League in the qualifying phase (League Path) in the second qualifying round. Here they were drawn against PSV Eindhoven from the Netherlands and won on the away goals rule after the two games ended with a 4–4 aggregate score.

After winning the second qualifying round, Basel qualified for the third qualifying round. The draw for this round was held on 22 July 2019 and Basel were drawn against Austrian team LASK. But Basel lost both legs and were knocked out of the competition.

=== Europa League ===
Following their elimination in the UEFA Champions League qualifying phase, Basel were qualified for the Europa League group stage. Here they were drawn into group C together with Russian team Krasnodar, Turkish team Trabzonspor and the Spanish team Getafe. Basel won their three group home games, they also won the match in Spain, drew the away match in Turkey but were defeated in their match in Russia. With 13 points they were top place in the group and therefore advanced to the knockout phase as seeded team.

The Round of 32 started on 20 February 2020 and the draw gave them the first leg in Nicosia against APOEL. Raoul Petretta scored Basel's first after 16 minutes, Valentin Stocker added a second eight minutes into the second half and Arthur Cabral scored in the 66th minute to give them a 3–0 victory. It was a comfortable night for the visitors who capitalised on some poor defending from the hosts to take a commanding lead back to Switzerland. The return match was one week later in the St. Jakob-Park. In the 38th minute Fabian Frei converted the penalty given after Nicholas Ioannou had fouled captain Valentin Stocker. This remained as end-result and Basel won 4–0 on aggregate. In the Round of 16 Basel were drawn in the first leg with an away match in Germany against Eintracht Frankfurt and was won 3–0, the goals coming from Samuele Campo, Kevin Bua and Fabian Frei. The second leg, originally scheduled to be played on 19 March 2020, 21:00 CET in Basel, was meant to be played at Waldstadion, but was indefinitely postponed due to an outbreak of COVID-19 in Switzerland. The match was rescheduled on 17 June to 6 August. Eventually it took place on 6 August 2020. Fabian Frei scored the only goal of the match and Basel won 4–0 on aggregate.

On 17 June 2020, UEFA announced that due to the COVID-19 pandemic in Europe, the final stages of the competition would feature a format change. The quarter-finals, semi-finals and final would be played in a single-leg format from 10 to 21 August 2020 in the German cities of Cologne, Düsseldorf, Duisburg and Gelsenkirchen. The matches were tentatively played behind closed doors. Basel were drawn against Shakhtar Donetsk and was played in the Arena AufSchalke in Gelsenkirchen. Shakhtar Donetsk took an early lead, Júnior Moraes in the second minute and Taison doubled up in the 22nd. Late in the second half Alan Patrick added a third, 75th minute from the penalty spot, and in the 88th minute Dodô made in four. During added time Ricky van Wolfswinkel pulled a goal back, but the result was explicit. Shakhtar Donetsk advanced to the semi-finals, but were defeated here by Inter Milan.

== Players ==
=== First team squad ===
The following is the list of the Basel first team squad. It also includes players that were in the squad the day the season started on 19 July 2019 but subsequently left the club after that date.

As of 6 July 2019

Note: Flags indicate national team as defined under FIFA eligibility rules; some limited exceptions apply. Players may hold more than one non-FIFA nationality.

No.	Pos.	Nation	Player
1	GK	SUI	Jonas Omlin (vice-captain)
3	DF	GRE	Konstantinos Dimitriou
4	DF	SUI	Eray Cömert
5	DF	SUI	Silvan Widmer
6	DF	PAR	Omar Alderete
7	MF	SUI	Luca Zuffi
8	MF	SRB	Zdravko Kuzmanović
9	FW	NED	Ricky van Wolfswinkel
10	MF	SUI	Samuele Campo
11	FW	SUI	Noah Okafor
13	GK	SRB	Đorđe Nikolić
14	MF	SUI	Valentin Stocker (captain)
15	DF	PAR	Blás Riveros
18	FW	SUI	Julian Von Moos
19	FW	ANG	Afimico Pululu

No.	Pos.	Nation	Player
20	MF	SUI	Fabian Frei
21	MF	SUI	Jasper van der Werff
22	FW	SUI	Albian Ajeti
23	DF	COL	Éder Álvarez Balanta
23	MF	SUI	Lirik Vishi (from U-21)
26	MF	FRA	Aldo Kalulu
28	DF	ITA	Raoul Petretta
30	MF	KOS	Edon Zhegrova (on loan from Genk)
32	MF	SUI	Yannick Marchand
33	MF	SUI	Kevin Bua
34	MF	ALB	Taulant Xhaka (vice-captain)
36	MF	SUI	Robin Huser
43	DF	SUI	Yves Kaiser
44	GK	SUI	Jozef Pukaj
98	FW	BRA	Arthur Cabral (from Palmeiras)
99	FW	GER	Kemal Ademi

==== Other players under contract ====
Note: Flags indicate national team as defined under FIFA eligibility rules; some limited exceptions apply. Players may hold more than one non-FIFA nationality.

No. / Pos. / Nation / Player; 29 / DF / SUI / Alessandro Stabile	No. / Pos. / Nation / Player; 41 / FW / SUI / Tician Tushi

==== Out on loan ====
Note: Flags indicate national team as defined under FIFA eligibility rules; some limited exceptions apply. Players may hold more than one non-FIFA nationality.

No.	Pos.	Nation	Player
19	FW	SUI	Dimitri Oberlin (at Zulte Waregem until 30 June 2020)
26	MF	FRA	Aldo Kalulu (at Swansea City until 30 June 2020)
31	MF	SUI	Dominik Schmid (at Wil until 30 June 2020)

No.	Pos.	Nation	Player
35	DF	POR	Pedro Pacheco (at Rapperswil-Jona until 30 June 2019)
38	MF	SUI	Martin Liechti (at Aarau until 30 June 2019)
—	MF	KOS	Gëzim Pepsi (at Aarau until 30 June 2020)

=== Transfers summer 2019 ===
==== In ====
6	DF	PAR	Omar Alderete (from Huracán)
37	FW	FRA	Afimico Pululu (returned end of loan)
98	FW	BRA	Arthur Cabral (on loan from Palmeiras)

==== Out ====
17	DF	CZE	Marek Suchý (End of contract)
19	FW	SUI	Dimitri Oberlin (out on loan to Empoli)
20	MF	CIV	Serey Dié (End of contract)

=== Transfers winter 2019–20 ===
==== In ====
21	MF	SUI	Jasper van der Werff

== Results and fixtures ==
Kickoff times are in CET.

=== Legend ===
Win Draw Loss Postponed

=== Friendly matches ===
==== Preseason ====
22 June 2019 Pre-season	Basel	4–2	Kriens	Youth-Campus, Basel
15:00	Pululu 53' von Moos 56'; Pululu 76'; Pululu 87'	FCB Report	19' Dzonlagic; 34' Hoxha	Attendance: 600; Referee: Nico Gianforte

26 June 2019 Pre-season	TSV 1860 Munich	1–5	Basel	Waldstadion Germering-Unterpfaffenhofen
19:00	Wein (yellow card) 31'; Seferings (yellow card) 35'; Dressel 61' (1:3); Böhnlein (yellow card) 63'	FCB Report	13' (0:1) Campo; (yellow card) 16' Petretta; 32' (0:2) Bua; 42' (0:3) F. Frei; 67' (1:4) Zhegrova (1:5) Tushi	Attendance: 1,100; Referee: Tobias Schultes Betzigau

3 July 2019 Pre-season	1. FC Nürnberg	0–4	Basel	Sportpark am Amperknie Allershausen
19:00		FCB Report	54' (0:1) Riveros; 64' (0:2) Widmer; 74' (pen.) Pululu; 75' (0:4) Pululu	Attendance: 600; Referee: Michael Bacher

9 July 2019 Pre-season	Basel	4–1	Lausanne-Sport	Waldäcker, Herzogenbuchsee
18:00	Al. Ajeti 7' (1:0); Cömert (yellow card) 32'; F. Frei 56' (2:0); Riveros 76' (3:1); Ademi 90' (4:1)	FCB Report	(yellow card) 34' Nanizayamo; (yellow card) 65' Cabral; 69' (2:1) Oliveira	Attendance: 500; Referee: Alessandro Dudic

13 July 2019 Pre-season	Basel	2–3	VfB Stuttgart	St. Jakob-Park, Basel
20:15	Grözinger 3' (o.g. 1:0); Balanta (yellow card) 33' van Wolfswinkel 35' (2:1); Stocker (yellow card) 88'	FCB report	(yellow card) 12' Karazor; 28' (1:1) Ascacíbar; (yellow card) 33' Didavi; 43' (2:2) Kamiński; 71' (2:3) González	Attendance: 9,867; Referee: Lionel Tschudi (Neuchâtel)

==== Winter break ====
10 January 2020 Test	Basel	3–2	Fortuna Düsseldorf	Marbella Football Center, Marbella
16:00	Campo 25'; Alderete (yellow card) 31'; Widmer 36'; Stocker 63'	FCB report	Tekpetey 9'; Thommy 43'	Attendance: 190; Referee: José María Aranda Delgado

13 January 2020 Test	Basel	0–2	VfB Stuttgart	La Quinta Football Fields, Marbella
16:00		FCB report	49' González; 51' Al Ghaddioui	Attendance: 150; Referee: Manuel Sánchez Trobar

16 January 2020 Test	Basel	1–0	FCSB	Estadio Municipal de Marbella, Marbella
10:30	Zhegrova 85'	FCB report	Răzvan Oaidă (yellow card) 41'	Attendance: 40; Referee: Guillermo Paradas Mazuela

19 January 2020 Test	Basel	0–2	Hamburger SV	St. Jakob-Park, Basel
15:00		FCB report	10' Jeremy Dudziak; (yellow card) 66' David; 71' Sonny Kittel	Attendance: 6,489; Referee: Lukas Fähndrich

=== Swiss Super League ===
==== First half of season ====
19 July 2019 Round 1	Sion	1–4	Basel	Stade Tourbillon, Sion
20:00	Patrick 35'; Zock (yellow card) 68'	Report	Ajeti 22'; Zuffi 52'; Stocker (yellow card) 55', (goal) 82'; Cömert (yellow card) 60'; Okafor (yellow card) 71'; Mitryushkin 72' (o.g.)	Attendance: 11,000; Referee: (Switzerland) Sandro Schärer

27 July 2019 Round 2	Basel	1–2	St. Gallen	St. Jakob-Park, Basel
19:00	Xhaka (yellow card) 20'; Cömert (yellow card) 51'; Ademi 57'	Report	Görtler (yellow card) 6'; Itten 25', 80' (pen.); Muheim (yellow card) 57'; Stojanović (yellow card) 85'; Guillemenot (yellow card) 86'; Fabiano (yellow card) 90+1'	Attendance: 21,932; Referee: (Switzerland) Adrien Jaccottet

3 August 2019 Round 3	Thun	2–3	Basel	Stockhorn Arena, Thun
19:00	Rapp 7'; Hefti (yellow card) 29'; Fatkič (yellow card) 42'; Kablan (yellow card) 45+3'; Bigler (yellow card) 61'; Stillhart 71'	Report	Widmer 43'; Frei 58'; Stocker 86'; Álvarez (yellow card) 90'	Attendance: 6,266; Referee: (Switzerland) Stephan Klossner

10 August 2019 Round 4	Basel	3–1	Servette	St. Jakob-Park, Basel
19:00	Rouiller 5' (o.g.); Ademi (yellow card) 31', (goal) 41'; Bua 81'	Report	Wüthrich 19'; Tasar (yellow card) 44'; Imeri (yellow card) 87'	Attendance: 21,532; Referee: (Switzerland) Alessandro Dudic

24 August 2019 Round 5	Xamax	0–3	Basel	Stade de la Maladière, Neuchâtel
19:00		FCB report	Balanta (yellow card) 27'; F. Frei 55' (0:1); Alderete (yellow card) 57'; F. Frei (yellow card) 67'; Ademi 70' (0:2); Stocker 87' (0:3)	Attendance: 6,364; Referee: (Switzerland) Fedayi San (Gebenstorf)

1 September 2019 Round 6	Basel	2–1	Lugano	St. Jakob-Park, Basel
16:00	Bua (yellow card) 21'; Ademi 27', 48'; Kuzmanović (yellow card) 82'	FCB report	Marić (yellow card) 3'; Holender (yellow card) 18'; Lavanchy (yellow card) 33'; Rodríguez (yellow card) 85'; Dalmonte 87'	Attendance: 21,912; Referee: (Switzerland) Lukas Fahndrich

22 September 2019 Round 7	Young Boys	1–1	Basel	Stade de Suisse, Bern
16:00	Sørensen (yellow card) 24'; Assalé (yellow card) 26'; Nsame 59'; Lustenberger (yellow card) 85'	FCB report	Widmer 5'; Cabral (yellow card) 63'	Attendance: 31,120; Referee: (Switzerland) Sandro Schärer

25 September 2019 Round 8	Basel	4–0	Zürich	St. Jakob-Park, Basel
20:00	Cabral 9'; Bua (yellow card) 50', (goal) 51'; Zhegrova 80'; Campo 90'	FCB report	Kramer (yellow card) 53'; Aiyegun (yellow card) 82'	Attendance: 22,760; Referee: (Switzerland) Alain Bier

29 September 2019 Round 9	Basel	3–0	Luzern	St. Jakob-Park, Basel
16:00	Cabral 28', 57'; Bua (yellow card) 67'; Widmer (yellow card) 70'; Ademi 90+1'	Report		Attendance: 23,768; Referee: (Switzerland) Lionel Tschudi

6 October 2019 Round 10	St. Gallen	0–0	Basel	Kybunpark, St. Gallen
16.00	Guillemenot (yellow card) 33'; Demirović (yellow card) 41'; Letard (yellow card) 88'	Report	Xhaka (yellow card) 8'; Bergström (yellow card) 22'; Cabral (yellow card) 43'; Cömert (yellow card) 73'; Ademi (yellow card) 80'	Referee: (Switzerland) Stephan Klossner

19 October 2019 Round 11	Basel	3–1	Thun	St. Jakob-Park, Basel
19.00	Bua 50'; Rapp 73' (o.g.); Zuffi 78'	Report	Fatkič (yellow card) 53'; Rapp 67'; Castroman (yellow card) 71'	Attendance: 21,503; Referee: (Switzerland) Nikolaj Hänni

27 October 2019 Round 12	Zürich	3–2	Basel	Letzigrund, Zürich
16.00	Sohm (yellow card) 12'; Nathan (yellow card) 15'; Tosin 19'; Schönbächler 33'; Domgjoni (yellow card) 36'; Kramer 61'; Kololli (yellow card) 87'	FCB report	15' (pen.) Campo; 48' Cömert; (yellow card) 50' Pululu; (yellow card) 67' Stocker; (yellow card) 74' Petretta; (yellow card) 94' Ademi	Attendance: 11,101; Referee: (Switzerland) Urs Schnyder

3 November 2019 Round 13	Basel	1–1	Xamax	St. Jakob-Park, Basel
16:00	Alderete (yellow card) 42'; Ademi 74'	FCB report	29' (yellow card) 24' Nuzzolo; (yellow card) 36' Xhemajli; (yellow card) 51' Doudin; (yellow card) 86' Gomes; (yellow card) 88' Seydoux; (yellow card) 91' Mveng; (yellow card) 93' Minder	Attendance: 18,003; Referee: (Switzerland) Alessandro Dudic

10 November 2019 Round 14	Lugano	0–3	Basel	Cornaredo, Lugano
16:00	Custodio (yellow card) 54'; Marić (yellow card) 82'	FCB report	Ademi 13'; Cömert (yellow card) 21'; Frei (yellow card) 25', (goal) 32'; Cabral 90+3'	Attendance: 3,620; Referee: (Switzerland) Lionel Tschudi

23 November 2019 Round 15	Servette	2–0	Basel	Stade de Genève, Geneva
19:00	Stevanović 7'; Ondoua (yellow card) 22'; Gonçalves (yellow card) 26'; Wüthrich (yellow card) 38'; Koné 90'	FCB report	Ademi (yellow card) 74'; Frei (yellow card) 76'; Widmer (yellow card) 79'; Stocker (red card) 90+3'	Attendance: 10,400; Referee: (France) Karim Abed

1 December 2019 Round 16	Basel	3–0	Young Boys	St. Jakob-Park, Basel
16:00	Cabral 6'; Alderete 13'; Zhegrova (yellow card) 45+3', (goal) 48'; Frei (yellow card) 83'	FCB report	Garcia (yellow card) 54'; Janko (yellow card) 73'	Attendance: 30,965; Referee: (Switzerland) Stephan Klossner

8 December 2019 Round 17	Basel	4–0	Sion	St. Jakob-Park, Basel
16:00	Cömert 23'; Cabral (yellow card) 38', (goal) 45+1', 57'; Pululu 69'; Zhegrova (yellow card) 73'	FCB report	Cotter (yellow card) 64'; Maceiras (yellow card) 73'	Attendance: 22,274; Referee: (Switzerland) Fedayi San

15 December 2019 Round 18	Luzern	2–1	Basel	Swissporarena, Luzern
16:00	Schürpf 10', 64' (pen.); Males (yellow card) 32'; Müller (yellow card) 60'; Matos (yellow card) 79'	FCB report	Xhaka (yellow card) 21'; Zuffi 61' (pen.); Cabral (yellow card) 63'; Cömert (yellow card) 63' (yellow-red card) 90+9'	Attendance: 10,073; Referee: (Switzerland) Adrien Jaccottet

==== Second half of season ====
26 January 2020 Round 19	Young Boys	2–0	Basel	Stade de Suisse, Bern
16:00	Aebischer (yellow card) 37'; Nsame 39'; Hoarau 78'	FCB report	Ademi (yellow card) 13'; Petretta (yellow card) 58'; Bergström (yellow card) 77'; Alderete (yellow card) 87' (yellow-red card) 90'	Attendance: 31,120; Referee: (Switzerland) Sandro Schärer (Buttikon)

2 February 2020 Round 20	Basel	1–2	St. Gallen	St. Jakob-Park, Basel
16:00	Bua 19'; Zuffi (yellow card) 55'; F. Frei (yellow card) 67'; Xhaka (yellow card) 78'; Petretta (yellow card) 90'	FCB report	Fazliji 44'; Itten (yellow card) 49'; Guillemenot (yellow card) 61'; Muheim (yellow card) 79'; Hefti (yellow card) 87'; Ribeiro 90+3'	Attendance: 20,527; Referee: (Switzerland) Fedayi San (Gebenstorf)

8 February 2020 Round 21	Zürich	0–4	Basel	Letzigrund, Zürich
19:00	Nathan (yellow card) 27'; Bangura (yellow card) 45'; Sohm (yellow card) 76'; Schönbächler (yellow card) 84'	FCB report	F. Frei 1', 80', 84'; Stocker 45+1', (yellow card) 82'; Zhegrova (yellow card) 84'	Attendance: 10,870; Referee: (Greece) Athanasios Tzilos

15 February 2020 Round 22	Basel	0–1	Thun	St. Jakob-Park, Basel
19:00	Pululu (yellow card) 90'	FCB report	Stillhart (yellow card) 37'; Munsy 79'; Bertone (yellow card) 82'	Attendance: 20,675; Referee: (Switzerland) Alain Bieri

23 February 2020 Round 23	Basel	2–2	Servette	St. Jakob-Park, Basel
16:00	Petretta (yellow card) 2'; Stocker 7', (yellow card) 54'; F. Frei 19'; Alderete (yellow card) 68'; Cömert (yellow card) 74'	FCB report	Sauthier (yellow card) 28'; Iapichino (yellow card) 39'; Imeri (yellow card) 59', (goal) 75' (pen.); Ondoua (yellow card) 78'; Stevanović 87'; Azevedo (yellow card) 88'	Attendance: 20,265; Referee: (Switzerland) Adrien Jaccottet

21 June 2020 (Note: All matches in Switzerland between 28 February and end of May were postponed due to outbreak of COVID-19 in Switzerland.) Round 24	Luzern	2–1	Basel	Swissporarena, Luzern
16:00	Emini (yellow card) 4'; Margiotta 23' (1:0); Voca (yellow card) 31'; Eleke 81' (2:0)	FCB Report	(yellow card) 70' Pululu; 86' (2:1) Cabral	Attendance: 0 Referee: (Switzerland) Fedayi San
Note: The match was originally due to be played on 1 March, but the season was suspended due to outbreak of COVID-19 in Switzerland and later rescheduled.

24 June 2020 Round 25	Xamax	1–2	Basel	Stade de la Maladière, Neuchâtel
18:15	Araz 11', (yellow card) 80'; Djourou (yellow card) 70'; Kouassi (yellow card) 79'	FCB Report	Stocker 19'; Alderete (yellow card) 37'; Cabral 76'	Attendance: 1,000; Referee: (Switzerland) Stefan Horisberger
Note: The match was originally due to be played on 8 March, but the season was suspended due to outbreak of COVID-19 in Switzerland and later rescheduled.

28 June 2020 Round 26	Basel	2–0	Sion	St. Jakob-Park, Basel
16:00	Ademi 86'; Campo 89'	FCB Report	Batata (yellow card) 51'; Grgić (yellow card) 55'; Abdellaoui (yellow card) 88'	Attendance: 1,000; Referee: (Switzerland) Sandro Schärer
Note: The match was originally due to be played on 15 March, but the season was suspended due to outbreak of COVID-19 in Switzerland and later rescheduled.

1 July 2020 Round 27	Lugano	2–1	Basel	Cornaredo, Lugano
18:15	Lovrić (yellow card) 45'; Gerndt 73'; Holender 79'; Sabbatini (yellow card) 85'; Marić (yellow card) 89'; Yao (yellow card) 90+4'	FCB report	(yellow card) 26' Alderete; (yellow card) 67' Petretta; (yellow card) 82' Stocker; (yellow card) 85' Cabral; (red card) 89' Alderete; 90' Cabral	Attendance: 1,000; Referee: (Switzerland) Lukas Fähndrich
Note: The match was originally due to be played on 22 March, but the season was suspended due to outbreak of COVID-19 in Switzerland and later rescheduled.

4 July 2020 Round 28	Basel	2–0	Xamax	St. Jakob-Park, Basel
18:15	Petretta 17'; Ramires (yellow card) 67'; Cabral 82'	FCB report	Araz (yellow card) 11'; Corbaz (yellow card) 38'; André (yellow card) 56'; Kouassi (yellow card) 85'; Seydoux (yellow card) 87'	Attendance: 1,000; Referee: (Switzerland) Luca Piccolo
Note: The match was originally due to be played on 4 April, but the season was suspended due to outbreak of COVID-19 in Switzerland and later rescheduled.

8 July 2020 Round 29	Sion	1–0	Basel	Stade Tourbillon, Sion
20:30	Kasami 29'; Uldriķis (yellow card) 36'; Ndoye (yellow card) 43' (yellow-red card) 55'; Stojilković (yellow card) 56'; Maceiras (yellow card) 87'; Toma (yellow card) 88'	FCB report	Ramires (yellow card) 34'	Attendance: 1,000; Referee: (Switzerland) Urs Schnyder
Note: The match was originally due to be played on 11 April, but the season was suspended due to outbreak of COVID-19 in Switzerland and later rescheduled.

11 July 2020 Round 30	Basel	3–2	Young Boys	St. Jakob-Park, Basel
20:30	Campo 13'; Pululu (yellow card) 23'; Arthur 48', 61'; Cömert (yellow card) 55'; Widmer (yellow card) 76'; Omlin (yellow card) 90+4'	FCB report	Janko (yellow card) 32'; Aebischer (yellow card) 50' (yellow-red card) 81'; Lotomba (yellow card) 51'; Nsame 66'; Fassnacht 70'	Attendance: 1,000; Referee: (Switzerland) Sandro Schärer
Note: The match was originally due to be played on 18 April, but the season was suspended due to outbreak of COVID-19 in Switzerland and later rescheduled.

14 July 2020 Round 31	Basel	4–0	Zürich	St. Jakob-Park, Basel
20:30	F. Frei 14', 90+3', (yellow card) 88'; Xhaka (yellow card) 34'; Stocker 37'; Van Wolfswinkel 90+1'	FCB report	Schönbächler (yellow card) 34'	Attendance: 1,000; Referee: (Switzerland) Fedayi San
Note: The match was originally due to be played on 24 April, but the season was suspended due to outbreak of COVID-19 in Switzerland and later rescheduled.

19 July 2020 Round 32	Servette	2–2	Basel	Stade de Genève, Geneva
16:00	Kyei 9'; Sauthier (yellow card) 43'; Imeri (yellow card) 45+3'; Schalk 58', (yellow card) 73'; Cognat (yellow card) 61'	FCB report	Campo 19' (pen.); Alderete (yellow card) 37', (goal) 62'; Cabral (yellow card) 61' (yellow-red card) 83'	Attendance: 1,000; Referee: (Switzerland) Luca Piccolo
Note: The match was originally due to be played in April, but the season was suspended due to outbreak of COVID-19 in Switzerland and later rescheduled.

22 July 2020 Round 33	St. Gallen	0–5	Basel	Kybunpark, St. Gallen
20:30	Görtler (yellow card) 7'; Demirović (yellow card) 62'; Itten (yellow card) 65'	FCB report	Ademi 4', 57', (yellow card) 69'; Campo 5'; Widmer (yellow card) 34'; Stocker 84'; Van Wolfswinkel 87'	Attendance: 1,000; Referee: (Switzerland) Urs Schnyder
Note: The match was originally due to be played in May, but the season was suspended due to outbreak of COVID-19 in Switzerland and later rescheduled.

26 July 2020 Round 34	Basel	4–4	Lugano	St. Jakob-Park, Basel
16:00	Ademi 8', 68'; F. Frei 11', (yellow card) 70'; Cömert (yellow card) 38'; Alderete (yellow card) 52'; Campo (yellow card) 76'; Xhaka (yellow card) 90+1'; Cabral 90+3'	FCB report	Lovrić 6'; Guidotti (yellow card) 18'; Jefferson 41'; Kecskés 45+1'; Lungoyi (yellow card) 56', (goal) 80'; Sabbatini (yellow card) 80'; Baumann (yellow card) 89'	Attendance: 1,000; Referee: (Switzerland) Lionel Tschudi
Note: The match was originally due to be played in May, but the season was suspended due to outbreak of COVID-19 in Switzerland and later rescheduled.

31 July 2020 Round 35	Thun	0–0	Basel	Stockhorn Arena, Thun
20:30		FCB report	Arthur (yellow card) 43'; Alderete (yellow card) 67' (yellow-red card) 71'; Oberlin (yellow card) 81'; Campo (yellow card) 90'; Van der Werff (yellow card) 90+2'	Attendance: 1,000; Referee: (Switzerland) Alain Bieri
Note: The match was originally due to be played in May, but the season was suspended due to outbreak of COVID-19 in Switzerland and later rescheduled.

3 August 2020 Round 36	Basel	0–0	Luzern	St. Jakob-Park, Basel
20:30		FCB report		Attendance: 1,000; Referee: (Switzerland) Urs Schnyder
Note: The match was originally due to be played in May, but the season was suspended due to outbreak of COVID-19 in Switzerland and later rescheduled.

==== Final league table ====
Pos	Team	Pld	W	D	L	GF	GA	GD	Pts	Qualification or relegation
1	Young Boys (C)	36	23	7	6	80	41	+39	76	Qualificaition for Champions League second qualifying round
2	St. Gallen	36	21	5	10	79	56	+23	68	Qualificaition for Europa League third qualifying round
3	Basel	36	18	8	10	74	38	+36	62	Qualificaition for Europa League second qualifying round
4	Servette	36	12	13	11	57	48	+9	49	Qualificaition for Europa League first qualifying round
5	Lugano	36	11	14	11	46	46	0	47	
6	Luzern	36	13	7	16	42	50	−8	46	
7	Zürich	36	12	7	17	45	72	−27	43	
8	Sion	36	10	9	17	40	55	−15	39	
9	Thun (R)	36	10	8	18	45	67	−22	38	Qualificaition for relegation play-offs
10	Neuchâtel Xamax (R)	36	5	12	19	33	68	−35	27	Relegation to Swiss Challenge League

Source: Swiss Super League
Rules for classification: 1) Points; 2) Goal difference; 3) Goals scored; 4) Head-to-head goal difference; 5) Away goals scored; 6) Draw.
(C) Champions; (R) Relegated

=== Swiss Cup ===
The draw for the first round was held in June 2018. The Super League and Challenge League clubs were seeded and could not be drawn against each other. The lower division teams were granted home advantage and Basel were therefore drawn away. The home advantage was also granted to the team from the lower league in the second and third rounds.

17 August 2019 Round 1	Pully Football	1–4	Basel	Centre sportif de Rochettaz, Pully
17.00	Favre 45+1'	FCB report SFV report	Bua 17', 49', 81'; Campo 87'	Attendance: 2,000

15 September 2019 Round 2	Meyrin FC	0–3	Basel	Stade des Arbères, Meyrin
19.00		FCB report SFV report	Ademi 62'; F. Frei 68'; Stocker 84'	Attendance: 1,000; Referee: (Switzerland) Luca Piccolo

30 October 2019 Round 3	Stade Lausanne	1–2	Basel	Center Sportiv de Colovra, Lausanne
20.00	Eleouet 63'	FCB report SFV report	F. Frei 75'; Okafor 90+2'	Attendance: 750; Referee: (Switzerland) Stephan Klossner

3 March 2020 Quarter-finals	Lausanne-Sport	P – P	Basel	Olympique de la Pontaise, Lausanne
20.00
Note: The match was originally due to be played in May, but the season was suspended due to outbreak of COVID-19 in Switzerland and later rescheduled.

14 June 2020 Quarter-finals	Lausanne-Sport	2–3 (a.e.t.)	Basel	Olympique de la Pontaise, Lausanne
16:00	Zeqiri 72'; Geissmann 73'	FCB report	Cabral 50', 67'; Widmer 105'	Attendance: 0 Referee: (Switzerland) Alain Bieri (Solothurn)

25 August 2020 Semi-finals	Basel	6–1	FC Winterthur	St. Jakob-Park, Basel
20:15	Stocker 2'; Widmer 4'; Van Wolfswinkel 22', 61'; Pululu (yellow card) 39', (goal) 50'; F. Frei 63'	FCB report	Buess 31'	Attendance: 0 Referee: (Switzerland) Lionel Tschudi

30 August 2020 Final	Basel	1–2	Young Boys	Stadion Wankdorf, Bern
17:30	Widmer (yellow card) 12'; Alderete 42'; Marchand (yellow card) 62'; Ademi (yellow card) 68'; Van der Werff (yellow card) 74'	FCB report	Martins (yellow card) 5'; Nsame 50'; Garcia (yellow card) 69'; Ngamaleu (yellow card) 74'; Spielmann 89'	Attendance: 1,000; Referee: (Switzerland) Sandro Schärer

=== UEFA Champions League ===
==== Qualifying phase ====
Basel were qualified for the 2019–20 UEFA Champions League in the qualifying phase (League Path) in the second qualifying round. The draw for this round was held on 19 June 2019.

23 July 2019 First leg	PSV Eindhoven (Netherlands)	3–2	(Switzerland) Basel	Philips Stadion, Eindhoven
20:00	Bruma 14'; Bergwijn (yellow card) 73'; Sadílek (yellow card) 84'; Lammers 89'; Malen 90+2'	Report	Ajeti 45+1', (yellow card) 88'; Xhaka (yellow card) 63'; Widmer (yellow card) 73'; Alderete 79'	Attendance: 31,000; Referee: Andris Treimanis (Latvia)

30 July 2019 Second leg	Basel (Switzerland)	2–1 (4a – 4 agg.)	(Netherlands) PSV Eindhoven	St. Jakob-Park, Basel
20:00	Cömert 8'; Van Wolfswinkel (yellow card) 33', (goal) 68'; Xhaka (yellow card) 45'; Alderete (yellow card) 45+4'	Report	Bruma 23'; Sainsbury (yellow card) 44'; Bergwijn (yellow card) 67'; Sadílek (yellow card) 82'	Attendance: 29,216; Referee: Fabio Verissimo (Portugal)

After winning the second qualifying round, Basel qualified for the third qualifying round. The draw for this round was held on 22 July 2019.

7 August 2019 First leg	Basel (Switzerland)	1–2	(Austria) LASK	St. Jakob-Park, Basel
20:00	Riveros (yellow card) 28'; Zuffi 87'	Report	Michorl (yellow card) 26'; Trauner 51'; Klauss 82'	Attendance: 20,470; Referee: Andreas Ekberg (Sweden)

13 August 2019 Second leg	LASK (Austria)	3–1 (5–2 agg.)	(Switzerland) Basel	Linzer Stadion, Linz
20:30	Ranftl (yellow card) 51', (goal) 59'; Stocker (yellow card) 63'; Goiginger 89'; Raguž 90+4'	Report	Ademi 80'	Attendance: 14,000; Referee: Aliyar Aghayev (Azerbaijan)

=== UEFA Europa League ===
==== Group stage ====
Following their elimination in the UEFA Champions League qualifying phase, Basel were qualified for the Europa League group stage.

===== Group C matches =====
19 September 2019 Matchday 1	Basel (Switzerland)	5–0	(Russia) Krasnodar	St. Jakob-Park, Basel
18:55	Bua 9', 40'; Stocker (yellow card) 51'; Zuffi 52'; Vilhena 55' (o.g.); Okafor 59'	Report	Martynovich (yellow card) 64'	Attendance: 14,127; Referee: Mattias Gestranius (Finland)

3 October 2019 Matchday 2	Trabzonspor (Turkey)	2–2	(Switzerland) Basel	Şenol Güneş Stadium, Trabzon
21:00 (22:00 TRT)	Erdoğan (yellow card) 23'; Parmak 26', (yellow card) 45+1'; Sosa 78'	Report	Widmer 20'; Xhaka (yellow card) 35'; Okafor 80'; Petretta (yellow card) 83'; Stocker (yellow card) 90+4'	Attendance: 23,867; Referee: Marco Di Bello (Italy)

24 October 2019 Matchday 3	Getafe (Spain)	0–1	(Switzerland) Basel	Coliseum Alfonso Pérez, Getafe
21:00	Kenedy (yellow card) 45+3'; Portillo (yellow card) 55'; Ángel (yellow card) 90'	Report	Frei 18', (yellow card) 65'; Cömert (yellow card) 29'; Stocker (yellow card) 35'; Xhaka (yellow card) 39'; Zuffi (yellow card) 51'; Bua (yellow card) 54' (yellow-red card) 74'; Alderete (yellow card) 56'; Nikolić (yellow card) 60'	Attendance: 6,213; Referee: Jérôme Brisard (France)

7 November 2019 Matchday 4	Basel (Switzerland)	2–1	(Spain) Getafe	St. Jakob-Park, Basel
18:55	Cabral 8'; Xhaka (yellow card) 38'; Riveros (yellow card) 44'; Frei 60'	Report	Gallego (yellow card) 17'; Mata 45' (pen.)	Attendance: 26,298; Referee: Serhiy Boyko (Ukraine)

28 November 2019 Matchday 5	Krasnodar (Russia)	1–0	(Switzerland) Basel	Krasnodar Stadium, Krasnodar
16:50 (18:50 MSK)	Wanderson (yellow card) 52'; Gazinsky (yellow card) 63'; Ari 72' (pen.), (yellow card) 73' (yellow-red card) 90+5'; Ramírez (yellow card) 75'; Martynovich (yellow card) 90+3'	Report	Frei (yellow card) 90+3'; Alderete (yellow card) 90+6'	Referee: Bobby Madden (Scotland)

12 December 2019 Matchday 6	Basel (Switzerland)	2–0	(Turkey) Trabzonspor	St. Jakob-Park, Basel
18:55	Widmer 22'; Stocker 72'	Report	Parmak (yellow card) 17'; Asan (yellow card) 55'	Referee: Aleksandar Stavrev (North Macedonia)

===== Group C table =====
Pos	Team	Pld	W	D	L	GF	GA	GD	Pts	Qualification	BSL	GET	KRA	TRA
1	(Switzerland) Basel	6	4	1	1	12	4	+8	13	Advance to knockout phase	—	2–1	5–0	2–0
2	(Spain) Getafe	6	4	0	2	8	4	+4	12	Advance to knockout phase	0–1	—	3–0	1–0
3	(Russia) Krasnodar	6	3	0	3	7	11	−4	9		1–0	1–2	—	3–1
4	(Turkey) Trabzonspor	6	0	1	5	3	11	−8	1		2–2	0–1	0–2	—

Source: UEFA
Rules for classification: Group stage tiebreakers

==== Knockout phase ====
===== Round of 32 =====
20 February 2020 First leg	APOEL (Cyprus)	0–3	(Switzerland) Basel	GSP Stadium, Nicosia
21:00	Pavlović (yellow card) 28'; Matić (yellow card) 73'; Jensen (yellow card) 83'	Report	Petretta 16'; Stocker 53', (yellow card) 73'; Alderete (yellow card) 62'; Arthur 66'	Attendance: 8,191; Referee: Orel Grinfeld (Israel)

27 February 2020 Second leg	Basel (Switzerland)	1–0 (4–0 agg.)	(Cyprus) APOEL	St. Jakob-Park, Basel
21:00	F. Frei 38' (pen.); Isufi (yellow card) 81'	Report	Matić (yellow card) 23'; Jensen (yellow card) 55'; Efrem (yellow card) 63'; Vouros (yellow card) 76'; De Vincenti (yellow card) 86'	Attendance: 14,428; Referee: Pavel Královec (Czech Republic)

===== Round of 16 =====
12 March 2020 First leg	Eintracht Frankfurt (Germany)	0–3	(Switzerland) Basel	Waldstadion, Frankfurt
18:55	Sow (yellow card) 23'	Report	Campo (yellow card) 11', (goal) 27'; Cömert (yellow card) 53'; Bua 73'; Alderete (yellow card) 76'; F. Frei 85'	Attendance: 0 Referee: Andreas Ekberg (Sweden)

19 March 2020 (Note: The match between Basel and Eintracht Frankfurt, originally scheduled to be played on 19 March 2020, 21:00 CET in Basel, was indefinitely postponed due to an outbreak of COVID-19 in Switzerland.) Second leg	Basel (Switzerland)	Postponed	(Germany) Eintracht Frankfurt	St. Jakob-Park, Basel
18:55

6 August 2020 Second leg	Basel (Switzerland)	1–0 (4–0 agg.)	(Germany) Eintracht Frankfurt	St. Jakob-Park, Basel
21:00	Cömert (yellow card) 25'; F. Frei 88'	Report	Kohr (yellow card) 33'; Chandler (yellow card) 80'	Attendance: 0 Referee: Antonio Mateu Lahoz (Spain)

===== Quarter-finals =====
11 August 2020 Quarter-finals	Shakhtar Donetsk (Ukraine)	4–1	(Switzerland) Basel	Arena AufSchalke, Gelsenkirchen
21:00	Moraes 2'; Taison 22'; Patrick (yellow card) 53', (goal) 75' (pen.); Bondar (yellow card) 87'; Dodô 88'	Report	F. Frei (yellow card) 26'; Arthur (yellow card) 64'; Van Wolfswinkel 90+2'	Attendance: 0 Referee: Michael Oliver (England)

== See also ==
- History of FC Basel
- List of FC Basel players
- List of FC Basel seasons

== Sources ==
- Die ersten 125 Jahre / 2018. Publisher: Josef Zindel im Friedrich Reinhardt Verlag, Basel. ISBN 978-3-7245-2305-5
- Season 2018–19 at "Basler Fussballarchiv” homepage
- Switzerland 2019–20 at RSSSF
