= Eray Cömert =

Swiss footballer (born 1998)

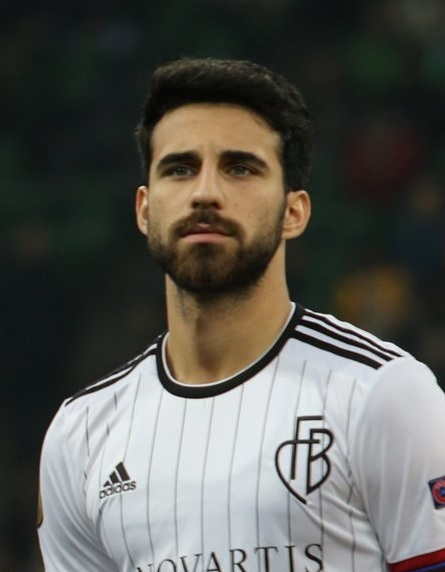
- Cömert with Basel in 2019

Personal information
- Full name: Eray Ervin Cömert
- Date of birth: 4 February 1998 (age 28)
- Place of birth: Rheinfelden, Switzerland
- Height: 1.83 m (6 ft 0 in)
- Position: Centre-back

Team information
- Current team: Torino
- Number: 5

Youth career
- 2006–2009: Concordia Basel
- 2009–2016: Basel

Senior career*
Years	Team	Apps	(Gls)
2016–2022	Basel	101	(5)
2017	→ Lugano (loan)	12	(0)
2017–2018	→ Sion (loan)	12	(0)
2022–2026	Valencia	48	(3)
2023–2024	→ Nantes (loan)	25	(2)
2024–2025	→ Valladolid (loan)	25	(0)
2026–	Torino	4	(0)

International career^{‡}
2013–2014	Switzerland U16	6	(1)
2014–2015	Switzerland U17	7	(0)
2015–2016	Switzerland U18	5	(0)
2016–2017	Switzerland U19	7	(0)
2018–2021	Switzerland U21	9	(3)
2019–	Switzerland	24	(0)
- * Club domestic league appearances and goals as of 19 September 2026 ‡ National team caps and goals as of 16 November 2026

Eray Ervin Cömert (born 4 February 1998) is a Swiss professional footballer who plays as a centre-back for Serie A club Torino and the Switzerland national team.

== Club career ==
=== Basel ===
==== Youth football ====
Cömert started his youth football with Concordia Basel. In 2009, he transferred to the youth system of Basel advancing regularly through the ranks. In summer 2014, he advanced to their U-18 team under coach Raphael Wicky, playing more than half of the games that season and winning the Swiss U-18 Cup.

In the following season, he started with the U-18 team and during the winter break advanced to their U-21 team, who played in the Promotion League the third highest tier in the Swiss football league system. Just a few months later, Basel's first team secured the Swiss championship with the 2–1 victory over Sion. Basel's head coach Urs Fischer had nominated Cömert as substitute for that match and nominated him into the starting eleven for each of the last five games of the season. He played his domestic league debut for the club in the away game in the Letzigrund on 7 May 2016 as Basel won 3–2 against Zürich.

For their 2016–17 season, Cömert trained with the first team but played for the U-21 team to gain playing experience. He played in nine test games for the first team and had two 90-minute appearances for them in that season's Swiss Cup. At the end of Basel's 2016–17 season, the team won the championship. They also won the 2016–17 Swiss Cup, defeating Sion 3–0 in the final, which meant they had won the double.

==== Loans to Lugano and Sion ====
On 8 March 2017, Basel announced that they were loaning out Cömert to Lugano, until the end of the 2016–17 Swiss Super League season, so that he could gain first team playing experience. He played the last 12 Matches of the season, each over the full 90 minutes and helped the team to avoid relegation. After the loan period he returned to his club of origin, but on 7 July Basel announced that they were loaning Cömert out to Sion, for the 2017–18 Super League season. However, in his very first game he injured his shoulder and missed the rest of the matches in that year. He returned in the new year, but after just ten games the injury reoccurred and he missed the rest of the season.

==== Breakthrough ====
After the loan period, in July 2018, Cömert again returned to Basel. But Basel's 2018–19 season started badly. Already in pre-season friendlies things went wrong and as the team started their league season they lost the first home game against St. Gallen. Head coach Raphaël Wicky was immediately replaced by Marcel Koller. But things were not much better, Basel ended the league season second, 20 points behind champions Young Boys. Nevertheless, Basel won the Swiss Cup in the 2018–19 season. The final was held on 19 May 2019 in the Stade de Suisse Wankdorf Bern against Thun. Striker Albian Ajeti scored the first goal, Fabian Frei the second for Basel, then Dejan Sorgić netted a goal for Thun, but the result was 2–1 for Basel. Cömert scored his first goal for his team in the home game in the St. Jakob-Park on 23 August. It was the 1st leg of the 2018–19 UEFA Europa League play-off round and it was the winning goal of the match as Basel won 3–2 against Apollon Limassol. He scored his first domestic league goal for his team in the away game in the Swissporarena on 25 November 2018. It was the equaliser in the fifth minute of added time as Basel played a 1–1 draw with Luzern. This season was the breakthrough for the central defender. Cömert totaled 31 appearances, 24 League, two in the Cup and five in the UEFA competitions (Champions League and Europa League. He scored those afore mentioned two goals in these matches.

==== Regular starter ====
Marcel Koller remained FCB first team manager for the 2019–20 season. The season started out well, despite the fact that Basel lost their first home game at the St. Jakob-Park, after 11 rounds they were leading the table having won eight. There after, however, they were defeated in three consecutive away games and thus slipped to second position in the table before the winter break. At the start of the second half of season the team suffered two straight defeats against reigning Swiss champions Young Boys and the team St. Gallen who then rose to the top of the league table. Following a home defeat against bottom of the table Thun, Basel lost contact to the top two teams and never caught up with them again. All matches in Switzerland between 28 February and the end of May were postponed due to the outbreak of COVID-19 in Switzerland. Basel ended the season in third position. In the 2019–20 Swiss Cup, Basel advanced to the final, but here they were defeated 2–1 by Young Boys. In the 2019–20 UEFA Champions League, Basel started in the qualifying phase. In the return game of the second qualifying round at home against PSV Eindhoven, Cömert scored his first Champions League goal. It was the first goal of the match as Basel went on to win 2–1 and they qualified for the next round. Here, however, they were knocked out and continued in the 2019–20 UEFA Europa League. Basel won their group and advanced against APOEL and Eintracht Frankfurt to the quarter-finals. But were knocked out here by Shakhtar Donetsk. Cömert totaled _ appearances, 33 league games, scoring two goals, three in the cup, but without scoring, and 14 in the UEFA competitions (Champions League and Europa League) scoring the aforementioned goal against PSV.

On 26 August, the club announced that Ciriaco Sforza had been hired as the first team manager as of 1 September 2020 for the 2020–21 season. The season started somewhat despairing, four defeats, one draw and three victories in eight games. But they caught themselves; six wins in eleven games to put the team in second position in the table by the winter break. After the new year things went wrong again, five defeats and only one victory in the first nine games, so on 6 April 2021, Ciriaco Sforza was sacked "due to the recent poor results". Patrick Rahmen, the former assistant manager, took over as interim manager. Basel ended the league as runners-up. In the 2020–21 Swiss Cup the team started in the third round and they messed things up completely, a 6–2 defeat against lower-tier Winterthur. In the shortened 2020–21 UEFA Europa League, Basel advanced from the second qualifying round but were eliminated by CSKA Sofia in the play-off round. Basel lost 3–1 after full-time and failed to qualify for the group stage. Cömert had a total of 33 appearances, 30 in the league, scoring one goal, and three in the 2020–21 UEFA Europa League without scoring.

Patrick Rahmen remained Basel's head coach for their 2021–22 season. The team started well into the league season. Cömert scored on the second match day, it was the team's third goal, as they went on to win 6–1 against Sion. However, in the return game against Sion, Cömert was sent off. In the 88th minute, shortly before Basel's winning goal, he could only catch the escaped Adryan with an emergency stop foul, for which he was shown the red card. This turned out to be a turning point in the player's career. Following his red card in mid-October, the Swiss national team defender had to wait for a further appearance in the Super League and this right up until the winter break. Instead of Cömert, FCB coach Patrick Rahmen relied on either veteran Fabian Frei or youngster Nasser Djiga in his central defence. Cömert mentioned in interviews that he would welcome a transfer abroad.

The club announced on 25 February 2022 that Cömert had transferred to Spanish club Valencia.

Between the years 2016 and 2017 and again from 2018 to 2022, Cömert played a total of 147 games for Basel, scoring seven goals. 101 of these games were in the Swiss Super League, 9 in the Swiss Cup, and 30 in the UEFA competitions (Champions League, Europa League and Conference League). He scored five goals in the domestic league and two in the European games.

=== Valencia ===
On 25 January 2022, Cömert moved abroad for the first time in his career, after signing a four-and-a-half-year contract with Spanish side Valencia, for a rumoured fee of €800,000. He featured eight times in La Liga during the 2021–22 season and made a further 23 league appearances, and scored one goal in the 2022–23 season.

==== Loan to Nantes ====
On 26 August 2023, Nantes announced that they and Valencia had reached an agreement on the loan of Cömert for the 2023–24 Ligue 1 season. The contract included an option to make the move permanent if needs were met.

==== Loan to Valladolid ====
On 10 July 2024, Cömert moved to fellow Spanish top-tier side Real Valladolid on loan from Valencia for one year.

=== Torino ===
On 30 July 2026, Cömert signed for Serie A club Torino as a free agent on a two-year contract.

== International career ==
Cömert was born in Rheinfelden, Switzerland and is of Turkish descent.

He represented Switzerland at under‑15, under‑16 and under‑17 level before progressing to the under‑18 team, for whom he made his debut as a centre‑back in a 2–1 win over Denmark under-18s on 22 September 2015. He played his first match for the under‑19s on 30 August 2016, captaining the side in a 1–0 victory against Slovakia.

Cömert represented Switzerland at youth level before receiving his first senior call‑up in 2019. He made his senior international debut on 18 November that year, coming on as a second‑half substitute for Manuel Akanji in a 6–1 win over Gibraltar during UEFA Euro 2020 qualifying. He was later included in Switzerland’s squad for UEFA Euro 2020, where the team reached the quarter‑finals, although he remained an unused substitute throughout the tournament.

On 20 May 2026, Cömert was selected in the 26-man squad for the 2026 FIFA World Cup.

== Career statistics ==
=== Club ===
As of match played 17 May 2026

Appearances and goals by club, season and competition
Club	Season	League			National cup (Note: Includes Swiss Cup, Copa del Rey, Coupe de France)		Europe		Other		Total	
Club	Season	Division	Apps	Goals	Apps	Goals	Apps	Goals	Apps	Goals	Apps	Goals
Basel	2015–16	Swiss Super League	5	0	0	0	0	0	–		5	0
Basel	2016–17	Swiss Super League	0	0	2	0	0	0	–		2	0
Basel	2018–19	Swiss Super League	24	1	1	0	5 (Note: One appearance in UEFA Champions League, four appearances and one goal in UEFA Europa League)	1	–		30	2
Basel	2019–20	Swiss Super League	33	2	3	0	14 (Note: Four appearances and one goal in UEFA Champions League, ten appearances in UEFA Europa League)	1	–		50	3
Basel	2020–21	Swiss Super League	30	1	0	0	3 (Note: Appearances in UEFA Europa League)	0	–		33	1
Basel	2021–22	Swiss Super League	9	1	2	0	8 (Note: Appearances in UEFA Europa Conference League)	0	–		19	1
Basel	Total		101	5	8	0	30	2	–		139	7
Lugano (loan)	2016–17	Swiss Super League	12	0	0	0	–		–		12	0
Sion (loan)	2017–18	Swiss Super League	12	0	0	0	–		–		12	0
Valencia	2021–22	La Liga	8	0	1	0	–		–		9	0
Valencia	2022–23	La Liga	23	1	1	0	–		1 (Note: Appearance in Supercopa de España)	0	25	1
Valencia	2025–26	La Liga	17	2	4	0	–		–		21	2
Valencia	Total		48	3	6	0	–		1	0	55	3
Nantes (loan)	2023–24	Ligue 1	25	2	2	0	–		–		27	2
Valladolid (loan)	2024–25	La Liga	25	0	3	0	–		–		28	0
Career total			223	10	19	0	30	2	1	0	273	12

=== International ===
As of match played 16 November 2026

Appearances and goals by national team and year
National team	Year	Apps	Goals
Switzerland	2019	1	0
Switzerland	2020	2	0
Switzerland	2021	4	0
Switzerland	2022	5	0
Switzerland	2023	2	0
Switzerland	2024	3	0
Switzerland	2025	1	0
Switzerland	2026	6	0
Total		24	0

== Honours ==
FC Basel U18

- Swiss U-18 Cup: 2014–15

FC Basel

- Swiss Super League: 2015–16, 2016–17
- Swiss Cup: 2016–17, 2018–19

Individual

- Swiss Super League Team of the Year: 2019–20, 2020–21
