= Eric Ramires =

Brazilian footballer (born 2000)

Personal information
- Full name: Eric dos Santos Rodrigues
- Date of birth: 10 August 2000 (age 26)
- Place of birth: Salvador, Brazil
- Height: 1.72 m (5 ft 8 in)
- Position: Midfielder

Team information
- Current team: Red Bull Bragantino
- Number: 7

Youth career
- 2011–2018: Bahia

Senior career*
Years	Team	Apps	(Gls)
2018-2022	Bahia	38	(2)
2019–2020	→ Basel (loan)	9	(0)
2020–2021	→ Red Bull Bragantino (loan)	48	(4)
2022–	Red Bull Bragantino	139	(9)

International career^{‡}
2019–	Brazil U20	4	(0)
- * Club domestic league appearances and goals as of 7 April 2026 ‡ National team caps and goals as of 11:53, 8 February 2019 (UTC)

Eric dos Santos Rodrigues (born 10 August 2000), known as Eric Ramires or Ramires, is a Brazilian professional footballer who plays as a midfielder for Red Bull Bragantino.

== Club career ==
=== Bahia ===
Born in Salvador, Bahia, Ramires joined Bahia's youth setup in 2011. He played regularly for the under-15 and under-17 sides, going on to win the Copa Red Ball, Copa Dois de Julho and Copa Metropolitana.

On 6 September 2018, Eric Ramires made his first team – and Série A – debut, starting in a 2–0 victory over Sport; by doing so, he became the first player born in 2000 to play for the club. On 15 September, his contract was extended until 2022.

On 21 September 2018, Ramires made his Copa Sudamericana debut, starting and scoring the opener in a 2–1 home defeat of Botafogo.

=== Basel ===
On 2 September 2019, Ramires da Silva signed with Swiss club Basel. The club announced the loan for their 2019–20 season under manager Marcel Koller on their home page on that day. He played his domestic league debut for the club in the home game at the St. Jakob-Park on 25 September as Basel won 4–0 against Zürich. He was substituted in for the last seven minutes of the match.

The club announced that the contract with Ramires would not be prolonged on 5 September 2020. During his one season with the club Ramires played a total of 12 games for Basel without scoring a goal. Nine of these games were in the Swiss Super League, two in the UEFA Europa League and one was a friendly game.

== International career ==
On 13 December 2018, Ramires was included in Brazil under-20s for the 2019 South American U-20 Championship.

== Career statistics ==
As of 25 October 2021

Club	Season	League			State League		Cup		Continental		Other		Total	
Club	Season	Division	Apps	Goals	Apps	Goals	Apps	Goals	Apps	Goals	Apps	Goals	Apps	Goals
Bahia	2018	Série A	15	1	—		—		2 (Note: Appearance(s) in Copa Sudamericana)	1	—		17	2
Bahia	2019	Série A	14	0	6	1	7	0	1	0	5 (Note: Appearance(s) in Copa do Nordeste)	1	33	2
Bahia	2020	Série A	3	0	0	0	0	0	0	0	0	0	3	0
Bahia	Total		32	1	6	1	7	0	3	1	5	1	53	4
Basel (loan)	2019–20	Swiss Super League	9	0	—		0	0	2 (Note: Appearance(s) in UEFA Europa League)	0	—		11	0
Red Bull Bragantino (loan)	2020	Série A	13	1	—		—		—		—		13	1
Red Bull Bragantino (loan)	2021	Série A	25	2	4	1	2	0	11	1	—		42	4
Red Bull Bragantino (loan)	Total		38	3	4	1	2	0	11	1	—		55	5
Career total			79	4	10	2	9	0	16	2	5	1	119	9
