= Valentin Stocker =

Swiss footballer (born 1989)

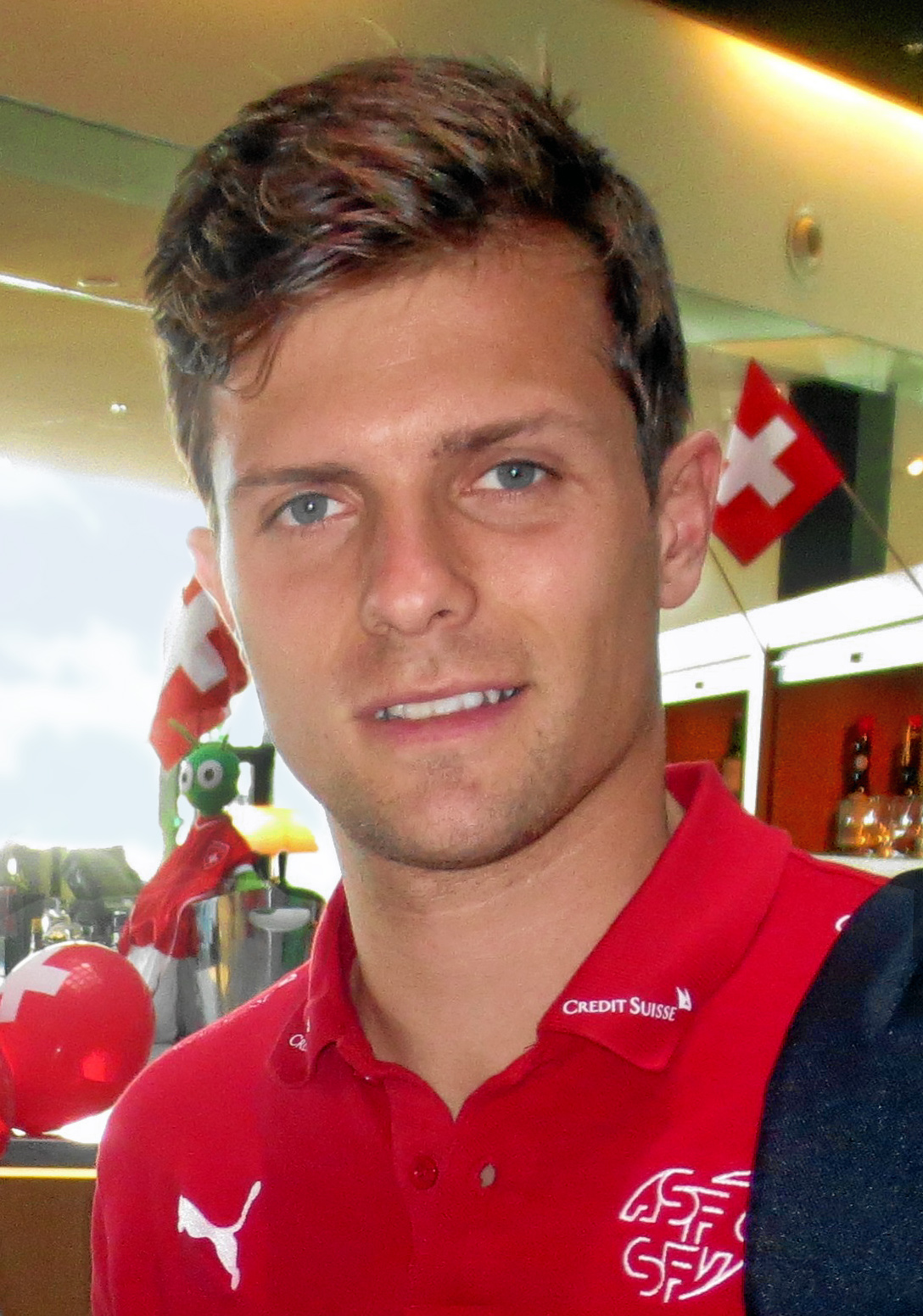
- Stocker with Switzerland in 2014

Personal information
- Full name: Valentin Stocker
- Date of birth: 12 April 1989 (age 37)
- Place of birth: Lucerne, Switzerland
- Height: 1.79 m (5 ft 10 in)
- Positions: Left midfielder; attacking midfielder

Youth career
- 1996–2005: SC Kriens
- 2006–2007: Basel

Senior career*
Years	Team	Apps	(Gls)
2006–2008	Basel U-21	37	(13)
2008–2014	Basel	176	(50)
2014–2018	Hertha BSC	65	(8)
2018–2022	Basel	110	(24)
Total		388	(95)

International career
2005	Switzerland U-16	5	(1)
2005–2006	Switzerland U-17	11	(6)
2006	Switzerland U-18	1	(0)
2006–2008	Switzerland U-19	13	(3)
2007–2009	Switzerland U-21	7	(2)
2008–2016	Switzerland	36	(6)
- * Club domestic league appearances and goals

Valentin Stocker (born 12 April 1989) is a Swiss former professional footballer who played as a left midfielder or attacking midfielder.

== Club career ==
=== Basel ===
Born in Lucerne, Stocker began his youth career with SC Kriens, playing there between 1996 and December 2005. In January 2006, he transferred to the youth department of Basel. He played in their U-18 team for the second half of the 2005–06 season, under coach Patrick Rahmen and his assistant Marco Walker and with them won both the Swiss U-18 championship and the U-19/18 national cup that season. He also played for their Under-21 team in the Swiss 1. Liga, which at that time the third highest tier of the Swiss football league system. A year later, in the 2006–07 season they won their division and the team became Swiss champions at U-21 level. The team defended their title in the 2007–08 season, as division (group2) winners, again becoming champions at U-21 level.

During Basel's 2007–08 season, head coach Christian Gross called Stocker into the first team. Stocker signed his first professional contract on his 18th birthday and just a few months later received an extension. Having played in 12 test matches he made his team debut in that season's Swiss Cup semi-final, a home game in the St. Jakob-Park on 27 February 2008, as Basel won 1–0 against Thun. One week later, in the away match against the same opponent, Stocker played his league debut, as Basel won 3–1 thanks to a hat-trick from Eren Derdiyok. Stocker scored his first league goal on 16 March against FC Sion, but this could not hinder the 4–2 away defeat. On 6 April Basel won the cup final and on 10 May, in the last league game of the season, Stocker scored the first and gave the assist to Marco Streller's second, as Basel won 2–0 over Young Boys. This secured the championship, and therefore, the national double. In the league Stocker had played eleven games and had scored three goals.

In the 2008–09 season Stocker became team regular. To the beginning of the season, he was member of the Basel team that won the Uhrencup. They beat Legia Warsaw 6–1 and played a 2–2 draw with Borussia Dortmund to end the table on top slot above Dortmund and Luzern. Basel joined the 2008–09 UEFA Champions League in the second qualifying round and with an aggregate score of 5–3 they eliminated IFK Göteborg. In the next round they played against Vitória de Guimarães. The first leg ended in a goalless draw, but with a 2–1 win in the second leg they eliminated Vitória, with Stocker scoring his first European goal. Basel advanced to the group stage and were matched with Barcelona, Sporting CP and Shakhtar Donetsk, but ended the group in last position, winning just one point after a 1–1 draw in Camp Nou. Stocker played in nine of these ten games. Basel finished just third in the league table, seven points behind new champions Zürich. Stocker played 32 of the 36 games, scoring five goals.

Basel joined the 2009–10 UEFA Europa League in the second qualifying round. Basel advanced to the group stage, in which despite winning three of the six games the ended in third position and were eliminated. They finished four points behind group winners Roma and one behind Fulham, against whom they lost 3–2 in the last game of the stage. Stocker played in nine of these twelve games. Stocker became a leading player within the team. In the Cup Final he scored a brace, the feams first and fifth goals as Basel won 6–0 against FC Lausanne-Sport. On 16 May 2010, the day of the last match of the league season, Basel and Young Boys were level on points. The two teams played each other in Stadion Wankdorf. Stocker scored the first and gave the assist to Scott Chipperfield's second, as Basel won 2–0. This secured the championship, and therefore, the national double. Stocker played 31 league games, scoring 12 goals.

In the 2010–11 season Stocker played 26 League games, marking seven goals, and he won his third championship medal with the club. But Stocker injured himself on 23 April 2011 in the game against BSC Young Boys. This was his 100th Super League match. The injury was a cruciate ligament rupture and was operated two days later. His recovery times was estimated at six to seven months.

In the 2011–12 season he returned into the team on 3 December 2011 during the 1–0 home victory against FC Luzern and on the same day it was announced that his contract had been extended until the end of June 2016. He was substituted in during the group stage of the 2011–12 UEFA Champions League 2–1 home win against Manchester United, as Basel qualified for the Knockout phase, sending United out of the competition. During the first leg match in the Round of 16 on 22 February 2012 against Bayern Munich he was substituted in and scored the winning goal. At the end of the 2011–12 Swiss Super League season Stocker won his fourth League Championship title with Basel, the third in a row. this was also his third Double because Basel also won the Swiss Cup

During the 2012–13 season Stocker had another highlight in his football career. Due to an injury Marco Streller and due an illness Alexander Frei were both unable to play the Europa League knockout phase match against Dnipro Dnipropetrovsk on 21 February 2013. Therefore, Stocker was nominated as team captain for the very first time and he led the Basel team to a 1–1 away draw and they qualified for the round of 16. At the end of the Swiss Super League season 2012–13 Stocker won his fifth Championship title (fourth in a row) and won the Swiss Cup runner-up silver medal. In the 2012–13 UEFA Europa League Basel advanced as far as the semi-finals, there being matched against the reigning UEFA Champions League holders Chelsea, but were knocked out being beaten 2–5 on aggregate.

Basel's 2013–14 Super League season was successful, as Stocker won his sixth league championship title with the club. They also reached the final of the 2013–14 Swiss Cup, but were beaten 2–0 by Zürich after extra time. During the 2013–14 Champions League season Basel reached the group stage and finished the group in third position. Thus they qualified for Europa League knockout phase and here they advanced as far as the quarter-finals. In their season 2013–14 Basel played a total of 68 matches (36 Swiss League fixtures, 6 Swiss Cup, 6 Champions League and 10 Europa League and 10 test matches). Stocker totaled 55 appearances, 30 League, 4 Cup, 10 Champions League and 5 Europa League as well 6 in the test games. He scored a total of 19 goals and gave 14 assists in these matches.

=== Hertha BSC ===
On 18 May 2014, Hertha BSC officially announced the signing of Stocker. Stocker reportedly received a four-year contract after Hertha and FC Basel agreed on a transfer fee of around €5 million.

=== Return to Basel ===
On 10 January 2018, FC Basel announced that Stocker would return to the club, signing a three-and-a-half-year contract dated up until June 2021.

Under trainer Marcel Koller Basel won the Swiss Cup in the 2018–19 season. In the first round Basel beat FC Montlingen 3–0, in the second round Echallens Région 7–2 and in the round of 16 Winterthur 1–0. In the quarter-finals Sion were defeated 4–2 after extra time and in the semi-finals Zürich were defeated 3–1. All these games were played away from home. The final was held on the 19 May 2019 in the Stade de Suisse Wankdorf Bern against Thun. Striker Albian Ajeti scored the first goal, Fabian Frei the second for Basel, then Dejan Sorgić netted a goal for Thun, but the end result was 2–1 for Basel. Stocker played in five cup games and scored the two goals, these both being during the extra time in the match against Sion.

On 17 May 2022, Basel announced that Stocker would retire from playing at the end of the 2021–22 season and will remain at the club as an assistant to the sporting director. Five days later, on 22 May, Stocker was substituted in to play the final 14 Minutes of his last professional game.

During his time with the club Stocker won the Swiss championship six times and the Swiss Cup four times. Between the years 2007 and 2014 and again from 2018 to 2022 he played a total of 515 games for Basel scoring a total of 116 goals. 286 of these games were in the Swiss Super League, 33 in the Swiss Cup, 57 in the UEFA competitions (Champions League, Europa League and Conference League and 99 were friendly games. He scored 74 goal in the domestic league, 9 in the Cup and 18 in the European competitions, the other 15 were scored during the test games. In terms of the number of competitive games, which is 416, he is one of the top five in the club's history, and in terms of goals scored - although not a striker - he is 12th position in the historic FCB rankings.

== International career ==
Stocker has played international football for Switzerland at various age levels, including U19 and U21. He made his debut for the Switzerland U16 team on 25 April 2005, being substituted in, in the 2–0 away defeat against Scotland U16. Between 2008 and 2009, he played 7 games for the Switzerland U21 team. His debut for the U21 was on 26 March 2008 in the UEFA European Under-21 Football Championship qualification Group 5 2–1 away defeat against Macedonia Under-21.

He made his debut for Switzerland in Ottmar Hitzfeld's first match as manager, on 20 August 2008 against Cyprus at Stade de Genève. He scored the opening goal of the 4–1 friendly win.

Stocker was included in Switzerland's squad for the 2014 FIFA World Cup, making one appearance, starting in the opening match against Ecuador before being substituted out at halftime.

== Career statistics ==
=== Club ===
Appearances and goals by club, season and competition
Club	Season	League			Cup		Continental		Total	
Club	Season	Division	Apps	Goals	Apps	Goals	Apps	Goals	Apps	Goals
Basel	2007–08	Swiss Super League	11	3	0	0	0	0	11	3
Basel	2008–09	Swiss Super League	32	5	0	0	9 (Note: Appearances in the UEFA Champions League.)	1	41	6
Basel	2009–10	Swiss Super League	31	12	1	2	9 (Note: Appearances in the UEFA Europa League.)	0	41	14
Basel	2010–11	Swiss Super League	26	7	0	0	10 (Note: Appearances in the UEFA Champions League and UEFA Europa League.)	3	36	10
Basel	2011–12	Swiss Super League	15	4	2	0	3	1	20	5
Basel	2012–13	Swiss Super League	31	6	2	1	17	3	50	10
Basel	2013–14	Swiss Super League	30	13	2	0	15	3	47	16
Basel	Total		176	50	7	3	63	11	246	64
Hertha BSC II	2014–15	Regionalliga Nordost	2	1	—		—		2	1
Hertha BSC	2014–15	Bundesliga	26	3	2	0	—		28	3
Hertha BSC	2015–16	Bundesliga	22	1	2	0	—		24	1
Hertha BSC	2016–17	Bundesliga	17	4	2	1	1	0	20	5
Hertha BSC	2017–18	Bundesliga	3	0	0	0	2	0	5	0
Hertha BSC	Total		68	8	6	1	3	0	77	9
Basel	2017–18	Swiss Super League	14	2	1	0	2	0	17	2
Basel	2018–19	Swiss Super League	17	2	5	2	4	0	26	4
Basel	2019–20	Swiss Super League	29	8	5	3	14	2	48	13
Basel	2020–21	Swiss Super League	8	3	0	0	3	1	11	4
Basel	Total		68	15	11	5	23	3	102	23
Career total			314	74	24	9	89	14	427	97

=== International goals ===
Scores and results list Switzerland's goal tally first, score column indicates score after each Stocker goal.

List of international goals scored by Valentin Stocker
No.	Date	Venue	Opponent	Score	Result	Competition	Ref.
1	20 August 2008	Stade de Genève, Geneva, Switzerland	Cyprus	1–0	4–1	Friendly	
2	12 October 2010	St. Jakob-Park, Basel, Switzerland	Wales	1–0	4–1	UEFA Euro 2012 qualifying	
3	12 October 2010	St. Jakob-Park, Basel, Switzerland	Wales	4–1	4–1	UEFA Euro 2012 qualifying	
4	31 March 2015	Letzigrund, Zürich, Switzerland	United States	1–1	1–1	Friendly	
5	5 September 2015	St. Jakob-Park, Basel, Switzerland	Slovenia	2–2	3–2	UEFA Euro 2016 qualifying	
6	7 October 2016	Groupama Arena, Budapest, Hungary	Hungary	3–2	3–2	2018 World Cup qualification	

== Honours ==
=== Club ===
Basel youth

- Swiss champion at U-18 level: 2005–06
- Swiss Cup at U-19/U-18 level: 2005–06
- Swiss champion at U-21 level: 2006–07, 2007–08

Basel

- Swiss Super League (6): 2007–08, 2009–10, 2010–11, 2011–12, 2012–13, 2013–14
- Swiss Cup (4): 2007–08, 2009–10, 2011–12, 2018–19
- Swiss Cup runner up (2): 2012–13, 2013–14
- Uhren Cup (2): 2008, 2013

Individual

- Swiss Youngster of the Year: 2008–09
- Swiss Super League Team of the Year: 2013

== Sources ==
- Josef Zindel (2018). FC Basel 1893. Die ersten 125 Jahre (in German). Basel: Friedrich Reinhardt Verlag. ISBN 978-3-7245-2305-5.

Sporting positions
Preceded by Marek Suchý	FC Basel captain 2019–2022	Succeeded by Fabian Frei
