= Éder Álvarez Balanta =

Colombian footballer (born 1993)

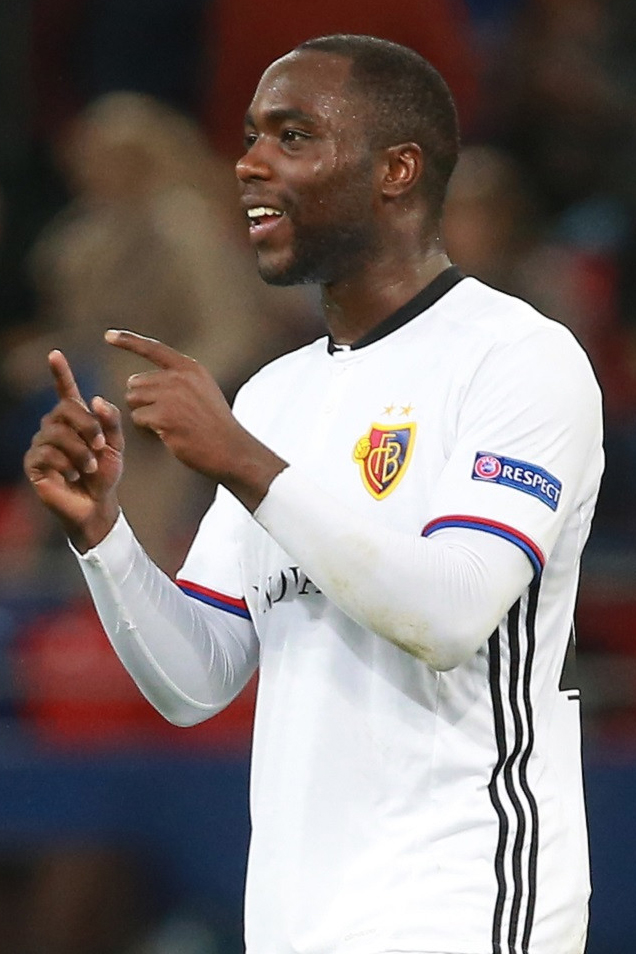
- Balanta playing for Basel in 2017

Personal information
- Full name: Éder Fabián Álvarez Balanta
- Date of birth: 28 February 1993 (age 33)
- Place of birth: Bogotá, Colombia
- Height: 1.80 m (5 ft 11 in)
- Positions: Defensive midfielder; centre-back

Youth career
- 2010: Academia
- 2011–2013: River Plate

Senior career*
Years	Team	Apps	(Gls)
2013–2016	River Plate	60	(2)
2016–2019	Basel	58	(3)
2019–2024	Club Brugge	100	(4)
2023	→ Schalke 04 (loan)	6	(0)
2024–2026	América de Cali	30	(1)

International career^{‡}
2014–2022	Colombia	9	(0)
- * Club domestic league appearances and goals as of 11 December 2025 ‡ National team caps and goals as of 24 July 2022

Éder Fabián Álvarez Balanta (Spanish pronunciation: [ˈeðeɾ ˈalβaɾes]; born 28 February 1993) is a Colombian professional footballer who plays as a defensive midfielder or centre-back and his most recent club was the Categoría Primera A club América de Cali and formerly the Colombia national team. River Plate former coach Ramón Díaz has compared Álvarez Balanta's talents to that of 1970s legend Daniel Passarella.

A Colombian international, he made his debut against Tunisia on 5 March 2014 and was later named in Colombia's squad for the 2014 FIFA World Cup.

Álvarez Balanta is described by FIFA's official website as "left-footed, powerfully built, strong in the air and a fearless tackler ... blessed with skill and speed."

== Club career ==
=== Early career ===
Álvarez Balanta was born in Bogotá, where he signed with the now dissolved club Academia in 2010 (who later became Llaneros). After a successful youth run winning various titles, he attracted the scouts of River Plate. Prior to his move to the Argentinian club, Balanta was never able to represent the Colombian national youth squads due to vast injuries.

=== River Plate ===
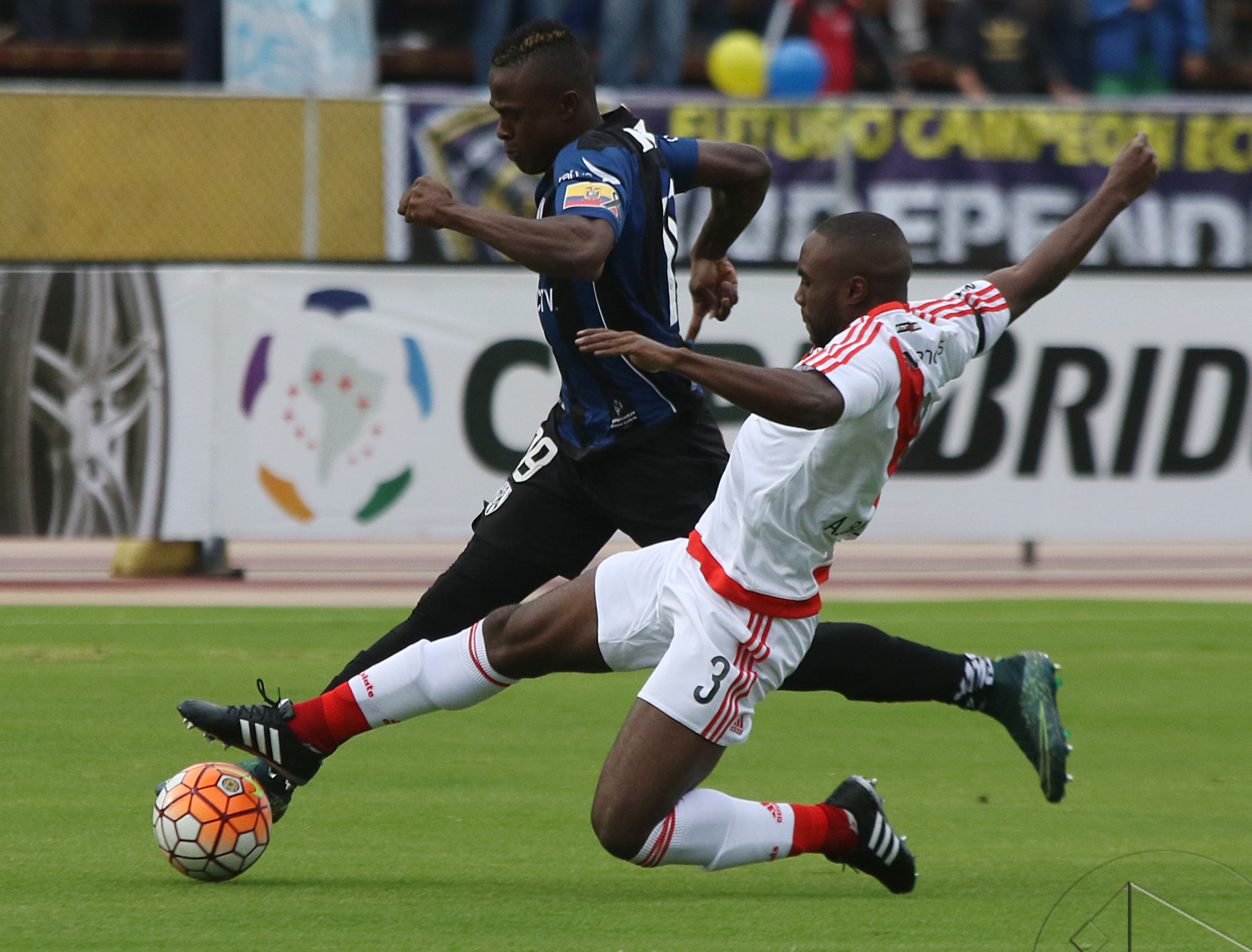
Balanta tackling for River Plate in 2016

In early 2011, Álvarez Balanta was tested in the youth division of the Argentinean Club and passed the trials and became a sub with the youth squad. In 2012, he was becoming more of a regular which led to an eventual championship victory in the 2012 U-20 Copa Libertadores. Due to his success with the youth team and impressive talent, he moved into the senior squad officially in 2013.

Álvarez Balanta made his debut with the senior squad against Racing Club. In just his third league match, he scored his first goal against Godoy Cruz. Álvarez Balanta scored yet another goal in his very next match, this time against Quilmes Atlético Club. He played his first Superclásico derby match against River Plate's fierce rivals, Boca Juniors. He played a huge part countering and cancelling the attacking plays in a fierce game that ended 1–1. Inter Milan reportedly made a bid for the young Colombian after just five league appearances. River Plate set a €12 million price tag. During a match against All Boys, Álvarez Balanta tore his internal obturador muscle resulting in a two-week absence on the pitch.

In July 2013, Álvarez Balanta officially signed his first senior contract with the club on a three-year term deal with a $30 million release clause.

Álvarez Balanta noticeably put on a man of the match performance in the 2013 Copa Sudamericana match against San Lorenzo. Throughout the match, he was praised for being "impassable".

In September 2013, it was reported that Barcelona had taken interest in Álvarez Balanta, and they plan to watch the player to evaluate his development. It was also mentioned that Álvarez Balanta could possibly be a successor to Barça's aging defender Carles Puyol, but that River Plate would require €50 million in any transfer deal. Weeks later, however, River Plate brought down his release clause to €15 million.

In River Plate's match against Lanús, Álvarez Balanta received his first ever red card within the last two minutes of regulation time.

On 19 February 2015, Álvarez Balanta made his debut in the 2015 Copa Libertadores against Bolivian club San José in which River Plate lost 2–0. On 12 March 2015, Balanta scored his first goal in the Copa Libertadores in 1–1 draw against Juan Aurich of Peru.

=== Basel ===
On 15 July 2016, Swiss club Basel announced that they had signed Éder Balanta on a four-year contract lasting until 30 June 2020. He joined Basel's first team for their 2016–17 season under head coach Urs Fischer. After playing in two test games he made his domestic league debut on 24 July in the 3–0 home win at the St. Jakob-Park against Sion. Balanta made his Champions League group stage debut in a 1–1 draw against PFC Ludogorets Razgrad on 12 September 2016. He scored his first league goal for his new club in the away game in the Olympique de la Pontaise on 21 September 2016. It was the winning goal of the match, in the 93rd minute, as Basel won 2–1 against Lausanne-Sport. He scored his first Swiss Cup goal for his team on 26 October in the third round away game as Basel won 4–1 against Tuggen. Under trainer Urs Fischer Balanta won the Swiss Super League championship at the end of the 2016–17 Super League season. For the club this was the eighth title in a row and their 20th championship title in total. They also won the Swiss Cup for the twelfth time, which meant they had won the double for the sixth time in the club's history. Balanta had played 19 league games and one in the cup.

In their following 2017–18 season under new head coach Raphaël Wicky Balanta received somewhat less playing time, but played in 15 league games and in all six games in the 2017–18 UEFA Champions League group stage.

Under trainer Marcel Koller Basel won the Swiss Cup in the 2018–19 season. In the first round Basel beat Montlingen 3–0, in the second round Echallens Région 7–2 and in the round of 16 Winterthur 1–0. In the quarter-finals Sion were defeated 4–2 after extra time and in the semi-finals Zürich 3–1. All these games were played away from home. The final was held on 19 May 2019 in the Stade de Suisse Wankdorf Bern against Thun. Albian Ajeti scored the first goal, Fabian Frei the second for Basel, then Dejan Sorgić netted a goal for Thun, but the result was 2–1 for Basel. Balanta played five Cup games and scored a goal in the match against Montlingen.

At the beginning of their following season Balanta decided to leave the club. In his three and a bit seasons with the club, Balanta played a total of 113 games for Basel scoring a total of six goals. 58 of these games were in the Swiss Super League, nine in the Swiss Cup, 22 in the UEFA competitions (Champions League and Europa League) and 24 were friendly games. He scored three goals in the domestic league, two in the cup and the other was scored during the test games.

=== Club Brugge ===
On 2 September 2019, he signed three-year contract with Club Brugge.

==== Schalke 04 (loan) ====
On 31 January 2023, Balanta joined Bundesliga club Schalke 04 on loan until the end of the season.

=== América de Cali ===
On 27 June 2024, Balanta joined a Colombian club for the first time, signing with América de Cali.

== International career ==
Álvarez Balanta attracted the attention of the Colombian Football Federation in May 2013 during his time with River Plate. He was called to be part of the U-20 squad for the 2013 FIFA U-20 World Cup in Turkey. Due to injuries and the factor that he had yet to sign his first professional contract, River Plate stated that they would not allow him to partake with the national youth squad if he does not meet with his youth contract before signing a senior contract. In June 2013, it was confirmed that River Plate would not allow him to take part in the U-20 World Cup.

On 7 November 2013, Álvarez Balanta received his first senior call-up to play friendlies against Belgium and the Netherlands. On his second call-up, Álvarez Balanta made his international debut, coming in at the 65th minute in a friendly against Tunisia.

On 6 June 2014, Álvarez Balanta was named by head coach José Pékerman in Colombia's 23-man squad for the 2014 World Cup.

== Style of play ==
"Balanta is worth €15 million; he is a great player with a great future. I think that Balanta would be liked by Tata Martino, as it would not seem odd to me if Barca are interested in him. He is a player that will come good whichever team he plays for. Balanta is not like Mascherano nor like Piqué; he is a different sort of player with more presence. He is a strong defender, is good on the ball and knows how to play going forward."

— River Plate vice president Omar Solassi over Álvarez Balanta and his recent alleged links towards Barcelona

Álvarez Balanta has been highlighted with top praise in Argentina. Since debuting in top-tier Argentinean football, Álvarez Balanta has been deemed as the "best defender" in the league, earning that title within half of his debuting season. Compared to other Colombian legends, he has been referenced for Jorge Bermúdez's hierarchy while having speed and agility to that of Iván Córdoba, all while also carrying wonderful strength and balance. Thus, he is often credited as a complete center-back. Left-footed, Álvarez Balanta has shown that he can play with his right as well. These talents had even made former River Plate coach Ramón Díaz, compare Álvarez Balanta's talents to that of legendary Daniel Passarella.

In response to his sudden rise in popularity and praise, Álvarez Balanta has been shown to be quite modest:

"I am not as skillful as everyone thinks I am; I understand that people are excited for me and what I can do which is good, as it proves that I am on the right path and that my hard work is paying off. However, I am really just 'normal' and not a 'star', yet. People are often asking me when 'I will go to Barcelona' and it makes me feel uncomfortable because I am still young and learning. But the rumors that run around often make me feel as if my head will explode. It puts stress on my mind when I am trying to focus on River Plate and possibly get the chance to represent Colombia. It's a dream of mine to play for Colombia during a World Cup, but I cannot make it if I don't continue working hard."

== Career statistics ==
=== Club ===
As of match played 1 April 2023.

Appearances and goals by club, season and competition
Club	Season	League			Cup		Continental (Note: Appearances in Copa Sudamericana, Copa Libertadores, UEFA Champions League and UEFA Europa League)		Other (Note: Appearances in FIFA Club World Cup and Belgian Super Cup)		Total	
Club	Season	Division	Apps	Goals	Apps	Goals	Apps	Goals	Apps	Goals	Apps	Goals
River Plate	2012–13	Argentine Primera División	9	2	0	0	—		—		3	0
River Plate	2013–14	Argentine Primera División	29	0	0	0	4	0	—		33	0
River Plate	2014	Argentine Primera División	2	0	0	0	1	0	—		3	0
River Plate	2015	Argentine Primera División	11	0	1	0	9	1	2	0	23	1
River Plate	2016	Argentine Primera División	9	0	0	0	6	0	—		15	0
River Plate	Total		60	2	1	0	20	1	2	0	83	3
Basel	2016–17	Swiss Super League	19	1	1	1	6	0	—		26	2
Basel	2017–18	Swiss Super League	15	0	3	0	6	0	—		26	2
Basel	2018–19	Swiss Super League	20	2	5	1	6	0	—		31	3
Basel	2019–20	Swiss Super League	4	0	0	0	4	0	—		8	0
Basel	Total		58	3	9	2	22	0	—		89	5
Club Brugge	2019–20	Belgian First Division A	16	2	5	1	6	0	—		27	3
Club Brugge	2020–21	Belgian First Division A	25	1	3	0	6	0	—		34	1
Club Brugge	2021–22	Belgian First Division A	29	1	3	2	5	0	1	0	38	3
Club Brugge	2022–23	Belgian First Division A	9	0	0	0	4	0	—		13	0
Club Brugge	Total		79	4	11	3	21	0	1	0	112	7
Schalke 04 (loan)	2022–23	Bundesliga	6	0	—		—		—		6	0
Career total			203	9	21	5	63	1	3	0	290	15

=== International ===
As of match played 5 June 2022

Appearances and goals by national team and year
National team	Year	Apps	Goals
Colombia	2014	5	0
Colombia	2015	1	0
Colombia	2016	1	0
Colombia	2017	1	0
Colombia	2018	0	0
Colombia	2019	0	0
Colombia	2020	0	0
Colombia	2021	0	0
Colombia	2022	1	0
Total		9	0

== Honours ==
River Plate Youth

- U-20 Copa Libertadores: 2012

River Plate

- Argentine Primera División: 2014 Final
- Copa Libertadores: 2015
- Copa Sudamericana: 2014
- Recopa Sudamericana: 2015
- FIFA Club World Cup runner-up: 2015

Basel

- Swiss Super League: 2016–17
- Swiss Cup: 2016–17, 2018–19

Club Brugge

- Belgian First Division A: 2019–20, 2020–21, 2021–22
- Belgian Super Cup: 2021
