= Kemal Ademi =

Swiss footballer (born 1996)

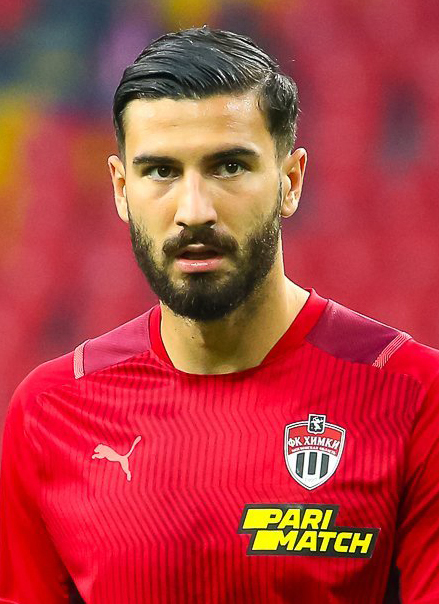
- Ademi with Khimki in 2021

Personal information
- Date of birth: 23 January 1996 (age 30)
- Place of birth: Villingen-Schwenningen, Germany
- Height: 1.98 m (6 ft 6 in)
- Position: Centre-forward

Team information
- Current team: Osijek
- Number: 9

Youth career
- Herisau
- –2014: St. Gallen

Senior career*
Years	Team	Apps	(Gls)
2014–2016	St. Gallen U21	13	(4)
2015–2016	→ 1899 Hoffenheim II (loan)	15	(0)
2016–2018	1899 Hoffenheim II	19	(3)
2018–2019	Neuchâtel Xamax	26	(8)
2019–2020	Basel	26	(13)
2020–2021	Fenerbahçe	7	(0)
2021	→ Fatih Karagümrük (loan)	6	(0)
2021–2023	Khimki	13	(1)
2022	→ SC Paderborn (loan)	6	(1)
2022–2023	→ SV Sandhausen (loan)	16	(1)
2023–2024	Luzern	15	(1)
2024–	Osijek	11	(0)
- * Club domestic league appearances and goals as of 1 June 2025

Kemal Ademi (born 23 January 1996) is a Swiss professional footballer who plays as a centre-forward for Croatian club Osijek.

== Club career ==
=== Neuchâtel Xamax ===
On 5 July 2018, Ademi signed his first professional contract with Swiss Super League side Neuchâtel Xamax after agreeing to a one-year deal with the option of continuation for another year. After a month, he made his debut as professional footballer in a 3–0 away defeat against Sion after coming on as a substitute at 46th minute in place of Tunahan Cicek.

=== Basel ===
On 15 June 2019, Ademi signed a four-year contract with Swiss Super League club Basel. Ademi joined Basel's first team for their 2019–20 season under head coach Marcel Koller. One month later, after playing in three test games, he was named as a Basel substitute for the first time in a league match against Sion but did not play. He played his debut with in the team four days later in the 2019–20 UEFA Champions League second qualifying round against the Dutch side PSV Eindhoven in the Philips Stadion on 23 July 2019. He came on as a substitute in the 89th minute, replacing Albian Ajeti. Four days after debut, on 27 July, he scored his first goal for his new club in the home game in the St. Jakob Stadium. But this could not help the team, as Basel were defeated 1–2 by St. Gallen.

Ademi left the club during the transfer window of the next season. During his short period with the club, Ademi played a total of 52 games for Basel scoring a total of 16 goals. 26 of these games were in the Swiss Super League, five in the Swiss Cup, three in the Champions League, ten in the Europa League and eight were friendly games. He scored 13 goals in the domestic league, one in the Swiss Cup and the afore mentioned goal in the Champions League. The other were scored during the test games.

=== Fenerbahçe ===
On 5 October 2020, Ademi signed a three-year contract with Süper Lig club Fenerbahçe and received squad number 99. Thirteen days later, he was named as a Fenerbahçe substitute for the first time in a league match against Göztepe. His debut with Fenerbahçe came seven days later in a 3–1 home win against Trabzonspor after coming on as a substitute at 88th minute in place of Mbwana Samatta. One month after debut, Ademi scored his first goal for Fenerbahçe in his fourth appearance for the club in a 4–0 home win over Sivas Belediyespor.

==== Loan at Fatih Karagümrük ====
On 1 February 2021, Ademi was loaned to Süper Lig side Fatih Karagümrük until the end of the season. Two days later, he made his debut in a 2–0 home win against Gaziantep after being named in the starting line-up.

=== Khimki ===
On 10 August 2021, Ademi signed a three-year contract with Russian Premier League club Khimki and received squad number 9. Six days later, he made his debut in a 3–0 away defeat against Sochi after coming on as a substitute at 83rd minute in place of Denis Glushakov.

On 16 August 2022, Ademi moved to SV Sandhausen in Germany for the 2022–23 season.

=== Luzern ===
On 30 June 2023, Ademi returned to Switzerland and signed a two-year contract with Luzern. On 1 July 2024, his contract with Luzern was terminated by mutual consent after just one season. In 20 games for Luzern, he scored just two goals, two of which he scored in Conference League qualifying, and supplied one assist.

== International career ==
Ademi was born in Villingen-Schwenningen, Germany and raised in Herisau, Switzerland to Albanian parents from Prizren. He was eligible to play for Kosovo, Albania and Switzerland internationally, as well as Germany, his birthplace. On 25 June 2020, the Swiss Football Association announced that FIFA accepted Ademi's request to play for Switzerland after staying in the country for almost fourteen years.

== Career statistics ==
=== Club ===
As of 25 May 2024

Appearances and goals by club, season and competition
Club	Season	League			Cup		Continental		Other		Total	
Club	Season	Division	Apps	Goals	Apps	Goals	Apps	Goals	Apps	Goals	Apps	Goals
St. Gallen U21	2014–15	Swiss Promotion League	13	4	0	0	—		—		13	4
1899 Hoffenheim II (loan)	2015–16	Regionalliga Südwest	15	0	0	0	—		—		15	0
1899 Hoffenheim II	2016–17	Regionalliga Südwest	19	3	0	0	—		—		19	3
1899 Hoffenheim II	2017–18	Regionalliga Südwest	0	0	0	0	—		—		0	0
1899 Hoffenheim II	Total		19	3	0	0	0	0	0	0	19	3
Neuchâtel Xamax	2018–19	Swiss Super League	26	8	3	1	—		2 (Note: Appearance in 2018–19 Swiss Super League relegation play-offs)	1	31	10
Basel	2019–20	Swiss Super League	26	13	5	1	12	1	—		43	15
Basel	2020–21	Swiss Super League	0	0	0	0	2	0	—		2	0
Basel	Total		26	13	5	1	14	1	0	0	45	15
Fenerbahçe	2020–21	Süper Lig	7	0	1	1	—		—		8	1
Fatih Karagümrük (loan)	2020–21	Süper Lig	6	0	0	0	—		—		6	0
Khimki	2021–22	Russian Premier League	12	1	1	0	—		—		13	1
Khimki	2022–23	Russian Premier League	1	0	—		—		—		1	0
Khimki	Total		13	1	1	0	0	0	0	0	14	1
SC Paderborn (loan)	2021–22	2. Bundesliga	6	1	—		—		—		6	1
SV Sandhausen (loan)	2022–23	2. Bundesliga	6	0	1	0	—		—		7	0
FC Luzern	2023–24	Swiss Super League	15	1	1	0	4 (Note: Appearances in the UEFA Europa Conference League)	2	—		20	3
Career total			152	31	12	3	18	3	2	1	164	38
