= Elis Isufi =

Swiss footballer (born 2000)

Personal information
- Date of birth: 21 May 2000 (age 26)
- Place of birth: Liestal, Switzerland
- Height: 1.86 m (6 ft 1 in)
- Position: Defender

Team information
- Current team: Baden
- Number: 5

Youth career
- 2009–2012: Pratteln
- 2012–2020: Basel

Senior career*
Years	Team	Apps	(Gls)
2018–2021	Basel II	40	(2)
2019–2021	Basel	6	(0)
2021–2023	Kriens	58	(0)
2023–	Baden	23	(0)

International career^{‡}
2015	Switzerland U16	4	(0)
2017	Switzerland U17	4	(1)
2017–2018	Switzerland U18	4	(0)
2017–2019	Switzerland U19	12	(1)
2019	Switzerland U20	1	(0)
- * Club domestic league appearances and goals as of 28 May 2024 ‡ National team caps and goals as of 04:54, 14 March 2021 (UTC)

Elis Isufi (born 21 May 2000) is a Swiss footballer who plays as a defender for Baden.

== Club career ==
Born in Liestal, Vishi played his early football by local club FC Pratteln and moved to the youth section of FC Basel in 2012. Since then he has passed through all of the club's the junior levels. In the 2018/2019 season he made a total of 19 appearances, scoring one goal and in the 2019/2020 season he made a total of 15 appearances, also scoring one goal, with the U21 team in the Swiss Promotion League, the third tier of the Swiss football league system.

In Basel's 2019–20 season Isufi made his professional debut with his club in the Swiss Cup on 14 September 2019. Head coach Marcel Koller let Isufi play next to Emil Bergström as centre backs and they helped keep a clean sheet as Basel won 3–0 against FC Meyrin. Isufi's following appearance was in a 1-0 UEFA Europa League win over APOEL FC on 27 February 2020.

After these two games and three further test matches, Isufi Aplayed his domestic league debut for the club in the home game in the St. Jakob-Park on 4 July 2020 as Basel won 2–0 against Xamax.

On 15 June 2021, he joined Kriens.

On 16 June 2023, Isufi signed a contract with Baden.

== International career ==
Born in Switzerland, Isufi is of Kosovo-Albanian descent. He is a youth international for Switzerland.
