= Omar Alderete =

Paraguayan footballer (born 1996)

- Alderete with Paraguay in 2026

Personal information
- Full name: Omar Federico Alderete Fernández
- Date of birth: 26 December 1996 (age 29)
- Place of birth: Asunción, Paraguay
- Height: 1.88 m (6 ft 2 in)
- Positions: Centre-back; left-back

Team information
- Current team: Sunderland
- Number: 15

Youth career
- –2016: Cerro Porteño

Senior career*
| Years | Team | Apps | (Gls) |
| 2016–2018 | Cerro Porteño | 17 | (1) |
| 2017–2018 | → Gimnasia y Esgrima (loan) | 22 | (1) |
| 2018–2019 | Huracán | 8 | (1) |
| 2019–2020 | Basel | 31 | (2) |
| 2020–2023 | Hertha BSC | 17 | (0) |
| 2021–2022 | → Valencia (loan) | 29 | (2) |
| 2022–2023 | → Getafe (loan) | 25 | (1) |
| 2023–2025 | Getafe | 65 | (1) |
| 2025– | Sunderland | 37 | (1) |

International career^{‡}
| 2013 | Paraguay U17 | 8 | (0) |
| 2015 | Paraguay U20 | 7 | (0) |
| 2016 | Paraguay U23 | 4 | (2) |
| 2018– | Paraguay | 42 | (3) |
- * Club domestic league appearances and goals as of 31 October 2026 ‡ National team caps and goals as of 2 October 2026

Omar Federico Alderete Fernández (born 26 December 1996) is a Paraguayan professional footballer who plays as a defender for Premier League club Sunderland and the Paraguay national team. Mainly a centre-back, he can also play as a left-back.

== Club career ==
=== Early career ===
Alderete began his career with Cerro Porteño, he played for their U20s at the 2016 U-20 Copa Libertadores between January and February 2016 where he scored one goal (vs. Bolívar) in three games. Months later, in May 2016, Alderete made his professional debut for the club in a Paraguayan Primera División loss to Rubio Ñu. In his third league appearance, he scored his first senior goal in an away win versus Guaraní on 31 July. In August 2017, Alderete joined Argentine Primera División side Gimnasia y Esgrima on loan. His first appearance came in a 4–4 draw with Defensa y Justicia on 26 August.

=== Huracán and Basel ===
After one goal in twenty-two matches for Gimnasia y Esgrima, Alderete completed a transfer to Huracán at the conclusion of his loan spell.

On 4 June 2019, Alderete agreed a move to Swiss Super League outfit Basel; with the deal officially going through on 11 June. Alderete joined Basel's first team for their 2019–20 FC Basel season under head coach Marcel Koller. After playing in five test games, Alderete played his domestic league debut for the club in the away game in the Stade Tourbillon on 19 July 2019 as Basel won 4–1 against FC Sion. He scored his first goal for his team four days later, on 23 July 2019, in the away game in the Philips Stadion in the second qualifying round of the 2019–20 UEFA Champions League. But this could not help the team, as Basel were defeated 2–3 by PSV Eindhoven, who scored two goals in the last minutes of the game.

Alderete left the club during the transfer window of the next season. During his short period with the club Alderete played a total of 64 games for Basel scoring a total of four goals. 31 of these games were in the Swiss Super League, six in the Swiss Cup, four in the Champions League, 13 in the Europa League and 10 were friendly games. He scored two goals in the domestic league, one in the Swiss Cup and one in the Champions League.

=== Hertha BSC ===
On 5 October 2020, Alderete signed a long-term deal with Hertha BSC. He made his debut in a 2–1 debut at the Red Bull Arena against RB Leipzig on 24 October. On 12 July 2021, Alderete signed with Valencia CF on a season-long loan with the option to buy.

=== Getafe ===
On 19 August 2022, Alderete joined Getafe on loan with an option to buy. On 25 May of the following year, he signed a permanent five-year contract with the club.

=== Sunderland ===
On 12 August 2025, Premier League side Sunderland announced the signing of Alderete on a four-year contract for an undisclosed fee. On 27 September, he scored his first goal for the club in a 1–0 away victory over Nottingham Forest in the Premier League.

== International career ==
Alderete has represented Paraguay at U17, U20 and U23 level. He won eight caps for the U17 team at the 2013 South American Under-17 Football Championship in Argentina, prior to winning seven caps for the U20s at the 2015 South American Youth Football Championship in Uruguay.

In May 2016, Alderete played four times for the U23s at the 2016 Toulon Tournament in France, scoring one goal in a win over Guinea on 19 May. He was called up to train with Juan Carlos Osorio's senior squad in 2018.

Omar Alderete made his debut for the Paraguay national team on 20 November 2018 in a friendly match against South Africa. He started the match, and the game ended in a 1–1 draw.

On 1 June 2026, he was named by head coach Gustavo Alfaro in Paraguay's 26-man squad for the 2026 FIFA World Cup.

== Career statistics ==
=== Club ===
As of match played 5 November 2026

Appearances and goals by club, season and competition
| Club | Season | League | | | National cup (Note: Includes Swiss Cup, Copa del Rey, FA Cup) | | League cup (Note: Includes Copa de la Superliga, EFL Cup) | | Continental | | Total | |
| Club | Season | Division | Apps | Goals | Apps | Goals | Apps | Goals | Apps | Goals | Apps | Goals |
|---|---|---|---|---|---|---|---|---|---|---|---|---|
| Cerro Porteño | 2016 | Paraguayan Primera División | 8 | 1 | 0 | 0 | — | | 4 (Note: Appearance(s) in Copa Sudamericana) | 0 | 12 | 1 |
| Cerro Porteño | 2017 | Paraguayan Primera División | 9 | 0 | 0 | 0 | — | | 1 | 0 | 10 | 0 |
| Cerro Porteño | 2018 | Paraguayan Primera División | 0 | 0 | 0 | 0 | — | | 0 | 0 | 0 | 0 |
| Cerro Porteño | Total | | 17 | 1 | 0 | 0 | — | | 5 | 0 | 22 | 1 |
| Gimnasia y Esgrima (loan) | 2017–18 | Argentine Primera División | 22 | 1 | 0 | 0 | — | | — | | 22 | 1 |
| Huracán | 2018–19 | Argentine Primera División | 8 | 0 | 0 | 0 | 2 | 0 | 5 (Note: Appearances in Copa Libertadores) | 0 | 15 | 0 |
| Basel | 2019–20 | Swiss Super League | 28 | 2 | 6 | 1 | — | | 14 (Note: Four appearances and one goal in UEFA Champions League, ten appearances in UEFA Europa League) | 1 | 48 | 4 |
| Basel | 2020–21 | Swiss Super League | 3 | 0 | — | | — | | 3 (Note: Appearances in UEFA Europa League) | 0 | 6 | 0 |
| Basel | Total | | 31 | 2 | 6 | 1 | — | | 17 | 1 | 54 | 4 |
| Hertha BSC | 2020–21 | Bundesliga | 17 | 0 | — | | — | | — | | 17 | 0 |
| Valencia (loan) | 2021–22 | La Liga | 29 | 2 | 5 | 0 | — | | — | | 34 | 2 |
| Getafe (loan) | 2022–23 | La Liga | 25 | 1 | 3 | 0 | — | | — | | 28 | 1 |
| Getafe | 2023–24 | La Liga | 31 | 0 | 4 | 0 | — | | — | | 35 | 0 |
| Getafe | 2024–25 | La Liga | 34 | 1 | 2 | 0 | — | | — | | 36 | 1 |
| Getafe | Getafe total | | 90 | 2 | 9 | 0 | — | | — | | 99 | 2 |
| Sunderland | 2025–26 | Premier League | 33 | 1 | 1 | 0 | 0 | 0 | — | | 34 | 1 |
| Sunderland | 2026–27 | Premier League | 4 | 0 | 0 | 0 | 2 | 0 | 3 | 0 | 9 | 0 |
| Sunderland | Total | | 37 | 1 | 1 | 0 | 2 | 0 | 3 | 0 | 43 | 1 |
| Career total | | | 250 | 9 | 21 | 1 | 4 | 0 | 30 | 1 | 305 | 11 |

=== International ===
As of match played 2 October 2026

Appearances and goals by national team and year
| National team | Year | Apps | Goals |
|---|---|---|---|
| Paraguay | 2018 | 1 | 0 |
| Paraguay | 2020 | 2 | 0 |
| Paraguay | 2021 | 7 | 0 |
| Paraguay | 2022 | 2 | 0 |
| Paraguay | 2023 | 3 | 0 |
| Paraguay | 2024 | 10 | 2 |
| Paraguay | 2025 | 8 | 1 |
| Paraguay | 2026 | 9 | 0 |
| Total | | 42 | 3 |

Scores and results list Paraguay's goal tally first, score column indicates score after each Alderete goal.

List of international goals scored by Omar Alderete
| No. | Date | Venue | Opponent | Score | Result | Competition |
|---|---|---|---|---|---|---|
| 1 | 28 June 2024 | Allegiant Stadium, Las Vegas, United States | Brazil | 1–3 | 1–4 | 2024 Copa América |
| 2 | 14 November 2024 | Estadio Defensores del Chaco, Asunción, Paraguay | Argentina | 2–1 | 2–1 | 2026 FIFA World Cup qualification |
| 3 | 20 March 2025 | Estadio Defensores del Chaco, Asunción, Paraguay | Chile | 1–0 | 1–0 | 2026 FIFA World Cup qualification |

== Honours ==
Individual

- Swiss Super League Team of the Year: 2019–20
- Paraguayan Footballer of the Year: 2025
