= Jasper van der Werff =

Swiss footballer (born 1998)

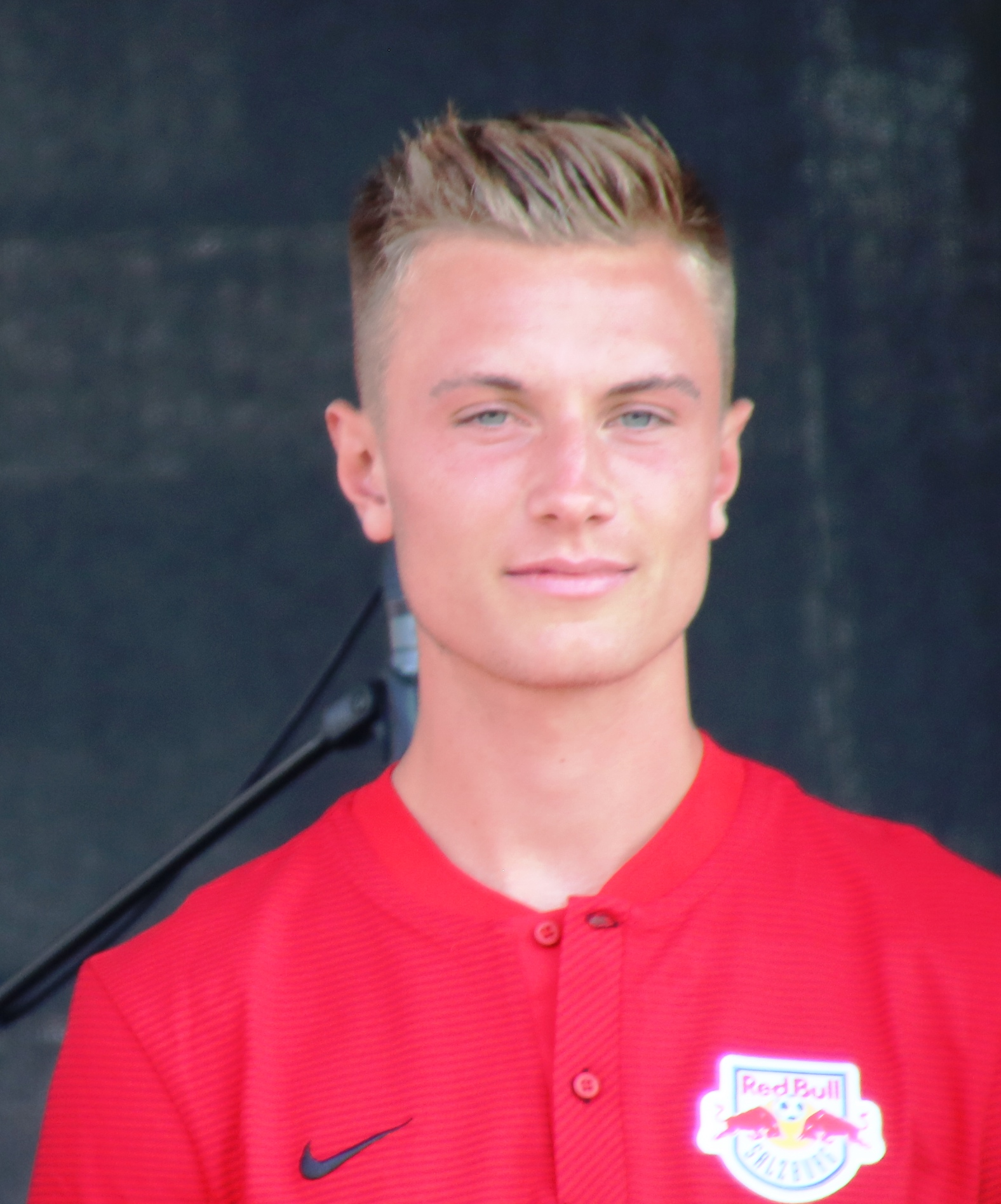
- Van der Werff in 2018

Personal information
- Date of birth: 9 December 1998 (age 27)
- Place of birth: St. Gallen, Switzerland
- Height: 1.88 m (6 ft 2 in)
- Positions: Defender; defensive midfielder

Team information
- Current team: Aarau
- Number: 21

Youth career
- –2008: FC Speicher
- 2008–2016: St. Gallen

Senior career*
Years	Team	Apps	(Gls)
2016–2017	St. Gallen U21	23	(3)
2018	St. Gallen	9	(0)
2018–2022	Red Bull Salzburg	4	(0)
2018–2019	Liefering	12	(0)
2020–2021	→ Basel (loan)	34	(1)
2021–2022	→ SC Paderborn (loan)	30	(0)
2022–2024	SC Paderborn	7	(0)
2023–2024	→ Hansa Rostock (loan)	21	(2)
2024–2026	Universitatea Cluj	12	(0)
2026–	Aarau	1	(0)

International career
2014	Switzerland U16	2	(0)
2018–2021	Switzerland U21	9	(0)
- * Club domestic league appearances and goals as of 24 July 2026

Jasper van der Werff (born 9 December 1998) is a Swiss professional footballer who plays as a defender or a defensive midfielder for Swiss Challenge League club Aarau.

== Club career ==
Van der Werff made his professional debut for St. Gallen in a 2–0 Swiss Super League win over Basel on 17 February 2018. In the summer of 2018 van der Werff transferred to Red Bull Salzburg and he was loaned to FC Liefering.

On 9 January 2020, Basel announced that they had loan contracted van der Werff for one and a half seasons. After three test games van der Werff played his domestic league debut for his new club in the home game at the St. Jakob-Park on 2 February as Basel were defeated 2–1 by St. Gallen. He scored his first goal for the club on 21 January 2021 in the home game in the St. Jakob-Park against Lugano. It was the last goal of the game in the 89th minute and the equaliser as Basel managed a 2–2 draw.

Van der Werff left the club as the contract ended. During his 18 months with the club, Van der Werff played a total of 50 games for Basel scoring the afore mentioned one goal. 34 of these games were in the Swiss Super League, four in the Swiss Cup, five in the UEFA Europa League and seven were friendly games.

On 19 May 2022, van der Werff signed with SC Paderborn on a permanent basis after playing at the club on loan in the previous season. On 20 July 2023, van der Werff was loaned to Hansa Rostock for one season.

On 6 August 2024, van der Werff signed with Universitatea Cluj in Romania.

== International career ==
Van der Werff was born in Switzerland to Dutch parents who had moved to Speicher, Switzerland the previous year. He grew up in Speicher and represented the Switzerland U16 twice in 2014.

== Career statistics ==
=== Club ===
As of match played 24 July 2026

Club	Season	League			National Cup (Note: Includes Swiss Cup, Austrian Cup, DFB-Pokal, Cupa României)		Europe		Other		Total	
Club	Season	Division	Apps	Goals	Apps	Goals	Apps	Goals	Apps	Goals	Apps	Goals
St. Gallen U21	2016–17	Swiss 1. Liga	12	3	–		–		–		12	3
St. Gallen U21	2017–18	Swiss 1. Liga	11	0	–		–		–		11	0
St. Gallen U21	Total		23	3	–		–		–		23	3
St. Gallen	2017–18	Swiss Super League	9	0	–		–		–		9	0
Red Bull Salzburg	2018–19	Austrian Bundesliga	4	0	1	0	0	0	–		5	0
Red Bull Salzburg	2019–20	Austrian Bundesliga	0	0	0	0	0	0	–		0	0
Red Bull Salzburg	Total		4	0	1	0	0	0	–		5	0
Liefering	2018–19	2. Liga	3	0	–		–		–		3	0
Liefering	2019–20	2. Liga	9	0	–		–		–		9	0
Liefering	Total		12	0	–		–		–		12	0
Basel (loan)	2019–20	Swiss Super League	14	0	3	0	3 (Note: Appearances in UEFA Europa League)	0	–		20	0
Basel (loan)	2020–21	Swiss Super League	20	1	1	0	2	0	–		23	1
Basel (loan)	Total		34	1	4	0	5	0	–		43	1
SC Paderborn (loan)	2021–22	2. Bundesliga	30	0	0	0	–		–		30	0
SC Paderborn	2022–23	2. Bundesliga	7	0	0	0	–		–		7	0
SC Paderborn	Total		37	0	0	0	–		–		37	0
Hansa Rostock (loan)	2023–24	2. Bundesliga	21	2	2	0	–		–		23	2
Universitatea Cluj	2024–25	Liga I	12	0	1	0	–		–		13	0
Universitatea Cluj	2025–26	Liga I	0	0	0	0	0	0	–		0	0
Universitatea Cluj	Total		12	0	1	0	0	0	–		13	0
Aarau	2026–27	Swiss Challenge League	1	0	0	0	–		–		1	0
Career total			153	6	8	0	5	0	–		166	6

== Honours ==
Red Bull Salzburg

- Austrian Bundesliga: 2018–19
- Austrian Cup: 2018–19

Basel

- Swiss Cup runner-up: 2019–20

Universitatea Cluj

- Cupa României runner-up: 2025–26
