= 2018–19 Swiss Cup =

Tournament details
- Country: Switzerland
- Teams: 64

Final positions
- Champions: Basel (13th title)
- Runners-up: Thun

The 2018–19 Swiss Cup was the 94th season of Switzerland's annual football cup competition. The competition began on 18 August 2018 with the first games of Round 1 and ended on 19 May 2019 with the final. The Super League side Zürich were the defending champion but they were eliminated by eventual winners Basel in the semi-final on 25 April 2019.

== Participating clubs ==
All teams from 2017–18 Super League and 2017–18 Challenge League as well as the top 4 teams from 2017–18 Promotion League automatically entered this year's competition. The remaining 41 teams had to qualify through separate qualifying rounds within their leagues. Reserve teams and teams from Liechtenstein are not allowed in the competition, the latter only enter the 2018–19 Liechtenstein Cup.

2018–19 Super League; 10 teams	2018–19 Challenge League; 9 teams	2018–19 Promotion League; 9 teams	2018–19 1. Liga; 10 teams	2018–19 2. Liga Interregional; 12 teams	2018–19 Regional leagues 14 teams
FC Basel (BS); Grasshopper Zürich (ZH); FC Lugano (TI); FC Luzern (LU); Neuchâtel Xamax FCS (NE); FC Sion (VS); FC St. Gallen (SG); FC Thun (BE); BSC Young Boys (BE); FC Zürich^{TH} (ZH)	FC Aarau (AG); FC Chiasso (TI); SC Kriens (LU); FC Lausanne-Sport (VD); FC Rapperswil-Jona (SG); FC Schaffhausen (SH); Servette FC (GE); FC Wil (SG); FC Winterthur (ZH)	FC Bavois (VD); AC Bellinzona (TI); FC Breitenrain (BE); SC Cham (ZG); FC Köniz (BE); FC Stade Nyonnais (VD); FC Wohlen (AG); SC YF Juventus (ZH); Yverdon Sport FC (VD)	FC Azzurri 90 LS (VD); FC Biel-Bienne (BE); SC Buochs (NW); FC Échallens Région (VD); SC Goldau (SZ); FC Kosova (ZH); Meyrin FC (GE); FC Red Star Zürich (ZH); FC Solothurn (SO); Zug 94 (ZG)	FC Amriswil (TG); FC Dietikon (ZH); FC Frauenfeld (TG); FC Freienbach (SZ); FC Moutier (BE); FC Muri (AG); AS Novazzano (TI); FC Portalban/Gletterens (FR); FC Ueberstorf (FR); FC Uzwil (SG); FC Veyrier Sports (GE); FC Willisau (LU)	Sixth tier: FC Bellach (SO); FC Bramois (VS); FC Concordia Basel (BS); FC Fleurier (NE); FC Gland (VD); FC Grand-Saconnex (GE); FC Greifensee (ZH); FC Klingnau (AG); FC Montlingen (SG); FC Nidau (BE); Seventh tier: FC Langnau (BE); AC Malcantone (TI); FC Meilen (ZH); Eighth tier: FC Erde (VS)

^{TH} Title holders.

== Round 1 ==
Teams from Super League and Challenge League were seeded in this round. In a match, the home advantage was granted to the team from the lower league, if applicable. Teams in bold continue to the next round of the competition.

Team 1	Score	Team 2
**18 August 2018**
FC Willisau (5)	1–3	**FC Breitenrain** (3)
FC Frauenfeld (5)	0–5	**FC Rapperswil-Jona** (2)
FC Solothurn (4)	0–2	**FC Stade Nyonnais** (3)
Zug 94 (4)	1–2	**FC Red Star Zürich** (4)
FC Amriswil (5)	1–2 (a.e.t.)	**FC Aarau** (2)
FC Veyrier Sports (5)	1–5	**FC Thun** (1)
SC Goldau (4)	1–3	**FC Bavois** (3)
AC Malcantone (7)	0–2	**FC Moutier** (5)
FC Uzwil (5)	0–3	**FC Wil** (2)
FC Bellach (6)	0–7	**FC Chiasso** (2)
**AC Bellinzona** (3)	4–0	SC YF Juventus (3)
FC Concordia Basel (6)	0–6	**FC Zürich** (1)
FC Kosova (4)	0–4	**FC Lausanne-Sport** (2)
FC Greifensee (6)	0–3	**FC Winterthur** (2)
FC Langnau (7)	0–6	**SC Kriens** (2)
FC Meilen (7)	0–6	**Servette FC** (2)
Meyrin FC (4)	1–6	**SC Cham** (3)
AS Novazzano (5)	0–4	**FC Échallens Région** (4)
FC Erde (8)	1–5	**FC Azzurri 90 LS** (4)
FC Montlingen (6)	0–3	**FC Basel** (1)
FC Grand-Saconnex (6)	3–5	**FC Muri** (5)
FC Köniz (3)	0–2	**FC Sion** (1)
FC Portalban/Gletterens (5)	3–4 (a.e.t.)	**FC Wohlen** (3)
FC Biel-Bienne (4)	2–3 (a.e.t.)	**BSC Young Boys** (1)
**19 August 2018**
SC Buochs (4)	0–2	**Grasshopper Club Zürich** (1)
FC Freienbach (5)	0–5	**FC Schaffhausen** (2)
FC Dietikon (5)	0–4	**FC Lugano** (1)
FC Ueberstorf (5)	0–6	**FC St. Gallen** (1)
FC Gland (6)	1–9	**FC Luzern** (1)
**FC Fleurier** (6)	3–1	FC Nidau (6)
**FC Klingnau** (6)	7–0	FC Bramois (6)
Yverdon Sport FC (3)	0–1	**Neuchâtel Xamax FCS** (1)

== Round 2 ==
The winners of Round 1 played in this round. Teams from Super League were seeded, the home advantage was granted to the team from the lower league, if applicable. Teams in bold continue to the third round.

Team 1	Score	Team 2
**14 September 2018**
FC Bavois (3)	2–3 (a.e.t.)	**FC Rapperswil-Jona** (2)
**15 September 2018**
FC Échallens Région (4)	2–7	**FC Basel** (1)
**FC Red Star Zürich** (4)	1–0	SC Cham (3)
AC Bellinzona (3)	1–2	**FC Winterthur** (2)
Servette FC (2)	3–3 (4–5 p)	**FC Luzern** (1)
FC Wohlen (3)	0–1	**FC Wil** (2)
FC Breitenrain (3)	2–4	**FC Zürich** (1)
FC Schaffhausen (2)	2–3 (a.e.t.)	**BSC Young Boys** (1)
FC Azzurri 90 LS (4)	0–1	**FC Lugano** (1)
**16 September 2018**
FC Moutier (5)	1–3	**FC Thun** (1)
**FC Stade Nyonnais** (3)	3–1	Grasshopper Club Zürich (1)
FC Aarau (2)	1–2	**Neuchâtel Xamax FCS** (1)
FC Fleurier (6)	1–4	**SC Kriens** (2)
FC Klingnau (6)	0–2 (a.e.t.)	**FC Chiasso** (2)
FC Lausanne-Sport (2)	0–1	**FC Sion** (1)
FC Muri (5)	0–7	**FC St. Gallen** (1)

== Round 3 ==
The winners of Round 2 played in this round. No team was seeded, the home advantage was granted to the team from the lower league, if applicable. Teams in bold continue to the quarter-finals.

Team 1	Score	Team 2
**31 October 2018**
FC Stade Nyonnais (3)	0–1	**BSC Young Boys** (1)
FC Red Star Zürich (4)	2–3	**FC Zürich** (1)
FC Wil (2)	1–1 (2–4 p)	**FC Thun** (1)
FC Winterthur (2)	0–1	**FC Basel** (1)
**FC Lugano** (1)	3–1 (a.e.t.)	Neuchâtel Xamax FCS (1)
**1 November 2018**
FC Chiasso (2)	0–2	**FC Luzern** (1)
FC Rapperswil-Jona (2)	1–4	**SC Kriens** (2)
FC St. Gallen (1)	1–2 (a.e.t.)	**FC Sion** (1)

== Quarter-finals ==
The winners of Round 3 played in this round. No team was seeded, the home advantage was granted to the team from the lower league, if applicable. Teams in bold continue to the Semi-finals.

27 February 2019	FC Sion	**2–4** (a.e.t.)	**FC Basel**	Sion
19:30	Morgado 71'; Grgić 79'		Ajeti 82'; Zuffi 88' (pen.); Stocker 102', 120+2'	Stadium: Stade de Tourbillon; Attendance: 9,000; Referee: Stephan Klossner

28 February 2019	**FC Zurich**	**2–1**	SC Kriens	Zurich
20:15	Khelifi 16'; Winter 83'		Chihadeh 44'	Stadium: Letzigrund; Attendance: 3,650; Referee: Lionel Tschudi

28 February 2019	**FC Thun**	**3–2**	FC Lugano	Thun
19:30	Salanović 34'; Sutter 71'; Sorgić 82'		Čovilo 41'; Janko 90'	Stadium: Stockhorn Arena; Attendance: 3,102; Referee: Urs Schnyder

6 March 2019	**FC Luzern**	**4–0**	BSC Young Boys	Lucerne
18:00	Schürpf 6', 62'; Schneuwly 69'; Vargas 75'			Stadium: Swissporarena; Attendance: 8,110; Referee: Sandro Schärer

== Semi-finals ==
23 April 2019	FC Luzern	**0–1**	**FC Thun**	Lucerne
20:15			Gelmi 80'	Stadium: Swissporarena; Attendance: 12,094; Referee: Adrien Jaccottet

25 April 2019	FC Zürich	**1–3**	**FC Basel**	Zurich
20:15	Odey 90+4'		Okafor 5'; Kuzmanović 87'; Ajeti 90+2'	Stadium: Letzigrund; Attendance: 13,403; Referee: Stephan Klossner

== Final ==
19 May 2019
15:00

FC Basel	2–1	FC Thun
Okafor (yellow card) 13'; Ajeti 24' (yellow card) 90+4'; Álvarez (yellow card) 26'; Riveros (yellow card) 65'; Frei 77'; Omlin (yellow card) 87'	SFV summary Report	Stillhart (yellow card) 23'; Sorgić 81'; Costanzo (yellow card) 90+3'

Stade de Suisse Wankdorf Bern, Bern
Attendance: 20,500
Referee: Fedayi San

GK	(Switzerland) Jonas Omlin
DF	(Albania) Taulant Xhaka
DF	(Czech Republic) Marek Suchý (c)
DF	(Peru) Carlos Zambrano
MF	(Paraguay) Blás Riveros
MF	(Colombia) Éder Álvarez Balanta
MF	(Switzerland) Fabian Frei	(substituted off) 90+1'
MF	(Switzerland) Valentin Stocker	(substituted off) 67'
MF	(Switzerland) Luca Zuffi	(substituted off) 72'
ST	(Switzerland) Noah Okafor
ST	(Switzerland) Albian Ajeti
Substitutes:
MF	(Netherlands) Ricky van Wolfswinkel	(substituted on) 90+1'
MF	(Switzerland) Kevin Bua	(substituted on) 67'
FW	(Serbia) Zdravko Kuzmanović	(substituted on) 72'
Manager:
(Switzerland) Marcel Koller

GK	(Switzerland) Guillaume Faivre (c)
DF	(Switzerland) Sven Joss
DF	(Switzerland) Roy Gelmi
DF	(Switzerland) Nicola Sutter	(substituted off) 26'
DF	(Switzerland) Chris Kablan
MF	(Slovenia) Kenan Fatkič
MF	(Switzerland) Matteo Tosetti	(substituted off) 78'
MF	(Switzerland) Moreno Costanzo
MF	(Switzerland) Basil Stillhart
MF	(Switzerland) Marvin Spielmann	(substituted off) 90+4'
ST	(Serbia) Dejan Sorgić
Substitutes:
MF	(Switzerland) Gregory Karlen	(substituted on) 26'
MF	(Liechtenstein) Dennis Salanović	(substituted on) 76'
MF	(Switzerland) Dominik Schwizer	(substituted on) 90+4'
Manager:
(Switzerland) Marc Schneider
