= Lirik Vishi =

Swiss footballer (born 2001)

Personal information
- Date of birth: 13 June 2001 (age 25)
- Place of birth: Langenthal, Switzerland
- Height: 1.78 m (5 ft 10 in)
- Position: Midfielder

Youth career
- –2011: Solothurn
- 2012–2020: Basel

Senior career*
Years	Team	Apps	(Gls)
2019–2022	Basel U21	52	(13)
2020–2022	Basel	3	(0)
2022–2023	Yverdon	25	(5)
2023–2024	Bellinzona	15	(1)

International career^{‡}
2017	Switzerland U16	3	(1)
2020	Switzerland U20	1	(0)
- * Club domestic league appearances and goals as of 28 May 2024 ‡ National team caps and goals as of 7 October 2020

Lirik Vishi (born 13 June 2001) is a Swiss professional footballer who plays as a midfielder.

== Club career ==
Born in Langenthal, Vishi played his early football by local club Solothurn and moved to the youth section of FC Basel in January 2012. Since then he has passed through all the junior levels for his club. In the 2019–20 season he made a total of 13 appearances with the U21 team in the Swiss Promotion League, the third tier of the Swiss football league system. On 21 June 2020, Vishi made his debut for the club's first team coming on as a substitute in the second half, but the team was beaten 2–1 loss by FC Luzern.

On 1 July 2020, at the start of their 2020–21 season, the club announced that they had signed a two year professional contract with Vishi.

On 9 August 2022, Vishi moved to Yverdon on a two-year deal.

== Personal life ==
Vishi is of Kosovan descent.

== Career statistics ==
=== Club ===
As of 22 June 2020.

Club	Season	League			Cup		Continental		Other		Total	
Club	Season	Division	Apps	Goals	Apps	Goals	Apps	Goals	Apps	Goals	Apps	Goals
Basel U21	2019–20	Swiss Promotion League	14	1	–		–		0	0	14	1
Basel	2019–20	Swiss Super League	3	0	0	0	–		0	0	3	0
Basel	2020–21	Swiss Super League	0	0	0	0	–		0	0	0	0
Career total			17	1	0	0	0	0	0	0	17	1
