= Joël Geissmann =

Swiss footballer (born 1993)

Personal information
- Date of birth: 3 March 1993 (age 33)
- Place of birth: Hägglingen, Switzerland
- Height: 1.87 m (6 ft 2 in)
- Position: Midfielder

Youth career
- 2010–2014: FC Aarau
- 2011–2012: → Grasshoppers (loan)
- 2012–2014: → FC Baden (loan)

Senior career*
Years	Team	Apps	(Gls)
2013–2014	FC Aarau	0	(0)
2014	→ FC Wohlen (loan)	16	(2)
2014–2016	FC Wohlen	62	(10)
2016–2017	FC Thun	27	(5)
2017–2022	Lausanne-Sport	98	(12)

International career^{‡}
2009–2010	Switzerland U17	6	(1)
2010	Switzerland U18	6	(2)
2011	Switzerland U19	11	(1)
- * Club domestic league appearances and goals as of 18:53, 26 May 2022 (UTC) ‡ National team caps and goals as of 18:53, 26 May 2022 (UTC)

Joël Geissmann (born 3 March 1993) is a Swiss professional footballer who plays as a midfielder.

== Career ==
Geissman is a youth product of FC Aarau, with loan stints with the academies of Grasshoppers and FC Baden. He began his senior career with FC Wohlen, on loan from Aarau, before signing formally with Wohlen in 2014 where he became the vice-captain at FC Wohlen. He transferred to FC Thun in the summer of 2016. He transferred to Lausanne-Sport in the summer of 2017 signing a three-year contract, that was extended for 2 more years in 2020.

== International career ==
Geissman is a youth international for Switzerland, having represented them from U17 to U19 levels.
