= Kenan Fatkič =

Slovenian footballer

Personal information
- Date of birth: 20 August 1997 (age 29)
- Place of birth: Slovenj Gradec, Slovenia
- Height: 1.86 m (6 ft 1 in)
- Position: Midfielder

Team information
- Current team: Hansa Rostock
- Number: 4

Youth career
- Luzern

Senior career*
Years	Team	Apps	(Gls)
2017–2018	Chiasso	35	(2)
2018–2022	Thun	92	(8)
2022–2025	Neuchâtel Xamax	100	(11)
2025–	Hansa Rostock	34	(8)

International career^{‡}
2017–2018	Slovenia U21	6	(0)
- * Club domestic league appearances and goals as of 28 May 2026 ‡ National team caps and goals as of 14 October 2023

Kenan Fatkič (born 20 August 1997) is a Slovenian professional footballer who plays as a midfielder for German 3. Liga club Hansa Rostock.

== Career ==
Fatkič joined FC Thun on 11 June 2018 after a successful debut season with FC Chiasso in the Swiss Challenge League. Fatkič made his professional debut for Thun in a 2–1 Swiss Super League loss to FC Zürich on 22 July 2018.

On 18 May 2022, Fatkič signed a two-year contract with Neuchâtel Xamax.

On 27 May 2025, Fatkič agreed to move to Hansa Rostock in German 3. Liga for the 2025–26 season.
