= Marcel Koller =

Swiss football manager (born 1960)

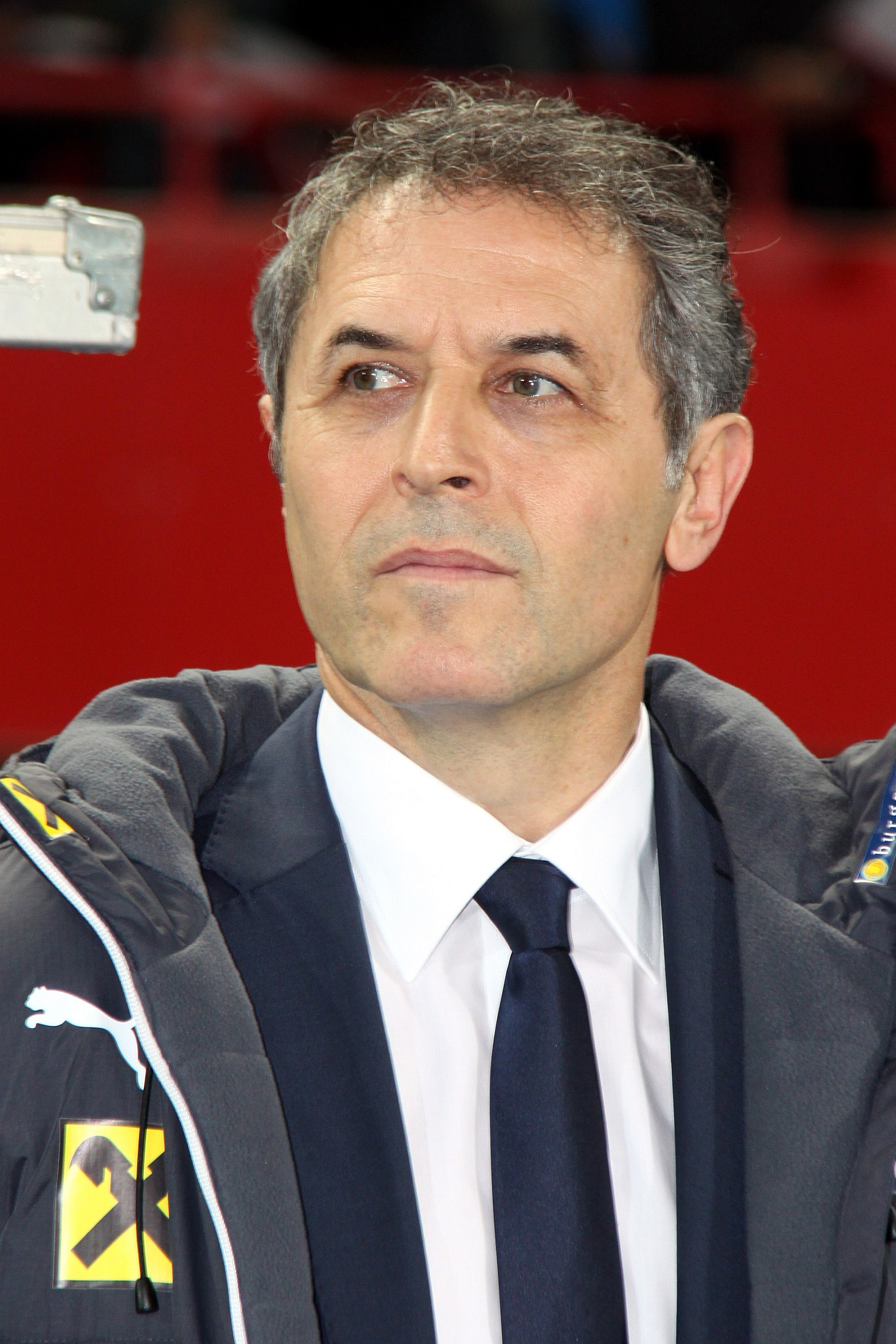
- Koller managing Austria in 2014

Personal information
- Full name: Marcel Martin Koller
- Date of birth: 11 November 1960 (age 66)
- Place of birth: Zürich, Switzerland
- Height: 1.73 m (5 ft 8 in)
- Position: Midfielder

Team information
- Current team: Zürich (manager)

Youth career
- 1970–1972: FC Schwamendingen
- 1972–1978: Grasshoppers

Senior career*
Years	Team	Apps	(Gls)
1978–1997	Grasshoppers	428	(59)

International career
1982–1996	Switzerland	57	(3)

Managerial career
- 1997–1998: FC Wil
- 1999–2002: St. Gallen
- 2002–2003: Grasshoppers
- 2003–2004: 1. FC Köln
- 2005–2009: VfL Bochum
- 2011–2017: Austria
- 2018–2020: Basel
- 2022–2025: Al Ahly
- 2026–: Zürich
- * Club domestic league appearances and goals

Marcel Martin Koller (born 11 November 1960) is a Swiss professional football manager and former player who is manager of Swiss Super League club Zürich.

== Playing career ==
Born in Zürich, Koller played his entire career for Swiss club Grasshoppers Zürich. In these 24 years he won seven Swiss championships and five Swiss cups. Koller was capped 56 times for the Swiss national team, scoring 3 goals. He was part of the Swiss squad at Euro 1996.

== Managerial career ==
=== Switzerland ===
Koller's career as coach started at the Swiss club FC Wil in the 1997–98 season. He led his club to a promotion place in the Swiss Challenge League. In January 1999 he went to FC St. Gallen in the Swiss Super League. One year later the club won its first championship for almost 100 years. Also on European level FC St. Gallen would celebrate successes: in the UEFA Cup the Swiss side would eliminate English top club FC Chelsea. Koller was voted Swiss manager of the year 2000.

On 9 January 2002, he went to his old love, Grasshoppers Zürich. Koller won his second championship as a coach in the 2003 Season. After failing to qualify for the Champions League (against AEK 1–0/1–3) and a losing streak in the league he resigned on 3 October 2003.

=== 1. FC Köln ===
The next step in his career was a move to German Bundesliga. Koller's first station in Germany was 1. FC Köln. However, this spell was not a very successful and took only seven months. Koller took the club in a desperate position and could not improve the results. In his term the club only won four matches and relegated eventually to 2. Bundesliga. During this period he gave young talents the opportunity to debut on the highest level. The most prominent example is German international Lukas Podolski. 1. FC Köln ended at last position. Koller was sacked after the season ended.

=== VfL Bochum ===
From 23 May 2005 on, Koller was the coach of German side VfL Bochum. The club was relegated into the Second Bundesliga the season before and its coach Peter Neururer was sacked as a result. Koller got the challenge to lead the club directly back to the highest level. Already five matches before the end of the season VfL Bochum was sure of its return to the Bundesliga.

The goal of season 2006–07 was to stay in the Bundesliga. VfL Bochum did not start very well and many supporters demanded the dismissal of the coach. But the board kept faith in the coach and Koller's contract was even extended in that difficult period. VfL Bochum bought a few new players in the winter break and started a winning streak. Highlights were two memorable home victories against arch rivals Borussia Dortmund (2–0) and FC Schalke 04. (2–1). Bochum even had a winning streak of four away victories in a row at the end of the season, a new club record. Already two rounds for the end of the season VfL Bochum was sure of survival in the Bundesliga. Eventually the club finished at the 8th place, the third best season for Bochum ever.

The VfL Bochum lost three important players in the summer break 2007 so that most observers were rather skeptical about the club in the coming season. But the club played a solid season and ended, without too much relegation troubles, in the midfield. However, at the beginning of the season 2008–09 Koller defined 45 points as target. Surprisingly Bochum did not have to sell key players and could even afford some relatively spectacular transfers. With the return of former key players Paul Freier and Vahid Hashemian, and the purchase of the talents Daniel Fernandes and Austrian international Christian Fuchs Koller called his team the best team he had at Bochum ever. Nevertheless, the club came into relegation troubles and could save itself rather late in the season. At the end Bochum finished 14th in that season. Again many supporters asked during the season for the dismissal of the coach. Especially the release of crowd pleaser Tomasz Zdebel in the winter break caused many frictions with the fans.

Due to the relatively poor results in the season before, Koller started under great pressure in the 2009–10 season. With only four points out of the first six matches VfL Bochum started again rather disappointing and the public pressure grew continuously. After a 2–3 home defeat by FSV Mainz more than two thousand supporters gathered at the stadium to demand his dismissal. As a reaction one day later, at 20 September 2009 Koller was sacked as head coach of VfL Bochum.

=== Austria national team ===
On 4 October 2011, Koller was appointed as the new manager of the Austria national team. Koller officially started on 1 November 2011. He was in charge of Austria when it reached the final phase of a European championship for the first time by the qualifying groups (the only previous participation at a final phase being in 2008 as co-hosts). In 2016 the national team reached its highest position ever (10th) in the FIFA World Rankings.

=== FC Basel ===
From August 2018 to August 2020, Koller was the head coach of FC Basel, where he won the 2018–19 Swiss Cup.

=== Al Ahly ===
On 9 September 2022, Koller signed a two-year contract with Egyptian club Al Ahly. On 28 October 2022, he won his first title with Al Ahly after beating Zamalek SC 2–0 in the 2021–22 Egyptian Super Cup at Hazza bin Zayed Stadium in Abu Dhabi, United Arab Emirates. On 10 April 2023, he won his second title after beating Pyramids FC 2–1 in the 2021–22 Egypt Cup final.

On May 5, 2023, he won his third title at the club by defeating Pyramids FC 1–0 in the Super Cup. Following this victory, he secured the African Champions League on June 11, with a 3–2 aggregate win against Wydad AC. A month later, on July 15, his club triumphed in the 2022–23 Egyptian Premier League, finishing the season with only one defeat. He then led the team to win the 2023–24 CAF Champions League against Espérance de Tunis, extending their record in the competition to 12 titles. In November 2024 he was linked with a managerial role at EFL Championship football club QPR leading to a deterioration in the relationship between Koller and the Al Ahly board.

On 26 April 2025, Koller was sacked following a 1–1 home draw against Mamelodi Sundowns in the African Champions League semi-finals, which led to the team's elimination on away goals.

=== FC Zürich ===
On 14 April 2026, he was announced as the new head coach of FC Zürich from the 2026–27 season onwards. He took over management of the club on 1 June 2026.

== Managerial record ==
As of match updated 22 November 2026

Team	From	To	Record							
Team	From	To	G	W	D	L	GF	GA	GD	Win %
FC Wil	1 July 1997	30 June 1998	41	15	16	10	63	49	+14	36.59
St. Gallen	1 January 1999	8 January 2002	129	59	34	36	230	170	+60	45.74
Grasshoppers	9 January 2002	2 October 2003	75	40	18	17	163	102	+61	53.33
1. FC Köln	2 November 2003	16 June 2004	24	4	5	15	24	40	−16	16.67
VfL Bochum	23 May 2005	20 September 2009	152	55	39	58	214	215	−1	36.18
Austria	1 November 2011	31 December 2017	54	25	13	16	81	58	+23	46.30
Basel	2 August 2018	31 August 2020	101	61	19	21	214	114	+100	60.40
Al Ahly	9 September 2022	26 April 2025	161	106	37	18	289	108	+181	65.84
FC Zürich	1 June 2026	present	16	7	4	5	29	31	−2	43.75
Total			753	372	185	196	1,307	887	+420	49.40

== Honours ==
=== Player ===
Grasshoppers

- Swiss Championship: 1981–82, 1982–83, 1983–84, 1989–90, 1990–91, 1994–95, 1995–96
- Swiss Cup: 1982–83, 1987–88, 1988–89, 1989–90, 1993–94
- Swiss Super Cup: 1989

=== Manager ===
St Gallen

- Swiss Championship: 1999–2000

Grasshoppers

- Swiss Championship: 2002–03

Vfl Bochum

- 2. Bundesliga: 2005–06

Basel

- Swiss Cup: 2018–19

Al Ahly

- Egyptian Premier League: 2022–23, 2023–24
- Egypt Cup: 2021–22, 2022–23
- Egyptian Super Cup: 2021–22, 2022–23, 2023–24, 2024–25
- CAF Champions League: 2022–23, 2023–24
