= 2018–19 FC Basel season =

FC Basel
2018–19 season
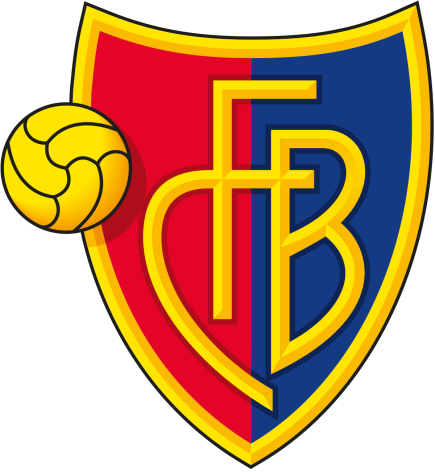
- Owner: FCB Holding
- Chairman: Bernhard Burgener
- Manager: Raphaël Wicky until 26 July 2018; A. Frei ad interim Marcel Koller from 2 August 2018
- Ground: St. Jakob-Park, Basel, Switzerland
- Super League: 2nd
- Swiss Cup: Winners
- Champions League: Second qualifying round
- Europa League: Play-off round
- Top goalscorer: League: Albian Ajeti (14); All: Albian Ajeti (21)
Home colours	Away colours

The 2018–19 FC Basel season is the 126th season in club history and the club's 24th consecutive season in the top flight of Swiss football. Basel were runners-up in the previous season. The season started on the weekend of 21–22 July 2018 and will end on Saturday 25 May 2019. The first round of the Swiss Cup was played on the week-end 29, 30 June and 1 July. Basel played the first round on Friday 29 June against lower classed FC Montlingen and they were victorious. Therefore Basel continued in the competition in the second round against FC Echallens.

Basel were also qualified for qualifying phase and play-offs (League Path). The draw for the second qualifying round was held on 19 June 2018 (after the completion of the first qualifying round draw). The first leg was played on 24 July and the second leg played on 1 August 2018. But Basel were eliminated by PAOK and they therefore continued in the Play-off round of the Europa League against Vitesse Arnhem.

== Club ==
=== Management ===
Raphaël Wicky was the first team manager at the start of the season. His assistant was Massimo Lombardo and a further member of the training staff was Werner Leuthard. Due to the very poor start into the season Wicky was sacked on 26 July, after the Champions League qualifying defeat against PAOK. Alexander Frei then took over as interim coach until a new manager was named. On 2 August Basel announced that Marcel Koller had signed as new manager. He appointed Thomas Janeschitz and Carlos Bernegger as his assistants. Massimo Colomba stayed as the Goalkeeper coach. Massimo Ceccaroni is head of the FCB Youth System.

Position	Staff
Manager	(Switzerland) Raphaël Wicky until 26 July 2018
Manager	(Switzerland) A. Frei (interim) from 26 July 2018 until 2 August 2018
Manager	(Switzerland) Marcel Koller from 2 August 2018
Assistant manager	(Switzerland) Massimo Lombardo until 2 August 2018
Assistant manager	(Austria) Thomas Janeschitz from 2 August 2018
Assistant manager	(Switzerland) Carlos Bernegger from 2 August 2018
Goalkeeper Coach	(Switzerland) Massimo Colomba
Fitness Coach	(Germany) Werner Leuthard until 2 August 2018
Team leader	(Switzerland) Gustav Nussbaumer
Youth Team Coach	(Switzerland) Arjan Peço
Youth Team Co-Coach	(Switzerland) Toni Membrino
Youth Team Co-Coach	(Switzerland) Michaël Bauch

Source: FCB Official Site

=== Further information ===
The FC Basel annual general meeting took place on 4 June 2018. The board of directors under president Bernhard Burgener with sportdirector Marco Streller, Peter von Büren, financial manager, Patrick Jost, marketing as well as Reto Baumgartner, Dominik Donzé and Benno Kaiser remained on the board. Roland Heri was voted onto the board as COO.

Chairman	(Switzerland) Bernhard Burgener
Sportdirector	(Switzerland) Marco Streller
COO	(Switzerland) Roland Heri
Finances	(Switzerland) Peter von Büren
Marketing	(Switzerland) Patrick Jost
Direktor	(Switzerland) Reto Baumgartner
Direktor	(Switzerland) Dominik Donzé
Direktor	(Switzerland) Benno Kaiser
Ground (capacity and dimensions)	St. Jakob-Park (38,512 (37,500 for international matches) / 120x80 m)

Updated to match played 4 June 2018
Source: FCB Official Site

== Overview ==
=== Offseason and preseason ===
Between the end of the 2017–18 FC Basel season and this season there were quite a few changes in the team squad. All three goalkeepers left the team. Tomáš Vaclík transferred to Sevilla, Mirko Salvi transferred to Grasshopper Club and Germano Vailati ended his active career. Furthermore, Mohamed Elyounoussi left the club and joined Southampton. Michael Lang also left the club and joined Borussia Mönchengladbach. Cedric Itten transferred to St. Gallen,

In the other direction Basel were not too busy on the transfer market. On 22 June 2018 Basel announced that they had signed goalkeeper Jonas Omlin from Luzern and on 26 June 2018 Basel announced that they had signed Aldo Kalulu from Lyon.

During the winter break, on 4 February 2019, the club announced that Edon Zhegrova had been signed in on loan for 18 months from Genk.

== The Campaign ==
=== Domestic League ===
The season started on the weekend of 21–22 July 2018. Basel's priority aim for the new season was to win the league championship.

=== Domestic Cup ===
Basel's clear aim for the cup this season was to win the title. The first round was played on the week-end 29, 30 June and 1 July. Basel played their first-round game on Friday 29 June away from home against lower classed FC Montlingen. In the first round Basel beat Montlingen 3–0, in the second round Echallens Région 7–2 and in the round of 16 Winterthur 1–0. In the quarter-finals Sion were defeated 4–2 after extra time and in the semi-finals Zürich 3–1. All these games were played away from home. The final was held on the 19 May 2019 in the Stade de Suisse Wankdorf Bern against Thun. Albian Ajeti scored the first goal, Fabian Frei the second for Basel, then Dejan Sorgić netted a goal for Thun, but the end result was 2–1 for Basel. Basel's aim for this competition was therefore fulfilled.

=== Champions League ===
Basel entered into this season's Champions League in the qualifying phase and play-offs (League Path). The draw for the second qualifying round was held on 19 June 2018 (after the completion of the first qualifying round draw). The first legs will be played on 24 and 25 July, and the second legs will be played on 31 July and 1 August 2018. Basel were matched against the greek team PAOK.

== Players ==
=== First team squad ===
The following is the list of the Basel first team squad. It also includes players that were in the squad the day the season started on 21 July 2018 but subsequently left the club after that date.

As of 5 August 2018

Note: Flags indicate national team as defined under FIFA eligibility rules; some limited exceptions apply. Players may hold more than one non-FIFA nationality.

No.	Pos.	Nation	Player
1	GK	SUI	Jonas Omlin
40	GK	ANG	Antonio Signori
35	GK	DEN	Martin Hansen
44	GK	GRE	Jozef Pukaj
3	DF	GRE	Konstantinos Dimitriou
4	DF	SUI	Eray Cömert
5	DF	SUI	Silvan Widmer
23	DF	COL	Éder Álvarez Balanta
25	DF	PER	Carlos Zambrano
28	DF	ITA	Raoul Petretta
15	DF	PAR	Blás Riveros
17	DF	CZE	Marek Suchý (Captain)
43	DF	SUI	Yves Kaiser
6	MF	SUI	Fabian Frei
7	MF	SUI	Luca Zuffi
8	MF	SRB	Zdravko Kuzmanović

No.	Pos.	Nation	Player
10	MF	SUI	Samuele Campo
11	MF	SUI	Noah Okafor
14	MF	SUI	Valentin Stocker
20	MF	CIV	Serey Dié
26	MF	FRA	Aldo Kalulu
27	MF	SUI	Neftali Manzambi
33	MF	SUI	Kevin Bua
30	MF	KOS	Edon Zhegrova
34	MF	ALB	Taulant Xhaka (Vice-Captain)
36	MF	SUI	Robin Huser
37	FW	FRA	Afimico Pululu
9	FW	NED	Ricky van Wolfswinkel
18	FW	SUI	Julian Von Moos
19	FW	SUI	Dimitri Oberlin
22	FW	SUI	Albian Ajeti

=== Transfers summer 2018 ===
==== In ====
4	DF	SUI	Eray Cümart (returned end of loan)
8	MF	SRB	Zdravko Kuzmanović (returned end of loan)
18	FW	SUI	Julian Von Moos (from Grasshopper Club)
21	GK	SUI	Jonas Omlin (from Luzern)
25	DF	PER	Carlos Zambrano (on loan from Dynamo Kyiv)
26	MF	FRA	Aldo Kalulu (from Lyon)

==== Out ====
1	GK	CZE	Tomáš Vaclík (to Sevilla)
5	DF	SUI	Michael Lang (to Borussia Mönchengladbach)
13	GK	SUI	Mirko Salvi (to Grasshopper Club)
15	MF	SWE	Alexander Fransson (to IFK Norrköping)
18	GK	SUI	Germano Vailati (end of career)
20	MF	CIV	Serey Dié (on loan to Neuchâtel Xamax until 30 June 2019)
24	MF	NOR	Mohamed Elyounoussi (to Southampton)
30	MF	SUI	Cedric Itten (to St. Gallen)
35	DF	POR	Pedro Pacheco (to)
39	MF	SUI	Davide Callà (to Winterthur)
-	MF	SUI	Dereck Kutesa (to St. Gallen)
-	MF	SUI	Dominik Schmid (on loan at FC Wil until 30 June 2019)

=== Transfers winter break 2018 ===
==== In ====
30	MF	KOS	Edon Zhegrova (on loan from Genk)

== Results and fixtures ==
Kickoff times are in CET.

=== Legend ===
Win Draw Loss Postponed

=== Friendly matches ===
==== Preseason ====
22 June 2018 Pre-season	Basel	6–1	Rapperswil-Jona	Youth-Campus, Basel
16:00	Okafor 4'; Campo 6'; Al. Ajeti 23'; Stocker 33'; Pululu 63'; Oberlin 70'	Report	3' Turkes	Attendance: 350; Referee: (Switzerland) Pascal Erlachner

10 July 2018 Uhrencup	FC Basel	1–2	Wolverhampton Wanderers	Tissot Arena, Biel/Bienne
18:00	van Wolfswinkel (yellow card) 22' (goal) 9'; Suchý (yellow card) 18'; Kuzmanović (yellow card) 80'	Report	17' Rafa; (yellow card) 32' Watt; 50' Jota	Attendance: 1,700; Referee: (Switzerland) Urs Schnyder

13 July 2018 Uhrencup	FC Basel	0–5	Feyenoord	Tissot Arena, Biel/Bienne
20:00	Dié (yellow card) 48'; Zuffi (yellow card) 66'; Ajeti (yellow card) 71'	Report	van Persie 2', 61'; Berghuis 45'; Botteghin 71'; Vilhena 79'

==== Winter break ====
11 January 2019 Test	Basel	2–0	Aarau	Youth-Campus, Basel
15:00	van Wolfswinkel 57'; Oberlin 74'	Report		Attendance: 500; Referee: (Switzerland) Lukas Fähndrich

17 January 2019 Test	Basel	2–1	Puskás Akadémia	Marbella Football Center, San Pedro de Alcántara
16:30	Al. Ajeti 9'; F. Frei 86'	Report	89' Latifi	Attendance: 60; Referee: (Spain) José Antonio Gutierrez Pérez

22 January 2019 Test	Basel	2–0	FK Krasnodar	Marbella Football Center, San Pedro de Alcántara
13:00	Bua 50'; Balanta 66'	Report	(yellow card) 35' Da Silva; (yellow card) 35' Kaboré	Attendance: 120; Referee: (Spain) Pablo Pla Muñoz

26 January 2019 Test	Union Berlin	2–2	Basel	An der Alten Försterei
14:00	Polter 21'; Prömel 30'	Report	4' Kalulu; 41' van Wolfswinkel	Attendance: 2'406; Referee: (Germany) Lasse Koslowski

=== Swiss Super League ===
==== First half of season ====
21 July 2018 Round 1	Basel	1–2	St. Gallen	St. Jakob-Park, Basel
19:00	Ajeti (yellow card) 44'; Quintillà 66' (o.g.); Kalulu (yellow card) 69'; Serey Dié (yellow card) 90+3'	Report	(yellow card) 20' Quintillà; (yellow card) 38' Vilotić; (yellow card) 49' Tschernegg; 56' Itten; (yellow card) 65' Kutesa; 90+4' Sierro	Attendance: 25,648; Referee: (Switzerland) Fedayi San (Gebenstorf)

28 July 2018 Round 2	Xamax	1–1	Basel	Stade de la Maladière, Neuchâtel
19:00	Xhemajli (yellow card) 34'; Nuzzolo 85'	Report	66' Okafor; (yellow card) 78' (yellow-red card) 90' Campo	Attendance: 12,000; Referee: (Switzerland) Nikolaj Hänni (Gams SG)

4 August 2018 Round 3	Basel	4–2	Grasshopper Club	St. Jakob Stadium, Basel
19:00	Zuffi 8'; F. Frei 40'; Cümart (yellow card) 29' (yellow-red card) 62'; Al. Ajeti 64' van Wolfswinkel 68'; Bua (yellow card) 90+1'	Report	72' Bahoui; (yellow card) 77' Pusic; (penalty missed) 83′ Sigurjónsson; 87' Djuricin; (penalty missed) 90+2′ Djuricin	Attendance: 25,313; Referee: (Switzerland) Sandro Schärer (Buttikon)

12 August 2018 Round 4	Basel	3–2	Sion	St. Jakob Stadium, Basel
19:00	Al. Ajeti 1'; F. Frei 28'; Widmer (yellow card) 39'; Neitzke 71' (o.g.)	Report	(yellow card) 39' Maceiras; 40', 56' Uldriķis; (yellow card) 45' Neitzke	Attendance: 25,078; Referee: (Switzerland) Fedayi San (Gebenstorf)

26 August 2018 Round 5	Zürich	1–1	Basel	Letzigrund, Zürich
16:00	Nef (yellow card) 39'; Pa Modou Jagne 76'; Rüegg (yellow card) 78'	Report	39' (yellow card) 75' Campo; (yellow card) 70' F. Frei; (yellow card) 87' van Wolfswinkel	Attendance: 13,126; Referee: (Switzerland) Alain Bieri (Solothurn)

2 September 2018 Round 6	Basel	1–1	Thun	St. Jakob-Park, Basel
16:00	Xhaka (yellow card) 19' (yellow-red card) 45'; F. Frei 45'; Balanta (yellow card) 77'	Report	29' (yellow card) 79' Sorgić; (yellow card) 34' Glarner; (yellow card) 36' Tosetti; (yellow card) 47' Sutter; (yellow card) 74' Karlen	Attendance: 26,117; Referee: (Switzerland) Lionel Tschudi (Neuchâtel)

23 September 2018 Round 7	Young Boys	7–1	Basel	Stade de Suisse, Bern
16:00	Fassnacht 30'; Sulejmani 41'; Sanogo (yellow card) 47'; Camara 52'; Hoarau (yellow card) 58' (goal) 60'; Aebischer 70'; Bertone 80' (yellow card) 90'; Assalé 89'	Report	(yellow card) 50' (goal) 75' van Wolfswinkel; (red card) 62' Balanta; (yellow card) 66' Ajeti	Attendance: 31,120; Referee: (Switzerland) Fedayi San (Gebenstorf)

26 September 2018 Round 8	Basel	2–1	Luzern	St. Jakob-Park, Basel
20:00	Cömert (yellow card) 13'; Bua 33' (yellow card) 86'; Riveros (yellow card) 73'; Serey Dié 80'; F. Frei (yellow card) 89'	Report	(yellow card) 33' Vargas; (yellow card) 74' Salvi; 90' (pen.) Eleke	Attendance: 23,570; Referee: (Switzerland) Urs Schnyder

30 September 2018 Round 9	Lugano	2–2	Basel	Cornaredo, Lugano
16:00	Čovilo (yellow card) 19' (goal) 52'; Vécsei (yellow card) 39'; Sabbatini (yellow card) 78'; Carlinhos Junior 82'; Gerndt (yellow card) 90+1'	Report	9' Zuffi; 50' Ajeti	Attendance: 4,364; Referee: (Switzerland) Pascal Erlachner

6 October 2018 Round 10	St. Gallen	1–3	Basel	Kybunpark, St. Gallen
19:00	Sierro 31'; Barnetta (yellow card) 63'; Quintillà (yellow card) 72'	Report	(yellow card) 13' Serey Die; 37' Al. Ajeti; 81' Zuffi; 84' Riveros; (yellow card) 88' Hansen; (yellow card) 90' Kalulu; (yellow card) 93' Widmer	Attendance: 14,503; Referee: (Greece) Ioannis Papadopoulos

21 October 2018 Round 11	Basel	1–1	Xamax	St. Jakob-Park, Basel
16:00	Al. Ajeti 40'; F. Frei (yellow card) 42'	FCB Report	52' Nuzzolo; (yellow card) 58' Doudin; (yellow card) 74' Kamber; (yellow card) 79' Di Nardo; (yellow card) 86' Pickel; (yellow card) 88' Walthert	Attendance: 24,605; Referee: (Switzerland) Nikolaj Hänni (Gams SG)

27 October 2018 Round 12	Grasshopper Club	1–3	Basel	Letzigrund, Zürich
19:00	Doumbia (yellow card) 14'; Holzhauser (yellow card) 22'; Jeffrén (yellow card) 34'; Cvetković (yellow card) 66'; Zesiger (yellow card) 82'; Rhyner 86'	FCB Report	6' Zuffi; 11' Balanta; 17' (yellow card) 46' van Wolfswinkel	Attendance: 6,900; Referee: (Switzerland) Alain Bieri (Solothurn)

5 November 2018 Round 13	Basel	3–2	Lugano	St. Jakob-Park, Basel
16:00	Xhaka (yellow card) 4'; Bua (yellow card) 66' (goal) 11', 34' van Wolfswinkel 84'; Widmer (yellow card) 88'	FCB report	51' (o.g.) van Wolfswinkel; 72' Sabbatini	Attendance: 23,835; Referee: (Switzerland) Fedayi San (Gebenstorf)

10 November 2018 Round 14	Thun	4–2	Basel	Stockhorn Arena, Thun
19:00	Spielmann (penalty missed) 25′ Glarner (yellow card) 39'; Stillhart 45+1'; Sorgić 55' (pen.), 78'; Hediger (yellow card) 65'; Tosetti 70'; Salanović (yellow card) 82'	FCB report	20' van Wolfswinkel; 28' Al. Ajeti; (yellow card) 50' F. Frei; (yellow card) 89' Xhaka; (yellow card) 90+2' Pululu	Attendance: 7,144; Referee: (Switzerland) Stephan Klossner

25 November 2018 Round 15	Luzern	1–1	Basel	Swissporarena, Luzern
16:00	Schürpf 7'; Schwegler (yellow card) 27'; Sidler (yellow card) 58'; Schneuwly (yellow card) 90'	FCB report	(yellow card) 25' van Wolfswinkel; (yellow card) 37' Xhaka; (yellow card) 58' Al. Ajeti; (yellow card) 72' Balanta; 90' (yellow card) 51' Cömert	Attendance: 10,702; Referee: (Switzerland) Alain Bieri (Solothurn)

2 December 2018 Round 16	Basel	1–3	Young Boys	St. Jakob-Park, Basel
16:00	Al. Ajeti 16'; Balanta (yellow card) 26'; Xhaka (yellow card) 70'; Cömert (yellow card) 89'; F. Frei (yellow card) 90+2'	FCB report	(yellow card) 28' Aebischer; (yellow card) 36' Mbabu; 69' Camara; 79' Sulejmani; 89' Fassnacht	Attendance: 29,491; Referee: (Switzerland) Fedayi San (Gebenstorf)

9 December 2018 Round 17	Basel	2–0	Zürich	St. Jakob-Park, Basel
16:00	Al. Ajeti 19'; Okafor (yellow card) 40'; Petretta 48'; Oberlin (yellow card) 79'	FCB report	(yellow card) 44' Pálsson; (yellow card) 84' Kasai	Attendance: 26,760; Referee: (Switzerland) Nikolaj Hänni (Gams SG)

15 December 2018 Round 18	Sion	1–2	Basel	Stade Tourbillon, Sion
19:00	Adryan 31'; Kouassi (yellow card) 44'; Neitzke (yellow card) 59'; Abdellaoui (yellow card) 73'; Fickentscher (yellow card) 82'	FCB report	46' (yellow card) van Wolfswinkel; (yellow card) 72' Kuzmanović; 82' Widmer	Attendance: 10,200; Referee: (Switzerland) Urs Schnyder

==== Second half of season ====
3 February 2019 Round 19	Grasshopper Club	0–4	Basel	Letzigrund, Zürich
16:00	Ar. Ajeti (yellow card) 3' (yellow-red card) 26'	FCB report	19', 36', 73' van Wolfswinkel; (yellow card) 41' Bua; (yellow card) 52' F. Frei; 76' Al. Ajeti	Attendance: 5,200; Referee: (Switzerland) Stephan Klossner

9 February 2019 Round 20	Basel	1–1	St. Gallen	St. Jakob-Park, Basel
19:00	Xhaka (yellow card) 7'; F. Frei (yellow card) 19'; Zambrano (yellow card) 66'; Campo (yellow card) 89' (goal) 90+2'	FCB report	(yellow card) 35' Ashimeru; (yellow card) 47' Quintillà; (yellow card) 53' Kutesa; (yellow card) 70' Nuhu; 86' Bakayoko; (yellow card) 90' Tafer	Attendance: 27,543; Referee: (Switzerland) Urs Schnyder

17 February 2019 Round 21	Basel	1–0	Sion	St. Jakob-Park, Basel
16:00	Zuffi 43' (pen.); Kuzmanović (yellow card) 90'	Report	(yellow card) 42' Fickentscher; (yellow card) 76' Toma; (yellow card) 83' Neitzke	Attendance: 21,339; Referee: (Switzerland) Alain Bieri (Solothurn)

23 February 2019 Round 22	Xamax	0–2	Basel	Stade de la Maladière, Neuchâtel
19:00	Serey Die (red card) 68'; Pickel (yellow card) 68'	Report	35' Stocker; (yellow card) 58' Suchý; 70' Okafor	Attendance: 6,121; Referee: (Switzerland) Alessandro Dudic

3 March 2019 Round 23	Basel	3–1	Thun	St. Jakob-Park, Basel
16:00	van Wolfswinkel 16'; Al. Ajeti 32'; Okafor (yellow card) 35'; Balanta (yellow card) 37'; Zuffi 83'; F. Frei (yellow card) 89'	Report	89' Rodrigues	Attendance: 21,717; Referee: (Switzerland) Lukas Fähndrich

10 March 2019 Round 24	Lugano	1–1	Basel	Cornaredo, Lugano
16:00	Sabbatini 44'; Črnigoj (yellow card) 77'	Report	7' Al. Ajeti; (yellow card) 52' Stocker; (yellow card) 86' Petretta	Attendance: 4,188; Referee: (Switzerland) Fedayi San (Gebenstorf)

17 March 2019 Round 25	Basel	2–2	Young Boys	St. Jakob-Park, Basel
16:00	Aebischer 17' (o.g.); Suchý (yellow card) 38'; Okafor (yellow card) 35' (goal) 53'; Widmer (yellow card) 83'	Report	(yellow card) 32' Aebischer; 41', 44' (yellow card) 49' Nsame; (yellow card) 86' Camara	Attendance: 28,103; Referee: (Switzerland) Sandro Schärer (Buttikon)

30 March 2019 Round 26	Luzern	0–1	Basel	Swissporarena, Luzern
19:00	Ćirković (yellow card) 83'	Report	(yellow card) 47' Kuzmanović; 80' Suchý; (yellow card) 90' Kalulu	Attendance: 11,549; Referee: (Switzerland) Nikolaj Hänni (Gams SG)

4 April 2019 Round 27	Zürich	0–2	Basel	Letzigrund, Zürich
20:00	Rüegg (yellow card) 28'; H. Kryeziu (yellow card) 35'; Maxsø (yellow card) 74'	Report	54' (yellow card) 60' Campo; 89' Al. Ajeti	Attendance: 10,324; Referee: (Switzerland) Stephan Klossner

7 April 2019 Round 28	Basel	1–1	Lugano	St. Jakob-Park, Basel
16:00	Črnigoj (yellow card) 58'; Sadiku (yellow card) 81' (goal) 67'	Report	(yellow card) 24' Xhaka; (yellow card) 41' Cömert; 75' Suchý; (yellow card) 93' Balanta	Attendance: 21,533; Referee: (Switzerland) Urs Schnyder

13 April 2019 Round 29	Basel	0–0	Grasshopper Club	St. Jakob-Park, Basel
19:00	Zesiger (yellow card) 52'	Report	(yellow card) 78' Al. Ajeti	Attendance: 22,004; Referee: (Switzerland) Sandro Schärer (Buttikon)

19 April 2019 Round 30	Sion	0–3	Basel	Stade Tourbillon, Sion
20:00	Grgić (yellow card) 67'; Baltazar (yellow card) 81'; Zock (yellow card) 48' (yellow-red card) 84'	Report	32' (yellow card) 42' van Wolfswinkel; 85' (pen.) Zuffi; 90+2' Grgić	Attendance: 12,800; Referee: (Switzerland) Urs Schnyder

28 April 2019 Round 31	St. Gallen	0–3	Basel	Kybunpark, St. Gallen
16:00	Vilotić (yellow card) 79'	Report	21' van Wolfswinkel; 65' Campo; 82' Stocker	Attendance: 13,755; Referee: (Switzerland) Pascal Erlachner

4 May 2019 Round 32	Basel	3–0	Zürich	St. Jakob-Park, Basel
19:00	Zambrano 49' van Wolfswinkel 66'; Balanta (yellow card) 86'; Ajeti 90+1'	Report	(yellow card) 42' Odey	Attendance: 23,099; Referee: (Switzerland) Lionel Tschudi

12 May 2019 Round 33	Young Boys	3–1	Basel	Stade de Suisse, Bern
16:00	von Bergen (yellow card) 27'; Benito (yellow card) 54'; Nsame 62'; Mbabu (yellow card) 80'; Ngamaleu 81', 90+1'	Report	4' Frei; (yellow card) 42' (yellow-red card) 72' Zambrano; (yellow card) 56' Stocker	Attendance: 31,120; Referee: (Switzerland) Urs Schnyder

15 May 2019 Round 34	Basel	3–2	Luzern	St. Jakob-Park, Basel
20:00	Kuzmanović 18' (pen.); Balanta 37'; Al. Ajeti 47'; (yellow card) 68' Petretta; (yellow card) 88' Zhegrova	Report	51' Demhasaj; 55' Demhasaj; (yellow card) 57' Sidler; (yellow card) 67' Kakabadze; (yellow card) 74' Voca	Attendance: 20,631; Referee: (Switzerland) Lukas Fähndrich

22 May 2019 Round 35	Thun	1–2	Basel	Stockhorn Arena, Thun
20:00	Costanzo 75'	Report	(yellow card) 47' Kuzmanović; 62' Campo; (yellow card) 69' Cömert; (yellow card) 77' Al. Ajeti; 88' Bua	Attendance: 5,151; Referee: (Switzerland) Stephan Klossner

25 May 2019 Round 36	Basel	4–1	Xamax	St. Jakob-Park, Basel
19:00	Okafor (yellow card) 28'; Campo 26', 56'; Riveros 78' von Moos 90'	Report	89' Ademi	Attendance: 21,275; Referee: (Switzerland) Urs Schnyder

==== League standings ====
Pos	Team	Pld	W	D	L	GF	GA	GD	Pts	Qualification or relegation
1	Young Boys (C)	36	29	4	3	99	36	+63	91	Qualification for the Champions League play-off round
2	Basel	36	20	11	5	71	46	+25	71	Qualification for the Champions League second qualifying round
3	Lugano	36	10	16	10	50	49	+1	46	Qualification for the Europa League group stage
4	Thun	36	12	10	14	57	58	−1	46	Qualification for the Europa League third qualifying round
5	Luzern	36	14	4	18	56	61	−5	46	Qualification for the Europa League second qualifying round
6	St. Gallen	36	13	7	16	49	58	−9	46	
7	Zürich	36	11	11	14	43	52	−9	44	
8	Sion	36	12	7	17	50	55	−5	43	
9	Xamax (O)	36	9	10	17	44	65	−21	37	Qualification for the relegation play-offs
10	Grasshopper (R)	36	5	10	21	32	71	−39	25	Relegation to the Swiss Challenge League

Source: Swiss Super League
Rules for classification: 1) Points; 2) Goal difference; 3) Goals scored; 4) Head-to-head goal difference; 5) Away goals scored; 6) Draw.
(C) Champions; (O) Play-off winners; (R) Relegated

=== Swiss Cup ===
The draw for the first round was held in June 2018. The Super League and Challenge League clubs were seeded and could not be drawn against each other. The lower division teams were granted home advantage and Basel were therefore drawn away. The home advantage was also granted to the team from the lower league in the second and third rounds.

18 August 2018 Round 1	FC Montlingen	0–3	Basel	Sportanlage – Kolbenstein, Montlingen
		Report	10' Balanta; 66' Bua; 84' Kalulu	Attendance: 4,348; Referee: (Switzerland) Nikolaj Hänni (Gams SG)

15 September 2018 Round 2	Echallens Région	2–7	Basel	Sportplatz 3 Sapins, Echallens
16:00	Adam (yellow card) 37'; El Allaoui 55'; Galokho 90+1'	FCB Report	52', 53' (yellow card) 61' Al. Ajeti; 63' van Wolfswinkel; 65' Bua; 69' Campo; 80' Oberlin; 85' F. Frei	Attendance: 4,087; Referee: (Switzerland) Stephan Klossner

31 October 2018 Round of 16	Winterthur	0–1	Basel	Stadion Schützenwiese, Echallens
20:00	Hajrović (yellow card) 83'	Summary	Widmer 53'; Xhaka (yellow card) 61'	Attendance: 8,400; Referee: Sandro Schärer

27 February 2019 Quarter-finals	Sion	2–4 (a.e.t.)	Basel	Stade Tourbillon, Sion
20:30	Adryan (yellow card) 53'; André (yellow card) 59'; Morgado 70'; Grgić 78'; Ndoye (yellow card) 115'	Summary	Ajeti 82'; Petretta (yellow card) 85'; Zuffi 88' (pen.) (yellow card) 117'; Stocker 101' (yellow card) 103' (goal) 120+3'; Álvarez (yellow card) 105+1'; Xhaka (yellow card) 112'	Attendance: 9,000; Referee: Stephan Klossner

25 April 2019 Semi-finals	Zürich	1–3	Basel	Letzigrund, Zürich
20:15	Odey (yellow card) 82' (goal) 90+4'; Kasaï (yellow card) 90'	Report	Okafor 5'; Suchý (yellow card) 21' van Wolfswinkel (yellow card) 44'; Petretta (yellow card) 45'; Kuzmanović (yellow card) 81' (goal) 87'; Ajeti 90+2'	Attendance: 13,400; Referee: (Switzerland) Stephan Klossner

19 May 2019 Final	Basel	2–1	Thun	Bern
15:00	Okafor (yellow card) 13'; Ajeti 24' (yellow card) 90+4'; Álvarez (yellow card) 26'; Riveros (yellow card) 65'; Frei 77'; Omlin (yellow card) 87'	Report	Stillhart (yellow card) 23'; Sorgić 81'; Costanzo (yellow card) 90+3'	Stadium: Stade de Suisse Wankdorf Bern; Attendance: 20,500; Referee: Fedayi San

=== UEFA Champions League ===
==== Qualifying phase ====
Basel were qualified for the 2018–19 UEFA Champions League in the qualifying phase (League Path) in the second qualifying round. The draw for this round was held on 19 June 2018.

24 July 2018 1st Leg	PAOK (Greece)	2–1	(Switzerland) Basel	Toumba Stadium, Thessaloniki
19:30 (20:30 EEST)	Cañas 32'; Prijović 80'	Report	Dié (yellow card) 32'; Stocker (yellow card) 69'; Frei (yellow card) 75'; Ajeti 82'	Attendance: 24,670; Referee: Bobby Madley (England)

1 August 2018 Return Leg	Basel (Switzerland)	0–3 (1–5 agg.)	(Greece) PAOK	St. Jakob-Park, Basel
20:00	Zuffi (yellow card) 33'; Dié (yellow card) 44'; Suchy (yellow card) 63'	Report	Varela 7'; Prijović (yellow card) 16' (goal) 52'; Matos (yellow card) 48'; El Kaddouri 60'; Pelkas (yellow card) 77'	Attendance: 14,328; Referee: Paolo Valeri (Italy)

=== UEFA Europa League ===
==== Third qualifying round ====
Following their elimination in the UEFA Champions League qualifying phase, Basel were qualified for the Europa League third qualifying round.

9 August 2018 1st Leg	Vitesse (Netherlands)	0–1	(Switzerland) Basel	GelreDome, Arnhem
20:00	Karavayev (yellow card) 65'; Gong (yellow card) 73'; Van der Werff (yellow card) 83'	Report	Van Wolfswinkel (yellow card) 60', (goal) 90+3'; Widmer (yellow card) 83'	Attendance: 11,532; Referee: Georgi Kabakov (Bulgaria)

16 August 2018 Return Leg	Basel (Switzerland)	1–0 (2–0 agg.)	(Netherlands) Vitesse	St. Jakob-Park, Basel
20:00	Ajeti 30'; Petretta (yellow card) 78'	Report	Clarke-Salter (red card) 26'	Attendance: 12,334; Referee: Daniel Siebert (Germany)

==== Play-off round ====
23 August 2018 1st Leg	Basel (Switzerland)	3–2	(Cyprus) Apollon Limassol	St. Jakob-Park, Basel
20:00	van Wolfswinkel 6', 69' (yellow card) 45'; Cömert 84'; Xhaka (yellow card) 90'	UEFA Report; FCB Report	Maglica 49'; Papoulis 53' (yellow card) 54'; Kyriakou (yellow card) 74'; Zelaya (yellow card) 90'	Attendance: 10,743; Referee: Matej Jug (Slovenia)

30 August 2018 Return Leg	Apollon Limassol (Cyprus)	1–0 (3a – 3 agg.)	(Switzerland) Basel	GSP Stadium, Nicosia (Note: Apollon Limassol played their home matches at GSP Stadium, Nicosia, instead of their regular stadium Tsirio Stadium, Limassol.)
19:00 (20:00 EEST)	Kyriakou 53' (yellow card) 87'; Vasiliou (yellow card) 57'; Maglica (yellow card) 89'; Vale (yellow card) 90+3'	UEFA Report; FCB Report	Ajeti (yellow card) 51'; Pululu (yellow card) 90'	Attendance: 4,005; Referee: Ruddy Buquet (France)

== See also ==
- History of FC Basel
- List of FC Basel players
- List of FC Basel seasons

== Sources ==
- Die ersten 125 Jahre / 2018. Publisher: Josef Zindel im Friedrich Reinhardt Verlag, Basel. ISBN 978-3-7245-2305-5
- Season 2018–19 at "Basler Fussballarchiv” homepage
- Switzerland 2018–19 at RSSSF
