= 2019–20 Swiss Super League =

123rd season of top-tier Swiss football

Swiss Super League
- Season: 2019–20
- Dates: 19 July 2019 – 3 August 2020
- Champions: Young Boys; 14th title
- Relegated: Neuchâtel Xamax; Thun
- Champions League: Young Boys
- Europa League: St. Gallen; Basel; Servette
- Matches played: 180
- Goals scored: 541 (3.01 per match)
- Top goalscorer: Jean-Pierre Nsame (32 goals)
- Biggest home win: Young Boys 6–0 Xamax; St. Gallen 6–0 Xamax
- Biggest away win: Zürich 0–5 Servette; Zürich 0–5 Young Boys; St. Gallen 0–5 Basel
- Highest scoring: Basel 4–4 Lugano

The 2019–20 Swiss Super League (referred to as the Raiffeisen Super League for sponsoring reasons) was the 123rd season of top-tier competitive football in Switzerland and the 17th under its current name and format.

A total of 10 teams competed in the league: the 9 best teams from the 2018–19 season and the 2018–19 Swiss Challenge League champions Servette. Young Boys were the defending champions. They successfully retained the title.

On 28 February Swiss Football League postponed all Super and Challenge League matches of matchdays 24, 25 and 26. Postponement came after the Swiss Federal Council banned all major events until 15 March due to the COVID-19 outbreak. On 13 March Super and Challenge League football was halted at least until the end of April; however, the season was resumed on 19 June.

== Teams ==
=== Stadia and locations ===
Location of the 2019–20 Swiss Super League teams

Club	Location	Stadium	Capacity
Basel	Basel	St. Jakob-Park	37,994
Lugano	Lugano	Stadio Cornaredo	6,390
Luzern	Lucerne	Swissporarena	16,490
Neuchâtel Xamax	Neuchâtel	Stade de la Maladière	11,997
Servette	Geneva	Stade de Genève	30,084
Sion	Sion	Stade Tourbillon	14,283
St. Gallen	St. Gallen	Kybunpark	19,456
Thun	Thun	Stockhorn Arena	10,014
Young Boys	Bern	Stade de Suisse	31,789
Zürich	Zürich	Letzigrund	26,104

=== Personnel and kits ===
Team	Manager	Captain	Kit manufacturer	Shirt sponsor
Basel	(Switzerland) Marcel Koller	(Switzerland) Valentin Stocker	Adidas	Novartis
Lugano	(Switzerland) Maurizio Jacobacci	(Uruguay) Jonathan Sabbatini	Acerbis	AIL
Luzern	(Switzerland) Fabio Celestini	(Switzerland) Christian Schneuwly	Craft	Otto’s
Neuchâtel Xamax	(Switzerland) Stéphane Henchoz	(Switzerland) Laurent Walthert	Erima	Groupe E, Banque cantonale neuchâteloise
Servette	(Switzerland) Alain Geiger	(Switzerland) Anthony Sauthier	Puma	Balexert
Sion	(Italy) Paolo Tramezzani	(Ivory Coast) Xavier Kouassi	Macron	Capital Markets Consulting
St. Gallen	(Germany) Peter Zeidler	(Switzerland) Silvan Hefti	Jako	St.Galler Kantonalbank
Thun	(Switzerland) Marc Schneider	(Switzerland) Dennis Hediger	Macron	Panorama Center, Schneider Software AG
Young Boys	(Switzerland) Gerardo Seoane	(Switzerland) Fabian Lustenberger	Nike	Obi
Zürich	(Switzerland) Ludovic Magnin	(Switzerland) Yanick Brecher	Nike	AntePay

=== Managerial changes ===
Team	Outgoing manager	Manner of departure	Date of departure	Position in table	Incoming manager	Date of appointment
Neuchâtel Xamax	(Switzerland) Stéphane Henchoz	End of contract	1 July 2019	Pre-season	(Switzerland) Joël Magnin	1 July 2019
Sion	(Switzerland) Christian Zermatten	End of interim	1 July 2019	Pre-season	(Switzerland) Stéphane Henchoz	1 July 2019
Lugano	(Switzerland) Fabio Celestini	Sacked	29 October 2019	9th	(Switzerland) Maurizio Jacobacci	29 October 2019
Sion	(Switzerland) Stéphane Henchoz	Resigned	4 November 2019	5th	(Switzerland) Christian Zermatten (caretaker)	4 November 2019
Luzern	(Switzerland) Thomas Häberli	Sacked	16 December 2019	8th	(Switzerland) Fabio Celestini	2 January 2020
Sion	(Switzerland) Christian Zermatten	End of interim	1 January 2020	8th	(Portugal) Ricardo Dionisio (caretaker)	1 January 2020
Sion	(Portugal) Ricardo Dionisio	End of interim	1 June 2020	8th	(Italy) Paolo Tramezzani	4 June 2020
Neuchâtel Xamax	(Switzerland) Joël Magnin	Sacked	5 July 2020	10th	(Switzerland) Stéphane Henchoz	5 July 2020

== League table ==
Pos	Team	Pld	W	D	L	GF	GA	GD	Pts	Qualification or relegation
1	Young Boys (C)	36	23	7	6	80	41	+39	76	Qualificaition for Champions League second qualifying round
2	St. Gallen	36	21	5	10	79	56	+23	68	Qualificaition for Europa League third qualifying round
3	Basel	36	18	8	10	74	38	+36	62	Qualificaition for Europa League second qualifying round
4	Servette	36	12	13	11	57	48	+9	49	Qualificaition for Europa League first qualifying round
5	Lugano	36	11	14	11	46	46	0	47	
6	Luzern	36	13	7	16	42	50	−8	46	
7	Zürich	36	12	7	17	45	72	−27	43	
8	Sion	36	10	9	17	40	55	−15	39	
9	Thun (R)	36	10	8	18	45	67	−22	38	Qualificaition for relegation play-offs
10	Neuchâtel Xamax (R)	36	5	12	19	33	68	−35	27	Relegation to Swiss Challenge League

Source: Swiss Super League
Rules for classification: 1) Points; 2) Goal difference; 3) Goals scored; 4) Head-to-head goal difference; 5) Away goals scored; 6) Draw.
(C) Champions; (R) Relegated

== Results ==
=== First and second round ===
Home \ Away	BAS	LUG	LUZ	SER	SIO	StG	THU	XAM	YB	ZUR
Basel	—	2–1	3–0	3–1	4–0	1–2	3–1	1–1	3–0	4–0
Lugano	0–3	—	1–1	1–0	0–1	1–3	0–0	0–1	0–0	0–0
Luzern	2–1	1–2	—	1–2	3–1	1–4	0–2	1–0	2–2	0–0
Servette	2–0	0–0	1–0	—	0–0	1–2	2–1	2–2	3–0	0–1
Sion	1–4	1–2	2–1	1–1	—	1–2	2–1	1–1	3–4	3–1
St. Gallen	0–0	3–2	0–2	3–1	3–0	—	4–0	4–1	2–3	1–3
Thun	2–3	0–3	0–2	0–4	0–1	1–4	—	2–2	1–1	0–1
Xamax	0–3	1–1	2–0	2–2	1–3	1–1	2–3	—	0–1	0–1
Young Boys	1–1	2–0	1–0	1–1	3–2	4–3	4–2	4–1	—	4–0
Zürich	3–2	0–4	3–0	0–5	4–2	2–1	2–0	2–2	0–4	—

Legend: Blue = home team win; Yellow = draw; Red = away team win.

=== Third and fourth round ===
Home \ Away	BAS	LUG	LUZ	SER	SIO	StG	THU	XAM	YB	ZUR
Basel	—	4–4	0–0	2–2	2–0	1–2	0–1	2–0	3–2	4–0
Lugano	2–1	—	2–0	3–1	0–0	3–3	1–1	1–1	2–1	1–0
Luzern	2–1	3–3	—	2–2	1–2	1–0	3–0	1–2	2–0	2–1
Servette	2–2	1–1	2–0	—	1–2	1–1	2–0	4–1	1–1	4–1
Sion	1–0	1–1	0–2	1–1	—	1–2	1–1	1–2	0–1	1–1
St. Gallen	0–5	3–1	4–1	1–0	2–1	—	3–2	6–0	3–3	0–4
Thun	0–0	3–2	1–1	5–1	2–1	2–1	—	3–0	1–0	3–2
Xamax	1–2	0–1	0–1	1–2	0–0	1–2	2–1	—	0–1	1–1
Young Boys	2–0	3–0	1–0	4–2	1–0	3–1	4–0	6–0	—	3–2
Zürich	0–4	1–0	2–3	2–0	0–2	1–3	3–3	1–1	0–5	—

Legend: Blue = home team win; Yellow = draw; Red = away team win.

== Relegation play-offs ==
The ninth-placed team of 2019–20 Swiss Super League, Thun, played against the runners-up of 2019–20 Swiss Challenge League, Vaduz.

=== First leg ===
7 August 2020
18:15

Vaduz	2–0	Thun
Cicek 45+3'; Sutter 58'	Report

Rheinpark Stadion, Vaduz
Referee: Alain Bieri

=== Second leg ===
10 August 2020
18:15

Thun	4–3	Vaduz
Stillhart 41'; Bertone 47'; Munsy 87'; Rapp 90+4'	Report	Coulibaly 19, 51'; Cicek 69'

Stockhorn Arena, Thun
Referee: Adrien Jaccottet

Vaduz won 5–4 on aggregate and promoted to the Swiss Super League.

== Season statistics ==
=== Top scorers ===
Rank	Player	Club	Goals
1	(Cameroon) Jean-Pierre Nsame	Young Boys	32
2	(Switzerland) Cedric Itten	St. Gallen	19
3	(Brazil) Arthur	Basel	14
3	(Bosnia and Herzegovina) Ermedin Demirović	St. Gallen	14
5	(Germany) Kemal Ademi	Basel	13
5	(Switzerland) Raphaël Nuzzolo	Neuchâtel Xamax	13
5	(Spain) Jordi Quintillà	St. Gallen	13
8	(Switzerland) Ridge Munsy	Thun	12
9	(Switzerland) Pajtim Kasami	Sion	11
9	(Ivory Coast) Koro Koné	Servette	11
9	(Italy) Francesco Margiotta	Luzern	11

=== Hat-tricks ===
Player	For	Against	Result	Date
(Cameroon) Jean-Pierre Nsame	Young Boys	Sion	4–3 (A)	24 November 2019
(Switzerland) Pajtim Kasami	Sion	Young Boys	3–4 (H)	24 November 2019
(South Korea) Park Jung-bin	Servette	Zürich	5–0 (A)	8 December 2019
(Switzerland) Fabian Frei	Basel	Zürich	4–0 (A)	8 February 2020
(Ivory Coast) Koro Koné	Servette	Zürich	4–1 (H)	16 February 2020
(Cameroon) Jean-Pierre Nsame	Young Boys	Zürich	3–2 (H)	19 June 2020
(Cameroon) Jean-Pierre Nsame	Young Boys	Zürich	5–0 (A)	18 July 2020
(Switzerland) Cedric Itten	St. Gallen	Neuchâtel Xamax	6–0 (H)	31 July 2020

== Awards ==
=== Annual awards ===
Award	Winner	Club
Player of the Season	(Cameroon) Jean-Pierre Nsame	Young Boys
Young Player of the Season	(Switzerland) Noah Okafor	Basel
Coach of the Season	(Switzerland) Gerardo Seoane	Young Boys
Goal of the Season	(Switzerland) Steve von Bergen	Young Boys

Team of the Year
Goalkeeper	(Switzerland) Jonas Omlin (Basel)			
Defence	(Switzerland) Silvan Widmer (Basel)	(Switzerland) Eray Cömert (Basel)	(Paraguay) Omar Alderete (Basel)	(Switzerland) Ulisses Garcia (Young Boys)
Midfield	(Switzerland) Christian Fassnacht (Young Boys)	(Switzerland) Michel Aebischer (Young Boys)	(Spain) Jordi Quintillà (St.Gallen)	(Cameroon) Nicolas Ngamaleu (Young Boys)
Attack	(Cameroon) Jean-Pierre Nsame (Young Boys)		(Switzerland) Cedric Itten(St.Gallen)	
