= 2018–19 Swiss Super League =

122nd season of top-tier Swiss football

Swiss Super League
- Season: 2018–19
- Dates: 21 July 2018 – 25 May 2019
- Champions: Young Boys; 13th title
- Relegated: Grasshopper
- Champions League: Young Boys; Basel
- Europa League: Lugano; Thun; Luzern
- Matches: 90
- Goals: 310 (3.44 per match)
- Top goalscorer: Guillaume Hoarau (24)
- Biggest home win: Young Boys 7–1 Basel
- Biggest away win: Xamax 1–5 Thun
- Highest scoring: Young Boys 7–1 Basel
- Longest winning run: Young Boys (9 games)
- Longest unbeaten run: Young Boys (9 games)
- Longest winless run: Xamax (6 games)
- Longest losing run: Sion; Xamax (5 games each)
- Highest attendance: 31,120; Young Boys 7–1 Basel (23 September 2018)
- Total attendance: 593,387
- Average attendance: 11,868

The 2018–19 Swiss Super League (referred to as the Raiffeisen Super League for sponsoring reasons) was the 122nd season of top-tier competitive football in Switzerland and the 16th under its current name and format.

A total of 10 teams competed in the league: the 9 best teams from the 2017–18 season and the 2017–18 Swiss Challenge League champion Xamax. The season started on the weekend of 21–22 July 2018 and concluded on 25 May 2019 with a break between 17 December 2018 and 2 February 2019.

In May 2018, the Swiss Football League voted in favor of reintroducing the relegation play-offs, starting from the 2018–19 season. At the end of the season, the 9th-placed team of the Swiss Super League will face the 2nd-placed team of the Swiss Challenge League in a two-legged play-off to determine which of the two will compete in the Super League the following season.

== Teams ==
=== Stadia and locations ===
Location of the 2018–19 Swiss Super League teams

Club	Location	Stadium	Capacity
Basel	Basel	St. Jakob-Park	37,994
Grasshopper	Zürich	Letzigrund	26,104
Xamax	Neuchâtel	Stade de la Maladière	11,997
Lugano	Lugano	Stadio Cornaredo	6,390
Luzern	Lucerne	Swissporarena	16,490
Sion	Sion	Stade Tourbillon	14,283
St. Gallen	St. Gallen	kybunpark	19,456
Thun	Thun	Stockhorn Arena	10,014
Young Boys	Bern	Stade de Suisse	31,789
Zürich	Zürich	Letzigrund	26,104

=== Personnel and kits ===
Team	Manager	Captain	Kit manufacturer	Shirt sponsor
Basel	(Switzerland) Marcel Koller	(Czech Republic) Marek Suchý	Adidas	Novartis
Grasshopper	(Switzerland) Uli Forte	(Iceland) Rúnar Már Sigurjónsson	Puma	Fromm
Lugano	(Switzerland) Fabio Celestini	(Uruguay) Jonathan Sabbatini	Acerbis	AIL
Luzern	(Switzerland) René Weiler	(Switzerland) Claudio Lustenberger	Adidas	Otto’s
Sion	(Switzerland) Murat Yakin	(Switzerland) Kevin Fickentscher	Macron	Capital Markets Consulting
St. Gallen	(Germany) Peter Zeidler	(Switzerland) Silvan Hefti	Jako	St.Galler Kantonalbank
Thun	(Switzerland) Marc Schneider	(Switzerland) Dennis Hediger	Nike	Panorama Center, Schneider Software AG
Xamax	(Switzerland) Michel Decastel	(Switzerland) Laurent Walthert	Erima	Groupe E, Banque cantonale neuchâteloise
Young Boys	(Switzerland) Gerardo Seoane	(Switzerland) Steve von Bergen	Nike	Obi
Zürich	(Switzerland) Ludovic Magnin	(Iceland) Victor Pálsson	Nike	

=== Managerial changes ===
Team	Outgoing manager	Manner of departure	Date of departure	Position in table	Incoming manager	Date of appointment
St. Gallen	(Croatia) Boro Kuzmanović	End of interim	15 May 2018	Pre-season	(Germany) Peter Zeidler	15 May 2018
Young Boys	(Austria) Adi Hütter	Signed by Eintracht Frankfurt	16 May 2018	Pre-season	(Switzerland) Gerardo Seoane	1 June 2018
Luzern	(Switzerland) Gerardo Seoane	Signed by Young Boys	1 June 2018	Pre-season	(Switzerland) René Weiler	21 June 2018
Basel	(Switzerland) Raphaël Wicky	Sacked	26 July 2018	6th	(Switzerland) Alex Frei (interim)	26 July 2018
Basel	(Switzerland) Alex Frei	End of interim	2 August 2018	8th	(Switzerland) Marcel Koller	2 August 2018
Sion	(Switzerland) Maurizio Jacobacci	Sacked	14 September 2018	8th	(Switzerland) Murat Yakin	17 September 2018
Lugano	(Spain) Guillermo Abascal	Sacked	1 October 2018	6th	(Switzerland) Fabio Celestini	2 October 2018
Luzern	(Switzerland) René Weiler	Sacked	17 February 2019	7th	(Switzerland) Thomas Häberli	21 February 2019
Grasshopper	(Germany) Thorsten Fink	Sacked	4 March 2019	10th	(Croatia) Tomislav Stipić	6 March 2019
Grasshopper	(Croatia) Tomislav Stipić	Sacked	8 April 2019	10th	(Switzerland) Uli Forte	8 April 2019

== League table ==
Pos	Team	Pld	W	D	L	GF	GA	GD	Pts	Qualification or relegation
1	Young Boys (C)	36	29	4	3	99	36	+63	91	Qualification for the Champions League play-off round
2	Basel	36	20	11	5	71	46	+25	71	Qualification for the Champions League second qualifying round
3	Lugano	36	10	16	10	50	49	+1	46	Qualification for the Europa League group stage
4	Thun	36	12	10	14	57	58	−1	46	Qualification for the Europa League third qualifying round
5	Luzern	36	14	4	18	56	61	−5	46	Qualification for the Europa League second qualifying round
6	St. Gallen	36	13	7	16	49	58	−9	46	
7	Zürich	36	11	11	14	43	52	−9	44	
8	Sion	36	12	7	17	50	55	−5	43	
9	Xamax (O)	36	9	10	17	44	65	−21	37	Qualification for the relegation play-offs
10	Grasshopper (R)	36	5	10	21	32	71	−39	25	Relegation to Swiss Challenge League

Source: Swiss Super League
Rules for classification: 1) Points; 2) Goal difference; 3) Goals scored; 4) Head-to-head goal difference; 5) Away goals scored; 6) Draw.
(C) Champions; (O) Play-off winners; (R) Relegated

== Results ==
=== First and second round ===
Home \ Away	BAS	GRA	LUG	LUZ	SIO	StG	THU	XAM	YB	ZUR
Basel	—	4–2	3–2	2–1	3–2	1–2	1–1	1–1	1–3	2–0
Grasshopper	1–3	—	2–1	2–3	2–1	2–1	0–2	3–1	0–3	0–2
Lugano	2–2	2–2	—	1–4	2–2	3–1	2–1	2–2	0–2	1–0
Luzern	1–1	2–1	4–2	—	1–3	2–1	0–2	0–2	2–3	2–5
Sion	1–2	0–0	1–2	2–0	—	0–1	2–1	3–0	0–3	1–2
St. Gallen	1–3	2–1	2–2	0–1	2–4	—	3–2	3–2	2–3	3–2
Thun	4–2	1–0	1–1	2–1	4–1	2–0	—	2–2	1–4	2–2
Xamax	1–1	2–3	2–1	1–2	1–1	2–3	1–5	—	1–4	3–3
Young Boys	7–1	2–0	1–0	2–3	3–2	2–0	3–2	5–2	—	4–0
Zürich	1–1	2–0	0–0	1–0	1–2	0–0	2–1	0–0	3–3	—

Source: Swiss Super League (in German)
Legend: Blue = home team win; Yellow = draw; Red = away team win.

=== Third and fourth round ===
Home \ Away	BAS	GRA	LUG	LUZ	SIO	StG	THU	XAM	YB	ZUR
Basel	—	0–0	1–1	3–2	1–0	1–1	3–1	4–1	2–2	3–0
Grasshopper	0–4	—	1–1	1–3	0–3	0–1	1–1	0–1	0–1	1–1
Lugano	1–1	3–3	—	1–0	1–1	1–0	1–3	0–0	0–1	3–0
Luzern	0–1	4–0	0–3	—	1–3	3–0	3–1	0–1	1–3	3–0
Sion	0–3	3–0	2–2	2–2	—	2–2	0–1	1–0	0–4	1–0
St. Gallen	0–3	0–0	0–2	1–2	2–1	—	1–3	3–0	4–1	3–1
Thun	1–2	1–1	1–0	1–1	1–2	0–0	—	0–2	1–1	2–2
Xamax	0–2	1–1	1–1	2–1	3–1	0–1	3–2	—	1–0	1–2
Young Boys	3–1	6–1	2–2	4–0	1–0	3–2	5–1	2–0	—	2–0
Zürich	0–2	3–1	0–1	1–1	1–0	1–1	3–0	2–1	0–1	—

Source: Swiss Super League (in German)
Legend: Blue = home team win; Yellow = draw; Red = away team win.

== Relegation play-offs ==
Ninth placed Xamax faced Aarau, the runner-up of 2018–19 Swiss Challenge League.

=== First leg ===
30 May 2019
20:00

Xamax	0–4	Aarau
	Report	Maierhofer 22'; Taşar 34', 69'; Mišić 45+2'

Stade de la Maladière, Neuchâtel
Attendance: 12,000
Referee: Stephan Klossner

=== Second leg ===
2 June 2019
17:00

Aarau	0–4 (a.e.t.)	Xamax
	Report	Dié 20'; Ošs 29'; Ademi 38'; Tréand 72'
Penalties
Zverotić (penalty missed); Jäckle (penalty scored); Bürgy (penalty scored); Mišić (penalty scored); Karanović (penalty scored)	4–5	(penalty scored) Veloso; (penalty scored) Tréand; (penalty scored) Corbaz; (penalty scored) Ademi; (penalty scored) Dié

Stadion Brügglifeld, Aarau
Attendance: 7,526
Referee: Adrien Jaccottet

Neuchâtel Xamax won on penalties after drawing 4–4 on aggregate and will stay in the Swiss Super League.

== Attendances ==
Pos	Team	Total	High	Low	Average	Change
1	Young Boys	378,948	31,120	20,238	25,263	+15.0%
2	Basel	371,656	29,491	20,717	24,777	−4.2%
3	St. Gallen	201,326	18,790	9,824	12,583	−0.2%
4	Zürich	171,145	16,372	7,769	10,697	−0.3%
5	Luzern	148,462	13,626	7,298	9,279	−7.7%
6	Sion	134,600	12,800	7,000	8,973	−9.6%
7	Grasshopper	96,000	16,400	3,500	6,000	−14.5%
8	Thun	87,678	9,021	4,129	5,845	−1.1%
9	Xamax	92,410	12,000	3,004	5,776	+66.2%^{1}
10	Lugano	49,950	4,364	2,049	3,330	−11.1%
	League total	1,732,175	31,120	2,049	11,175	−0.1%

Updated to games played on 28 April 2019
Source: www.sfl.ch
Notes:
1: Played last season in Challenge League.

== Season Statistics ==
=== Top scorers ===
As of matches played on 14 April 2019.

Rank	Player	Club	Goals
1	(France) Guillaume Hoarau	Young Boys	18
2	(Switzerland) Dejan Sorgic	Thun	15
2	(Cameroon) Jean-Pierre Nsame	Young Boys	15
3	(Switzerland) Raphaël Nuzzolo	Xamax	13
4	(Switzerland) Albian Ajeti	Basel	12
6	(Netherlands) Ricky van Wolfswinkel	Basel	10
6	(Nigeria) Blessing Eleke	Luzern	10
6	(Switzerland) Vincent Sierro	FC St. Gallen	10
6	(Switzerland) Marvin Spielmann	Thun	10
10	(Brazil) Carlinhos	Lugano	9
10	(Switzerland) Christian Fassnacht	Young Boys	9
10	(Kosovo) Benjamin Kololli	FC Zurich	9

=== Hat-tricks ===
Player	For	Against	Result	Date
(France) Guillaume Hoarau	Young Boys	FC St. Gallen	3–1 (A)	31 March 2019

== Awards ==
=== Annual awards ===
Award	Winner	Club
Player of the Season	(Switzerland) Kevin Mbabu	Young Boys
Young Player of the Season	(Switzerland) Djibril Sow	Young Boys
Coach of the Season	(Switzerland) Gerardo Seoane	Young Boys\ Lucerne
Goal of the Season	(France) Guillaume Hoarau	Young Boys

Team of the Year
Goalkeeper	(Switzerland) Jonas Omlin (Basel)			
Defence	(Switzerland) Kevin Mbabu (Basel)	(Switzerland) Kevin Rüegg (Zurich)	(Switzerland) Steve von Bergen (Young Boys)	(Switzerland) Loris Benito (Young Boys)
Midfield	(Switzerland) Benjamin Kololli (Lausanne/Zurich)	(Ivory Coast) Sekou Sanogo (Young Boys)	(Switzerland) Djibril Sow (Young Boys)	(Serbia) Miralem Sulejmani (Young Boys)
Attack	(France) Guillaume Hoarau (Young Boys)		(Switzerland) Dejan Sorgic (Thun)	
