= Noah Okafor =

Swiss footballer (born 2000)

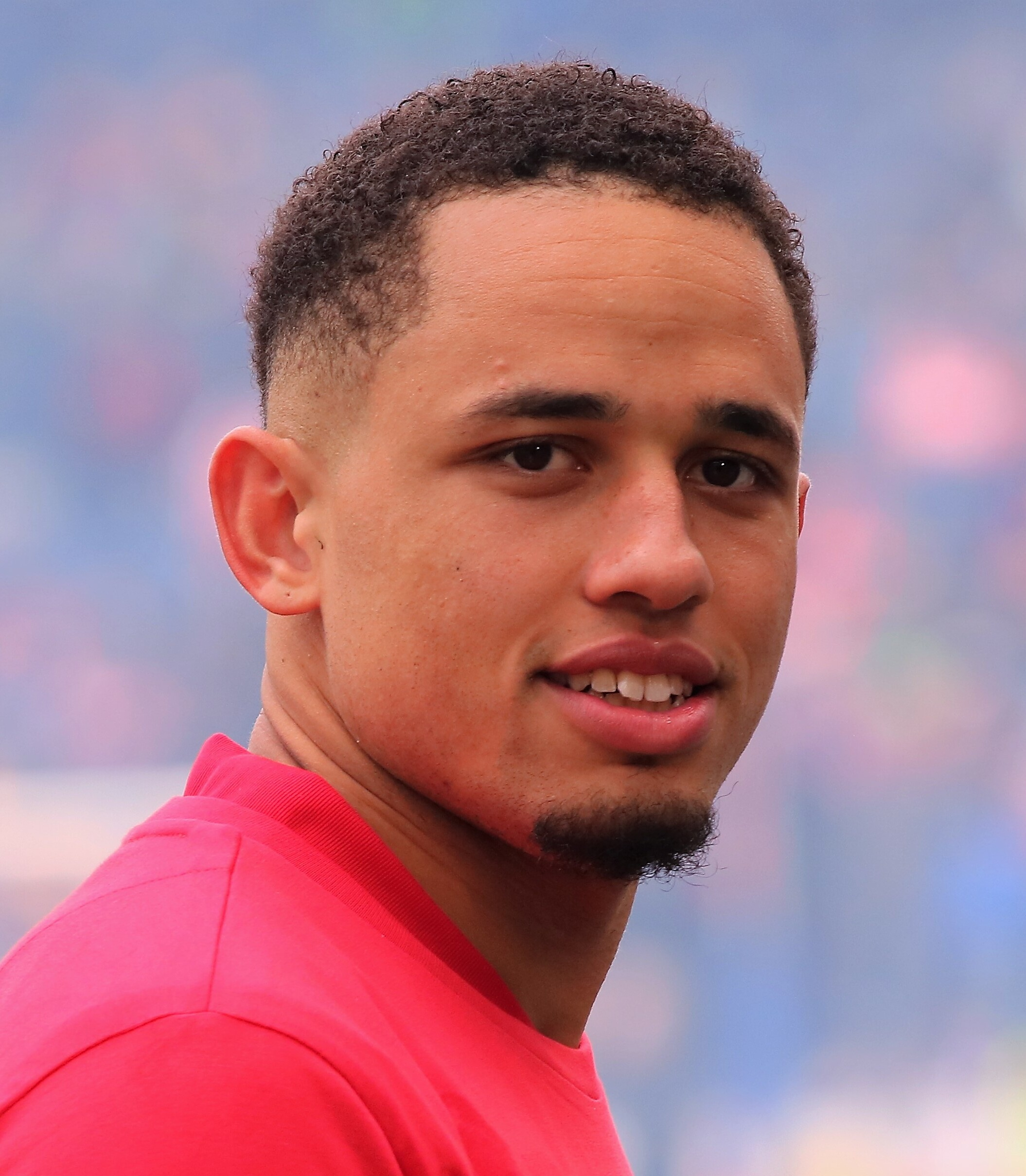
- Okafor with Red Bull Salzburg in 2022

Personal information
- Full name: Noah Arinzechukwu Okafor
- Date of birth: 24 May 2000 (age 26)
- Place of birth: Binningen, Switzerland
- Height: 1.85 m (6 ft 1 in)
- Positions: Forward; left winger

Team information
- Current team: Leeds United
- Number: 19

Youth career
- 2008–2009: FC Arisdorf
- 2009–2018: Basel

Senior career*
Years	Team	Apps	(Gls)
2018–2020	Basel	39	(3)
2020–2023	Red Bull Salzburg	71	(25)
2023–2025	AC Milan	39	(7)
2025	→ Napoli (loan)	4	(0)
2025–	Leeds United	38	(12)

International career
2014–2015	Switzerland U15	3	(0)
2016–2017	Switzerland U17	7	(3)
2017–2018	Switzerland U18	1	(0)
2018–2019	Switzerland U19	7	(1)
2019–2026	Switzerland	26	(2)
- * Club domestic league appearances and goals as of 18:21, 21 November 2026 (UTC)

Noah Arinzechukwu Okafor (born 24 May 2000) is a Swiss professional footballer who plays as a forward or left winger for Premier League club Leeds United.

== Club career ==
=== Basel ===
Okafor played his first youth football with local team FC Arisdorf. In 2009 he moved to the youth of Basel and continued through all the stages of their youth academy. He advanced to their first team during their 2018–19 season and on 31 January 2018, Okafor signed his first professional contract with his club under head coach Raphaël Wicky. He played his debut for their first team on 19 May 2018 in the home game against FC Luzern. The trainer substituted him in for the injured Mohamed Elyounoussi in the 34th minute and the game ended in a 2–2 draw. He scored his first goal for his club in the second round of the 2018–19 season on 28 July 2018 in the 1–1 away draw against Xamax.

Under trainer Marcel Koller Basel won the Swiss Cup in the 2018–19 season. In the first round Basel beat FC Montlingen 3–0, in the second round Echallens Région 7–2 and in the round of 16 Winterthur 1–0. In the quarter-finals Sion were defeated 4–2 after extra time and in the semi-finals Zürich were defeated 3–1. All these games were played away from home. The final was held on 19 May 2019 in the Stade de Suisse Wankdorf Bern against Thun. Striker Albian Ajeti scored the first goal, Fabian Frei the second for Basel, then Dejan Sorgić netted a goal for Thun, but the result was 2–1 for Basel. Okafor played in four cup games and scored a goal in the semi-final against Zürich.

Between the years 2017 and 2020 Okafor played a total of 72 games for Basel scoring a total of nine goals. 39 of these games were in the Swiss Super League, seven in the Swiss Cup, eight in the UEFA competitions (Champions League and Europa League) and 18 were friendly games. He scored three goals in the domestic league, two in the cup, two in the European competitions and the other two were scored during the test games.

=== Red Bull Salzburg ===
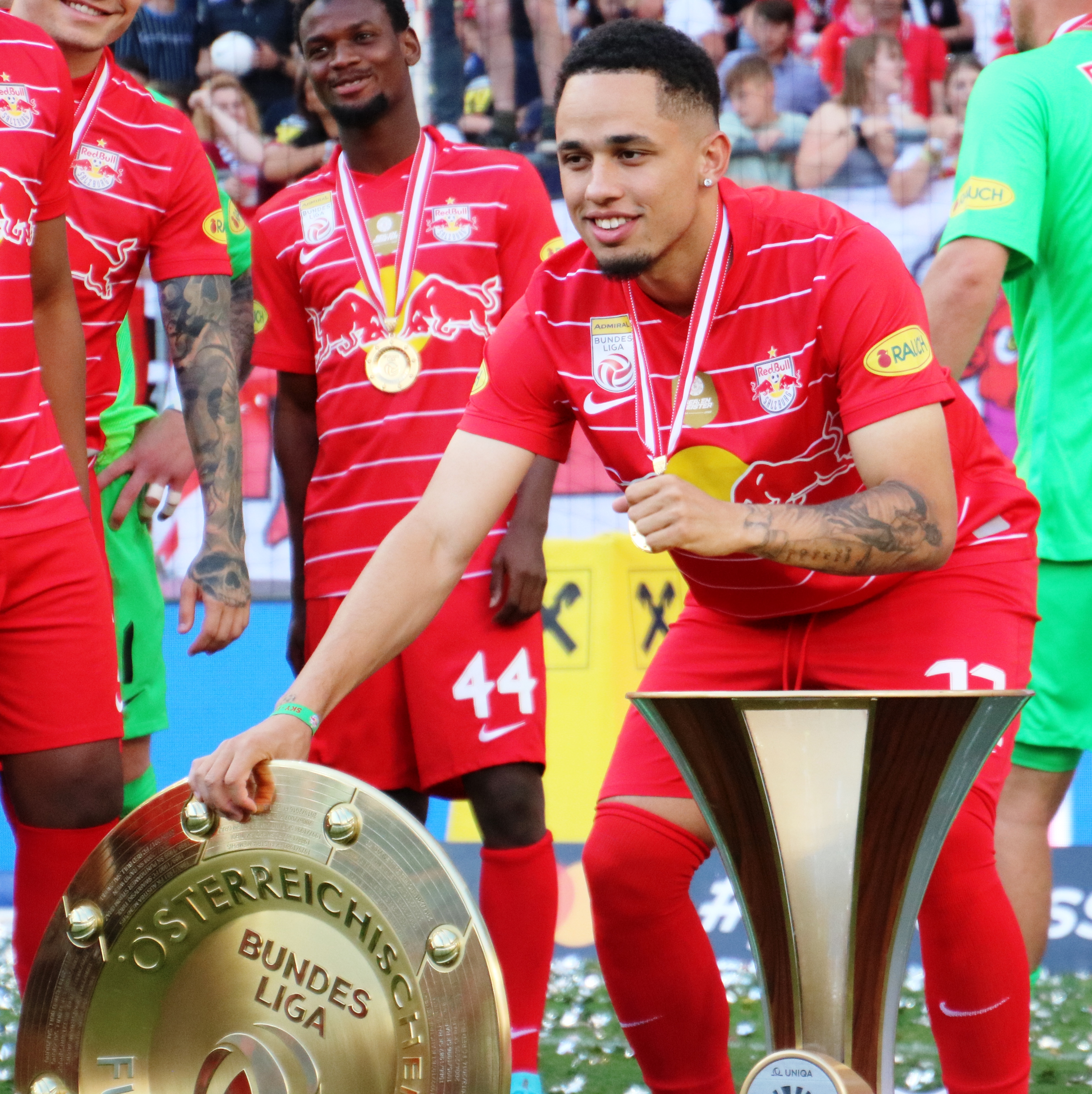
Okafor with Red Bull Salzburg in 2022

On 31 January 2020, Okafor signed for Red Bull Salzburg.

On 8 December 2021, Okafor scored the only goal of the game as Salzburg defeated Sevilla in the final group stage match of the Champions League. The win meant Salzburg secured progression to the Round of 16 and became the first-ever Austrian club to qualify for the knockout stages of the Champions League.

On 11 September 2022, during a Champions League group stage match against AC Milan, Okafor scored an impressive goal, leading the match to a 1–1 draw. After outmaneuvering Milan's defender Pierre Kalulu and goalkeeper Mike Maignan with a 'gurkerl' trick shot, his goal landed in the bottom right corner of the net, sparking widespread celebrations in the stadium.

=== AC Milan ===
On 22 July 2023, Okafor signed for Italian Serie A side AC Milan until 30 June 2028. Okafor made his Serie A debut for Milan on 21 August against Bologna. On 27 September, Okafor scored his first goal for the Rossoneri in a 3–1 away victory against Cagliari. Three days later, he scored the second goal against Lazio in 2–0 win. His third goal of the season came on 17 December against Monza, when he scored his team's third goal in a comfortable 3–0 win. On 20 January 2024, he came off the bench to score a stoppage-time winner against Udinese, it was the first win for AC Milan in the former's stadium since 2020.

On 17 August 2024, Okafor netted his first goal of the 2024–25 season in the opening match, which ended in a 2–2 draw against Torino. In January 2025, his loan move to Bundesliga club RB Leipzig was canceled after he failed a medical examination due to a muscular injury.

==== Loan to Napoli ====
On 3 February 2025, Okafor joined Serie A club Napoli on loan until the end of the 2024–25 season, with an option of a permanent transfer. On 23 May, Okafor won his first trophy in Italy, the fourth Scudetto in Napoli's history. His presence in the squad was thought to be unnecessary as he only featured in four matches under coach Antonio Conte.

=== Leeds United ===
On 19 August 2025, it was reported that an agreement had been reached for Okafor to sign for English Premier League club Leeds United. On 21 August, Okafor officially joined the club on a four-year contract in a deal reported to be £18,000,000. He scored his first goal for the club on 20 September, scoring Leeds' third goal in a 3–1 away win at Wolverhampton Wanderers.

On 13 April 2026, he netted his first brace for Leeds in a 2–1 win over Manchester United away at Old Trafford, securing his club's first away league victory over their rivals since 1981.

== International career ==
Okafor played various international games for the Swiss U-15 and U-17 teams. He played his first game for the U-18 team on 9 May 2018 in the 1–1 draw against the Italy U-18 team.

Okafor made his senior debut for the Switzerland national team on 9 June 2019 in the 2019 UEFA Nations League third place game against England, as an 113th-minute substitute for Haris Seferovic. He scored his first international goal for Switzerland over two years later on 15 November 2021, in their World Cup qualifying game against Bulgaria, a win which secured automatic qualification for Switzerland to the 2022 FIFA World Cup.

On 20 May 2026, Okafor was selected in Switzerland's 26-man squad for the 2026 FIFA World Cup.

On 10 September 2026, Okafor announced that he would no longer play for Switzerland under manager Murat Yakin, citing a 'break down in trust' as the issue, ending his international career indefinitely.

== Personal life ==
Born in Binningen, Okafor is the son of a Nigerian father and a Swiss mother. His younger brothers Elijah and Isaiah are also footballers, playing respectively for FC Lugano II and the U-21 side of FC Zürich.

== Career statistics ==
=== Club ===
As of match played 21 November 2026

Appearances and goals by club, season and competition
Club	Season	League			National cup (Note: Includes Swiss Cup, Austrian Cup, DFB-Pokal, Coppa Italia, FA Cup)		League cup (Note: Includes EFL Cup)		Europe		Other		Total	
Club	Season	Division	Apps	Goals	Apps	Goals	Apps	Goals	Apps	Goals	Apps	Goals	Apps	Goals
Basel U21	2017–18	Swiss Promotion League	13	1	—		—		—		—		13	1
Basel U21	2018–19	Swiss Promotion League	2	1	—		—		—		—		2	1
Basel U21	Total		15	2	—		—		—		—		15	2
Basel	2017–18	Swiss Super League	1	0	0	0	—		0	0	—		1	0
Basel	2018–19	Swiss Super League	24	3	3	1	—		1 (Note: Appearance(s) in UEFA Europa League)	0	—		28	4
Basel	2019–20	Swiss Super League	14	0	2	1	—		7 (Note: Three appearances in UEFA Champions League, four appearances and two goals in UEFA Europa League)	2	—		23	3
Basel	Total		39	3	5	2	—		8	2	—		52	7
Red Bull Salzburg	2019–20	Austrian Bundesliga	11	3	3	1	—		1	0	—		15	4
Red Bull Salzburg	2020–21	Austrian Bundesliga	18	6	4	0	—		7 (Note: Six appearances in UEFA Champions League, one appearance in UEFA Europa League)	0	—		29	6
Red Bull Salzburg	2021–22	Austrian Bundesliga	21	9	5	2	—		8 (Note: Appearances in UEFA Champions League)	3	—		34	14
Red Bull Salzburg	2022–23	Austrian Bundesliga	21	7	3	0	—		8 (Note: Six appearances and three goals in UEFA Champions League, two appearances in UEFA Europa League)	3	—		32	10
Red Bull Salzburg	Total		71	25	15	3	—		24	6	—		110	34
AC Milan	2023–24	Serie A	28	6	0	0	—		8 (Note: Three appearances in UEFA Champions League, five appearances in UEFA Europa League)	0	—		36	6
AC Milan	2024–25	Serie A	11	1	1	0	—		5	0	0	0	17	1
AC Milan	2025–26	Serie A	0	0	1	0	—		—		—		1	0
AC Milan	Total		39	7	2	0	—		13	0	0	0	54	7
Napoli (loan)	2024–25	Serie A	4	0	—		—		—		—		4	0
Leeds United	2025–26	Premier League	28	8	4	0	1	0	—		—		33	8
Leeds United	2026–27	Premier League	10	4	0	0	2	0	—		—		12	4
Leeds United	Total		38	12	4	0	3	0	—		—		45	12
Career total			206	49	26	5	3	0	45	8	0	0	280	62

=== International ===
Appearances and goals by national team and year
National team	Year	Apps	Goals
Switzerland	2019	1	0
Switzerland	2020	0	0
Switzerland	2021	2	1
Switzerland	2022	9	1
Switzerland	2023	7	0
Switzerland	2024	5	0
Switzerland	2025	0	0
Switzerland	2026	2	0
Total		26	2

As of match played 2 June 2022
Scores and results list Switzerland's goal tally first, score column indicates score after each Okafor goal.

List of international goals scored by Noah Okafor
No.	Date	Venue	Opponent	Score	Result	Competition
1	15 November 2021	Swissporarena, Lucerne, Switzerland	Bulgaria	1–0	4–0	2022 FIFA World Cup qualification
2	2 June 2022	Sinobo Stadium, Prague, Czech Republic	Czech Republic	1–1	1–2	2022–23 UEFA Nations League A

== Honours ==
Basel

- Swiss Cup: 2018–19

Red Bull Salzburg

- Austrian Bundesliga: 2019–20, 2020–21, 2021–22, 2022–23
- Austrian Cup: 2019–20, 2020–21, 2021–22

AC Milan

- Supercoppa Italiana: 2024–25

Napoli

- Serie A: 2024–25

Individual

- Swiss Super League Young Player of the Year: 2019–20
