= Gerardo Seoane =

Swiss football manager (born 1978)

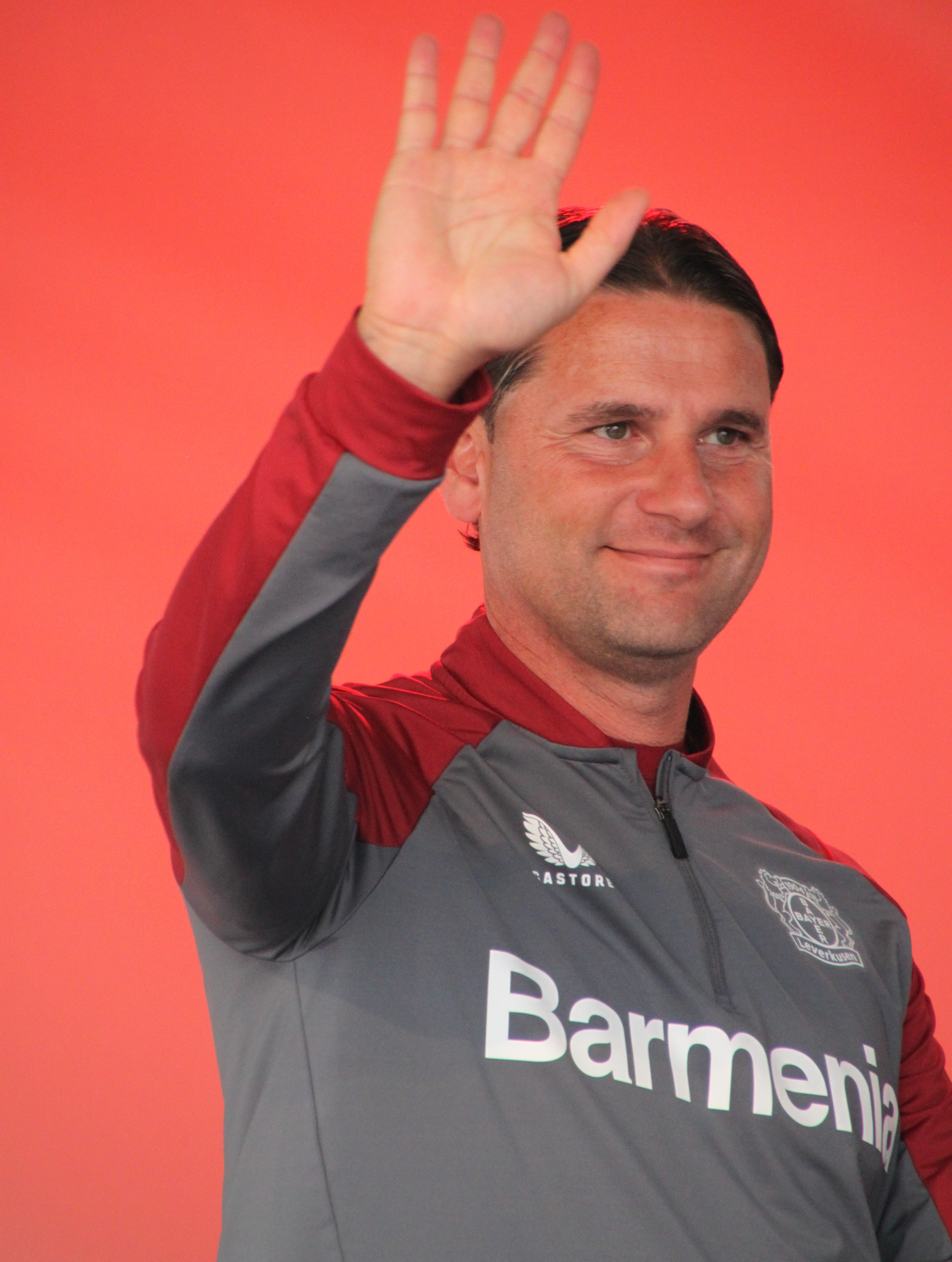
- Seoane in 2022

Personal information
- Full name: Gerardo Seoane Castro
- Date of birth: 30 October 1978 (age 48)
- Place of birth: Luzern, Switzerland
- Height: 1.86 m (6 ft 1 in)
- Positions: Defender; midfielder

Youth career
- 1986–1990: FC Rothenburg
- 1990–1995: Luzern

Senior career*
Years	Team	Apps	(Gls)
1995–1997	Luzern	39	(2)
1997–1998	Sion	13	(1)
1998–2002	Deportivo La Coruña B	91	(24)
1999–2000	→ Bellinzona (loan)	9	(0)
2002–2004	Aarau	62	(4)
2004–2006	Grasshoppers	48	(4)
2007–2010	Luzern	74	(2)
Total		336	(37)

International career
1997–1999	Switzerland U21	18	(3)

Managerial career
- 2013: Luzern (interim)
- 2014–2018: Luzern II
- 2018: Luzern
- 2018–2021: Young Boys
- 2021–2022: Bayer Leverkusen
- 2023–2025: Borussia Mönchengladbach
- 2025–: Young Boys
- * Club domestic league appearances and goals

Gerardo Seoane Castro (born 30 October 1978) also known as Gerry Seoane, is a Swiss professional football coach and former player, who is the current manager of BSC Young Boys.

== Managerial career ==
Seoane was appointed manager of reigning Swiss Super League champions Young Boys on 2 June 2018. Seoane, aged 39, was considered a surprise pick to succeed Adi Hütter as coach, despite guiding FC Luzern to third place in the Super League in his first full management job. Upon taking the role as Young Boys manager, Seoane pledged to continue with Hütter's playing style and keep the backroom staff in place.

In his first season in charge, he guided the club to their 13th league title and helped the club qualify to the group stage of the UEFA Champions League for the first time in club history. In his second season, Seoane led the club to a domestic double, delivering their 14th league title (their third in a row) and seventh cup title and first in over 30 years.

In May 2021, it was announced that Seoane would coach Bundesliga club Bayer Leverkusen. In the 2021–22 season, he led Bayer Leverkusen to finish third in the Bundesliga, to be their best finish in seven seasons. However, he was sacked on 5 October 2022, due to his Leverkusen's poorest season start since their promotion in 1979. Leverkusen had won only one game, drawn two, and lost five games, resulting in only five points in their first eight games. In June 2023, he was named the new head coach of Borussia Mönchengladbach, starting from the 2023–24 season. He was sacked in September 2025.

On 31 October 2025, he returned to BSC Young Boys, signing a contract until summer 2028.

== Personal life ==
Seoane was born in Luzern, Switzerland to Galician parents and holds both Swiss and Spanish citizenship. In addition to German, he is also fluent in Spanish, English, French, Italian, and Galician.

== Managerial statistics ==
As of 21 November 2026

Managerial record by team and tenure
Team	From	To	Record							
Team	From	To	G	W	D	L	GF	GA	GD	Win %
Luzern (interim)	4 April 2013	8 April 2013	1	0	0	1	1	2	−1	0.00
Luzern	5 January 2018	2 June 2018	17	10	4	3	26	17	+9	58.82
Young Boys	2 June 2018	30 June 2021	148	97	27	24	323	166	+157	65.54
Bayer Leverkusen	1 July 2021	5 October 2022	56	26	10	20	114	81	+33	46.43
Borussia Monchengladbach	1 July 2023	15 September 2025	78	25	20	33	130	137	−7	32.05
Young Boys	31 October 2025	present	48	22	11	15	116	84	+32	45.83
Total			348	180	72	96	710	487	+223	51.72

== Honours ==
=== Manager ===
Young Boys

- Swiss Super League: 2018–19, 2019–20, 2020–21
- Swiss Cup: 2019–20

Individual

- Swiss Super League Manager of the Year: 2018–19, 2019–20, 2020–21,
