= Christophe Moulin (footballer, born 1958) =

Swiss footballer and manager

Personal information
- Date of birth: 6 November 1958 (age 67)
- Position: Defender

Senior career*
Years	Team	Apps	(Gls)
1977–1981	FC Martigny-Sports		
1981–1984	FC Sion		
1984–1988	FC Martigny-Sports		
1988–1991	FC Monthey		

Managerial career
- 1988–1992: FC Monthey (player-coach)
- 1992–1997: FC Martigny-Sports
- 1997–2000: FC Stade Nyonnais
- 2001–2002: FC Bagnes
- 2002–2005: FC Martigny-Sports
- 2005–2006: FC Sion
- 2007: FC Baulmes
- * Club domestic league appearances and goals

Christophe Moulin (born 6 November 1958) is a Swiss football manager and former player who played as a defender.

== Honours ==
=== Manager ===
Sion

- Swiss Cup: 2005–06
