= André Neitzke =

Brazilian footballer (born 1986)

Personal information
- Full name: André Luis Neitzke
- Date of birth: 24 November 1986 (age 39)
- Place of birth: Paraná, Brazil
- Height: 1.86 m (6 ft 1 in)
- Position: Centre back

Team information
- Current team: Brühl
- Number: 5

Senior career*
| Years | Team | Apps | (Gls) |
| 2004–2005 | Caxias do Sul | | |
| 2006 | Cerezo Osaka | 0 | (0) |
| 2006–2008 | Tokushima Vortis | 48 | (2) |
| 2010 | São José | 2 | (0) |
| 2011–2013 | Porto Alegre | 14 | (0) |
| 2013 | Veranópolis | 2 | (0) |
| 2013 | Taubaté | | |
| 2014 | Toledo | 16 | (2) |
| 2014–2017 | Schaffhausen | 113 | (5) |
| 2017 | Sion | 1 | (0) |
| 2017–2018 | Sion U21 | | |
| 2018–2019 | Sion | 48 | (1) |
| 2019–2020 | Neuchâtel Xamax | 32 | (1) |
| 2021–2022 | Schaffhausen | 45 | (2) |
| 2022– | Brühl | 82 | (8) |
- * Club domestic league appearances and goals as of 22 June 2025

André Luis Neitzke, or simply Andre, (born 24 November 1986) is a Brazilian midfielder who plays for Swiss club Brühl.

== Career ==
He played for Tokushima Vortis for three seasons.

On 5 September 2020, he returned to Schaffhausen on a three-year contract.

On 18 December 2021, Neitzke agreed to move to Brühl in January 2022.

== Career statistics ==
Appearances and goals by club, season and competition
| Club | Season | League | | | Emperor's Cup | | J.League Cup | | Total | |
| Club | Season | Division | Apps | Goals | Apps | Goals | Apps | Goals | Apps | Goals |
|---|---|---|---|---|---|---|---|---|---|---|
| Cerezo Osaka | 2006 | J1 League | 0 | 0 | 0 | 0 | 0 | 0 | 0 | 0 |
| Tokushima Vortis | 2006 | J2 League | 17 | 2 | 0 | 0 | — | | 17 | 2 |
| Tokushima Vortis | 2007 | J2 League | 20 | 0 | 1 | 0 | — | | 21 | 0 |
| Tokushima Vortis | 2008 | J2 League | 11 | 0 | 0 | 0 | — | | 11 | 0 |
| Career total | | | 48 | 2 | 1 | 0 | 0 | 0 | 49 | 2 |
