= Guy David (football) =

French footballer (1947–2008)

Personal information
- Date of birth: 25 July 1947
- Place of birth: Marseille, France
- Date of death: 30 August 2008 (aged 61)
- Place of death: Fréjus, France
- Height: 1.75 m (5 ft 9 in)

Youth career
- 1960–1965: SO Caillols

Senior career*
Years	Team	Apps	(Gls)
1965–1967	SO Caillols		
1967–1968	SMUC		
1968–1971	AS Mazargues		
1971–1972	Martigues	22	(1)
1972–1973	Cannes	16	(0)
1973–1976	FC Yonnais		
1976–1980	Stade Raphaëlois		

Managerial career
- 1976–1983: Stade Raphaëlois
- 1983–1987: Fréjus
- 1991–1992: Toulon
- 1992–1993: Beauvais
- 1993–1996: Le Havre
- 1996–1997: Caen
- 1997–1998: Rennes
- 1999–2000: Nice
- 2001: Martigues
- 2003–2004: Sion
- 2004–2005: Créteil
- 2007–2008: Fréjus
- * Club domestic league appearances and goals

Guy David (25 July 1947 – 30 August 2008) was a French football player and coach.

He played for Martigues, Cannes and La Roche Vendée Football.

After his playing career, he became a coach with Stade Raphaëlois, Fréjus, Toulon, Beauvais, Le Havre, Caen, Rennes, Nice, Martigues, Sion and Créteil.

He died of myocardial infarction after an ES Fréjus match.
