= Laurent Roussey =

French footballer and manager (born 1961)

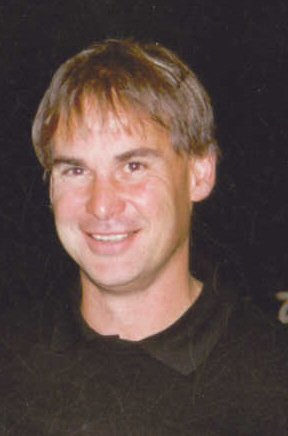
- Roussey during the 2006–07 season

Personal information
- Date of birth: 27 December 1961 (age 64)
- Place of birth: Nîmes, France
- Height: 1.79 m (5 ft 10 in)
- Position: Striker

Youth career
- –1974: AS Mazargues
- 1974–1977: Saint-Étienne

Senior career*
Years	Team	Apps	(Gls)
1977–1983	Saint-Étienne	105	(32)
1983–1985	Toulouse	42	(13)
1985–1987	Toulon	16	(0)
1987–1988	Olympique Alès	16	(2)
1988–1989	Lausanne-Sport	19	(6)
1989–1991	Red Star Saint-Ouen	47	(12)
Total		245	(65)

International career
1982	France	2	(1)

Managerial career
- 1995–2000: Rouen
- 2000–2001: Créteil
- 2001–2002: Sion
- 2002–2006: Lille (assistant)
- 2006–2007: Saint-Étienne (assistant)
- 2007–2008: Saint-Étienne
- 2011–2012: Sion
- 2012–2013: Lausanne-Sport
- 2013–2014: Sion
- 2015–2016: Créteil
- 2019–2020: Lyon-Duchère
- * Club domestic league appearances and goals

Laurent Roussey (born 27 December 1961) is a French football manager and former player, who played as a striker. He was most recently manager of Lyon-Duchère.

== Career ==
On 22 October 2013, Roussey joined Sion as manager for the third time.

Without a club since July 2017, he joined an academy in Africa to take care of coaching a team under 19 years old. In May 2019, he returned to management with Lyon-Duchère. In February 2020, he was sacked by the club.

== Honours ==
=== Player ===
Saint-Étienne

- French championship: 1981

=== Manager ===
Sion

- Swiss Cup: 2010–11
