= Jean-Claude Donzé =

Swiss footballer, club manager, and executive

Personal information
- Date of birth: 2 May 1948 (age 78)
- Position: Goalkeeper

Senior career*
Years	Team	Apps	(Gls)
1967–1969	FC La Chaux-de-Fonds		
1969–1979	FC Sion		

Managerial career
- 1981–1988: FC Sion
- 1988–1989: Servette FC
- * Club domestic league appearances and goals

Jean-Claude Donzé (born 2 May 1948) is a retired Swiss football executive, club manager and former goalkeeper.

== Biography ==
Jean-Claude Donzé started his football career as goalkeeper in the Swiss Super League from 1967 to 1979, mostly with FC Sion. He was named manager of FC Sion from 1981 to 1987, where he was the longest-serving head coach in the club's history. In 1988, he was offered to manage Servette FC, which he did for two years. He ended his managerial career in 1989.

Amongst his successes, Jean-Claude Donzé won three Swiss Cup finals with FC Sion, the first of which as goalkeeper in 1974 and the other two as manager in 1982 and 1986. He totalled 18 UEFA Europa League matches, including a quarter-final with FC Sion in 1987 and a round of 16 with Servette FC in 1988. He was named Swiss football manager of the year in 1984. Jean-Claude Donzé chaired the Pantalon Club Valais-Sion in 1998-1999.

Jean-Claude Donzé subsequently served as vice chair of the Swiss Football League from 2013 to 2017. A member of the Swiss Football League executive committee since 1995, he held various senior positions, amongst which chair of the competition commission from 1999 to 2005 and the national training commission from 2009 to 2019. He was awarded honorary membership of the Swiss Football League in 2017.

From 2005 to 2017, he was board member of the Swiss Football Association. From 2009 to 2019, he served as head of delegation of Switzerland national under-21 football team, which achieved its best ever result as runner-up at 2011 UEFA European Under-21 Championship. He also served as head of delegation of Switzerland national football team at 2012 Summer Olympics.
