= Isaiah Okafor =

Swiss footballer (born 2005)

Personal information
- Date of birth: 22 April 2005 (age 21)
- Place of birth: Binningen, Switzerland
- Height: 1.91 m (6 ft 3 in)
- Position: Midfielder

Team information
- Current team: Wil
- Number: 23

Youth career
- –2022: Basel
- 2022–2024: Bayer Leverkusen

Senior career*
Years	Team	Apps	(Gls)
2024–2026	Zürich U21	46	(1)
2025–2026	Zürich	1	(0)
2026–	Wil	8	(2)

International career^{‡}
2022	Switzerland U17	2	(0)
2023	Switzerland U18	5	(0)
2024	Switzerland U19	2	(0)
2025	Switzerland U20	3	(0)
- * Club domestic league appearances and goals as of 18 September 2026 ‡ National team caps and goals as of 31 March 2026

Isaiah Okafor (born 22 April 2005) is a Swiss footballer who plays as a midfielder for Swiss Challenge League club Wil.

== Early life ==
Okafor started playing football at the age of five.

== Career ==
As a youth player, Okafor joined the youth academy of German Bundesliga side Bayer Leverkusen, where he was described as a "regular member of the U19 team".

Okafor made his senior Swiss Super League debut for Zürich on 29 October 2025 against Basel.

== Style of play ==
Okafor mainly operates as a midfielder and is known for his passing ability.

== Personal life ==
Okafor is the brother of Switzerland international Noah Okafor.
