= Christian Zermatten =

Swiss football manager

Personal information
- Date of birth: 21 June 1966 (age 60)
- Place of birth: Sion, Switzerland

Managerial career
- Years: Team
- 1993–1996: Perak
- 2001–2002: Africa Sports
- 2002–2003: MO Constantine
- 2003–2004: Stade Malien
- 2004–2005: Sion
- 2005–2006: Fribourg
- 2006–2007: Nyon
- 2007–2008: Chiasso
- 2008–2009: Sion
- 2010–2012: Gabès
- 2012–2013: USM Annaba
- 2013–2004: CR Al Hoceima
- 2014–2015: Savièse
- 2015–2016: Naters
- 2017: Fribourg
- 2019: Sion

Christian Zermatten (born 21 June 1966) is a Swiss professional football manager. Zermatten coached professional teams in Switzerland, Malaysia, Algeria, Morocco, Tunisia, and Ivory Coast, but is best known for his stints managing FC Sion.
