= Fassnacht =

Fassnacht or Faßnacht is a German surname. Notable people with the surname include:

- Christian Fassnacht (born 1993), Swiss footballer
- Hans Fassnacht (born 1950), German swimmer
- Robert Fassnacht (1937–1970), American physicist
- Rudi Faßnacht (1934–2000), German football manager
