= Raphaël Nuzzolo =

Swiss footballer (born 1983)

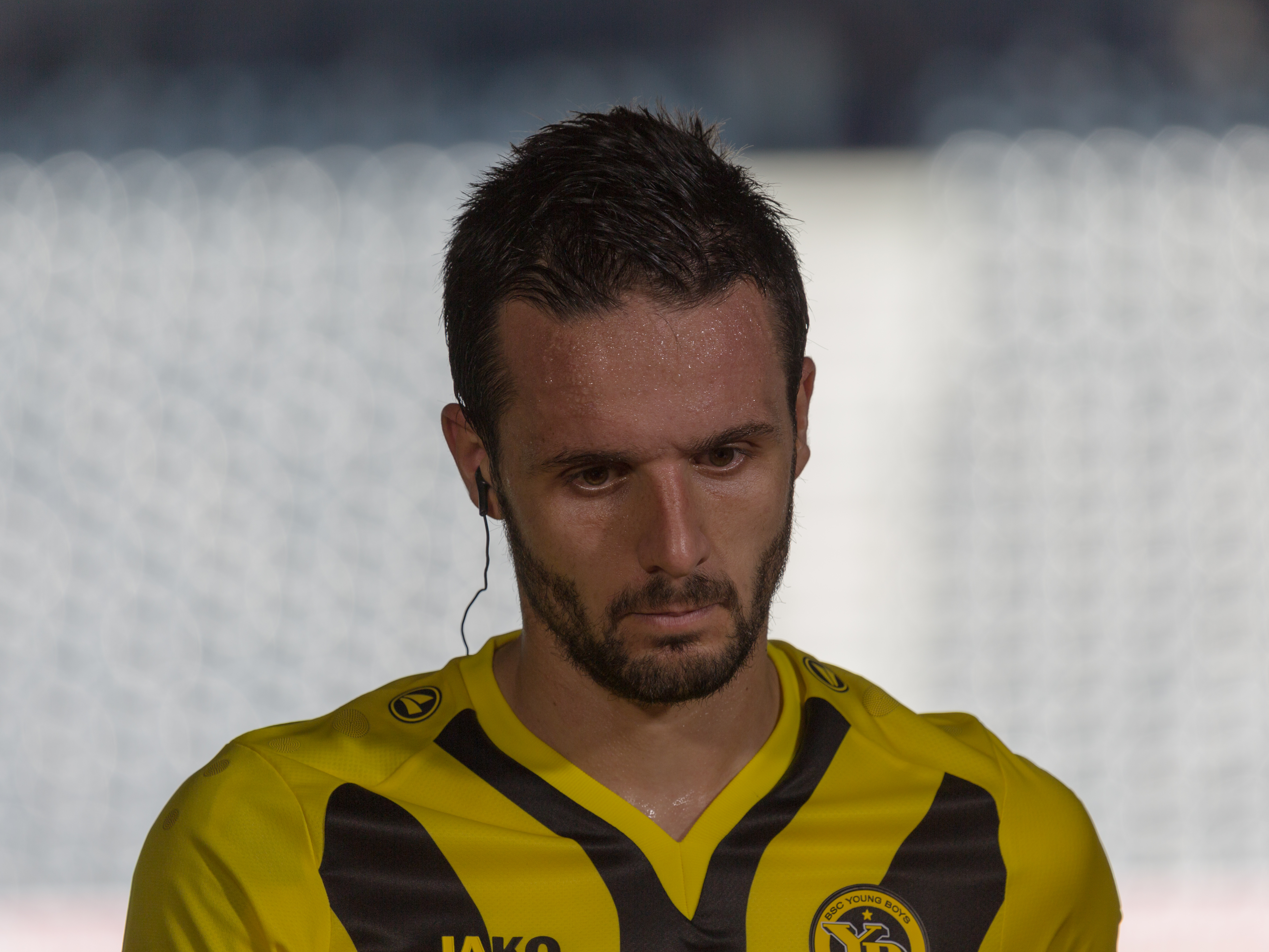

Personal information
- Date of birth: 5 July 1983 (age 43)
- Place of birth: Biel, Switzerland
- Height: 1.75 m (5 ft 9 in)
- Position: Midfielder

Team information
- Current team: Young Boys (scout)

Youth career
- 1990–1999: Biel-Bienne

Senior career*
Years	Team	Apps	(Gls)
1999–2001	Biel-Bienne	39	(11)
2001–2011	Neuchâtel Xamax	217	(41)
2011–2016	Young Boys	148	(25)
2016–2023	Neuchâtel Xamax	238	(98)
- * Club domestic league appearances and goals

Raphaël Nuzzolo (born 5 July 1983) is a Swiss former professional football midfielder. He spent the majority of his playing career with Neuchâtel Xamax. He currently works as a scout for BSC Young Boys.

== Career ==
=== Xamax ===
Born in Biel, Nuzzolo began playing football for hometown club Biel-Bienne. After two seasons there he joined Neuchâtel Xamax in 2001. Originally hired as a forward, he only started to be successful years later when he was moved to the position of right midfielder.

In 2006, Miroslav Blazevic who was then trainer at Neuchâtel Xamax, declared that "Nuzzolo has a future in the Swiss national team". On Sunday 19 February 2006 he scored his first goal at the highest Swiss level on a 2–2 tie in Zurich against Grasshoppers.

During the 2008–09 season, as Xamax's trainer by then Nestor Clausen had difficulties finding a performant right back, he moved Nuzzolo to this position, which he kept for most of the season.

In the 2009–10 season, Nuzzolo proved being a key player of the team as either a left or right midfielder and has been regarded by many as the club's best player for that season. For the 2010–11 season he was elected captain of the first team, reinforcing his position as a both a key a local figure at the start of his 10th season for the club.

=== Young Boys ===
On 16 July 2011, he was transferred to Young Boys for an undisclosed fee.

After five years with Young Boys, he returned to Xamax ahead of the 2016–17 season. Despite having a year left on his contract, he reached an agreement with the club to dissolve the contract early.

=== Xamax and retirement ===
After two years in Neuchâtel, Nuzzolo achieved promotion back to the Swiss Super League in 2018.

In the following season, he narrowly avoided relegation, with Xamax beating FC Aarau on penalties after a 4–4 aggregate score in the relegation playoff. Aarau had won the first leg in Neuchâtel 4–0, where Nuzzolo had been sent off in the 52nd minute. However, in the next season, they were unable to stave off relegation and were forced to return to the Challenge League after two years in the top tier.

On 3 May 2023, he announced his retirement from football, following the end of the 2022–23 Swiss Challenge League season. His last act at Xamax was helping the team stay in the Challenge League, as his last game was a 3–0 victory over FC Rapperswil-Jona in the relegation play-off. In his second stint at Xamax he scored 98 goals in 238 league appearances. In his 488 appearances for Xamax, he scored a total of 137 goals.

=== Post-retirement ===
On 16 June 2023, he returns to Young Boys to work in their scouting department under head scout Stéphane Chapuisat.

== Personal life ==
Nuzzolo was born in Switzerland and is of Italian descent.

== Honours ==
Individual

- Swiss Super League Top assists provider: 2018–19
