= Jonathan Sabbatini =

Uruguayan footballer (born 1988)

Personal information
- Full name: Jonathan Maximiliano Sabbatini Perfecto
- Date of birth: 31 March 1988 (age 38)
- Place of birth: Paysandú, Uruguay
- Height: 1.76 m (5 ft 9 1/2 in)
- Position: Attacking midfielder

Team information
- Current team: Bellinzona
- Number: 4

Youth career
- 2006–2008: Liverpool Montevideo

Senior career*
Years	Team	Apps	(Gls)
2008–2009	Virtus Lanciano	7	(0)
2009–2012	Chieti	88	(19)
2012–2024	Lugano	379	(44)
2024–	Bellinzona	22	(0)
- * Club domestic league appearances and goals as of 1 July 2025

Jonathan Maximiliano Sabbatini Perfecto (born 31 March 1988) is a Uruguayan footballer who plays as a midfielder for Swiss Challenge League side Bellinzona.

== Club career ==
Sabbatini joined Lugano on 27 August 2012 and played his first match in the Swiss Cup on 15 September 2012, a 4–0 win against FC Olten. Lugano at the time were playing in the Swiss Challenge League, the second tier of Swiss football. In his third season at the club, he helped Lugano achieve promotion in 2015, comfortably winning the Challenge League. From 2016 onward, he captained the squad.

On 2 May 2021, he played his 300th match for the bianconeri. On 6 May 2022, at the end of his tenth season at the Cornaredo, he decided to extend his contract for a further season. The agreement includes a further year as the club's scout. On 17 May 2023, he took an option to extend his contract at Lugano for a further twelfth season.

On 23 June 2024, FC Lugano announced Sabbatini's departure. He decided to not end his playing career and rejected the club's offer of a non-playing position.

On 5 September 2024, Sabbatini signed with Bellinzona.

== Personal life ==
Sabbatini was born in Uruguay and is of Italian descent, and holds an Italian passport.

== Career statistics ==
As of 17 May 2024

Club	Season	Competition	League		National cup (Note: Includes Swiss Cup)		Europe		Total	
Club	Season	Competition	Apps	Goals	Apps	Goals	Apps	Goals	Apps	Goals
Virtus Lanciano	2008–09	Serie C1	7	0	0	0	–		7	0
Virtus Lanciano	Total		7	0	0	0	–		7	0
Chieti	2009–10	Serie D	23	5	0	0	–		23	5
Chieti	2010–11	Serie C2	29	4	0	0	–		29	4
Chieti	2011–12	Serie C2	36	10	0	0	–		36	10
Chieti	Total		88	19	0	0	–		88	19
Lugano	2012–13	Swiss Challenge League	24	2	2	0	–		26	2
Lugano	2013–14	Swiss Challenge League	32	6	2	1	–		34	7
Lugano	2014–15	Swiss Challenge League	31	6	2	0	–		33	6
Lugano	2015–16	Swiss Super League	33	6	5	1	–		38	7
Lugano	2016–17	Swiss Super League	30	3	0	0	–		30	3
Lugano	2017–18	Swiss Super League	33	4	4	1	6 (Note: Appearances in UEFA Europa League)	0	43	5
Lugano	2018–19	Swiss Super League	34	5	4	1	–		38	6
Lugano	2019–20	Swiss Super League	26	1	1	0	3	0	30	1
Lugano	2020–21	Swiss Super League	30	0	2	0	–		32	0
Lugano	2021–22	Swiss Super League	35	4	5	1	–		39	5
Lugano	2022–23	Swiss Super League	35	3	6	1	2 (Note: Appearances in UEFA Europa Conference League)	0	42	4
Lugano	2023–24	Swiss Super League	36	4	6	1	6	0	48	5
Lugano	Total		378	44	39	7	17	0	434	51
Career total			473	63	39	7	17	0	529	70

== Honours ==
Lugano

- Swiss Cup
  - Winner (1): 2021–22
  - Runner-up (2): 2015–16, 2022–23
- Swiss Challenge League
  - Winner (1): 2014–15
- Swiss Super League
  - Runner-up (1): 2023–24
