= Laurent Walthert =

Swiss footballer (born 1984)

Personal information
- Date of birth: 30 March 1984 (age 42)
- Place of birth: Neuchâtel, Switzerland
- Height: 1.78 m (5 ft 10 in)
- Position: Goalkeeper

Senior career*
Years	Team	Apps	(Gls)
2002–2010	Xamax	9	(0)
2005	→ Meyrin (loan)	6	(0)
2005–2006	→ La Chaux-de-Fonds (loan)	12	(0)
2010–2013	Biel-Bienne	93	(0)
2013–2022	Xamax	250	(0)
- * Club domestic league appearances and goals

Laurent Walthert (born 30 March 1984) is a Swiss former football goalkeeper.
