= Stade de la Maladière =

Football stadium in Switzerland

Coordinates: 46.9952°N 6.9440°E

- Maladière
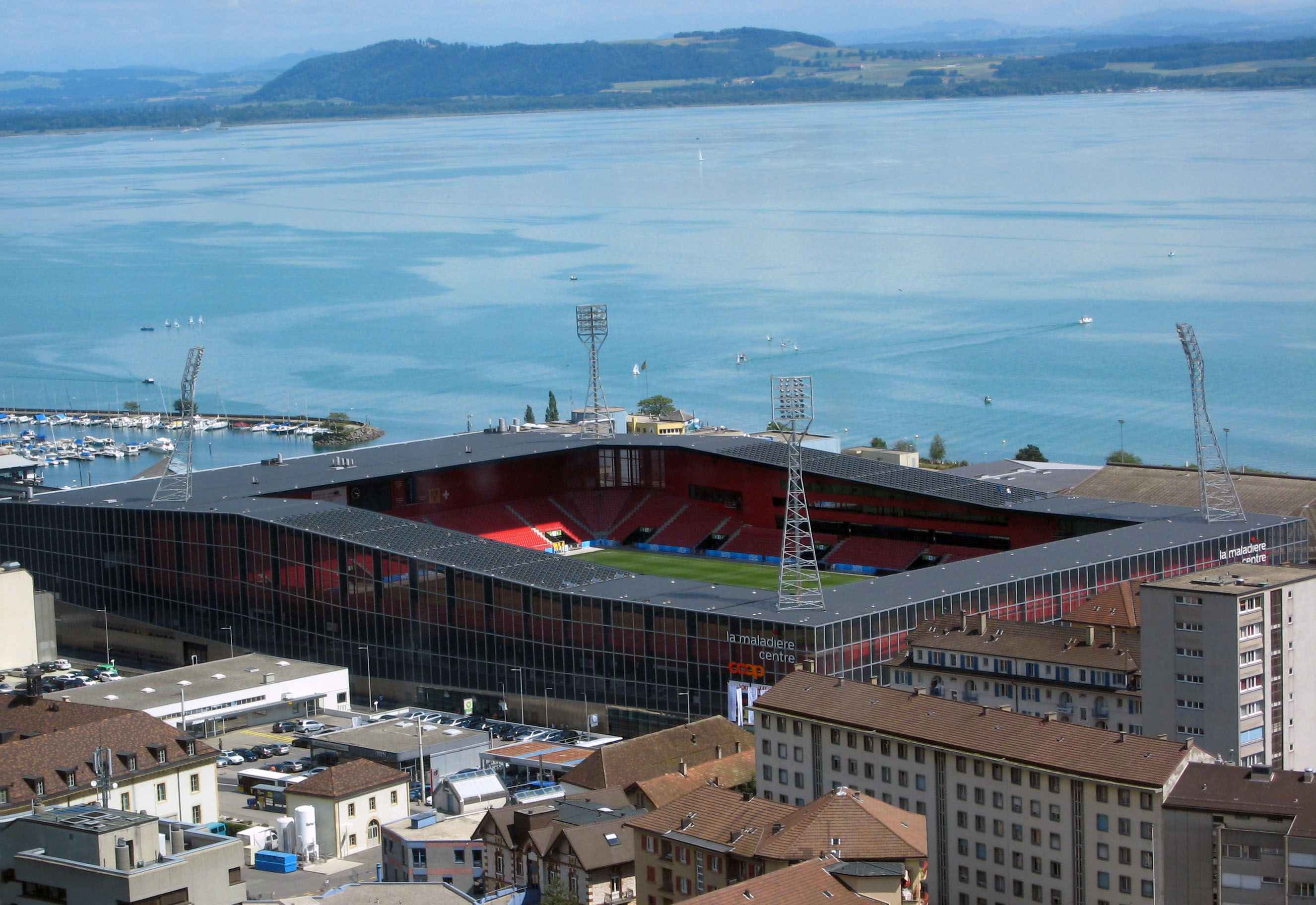
- Interactive map of Stade de la Maladière
- Location: Neuchâtel, Switzerland
- Capacity: 12,000
- Surface: Synthetic

Construction
- Opened: 18 April 2007
- Cost: CHF 300 million
- Architects: Laurent Geninasca & Bernard Delefortrie

Tenants
- Neuchâtel Xamax (2007–present); Yverdon-Sport FC (July–September 2023); Switzerland national football team (selected matches)

Stade de la Maladière is a multi-purpose stadium in Neuchâtel, Switzerland. It is currently used mostly for football matches and is the home ground of Neuchâtel Xamax. The stadium holds 12,000. It replaced the old Stade de la Maladière.

== History ==
The stadium opened in February 2007, with Neuchatel Xamax defeating La Chaux-de-Fonds by a scoreline of 3–2 in front of a sell-out crowd of 12,000 people. The stadium complex was officially inaugurated in June 2007. The complex includes a shopping mall underneath the stadium, a fire house, and six gymnasiums. A small piece of the roof fell off in July 2007.

The stadium has used a synthetic turf since its opening. The turf was replaced in 2015.

Portugal used the stadium as a training base for Euro 2008.

The European Rugby headquarters moved to the stadium site in 2014.

On 12 June 2023, Yverdon-Sport temporary play in Stade de la Maladiere for 2023–24 Super League in 2 months due to Stade Municipal didn't apply for Super League matches.

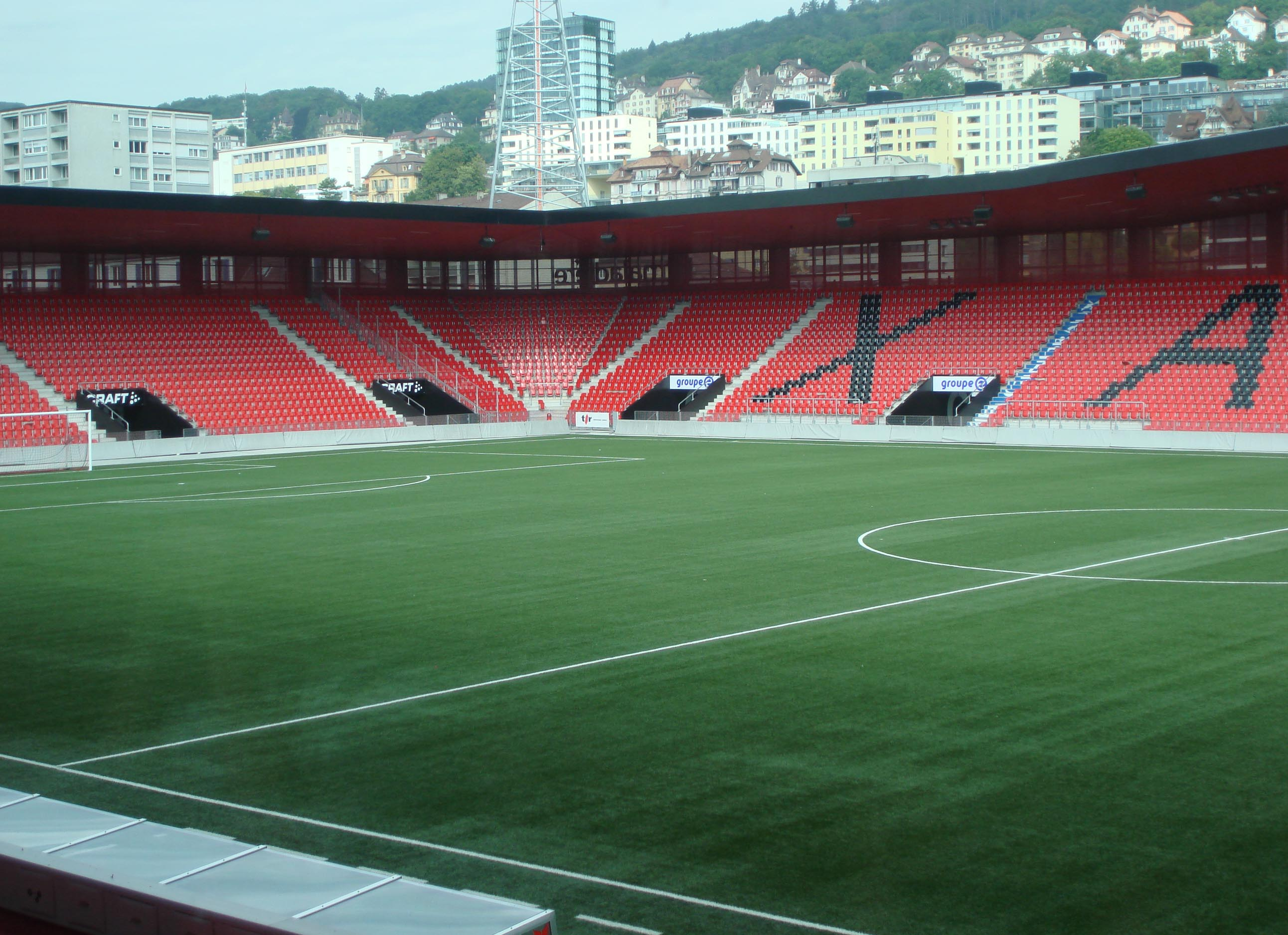

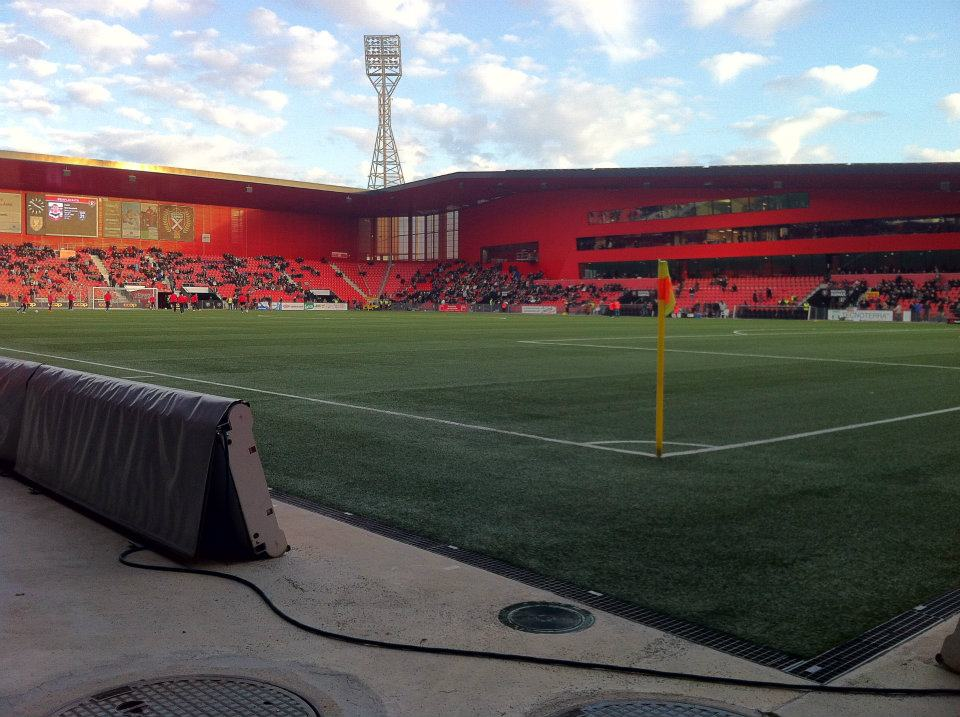
