= FC Sion =

Association football team in Switzerland

Sion
- Full name: Football Club de Sion
- Founded: 1909; 117 years ago
- Ground: Stade de Tourbillon
- Capacity: 14,283
- Chairman: Christian Constantin
- Head coach: Didier Tholot
- League: Swiss Super League
- 2025–26: Swiss Super League, 4th of 12
- Website: fcsion.ch
Home colours	Away colours

FC Sion, also known simply as Sion or formally as Football Club Sion, with the club's first team incorporated as Olympique des Alpes SA, is a Swiss football club from the city of Sion. Playing in the Swiss Super League, the highest tier of Swiss football, it has also won 13 Swiss Cups. The club was founded in 1909 and play their home matches at the Stade de Tourbillon.

== History ==
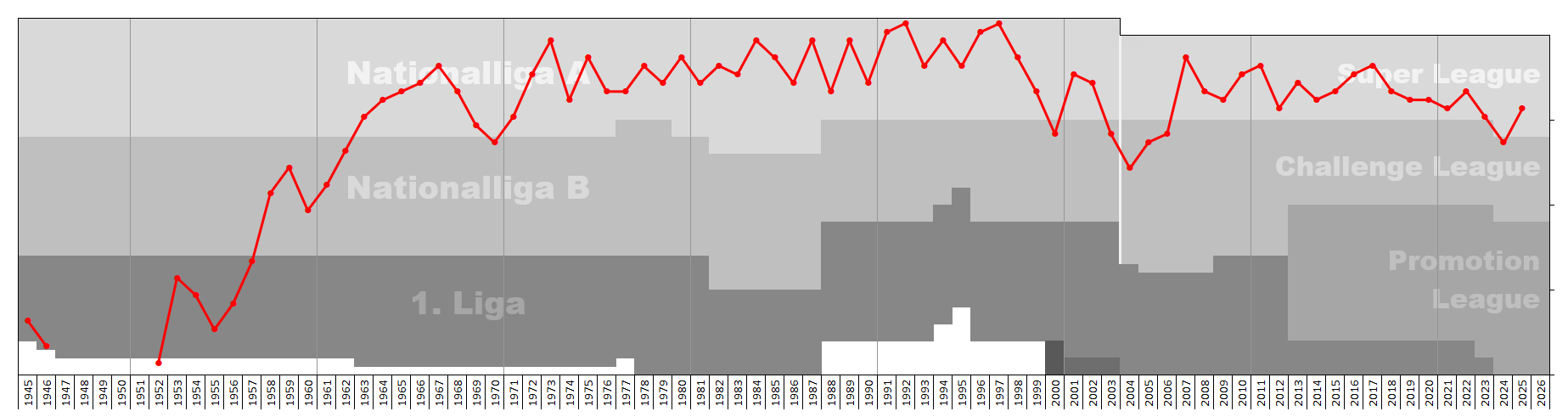
Chart of FC Sion table positions in the Swiss football league system

FC Sion were founded in 1909 by Robert Gilliard, who became club captain, and played their first match the same year, a 3–2 win against FC Aigle. The club grew thanks to contributions from locals, and played their first competitive league fixture in 1914, again a 3–2 victory, against FC Monthey. In 1919, Sion formally organised its managerial structure, with Gilliard becoming vice-president and Charles Aymon taking the presidency.

From 1932, Sion played in the fourth tier of Swiss football, where they spent much of the next 20 years, briefly interrupted by promotion to the third tier in 1944, quickly followed by relegation in 1946. In 1952, Sion returned to the third tier. Five years later, Sion gained promotion again to the National League B, followed five years later by promotion to the National League A (now the Swiss Super League) in 1962. 1965 saw the first of Sion's Swiss Cup wins following a 2–1 victory over Servette.

The 16,263 capacity Stade Tourbillon was officially opened in August 1968, but the club was relegated in 1969. Sion returned to the National League A at the first attempt and secured a second victory in the Swiss Cup, winning 3–2 against Neuchâtel Xamax in 1974. Sion would go on to consistently perform well in the Swiss Cup, with victories in 1980 (against Young Boys), 1982 (against Basel), 1986 (against Servette) and 1991 (against Young Boys). This period of success also saw the renovation and expansion of the Tourbillon in 1989, and was crowned with Sion's first Swiss League Championship in 1992.

More success in the Swiss Cup followed, winning the tournament in three consecutive years from 1995 with victories over Grasshopper, Servette and Luzern. Their win against Luzern in 1997 secured Sion their only domestic double, having also won the Swiss League.

However, the club quickly fell into financial trouble, and having narrowly avoided bankruptcy due to its purchase by Gilbert Kadji, the club suffered relegation in 1999. Despite returning to the top division the following season, financial problems plagued the team, culminating in relegation in 2001, the departure of Kadji and a denial of a professional license in 2003. The club was saved by architect and former footballer Christian Constantin, and they were re-instated into the second division in October 2003.

Constantin spent the following seasons rebuilding the club, with the club going through 20 managers in the following eight years, including taking the role himself twice, in a bid to financially stabilize. In 2006, He was rewarded with promotion back to the Super League, as well as a victory in the Swiss Cup, becoming the first second-tier team to achieve this, with a 5–3 penalty shoot-out victory over Young Boys after a 1–1 draw.

=== Transfer ban saga ===
In 2008, controversy came to Sion when they signed Essam El Hadary, leading to a two-year "registration period" ban for Sion from June 2009, and an international playing ban for El Hadary for four months, due to El-Hadary still being under contract at his former club Al Ahly. Sion appealed this action, but the Federal Supreme Court of Switzerland confirmed the FIFA, DRC and Court of Arbitration for Sport (CAS) decisions in 2009 and 2010 respectively. However, the lengthy legal battle (including the temporary reprieve) meant the ban was only practically instituted beginning in the winter transfer window of the 2010–11 season.

Although gaining a place in the qualifying round of the 2011–12 UEFA Europa League by winning the previous season's Swiss Cup, Sion were excluded from the Europa League by UEFA after fielding ineligible players in their play-off victory against Celtic. On 2 September, the Swiss Football League (SFL) rejected the registration of one more player, Brian Amofa.

On 30 September 2011, the SFL decided to provisionally qualify the six new signings, namely Stefan Glarner, Billy Ketkeophomphone, Mario Mutsch, Pascal Feindouno, José Gonçalves and Gabri, to comply with the ongoing legal process. Sion also sued the SFL and UEFA respectively in the Tribunal Cantonal de Valais and the Tribunal in Vaud, however both actions were dismissed. The club's earlier appeal was dismissed by UEFA Appeals Body on 13 September. Sion also sued the SFL and UEFA in the CAS, but withdrew the former claim. The hearing of the latter claim was set on 24 November.

On 25 October, the Discipline Commission (fr: Commission de discipline) of SFL suspended all six players for five matches. It was reported that each player filed their legal claim in civil court instead of using the Swiss FA and CAS "sports court" system, which the ban was requested by FIFA. On 27 October, as a "provisional and super-provisional measures", UEFA invited Sion to a match schedule consultation once UEFA lost the legal battle.

On 31 October 2011, Sion sent a complaint to the European Commission. FIFA also won the legal battle in civil court in November. Previously, the civil court of Martigny and Saint-Maurice (both of the city of Valais) ordered FIFA to confirm the signing of those six players on 3 August, a consequence of lawsuit brought out by the players. On 16 November, FIFA and the SFL appeal was upheld in the Valais canton court.

On 15 December, the CAS upheld the complaints by UEFA, affirming its right to discipline Sion according to previous agreements. The CAS also lifted the provisional measures ordered by the Tribunal Cantonal of Vaud (Cour civile) on 5 October 2011. After the ruling, FIFA threatened to suspend Swiss national and club teams from international competition if Sion were not appropriately penalized for its ostensible rules violations. In late December 2011, the Swiss Football Association complied with FIFA's demands and penalized Sion 36 standings points (based on how many matches ineligible players were involved), moving the club to last place in the league standings and putting the club at risk of relegation if the ruling stood.

Sion finished the 2011–12 season in ninth place, which qualified them to the relegation matches against Aarau, whom they defeated 2–1 on aggregate to stay in the Swiss Super League. Without suffering their 36-point deduction Sion would have finished in the third place, which would have qualified them into the 2012–13 UEFA Europa League. Prior to the start of the 2012–13 season, they made a major coup by signing Gennaro Gattuso and Kyle Lafferty, both via free transfers. However, the club had a disappointing season which saw them change coaches three times before settling on Gattuso to finish the season, ending in third place.

Sion finished the 2014–15 season in second place as runner-up, which qualified to the UEFA Europa League Group Stage for the first time in history from next season. In 2015–16, Sion reached to Round of 32 Europa League until Eliminated by S.C. Braga with aggregate 3–4.

=== Suffering relegation and return to top tier ===
In 2022–23, Sion suffered relegation to the Challenge League after a loss on aggregate by Stade Lausanne Ouchy 2–6 and ended a top flight spell after 17 years. The following season, Sion secured promotion to the Super League after defeating FC Schaffhausen 3–0 on 20 May 2024 as champions of the Challenge League for the first time in their history in a rare appearance outside the top tier and return to the top tier after a year absence.

== Honours ==
Sion held the distinction of having never lost a domestic cup final, with 13 wins in 13 appearances in the Swiss Cup, until a defeat by Basel in the 2017 edition.

- Swiss Super League
  - Champions (2): 1991–92, 1996–97
- Swiss Challenge League
  - Champions (1): 2023–24
- Swiss Cup
  - Winners (13): 1964–65, 1973–74, 1979–80, 1981–82, 1985–86, 1990–91, 1994–95, 1995–96, 1996–97, 2005–06, 2008–09, 2010–11, 2014–15

== Stadium ==
Sion play their home matches at the multi-purpose Stade Tourbillon, which has a capacity of 14,500. It was originally constructed in 1968, and was renovated in 1989 and 2012. The club also has a training centre near its office in Martigny and a youth development center in nearby Riddes.

== Players ==
=== Current squad ===
As of 14 September 2026

Note: Flags indicate national team as defined under FIFA eligibility rules; some limited exceptions apply. Players may hold more than one non-FIFA nationality.

No.	Pos.	Nation	Player
1	GK	SUI	Anthony Racioppi
5	DF	FRA	Noé Sow
6	DF	BRA	Marquinhos Cipriano
7	FW	MLT	Ilyas Chouaref
8	MF	BRA	Batata
9	FW	SUI	Josias Lukembila
10	MF	KOS	Benjamin Kololli
12	GK	SUI	Francesco Ruberto
13	FW	SUI	Winsley Boteli
14	DF	SUI	Numa Lavanchy
17	DF	SUI	Jan Kronig
19	FW	SUI	Franck Surdez
20	DF	SUI	Nias Hefti

No.	Pos.	Nation	Player
21	MF	SUI	Liam Chipperfield
22	MF	SUI	Adrien Llukes
24	DF	SUI	Damien Möschinger
28	DF	KOS	Kreshnik Hajrizi
29	FW	SUI	Théo Berdayes
33	FW	KOS	Rilind Nivokazi
37	MF	FRA	Fodé Sylla
38	DF	SUI	Ryan Kessler
40	GK	SUI	Simon Caillet
55	DF	ITA	Lorenzo Villa
77	MF	KOS	Donat Rrudhani
88	MF	SUI	Ali Kabacalman

=== Out on loan ===
Note: Flags indicate national team as defined under FIFA eligibility rules; some limited exceptions apply. Players may hold more than one non-FIFA nationality.

No.	Pos.	Nation	Player
—	DF	SUI	Maxime Dubosson (at Étoile Carouge until 30 June 2027)
—	DF	SUI	Edian Gashi (at Nyonnais until 30 June 2027)
—	DF	SUI	Noah Grognuz (at Nyonnais until 30 June 2027)
—	DF	SUI	Gilles Richard (at Yverdon until 30 June 2027)

No.	Pos.	Nation	Player
—	MF	ALB	Burak Alili (at Nyonnais until 30 June 2027)
—	MF	HAI	Belmar Joseph (at Monterey Bay until 30 November 2026)
—	MF	SUI	Pierrick Moulin (at Nyonnais until 30 June 2027)
—	FW	SUI	Ruben Londja (at Nyonnais until 30 June 2027)

=== Other players under contract ===
Note: Flags indicate national team as defined under FIFA eligibility rules; some limited exceptions apply. Players may hold more than one non-FIFA nationality.

No.	Pos.	Nation	Player
—	GK	COD	Timothy Fayulu
—	DF	ITA	Gabriele Mulazzi

No.	Pos.	Nation	Player
—	FW	KOS	Altin Shala

=== Former players ===
- (Belgium) Izzet Akgül
- (Cameroon) Alex Song
- (Latvia) Roberts Uldriķis
- (Italy) Mario Balotelli
- (Italy) Gennaro Gattuso
- (Brazil) Adryan
- (Brazil) Matheus Cunha
- (France) Wylan Cyprien
- (Russia) Anton Miranchuk

== Club officials ==
As of 15 June 2023

Position	Staff
President	(Switzerland) Christian Constantin
Vice-president	(Switzerland) Gelson Fernandes
Chief Executive Officer	(Italy) Massimo Cosentino
Sporting CEO	(Switzerland) Barthélémy Constantin
Team Manager	(Switzerland) Christian Lurati
Manager	(France) Didier Tholot
Assistant manager	(Switzerland) Lucien Duverne
First-team coach	(Switzerland) François Bastien
Goalkeeping coach	(Switzerland) Pierre De Kalbermatten (Switzerland) Massimo Colomba
Fitness coach	(Switzerland) Mattia Garrone
Video analyst	(Switzerland) Antoine Monsieur
Director of Development	(Switzerland) Pablo Iglesias
Club doctor	(Switzerland) Baptiste Graoully
Physiotherapist	(Switzerland) Raoul Caserne (Switzerland) Simon Herzhaft (Switzerland) Étienne Sommelier (Switzerland) Luca Valente (Switzerland) Paolo Bilello (Switzerland) Yoann Demangeot
Masseur	(Switzerland) Malk Husseine
Kit Manager	(Switzerland) Felix Volken

== Historical list of coaches ==
- (Italy) Vittorio Barberis (1947–49)
- Carlo Pinter (1949–51)
- Joseph Wuilloud (1951–52)
- Henri Humbert & Mathey (1952–53)
- Paul Allégroz (1953–54)
- Henri Humbert (1954–55)
- Jacques Guhl (1955–59)
- (Switzerland) Frank Séchehaye (1959–61)
- (Germany) Karl-Heinz Spikofski (July 1961 – March 63)
- (Socialist Federal Republic of Yugoslavia) Lev Mantula (March 1963 – July 67)
- (Socialist Federal Republic of Yugoslavia) Stojan Osojnak (July 1967 – Nov 68)
- (Switzerland) Peter Rösch (Nov 1968 – July 70)
- Maurice Meylan (July 1970 – Sept 71)
- (Socialist Federal Republic of Yugoslavia) Miroslav Blažević (Sept 1971 – July 76)
- (Hungary) István Szabó (1976–79)
- (Switzerland) Daniel Jeandupeux (1 July 1979 – 30 June 1980)
- (Argentina) Oscar Fulloné (1980–81)
- (Switzerland) Jean-Claude Donzé (July 1981 – Jan 88)
- (Hungary) Péter Pázmándy (Jan 1988 – July 89)
- Yves Débonnaire (1989–90)
- (Argentina) Enzo Trossero (1990–92)
- (Switzerland) Jean-Paul Brigger (1 July 1992 – 31 Dec 1992)
- (Switzerland) Claude Andrey (Jan 1993 – July 93)
- (Switzerland) Umberto Barberis (1 July 1993 – Oct 94)
- (France) Jean-Claude Richard (1 Oct 1994 – 30 June 1995)
- (Switzerland) Michel Decastel (1 July 1995 – 30 June 1996)
- (France) Jean-Claude Richard (1 Aug 1996 – 30 Aug 1996)
- (Italy) Alberto Bigon (10 Aug 1996 – 19 Oct 1997)
- (France) Jean-Claude Richard (Sept 1, 1997 – 30 March 1998)
- (Germany) Jochen Dries (March 1998 – Nov 98)
- (Switzerland) Charly In-Albon (Nov 1998 – March 99)
- (France) Olivier Rouyer (March 1999 – July 99)
- (Switzerland) Roberto Morinini (1 July 1999 – 30 Nov 1999)
- (Algeria) Henri Stambouli (5 Jan 2000 – 14 July 2001)
- (France) Laurent Roussey (1 July 2001 – 30 June 2002)
- (France) Jean-Claude Richard (1 July 2002 – 30 March 2003)
- (Switzerland) Charly Rössli (1 Jan 2003 – 30 June 2003)
- (France) Didier Tholot (1 July 2003 – 3 Nov)
- (France) Didier Tholot & (France) Guy David (Nov 2003 – 4 Jan)
- (France) Didier Tholot, (France) Guy David & Ami Rebord
  (Jan 2004 – 30 June 2004)
- (Bosnia and Herzegovina) Admir Smajić (20 April 2004 – 30 June 2004)
- (Switzerland) Christian Zermatten (1 July 2004 – 10 Aug 2004)
- (France) Gilbert Gress (9 Aug 2004 – 27 March 2005)
- (Italy) Gianni Dellacasa (27 March 2005 – 16 Oct 2005)
- (Switzerland) Christophe Moulin (19 Oct 2005 – 1 May 2006)
- (Argentina) Néstor Clausen (1 July 2006 – 1 Oct 2006)
- (Switzerland) Christophe Moulin (interim) (Oct 2006)
- (Switzerland) Marco Schällibaum (6 Oct 2006 – 21 Nov 2006)
- (Switzerland) Pierre-Albert Chapuisat (21 Nov 2006 – 19 Feb 2007)
- (Italy) Alberto Bigon (19 Feb 2007 – 13 Dec 2007)
- (Switzerland) Charly Rössli (18 Dec 2007 – 25 March 2008)
- (Italy) Alberto Bigon (March 2008 – 8 May)
- (Germany) Uli Stielike (1 July 2008 – 3 Nov 2008)
- (Switzerland) Christian Constantin (interim) (Nov 2008 – 8 Dec)
- (Switzerland) Christian Zermatten & (Switzerland) Umberto Barberis
  (24 Dec 2008 – 10 April 2009)
- (Switzerland) Christian Constantin (interim) (April 2009)
- (France) Didier Tholot (14 April 2009 – 21 May 2010)
- (Switzerland) Bernard Challandes (1 July 2010 – 22 Feb 2011)
- (France) Laurent Roussey (22 Feb 2011 – 23 April 2012)
- (France) Rolland Courbis (interim) (2 April 2012 – 5 June 2012)
- (Bosnia and Herzegovina) Vladimir Petković (15 May 2012 – 2 June 2012)
- (Switzerland) Sébastien Fournier (1 June 2012 – Sept 3, 2012)
- (Switzerland) Michel Decastel (Sept 4, 2012 – 30 Oct 2012)
- (Switzerland) Pierre-André Schürmann (30 Oct 2012 – 10 Dec 2012)
- (Spain) Víctor Muñoz (1 Jan 2013 – 25 Feb 2013)
- (Italy) Gennaro Gattuso (25 Feb 2013 – 25 March 2013)
- (Italy) Luigi Riccio (interim) (1 March 2013 – 24 March 2013)
- (Switzerland) Arno Rossini (26 March 2013 – 13 May 2013)
- (Switzerland) Michel Decastel (15 May 2013 – 21 Oct 2013)
- (Switzerland) Laurent Roussey (22 Oct 2013 – 11 Feb 2014)
- (Switzerland) Raimondo Ponte (11 Feb 2014 – 5 Jun 2014)
- (Italy) Claudio Gentile (5 Jun 2014 – 12 Jun 2014)
- (Switzerland) Frédéric Chassot (12 Jun 2014 – 28 Sep 2014)
- (Germany) Jochen Dries (28 Sep 2014 – 8 Dec 2014)
- (France) Didier Tholot (17 Dec 2014 – 12 Aug 2016)
- (Germany) Peter Zeidler (22 Aug 2016 – 25 Apr 2017)
- (Switzerland) Sébastien Fournier (25 Apr 2017 – 15 Jun 2017)
- (Italy) Paolo Tramezzani (15 Jun 2017 – 22 Oct 2017)
- (Spain) Gabri García (25 Oct 2017 – 6 Feb 2018)
- (Switzerland) Maurizio Jacobacci (6 Feb 2018 – 17 Sep 2018)
- (Switzerland) Murat Yakin (17 Sep 2018 – 7 May 2019)
- (Switzerland) Christian Zermatten (interim) (8 May 2019 – 30 June 2019)
- (Switzerland) Stéphane Henchoz (1 July 2019 – 3 Nov 2019)
- (Switzerland) Christian Zermatten (interim) (4 Nov 2019 – 31 Dec 2019)
- (Portugal) Ricardo Dionisio (1 Jan 2020 – 3 June 2020)
- (Italy) Paolo Tramezzani (3 June 2020 – 7 Aug 2020)
- (Italy) Fabio Grosso (25 Aug 2020 – 5 Mar 2021)
- (France) Ugo Raczynski (interim) (5 Mar 2021 – 16 Mar 2021)
- (Switzerland) Marco Walker (16 Mar 2021 – 8 Oct 2021)
- (Italy) Paolo Tramezzani (9 Oct 2021 – 20 Nov 2022)
- (Switzerland) Fabio Celestini (21 Nov 2022 – 3 Mar 2023)
- (France) David Bettoni (7 Mar 2023 – 15 May 2023)
- (Italy) Paolo Tramezzani (16 May 2023 – 15 June 2023)
- (France) Didier Tholot (15 June 2023 – Present)

== European record ==
Season	Competition	Round	Opponents	Home	Away	Aggregate
1965–66	European Cup Winners' Cup	1R	(Turkey) Galatasaray	5–1	1–2	6–3
1965–66	European Cup Winners' Cup	2R	(East Germany) 1. FC Magdeburg	2–2	1–8	3–10
1973–74	UEFA Cup	1R	(Italy) Lazio	3–1	0–3	3–4
1974–75	European Cup Winners' Cup	1R	(Sweden) Malmö FF	1–0	0–1	1–1 (5–4 p)
1980–81	European Cup Winners' Cup	1R	(Norway) Haugar	1–1	0–2	1–3
1982–83	European Cup Winners' Cup	PR	(Scotland) Aberdeen	1–4	0–7	1–11
1984–85	UEFA Cup	1R	(Spain) Atlético Madrid	1–0	3–2	4–2
1984–85	UEFA Cup	2R	(Socialist Federal Republic of Yugoslavia) Željezničar	1–1	1–2	2–3
1986–87	European Cup Winners' Cup	1R	(Scotland) Aberdeen	3–0	1–2	4–2
1986–87	European Cup Winners' Cup	2R	(Poland) Katowice	3–0	2–2	5–2
1986–87	European Cup Winners' Cup	QF	(East Germany) Lokomotiv Leipzig	0–0	0–2	0–2
1987–88	UEFA Cup	1R	(Socialist Federal Republic of Yugoslavia) Velež Mostar	3–0	0–5	3–5
1989–90	UEFA Cup	1R	(Greece) Iraklis	2–0	0–1	2–1
1989–90	UEFA Cup	2R	(East Germany) FC Karl-Marx-Stadt	2–1	1–4	3–5
1991–92	European Cup Winners' Cup	1R	(Iceland) Valur	1–1	1–0	2–1
1991–92	European Cup Winners' Cup	2R	(Netherlands) Feyenoord	0–0	0–0	0–0 (3–5 p)
1992–93	UEFA Champions League	1R	(Ukraine) Tavriya Simferopol	4–1	3–1	7–2
1992–93	UEFA Champions League	2R	(Portugal) Porto	2–2	0–4	2–6
1994–95	UEFA Cup	1R	(Cyprus) Apollon Limassol	2–3	3–1	5–4 (a.e.t.)
1994–95	UEFA Cup	2R	(France) Marseille	2–0	1–3	3–3 (a)
1994–95	UEFA Cup	3R	(France) Nantes	2–2	0–4	2–6
1995–96	European Cup Winners' Cup	QR	(Moldova) Tiligul Tiraspol	3–2	0–0	3–2
1995–96	European Cup Winners' Cup	1R	(Greece) AEK Athens	2–2	0–2	2–4
1996–97	European Cup Winners' Cup	QR	(Lithuania) Kareda Šiauliai	4–2	0–0	4–2
1996–97	European Cup Winners' Cup	1R	(Ukraine) Nyva Vinnytsia	2–0	4–0	6–0
1996–97	European Cup Winners' Cup	2R	(England) Liverpool	1–2	3–6	4–8
1997–98	UEFA Champions League	1Q	(Luxembourg) Jeunesse Esch	4–0	1–0	5–0
1997–98	UEFA Champions League	2Q	(Turkey) Galatasaray	1–4	1–4	2–8
1997–98	UEFA Cup	1R	(Russia) Spartak Moscow	0–1	1–5	1–6
2006–07	UEFA Cup	2Q	(Austria) SV Ried	1–0	0–0	1–0
2006–07	UEFA Cup	1R	(Germany) Bayer Leverkusen	0–0	1–3	1–3
2007–08	UEFA Cup	2Q	(Austria) SV Ried	3–0	1–1	4–1
2007–08	UEFA Cup	1R	(Turkey) Galatasaray	3–2	1–5	4–7
2009–10	UEFA Europa League	PO	(Turkey) Fenerbahçe	0–2	2–2	2–4
2011–12	UEFA Europa League	PO	(Scotland) Celtic	0–3^{1}	0–3^{1}	0–6^{1}
2015–16	UEFA Europa League	Group B	(Russia) Rubin Kazan	2–1	0–2	2nd
2015–16	UEFA Europa League	Group B	(England) Liverpool	0–0	1–1	2nd
2015–16	UEFA Europa League	Group B	(France) Bordeaux	1–1	1–0	2nd
2015–16	UEFA Europa League	R32	(Portugal) Braga	1–2	2–2	3–4
2017–18	UEFA Europa League	3Q	(Lithuania) Sūduva Marijampolė	1–1	0–3	1–4
2026–27	UEFA Conference League	2Q	(Belarus) BATE Borisov	4–0	1–1	5–1
2026–27	UEFA Conference League	3Q	(Armenia) Noah	2–1	2–2	4–3
2026–27	UEFA Conference League	PO	(Netherlands) Ajax	2–4	3–5	5–9

Notes

- Note 1: Celtic lodged protests over the eligibility of a number of the Sion players who participated in the two legs of the play-off round, which Sion won 3–1 aggregate (first leg: 0–0; second leg: 3–1). The UEFA Control and Disciplinary Body accepted the protests and decided to award both matches to Celtic by forfeit (3–0). As a consequence, Celtic qualified for the UEFA Europa League group stage.
