= 2022–23 UEFA Europa Conference League knockout phase =

The 2022–23 UEFA Europa Conference League knockout phase began on 16 February with the knockout round play-offs and ended on 7 June 2023 with the final at the Fortuna Arena in Prague, Czech Republic, to decide the champions of the 2022–23 UEFA Europa Conference League. A total of 24 teams competed in the knockout phase.

Times are CET/CEST, (Note: CET (UTC+1) for dates up to 25 March 2023 (round of 16), and CEST (UTC+2) for dates thereafter (quarter-finals, semi-finals and final).) as listed by UEFA (local times, if different, are in parentheses).

== Qualified teams ==
The knockout phase involved 24 teams: the 16 teams which qualified as winners and runners-up of each of the eight groups in the group stage, and the eight third-placed teams from the Europa League group stage.

=== Europa Conference League group stage winners and runners-up ===
Group	Winners (advance to round of 16 and seeded in draw)	Runners-up (advance to KO play-offs and seeded in draw)
A	(Turkey) İstanbul Başakşehir	(Italy) Fiorentina
B	(England) West Ham United	(Belgium) Anderlecht
C	(Spain) Villarreal	(Poland) Lech Poznań
D	(France) Nice	(Serbia) Partizan
E	(Netherlands) AZ	(Ukraine) Dnipro-1
F	(Sweden) Djurgårdens IF	(Belgium) Gent
G	(Turkey) Sivasspor	(Romania) CFR Cluj
H	(Slovakia) Slovan Bratislava	(Switzerland) Basel

=== Europa League group stage third-placed teams ===
Group	Third-placed teams (advance to KO play-offs and unseeded in draw)
A	(Norway) Bodø/Glimt
B	(Cyprus) AEK Larnaca
C	(Bulgaria) Ludogorets Razgrad
D	(Portugal) Braga
E	(Moldova) Sheriff Tiraspol
F	(Italy) Lazio
G	(Azerbaijan) Qarabağ
H	(Turkey) Trabzonspor

== Format ==
Each tie in the knockout phase, apart from the final, was played over two legs, with each team playing one leg at home. The team that scored more goals on aggregate over the two legs advanced to the next round. If the aggregate score was level, then 30 minutes of extra time were played (the away goals rule was not applied). If the score was still level at the end of extra time, the winners were decided by a penalty shoot-out. In the final, which was played as a single match, if the score was level at the end of normal time, extra time would be played, followed by a penalty shoot-out if the score was still level. The mechanism of the draws for each round was as follows:

- In the draw for the knockout round play-offs, the eight group runners-up were seeded, and the eight Europa League group third-placed teams were unseeded. The seeded teams were drawn against the unseeded teams, with the seeded teams hosting the second leg. Teams from the same association could not be drawn against each other.
- In the draw for the round of 16, the eight group winners were seeded, and the eight winners of the knockout round play-offs were unseeded. Again, the seeded teams were drawn against the unseeded teams, with the seeded teams hosting the second leg. Teams from the same association could not be drawn against each other.
- In the draws for the quarter-finals and semi-finals, there were no seedings, and teams from the same association could be drawn against each other. As the draws for the quarter-finals and semi-finals were held together before the quarter-finals were played, the identity of the quarter-final winners was not known at the time of the semi-final draw. A draw was also held to determine which semi-final winner would be designated as the "home" team for the final (for administrative purposes as it was played at a neutral venue).

In the knockout phase, teams from the same or nearby cities (Roma and Lazio, Fenerbahçe and İstanbul Başakşehir, and Anderlecht and Union SG, who share the same stadium), the first team listed played in the Europa League were not scheduled to play at home on the same day, due to logistics and crowd control. To avoid such scheduling conflicts, UEFA had to make adjustments. For the knockout round playoffs and a round of 16, since both teams were in the same pot and must play at home in a given leg, the home match of the team that was not the domestic cup or Europa Conference League winner, or lower domestic ranking (if neither is the domestic cup or Europa Conference League winner; i.e. Lazio and Anderlecht for this season), was moved from Thursday to Wednesday. For the quarter-finals and semi-finals, if the two teams were drawn to play at home for the same leg, the order of legs of the tie involving the team with the lowest priority was reversed from the original draw.

== Schedule ==
The schedule was as follows (all draws were held at the UEFA headquarters in Nyon, Switzerland).

Round	Draw date	First leg	Second leg
Knockout round play-offs	7 November 2022, 14:00	16 February 2023	23 February 2023
Round of 16	24 February 2023, 13:00	9 March 2023	16 March 2023
Quarter-finals	17 March 2023, 14:00	13 April 2023	20 April 2023
Semi-finals	17 March 2023, 14:00	11 May 2023	18 May 2023
Final	17 March 2023, 14:00	7 June 2023 at Fortuna Arena, Prague	

== Bracket ==
Knockout round play-offs
(Norway) Bodø/Glimt	0	0	0
(Poland) Lech Poznań	0	1	1
(Portugal) Braga	0	2	2
(Italy) Fiorentina	4	3	7
(Turkey) Trabzonspor	1	0	1
(Switzerland) Basel	0	2	2
(Moldova) Sheriff Tiraspol	0	3	3
(Serbia) Partizan	1	1	2
(Azerbaijan) Qarabağ	1	0	1 (3)
(Belgium) Gent (p)	0	1	1 (5)
(Cyprus) AEK Larnaca	1	0	1
(Ukraine) Dnipro-1	0	0	0
(Bulgaria) Ludogorets Razgrad	1	1	2 (0)
(Belgium) Anderlecht (p)	0	2	2 (3)
(Italy) Lazio	1	0	1
(Romania) CFR Cluj	0	0	0

Round of 16
(Poland) Lech Poznań	2	3	5
(Sweden) Djurgårdens IF	0	0	0
(Italy) Fiorentina	1	4	5
(Turkey) Sivasspor	0	1	1
(Switzerland) Basel (p)	2	2	4 (4)
(Slovakia) Slovan Bratislava	2	2	4 (1)
(Moldova) Sheriff Tiraspol	0	1	1
(France) Nice	1	3	4
(Belgium) Gent	1	4	5
(Turkey) İstanbul Başakşehir	1	1	2
(Cyprus) AEK Larnaca	0	0	0
(England) West Ham United	2	4	6
(Belgium) Anderlecht	1	1	2
(Spain) Villarreal	1	0	1
(Italy) Lazio	1	1	2
(Netherlands) AZ	2	2	4

Quarter-finals
(Poland) Lech Poznań	1	3	4
(Italy) Fiorentina	4	2	6
(Switzerland) Basel (a.e.t.)	2	2	4
(France) Nice	2	1	3
(Belgium) Gent	1	1	2
(England) West Ham United	1	4	5
(Belgium) Anderlecht	2	0	2 (1)
(Netherlands) AZ (p)	0	2	2 (4)

Semi-finals
(Italy) Fiorentina (a.e.t.)	1	3	4
(Switzerland) Basel	2	1	3
(England) West Ham United	2	1	3
(Netherlands) AZ	1	0	1

Final
7 June – Prague
(Italy) Fiorentina	1
(England) West Ham United	2

== Knockout round play-offs ==
The draw for the knockout round play-offs was held on 7 November 2022, 14:00 CET.

=== Summary ===
The first legs were played on 16 February, and the second legs were played on 23 February 2023.

Team 1	Agg.	Team 2	1st leg	2nd leg
Qarabağ (Azerbaijan)	1–1 (3–5 p)	(Belgium) Gent	1–0	0–1 (a.e.t.)
Trabzonspor (Turkey)	1–2	(Switzerland) Basel	1–0	0–2
Lazio (Italy)	1–0	(Romania) CFR Cluj	1–0	0–0
Bodø/Glimt (Norway)	0–1	(Poland) Lech Poznań	0–0	0–1
Braga (Portugal)	2–7	(Italy) Fiorentina	0–4	2–3
AEK Larnaca (Cyprus)	1–0	(Ukraine) Dnipro-1	1–0	0–0
Sheriff Tiraspol (Moldova)	3–2	(Serbia) Partizan	0–1	3–1
Ludogorets Razgrad (Bulgaria)	2–2 (0–3 p)	(Belgium) Anderlecht	1–0	1–2 (a.e.t.)

=== Matches ===
16 February 2023
18:45 (21:45 UTC+4)

Qarabağ (Azerbaijan)	1–0	(Belgium) Gent
Andrade 78'	Report

Tofiq Bahramov Republican Stadium, Baku
Attendance: 25,452
Referee: Mohammed Al-Hakim (Sweden)
23 February 2023
21:00

Gent (Belgium)	1–0 (a.e.t.)	(Azerbaijan) Qarabağ
Orban 74'	Report
Penalties
De Sart (penalty scored); Cuypers (penalty scored); Orban (penalty scored); Marreh (penalty scored); Van Daele (penalty scored)	5–3	(penalty scored) Richard; (penalty scored) Diakhaby; (penalty scored) Bayramov; (penalty missed) Benzia

Ghelamco Arena, Ghent
Attendance: 11,724
Referee: Willie Collum (Scotland)

1–1 on aggregate; Gent won 5–3 on penalties.

16 February 2023
18:45 (20:45 UTC+3)

Trabzonspor (Turkey)	1–0	(Switzerland) Basel
Stryger Larsen 65'	Report

Şenol Güneş Sports Complex, Trabzon
Attendance: 26,184
Referee: Donatas Rumšas (Lithuania)
23 February 2023
21:00

Basel (Switzerland)	2–0	(Turkey) Trabzonspor
Amdouni 13'; Zeqiri 76'	Report

St. Jakob-Park, Basel
Attendance: 24,428
Referee: Antonio Mateu Lahoz (Spain)

Basel won 2–1 on aggregate.

16 February 2023
21:00

Lazio (Italy)	1–0	(Romania) CFR Cluj
Immobile 45+4'	Report

Stadio Olimpico, Rome
Attendance: 11,690
Referee: Craig Pawson (England)
23 February 2023
18:45 (19:45 UTC+2)

CFR Cluj (Romania)	0–0	(Italy) Lazio
	Report

Stadionul Dr. Constantin Rădulescu, Cluj-Napoca
Attendance: 15,955
Referee: Felix Zwayer (Germany)

Lazio won 1–0 on aggregate.

16 February 2023
18:45

Bodø/Glimt (Norway)	0–0	(Poland) Lech Poznań
	Report

Aspmyra Stadion, Bodø
Attendance: 6,925
Referee: Harald Lechner (Austria)
23 February 2023
21:00

Lech Poznań (Poland)	1–0	(Norway) Bodø/Glimt
Ishak 63'	Report

Stadion Poznań, Poznań
Attendance: 34,017
Referee: Nikola Dabanović (Montenegro)

Lech Poznań won 1–0 on aggregate.

16 February 2023
18:45 (17:45 UTC+0)

Braga (Portugal)	0–4	(Italy) Fiorentina
	Report	Jović 45+1', 60'; Cabral 79', 90'

Estádio Municipal, Braga
Attendance: 13,041
Referee: Carlos del Cerro Grande (Spain)
23 February 2023
21:00

Fiorentina (Italy)	3–2	(Portugal) Braga
Mandragora 37'; Saponara 58'; Cabral 83'	Report	Castro 16'; Djaló 34'

Stadio Artemio Franchi, Florence
Attendance: 13,603
Referee: Benoît Bastien (France)

Fiorentina won 7–2 on aggregate.

16 February 2023
21:00 (22:00 UTC+2)

AEK Larnaca (Cyprus)	1–0	(Ukraine) Dnipro-1
García 84'	Report

AEK Arena – Georgios Karapatakis, Larnaca
Attendance: 4,077
Referee: Jakob Kehlet (Denmark)
23 February 2023
18:45

Dnipro-1 (Ukraine)	0–0	(Cyprus) AEK Larnaca
	Report

Košická futbalová aréna, Košice, Slovakia (Note: Due to the Russian invasion of Ukraine, Ukrainian teams were required to play their home matches at neutral venues until further notice. Therefore, Dnipro-1 played at Košická futbalová aréna, Košice, Slovakia, instead of their regular stadium Dnipro-Arena, Dnipro.)
Attendance: 3,527
Referee: Andris Treimanis (Latvia)

AEK Larnaca won 1–0 on aggregate.

16 February 2023
21:00 (22:00 UTC+2)

Sheriff Tiraspol (Moldova)	0–1	(Serbia) Partizan
	Report	Gomes 45'

Zimbru Stadium, Chișinău (Note: Sheriff Tiraspol played their home match at Zimbru Stadium, Chișinău, instead of their regular stadium, Sheriff Stadium, Tiraspol, due to Transnistria's involvement in the Russian invasion of Ukraine.)
Attendance: 0 (Note: The match was played behind closed doors due to the possibility of Russia attempting a coup plot in Moldova.)
Referee: Harm Osmers (Germany)
23 February 2023
18:45

Partizan (Serbia)	1–3	(Moldova) Sheriff Tiraspol
Menig 13'	Report	Badolo 22' (pen.); Diop 45+1', 47'

Partizan Stadium, Belgrade
Attendance: 8,575
Referee: Andreas Ekberg (Sweden)

Sheriff Tiraspol won 3–2 on aggregate.

16 February 2023
21:00 (22:00 UTC+2)

Ludogorets Razgrad (Bulgaria)	1–0	(Belgium) Anderlecht
Thiago 9'	Report

Ludogorets Arena, Razgrad
Attendance: 4,417
Referee: Duje Strukan (Croatia)
23 February 2023
18:45

Anderlecht (Belgium)	2–1 (a.e.t.)	(Bulgaria) Ludogorets Razgrad
Russo 13' (o.g.); Verschaeren 68'	Report	Thiago 71'
Penalties
Refaelov (penalty scored); Vertonghen (penalty scored); Verschaeren (penalty scored)	3–0	(penalty missed) Pipa; (penalty missed) Yankov; (penalty missed) Naressi

Constant Vanden Stock Stadium, Brussels
Attendance: 15,822
Referee: Daniel Siebert (Germany)

2–2 on aggregate; Anderlecht won 3–0 on penalties.

== Round of 16 ==
The draw for the round of 16 was held on 24 February 2023, 13:00 CET.

=== Summary ===
The first legs were played on 7 and 9 March, and the second legs were played on 15 and 16 March 2023.

Team 1	Agg.	Team 2	1st leg	2nd leg
AEK Larnaca (Cyprus)	0–6	(England) West Ham United	0–2	0–4
Fiorentina (Italy)	5–1	(Turkey) Sivasspor	1–0	4–1
Lazio (Italy)	2–4	(Netherlands) AZ	1–2	1–2
Lech Poznań (Poland)	5–0	(Sweden) Djurgårdens IF	2–0	3–0
Basel (Switzerland)	4–4 (4–1 p)	(Slovakia) Slovan Bratislava	2–2	2–2 (a.e.t.)
Sheriff Tiraspol (Moldova)	1–4	(France) Nice	0–1	1–3
Anderlecht (Belgium)	2–1	(Spain) Villarreal	1–1	1–0
Gent (Belgium)	5–2	(Turkey) İstanbul Başakşehir	1–1	4–1

=== Matches ===
9 March 2023
18:45 (19:45 UTC+2)

AEK Larnaca (Cyprus)	0–2	(England) West Ham United
	Report	Antonio 36', 45+2'

AEK Arena – Georgios Karapatakis, Larnaca
Attendance: 6,654
Referee: Espen Eskås (Norway)
16 March 2023
21:00 (20:00 UTC+0)

West Ham United (England)	4–0	(Cyprus) AEK Larnaca
Scamacca 21'; Bowen 46', 49'; Mubama 65'	Report

London Stadium, London
Attendance: 40,482
Referee: Georgi Kabakov (Bulgaria)

West Ham United won 6–0 on aggregate.

9 March 2023
21:00

Fiorentina (Italy)	1–0	(Turkey) Sivasspor
Barák 69'	Report

Stadio Artemio Franchi, Florence
Attendance: 16,255
Referee: Enea Jorgji (Albania)
16 March 2023
18:45 (20:45 UTC+3)

Sivasspor (Turkey)	1–4	(Italy) Fiorentina
Yeşilyurt 35'	Report	Cabral 44'; Milenković 62'; Goutas 78' (o.g.); Castrovilli 89'

New Sivas 4 Eylül Stadium, Sivas
Attendance: 17,864
Referee: Nikola Dabanović (Montenegro)

Fiorentina won 5–1 on aggregate.

7 March 2023
18:45

Lazio (Italy)	1–2	(Netherlands) AZ
Pedro 18'	Report	Pavlidis 45'; Kerkez 62'

Stadio Olimpico, Rome
Attendance: 19,584
Referee: Glenn Nyberg (Sweden)
16 March 2023
21:00

AZ (Netherlands)	2–1	(Italy) Lazio
Karlsson 28'; Pavlidis 62'	Report	Felipe Anderson 21'

AFAS Stadion, Alkmaar
Attendance: 18,500
Referee: Matej Jug (Slovenia)

AZ won 4–2 on aggregate.

9 March 2023
21:00

Lech Poznań (Poland)	2–0	(Sweden) Djurgårdens IF
Milić 39'; Marchwiński 82'	Report

Stadion Poznań, Poznań
Attendance: 40,222
Referee: Stéphanie Frappart (France)
16 March 2023
18:45

Djurgårdens IF (Sweden)	0–3	(Poland) Lech Poznań
	Report	Marchwiński 77'; Kvekveskiri 90+1'; Skóraś 90+2'

Tele2 Arena, Stockholm
Attendance: 25,115
Referee: Duje Strukan (Croatia)

Lech Poznań won 5–0 on aggregate.

9 March 2023
21:00

Basel (Switzerland)	2–2	(Slovakia) Slovan Bratislava
Amdouni 6'; Zeqiri 40'	Report	Medveděv 17'; Abubakari 70'

St. Jakob-Park, Basel
Attendance: 13,202
Referee: Rade Obrenović (Slovenia)
16 March 2023
18:45

Slovan Bratislava (Slovakia)	2–2 (a.e.t.)	(Switzerland) Basel
Abubakari 10'; Kucka 17'	Report	Calafiori 53'; Amdouni 90+3'
Penalties
Kucka (penalty missed); Barseghyan (penalty missed); Lovat (penalty scored)	1–4	(penalty scored) Diouf; (penalty scored) Amdouni; (penalty scored) Calafiori; (penalty scored) Males

Tehelné pole, Bratislava
Attendance: 21,675
Referee: Jakob Kehlet (Denmark)

4–4 on aggregate; Basel won 4–1 on penalties.

9 March 2023
18:45 (19:45 UTC+2)

Sheriff Tiraspol (Moldova)	0–1	(France) Nice
	Report	Amraoui 45+3'

Zimbru Stadium, Chișinău
Attendance: 5,326
Referee: Aliyar Aghayev (Azerbaijan)
16 March 2023
21:00

Nice (France)	3–1	(Moldova) Sheriff Tiraspol
Laborde 30'; Moffi 53'; Brahimi 79'	Report	Tapsoba 54'

Allianz Riviera, Nice
Attendance: 23,070
Referee: Lawrence Visser (Belgium)

Nice won 4–1 on aggregate.

9 March 2023
18:45

Anderlecht (Belgium)	1–1	(Spain) Villarreal
Dreyer 57'	Report	Trigueros 28'

Constant Vanden Stock Stadium, Brussels
Attendance: 15,265
Referee: Bartosz Frankowski (Poland)
16 March 2023
21:00

Villarreal (Spain)	0–1	(Belgium) Anderlecht
	Report	Slimani 73'

Estadio de la Cerámica, Villarreal
Attendance: 16,212
Referee: Marco Di Bello (Italy)

Anderlecht won 2–1 on aggregate.

9 March 2023
21:00

Gent (Belgium)	1–1	(Turkey) İstanbul Başakşehir
Orban 35'	Report	Okaka 16'

Ghelamco Arena, Ghent
Attendance: 11,334
Referee: Kristo Tohver (Estonia)
15 March 2023
18:00 (20:00 UTC+3)

İstanbul Başakşehir (Turkey)	1–4	(Belgium) Gent
Januzaj 88'	Report	Orban 31', 32', 34'; Cuypers 37'

Başakşehir Fatih Terim Stadium, Istanbul
Attendance: 8,216
Referee: Benoît Bastien (France)

Gent won 5–2 on aggregate.

== Quarter-finals ==
The draw for the quarter-finals was held on 17 March 2023, 14:00 CET.

=== Summary ===
The first legs were played on 13 April, and the second legs were played on 20 April 2023.

Team 1	Agg.	Team 2	1st leg	2nd leg
Lech Poznań (Poland)	4–6	(Italy) Fiorentina	1–4	3–2
Gent (Belgium)	2–5	(England) West Ham United	1–1	1–4
Anderlecht (Belgium)	2–2 (1–4 p) (Note: Order of legs reversed after original draw.)	(Netherlands) AZ	2–0	0–2 (a.e.t.)
Basel (Switzerland)	4–3	(France) Nice	2–2	2–1 (a.e.t.)

=== Matches ===
13 April 2023
21:00

Lech Poznań (Poland)	1–4	(Italy) Fiorentina
Velde 20'	Report	Cabral 4'; González 41'; Bonaventura 58'; Ikoné 63'

Stadion Poznań, Poznań
Attendance: 41,609
Referee: Irfan Peljto (Bosnia and Herzegovina)
20 April 2023
18:45

Fiorentina (Italy)	2–3	(Poland) Lech Poznań
Sottil 78'; Castrovilli 90+2'	Report	Sousa 9'; Velde 65' (pen.); Sobiech 69'

Stadio Artemio Franchi, Florence
Attendance: 23,110
Referee: Rade Obrenovič (Slovenia)

Fiorentina won 6–4 on aggregate.

13 April 2023
18:45

Gent (Belgium)	1–1	(England) West Ham United
Cuypers 57'	Report	Ings 45+3'

Ghelamco Arena, Ghent
Attendance: 19,037
Referee: Anastasios Sidiropoulos (Greece)
20 April 2023
21:00 (20:00 UTC+1)

West Ham United (England)	4–1	(Belgium) Gent
Antonio 37', 63'; Paquetá 56' (pen.); Rice 58'	Report	Cuypers 26'

London Stadium, London
Attendance: 53,475
Referee: Orel Grinfeld (Israel)

West Ham United won 5–2 on aggregate.

13 April 2023
21:00

Anderlecht (Belgium)	2–0	(Netherlands) AZ
Murillo 22'; Ashimeru 70'	Report

Constant Vanden Stock Stadium, Brussels
Attendance: 18,157
Referee: Daniel Siebert (Germany)
20 April 2023
18:45

AZ (Netherlands)	2–0 (a.e.t.)	(Belgium) Anderlecht
Pavlidis 5' (pen.), 13'	Report
Penalties
Clasie (penalty scored); Sugawara (penalty scored); Reijnders (penalty scored); Meerdink (penalty scored)	4–1	(penalty missed) Vertonghen; (penalty scored) Kana; (penalty missed) Sardella

AFAS Stadion, Alkmaar
Attendance: 19,500
Referee: Davide Massa (Italy)

2–2 on aggregate; AZ won 4–1 on penalties.

13 April 2023
21:00

Basel (Switzerland)	2–2	(France) Nice
Amdouni 26' (pen.), 71'	Report	Moffi 38', 45+1'

St. Jakob-Park, Basel
Attendance: 21,277
Referee: Glenn Nyberg (Sweden)
20 April 2023
21:00

Nice (France)	1–2 (a.e.t.)	(Switzerland) Basel
Laborde 9'	Report	Augustin 86'; Nuhu 98'

Allianz Riviera, Nice
Attendance: 29,716
Referee: Serdar Gözübüyük (Netherlands)

Basel won 4–3 on aggregate.

== Semi-finals ==
The draw for the semi-finals was held on 17 March 2023, 14:00 CET, after the quarter-final draw.

=== Summary ===
The first legs were played on 11 May, and the second legs were played on 18 May 2023.

Team 1	Agg.	Team 2	1st leg	2nd leg
Fiorentina (Italy)	4–3	(Switzerland) Basel	1–2	3–1 (a.e.t.)
West Ham United (England)	3–1	(Netherlands) AZ	2–1	1–0

=== Matches ===
11 May 2023
21:00

Fiorentina (Italy)	1–2	(Switzerland) Basel
Cabral 25'	Report	Diouf 71'; Amdouni 90+3'

Stadio Artemio Franchi, Florence
Attendance: 34,276
Referee: François Letexier (France)
18 May 2023
21:00

Basel (Switzerland)	1–3 (a.e.t.)	(Italy) Fiorentina
Amdouni 55'	Report	González 35', 72'; Barák 120+10'

St. Jakob-Park, Basel
Attendance: 36,000
Referee: José María Sánchez Martínez (Spain)

Fiorentina won 4–3 on aggregate.

11 May 2023
21:00 (20:00 UTC+1)

West Ham United (England)	2–1	(Netherlands) AZ
Benrahma 67' (pen.); Antonio 76'	Report	Reijnders 41'

London Stadium, London
Attendance: 59,412
Referee: Halil Umut Meler (Turkey)
18 May 2023
21:00

AZ (Netherlands)	0–1	(England) West Ham United
	Report	Fornals 90+4'

AFAS Stadion, Alkmaar
Attendance: 19,000
Referee: Ivan Kružliak (Slovakia)

West Ham United won 3–1 on aggregate.

== Final ==
The final was played on 7 June 2023 at the Fortuna Arena in Prague. A draw was held on 17 March 2023, after the quarter-final and semi-final draws, to determine the "home" team for administrative purposes.

7 June 2023
21:00

Fiorentina (Italy)	1–2	(England) West Ham United
Bonaventura 67'	Report	Benrahma 62' (pen.); Bowen 90'

Fortuna Arena, Prague
Attendance: 17,363
Referee: Carlos del Cerro Grande (Spain)
