= 2022–23 FC Basel season =

FC Basel
2022–23 season
- Owner: FCB Holding; David Degen
- Club president: Reto Baumgartner
- Head coach: Alexander Frei (until 7 February); Heiko Vogel (from 7 February)
- Ground: St. Jakob-Park
- Swiss Super League: 5th
- Swiss Cup: Quarter-finals
- UEFA Europa Conference League: Semi-finals
- Top goalscorer: League: Zeki Amdouni (12); All: Zeki Amdouni (22)
Home colours	Away colours	Third colours

The 2022–23 season was FC Basel's 129th season in their existence and the club's 28th consecutive season in the top flight of Swiss football since their promotion in the 1993–94 season.

The 2022–23 Swiss Super League season started on 16th July 2022 and ended on 29 May 2023. In addition to the Swiss Super League, Basel also participated in this season's edition of the Swiss Cup, reaching the semi-finals. Basel also qualified for the second edition of the UEFA Europa Conference League, beginning play in the second qualifying round and qualifying for the group stage, which they advanced from, eventually reaching the semi-finals of the competition before being knocked out 4–3 on aggregate by Fiorentina.

== Club ==
=== FC Basel Holding AG ===
The FC Basel Holding AG owns 75% of FC Basel 1893 AG and the other 25% is owned by the club FC Basel 1893 members. The club FC Basel 1893 functions as a base club independent of the holding company and the AG. FC Basel 1893 AG is responsible for the operational business of the club, e.g. the 1st team, a large part of the youth department and the back office are affiliated there. All decisions that affect the club FC Basel 1893 are made within the AG.

On 20 June 2022 the AGM of the FC Basel Holding AG and the FC Basel 1893 AG were held and both the boards were confirmed. The Holding AG with following members: David Degen (president), Dan Holzmann, Ursula Rey-Krayer and Andreas Rey (vice-president). FC Basel 1893 AG with following members: David Degen (president), Carol Etter (delegate of the club FC Basel), Dan Holzmann, Ursula Rey-Krayer and Andreas Rey (vice-president).

=== Club management ===
The club AGM tool place on 23 May 2022 and the board of directors of the club were all confirmed and are:

Club chairman	(Switzerland) Reto Baumgartner
Director	(Switzerland) Dominik Donzé
Director	(Switzerland) Benno Kaiser
Director	(Switzerland) Carol Etter
Director	(Switzerland) Edward Turner
Director	(Switzerland) Tobias Adler
Ground (capacity and dimensions)	St. Jakob-Park (38,512 (37,500 for international matches) / 120x80 m)

Updated to match played 23 May 2022
Source: FCB Official Site

=== Team management ===
On 23 May 2022 the club announced that Alexander Frei had been signed a contract that made him head coach of the new FCB first team. On 30 May they announced that Frei had brought his assistant Davide Callà from Winterthur with him. On 10 June the club announced that the coaching staff had been completed and that Martin Andermatt had been signed as assistant coach and Björn Rekelhof had signed as athletics and Gabriel Wüthrich as goalkeeper coach. Wüthrich replaced Massimo Colomba, who had been team goalkeeper from 2009 until 2012 and then became coach.

On 28 November 2022, FCB announced that they had taken Heiko Vogel under contract as their new sporting director, as per 1 January 2023.

On 7 February 2023, it was announced that Frei had been removed from his position as head coach and that sporting director Heiko Vogel would take over his duties ad interim.

Position	Staff
Manager	(Switzerland) Alexander Frei until 7 February 2023
Manager	(Germany) Heiko Vogel (interim)
Assistant coach	(Switzerland) Martin Andermatt
Assistant coach	(Switzerland) Davide Callà
Athletics coach	(Switzerland) Bjorn Rekelhof
Goalkeeper coach	(Switzerland) Gabriel Wüthrich
Youth Team U-21 coach	(Switzerland) Ognjen Zaric
Youth Team U-21 co-coach	(Switzerland) Erkan Aktas
Youth Team U-21 co-coach	(Switzerland) Michaël Bauch

Source: FCB Official Site

== Overview ==
=== Off and pre-season ===
During the off-season a number of players left the team. The loan contracts of 5 youngsters came to an end, these being Gonçalo Cardoso, Sebastiano Esposito, Tomás Tavares, Albian Hajdari and Joelson Fernandes and they returned to their clubs of origin. The contracts with Pajtim Kasami and Andrea Padula were not renewed. Raoul Petretta decided himself not to renew his contract and he became free agent. Petretta had started his youth football with Basel in 2005. He played in all their U-teams and advanced to their first team in 2017. Here, between the years 2017 and 2022 Petretta played a total of 199 games for Basel scoring a total of 11 goals. 109 of these games were in the Nationalliga A, 13 in the Swiss Cup, 30 in the UEFA competitions (Champions League, Europa League and Conference League and 47 were friendly games. He scored 7 goals in the domestic league, 1 in the Cup, 2 in Europa and the other was scored during the test games.

Valentin Stocker ended his active career. During his time with the club Stocker won the Swiss championship six times and the Swiss Cup four times. Between the years 2007 and 2014 and again from 2018 to 2022 he played a total of 515 games for Basel scoring a total of 116 goals. 286 of these games were in the Swiss Super League, 33 in the Swiss Cup, 57 in the UEFA competitions (Champions League, Europa League and Conference League and 99 were friendly games. He scored 74 goal in the domestic league, 9 in the Cup and 18 in the European competitions, the other 15 were scored during the test games.

In the other direction, on 20 May FCB announced that the ex-international goalkeeper Marwin Hitz had signed in from Borussia Dortmund on a three-year contract. Another player who signed in from BVB was Bradley Fink. The youngster had played for their reserve team and he signed in on a four-year contract. Four players came in on loan contracts. Two for Basel interesting loan signings were the Swiss international players Zeki Amdouni from Lausanne-Sport and Andi Zeqiri from Brighton and Hove Albion. The other two were Kasim Nuhu from Hoffenheim and Andy Diouf from Rennes On 18 June FCB announced that they had signed Jean-Kévin Augustin| from FC Nantes in a three-year deal.

The team had five pre-season test games, two of which were against Xamax and these were both played in the Youth Campus Basel. The first was won the second was drawn. Two games were played in the training camp, against SpVgg Greuther Fürth and Botoșani and both were won. One game was played in St. Jakob-Park, against Hamburger SV, and this ended with a high defeat. Because the new head coach Alexander Frei changed the formation in each game, mostly substituting all 11 players during the break, all players received playing time, but to the spectators, it seemed that the team hadn't found their form.

== Players ==
=== First-team squad ===
The following is the list of the Basel first team squad. It also includes players that were in the squad the day the season started on 16 July 2022, but subsequently left the club after that date.

Note: Flags indicate national team as defined under FIFA eligibility rules; some limited exceptions apply. Players may hold more than one non-FIFA nationality.

No.	Pos.	Nation	Player
1	GK	SUI	Marwin Hitz
3	DF	GER	Noah Katterbach (on loan from Köln)
4	DF	ESP	Arnau Comas
5	DF	SUI	Michael Lang
6	DF	BFA	Nasser Djiga
7	FW	CAN	Liam Millar
8	MF	FRA	Andy Diouf (on loan from Rennes)
9	FW	SUI	Zeki Amdouni (on loan from Lausanne-Sport)
10	FW	FRA	Jean-Kévin Augustin
11	FW	HUN	Ádám Szalai
13	GK	SUI	Mirko Salvi
14	FW	SUI	Bradley Fink
15	DF	GHA	Kasim Nuhu (on loan from Hoffenheim)
16	GK	SUI	Nils de Mol
17	FW	SUI	Andi Zeqiri (on loan from Brighton and Hove Albion)
18	MF	GHA	Emmanuel Essiam

No.	Pos.	Nation	Player
19	MF	SUI	Darian Males (on loan from Inter Milan)
20	MF	SUI	Fabian Frei (captain)
21	DF	FRA	Andy Pelmard
22	DF	GER	Sergio López
23	MF	NED	Wouter Burger
24	FW	SUI	Tician Tushi
26	FW	SEN	Kaly Sène
27	MF	SUI	Dan Ndoye (on loan from Nice)
28	DF	FRA	Hugo Vogel
29	MF	GER	Adriano Onyegbule
30	FW	GER	Anton Kade
33	DF	ITA	Riccardo Calafiori
34	MF	ALB	Taulant Xhaka (vice-captain)
40	MF	SUI	Liam Chipperfield
42	MF	TUN	Sayfallah Ltaief
72	MF	SUI	Andrea Padula
96	MF	POR	Joelson Fernandes (on loan from Sporting)

=== Players out on loan ===
Note: Flags indicate national team as defined under FIFA eligibility rules; some limited exceptions apply. Players may hold more than one non-FIFA nationality.

No.	Pos.	Nation	Player
—	GK	GER	Felix Gebhardt (at Hallescher FC until 30 June 2023)
—	GK	SUI	Tim Spycher (at Yverdon-Sport until 30 June 2023)
—	DF	BFA	Nasser Djiga (at Nimes until 30 June 2023)
—	MF	TUN	Sayfallah Ltaief (at FC Winterthur until 30 June 2023)

No.	Pos.	Nation	Player
—	FW	SUI	Carmine Chiappetta (at Winterthur until 30 June 2023)
—	FW	SUI	Andrin Hunziker (at Aarau until 30 June 2023)
—	FW	SUI	Tician Tushi (at Xamax until 30 June 2023)

=== Transfers summer 2022 ===
In

Note: Flags indicate national team as defined under FIFA eligibility rules; some limited exceptions apply. Players may hold more than one non-FIFA nationality.

No.	Pos.	Nation	Player
1	GK	SUI	Marwin Hitz (from Borussia Dortmund)
4	DF	ESP	Arnau Comas (from FC Barcelona)
8	MF	FRA	Andy Diouf (on loan from Rennes)
9	FW	SUI	Zeki Amdouni (on loan from Lausanne-Sport)
10	FW	FRA	Jean-Kévin Augustin (from FC Nantes)
13	GK	SUI	Mirko Salvi (from Yverdon-Sport)

No.	Pos.	Nation	Player
14	FW	SUI	Bradley Fink (from Borussia Dortmund II)
15	DF	GHA	Kasim Nuhu (on loan from Hoffenheim)
17	FW	SUI	Andi Zeqiri (on loan from Brighton and Hove Albion)
26	FW	SEN	Kaly Sene (return from loan to Grasshopper Club)
28	DF	FRA	Hugo Vogel (from Olympique Lyonnais)
33	DF	ITA	Riccardo Calafiori (from Roma)
42	MF	TUN	Sayfallah Ltaief (from FC Winterthur)

Out

Note: Flags indicate national team as defined under FIFA eligibility rules; some limited exceptions apply. Players may hold more than one non-FIFA nationality.

No.	Pos.	Nation	Player
1	GK	AUT	Heinz Lindner (to Sion)
3	DF	POR	Gonçalo Cardoso (end of loan from West Ham)
6	DF	BFA	Nasser Djiga (on loan to Nîmes Olympique)
7	MF	SUI	Pajtim Kasami (end of contract)
9	FW	ITA	Sebastiano Esposito (end of loan from Inter Milan)
13	GK	SRB	Đorđe Nikolić (to Újpest Budapest)
14	MF	SUI	Valentin Stocker (end of active playing career)

No.	Pos.	Nation	Player
28	DF	ITA	Raoul Petretta (end of contract)
30	DF	POR	Tomás Tavares (end of loan from Benfica)
35	MF	ARG	Matías Palacios (to Al Ain)
46	GK	GER	Felix Gebhardt (out on loan at Hallescher FC)
49	DF	SUI	Louis Lurvink (on loan at Schaffhausen)
72	MF	SUI	Andrea Padula (end of contract)
76	DF	SUI	Albian Hajdari (end of loan from Juventus U23)
96	MF	POR	Joelson Fernandes (end of loan from Sporting)

== Results and fixtures ==
Kickoff times are in CET.

=== Legend ===
Win Draw Loss Postponed

=== Friendly matches ===
==== Pre-season ====
18 June 2022 Friendly	Basel	3–0	Xamax	Youth Campus Basel, Münchenstein
16:30	Krasniqi 11'; Onyegbule 43'; Sene 56'	FCB report	(yellow card) 39' Bakayoko; (yellow card) 60' Fazlić	Attendance: 400; Referee: (Switzerland) Tobias Thies

25 June 2022 Friendly	Basel	3–2	SpVgg Greuther Fürth	Sportplatz Gmund-Dürnbach, Gmund am Tegernsee
16:00	Ndoye 48'; Chalov 66'; Ndoye 70'	FCB report	64' Angleberger; 85' Ache	Attendance: 250

30 June 2022 Friendly	Basel	3–1	Botoșani	Sportplatz Kematen, Kematen in Tirol
16:00	Amdouni 10'; Lang 59'; Szalai 86'	FCB report	(yellow card) 57' Petkovski; (yellow card) 85' Marku; 78' Mateus	Attendance: 200; Referee: (Austria) Emanuel Barsan

9 July 2022 Friendly	Basel	1–5	Hamburger SV	St. Jakob-Park, Basel
15:30	Amdouni 10' (pen.)	FCB report	14' (pen.) Bénes; 19' Reis; 30' Glatzel; 66' Amaechi; 89' Bilbija	Attendance: 4,657; Referee: (Switzerland) Mirel Turkes

10 July 2022 Friendly	Basel	1–1	Xamax	Youth Campus Basel, Münchenstein
15:00	Szalai 13'; Szalai (yellow card) 18'; Palacios (yellow card) 63'; Hunziker (yellow card) 79'	FCB report	(red card) 18' Mujcic; 57' Dakouri	Attendance: 600; Referee: (Switzerland) Tobias Thies

==== Mid-season ====
20 November 2022 Friendly	Basel	0–0	Sandhausen	Youth Campus Basel, Münchenstein
13:30	Pelmard (yellow card) 89'	FCB report	(yellow card) 11' Höhn; (yellow card) 78' Soukou; (yellow card) 79' Trybull; (yellow card) 81' Đumić	Attendance: 350; Referee: (Switzerland) Tobias Thies

3 December 2022 Friendly	Lausanne-Sport	0–1	Basel	Stade de la Tuilière, Lausanne
14:30		FCB report	18' Amdouni	Attendance: 400

9 December 2022 Friendly	Basel	P–P	Waldhof Mannheim	Youth Campus Basel, Münchenstein
		FCB

==== Winter break ====
7 January 2023 Friendly	Basel	2–3	SC Freiburg	Estadio Municipal de La Línea de la Concepción
15:00	Males 72'; Fink 76'	Summary	12' (o.g.) Xhaka; 54' Gregoritsch; 104' Höler
Note: Game played over 4x30 minutes, fair game with no cards

10 January 2023 Friendly	Real Balompédica Linense	P–P	Basel	Estadio Municipal de La Línea de la Concepción
15:00

13 January 2023 Friendly	Basel	0–6	Borussia Dortmund	Marbella Football Center, Marbella
15:00	Adams (yellow card) 48'; Hitz (yellow card) 53'	FCB report BVB report	39' Reus; 49' Malen; 54' (pen.) Bellingham; 81' (pen.), 86', 88' Haller	Attendance: 300; Referee: Juan Antonio Manrique Antequera (Spain)
Note: Game played over 4x30 minutes

=== Swiss Super League ===
The league fixtures were announced on 17 June 2022.

==== First half of season ====
16 July 2022 Round 1	Winterthur	1–1	Basel	Schützenwiese, Winterthur
20:30	Ramizi 3'; Gonçalves (yellow card) 59'; Ramizi (yellow card) 60'; Corbaz (yellow card) 76'	FCB report	(yellow card) 45' Millar; 70' Burger; (yellow card) 74' Djiga; (yellow card) 90+1' Burger; (yellow card) 90+5' Ndoye	Attendance: 8,400; Referee: (Switzerland) Alain Bieri (Solothurn); Assistant referees: (VAR) (Switzerland) Sven Wolfensberger

24 July 2022 Round 2	Basel	1–1	Servette	St. Jakob-Park, Basel
14:15	Ndoye 45+1'; Frei (yellow card) 47'; Adams (yellow card) 84'; Ndoye (yellow card) 90+1'	FCB report	(yellow card) 28' Vouilloz; (yellow card) 32' Clichy; (yellow card) 35' Bedia; (yellow card) 74' Douline; 87' Valls; (yellow card) 90+1' Severin	Attendance: 18,670; Referee: (Switzerland) Alessandro Dudic; Assistant referees: (VAR) (Switzerland) Lionel Tschudi (Neuchâtel)

31 July 2022 Round 3	Luzern	P–P	Basel	Swissporarena, Luzern
16:30		FCB summary

7 August 2022 Round 4	Basel	0–0	Young Boys	St. Jakob-Park, Basel
16:30	Burger (yellow card) 16'; Hitz (yellow card) 63'; Ndoye (yellow card) 90+3'	FCB report	(yellow card) 27' Nsame	Attendance: 26,547; Referee: (Switzerland) Lukas Fähndrich; Assistant referees: (VAR) (Switzerland) Fedayi San

14 August 2022 Round 5	Basel	0–2	Lugano	St. Jakob-Park, Basel
16:30	Xhaka (yellow card) 32'	FCB report	(yellow card) 4' Arigoni; (yellow card) 42' Daprelà; (yellow card) 87' Valenzuela; 90+1' Babic; (yellow card) 90+2' Saipi; 90+4' Mahmoud	Attendance: 19,888; Referee: (Switzerland) Alessandro Dudic; Assistant referees: (VAR) (Switzerland) Alain Bieri (Solothurn)

28 August 2022 Round 6	Zürich	2–4	Basel	Letzigrund, Zürich
16:30	Kryeziu 32'; Avdijaj (yellow card) 35'; Hornschuh (yellow card) 56'; Kryeziu (yellow card) 69'; Džemaili 90+3' (pen.)	FCB report	23' Zeqiri; 53' Amdouni; 57' Zeqiri; 60' Males; (yellow card) 75' Xhaka	Attendance: 19,111; Referee: (Switzerland) Fedayi San (Gebenstorf); Assistant referees: (VAR) (Switzerland) Lukas Fähndrich

3 September 2022 Round 7	Sion	2–1	Basel	Stade Tourbillon, Sion
18:00	Stojilković 17'; Batata (yellow card) 19'; Tramezzani (yellow card) 88'; Sio 89'; Bua (yellow card) 90+2'; Balotelli (yellow card) 90+3'	FCB report	(yellow card) 50' Lang; 55' Burger; (yellow card) 62' Burger; (yellow card) 87' Comas	Attendance: 11,800; Referee: (Switzerland) Lukas Fähndrich; Assistant referees: (VAR) (Switzerland) Stefan Horisberger

11 September 2022 Round 8	Basel	5–1	Grasshopper Club	St. Jakob-Park, Basel
16:30	Ndyoe 3'; Males (yellow card) 13'; Zeqiri 17' (yellow card) 45+1'; Adams (yellow card) 57'; Augustin 59', 68' (pen.); Burger 73'	FCB report SFL summary	31' (pen.) Morandi; (yellow card) 52' Abrashi; (yellow card) 57' Dadashov; (yellow card) 61' (yellow-red card) 72' Seko; (red card) 83' Loosli	Attendance: 26,109; Referee: (Switzerland) Alain Bieri (Solothurn); Assistant referees: (VAR) (Switzerland) Stephan Klossner

1 October 2022 Round 9	Basel	3–2	St. Gallen	St. Jakob-Park, Basel
18:00	Amdouni 15'; Zigi 17' (o.g.); Burger (yellow card) 22'; Comas (yellow card) 79'; Fink 83'; Xhaka (yellow card) 87'; Augustin (yellow card) 90+3'; Lang (yellow card) 90+4'	FCB report	6' Guillemenot; (yellow card) 24' Maglica; (yellow card) 30' Akolo; (yellow card) 33' Schmidt; (red card) 36' Stillhart; (yellow card) 36' Zigi; (yellow card) 38' Görtler; 71' (pen.) Görtler	Attendance: 22,630; Referee: (Switzerland) Sandro Schärer (Buttikon); Assistant referees: (VAR) (Switzerland) Sven Wolfensberger

9 October 2022 Round 10	Lugano	1–0	Basel	Cornaredo, Lugano
16:30	Sabbatini (yellow card) 24'; Mahou 33'; Valenzuela (yellow card) 84'	FCB report	(yellow card) 61' Lang; (yellow card) 62' Amdouni	Attendance: 3,389; Referee: (Switzerland) Lukas Fähndrich; Assistant referees: (VAR) (Switzerland) Alessandro Dudic

16 October 2022 Round 11	Servette	0–0	Basel	Stade de Genève, Geneva
16:30	Douline (yellow card) 80'	FCB report	(yellow card) 9' Calafiori; (yellow card) 9' Augustin; (yellow card) 19' Comas	Attendance: 10,482; Referee: (Switzerland) Urs Schnyder; Assistant referees: (VAR) (Switzerland) Alain Bieri (Solothurn)

20 October 2022 Round 12	Basel	0–0	Zürich	St. Jakob-Park, Basel
20:30	Ndoye (yellow card) 57'; Zeqiri (yellow card) 90+3'	FCB report	(red card) 13' Santini; (yellow card) 45' Boranijašević; (yellow card) 67' Kamberi; (yellow card) 83' Condé; (yellow card) 90+3' Katić	Attendance: 23,241; Referee: (Switzerland) Lukas Fähndrich; Assistant referees: (VAR) (Switzerland) Fedayi San (Gebenstorf)

23 October 2022 Round 13	Basel	3–1	Winterthur	St. Jakob-Park, Basel
14:15	Comas 2' (1:0); Comas 8' (2:0); Comas (yellow card) 23'; Millar (yellow card) 48'; Fink 58' (3:0); Males (yellow card) 67'	FCB report SFL summary	(yellow card) 36' Corbaz; (yellow card) 64' Seiler; 90+1' (3:1) Seiler	Attendance: 22,027; Referee: (Switzerland) Esther Staubli; Assistant referees: (VAR) (Switzerland) Stephan Klossner

30 October 2022 Round 14	Young Boys	3–1	Basel	Stadion Wankdorf, Bern
16:30	Rieder 7'; Elia 23'; Garcia (yellow card) 44'; Rieder (yellow card) 66'; Blum (yellow card) 75'; Sierro 90+3'	FCB report SFL summary	(yellow card) 28' Xhaka; 52' Fink; (yellow card) 60' Millar; (yellow card) 73'; (red card) 88' Lang	Attendance: 31,120; Referee: (Switzerland) Sandro Schärer (Buttikon); Assistant referees: (VAR) (Switzerland) Lionel Tschudi (Neuchâtel)

6 November 2022 Round 15	Basel	0–0	Sion	St. Jakob-Park, Basel
16:30	Burger (yellow card) 45+3'	FCB report	(yellow card) 45' (yellow-red card) 57' Baltazar (Costa); (yellow card) 45+3' Bua; (yellow card) 45+4' Balotelli; (yellow card) 65' Sio; (yellow card) 74' Araz	Attendance: 22,889; Referee: (Switzerland) Alain Bieri (Solothurn); Assistant referees: (VAR) (Switzerland) Fedayi San (Gebenstorf)

9 November 2022 Round 3	Luzern	0–2	Basel	Swissporarena, Luzern
20:30	Simani (yellow card) 3'; Beloko (yellow card) 45+2'; Dorn (yellow card) 83'	FCB report	6' (pen.) Males; (yellow card) 84' Adams; 87' Fink; (yellow card) 88' Calafiori	Attendance: 12,304; Referee: (Switzerland) Fedayi San (Gebenstorf); Assistant referees: (VAR) (Switzerland) Sascha Kever

12 November 2022 Round 16	Grasshopper Club	1–0	Basel	Letzigrund, Zürich
20:30	Ndenge (yellow card) 2'; Dadashov 34'; Herc (yellow card) 39'; Schmid (yellow card) 51'; Schettine (yellow card) 90+4'	FCB report SFL summary	(yellow card) 6' Pelmard; (yellow card) 39' Calafiori; (yellow card) 81' Comas	Attendance: 7,153; Referee: (Switzerland) Alessandro Dudic; Assistant referees: (VAR) (Switzerland) Sandro Schärer

22 January 2023 Round 17	St. Gallen	1–1	Basel	Kybunpark, St. Gallen
16:30	Guillemenot 5'; Guillemenot (yellow card) 6'; Quintillà (yellow card) 38'; Alves (yellow card) 75'	FCB report	(yellow card) 19' Calafiori; 30' Amdouni; (yellow card) 79' López; (yellow card) 89' Frei	Attendance: 19,200; Referee: (Switzerland) Urs Schnyder; Assistant referees: (VAR) (Switzerland) Alessandro Dudic

28 January 2023 Round 18	Basel	2–3	Luzern	St. Jakob-Park, Basel
20:30	Amdouni 17'; Zeqiri 78'; Pelmard (yellow card) 83'	FCB report	(yellow card) 42' Diambou; 60' Schürpf; (yellow card) 65' Dorn; (yellow card) 70' Chader; 74' Jashari; (yellow card) 83' Simani; 89' Kimpioka	Attendance: 19,713; Referee: (Switzerland) Luca Cibelli; Assistant referees: (VAR) (Switzerland) Sandro Schärer (Buttikon)

==== Second half of season ====
4 February 2023 Round 19	Grasshopper Club	1–0	Basel	Letzigrund, Zürich
18:00	Kawabe (yellow card) 21'; Ribeiro (yellow card) 39'; Bolla (yellow card) 66'; Kawabe 90+4'	FCB report SFL summary		Attendance: 5,145; Referee: (Switzerland) Urs Schnyder; Assistant referees: (VAR) (Switzerland) Alessandro Dudic

11 February 2023 Round 20	Basel	3–1	Sion	St. Jakob-Park, Basel
20:30	Zeqiri 36'; Amdouni 61'; Novoa 70'	FCB report	15' Araz; (yellow card) 55' Lavanchy	Attendance: 19,522; Referee: (Switzerland) Fedayi San (Gebenstorf); Assistant referees: (VAR) (Switzerland) Sandro Schärer

19 February 2023 Round 21	Basel	2–2	Servette	St. Jakob-Park, Basel
16:30	Amdouni 51'; Zeqiri 61'; Frei (yellow card) 88' (yellow-red card) 90+7'; Kasim Adams (yellow card) 90+5'	FCB report	Antunes 20'; Rouiller (yellow card) 53'; Mbabu (yellow card) 59'; Cognat (yellow card) 71'; Bedia 90+6' (pen.)	Attendance: 19,443; Referee: (Switzerland) Sandro Schärer (Buttikon); Assistant referees: (VAR) (Switzerland) Sascha Kever

26 February 2023 Round 22	Lugano	2–2	Basel	Cornaredo, Lugano
16:30	Celar 33'; Aliseda 38'; Hajrizi (yellow card) 90+2'; Hajdari (yellow card) 90+4'	FCB report	(yellow card) 4' Vogel; (yellow card) 31' Xhaka; (yellow card) 42' Burger; 74' Males; 83' Lang; (yellow card) 90+3' Lang	Attendance: 3,205; Referee: (Switzerland) Sven Wolfensberger; Assistant referees: (VAR) (Switzerland) Urs Schnyder

4 March 2023 Round 23	Luzern	0–1	Basel	Swissporarena, Luzern
20:30	Loretz (yellow card) 28'; Beka (yellow card) 51'; Simani (yellow card) 67'; Chader (yellow card) 72' (yellow-red card) 77'	FCB report	29' F. Frei; (yellow card) 45' López; (yellow card) 52' Pelmard; (yellow card) 67' Diouf; (yellow card) 75' Burger; (yellow card) 85' Augustin; (yellow card) 90+6' Hitz	Attendance: 13,248; Referee: (Switzerland) Luca Cibelli; Assistant referees: (VAR) (Switzerland) Sven Wolfensberger

12 March 2023 Round 24	Basel	1–1	St. Gallen	St. Jakob-Park, Basel
16:30	Burger (yellow card) 76'; Zeqiri 82'	FCB report	(yellow card) 35' Vallci; 52' Latte Lath; (yellow card) 64' Witzig	Attendance: 22,625; Referee: (Switzerland) Fedayi San (Gebenstorf); Assistant referees: (VAR) (Switzerland) Lionel Tschudi (Neuchâtel)

19 March 2023 Round 25	Young Boys	3–0	Basel	Stadion Wankdorf, Bern
16:30	Lustenberger (yellow card) 57'; Itten 76'; Garcia (yellow card) 78'; Itten 80'; Itten 89'; Zesiger (yellow card) 90+1'	FCB report	(yellow card) 50' Calafiori; (yellow card) 79' Hitz	Attendance: 31,500 (sold out); Referee: (Switzerland) Lukas Fähndrich; Assistant referees: (VAR) (Switzerland) Sandro Schärer

1 April 2023 Round 26	Basel	2–0	Winterthur	St. Jakob-Park, Basel
20:30	Augustin 25'; Xhaka (yellow card) 21'; Diouf (yellow card) 78'; Fink 85'	FCB report	(yellow card) 12' Arnold	Attendance: 19,921; Referee: (Switzerland) Luca Piccolo; Assistant referees: (VAR) (Switzerland) Sascha Kever
Note: Before the match, one minutes silence in honor of the deceased former FCB player Peter Marti

8 April 2023 Round 27	Zürich	1–1	Basel	Letzigrund, Zürich
18:00	Kamberi (yellow card) 23'; Condé 26'; Hodza (yellow card) 82'; Mathew (yellow card) 83'	FCB report SFV summary	19' López; (yellow card) 74' Ndoye	Attendance: 19,451; Referee: (Switzerland) Lukas Fähndrich; Assistant referees: (VAR) (Switzerland) Fedayi San

16 April 2023 Round 28	Basel	1–1	Young Boys	St. Jakob-Park, Basel
16:30	Diouf (yellow card) 57'; Amdouni 68'; Fink (yellow card) 90'	FCB report SFV summary	8' Nsame; (yellow card) 31' Nsame; (yellow card) 51' Ugrinic	Attendance: 14,142; Referee: (Switzerland) Fedayi San (Gebenstorf); Assistant referees: (VAR) (Switzerland) Lukas Fähndrich
Note: The Muttenzerkurve (home fan sector) and the Gellertkurve (guest fan sector) were closed, due to the sanctions imposed following the riots after the cup semi-final match, ten days earlier. A minute of silence before the game in memory of the former FCB player Roberto Frigerio.

23 April 2023 Round 29	Basel	0–2	Luzern	St. Jakob-Park, Basel
14:15	Augustin (yellow card) 31'; Xhaka (yellow card) 62'; Males (yellow card) 79'	FCB report	(yellow card) 18' Beka; (yellow card) 40' Ottiger; (yellow card) 54' Schürpf; 71' Sorgić; 89' Breedijk; (yellow card) 90+5' Frýdek	Attendance: 22,966; Referee: (Switzerland) Sven Wolfensberger; Assistant referees: (VAR) (Switzerland) Sascha Kever

27 April 2023 Round 30	Sion	1–2	Basel	Stade Tourbillon, Sion
20:30	Bua (yellow card) 21'; Sio 45+2'; Batata (yellow card) 56'; Araz (yellow card) 63'	FCB report	17' Zeqiri; 40' Ndoye; (yellow card) 47' Pelmard; (yellow card) 85' López	Attendance: 7,800; Referee: (Switzerland) Lukas Fähndrich; Assistant referees: (VAR) (Switzerland) Sven Wolfensberger

30 April 2023 Round 31	Winterthur	1–4	Basel	Schützenwiese, Winterthur
16:30	Burkart (yellow card) 6'; Ardaiz 21' (pen.); Gelmi (yellow card) 56'; Ramizi (yellow card) 56'	FCB report	7' Adams; 12' Males; (yellow card) 24' Heiko Vogel (coach); (yellow card) 33' Ndoye; (yellow card) 45' Diouf; 71' Amdouni; 83' Zeqiri	Attendance: 8,400 (sold out); Referee: (Switzerland) Fedayi San (Gebenstorf); Assistant referees: (VAR) (Switzerland) Lukas Fähndrich

7 May 2023 Round 32	Basel	0–2	Zürich	St. Jakob-Park, Basel
16:30	Xhaka (yellow card) 56'; Augustin (yellow card) 85'; Adams (red card) 85'; Heiko Vogel (coach) (yellow card) 90'; Burger (red card) 90+7'; Xhaka (red card) 90+12'	FCB report SFL summary	(yellow card) 14' Aliti; (yellow card) 76' Kamberi; (yellow card) 81' Guerrero; (yellow card) 85' Katić; (yellow card) 85' Boranijašević; 90+1' (pen.) Šimić; (yellow card) 90+1' Šimić; 90+4' Mathew; (red card) 90+7' Kryeziu; (yellow card) 90+7' Marchesano	Attendance: 27,295; Referee: (Switzerland) Alessandro Dudic; Assistant referees: (VAR) (Switzerland) Stephan Klossner

14 May 2023 Round 33	St. Gallen	6–1	Basel	Kybunpark, St. Gallen
18:00	Guillemenot 22'; Görtler 24'; Quintillà 36'; Latte Lath 52'; Latte Lath 63'; Geubbels 90+1'; Geubbels (yellow card) 90+2'	FCB report SFL summary	(yellow card) 34' Millar; (yellow card) 45' Males; 54' Zeqiri	Attendance: 18,846; Referee: (Switzerland) Luca Cibelli; Assistant referees: (VAR) (Switzerland) Lionel Tschudi

21 May 2023 Round 34	Basel	1–1	Lugano	St. Jakob-Park, Basel
16:30	Zeqiri 35'; Zeqiri (yellow card) 38'; Males (yellow card) 62'; Calafiori (yellow card) 63' (yellow-red card) 90+4'; F. Frei (yellow card) 90+4'; Heiko Vogel (coach) (yellow card) (yellow-red card) after match'	FCB resport SFL summary	(yellow card) 19' Hajrizi; 84' Steffen; (yellow card) 89' Steffen; (yellow card) 89' Mahou; (yellow card) 90+4' Saipi	Attendance: 21,105; Referee: (Switzerland) Lukas Fähndrich; Assistant referees: (VAR) (Switzerland) Stefan Horisberger

25 May 2023 Round 35	Servette	3–3	Basel	Stade de Genève, Geneva
20:30	Stevanović (yellow card) 23'; Bedia 41'; Pflücke (yellow card) 45+1'; Touati 73'; Stevanović 81'; Crivelli (yellow card) 86'; Touati (yellow card) 90'	SFL summary FCB report	43' Amdouni; (yellow card) 61' Augustin; 69' Burger; 88' Amdouni	Attendance: 12,353; Referee: (Switzerland) Esther Staubli; Assistant referees: (VAR) (Switzerland) Sven Wolfensberger

29 May 2023 Round 36	Basel	3–1	Grasshopper	St. Jakob-Park, Basel
16:30 CEST (UTC+2)	Amdouni 50'; Amdouni 69'; F. Frei (yellow card) 59'; Ndoye 81'	FCB report summary	(yellow card) 26' Ndenge; (yellow card) 57' Loosli; (yellow card) 72' (goal) 90+2' Herc	Attendance: 26,611; Referee: (Switzerland) Sven Wolfensberger; Assistant referees: (VAR) (Switzerland) Esther Staubli

==== Final league table ====
Pos	Team	Pld	W	D	L	GF	GA	GD	Pts	Qualification or relegation
1	Young Boys (C)	36	21	11	4	82	30	+52	74	Qualification for Champions League play-off round
2	Servette	36	14	16	6	53	48	+5	58	Qualification for Champions League second qualifying round
3	Lugano	36	15	12	9	59	47	+12	57	Qualification for Europa League play-off round (Note: As Swiss Cup winners Young Boys qualify for UCL play-off round, the third placed Lugano qualifies for the UEL play-off round. UECL spots are awarded to 4th and 5th ranked teams, Luzern and Basel, respectively.)
4	Luzern	36	13	11	12	56	52	+4	50	Qualification for Europa Conference League second qualifying round
5	Basel	36	11	14	11	51	50	+1	47	Qualification for Europa Conference League second qualifying round
6	St. Gallen	36	11	12	13	66	52	+14	45	
7	Grasshopper	36	12	8	16	56	64	−8	44	
8	Zürich	36	10	14	12	41	55	−14	44	
9	Winterthur	36	8	8	20	32	66	−34	32	
10	Sion (R)	36	7	10	19	41	73	−32	31	Qualification for relegation play-off

Source: Swiss Super League
Rules for classification: 1) Points; 2) Goal difference; 3) Goals scored; 4) Head-to-head goal difference; 5) Away goals scored; 6) Draw.
(C) Champions; (R) Relegated

=== Swiss Cup ===
The matches of the first round were drawn on 5 July 2022 and took place between 19 and 21 August 2022. Home advantage was granted to the team from the lower league

21 August 2022 Round 1	FC Allschwil	0–5	Basel	Stadion Schützenmatte, Basel (Note: Venue moved from Sportplatz Im Brüel due to structural issues.)
16:00	Lomma (yellow card) 11'; Borer (yellow card) 34'	SFV summary FCB report	9', 35', 40' Males; 14' Fink; (yellow card) 42' Katterbach; 73' Szalai	Attendance: 7,500; Referee: (Switzerland) Tobias Thies
Note:

18 September 2022 Round 2	Aarau	1–3 (a.e.t.)	Basel	Stadion Brügglifeld, Aarau
15:30	Fazliu 10'; Njie (yellow card) 90' (yellow-red card) 98'; Conus (yellow card) 42' (red card) 109'	SFV summary FCB report	43' (pen.) Augustin; 94' Lang; 119' Ndoye	Attendance: 8,000; Referee: (Switzerland) Fedayi San (Gebenstorf)

1 February 2023 Round 3	Grasshopper Club Zürich	3–5	Basel	Letzigrund, Zürich
20:15	Seko 31'; Dadashov 52' (pen.); Dadashov (yellow card) 61'; Loosli (yellow card) 71'; Seko 73'; Herc (yellow card) 90'	FCB report SFV summary	29' Kade; 45+2' (pen.) Frei; 48' Amdouni; 63' Adams; (yellow card) 89' Adams; (yellow card) 81' Salvi; 90+3' Amdouni	Attendance: 5,029; Referee: (Switzerland) Lukas Fähndrich

1 March 2023 Quarter-final	FC St. Gallen	1–2 (a.e.t.)	Basel	Kybunpark, St. Gallen
20:15	Guillemenot 10'; Quintillà (yellow card) 49'; Watkowiak (yellow card) 103'; Maglica (yellow card) 106'	FCB report SFV summary	(yellow card) 24' Novoa; 59' Zeqiri; 95' Amdouni; (yellow card) 113' Calafiori	Attendance: 14,950; Referee: (Switzerland) Fedayi San (Gebenstorf)

4 April 2023 Semi-final	Basel	2–4	Young Boys	St. Jakob-Park, Basel
20:15	Hitz (yellow card) 2'; Pelmard (yellow card) 44'; Millar (yellow card) 53'; Males 57'; Ndoye 71'; Ndoye (yellow card) 90+2'	FCB report SFV summary	3' (pen.) Itten; 15' Rieder; (yellow card) 38' Garcia; (yellow card) 44' Lauper; 63' Itten; 68' Elia; (yellow card) 82' Amenda	Attendance: 26,310; Referee: (Switzerland) Urs Schnyder

=== UEFA Europa Conference League ===
==== Second qualifying round ====
The draw for the second qualifying round was made on 15 June 2022.

21 July 2022 First leg	Basel	2–0	(Northern Ireland) Crusaders	St. Jakob-Park, Basel
19:00	Xhaka (yellow card) 32' (yellow-red card) 33'; Ndoye 38'; Szalai 48'	UEFA summary FCB report	(yellow card) 22' Heatley; (yellow card) 32' Larmour	Attendance: 6,058; Referee: Amine Kourgheli (Belarus)

28 July 2022 Second leg	(Northern Ireland) Crusaders	1–1	Basel	Seaview, Belfast
21:00	B. Burns 53'; Hegarty (yellow card) 70'; McMurray (yellow card) 74'; Lowry (yellow card) 85'; Owens (yellow card) 88'; Heatley (yellow card) 90+3'	UEFA summary FCB report	(yellow card) 22' Amdouni; 36' Millar; (yellow card) 74' Pelmard; (yellow card) 86' Szalai	Attendance: 2,425; Referee: David Šmajc (Slovenia)

Basel won 3–1 on aggregate.

==== Third qualifying round ====
4 August 2022 First leg	(Denmark) Brøndby	1–0	Basel	Brøndby Stadium, Brøndbyvester
20:30	Radošević (yellow card) 52'; Divković 74'; Bell (yellow card) 86'	UEFA summary FCB report	(yellow card) 89' Ltaief; (yellow card) 90' Burger	Attendance: 15,015; Referee: Filip Glova (Slovakia)

11 August 2022 Second leg	Basel	2–1 (a.e.t.) (3–1 p)	(Denmark) Brøndby	St. Jakob-Park, Basel
19:00	Adams (yellow card) 21'; Frei 40' (pen.); Hitz (yellow card) 45+2'; Zeqiri 45+5' (yellow card) 107'; Burger (yellow card) 63'; Pelmard (yellow card) 81'	UEFA report FCB report	(yellow card) 12' Cappis; (yellow card) 21' (goal) 45+1' Kvistgaarden; (yellow card) 64' Rosted; (yellow card) 88' Salech; (yellow card) 113' Greve; (yellow card) 119' Bell	Attendance: 20,064; Referee: Christian Dingert (Germany)
	Penalties
	Diouf (penalty scored); Ndoye (penalty scored); Szalai (penalty missed); Males (penalty scored)		(penalty missed) Radošević; (penalty missed) Salech; (penalty scored) Greve; (penalty missed) Bjur

2–2 on aggregate. Basel won 3–1 on penalties.

==== Play-off round ====
18 August 2022 First leg	CSKA Sofia (Bulgaria)	1–0	Basel	Vasil Levski National Stadium, Sofia (Note: CSKA Sofia played their home matches at the Vasil Levski National Stadium, instead of their regular venue, the Stadion Balgarska Armia, which did not meet UEFA requirements.)
19:00 (20:00 EEST)	López 71' (o.g.); Turitsov (yellow card) 73'; Vion (yellow card) 82'	UEFA summary FCB report	(yellow card) 23' Adams; (yellow card) 30' Amdouni; (yellow card) 81' Diouf; (yellow card) 85' López	Attendance: 15,364; Referee: Duje Strukan (Croatia)

25 August 2022 Second leg	Basel	2–0	(Bulgaria) CSKA Sofia	St. Jakob-Park, Basel
19:00	Burger (yellow card) 53'; Frei 66'; Lang 84'; Pelmard (yellow card) 90+3'	UEFA summary FCB report	(yellow card) 4' Mattheij; (yellow card) 45+2' Petrov; (yellow card) 49' Busatto; (yellow card) 53' Vion; (yellow card) 57' Geferson	Attendance: 18,469; Referee: António Nobre (Portugal)

Basel won 2–1 on aggregate.

==== Group stage ====
8 September 2022 Matchday 1	Basel	3–1	(Armenia) Pyunik	St. Jakob-Park, Basel
21:00	Males 23' (pen.); Adams Nuhu (yellow card) 51'; Burger 54', 76'	FCB report UEFA summary	(yellow card) 13' Bratkov; (yellow card) 22' Miljković; 27' Dashyan; (yellow card) 55' Harutyunyan	Attendance: 11,860; Referee: Juan Martínez Munuera (Spain)

15 September 2022 Matchday 2	Žalgiris (Lithuania)	0–1	Basel	LFF Stadium, Vilnius
18:45	Kyeremeh (yellow card) 37'; Mamić (yellow card) 63'; Gorobsov (yellow card) 65'; Ljubisavljević (yellow card) 68'	FCB report UEFA summary	(yellow card) 58' Comas; 62' Zeqiri; (yellow card) 90+2' Burger	Attendance: 4,821; Referee: Iwan Griffith (Wales)

6 October 2022 Matchday 3	Basel	0–2	(Slovakia) Slovan Bratislava	St. Jakob-Park, Basel
21:00	Males (yellow card) 26'; Diouf (yellow card) 30'; Comas (yellow card) 62'; Adams (yellow card) 72' (yellow-red card) 90+5'	FCB report UEFA summary	(yellow card) 20' Čavrić; 35' Pauschek; 45+1' Čavrić; (yellow card) 45+2' Kankava; (yellow card) 65' Šaponjić	Attendance: 14,870; Referee: Kevin Clancy (Scotland)

13 October 2022 Matchday 4	Slovan Bratislava (Slovakia)	3–3	Basel	Tehelné pole, Bratislava
18:45	Weiss 45+2' (pen.); Kucka 49'; Čavrić 53'	FCB report UEFA summary	29' (pen.) Males; (yellow card) 30' Fink; (yellow card) 44' Burger; 65' Diouf; (yellow card) 67' Lang; 72' Zeqiri; (yellow card) 78' Zeqiri	Attendance: 20,233; Referee: Serhiy Boyko (Ukraine)

27 October 2022 Matchday 5	Basel	2–2	(Lithuania) Žalgiris	St. Jakob-Park, Basel
21:00	Diouf 1'; Zeqiri 17'; Xhaka (yellow card) 84'; Burger (yellow card) 89'	FCB report UEFA summary	42', 62' Oyewusi	Attendance: 13,236; Referee: Ali Palabıyık (Turkey)

3 November 2022 Matchday 6	Pyunik (Armenia)	1–2	Basel	Vazgen Sargsyan Republican Stadium, Yerevan
18:45	Harutyunyan (yellow card) 56'; Yegishe Melikyan (coach) (yellow card) 59'; Juričić 71'	FCB report UEFA summary	(yellow card) 14' (yellow-red card) 53' Ndoye; 17' Males; 29' Kade; (yellow card) 62' Calafiori; (yellow card) 68' Alexander Frei (coach); (yellow card) 80' Males	Attendance: 9,967; Referee: Horațiu Feșnic (Romania)

Group table

Pos	Team	Pld	W	D	L	GF	GA	GD	Pts	Qualification	SLO	BSL	PYU	ZAL
1	(Slovakia) Slovan Bratislava	6	3	2	1	9	7	+2	11 (Note: Head-to-head points: Slovan Bratislava 4, Basel 1.)	Advance to round of 16	—	3–3	2–1	0–0
2	(Switzerland) Basel	6	3	2	1	11	9	+2	11	Advance to knockout round play-offs	0–2	—	3–1	2–2
3	(Armenia) Pyunik	6	2	0	4	8	9	−1	6		2–0	1–2	—	2–0
4	(Lithuania) Žalgiris	6	1	2	3	5	8	−3	5		1–2	0–1	2–1	—

Source: UEFA
Rules for classification: Group stage tiebreakers

==== Knockout round play-offs ====
16 February 2023 First leg	Trabzonspor (Turkey)	1–0	(Switzerland) Basel	Şenol Güneş Sports Complex, Trabzon
18:45 (20:45 TRT)	Siopis (yellow card) 38'; Stryger Larsen 65'	FCB report UEFA summary		Attendance: 26,184; Referee: Donatas Rumšas (Lithuania)

23 February 2023 Second leg	Basel (Switzerland)	2–0 (2–1 agg.)	(Turkey) Trabzonspor	St. Jakob-Park, Basel
21:00	Amdouni 13'; Hitz (yellow card) 49'; Xhaka (yellow card) 59'; Zeqiri 76'; Males (yellow card) 80'; Zeqiri (yellow card) 81'; Ndoye (yellow card) 88'	FCB report UEFA summary	(yellow card) 15' Haspolat; (penalty missed) 27' Bakasetas; (yellow card) 29' Larsen	Attendance: 24,428; Referee: Antonio Mateu Lahoz (Spain)

Basel won 2–1 on aggregate.

==== Round of 16 ====
9 March 2023 First leg	Basel (Switzerland)	2–2	(Slovakia) Slovan Bratislava	St. Jakob-Park, Basel
21:00	Amdouni 6'; Zeqiri 40'; López (yellow card) 90+5'; Hitz (yellow card) 90+5'	FCB report UEFA summary	17' Medveděv; (yellow card) 45+3' Vladimír Weiss Jr. (yellow card) 63' Lichý; 70' Abubakari; (yellow card) 75' Kashia	Attendance: 13,202; Referee: Rade Obrenović (Slovenia)

16 March 2023 Second leg	Slovan Bratislava (Slovakia)	2–2 (a.e.t.) (4–4 agg.) (1–4 p)	(Switzerland) Basel	Tehelné pole, Bratislava
18:45	Abubakari 10'; Kucka 17'; De Marco (yellow card) 46'; Lovat (yellow card) 86'	FCB report UEFA summary	53' Calafiori; (yellow card) 85' Zeqiri; 90+3' Amdouni; (yellow card) 104' Calafiori	Attendance: 21,675; Referee: Jakob Kehlet (Denmark)
	Penalties
	Kucka (penalty missed); Barseghyan (penalty missed); Lovat (penalty scored)		(penalty scored) Diouf; (penalty scored) Amdouni; (penalty scored) Calafiori; (penalty scored) Males

4–4 on aggregate. Basel won 4–1 on penalties.

==== Quarter-finals ====
13 April 2023 First leg	Basel (Switzerland)	2–2	(France) Nice	St. Jakob-Park, Basel
21:00	Amdouni 26' (pen.); Amdouni 71'; López (yellow card) 79'	FCB report UEFA summary	(yellow card) 17' Amraoui; (yellow card) 24' Todibo; Moffi 38'; Moffi 45+1'	Attendance: 21,277; Referee: Glenn Nyberg (Sweden)

20 April 2023 Second leg	Nice (France)	1–2 (a.e.t.) (3–4 agg.)	(Switzerland) Basel	Allianz Riviera, Nice
21:00	Laborde 10'; Dante (yellow card) 38'; Boudaoui (yellow card) 56'; Bard (yellow card) 59'; Ramsey (yellow card) 90+4'; Pépé (yellow card) 90+5'; Thuram (yellow card) 105+1'	UEFA summary	Ndoye (yellow card) 32'; Augustin 86'; Nuhu 99'; Lang (yellow card) 116'	Attendance: 29,716; Referee: Serdar Gözübüyük (Netherlands)

Basel won 4–3 on aggregate.

==== Semi-finals ====
11 May 2023 First leg	Fiorentina (Italy)	1–2	(Switzerland) Basel	Florence, Italy
21:00 CEST (UTC+2)	Cabral 25'	Report	Kasim (yellow card) 59'; Diouf 71'; Burger (yellow card) 72'; Ndoye (yellow card) 79'; Amdouni 90+3'	Stadium: Stadio Artemio Franchi; Attendance: 34,276; Referee: François Letexier (France)

18 May 2023 Second leg	Basel (Switzerland)	1–3 (a.e.t.) (3–4 agg.)	(Italy) Fiorentina	Basel, Switzerland
21:00 CEST (UTC+2)	Amdouni 55'; Burger (yellow card) 89'	Report	Igor (yellow card) 21'; González 35', 72', (yellow card) 90'; Ranieri (yellow card) 59'; Ikoné (yellow card) 95'; Bonaventura (yellow card) 104'; Barák 120+10', (yellow card) 120+10'	Stadium: St. Jakob-Park; Attendance: 36,000; Referee: José María Sánchez Martínez (Spain)

== See also ==
- History of FC Basel
- List of FC Basel players
- List of FC Basel seasons

== Sources ==
- FCB squad 2022–23 at fcb-archiv.ch
- Switzerland 2022–22 at RSSSF
