= Andy Pelmard =

Malagasy footballer (born 2000)

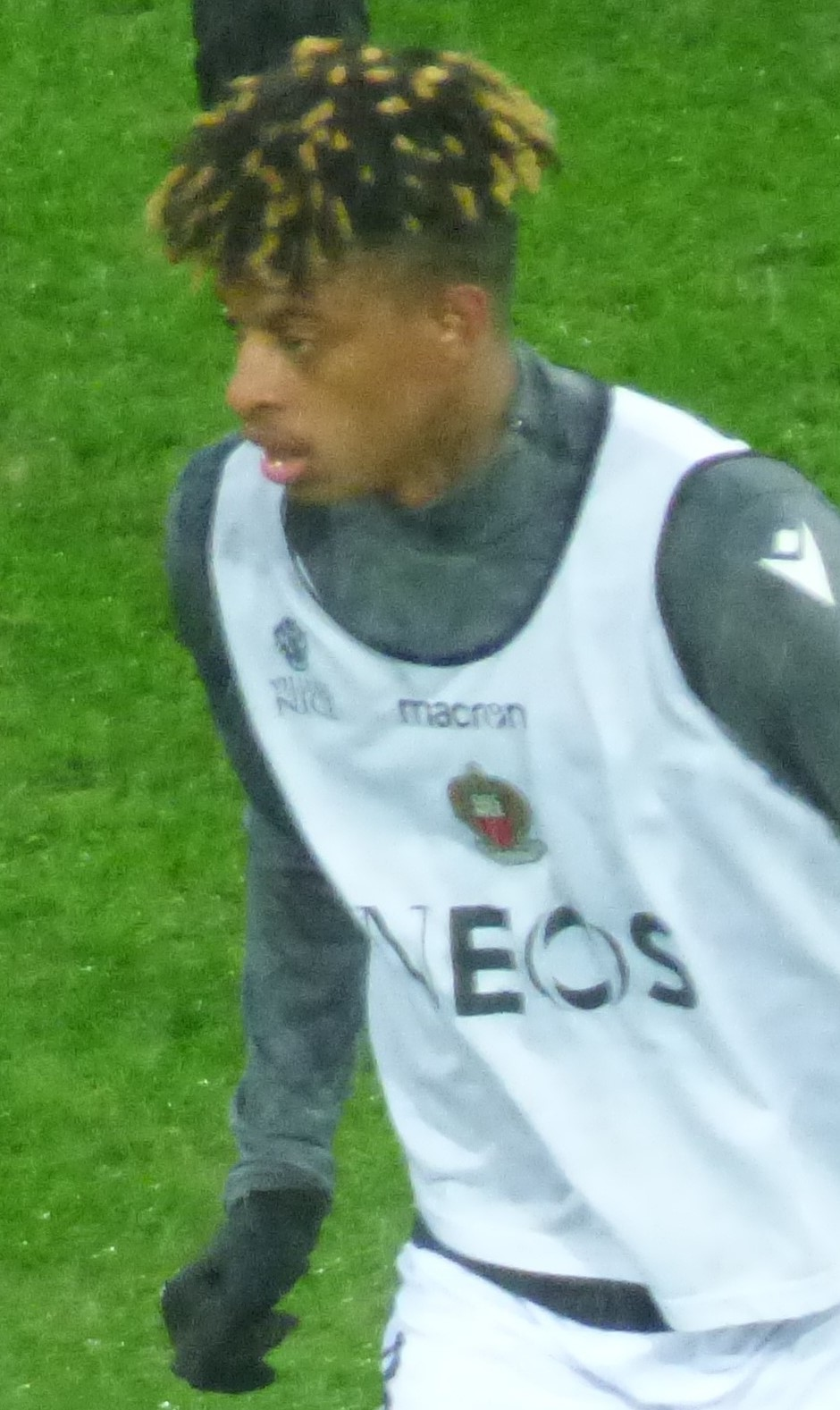
- Pelmard with Nice in 2021

Personal information
- Full name: Andy Joseph Pelmard
- Date of birth: 12 March 2000 (age 26)
- Place of birth: Nice, France
- Height: 1.80 m (5 ft 11 in)
- Position: Centre-back

Team information
- Current team: Clermont

Youth career
- 2007–2011: ASBTP
- 2011–2013: ESS Nice
- 2013–2019: Nice

Senior career*
Years	Team	Apps	(Gls)
2017–2020	Nice II	37	(0)
2019–2022	Nice	33	(0)
2021–2022	→ Basel (loan)	33	(0)
2022–2023	Basel	34	(0)
2023–	Clermont	37	(0)
2024	→ Lecce (loan)	3	(0)
2025	→ Las Palmas (loan)	4	(0)
2025–2026	→ Jagiellonia Białystok (loan)	18	(0)

International career^{‡}
2017	France U17	6	(0)
2017–2018	France U18	8	(0)
2019	France U20	1	(0)
2019	France U21	2	(0)
2025–	Madagascar	3	(0)
- * Club domestic league appearances and goals as of 20:03, 29 May 2026 (UTC) ‡ National team caps and goals as of 11:20, 13 October 2025 (UTC)

Andy Joseph Pelmard (born 12 March 2000) is a professional footballer who plays as a centre-back for Ligue 2 club Clermont. Born in France, he plays for the Madagascar national team.

== Club career ==
=== Nice ===
Pelmard made his professional debut with Nice in a 1–0 Ligue 1 loss to Amiens on 23 February 2019.

=== Basel ===
On 1 July 2021, Pelmard joined Basel's first team for their 2021–22 season under head coach Patrick Rahmen on a one-year loan. Pelmard played his debut for his new club in the second qualifying round of the 2021–22 UEFA Europa Conference League, a home game in the St. Jakob-Park on 22 July 2021 as Basel won 3–0 against Partizani Tirana. Three days later, on 25 July, he played his domestic league debut for the club in the away game in the Letzigrund, Zürich, as Basel won 2–0 against Grasshopper Club. In that season Pelmard played 33 of the team's 36 league matches, missing two due to injury and one due to a suspension. On 4 February 2022, Basel exercised the purchase option in their loan contract and signed Pelmard on a definite basis with a three-and-a-half-year contract until the summer of 2025.

In Basel's 2022–23 season, under new head coach Alexander Frei and later Heiko Vogel, Pelmard was again a regular in the starting eleven, playing 34 of the 36 league games. In the 2022–23 UEFA Europa Conference League Basel advanced as far as the semi-finals, but here they were defeated by Fiorentina. Nevertheless, the player decided to move on. During his time with the club, Pelmard played a total of 116 games for Basel without scoring a goal. 67 of these games were in the Swiss Super League, six in the Swiss Cup, 32 in the UEFA Conference League and 11 were friendly games.

=== Clermont ===
On 12 July 2023, Pelmard returned to France to sign for Ligue 1 club Clermont on a four-year deal.

==== Loan to Lecce ====
On 14 August 2024, Pelmard was loaned to Lecce in Italy. In December that year, he was fined and had his driver's license suspended after driving the wrong way in the city and testing positive for alcohol following the club's Christmas dinner. The club condemned his actions, excluded him from the first team, in addition to further disciplinary measures.

==== Loan to Las Palmas ====
After his loan at Lecce was cut short, Pelmard joined La Liga club Las Palmas in January 2025 on a loan with an option to buy.

==== Loan to Jagiellonia Białystok ====
On 8 September 2025, Pelmard moved on loan to Polish club Jagiellonia Białystok with an option to make the move permanent.

== International career ==
Born in France, Pelmard is of Guadeloupean descent through his father and Malagasy descent through his mother. Pelmard is a youth international for France, having represented the France U17s at the 2017 U17 Euros and the 2017 FIFA U-17 World Cup.

He was called up to the Madagascar national team for a set of 2026 FIFA World Cup qualification matches in September 2025.

== Career statistics ==
As of match played 10 April 2026

Appearances and goals by club, season and competition
Club	Season	League			National cup (Note: Includes Coupe de France, Swiss Cup, Coppa Italia, Polish Cup)		Other		Total	
Club	Season	Division	Apps	Goals	Apps	Goals	Apps	Goals	Apps	Goals
Nice B	2017–18	National 2	16	0	—		—		16	0
Nice B	2018–19	National 2	18	0	—		—		18	0
Nice B	2019–20	National 3	3	0	—		—		3	0
Nice B	Total		37	0	—		—		37	0
Nice	2018–19	Ligue 1	4	0	0	0	0	0	4	0
Nice	2019–20	Ligue 1	10	0	1	0	0	0	11	0
Nice	2020–21	Ligue 1	19	0	1	0	4 (Note: Appearances in UEFA Europa League)	0	24	0
Nice	Total		33	0	2	0	4	0	39	0
Basel	2021–22	Swiss Super League	33	0	1	0	13 (Note: Appearances in UEFA Conference League)	0	47	0
Basel	2022–23	Swiss Super League	34	0	5	0	19	0	58	0
Basel	Total		67	0	6	0	32	0	105	0
Clermont	2023–24	Ligue 1	34	0	2	0	—		36	0
Clermont	2025–26	Ligue 2	3	0	—		—		3	0
Clermont	Total		37	0	2	0	—		39	0
Lecce (loan)	2024–25	Serie A	3	0	1	0	—		4	0
Las Palmas (loan)	2024–25	La Liga	4	0	—		—		4	0
Jagiellonia Białystok (loan)	2025–26	Ekstraklasa	18	0	2	0	2	0	22	0
Career total			199	0	13	0	38	0	250	0

=== International ===
As of match played 12 October 2025

Appearances and goals by national team and year
National team	Year	Apps	Goals
Madagascar
Madagascar	2025	3	0
Total		3	0
