= Bradley Fink =

Swiss footballer (born 2003)

Personal information
- Full name: Bradley Thomas Fink
- Date of birth: 17 April 2003 (age 23)
- Place of birth: Cham, Switzerland
- Height: 1.92 m (6 ft 4 in)
- Position: Striker

Team information
- Current team: Dundee (on loan from Wycombe Wanderers)
- Number: 21

Youth career
- 2010–2011: SC Cham
- 2011–2019: Luzern
- 2019–2022: Borussia Dortmund

Senior career*
Years	Team	Apps	(Gls)
2022	Borussia Dortmund II	14	(3)
2022–2025	Basel	41	(6)
2023–2024	→ Grasshopper (loan)	31	(2)
2025–	Wycombe Wanderers	23	(1)
2026–	→ Dundee (loan)	11	(4)

International career^{‡}
2017–2018	Switzerland U15	7	(4)
2018–2019	Switzerland U16	8	(1)
2019	Switzerland U17	7	(7)
2021	Switzerland U19	7	(5)
2022	Switzerland U20	1	(1)
2022–2024	Switzerland U21	13	(2)
- * Club domestic league appearances and goals as of 21 November 2026 ‡ National team caps and goals as of 09:28, 31 July 2024 (UTC)

Bradley Thomas Fink (born 17 April 2003) is a Swiss professional footballer who plays as a striker for Scottish Premiership club Dundee, on loan from EFL League One club Wycombe Wanderers.

== Club career ==
=== Early career ===
Born in Cham, Fink played his first youth football with local club SC Cham. He was soon discovered by Luzern and moved on to them soon afterwards and passed through their youth academy. In July 2019, Fink joined Borussia Dortmund. On 17 January 2022, Fink made his professional debut in a 3. Liga match for Borussia Dortmund II against Waldhof Mannheim.

=== FC Basel ===
In August 2022, Fink signed a four-year contract with FC Basel. He joined Basel's first team for their 2022–23 season under head coach Alexander Frei and made his debut in the Swiss Cup match on 21 August 2022. He scored his first goal for the club in the same game, as Basel won 5–0 against local amateur club FC Allschwil.

Fink played his domestic league debut for the club in the away game in the Letzigrund on 28 August as Basel won 4–2 against Zürich. He scored his first league goal for his new club in the home game in the St. Jakob-Park on 1 October. He was substituted in for Wouter Burger in the 83rd minute and scored the winning goal within one minute as Basel won 3–2 against St. Gallen, heading home a cross from Michael Lang.

==== Loan to Grasshopper Club Zürich ====
On 20 July 2023, he joined Swiss Super League rivals Grasshopper Club Zürich for a season long loan. He made his debut in the first game of the season on 22 July 2023, coming on in the final minutes in the 1–3 home defeat to Servette FC. On 12 August 2023, he received his first starting lineup nomination and scored his first goal for Grasshoppers just seven minutes into the game. In their Swiss Cup opening round match against SV Schaffhausen of the 2. Liga Interregional, the 5th tier of Swiss football, he scored a brace in the 4–0 away victory.

He returned to Basel following the conclusion of the season, having scored four goals in total for Grasshoppers, two each in the league and in the cup.

=== Wycombe Wanderers ===
On 27 June 2025, Bradley Fink signed for EFL League One side Wycombe Wanderers for an undisclosed fee.

==== Dundee (loan) ====
On 22 August 2026, Fink joined Scottish Premiership club Dundee on a season-long loan. He made his debut the same day, coming off the bench in an away victory in the Dundee derby. Fink scored his first goal for Dundee on 6 September away to Heart of Midlothian, and netted again in the next game 2 weeks later at home to Motherwell. Fink scored his third goal in Dark Blue in a 2-2 draw at home to Rangers.

== International career ==
Fink has represented Switzerland at various youth international levels.

== Personal life ==
Fink can also play for England at international level.

== Career statistics ==
=== Club ===
As of match played 21 November 2026

Appearances and goals by club, season and competition
Club	Season	League			National cup (Note: Includes Swiss Cup and FA Cup)		League cup (Note: Includes EFL Cup)		Continental		Other		Total	
Club	Season	Division	Apps	Goals	Apps	Goals	Apps	Goals	Apps	Goals	Apps	Goals	Apps	Goals
Borussia Dortmund II	2021–22	3. Liga	10	2	—		—		—		—		10	2
Borussia Dortmund II	2022–23	3. Liga	4	1	—		—		—		—		4	1
Borussia Dortmund II	Total		14	3	—		—		—		—		14	3
Basel	2022–23	Swiss Super League	25	5	4	1	—		9 (Note: Appearance(s) in UEFA Europa Conference League)	0	—		38	6
Basel	2023–24	Swiss Super League	0	0	0	0	—		0	0	—		0	0
Basel	2024–25	Swiss Super League	16	1	3	1	—		—		—		19	2
Basel	Total		41	6	7	2	—		9	0	—		57	8
Grasshopper (loan)	2023–24	Swiss Super League	31	2	2	2	—		—		1 (Note: Appearance(s) in Swiss Super League Relegation play-offs)	0	34	4
Wycombe Wanderers	2025–26	League One	22	1	2	0	1	0	—		4 (Note: Appearance(s) in EFL Trophy)	2	29	3
Wycombe Wanderers	2026–27	League One	1	0	0	0	0	0	—		1	0	2	0
Wycombe Wanderers	Total		23	1	2	0	1	0	0	0	5	2	31	3
Dundee (loan)	2026–27	Scottish Premiership	11	4	0	0	—		—		0	0	11	4
Career total			120	16	11	4	1	0	9	0	6	2	147	22

== Honours ==
Basel

- Swiss Super League: 2024–25

Wycombe Wanderers

• Berks and Bucks Cup 2025-26
