= Hugo Vogel (footballer) =

French footballer (born 2004)

Personal information
- Full name: Hugo Marius Gilbert Vogel
- Date of birth: 4 January 2004 (age 22)
- Place of birth: Pierre-Benite, France
- Height: 1.78 m (5 ft 10 in)
- Position: Left-back

Team information
- Current team: Ucf Knights

Youth career
- 2010-2013: Vénissieux
- 2013–2021: Lyon

Senior career*
Years	Team	Apps	(Gls)
2021–2022	Lyon B	10	(0)
2021	Lyon	0	(0)
2022–2023	Basel	4	(0)
2022–2025	Basel II	51	(4)
2026-present	Ucf Knights		

International career^{‡}
2019	France U16	5	(1)
2021–2022	France U18	9	(0)
2022	France U19	2	(0)
- * Club domestic league appearances and goals as of 30 August 2025 ‡ National team caps and goals as of 26 September 2022

Hugo Marius Gilbert Vogel (born 4 January 2004) is a French footballer who plays as a left-back and currently plays for the UCF Knights.

== Early life ==
Vogel was born in Pierre Bénite, but raised in Vénissieux, a town in Lyon Metropolis, starting to play football in the neighboring Vénissieux, before joining the Olympique Lyonnais academy in 2013.

== Club career ==
=== Lyon ===
During the 2021–22 season, Vogel was along with Chaïm El Djebali and Mohamed El Arouch one of only three players born in 2004 to play in the Lyon reserve squad in the Championnat National 2.

As both Sinaly Diomande and Léo Dubois were missing due to injury, Vogel made his professional debut for Lyon on 25 November 2021, replacing Malo Gusto in a 3–1 away UEFA Europa League win against Brøndby. The Pierre-Bénite-born player then started at right-back in Les Gones' final Europa League group game against Rangers. The club drew 1–1 and finished the group stage as unbeaten leaders.

=== Basel ===
In July 2022, after his contract with Lyon was terminated, he decided to leave the club and signed for Swiss Super League club Basel on a four-year contract. He joined Basel's first team for their 2022–23 season under head coach Alexander Frei. After playing in one test game, Vogel made his debut for his new club in the 2022–23 Swiss Cup away match against local amateur club FC Allschwil on 21 August 2022. Basel won by five goals to nil and advanced to the next round.

After August 2023, Vogel was moved to Basel's reserve team in Swiss Promotion League and was not called up to the senior squad anymore.

On 3 September 2025, Vogel's contract with Basel was mutually terminated.

== International career ==
Vogel is a youth international with France, having been a regular with both the under-16 and – after the COVID pandemic – the under-18.

== Style of play ==
Playing mainly as a left-back in the Lyon Academy, he also played at right-back with the reserve, a position where he eventually made his professional debut in 2021.

== Honours ==
Lyon U18

- Coupe Gambardella: 2021–22
