= Ahmed Adams =

Ghanaian footballer (born 1993)

Personal information
- Date of birth: 6 March 1993 (age 33)
- Place of birth: Kumasi, Ghana
- Height: 1.83 m (6 ft 0 in)
- Position: Defender

Senior career*
Years	Team	Apps	(Gls)
2012–2014	Berekum Chelsea	10	(0)
2014–2015	Al-Shoalah	7	(0)
2015–2018	Asante Kotoko		
2019–2020	Berekum Chelsea	13	(0)
2020-2021	Flat Earth FC		
2022	Austfjarða	18	(0)

International career^{‡}
2012	Ghana U20	3	(0)
2015	Ghana U23	5	(0)
- * Club domestic league appearances and goals as of 12 August 2022 ‡ National team caps and goals as of 03:50, 11 May 2022 (UTC)

Ahmed Adams (born 6 March 1993) is a Ghanaian footballer who most recently played as a defender for Iceland club KFA in 2.deild.

== Career ==
=== Club career ===
Adams has played for his club Berekum Chelsea in the Ghana Premier League.

=== International career ===
In 2013, coach Sellas Tetteh called him up to be a member of the Ghana Under 20 national team for the 2013 African Youth Championship in Algeria. He played one match during the tournament.

== Personal life ==
He is the elder brother of TSG Hoffenheim and Black Stars defender Kasim Nuhu Adams.
