= Andy Diouf =

French footballer (born 2003)

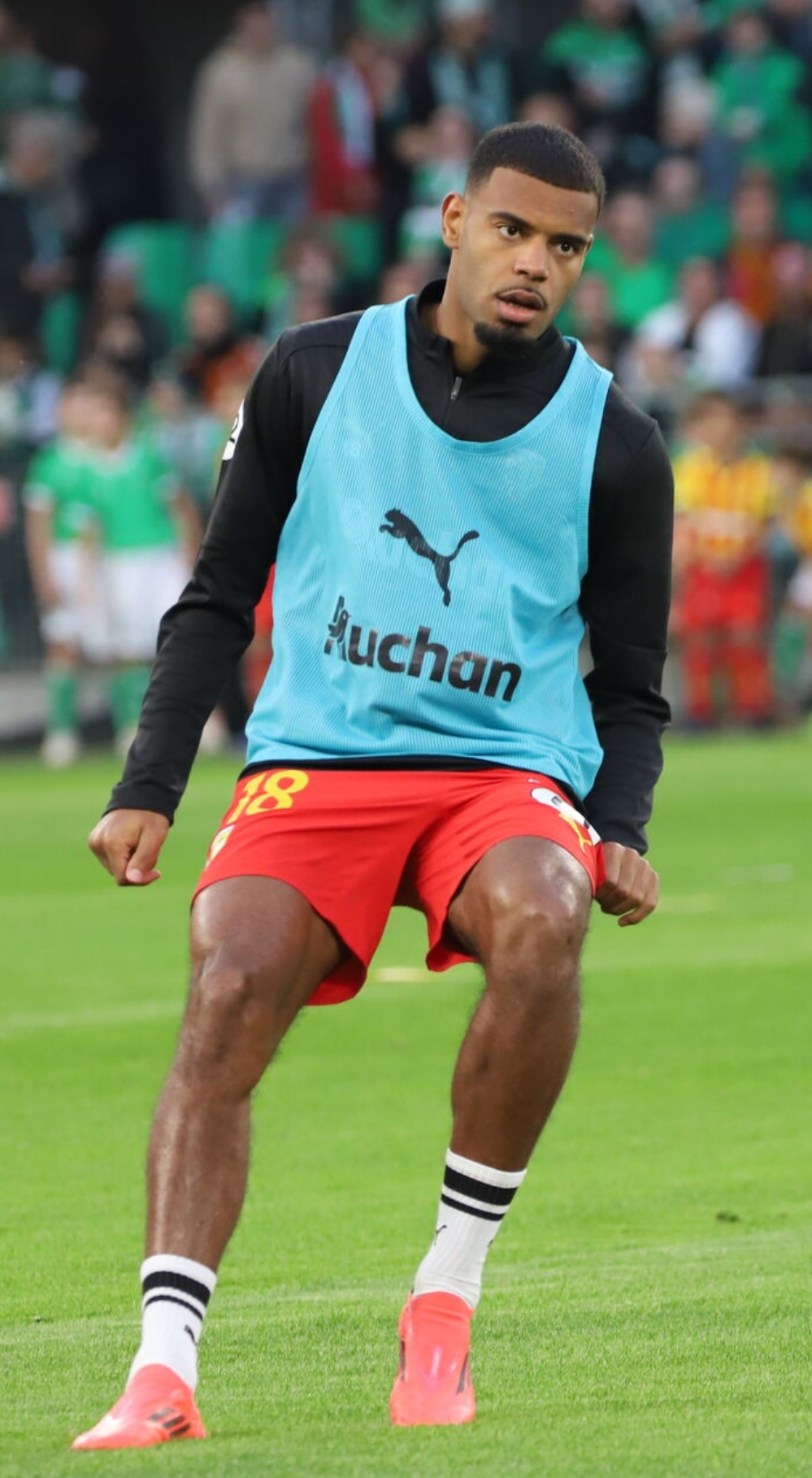
- Diouf with Lens in 2024

Personal information
- Full name: Andy Alune Diouf
- Date of birth: 17 May 2003 (age 23)
- Place of birth: Neuilly-sur-Seine, Hauts-de-Seine, France
- Height: 1.87 m (6 ft 2 in)
- Positions: Central midfielder; right wing-back

Team information
- Current team: Inter Milan
- Number: 17

Youth career
- 2009–2012: Garenne-Colombes
- 2012–2015: Paris Saint-Germain
- 2015–2018: Boulogne-Billancourt
- 2018–2020: Rennes

Senior career*
Years	Team	Apps	(Gls)
2020–2023	Rennes B	10	(0)
2021–2023	Rennes	6	(0)
2022–2023	→ Basel (loan)	34	(3)
2023	Basel	0	(0)
2023–2025	Lens	60	(2)
2025–	Inter Milan	29	(1)

International career^{‡}
2019	France U17	2	(0)
2021–2022	France U19	18	(0)
2022–2024	France U20	6	(2)
2023–2025	France U21	10	(0)
2024	France Olympic	5	(1)
2026–	France	4	(0)
Medal record
Men's football
Representing France
Olympic Games
Silver medal – second place	Paris 2024	Team
- * Club domestic league appearances and goals as of 8 November 2026 ‡ National team caps and goals as of 15 November 2026

Andy Alune Diouf (born 17 May 2003) is a French professional footballer who plays as a central midfielder or right wing-back for Serie A club Inter Milan and the France national team.

== Early life ==
Born in Neuilly-sur-Seine, Hauts-de-Seine, Diouf was raised in Nanterre. He started playing football at the age of 6 years, in the nearby La Garenne-Colombes.

== Club career ==
=== Rennes ===
Diouf played for the youth teams of Paris Saint-Germain (PSG) and Boulogne-Billancourt, also spending two years at the INF Clairefontaine, before joining the Rennes academy in 2015. He made his professional debut for Rennes on 9 May 2021, coming on as a substitute in a 1–1 Ligue 1 home draw against his former club PSG.

=== Basel ===
On 18 July 2022, Diouf joined Basel in Switzerland on a season-long loan with an option to buy. He joined Basel's first team for their 2022–23 season under head coach Alexander Frei. Diouf played his domestic league debut for his new club on 24 July 2022 in the home game in the St. Jakob Stadium as Basel played a 1–1 draw against Servette. He scored his first goal for his new team on 13 October in the away game in the Tehelné pole stadium as Basel played in the 2022–23 UEFA Europa Conference League group stage against Slovan Bratislava. Diouf was substituted in for Wouter Burger in the 64th minute as Basel were 3–1 down and he scored just one minute later. His first shot was blocked, but he headed home the rebound. Just seven minutes later Basel equalised and the game ended in a 3–3 draw.

On 2 May 2023, the option to buy was activated, with Diouf signing a four-year contract. But, not quite two months later, the midfielder decided to move back to France. During his one season with the club, Diouf played a total of 60 games for Basel scoring a total of three goals. 34 of these games were in the Swiss Super League, five in the Swiss Cup, 18 in the 2022–23 UEFA Europa Conference League, where the team advanced to the semi-finals and three were friendly games. He scored all three goals in the UEFA Europa Conference League.

=== Lens ===
On 30 June 2023, Diouf signed for Ligue 1 club Lens on a five-year contract. He scored his first goal for the club in a 2–0 away win over Toulouse on 28 January 2024.

=== Inter Milan ===
On 22 August 2025, Diouf joined Serie A club Inter Milan, signing a five-year contract. Later that year, on 3 December, he netted his first goal in a 5–1 victory over Venezia in the Coppa Italia. On 28 January 2026, he scored his first UEFA Champions League goal in the stoppage time of a 2–0 away win over Borussia Dortmund.

== International career ==
Diouf was born in France to a Senegalese father and a French mother. He is a youth international for France.

On 28 September 2026, Diouf made his debut for the France national team in a 2026–27 UEFA Nations League A game against Belgium.

== Career statistics ==
As of match played 19 September 2026

Appearances and goals by club, season and competition
Club	Season	League			National cup (Note: Includes Coupe de France, Swiss Cup, Coppa Italia)		Europe		Other		Total	
Club	Season	Division	Apps	Goals	Apps	Goals	Apps	Goals	Apps	Goal	Apps	Goals
Rennes	2020–21	Ligue 1	1	0	0	0	—		—		1	0
Rennes	2021–22	Ligue 1	5	0	1	0	0	0	—		6	0
Rennes	Total		6	0	1	0	0	0	—		7	0
Basel (loan)	2022–23	Swiss Super League	34	0	4	0	18 (Note: Appearances in UEFA Europa Conference League)	3	—		56	3
Lens	2023–24	Ligue 1	25	1	1	0	4 (Note: Two appearances in UEFA Champions League, two appearances in UEFA Europa League)	0	—		30	1
Lens	2024–25	Ligue 1	34	1	1	0	2 (Note: Appearances in UEFA Europa League)	0	—		37	1
Lens	2025–26	Ligue 1	1	0	—		—		—		1	0
Lens	Total		60	2	2	0	6	0	—		68	2
Inter Milan	2025–26	Serie A	19	1	5	2	4 (Note: Appearances in UEFA Champions League)	1	1 (Note: Appearance in Supercoppa Italiana)	0	29	4
Inter Milan	2026–27	Serie A	4	0	0	0	1	0	0	0	5	0
Inter Milan	Total		23	1	5	2	5	1	1	0	34	4
Career total			123	3	12	2	29	4	1	0	165	9

=== International ===
As of match played 15 November 2026

Appearances and goals by national team and year
National team	Year	Apps	Goals
France	2026	4	0
Total		4	0

== Honours ==
Inter Milan

- Serie A: 2025–26
- Coppa Italia: 2025–26

France U23

- Summer Olympics silver medal: 2024

Individual

- UEFA Europa Conference League Young Player of the Season: 2022–23
- UEFA Europa Conference League Team of the Season: 2022–23

Orders

- Knight of the National Order of Merit: 2024
