= Heiko Vogel =

German football manager (born 1975)

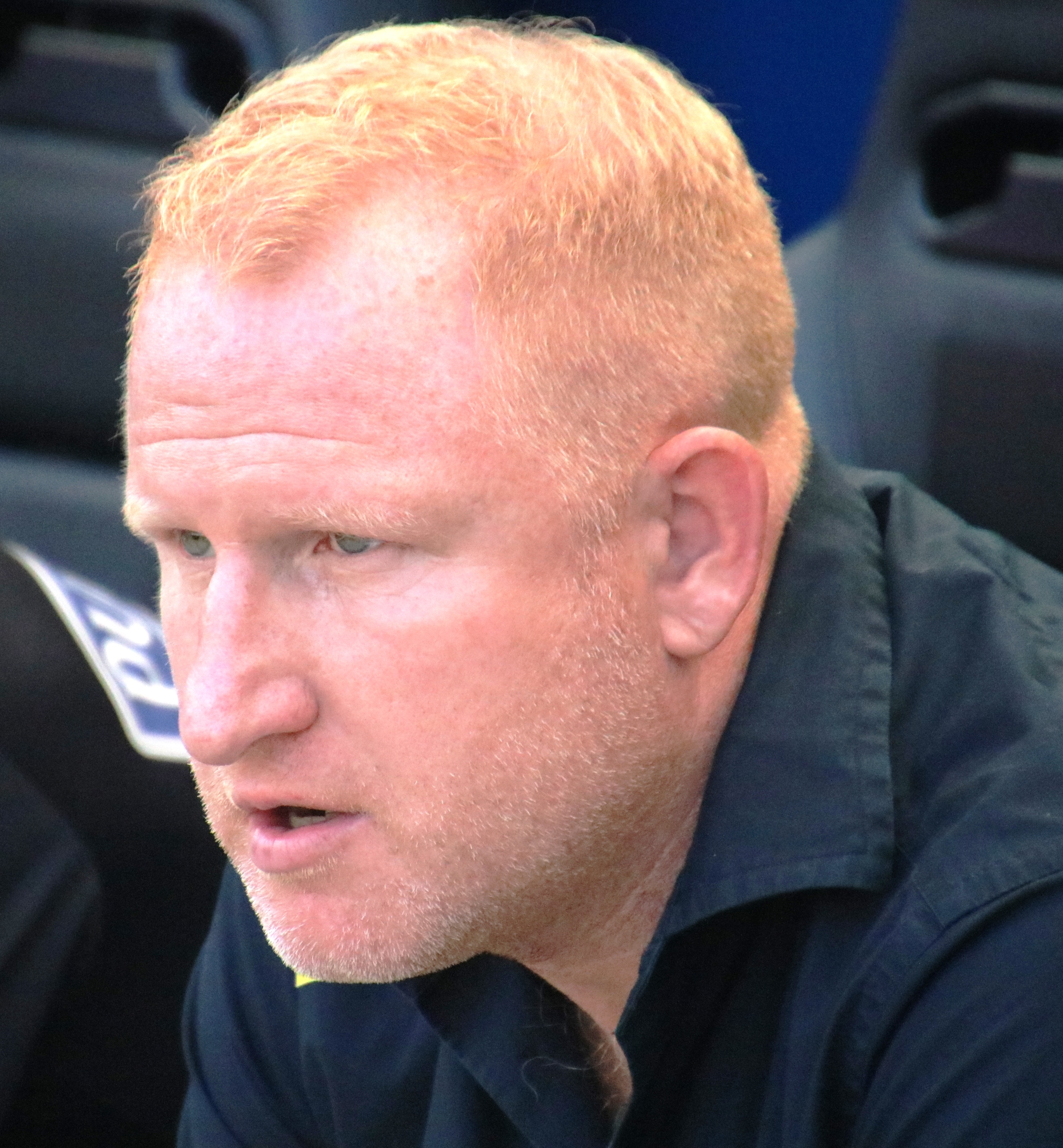
- Vogel in 2018

Personal information
- Date of birth: 21 November 1975 (age 51)
- Place of birth: Bad Dürkheim, West Germany
- Position: Midfielder

Team information
- Current team: Greuther Fürth (manager)

Youth career
- TuS Wachenheim
- FC 08 Hassloch

Senior career*
Years	Team	Apps	(Gls)
- SV Edenkoben

Managerial career
- 2011–2012: FC Basel
- 2015–2017: Bayern Munich II
- 2018: Sturm Graz
- 2019: KFC Uerdingen
- 2020–2022: Borussia Mönchengladbach II
- 2023: FC Basel (caretaker)
- 2023: FC Basel
- 2025–: Greuther Fürth
- * Club domestic league appearances and goals

Heiko Vogel (born 21 November 1975) is a German football manager of Greuther Fürth.

Vogel grew up in Wachenheim and played football for his local clubs TuS Wachenheim and FC 08 Hassloch. Later he played for SV Edenkoben.

== Coaching career ==
=== Bayern Munich and Ingolstadt ===
He did his apprenticeship and became a sports teacher. Between 1998 and 2007, he worked within the youth system of FC Bayern Munich as coach. From 2007 until 2009, he worked as assistant to Thorsten Fink at FC Ingolstadt 04.

=== FC Basel ===
On 9 June 2009, Fink was appointed as the new manager of FC Basel and Vogel followed as assistant straight away. Under Fink and Vogel Basel won the Swiss Cup 2010 and the national Championship in 2010 and 2011.

On 13 October 2011, Fink left the club to join Hamburger SV and on the same day Vogel was appointed as caretaker Manager. Vogel's first three games in charge of the team were the Swiss Cup fixture on 15 October, which ended in a 5–1 away win against FC Schötz, the Champions League Group C fixture on 18 October 2011, a 0–2 home defeat against Benfica, and the 1–0 away win in the Super League against FC Zürich. On 7 December 2011 he guided FC Basel to the round of 16 in the UEFA Champions League, defeating the 2011 runners up Manchester United by 2–1. After 11 games, four of which in the Champions League, with eight wins, two draws and only one defeat, it was announced on 12 December that Vogel had signed as head coach and manager. Basel won the league championship and the Swiss Cup during the 2011–12 season. On 15 October 2012, Vogel was sacked by the club and was replaced by Murat Yakin. His final match was a 3–2 win against Servette. Basel were in fourth place when Vogel left the club.

=== Return to Bayern Munich ===
He returned to coach in the Bayern Munich Junior Team before being appointed to Bayern Munich II. He replaced Erik ten Hag who became the sporting director and head coach of FC Utrecht. The first training as the reserve team head coach happened on 11 June 2015. His first match was 1–1 draw against FV Illertissen on 29 July 2015. Bayern II finished the 2015–16 season in sixth place. On 22 February 2017, it was announced that Vogel will be leaving the reserve team at the end of the season by mutual consent. Vogel resigned on 21 March 2017. His final match was a 2–1 loss to 1860 Rosenheim.

=== Sturm Graz ===
In December 2017, Sturm Graz presented Heiko Vogel as the new head coach. He was the successor of Franco Foda, who left the club to coach Austrias national team. Vogel started his new position on 1 January 2018. His first match as head coach was a 1–0 loss against Mattersburg on 3 February 2018. He started the 2018–19 season with a 2–0 win in the Austrian Cup against Siegendorf. Sturm Graz were knocked out of Champions League in the second qualifying round by Ajax and entered the Europa League. Sturm Graz were eliminated from the Europa League by AEK Larnaca.

=== KFC Uerdingen ===
On 27 April 2019, he was appointed as the new head coach of KFC Uerdingen. He was terminated on 25 September 2019.

=== Borussia Mönchengladbach II ===
On 26 May 2020, he became the coach of the Borussia Mönchengladbach II, the U23 of Mönchengladbach, who play in the Regionalliga West. On 18 May 2021, his departure following the conclusion of the season was announced.

=== Return to FC Basel ===
On 28 November 2022, he was announced as the new sporting director of his former club FC Basel in the Swiss Super League, per 1 January 2023. A little over a month later he once again took up coaching in the interim for Basel, after coach Alex Frei was terminated on 7 February 2023. He coached the team for the remainder of the season and led them to the semi-final of the UEFA Europa Conference League, where they were eliminated in extra time by ACF Fiorentina, with a aggregate score of 3–4.

On 12 May, the club announced that Timo Schultz would take over as coach of the team for the next season, thus allowing Vogel to return to his original position as sporting director. However, due to poor performances in the league and elimination in UEFA Europa Conference League qualifying to FC Tobol, Schultz was dismissed on 29 September and Vogel once again took up coaching duties. In his third stint as FC Basel manager, Vogel would merely last for one month: he was dismissed on 31 October 2023, following four losses in a row with a goal difference of 0–10.

=== Greuther Fürth ===
On 1 December 2025, Vogel was announced as the new manager of Greuther Fürth in the 2. Bundesliga.

== Coaching record ==
As of matches played on 21 November 2026

Team	From	To	Record					
Team	From	To	G	W	D	L	Win %	Ref.
Bayern Munich U17	1 July 2007	31 December 2007	13	6	2	5	46.15	
Basel	13 October 2011	15 October 2012	55	33	15	7	60.00	
Bayern Munich U19	29 October 2013	30 June 2015	43	20	9	14	46.51	
Bayern Munich II	1 July 2015	21 March 2017	59	24	19	16	40.68	
Sturm Graz	1 January 2018	5 November 2018	38	15	8	15	39.47	
KFC Uerdingen	27 April 2019	25 September 2019	16	4	4	8	25.00	
Borussia Mönchengladbach II	1 July 2020	30 June 2022	78	28	14	36	35.90	
Basel (interim)	7 February 2023	30 June 2023	27	11	9	7	40.74	
Basel	29 September 2023	31 October 2023	4	0	0	4	0.00	
Greuther Fürth	1 December 2025	Present	35	10	9	16	28.57	
Total			368	151	89	128	41.03	—

== Honours ==
Basel

- Swiss Super League: 2011–12
- Swiss Cup: 2011–12

Sturm Graz

- Austrian Cup: 2017–18

KFC Uerdingen

- Lower Rhine Cup: 2018–19

Personal

- Swiss Manager of the Year: 2012
- Axpo Super League Fairplay Award: 2012
