= Kasim Nuhu =

Ghanaian footballer (born 1995)

Kasim Adams
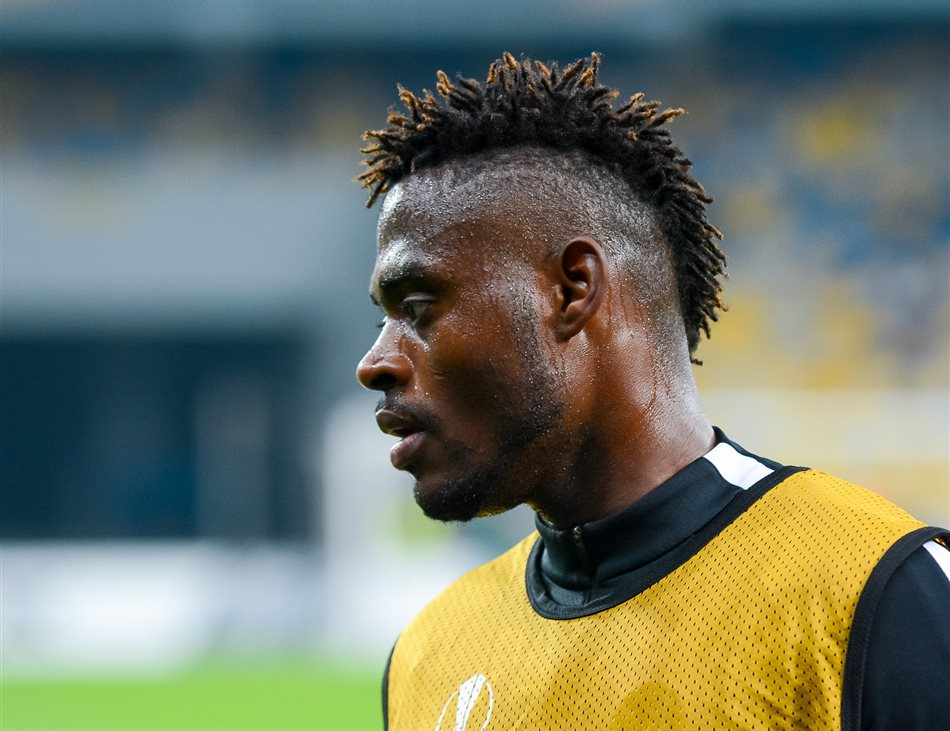
- Kasim with Young Boys in 2017

Personal information
- Full name: Kasim Adams Nuhu
- Date of birth: 22 June 1995 (age 31)
- Place of birth: Kumasi, Ghana
- Height: 1.90 m (6 ft 3 in)
- Position: Centre-back

Team information
- Current team: KuPS
- Number: 4

Youth career
- –2013: Medeama
- 2013–2014: Leganés

Senior career*
Years	Team	Apps	(Gls)
2013	Medeama	1	(0)
2014–2015	Leganés	0	(0)
2014–2015	→ Mallorca B (loan)	9	(0)
2015–2017	Mallorca	26	(2)
2016–2017	→ Young Boys (loan)	18	(0)
2017–2018	Young Boys	32	(2)
2018–2024	TSG Hoffenheim	29	(0)
2019–2020	→ Fortuna Düsseldorf (loan)	13	(1)
2022–2023	→ Basel (loan)	28	(1)
2024–2025	Servette	17	(1)
2026–	KuPS	14	(0)

International career^{‡}
2017–	Ghana	16	(2)
- * Club domestic league appearances and goals as of 12 November 2026 ‡ National team caps and goals as of 22:30, 10 December 2022 (UTC)

Kasim Adams Nuhu (born 22 June 1995), also known simply as Kasim, or in Switzerland better known as Adams Nuhu, is a Ghanaian professional footballer who plays as a centre-back for Veikkausliiga club KuPS and the Ghana national team.

== Club career ==
Born in Kumasi, Kasim graduated with local Medeama SC's youth setup, and made his senior debut on 14 April 2013, coming on as a second-half substitute in a 0–0 away draw against Heart of Lions FC in the Ghana Premier League. In November he moved to CD Leganés, being assigned to the club's youth setup.

=== Real Mallorca ===
In January 2014 Kasim joined RCD Mallorca in a three-year loan deal, with a €200,000 buyout clause, and was initially assigned to the reserves in the Tercera División. He appeared in 17 matches during the campaign and scored two goals (against Penya Ciutadella and CD Atlético Rafal), as his side returned to the Segunda División B at first attempt.

On 28 September 2014, Kasim played his first match as a professional, starting and scoring a brace in a 3–3 home draw against FC Barcelona B in the Segunda División. He was subsequently made a starter by manager Valeri Karpin, overtaking Agus and Joan Truyols.

Kasim lost his first-team place after the arrival of new manager Fernando Vázquez, being demoted to fifth choice. On 25 August 2016, he was loaned from Mallorca to Swiss club BSC Young Boys, for one year.

=== Young Boys ===
Now known as Nuhu, he was part of the Young Boys squad that won the 2017–18 Swiss Super League, their first league title for 32 years.

=== TSG Hoffenheim ===
On 25 July 2018, it was announced that Kasim would join TSG Hoffenheim on a five-year contract.

==== Loan to Fortuna Düsseldorf ====
On 8 August 2019, he was loaned out to Fortuna Düsseldorf until the end of 2019–20 season.

==== Loan to Basel ====
On 21 July 2022, Kasim joined Basel on loan, with an option to make the move permanent. Now better known as Adams Nuhu, he joined Basel's first team for their 2022–23 season under head coach Alexander Frei. Adams Nuhu made his debut for his new club in the home game in the St. Jakob-Park on 24 July as Basel played a 1–1 draw against Servette. He scored his first goal for the team on 1 February 2023 in the away game in the Letzigrund, Zürich, during the third round of the 2022–23 Swiss Cup. It was the team's fourth goal as Basel won 5–3 against Grasshopper Club to qualify for the quarter-finals. At the end of the season the club decided not to pull the buy out option and the player left the club. During his time with them, Adams Nuhu played a total of 50 games for Basel scoring a total of three goals. 28 of these games were in the Swiss Super League, three in the Swiss Cup, 15 in the UEFA Europa Conference League and four were friendly games. He scored one goal in the domestic league, one in the cup and one in the European games.

=== Expired contract in Hoffenheim ===
On 21 May 2024, TSG Hoffenheim announced that he will leave the club after this season when his contract expires.

=== Servette ===
On 30 August 2024, Kasim returned to Switzerland and signed with Servette.

=== KuPS ===
In March 2026, Adams signed with Finnish Veikkausliiga club Kuopion Palloseura (KuPS).

== International career ==
On 12 November 2017, Kasim scored on his international debut for Ghana against Saudi Arabia.

== Personal life ==
Kasim is the younger brother of Ashanti Gold SC defender Ahmed Adams.

== Career statistics ==
=== Club ===
As of match played 10 March 2024

Appearances and goals by club, season and competition
Club	Season	League			Cup		Europe		Other		Total	
Club	Season	Division	Apps	Goals	Apps	Goals	Apps	Goals	Apps	Goals	Apps	Goals
Mallorca B (loan)	2014–15	Segunda División B	9	0	0	0	–		0	0	9	0
Mallorca (loan)	2014–15	Segunda División	20	2	0	0	–		0	0	20	2
Mallorca	2015–16	Segunda División	6	0	0	0	–		0	0	6	0
Young Boys (loan)	2016–17	Swiss Super League	18	0	2	0	4	0	0	0	24	0
Young Boys	2017–18	Swiss Super League	32	2	4	0	8	0	1	0	45	2
TSG Hoffenheim	2018–19	Bundesliga	13	0	1	0	2	0	0	0	16	0
TSG Hoffenheim	2020–21	Bundesliga	12	0	2	0	4	0	0	0	18	0
TSG Hoffenheim	2021–22	Bundesliga	3	0	0	0	–		0	0	3	0
TSG Hoffenheim	2023–24	Bundesliga	1	0	0	0	–		0	0	1	0
TSG Hoffenheim	Total		29	0	3	0	6	0	0	0	38	0
Fortuna Düsseldorf (loan)	2019–20	Bundesliga	13	1	2	1	–		0	0	15	2
Basel (loan)	2022–23	Swiss Super League	28	0	3	0	15 (Note: Appearances in UEFA Europa Conference League)	1	0	0	46	1
Career total			155	5	14	1	33	1	1	0	202	7

=== International ===
As of matches played on 15 July 2019

Appearances and goals by national team and year
National team	Year	Apps	Goals
Ghana	2017	1	0
Ghana	2018	3	1
Ghana	2019	4	0
Total		8	1

Scores and results list Ghana's goal tally first, score column indicates score after each Nuhu goal.

List of international goals scored by Kasim Nuhu
No.	Date	Venue	Opponent	Score	Result	Competition
1	7 June 2018	Laugardalsvöllur, Reykjavík, Iceland	Iceland	1–2	2–2	Friendly

== Honours ==
Young Boys

- Swiss Super League: 2017–18
