= Albin Krasniqi (footballer, born 2003) =

Swiss footballer (born 2002)

Personal information
- Date of birth: 6 April 2003 (age 23)
- Place of birth: Solothurn, Switzerland
- Height: 1.80 m (5 ft 11 in)
- Position: Winger

Team information
- Current team: Kriens
- Number: 17

Youth career
- 2010–2012: Wacker Grenchen
- 2012–2019: Solothurn
- 2019–2021: Basel

Senior career*
Years	Team	Apps	(Gls)
2021–2023	Basel II	33	(14)
2023–2024	St. Gallen II	32	(12)
2023–2024	St. Gallen	9	(1)
2024–2026	Winterthur	5	(0)
2024–2025	Winterthur II	16	(4)
2025–2026	→ Wacker Innsbruck (loan)	20	(4)
2026–	Kriens	9	(4)

International career^{‡}
2023	Switzerland U21	2	(0)
- * Club domestic league appearances and goals as of 18 September 2026 ‡ National team caps and goals as of 05:42, 20 December 2023 (UTC)

Albin Krasniqi (born 6 April 2003) is a Swiss professional footballer who plays as a winger for Swiss Challenge League club Kriens.

== Club career ==
Krasniqi is a youth product of FC Wacker Grenchen, Solothurn and Basel. He began his senior career with Basel's reserves in 2021, and on 12 April 2023 moved to the reserves of St. Gallen. In the summer of 2023, he started training with St. Gallen's senior team, and eventually joined them permanently. He made his senior and professional debut with St. Gallen as a substitute in a 1–0 Swiss Super League loss to Lugano on 29 July 2023.

On 16 July 2025, Krasniqi joined Wacker Innsbruck on loan for the 2025-26 season.

== International career ==
Born in Switzerland, Krasniqi is of Kosovan descent. He is a youth international for Switzerland, having played for the Switzerland U21s.
