= Zeki Amdouni =

Swiss footballer (born 2000)

Personal information
- Full name: Mohamed Zeki Amdouni
- Date of birth: 4 December 2000 (age 25)
- Place of birth: Geneva, Switzerland
- Height: 1.85 m (6 ft 1 in)
- Positions: Attacking midfielder; forward

Team information
- Current team: Burnley
- Number: 11

Youth career
- 2008–2013: Servette
- 2013–2018: Meyrin
- 2017–2018: → Étoile Carouge (loan)

Senior career*
Years	Team	Apps	(Gls)
2018–2019	Étoile Carouge	38	(14)
2019–2021	Stade Lausanne Ouchy	56	(14)
2021–2023	Lausanne-Sport	34	(12)
2022–2023	→ Basel (loan)	32	(12)
2023–	Burnley	50	(9)
2024–2025	→ Benfica (loan)	24	(7)

International career^{‡}
2019	Switzerland U20	2	(0)
2021	Turkey U21	1	(0)
2021–2023	Switzerland U21	15	(9)
2022–	Switzerland	39	(15)
- * Club domestic league appearances and goals as of 09:50, 8 November 2026 (UTC) ‡ National team caps and goals as of 22:22, 16 November 2026 (UTC)

Mohamed Zeki Amdouni (born 4 December 2000) is a Swiss professional footballer who plays as an attacking midfielder or forward for EFL Championship club Burnley and the Switzerland national team.

== Club career ==
=== Early years ===
Amdouni is a youth product of Servette, Meyrin, and Étoile Carouge. He began his career with Étoile Carouge, playing in the 1. Liga the fourth tier of the Swiss football league system, before moving to Stade Lausanne Ouchy in the Swiss Challenge League in 2019. On 9 June 2021, he transferred to Lausanne-Sport in the Swiss Super League. He made his professional debut with Lausanne-Sport in a 2–1 Swiss Super League defeat against FC St. Gallen on 24 July 2021. At the end of the 2021–22 season Lausanne-Sport suffered relegation, but Amdouni was the team's top scorer with 12 goals.

=== Basel ===
On 24 June 2022, Amdouni joined Basel's first team for their 2022–23 season under head coach Alexander Frei signing a two-year loan with an option for the club to buy. After playing in two test games, in each of which he had scored a goal, Amdouni played his domestic league debut for his new club in the away game in the Schützenwiese on 16 July 2022 as Basel drew 1–1 with Winterthur. He played his first European match in the second qualifying round of the 2022–23 UEFA Europa Conference League 21 July, it was the home game in the St. Jakob-Park as Basel won 2–0 against Northern Ireland team Crusaders. Amdouni scored his first goal for the club on 28 August in the away game in the Letzigrund against Zürich as Basel won 4–2.

Basel finished the Conference League group stage in second position and advanced to the Knockout round. It was here that Amdoumi showed his goal scoring flair, with seven goals in eight outings, during Basel's run to the semi-finals, where they lost to Fiorentina after extra time in the second leg. These seven goals made Amdouni the competition's joint top goal scorer together with Arthur Cabral of Fiorentina. On 2 May 2023, Basel's option to buy the player was activated, with Amdouni signing a four-year contract. On 17 July 2023, Basel confirmed that although Amdouni had joined the club permanently, he was in talks for a move to another team and two days later he left the club.

During his one season with them, Amdouni played a total of 58 games for Basel scoring a total of 25 goals. 32 of these games were in the Swiss Super League, three in the Swiss Cup, 17 in the UEFA Europa Conference League, and six were friendly games. He scored 12 goals in the domestic league, three in the cup, seven in the European games and the other three were scored during the test games.

=== Burnley ===
On 19 July 2023, Amdouni signed for newly-promoted Premier League club Burnley on a five-year contract, for an undisclosed fee. Later that year, on 18 September, he scored his first Premier League goal in a 1–1 away draw with Nottingham Forest.

==== Loan to Benfica ====
On 29 August 2024, Amdouni signed for Portuguese club Benfica on a year-long loan. He made his competitive debut for his new club on 14 September in a 4–1 home league victory over Santa Clara, and scored his first goal in a 5–1 win against Gil Vicente on 28 September. Later that year, on 27 November, he scored his first UEFA Champions League goal, helping his team secure a 3–2 away victory over Monaco.

== International career ==
Amdouni was born in Switzerland to a Turkish father and Tunisian mother. He represented Switzerland U20, before switching to represent Turkey U21 in May 2019. That same month, he again switched over to Switzerland U21.

He was called up by the senior Switzerland squad for the 2022–23 UEFA Nations League matches against Czech Republic, Portugal and Spain in June 2022. He made his debut on 27 September 2022 in a Nations League match against the Czech Republic, replacing Ruben Vargas as a 79th-minute substitute.

On 25 March 2023, Amdouni scored his first international goal against Belarus, as Switzerland won 5–0 in a UEFA Euro 2024 qualifying match. He went to make his first start for the national team against Israel three days later, scoring the second goal of a 3–0 win. He ended the Euro qualifying campaign with six goals from ten appearances, scoring the winning goal in a 2–1 win away to Andorra, both goals of a 2–2 draw at home to Romania, and a 90th minute equaliser in a 3–3 draw in Belarus.

On 7 June 2024, Amdouni was named in Switzerland's squad for the UEFA Euro 2024 finals in Germany. He appeared as a substitute in the team's first match, replacing opening goalscorer Kwadwo Duah in the 68th minute of the 3–1 win over Hungary in Cologne.

On 20 May 2026, Amdouni was selected in the 26-man squad for the 2026 FIFA World Cup.

== Career statistics ==
=== Club ===
As of match played 7 November 2026

Appearances and goals by club, season and competition
Club	Season	League			National cup (Note: Includes Swiss Cup, FA Cup, Taça de Portugal)		League cup (Note: Includes EFL Cup, Taça da Liga)		Europe		Other		Total	
Club	Season	Division	Apps	Goals	Apps	Goals	Apps	Goals	Apps	Goals	Apps	Goals	Apps	Goals
Étoile Carouge	2017–18	Swiss 1. Liga	13	4			—		—		—		13	4
Étoile Carouge	2018–19	Swiss 1. Liga	25	10			—		—		—		25	10
Étoile Carouge	Total		38	14			—		—		—		38	14
Stade Lausanne Ouchy	2019–20	Swiss Challenge League	24	3	3	1	—		—		—		27	4
Stade Lausanne Ouchy	2020–21	Swiss Challenge League	32	11	1	0	—		—		—		33	11
Stade Lausanne Ouchy	Total		56	14	4	1	—		—		—		60	15
Lausanne-Sport	2021–22	Swiss Super League	34	12	4	3	—		—		—		38	15
Basel (loan)	2022–23	Swiss Super League	32	12	3	3	—		17 (Note: Appearances in UEFA Europa Conference League)	7	—		52	22
Burnley	2023–24	Premier League	34	5	1	0	2	1	—		—		37	6
Burnley	2024–25	Championship	2	1	—		0	0	—		—		2	1
Burnley	2025–26	Premier League	4	0	0	0	0	0	—		—		4	0
Burnley	2026–27	Championship	10	3	0	0	2	0	—		—		12	3
Burnley	Total		50	9	1	0	4	1	—		—		55	10
Benfica (loan)	2024–25	Primeira Liga	24	7	6	1	2	0	11 (Note: Appearances in UEFA Champions League)	1	0	0	43	9
Career total			234	68	18	8	6	1	28	8	0	0	286	85

=== International ===
As of match played 16 November 2026

Appearances and goals by national team and year
National team	Year	Apps	Goals
Switzerland	2022	1	0
Switzerland	2023	10	6
Switzerland	2024	14	4
Switzerland	2025	2	1
Switzerland	2026	12	4
Total		39	15

Switzerland score listed first, score column indicates score after each Amdouni goal.

International goals by date, venue, cap, opponent, score, result and competition
No.	Date	Venue	Cap	Opponent	Score	Result	Competition
1	25 March 2023	Karađorđe Stadium, Novi Sad, Serbia	2	Belarus	5–0	5–0	UEFA Euro 2024 qualifying
2	28 March 2023	Stade de Genève, Geneva, Switzerland	3	Israel	2–0	3–0	UEFA Euro 2024 qualifying
3	16 June 2023	Estadi Nacional, Andorra la Vella, Andorra	4	Andorra	2–0	2–1	UEFA Euro 2024 qualifying
4	19 June 2023	Swissporarena, Lucerne, Switzerland	5	Romania	1–0	2–2	UEFA Euro 2024 qualifying
5	19 June 2023	Swissporarena, Lucerne, Switzerland	5	Romania	2–0	2–2	UEFA Euro 2024 qualifying
6	15 October 2023	Kybunpark, St Gallen, Switzerland	8	Belarus	3–3	3–3	UEFA Euro 2024 qualifying
7	4 June 2024	Swissporarena, Lucerne, Switzerland	14	Estonia	2–0	4–0	Friendly
8	8 September 2024	Stade de Genève, Geneva, Switzerland	21	Spain	1–2	1–4	2024–25 UEFA Nations League A
9	15 October 2024	Kybunpark, St. Gallen, Switzerland	23	Denmark	2–1	2–2	2024–25 UEFA Nations League A
10	15 November 2024	Stadion Letzigrund, Zurich, Switzerland	24	Serbia	1–0	1–1	2024–25 UEFA Nations League A
11	7 June 2025	Rice–Eccles Stadium, Salt Lake City, United States	26	Mexico	2–1	4–2	Friendly
12	26 September 2026	Toše Proeski Arena, Skopje, North Macedonia	34	North Macedonia	2–0	3–0	2026–27 UEFA Nations League B
13	26 September 2026	Toše Proeski Arena, Skopje, North Macedonia	34	North Macedonia	3–0	3–0	2026–27 UEFA Nations League B
14	29 September 2026	Hampden Park, Glasgow, Scotland	35	Scotland	3–0	3–0	2026–27 UEFA Nations League B
15	16 November 2026	Sitterstadion, St.Gallen, Switzerland	39	Scotland	4–0	4–0	2026–27 UEFA Nations League B

== Honours ==
Benfica

- Taça da Liga: 2024–25

Individual

- Swiss Super League Player of the Month: February 2023
- Swiss Super League Team of the Year: 2022–23
- UEFA Europa Conference League Top scorer: 2022–23
