= Andi Zeqiri =

Swiss footballer (born 1999)

Personal information
- Full name: Andi Avdi Zeqiri
- Date of birth: 22 June 1999 (age 27)
- Place of birth: Lausanne, Switzerland
- Height: 1.85 m (6 ft 1 in)
- Position: Centre-forward

Team information
- Current team: Standard Liège (on loan from Widzew Łódź}
- Number: 9

Youth career
- 2008–2011: Stade Lausanne-Ouchy
- 2011–2017: Lausanne-Sport
- 2016–2017: → Juventus (loan)

Senior career*
Years	Team	Apps	(Gls)
2015–2020	Lausanne-Sport	94	(28)
2020–2023	Brighton & Hove Albion	9	(0)
2021–2022	→ FC Augsburg (loan)	22	(2)
2022–2023	→ Basel (loan)	30	(11)
2023–2025	Genk	32	(7)
2024–2025	→ Standard Liège (loan)	24	(9)
2025–	Widzew Łódź	24	(1)
2026–	→ Standard Liège (loan)	0	(0)

International career^{‡}
2013–2014	Switzerland U15	3	(1)
2014–2015	Switzerland U16	7	(3)
2014–2016	Switzerland U17	13	(4)
2016–2017	Switzerland U18	7	(3)
2015–2017	Switzerland U19	13	(5)
2018	Switzerland U20	2	(2)
2018–2021	Switzerland U21	16	(11)
2021–	Switzerland	18	(1)
- * Club domestic league appearances and goals as of 17:22, 29 May 2026 (UTC) ‡ National team caps and goals as of 21:57, 18 November 2025 (UTC)

Andi Avdi Zeqiri (born 22 June 1999) is a Swiss professional footballer who plays as a striker for Belgian Pro League club Standard Liège, on loan from Widzew Łódź, and the Switzerland national team.

== Club career ==
=== Early career and Lausanne ===
At the age of nine, Zeqiri started playing football for local team Stade Lausanne-Ouchy, where after three years he was transferred to Lausanne, playing with the youth teams in 24 matches and scoring 15 goals. On 22 May 2015, a month before his 16th birthday, Zeqiri made his professional debut in a 2–1 away defeat against Le Mont, coming on as a substitute in the 71st minute in place of Anđelko Savić. Zeqiri became Lausanne's youngest league debutant in this game.

==== Loan at Juventus ====
On 30 August 2016, Zeqiri joined Campionato Primavera 2 side Juventus Youth, on a season-long loan with an option to buy. On 1 October 2016, he made his debut in a 2–0 home win against Sassuolo after coming on as a substitute in the 68th minute in place of Moise Kean.

==== Return from loan ====
On 1 July 2017, Zeqiri returned to Swiss Super League side Lausanne. On 12 August 2017, he played the first game after the return in the 2017–18 Swiss Cup first round against NK Pajde Möhlin after coming on as a substitute at 89th minute in place of Gabriel Torres.

=== Brighton & Hove Albion ===
On 1 October 2020, Zeqiri signed a four-year contract with Premier League club Brighton & Hove Albion. He made his debut in a 1–1 home draw against Sheffield United on 20 December coming on as a substitute in the 72nd minute. He made his first start for the "Seagulls" on 10 January 2021 in a third round FA Cup tie away at Newport County where Brighton won on penalties with Zeqiri being replaced in the 63rd minute. Zeqiri came on as a substitute in Brighton's 1–0 away victory over defending champions Liverpool on 3 February claiming their first league win at Anfield since 1982. A few months later, he came on as a substitute in another huge win, Brighton's 3–2 home victory over champions Manchester City on 18 May, with fans returning to football, in which they went from 2–0 down to beat City for the first time since 1989.

Zeqiri scored his first Brighton goal in his first game of the 2021–22 season scoring the second in the 2–0 EFL Cup second round away win over Cardiff City in what was also his League Cup debut.

==== FC Augsburg (loan) ====
On 30 August 2021, it was announced that Zeqiri had signed for Bundesliga side FC Augsburg on loan for the 2021–22 season. He made his debut on 11 September, coming on as a substitute in the 0–0 away draw at Union Berlin. Zeqiri scored his first goal for the club on 2 October, scoring the equaliser in an eventual 2–1 away loss against Borussia Dortmund.

==== FC Basel (loan) ====
On 2 August 2022, it was confirmed that Zeqiri had returned to his home country and joined Swiss Super League side FC Basel on a one season loan. He joined Basel's first team for their 2022–23 season under head coach Alexander Frei and made his debut two days later. The game was in the first leg of the third qualifying round of the 2022–23 UEFA Europa Conference League, an away game on 4 August against danish club Brøndby. He scored his first goal for his new club one week later on 11 August, the return leg in the St. Jakob-Park, as Basel won 3–1 on penalties to qualify for the next round.

Zeqiri played his domestic league debut for the club in the home game on 7 August as Basel played a goalless draw against Young Boys Bern. He scored his first league goal for them in the away game in the Letzigrund on 28 August. In fact he scored two goals as Basel won 4–2 against Zürich. At the end of the season the club decided not to pull the buy out option and the player left the club. During his time with them, Zeqiri played a total of 53 games for Basel scoring a total of 18 goals. 30 of these games were in the Swiss Super League, three in the Swiss Cup, 17 in the UEFA Conference League (where Basel advanced as far as the semi-finals, but here were defeated by Fiorentina) and three were friendly games. He scored 11 goals in the domestic league, one in the cup and six in the European games.

==== Return to Brighton ====
On 24 August 2023, amidst rumors of a departure and interest from other clubs, Zeqiri returned to training with the Albion.

=== Genk ===
On 5 September 2023, Zeqiri signed for Belgian Pro League club Genk on an initial three-year deal with the option for a further twelve months, for a fee reported to be around £2.4 million.

==== Loan to Standard Liège ====
On 6 September 2024, Zeqiri moved on loan to Standard Liège, with an option to buy.

=== Widzew Łódź ===
On 8 September 2025, he transferred to Poland, joining Ekstraklasa side Widzew Łódź on a four-year deal.

==== Second loan to Standard Liège ====
On 1 September 2026, Zeqiri returned to Standard Liège on loan, with an option to make the move permanent.

== International career ==
=== Youth career with Switzerland ===
Since 2013, Zeqiri was part of Switzerland at youth international level, respectively part of the U15, U16, U17, U18, U19, U20 and U21 teams, for whom he made 61 appearances and scored 29 goals.

==== Proposed Kosovo switch ====
On 17 June 2020, Zeqiri's father confirmed that Zeqiri had obtained the Kosovan passport and will start the process of completing the necessary documents, which would allow him to play for Kosovo immediately after the end of the 2021 UEFA European Under-21 Championship with Switzerland U21s. On 26 August 2020, Agim Ademi, president of Football Federation of Kosovo, confirmed that Zeqiri was planned to be called up to Kosovo in September 2020 for the 2020–21 UEFA Nations League matches against Moldova and Greece, but due to problems with documentation, could not be part of the team.

==== European U21 Championships ====
On 15 March 2021, Zeqiri was named as part of the Switzerland U21 squad for 2021 UEFA European Under-21 Championship. He played in all three of Switzerland's group matches, including playing the whole match of the 1–0 victory over England U21 as they finished third in Group D and not qualifying for the knockouts as a result.

=== Pledging future with Switzerland ===
==== Euro 2020 call-up ====
Zeqiri pledged his international career to Switzerland after he was named in Switzerland's 29-man preliminary squad for Euro 2020 on 19 May 2021, this also being his first call-up for the Swiss senior side. The tournament took place in the summer of 2021, postponed from the previous year as a result of Coronavirus. He was an unused substitute in his first match day squad appearance; a 2–1 friendly win at home against the United States on 30 May 2021 in a warm up match for the Euros. A day later he was one of three players cut from the squad for the finals.

He made his national debut on 1 September 2021, coming on as a substitute in the 2–1 friendly victory over Greece at home.

== Personal life ==
Zeqiri was born in Lausanne, Switzerland to Albanian parents from the village Talinoc i Muhaxhirëve of Ferizaj.

== Career statistics ==
=== Club ===
As of match played 23 May 2026

Appearances and goals by club, season and competition
Club	Season	League			National cup (Note: Includes Swiss Cup, FA Cup, DFB-Pokal, Belgian Cup, Polish Cup)		League cup (Note: Includes FA Cup)		Other		Total	
Club	Season	Division	Apps	Goals	Apps	Goals	Apps	Goals	Apps	Goals	Apps	Goals
Lausanne	2014–15	Swiss Challenge League	3	0	0	0	—		—		3	0
Lausanne	2015–16	Swiss Challenge League	14	2	2	1	—		—		16	3
Lausanne	2016–17	Swiss Super League	0	0	1	0	—		—		1	0
Lausanne	2017–18	Swiss Super League	19	2	2	0	—		—		21	2
Lausanne	2018–19	Swiss Challenge League	24	7	1	1	—		—		25	8
Lausanne	2019–20	Swiss Challenge League	33	17	4	5	—		—		37	22
Lausanne	2020–21	Swiss Super League	1	0	1	1	—		—		2	1
Lausanne	Total		94	28	11	8	0	0	0	0	105	36
Brighton & Hove Albion	2020–21	Premier League	9	0	3	0	0	0	—		12	0
Brighton & Hove Albion	2021–22	Premier League	0	0	0	0	1	1	—		1	1
Brighton & Hove Albion	Total		9	0	3	0	1	1	0	0	13	1
FC Augsburg (loan)	2021–22	Bundesliga	22	2	1	0	—		—		23	2
FC Basel (loan)	2022–23	Swiss Super League	30	11	3	1	—		17 (Note: Appearances in UEFA Europa Conference League)	6	50	18
Genk	2023–24	Belgian Pro League	30	7	2	1	—		5	1	37	9
Genk	2024–25	Belgian Pro League	2	0	0	0	—		0	0	2	0
Genk	Total		32	7	2	1	—		5	1	39	9
Standard Liège (loan)	2024–25	Belgian Pro League	24	9	2	1	—		—		26	10
Widzew Łódź	2025–26	Ekstraklasa	24	1	4	2	—		—		28	3
Career total			235	58	26	13	1	1	22	7	284	79

=== International ===
As of match played 18 November 2025

Appearances and goals by national team and year
National team	Year	Apps	Goals
Switzerland	2021	5	0
Switzerland	2022	2	0
Switzerland	2023	4	0
Switzerland	2024	4	1
Switzerland	2025	3	0
Total		18	1

Scores and results list Switzerland's goal tally first, score column indicates score after each Zeqiri goal.

List of international goals scored by Andi Zeqiri
No.	Date	Venue	Opponent	Score	Result	Competition
1	18 November 2024	Estadio Heliodoro Rodríguez López, Santa Cruz de Tenerife, Spain	Spain	2–2	2–3	2024–25 UEFA Nations League A

== Honours ==
Lausanne

- Swiss Challenge League: 2015–16, 2019–20
