= Wouter Burger =

Dutch footballer (born 2001)

Personal information
- Date of birth: 16 February 2001 (age 25)
- Place of birth: Zuid-Beijerland, Netherlands
- Height: 1.91 m (6 ft 3 in)
- Position: Defensive midfielder

Team information
- Current team: TSG Hoffenheim
- Number: 18

Youth career
- 2006–2008: ZBVH
- 2008–2011: VV SHO
- 2011–2013: Excelsior
- 2013–2019: Feyenoord

Senior career*
Years	Team	Apps	(Gls)
2018–2021	Feyenoord	9	(0)
2020	→ Excelsior (loan)	7	(0)
2020–2021	→ Sparta Rotterdam (loan)	18	(2)
2021–2023	Basel	59	(4)
2023–2025	Stoke City	78	(4)
2025–	TSG Hoffenheim	37	(4)

International career
	Netherlands U15	8	(3)
2016–2017	Netherlands U16	9	(4)
2017–2018	Netherlands U17	15	(0)
2018	Netherlands U18	2	(1)
2018–2019	Netherlands U19	16	(4)
2021–2022	Netherlands U21	4	(0)
- * Club domestic league appearances and goals as of 31 October 2026

Wouter Burger (born 16 February 2001) is a Dutch professional footballer who plays as a central or defensive midfielder for German Bundesliga club TSG Hoffenheim.

Burger began his professional career with Feyenoord, making his Eredivise debut in May 2019. after loan spells with Excelsior, and Sparta Rotterdam he moved on to Swiss Super League side Basel in August 2021. After two seasons at St. Jakob-Park, Burger joined English Championship club Stoke City in August 2023 for a fee of £4.3 million. In July 2025, he was transferred to Hoffenheim for an undisclosed fee.

== Club career ==
=== Feyenoord ===
Burger started playing football at amateur club ZBVH in the village of Zuid-Beijerland near Rotterdam. After time at VV SHO and Excelsior, he joined the Feyenoord youth academy. On 30 March 2017, Burger signed his first professional contract at the age of 16. Burger made his first-team debut for Feyenoord on 17 August 2018 in the 2018–19 UEFA Europa League third round qualifiers against AS Trenčín, coming on for Tyrell Malacia in the 83rd minute. On 29 August 2019, Burger scored his first goal in professional football in a 3–0 away win against Hapoel Be'er Sheva for Feyenoord in the play-off round of the 2019–20 UEFA Europa League. In December 2018, he signed another contract extension, keeping him at the club until 2023.

==== Loan to Excelsior ====
Burger was sent on loan to his former youth club Excelsior in the second half of the 2019–20 season. Burger played in seven Eerste Divisie games for Excelsior, before the league was suspended due to the COVID-19 pandemic.

==== Loan to Sparta Rotterdam ====
Ahead of the 2020–21 season, Burger was sent on another loan to a Rotterdam-based club – this time Sparta. Here he made 18 first team appearances in the Eredivisie scoring two goals helping Sparta finish in 7th and qualify for the European competition play-offs where Burger played against his parent club Feynoord in a 2–0 defeat.

=== Basel ===
On 31 August 2021 Swiss Super League club Basel announced that Burger had signed a four-year contract with them. Burger joined Basel's first team during their 2021–22 season under head coach Patrick Rahmen. He made his domestic league debut for his new club on 12 September being substituted in during the away game as Basel played a 1–1 draw against Lugano. In his first season with the club, Burger played 35 domestic league and Conference League matches without scoring a goal. The team ended the league season as runners-up and in the 2021–22 Conference League they advanced to the round of 16.

Burger scored his first goal for the team in the first match of the 2022–23 Swiss Super League season. It was the equaliser in the away game at the Schützenwiese on 16 July 2022 as Basel played a 1–1 draw with Winterthur. It was during the first half of this season in which Burger achieved his best playing performances, especially in the 2022–23 Conference League. This was shown during the first group stage match at home in the St. Jakob-Park on 8 September in which he scored his first brace, as Basel won 3–1 against Pyunik. Basel advanced as far as the semi-finals, but here they were defeated by Fiorentina. In the Super League the team suffered a disappointing season and finished in fifth position.

Soon after the beginning of the next season Burger decided to move on and the club announced his departure on 25 August. During his time with the club he played a total of 104 games for Basel scoring a total of six goals. 59 of these games were in the Swiss Super League, four in the Swiss Cup, 27 in the UEFA Conference League and 14 were friendly games. He scored four goals in the domestic league and the above-mentioned two during the European games.

=== Stoke City ===
On 25 August 2023, Burger signed for EFL Championship club Stoke City on a four-year contract for a fee of £4.3 million. He scored on his full debut for Stoke on 29 August 2023 in a 6–1 win against Rotherham United in the EFL Cup. He scored the only goal of the game against Queens Park Rangers on 14 February 2024. Burger was a key member of the Stoke team in 2023–24, making 41 appearances, scoring four goals as Stoke successfully avoided relegation, finishing in 17th position. Stoke rejected a bid for Burger from Danish club FC Midtjylland in January 2025. Burger was again a regular for Stoke in 2024–25, playing 45 times under three managers as they avoided relegation on the final day.

=== TSG Hoffenheim ===
In July 2025, Burger joined German Bundesliga side TSG Hoffenheim for an undisclosed fee.

== International career ==
With the Netherlands U17 team, Burger participated in the 2018 UEFA European Under-17 Championship in England. The team eventually won the final over Italy after a penalty-shootout. Burger was subsequently included in the UEFA team of the tournament.

== Career statistics ==
As of match played 31 October 2026

Appearances and goals by club, season and competition
Club	Season	League			National cup (Note: Includes FA Cup, KNVB Cup and Swiss Cup)		League cup (Note: Includes EFL Cup)		Europe		Other		Total	
Club	Season	Division	Apps	Goals	Apps	Goals	Apps	Goals	Apps	Goals	Apps	Goals	Apps	Goals
Feyenoord	2018–19	Eredivisie	1	0	1	0	—		1 (Note: Appearance(s) in UEFA Europa League)	0	—		3	0
Feyenoord	2019–20	Eredivisie	6	0	0	0	—		4	1	—		10	1
Feyenoord	2020–21	Eredivisie	1	0	0	0	—		0	0	—		1	0
Feyenoord	2021–22	Eredivisie	1	0	0	0	—		1 (Note: Appearance(s) in UEFA Europa Conference League)	0	—		2	0
Feyenoord	Total		9	0	1	0	—		6	1	—		16	1
Excelsior (loan)	2019–20	Eerste Divisie	7	0	0	0	—		—		—		7	0
Sparta Rotterdam (loan)	2020–21	Eredivisie	18	2	1	0	—		—		1 (Note: Appearance in Eredivisie European competition play-offs)	0	20	2
Basel	2021–22	Swiss Super League	26	0	2	0	—		8	0	—		36	0
Basel	2022–23	Swiss Super League	21	3	2	0	—		12	2	—		35	5
Basel	2023–24	Swiss Super League	3	0	0	0	—		2	0	—		5	0
Basel	Total		50	3	4	0	—		22	2	—		76	5
Stoke City	2023–24	EFL Championship	39	3	1	0	1	1	—		—		41	4
Stoke City	2024–25	EFL Championship	39	1	2	0	4	0	—		—		45	1
Stoke City	Total		78	4	3	0	5	1	—		—		86	5
1899 Hoffenheim	2025–26	Bundesliga	30	4	2	1	—		—		—		32	5
1899 Hoffenheim	2026–27	Bundesliga	7	0	2	1	—		3	0	—		12	1
1899 Hoffenheim	Total		37	4	4	2	—		3	0	—		44	6
Career total			199	13	13	2	5	1	31	3	1	0	249	19

== Honours ==
Feyenoord

- Johan Cruyff Shield: 2018

Netherlands U17

- UEFA European Under-17 Championship: 2018

Individual

- UEFA European Under-17 Championship Team of the Tournament: 2018
