= 2023–24 FC Basel season =

Associan football season

FC Basel
2023–24 season
- Owner: FCB Holding; David Degen
- Club president: Reto Baumgartner
- Head coach: Fabio Celestini
- Ground: St. Jakob-Park
- Swiss Super League: 8th
- Swiss Cup: Quarter-finals
- UEFA Europa Conference League: Second qualifying round
- Top goalscorer: League: Thierno Barry (9); All: Thierno Barry (12)
- Average home league attendance: 21,990
Home colours	Away colours	Third colours

The 2023–24 season was FC Basel's 130th season in their existence and the club's 29th consecutive season in the top flight of Swiss football since their promotion in the 1993–94 season. The 2023–24 Swiss Super League season started in July 2023 and ended in May 2024. In addition to the Swiss Super League, Basel also participated in this season's edition of the Swiss Cup, starting in the third round. Basel also qualified for the 3rd edition of the UEFA Europa Conference League, beginning play in the second qualifying round where they were seeded.

== Club ==
=== FC Basel Holding AG ===
The FC Basel Holding AG owns 75% of FC Basel 1893 AG and the other 25% is owned by the FC Basel 1893 club members. The club FC Basel 1893 functions as a base club independent of the holding company and the AG. FC Basel 1893 AG is responsible for the operational business of the club, e.g. the 1st team, a large part of the youth department and the back office are affiliated there. All decisions that affect the club FC Basel 1893 are made within the AG.

On 20 June 2022 the AGM of the FC Basel Holding AG and the FC Basel 1893 AG were held and the both boards were confirmed. The Holding AG with following members: David Degen (president), Dan Holzmann, Ursula Rey-Krayer and Andreas Rey (vice-president). FC Basel 1893 AG with following members: David Degen (president), Carol Etter (delegate of the club FC Basel), Dan Holzmann, Ursula Rey-Krayer and Andreas Rey (vice-president).

=== Club management ===
The club AGM tool place on 15 May 2023. With the exception of Benno Kaiser, who left the board of directors voluntarily, the entire board was re-elected with large majorities. Kaiser has held various positions on the FCB board since 2009.

The board of directors of the club are:

Club chairman	(Switzerland) Reto Baumgartner
Sports director	(Germany) Heiko Vogel until 31 October 2023
Sports director	(Switzerland) Daniel Stucki from 15 May 2024
Director	(Switzerland) Dominik Donzé
Director	(Switzerland) Carol Etter
Director	(Switzerland) Edward Turner
Director	(Switzerland) Tobias Adler
Ground (capacity and dimensions)	St. Jakob-Park (37,994 (37,500 for international matches) / 120x80 m)

Updated to match played 15 May 2023
Source: FCB Official Site

=== Team management ===
On 28 November 2022 FCB had announced that they had taken Heiko Vogel under contract as their new sporting director, as per 1 January 2023. After the end of their previous season, in which Vogel had taken over in charge of the coaching of their first team following the dismissal of Alexander Frei in February, Vogel continued in his role as sports director for this season.

On 12 May 2023 the club announced that Timo Schultz had been signed a contract as head coach of the new FCB first team. On 22 May they announced that the entire trainer staff had been appointed. Loïc Favé would join Davide Callà as assistant coach and Johannes Wieber would become athletic coach, Gabriel Wüthrich remained goalkeeper coach. On 23 May the club announced that the new coach of the U-21 would be the ex-footballer Dennis Hediger, who had been the coach of the U-18 team the previous season. Appointed a his assistant coaches were Marco Aratore and Michaël Bauch.

On 29 September the club announced that they were parting with coach Schultz, together with his assistant Loïc Favé, and that he would be replaced by the current sport director Heiko Vogel. Vogel was dismissed a month later, on 31 October. The position as head coach was then replaced immediately, with Fabio Celestini taking over until the end of the season. On 17 November 2023, Martin Rueda was hired as an additional assistant coach. The position of the sports director was left vacant.

Soon afterwards on 4 December, a change in the coaching staff of the U-21 team was announced by the club. In the announcement it stated that with immediate effect the club and the current U-21 head coach Dennis Hediger were going their separate ways. The management of the youth department had come to this decision after analyzing the Promotion League first half of the season. The team would be led by the previous U-19 coach Mario Cantaluppi.

The position of the sports director had been left vacant, this until 15 May 2024 and then FCB announced that Daniel Stucki had been appointed as new sports director.

Position	Staff
Head coach	(Germany) Timo Schultz until 29 September 2023
Head coach	(Germany) Heiko Vogel; 29 September–31 October
Head coach	(Switzerland) Fabio Celestini from 31 October
Assistant coach	(Switzerland) Davide Callà
Assistant coach	(Switzerland) Martin Rueda from 17 November 2023
Assistant coach	(France) Loïc Favé until 29 September
Athletics coach	(Switzerland) Johannes Wieber
Goalkeeper coach	(Switzerland) Gabriel Wüthrich
Youth Team U-21 coach	(Switzerland) Dennis Hediger until 4 December
Youth Team U-21 coach	(Switzerland) Mario Cantaluppi from 4 December
Youth Team U-21 co-coach	(Switzerland) Marco Aratore
Youth Team U-21 co-coach	(Switzerland) Michaël Bauch

Source: FCB Official Site

== Overview ==
=== Off and pre-season ===
On 1 June 2023 the club announced the dates for the run into the new season, these were that on 20 June would be the press conference with the new head coach, then on 21 June would be the start for the first team's training and from 24 June until 1 July a summer trainings camp in Seefeld in Tirol in Austria. One of the most interesting statements that the club owners said, was in a radio interview before the new season, and it was that they wanted to keep 90% of the team together that had played so well in the 2022–23 UEFA Europa Conference League.

As the team planning started, the club announced that they would not exercise the purchase options for three players that had been in on loan the previous season. Darian Males, Andi Zeqiri and Kasim Nuhu, therefore, left the club. On 20 June, it was announced that Finn van Breemen had signed in from ADO Den Haag. Then, on 23 June, it was announced that Kaly Sène had left the club, because his contract had not been extended, and that he had signed a contract with Lausanne-Sport. On 30 June, it was announced that Andy Diouf had transferred out to French club Lens. Then, on 3 July, it was announced that Thierno Barry had signed in from Beveren and that Jonathan Dubasin had signed in from Albacete On 12 July, it was announced that Andy Pelmard had transferred out to Clermont Foot. One day later, on 13 July, it was also announced that the loan contract for Sayfallah Ltaief to FC Winterthur would be extended until 30 June 2024. On 17 July, it was published that young talent Liam Chipperfield, who had spent ten years in the FCB youth department would move to Sion. Two days later, on 19 July, it was announced that Zeki Amdouni had transferred to Burnley. The next day the club announced that Bradley Fink would be loaned out to Grasshoppers until 30 June 2024.

By this time ten players had left the club and only three new players had joined, therefore, the news and the publications kept the flow that had been developed in the meantime. On 20 July, FCB announced that they had signed their former youth footballer Dominik Schmid on a three-year contract from Grasshopper Club. On 21 July, it was then announced that three youngsters, Leon Avdullahu, Axel Kayombo and Arlet Junior Zé, who had been part of the FCB U-18 team that had just won the Swiss championship, had signed professional contracts and advanced to the first team. On 25 July, Basel signed in Georgia international Gabriel Sigua from Dinamo Tbilisi on a five-year contract. On 11 August Basel then signes German youth international Maurice Malone from Augsburg on a four-year contract. Then again on the outwards direction, on 14 August, it was announced that Swiss international Dan Ndoye had moved on to Bologna. Again on the inwards direction, during the following days a number of new signings were announced, Austrian international Yusuf Demir on a one-year loan from Galatasaray, Serbian international Đorđe Jovanović on a four-year contract from Maccabi Tel Aviv, Bosnian international Adrian Leon Barišić also on a four-year contract from Osijek, and then Tunisian international Mohamed Dräger on a three-year contract from Nottingham Forest.

Another player who chose to move out was Wouter Burger, he signed for Stoke City on 25 August. Then, on 28 August, Basel announced two new signings, first that of Juan Gauto from Club Atlético Huracán on a five-year deal, and then that of Renato Veiga, on a four-year contract, from Sporting CP. Further players to move out were Riccardo Calafiori definitely to Bologna on 31 August, Liam Millar on loan to Preston North End, Nasser Djiga on loan to Red Star Belgrade. and Emmanuel Essiam on loan to Stade Lausanne Ouchy. The final signing was Kevin Rüegg who came in on a one-year loan from Hellas Verona.

The summary all of which is, 17 players out and 16 players in.

=== Winter break ===
On 23 December, Basel announced that they were loaning Jonathan Dubasin out to Real Oviedo, in the second highest Spanish league, until the end of the season and the loan-contract had a purchase option. They also said that the loan move was primarily for personal reasons. During his time with FCB early in the season, Dubasin was out for a long time on with a ligament injury in his foot. By the winter break he had made eleven appearances in all competitions (ten league, one cup), in which he scored three goals and made one assist. On 26 December 2023, the club announced that they had signed Benjamin Kololli on a free transfer and that he had signed a two-and-a-half-year contract, which contained an option for another year. On 5 January, the club announced that they had signed Nicolas Vouilloz from Servette on a four-and-a-half-year contract, dated up until sommer 2028.

== Players ==
=== First-team squad ===
The following is the list of the Basel first team squad. It also includes players that were in the squad the day the season started on 16 July 2023, but subsequently left the club after that date.

Note: Flags indicate national team as defined under FIFA eligibility rules; some limited exceptions apply. Players may hold more than one non-FIFA nationality.

No.	Pos.	Nation	Player
1	GK	SUI	Marwin Hitz
3	DF	SUI	Nicolas Vouilloz
4	DF	ESP	Arnau Comas
5	DF	SUI	Michael Lang
6	DF	TUN	Mohamed Dräger
7	FW	CAN	Liam Millar (out on loan 30 June 2024)
7	MF	SUI	Benjamin Kololli
8	MF	BEL	Jonathan Dubasin (out, end of loan)
9	FW	FRA	Thierno Barry
10	FW	FRA	Jean-Kévin Augustin
11	FW	GER	Maurice Malone
13	GK	SUI	Mirko Salvi
14	FW	SUI	Bradley Fink (out on loan)
16	GK	SUI	Nils de Mol (U-21)
17	FW	SUI	Andrin Hunziker
18	MF	GHA	Emmanuel Essiam
19	MF	AUT	Yusuf Demir
20	MF	SUI	Fabian Frei (captain)
21	MF	GEO	Gabriel Sigua
22	DF	GER	Sergio López
23	MF	NED	Wouter Burger (out 25 August 2023)
23	FW	SUI	Albian Ajeti

No.	Pos.	Nation	Player
24	DF	BFA	Nasser Djiga (out on loan)
25	DF	SUI	Finn van Breemen
26	DF	BIH	Adrian Leon Barišić
27	MF	SUI	Dan Ndoye (out 14 August 2023)
27	DF	SUI	Kevin Rüegg
28	DF	FRA	Hugo Vogel (U-21)
28	MF	SUI	Dion Kacuri
29	MF	GER	Adriano Onyegbule (U-21)
30	FW	GER	Anton Kade
31	MF	SUI	Dominik Schmid
32	DF	GHA	Jonas Adjetey (U-21)
33	DF	ITA	Riccardo Calafiori (out)
33	MF	ARG	Juan Gauto
34	MF	ALB	Taulant Xhaka (vice-captain)
35	FW	SUI	Roméo Beney (U-21)
37	MF	SUI	Leon Avdullahu (U-21)
38	MF	FRA	Axel Kayombo (U-21)
39	MF	SUI	Arlet Junior Zé (U-21)
40	MF	POR	Renato Veiga
43	GK	GER	Tim Pfeiffer (U-21)
48	FW	FRA	Aaron Akalé (U-21)
99	FW	SRB	Đorđe Jovanović

=== Players out on loan ===
Note: Flags indicate national team as defined under FIFA eligibility rules; some limited exceptions apply. Players may hold more than one non-FIFA nationality.

No.	Pos.	Nation	Player
7	FW	CAN	Liam Millar (to Preston North End until 30 June 2024)
14	FW	SUI	Bradley Fink (to Grasshoppers until 30 June 2024)
18	MF	GHA	Emmanuel Essiam (to Stade Lausanne Ouchy until 12 January 2024)
24	DF	BFA	Nasser Djiga (to Red Star Belgrade until 30 June 2024)
42	MF	TUN	Sayfallah Ltaief (to FC Winterthur until 30 June 2024)
—	GK	SUI	Tim Spycher (to Baden until 30 June 2024)
8	MF	BEL	Jonathan Dubasin (to Real Oviedo from 1 January to 30 June 2024)

=== Players in on loan ===
Note: Flags indicate national team as defined under FIFA eligibility rules; some limited exceptions apply. Players may hold more than one non-FIFA nationality.

No.	Pos.	Nation	Player
19	MF	AUT	Yusuf Demir (on loan from Galatasaray until 30 June 2024)
27	DF	SUI	Kevin Rüegg (on loan from Hellas Verona until 30 June 2024)

=== Transfers summer 2023 ===
In

Note: Flags indicate national team as defined under FIFA eligibility rules; some limited exceptions apply. Players may hold more than one non-FIFA nationality.

No.	Pos.	Nation	Player
6	DF	TUN	Mohamed Dräger (from Nottingham Forest)
8	MF	FRA	Jonathan Dubasin (from Albacete)
9	FW	FRA	Thierno Barry (from Beveren)
11	FW	GER	Maurice Malone (from Augsburg)
17	FW	SUI	Andrin Hunziker (return after loan to Aarau)
21	MF	GEO	Gabriel Sigua (from Dinamo Tbilisi)
25	DF	SUI	Finn van Breemen (from ADO Den Haag)
26	DF	BIH	Adrian Leon Barišić (from Osijek)
31	MF	SUI	Dominik Schmid (from Grasshopper Club)

No.	Pos.	Nation	Player
32	DF	GHA	Jonas Adjetey (U-21)
33	MF	ARG	Juan Gauto (from Club Atlético Huracán)
35	FW	SUI	Roméo Beney (U-21)
37	MF	SUI	Leon Avdullahu (from U-18)
38	MF	FRA	Axel Kayombo (from U-18)
39	MF	SUI	Arlet Junior Zé (from U-18)
40	MF	POR	Renato Veiga (from Sporting CP)
43	GK	GER	Tim Pfeiffer (U-21)
99	FW	SRB	Đorđe Jovanović (from Maccabi Tel Aviv)
—	FW	FRA	Aaron Akalé (U-21)

Out

Note: Flags indicate national team as defined under FIFA eligibility rules; some limited exceptions apply. Players may hold more than one non-FIFA nationality.

No.	Pos.	Nation	Player
8	MF	FRA	Andy Diouf (to Lens)
9	FW	SUI	Zeki Amdouni (to Burnley)
15	DF	GHA	Kasim Nuhu (end of loan, returned to Hoffenheim)
17	FW	SUI	Andi Zeqiri (end of loan, returned to Brighton and Hove Albion)
19	MF	SUI	Darian Males (end of loan, returned to Inter Milan)
21	DF	FRA	Andy Pelmard (to Clermont Foot)
23	MF	NED	Wouter Burger (to Stoke City)

No.	Pos.	Nation	Player
24	FW	SUI	Tician Tushi (end of contract)
26	FW	SEN	Kaly Sène (to Lausanne-Sport)
27	MF	SUI	Dan Ndoye (to Bologna)
33	DF	ITA	Riccardo Calafiori (to Bologna)
40	MF	SUI	Liam Chipperfield (to Sion)
—	FW	SUI	Carmine Chiappetta (to Winterthur)
—	GK	GER	Felix Gebhardt (to Hallescher FC)

=== Transfers winter 2023–24 ===
In

Note: Flags indicate national team as defined under FIFA eligibility rules; some limited exceptions apply. Players may hold more than one non-FIFA nationality.

No.	Pos.	Nation	Player
3	DF	SUI	Nicolas Vouilloz (from Servette)
7	MF	SUI	Benjamin Kololli (from Shimizu S-Pulse)

No.	Pos.	Nation	Player
23	FW	SUI	Albian Ajeti (from Gaziantep)
28	MF	SUI	Dion Kacuri

== Results and fixtures ==
Kickoff times are in CET.

=== Legend ===
Win Draw Loss Postponed

=== Friendly matches ===
==== Pre-season ====
27 June 2023 Friendly	CSKA Sofia	1−0	Basel	Sportplatz, Kematen in Tirol, Austria
13:00	Heintz 47'; Turitsov (yellow card) 59'	FCB report

8 July 2023 Friendly	Vaduz	1−2	Basel	Rheinpark Stadion, Vaduz
14:00	Chabbi 73'	FCB report	34' Frei; 47' Augustin	Attendance: 1,391
Note: Fair game, no yellow cards

16 July 2023 Friendly	Basel	1–3	Benfica	Basel, Switzerland
16:00 WEST (UTC+02:00)	Calafiori (yellow card) 76'; Onyegbule 81'	FCB report	Di María 24'; Ramos 29'; Jurásek 41'; Schjelderup (yellow card) 76'	Stadium: St. Jakob-Park; Attendance: 22,072; Referee: (Switzerland) Mirel Turkes

18 July 2023 Friendly	Old Boys	0−3	Basel	Stadion Schützenmatte, Basel
19:00		FCB report	35' Kade; 39' Kade; 55' Djiga	Attendance: 4,000; Referee: (Switzerland) Hajrim Qovanaj
Note: Fair game, no yellow cards

==== Mid-season ====
8 September 2023 Friendly	Metz	1−1	Basel	Longeville-lès-Metz, France
13:00	Elisor 29'	FCB Report	37' Dubasin	Stadium: Stade Saint-Symphorien
Note: Fair game, no yellow cards

12 October 2023 Friendly	SC Freiburg	2−2	Basel	Freiburg, Germany
14:00	Ginter 62'; Avdullahu 90+2' (o.g.)	FCB report	9' Frei; 19' Gauto; (yellow card) 22' Barry; (yellow card) 24' Lang; (yellow card) 60' Xhaka; (yellow card) 76' Comas; (yellow card) 90' Senaya	Stadium: Training pitch by the Europa-Park Stadion; Attendance: 0 Referee: Matthias Jöllenbeck
Note: Played behind closed doors

17 October 2023 Friendly	FC Bubendorf	0−3	Basel	Brühl, Bubendorf
18:00		Summary	28' (pen.) Frei; 79' Augustin; 85' Augustin	Attendance: 1,000; Referee: Michèle Schmölzer
Note: Fair game, no yellow cards

24 October 2023 Friendly	FC Wallbach-Zeiningen	1–11	Basel	Sportanlage Buhnacker, Wallbach
18:00	Durmaz 72'; Guarda (yellow card) 86'	Summary	9', 42' Augustin; 16', 33' Demir; 18', 36' Kade; 22' Dräger; 35', 39' Jovanović; 81' (pen.) Barry; 84' Malone	Attendance: 1,000; Referee: Hajrim Qovanaj

7 November 2023 Friendly	FC Breitenbach	0–7	Basel	Sportanlage Grien, Breitenbach
18:30		FCB report	14' Lang; 17' Malone; 24' Barry; 28' Dubasin; 31' Malone; 35' Malone; 60' Ulli	Attendance: 3,048; Referee: Desirée Grundbacher
Note: Fair game, no yellow cards

==== Winter break ====
6 January 2024 Friendly	Basel	1–1	Bayern Munich	St. Jakob-Park, Basel
15:30	Avdullahu (yellow card) 45'; Gauto 59'	FC Basel report Bayern report	70' Aséko	Attendance: 36,000 (sold-out); Referee: (Switzerland) Fedayi San (Gebenstorf)

10 January 2024 Friendly	Basel	2–3	Aarau	Buschwilerhof, Basel
15:00	Barry 77'; Ismaili 82'	FCB report	3' Gjorgjev; 45' Demhasaj; (yellow card) 71' Qollaku; 88' Cvetković	Attendance: 700; Referee: (Switzerland) Andrin Borra

14 January 2024 Friendly	Basel	2–2	SpVgg Greuther Fürth	Youth Campus Basel, Münchenstein
16:30	Avdullahu 3'; Avdullahu 31'	FCB report	66' Green; 88' Srbeny	Attendance: 0 Referee: (Switzerland) Urs Schnyder
Note: Behind closed doors, fair game no yellow cards.

==== Mid-season ====
22 March 2024 Friendly	Basel	3–0	Vaduz	Youth Campus Basel, Münchenstein
14:00	Barry 31'; Frei 37'; Augustin 80'	FCB report	(yellow card) 77' Gelmi	Attendance: 0 Referee: (Switzerland) Tobias Thies
Note: Played behind closed doors.

27 April 2024 Friendly	Basel	4–1	La Chaux-de-Fonds	St. Jakob-Park, Basel
14:00	Kololli 8'; Gauto (penalty missed) 18′ Hunziker 37'; Ajeti 55'; Kololli 57'	FCB report	(yellow card) 17' Noundou; 26' (pen.) Cattin; (yellow card) 50' Doutaz	Attendance: 0 Referee: Anojen Kanagasingam (Switzerland)
Note: Played behind closed doors.

=== Swiss Super League ===
The 2023–24 Super League season was the 127th season of top-tier competitive football in Switzerland. The Swiss Football League (SFL) drew and published the fixtures of the first 22 rounds on 21 June 2023, together with the match times for the first eleven rounds.

==== First and second round ====
22 July 2023 Round 1	St. Gallen	2–1	Basel	Kybunpark, St. Gallen
18:00	Görtler (yellow card) 14'; Geubbels 38'; Möller (yellow card) 71'; Akolo (yellow card) 72'; Sutter (yellow card) 77'; Görtler 86'	FCB report	(yellow card) 33' (yellow-red card) 69' Barry; 45' Frei	Attendance: 19,200; Referee: (Switzerland) Fedayi San

30 July 2023 Round 2	Basel	5–2	Winterthur	St. Jakob-Park, Basel
16:30	D. Schmid (yellow card) 35' van Breemen 41'; Millar (yellow card) 55'; Ndoye 58'; Augustin 63'; Frei 90+1'; Frei 90+3' (pen.)	FCB report	8' Di Giusto; (yellow card) 23' Y. Schmid; (yellow card) 33' Sidler; (yellow card) 65' Buess; 80' Stillhart; (yellow card) 87' Schneider	Attendance: 21,370; Referee: (Switzerland) Luca Cibelli

6 August 2023 Round 3	Grasshopper Club	3–1	Basel	Letzigrund, Zürich
16:30	de Carvalho 7'; Morandi 16'; Dadashov 38'	FCB report SFL summary	18' Comas	Attendance: 7,914; Referee: (Switzerland) Luca Piccolo
Note: Fair game, no yellow cards

13 August 2023 Round 4	Basel	1–2	Lausanne-Sport	St. Jakob-Park, Basel
14:15	Hunziker 18'; Burger (yellow card) 71'	FCB report SFL summary	(yellow card) 4' Dussenne; 6' Sène; (yellow card) 44' Sène; (yellow card) 71' Baldé; 90+3' Baldé	Attendance: 20,490; Referee: (Switzerland) Lukas Fähndrich

27 August 2023 Round 5	Lugano	P–P	Basel	Cornaredo, Lugano
14:15

3 September 2023 Round 6	Basel	2–2	Zürich	St. Jakob-Park, Basel
16:30	Veiga 73'; Sigua (yellow card) 78'; Sigua 90+5'; Xhaka (yellow card) 90+6' van Breemen (yellow card) 90+8'	FCB report	(yellow card) 43'; 45' (o.g.) Barišić; 48' Okita (yellow card); (yellow card) 90+3' Santini; (yellow card) 90+8' Guerrero	Attendance: 27,744; Referee: (Switzerland) Fedayi San (Gebenstorf)

24 September 2023 Round 7	Yverdon	3–2	Basel	Stade Municipal, Yverdon-les-Bains
14:15	Tasar 12'; Mahious (yellow card) 20'; Loucif (yellow card) 21'; Liziero 47'; Beyer (yellow card) 77'; Mahious 80'; Corness (yellow card) 82'; Rodrigues (yellow card) 90+3'	FCB report	27' Malone; (yellow card) 36' Demir; (yellow card) 39' Dräger; 87' (pen.) Augustin	Attendance: 4,200 (sold out); Referee: (Switzerland) Lukas Fähndrich

28 September 2023 Round 8	Basel	1–1	Luzern	St. Jakob-Park, Basel
20:30	van Breemen (yellow card) 25'; Jovanović 60'	FCB report	81' Jashari; (yellow card) 90' Beka	Attendance: 20,566; Referee: (Switzerland) Lionel Tschudi (Neuchâtel)

1 October 2023 Round 9	Basel	0–3	Stade Lausanne Ouchy	St. Jakob-Park, Basel
16:30	Jovanović (yellow card) 33'; Veiga (yellow card) 70'; Augustin (yellow card) 70'; Callà (assistant coach) (yellow card) 74'; Comas (red card) 90+5'	FCB report	21' Ajdini; (yellow card) 43' Abdallah; (yellow card) 59' Bamba; 68' Mahmoud; (yellow card) 70' Qarri; 90+4' Qarri; (penalty missed) 90+6′ Danho	Attendance: 21,004; Referee: (Switzerland) Urs Schnyder

8 October 2023 Round 10	Young Boys	3–0	Basel	Stadion Wankdorf, Bern
16:30	Nsame 3'; Niasse (yellow card) 11'; Garcia 39'; Itten 79'; Camara (yellow card) 89'; Benito (yellow card) 90'	FCB report		Attendance: 31,500 (sold out); Referee: (Switzerland) Fedayi San (Gebenstorf)

21 October 2023 Round 11	Basel	0–1	Servette	St. Jakob-Park, Basel
20:30	Barry (yellow card) 46' van Breemen (yellow card) 68'	FCB report	Severin (yellow card) 36'; Severin 63'; Mazikou (yellow card) 77'; Bolla (yellow card) 87'	Attendance: 20,194; Referee: (Switzerland) Lukas Fähndrich

29 October 2023 Round 12	Lausanne-Sport	3–0	Basel	Stade de la Tuilière, Lausanne
14:15	Sène 19' (pen.) 66' (pen.); Sanches 69'; Kablan (red card) 86'; Dussenne (yellow card) 90+6'	FCB report	Xhaka (yellow card) 37'; Veiga (yellow card) 64'; Rüegg (yellow card) 78'; Barišić (yellow card) 90+2'; Demir (yellow card) 90+8'	Referee: (Switzerland) Fedayi San

5 November 2023 Round 13	Basel	2–1	Yverdon	St. Jakob-Park, Basel
16:30	Dräger (yellow card) 2' van Breemen (yellow card) 14'; Dräger 26'; Frei (yellow card) 45+2'; Sigua 85'	FCB report	(yellow card) 24' Del Fabro; (yellow card) 45+2' Tasar; 73' (pen.) Céspedes	Attendance: 19,813; Referee: (Switzerland) Urs Schnyder

12 November 2023 Round 14	Servette	4–1	Basel	Stade de Genève, Geneva
16:30	Guillemenot 45'; Crivelli 60'; Diba (yellow card) 65'; Cognat 81'; Guillemenot 90+3'	FCB report	(red card) 18' Sigua; 21' Xhaka	Attendance: 7,273; Referee: (Switzerland) Sandro Schärer (Buttikon)

26 November 2023 Round 15	Basel	2–0	St. Gallen	St. Jakob-Park, Basel
16:30	Kade 11'; Kade (yellow card) 13'; Xhaka (yellow card) 38' van Breemen 70'	FCB report	(yellow card) 43' Schmidt; (yellow card) 81' Görtler; (yellow card) 90+1' Vallci	Attendance: 24,215; Referee: (Switzerland) Sven Wolfensberger

2 December 2023 Round 16	Stade Lausanne Ouchy	1–1	Basel	Olympique de la Pontaise, Lausanne
18:00	Qarri (yellow card) 20'; Danho (yellow card) 24' (yellow-red card) 75'; Akichi (yellow card) 43'; Gharbi (yellow card) 63'; Qarri 71'; Kadima (yellow card) 90+4'	FCB report	2' Kade; (yellow card) 16' Jovanović; (yellow card) 52' Dräger; (yellow card) 78' Frei	Attendance: 1,740; Referee: (Switzerland) Anojen Kanagasingam

6 December 2023 Round 5	Lugano	1–3	Basel	Cornaredo, Lugano
20:30	Macek (yellow card) 25'; Steffen (yellow card) 49'; Macek 54'; Vladi (yellow card) 77'; Hajrizi (yellow card) 89'; Saipi (yellow card) 89'	FCB report	(yellow card) 18' Schmid; (yellow card) 21' Rüegg; 29' Dubasin; 61' Jovanović; (yellow card) 87' Salvi; (yellow card) 89' Avdullahu; (yellow card) 89' Veiga; 90+2' Beney	Attendance: 3,458; Referee: (Switzerland) Alessandro Dudic

9 December 2023 Round 17	Basel	0–1	Grasshopper	St. Jakob-Park, Basel
18:00	Xhaka (red card) 18'; Frei (yellow card) 19'; Dubasin (yellow card) 64'; Veiga (yellow card) 87'	FCB report SFL summary	(yellow card) 45+5' Hoxha; (yellow card) 47' Tobers; 72' Babunski	Attendance: 21,172; Referee: (Switzerland) Luca Piccolo

17 December 2023 Round 18	Luzern	0–1	Basel	Swissporarena, Luzern
16:30	Meyer (yellow card) 34'; Dorn (yellow card) 69'; Villiger (yellow card) 88'; Frýdek (yellow card) 90+3'; Jaquez (yellow card) 90+3'	FCB report	66' Dubasin; (yellow card) 89' Avdullahu; (yellow card) 90+3' Barry	Attendance: 15,418; Referee: (Switzerland) Alessandro Dudic

21 January 2024 Round 19	Zürich	0–0	Basel	Letzigrund, Zürich
16:30	Kamberi (yellow card) 36'; Krasniqi (yellow card) 56'; Henriksen (head coach) (yellow card) 66'; Okita (yellow card) 74'	FCB report	(yellow card) 20' Schmid; (yellow card) 76' Avdullahu; (yellow card) 83' (yellow-red card) 90+1' Beney; (yellow card) 90+1' (yellow-red card) After final whistle' Celestini (head coach)	Attendance: 20,491; Referee: (Switzerland) Lukas Fähndrich

27 January 2024 Round 20	Basel	1–0	Young Boys	St. Jakob-Park, Basel
20:30	Frei 9'; Kololli (yellow card) 13'; Veiga (yellow card) 52'; Schmid (yellow card) 90+3'	FCB report	(yellow card) 45' Males; (yellow card) 69' Monteiro; (yellow card) 73' Łakomy; (yellow card) 90+3' Amenda	Attendance: 26,410; Referee: (Switzerland) Fedayi San (Gebenstorf)

30 January 2024 Round 21	Winterthur	1–3	Basel	Schützenwiese, Winterthur
20:30	Burkart (yellow card) 28'; Lekaj (yellow card) 49' (yellow-red card) 53'; Schneider (yellow card) 50' (yellow-red card) 56'; Diaby (yellow card) 65'; Lüthi 79'	FCB report	(yellow card) 10' Veiga; 13' Barry; (yellow card) 15' Kade; (yellow card) 51' Vouilloz; 72' Barry; 90+1' Veiga	Attendance: 8,400 (sold out); Referee: (Switzerland) Alessandro Dudic

3 February 2024 Round 22	Basel	0–1	Lugano	St. Jakob-Park, Basel
20:30	Vouilloz (yellow card) 64'	FCB report	69' Steffen; (yellow card) 72' Valenzuela; (yellow card) 81' Bislimi; (yellow card) 89' Žan Celar	Attendance: 20,561; Referee: (Switzerland) Fedayi San (Gebenstorf)

==== Third round ====
11 February 2024 Round 23	Basel	1–0	St. Gallen	St. Jakob-Park, Basel
16:30	Veiga (red card) 46'; Barry 63'	FCB report		Attendance: 21,519; Referee: (Switzerland) Urs Schnyder

17 February 2024 Round 24	Grasshopper Club	2–1	Basel	Letzigrund, Zürich
20:30	Seko (yellow card) 23'; Momoh 29'; Morandi (yellow card) 25' (goal) 36' (pen.); Abels (yellow card) 75' (yellow-red card) 77'; Abrashi (yellow card) 79'	FCB report	38' Schmid	Attendance: 7,025; Referee: (Switzerland) Alessandro Dudic

24 February 2024 Round 25	Yverdon	0–2	Basel	Stade Municipal, Yverdon-les-Bains
18:00	Lungoyi (yellow card) 45+1'; Del Fabro (red card) 79'	FCB report	(yellow card) 30' Sigua; 37' Sigua; (yellow card) 69' Schmid; 83' Barry	Attendance: 3,700; Referee: (Switzerland) Anojen Kanagasingam
Note: 80' Avdullahu with a shot against the cross-bar

2 March 2024 Round 26	Basel	1–2	Lausanne-Sport	St. Jakob-Park, Basel
20:30	Kade (yellow card) 40+4'; Schmid 90+2'	FCB report	9' Bernède; (yellow card) 53' Szalai; (yellow card) 72' Kablan; (yellow card) 79' Dussenne; (yellow card) 85' Diabaté; 88' Loucif	Attendance: 19,959; Referee: (Switzerland) Sven Wolfensberger

10 March 2024 Round 27	Young Boys	5–1	Basel	Stadion Wankdorf, Bern
16:30	Monteiro 2'; Itten 11'; Camara (yellow card) 13'; Elia 16'; Hadjam 46'; Niasse (yellow card) 48'; Monteiro 66'; Hadjam (yellow card) 82'	FCB report	(yellow card) 31' Kololli; 70' Barry	Attendance: 31,500 (sold out); Referee: (Switzerland) Sandro Schärer (Buttikon)

16 March 2024 Round 28	Basel	1–1	Winterthur	St. Jakob-Park, Basel
18:00	Veiga (yellow card) 19'; Diaby 85' (o.g.)	FCB report	(yellow card) 24' Ltaief; 40' Stillhart; (yellow card) 45' Stillhart	Attendance: 21,672; Referee: (Switzerland) Fedayi San (Gebenstorf)

30 March 2024 Round 29	Basel	2–2	Zürich	St. Jakob-Park, Basel
20:30	Avdullahu 27'; Kade 39'; Avdullahu (yellow card) 68'; Frei (yellow card) 70'; Barry (yellow card) 80'	FCB report	6' Kamberi; 54' Condé; (yellow card) 73' Boranijašević; (yellow card) 87' Rohner	Attendance: 29,002; Referee: (Switzerland) Sandro Schärer (Buttikon)

2 April 2024 Round 30	Lugano	2–0	Basel	Cornaredo, Lugano
20:30	Steffen (yellow card) 41'; Hajdari 44'; Macek (yellow card) 52'; Steffen 69'	FCB report	(yellow card) 55' Dräger; (yellow card) 55' Kacuri; (yellow card) 64' Augustin; (yellow card) 66' Kayombo; (yellow card) 67' Frei	Attendance: 3,975; Referee: (Switzerland) Alessandro Dudic

6 April 2024 Round 31	Stade Lausanne Ouchy	0–2	Basel	Olympique de la Pontaise, Lausanne
18:00	Bayard (yellow card) 53'; Camara (yellow card) 90+4'	FCB report	30' Barry; (yellow card) 36' Avdullahu; (yellow card) 59' Beney; 69' Barry	Attendance: 3,250; Referee: (Switzerland) Sven Wolfensberger

14 April 2024 Round 32	Basel	2–1	Servette	St. Jakob-Park, Basel
14:15	Barry (yellow card) 34'; Kade 44'; Barry 45+1'	FCB report	58' Rouiller	Attendance: 25,655; Referee: (Switzerland) Urs Schnyder

21 April 2024 Round 33	Luzern	1–1	Basel	Swissporarena, Luzern
16:30	Grbić 70'; Jashari (yellow card) 78'	FCB report	2' Kade; (yellow card) 41' Kade	Attendance: 15,291; Referee: (Switzerland) Sandro Schärer (Buttikon)

==== League table at split ====
Pos	Team	Pld	W	D	L	GF	GA	GD	Pts	Qualification or relegation
1	Young Boys	33	19	8	6	67	32	+35	65	Advance to championship group
2	Lugano	33	18	5	10	61	44	+17	59	Advance to championship group
3	Servette	33	16	9	8	53	38	+15	57	Advance to championship group
4	St. Gallen	33	14	8	11	53	44	+9	50	Advance to championship group
5	Winterthur	33	13	10	10	55	56	−1	49	Advance to championship group
6	Zürich	33	12	12	9	44	35	+9	48	Advance to championship group
7	Luzern	33	12	8	13	41	46	−5	44	Enter relegation group
8	Lausanne-Sport	33	10	10	13	43	48	−5	40	Enter relegation group
9	Basel	33	11	7	15	41	51	−10	40	Enter relegation group
10	Yverdon-Sport	33	11	7	15	43	64	−21	40	Enter relegation group
11	Grasshopper Club	33	8	6	19	35	45	−10	30	Enter relegation group
12	Lausanne Ouchy	33	5	8	20	33	66	−33	23	Enter relegation group

Updated to match(es) played on 21 April 2024. Source: RSSSF and Swiss Super League
Rules for classification: 1) Points; 2) Goal difference; 3) Goals scored; 4) Head-to-head goal difference; 5) Head-to-head goals scored 6) Away goals scored; 7) Draw.

==== Split ====
After 33 matches, the league was split into two groups of six teams. The top six were grouped into the championship group and the bottom six into the relegation group, with the teams playing every other team in their group once in a single round robin (either at home or away). The exact matches were determined by the position of the teams in the league table at the time of the split.

==== Relegation group ====
5 May 2024 Round 34	Basel	1–1	Luzern	St. Jakob-Park, Basel
14:15	Barry (yellow card) 15'; Avdullahu (yellow card) 43'; Barry 52'; Kade (yellow card) 54'; Rüegg (yellow card) 86'	FCB report	46' Meyer; (yellow card) 62' Dorn; (yellow card) 69' Jashari; (yellow card) 78' Winkler	Attendance: 21,230; Referee: Alessandro Dudic (Switzerland)

10 May 2024 Round 35	Lausanne-Sport	0–0	Basel	Stade de la Tuilière, Lausanne
20:30	Custodio (yellow card) 44'; Bernède (yellow card) 52'	FCB report	(yellow card) 58' Rüegg; (yellow card) 63' Kacuri	Attendance: 7,136; Referee: Luca Cibelli (Switzerland)

14 May 2024 Round 36	Basel	2–0	Stade Lausanne Ouchy	St. Jakob-Park, Basel
20:30	Xhaka (yellow card) 45+6'; Schmid (yellow card) 49'; Ajeti 52'; Dräger 90+6'	FCB report	(yellow card) 43' Gharbi; (yellow card) 45+6' Vachoux; (yellow card) 49' Pos	Attendance: 17,319; Referee: Johannes von Mandach (Switzerland)

18 May 2024 Round 37	Grasshopper Club	0–1	Basel	Letzigrund, Zürich
18:00	Morandi (yellow card) 39'; Tobers (yellow card) 42'; Babunski (yellow card) 73'	FCB report	90+4' Frei	Attendance: 8,297; Referee: Mirel Turkes (Switzerland); Assistant referees: Sven Wolfensberger (VAR) (Switzerland)

21 May 2024 Round 38	Basel	0–0	Yverdon-Sport	St. Jakob-Park, Basel
20:30	Barry (penalty missed) 8′ van Breemen (yellow card) 23'; Schmid (yellow card) 32'; Barry (yellow card) 38'	FCB report	(yellow card) 49' Gunnarsson; (yellow card) 57' Kamenović; (yellow card) 68' Céspedes; (yellow card) 81' Aké	Attendance: 17,920; Referee: Luca Piccolo (Switzerland)

==== Final league table ====
Pos	Team	Pld	W	D	L	GF	GA	GD	Pts	Qualification or relegation (Note: Teams play each other three times (33 matches), before the league is split into two groups (the top six and the bottom six).)
1	Young Boys (C)	38	23	8	7	76	34	+42	77	Qualification for the Champions League play-off round
2	Lugano	38	20	5	13	67	51	+16	65	Qualification for the Champions League second qualifying round
3	Servette	38	18	10	10	59	43	+16	64	Qualification for the Europa League third qualifying round (Note: Servette qualified for the Europa League third qualifying round as the 2023–24 Swiss Cup winners.)
4	Zürich	38	16	12	10	53	41	+12	60	Qualification for the Conference League second qualifying round
5	St. Gallen	38	16	9	13	60	51	+9	57	Qualification for the Conference League second qualifying round
6	Winterthur	38	13	10	15	60	71	−11	49	
7	Luzern	38	13	10	15	47	53	−6	49	
8	Basel	38	13	10	15	45	52	−7	49	
9	Yverdon-Sport	38	13	8	17	50	71	−21	47	
10	Lausanne-Sport	38	11	12	15	48	53	−5	45	
11	Grasshopper Club (O)	38	10	8	20	41	49	−8	38	Qualification for the Relegation play-off
12	Lausanne Ouchy (R)	38	7	8	23	40	77	−37	29	Relegation to 2024–25 Swiss Challenge League

Source: RSSSF and Swiss Super League
Rules for classification: 1) Points; 2) Goal difference; 3) Goals scored; 4) Head-to-head goal difference; 5) Head-to-head goals scored 6) Away goals scored; 7) Draw.
(C) Champions; (O) Play-off winners; (R) Relegated

=== Swiss Cup ===
The matches of the first round were drawn on 3 July 2023. Representatives of the Swiss Football League (SL and ChL) could not be drawn against each other. Furthermore, in the first round, the matchups are regionally restricted. Home advantage was granted to the team from the lower league.

20 August 2023 Round 1	FC Saint-Blaise	1–8	Basel	La Fongière, Saint-Blaise
14:00	Toitot 15'; Economidis (yellow card) 62'; Pennarossa (yellow card) 74'	FCB report ASF/SFV summary	9' Millar; 21' Millar; 30' Malone; 36' Djiga; 41' van Breemen; 51' Hunziker; 63' (pen.) Jovanović; 68' Zé	Attendance: 3,600; Referee: (Switzerland) Lionel Tschudi (Neuchâtel)

16 September 2023 Round 2	FC Bosporus	0–8	Basel	Fussballfeld Wyler, Bern
19:30	Mulaj (yellow card) 32'; Rebronja (yellow card) 54'; Eryilmaz (yellow card) 64'	FCB report ASF/SFV summary	4' Malone; 11' Jovanović; 33' Demir; 54' Gauto; 72' Gauto; 86' Dubasin; 87' Avdullahu; 90' Jovanović	Attendance: 3,500; Referee: (Switzerland) David Huwiler

31 October 2023 Round 3	Kriens	0–1	Basel	Stadion Kleinfeld, Kriens
20:30	Riedmann (yellow card) 38'; Uruejoma (yellow card) 41'	FCB report ASF/SFV summary	42' Jovanović; (yellow card) 82' Xhaka	Attendance: 3,500 (sold out); Referee: (Switzerland) David Schärli

28 February 2024 Quarter-final	Basel	2–2 (a.e.t.) (3–4 p)	Lugano	St. Jakob-Park, Basel
tbd	Barišić (yellow card) 14'; Schmid (yellow card) 27'; Sigua (yellow card) 28'; Barry 81'; Barry 83'; Vouilloz (yellow card) 90+3'; Avdullahu (yellow card) 113'; Beney (yellow card) 117'	FCB report	6' Celar; 15' (pen.)Celar; (yellow card) 26' Hajdari; (yellow card) 48' Mahmoud; (yellow card) 54' Hajrizi; (yellow card) 70' Sabbatini	Attendance: 17,975; Referee: (Switzerland) Luca Cibelli
	Penalties
	Veiga (penalty scored); Frei (penalty missed); Jovanović (penalty scored); Barry (penalty scored); Schmid (penalty missed)		(penalty scored) Valenzuela; (penalty scored) Vladi; (penalty scored) Sabbatini; (penalty scored) Mahou

=== UEFA Europa Conference League ===
==== Second qualifying round ====
The draw for the second qualifying round was held on 21 June 2023.

27 July 2023 1st leg	Basel (Switzerland)	1–3	(Kazakhstan) Tobol	St. Jakob-Park, Basel
19:30	Barry 25'; Calafiori (yellow card) 45+1' (yellow-red card) 68'; Barry (red card) 56'	FCB report UEFA summary	(yellow card) 44' Ilić; (yellow card) 45+1' Zharynbetov; 57' (pen.) Déblé; 62' Orazov; 71' Chesnokov	Attendance: 12,287; Referee: Gustavo Correia (Portugal)

3 August 2023 2nd leg	(Kazakhstan) Tobol	1–2 (4–3 agg.)	Basel (Switzerland)	Central Stadium, Kostanay
16:00	Vukadinović (yellow card) 10'; Déblé 43' (pen.); Chesnokov (yellow card) 59'; Asrankulov (yellow card) 82'	FCB report UEFA summary	26' Kade; 32' (pen.) Augustin; (yellow card) 45' Frei; (yellow card) 76' Comas; (yellow card) 87' Augustin	Attendance: 8,420; Referee: Lazar Lukić (Serbia)

== See also ==
- History of FC Basel
- List of FC Basel players
- List of FC Basel seasons

== Sources ==
- FCB squad 2023–24 at fcb-archiv.ch
- Switzerland 2023–24 at RSSSF
