= Leon Avdullahu =

Kosovan footballer (born 2004)

Personal information
- Date of birth: 23 February 2004 (age 22)
- Place of birth: Solothurn, Switzerland
- Height: 1.85 m (6 ft 1 in)
- Position: Midfielder

Team information
- Current team: TSG Hoffenheim
- Number: 7

Youth career
- 2012–2013: FC Gerlafingen
- 2013–2018: Solothurn
- 2018–2023: Basel

Senior career*
Years	Team	Apps	(Gls)
2022–2024	Basel U21	35	(0)
2023–2025	Basel	63	(2)
2025–	TSG Hoffenheim	41	(1)

International career^{‡}
2019–2020	Switzerland U15	4	(0)
2019–2020	Switzerland U16	3	(0)
2019–2021	Switzerland U18	4	(1)
2021–2023	Switzerland U19	5	(0)
2023–2025	Switzerland U21	6	(0)
2025–	Kosovo	13	(0)
- * Club domestic league appearances and goals as of 31 October 2026 ‡ National team caps and goals as of 16:10, 18 November 2026 (UTC)

Leon Avdullahu (born 23 February 2004) is a professional footballer who plays as a midfielder for German Bundesliga club TSG Hoffenheim. Born in Switzerland, he represented that nation at youth international levels but in 2025 switched to play for Kosovo national team.

== Club career ==
Born in Solothurn, Avdullahu started his youth football with local club FC Gerlafingen and then moved to Solothurn in 2013. In the summer of 2018, he moved to Basel's youth department and in 2022 he advanced to their U-21 team, but remained part of the U-18 team that celebrated winning the Swiss championship at the end of June 2023. In July 2023 he signed his first professional contract and advanced to their first team for their 2023–24 season.

After playing in three test games Avdullahu played his domestic league debut for the club in the home game in the St. Jakob-Park on 13 August 2023 as Basel were defeated 2–1 by Lausanne-Sport. In the 2023–24 Swiss Cup second round match, on 16 September, Avdullahu scored his first goal for the team as Basel went on to win 8–0 against amateur club FC Bosporus in Bern.

As Fabio Celestini became FCB head-coach, Avdullahu became a regular starter. He scored his first league goal for the team on 30 March 2024 in the home game in the St. Jakob-Park as Basel played a 2–2 draw with Zürich. At the end of the 2024–25 Swiss Super League season he became Swiss champion and Cup winner with them. On 12 June FC Basel 1893 announced that their former youth player Avdullahu was moving to TSG Hoffenheim in the German Bundesliga. During his two seasons with FCB's first team, Avdullahu played a total of 71 games for them scoring a total of three goals. 63 of these games were in the Swiss Super League and 8 in the Swiss Cup. He scored two goals in the domestic league and the other in the cup.

On 12 June 2025, German Bundesliga side TSG Hoffenheim announced the signing of Avdullahu on a long-term contract.

== International career ==
Born and raised in Switzerland, Avdullahu is of Albanian origin and his family hails from the town of Kamenica, Kosovo. From 2019, until 2025, he has been part of Switzerland at youth international level, respectively has been part of the U15, U16, U18, U19 and U21 teams and he with these teams played 22 matches and scored one goal.

On 22 June 2025, Avdullahu met with the president of the Football Federation of Kosovo, Agim Ademi, which was seen as a possible indication of his interest in representing Kosovo at the international level. Following the meeting, reports emerged that he might switch his allegiance to Albania and that he had received a call-up for the September matches; however, the authenticity of the reported invitation was later disputed.

On 25 August 2025, Avdullahu decided to represent Kosovo at the international level, a decision confirmed through a Facebook post by the president of the Football Federation of Kosovo, Agim Ademi. Four days later, he accepted their call-up for the 2026 FIFA World Cup qualification matches against Switzerland and Sweden. On 2 September 2025, Avdullahu's request to switch international allegiance to Kosovo was approved by FIFA. His debut with Kosovo came three days later in the 2026 FIFA World Cup qualification match against Switzerland after being named in the starting line-up.

== Career statistics ==
=== Club ===
As of match played 31 October 2026

Appearances and goals by club, season and competition
Club	Season	League			National cup		Europe		Other		Total	
Club	Season	Division	Apps	Goals	Apps	Goals	Apps	Goals	Apps	Goals	Apps	Goals
Basel U21	2021–22	Swiss Promotion League	7	0	—		—		—		7	0
Basel U21	2022–23	Swiss Promotion League	25	0	—		—		—		25	0
Basel U21	2023–24	Swiss Promotion League	3	0	—		—		—		3	0
Basel U21	Total		35	0	—		—		—		35	0
Basel	2023–24	Swiss Super League	28	1	4	1	0	0	—		32	2
Basel	2024–25	Swiss Super League	35	1	4	0	—		—		39	1
Basel	Total		63	2	8	1	0	0	—		71	3
TSG Hoffenheim	2025–26	Bundesliga	33	0	2	0	—		—		35	0
TSG Hoffenheim	2026–27	Bundesliga	8	1	2	0	3 (Note: Appearances in UEFA Europa League)	0	—		13	1
TSG Hoffenheim	Total		41	1	4	0	3	0	—		48	1
Career total			139	3	12	1	3	0	0	0	154	4

=== International ===
As of match played 17 November 2026

Appearances and goals by national team and year
National team	Year	Apps	Goals
Kosovo
Kosovo	2025	5	0
Kosovo	2026	8	0
Total		13	0

== Honours ==
Basel

- Swiss U18 Championship: 2023
- Swiss Super League: 2024–25
- Swiss Cup: 2024–25
