= Nasser Djiga =

Burkinabé footballer (born 2002)

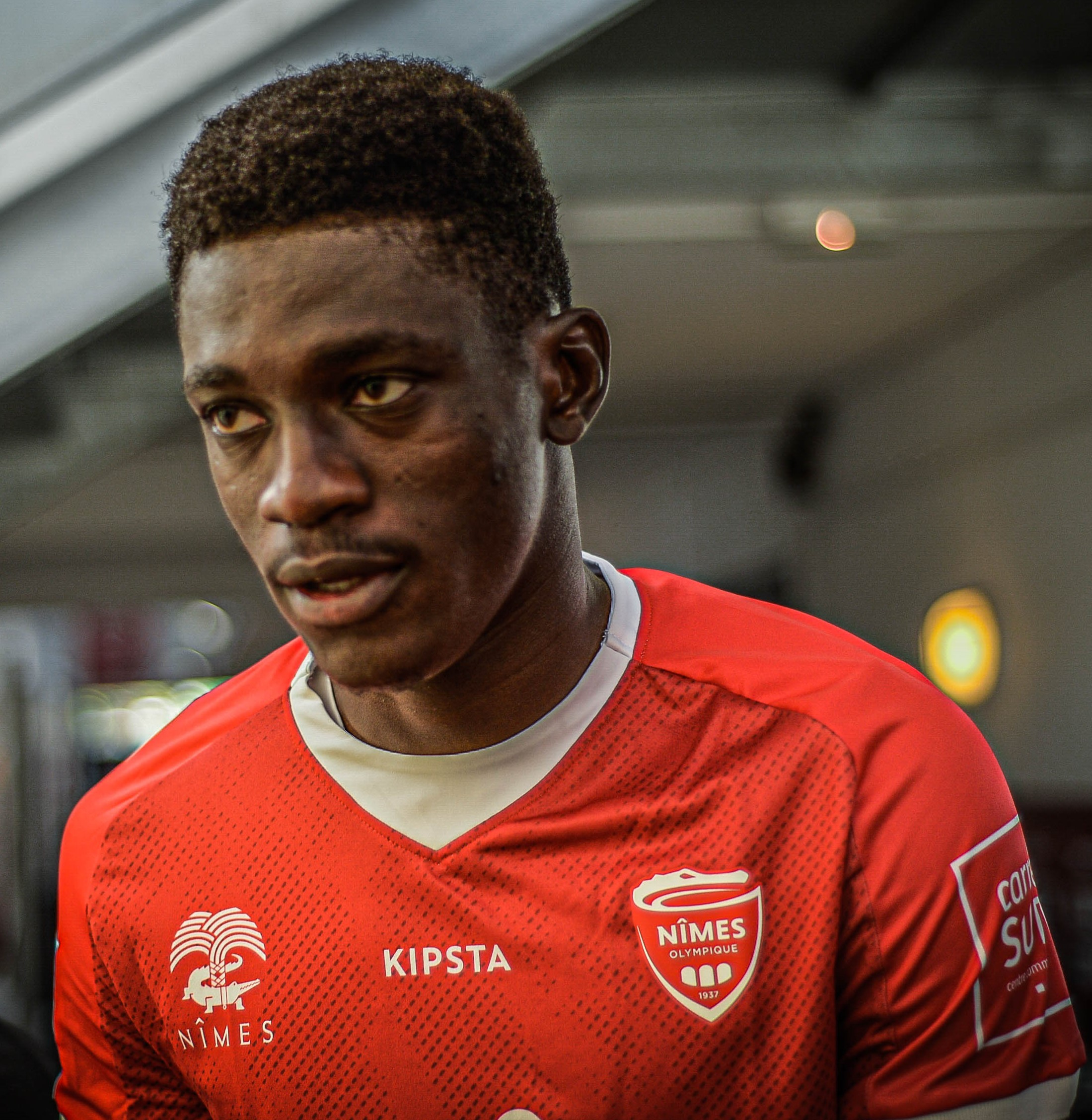
- Djiga with Nîmes in 2022

Personal information
- Full name: Yacouba Nasser Djiga
- Date of birth: 15 November 2002 (age 24)
- Place of birth: Bobo-Dioulasso, Burkina Faso
- Height: 1.92 m (6 ft 4 in)
- Position: Centre-back

Team information
- Current team: Wolverhampton Wanderers
- Number: 34

Youth career
- –2019: Vitesse

Senior career*
Years	Team	Apps	(Gls)
2019–2021	Vitesse	40	(1)
2021–2024	Basel	11	(0)
2022–2023	→ Nîmes (loan)	21	(0)
2023–2024	→ Red Star Belgrade (loan)	22	(1)
2024–2025	Red Star Belgrade	17	(2)
2025–	Wolverhampton Wanderers	5	(0)
2025–2026	→ Rangers (loan)	25	(0)

International career^{‡}
2021	Burkina Faso U20	4	(0)
2022–	Burkina Faso	15	(1)
- * Club domestic league appearances and goals as of 10:46, 6 August 2026 (UTC) ‡ National team caps and goals as of 31 March 2026

Yacouba Nasser Djiga (born 15 November 2002) is a Burkinabé professional footballer who plays as a centre-back for EFL Championship club Wolverhampton Wanderers, and the Burkina Faso national team.

== Club career ==
=== Early career ===
Djiga played his youth football with Vitesse in Burkina Faso. After having received various call-ups to their first team and having made his team debut during the last games of the 2018–19 season, he advanced to their squad in the 2019–20 season. Djiga played 14 games for them, scoring one goal, in the Deuxième Division the second tier of football in Burkina Faso. Despite the season remaining uncompleted due to the COVID-19 pandemic, because the team were league leaders, they won promotion to the Burkinabé Premier League. In the following season, Djiga was regular starter in the team. He received a calls-up to the Burkina Faso U20 team and played four games for them in the 2021 Africa U-20 Cup of Nations.

=== Basel ===
During the transfer window in the summer of 2021, Djiga signed for Swiss top flight side Basel, despite receiving interest from Lille in the French Ligue 1, as well as Belgian and Spanish clubs. Basel announced his signing on 19 June.

Djiga joined Basel's first team for their 2021–22 season under head coach Patrick Rahmen. After having played in five test games, on 29 July 2021 Djiga debuted for them during a 2–0 away win over Partizani in the second qualifying round of the 2021–22 UEFA Europa Conference League. Unfortunately Djiga injured himself during the game and was forced out for six weeks with a capsular ligament injury in the left ankle. He returned to the team on 19 September to play the Swiss Cup match against armature team FC Rorschach-Goldach. On 24 October Djiga then played his Swiss Super League debut for his new club in the home game at St. Jakob-Park as Basel won 2–0 against Lugano, where he played the entire game. During that season, Djiga played just six domestic league matches, three in the Conference League and two in the Swiss Cup, but he also had six appearances in their U-21 team who played in the 2021–22 Promotion League, the third tier of Swiss football.

==== Loan to Nîmes and return to Basel ====
On 28 August 2022, Djiga joined Nîmes in France on a season-long loan.

Following his loan, Djiga returned to Basel and played, under their new head coach Timo Schultz mainly as substitute, in the first four domestic league games of the season as well as both games in the Conference League games. On 20 August 2023, he played in their starting eleven as the team played their first round Cup match against lower-level opponents Saint-Blaise. He scored his first goal for his club in this game; it was the team's fourth goal, as they went on to win 8–1.

=== Red Star Belgrade ===
On 4 September, Basel announced that Djiga had been loaned out to Red Star Belgrade.

In his first season with them, Red Star became 2023–24 Serbian SuperLiga champions and won the 2023–24 Serbian Cup. On 17 May 2024, it was announced that the club had exercised their option and signed the player over on a permanent deal.

=== Wolverhampton Wanderers ===
On 3 February 2025, Djiga joined Premier League club Wolverhampton Wanderers, signing a contract until 2030.

==== Loan to Rangers ====
On 9 July 2025, Wolves announced that Djiga had been loaned to Rangers for the duration of the 2025–26 season. On 22 July 2025, he made his debut for Rangers in a UEFA Champions League qualifier against Panathinaikos at Ibrox.

== International career ==
Djiga made his debut for the Burkina Faso national team in a 5–0 friendly loss to Kosovo on 24 March 2022.

On 20 December 2023, he was selected from the list of 27 Burkinabé players by Hubert Velud to compete in the 2023 Africa Cup of Nations.

On 8 December 2025, Djiga was named among the 25 players selected by head coach Brama Traoré to represent Burkina Faso at the 2025 Africa Cup of Nations.

== Career statistics ==
=== Club ===
As of match played 21 March 2026

Appearances and goals by club, season and competition
Club	Season	League			National cup (Note: Includes Swiss Cup, Serbian Cup, FA Cup, Scottish Cup)		League cup (Note: Includes Scottish League Cup)		Europe		Total	
Club	Season	Division	Apps	Goals	Apps	Goals	Apps	Goals	Apps	Goals	Apps	Goals
Basel U21	2021–22	Swiss Promotion League	6	0	—		—		—		6	0
Basel	2021–22	Swiss Super League	6	0	2	0	—		3 (Note: Appearances in UEFA Europa Conference League)	0	11	0
Basel	2022–23	Swiss Super League	1	0	1	0	—		2	0	4	0
Basel	2023–24	Swiss Super League	4	0	1	1	—		2	0	7	1
Basel	Total		11	0	4	1	—		7	0	22	1
Nîmes (loan)	2022–23	Ligue 2	21	0	0	0	—		—		21	0
Red Star Belgrade	2023–24	Serbian SuperLiga	22	1	1	0	—		6 (Note: Appearances in UEFA Champions League)	0	29	1
Red Star Belgrade	2024–25	Serbian SuperLiga	17	2	0	0	—		10	1	27	3
Red Star Belgrade	Total		39	3	1	0	—		16	1	56	4
Wolverhampton Wanderers	2024–25	Premier League	5	0	1	0	—		—		6	0
Rangers (loan)	2025–26	Scottish Premiership	18	0	3	0	2	0	12 (Note: Six appearances in UEFA Champions League, six appearances in UEFA Europa League)	0	35	0
Career total			100	3	9	1	2	0	35	1	146	5

=== International ===
As of match played 31 March 2026

Appearances and goals by national team and year
National team	Year	Apps	Goals
Burkina Faso	2022	2	0
Burkina Faso	2024	7	1
Burkina Faso	2025	4	0
Burkina Faso	2026	2	0
Total		15	1

Scores and results list Burkina Faso's goal tally first, score column indicates score after each Djiga goal.

List of international goals scored by Nasser Djiga
No.	Date	Venue	Opponent	Score	Result	Competition	Ref.
1	26 March 2024	Berrechid Municipal Stadium, Berrechid, Morocco	Niger	1–0	1–1	Friendly	

== Honours ==
Red Star Belgrade

- Serbian SuperLiga: 2023-24, 2024–25
- Serbian Cup: 2023–24, 2024–25
