= Finn van Breemen =

Dutch footballer (born 2003)

Personal information
- Date of birth: 25 February 2003 (age 23)
- Place of birth: Pijnacker, Netherlands
- Height: 1.93 m (6 ft 4 in)
- Position: Centre-back

Team information
- Current team: Famalicão
- Number: 4

Youth career
- 2007–2010: OLIVEO
- 2010–2012: DHC
- 2012–2022: ADO Den Haag

Senior career*
Years	Team	Apps	(Gls)
2022–2023	ADO Den Haag	19	(0)
2023–2026	Basel	46	(2)
2025–2026	Basel II	5	(0)
2026–	Famalicão	1	(0)

International career^{‡}
2023–2025	Netherlands U21	6	(0)
- * Club domestic league appearances and goals as of 7 August 2026 ‡ National team caps and goals as of 25 March 2025

Finn van Breemen (born 25 February 2003) is a Dutch professional footballer who plays a centre-back for Portuguese Primeira Liga club Famalicão.

== Club career ==
Van Breemen joined the academy at ADO Den Haag in 2012. He is a left footed central defender who can also play at left back although that is not his favourite position. He made his Eerste Divisie debut on the 6 May 2022 against FC Emmen. He described it as a “dream come true” but acknowledged the step up in pace and the change in atmosphere from youth age football. June 2022, he signed his first contract with ADO Den Haag, which would have kept him with the club until the summer of 2024, with the option of an extra year.

On 20 June 2023, van Breemen signed for Swiss Super League club Basel on a four-year deal. He joined Basel's first team for their 2023–24 season under head coach Timo Schultz. After playing in three test games van Breemen played his domestic league debut for the club in the away game in the Kybunpark on 22 July as Basel were defeated 2–1 by St. Gallen. He immediately became regular starter and remained regular in, the starting eleven even after the change of head coach to Fabio Celestini. He scored his first goal for his new team in the home game in the St. Jakob-Park on 30 July. It was his team's first goal of the match, in the 41st minute, as Basel went on to win 5–2 against Winterthur.

== International career ==
He featured for the Netherlands national under-21 football team in their 2–0 win over North Macedonia U21 on 12 September 2023 in a UEFA European Championship U21 qualification game.

== Honours ==
Basel

- Swiss Super League: 2024–25

== Career statistics ==
=== Club ===
As of match played 10 May 2024

Appearances and goals by club, season and competition
Club	Season	League			National Cup		League Cup		Europe		Other		Total	
Club	Season	Division	Apps	Goals	Apps	Goals	Apps	Goals	Apps	Goals	Apps	Goals	Apps	Goals
ADO Den Haag	2021–22	Eerste Divisie	1	0	0	0	—		—		—		1	0
ADO Den Haag	2022–23	Eerste Divisie	18	0	3	0	—		—		—		21	0
ADO Den Haag	Total		19	0	3	0	—		—		—		22	0
Basel	2023–24	Swiss Super League	27	2	2	1	—		2 (Note: Appearances in UEFA Europa Conference League)	0	—		31	3
Career total			46	2	5	1	0	0	2	0	0	0	53	3
