= Arnau Comas =

Spanish footballer (born 2000)

Personal information
- Full name: Arnau Comas Feixas
- Date of birth: 11 April 2000 (age 26)
- Place of birth: Cassà de la Selva, Spain
- Height: 1.91 m (6 ft 3 in)
- Position: Centre-back

Team information
- Current team: Deportivo A Coruña
- Number: 3

Youth career
- –2010: Girona
- 2010–2019: Barcelona

Senior career*
Years	Team	Apps	(Gls)
2019–2022	Barcelona B	55	(2)
2019–2020	→ Olot (loan)	16	(0)
2022–2025	Basel	25	(3)
2025	→ Eibar (loan)	9	(0)
2025–	Deportivo A Coruña	24	(0)

International career^{‡}
2022	Spain U21	1	(0)
- * Club domestic league appearances and goals as of 31 May 2026 ‡ National team caps and goals as of 18 November 2022

Arnau Comas Feixas (born 11 April 2000) is a Spanish professional footballer who plays as a centre-back for Deportivo de A Coruña.

== Club career ==
Born in Cassà de la Selva, Girona, Catalonia, Comas played his youth football with local club Girona. In 2010 he moved to the youth department of Barcelona, advancing regularly through the ranks and from July 2017 played for Barcelona Juvenil A who that season won their group in the 2017–18 División de Honor Juvenil de Fútbol, but after a quarter-final success were eliminated in the semi-finals by Sporting Gijón A. They also played in the 2017–18 UEFA Youth League and eventually won the tournament, winning the final 3–0 against Chelsea, however, Comas did not play in the final.

Comas started his professional career with Spanish La Liga side Barcelona graduating to Barcelona B in 2019. In 2019, he was sent on loan to Olot in the Spanish third tier. Returning to Barcelona B after the loan he achieved 55 league appearances for them in the next two seasons.

Comas moved to Switzerland and joined FC Basel's first team for their 2022–23 season signing a four-year contract, until summer 2026, under head coach Alexander Frei. Comas played his debut for his new club in the home game in the St. Jakob-Park on 21 July 2022, as in the second qualifying round of the 2022–23 UEFA Europa Conference League, Basel played a 2–0 win over the Irish team Crusaders. Three day later he played his domestic league debut for his new team in the home game as Basel played a 1–1 draw against Servette. He scored his first goal for the team in the home game on 23 October. In fact he scored the team's first and second goal in the 2nd and 8th minute as Basel went on to win 3–1 against Winterthur. Comas had immediately become a regular starter in the team and by the winter break he had had 13 appearances in the domestic league and 12 appearances in the Conference League. However, the defender suffered a muscle injury during the trainings camp in Marbella in January. On 5 April the club announced, that after initial improvement, it turned out that the injury was more serious than originally thought and was taking significantly longer than initially hoped. Comas did not play again that season.

Comas recovered in time for the beginning of their 2023–24 season under new head coach Timo Schultz. However he suffered an injury to his left lateral meniscus in match the against Servette on 23 October and was substituted out after just four minutes. The next day the club announced that the Spaniard underwent successful surgery that morning and that the tear had been stitched. Unfortunately, Comas would be out for several months.

On 31 January 2025, Comas joined Eibar on loan with an option to buy. On 4 July, he signed a three-year contract with Deportivo de La Coruña.

== International ==
Comas played his debut for the Spanish U-21 team as they beat Japan U-21 2–0 on 18 November 2022.

== Titles and Honours ==
- UEFA Youth League: 2017–18
