= Jonathan Dubasin =

Belgian footballer

Personal information
- Date of birth: 2 February 2000 (age 26)
- Place of birth: La Seu d'Urgell, Spain
- Height: 1.80 m (5 ft 11 in)
- Position: Winger

Team information
- Current team: Osasuna

Youth career
- 2012–2017: Andorra
- 2017–2018: Atlètic Segre
- 2018–2019: Girona

Senior career*
Years	Team	Apps	(Gls)
2019–2022	Girona	0	(0)
2019–2020	→ Figueres (loan)	22	(5)
2020–2021	→ Llagostera (loan)	22	(3)
2021–2022	→ Logroñés (loan)	35	(10)
2022–2023	Albacete	39	(10)
2023–2025	Basel	10	(2)
2024	→ Oviedo (loan)	19	(0)
2024–2025	→ Sporting Gijón (loan)	37	(8)
2025–2026	Sporting Gijón	37	(16)
2026–	Osasuna	12	(0)

International career
2019	Belgium U19		
- * Club domestic league appearances and goals as of 7 November 2026

Jonathan Dubasin (born 2 February 2000) is a footballer who plays as a left winger for Spanish club CA Osasuna. Born in Spain, he represented Belgium at under-19 level.

== Club career ==
Born in La Seu d'Urgell, Lleida, Catalonia to Belgian parents from Namur, Dubasin joined Girona FC's youth setup in March 2018, after spells with Club Atlètic Segre and FC Andorra. On 18 July 2019, after finishing his formation, he was loaned to Tercera División side UE Figueres for the season.

On 7 October 2020, Dubasin moved to Segunda División B side UE Llagostera, also on a one-season loan. The following 3 August, he joined UD Logroñés in Primera División RFEF, also on a temporary one season deal.

On 19 July 2022, Dubasin signed a three-year contract with Albacete Balompié, newly promoted to Segunda División. He made his professional debut on 15 August, coming on as a second-half substitute for Rubén Martínez in a 2–1 away win against CD Lugo.

On 3 July 2023, Albacete reached an agreement with Swiss club FC Basel for the transfer of Dubasin. Basel confirmed the transfer on the same day, stating that Dubasin had signed a four-year contract. He joined Basel's first team for their 2023–24 season under head coach Timo Schultz. After playing in two test games, Dubasin played his domestic league debut for the club in the away game in the Kybunpark on 22 July as Basel were defeated 2–1 by St. Gallen. He scored his first goal for his new team in the Swiss Cup second round away game on 16 September. Dubasin was substituted on in the 72nd minute and it was the team's sixth goal, as Basel went on to win 8–0 against amateur club FC Bosporus. He scored his first league goal for the team in the away game in Cornaredo on 6 December. It was the first goal of the match, as Basel went on to win 3–1 against Lugano.

On 23 December, Basel announced that they were loaning Dubasin out to Real Oviedo, in the second highest Spanish league, until the end of the season and the loan-contract had a purchase option. They also said that the loan move was primarily for personal reasons. During his time with FCB early in the season, Dubasin was out for a long time on with a ligament injury in his foot. By the winter break he had made eleven appearances in all competitions (ten league, one cup), in which he scored three goals and made one assist.

On 26 July 2024, Dubasin joined fellow Spanish second division side Sporting de Gijón on loan for the entire 2024–25 season. On 19 June of the following year, he signed a permanent three-year deal with the club.

On 27 July 2026, after scoring a career-best 17 goals during the campaign, Dubasin agreed to a four-year contract with La Liga side CA Osasuna, for a fee of € 4 million plus variables.

== International career ==
On 6 February 2019, Dubasin was called up to the Belgium under-19 team for two friendlies. He made his debut on 1 March, in an unofficial friendly against FCV Dender, however, was subsequently not used in any official international matches.

== Career statistics ==
=== Club ===
As of match played 7 November 2026

Club	Season	League			Cup		Other		Total	
Club	Season	Division	Apps	Goals	Apps	Goals	Apps	Goals	Apps	Goals
Llagostera (loan)	2020–21	Segunda División B	22	3	1	0	5	0	28	3
Logroñés (loan)	2021–22	Primera División RFEF	35	10	1	1	1	1	37	12
Albacete	2022–23	Segunda División	39	10	2	1	2	0	43	11
Basel	2023–24	Swiss Super League	10	2	1	1	0	0	11	3
Real Oviedo (loan)	2023–24	Segunda División	19	0	—		4	0	23	0
Sporting Gijón (loan)	2024–25	Segunda División	37	8	2	0	—		39	8
Sporting Gijón	2025–26	Segunda División	37	16	1	1	—		38	17
Sporting Gijón	Sporting Gijón total		74	24	3	1	—		77	25
Osasuna	2026–27	La Liga	12	0	1	1	—		13	1
Career total			211	49	9	5	12	1	232	55
