= Đorđe Jovanović (footballer) =

Serbian footballer (born 1999)

Đorđe Jovanović Ђорђе Јовановић
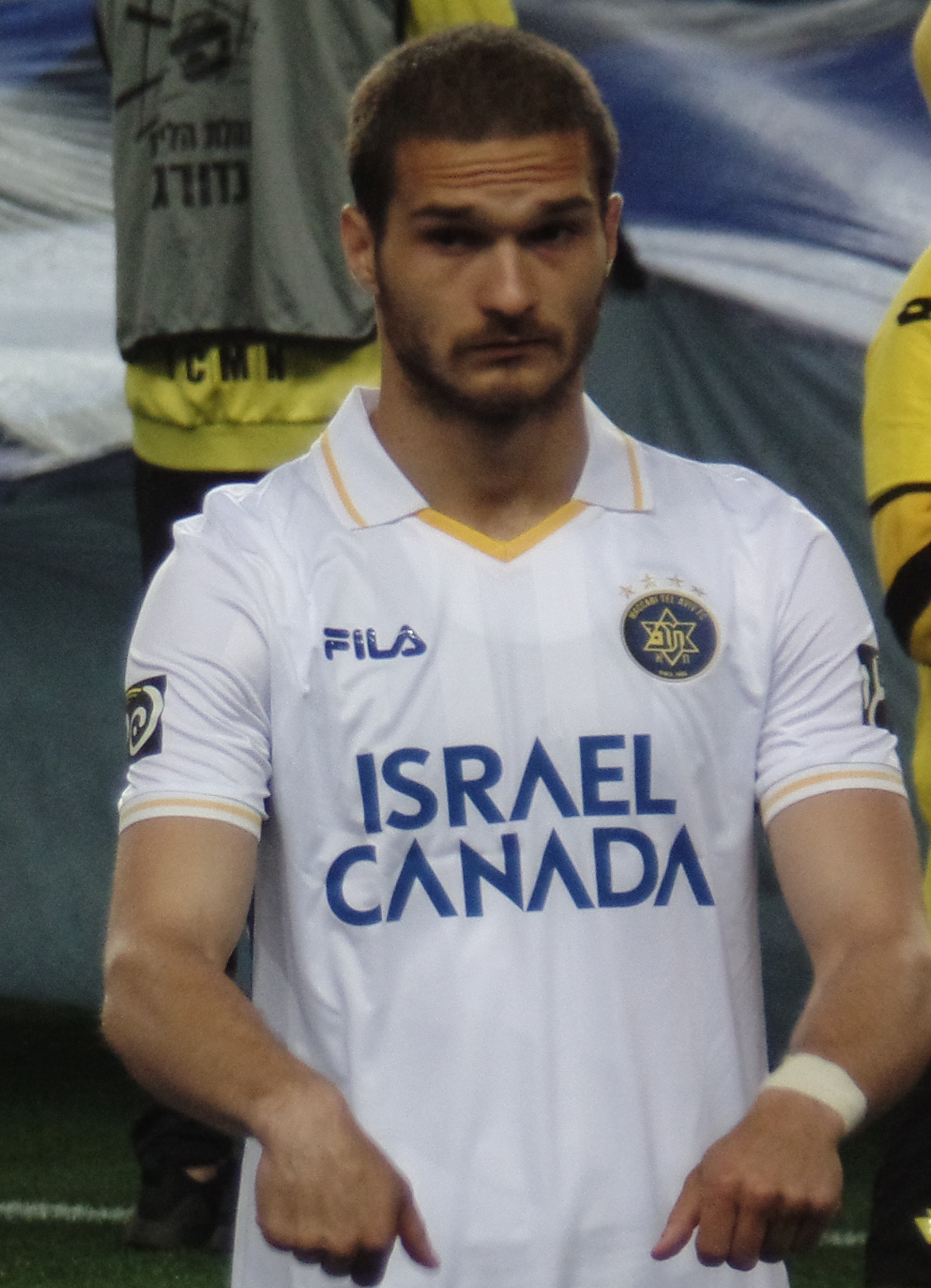
- Jovanović in 2022 with Maccabi Tel Aviv

Personal information
- Date of birth: 15 February 1999 (age 27)
- Place of birth: Leposavić, FR Yugoslavia (now Kosovo)
- Height: 1.87 m (6 ft 1 1/2 in)
- Position: Forward

Team information
- Current team: Čukarički
- Number: 99

Youth career
- Kosmet Leposavić
- 2009–2016: Partizan

Senior career*
Years	Team	Apps	(Gls)
2016–2018	Partizan	21	(4)
2018–2019	Lokeren	10	(1)
2019–2020	Cádiz	6	(0)
2019–2020	→ Cartagena (loan)	16	(3)
2021–2022	Čukarički	32	(20)
2022–2023	Maccabi Tel Aviv	49	(24)
2023–2026	Basel	19	(2)
2024–2025	→ Partizan (loan)	20	(6)
2025–2026	→ Maccabi Haifa (loan)	14	(3)
2026–	Čukarički	3	(0)

International career^{‡}
2015–2016	Serbia U17	8	(1)
2017–2018	Serbia U19	9	(3)
2022–	Serbia	4	(0)
- * Club domestic league appearances and goals as of 20 September 2026 ‡ National team caps and goals as of 8 September 2024

Đorđe Jovanović (Serbian Cyrillic: Ђорђе Јовановић, pronounced [dʑôːrdʑe joʋâːnoʋitɕ]; born 15 February 1999) is a Serbian footballer who plays as a forward for Serbian SuperLiga club Čukarički.

== Club career ==
=== Partizan ===
Born in Leposavić, Jovanović started playing football with local club Kosmet. After one tournament played in Guča, he was invited to Partizan by Dušan Trbojević. He passed youth categories with the club, and signed his first three-year professional contract with Partizan in summer 2015. He has joined the first team at the beginning of 2016 under coach Ivan Tomić. During 2016, Jovanović usually played for youth team, and also played several friendly matches with the first matches, including games against PAOK, and Polimlje, when he was a scorer. Jovanović made his official debut for Partizan in 20 fixture match of the 2016–17 Serbian SuperLiga season against Čukarički, played on 11 December 2016, replacing Uroš Đurđević in 89 minute. In 2017, Jovanović was optionally loaned to satellite club Teleoptik on dual registration until the end of 2016–17 season in the Serbian League Belgrade. Jovanović scored his first goal for Partizan in 4–2 away victory over Rad on 24 September 2017. Likewise, Jovanović also scored in 3–1 away win against Mačva Šabac on 5 November 2017. Finally, Jovanović scored a twice in 2–2 draw to Napredak Kruševac on 5 May 2018, which was the first start on the pitch in his professional career.

=== Lokeren ===
On 2 August 2018, Jovanović signed with Belgium side Lokeren.

=== Cádiz ===
Jovanović switched teams and countries again on 31 January 2019, after agreeing to a four-and-a-half-year contract with Cádiz. On 2 September, after being rarely used, he was loaned to Segunda División B side Cartagena, for one year.

On 5 October 2020, Jovanović terminated his contract with Cádiz.

=== Čukarički ===
In 2021 he returned to Serbia, to FK Čukarički, where he played for one year.

=== Maccabi Tel Aviv ===
In February 2022 Jovanović transferred to Israeli team Maccabi Tel Aviv. In the 2022–23 season, across all competitions, he had 43 appearances during which he scored 22 times and prepared five goals.

=== Basel ===
On 17 August, Swiss Super League team FC Basel announced that they had signed Jovanović on a four-year contract. He chose the shirt number 99. That same day, he joined Basel's first team during their 2023–24 season under the then head coach Timo Schultz. Jovanović played his debut for his new club in the Swiss Cup first round game on 20 August, coming on as a substitute in the 58th minute. He scored his first goal for his new team in the same game, a penalty in the 63rd minute, as Basel went on to win 8–1 against amateur club FC Saint-Blaise.

He played his domestic league debut with the team in the home game in the St. Jakob-Park on 3 September, playing in the starting eleven, as Basel played a 2–2 draw with Zürich. He scored his first league goal with them in the home game on 28 September as Basel played a 1–1 draw with Luzern.

=== Return to Čukarički ===
On 2 September 2026, Jovanović terminated his contract with Basel and returned to Čukarički.

== International career ==
On the national level, Jovanović made his debut for Serbia in a June 2022 Nations League match against Slovenia.

== Career statistics ==
=== Club ===
As of 22 March 2026

Appearances and goals by club, season and competition
Club	Season	League			National cup (Note: Includes Serbian Cup, Belgian Cup, Copa del Rey, Israel State Cup, Swiss Cup)		League cup (Note: Includes Toto Cup)		Europe		Total	
Club	Season	Division	Apps	Goals	Apps	Goals	Apps	Goals	Apps	Goals	Apps	Goals
Partizan	2015–16	Serbian SuperLiga	0	0	0	0	—		0	0	0	0
Partizan	2016–17	Serbian SuperLiga	7	0	0	0	—		0	0	7	0
Partizan	2017–18	Serbian SuperLiga	14	4	2	0	—		3	0	19	4
Partizan	Total		21	4	2	0	—		3	0	26	4
Lokeren	2018–19	Belgian First Division A	10	1	1	0	—		—		11	1
Cádiz	2018–19	Segunda División	6	0	0	0	—		—		6	0
Cartagena (loan)	2019–20	Segunda División B	16	3	2	2	—		—		18	5
Čukarički	2020–21	Serbian SuperLiga	17	9	0	0	—		—		17	9
Čukarički	2021–22	Serbian SuperLiga	15	11	0	0	—		4 (Note: Appearances in UEFA Europa League)	1	19	12
Čukarički	Total		32	20	0	0	—		4	1	36	21
Maccabi Tel Aviv	2021–22	Israeli Premier League	16	9	1	1	—		2 (Note: Appearances in UEFA Europa Conference League)	0	19	10
Maccabi Tel Aviv	2022–23	Israeli Premier League	33	15	4	4	2	1	6	3	45	23
Maccabi Tel Aviv	2023–24	Israeli Premier League	0	0	0	0	1	0	2	0	3	0
Maccabi Tel Aviv	Total		49	24	5	5	3	1	10	3	67	33
FC Basel	2023–24	Swiss Super League	19	2	3	4	—		0	0	22	6
Partizan (loan)	2024–25	Serbian SuperLiga	20	6	1	0	—		3	0	24	6
Maccabi Haifa (loan)	2025–26	Israeli Premier League	12	3	0	0	—		0	0	12	3
Career total			185	63	14	11	1	0	20	4	221	79

=== International ===
As of 8 September 2024

Appearances and goals by national team and year
National team	Year	Apps	Goals
Serbia	2022	1	0
Serbia	2023	2	0
Serbia	2024	1	0
Total		4	0

== Honours ==
Partizan

- Serbian SuperLiga: 2016–17
- Serbian Cup: 2016–17, 2017–18

Individual

- Serbian SuperLiga Player of the Week: 2020–21 (Round 29)
