= Juan Gauto =

Argentine footballer

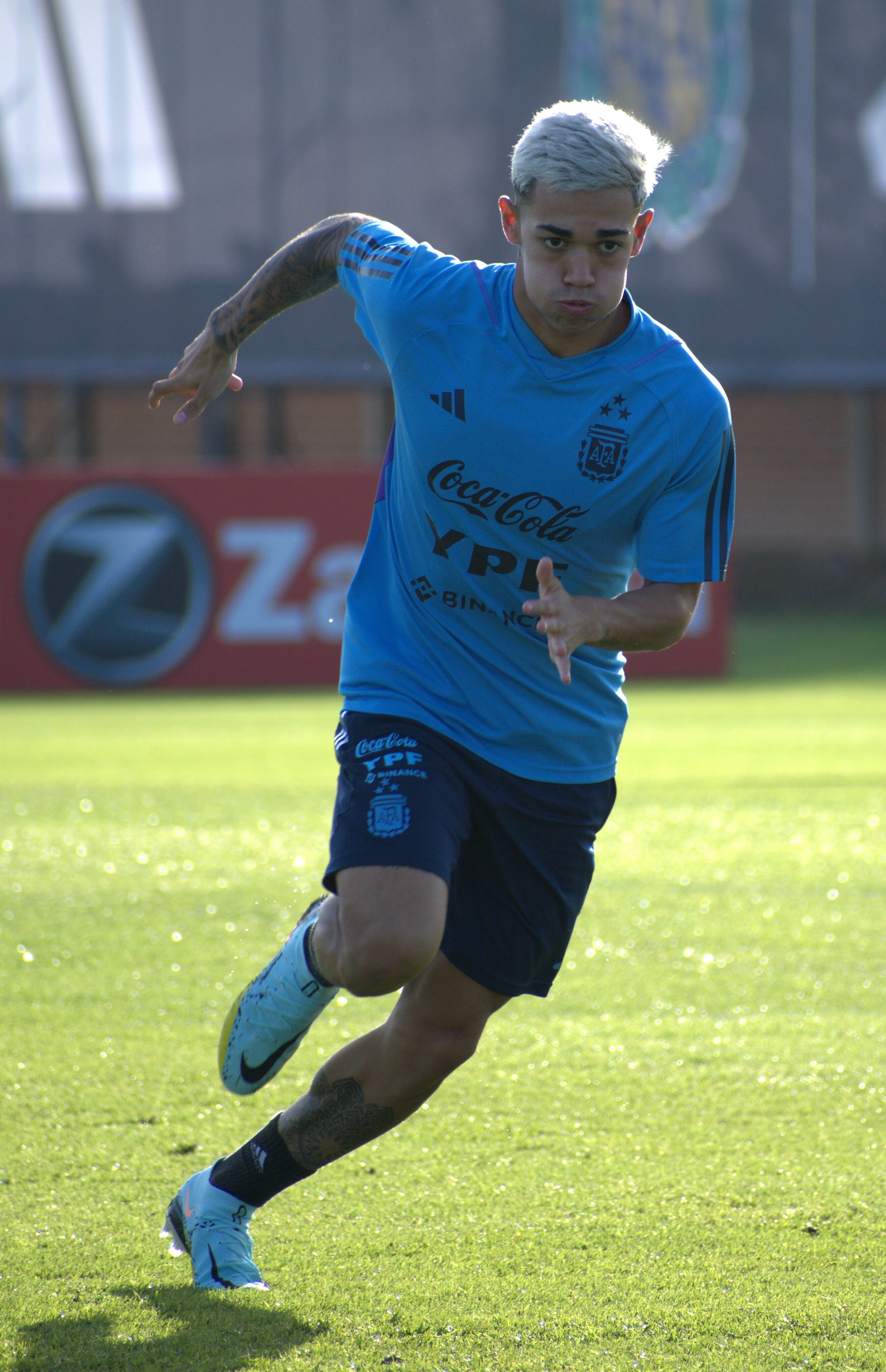
- Gauto in 2023

Personal information
- Full name: Juan Carlos Gauto
- Date of birth: 2 June 2004 (age 22)
- Place of birth: Perito Moreno, Argentina
- Height: 1.72 m (5 ft 8 in)
- Position: Midfielder

Team information
- Current team: Platense (on loan from Basel)
- Number: 33

Youth career
- 2015–2022: Huracán

Senior career*
Years	Team	Apps	(Gls)
2022–2023	Huracán	40	(1)
2023–	Basel	23	(0)
2024–2025	→ Deportivo A Coruña (loan)	15	(0)
2026–	→ Platense (loan)	27	(1)

International career^{‡}
2022–	Argentina U20	8	(2)
- * Club domestic league appearances and goals as of 17:19, 22 November 2026 (UTC) ‡ National team caps and goals as of 31 May 2023

Juan Carlos Gauto (born 2 June 2004) is an Argentine professional footballer who plays as a midfielder for Argentine Primera División club Platense, on loan from Swiss Super League club Basel. He played for the Argentina U-20 in the 2023 FIFA U-20 World Cup.

== Club career ==
=== Huracán ===
Gauto joined Huracán's youth department in 2015. At the traditional Argentine club he played at all youth levels, advancing regularly. Due to his quality and speed, trainer Israel Damonte promoted Gauto from their U-20 to their first team in 2020, giving him his first professional contract. However, the COVID-19 pandemic cut short his visit in the top flight and he was assigned to the reserve team. Gauto advanced to the first team again two years later and he made his professional debut for them in the match against Tigre on 15 April 2022. Gauto scored his first professional goal on 18 February 2023, during a championship match against Barracas Central. He scored after coming into play as substitute and thus contributed to his team's victory (2–0 final score).

=== Basel ===
On 28 August 2023, Swiss Super League side Basel announced that they had signed Gauto on a five-year deal. He joined Basel's first team for their 2023–24 season under head coach Timo Schultz. Gauto made his Swiss Super League debut for the club in the home game in the St. Jakob-Park on 3 September, coming on as a substitute in the 59th minute, as Basel played a 2–2 draw with Zürich. He scored his first goal for his new club in the Swiss Cup away game two weeks later on 16 September. In fact he scored a brace, the team's fourth and fifth goals as Basel went on to win 8–0 against amateur club FC Bosporus.

==== Loan to Deportivo A Coruña ====
On 30 August 2024, Gauto was loaned to Spanish Segunda División side Deportivo A Coruña, for one year.

== International career ==
Gauto was selected to the Argentina U-20 team by coach Javier Mascherano as they participated in the Under-20 World Cup in 2023. During the competition held in Argentina he played three matches, two of which as a starter. The team was eliminated in the round of 16 by Nigeria following the 2–0 defeat.

== Personal life ==
Gauto was born in Perito Moreno, a small town in the province of Santa Cruz, in southern Argentina. During 2015 his mother moved to Buenos Aires together with him and his three brothers.

== Career statistics ==
=== Club ===
As of match played 14 March 2026

Appearances and goals by club, season and competition
Club	Season	League			National cup (Note: Includes Copa Argentina, Swiss Cup and Copa del Rey)		Continental		Other		Total	
Club	Season	Division	Apps	Goals	Apps	Goals	Apps	Goals	Apps	Goals	Apps	Goals
Huracán	2022	Argentine Primera División	11	0	0	0	—		5 (Note: Appearance(s) in Copa de la Liga Profesional)	0	16	0
Huracán	2023	Argentine Primera División	23	1	1	0	9 (Note: Four appearances in Copa Libertadores; Five appearances in Copa Sudamericana)	0	1	0	34	1
Huracán	Total		34	1	1	0	9	0	6	0	50	1
FC Basel	2023–24	Swiss Super League	22	0	1	2	0	0	—		23	2
FC Basel	2024–25	Swiss Super League	1	0	0	0	—		—		1	0
FC Basel	2025–26	Swiss Super League	0	0	0	0	0	0	—		0	0
FC Basel	Total		23	0	1	2	0	0	—		24	2
FC Basel II	2023–24	Swiss Promotion League	1	0	—		—		—		1	0
FC Basel II	2025–26	Swiss Promotion League	1	1	—		—		—		1	1
FC Basel II	Total		2	1	—		—		—		2	1
Deportivo de La Coruña (loan)	2024–25	Segunda División	15	0	1	0	—		—		16	0
Platense (loan)	2026	Argentine Primera División	10	0	1	0	0	0	0	0	11	0
Career total			84	2	4	2	9	0	6	0	103	4
