= Andrin Hunziker =

Swiss footballer (born 2003)

Personal information
- Date of birth: 21 February 2003 (age 23)
- Place of birth: Basel, Switzerland
- Height: 1.92 m (6 ft 4 in)
- Position: Forward

Team information
- Current team: St. Gallen
- Number: 9

Youth career
- 2012–2013: FC Therwil
- 2013–2021: Basel

Senior career*
Years	Team	Apps	(Gls)
2021–2024	Basel U21	23	(7)
2021–2026	Basel	8	(1)
2022–2023	→ Aarau (loan)	28	(8)
2024–2025	→ Karlsruher SC (loan)	16	(2)
2025–2026	→ Winterthur (loan)	36	(11)
2026–	St. Gallen	6	(2)

International career
2019	Switzerland U16	2	(1)
2019–2021	Switzerland U17	7	(1)
2022–2023	Switzerland U20	4	(1)
- * Club domestic league appearances and goals as of 28 September 2026

Andrin Hunziker (born 21 February 2003) is a Swiss professional footballer who plays as a forward for Swiss Super League club St. Gallen.

== Club career ==
Hunziker started his youth football by local amateur club FC Therwil, but soon moved to the Basel youth academy and advanced through this regularly. He graduated to Basel's first team during the winter break of their 2020–21 season under head coach Ciriaco Sforza. Hunziker played his domestic league debut on 27 February 2021 in a 3–1 league defeat against St. Gallen as he was substituted on in the 70th minute. On 10 June 2021 Basel announced that Hunziker had signed his first professional contract with them and that this was over four years, until summer 2025.

On 26 July 2022, Basel announced that they would loan Hunziker out to Aarau for the 2022–23 season, stating that a purchase option was not agreed. Aarau confirmed the deal on the same day, stating, that Hunziker would gain on playing experience. The season was successful, not necessarily for the club who ended the season in fourth position in the table, thus missing their declared aim of promotion, but for the striker, who had scored eight goals in 28 appearances.

Following his loan Hunziker returned to his club of origin for their 2023–24 season and in his first league game scored his first league goal for them. However, it could not help the team because they were defeated 2–1 by newly promoted Lausanne-Sport. In the Swiss Cup first round match one week later he scored his next, it was the team's sixth, as Basel went on to win 8–1 against amateur club FC Saint-Blaise.

Then on 24 August, the club announced that Hunziker had seriously injured himself during training. The diagnosis has now been made that he had suffered a torn cruciate ligament and a partial tear of the inner ligament. He had to undergo surgery would not be available to the team for several months.

On 28 June 2024, Hunziker joined Karlsruher SC in German 2. Bundesliga on loan.

On 17 July 2026, Hunziker signed a four-year contract with St. Gallen.

== International career ==
Hunziker is a current Swiss youth international. He scored his first goal for the U-17 team in the game on 27 October 2019 as they won 7–0 against San Marino U-17. He also played four times for the Swiss U-20 team

== Career statistics ==
=== Club ===
As of match played 15 March 2026

Appearances and goals by club, season and competition
Club	Season	League			National cup (Note: Includes Swiss Cup and DFB Pokal)		Continental		Other		Total	
Club	Season	Division	Apps	Goals	Apps	Goals	Apps	Goals	Apps	Goals	Apps	Goals
FC Basel	2020–21	Swiss Super League	4	0	0	0	0	0	—		4	0
FC Basel	2021–22	Swiss Super League	1	0	0	0	0	0	—		1	0
FC Basel	2022–23	Swiss Super League	0	0	0	0	0	0	—		0	0
FC Basel	2023–24	Swiss Super League	3	1	1	1	1 (Note: Appearance(s) in UEFA Europa Conference League)	0	—		5	2
FC Basel	2024–25	Swiss Super League	0	0	0	0	—		—		0	0
FC Basel	2025–26	Swiss Super League	0	0	0	0	0	0	—		0	0
FC Basel	Total		8	1	1	1	1	0	—		10	2
FC Basel II	2021–22	Swiss Promotion League	5	6	—		—		—		5	6
FC Basel II	2023–24	Swiss Promotion League	1	0	—		—		—		1	0
FC Basel II	Total		6	6	—		—		—		6	6
Aarau (loan)	2022–23	Swiss Challenge League	28	8	1	0	—		—		29	8
Karlsruher SC (loan)	2024–25	2. Bundesliga	16	2	3	0	—		—		19	2
Winterthur (loan)	2025–26	Swiss Super League	28	9	3	1	—		—		31	10
Career total			86	26	8	2	1	0	0	0	95	28
