= Arlet Junior Zé =

Swiss footballer (born 2006)

Personal information
- Date of birth: 22 March 2006 (age 20)
- Place of birth: Zürich, Switzerland
- Height: 1.78 m (5 ft 10 in)
- Positions: Left winger; midfielder

Team information
- Current team: Eintracht Braunschweig
- Number: 19

Youth career
- –2020: Grasshoppers
- 2021–2023: Basel

Senior career*
Years	Team	Apps	(Gls)
2022–2025	Basel II	40	(9)
2023–2026	Basel	16	(1)
2026	→ Midtjylland (loan)	1	(0)
2026–	Eintracht Braunschweig	0	(0)

International career^{‡}
2021–2022	Switzerland U16	3	(1)
2022–2023	Switzerland U17	15	(6)
2023–2024	Switzerland U19	11	(2)
2025–	Switzerland U19	9	(0)
- * Club domestic league appearances and goals as of 17 May 2026 ‡ National team caps and goals as of 27 March 2026

Arlet Junior Zé (born 22 March 2006) is a Swiss professional footballer who plays for German 2. Bundesliga club Eintracht Braunschweig. He plays mainly in the position as left winger, but also as midfielder. He has been Swiss youth international at various levels.

== Career ==
=== FC Basel ===
Junior Zé played his youth football with Grasshoppers and during the winter break of 2020–21 season he moved to youth department of FC Basel. He was a member of the FCB U-18 team that celebrated winning the Swiss championship at the end of June 2023. On 21 July the club announced that he would join Basel's first team for their 2023–24 FC Basel season under head coach Timo Schultz.

After appearing in three test games Junior Zé played his Swiss Super League debut for the club in the home game in the St. Jakob-Park on 30 July, as he was substituted in during the match that Basel won 5–2 against Winterthur. He scored his first goal for his new team in the Swiss Cup away game on 20 August. It was the last goal of the game as Basel won 8–1 against amateur club FC Saint-Blaise.

At the same time Junior Zé remained part of the U-19 team that was playing in the UEFA Youth League. On 25 October during the first round match between Basel and Gent he scored the goal to the final score in the 2–0 win.

In the Swiss Super League match against St. Gallen on 26 November Junior Zé suffered a broken toe and had to undergo an operation. He was not able to play football again until the New Year.

=== FC Midtjylland ===
On 26 January 2026, 19-year-old Junior Zé joined Danish Superliga club FC Midtjylland on a loan deal from Swiss club FC Basel for the remainder of the 2025–26 season. The agreement included an option for Midtjylland to make the transfer permanent. He was assigned the number 39 shirt.

=== Eintracht Braunschweig ===
On 3 July 2026, Junior Zé signed a three-season contract with Eintracht Braunschweig in German 2. Bundesliga.

== Personal life ==
Born in Switzerland, Junior Zé is of Cameroonian descent.

== Career statistics ==
=== Club ===
As of match played 15 February 2026

Appearances and goals by club, season and competition
Club	Season	League			National cup		Europe		Total	
Club	Season	Division	Apps	Goals	Apps	Goals	Apps	Goals	Apps	Goals
Basel II	2022–23	Swiss Promotion League	10	0	—		—		10	0
Basel II	2023–24	Swiss Promotion League	14	1	—		—		14	1
Basel II	2024–25	Swiss Promotion League	16	8	—		—		16	8
Basel II	Total		40	9	—		—		40	9
Basel	2023–24	Swiss Super League	9	0	1	1	1 (Note: Appearance in UEFA Conference League)	0	11	0
Basel	2025–26	Swiss Super League	7	1	3	1	2 (Note: One appearance in UEFA Champions League, one appearance in UEFA Europa League)	0	12	2
Basel	Total		16	1	4	2	3	0	23	3
Midtjylland (loan)	2025–26	Danish Superliga	1	0	0	0	0	0	1	0
Career total			57	10	4	2	3	0	64	11

== Honours ==
Basel

- Swiss Super League: 2024–25

Midtjylland

- Danish Cup: 2025–26
