= Vouilloz (surname) =

Vouilloz is a surname of Arpitan origin. Like many Arpitan anthroponyms, the final -z only marks paroxytonic stress and should not be pronounced. Nevertheless, it is often pronounced in French through hypercorrection. Notable people with the surname include:

- Nicolas Vouilloz (born 1976), French professional mountain biker and former professional rally driver
- Nicolas Vouilloz (footballer) (born 2001), a Swiss professional footballer
