= Thierno Barry (footballer, born 2002) =

French footballer (born 2002)

Personal information
- Full name: Thierno Mamadou Barry
- Date of birth: 21 October 2002 (age 24)
- Place of birth: Lyon, France
- Height: 1.95 m (6 ft 5 in)
- Position: Striker

Team information
- Current team: Everton
- Number: 11

Youth career
- 2012–2016: Montchat Lyon
- 2016–2019: Saint-Priest
- 2019–2021: Toulon

Senior career*
| Years | Team | Apps | (Gls) |
| 2021–2022 | Sochaux B | 22 | (10) |
| 2022–2023 | Beveren | 31 | (20) |
| 2023–2024 | Basel | 38 | (14) |
| 2024–2025 | Villarreal | 35 | (11) |
| 2025– | Everton | 48 | (14) |

International career
| 2025 | France U21 | 8 | (1) |
- * Club domestic league appearances and goals as of 18:33, 6 November 2026 (UTC)

Thierno Mamadou Barry (born 21 October 2002) is a French professional footballer who plays as a striker for Premier League club Everton.

== Club career ==
=== Early career ===
Born in Lyon, Barry played for Toulon before moving to Sochaux in 2021; he was initially assigned to the reserve team in the Championnat National 3. Despite scoring on a regular basis, he never played for the first team.

On 6 July 2022, after a successful test period, Barry was awarded a contract for two seasons in Belgium with Beveren. He finished the season with 20 goals overall, as they narrowly missed out on promotion.

=== Basel ===
On 3 July 2023, Swiss Super League club Basel announced that Barry had signed on a four-year contract. He joined Basel's first team for the 2023–24 season under head coach Timo Schultz. After playing in two test games, Barry made his league debut for the club in an away match at the Kybunpark on 22 July against St. Gallen. Barry would be shown a second yellow card and dismissed in the 69th minute, as Basel were defeated 2–1.

Barry scored his first goal for his new club in his next match five days later, coming on in the first leg of the UEFA Europa Conference League second qualifying round on 27 July against Tobol from Kazakhstan. However, Barry would be shown a straight red card later in the match, and was dismissed for the second time in his first two competitive appearances with the club as Basel suffered a 3–1 defeat.

=== Villarreal ===
On 21 August 2024, Barry signed for La Liga club Villarreal on a five-year deal. In his debut season in La Liga, Barry scored 11 goals in 35 appearances.

=== Everton ===
On 9 July 2025, Barry signed for Premier League side Everton on a four-year deal. On 6 December, Barry scored his first career Premier League goal with the club in a 3–0 home victory against Nottingham Forest, assisted by Iliman Ndiaye.

In Everton's opening Premier League match of the 2026–27 season, Barry scored in a 2–0 win over Crystal Palace. On 26 August 2026, Barry scored his first hat-trick, against Preston in the second round of the EFL Cup, for which he won Player of the Round.

== International career ==
Barry was called up to the France U21s for the 2025 UEFA European Under-21 Championship.

== Personal life ==
Born in France, Barry is of Guinean descent.

== Career statistics ==
As of match played 6 November 2026

Appearances and goals by club, season and competition
| Club | Season | League | | | National cup (Note: Includes Belgian Cup, Swiss Cup, Copa del Rey, FA Cup) | | League cup (Note: Includes EFL Cup) | | Europe | | Total | |
| Club | Season | Division | Apps | Goals | Apps | Goals | Apps | Goals | Apps | Goals | Apps | Goals |
|---|---|---|---|---|---|---|---|---|---|---|---|---|
| Sochaux B | 2021–22 | Championnat National 3 | 22 | 10 | — | | — | | — | | 22 | 10 |
| Beveren | 2022–23 | Challenger Pro League | 31 | 20 | 2 | 0 | — | | — | | 33 | 20 |
| Basel | 2023–24 | Swiss Super League | 35 | 9 | 1 | 2 | — | | 1 (Note: Appearance in UEFA Europa Conference League) | 1 | 37 | 12 |
| Basel | 2024–25 | Swiss Super League | 3 | 5 | 1 | 3 | — | | — | | 4 | 8 |
| Basel | Total | | 38 | 14 | 2 | 5 | — | | 1 | 1 | 41 | 20 |
| Villarreal | 2024–25 | La Liga | 35 | 11 | 2 | 0 | — | | — | | 37 | 11 |
| Everton | 2025–26 | Premier League | 38 | 8 | 1 | 0 | 2 | 0 | — | | 41 | 8 |
| Everton | 2026–27 | Premier League | 10 | 6 | 0 | 0 | 3 | 4 | — | | 13 | 10 |
| Everton | Total | | 48 | 14 | 1 | 0 | 5 | 4 | — | | 54 | 18 |
| Career total | | | 174 | 69 | 7 | 5 | 5 | 4 | 1 | 1 | 187 | 79 |
