= Renato Veiga =

Portuguese footballer (born 2003)

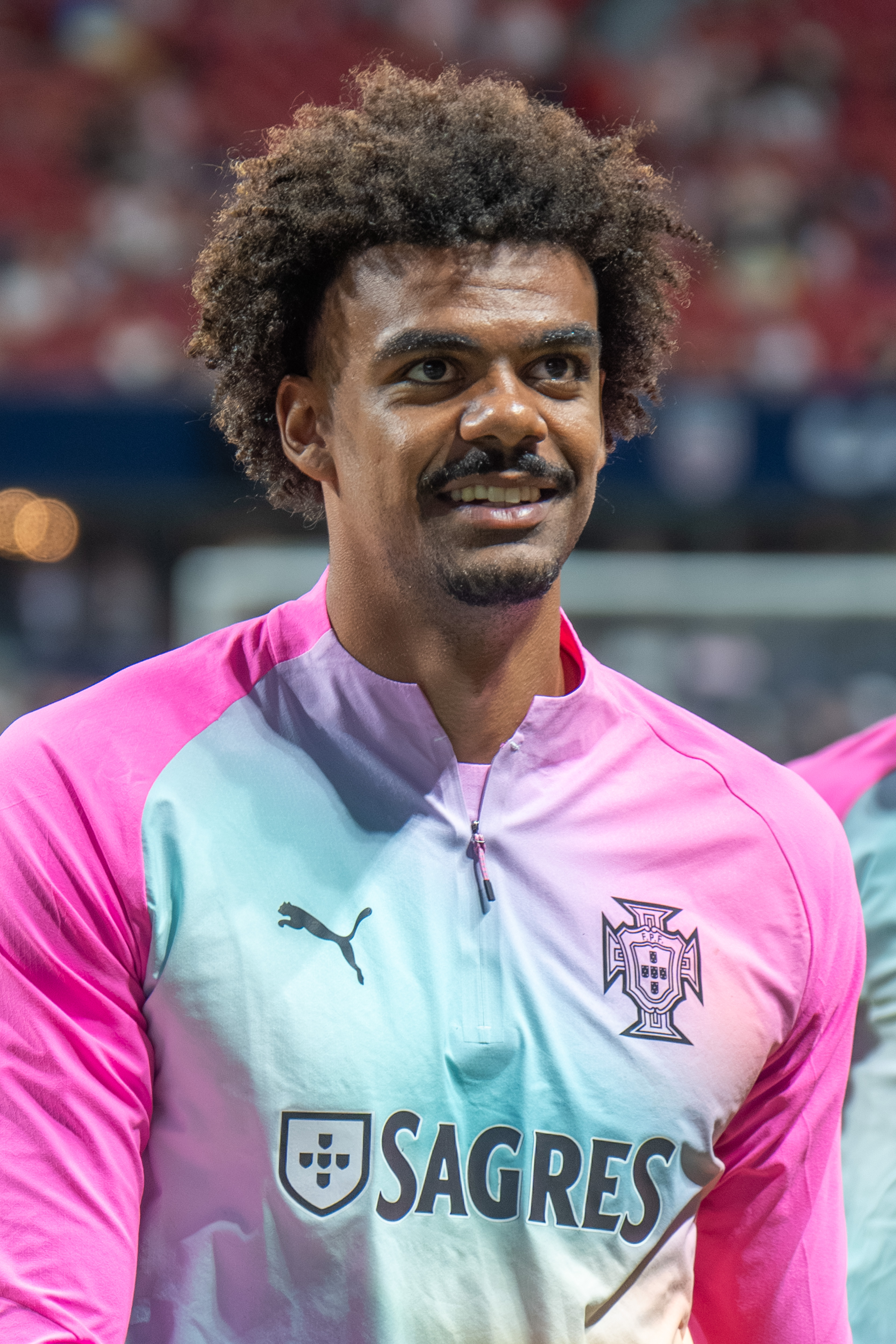
- Veiga with Portugal in 2026

Personal information
- Full name: Renato da Palma Veiga
- Date of birth: 29 July 2003 (age 23)
- Place of birth: Lisbon, Portugal
- Height: 1.90 m (6 ft 3 in)
- Positions: Defender; defensive midfielder

Team information
- Current team: Villarreal
- Number: 12

Youth career
- –2010: KACM
- 2010–2013: Sporting CP
- 2013–2016: Académie Lakhlej Foot
- 2016–2018: Real Massamá
- 2018–2023: Sporting CP

Senior career*
Years	Team	Apps	(Gls)
2021–2023	Sporting CP B	31	(4)
2023	→ FC Augsburg (loan)	13	(0)
2023–2024	Basel	23	(2)
2024–2025	Chelsea	7	(0)
2025	→ Juventus (loan)	13	(0)
2025–	Villarreal	44	(0)

International career^{‡}
2021	Portugal U19	6	(0)
2022–2023	Portugal U20	5	(1)
2023–2024	Portugal U21	7	(1)
2024–	Portugal	24	(1)
Medal record
Men's football
Representing Portugal
UEFA Nations League
Winner	2025 Germany
- * Club domestic league appearances and goals as of 20:27, 22 November 2026 (UTC) ‡ National team caps and goals as of 22:55, 17 November 2026 (UTC)

Renato da Palma Veiga (Portuguese pronunciation: [ʁɨˈnatuˈvɐjɡɐ]; born 29 July 2003) is a Portuguese professional footballer who plays for La Liga club Villarreal and the Portugal national team. Mainly a centre-back, he can also play as a left-back or defensive midfielder.

He came through Sporting CP's youth academy, and was loaned to Bundesliga side Augsburg in January 2023, before joining Swiss Super League side Basel in August. After a season in Switzerland, he moved to Premier League side Chelsea in July 2024.

Veiga is a former Portugal youth international, representing his country at various levels. He made his full debut in 2024 and won the UEFA Nations League in 2025.

== Club career ==
=== Early career ===
Veiga was born in Lisbon, Portugal. He joined Sporting CP's academy in 2010. Due to his father's football career, Veiga lived and played in different countries during his childhood, including Morocco, before returning to Portugal, when he rejoined Sporting CP in 2018, swiftly progressing from the under-17 team to the reserves as he was thrown in alongside players well above his age group.

Veiga made his debut for Sporting CP B against Cova Piedade U23 on 12 September 2020. On 31 October 2020, he scored his first goal against Marítimo's U23. However, despite his swift progress, first-team opportunities would be hard to come by under head coach Ruben Amorim, although he was included in Sporting's UEFA Champions League squad to face Manchester City on 9 March 2022, with his manager revealing that Veiga was included "because [Sporting] had a few midfielders [out] at the moment, being with the first team help the young players grow."

=== Loan to Augsburg ===
Having failed to make a first-team breakthrough by the time he turned 19, Veiga was loaned to Bundesliga side Augsburg in January 2023, on what was intended to be a one year loan up until 31 December 2023. He made his league debut on 11 February in a 3–1 defeat against Mainz 05. However, despite being afforded plenty of minutes across 13 appearances, he failed to impress and on 15 August, the club announced that after analyzing the first six months together with the player, they ultimately came to the decision to end the loan early.

=== Basel ===
On 28 August 2023, Swiss Super League side Basel announced that they had signed Veiga on a four-year contract. This was reported to have had a fee of €4.6 million, with Sporting keeping a 10% sell-on clause. On the next day, Veiga joined Basel's first team during their 2023–24 season under head coach Timo Schultz.

Veiga played his domestic league debut for his new club in the home game in the St. Jakob-Park on 3 September, playing in the starting eleven. He scored his first goal for the team in the same game, a free kick, as Basel played a 2–2 draw with Zürich. He was named player of the week by the Swiss Super League and the strike ultimately earned Basel's Goal of the Season award.

Under Schultz, he played a variety of roles, mainly playing as a defensive midfielder, whilst also filling in at centre-back and left-back, where he emerged as one of the best players in the league. However, the second half of his season was hampered by an ankle sprain, which saw him missing the relegation play-offs as Basel secured survival.

=== Chelsea ===
On 12 July 2024, Veiga signed a seven-year contract with Premier League club Chelsea with a further one-year option. The fee was reported to be €14 million. On 18 August, he made his debut for the club, as a substitute, in a 2–0 loss against Manchester City in the league. He scored his first goal on 3 October, in the 4–2 victory over Gent, during the inaugural matchday of the newly formatted UEFA Conference League league stage.

==== Loan to Juventus ====
On 27 January 2025, Veiga joined Serie A club Juventus on loan until the end of the 2024–25 season.

=== Villarreal ===
On 22 August 2025, Veiga officially joined La Liga club Villarreal signing a seven-year contract in a club record deal reported to be £26 million.

== International career ==
Veiga represented Portugal at under-19, under-20 and under-21 levels, for a total of 17 caps. On 8 September 2023 he earned his first appearance for Portugal at under-21 level, playing the 3–0 victory against Andorra in the 2023 UEFA European Championship qualification, and scored his first goal against Belarus, in a 6–1 victory at the same phase.

Veiga was called up to the senior Portugal national team for the first time for the UEFA Nations League matches against Croatia and Scotland in September 2024. He made his debut on 13 October, starting in a 3–1 away victory against Poland in the UEFA Nations League.

In May 2025, Veiga was selected for Portugal's 2025 UEFA Nations League Finals squad. He and his team would go on to win the tournament 5–3 in a penalty shootout over rivals Spain.

On 16 November 2025, Veiga scored his first senior international goal, the opener in a 9–1 victory over Armenia at the Estádio do Dragão, as Portugal sealed qualification for the 2026 FIFA World Cup.

On 19 May 2026, Veiga was selected in the 26-man squad for the 2026 FIFA World Cup.

== Personal life ==
Veiga is the son of the Cape Verde former international footballer Nélson Veiga.

== Style of play ==
A left-footed versatile defender, Veiga started out playing as a defensive midfielder, while also filling in at center back or left-back during his spell at Basel, under manager Timo Schultz. His style combines physicality, athleticism, and technical skill, making him effective in breaking up play, tackling, and distributing the ball from deep areas. At Basel, he was trusted to initiate attacks with his vision and passing range, ranking highly in progressive and long passes within the Swiss Super League.

Defensively, Veiga is assertive, quick for his size, and excels in pressing opponents to force turnovers. His physical attributes and aggressive nature make him effective in duels, while his athleticism and long strides provide speed and coverage, allowing him to recover and press opponents quickly. In possession, his passing ability stands out, as he can switch play effortlessly and deliver precise long balls, often breaking the lines and initiating attacks.

== Career statistics ==
=== Club ===
As of match played 22 November 2026

Appearances and goals by club, season and competition
Club	Season	League			National cup (Note: Includes Swiss Cup, FA Cup, Copa del Rey)		League cup (Note: Includes EFL Cup)		Europe		Other		Total	
Club	Season	Division	Apps	Goals	Apps	Goals	Apps	Goals	Apps	Goals	Apps	Goals	Apps	Goals
Sporting CP B	2021–22	Liga 3	16	1	—		—		—		—		16	1
Sporting CP B	2022–23	Liga 3	15	3	—		—		—		—		15	3
Sporting CP B	Total		31	4	—		—		—		—		31	4
FC Augsburg (loan)	2022–23	Bundesliga	13	0	—		—		—		—		13	0
Basel	2023–24	Swiss Super League	23	2	3	0	—		—		—		26	2
Chelsea	2024–25	Premier League	7	0	1	0	2	0	8 (Note: Appearances in UEFA Conference League)	2	0	0	18	2
Juventus (loan)	2024–25	Serie A	13	0	0	0	—		2 (Note: Appearances in UEFA Champions League)	0	0	0	15	0
Villarreal	2025–26	La Liga	32	0	2	0	—		8	1	—		42	1
Villarreal	2026–27	La Liga	12	0	0	0	—		4	0	—		16	0
Villarreal	Total		44	0	2	0	—		12	1	—		58	1
Career total			131	6	6	0	2	0	22	1	0	0	161	9

=== International ===
As of match played 17 November 2026

Appearances and goals by national team and year
National team	Year	Apps	Goals
Portugal	2024	3	0
Portugal	2025	6	1
Portugal	2026	15	0
Total		24	1

As of match played 16 November 2025.
Portugal score listed first, score column indicates score after each Veiga goal.

List of international goals scored by Renato Veiga
No.	Date	Venue	Cap	Opponent	Score	Result	Competition
1	16 November 2025	Estádio do Dragão, Porto, Portugal	9	Armenia	1–0	9–1	2026 FIFA World Cup qualification

== Honours ==
Chelsea

- UEFA Conference League: 2024–25

Portugal

- UEFA Nations League: 2024–25
