= Roméo Beney =

Swiss footballer (born 2005)

Personal information
- Date of birth: 19 January 2005 (age 21)
- Place of birth: Yverdon-les-Bains, Switzerland
- Height: 1.87 m (6 ft 2 in)
- Position: Winger

Team information
- Current team: Famalicão
- Number: 18

Youth career
- Yverdon-Sport
- –2021: Sion
- 2021–2022: Basel

Senior career*
Years	Team	Apps	(Gls)
2022–2025	Basel II	48	(17)
2023–2025	Basel	16	(1)
2025	→ Lausanne Ouchy (loan)	17	(5)
2025–	Famalicão	14	(0)

International career^{‡}
2021–2022	Switzerland U17	3	(0)
2022–2023	Switzerland U18	9	(1)
2023–2024	Switzerland U19	8	(4)
2024–	Switzerland U20	5	(1)
- * Club domestic league appearances and goals as of 25 May 2026 ‡ National team caps and goals as of 15 November 2024

Roméo Beney (born 19 January 2005) is a Swiss professional footballer who plays as a winger for Primeira Liga club Famalicão. He has been Swiss youth international at various levels.

== Club career ==
Born in Yverdon-les-Bains, Beney started his youth football with local club Yverdon-Sport, but soon moved to the youth department of Sion. In September 2021 he moved to Basel, played first in their U-18 team and a year later advanced to their U-21 team, who play in the Promotion League, the third highest tier of the Swiss football league system.

At the beginning of November, newly installed Basel head-coach Fabio Celestini visited the UEFA Youth League match between Basel and Dinamo Zagreb. Because Beney played well and netted the winning goal, Celestini invited him to train with the first team. Then due to the long injury list, Beney was named as substitute for the away match in the Cornaredo against Lugano and in the 57th minute he was substituted on. Beney's first attempt at goal landed on the underside of the crossbar, but his second attempt landed in the net and Basel won the away game.

On 9 January 2024, FCB announced that Beney had signed a professional contract with them and would be member of the first team squad with immediate effect.

On 4 January 2025, Beney moved on loan to Lausanne Ouchy.

== International career ==
Beney has been Swiss youth international at various levels, since 2021. His first game for the Swiss U-17 team was on 11 August, as the team played against Italy U-17. In March 2022 he had two further appearances as substitute. In November 2022 Beney advanced to the Swiss U-18 team, having nine appearances for them, scoring one goal. The first on 8 November against Spain U-18. He scored his goal the team played a 2–2 draw against Belgium U-18 on 22 March 2023.

Beney advanced to the Swiss U-19 team in the summer of 2023 and had an appearance in each of the five friendly matches during that Autumn. His first appearance was on 9 September as the team played England U-19. The English team took the lead twice and Beney scored the equaliser each time. The English team won 4–2, Beney was substituted out after 65 minutes. Beney also scored a goal in the 3–3 draw played against France U-19 on 17 October 2023.

== Personal life ==
Beney is of Brazilian descent via his mother. Beney's father Nicolas Beney was also a professional footballer, who played as goalkeeper between 1997 and 2010. His younger sister Iman plays for Manchester City W.F.C and the Swiss women's team. His aunt Noémie Beney was also a footballer.

== Sources ==
- Romeo Beney at Verein "Basler Fussballarchiv"
- Romeo Beney at UEFA.com
