= Kevin Rüegg =

Swiss footballer (born 1998)

Personal information
- Date of birth: 5 August 1998 (age 28)
- Place of birth: Uster, Switzerland
- Height: 1.73 m (5 ft 8 in)
- Positions: Right-back; midfielder

Team information
- Current team: Basel
- Number: 27

Senior career*
Years	Team	Apps	(Gls)
2016–2020	FC Zürich II		
2017–2020	FC Zürich	94	(3)
2020–2024	Hellas Verona	7	(0)
2022	→ Lugano (loan)	16	(0)
2022–2023	→ Young Boys (loan)	10	(0)
2023–2024	→ FC Basel (loan)	20	(0)
2024–	FC Basel	28	(0)

International career^{‡}
2013	Switzerland U15	2	(0)
2013	Switzerland U16	2	(0)
2014	Switzerland U17	6	(0)
2016–2017	Switzerland U19	4	(0)
2017–2021	Switzerland U21	17	(0)
- * Club domestic league appearances and goals as of 28 September 2026 ‡ National team caps and goals as of 19:33, 4 June 2023 (UTC)

Kevin Rüegg (born 5 August 1998) is a Swiss professional footballer who plays as a right-back for Swiss Super League club Basel. He can also play in midfield. He has represented Switzerland at various youth levels.

== Career ==
In August 2020, Rüegg moved to Serie A side Hellas Verona on a five-year contract.

In February 2022, Rüegg was loaned to Lugano until the end of the season.

On 16 July 2022, Rüegg joined Young Boys on loan with an option to buy.

On 6 September 2023, he joined Basel on loan with an option to buy.

== Personal life ==
Born in Switzerland, Rüegg's mother is Cameroonian and his father is Swiss.

== Honours ==
FC Zürich

- Swiss Challenge League: 2016–17

Lugano

- Swiss Cup: 2021–22

Young Boys

- Swiss Super League: 2022–23
- Swiss Cup: 2022–23

Basel

- Swiss Super League: 2024–25

=== Individual ===
- Swiss Super League Team of the Year: 2018–19

== Career statistics ==
=== Club ===
As of 22:03, 23 May 2024 (UTC).

Appearances and goals by club, season and competition
Club	Season	League			National Cup		Continental		Other		Total	
Club	Season	Division	Apps	Goals	Apps	Goals	Apps	Goals	Apps	Goals	Apps	Goals
FC Zürich	2016–17	Challenge League	9	0	0	0	—		—		9	0
FC Zürich	2017–18	Super League	31	0	4	1	—		—		35	1
FC Zürich	2018–19	Super League	26	2	4	0	4 (Note: Appearances in UEFA Europa League)	0	—		34	2
FC Zürich	2019–20	Super League	28	1	1	0	—		—		29	1
FC Zürich	Total		94	3	9	1	4	0	0	0	107	4
Hellas Verona	2020–21	Serie A	7	0	1	0	—		—		8	0
Hellas Verona	2021–22	Serie A	0	0	1	0	—		—		1	0
Hellas Verona	Total		7	0	2	0	—		—		9	0
Lugano (loan)	2021–22	Super League	16	0	3	0	—		—		19	0
Young Boys (loan)	2022–23	Super League	10	0	2	0	3 (Note: Appearances in UEFA Conference League)	0	—		15	0
Basel (loan)	2023–24	Super League	20	0	1	0	—		—		21	0
Career total			147	3	17	1	7	0	0	0	171	4
