= Martin Rueda =

Swiss footballer (born 1963)

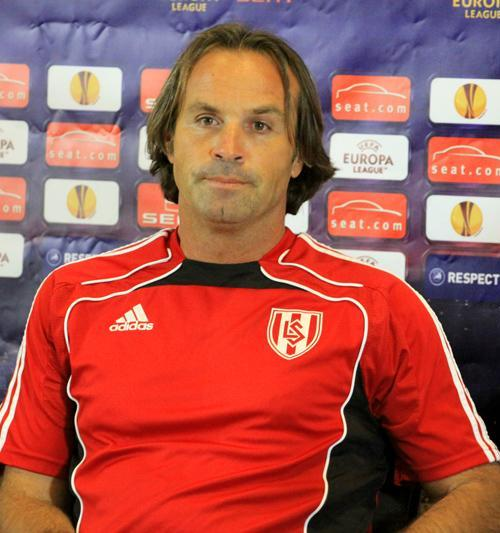

Personal information
- Full name: Martín Rueda Godoy
- Date of birth: 9 January 1963 (age 63)
- Place of birth: Zurich, Switzerland
- Height: 1.71 m (5 ft 7 in)
- Position: Defender

Team information
- Current team: FC Basel (assistant coach)

Senior career*
Years	Team	Apps	(Gls)
1984–1986	Grasshopper	59	(5)
1986–1991	Wettingen	161	(22)
1991–1995	Luzern	133	(20)
1995–1998	Neuchâtel Xamax	72	(6)
Total		425	(53)

International career
1993–1994	Switzerland	5	(0)

Managerial career
- 1999–2000: Wohlen
- 2000–2001: Winterthur
- 2001–2004: Wohlen
- 2004: Aarau
- 2005–2006: Grasshopper U16
- 2006: Grasshopper U18
- 2007–2010: Wohlen
- 2010–2012: Lausanne-Sport
- 2012–2013: Young Boys
- 2013: Dubai
- 2015–2016: Wohlen
- 2016: Wil
- 2020: Neuchâtel Xamax (interim)
- 2023–: Basel (assistant)
- * Club domestic league appearances and goals

Martin Rueda Godoy (born 9 January 1963) is a Swiss former professional footballer and manager who played as a defender. His parents are Spanish and originally from Málaga. His last managing appointment was as interim head coach of Neuchâtel Xamax in the Swiss Super League. He is currently the assistant coach to Fabio Celestini at FC Basel in the Swiss Super League.

Rueda played for Grasshopper Club Zürich, FC Wettingen, FC Luzern, Neuchâtel Xamax and was in the Swiss squad at the 1994 FIFA World Cup. He earned five caps in total.

He previously coached FC Wohlen, FC Winterthur, FC Aarau and Grasshopper Club Zürich U-16 and U-18.
