= Anton Kade =

German footballer (born 2004)

Personal information
- Date of birth: 17 January 2004 (age 22)
- Place of birth: Berlin, Germany
- Height: 1.85 m (6 ft 1 in)
- Position: Winger

Team information
- Current team: FC Augsburg
- Number: 30

Youth career
- –2012: Sportfreunde Kladow
- 2012–2021: Hertha BSC

Senior career*
Years	Team	Apps	(Gls)
2021–2022	Hertha BSC II	6	(1)
2021–2022	Hertha BSC	4	(0)
2022–2023	Basel U21	3	(1)
2022–2025	Basel	88	(9)
2025–	FC Augsburg	33	(7)

International career^{‡}
2019	Germany U16	2	(0)
2020	Germany U17	1	(0)
2021–2024	Germany U19	8	(2)
2024	Germany U20	5	(1)
2025–	Germany U21	6	(1)
- * Club domestic league appearances and goals as of 31 October 2026 ‡ National team caps and goals as of 20:35, 17 November 2026 (UTC)

Anton Kade (born 17 January 2004) is a German professional footballer who plays as a winger for Bundesliga club FC Augsburg.

== Club career ==
Having already entered the professional squad in early 2022, Anton Kade made his professional debut for Hertha BSC on 20 February 2022, replacing Ishak Belfodil in the 76th minute of a Bundesliga game against RB Leipzig.

On 15 June 2022, Swiss Super League club Basel announced the signing of Kade on a four-year contract. He joined Basel's first team for their 2022–23 season under head coach Alexander Frei and made his debut in the Swiss Cup match on 21 August 2022 as Basel won 5–0 against local amateur club FC Allschwil. Kade played his domestic league debut for the club in the away game in the Stade de Genève on 16 October as Basel played a goalless draw with Servette. He scored his first goal for his new club on 3 November in the away game in the Vazgen Sargsyan Republican Stadium in Yerevan as Basel won 2–1 in the group stage of the 2022–23 UEFA Europa Conference League to qualify for the knockout phase.

On 25 August 2025, Kade signed a four-year contract with FC Augsburg.

== Personal life ==
Anton Kade's older brother Julius is also a professional footballer, playing with Dynamo Dresden in 2022.

== Career statistics ==
As of match played 31 October 2026

Appearances and goals by club, season and competition
Club	Season	League			National cup		Europe		Total	
Club	Season	Division	Apps	Goals	Apps	Goals	Apps	Goals	Apps	Goals
Hertha BSC II	2021–22	Regionalliga Nordost	6	1	—		—		6	1
Hertha BSC	2022–23	Bundesliga	4	0	—		—		4	0
Basel U21	2022–23	Swiss Promotion League	2	1	—		—		2	1
Basel U21	2023–24	Swiss Promotion League	1	0	—		—		1	0
Basel U21	Total		3	1	—		—		3	1
Basel	2022–23	Swiss Super League	18	0	3	1	5 (Note: Appearances in UEFA Conference League)	1	26	2
Basel	2023–24	Swiss Super League	30	5	3	0	2	1	35	6
Basel	2024–25	Swiss Super League	36	4	6	1	—		42	5
Basel	2025–26	Swiss Super League	4	0	—		—		4	0
Basel	Total		88	9	12	2	7	2	107	13
Augsburg	2025–26	Bundesliga	28	6	1	0	—		29	6
Augsburg	2026–27	Bundesliga	5	1	2	2	—		7	3
Augsburg	Total		33	7	3	2	—		36	9
Career total			134	18	15	4	7	2	156	24

== Honours ==
Basel

- Swiss Super League: 2024–25

Individual

- Fritz Walter Medal U17 Bronze: 2021
