= Nicolas Vouilloz (footballer) =

Swiss footballer (born 2001)

Personal information
- Date of birth: 11 May 2001 (age 25)
- Place of birth: Chêne-Bougeries, Switzerland
- Height: 1.84 m (6 ft 0 in)
- Position: Defender

Team information
- Current team: FC Basel
- Number: 3

Youth career
- –2020: Servette

Senior career*
Years	Team	Apps	(Gls)
2019–2021	Servette U21	38	(2)
2020–2023	Servette	85	(1)
2024–	Basel	71	(2)

International career^{‡}
2017	Switzerland U16	3	(0)
2017	Switzerland U17	2	(0)
2018–2019	Switzerland U18	3	(0)
2020	Switzerland U20	1	(0)
2021–	Switzerland U21	3	(0)
- * Club domestic league appearances and goals as of 28 September 2026 ‡ National team caps and goals as of 16:00, 30 June 2021 (UTC)

Nicolas Vouilloz (born 11 May 2001) is a Swiss professional footballer who plays as a defender for Swiss club FC Basel in the Swiss Super League. A youth product of Servette FC, he transferred to their league competitors Basel on 5 January 2024.

== Honours ==
Basel

- Swiss Super League: 2024–25
- Swiss Cup: 2024–25

== Career statistics ==
=== Club ===
As of 5 January 2024

Appearances and goals by club, season and competition
Club	Season	League			Cup		Continental		Other		Total	
Club	Season	Division	Apps	Goals	Apps	Goals	Apps	Goals	Apps	Goals	Apps	Goals
Servette	2019–20	Swiss Super League	9	0	0	0	—		—		9	0
Servette	2020–21	Swiss Super League	10	0	1	0	—		—		11	0
Servette	2021–22	Swiss Super League	23	1	3	0	—		—		26	1
Servette	2022–23	Swiss Super League	31	0	2	0	—		—		33	0
Servette	2023–24	Swiss Super League	12	0	0	0	4 (Note: Appearances in the 2023–24 UEFA Europa League)	0	—		16	0
Servette	Total		85	1	6	0	4	0	—		101	1
Basel	2023–24	Swiss Super League	0	0	0	0	—		—		0	0
Career total			85	1	6	0	4	0	0	0	101	1
