= 2021–22 Promotion League =

Swiss Promotion League
- Season: 2021–22
- Champions: Bellinzona
- Promoted: Bellinzona
- Relegated: Black Stars; Sion U-21

The 2021–22 Swiss Promotion League is the 10th season (8th under its current name) of the 3rd tier of the Swiss football league system under its current format.

== Format ==
The Championship had 16 teams, of which four were U-21 teams, the eldest youth teams of the Super or Challenge League clubs. The number of U-21 teams permitted in this division was limited to four (this rule would be would be removed for the following season). The U-21 teams are not eligible to promotion or for a slot in the Swiss Cup. The top placed team, of those eligible, would be promoted and the two teams lowest in the table would be relegated. The season was to be played in two stages. In the first stage each team played a double round robin, one at home and one away against each of the other 15 teams. The table was then divided into three groups the teams taking points and goal difference with them. The top six teams played a single round robin, against the other five, for the promotion slot. The following six teams played once against each other for three Swiss Cup slots. The bottom four teams played twice against the others to decide relegation.

The classification also acts as qualifier for the Swiss Cup. The seven highest ranked (eligible) teams qualify directly to the first round of the 2022–23 Swiss Cup. U-21 teams are not eligible for the Swiss Cup.

== Teams ==
In the previous season Yverdon-Sport became division champions and had been promoted. Münsingen had ended the season in last position and Köniz in second last position and they were both relegated. Therefore, the 2021–22 season saw three new clubs join the division, Chiasso, after suffering relegation from the 2020–21 Swiss Challenge League, and Young Boys U-21 and Biel-Bienne, who had both been promoted from the 1. Liga.

Club	Canton	Stadium	Capacity
Basel U-21	Basel-City	Stadion Rankhof or Youth Campus Basel	7,000; 1,000
FC Bavois	Vaud	Terrain des Peupliers	659
AC Bellinzona	Ticino	Stadio Comunale Bellinzona	5,000
FC Biel-Bienne	Bern	Gurzelen Stadion	5,500
FC Black Stars Basel	Basel-City	Buschwilerhof	1,200
FC Breitenrain Bern	Bern	Spitalacker	1,450
SC Brühl	St. Gallen	Paul-Grüninger-Stadion	4,200
SC Cham	Zug	Stadion Eizmoos	1,800
FC Chiasso	Ticino	Stadio Comunale Riva IV	4,000
Étoile Carouge FC	Geneva	Stade de la Fontenette	3,690
FC Stade Nyonnais	Vaud	Stade de Colovray	7,200
FC Rapperswil-Jona	St. Gallen	Stadion Grünfeld	2,500
Sion U-21	Valais	Stade de Tourbillon	20,200
Young Boys U-21	Bern	Stadion Wankdorf	32,000
SC Young Fellows Juventus	Zürich	Utogrund	2,850
Zürich U-21	Zürich	Sportplatz Heerenschürli	1,120

== League tables ==
=== First stage ===
Pos	Team	Pld	W	D	L	GF	GA	GD	Pts	Qualification or relegation
1	Breitenrain	30	20	7	3	60	29	+31	67	Promotion group
2	Bellinzona	30	19	6	5	58	31	+27	63	Promotion group
3	Chiasso	30	16	9	5	54	30	+24	57	Promotion group
4	Stade Nyonnais	30	16	6	8	67	43	+24	54	Promotion group
5	Zürich U-21	30	12	10	8	46	34	+12	46	Not eligible to promotion
6	Étoile Carouge FC	30	11	11	8	38	36	+2	44	Promotion group
7	FC Bavois	30	12	7	11	44	41	+3	43	Play-off for Swiss Cup slot
8	Cham	30	11	9	10	52	53	−1	42	Play-off for Swiss Cup slot
9	Young Boys U-21	30	10	8	12	48	51	−3	38	Not eligible for Swiss Cup
10	Rapperswil-Jona	30	9	10	11	38	43	−5	37	Play-off for Swiss Cup slot
11	FC Biel-Bienne	30	9	7	14	44	50	−6	34	Play-off for Swiss Cup slot
12	Basel U-21	30	8	6	16	52	71	−19	30	Not eligible for Swiss Cup
13	Black Stars	30	7	8	15	29	49	−20	29	Relegation group
14	YF Juventus	30	7	7	16	40	55	−15	28	Relegation group
15	SC Brühl	30	5	8	17	39	59	−20	23	Relegation group
16	Sion U-21	30	6	5	19	37	71	−34	23	Relegation group

Source: RSSSF
Rules for classification: 1) Points; 2) Goal difference; 3) Goals scored; 4) Head-to-head points; 5) Away goals scored; 6) Draw.

=== Promotion group ===
Pos	Team	Pld	W	D	L	GF	GA	GD	Pts	Qualification or relegation
1	Bellinzona	35	23	7	5	67	35	+32	76	Promotion to 2022–23 Swiss Challenge League
2	Breitenrain	35	22	8	5	66	37	+29	74	Qualification to Swiss Cup
3	Chiasso	35	18	11	6	64	38	+26	65	Qualification to Swiss Cup
4	Stade Nyonnais	35	17	7	11	73	50	+23	58	Qualification to Swiss Cup
5	Zürich U-21	35	14	10	11	54	42	+12	52	Not eligible for Swiss Cup
6	Étoile Carouge FC	35	12	12	11	45	47	−2	48	Qualification to Swiss Cup

Source: RSSSF
Rules for classification: 1) Points; 2) Goal difference; 3) Goals scored; 4) Head-to-head points; 5) Away goals scored; 6) Draw.

=== Qualification group ===
First stage

Pos	Team	Pld	W	D	L	GF	GA	GD	Pts	Qualification or relegation
1	FC Bavois	35	15	7	13	50	51	−1	52	Qualification for Swiss Cup
2	Cham	35	14	9	12	63	62	+1	51	Qualification for Swiss Cup
3	Rapperswil-Jona	35	11	11	13	52	57	−5	44	Qualification for Swiss Cup
4	Young Boys U-21	35	11	9	15	55	64	−9	42	Not eligible for Swiss Cup
5	FC Biel-Bienne	35	11	7	17	56	61	−5	40	
6	Basel U-21	35	11	6	18	72	84	−12	39	Not eligible for Swiss Cup

Source: RSSSF
Rules for classification: 1) Points; 2) Goal difference; 3) Goals scored; 4) Head-to-head points; 5) Away goals scored; 6) Draw.

=== Relegation group ===
Pos	Team	Pld	W	D	L	GF	GA	GD	Pts	Qualification or relegation
1	SC Brühl	36	10	9	17	52	64	−12	39	
2	YF Juventus	36	9	10	17	54	65	−11	37	
3	Black Stars	36	7	10	19	35	61	−26	31	Relegated
4	Sion U-21	36	8	5	23	48	88	−40	29	Relegated

Source: RSSSF
Rules for classification: 1) Points; 2) Goal difference; 3) Goals scored; 4) Head-to-head points; 5) Away goals scored; 6) Draw.
