= Fabio Celestini =

Swiss footballer (born 1975)

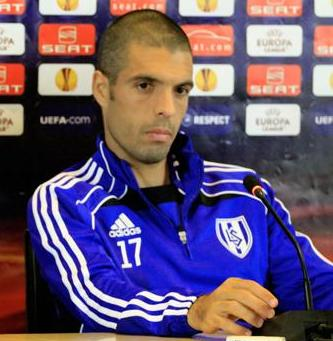
- Celestini with Lausanne-Sport in 2010

Personal information
- Date of birth: 31 October 1975 (age 51)
- Place of birth: Lausanne, Switzerland
- Height: 1.83 m (6 ft 0 in)
- Position: Midfielder

Team information
- Current team: Burnley (head coach)

Youth career
- 1983–1993: Renens

Senior career*
Years	Team	Apps	(Gls)
1993–1995	Renens	48	(8)
1995–2000	Lausanne-Sport	127	(23)
2000–2002	Troyes	50	(2)
2002–2004	Marseille	59	(1)
2004–2005	Levante	25	(1)
2005–2010	Getafe	121	(1)
2010	Lausanne-Sport	13	(1)
2011	Renens		
2011-2012	Malley		
Total		443	(37)

International career
1998–2007	Switzerland	35	(2)

Managerial career
- 2013–2014: Málaga (assistant)
- 2014: Terracina
- 2014–2015: Terracina
- 2015–2018: Lausanne-Sport
- 2018–2019: Lugano
- 2020–2021: Luzern
- 2022–2023: Sion
- 2023–2025: Basel
- 2025–2026: CSKA Moscow
- 2026–: Burnley
- * Club domestic league appearances and goals

Fabio Celestini (born 31 October 1975) is a Swiss football manager and former player who is the head coach of EFL Championship club Burnley. A defensive midfielder, he started and finished his 15-year professional career with Lausanne, and also played for ten years in France and Spain, representing four clubs. He appeared with the Swiss national team at Euro 2004.

After retiring as a player, he moved into management and had periods in charge of Lausanne-Sport, Lugano, Luzern, Sion and Basel in Switzerland and CSKA Moscow in Russia, and Burnley in England, of which he currently is the head coach.

== Club career ==
Born in Lausanne, Celestini started playing professionally with hometown club Lausanne-Sport; he then had a four-season spell in France, spending two years each with Troyes and Marseille. Whilst with the latter, he played the 2004 UEFA Cup final, coming on as a substitute in the second half of the 0–2 loss to Valencia.

Celestini moved to Spain in 2004, playing one season with Levante. After the team's immediate relegation, he stayed in the country, joining fellow La Liga club Getafe, where he never was an undisputed starter, but managed to feature heavily in consecutive seasons. In 2007–08, as the Madrid outskirts side reached the quarter-finals in the UEFA Cup, he scored against Anderlecht in a 2–1 group stage home win.

On 16 February 2010, after having been regularly used in the past two seasons, albeit not as a usual first-choice, the 34-year-old Celestini announced he would not renew his contract with Getafe, choosing to return to Lausanne on a one-year deal. However, due to a break in negotiations over his future role at the club after his playing career, he decided to retire before the end of the campaign, playing his last game on 15 December against Palermo in the Europa League group stage.

== International career ==
A Switzerland international since 1998, Celestini collected 35 caps and was a participant at the UEFA Euro 2004 (appearing in two incomplete matches, as the nation exited in the group stage).

== Managerial career ==
=== Lausanne-Sport ===
On 24 March 2015, after a spell as assistant manager at Spanish club Málaga and head coach with Italian amateurs Terracina; Celestini replaced Marco Simone at Lausanne-Sport in the latter capacity, as the side was in a poor run of results in the Swiss Challenge League. Two months later, he signed a three-year contract.

In 2015–16, Celestini led his team back to the Swiss Super League after a two-year absence.

=== Lugano ===
On 3 October 2018, he was appointed at Lugano in the same division. Just over a year later, he was ousted from his job due to bad results, and replaced by Maurizio Jacobacci.

=== Luzern ===
Celestini signed on as manager of Luzern on 2 January 2020. His contract with the club was terminated on 22 November 2021, after spending the majority of the season in the bottom of the league, having only accrued ten points in 14 games.

=== Sion ===
On 21 November 2022, he took on as new head coach of Sion. He was sacked on 3 March 2023.

=== Basel ===
On 31 October 2023, he was appointed the new head coach of Basel, who sat in last place of the Swiss Super League at the time of his appointment. Just 18 months later, he had led Basel to a domestic double, winning the 2024–25 Swiss Super League and the 2024–25 Swiss Cup. Following these successes, he resigned from his position.

=== CSKA Moscow ===
On 20 June 2025, Celestini signed a contract with Russian club CSKA Moscow for two seasons with an optional third. Celestini's appointment prompted debate in Switzerland due to Russia's invasion of Ukraine and CSKA's links to sanctioned entities. Swiss outlets reported that his decision drew sharp criticism from sections of Basel's support and commentators, while legal analysis discussed whether payments from a sanctioned employer could be blocked by Swiss banks and, in some scenarios, expose him to penalties under Swiss sanctions law. In response to questions about the backlash, Celestini said he intended to focus on football and was unconcerned by criticism unrelated to sport.

In his first competitive game in charge of CSKA, the club won the 2025 Russian Super Cup.

For both of his first two months managing CSKA in the Russian Premier League, he was chosen league's Manager of the Month. CSKA went into Russian season's customary three-month winter break in fourth place, four points below the league leaders. Upon season's resumption in March, CSKA lost four of their five games in league and cup. That was followed by a three-game winning streak in early April. However, CSKA then went on another five-game winless streak to drop to sixth place in the league, 18 points below the top spot (even though they advanced to the Russian Cup League Path final); on 4 May 2026, Celestini left CSKA by mutual consent.

=== Burnley ===
On 28 October 2026, he joined Championship side Burnley as head coach.

== Managerial statistics ==
As of match played 22 November 2026

Managerial record by team and tenure
Team	Nat	From	To	Record							
Team	Nat	From	To	M	W	D	L	GF	GA	GD	Win %
Terracina	(Italy)	1 July 2014	5 November 2014	10	2	5	3	14	19	−5	20.00
Terracina	(Italy)	23 December 2014	21 January 2015	3	1	0	2	3	6	−3	33.33
Lausanne-Sport	(Switzerland)	24 March 2015	20 April 2018	120	44	26	50	189	192	−3	36.67
Lugano	(Switzerland)	3 October 2018	28 October 2019	46	12	17	17	59	57	+2	26.09
Luzern	(Switzerland)	2 January 2020	22 November 2021	79	29	21	29	121	121	+0	36.71
Sion	(Switzerland)	21 November 2022	3 March 2023	6	0	2	4	6	14	−8	0.00
Basel	(Switzerland)	31 October 2023	30 June 2025	73	41	15	17	156	83	+73	56.16
CSKA Moscow	(Russia)	30 June 2025	4 May 2026	40	20	9	11	59	45	+14	50.00
Burnley	(England)	28 October 2026	Present	4	0	3	1	7	8	−1	0.00
Total				381	149	98	134	614	545	+69	39.11

== Honours ==
Basel

- Swiss Super League: 2024–25
- Swiss Cup: 2024–25

CSKA Moscow

- Russian Super Cup: 2025

Individual

- Swiss Super League Manager of the Year: 2016–17
- Russian Premier League Manager of the Month: July/August 2025, September 2025.
