= Timo Schultz =

German footballer (born 1977)

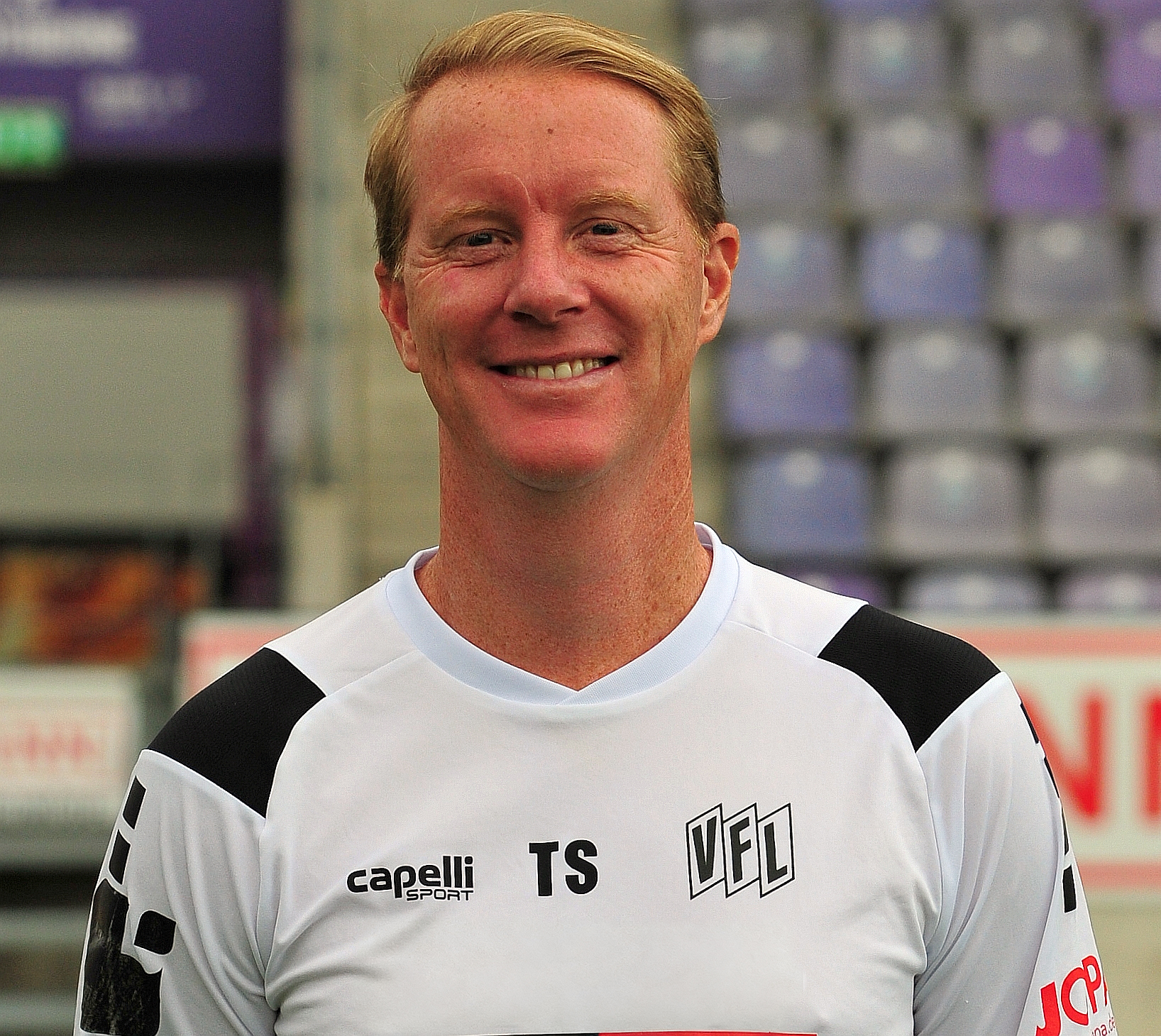
- Schultz in 2025

Personal information
- Date of birth: 26 August 1977 (age 49)
- Place of birth: Wittmund, West Germany
- Height: 1.80 m (5 ft 11 in)
- Position: Midfielder

Team information
- Current team: VfL Osnabrück (head coach)

Youth career
- TuS Esens
- Werder Bremen

Senior career*
| Years | Team | Apps | (Gls) |
| 1996–2000 | Werder Bremen II | 107 | (15) |
| 2000–2002 | VfB Lübeck | 6 | (0) |
| 2003–2005 | Holstein Kiel | 5 | (2) |
| 2004–2005 | Holstein Kiel II | 25 | (9) |
| 2005–2011 | FC St. Pauli | 129 | (10) |
| 2007–2012 | FC St. Pauli II | 18 | (0) |
| Total | | 290 | (36) |

Managerial career
- 2020–2022: FC St. Pauli
- 2023: FC Basel
- 2024: 1. FC Köln
- 2025–: VfL Osnabrück
- * Club domestic league appearances and goals

Timo Schultz (born 26 August 1977) is a German professional football manager who is the current head coach of 2. Bundesliga club VfL Osnabrück.

== Career ==
Born in Wittmund, Schultz is a youth product of Werder Bremen. After playing for the club's reserves for four years, he went on to play for VfB Lübeck and Holstein Kiel.

In 2005, Schultz joined FC St. Pauli as a midfielder. He made his professional debut in the 2. Bundesliga on 10 August 2007 when he started in a game against 1. FC Köln. After the 2009–10 season, St. Pauli was promoted to the Bundesliga, where he debuted on 25 September 2010 against Borussia Dortmund. His career ended in 2012.

Since 2011, Schultz worked in the coaching staff of FC St. Pauli as an assistant coach and youth coach. On 12 July 2020, it was announced that he would be head coach of St. Pauli for the 2020–21 season. This is his first head coaching position of a senior side. His first match was a 4–2 loss to SV Elversberg in the DFB-Pokal. He was sacked in December 2022.

On 12 May 2023, he was announced as FC Basel's new head coach for the upcoming season. His first major challenge with his new club, the UEFA Europa Conference League qualification, proved to be a disappointment, due to a 1–3 home loss to Tobol Kostanay in the first leg of the second qualifying round on 27 July 2023 and their subsequent elimination. On 29 September 2023, the FC Basel board decided to dismiss Schultz due to poor results in the league. At the time of his termination, Basel had won just one out of seven games in the Swiss Super League. In January 2024, he was signed by 1. FC Köln. After the club was relegated, his contract was not extended.

On 17 June 2025, Schultz was named the new head coach for 3. Liga club VfL Osnabrück.

== Managerial record ==
As of match played 7 April 2026

| Team | From | To | Record | | | | | Ref |
| Team | From | To | G | W | D | L | Win % | Ref |
|---|---|---|---|---|---|---|---|---|
| St. Pauli | 12 July 2020 | 6 December 2022 | 92 | 36 | 25 | 31 | 39.13 | |
| Basel | 12 May 2023 | 28 September 2023 | 12 | 4 | 2 | 6 | 33.33 | |
| 1. FC Köln | 4 January 2024 | 27 May 2024 | 18 | 3 | 8 | 7 | 16.67 | |
| VfL Osnabrück | 17 June 2025 | Present | 32 | 19 | 7 | 6 | 59.38 | |
| Total | | | 154 | 62 | 42 | 50 | 40.26 | — |

== Honours ==
=== Managerial ===
VfL Osnabrück

- 3. Liga: 2025–26
