= George Page =

George Page may refer to:

== People ==
- George Page (alpine skier) (1910–2001), American alpine skier
- George Page (Australian footballer) (1905–1974), Australian rules footballer
- George Page (footballer, born 1898) (1898–19??), English football fullback active in the 1920s
- George Page (mayor) (1878–1972), mayor of Nelson, New Zealand, 1935–1941
- George Page (television presenter) (1935–2006), American TV host
- George A. Page Jr., U.S. aircraft designer, designer of the Curtiss-Wright C-46 Commando
- George C. Page (1901–1999), American businessman
- George E. Page (1873–1959), Wisconsin Republican legislator
- George True Page (1859–1941), American federal judge
- George Page (chess player) (1890–1953), Scottish chess master
- George Ham Page (1836–1899), American industrialist

== Ship ==
- CSS George Page, steamship built 1853
