= List of cultural property of national significance in Switzerland: Zug =

This list contains all cultural property of national significance (class A) in the canton of Zug from the 2009 Swiss Inventory of Cultural Property of National and Regional Significance. It is sorted by municipality and contains 16 individual buildings, 10 collections and 5 archaeological finds.

The geographic coordinates provided are in the Swiss coordinate system as given in the Inventory.

== Baar ==
KGS No.^{?}	Picture	Name	Street Address	CH1903 X coordinate	CH1903 Y coordinate	Location
7232	Baarburg Prehistoric-Medieval Hilltop Settlement	Baarburg; Prehistoric-Medieval Hilltop Settlement		684.500	228.800	47.204736°N 8.553937°E
10369	House (Versicherungs-Number 196 a)	House (Versicherungs-Number 196 a)	Sennweid	682.522	228.344	47.200885°N 8.52775°E
Unknown		ISOS Spezialfall: Spinnerei an of the Lorze				

== Cham ==
KGS No.^{?}	Picture	Name	Street Address	CH1903 X coordinate	CH1903 Y coordinate	Location
7253	Catholic Church of St. Jakob	Catholic Church of St. Jakob	Kirchbühl	677.380	225.880	47.179345°N 8.459471°E
7244	Church and Monastery of the Cistercian Nuns	Church and Monastery of the Cistercian Nuns	Frauenthal	674.638	229.627	47.213361°N 8.423922°E
7257	St. Andreas Castle	St. Andreas Castle	St. Andreas 1	677.895	225.830	47.178835°N 8.466256°E
10370	Barn (Versicherungs-Number 110 b)	Barn (Versicherungs-Number 110 b)	Fildernweg 3	676.350	227.175	47.191112°N 8.446104°E
10371	House (Versicherungs-Number 49 a)	House (Versicherungs-Number 49 a)	Bibersee 2	678.205	228.769	47.205232°N 8.470855°E
7245	Ziegelhütte	Ziegelhütte	Meienberg	674.770	227.665	47.1957°N 8.425338°E
Unknown		ISOS Verstädtertes Dorf: Cham				
Unknown		ISOS Dorf: Niederwil				
Unknown		ISOS Spezialfall: Fabrikanlage Lorzenweid				
Unknown		ISOS Spezialfall: Monastery Frauental				

== Hünenberg ==
KGS No.^{?}	Picture	Name	Street Address	CH1903 X coordinate	CH1903 Y coordinate	Location
7262	Catholic Church of St. Wolfgang	Catholic Church of St. Wolfgang		674.980	226.699	47.186988°N 8.427949°E
Unknown		ISOS Weiler: Meisterswil/Talacher				
Unknown		ISOS Spezialfall: St.Wolfgang/Wart				

== Menzingen ==
KGS No.^{?}	Picture	Name	Street Address	CH1903 X coordinate	CH1903 Y coordinate	Location
Unknown		ISOS Spezialfall: Hofsiedlung Brettigen / Schwand				
Unknown		ISOS Spezialfall: Kloster Gubel				

== Neuheim ==
KGS No.^{?}	Picture	Name	Street Address	CH1903 X coordinate	CH1903 Y coordinate	Location
Unknown		ISOS Spezialfall: Hofsiedlung Brettigen / Schwand				

== Risch-Rotkreuz ==
KGS No.^{?}	Picture	Name	Street Address	CH1903 X coordinate	CH1903 Y coordinate	Location
Unknown		ISOS Weiler: Berchtwil				
Unknown		ISOS Spezialfall: Ufersiedlungslandschaft Risch / Buonas				

== Unterägeri ==
KGS No.^{?}	Picture	Name	Street Address	CH1903 X coordinate	CH1903 Y coordinate	Location
Unknown		ISOS Spezialfall: Innere Spinnerei				

== Zug ==
KGS No.^{?}	Picture	Name	Street Address	CH1903 X coordinate	CH1903 Y coordinate	Location
10551, 8595/extendedHtmlPopup 8954, 10551, 8595		Archive of the Amtes Für Denkmalpflege und Archäologie, Archive of Bauernhausforschung and Early History Museum	Hofstrasse 15	681.672	223.796	47.160086°N 8.515709°E
9350	Library of the former Capuchin Monastery of Zug	Library of the former Capuchin Monastery of Zug	Kapuzinergässli 1	681.769	224.526	47.166639°N 8.517121°E
08891		Citizens' Archive of Zug	Rathaus / Ober Altstadt 18 a	681.614	224.406	47.165579°N 8.515055°E
8560/extendedHtmlPopup 7325, 8560	Zug Castle and Museum in the Castle	Zug Castle and Museum in the Castle	Kirchenstrasse 11	681.744	224.351	47.165069°N 8.516759°E
7326	Catholic Church of St. Oswald with Ossuary	Catholic Church of St. Oswald with Ossuary	St. Oswalds-Gasse	681.685	224.367	47.16522°N 8.515984°E
8558	Art Museum	Art Museum	Dorfstrasse 27	681.790	224.336	47.164928°N 8.517363°E
9518	Lehrerseminar St. Michael	Lehrerseminar St. Michael	Zugerbergstrasse 3 a	681.881	224.022	47.162093°N 8.518506°E
9317	Parish Library of St. Michael	Parish Library of St. Michael	St. Oswalds-Gasse 5	681.698	224.404	47.165551°N 8.516162°E
11704	Riedmatt, Neolithic Lake Shore Settlement	Riedmatt, Neolithic Lake Shore Settlement		679.700	225.700	47.177451°N 8.490042°E
8796	State Archives of Zug	State Archives of Zug	Aabachstrasse 5	681.268	225.381	47.174391°N 8.510668°E
10414	City Walls	City Walls		681.653	224.460	47.16606°N 8.515579°E
10372	Rüschenhof Barn (Versicherungs-Number 424 e)	Rüschenhof Barn (Versicherungs-Number 424 e)		682.611	225.181	47.172426°N 8.528345°E
10413	Barn (Versicherungs-Number 424 d)	Barn (Versicherungs-Number 424 d)		682.500	225.225	47.172835°N 8.526889°E
7328	Sumpf, Late-Bronze Age Lake Shore Settlement	Sumpf, Late-Bronze Age Lake Shore Settlement		678.800	226.300	47.182955°N 8.478276°E
8811	Corporate Archives of Landis+Gyr AG	Corporate Archives of Landis+Gyr AG	Gubelstrasse 22	681.522	225.525	47.175655°N 8.514044°E
10373	House (Versicherungs-Number 354 a)	House (Versicherungs-Number 354 a)	Otterswil	680.604	220.346	47.129187°N 8.501011°E
7330	Zurlaubenhof	Zurlaubenhof	Hofstrasse 5	681.747	224.011	47.16201°N 8.516737°E
Unknown		ISOS Stadt: Zug				
Unknown		ISOS Spezialfall: Schönfels / Felsenegg				
