= Adelheid Page =

Swiss businesswoman

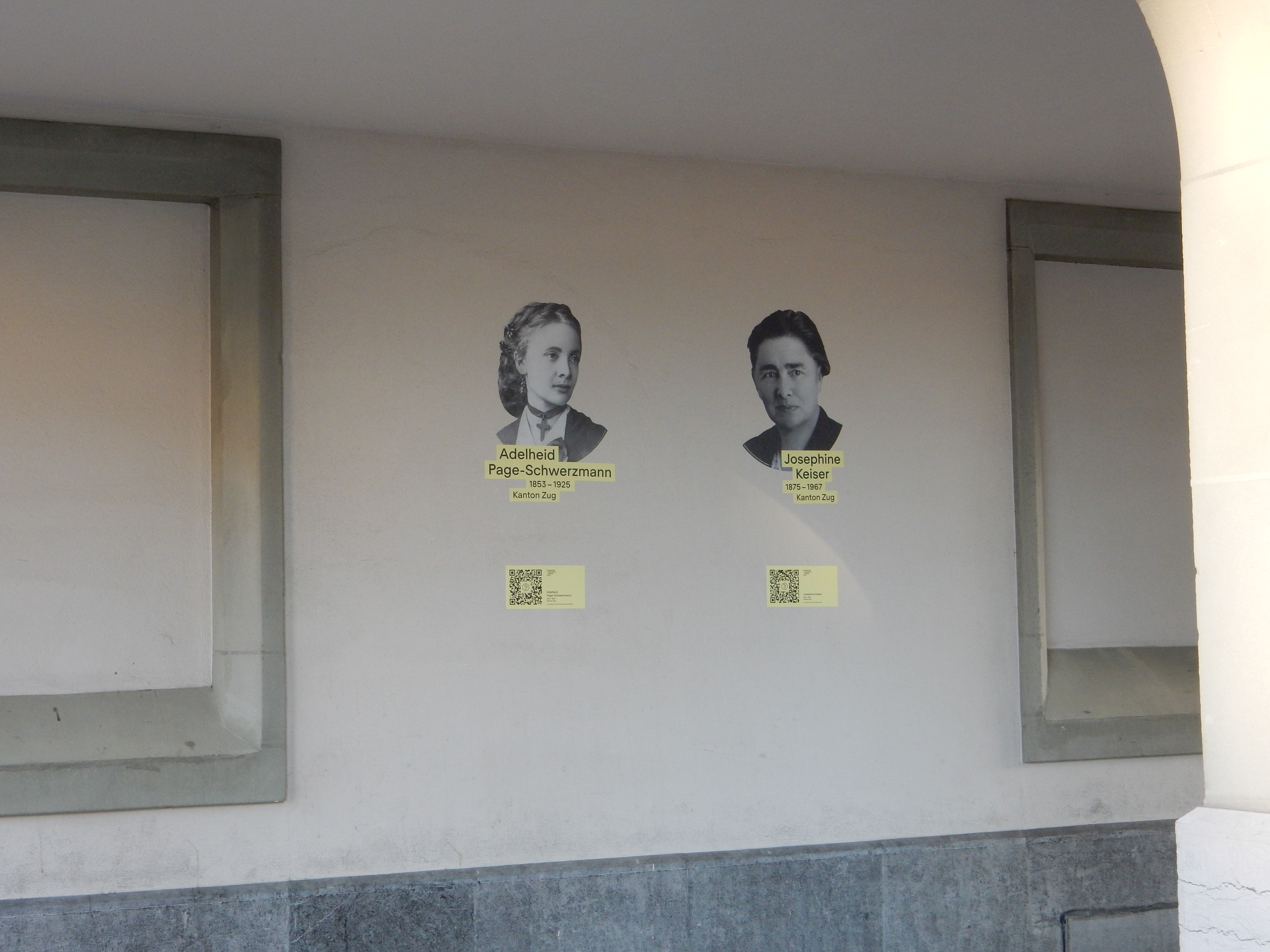
- Adelheid Schwerzmann Page (left)
- Born: Adelheid Schwerzmann; August 20, 1853; Zug, Switzerland
- Died: September 15, 1925 (aged 72); Cham, Zug, Switzerland
- Occupations: Businesswoman, charity worker and philanthropist
- Known for: Philanthropy, member of the Page family
- Spouse: George Ham Page (m. 1875; died 1899)
- Children: 1

Adelheid Page (née Schwerzmann; August 20, 1853 – September 15, 1925) was a Swiss businesswoman, charity worker and philanthropist. She was married to George Ham Page, co-founder of the Anglo-Swiss Condensed Milk Company, a predecessor of Nestlé.

== Early life and education ==
Page was born Adelheid "Heidi" Schwerzmann in Zug, Switzerland, to Carl Caspar and Agatha (née Weiss) Schwerzmann. Her parents operated a glass store and her father was also working as tour guide. She was raised in an upper middle class family and attended a private school in Zug and a boarding school in Vevey. From an early age she was interested in arts and cultures and languages.

== Career ==
After marrying her husband, Adelheid initially worked in the management department of the company of her husband and besides that led various charity and philanthropic projects. After the death of her husband in 1899, she initially took over the leadership of the company, until her son Fred would be able to do so. However, in 1905 she decided to accept the merger with Nestlé and to sell the company, something her husband never wanted or would have approved of.

In 1909, she endowed funds to build an hospital to treat tuberculosis, after being affected by an appendicitis. The completed pulmonary sanatorium was taken over by the non-profit society of Zug in 1912. Until her death she was active through supporting various endowments of the arts and culture.

=== St. Andreas Castle ===
In 1902/1903, Page had strong intentions to buying the St. Andreas Castle in Cham, Switzerland. She had to use two front man to achieve this goal. She engaged the State Councilor Jakob Hildebrand and National Councilor Klemens Iten which purchase the castle in her name. On her 50th birthday on August 20, 1903, she was able to enter the castle for the first time as owner. Between 1903 and 1907 she had the castle restored for a sum of 1.6 million Swiss francs (which would be equivalent to 16 million in 2023).

== Personal life ==
In 1875, aged 22, she married the American industrialist George Ham Page, who founded the Anglo-Swiss Condensed Milk Company ten years prior in 1866. He was 17 years her senior. They had one son, George Harte Page (January 23, 1877 – January 9, 1930), an architect who married Italian-born Lisina (née Martinelli). They had two children: Monica (1907–1995) and George Hugh (1910–2001). He was among the richest Swiss citizens at the time.

After the birth of her son, Adelheid moved to New York City and Paris, where she enjoyed a more cosmopolitan lifestyle.
