= George Ham Page =

American industrialist (1836–1899)

- Page c. 1895
- Born: George Ham Page; May 16, 1836; Dixon, Illinois, U.S.
- Died: April 20, 1899 (aged 62); Cham, Switzerland
- Education: Rock River Seminary; Iowa Conference Seminary
- Occupations: Industrialist, teacher, farmer
- Known for: Founding and leading Anglo-Swiss Condensed Milk Company
- Spouse: Adelheid Schwerzmann (m. 1875)
- Children: 1
- Relatives: Charles A. Page (brother); Louis Coues Page (nephew)

George Ham Page colloquially General Page (May 16, 1836 - April 20, 1899) was an American industrialist who co-founded the Anglo-Swiss Condensed Milk Company in 1866, a predecessor of Nestlé. He was primarily active in Switzerland. He was the grandfather and namesake of alpine skier George Page.

== Early life and education ==
Page was born May 16, 1836, in Palmyra Township in Dixon, Illinois to John Ham and Julia Page (née Fellows). His parents were both born in New Hampshire and moved into a log cabin in the predominantly native American west of Illinois. His maternal family hailed from Sandwich, New Hampshire while his paternal family was from Rochester. He had a very modest upbringing and attended the school of the settlers before enrolling at Rock River Seminary (today Mount Morris College) and the Iowa Conference Seminary (today Cornell College) in Mount Vernon, Iowa which was founded by his maternal uncle Samuel Fellows.

== Career ==
In 1854, aged 18, he began teaching after his uncle and his wife hired him to teach at the Iowa Conference Seminary. However he did not like his new teaching profession and he returned to his fathers farm in Palmyra, Illinois. During the American Civil War, in 1861, he worked briefly as secretary in the Department of Military Affairs in Washington, D.C. In 1866, he joins his brother Charles A. Page (1838–1873), in Europe.

In 1866, Page and his younger brother Charles formed the Anglo-Swiss Condensed Milk Company in Cham, Switzerland. Back then this was the first and only manufacturing plant for evaporated milk in Europe. Initially, the company is called The Alpine Condensed Milk Company and the co-founders of the corporation with capital of 100,000 Swiss Francs are listed as: David Hilton Wheeler, president and secretary; Philippe E. Lockwood, resident of Wohlen and owner of the Hilfikon Castle; L.P. Merriam; James Kerez-Parvacini, the only Swiss citizen among the founders; Charles Albert and George Ham Page. George's stake in the company is initially only 4% for which he paid 4,000 Swiss Francs which was a considerable risk for him who previously made $1,500 per year while working in the government agency in Washington, D.C.

== Personal life ==
In 1875, Page married Swiss Adelheid Schwerzmann (1853–1925), who originally hailed from Zug. His wife was mostly known as socialite and philanthropist after the death of her late husband. She purchased St. Andreas Castle in 1906. They had one son;

- Fred Harte Page (January 23, 1877 - January 9, 1930) who married Lisina Martinelli at St. Andreas Castle which was owned by his mother Adelheid Page on January 17, 1906. They had two children: Monica (1907–1995) and George Hugh (1910–2001). He was among the richest Swiss citizens of the time.

Page who travelled frequently between the United States and Switzerland at the time died suddenly and unexpected while on vacation in Switzerland at his Villa Cottage in Cham aged almost 63. Due to Page being Methodist he was not truly accepted into the Catholic community of Zug. Therefore, the local pastor did not want to have a ceremony to happen locally. Page was buried in Dixon, Illinois on May 13, 1899. Generally speaking Page was not well integrated in Swiss society and kept his life private. Despite living in Switzerland for many decades he couldn't speak Swiss German (and only rudimentary German). His younger brother, David Steven Page (1844–1903), was the opposite of his elder brother in this regards.

== Literature ==
- Orsouw, Michael van; Stadlin, Judith; Imboden, Monika: George Page, der Milch-Pionier (Vevey/Zürich, 2004) in German
- Page-Scherzmann, George Ham (1836–1899) In: Chamapedia (in German)
