= George Page (alpine skier) =

American alpine skier (1910–2001)

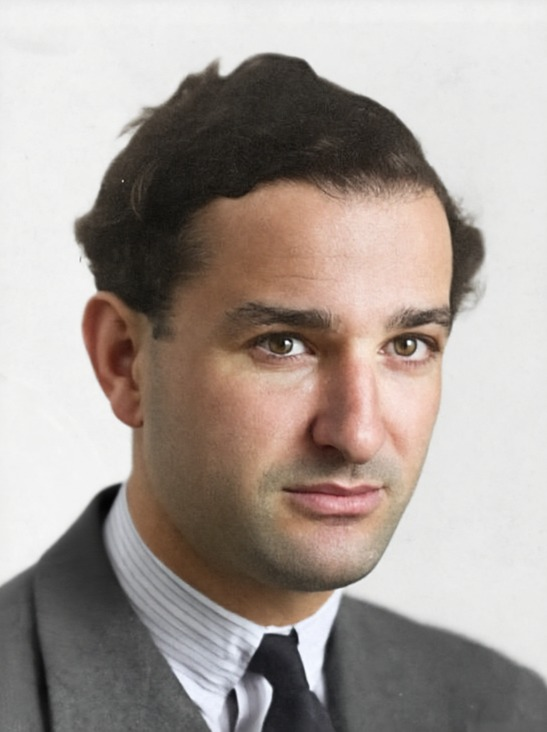

Personal information
- Nationality: (United States)
- Born: May 17, 1910 Cham, Switzerland
- Died: September 2001 (aged 91) Zürich, Switzerland

Sport
- Sport: Skiing
- Club: New York Amateur Ski Club

George Hugh Page (May 17, 1910 – September 2001) was an American alpine skier who competed in the 1936 Winter Olympics. He was born in Cham, Switzerland. In 1936 he finished 13th in the alpine skiing combined event. Page was a grandson of George Ham Page, co-founder of the Anglo-Swiss Condensed Milk Company, a predecessor company from Nestlé.

== Life ==
Page was born in 1910 in Cham, Switzerland to Fred Harte and Lisina (née Martinelli). His father was the only son of George Ham Page and his Swiss-born wife, Adelheid (née Schwerzmann) Page. His grandfather was one of the co-founders of the Anglo-Swiss Condensed Milk Company, a predecessor of Nestlé. His paternal grandmother owned St. Andreas Castle where he partially was raised.
