= Charles A. Page =

American diplomat (1838–1873)

Consul of the United States to Zurich, Switzerland
- In office 1865–1869

Personal details
- Born: Charles Albert Page; May 22, 1838 Dixon, Illinois, U.S.
- Died: May 26, 1873 (aged 35) London, England
- Spouse: Grace Darling Coues (m. 1869)
- Relations: George Ham Page (brother)
- Children: 4, including Louis
- Occupation: Businessman, diplomat, journalist

Charles Albert Page (22 May 1838 – 26 May 1873) was an American businessman and diplomat who served as Consul of the United States in Zurich from 1865 to 1869. He was one of the founders of the Anglo-Swiss Condensed Milk Company, precursor to Nestlé.

== Personal life ==
On 15 October 1869, Page married Grace Darling Coues (1847–1925), a daughter of Samuel Elliott Coues (1797–1867) and Charlotte Haven Coues (née Ladd; 1813–1900). She was a sister of a renowned Boston literary critic. They had four children;

- Louis Coues Page (1869–1956), colloquially L.C. Page, married firstly to Kate Stearns (1873–1963), of Brookline, Massachusetts. He married secondly to Mildred Frances Parker (born 1873). He did not have children.
- Charles Fellows Page (1870–1948), married firstly to Frances Ford Benjamin (1876–1960), secondly married to Leigh Reynolds Kyle (1881–1961). He had two children from his first marriage.
- Charlotte Ladd Page (1870–1934), married John Warren Stearns (1866–1927). They had six children.
- George Alfred Page (1872–1927), married Mabel Hurd (1875–1928), of Brookline, with whom he had three children.

Page died 26 May 1873 in London, England, aged 35.
