= Villmergen =

- Municipality
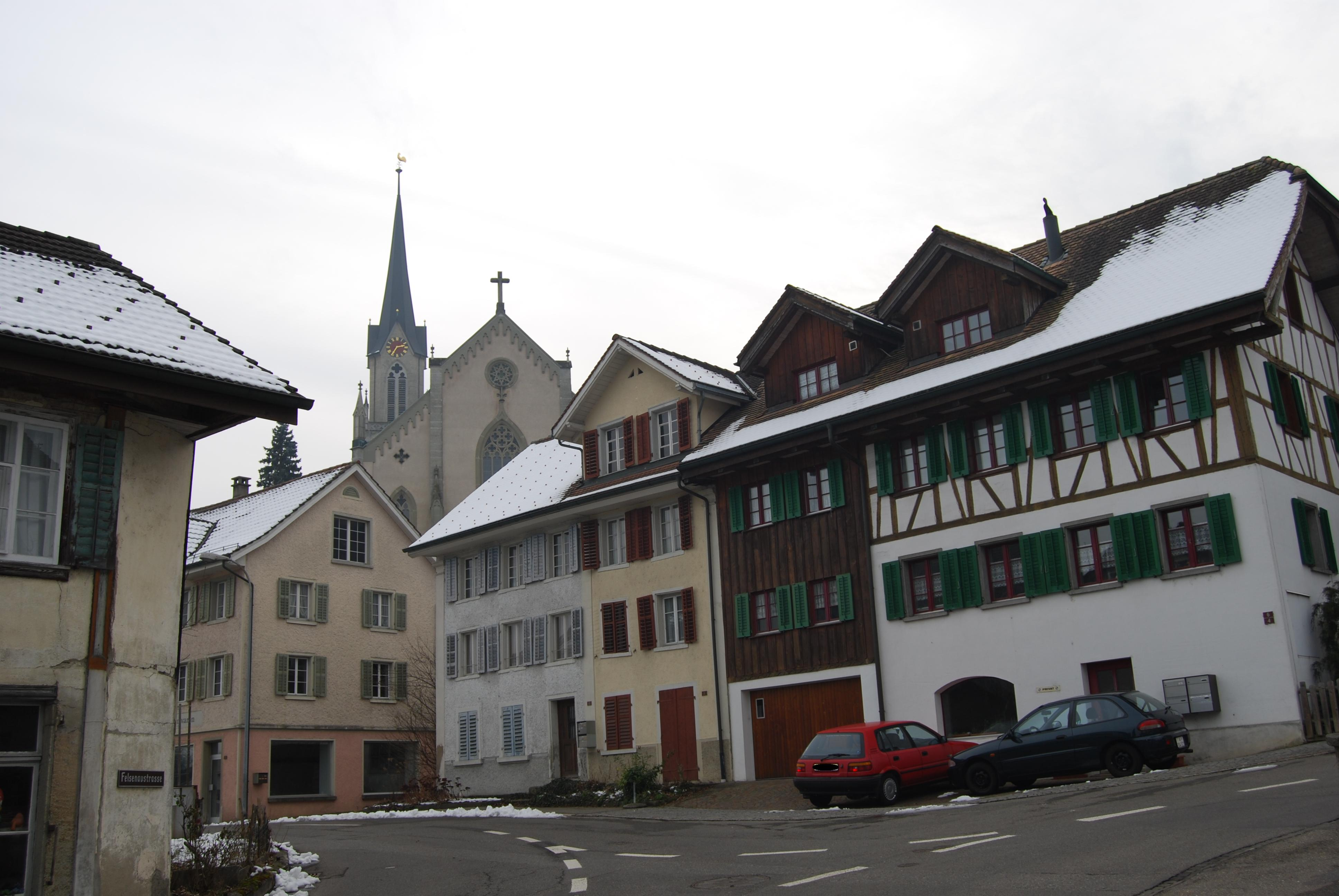
- Villmergen village center

- Flag Coat of arms
- Location of Villmergen
- Location within Switzerland Location within Canton of Aargau
- Coordinates: 47°21′N 8°15′E
- Country: Switzerland
- Canton: Aargau
- District: Bremgarten

Area
  - Total: 10.28 km^{2} (3.97 sq mi)
- Elevation: 437 m (1,434 ft)

Population (December 2020)
  - Total: 7,668
  - Density: 745.9/km^{2} (1,932/sq mi)
- Time zone: UTC+01:00 (CET)
  - Summer (DST): UTC+02:00 (CEST)
- Postal code: 5612
- SFOS number: 4080
- ISO 3166 code: CH-AG
- Surrounded by: Büttikon, Dintikon, Dottikon, Egliswil, Hendschiken, Hilfikon, Seengen, Wohlen
- Website: villmergen.ch

Villmergen is a municipality in the district of Bremgarten in the canton of Aargau in Switzerland.

Two famous battles took place at Villmergen.

In 2010, Hilfikon merged into Villmergen.

== History ==
The area was first settled between 500 and 58 BC, but no records and little evidence survives of that settlement. During the Roman era there were at least two villas, one at Heidenhübel and the other on the Schwarzhalde. The first mention of the modern village was in 1185, as Vilmaringen. In 1273, the Counts of Kyburger sold Villmergen to the House of Habsburg. A Kyburg Castle was mentioned in the village in 1315, but no clear evidence of this castle has been discovered. Most likely, it was on the Heidenhübel, south-west of the village, since a square foundation was discovered there in 1927.

In 1337, the patronage right to the village church was held by the knightly family of Hallwyl. In 1425, the rights to the church transferred to the Benedictine Muri Abbey. In 1525 to 1531, the Protestant Reformation entered the village, but much of the population stayed Catholic. On 24 January 1656 and again on 24 July 1712, the First War of Villmergen and the Toggenburg War (or Second War of Villmergen) were fought near the village. both battles were between the Reformed and Catholic Swiss cantons. The Protestants' victory in the Second Battle of Villmergen, brought an end to the Catholic hegemony in the Swiss Confederation and prevented further conflict until the renewed outbreak of civil war until 1847. That year, the Sonderbund War led to the formation of Switzerland as a federal state.

Under the short-lived Helvetic Republic, Villmergen was part of the District of Sarmenstorf in 1798. Five years later, under the Act of Mediation, it became part of the Bremgarten District. In 1841, the local monastery was secularised. During the Sonderbund War, was a battle between cantonal forces and local militia troops in the municipality. The battle ended with seven dead and one wounded.

On 1 January 2010, the formerly-independent Municipality of Hilfikon merged into Villmergen and became the Village of Hilfikon in the Municipality of Villmergen.

== Geography ==
Aerial view from 400 m by Walter Mittelholzer (1925)

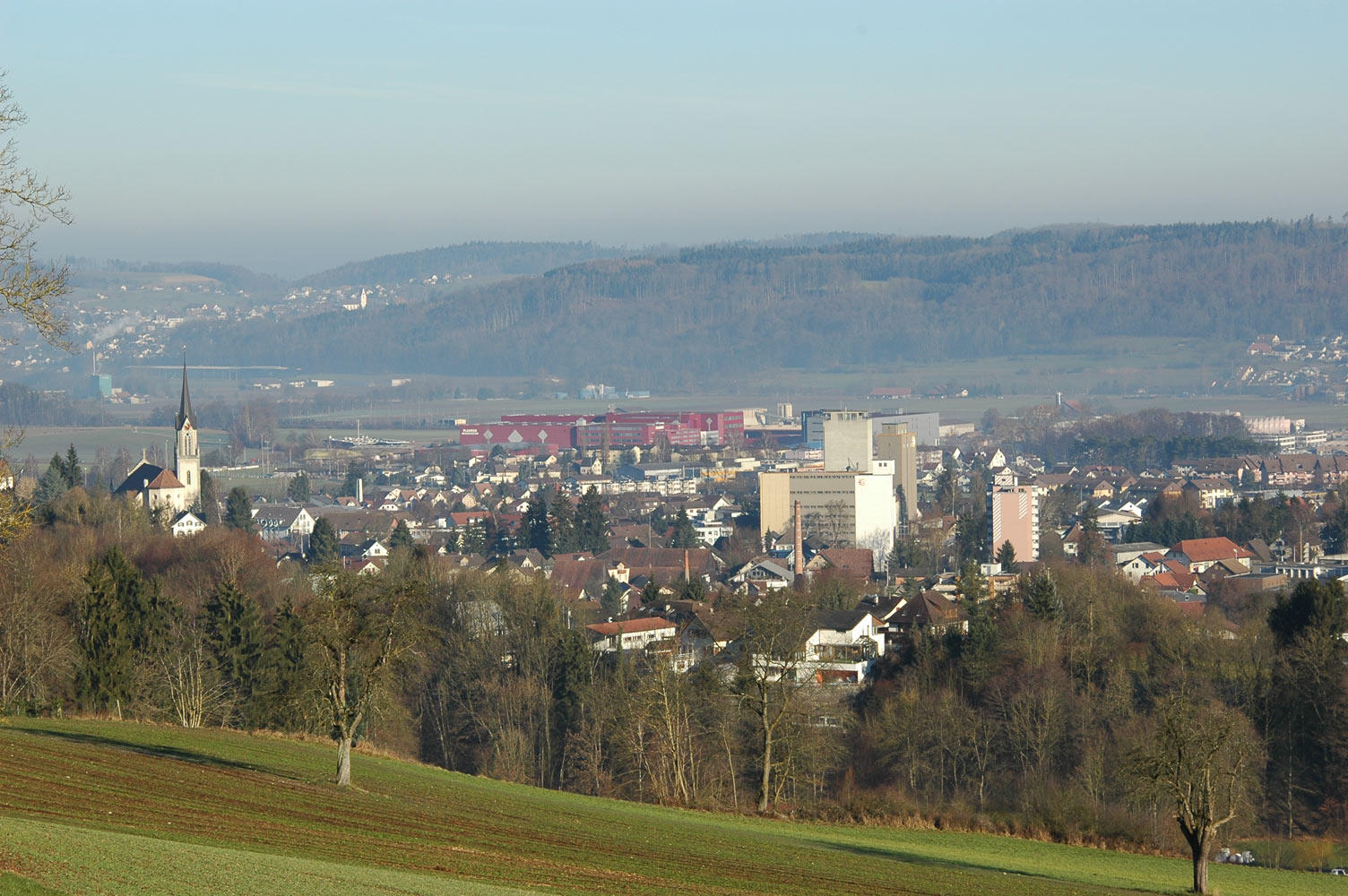
Villmergen Panorama

Villmergen has an area, as of 2006, of 10.2 square kilometers (3.9 sq mi). Of this area, 41.6% is used for agricultural purposes, while 35.9% is forested. Of the rest of the land, 22.3% is settled (buildings or roads) and the remainder (0.2%) is non-productive (rivers or lakes).

== Coat of arms ==
The blazon of the municipal coat of arms is Argent a Rose Gules barbed and seeded proper.

== Demographics ==
Historical population
Year	Pop.	±%
1798	888	—
1803	998	+12.4%
1854	1,594	+59.7%
1900	1,785	+12.0%
1930	2,707	+51.7%
1950	2,812	+3.9%
1960	3,232	+14.9%
1970	4,222	+30.6%
1975	4,401	+4.2%
1980	4,079	−7.3%
1990	4,641	+13.8%
2000	5,078	+9.4%

Villmergen has a population (as of 31 December 2020) of 7,668. As of 2008, 24.4% of the population was made up of foreign nationals. Over the last 10 years (1997–2007) the population has changed at a rate of 6.1%. Most of the population (as of 2000) speaks German (86.1%), with Italian being second most common ( 5.7%) and Albanian being third ( 1.4%).

The age distribution, as of 2008, in Villmergen is; 573 children or 10.4% of the population are between 0 and 9 years old and 644 teenagers or 11.7% are between 10 and 19. Of the adult population, 770 people or 14.0% of the population are between 20 and 29 years old. 803 people or 14.6% are between 30 and 39, 961 people or 17.4% are between 40 and 49, and 756 people or 13.7% are between 50 and 59. The senior population distribution is 495 people or 9.0% of the population are between 60 and 69 years old, 294 people or 5.3% are between 70 and 79, there are 189 people or 3.4% who are between 80 and 89, and there are 23 people or 0.4% who are 90 and older.

As of 2000, there were 161 homes with 1 or 2 persons in the household, 1,050 homes with 3 or 4 persons in the household, and 753 homes with 5 or more persons in the household. The average number of people per household was 2.47 individuals. In 2008 there were 986 single family homes (or 40.9% of the total) out of a total of 2,411 homes and apartments. There were a total of 81 empty apartments for a 3.4% vacancy rate. As of 2007, the construction rate of new housing units was 3.2 new units per 1000 residents.

In the 2007 federal election the most popular party was the SVP which received 40.2% of the vote. The next three most popular parties were the FDP (20.6%), the CVP (15.3%) and the SP (12%).

In Villmergen about 67.4% of the population (between age 25–64) have completed either non-mandatory upper secondary education or additional higher education (either university or a Fachhochschule). Of the school age population (in the 2008/2009 school year), there are 359 students attending primary school, there are 182 students attending secondary school in the municipality.

== Heritage sites of national significance ==
Schloss Hilfikon and chapel, in Hilfikon village, are listed as a Swiss heritage site of national significance. In Villmergen proper, there are three more heritage sites of national significance. These sites are; the farm house at Halde, the main building of the former Bally factory at Bahnhofstrasse 66, and the Catholic parish church on Kirchgasse.

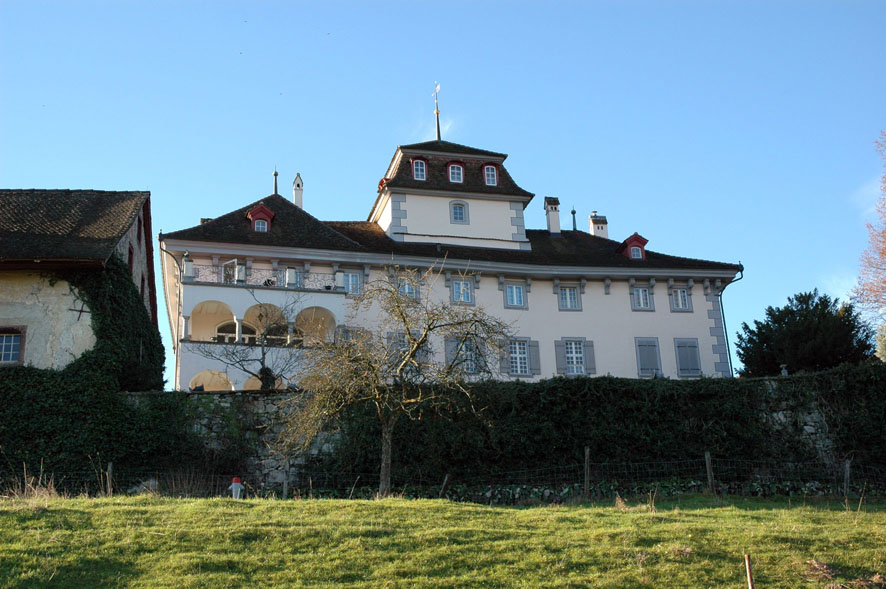
Castle Hilfikon in Hilfikon village

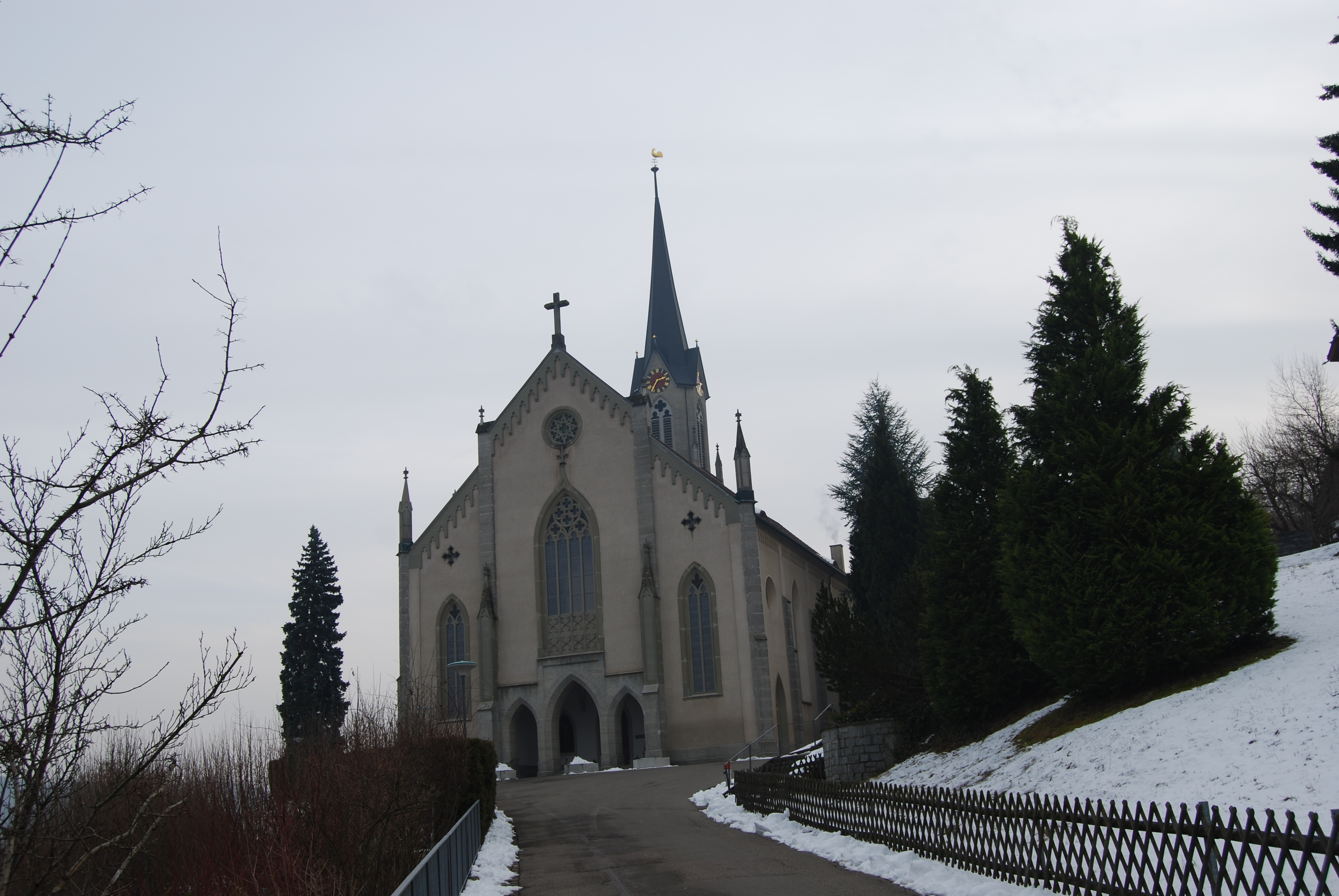
Catholic Church of Villmergen

== Economy ==
As of 2007, Villmergen had an unemployment rate of 2.14%. As of 2005, there were 100 people employed in the primary economic sector and about 29 businesses involved in this sector. 1,237 people are employed in the secondary sector and there are 73 businesses in this sector. 1,477 people are employed in the tertiary sector, with 167 businesses in this sector.

As of 2000 there was a total of 2,735 workers who lived in the municipality. Of these, 1,985 or about 72.6% of the residents worked outside Villmergen while 1,336 people commuted into the municipality for work. There were a total of 2,086 jobs (of at least 6 hours per week) in the municipality. Of the working population, 9.5% used public transportation to get to work, and 55.5% used a private car.

== Religion ==
From the 2000 census, 3,239 or 63.8% were Roman Catholic, while 957 or 18.8% belonged to the Swiss Reformed Church. Of the rest of the population, there were 3 individuals (or about 0.06% of the population) who belonged to the Christian Catholic faith.
