= Louis Coues Page =

US publisher

Louis C. Page
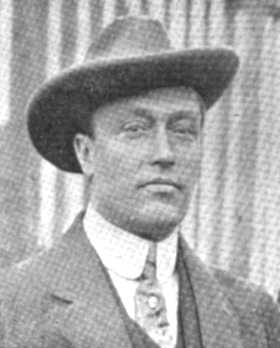
- Born: Louis Coues Page; January 13, 1869; Zurich, Switzerland
- Died: May 9, 1959 (aged 90); Brookline, Massachusetts, U.S.
- Resting place: Portsmouth, New Hampshire, U.S.
- Occupations: Businessman, publisher
- Known for: Founding and leading The Page Company; Owner of the Boston Braves
- Spouses: Kate Stearns (m. 1895, divorced); Mildred Frances Page (m. 1904)
- Father: Charles A. Page
- Relatives: George Ham Page (uncle)

Louis Coues Page (January 13, 1869 – May 9, 1959), also known as Louis C. Page, was a Swiss-born American businessman and publisher who founded The Page Company (later Farrar, Straus & Cudahy). He was also a co-owner of the Boston Braves.

== Early life and education ==
Page was born 13 January 1869 in Zurich, Switzerland, the oldest of four children, to Charles A. Page, an American businessman and diplomat, and Grace Darling Page (née Coues; 1847–1925).

His father served as American consul to Zurich, Switzerland, between 1865 and 1869. During his tenure he represented economic interests and co-founded the Anglo-Swiss Condensed Milk Company, a precursor to Nestlé. His uncle, George Ham Page, was also among the co-founders. His mother was a native of Portsmouth, New Hampshire.

The family relocated to London, where Page and his siblings were raised, after the death of his father. He moved back to Brookline, Massachuetts in 1883. There he graduated from high school and attended Harvard College.

== Career ==
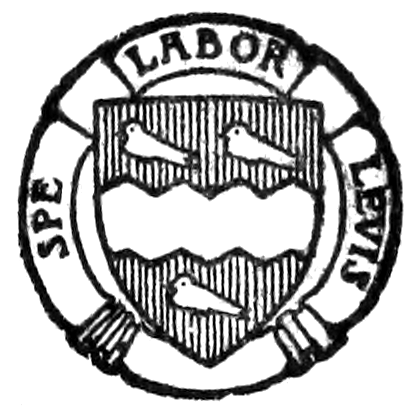
L.C. Page & Company logo, ca.1909

After graduation, he worked for Boston publishers Estes & Lauriat, 1891–1892. In 1896 he bought the Joseph Knight Company and renamed it L.C. Page & Company; around 1914 it became The Page Company. It issued works of "art, travel, music, belles lettres" and fiction for adults and children. It operated from offices on Beacon Street in Beacon Hill. Authors published by the firm included Bliss Carman, Julia Caroline Dorr, Lucy Maud Montgomery, and Eleanor H. Porter. In 1914 the Page Company acquired Dana Estes & Co.

Around the 1910s Louis and his brother George A. Page were co-owners of the Boston Braves baseball team. Farrar, Straus & Cudahy acquired L.C. Page & Co. in 1957; the imprint continued until 1980.

== Personal life ==
Page married Kate Stearns (1873–1963) in 1895. The marriage ended in divorce. In 1904, Page secondly married to Mildred Frances Parker (born 1873). He did not have any children.
