= Büttikon =

- Municipality
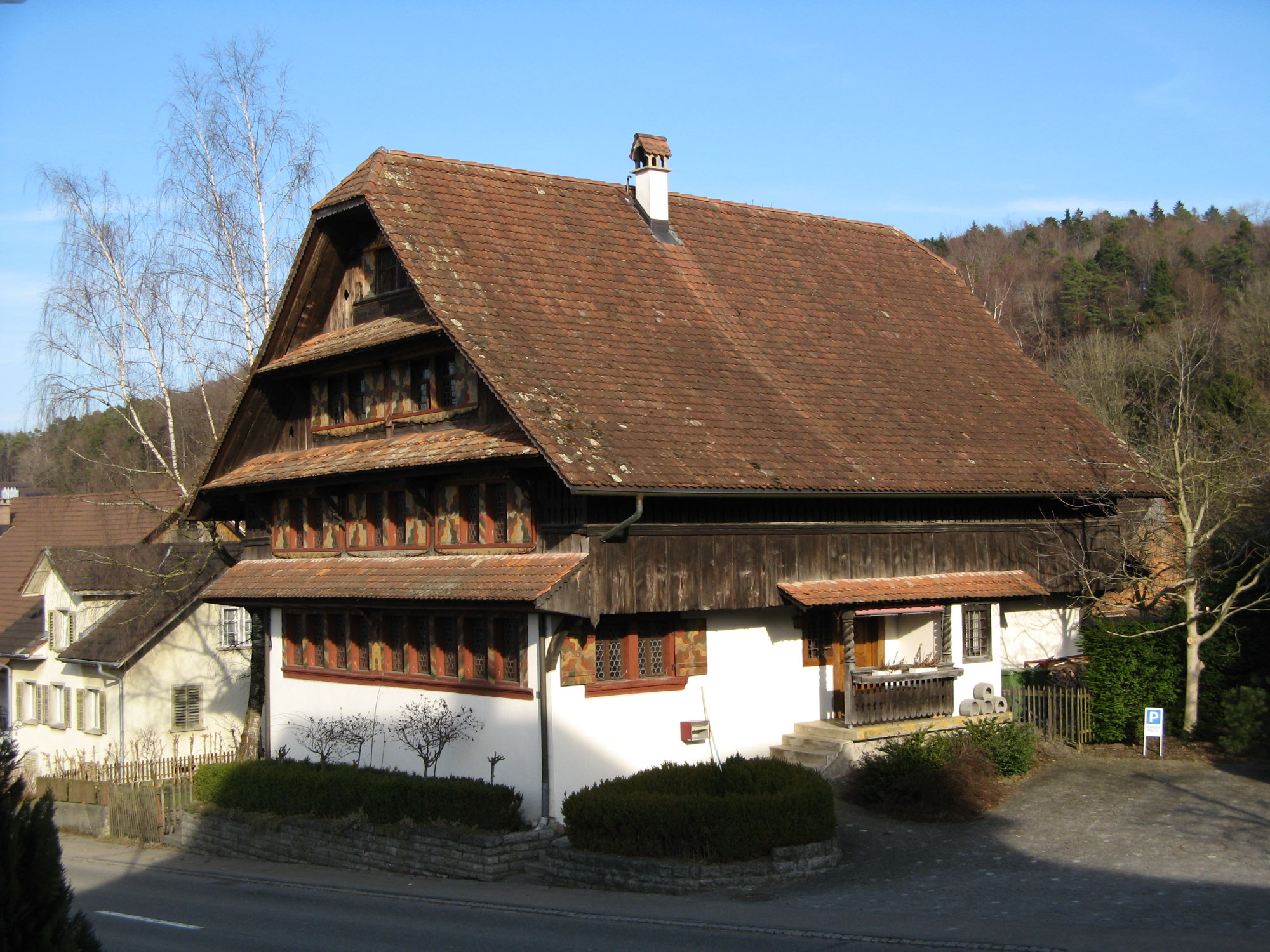

- Flag Coat of arms
- Location of Büttikon
- Location within Switzerland Location within Canton of Aargau
- Coordinates: 47°20′N 8°16′E
- Country: Switzerland
- Canton: Aargau
- District: Bremgarten

Area
  - Total: 2.82 km^{2} (1.09 sq mi)
- Elevation: 498 m (1,634 ft)

Population (December 2020)
  - Total: 1,061
  - Density: 376/km^{2} (974/sq mi)
- Time zone: UTC+01:00 (CET)
  - Summer (DST): UTC+02:00 (CEST)
- Postal code: 5619
- SFOS number: 4064
- ISO 3166 code: CH-AG
- Surrounded by: Hilfikon, Sarmenstorf, Uezwil, Villmergen, Waltenschwil, Wohlen
- Website: https://www.buettikon.ch/ SFSO statistics

Büttikon is a municipality in the district of Bremgarten in the canton of Aargau in Switzerland.

Aerial view (1953)

== History ==
Büttikon is first mentioned in 924 as Putinchova.

== Geography ==
Büttikon has an area, as of 2006, of 2.8 square kilometers (1.1 sq mi). Of this area, 56.5% is used for agricultural purposes, while 33.6% is forested. The rest of the land, (9.9%) is settled.

The municipality is located in the Bremgarten district between two ridges that come off the Lindenberg. It consists of the linear village of Büttikon.

== Coat of arms ==
The blazon of the municipal coat of arms is Bendy of Six Gules and Argent semee bendwise of Helmets Azure.

== Demographics ==
Büttikon has a population (as of 31 December 2020) of 1,061. As of 2008, 18.3% of the population was made up of foreign nationals. Over the last 10 years the population has grown at a rate of 25.5%. Most of the population (as of 2000) speaks German (95.9%), with Macedonian being second most common ( 1.2%) and French being third ( 0.5%).

The age distribution, as of 2008, in Büttikon is; 107 children or 12.7% of the population are between 0 and 9 years old and 83 teenagers or 9.8% are between 10 and 19. Of the adult population, 97 people or 11.5% of the population are between 20 and 29 years old. 140 people or 16.6% are between 30 and 39, 156 people or 18.5% are between 40 and 49, and 127 people or 15.0% are between 50 and 59. The senior population distribution is 68 people or 8.1% of the population are between 60 and 69 years old, 55 people or 6.5% are between 70 and 79, there are 10 people or 1.2% who are between 80 and 89, and there is 1 person who is 90 or older.

As of 2000 the average number of residents per living room was 0.55 which is about equal to the cantonal average of 0.57 per room. In this case, a room is defined as space of a housing unit of at least 4 m^{2} (43 sq ft) as normal bedrooms, dining rooms, living rooms, kitchens and habitable cellars and attics. About 70.4% of the total households were owner occupied, or in other words did not pay rent (though they may have a mortgage or a rent-to-own agreement). As of 2000, there were 12 homes with 1 or 2 persons in the household, 83 homes with 3 or 4 persons in the household, and 152 homes with 5 or more persons in the household. The average number of people per household was 2.62 individuals. In 2008 there were 163 single family homes (or 44.3% of the total) out of a total of 368 homes and apartments. There were a total of 2 empty apartments for a 0.5% vacancy rate. As of 2007, the construction rate of new housing units was 2.5 new units per 1000 residents.

In the 2007 federal election the most popular party was the SVP which received 47% of the vote. The next three most popular parties were the CVP (15.5%), the FDP (13.9%) and the SP (9.5%).

The entire Swiss population is generally well educated. In Büttikon about 78.4% of the population (between age 25-64) have completed either non-mandatory upper secondary education or additional higher education (either University or a Fachhochschule). Of the school age population (in the 2008/2009 school year), there are 87 students attending primary school in the municipality.

The historical population is given in the following table:

Historical population
Year	Pop.	±%
1850	273	—
1900	254	−7.0%
1950	316	+24.4%
1960	314	−0.6%
1990	618	+96.8%
2000	656	+6.1%

== Heritage sites of national significance ==
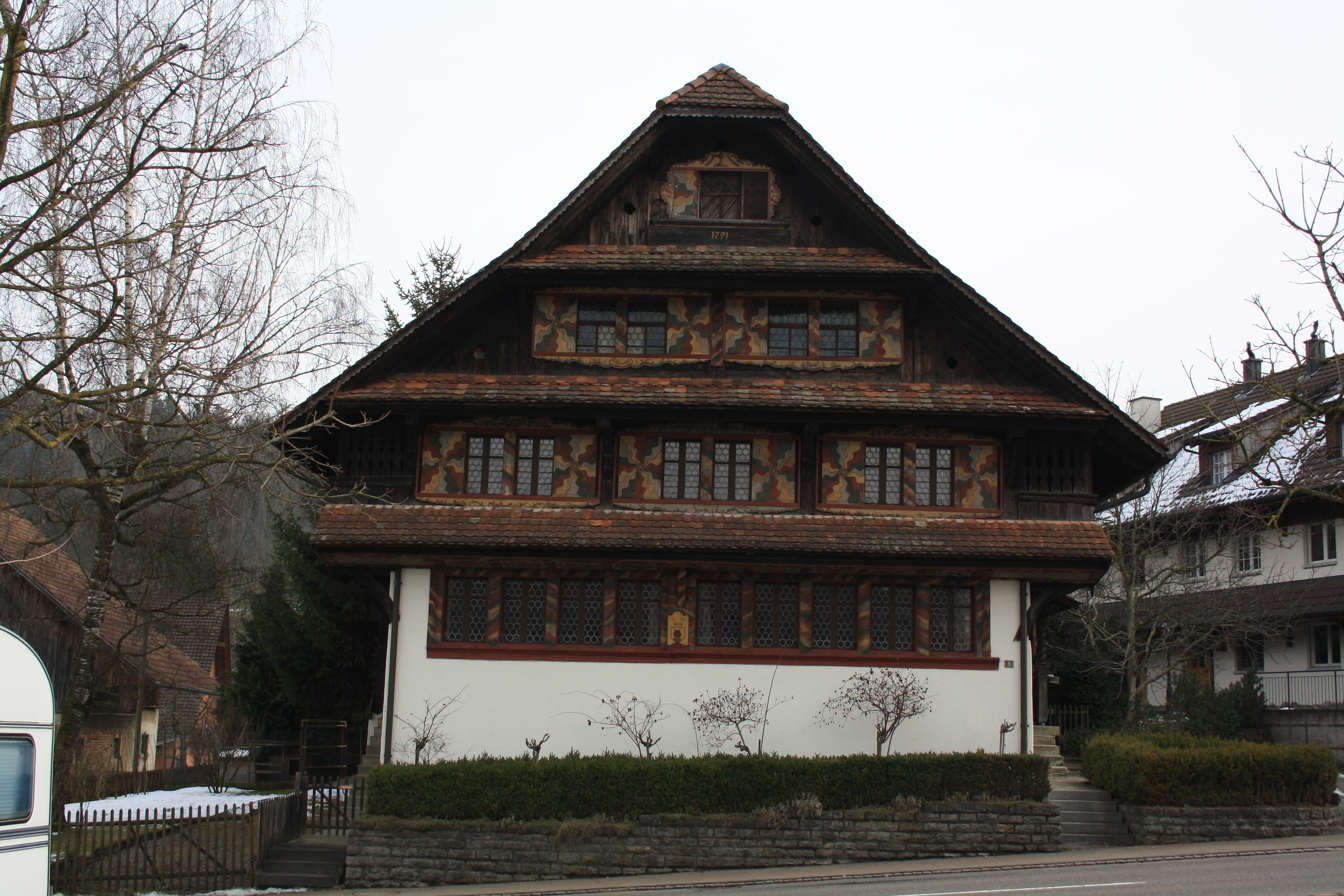
Kochhaus

The Kochhaus (Koch house) at Sarmenstorferstrasse 9 is listed as a Swiss heritage site of national significance.

== Economy ==
As of 2007, Büttikon had an unemployment rate of 2.38%. As of 2005, there were 22 people employed in the primary economic sector and about 8 businesses involved in this sector. 63 people are employed in the secondary sector and there are 7 businesses in this sector. 87 people are employed in the tertiary sector, with 19 businesses in this sector.

As of 2000 there was a total of 368 workers who lived in the municipality. Of these, 291 or about 79.1% of the residents worked outside Büttikon while 89 people commuted into the municipality for work. There were a total of 166 jobs (of at least 6 hours per week) in the municipality. Of the working population, 11.4% used public transportation to get to work, and 57.7% used a private car.

== Religion ==
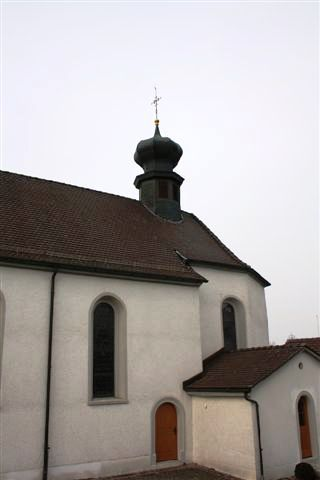
Chapel in Büttikon

From the 2000 census, 384 or 58.5% were Roman Catholic, while 160 or 24.4% belonged to the Swiss Reformed Church. Of the rest of the population, there was 1 individual who belonged to the Christian Catholic faith.
