= Uezwil =

- Municipality
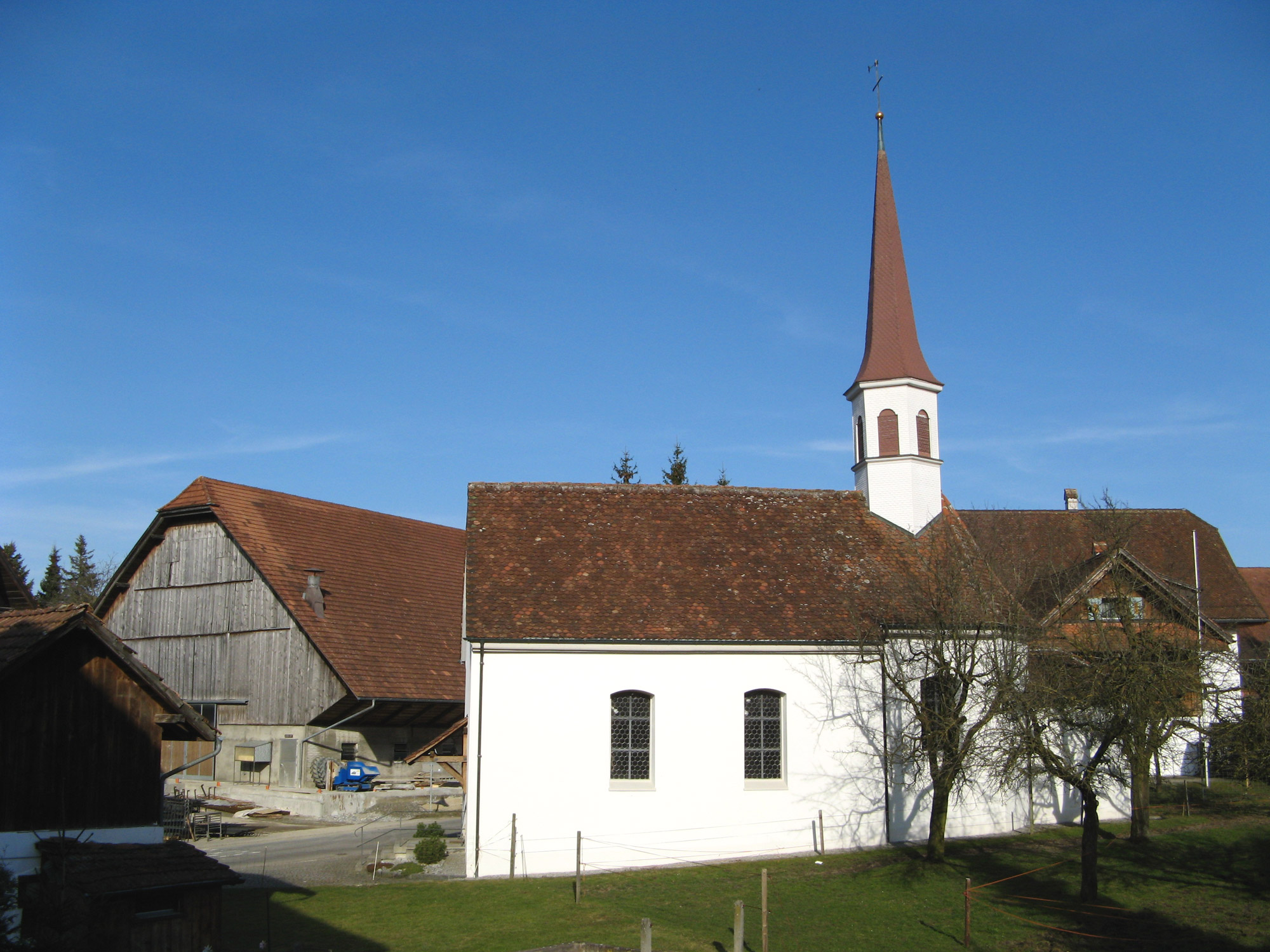

- Flag Coat of arms
- Location of Uezwil
- Location within Switzerland Location within Canton of Aargau
- Coordinates: 47°19′N 8°17′E
- Country: Switzerland
- Canton: Aargau
- District: Bremgarten

Government
  - Mayor: Peter Koch

Area
  - Total: 2.45 km^{2} (0.95 sq mi)
- Elevation: 532 m (1,745 ft)

Population (December 2020)
  - Total: 504
  - Density: 206/km^{2} (533/sq mi)
- Time zone: UTC+01:00 (CET)
  - Summer (DST): UTC+02:00 (CEST)
- Postal code: 5619
- SFOS number: 4078
- ISO 3166 code: CH-AG
- Surrounded by: Büttikon, Waltenschwil, Kallern, Sarmenstorf
- Website: uezwil.ch

Uezwil is a municipality in the district of Bremgarten in the canton of Aargau in Switzerland.

== History ==
In 1936, a 4,500-year-old megalith dating from the Neolithic Age was discovered. Roman finds point to human habitation in the area during the classical period. Around 500, a settlement of Alamanni developed in the area. A village of this name was first documented in 1306 in a Habsburg land deed.

== Geography ==
Uezwil has an area, as of 2006, of 2.4 square kilometers (0.93 sq mi). Of this area, 65.8% is used for agricultural purposes, while 28.4% is forested. The rest of the land, (5.8%) is settled.

== Coat of arms ==
The blazon of the municipal coat of arms is Per pale Or three Arrows Gules in pale fesswise issuant and Azure.

== Demographics ==
Uezwil has a population (as of 31 December 2020) of 504. As of 2008, 8.4% of the population was made up of foreign nationals. Over the last 10 years (1997–2007) the population has changed at a rate of 13.9%. Most of the population (as of 2000) speaks German (97.5%), with English being second most common ( 0.8%) and French being third ( 0.6%).

The age distribution, as of 2008, in Uezwil is; 51 children or 12.4% of the population are between 0 and 9 years old and 48 teenagers or 11.7% are between 10 and 19. Of the adult population, 41 people or 10.0% of the population are between 20 and 29 years old. 58 people or 14.1% are between 30 and 39, 85 people or 20.6% are between 40 and 49, and 56 people or 13.6% are between 50 and 59. The senior population distribution is 45 people or 10.9% of the population are between 60 and 69 years old, 21 people or 5.1% are between 70 and 79, there are 6 people or 1.5% who are between 80 and 89, and there is 1 person who is 90 and older.

As of 2000, there were 7 homes with 1 or 2 persons in the household, 39 homes with 3 or 4 persons in the household, and 78 homes with 5 or more persons in the household. The average number of people per household was 2.72 individuals. In 2008 there were 105 single family homes (or 64.8% of the total) out of a total of 162 homes and apartments. There were a total of 0 empty apartments for a 0.0% vacancy rate. As of 2007, the construction rate of new housing units was 7.9 new units per 1000 residents.

In the 2007 federal election the most popular party was the SVP which received 48.8% of the vote. The next three most popular parties were the SP (13.1%), the CVP (13%) and the FDP (9%).

In Uezwil about 78% of the population (between age 25-64) have completed either non-mandatory upper secondary education or additional higher education (either university or a Fachhochschule). Of the school age population (in the 2008/2009 school year), there are 28 students attending primary school in the municipality.

The historical population is given in the following table:

Historical population
Year	Pop.	±%
1975	300	—
1980	293	−2.3%
1990	335	+14.3%
2000	364	+8.7%

== Economy ==
As of 2007, Uezwil had an unemployment rate of 1.13%. As of 2005, there were 58 people employed in the primary economic sector and about 16 businesses involved in this sector. 6 people are employed in the secondary sector and there are 3 businesses in this sector. 11 people are employed in the tertiary sector, with 6 businesses in this sector.

As of 2000 there was a total of 199 workers who lived in the municipality. Of these, 156 or about 78.4% of the residents worked outside Uezwil while 13 people commuted into the municipality for work. There were a total of 56 jobs (of at least 6 hours per week) in the municipality. Of the working population, 3.9% used public transportation to get to work, and 60.7% used a private car.

== Religion ==
From the 2000 census, 233 or 64.5% were Roman Catholic, while 77 or 21.3% belonged to the Swiss Reformed Church. Of the rest of the population, there was 1 individual who belonged to the Christian Catholic faith.
