= Hilfikon =

- Former municipality
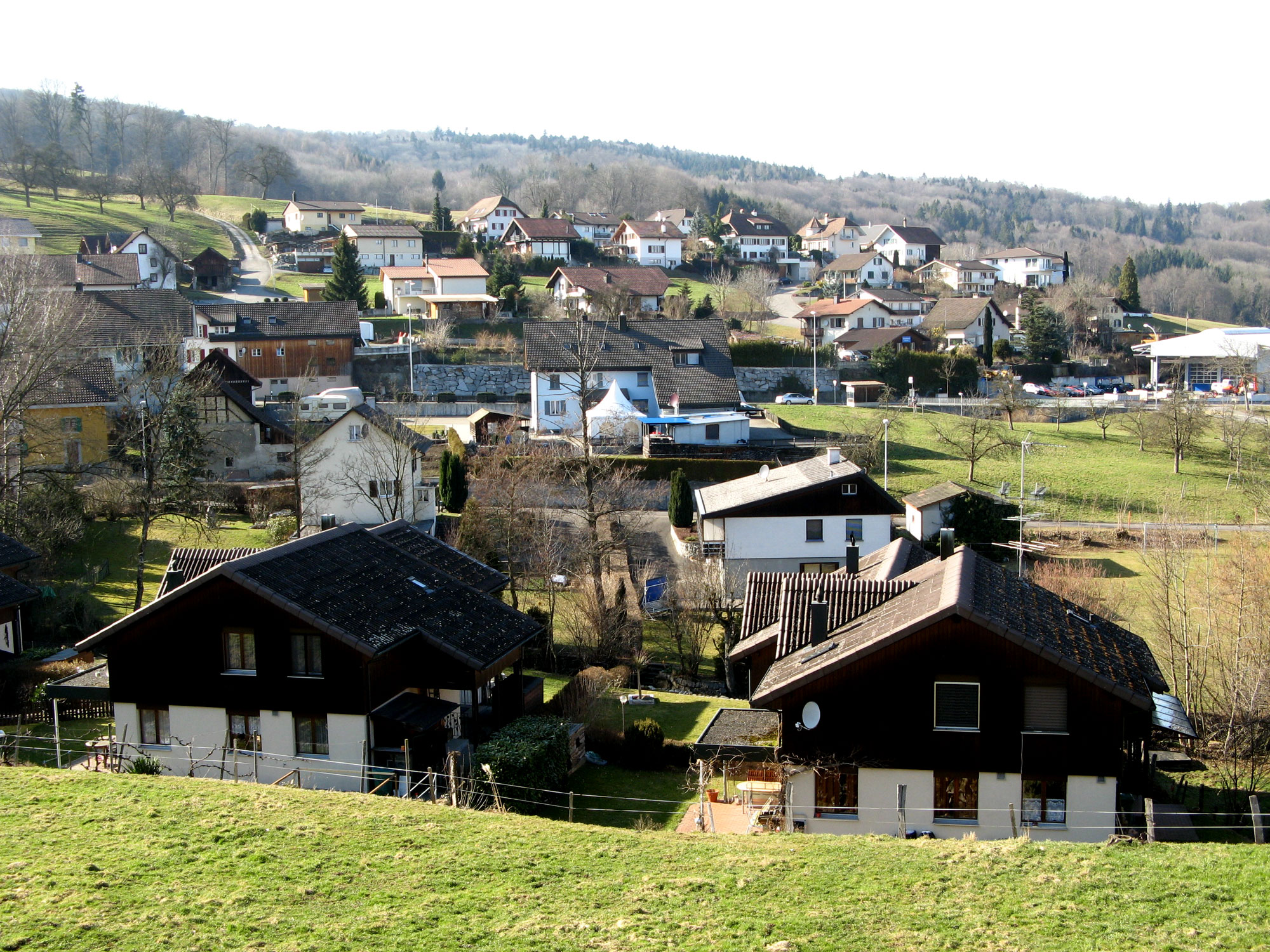

- Flag Coat of arms
- Location of Hilfikon
- Location within Switzerland Location within Canton of Aargau
- Coordinates: 47°20′N 8°15′E
- Country: Switzerland
- Canton: Aargau
- District: Bremgarten

Area
  - Total: 1.72 km^{2} (0.66 sq mi)
- Elevation: 479 m (1,572 ft)

Population (December 2020)
  - Total: 259
  - Density: 151/km^{2} (390/sq mi)
- Time zone: UTC+01:00 (CET)
  - Summer (DST): UTC+02:00 (CEST)
- Postal code: 5613
- SFOS number: 4070
- ISO 3166 code: CH-AG
- Surrounded by: Büttikon, Sarmenstorf, Seengen, Villmergen
- Website: www.hilfikon.ch

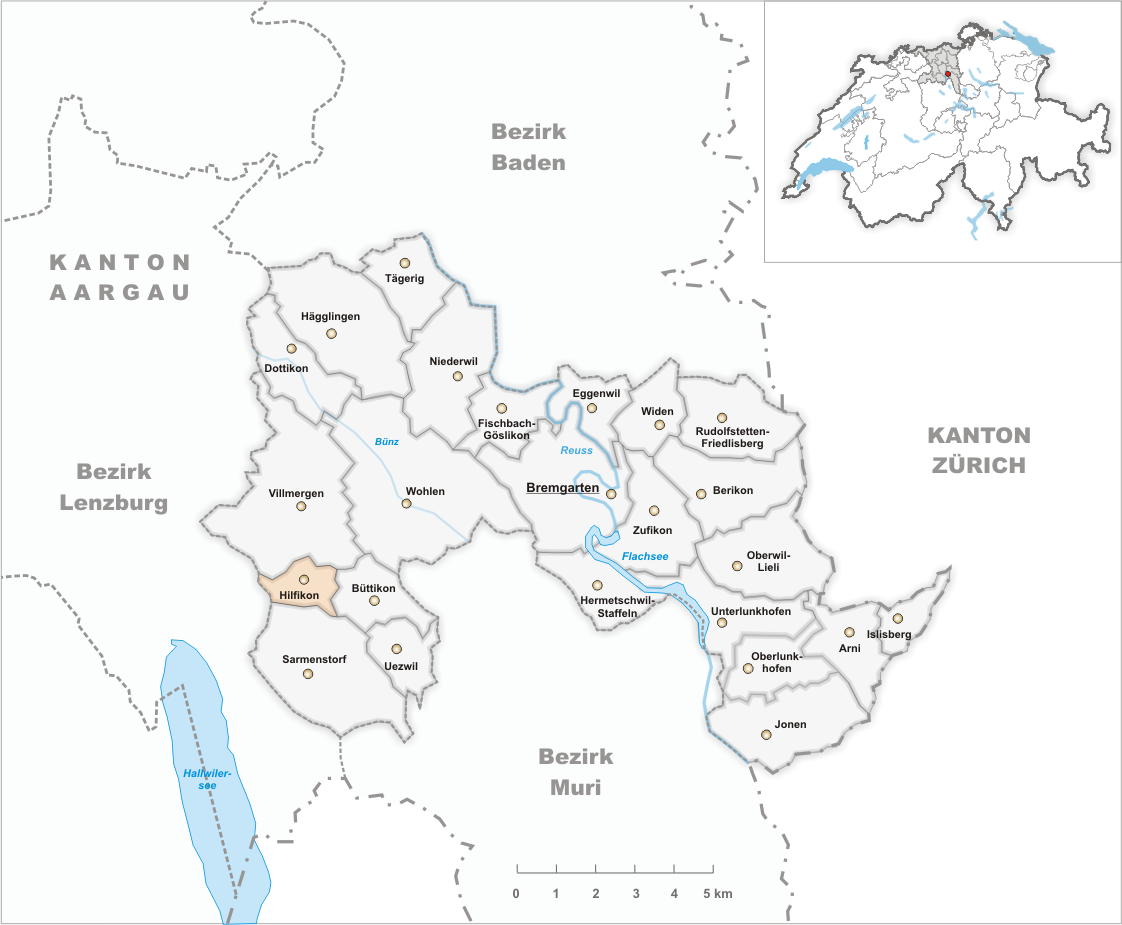
Hilfikon before the merger into Villmergen

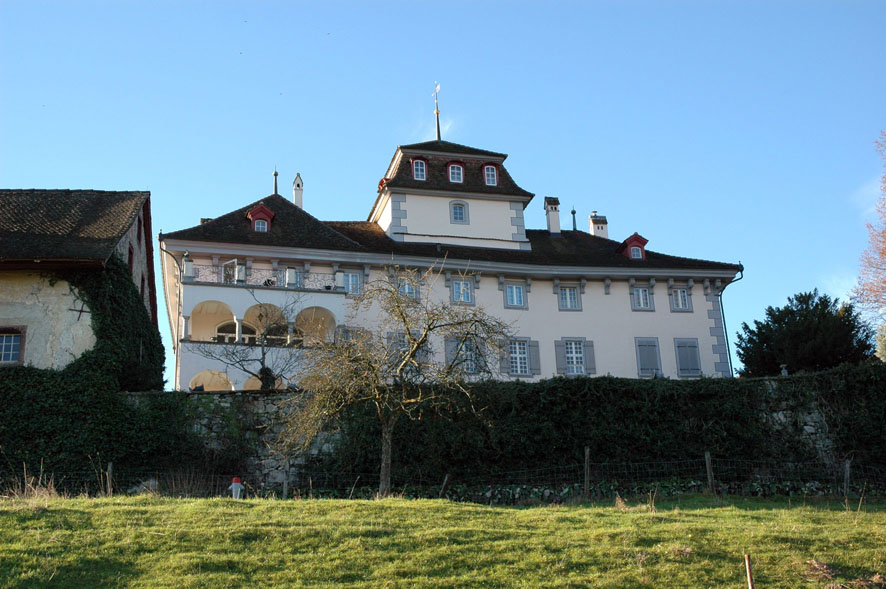
Castle of Hilfikon

Hilfikon is a village in the district of Bremgarten in the canton of Aargau in Switzerland. In January 2010 Hilfikon merged with the neighbour village of Villmergen.

== History of the village ==
Hilfikon was first mentioned in 924 as Hilfiniswilare, in1250 as Hilfinchon. Other variants of the name e.g. Hilffickonn can found in many old documents. In 1290 Markwart and Arnold von Hilfikon, ministerials of the Habsburgians, built a tower house in Hilfikon and ruled the village.

Lucerne conquered Hilfikon and the nearby villages of Büttikon, Sarmenstorf, Uezwil and Villmergen in 1415, but returned them in 1425 to the joint rule of the Swiss Confederates. Hilfikon thereafter belonged to the Villmergen district in the Freie Ämter, a common subject territory.

Part of the First Battle of Villmergen (1656) took place on Hilfikon territory and caused hundreds of deaths. Before the Second Battle of Villmergen (1712), the castle served as headquarters for Catholic troops. A later peace settlement granted rule in the lower Freie Ämter, including Hilfikon, exclusively to the Reformed cantons of Bern, Zurich and Glarus. After the French invasion of 1798 and the creation of the Helvetic Republic, Hilfikon and Büttikon formed an administrative unit in the short-lived Canton of Baden. When the Canton Aargau was founded in 1803, Hilfikon became autonomous again.

In the 19th century the Canton Aargau refurbished the main road through the village. Residents lived mainly from agriculture, crafts, and home-based straw weaving. A water reservoir was built in 1904 and electricity arrived in 1905. The Wohlen–Meisterschwanden railway, opened in 1916 with a stop at Hilfikon, connected the village to the Swiss train network. The railway was closed in 1997 and public transport was picked-up by a public bus service.

Population growth remained modest, preserving Hilfikon’s rural character. After local approval votes in 2007, Hilfikon merged with Villmergen on 1 January 2010 and ceased to exist as an independent municipality.

Ecclesiastically, Hilfikon always belonged to Villmergen parish. A castle chapel built in 1510 was used for local services; the municipality bought it in 1832 and transferred it to a private chapel association in 1947. In 1750 Franz Viktor Augustin von Roll took the old chapel down, replacing it with the present elongated chapel built by master mason Johann Marti. The new chapel's choir houses a replica of the Church of the Holy Sepulchre. The chapel has a gabled roof, a polygonal choir, and stands at the western corner of the castle above a steep slope. A six-sided roof turret with a pointed spire rises above the choir ridge. A square sacristy with a lean-to roof is attached on the southeast side where the nave meets the choir. The interior is in Rococo style. Wall and ceiling paintings by Franz Anton Rebsamen were whitewashed in 1901, then partly uncovered during restorations in 1954–55 and 1959–60. The altar features an elaborately carved tabernacle and a life-size Crucifixion by Johann Baptist Babel. A wooden Louis XVI–style pulpit was added around 1800 in front of the choir arch. The restored frescoes and the full-scale replica of the Holy Sepulchre of Jerusalem are considered important cultural treasures.

== History of the castle of Hilfikon ==
The castle of Hilfikon was built on the premises of the tower house of Markwaldus and Arnoldus de Hilfikon. Little is known about the ownership between 1290 and 1472, the first mention and when it was owned by Bertold VII Schwend of Zurich respectively. In 1498 it became a fief of Hans von Seengen, and in 1506–10 it was owned by Melchior von Gilgen of Lucerne. He also purchased the Bailiwick of Sarmenstorf in 1514, and in 1510 donated a chapel. In 1628 the property was purchased by John Lussi Landamman for Unterwalden, then in 1644 it went to the Zwyer family of Evibach in Silenen. In 1743 the village transferred by marriage to the Tschudi family of Glarus, which were deposed in 1749 by Augustin Victor Franz Roll from Solothurn and remained in the family's possession for almost 100 years.

Hilfikon was the place where two of the decisive Swiss confessional battles took place, a first war in 1516 (1.Villmergerkrieg) and a second in 1712 (2. Villmergerkrieg or Toggenburg War). The castle itself did not play a role in battles but in the politics that came along with the wars. In 1832 the castle was sold along with other properties and has had several owners until Ludwig Michalski von Krakau purchased it and moved in with his family. After his death, the castle was sold 1907 to Major Hermann Nabholz von Grabow (*1869; †1955) who built the first private Swiss airfield in 1923 in Hilfikon. The airfield was used by the Swiss airforce from 1925 onward. Economically, it proved unsustainable; the runway was ploughed up during World War II and the hangar removed in 1948. In 1944–45 the castle housed over three dozen mostly Eastern European refugee women in a vocational school program.

== Geography ==
Aerial view by Walter Mittelholzer (1925)

Hilfikon has an area, as of 2006, of 1.7 square kilometers (0.66 sq mi). Of this area, 63.6% is used for agricultural purposes, while 25.4% is forested. Of the rest of the land, 10.4% is settled (buildings or roads) and the remainder (0.6%) is non-productive (rivers or lakes).

The village is located in the Bremgarten district along the old Villmergen-Sarmenstorf road on the northern edge of the Lindenberg.

== Coat of arms ==
The blazon of the municipal coat of arms is Argent an Elephant Sable defendu and harnessed Or carrying a Tower embattled Gules doored and windowed of the second.The use of an elefant is unique among Swiss coat of arms and dates back to 1530 at least. In medieval times, Canting arms were based on the bearers name. Hilfini or helfo as well as helfant were terms used for elefant and it is thus likely that the elefant was used to denote the knights of Hilfikon.

== Demographics ==
Hilfikon has a population (as of 31 December 2020) of 259. As of 2008, 9.9% of the population was made up of foreign nationals. Over the last 10 years the population has decreased at a rate of −2.4%. Most of the population (as of 2000) speaks German (95.1%), with French being second most common ( 3.1%) and Italian being third ( 0.9%).

The age distribution, as of 2008, in Hilfikon is; 24 children or 9.6% of the population are between 0 and 9 years old and 32 teenagers or 12.7% are between 10 and 19. Of the adult population, 29 people or 11.6% of the population are between 20 and 29 years old. 29 people or 11.6% are between 30 and 39, 56 people or 22.3% are between 40 and 49, and 42 people or 16.7% are between 50 and 59. The senior population distribution is 9 people or 3.6% of the population are between 60 and 69 years old, 15 people or 6.0% are between 70 and 79, there are 12 people or 4.8% who are between 80 and 89, and there are 3 people or 1.2% who are 90 and older.

As of 2000, the average number of residents per living room was 0.57 which is about equal to the cantonal average of 0.57 per room. In this case, a room is defined as space of a housing unit of at least 4 m^{2} (43 sq ft) as normal bedrooms, dining rooms, living rooms, kitchens and habitable cellars and attics. About 73.1% of the total households were owner occupied, or in other words did not pay rent (though they may have a mortgage or a rent-to-own agreement). As of 2000, there were 3 homes with 1 or 2 persons in the household, 29 homes with 3 or 4 persons in the household, and 46 homes with 5 or more persons in the household. The average number of people per household was 2.73 individuals. In 2008 there were 63 single family homes (or 62.4% of the total) out of a total of 101 homes and apartments. There were a total of 1 empty apartments for a 1.0% vacancy rate. As of 2007, the construction rate of new housing units was 4.1 new units per 1000 residents.

In the 2007 federal election, the most popular party was the SVP which received 41% of the vote. The next three most popular parties were the CVP (19.7%), the FDP (14%) and the SP (13.1%).

The entire Swiss population is generally well educated. In Hilfikon about 83.8% of the population (between age 25-64) have completed either non-mandatory upper secondary education or additional higher education (either University or a Fachhochschule). Of the school age population (in the 2008/2009 school year), there are 13 students attending primary school in the municipality.

The historical population is given in the following table:

year	population
1743	125
1798	119
1850	159
1870	205
1900	179
1950	172
2000	224

== Heritage sites of national significance ==
Schloss Hilfikon and chapel are listed as a Swiss heritage site of national significance.

== Economy ==
As of 2007, Hilfikon had an unemployment rate of 1.89%. As of 2005, there were 20 people employed in the primary economic sector and about 7 businesses involved in this sector. 4 people are employed in the secondary sector and there are 3 businesses in this sector. 18 people are employed in the tertiary sector, with 9 businesses in this sector.

As of 2000, there were 114 total workers who lived in the municipality. Of these, 84 or about 73.7% of the residents worked outside Hilfikon while 19 people commuted into the municipality for work. There were a total of 49 jobs (of at least 6 hours per week) in the municipality. Of the working population, 8.5% used public transportation to get to work, and 51.7% used a private car.

== Religion ==
From the 2000 census, 143 or 63.8% were Roman Catholic, while 62 or 27.7% belonged to the Swiss Reformed Church.
