= Sarmenstorf =

- Municipality
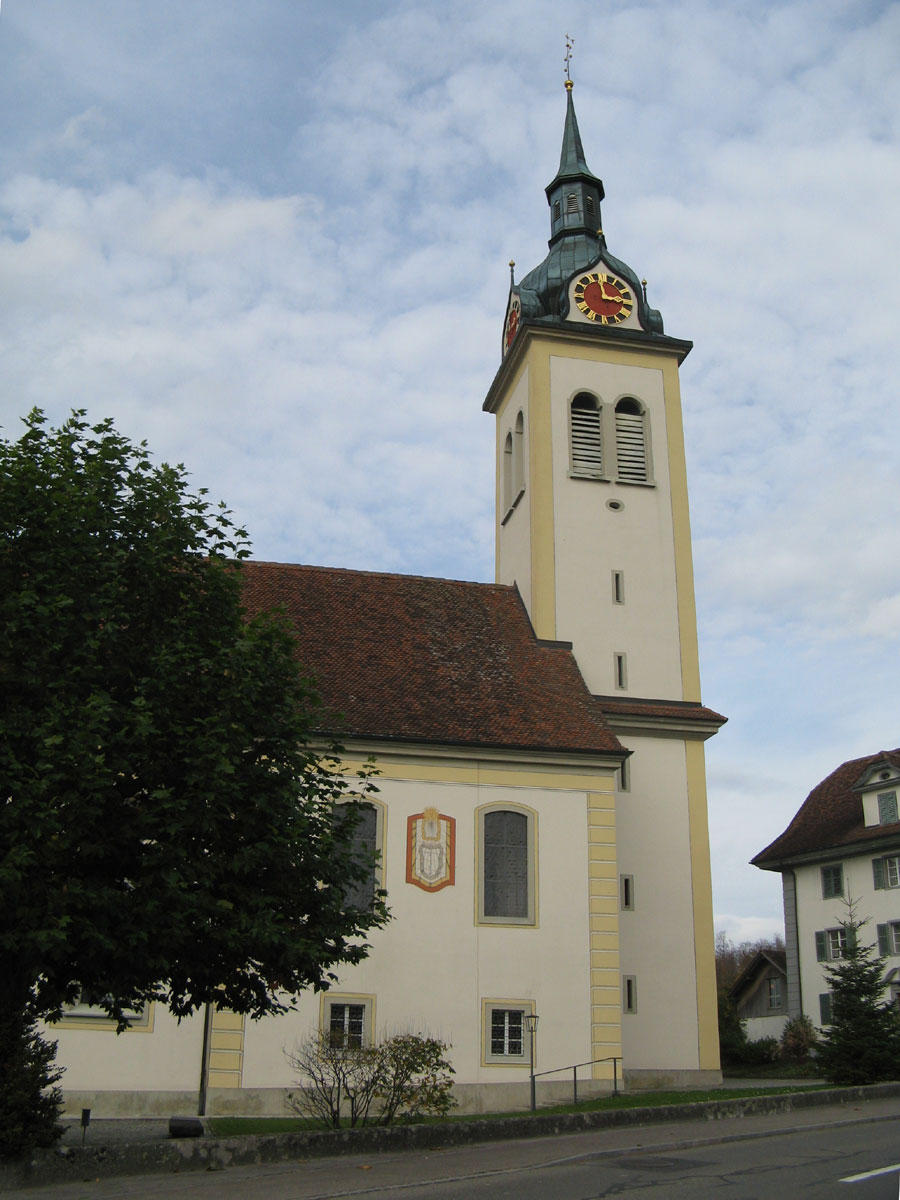

- Flag Coat of arms
- Location of Sarmenstorf
- Location within Switzerland Location within Canton of Aargau
- Coordinates: 47°19′N 8°15′E
- Country: Switzerland
- Canton: Aargau
- District: Bremgarten

Area
  - Total: 8.30 km^{2} (3.20 sq mi)
- Elevation: 534 m (1,752 ft)

Population (December 2020)
  - Total: 2,913
  - Density: 351/km^{2} (909/sq mi)
- Time zone: UTC+01:00 (CET)
  - Summer (DST): UTC+02:00 (CEST)
- Postal code: 5614
- SFOS number: 4076
- ISO 3166 code: CH-AG
- Surrounded by: Bettwil, Büttikon, Fahrwangen, Hilfikon, Kallern, Meisterschwanden, Seengen, Uezwil
- Website: sarmenstorf.ch

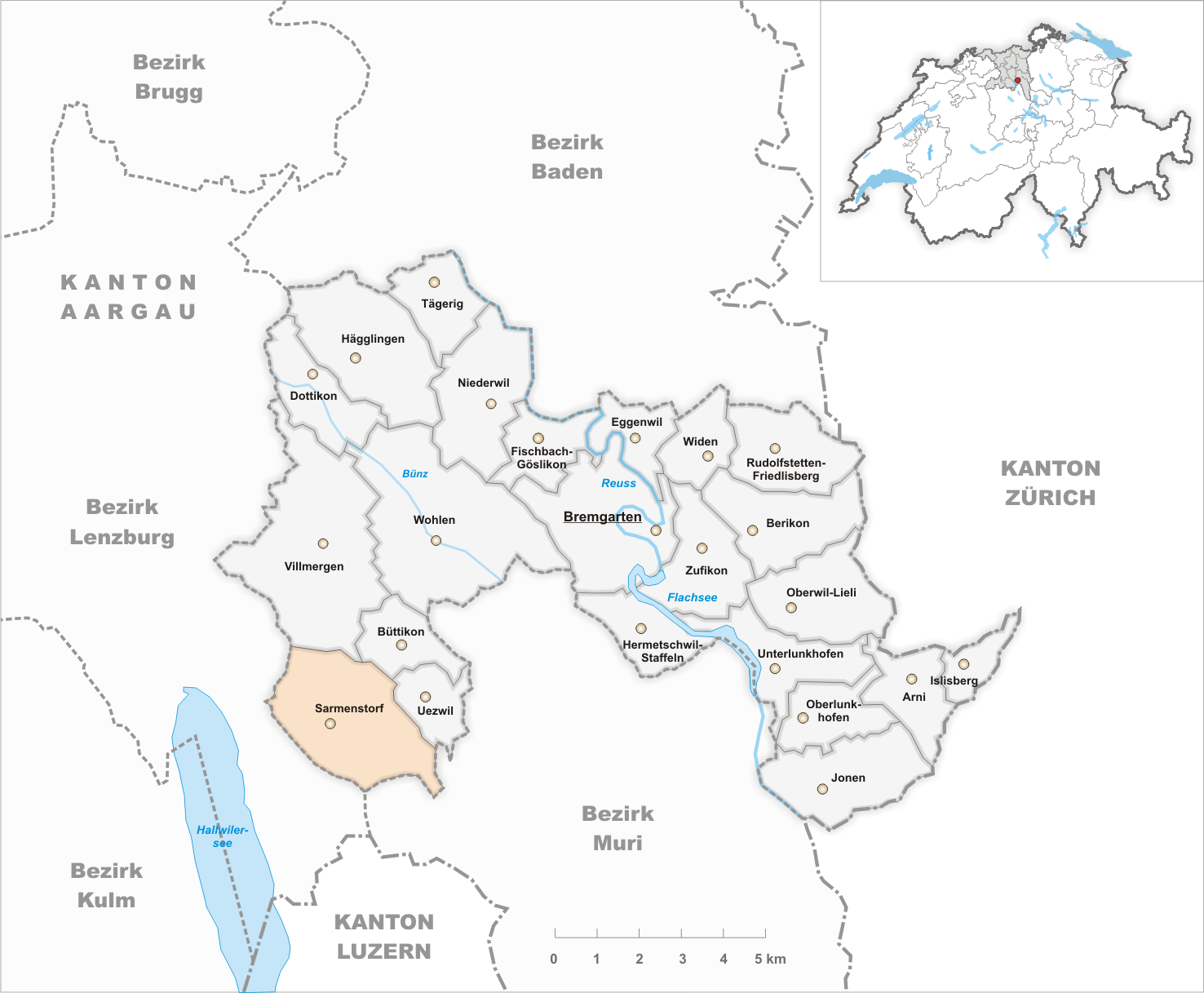
Sarmenstorf

Sarmenstorf is a municipality in the district of Bremgarten in the canton of Aargau in Switzerland.

== History ==
Aerial view (1959)

The earliest settlement in the municipality built the Neolithic burial mound at Zigiholz. The next known settlement was a Roman era villa with a portico and bath house from the 1st Century AD. villa with corner projections and bathing from the late 1st Century AD at Murimooshau. From around the same time, there is an Alemanni cemetery near the villa.

Sarmenstorf is first mentioned in 1173 as Sarmarsdorf. During the Middle Ages, Einsiedeln Abbey, St. Blaisen Abbey, Säckingen Abbey, Wettingen Abbey, Frauenthal Abbey, Gnadental Abbey and Königsfelden Abbey all owned property in Sarmenstorf. The rights to high justice were held by the House of Habsburg after 1306. Those rights went to Lucerne in 1415 and in 1425 to the Confederation. The bailiwick in der Gassen (which included Sarmenstorf) was held by the Freiherren of Küssnacht, Eschenz and Hermetschwil Abbey until 1514, when it transferred to Melchior zur Gilgen.

The parish is first mentioned in 1185. The oldest church on the site of the current Holy Cross church dates from the Carolingian era. A church was built in 1622 and was replaced by a 1778-85 late Baroque church. The church was renovated on the outside in 1982-83 and the interior was done in 1987-88. The Chapel of St. Wendelin was ordained 1659, but was a pilgrimage site even before construction began. A new chapel was built in 1746-47.

Under the short-lived Canton of Baden (1798–1803), Sarmenstorf was a district capital.

== Geography ==
Sarmenstorf has an area, as of 2006, of 8.3 square kilometers (3.2 sq mi). Of this area, 59.6% is used for agricultural purposes, while 28.7% is forested. Of the rest of the land, 11.5% is settled (buildings or roads) and the remainder (0.2%) is non-productive (rivers or lakes).

The municipality is located in the Bremgarten district on edge of the Lindenberg. It consists of the haufendorf village (an irregular, unplanned and quite closely packed village, built around a central square) of Sarmenstorf.

== Coat of arms ==
The blazon of the municipal coat of arms is Gules two Pilgrim Stocks Or in saltire.

== Demographics ==
Sarmenstorf has a population (as of 31 December 2020) of 2,913. As of 2008, 10.4% of the population was made up of foreign nationals. Over the last 10 years (1997–2007), the population has changed at a rate of 14.1%. Most of the population (as of 2000) speaks German (93.8%), with Italian being second most common ( 2.2%) and Spanish being third ( 0.7%).

The age distribution, as of 2008, in Sarmenstorf is; 269 children or 11.4% of the population are between 0 and 9 years old and 331 teenagers or 14.0% are between 10 and 19. Of the adult population, 275 people or 11.7% of the population are between 20 and 29 years old. 290 people or 12.3% are between 30 and 39, 470 people or 19.9% are between 40 and 49, and 300 people or 12.7% are between 50 and 59. The senior population distribution is 214 people or 9.1% of the population are between 60 and 69 years old, 136 people or 5.8% are between 70 and 79, there are 59 people or 2.5% who are between 80 and 89, and there are 12 people or 0.5% who are 90 and older.

As of 2000, there were 73 homes with 1 or 2 persons in the household, 265 homes with 3 or 4 persons in the household, and 421 homes with 5 or more persons in the household. The average number of people per household was 2.61 individuals. In 2008, there were 503 single family homes (or 53.4% of the total) out of a total of 942 homes and apartments. There were a total of 1 empty apartments for a 0.1% vacancy rate. As of 2007, the construction rate of new housing units was 7 new units per 1000 residents.

In the 2007 federal election, the most popular party was the SVP which received 35.5% of the vote. The next three most popular parties were the CVP (19.5%), the FDP (16.9%) and the SP (12%).

In Sarmenstorf, about 73.4% of the population (between age 25-64) have completed either non-mandatory upper secondary education or additional higher education (either university or a Fachhochschule). Of the school age population (in the 2008/2009 school year), there are 208 students attending primary school, there are 106 students attending secondary school in the municipality.

The historical population is given in the following table:

Historical population
Year	Pop.	±%
1650	450	—
1850	1,240	+175.6%
1900	1,212	−2.3%
1950	1,398	+15.3%
2000	2,146	+53.5%

== Heritage sites of national significance ==
The Zigiholz, a Neolithic tumulus, is listed as a Swiss heritage site of national significance.

== Economy ==
As of 2007, Sarmenstorf had an unemployment rate of 2.08%. As of 2005, there were 63 people employed in the primary economic sector and about 21 businesses involved in this sector. 210 people are employed in the secondary sector and there are 24 businesses in this sector. 336 people are employed in the tertiary sector, with 59 businesses in this sector.

As of 2000 there were 1,133 total workers who lived in the municipality. Of these, 848 or about 74.8% of the residents worked outside Sarmenstorf while 248 people commuted into the municipality for work. There were a total of 533 jobs (of at least 6 hours per week) in the municipality. Of the working population, 8.1% used public transportation to get to work, and 59% used a private car.

== Religion ==
From the 2000 census, 1,393 or 64.9% were Roman Catholic, while 428 or 19.9% belonged to the Swiss Reformed Church. Of the rest of the population, there were 2 individuals (or about 0.09% of the population) who belonged to the Christian Catholic faith.
