= Robert Schiess =

Swiss painter (1896–1956)

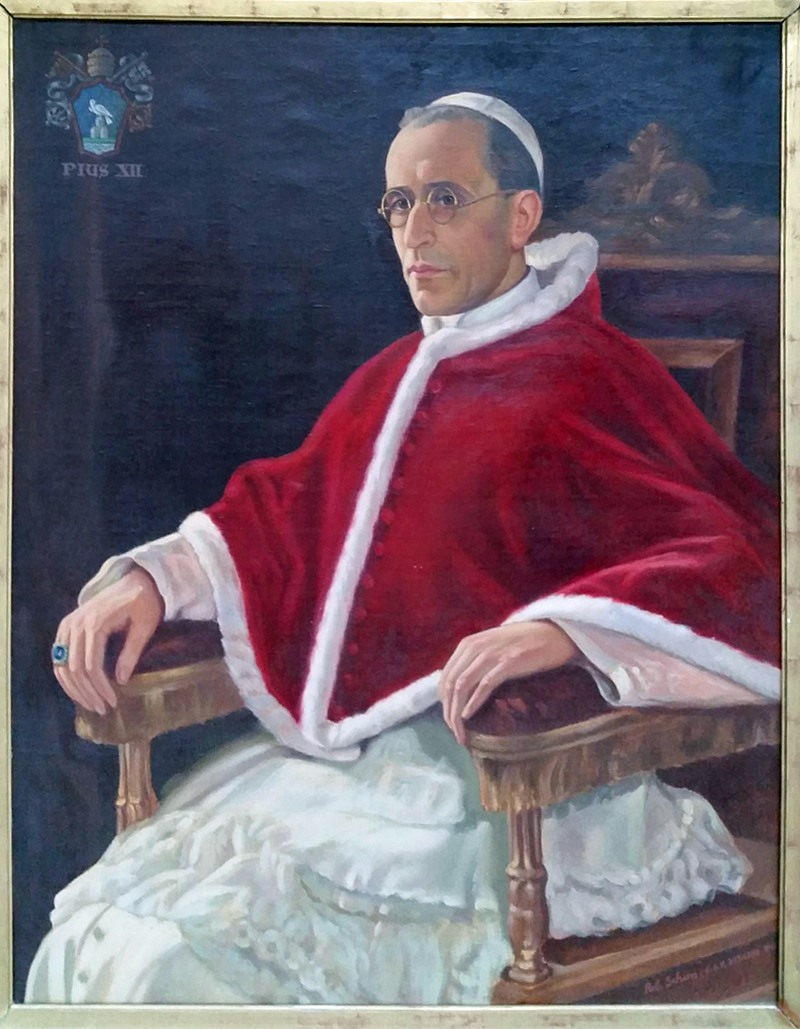
Robert Schiess

Robert Schiess (1896–1956) was a Swiss painter and member of the Pontifical Swiss Guard.

== Life ==
Robert Schiess was born in 1896 in Cham, Switzerland. After learning to paint in Altdorf, Uri, Schiess worked in Lucerne and in 1920 took a study trip to Italy to further refine his artistry. In 1923, Schiess began serving with the Pontifical Swiss Guard at Vatican City and continued his education here until 1927. During his time in Italy, Schiess was introduced to famous painter Philip de László, and in 1928 the two artists travelled throughout the world to destinations including Africa, America, Spain and France.

In 1933, Schiess returned to Italy and again began to serve with the Swiss Guard, a position in which he remained until 1951. During his time serving as a Swiss Guard, Schiess impressed many with his artistic talents, including the pontiff who had him design and paint new frescoes for the church of St. Martin and St. Sebastian which was built for the Swiss Guards in 1568. As well as work for the Vatican, he created pictures for wealthy citizens. Schiess also enjoyed recreating the works of old masters, which brought him great recognition for his skills. As a result, he was appointed by the Vatican to create portraits of all the colonels of the Swiss Guard.

From 1952 Schiess lived on the island of Ischia, where he went on to marry in 1955. Shortly after, Schiess became ill and died in 1956 at the age of 60.
