= George Page (footballer, born 1898) =

English footballer

Personal information
- Full name: George Page
- Date of birth: 30 November 1896
- Place of birth: Gateshead, County Durham, England
- Date of death: 1961 (aged 62–63)
- Place of death: Darlington
- Height: 5 ft 9 in (1.75 m)
- Position: Left back

Senior career*
Years	Team	Apps	(Gls)
–	Rise Carr		
–	Doncaster Rovers		
1921–1922	Barnsley	1	(0)
1922–1923	Ashington	31	(1)
1923–1924	Accrington Stanley	36	(2)
1924–1926	Lincoln City	64	(3)
1926–1927	Crewe Alexandra	17	(1)
1927–1928	York City	19	(0)
- * Club domestic league appearances and goals

George Page (30 November 1898 – 1961) was an English footballer who made 149 appearances in the Football League playing for Barnsley, Ashington, Accrington Stanley, Lincoln City and Crewe Alexandra. He played as a left back. He also played in the Midland League for York City.
