= George Page (Australian footballer) =

Australian rules footballer, born 1905

Personal information
- Full name: George Edward Page
- Born: 13 June 1905; Elsternwick, Victoria
- Died: 4 September 1974 (aged 69); Malvern East, Victoria

Playing career^{1}
Years	Club	Games (Goals)
1926	Essendon	1 (0)
- ^{1} Playing statistics correct to the end of 1926.

George Edward Page (13 June 1905 – 4 September 1974) was an Australian rules footballer who played with Essendon in the Victorian Football League (VFL).

== Family ==
The son of John William Page (1864–1949), and Annie Elizabeth Page (1863–1906), née Buchanan, George Edward Page was born at Elsternwick, Victoria on 13 June 1905.

He married Dorothy Thelma Wessel (1908–1983) in 1932.

== Football ==
He was granted a clearance from the Elsternwick Football Club in the Metropolitan Amateur Football Association (MAFA) to Essendon on 30 April 1926.

== Military service ==
Page later served in the Australian Army in the Middle East during World War II.

== Death ==
He died at East Malvern on 4 September 1974.
