= Hilfikon Castle =

Castle in Hilfikon, Switzerland

- Schloss Hilfikon
- Hilfikon
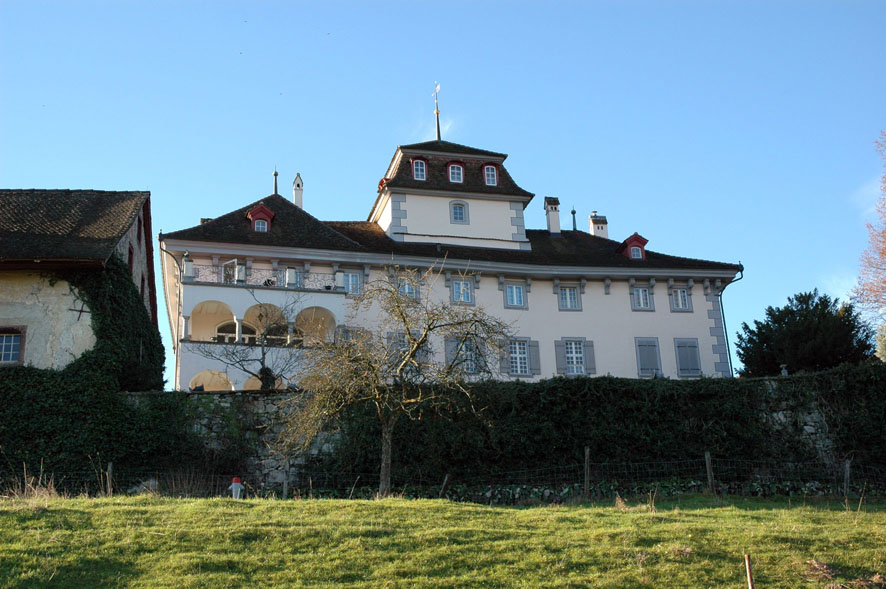
- East side of Hilfikon Castle

Site information
- Code: CH-AG
- Condition: preserved

Location
- Coordinates: 47°19′51″N 8°14′49″E
- Height: 502 m above the sea

Site history
- Built: 1290

Hilfikon Castle is a castle in the municipality of Hilfikon of the Canton of Aargau in Switzerland. It is a Swiss heritage site of national significance.

== See also ==
- List of castles in Switzerland
