= Anglo-Swiss Condensed Milk Company =

Precursor to Nestlé (1866–1905)

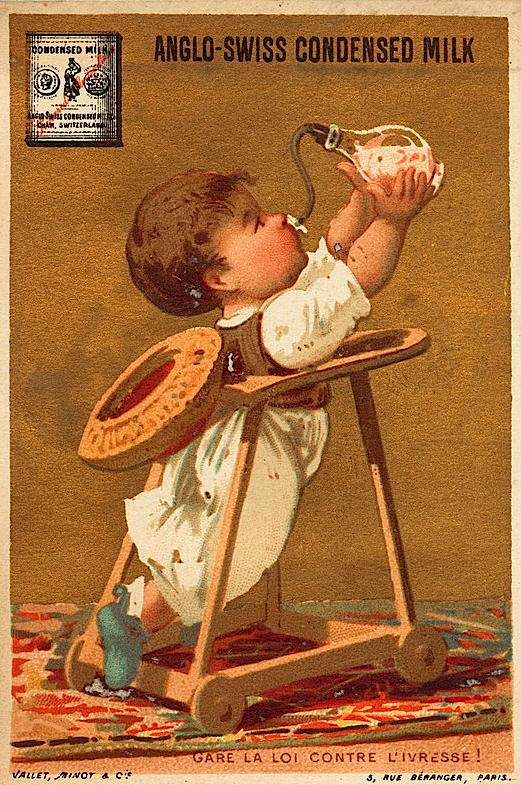
- Advertising, 1880s
- Industry: Manufacturing
- Founded: 1866; 160 years ago in Cham, Switzerland
- Founder: George Ham Page; Charles Page
- Defunct: 1905
- Fate: Merger
- Successor: Nestlé
- Headquarters: Cham, Switzerland
- Products: Evaporated milk
- Owner: Page Brothers

Anglo-Swiss Condensed Milk Company was a Swiss manufacturer of evaporated milk founded in 1866 by American brothers George Ham Page and Charles Page. During the 1870s the company steadily expanded into foreign markets which included the United Kingdom and the German Empire. In 1882, the company expanded into the United States, and built the largest factory worldwide in Dixon, Illinois, which was the hometown of the Page brothers. However, the competition was too strong and they sold the factory to Borden in 1902. After the death of George H. Page the company merged with Henri Nestlé company which ultimately became Nestlé in 1977.

== History ==
The Page brothers from Dixon, Illinois, George Ham Page (1836-1899) and Charles Page (1838-1873), initially hailed from a farming background in rural Illinois. During the American Civil War, they got into contact with the manufacturing of evaporated milk in cans. Charles was later engaged as commercial vice consul and traveled Switzerland. It's believed that he got inspired by the cows and the open plains to start a manufacturing plant targeting the European markets.

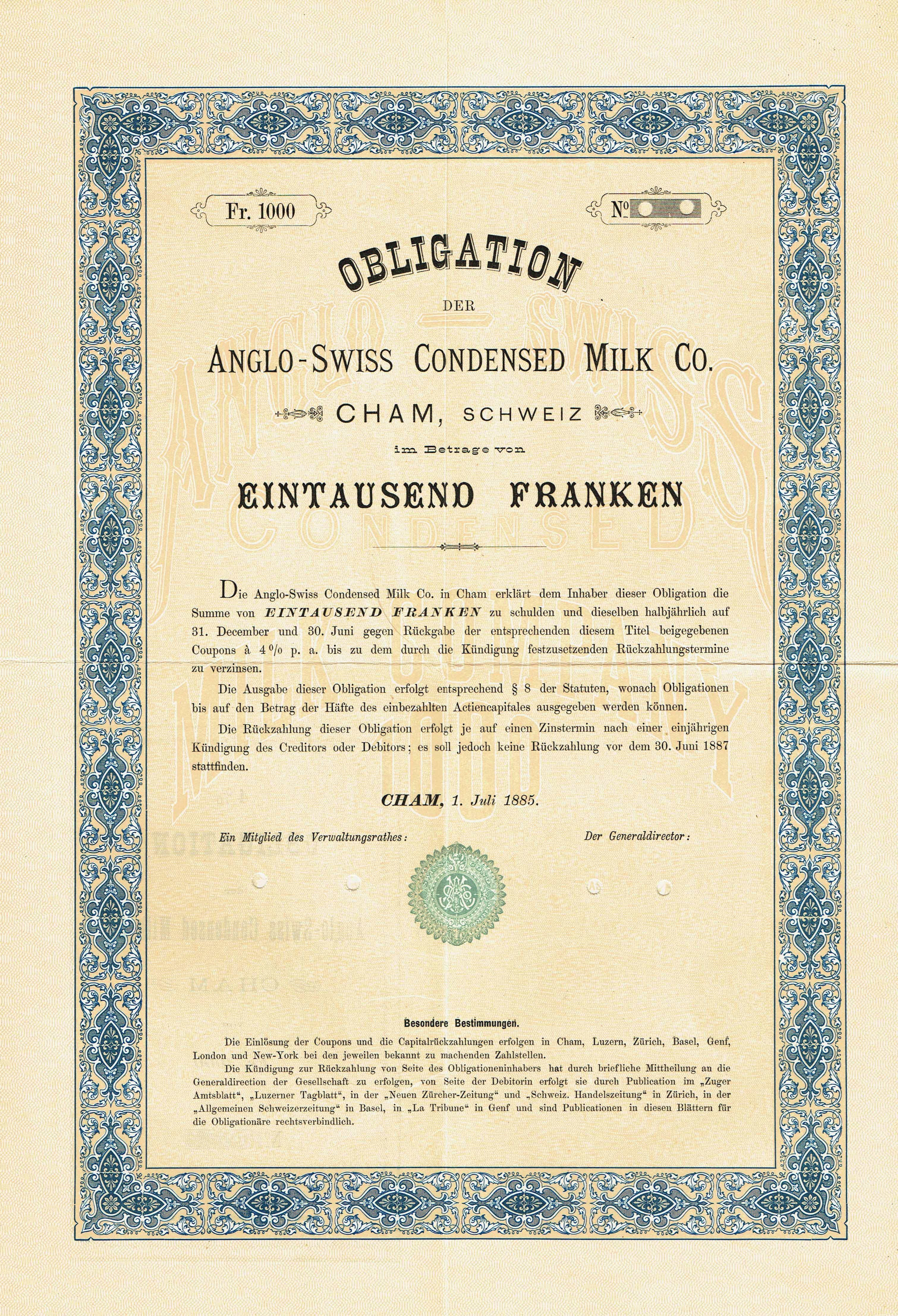
Share certificate (1885)

In 1866, he and his brother, incorporated the Anglo-Swiss Condensed Milk Co. in Cham, Switzerland, with initially 100,000 Swiss Francs in share capital. They were among the first producers of evaporated milk in Europe, which they sold under the brand "Milchmädchen" (English: Milk Girl). In order to produce they imported machinery and manufacturing methods which they took-over from Gail Borden. The success of the Anglo-Swiss attracted countless imitators in Europe: by 1872, 25 more milk condensing factories had been set up. The Anglo Swiss reacted with acquisitions and founding new factories: The factories in Düdingen and Gossau and in Middlewich and Aylesbury in England (1874) were just the beginning of a long-term strategy to eliminate competitors through acquisitions.

In addition, however, they also built their own factories in Europe, especially since the rising nationalism increasingly created protectionist barriers - around 1874 in Chippenham, England and Lindau, German Empire in order not to be able to be cut off from their target markets. From 1882, Anglo Swiss then expanded into the USA by purchasing its first factory in Middletown, New York, and around 1889 even built what was then the largest condensed milk factory in the world in the Page brothers' home town of Dixon, Illinois. Due to heavy competition, they decided to sell the American operations to Borden in 1902. After the death of George Page the way cleared for merger negotiations. In 1905, the former competitors merged to form the "Nestlé and Anglo Swiss Condensed Milk Company", which was shortened to Nestlé in 1977, now one of the world's largest food companies.

== See also ==
- Swiss cheeses and dairy products

== Literature ==
- Van Orsouw Michael, Stadlin Judith, Imboden Monika; George Page, der Milch-Pionier (in German)
