= St. Andreas Castle =

Castle in Cham, Switzerland

- Schloss St. Andreas
- Cham
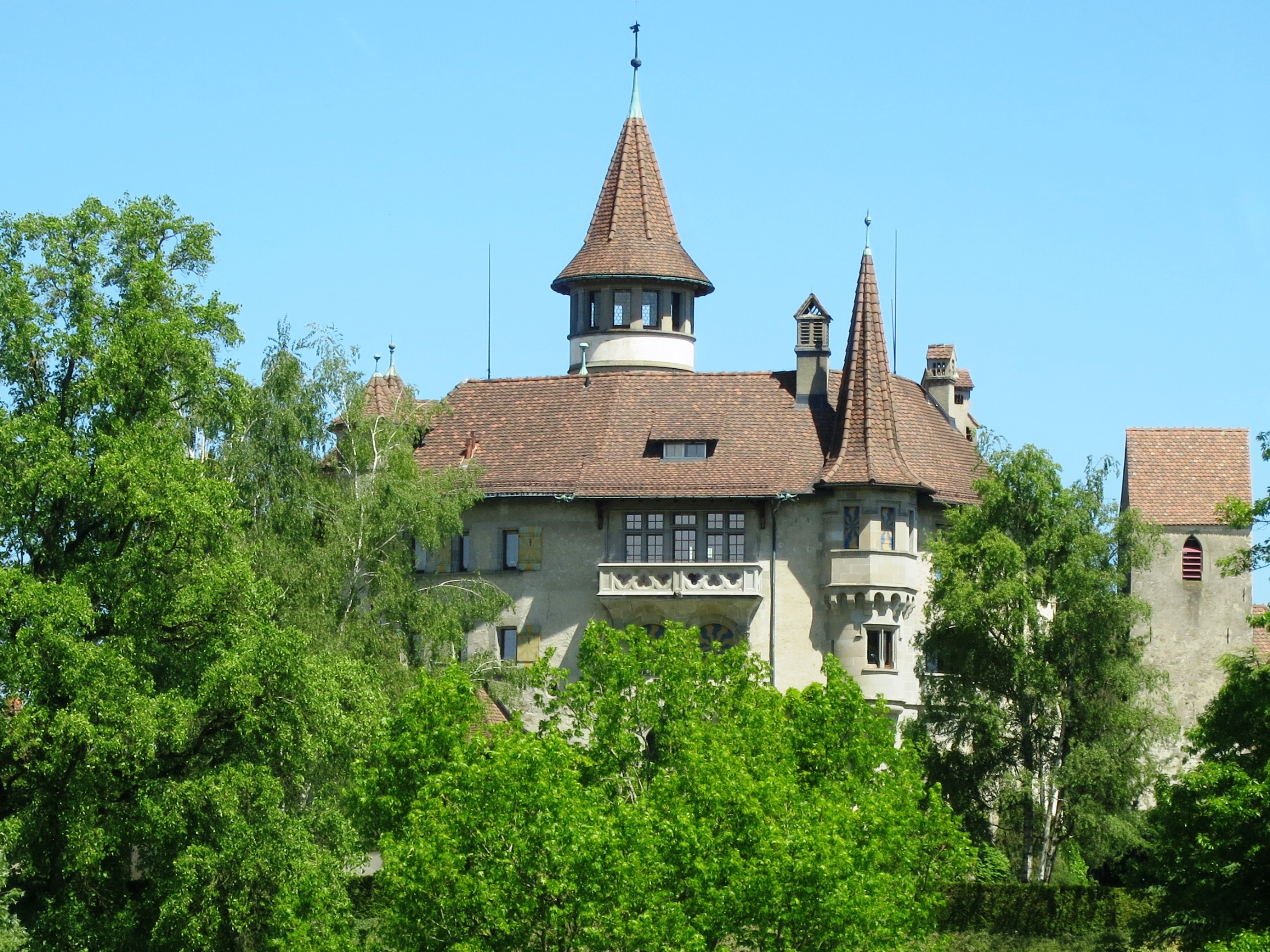
- St. Andreas Castle

Site information
- Code: CH-ZG
- Condition: preserved

Location
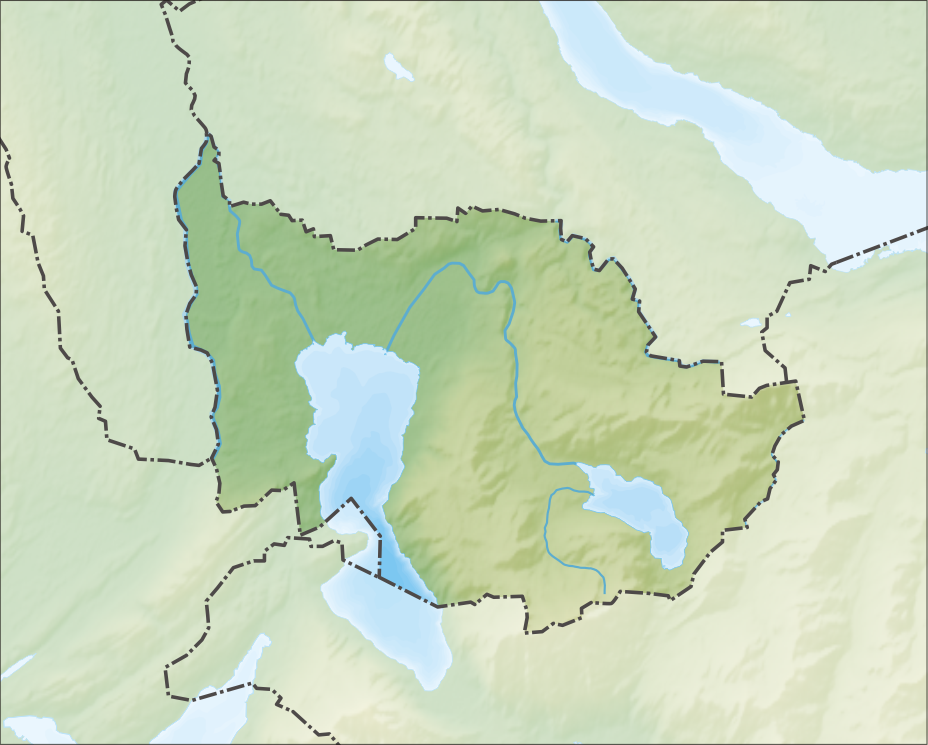
- Coordinates: 47°10′43.5″N 8°27′58.5″E
- Height: 430 m above the sea

Site history
- Built: first mentioned 858

Swiss Cultural Property of National Significance

St. Andreas Castle (German: Schloss St. Andreas) is a privately owned castle located in Cham, in the Canton of Zug, Switzerland. It is a Swiss heritage site of national significance.

The castle hill has been used since at least 400 AD, based on Roman artifacts found there. The site of the neighboring chapel has been used for religious ceremonies since the Roman era. During the 8th century the chapel site was used by a "holy bishop without a name" for Christian services.

Today the castle and chapel are located on a 67,000 square metres (720,000 sq ft) private park. While the castle is privately owned, the grounds are opened to the public twice a year.

== See also ==
- List of castles in Switzerland
