= Cham, Switzerland =

Cham
- Municipality
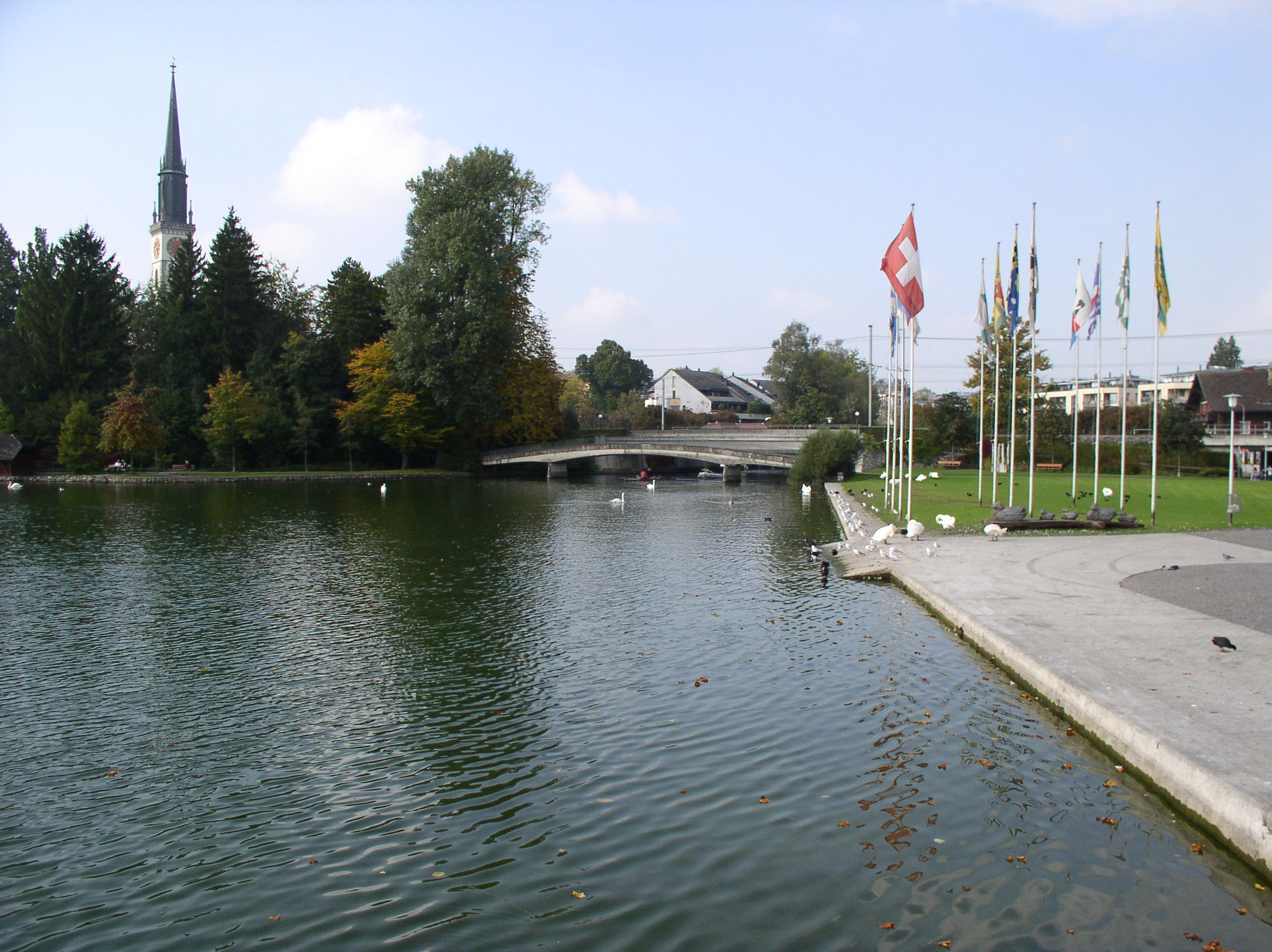

- Flag Coat of arms
- Location of Cham
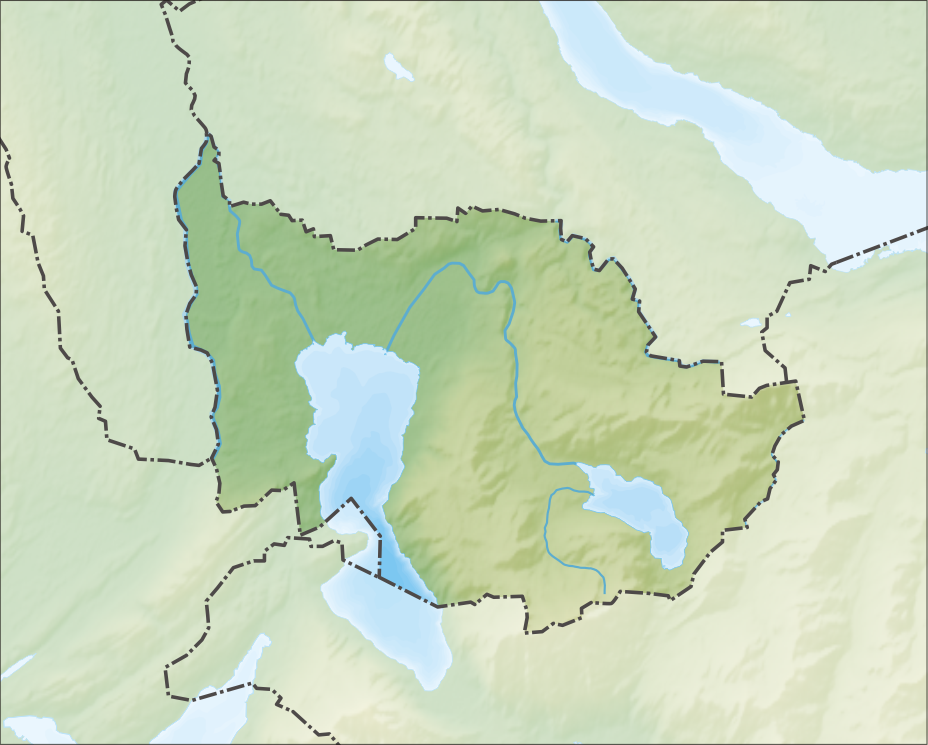
- Location within Switzerland Location within Canton of Zug
- Coordinates: 47°11′N 8°27′E
- Country: Switzerland
- Canton: Zug

Government
  - Mayor: Georges Helfenstein

Area
  - Total: 19.82 km^{2} (7.65 sq mi)
- Elevation: 420 m (1,380 ft)

Population (December 2020)
  - Total: 17,042
  - Density: 859.8/km^{2} (2,227/sq mi)
- Time zone: UTC+01:00 (CET)
  - Summer (DST): UTC+02:00 (CEST)
- Postal code: 6330
- SFOS number: 1702
- ISO 3166 code: CH-ZG
- Surrounded by: Hünenberg, Knonau (ZH), Maschwanden (ZH), Risch, Steinhausen, Zug
- Twin towns: Cham (Germany)
- Website: cham.ch

Cham (High Alemannic: Choom) is a municipality in the canton of Zug in Switzerland.

== Location ==
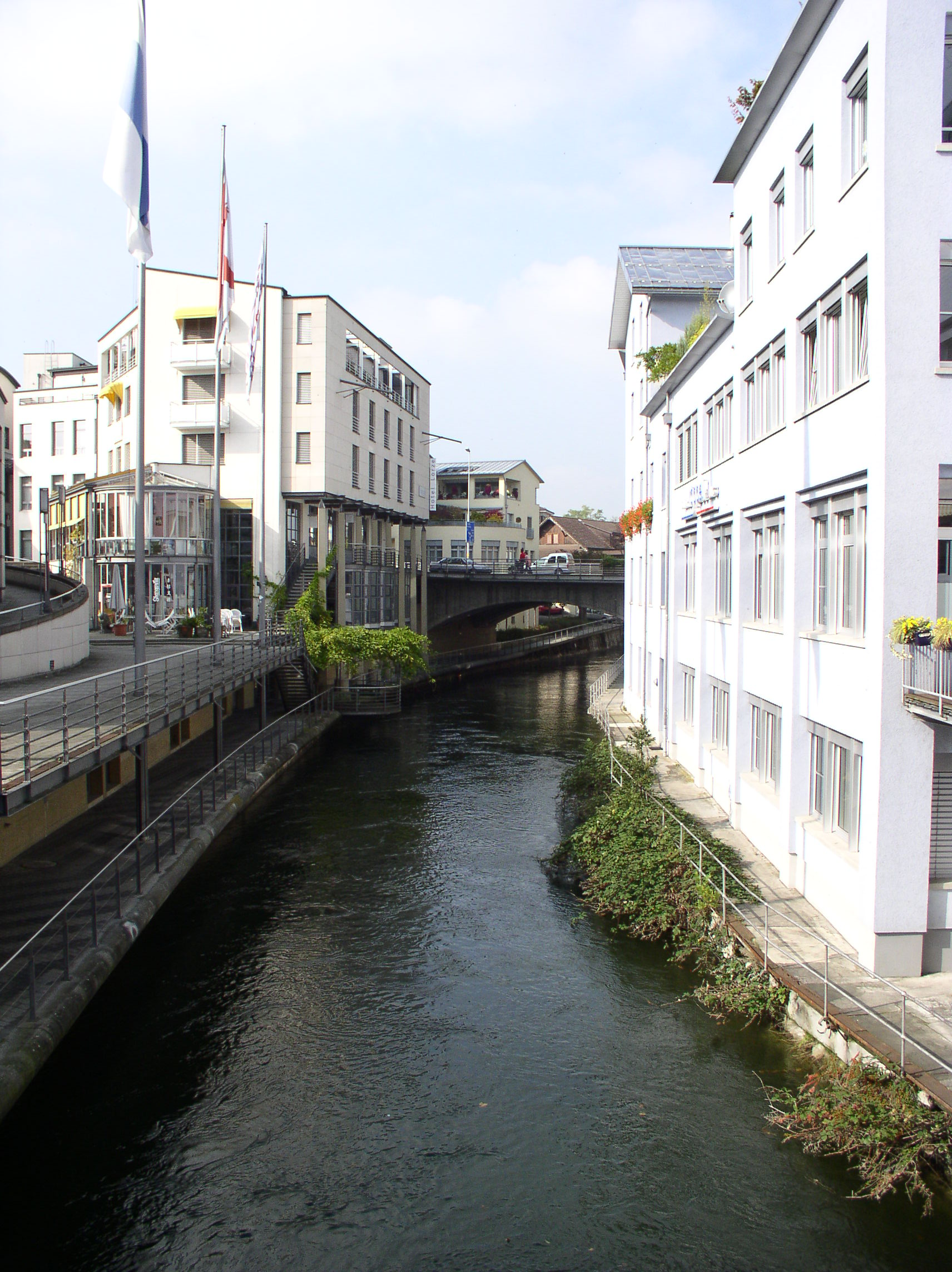
The Lorze River flows through Cham

Cham is located on the northern shore of Lake Zug, 5.5 km (3.4 mi) northwest of the cantonal capital of Zug. Surrounding Cham, Steinhausen is to the east, Hünenberg is to the west, Lake Zug is south, and Maschwanden and Knonau in the Canton of Zürich are to the north. The town has an area of 19.82 km^{2} (7.65 sq mi). The train station is located 418 m (1,371 ft) above sea level and the highest point in town is 468 m (1,535 ft) above sea level.

The town is located at the mouth of the Lorze river, with two sections (Kirchbühl and Städtli) located on both sides of the river. Cham also includes a number of smaller villages; Enikon, Lindencham, Friesencham, Hagendorn, Rumentikon, Niederwil, Oberwil and Bibersee.

Cham has an area, as of 2006, of 17.8 km^{2} (6.9 sq mi). Of this area, 63.3% is used for agricultural purposes, while 13.2% is forested. Of the rest of the land, 21.7% is settled (buildings or roads) and the remainder (1.8%) is non-productive (rivers, glaciers or mountains).

== History ==
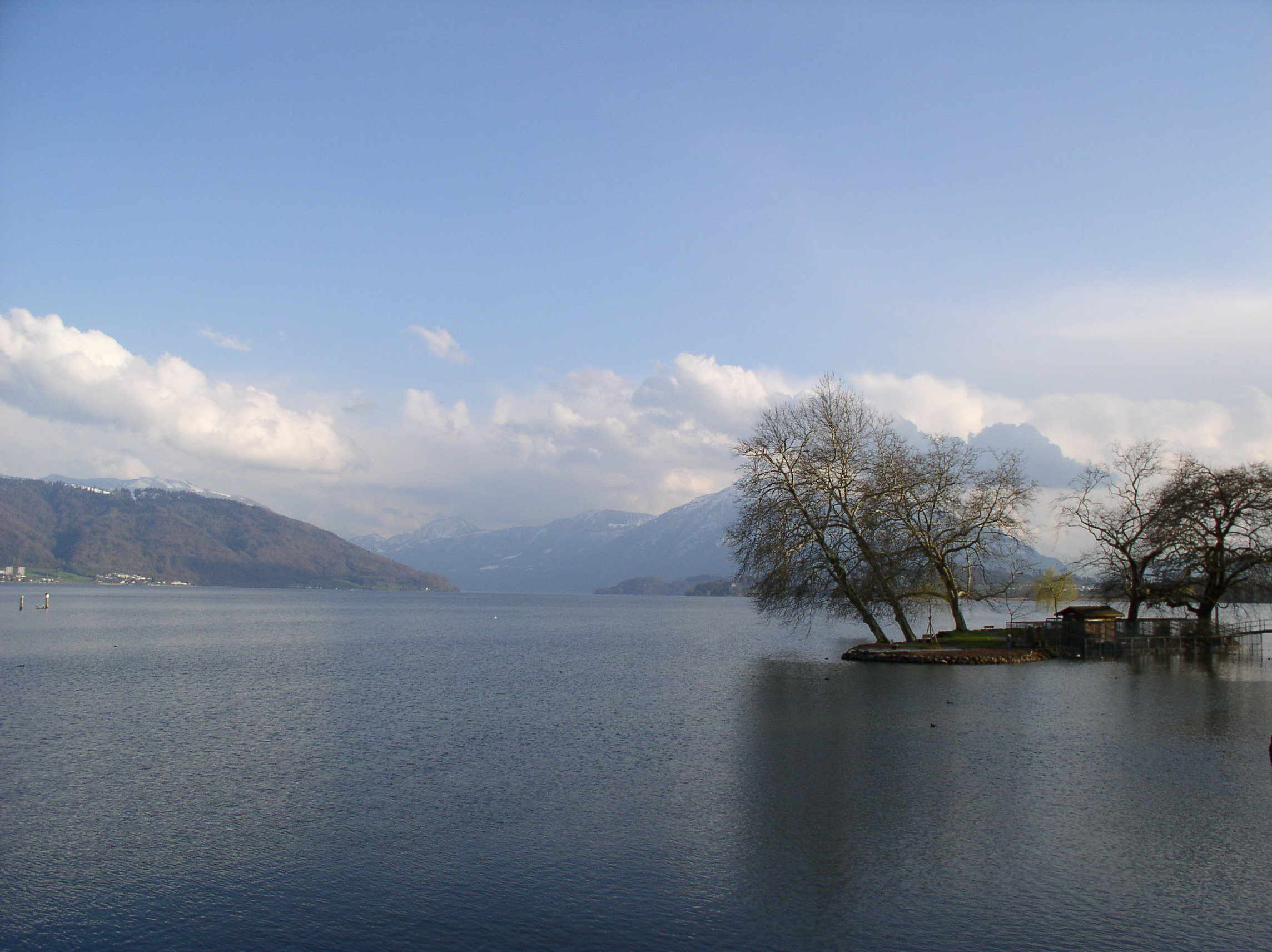
Lake Zug, near Cham

The shores of Lake Zug were populated at least 6000 years ago with several sites in Cham. A number of finds in the village of Oberwil in Cham show that there were a number of middle and late Bronze Age settlements in Cham. In 1944–45 a large, unique Roman watermill with multiple waterwheels was found in the village of Hagendorn. A Roman warehouse from the same era has been discovered in the village of Heiligkreuz.

The city's name, Cham, means 'village' and refers to a large Celtic settlement on the shore of Lake Zug. Following the collapse of the Western Roman Empire, there was also an Alamannic settlement, but only place names remain. The first mention of the town (as Chama) occurred on 16 April 858 when King Louis the German gave the town to his daughter, Hildegard, the abbess of the Fraumünster Abbey in Zürich. The town was administered by a variety of nobles and bailiffs over the following centuries.

In 1360 the town was granted a charter as well as the rights to hold a market and enroll citizens. This charter, granted by Charles IV, was given to Gottfried von Hünenberg as the ruler of the city. The Habsburgs, attempting to maintain their influence in the region following the loss of Zug to the Swiss Confederation in 1364, bought part of the town in 1366 and completely bought the Hünenberg family out in 1370. However, following the decisive Habsburg defeat in the Battle of Sempach in 1386, Cham was taken by Zug and Schwyz. The Habsburgs had pawned the town to a citizen of Zürich, Götz Mülner, and so Zug was not able to completely own the city until the loan was repaid in 1415. The city would remain under the control of the vogt or bailiff of Zug until the French invasion of 1798.

In the 16th century, the reform-minded preacher Jost Müller unsuccessfully attempted to bring the Reformation to Cham.

Aerial view by Walter Mittelholzer (1919)

Following the 1798 invasion of Switzerland and the collapse of the Old Swiss Confederacy, Cham finally became an independent town; although the citizens still paid some taxes and tithes to Zug until 1816 when most were abolished and 1872 when the last one ended.

The rapid industrialization of the second half of the 19th century caused a population boom in Cham and the surrounding villages. The population doubled between 1850 and 1880 and continued to grow at a slightly slower rate afterward. The first urban plan and construction ordinances came into being in 1950. A goal of the planning was to maintain the character of the industrial part of the city, becoming a center for the surrounding villages and preserve the parkland along the lake. In 1991 the town was awarded the Wakker Prize for the preservation of its architectural heritage. By 1990 Cham was the third largest city in the canton of Zug.

== Geography ==
=== Climate ===
Cham has an average of 136.1 days of rain per year and on average receives 1,147 mm (45.2 in) of precipitation. The wettest month is June during which time Cham receives an average of 144 mm (5.7 in) of precipitation. During this month, there is precipitation for an average of 13.5 days. The driest month of the year is February with an average of 69 mm (2.7 in) of precipitation over 13.5 days.

== Demographics ==
Historical population
Year	Pop.	±%
1771	839	—
1850	1,321	+57.4%
1888	3,140	+137.7%
1900	2,025	−35.5%
1950	5,486	+170.9%
1970	8,209	+49.6%
1991	11,091	+35.1%
2000	13,145	+18.5%
2005	13,791	+4.9%
2006	13,730	−0.4%
2007	13,981	+1.8%
2013	15,020	+7.4%
2018	16,884	+12.4%

Cham has a population (as of 31 December 2020) of 17,042. As of December 2008 19.6% of the population was made up of foreign nationals. Over the last 10 years, the population has grown at a rate of 14%. Most of the population (as of 2000) speaks German (85.7%), with Serbo-Croatian being second most common (3.1%) and Italian being third (1.9%).

In the 2007 federal election, the most popular party was the SVP which received 31.3% of the vote. The next three most popular parties were the CVP (22.2%), the FDP (18.2%) and the Green Party (17.8%).

In Cham, about 76.4% of the population (between age 25–64) have completed either non-mandatory upper secondary education or additional higher education (either a university or a Fachhochschule).

== Sights and recreation ==
This small town has its own medical clinic, institutions for primary and secondary education, kindergarten and a public green with sports facilities available all year round.

Cham also provides visitors and residents alike with hotel services, congress hall, churches (Roman Catholic and Reformed), a marina, and a castle (St. Andreas). The church of St. James is a late Baroque building from the 18th century, with a late Gothic tower from the 15th century. There are several well-established restaurants providing a variety of local and international cuisines.

=== Heritage sites of national significance ===
There are a number of Swiss heritage sites of national significance in Cham. These include the Eslen, a Neolithic lake shore settlement, the church and Cistercian convent at Frauenthal, the Castle of St. Andreas, two buildings in the old city, and the brickyard.

== Transportation ==
Cham is located 5.5 km (3.4 mi) from Zug and is centrally located between Luzern (25 km (16 mi)) and Zürich (32 km (20 mi)). The Swiss Federal Railways line from Luzern through Thalwil to Zürich occasionally stops in Cham. The E41 highway passes near Cham. The city can also be reached by bus from Zug and in the summer by boat.

== Industry ==
Cham has an unemployment rate of 2.05%. As of 2005, there were 206 people employed in the primary economic sector and about 68 businesses involved in this sector. 2,151 people are employed in the secondary sector and there are 179 businesses in this sector. 4,900 people are employed in the tertiary sector, with 783 businesses in this sector.

For most of Cham's history, farming and light industry were the main sources of income. The Lorze River has always been a key for the development of the city. The first recorded watermill in Cham was built in 1279. About 1641 a dyeing and bleaching operation was built along the river. In 1657 a paper mill was built, which partly mechanized in the 1720s and had the first paper machine in 1840. Following several mergers and expansions, this factory became the first Swiss wood pulp factory. In the 20th century it became Papierfabrik Cham AG, the largest company in Cham.

In 1863, a cotton spinning and weaving company opened in Cham. Following a major fire in 1888 the factory closed, but the dormitories for child laborers for the factory are now a children's home.

In 1864, Cham was connected to the Zürich-Lucerne train line. In 1866, the American Page family founded the Anglo-Swiss Condensed Milk Company in Cham to take advantage of this new rail line. The company initially produced only condensed milk, but soon grew to produce other milk products. In 1905, it merged with the Farine Lactée Henri Nestlé Company to form Nestlé. The company expanded rapidly; by 1907, they had over 1,000 milkmen in 44 locations. In 1913 a conflict over money between the factory and the milkmen led to a strike and weakened the company. Following World War I, the company faced financial crisis and began to shut down production in Cham.

In 1905, one-third of the population worked in agriculture, while half worked in industry. By 1955, nearly two-thirds of the population worked in industry. In the following year, industrial jobs decreased while the central location and low taxes encouraged a growth in service industries. In 2001, 80% of the businesses and 58% of the jobs were in service industries, while 40% were in manufacturing.

== Sport ==
SC Cham is the municipality's football club.

== Notable people ==
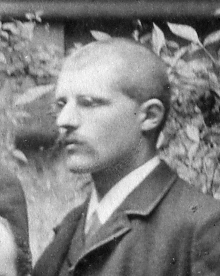
Victor Villiger, 1893

- Victor Villiger (1868 in Cham – 1934), a Swiss-born German chemist and the discoverer of the Baeyer–Villiger oxidation
- Robert Schiess (1896 in Cham – 1956), a Swiss painter and member of the Pontifical Swiss Guard
- George Page (1910 in Cham – 2001), an American alpine skier, competed in the 1936 Winter Olympics
- Grégory Rast (born 1980 in Cham), a Swiss former professional road bicycle racer
- Cora Huber (born 1981 in Cham), a Swiss bobsledder, competed at the 2006 Winter Olympics
- Priska Doppmann (born 1971 in Cham), a Swiss road racing cyclist, competed at the 2008 Summer Olympics
- Martin Elmiger (born 1978 in Hagendorn), a Swiss former road racing cyclist, Swiss National Road Race champion in 2001, 2005, 2010 and 2014
