= 2024–25 FC Basel season =

Associan football season

FC Basel
2024–25 season
- Owner: FCB Holding; David Degen
- Club president: Reto Baumgartner
- Head coach: Fabio Celestini
- Ground: St. Jakob-Park
- Swiss Super League: 1st
- Swiss Cup: Winners
- Top goalscorer: League: Xherdan Shaqiri (18); All: Xherdan Shaqiri (21)
- Highest home attendance: 36,000 (sold-out); 21 September 2024 (Zürich); 24 May 2025 (Luzern)
- Lowest home attendance: 19,866; 27 July 2024 (Lugano)
- Average home league attendance: 26,150
- Biggest win: 6–0 vs Servette (11 August 2024)
- Biggest defeat: 2–6 vs Young Boys (18 May 2025)
Home colours	Away colours	Third colours

The 2024–25 season was FC Basel's 131st season in their existence and the club's 30th consecutive season in the top flight of Swiss football since their promotion in the 1993–94 season. The 2024–25 Swiss Super League season started on 20 July 2024 and was completed on 24 May 2025. In addition to the Swiss Super League, Basel also participated in this season's edition of the Swiss Cup, starting in the third round. This was the club's first season in 25 years that they did not compete in any European competition, as since their 1999–2000 season they had always qualified for an UEFA competition, but in the previous season they had failed.

== Club ==
=== FC Basel Holding AG ===
The FC Basel Holding AG owns 75% of FC Basel 1893 AG and the other 25% is owned by the FC Basel 1893 club members. The club FC Basel 1893 functions as a base club independent of the holding company and the AG. FC Basel 1893 AG is responsible for the operational business of the club, e.g. the first team, the women's first team, a large part of the youth department and the back office are affiliated there. All decisions that affect the club FC Basel 1893 are made within the AG.

On 6 May 2024 the AGM of the FC Basel Holding AG and the FC Basel 1893 AG were held and both boards were confirmed. The Holding AG with following members: David Degen (president), Dan Holzmann, Ursula Rey-Krayer and Andreas Rey (vice-president). FC Basel 1893 AG with following members: David Degen (president), Carol Etter (delegate of the club FC Basel), Dan Holzmann, Ursula Rey-Krayer and Andreas Rey (vice-president).

=== Club management ===
Basel is the only professional club in Switzerland where the position of holding company's president and the club's president is not the same person. The club AGM also took place on 6 May 2024. With the exception of Dominik Donzé, who left the board of directors voluntarily, the entire board was re-elected with large majorities. These being Reto Baumgartner (club president), Carol Etter, Edward Turner and Tobias Adler. Donzé has held various positions on the FCB board since 2009. Two new members were also voted into the board of directors.

The board of directors of the club are:

Club chairman	(Switzerland) Reto Baumgartner
Director	(Switzerland) Carol Etter
Director	(Switzerland) Edward Turner
Director	(Switzerland) Tobias Adler
Director	(Switzerland) Andrea Häner-Roth
Director	(Switzerland) Nicole Leuthard
Ground (capacity and dimensions)	St. Jakob-Park (37,994) (36,000 for international matches) / (120x80 m)

Updated to match played 6 May 2024
Source: FCB Official Site

=== Team management ===
During the previous season the position of the FCB sport director had been left vacant following the dismissal of Heiko Vogel on 31 October 2023. On 15 May 2024 FCB announced that Daniel Stucki had been appointed as new sports director.

During May Fabio Celestini signed a new two-year contract as head coach and on 31 May 2024 they announced their training staff for the coming season:

Position	Staff
Sport director	(Switzerland) Daniel Stucki from 15 May 2024
Head coach	(Switzerland) Fabio Celestini
Assistant coach	(Switzerland) Davide Callà
Assistant coach	(Switzerland) Luigi Nocentini
Athletics coach	(Switzerland) Carlos Menéndez
Athletics coach	(Switzerland) Thomas Bernhard
Goalkeeper coach	(Switzerland) Gabriel Wüthrich
Youth Team U-21 coach	(Switzerland) Mario Cantaluppi
Youth Team U-21 co-coach	(Switzerland) Marco Aratore
Youth Team U-21 co-coach	(Switzerland) Michaël Bauch

Source: FCB official site

== Overview ==
=== Off and pre-season ===
On 31 May 2024 Basel announced that they had reached an agreement with Hellas Verona for the permanent acquisition of Kevin Rüegg. The 25-year-old full-back, who had joined FCB on loan in September 2023 had signed a three-year contract with the club, dated until the summer of 2027. Further on 21 June the club announced that they had signed the French professional footballer Léo Leroy from Ligue 1 club Montpellier.

On 7 June FCB announced that they had loaned Đorđe Jovanović to FK Partizan for the coming season. Also on that day, they announced that Sergio López had not prolonged his contract with them and that he had moved to SV Darmstadt 98. On 22 June it was announced that Maurice Malone had been loaned to FK Austria Wien.

On 28 and 29 June the club announced that they prolonged the contracts of two of their youth players until summer 2027, these were Adriano Onyegbule and Arlet Junior Zé. They also extended their contract with Andrin Hunziker until summer 2027 but loaned him out to Karlsruher SC, so as he could gain more playing experience.

On 12 July 2024 the club announced that they load Dion Kacuri out to Yverdon-Sport until the end of the season, so as the player could gain more playing time at top-level Swiss football. Further on that day, they announced that Renato Veiga had signed a contract with Chelsea. At the same time Chelsea confirmed that Veiga had signed a seven-year contract at Stamford Bridge, the contract includes a further one-year option.

A further player player who moved in was Marin Šotiček. On 18 July FCB announced the transfer from NK Lokomotiva Zagreb on a four-year deal. Then, on 22 July 2024, FCB announced the transfer of Bénie Traoré, who came in from Sheffield United for an undisclosed fee, signing a four-year deal.

On 25 July 2024 Basel announced that by mutual agreement, Michael Lang and the club had terminated their contract. It therefore turned out, that the last match of their 2023–24 season against Yverdon-Sport, which ended in a goalless draw on 21 May 2024, had been his last competition game with the team. Between the years 2015 to 2018 and again from 2021 to 2024, Lang played a total of 263 games for Basel scoring a total of 36 goals. 151 of these games were in the Swiss Super League, 14 in the Swiss Cup, 56 in the UEFA competitions (Champions League, Europa League and Conference League) and 42 were friendly games. He scored 21 goals in the domestic league, 6 in the cup, 8 in the European games and the other was scored during the test games.

On 9 August, the club announced that Liam Millar had moved on to Hull City in the EFL Championship. He had signed a permanent three-year deal, he transferred for an undisclosed fee.

Chicago Fire and Xherdan Shaqiri mutually agreed to terminate their contract on 14 August. The separation was officially amicable, with Shaqiri explaining that he felt it was the "right time" to "explore new opportunities". On 16 August, two days later, Shaqiri returned to his club of origen, rejoining them on a three-year contract.

Last season's Super League joint-top-scorer Kevin Carlos was signed by FCB on 23 August from Yverdon-Sport. Then, on 30 August the club announced the signing of Moussa Cissé from VfB Stuttgart II. On the same day the club announced that they had loaned Juan Gauto to Deportivo de La Coruña and that they had signed Romário Baró in on a one-year loan from Porto with the option of a buy-out release. At the end of the season, however, the club decided not to pull the release option and Baró returned to Porto.

Further, the club announced on 31 August that the contract with Jean-Kévin Augustin had been terminated by mutual agreement. Augustin left the club as free agent. In his two seasons with the club, he had played a total of 63 games for them scoring a total of 12 goals. 38 of these games were in the Swiss Super League, four in the Swiss Cup, nine in the UEFA Conference League and 12 were friendly games. He scored five goals in the domestic league, one in the cup, two in the European games and the other two were scored during the test games.

On 2 September, the club announced another player in on loan. The Swede Joe Mendes had joined them from Portuguese club Braga. The contract also had a buy-out option, but at the end of the season Basel decided not to pull the release option and Mendes returned to Braga.

On the final day of the transfer window, FCB announced that their captain Fabian Frei had decided to rejoin his youth club Winterthur. Between the years 2007 to 2015 and again from 2018 to 2024 Frei played a total of 679 games for Basel scoring a total of 94 goals. 386 of these games were in the Swiss Super League, 46 in the Swiss Cup, 111 in the UEFA competitions (Champions League, Europa League and Conference League) and 136 were friendly games. He scored 41 goals in the domestic league, 10 in the cup, 13 in the European games and the other 30 were scored during the test games. Fabian Frei is the clubs record holder for the number of competition matches played with the club. He played 543 games in league, cup and UEFA.

During the winter break Basel announced that they had signed Philip Otele in on a six-month loan from Al Wahda with a realse option. At the end of the season Basel announced that they had pulled the option and that Otele had signed a contract until summer 2028.

== Players ==
=== First-team squad ===
The following is the list of the Basel first team squad. It also includes players that were in the squad the day the season started on 16 July 2023, but subsequently left the club after that date.

Note: Flags indicate national team as defined under FIFA eligibility rules; some limited exceptions apply. Players may hold more than one non-FIFA nationality.

No.	Pos.	Nation	Player
1	GK	SUI	Marwin Hitz (vice-captain)
3	DF	SUI	Nicolas Vouilloz
4	DF	ESP	Arnau Comas (out)
5	MF	BRA	Metinho (on loan from Troyes)
6	DF	TUN	Mohamed Dräger (out)
7	FW	NGR	Philip Otele (on loan from Al Wahda)
7	MF	SUI	Benjamin Kololli (out)
7	FW	CAN	Liam Millar (out)
8	MF	POR	Romário Baró
9	FW	FRA	Thierno Barry (out)
9	FW	ESP	Kevin Carlos
10	FW	SUI	Xherdan Shaqiri (captain)
11	FW	CIV	Bénie Traoré
13	GK	SUI	Mirko Salvi
14	FW	SUI	Bradley Fink
17	MF	SWE	Joe Mendes
18	MF	GHA	Emmanuel Essiam
19	FW	CRO	Marin Šotiček
20	MF	SUI	Fabian Frei (out (former captain))
21	MF	GEO	Gabriel Sigua
22	MF	FRA	Léo Leroy

No.	Pos.	Nation	Player
23	FW	SUI	Albian Ajeti
25	DF	SUI	Finn van Breemen
26	DF	BIH	Adrian Leon Barišić
27	DF	SUI	Kevin Rüegg
28	DF	FRA	Hugo Vogel (U-21)
29	MF	GER	Adriano Onyegbule
29	DF	FRA	Moussa Cissé
30	FW	GER	Anton Kade
31	MF	SUI	Dominik Schmid (vice-captain)
32	DF	GHA	Jonas Adjetey
33	MF	ARG	Juan Gauto
34	MF	ALB	Taulant Xhaka (vice-captain)
35	FW	SUI	Roméo Beney (U-21)
37	MF	SUI	Leon Avdullahu
38	MF	COD	Axel Kayombo
39	MF	SUI	Arlet Junior Zé
43	DF	SUI	Marvin Akahomen (U-21)
48	FW	FRA	Aaron Akalé (U-21)
49	GK	GER	Tim Pfeiffer (U-21)
—	FW	FRA	Jean-Kévin Augustin
—	GK	SUI	Tim Spycher

=== Players out on loan ===
Note: Flags indicate national team as defined under FIFA eligibility rules; some limited exceptions apply. Players may hold more than one non-FIFA nationality.

No.	Pos.	Nation	Player
4	DF	ESP	Arnau Comas (to Eibar until 30 June 2025)
11	FW	GER	Maurice Malone (to FK Austria Wien until 30 June 2025)
17	FW	SUI	Andrin Hunziker (to Karlsruher SC until 30 June 2025)
28	MF	SUI	Dion Kacuri (to Yverdon-Sport until 30 June 2025)
29	MF	GER	Adriano Onyegbule (to FC Schaffhausen until 30 June 2025)
33	MF	ARG	Juan Gauto (to Deportivo de La Coruña until 30 June 2025)
38	MF	COD	Axel Kayombo (to FC Stade Lausanne Ouchy until 30 June 2025)
99	FW	SRB	Đorđe Jovanović (to FK Partizan until 30 June 2025)
—	GK	SUI	Tim Spycher (to Nyon until 10 January 2025)
—	MF	BEL	Jonathan Dubasin (to Real Sporting de Gijón until 30 June 2025)
—	FW	BRA	Kaio Eduardo (to Vaduz until 30 June 2025)

=== Players in on loan ===
Note: Flags indicate national team as defined under FIFA eligibility rules; some limited exceptions apply. Players may hold more than one non-FIFA nationality.

No.	Pos.	Nation	Player
5	MF	BRA	Metinho (on loan from Troyes)
8	MF	POR	Romário Baró (from Porto)
17	MF	SWE	Joe Mendes (from Braga until 30 June 2025)
7	FW	NGR	Philip Otele (on loan from Al Wahda until 30 June 2025)

=== Transfers ===
==== In ====
Note: Flags indicate national team as defined under FIFA eligibility rules; some limited exceptions apply. Players may hold more than one non-FIFA nationality.

No.	Pos.	Nation	Player
7	FW	NGR	Philip Otele (on loan from Al Wahda)
11	FW	CIV	Bénie Traoré (from Sheffield United)
19	FW	CRO	Marin Šotiček (from Lokomotiva Zagreb)
22	MF	FRA	Léo Leroy (from Montpellier)
27	DF	SUI	Kevin Rüegg (permanent from Hellas Verona)
29	DF	FRA	Moussa Cissé (from VfB Stuttgart II)
10	FW	SUI	Xherdan Shaqiri (free transfer, previously at Chicago Fire)
9	FW	ESP	Kevin Carlos (from Yverdon-Sport)

==== Out ====
Note: Flags indicate national team as defined under FIFA eligibility rules; some limited exceptions apply. Players may hold more than one non-FIFA nationality.

No.	Pos.	Nation	Player
5	DF	SUI	Michael Lang (contract terminated)
6	DF	TUN	Mohamed Dräger (to Eintracht Braunschweig)
7	MF	SUI	Benjamin Kololli (to Sion)
7	FW	CAN	Liam Millar (to Hull City)
16	GK	SUI	Nils de Mol (end of contract)
19	MF	AUT	Yusuf Demir (end of loan)
20	MF	SUI	Fabian Frei (to Winterthur)
22	DF	GER	Sergio López (to SV Darmstadt 98)
40	MF	POR	Renato Veiga (to Chelsea)
9	FW	FRA	Thierno Barry (to Villarreal)
—	FW	FRA	Jean-Kévin Augustin (contract terminated)

== Results and fixtures ==
Kickoff times are in CET. Win Draw Loss Postponed

=== Pre-season friendlies ===
5 July 2024 Friendly	Basel	1–1	Eintracht Braunschweig	Silberstadt Arena, Schwaz, Austria
15:00	Beney 35'; Adjetey (yellow card) 51'	FCB report	38' Lucoqui	Attendance: 350; Referee: Walter Altmann
Note: The game kicked off 20 minutes late because FCB coach was delayed by a traffic jam on the way to the venue. Due to the delay and the high temperatures, the teams played only twice 40 minutes.

6 July 2024 Friendly	Basel	2–1	Górnik Zabrze	Arena Jenbach, Jenbach, Austria
15:00	Fink 53'; Kololli 88'	FCB report	Lukoszek	Attendance: 255; Referee: (Austria) Stefan Gamper
Note: Fair game, no yellow cards

10 July 2024 Friendly	Basel	4–0	Bellinzona	Stadion Rankhof, Basel
16:00	Barry 19'; Beney 47'; Ajeti 73'; Kayombo 80'	FCB report		Attendance: 0 Referee: Hüseyin Sanli (Switzerland)
Note: Played behind closed doors. Fair game, no yellow cards

13 July 2024 Friendly	Basel	1–1	SSV Ulm	Stadion Schützenmatte, Basel
15:00	Frei 12'	Summary	82' Higl	Attendance: 4,200; Referee: (Switzerland) Désirée Grundbacher
Note: Fair game, no yellow cards

6 September 2024 Friendly	SC Freiburg	6–0	FC Basel	Freiburg
15:00 CEST (UTC+2)	Wörner 24', 30', 38'; Höler 57', 68'; Grifo 87'	SCF report FCB report		Stadium: Europa-Park Stadion; Attendance: 0 Referee: (Germany) Marc-Philip Eckermann
Note: Played behind closed doors. Fair game, no yellow cards

9 October 2024 Mid-season friendly	VfR Kleinhüningen	0–3	Basel	Stadion Schützenmatte, Basel
18:30	Sylla (yellow card) 31'	Summary	12' Carlos; 48' Carlos; 72' Streit	Attendance: 2,000; Referee: (Switzerland) Johannes von Mandach

13 Nov. 2024 Mid-season friendly	SC Dornach	0–6	Basel	Gigersloch, Dornach
18:30	Xheladini (yellow card) 43'	FCB summary	22' Fink; 27' Kololli; 32' Fink; 65' Casadei; 67' Jordan; (yellow card) 71' Casadei; 85' Streit	Attendance: 2,300 (sold out); Referee: (Switzerland) David Huwiler

=== Swiss Super League ===
The 2024–25 Super League season was the 128th season of top-tier competitive football in Switzerland. The Swiss Football League (SFL) drew and published the fixtures of the first 22 rounds on 18 June 2024. The rest were drawn at a later date.

==== First and second round ====
21 July 2024 Round 1	Lausanne-Sport	3–2	Basel	Stade de la Tuilière, Lausanne
16:30	Okou 2'; Diabaté 22'; Sène 44'; Bernède (yellow card) 49'; Sanches (yellow card) 51'; Mouanga (yellow card) 57'; Abdallah (yellow card) 86'	FCB report	(yellow card) 17' Beney; (yellow card) 34' Comas; (yellow card) 35' Kade; 43', 87' (pen.) Barry; (yellow card) 63' Barišić	Attendance: 6,850; Referee: (Switzerland) Anojen Kanagasingam

27 July 2024 Round 2	Basel	1–2	Lugano	St. Jakob-Park, Basel
20:30	Leroy 50', (yellow card) 59'	FCB report	Aliseda 8'; Hajdari (yellow card) 53'; Przybyłko 69'	Attendance: 19,866; Referee: (Switzerland) Urs Schnyder

3 August 2024 Round 3	Grasshopper Club	0–3	Basel	Letzigrund, Zürich
18:00	Schürpf (yellow card) 22'; Tobers (yellow card) 52'; Paskotši (yellow card) 54'; Babunski (yellow card) 75'; Stroscio (yellow card) 90+5'	FCB report	25' Traoré; 36', 58' Barry	Attendance: 9,099; Referee: (Switzerland)

11 August 2024 Round 4	Servette	0–6	Basel	Stade de Genève, Geneva
16:30		FCB report	37' Barry; 46' Traoré; 63' Ajeti; (yellow card) 69' Adjetey; (yellow card) 74' van Breemen; 76' Ajeti; 81' Šotiček; 87' Kololli	Attendance: 8,327; Referee: (Switzerland) Mirel Turkes

25 August 2024 Round 5	Basel	2–0	Yverdon	St. Jakob-Park, Basel
16:30	Ajeti 8'; Fink 55'	FCB report	(yellow card) 40' Komano; (yellow card) 49' Sylla	Attendance: 30,013; Referee: (Switzerland) Lukas Fähndrich

31 August 2024 Round 6	Sion	1–1	Basel	Stade Tourbillon, Sion
18:00	Chouaref 26'; Hefti (yellow card) 44'; Dejan Sorgić (yellow card) 87'	FCB report	5' Ajeti; (yellow card) 45+2' Avdullahu; (yellow card) 81' Carlos	Attendance: 13,200; Referee: (Switzerland) Stefan Horisberger

21 September 2024 Round 7	Basel	0–2	Zürich	St. Jakob-Park, Basel
20:30	Baró (yellow card) 77' (yellow-red card) 86'	FCB report	31' Chouiar; (yellow card) 35' Nikola Katić; 55' Perea; (yellow card) 57' Condé; (yellow card) 63' Marchesano; (yellow card) 83' Gómez	Attendance: 36,000 (sold-out); Referee: (Switzerland) Lionel Tschudi (Neuchâtel)

29 September 2024 Round 8	Luzern	1–0	Basel	Swissporarena, Luzern
16:30	Beloko (yellow card) 48'; Jaquez 78'; Ottiger (yellow card) 87'	FCB report	(yellow card) 45+4' Vouilloz; (yellow card) 56' Avdullahu; (yellow card) 85' Fink	Attendance: 15,680 (sold-out); Referee: (Switzerland) Sven Wolfensberger

6 October 2024 Round 9	Basel	1–0	Young Boys	St. Jakob-Park, Basel
16:30	Leroy (yellow card) 35'; Avdullahu (yellow card) 42'; Barišić 52'; Šotiček (yellow card) 78'; Xhaka (yellow card) 90+3'	FCB report	(yellow card) 19' Niasse; (red card) 40' Lauper; (yellow card) 42' Ganvoula; (yellow card) 59' Ugrinić; (yellow card) 70' Hadjam	Attendance: 28,463; Referee: (Switzerland) Luca Cibelli
Note: 16' shot from Ugrinić hits the post. 61' header from Carlos hits the crossbar.

20 October 2024 Round 10	Basel	2–1	St. Gallen	St. Jakob-Park, Basel
16:30	Carlos 51'; Traoré (yellow card) 56'; Carlos 90+5'	FCB report	7' Geubbels; (yellow card) 8' Geubbels; (yellow card) 24' Görtler; (yellow card) 61' Stanić; (yellow card) 82' Vallçi	Attendance: 27,009; Referee: (Switzerland) Fedayi San (Gebenstorf)
Note: 74' header from Carlos hits the crossbar.

26 October 2024 Round 11	Winterthur	1–6	Basel	Schützenwiese, Winterthur
18:00	Frei (yellow card) 50'; Schneider 90'	FCB summary	8' Carlos; 25' Traoré; 33' Shaqiri; (yellow card) 45+1' Barišić; 48' Baró; 57' Shaqiri; 72' Šotiček	Attendance: 8,700 (sold ou); Referee: (Switzerland) Alessandro Dudic
Note: 23' Corner-kick from Shaqiri hit the cross-bar

30 October 2024 Round 12	Young Boys	3–2	Basel	Stadion Wankdorf, Bern
20:30	Blum (yellow card) 6'; Ugrinić 64'; Virginius (yellow card) 69'; Dräger 81' (o.g.); Barišić 87' (o.g.)	FCB summary	19' Kade; (yellow card) 26' Vouilloz; (yellow card) 35' Kade; (yellow card) 68' Shaqiri; (yellow card) 70' Mendes; (yellow card) 81' Leroy; 89' Schmid	Attendance: 30,024; Referee: (Switzerland) Fedayi San (Gebenstorf)

2 November 2024 Round 13	Basel	5–0	Winterthur	St. Jakob-Park, Basel
18:00	Kade 14'; Mendes (yellow card) 25'; Traoré 28'; Carlos 39'; Traoré 55'; Schmid (yellow card) 64'; Ajeti 81'	FCB summary	(yellow card) 56' Lekaj	Attendance: 22,670; Referee: (Switzerland) Luca Piccolo

9 November 2024 Round 14	Yverdon-Sport	1–4	Basel	Stade Municipal, Yverdon-les-Bains
18:00	Rodrigues (yellow card) 62'; Rodrigues 89'	FCB summary	32' Schmid; (yellow card) 45' Traoré; 45+1' Traoré; 51' Avdullahu; 60' Carlos; (yellow card) 66' Kade; (yellow card) 85' Carlos	Attendance: 4,250; Referee: (Switzerland) Sven Wolfensberger

24 November 2024 Round 15	Basel	3–1	Servette	St. Jakob-Park, Basel
16:30	Barišić (yellow card) 32'; Shaqiri 40', 90+1', 90+2'	FCB summary	55' Cognat; (yellow card) 69' Cognat	Attendance: 26,247; Referee: (Switzerland) Lionel Tschudi (Neuchâtel)

30 November 2024 Round 16	Basel	1–1	Lausanne-Sport	St. Jakob-Park, Basel
18:00	Šotiček 14'; Vouilloz (yellow card) 63'	Report	Sow (yellow card) 34'; Okou 55'; Bernède (yellow card) 65'; Polster (yellow card) 76'; Diabaté (yellow card) 90+3'	Attendance: 22,204; Referee: (Switzerland) Stefan Horisberger

8 December 2024 Round 17	St. Gallen	1–1	Basel	Kybunpark, St. Gallen
16:30	Vallçi 38'; Stevanović (yellow card) 62'; Jordi Quintillà (yellow card) 87'	FCB report	(yellow card) 17' Schmid; (yellow card) 55' Avdullahu; (red card) 74' Traoré; 85' Kade	Attendance: 19,700; Referee: (Switzerland) Lionel Tschudi

14 December 2024 Round 18	Basel	0–1	Grasshopper Club	St. Jakob-Park, Basel
20:30	van Breemen (yellow card) 73'	FCB report	21' Persson; (yellow card) 28' Decarli; (yellow card) 43' Abrashi; (yellow card) 54' Meyer; (yellow card) 56' Lee	Attendance: 23,486; Referee: (Switzerland) Luca Piccolo; Assistant referees: (Switzerland) Mirel Turkes (VAR); Man of the Match: Noah Persson

19 January 2025 Round 19	Lugano	2–2	Basel	Cornaredo, Lugano
16:30	Grgić 45+2' (pen.); Hajdari 53'; Steffen (yellow card) 57'; Brault-Guillard (yellow card) 90+2'	FCB report	Kevin Carlos 24'; Mendes (yellow card) 28'; Leroy (yellow card) 36'; Schmid (yellow card) 42'; Cissé (yellow card) 74'; Shaqiri 87' (pen.)	Attendance: 4,888; Referee: (Switzerland) Sven Wolfensberger

26 January 2025 Round 20	Basel	4–1	Sion	St. Jakob-Park, Basel
16:30	Carlos (yellow card) 30' (goal) 53'; Schmid 45'; Mendes 66'; Otele 76'; Ajeti (red card) 90+5'	FCB report	Berdayes 20'; Hefti (yellow card) 55'	Attendance: 22,301; Referee: (Switzerland) Sandro Schärer

2 February 2025 Round 21	Zürich	0–1	Basel	Letzigrund, Zürich
16:30	Chouiar (penalty missed) 33′ Ballet (yellow card) 35'; Markelo (yellow card) 41'	FCB report	(yellow card) 32' Avdullahu; 36' Carlos; (yellow card) 41' Schmid	Attendance: 21,690; Referee: (Switzerland) Fedayi San (Gebenstorf)
Note: 33 minute: Hitz saved the penalty from Chouiar

6 February 2025 Round 22	Basel	2–1	Luzern	St. Jakob-Park, Basel
20:30	Shaqiri 4' (pen.); Avdullahu (yellow card) 51'; Shaqiri 57' (pen.); Mendes (yellow card) 89'	FCB report	1' Winkler; (yellow card) 58' Knezevic; (yellow card) 81' Kadák; (red card) 90+4' Cigaņiks	Attendance: 21,594; Referee: (Switzerland) Alessandro Dudic

==== Third round ====
The fixtures and dates for the third round were announced on 20 December.

9 February 2025 Round 23	Servette	2–1	Basel	Stade de Genève, Geneva
14:15	Tsunemoto (yellow card) 27'; Cognat (yellow card) 46'; Antunes 50'; Kutesa 61'; Kutesa (yellow card) 62'	FCB report	73' Otele; (yellow card) 79' Schmid	Attendance: 10,021; Referee: (Switzerland) Sven Wolfensberger

16 February 2025 Round 24	Basel	1–1	Lausanne-Sport	St. Jakob-Park, Basel
16:30	Carlos 3' (yellow card) (yellow card)	FCB report	(yellow card) 16' Ludovic Magnin (coach); (yellow card) 20' Okou; (yellow card) 20' Baldé; (yellow card) 55' Custodio; 67' (o.g.) Hitz; (yellow card) 80' Letica; (yellow card) 90+3' Giger	Attendance: 22,754; Referee: (Switzerland)

22 February 2025 Round 25	St. Gallen	2–2	Basel	Kybunpark, St. Gallen
20:30	Vallçi (yellow card) 38'; Witzig 78'; Geubbels 87'; Vandermersch (yellow card) 90'	FCB report	10' Leroy; (yellow card) 63' Mendes; 71' (o.g.) Yannick; (yellow card) 84' Carlos; (yellow card) 90+3' Schmid	Attendance: 19,335; Referee: (Switzerland) Urs Schnyder

1 March 2025 Round 26	Basel	2–0	Sion	St. Jakob-Park, Basel
18:00	Avdullahu (yellow card) 1'; Kololli 17' (o.g.); Shaqiri 25'; Otele (yellow card) 29'; Leroy (yellow card) 83'	FCB report		Attendance: 22,298; Referee: (Switzerland) Sven Wolfensberger
Note: 7' goal from Bouriga disallowed due to off-side. 79' shot against crossbar from van Breemen. 88' shot against crossbar from Sorgić

9 March 2025 Round 27	Luzern	1–1	Basel	Swissporarena, Luzern
16:30	Knezevic 78'	FCB report	(yellow card) 31' Barišić; 41' Traoré; (yellow card) 76' Mendes	Attendance: 15,500; Referee: (Switzerland) Urs Schnyder

16 March 2025 Round 28	Basel	1–2	Young Boys	St. Jakob-Park, Basel
16:30	Otele 67'	Report	Fassnacht 1' (yellow card) 45' (goal) 78'; Blum (yellow card) 23'; Keller (yellow card) 38'	Attendance: 28,570; Referee: (Switzerland) Urs Schnyder

30 March 2025 Round 29	Winterthur	0–2	Basel	Schützenwiese, Winterthur
14:15	Ulrich (yellow card) 45'; Diaby (yellow card) 90+3'	Report	Shaqiri 49' (yellow card) 90+3'; Traoré 70'	Attendance: 8,700; Referee: (Switzerland) Lukas Fähndrich

3 April 2025 Round 30	Basel	2–1	Grasshopper Club	St. Jakob-Park, Basel
20:30	Schmid 16'; Otele 40'; Mendes (yellow card) 69'; Vouilloz (yellow card) 82'; Kevin Carlos (yellow card) 86'	Report	Paskotši (yellow card) 50'; Hassane (yellow card) 57'; Morandi 70' (pen.); Hammel (yellow card) 89'	Attendance: 21,705; Referee: (Switzerland) Fedayi San

6 April 2025 Round 31	Basel	2–0	Lugano	St. Jakob-Park, Basel
16:30	Shaqiri (yellow card) 12' (goal) 63'; Ajeti (yellow card) 33'; Metinho (yellow card) 39'; Šotiček 82'	Report	Mai (yellow card) 45+2'; Bislimi (yellow card) 87'	Attendance: 28,662; Referee: (Switzerland) Johannes von Mandach

12 April 2025 Round 32	Zürich	0–4	Basel	Letzigrund, Zürich
20:30	David Vujevic (yellow card) 24'; Cheveyo Tsawa (yellow card) 50'; Vincent Nvendo (yellow card) 75'; Kamberi (yellow card) 87'	Report	Otele 10' 58'; Vouilloz (yellow card) 19'; Metinho (yellow card) 28'; Shaqiri 43' 52'; Akahomen (yellow card) 77'	Attendance: 23,130; Referee: (Switzerland) Luca Cibelli

21 April 2025 Round 33	Basel	5–0	Yverdon	St. Jakob-Park, Basel
16:30 CET	Otele 16' 56'; Shaqiri 27'; Traoré 30' 37'; Sigua (yellow card) 82'	Report	Céspedes (yellow card) 6'; Piccini (yellow card) 25'; Łęgowski (yellow card) 44'; Moussa Baradji (yellow card) 47'; Tijani (yellow card) 66'; Núñez (yellow card) 68'; Kongsro (yellow card) 86'	Referee: (Switzerland) Alessandro Dudic

==== League table at split ====
Pos	Team	Pld	W	D	L	GF	GA	GD	Pts	(Note: Teams play each other three times (33 matches), before the league is split into two groups (the top six and the bottom six).)
1	Basel	33	18	7	8	72	32	+40	61	To championship group
2	Servette	33	15	10	8	51	42	+9	55	To championship group
3	Young Boys	33	15	8	10	49	42	+7	53	To championship group
4	Luzern	33	14	9	10	61	51	+10	51	To championship group
5	Lugano	33	14	7	12	48	47	+1	49	To championship group
6	Lausanne-Sport	33	13	8	12	52	44	+8	47	To championship group
7	St. Gallen	33	12	11	10	46	43	+3	47	To relegation group
8	Zürich	33	13	8	12	44	48	−4	47	To relegation group
9	Sion	33	9	9	15	41	51	−10	36	To relegation group
10	Grasshopper Club	33	7	12	14	35	46	−11	33	To relegation group
11	Yverdon-Sport	33	8	9	16	33	57	−24	33	To relegation group
12	Winterthur	33	8	6	19	32	61	−29	30	To relegation group

Updated to match(es) played on 21 April 2025. Source: Swiss Super League
Rules for classification: 1) Points; 2) Goal difference; 3) Goals scored; 4) Head-to-head goal difference; 5) Head-to-head goals scored 6) Away goals scored; 7) Draw.

==== Championship group ====
4 May 2025 Round 34	Basel	5–1	Servette	St. Jakob-Park, Basel
16:30	Shaqiri 28'; Avdullahu (yellow card) 33'; Ajeti 34'; Ajeti 38'; Traoré 76'; Vouilloz 79'	FCB report	55' Adams; (yellow card) 19' (yellow-red card) 48' Alexis Antunes	Attendance: 32,580; Referee: (Switzerland) Lukas Fähndrich

10 May 2025 Round 35	Lugano	2–5	Basel	Cornaredo, Lugano
20:30	Bislimi 2'; Steffen (yellow card) 59'; Brault-Guillard (yellow card) 64'; Grgić 69' (pen.); Zanotti (yellow card) 75'	FCB report	4' Ajeti; (yellow card) 33' (yellow-red card) 42' Ajeti; 48' Shaqiri; 51' Shaqiri; 57' Shaqiri; 60' Leroy	Attendance: 5,318; Referee: (Switzerland) Alessandro Dudic

14 May 2025 Round 36	Lausanne-Sport	2–3	Basel	Stade de la Tuilière, Lausanne
20:30	Roche 13'; Sène 78'	FCB report	19' Carlos; 30' Carlos; 55' Traoré	Attendance: 9,494; Referee: (Switzerland) Sandro Schärer (Buttikon)
Note: Fair game, no yellow cards

18 May 2025 Round 37	Young Boys	6–2	Basel	Stadion Wankdorf, Bern
14:15	Lauper (yellow card) 1'; Itten 10'; Colley (yellow card) 17'; Maleš 29'; Itten 46'; Fassnacht 86' Fassnacht 90+3'	FCB report	7' Ajeti; (yellow card) 17' Avdullahu; (yellow card) 29' Hitz; 72' Carlos	Attendance: 31,500 (sold-out); Referee: (Switzerland) Urs Schnyder

24 May 2025 Round 38	Basel	4–0	Luzern	St. Jakob-Park, Basel
18:00	Ajeti 18'; Otele 40'; Kade (yellow card) 49'; Kade 55'; Traoré 70'	FCB report	(yellow card) 29' Rrudhani; (yellow card) 84' Dorn	Attendance: 36,000 (sold-out); Referee: (Switzerland) Fedayi San (Gebenstorf)

==== Final league table ====
Pos	Team	Pld	W	D	L	GF	GA	GD	Pts	Qualification or relegation (Note: Teams play each other three times (33 matches), before the league is split into two groups (the top six and the bottom six).)
1	Basel (C)	38	22	7	9	91	43	+48	73	Qualification for the Champions League play-off round
2	Servette	38	17	12	9	64	55	+9	63	Qualification for the Champions League second qualifying round
3	Young Boys	38	17	10	11	60	49	+11	61	Qualification for the Europa League play-off round (Note: The 2024–25 Swiss Cup winner (Basel) qualifies for the Europa League play-off round. Since the cup winner finished in the top three, the remaining European berths were passed down to the next highest qualifying teams.)
4	Lugano	38	15	9	14	55	58	−3	54	Qualification for the Europa League second qualifying round
5	Lausanne-Sport	38	14	11	13	62	54	+8	53	Qualification for the Conference League second qualifying round
6	Luzern	38	14	10	14	66	64	+2	52	
7	Zürich	38	15	8	15	56	57	−1	53	
8	St. Gallen	38	13	13	12	52	53	−1	52	
9	Sion	38	11	11	16	47	57	−10	44	
10	Winterthur	38	11	7	20	43	68	−25	40	
11	Grasshopper Club (O)	38	9	12	17	43	53	−10	39	Qualification for the Relegation play-off
12	Yverdon-Sport (R)	38	9	12	17	40	68	−28	39	Relegation to Swiss Challenge League

Source: Swiss Super League
Rules for classification: 1) Points; 2) Goal difference; 3) Goals scored; 4) Head-to-head goal difference; 5) Head-to-head goals scored 6) Away goals scored; 7) Draw.
(C) Champions; (O) Play-off winners; (R) Relegated

=== Swiss Cup ===
The fixtues and dates of the first round were drawn in June 2024

17 August 2024 Round 1	FC Subingen	0–8	Basel	Sportplatz Affoltern, Subingen
16:00		FCB report	4' (pen.) Kololli; 10' Ajeti (Kololli); 14' Barry Traoré; 34' Barry (Ajeti); 39' Barry (van Breemen); 53' Ajeti (Šotiček); 74' Fink (Šotiček); 87' Šotiček (Beney)	Attendance: 4,537 (stadium record, sold-out); Referee: (Switzerland) Stefan Horisberger
Note: Fair game, no yellow cards

15 September 2024 Round 2	Stade Nyonnais	0–1 (a.e.t.)	Basel	Stade de Colovray
16:30	Gazzetta (yellow card) 22'; Escorza (yellow card) 82'; Pasche (yellow card) 89'; Jaiteh (yellow card) 120+2'; Petit (yellow card) 120+3'; Koré (penalty missed) 120+4′	FCB report	(yellow card) 22' Adjetey; (yellow card) 68' (yellow-red card) 117' Avdullahu; 120+3' (pen.) Shaqiri; (yellow card) 120+4' Xhaka	Attendance: 3,100; Referee: (Switzerland) Luca Cibelli
Note: Hitz held the penalty shot from Koré in the fourth minute of added time.

4 December 2024 Round 3	Basel	2–2 (a.e.t.) (4–1 p)	Sion	St. Jakob-Park, Basel
20:15	Shaqiri 5'; Vouilloz (yellow card) 40'; Kade 86'	Report	30' Bouchlarhem; 38' Bouchlarhem; (yellow card) 42' Chouaref; (yellow card) 51'Bouchlarhem; (yellow card) 98' Batata; (yellow card) 101' Kabacalman	Attendance: 16,301; Referee: (Switzerland) Sandro Schärer
	Penalties
	Shaqiri (penalty scored); Kade (penalty scored); Carlos (penalty scored); Fink (penalty scored)		(penalty missed) Souza; (penalty missed) Schmied; (penalty scored) Batata

24 February 2025 Quarter-final	Étoile Carouge	1–3	Basel	Stade de la Fontenette, Carouge
19:30	Alves (yellow card) 19'; Zoukit (yellow card) 49'; Correia 55'; Petit (yellow card) 78'	FCB report	84' Sigua; 85' Carlos; 87' Carlos	Attendance: 4,100; Referee: (Switzerland) Lionel Tschudi (Neuchâtel)

27 April 2025 Semi-final	Basel	3–2 (a.e.t.)	Lausanne-Sport	St. Jakob-Park, Basel
15:30	Traoré 46'; Baldé 74' (o.g.); Ajeti (yellow card) 92'; Schmid (yellow card) 107'; Leroy 110'	FCB report	27' Mouanga; 66' Baldé; (yellow card) 85' Roche; (yellow card) 116' Dussenne	Attendance: 33,071; Referee: (Switzerland) Fedayi San (Gebenstorf)

1 June 2025 Final	FC Biel-Bienne	1–4	FC Basel	Stadion Wankdorf, Bern
14:00	Beyer 61' (pen.); Radtke (yellow card) 65'	Fussball-Schweiz summary	De Freitas 35' (o.g.); Shaqiri 67' (pen.); Šotiček 78'; Cissé 80'	Attendance: 30,897 (sold-out); Referee: Stefan Horisberger
Note: For the first time in the 100-year history of the Swiss Cup, a team from the third highest league (Promotion League) had reached final of the competition. It was the last game at the highest level as referee for Stefan Horisberger who retired after the final whistle.

== See also ==
- History of FC Basel
- List of FC Basel players
- List of FC Basel seasons

== Sources ==
- FCB squad 2024–25 at fcb-archiv.ch
- Switzerland 2024–25 at RSSSF
