= Adrian-Leon Barišić =

Bosnian footballer (born 2001)

Personal information
- Date of birth: 19 July 2001 (age 25)
- Place of birth: Stuttgart, Germany
- Height: 1.92 m (6 ft 4 in)
- Position: Centre-back

Team information
- Current team: Braga
- Number: 37

Youth career
- Hajduk Split
- 2014–2015: Dinamo Zagreb
- 2015–2018: Split

Senior career*
Years	Team	Apps	(Gls)
2018–2021	Osijek II	57	(0)
2021–2023	Osijek	32	(1)
2022	→ Frosinone (loan)	12	(1)
2023–2026	Basel	63	(1)
2026	→ Braga (loan)	6	(0)
2026–	Braga	4	(0)

International career^{‡}
2019	Bosnia and Herzegovina U19	7	(0)
2020–2022	Bosnia and Herzegovina U21	9	(1)
2023–	Bosnia and Herzegovina	15	(0)
- * Club domestic league appearances and goals as of 8 November 2026 ‡ National team caps and goals as of 12 October 2025

Adrian-Leon Barišić (pronounced [ǎdrian lěon bǎriʃitɕ]; born 19 July 2001) is a professional footballer who plays as a centre-back for Primeira Liga club Braga. Born in Germany, he plays for the Bosnia and Herzegovina national team.

Barišić started his professional career at Osijek, playing first in its reserve team, before being loaned to Frosinone in 2022. The following year, he moved to Basel, who loaned him to Braga in 2026, with whom he signed permanently later that year.

A former youth international for Bosnia and Herzegovina, Barišić made his senior international debut in 2023, earning 15 caps since.

== Club career ==
=== Early career ===
Barišić started playing football at Croatian club Hajduk Split, before joining Dinamo Zagreb's youth academy in 2014. A year later, he switched to Split's youth setup. In 2018, he signed with Osijek. He made his professional debut playing for Osijek's reserve squad against Varaždin on 13 October at the age of 17.

In January 2022, he was loaned to Italian side Frosinone until the end of the season. On 12 March, he scored his first professional goal in a triumph over Alessandria.

=== Basel ===
In August 2023, Barišić was transferred to Swiss outfit Basel for an undisclosed fee. He made his official debut for the team against Zürich on 3 September and scored an own goal. On 6 October 2024, he scored his first goal for Basel against Young Boys, which secured the victory for his squad. He won his first trophy with the club on 11 May 2025, when they were crowned league champions.

=== Braga ===
In January 2026, Barišić was sent on a six-month loan to Portuguese side Braga, with an obligation to buy. He made his competitive debut for the squad against Alverca on 25 January.

== International career ==
Barišić represented Bosnia and Herzegovina at various youth levels.

In May 2023, he received his first senior call up, for UEFA Euro 2024 qualifiers against Portugal and Luxembourg. He debuted against the former on 17 June.

== Career statistics ==
=== Club ===
As of match played 21 November 2026

Appearances and goals by club, season and competition
Club	Season	League			National cup (Note: Includes Croatian Cup, Swiss Cup, Taça de Portugal)		League cup (Note: Includes Taça da Liga)		Continental		Total	
Club	Season	Division	Apps	Goals	Apps	Goals	Apps	Goals	Apps	Goals	Apps	Goals
Osijek II	2018–19	Croatian First League	4	0	–		–		–		4	0
Osijek II	2019–20	Croatian First League	18	0	–		–		–		18	0
Osijek II	2020–21	Croatian First League	25	0	–		–		–		25	0
Osijek II	2021–22	Croatian First League	10	0	–		–		–		10	0
Osijek II	Total		57	0	–		–		–		57	0
Osijek	2020–21	Croatian Football League	3	0	–		–		–		3	0
Osijek	2021–22	Croatian Football League	1	0	1	0	–		0	0	2	0
Osijek	2022–23	Croatian Football League	27	1	2	0	–		0	0	29	1
Osijek	2023–24	Croatian Football League	1	0	0	0	–		2 (Note: Appearances in UEFA Conference League)	0	3	0
Osijek	Total		32	1	3	0	–		2	0	37	1
Frosinone (loan)	2021–22	Serie B	12	1	–		–		–		12	1
Basel	2023–24	Swiss Super League	22	0	3	0	–		–		25	0
Basel	2024–25	Swiss Super League	30	1	2	0	–		–		32	1
Basel	2025–26	Swiss Super League	11	0	2	0	–		6 (Note: Two appearances in UEFA Champions League; four appearances in UEFA Europa League)	0	19	0
Basel	Total		63	1	7	0	–		6	0	76	1
Braga (loan)	2025–26	Primeira Liga	6	0	–		–		0	0	6	0
Braga	2026–27	Primeira Liga	4	0	1	0	1	0	3	0	9	0
Braga	Total		10	0	1	0	1	0	3	0	15	0
Career total			174	3	11	0	1	0	11	0	197	3

=== International ===
As of match played 12 October 2025

Appearances and goals by national team and year
National team	Year	Apps	Goals
Bosnia and Herzegovina
Bosnia and Herzegovina	2023	4	0
Bosnia and Herzegovina	2024	5	0
Bosnia and Herzegovina	2025	6	0
Total		15	0

== Honours ==
Basel

- Swiss Super League: 2024–25
- Swiss Cup: 2024–25
