= 2024–25 Yverdon-Sport FC season =

Yverdon-Sport FC
2024–25 season
- Manager: Alessandro Mangiarratti (until 17 December)
- Stadium: Stade Municipal
- Swiss Super League: 10th
- Swiss Cup: Round of 16

The 2024–25 season is the 77th season in the history of Yverdon-Sport FC, and the club's second consecutive season in the Swiss Super League. In addition to the domestic league, the team is scheduled to participate in the Swiss Cup.

== Friendlies ==
=== Pre-season ===
6 July 2024 Friendly	Thun (Switzerland)	0–1	(Switzerland) Yverdon-Sport
12:30 UTC+2			Avdic 78'

13 July 2024 Friendly	Sion (Switzerland)	4–1	(Switzerland) Yverdon-Sport
71:00 UTC+2

== Competitions ==
=== Overall record ===
Competition	First match	Last match	Starting round	Record							
Competition	First match	Last match	Starting round	Pld	W	D	L	GF	GA	GD	Win %
Swiss Super League	21 July 2024	22–24 May 2025	Matchday 1	4	0	2	2	4	7	−3	0.00
Swiss Cup	18 August 2024			0	0	0	0	0	0	+0	—
Total				4	0	2	2	4	7	−3	0.00

Last updated: 10 August 2024
Source: Soccerway

=== Swiss Super League ===
==== League table ====
Pos	Team	Pld	W	D	L	GF	GA	GD	Pts	Qualification or relegation (Note: Teams play each other three times (33 matches), before the league is split into two groups (the top six and the bottom six).)
8	St. Gallen	38	13	13	12	52	53	−1	52	
9	Sion	38	11	11	16	47	57	−10	44	
10	Winterthur	38	11	7	20	43	68	−25	40	
11	Grasshopper (O)	38	9	12	17	43	53	−10	39	Qualification for the Relegation play-off
12	Yverdon-Sport (R)	38	9	12	17	40	68	−28	39	Relegation to Swiss Challenge League

Source: Swiss Super League
Rules for classification: 1) Points; 2) Goal difference; 3) Goals scored; 4) Head-to-head goal difference; 5) Head-to-head goals scored 6) Away goals scored; 7) Draw.
(O) Play-off winners; (R) Relegated

==== Results summary ====
Overall								Home						Away					
Pld	W	D	L	GF	GA	GD	Pts	W	D	L	GF	GA	GD	W	D	L	GF	GA	GD
4	0	2	2	4	7	−3	2	0	1	1	2	4	−2	0	1	1	2	3	−1

Last updated: 10 August 2024.

==== Results by round ====
Round	1	2	3	4
Ground	H	A	A	H
Result	L	L	D	D
Position	12			

Updated to match(es) played on 10 August 2024. Source:
A = Away; H = Home; W = Win; D = Draw; L = Loss

==== Matches ====
The match schedule was released on 18 June 2024.

20 July 2024 1	Yverdon-Sport	0–2	Zürich	Yverdon-les-Bains
18:00	Céspedes (yellow card) 19'; Tijani (red card) 90+2'		Leidner (yellow card) 30'; Perea 72', (yellow card) 73'; Emmanuel 90+11'	Stadium: Stade Municipal; Referee: Johannes von Mandach

28 July 2024 2	Servette	3–2	Yverdon-Sport	Lancy
14:15	Kutesa 12'; Sauthier 22' (o.g.); Stevanović 46'; Rouiller (red card) 45+1'		Céspedes 34' (pen.); Le Pogam 63'	Stadium: Stade de Genève; Attendance: 5,436; Referee: Nico Gianforte

4 August 2024 3	Winterthur	0–0	Yverdon-Sport	Winterthur
16:30				Stadium: Schützenwiese; Attendance: 7,125; Referee: Luca Piccolo

10 August 2024 4	Yverdon-Sport	2–2	Young Boys	Yverdon-les-Bains
20:30	Kevin Carlos 5'; Kacuri (yellow card) 64'; Aké 78'; Céspedes (yellow card) 90+2'		Ganvoula 9'; Céspedes 49' (o.g.); Camara (red card) 62'; Lauper (yellow card) 86'	Stadium: Stade Municipal; Attendance: 3,200; Referee: Urs Schnyder
