= Marin Šotiček =

Croatian footballer

Personal information
- Date of birth: 18 September 2004 (age 22)
- Place of birth: Novo Mesto, Slovenia
- Height: 1.76 m (5 ft 9 in)
- Position: Winger

Team information
- Current team: Hajduk Split (on loan from Basel)
- Number: 23

Youth career
- NK Zrinski Ozalj
- –2016: NK Vinogradar
- 2016–2022: Lokomotiva Zagreb

Senior career*
Years	Team	Apps	(Gls)
2022–2024	Lokomotiva Zagreb	41	(9)
2023	→ NK Jarun Zagreb (loan)	5	(2)
2024–	Basel	56	(4)
2026–	→ Hajduk Split (loan)	12	(2)

International career^{‡}
2021–2022	Croatia U18	8	(2)
2022–2023	Croatia U19	7	(0)
2024–	Croatia U21	22	(3)
- * Club domestic league appearances and goals as of 7 November 2026 ‡ National team caps and goals as of 00:09, 7 November 2026 (UTC)

Marin Šotiček (born 18 September 2004) is a professional footballer who plays as a winger for Croatian Football League club Hajduk Split, on loan from Swiss Super League club Basel. Born in Slovenia, he represents Croatia at youth international level.

== Early life and career ==
Šotiček is from Vrhovac near Ozalj, Croatia, where he started his youth career at local club NK Zrinski Ozalj, followed by NK Vinogradar, before joining Lokomotiva Zagreb in 2016.

== Club career ==
=== Lokomotiva Zagreb ===
Šotiček signed his first contract for Lokomotiva Zagreb in July 2022, a deal which lasts until June 2024. Šotiček made his debut for Lokomotiva in a 2–1 loss in a Prva HNL game versus HNK Šibenik, coming on as a 79th-minute substitute for Jakov-Anton Vasilj. Šotiček went on to make a further five appearances that season before moving on loan to Prva NL club NK Jarun Zagreb in February 2023.

He made five appearances on loan at Jarun, scoring two goals, including his first senior goal, a 93rd-minute winner at home to Croatia Zmijavci.

He returned to Lokomotiva Zagreb and went on to make a further seven appearances that season in all competitions.

==== 2023–24 ====
In the 2023–24 season, Šotiček established himself as a consistent fixture in the Lokomotiva starting lineup at just 18 years old. He scored his first goal for the club, slotting home after a through ball from Indrit Tuci in the 65th minute to score the only goal in a 1–0 win away to Slaven Belupo. In the same season, Šotiček scored doubles against NK Rudeš, and Istra 1961, as well as a single goal in the return fixture against Slaven Belupo, to bring his tally for the season to six goals in 22 games, including 18 starts. On 28 April, he scored another brace in a 3–1 victory over league leaders Rijeka.

=== Basel ===
Šotiček signed for Swiss Super League club Basel in July 2024 on a four-year deal, He made his debut for the club on July 27th in a 2–1 home loss to Lugano, coming on as a 65th-minute substitute. He made 32 appearances in his first season, scoring six goals in all competitions, including a goal in the Swiss Cup final as Basel won 4–1 againsy Promotion League team Biel-Bienne. Basel also won the Swiss Super League that season for the first time in eight years.

==== Loan to Hajduk Split ====
In 2026, Šotiček joined Hajduk Split on loan until the end of the season.

== International career ==
Šotiček was born in Slovenia to Croatian parents. He has represented Croatia at youth levels, including U18, U19 and U21.

== Career statistics ==
As of match played 17 May 2026

Appearances and goals by club, season and competition
Club	Season	League			National cup (Note: Includes Croatian Cup, Swiss Cup)		Continental		Other		Total	
Club	Season	Division	Apps	Goals	Apps	Goals	Apps	Goals	Apps	Goals	Apps	Goals
Lokomotiva Zagreb	2022–23	Prva HNL	11	0	1	0	—		—		12	0
Lokomotiva Zagreb	2023–24	Prva HNL	30	9	3	0	—		—		33	9
Lokomotiva Zagreb	Total		41	9	4	0	—		—		45	9
Jarun (loan)	2022–23	Prva NL	5	2	0	0	—		0	0	5	2
FC Basel	2024–25	Swiss Super League	28	4	4	2	—		0	0	32	6
FC Basel	2025–26	Swiss Super League	28	0	2	1	8 (Note: Two appearance in UEFA Champions League, six appearances in UEFA Europa League)	0	0	0	38	1
FC Basel	Total		56	4	6	3	8	0	0	0	70	7
Hajduk Split (loan)	2026–27	HNL	6	2	0	0	4	0	—		10	2
Career total			108	17	10	3	12	0	0	0	130	20

== Honours ==
Basel

- Swiss Super League: 2024–25
- Swiss Cup: 2024–25
