= Moussa Cissé =

Moussa Cissé may refer to:

- Moussa Cissé (basketball) (born 2002), Guinean basketball player
- Moussa Cissé (footballer) (born 2003), French footballer
