= 2024–25 Swiss Cup =

Tournament details
- Country: Switzerland
- Date: 16 August 2024 – 1 June 2025
- Teams: 64

Final positions
- Champions: FC Basel (14th title)
- Runners-up: Biel-Bienne

Tournament statistics
- Matches played: 63
- Goals scored: 236 (3.75 per match)

The 2024–25 Swiss Cup, or Schweizer Pokal, was the 100th anniversary of Switzerland's annual football cup competition. It featured 64 teams from the first to the eight tier of the Swiss football league. The first round had been played from 16 to 18 August 2024. The final took place on 1 June 2025 and was won by FC Basel.

Servette were the defending champions, but they lost in the semi-finals to eventual winners FC Basel. By winning, Basel qualified for the play-off round of the 2025–26 UEFA Europa League.

== Participating teams ==
64 teams participate in the Swiss Cup. They come from across the three levels of the Swiss football pyramid:

- The 21 eligible members of the Swiss Football League are automatically entered
  - Twelve from the Super League
  - Nine teams from the Challenge League (Note: Liechtenstein club and Challenge League member FC Vaduz is not eligible to participate in the Swiss Cup. This spot is awarded to the Promotion League)
- 17 teams can qualify from the First League (Promotion League and 1. Liga) (Note: U21 squads of SFL teams are not eligible to participate in the Swiss Cup.)
  - Seven top ranked eligible teams of 2023–24 Swiss Promotion League
  - Ten teams from the 1. Liga
- 25 teams can qualify from the Amateur League
  - Nine teams from the 2. Liga Interregional
  - 16 teams from the 13 regional football associations (regional associations of Bern-Jura, Zürich and Eastern Switzerland (Note: Includes the Cantons of St. Gallen, Thurgau, Appenzell Innerrhoden, Appenzell Ausserrhoden, Glarus, and Grisons.) have two participants)
- Final spot is awarded to the winner of the Suva Fairplay Trophy, awarded to the fairest football club of the last season

Super League; 12 teams	Challenge League; 9 teams	Promotion League; 8 teams	1. Liga; 11 teams	2. Liga Interregional; 8 teams	2. Liga; 14 teams	3. Liga; 2 teams
FC Basel; Grasshopper Club Zürich; FC Lausanne-Sport; FC Lugano; FC Luzern; Servette FC; FC Sion; FC St. Gallen; FC Winterthur; BSC Young Boys; Yverdon-Sport FC; FC Zürich	FC Aarau; AC Bellinzona; Étoile Carouge FC; FC Stade Lausanne-Ouchy; FC Schaffhausen; FC Thun; FC Wil 1900; Neuchâtel Xamax FCS; FC Stade Nyonnais	FC Baden; FC Biel-Bienne; SC Brühl; SR Delémont; SC Kriens; FC Paradiso; FC Rapperswil-Jona; Vevey-Sports	FC Monthey; FC Solothurn; FC Langenthal; FC Prishtina Bern; FC Tuggen; SC Young Fellows Juventus; FC Wettswil-Bonstetten; FC Echallens; Lancy FC; FC Mendrisio; AC Taverne	Zug 94; Signal FC; FC Gambarogno-Contone; SC Emmen; KF Dardania SG; FC Chur 97; FC Altstätten; FC Malcantone	FC Aemme; FC Haute-Ajoie; FC Subingen; FC Le Communal Sport Le Locle; FC Suhr; Zürich City SC; FC Regensdorf; FC Dardania Lausanne; FC Genolier-Begnins; FC Ursy; FC Champel; FC Besa; FC Schattdorf; FC Printse-Nendaz (Note: FC Printse-Nendaz qualifies as the winner of the Valais Cup.)	FC Wallbach; SC Schwyz (Note: SC Schwyz qualifies as the second fairest team in Switzerland.)

== Schedule and venues ==
The table below shows the schedule of the competition. The competitor of the lower league (Note: League rankings: (SL): Swiss Super League (ChL): Swiss Challenge League (PL): Swiss Promotion League (1): 1. Liga (2I): 2. Liga Interregional (2): 2. Liga (3): 3. Liga) has home ground advantage in all rounds except the final, if applicable. The final will be held at Stadion Wankdorf, Bern.

Matchup restrictions apply in the first two rounds:

- In Round 1, clubs of the Swiss Football League (SL and ChL) cannot be drawn against each other. Furthermore, matchups are regionally drawn.
- In Round 2, teams of the Swiss Super League cannot be drawn against each other.
- From Round 3 onwards, no more matchup restrictions apply.

Round	Match date
Round 1 (round of 64)	16–18 August 2024
Round 2 (round of 32)	13–15 September 2024
Round 3 (round of 16)	3–5 December 2024
Round 4 (quarter-finals)	25–27 February 2025
Round 5 (semi-finals)	26–27 April 2025
Round 6 (final)	1 June 2025

== Results ==
=== First round ===
Matchups for the first round were drawn on 3 July 2024 and will be played between 18 and 20 August 2024. Representatives of the Swiss Football League (SL and ChL) could not be drawn against each other. Furthermore, in the first round, the matchups are regionally restricted. Teams' leagues are indicated in brackets.

Team 1	Score	Team 2
AC Taverne (1) (Ticino)	1–3	(Canton of St. Gallen) FC Wil (ChL)
SC Kriens (PL) (Canton of Lucerne)	1–2	(Ticino) AC Bellinzona (ChL)
FC Dardania Lausanne (2) (Vaud)	0–3	(Vaud) Yverdon-Sport FC (SL)
Lancy FC (1) (Canton of Geneva)	3–3 (a.e.t.) (1–4 p)	(Canton of Geneva) Etoile Carouge FC (ChL)
FC Wettswil-Bonstetten (1) (Canton of Zurich)	1–2	(Canton of Zurich) FC Winterthur (SL)
FC Schattdorf (2) (Canton of Uri)	0–1	(Ticino) FC Paradiso (PL)
FC Ursy (2) (Canton of Fribourg)	0–6	(Vaud) FC Stade Nyonnais (ChL)
FC Subingen (2) (Canton of Solothurn)	0–8	(Basel-Stadt) FC Basel (SL)
FC Baden (PL) (Aargau)	1–3	(Canton of St. Gallen) FC Rapperswil-Jona (PL)
FC Besa (2) (Canton of St. Gallen)	1–0	(Grisons) FC Chur 97 (2Int)
FC Printse-Nendaz (2) (Valais)	0–10	(Canton of Bern) BSC Young Boys (SL)
FC Echallens (1) (Vaud)	1–6	(Vaud) FC Stade Lausanne Ouchy (ChL)
FC Suhr (2) (Aargau)	0–4	(Aargau) FC Aarau (ChL)
FC Mendrisio (1) (Ticino)	1–4	(Canton of Lucerne) FC Luzern (SL)
FC Wallbach (3) (Aargau)	0–2	(Canton of Bern) FC Langenthal (1)
FC Monthey (1) (Valais)	4–3	(Canton of Solothurn) FC Solothurn (1)
FC Tuggen (1) (Canton of Schwyz)	0–2	(Canton of Schaffhausen) FC Schaffhausen (ChL)
SC Emmen (2Int) (Canton of Lucerne)	3–2	(Canton of St. Gallen) FC Altstätten (2Int)
Zürich City SC (2) (Canton of Zurich)	0–1	(Canton of Zurich) SC Young Fellows Juventus (1)
FC Le Communal Sport Le Locle (2) (Canton of Neuchâtel)	1–1 (a.e.t.) (3–1 p)	(Canton of Bern) FC Prishtina Bern (1)
FC Aemme (2) (Canton of Bern)	2–1	(Canton of Jura) FC Haute-Ajoie (2)
FC Biel-Bienne (PL) (Canton of Bern)	2–1	(Canton of Neuchâtel) Neuchâtel Xamax FCS (ChL)
SR Delémont (PL) (Canton of Jura)	1–1 (a.e.t.) (1–4 p)	(Valais) FC Sion (SL)
FC Genolier-Begnins (2) (Vaud)	1–3	(Vaud) Vevey-Sports (PL)
FC Champel (2) (Canton of Geneva)	0–7	(Vaud) FC Lausanne-Sport (SL)
Signal FC (2Int) (Canton of Geneva)	1–7	(Canton of Geneva) Servette FC (SL)
KF Dardania SG (2Int) (Canton of St. Gallen)	1–2	(Ticino) FC Gambarogno-Contone (2Int)
SC Schwyz (3) (Canton of Schwyz)	0–6	(Canton of Bern) FC Thun (ChL)
SC Brühl (PL) (Canton of St. Gallen)	1–7	(Ticino) FC Lugano (SL)
FC Regensdorf (2) (Canton of Zurich)	0–9	(Canton of Zurich) Grasshopper Club Zürich (SL)
Zug 94 (2Int) (Canton of Zug)	0–2	(Canton of Zurich) FC Zürich (SL)
FC Malcantone (2Int) (Ticino)	0–4	(Canton of St. Gallen) FC St. Gallen (SL)

=== Second round ===
The second round were drawn on 18 August 2024, following the conclusion of the first round. Teams of the Swiss Super League cannot be drawn against each other.

Team 1	Score	Team 2
FC Monthey (1) (Valais)	0–2	(Canton of Geneva) Etoile Carouge FC (ChL)
SC Emmen (2Int) (Canton of Lucerne)	1–2	(Vaud) Yverdon-Sport FC (SL)
FC Thun (ChL) (Canton of Bern)	0–2	(Canton of Zurich) Grasshopper Club Zürich (SL)
SC Young Fellows Juventus (1) (Canton of Zurich)	0–2	(Valais) FC Sion (SL)
FC Besa (2) (Canton of St. Gallen)	1–6	(Canton of Bern) FC Biel-Bienne (PL)
FC Langenthal (1) (Canton of Bern)	1–0	(Vaud) FC Stade Lausanne Ouchy (ChL)
FC Paradiso (PL) (Ticino)	1–3	(Canton of St. Gallen) FC St. Gallen (SL)
FC Rapperswil-Jona (PL) (Canton of St. Gallen)	1–3	(Ticino) FC Lugano (SL)
FC Le Communal Sport Le Locle (2) (Canton of Neuchâtel)	0–3	(Canton of Zurich) FC Zürich (SL)
Vevey-Sports (PL) (Vaud)	2–4	(Canton of Bern) BSC Young Boys (SL)
FC Wil (ChL) (Canton of St. Gallen)	2–2 (a.e.t.) (2–4 p)	(Canton of Zurich) FC Winterthur (SL)
FC Schaffhausen (ChL) (Canton of Schaffhausen)	2–1	(Canton of Geneva) Servette FC (SL)
FC Aarau (ChL) (Aargau)	1–0	(Canton of Lucerne) FC Luzern (SL)
FC Gambarogno-Contone (2Int) (Ticino)	1–2	(Ticino) AC Bellinzona (ChL)
FC Stade Nyonnais (ChL) (Vaud)	0–1 (a.e.t.)	(Basel-Stadt) FC Basel (SL)
FC Aemme (2) (Canton of Bern)	0–4	(Vaud) FC Lausanne-Sport (SL)

=== Third round ===
The third round were drawn on 15 September 2024, following the conclusion of the second round. No more match-up restrictions apply.

Team 1	Score	Team 2
FC Langenthal (1) (Canton of Bern)	0–6	(Canton of Bern) FC Biel-Bienne (PL)
Grasshopper Club Zürich (SL) (Canton of Zurich)	0–1	(Canton of Zurich) FC Zürich (SL)
FC Schaffhausen (ChL) (Canton of Schaffhausen)	0–1	(Canton of Bern) BSC Young Boys (SL)
FC Basel (SL) (Basel-Stadt)	2–2 (a.e.t.) (4–1 p)	(Valais) FC Sion (SL)
Yverdon-Sport FC (SL) (Vaud)	0–2	(Ticino) FC Lugano (SL)
FC Aarau (ChL) (Aargau)	0–1	(Canton of Geneva) Etoile Carouge FC (ChL)
FC Winterthur (SL) (Canton of Zurich)	0–3	(Vaud) FC Lausanne-Sport (SL)
AC Bellinzona (ChL) (Ticino)	1–0	(Canton of St. Gallen) FC St. Gallen (SL)

=== Quarter-finals ===
The quarter-finals will be drawn on 5 December 2024, following the conclusion of the third round.

Team 1	Score	Team 2
AC Bellinzona (ChL) (Ticino)	1–1 (a.e.t.) (3–4 p)	(Vaud) FC Lausanne-Sport (SL)
FC Biel-Bienne (PL) (Canton of Bern)	2–0	(Ticino) FC Lugano (SL)
Etoile Carouge FC (ChL) (Canton of Geneva)	1–3	(Basel-Stadt) FC Basel (SL)
FC Zürich (SL) (Canton of Zurich)	2–3	(Canton of Bern) BSC Young Boys (SL)

=== Semi-finals ===
The semi-finals were drawn on 27 February 2025, following the conclusion of the quarter-finals. FC Biel-Bienne is the only non-Super League team remaining and is the first amateur club to reach the semi-final of the Swiss Cup since 1999.

27 April 2025
15:30 CEST

FC Basel	3–2 (a.e.t.)	FC Lausanne-Sport
Traoré 46'; Baldé 74' (o.g.); Leroy 110'	Report	Mouanga 27'; Baldé 65'

St. Jakob-Park, Basel
Referee: Fedayi San
26 April 2025
20:30 CEST

FC Biel-Bienne	1–0 (a.e.t.)	BSC Young Boys
Sartoretti 99' (pen.)	Report

Tissot Arena, Biel/Bienne
Referee: Alessandro Dudic

=== Final ===
The final took place on 1 June 2025 at the Stadion Wankdorf in Bern.

1 June 2025
14:00 CEST

FC Biel-Bienne	1–4	FC Basel
Beyer 61' (pen.)	Report	De Freitas 35' (o.g.); Shaqiri 67' (pen.); Šotiček 78'; Cissé 80'

Stadion Wankdorf, Bern
Attendance: 30,897
Referee: Stefan Horisberger
