= Xherdan Shaqiri =

Swiss footballer (born 1991)

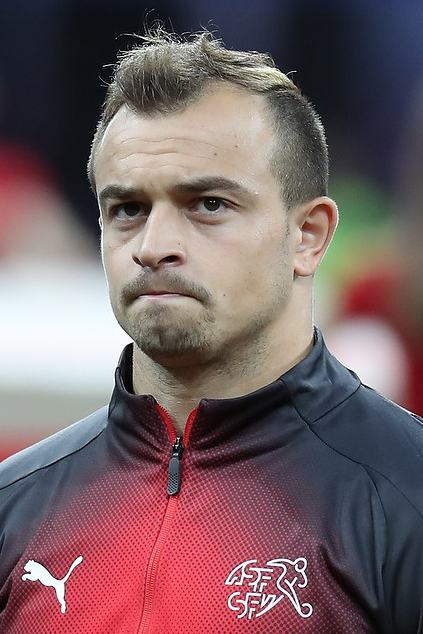
- Shaqiri with Switzerland in 2018

Personal information
- Full name: Xherdan Shaqiri
- Date of birth: 10 October 1991 (age 35)
- Place of birth: Gjilan, SR Serbia, SFR Yugoslavia (present-day Kosovo)
- Height: 1.69 m (5 ft 7 in)
- Positions: Winger; attacking midfielder

Team information
- Current team: FC Basel
- Number: 10

Youth career
- 1999–2001: SV Augst
- 2001–2009: FC Basel

Senior career*
Years	Team	Apps	(Gls)
2007–2009	FC Basel II	19	(8)
2009–2012	FC Basel	92	(18)
2012–2015	Bayern Munich	52	(11)
2015	Inter Milan	15	(1)
2015–2018	Stoke City	84	(15)
2018–2021	Liverpool	45	(7)
2021–2022	Lyon	11	(2)
2022–2024	Chicago Fire	69	(14)
2024–	FC Basel	78	(32)

International career
2007–2008	Switzerland U17	10	(0)
2008–2009	Switzerland U18	5	(0)
2009	Switzerland U19	5	(3)
2009–2011	Switzerland U21	7	(1)
2010–2024	Switzerland	125	(32)
Medal record
Men's football
Representing Switzerland
UEFA European Under-21 Championship
Runner-up	2011
- * Club domestic league appearances and goals as of 22:09, 22 October 2026 (UTC)

Xherdan Shaqiri (Albanian pronunciation: [dʒɛrˈdan ʃaˈciɾi]; born 10 October 1991) is a professional footballer who plays as an attacking midfielder or winger for Swiss Super League club Basel. Born in Kosovo, he represented the Switzerland national team.

Shaqiri rose through the youth ranks at Basel. In his three years playing for the Basel first-team, he was an important player in the team that won three Swiss Super League titles. He moved to Bayern Munich in 2012, where he won three Bundesliga titles in his three seasons at the club. He faced stiff competition at Bayern and did not nail down a first-team spot. In January 2015, he moved to Inter Milan for a fee of €15 million.

After half a season at Inter, Shaqiri moved to Stoke City in the summer of 2015 for a club record £12 million. After Stoke's relegation from the Premier League in 2018, Shaqiri was transferred to Liverpool for a reported £13.5 million fee. He was part of the UEFA Champions League winning squad in his first season. He also won the UEFA Super Cup and the FIFA Club World Cup in 2019, as well as the Premier League in 2020, Liverpool's first league title in 30 years.

A full international from 2010 until 2024, Shaqiri earned 125 caps and scored 32 goals for Switzerland, making him the country's third-most capped player and fourth-highest goalscorer. He represented the nation at four FIFA World Cups (2010, 2014, 2018, 2022), as well as three UEFA European Championships (2016, 2020, 2024).

== Early life ==
Shaqiri was born in Zhegër, Gjilan, SFR Yugoslavia, to Kosovar Albanian parents. He emigrated to Switzerland in 1992 with his parents and three siblings. His brother, Arianit Shaqiri, is a youth football coach. They settled in Augst, a small town in the canton of Basel-Country, near the French and German borders.

His father did not speak Swiss German, so he had to start out washing dishes in a restaurant, before working construction on roads. His mother worked as a cleaner in office buildings in the city, with which he and his brothers helped. His father would send as much money back to Kosovo to other family members as he could, meaning Xherdan and the family did not have extra spending money, except for birthdays. He idolised Brazilian striker Ronaldo, who he said played "like magic".

== Club career ==
=== Basel ===
Shaqiri started his career at hometown club SV Augst, and at the age of eight he was scouted by Basel. Whilst playing for Basel's youth team, he competed in the Under-15 Nike Cup 2007 and was named the best player of the tournament. Despite having several other clubs attempting to sign him, he decided to stay with Basel, where he played for their reserve team from 2007 to 2009 in the Swiss 1. Liga. Two years later, Shaqiri signed his first professional contract with Basel on 2 January 2009, with the new contract keeping him at St. Jakob-Park until December 2011.

Shaqiri made his Basel club debut as a substitute on 12 July 2009 in Basel's 2009–10 season opening match against FC St. Gallen at the AFG Arena. Four months later he scored his first goal for Basel in a 4–1 win over Neuchâtel Xamax at home on 9 November 2009. At the end of the 2009–10 season Shaqiri won the national Double with Basel, and a year later won the league title again.

In December 2011, Shaqiri provided two assists in a match against Manchester United, with Basel winning 2–1. At the end of the 2011–12 season, for the second time in his Basel stint, he won the Double, consisting of the League title, and the Swiss Cup.

=== Bayern Munich ===
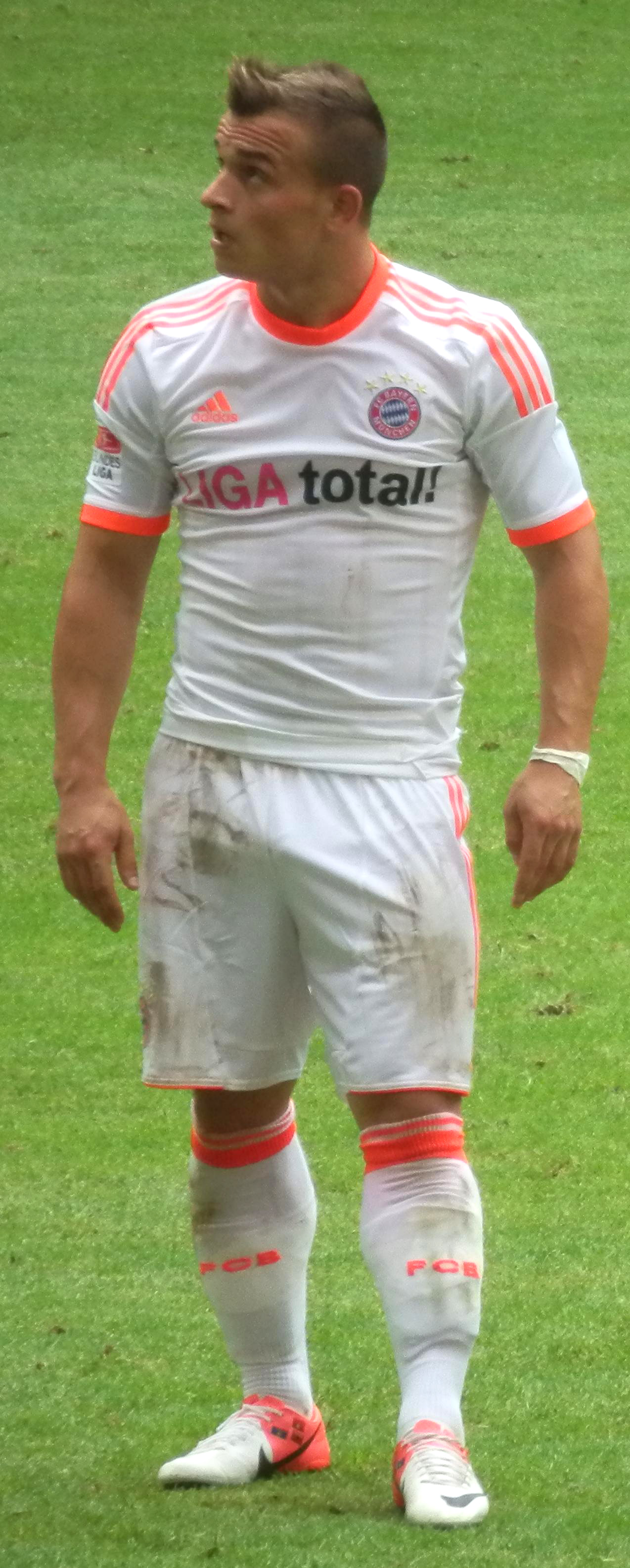
Shaqiri playing for Bayern Munich in 2012

On 9 February 2012, Basel announced that Shaqiri had accepted a transfer to German club Bayern Munich of the Bundesliga for the 2012–13 season. The transfer fee was a reported €11.6 million, with Shaqiri signing a four-year contract with the German club which would last until 30 June 2016, and which paid him around €2 million per season. He faced competition for a place in the midfield from established internationals Franck Ribéry, Arjen Robben, Toni Kroos and Thomas Müller.

On 10 July 2012, Shaqiri made his debut in a 1–0 friendly win against Bavarian neighbours SpVgg Unterhaching. His first competitive appearance for the club came on 20 August in a DFB-Pokal match at SSV Jahn Regensburg, as a half-time substitute. He scored Bayern's second goal as well as providing assists for Mario Mandžukić and Claudio Pizarro, with Bayern winning 4–0. He helped Bayern secure the top spot in their 2012–13 UEFA Champions League group by scoring a goal and providing assists in a 4–1 defeat of BATE Borisov on 5 December, winning the man of the match award and avenging their defeat in Minsk.

Shaqiri did not score his first Bundesliga goal until the final league match of the 2012 calendar year, rescuing a point for them in a 1–1 draw with Borussia Mönchengladbach, leaving Bayern in first place at the winter break. On 16 April 2013, Shaqiri also scored in the DFB-Pokal semi-final against VfL Wolfsburg with a long-range shot. Although he did not play in the final, Shaqiri won the 2012–13 UEFA Champions League title with Bayern, as well as the Bundesliga and the DFB-Pokal title, making him one of the Bayern Munich players to have won the first treble in club history; he added the UEFA Super Cup and FIFA Club World Cup to his achievements that year. By June 2014, Shaqiri was reported to be the most decorated Swiss footballer of all time at just 22, with 13 medals to his name.

=== Inter Milan ===
Shaqiri transferred to Italian club Inter Milan on 9 January 2015 for €15 million, signing a four-and-a-half-year contract, though English club Stoke City had previously declared an interest in signing him. With his previous number of 23 being taken by Andrea Ranocchia, Shaqiri chose the number 91 for his Inter shirt, representing his birth year. He was an unused substitute in Inter's 3–1 victory over Genoa at San Siro. He made his debut for Inter on 17 January, playing in the last 16 minutes as a substitute for fellow new signing Lukas Podolski. Shaqiri made his Coppa Italia debut in a match against Sampdoria in the round of 16 on 22 January, scoring the first goal of the match and helping the team to a 2–0 win to progress into the quarter-finals.

Shaqiri scored his first Serie A goal on 15 February 2015 in a 4–1 away win against Atalanta. Four days later, he registered his first European tournament goal for Inter, scoring the opener from a Zdravko Kuzmanović assist in a 3–3 UEFA Europa League draw away to Celtic.

=== Stoke City ===
That is the best goal I have seen this season. He knew exactly what he was doing, it is absolutely sublime.

— Garth Crooks, pundit on the BBC's Final Score, describing Shaqiri's second goal for Stoke against Everton on 28 December 2015.

In July 2015, Stoke agreed a £12 million fee to sign Shaqiri, but the deal fell through when he did not agree to the move before a deadline imposed by the club. The deal was revived a month later, however, with Shaqiri agreeing to personal terms and undergoing medicals. Everton had also expressed interest in him but only wanted a loan deal, while Inter preferred a permanent move. On 11 August, Shaqiri completed his move to Stoke for a club-record fee of £12 million (€14.5 million), on a five-year deal.

He made his debut eleven days later in a 1–1 draw with Norwich City at Carrow Road, assisting Mame Biram Diouf's headed goal with a free kick. On 28 December, Shaqiri recorded his first goals for Stoke, a first-half brace in a 4–3 win at Everton. The second of these two goals was a half-volley over Tim Howard, from Bojan's pass. His only other goal in 2015–16 was a 20-yard strike against Newcastle United on 2 March 2016. In total Shaqiri played 32 times for Stoke in 2015–16 as the side finished in ninth position.

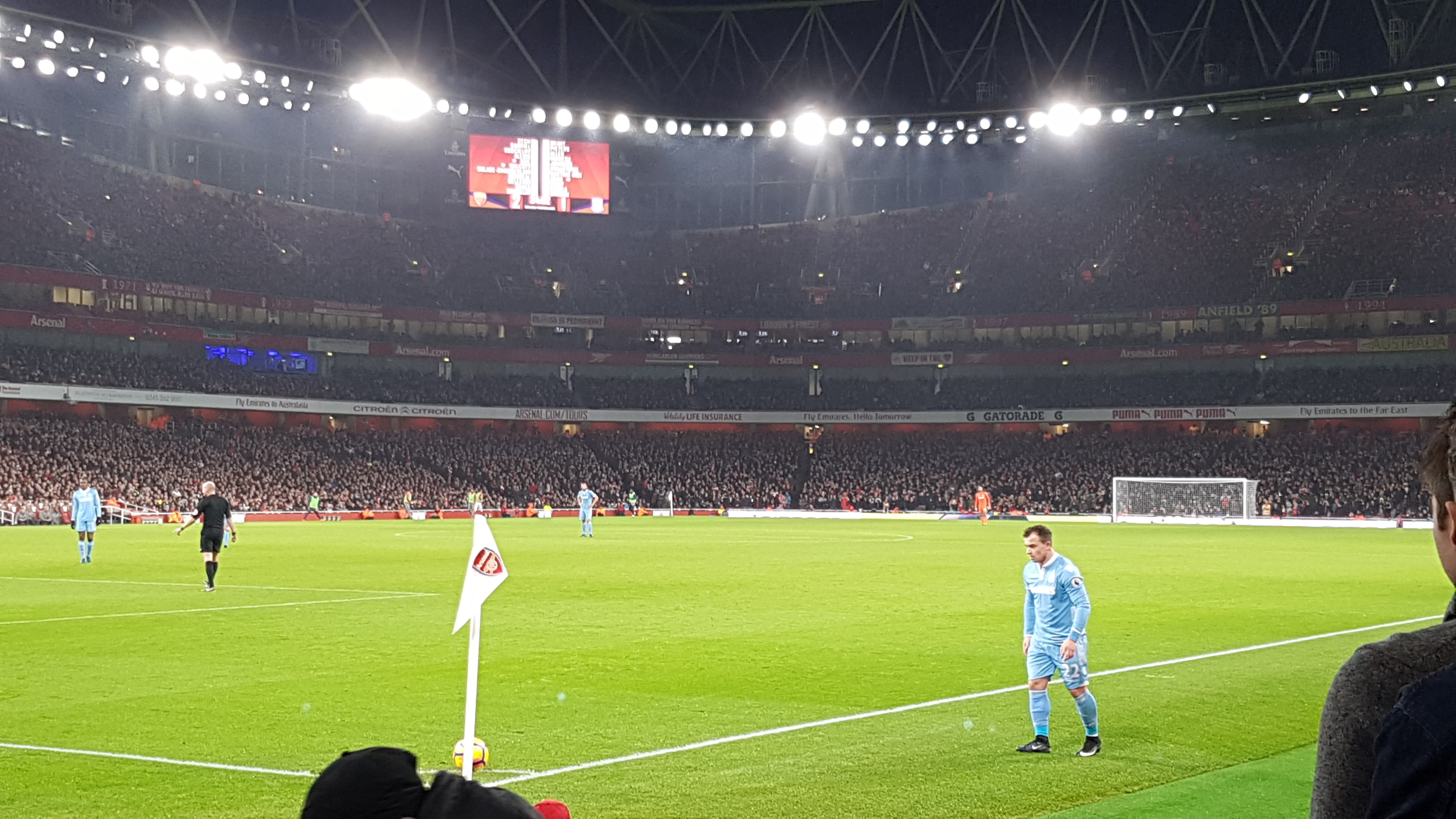
Shaqiri preparing to take a corner kick for Stoke City in 2016

Shaqiri scored a 20-yard free kick against Middlesbrough on the opening day of the 2016–17 season. However a calf injury ruled him out for the next six weeks, returning to the side on 24 September 2016 against West Bromwich Albion where he provided the assist for Joe Allen in a 1–1 draw. Shaqiri scored two long-range goals against Hull City on 22 October 2016, becoming the first Stoke player to do so in a Premier League game. He scored another long range strike also against Hull on 15 April 2017 which was named as Stoke's goal of the season. Shaqiri made 22 appearances in 2016–17, as Stoke finished in 13th position.

Shaqiri scored his first goal of the 2017–18 season in the match against Newcastle United, on 16 September, scoring the equalising goal in an eventual 1–2 defeat. On 4 November, he scored in a 2–2 draw against Leicester City. On 25 November, he scored in a 1–2 defeat to Crystal Palace. On 2 December, he scored in a 2–1 win over Swansea City. On 3 February 2018, he scored the opening goal in a 1–2 defeat to AFC Bournemouth. A week later, on 10 February, he scored in a 1–1 draw against Brighton & Hove Albion. On 24 February, Shaqiri scored for a third consecutive game in a 1–1 draw against Leicester City. In March 2018, with Stoke battling against relegation, Shaqiri courted controversy with an interview for Swiss magazine Schweizer Illustrierte in which he said there was a "lack of quality" in his Stoke teammates and that even the presence of Ronaldinho would not improve the team. On 5 May, Shaqiri scored in a 1–2 defeat to Crystal Palace, as Stoke were relegated to the Championship. He played 38 times for the club in the season and finished as top goalscorer for the club with 8 goals, also providing 7 assists.

=== Liverpool ===
On 13 July 2018, Liverpool signed Shaqiri on a five-year deal after triggering his £13.5 million release clause. On his debut on 12 August, in the opening match of the season against West Ham United, he came on as a late substitute in a 4–0 win. He made his first full start on 22 September, in a 3–0 win over Southampton, and received praise for his performance which earned him the BBC Sport man of the match award.

Shaqiri scored his first goal for Liverpool on 27 October, scoring the third goal in a 4–1 win over Cardiff City. In November, he was left out of the club's Champions League trip to Red Star Belgrade in Serbia to avoid controversy over his pro-Albanian views. The following month, during the North West derby, Shaqiri scored twice after coming on as a substitute to guide Liverpool to a 3–1 win which saw the club record a league victory over Manchester United for the first time since March 2014.

On 1 June 2019, Shaqiri picked up his second Champions League winner's medal, despite not playing in the final against Tottenham Hotspur, which Liverpool won 2–0, but having played a key role in the semi-final against Barcelona. He later said he wanted to stay at Anfield. On 14 August, Shaqiri picked up his second trophy with the club, winning the UEFA Super Cup against Chelsea on penalties after a 2–2 regular finish. On 4 December, following a prolonged injury, Shaqiri scored his first goal of the 2019–20 season in the derby against Everton, slotting home Liverpool's second in a 5–2 win. In December, he was part of the squad that won the 2019 FIFA Club World Cup, following a 1–0 victory over Flamengo in the final. In June 2020, Liverpool were crowned Premier League champions, and Shaqiri received a medal as he made the required number of appearances for one.

Shaqiri's first goal of the 2020–21 season, and first goal for the club in over nine months, came on 24 September 2020, when he scored the opening goal in a 7–2 routing of Lincoln City in the EFL Cup.

=== Lyon ===
On 23 August 2021, French side Lyon announced the signing of Shaqiri, paying Liverpool a fee of €6 million and signing a contract until 2024. Less than six months later, having been involved in just half of their Ligue 1 matches during the campaign and started only nine times, it was reported that he could return to Switzerland and join FC Sion. Sion's president, Christian Constantin said: "Shaqiri, lacking playing time in Lyon, wanted to meet. In anticipation of the World Cup, he was looking for a club where he would have more playing time."

=== Chicago Fire ===
On 9 February 2022, Shaqiri joined Major League Soccer club Chicago Fire on a contract that was to run through the 2024 season as a Designated Player. His transfer signing was the most expensive in Chicago Fire history, for a reported fee of €6.5 million (US$7.5 million). The transfer reunited him with Georg Heitz, Chicago Fire's sporting director, who previously worked at FC Basel early in Shaqiri's career.

On 14 August 2024, the Fire and Shaqiri mutually agreed to terminate his contract. The separation was officially amicable, with Shaqiri explaining that he felt it was the "right time" to "explore new opportunities".

=== Return to Basel ===
On 16 August 2024, two days after leaving the Chicago Fire, Shaqiri returned to FC Basel, rejoining on a three-year contract. He helped Basel win their first league title since 2017 by scoring 18 goals and providing 20 assists during the 2024–25 season.

== International career ==
=== Youth career and early senior career ===
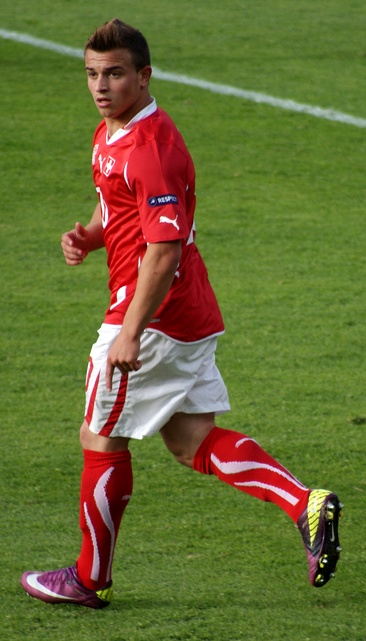
Shaqiri playing for Switzerland under-21s at the 2011 UEFA European Under-21 Championship

Shaqiri made his debut for Switzerland under-21s on 11 November 2009 in a 3–1 win against Turkey in a 2011 UEFA European Under-21 Championship qualifier. He scored his first goal for them on 11 June 2011 in the 2011 UEFA European Under-21 Championship opening game against Denmark.

Shaqiri was promoted to the Switzerland senior team in 2010, making his debut on 3 March 2010 in a 3–1 friendly loss against Uruguay. He was included in the 2010 FIFA World Cup squad, after receiving a surprise call-up from manager Ottmar Hitzfeld. Shaqiri scored his first goal for them on 7 September 2010, a long range left-footed shot, in a 1–3 loss against England in a Euro 2012 qualifier. He netted a hat-trick in another Euro 2012 qualifier on 6 September 2011, as Switzerland came from behind to beat Bulgaria 3–1. Switzerland also tried to select him to participate in the 2012 Olympic Football tournament, but he opted to stay at his new club for pre-season training.

=== 2014 FIFA World Cup ===
On 11 September 2012, Shaqiri did not sing the Swiss national anthem in a World Cup qualifier against his ancestral Albania in Lucerne, and did not celebrate when he scored the opening goal of a 2–0 win. He wore boots with the flags of Kosovo, Albania and Switzerland for the match.

In June 2014, Shaqiri was named in Switzerland's squad for the 2014 FIFA World Cup. In the team's opening match, Shaqiri was named man of the match by FIFA as the Nati defeated Ecuador. He earned the same title ten days later in Switzerland's third group match, for scoring a hat-trick against Honduras, which included a bending strike from 30 yards, and ensuring Switzerland a spot in the knockout stage. They were eliminated following a 1–0 loss against Argentina in the last 16.

=== UEFA Euro 2016 ===
Shaqiri scored three times in Switzerland's successful qualification campaign for UEFA Euro 2016, with all of his strikes coming against Lithuania. He recorded a brace on 15 November 2014 in a 4–0 win over them in St. Gallen, and in the reverse fixture the following 14 June, he netted an 84th-minute winner in a 2–1 victory. In the final tournament in France, he started all four of Switzerland's matches as they reached the last 16, equalising with a bicycle kick from the edge of the penalty area as they drew 1–1 with Poland in Saint-Étienne; he scored again in the penalty shootout but the Poles won nonetheless.

Following Switzerland's first game at Euro 2016, Shaqiri declared he would switch allegiance to Kosovo if their manager would make him captain, in reaction to Switzerland manager Vladimir Petković's decision to omit him from that position. Although already an international for Switzerland, FIFA rules would permit Shaqiri to represent Kosovo, who joined the federation earlier that year. However, since Shaqiri continued to play for Switzerland after Kosovo had become a member of FIFA, it also ruled out the possibility of Shaqiri's eligibility to Kosovo.

=== 2018 FIFA World Cup ===
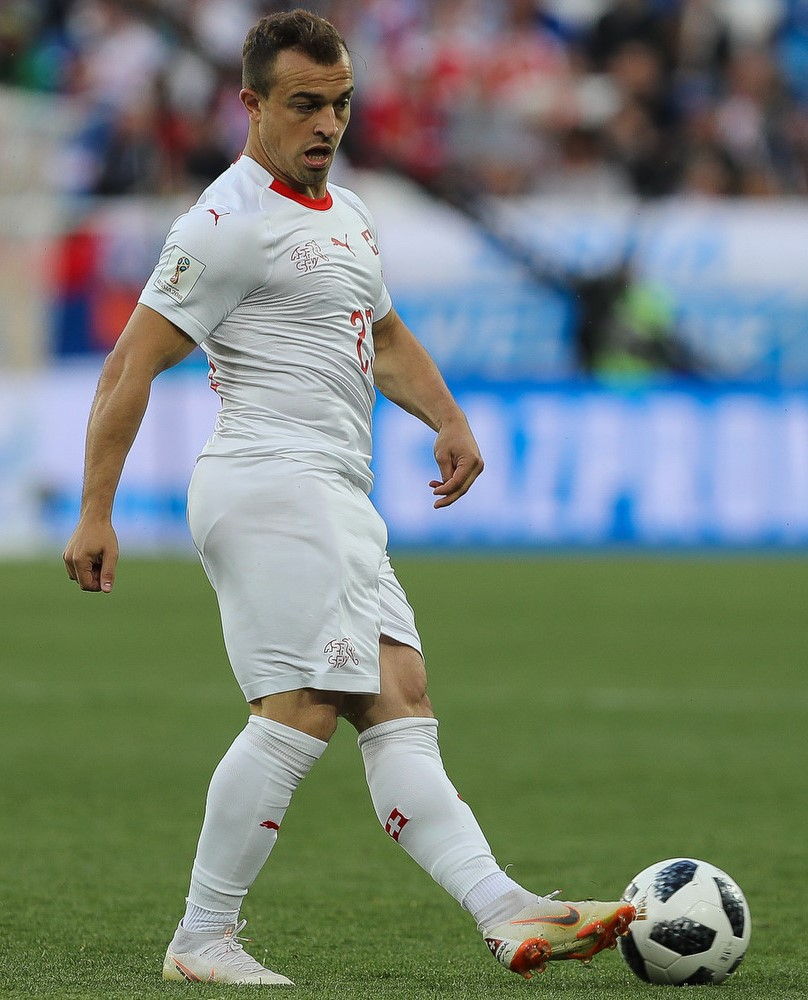
Shaqiri playing for Switzerland at the 2018 FIFA World Cup

Shaqiri was included in Switzerland's 23-man squad for the 2018 FIFA World Cup, held in Russia. In the group stage, he scored the winning goal as Switzerland came from behind to defeat Serbia 2–1. He and fellow goalscorer Granit Xhaka, who is also of Kosovar descent, celebrated their goals by making an eagle gesture, a symbol of ethnic Albanians. Switzerland captain Stephan Lichtsteiner, who is not of Albanian origin, did the same gesture to celebrate Shaqiri's goal, and defended both players after the match. FIFA fined Xhaka and Shaqiri 10,000 Swiss francs "for unsporting behaviour contrary to the principles of fair-play", while Lichtsteiner paid 5,000 Swiss francs. Additionally, with the goal he equalled Stéphane Chapuisat's tally of 21 in internationals and entered Switzerland's top ten scorers of all time.

Shaqiri was part of Switzerland's squad at the 2019 UEFA Nations League Finals in Portugal. He was named in the Team of the Tournament.

=== UEFA Euro 2020 ===
Shaqiri was named in the 26-man Swiss squad for the postponed UEFA Euro 2020. On 20 June 2021, he scored twice in the 26th and 68th minutes against Turkey in a group stage match. On 2 July 2021, he scored in the quarter final of the tournament against Spain. The match ended 1–1 and went to a penalty shoot-out, in which Spain progressed to the semi-finals.

=== 2022 FIFA World Cup ===
On 15 November 2021, Shaqiri became only the fifth Swiss player to reach 100 caps when he started Switzerland's final 2022 World Cup qualifier against Bulgaria.

On 9 November 2022, he was called up for the 2022 FIFA World Cup in Qatar. On 2 December, he scored the first goal in a 3–2 victory over Serbia, contributing to his country's qualification to the knockout stage.

=== UEFA Euro 2024 ===
On 7 June 2024, Shaqiri was selected in the 26-man squad for the UEFA Euro 2024. On 19 June, he scored a goal in a 1–1 draw against Scotland, becoming the first player to score in the competition while playing for a club from either North or South America. He is also the first player to score at the last six major international championships, (2014 World Cup, Euro 2016, 2018 World Cup, Euro 2020, 2022 World Cup, Euro 2024)

On 15 July 2024, Shaqiri announced his retirement from the national team, having made 125 appearances and scored 32 goals.

== Style of play ==
Shaqiri primarily plays as a right winger and FIFA's official website describes him as "unpredictable on the ball, adept with both feet, clinical in front of goal and possessing excellent vision." He was described in The Daily Telegraph as "stocky and powerful" with a "wand of a left foot". He is nicknamed "the Alpine Messi" and "the magic dwarf".

Also capable of playing as an attacking midfielder, a 2011 scouting profile by Jamie Sanderson of The Independent described Shaqiri in the following words: "Diminutive, agile and pacy across the turf, Shaqiri boasts excellent technique and balance. He's left footed, but comfortable and equally effective on either wing or as a classic play-maker, boasting good vision and almost zero back lift in his passing and shooting." He also added that Shaqiri's "tricks," "direct running style," and "composure," made him "a player who's dangerous in almost any attacking area." However, while he acknowledged the young winger's promising talent and potential to become a top player, he also noted that he had a poor work rate and lacked maturity.

== Personal life ==
Shaqiri is a Muslim but celebrates Christmas, despite it being a mainly Christian holiday. This is due to his family who celebrated it in his childhood. In 2014, he cited the Christmas tree as the reason for it, saying "So we don't celebrate it so much, but my little sister loves to have a Christmas tree, so we always get one of those." Shaqiri was chosen to be on the cover of the FIFA video game FIFA 15 in Switzerland next to Lionel Messi. Shaqiri is sponsored by sportswear and equipment supplier Nike. He wears Nike Mercurial Vapor boots, and at the 2018 World Cup he had the flags of Switzerland and Kosovo embroidered on each heel.

== Career statistics ==
=== Club ===
As of match played 16 October 2026

Appearances and goals by club, season and competition
Club	Season	League			National cup (Note: Includes Swiss Cup, DFB-Pokal, Coppa Italia, FA Cup, U.S. Open Cup)		League cup (Note: Includes Football League/EFL Cup)		Continental		Other		Total	
Club	Season	Division	Apps	Goals	Apps	Goals	Apps	Goals	Apps	Goals	Apps	Goals	Apps	Goals
Basel II	2007–08	Swiss 1. Liga	2	0	—		—		—		—		2	0
Basel II	2008–09	Swiss 1. Liga	17	8	—		—		—		—		17	8
Basel II	Total		19	8	—		—		—		—		19	8
Basel	2009–10	Swiss Super League	32	4	5	1	—		10 (Note: Appearance(s) in UEFA Europa League)	2	—		47	7
Basel	2010–11	Swiss Super League	29	5	2	0	—		11 (Note: Ten appearances and two goals in UEFA Champions League, one appearance in UEFA Europa League)	2	—		42	7
Basel	2011–12	Swiss Super League	31	9	4	0	—		6 (Note: Appearance(s) in UEFA Champions League)	0	—		41	9
Basel	Total		92	18	11	1	—		27	4	—		130	23
Bayern Munich	2012–13	Bundesliga	26	4	5	3	—		7	1	1 (Note: Appearance in DFL-Supercup)	0	39	8
Bayern Munich	2013–14	Bundesliga	17	6	3	1	—		4 (Note: Three appearances in UEFA Champions League, one appearance in UEFA Super Cup)	0	3 (Note: One appearance in DFL-Supercup, two appearances in FIFA Club World Cup)	0	27	7
Bayern Munich	2014–15	Bundesliga	9	1	1	0	—		4	1	1	0	15	2
Bayern Munich	Total		52	11	9	4	—		15	2	5	0	81	17
Inter Milan	2014–15	Serie A	15	1	2	1	—		3	1	—		20	3
Stoke City	2015–16	Premier League	27	3	1	0	4	0	—		—		32	3
Stoke City	2016–17	Premier League	21	4	1	0	0	0	—		—		22	4
Stoke City	2017–18	Premier League	36	8	1	0	1	0	—		—		38	8
Stoke City	Total		84	15	3	0	5	0	—		—		92	15
Liverpool	2018–19	Premier League	24	6	1	0	1	0	4	0	—		30	6
Liverpool	2019–20	Premier League	7	1	0	0	0	0	1	0	3 (Note: One appearance in FA Community Shield, two appearances in FIFA Club World Cup)	0	11	1
Liverpool	2020–21	Premier League	14	0	2	0	1	1	5	0	0	0	22	1
Liverpool	Total		45	7	3	0	2	1	10	0	3	0	63	8
Lyon	2021–22	Ligue 1	11	2	0	0	—		5	0	—		16	2
Chicago Fire	2022	MLS	29	7	0	0	—		—		—		29	7
Chicago Fire	2023	MLS	28	5	3	0	—		—		3 (Note: Appearances in Leagues Cup)	2	34	7
Chicago Fire	2024	MLS	12	2	—		—		—		—		12	2
Chicago Fire	Total		69	14	3	0	—		—		3	2	75	16
Basel	2024–25	Swiss Super League	34	18	5	3	—		—		—		39	21
Basel	2025–26	Swiss Super League	34	11	3	1	—		10 (Note: Two appearances and one goal in UEFA Champions League, eight appearances and three goals in UEFA Europa League)	4	—		47	16
Basel	2026–27	Swiss Super League	10	3	1	0	—		—		—		11	3
Basel	Total		78	32	9	4	—		10	4	—		97	40
Career total			465	108	40	10	7	1	70	11	11	2	592	133

=== International ===
Appearances and goals by national team and year
National team	Year	Apps	Goals
Switzerland	2010	9	1
Switzerland	2011	8	3
Switzerland	2012	7	3
Switzerland	2013	6	1
Switzerland	2014	12	7
Switzerland	2015	9	2
Switzerland	2016	8	1
Switzerland	2017	9	2
Switzerland	2018	12	2
Switzerland	2019	2	0
Switzerland	2020	4	0
Switzerland	2021	14	4
Switzerland	2022	12	1
Switzerland	2023	7	2
Switzerland	2024	6	3
Total		125	32

Switzerland score listed first, score column indicates score after each Shaqiri goal.

List of international goals scored by Xherdan Shaqiri
No.	Date	Venue	Cap	Opponent	Score	Result	Competition	Ref.
1	7 September 2010	St. Jakob-Park, Basel, Switzerland	7	England	1–2	1–3	UEFA Euro 2012 qualifying	
2	6 September 2011	St. Jakob-Park, Basel, Switzerland	13	Bulgaria	1–1	3–1	UEFA Euro 2012 qualifying	
3	6 September 2011	St. Jakob-Park, Basel, Switzerland	13	Bulgaria	2–1	3–1	UEFA Euro 2012 qualifying	
4	6 September 2011	St. Jakob-Park, Basel, Switzerland	13	Bulgaria	3–1	3–1	UEFA Euro 2012 qualifying	
5	29 February 2012	Stade de Suisse, Bern, Switzerland	18	Argentina	1–1	1–3	Friendly	
6	11 September 2012	Swissporarena, Lucerne, Switzerland	21	Albania	2–0	2–0	2014 FIFA World Cup qualification	
7	14 November 2012	Stade Olympique de Sousse, Sousse, Tunisia	24	Tunisia	2–1	2–1	Friendly	
8	11 October 2013	Qemal Stafa Stadium, Tirana, Albania	30	Albania	1–0	2–1	2014 FIFA World Cup qualification	
9	3 June 2014	Swissporarena, Lucerne, Switzerland	33	Peru	2–0	2–0	Friendly	
10	25 June 2014	Arena da Amazônia, Manaus, Brazil	36	Honduras	1–0	3–0	2014 FIFA World Cup	
11	25 June 2014	Arena da Amazônia, Manaus, Brazil	36	Honduras	2–0	3–0	2014 FIFA World Cup	
12	25 June 2014	Arena da Amazônia, Manaus, Brazil	36	Honduras	3–0	3–0	2014 FIFA World Cup	
13	14 October 2014	San Marino Stadium, Serravalle, San Marino	40	San Marino	4–0	4–0	UEFA Euro 2016 qualifying	
14	15 November 2014	AFG Arena, St. Gallen, Switzerland	41	Lithuania	3–0	4–0	UEFA Euro 2016 qualifying	
15	15 November 2014	AFG Arena, St. Gallen, Switzerland	41	Lithuania	4–0	4–0	UEFA Euro 2016 qualifying	
16	10 June 2015	Stockhorn Arena, Thun, Switzerland	45	Liechtenstein	2–0	3–0	Friendly	
17	14 June 2015	LFF Stadium, Vilnius, Lithuania	46	Lithuania	2–1	2–1	UEFA Euro 2016 qualifying	
18	25 June 2016	Stade Geoffroy-Guichard, Saint-Étienne, France	57	Poland	1–1	1–1 (a.e.t.)	UEFA Euro 2016	
19	1 June 2017	Stade de la Maladière, Neuchâtel, Switzerland	61	Belarus	1–0	1–0	Friendly	
20	9 June 2017	Tórsvøllur, Tórshavn, Faroe Islands	62	Faroe Islands	2–0	2–0	2018 FIFA World Cup qualification	
21	22 June 2018	Kaliningrad Stadium, Kaliningrad, Russia	72	Serbia	2–1	2–1	2018 FIFA World Cup	
22	8 September 2018	Kybunpark, St. Gallen, Switzerland	75	Iceland	3–0	6–0	2018–19 UEFA Nations League A	
23	28 March 2021	Kybunpark, St. Gallen, Switzerland	88	Lithuania	1–0	1–0	2022 FIFA World Cup qualification	
24	20 June 2021	Olympic Stadium, Baku, Azerbaijan	94	Turkey	2–0	3–1	UEFA Euro 2020	
25	20 June 2021	Olympic Stadium, Baku, Azerbaijan	94	Turkey	3–1	3–1	UEFA Euro 2020	
26	2 July 2021	Krestovsky Stadium, Saint Petersburg, Russia	96	Spain	1–1	1–1 (a.e.t.)	UEFA Euro 2020	
27	2 December 2022	Stadium 974, Doha, Qatar	111	Serbia	1–0	3–2	2022 FIFA World Cup	
28	12 September 2023	Stade de Tourbillon, Sion, Switzerland	116	Andorra	3–0	3–0	UEFA Euro 2024 qualifying	
29	15 October 2023	Kybunpark, St. Gallen, Switzerland	117	Belarus	1–0	3–3	UEFA Euro 2024 qualifying	
30	26 March 2024	Aviva Stadium, Dublin, Ireland	121	Republic of Ireland	1–0	1–0	Friendly	
31	4 June 2024	Swissporarena, Lucerne, Switzerland	122	Estonia	4–0	4–0	Friendly	
32	19 June 2024	RheinEnergieStadion, Cologne, Germany	124	Scotland	1–1	1–1	UEFA Euro 2024	

== Honours ==
Basel

- Swiss Super League: 2009–10, 2010–11, 2011–12, 2024–25
- Swiss Cup: 2009–10, 2011–12, 2024–25

Bayern Munich

- Bundesliga: 2012–13, 2013–14, 2014–15
- DFB-Pokal: 2012–13, 2013–14
- DFL-Supercup: 2012
- UEFA Champions League: 2012–13
- UEFA Super Cup: 2013
- FIFA Club World Cup: 2013

Liverpool

- Premier League: 2019–20
- UEFA Champions League: 2018–19
- UEFA Super Cup: 2019
- FIFA Club World Cup: 2019

Switzerland U21

- UEFA European Under-21 Championship runner-up: 2011

Individual

- Swiss Footballer of the Year: 2011, 2012
- Swiss Golden Player Award "SFAP Golden Player": 2012
- Swiss Golden Player Award "Best Young Player": 2012
- UEFA European Championship Goal of the Tournament: 2016
- UEFA Nations League Finals Team of the Tournament: 2019
- Swiss Super League top scorer: 2024–25

== See also ==
- List of men's footballers with 100 or more international caps
- List of FIFA World Cup top goalscorers
