= Kevin Carlos =

Spanish footballer (born 2001)

Personal information
- Full name: Kevin Carlos Omoruyi Benjamin
- Date of birth: 10 April 2001 (age 25)
- Place of birth: Ceuta, Spain
- Height: 1.88 m (6 ft 2 in)
- Position: Forward

Team information
- Current team: Cagliari (on loan from Nice)
- Number: 9

Youth career
- Huesca

Senior career*
Years	Team	Apps	(Gls)
2018–2019	Almudévar	5	(2)
2020–2023	Huesca B	53	(24)
2020–2024	Huesca	12	(1)
2023	→ Betis B (loan)	10	(0)
2023–2024	→ Yverdon-Sport (loan)	17	(3)
2024	Yverdon-Sport	21	(12)
2024–2025	Basel	36	(13)
2025–	Nice	23	(0)
2026–	→ Cagliari (loan)	5	(0)
- * Club domestic league appearances and goals as of 24 October 2026

Kevin Carlos Omoruyi Benjamin (born 10 April 2001), known as Kevin Carlos, is a Spanish professional footballer who plays as a forward for Serie A club Cagliari, on loan from Ligue 1 club Nice.

== Club career ==
Born in Ceuta to a Spanish mother and a Nigerian father, Kevin Carlos was a SD Huesca youth graduate. He made his senior debut with farm team AD Almudévar on 2 September 2018, starting and scoring the opener in a 2–2 Tercera División away draw against Atlético Monzón.

In 2019, Kevin Carlos returned to the youth categories after the partnership with Almudévar ended, and spent the season playing for the Juvenil A team. For the 2020–21 campaign, he was assigned to the reserves, now also in the fourth level, and renewed his contract until 2023 on 28 July 2020.

Kevin Carlos made his first team debut on 15 December 2020, coming on as an extra-time substitute for goalscorer Rafa Mir in a 3–2 away win over CD Marchamalo, for the season's Copa del Rey. He scored his first goal for the main squad on 30 November of the following year, netting the second of a 2–0 success at CD Cayón, also for the national cup.

Kevin Carlos' professional debut occurred on 14 December 2021, as he started in a 0–1 home loss against Girona FC, also for the Copa del Rey. He scored his first professional goal the following 4 September, netting the opener in a 3–0 Segunda División home win over UD Ibiza.

On 12 January 2023, Kevin Carlos joined Betis Deportivo on loan until the end of the season with an option to purchase. On 15 July, he moved abroad for the first time in his career, after agreeing to a one-year loan deal with Swiss side Yverdon-Sport FC; the following 3 January, he signed a permanent contract with the club.

On 23 August 2024, Kevin Carlos joined FC Basel on a four-year contract.

On 18 August 2025, Kevin Carlos signed with Nice in France.

== Career statistics ==
As of match played 26 May 2026

Appearances and goals by club, season and competition
Club	Season	League			National cup		Europe		Other		Total	
Club	Season	Division	Apps	Goals	Apps	Goals	Apps	Goals	Apps	Goals	Apps	Goals
Almudévar	2018–19	Tercera División	5	0	—		—		—		5	0
Huesca B	2020–21	Tercera División	25	8	—		—		2 (Note: Appearances in Tercera División promotion play-offs)	3	27	11
Huesca B	2021–22	Segunda Federación	28	16	—		—		—		28	16
Huesca B	Total		53	24	—		—		2	3	55	27
Huesca	2020–21	Segunda División	0	0	1	0	—		—		1	0
Huesca	2021–22	Segunda División	1	0	2	1	—		—		3	1
Huesca	2022–23	Segunda División	11	1	1	0	—		—		12	1
Huesca	Total		12	1	4	1	—		—		16	2
Betis B (loan)	2022–23	Segunda Federación	10	0	—		—		—		10	0
Yverdon-Sport (loan)	2023–24	Swiss Super League	17	3	1	0	—		—		18	3
Yverdon-Sport	2024–25	Swiss Super League	21	12	1	0	—		—		22	12
Basel	2024–25	Swiss Super League	32	12	4	2	—		—		36	14
Basel	2025–26	Swiss Super League	4	1	0	0	—		—		4	1
Basel	Total		36	13	4	2	—		—		40	15
Nice	2025–26	Ligue 1	23	0	3	0	8 (Note: Appearances in UEFA Europa League)	2	1 (Note: Appearance in Ligue 1 relegation/promotion play-offs)	0	35	2
Career total			177	47	13	3	8	2	3	3	201	61

== Honours ==
Basel

- Swiss Super League: 2024–25

Nice

- Coupe de France runner-up: 2025–26
