= Hamza Abdallah =

Footballer (born 2003)

Personal information
- Date of birth: 13 June 2003 (age 23)
- Place of birth: Paris, France
- Height: 1.77 m (5 ft 10 in)
- Position: Right-back

Team information
- Current team: Lausanne-Sport
- Number: 20

Youth career
- 2011: OFC Courcouronnes
- 2011–2018: Paris FC
- 2018–2022: Lens

Senior career*
Years	Team	Apps	(Gls)
2022–	Lausanne-Sport U21	32	(4)
2023–	Lausanne-Sport	13	(0)
2024	→ Nyon (loan)	15	(2)
2025	→ SLO (loan)	5	(0)

International career^{‡}
2019	France U16	4	(0)
2025–	Comoros	5	(0)
- * Club domestic league appearances and goals as of 28 September 2026 ‡ National team caps and goals as of 22:00, 16 November 2025 (UTC)

Hamza Abdallah (born 13 June 2003) is a professional footballer who plays as a right-back for the Swiss Super League club Lausanne-Sport. Born in France, he plays for the Comoros national team.

== Club career ==
Abdallah is a product of the youth academies of the French clubs OFC Courcouronnes, Paris FC and Lens. On 8 September 2022, he joined the Swiss club Lausanne-Sport and was assigned to their U21 team. On 1 November 2023, he made his senior and professional debut with Lausanne-Sport in a 4–0 Swiss Cup loss to FC Lugano on 1 November 2023. On 3 January 2024, he joined Stade Nyonnais on loan for the second half of the 2023–24 season. On 20 June 2024, he extended his contract with Lausanne-Sport until 2027. He joined StadeLO on loan for the second half of the 2024–25 season on 18 February 2025.

== International career ==
Born in France, Abdallah is of Comorian descent and holds dual French-Comorian citizenship. In 2019, he made friendly appearances for the France U16s. In November 2025, he was called up to the Comoros national team for a set of friendlies. He debuted in a friendly 1–0 win over Namibia on 14 November 2025.
