= Adriano Onyegbule =

German footballer (born 2006)

Personal information
- Full name: Brian Adriano Ogechukwu Onyegbule
- Date of birth: 23 June 2006 (age 20)
- Place of birth: Würzburg, Germany
- Height: 1.84 m (6 ft 0 in)
- Position: Midfielder

Team information
- Current team: Basel U-21

Youth career
- –2022: RB Leipzig

Senior career*
Years	Team	Apps	(Gls)
2022–	Basel U-21	46	(4)
2022–	Basel	2	(0)
2024	→ Schaffhausen (loan)	10	(1)
2025	→ Vaduz (loan)	3	(0)

International career^{‡}
2021–2022	Germany U16	4	(0)
2022	Germany U17	2	(0)
- * Club domestic league appearances and goals as of 8 August 2026 ‡ National team caps and goals as of 28 March 2023

Brian Adriano Ogechukwu Onyegbule (born 23 June 2006) is a German professional footballer who plays as midfielder for Swiss Promotion League side Basel U-21.

== Club career ==
Onyegbule played his youth football with RB Leipzig, advancing through the ranks to their U-17 team.

At the beginning of June 2022 Onyegbule was invited to join Basel during their pre-season trials. He played in a test game in the Youth Campus Basel against Xamax on 18 June and with his play and his goal in the 43rd minute he impressed and the club offered him a three-year contract, which he signed on the day after his 16th birthday. Following the trainings camp in Gmund am Tegernsee, Onyegbule then joined Basel's U-21 team under coach Ognjen Zaric and played in the team regularly in the Promotion League, the third tier of Swiss football. During the winter break of the 2022–23 League season he advanced to the first team, under head coach Alexander Frei and later, interims coach Heiko Vogel.

After playing in seven test games, Onyegbul played his domestic league debut for Basel's first team in the away game in the Kybunpark on 14 May 2023, coming on as substitute in the 60th minute, as they were defeated 6–1 by St. Gallen.

On 31 July 2024, Onyegbule moved on loan to Schaffhausen. On 3 January 2025, he was recalled from the Schaffhausen loan and moved on loan to Vaduz for the remainder of the season.

== International career ==
Born in Germany, Onyegbule is of Nigerian descent. He represented Germany four times at U-16 level. He played his debut in the German U-16 team on 2 September 2021 against Austria, as the two teams played a 3–3 draw. He has also represented them at U-17 level, playing his debut on 25 November 2022 against the Turkish U-17 team, as they played a 2–2 draw.

== Sources ==
- Verein "Basler Fussballarchiv" Homepage
- Profil on FCB website
- Profil on SFL website
