= Franck Koré =

French footballer (born 1995)

Personal information
- Full name: Franck Etienne Samuel Koré
- Date of birth: 16 May 1995 (age 31)
- Place of birth: Abidjan, Ivory Coast
- Height: 1.87 m (6 ft 2 in)
- Position: Forward

Team information
- Current team: RSC Habay-la-Neuve
- Number: 23

Youth career
- 2002–2006: L. Rariche Tours
- 2006–2013: Tours

Senior career*
Years	Team	Apps	(Gls)
2013–2015	Tours II	21	(3)
2015–2016	Drancy	2	(0)
2016	Septemvri Simitli	9	(3)
2017–2018	Rebecq	10	(5)
2018–2021	Virton	47	(16)
2021–2022	Swift Hesperange	7	(1)
2022–2023	Lausanne Ouchy	6	(0)
2023	→ Stade Nyonnais (loan)	13	(7)
2023–2025	Stade Nyonnais	49	(7)
2025–	RSC Habay-la-Neuve	14	(2)

International career
2013	France U19	2	(0)
- * Club domestic league appearances and goals as of 28 June 2026

Franck Etienne Samuel Koré (born 16 May 1995) is a French professional footballer who plays as a forward for RSC Habay-la-Neuve.

== Career ==
Kore started his senior career with Tours. After that, he played for JA Drancy, Septemvri Simitli, and R.U.S. Rebecquoise. In 2018, he signed for R.E. Virton in the Belgian First Division B, where he has made forty-seven appearances and scored sixteen goals.

On 19 July 2021, he signed with Luxembourger club Swift Hesperange.
