= Bénie Traoré =

Ivorian footballer (born 2002)

- Traore with New York City FC in 2026

Personal information
- Full name: Bénie Adama Traoré
- Date of birth: 30 November 2002 (age 23)
- Place of birth: Ouragahio, Ivory Coast
- Height: 1.72 m (5 ft 8 in)
- Positions: Forward; winger

Team information
- Current team: New York City FC
- Number: 9

Youth career
- 2019–2021: ASEC Mimosas

Senior career*
| Years | Team | Apps | (Gls) |
| 2021–2023 | Häcken | 41 | (15) |
| 2023–2024 | Sheffield United | 8 | (0) |
| 2024 | → Nantes (loan) | 14 | (0) |
| 2024–2026 | Basel | 66 | (22) |
| 2026– | New York City FC | 7 | (1) |

International career^{‡}
| 2023– | Ivory Coast | 2 | (1) |
- * Club domestic league appearances and goals as of 26 May 2026 ‡ National team caps and goals as of 00:03, 5 January 2024 (UTC)

Bénie Adama Traoré (born 30 November 2002) is an Ivorian professional footballer who plays as a forward or winger for Major League Soccer club New York City FC and the Ivory Coast national team.

== Club career ==
After two years with ASEC Mimosas, Traoré joined Häcken in January 2021. He made his debut in a Svenska Cupen match against Dalkurd in February. He scored his first goal against IK Gauthiod in the Svenska Cupen on 27 February. He made his Allsvenskan debut on 24 April against Halmstad. In March 2022, during a Svenska Cupen match against Hammarby, his leg was severely injured and he was sidelined for eight months. He signed a new contract with Häcken on 26 September 2022 and went on to win the 2022 Allsvenskan after recovering from his injury.

In July 2023 he joined newly promoted Premier League side Sheffield United on a four-year contract for an undisclosed fee. He made his official debut on 12 August 2023 in a 1–0 loss to Crystal Palace in the Premier League.

On 4 January 2024, Traoré joined Ligue 1 club Nantes on loan until the end of the 2023–24 season, with an option to make the move permanent.

On 22 July 2024, Traoré signed for Swiss Super League club Basel for a reported fee, signing a four-year deal.

On 29 June 2026, Traoré joined Major League Soccer club New York City FC.

== International career ==
Traoré was called up to the Ivory Coast U23s in March 2023.

== Career statistics ==
=== Club ===
As of match played 22 January 2026

Appearances and goals by club, season and competition
| Club | Season | League | | | National cup (Note: Includes Svenska Cupen, FA Cup, Coupe de France and Swiss Cup) | | League cup (Note: Includes EFL Cup) | | Continental | | Total | |
| Club | Season | Division | Apps | Goals | Apps | Goals | Apps | Goals | Apps | Goals | Apps | Goals |
|---|---|---|---|---|---|---|---|---|---|---|---|---|
| Häcken | 2021 | Allsvenskan | 27 | 3 | 7 | 3 | — | | 1 (Note: Appearance(s) in UEFA Europa Conference League) | 0 | 34 | 6 |
| Häcken | 2022 | Allsvenskan | 0 | 0 | 3 | 4 | — | | 0 | 0 | 5 | 4 |
| Häcken | 2023 | Allsvenskan | 14 | 12 | 6 | 3 | — | | 0 | 0 | 20 | 15 |
| Häcken | Total | | 41 | 15 | 16 | 10 | — | | 1 | 0 | 58 | 25 |
| Sheffield United | 2023–24 | Premier League | 8 | 0 | 0 | 0 | 1 | 0 | — | | 9 | 0 |
| Nantes (loan) | 2023–24 | Ligue 1 | 14 | 0 | 1 | 0 | — | | — | | 15 | 0 |
| Basel | 2024–25 | Swiss Super League | 36 | 13 | 4 | 1 | — | | — | | 40 | 14 |
| Basel | 2025–26 | Swiss Super League | 14 | 4 | 1 | 2 | — | | 5 (Note: Appearance(s) in UEFA Europa League) | 0 | 20 | 6 |
| Basel | Total | | 50 | 17 | 5 | 3 | — | | 5 | 0 | 60 | 20 |
| Career total | | | 113 | 32 | 22 | 13 | 1 | 0 | 6 | 0 | 142 | 45 |

=== International ===
As of match played 19 November 2024

Appearances and goals by national team and year
| National team | Year | Apps | Goals |
|---|---|---|---|
| Ivory Coast | 2024 | 5 | 0 |
| Total | | 5 | 0 |

== Honours ==
Häcken

- Allsvenskan: 2022
- Svenska Cupen: 2022–23

Basel

- Swiss Super League: 2024–25
