= Brian Beyer =

French footballer (born 1996)

Personal information
- Date of birth: 15 October 1996 (age 30)
- Place of birth: Mulhouse, France
- Height: 1.84 m (6 ft 0 in)
- Position: Forward

Team information
- Current team: Winterthur
- Number: 68

Senior career*
Years	Team	Apps	(Gls)
2018	ASM Belfort	2	(0)
2019	FC Bassecourt	11	(9)
2019–2021	FC Biel-Bienne	42	(22)
2022–2023	Yverdon-Sport	60	(14)
2024	Annecy	10	(0)
2024	VfL Osnabrück	8	(0)
2025	FC Biel-Bienne	16	(9)
2025–	Winterthur	23	(3)
2026	Vaduz (loan)	15	(8)
- * Club domestic league appearances and goals as of 28 September 2026

Brian Beyer (born 15 October 1996) is a French professional footballer who plays as a forward for Swiss Super League club Winterthur.

== Early life ==
Beyer is a native of Alsace, France. He played in the rural community of Oberburnhaupt.

== Career ==
In 2022, Beyer signed for Swiss side Yverdon-Sport, where he was regarded as one of the club's most important players. He helped them achieve promotion.

In July 2024, Beyer joined German 3. Liga club VfL Osnabrück. He was released by Osnabrück on 23 December 2024. He joined FC Biel-Bienne in January 2025.

== Style of play ==
Beyer mainly operates as a striker and is known for his strength.

== Personal life ==
Beyer has been married and has a daughter.
