= Moussa Cissé (footballer) =

French footballer (born 2003)

Personal information
- Date of birth: 29 April 2003 (age 23)
- Place of birth: Saint-Denis, France
- Height: 1.77 m (5 ft 10 in)
- Position: Left-back

Team information
- Current team: Basel
- Number: 29

Youth career
- 2009–2015: Tremblay FC
- 2015–2021: Paris Saint-Germain

Senior career*
| Years | Team | Apps | (Gls) |
| 2021–2024 | Stuttgart II | 54 | (0) |
| 2024– | Basel | 27 | (0) |

International career^{‡}
| 2018 | France U16 | 5 | (0) |
- * Club domestic league appearances and goals as of 28 September 2026 ‡ National team caps and goals as of 01:49, 13 May 2025 (UTC)

Moussa Cissé (born 29 April 2003) is a French professional footballer who plays as a left-back for Basel.

== Club career ==
Cissé is a product of the youth academies of Tremblay FC and Paris Saint-Germain. On 3 August 2021, he joined the reserves of Stuttgart on a contract until 2025. On 30 August 2024, he transferred to the Swiss Super League club FC Basel on a contract until 2028. He made his senior and professional debut with Basel in a 1–0 Swiss Cup win over FC Stade Nyonnais on 15 September 2024.

== International career ==
Born in France, Cissé is of Malian descent. He played for the France U16s for sets of friendlies in 2018.

== Honours ==
Basel

- Swiss Super League: 2024–25
