= 2024–25 Swiss Super League =

128th season of top-tier Swiss football

Swiss Super League
- Season: 2024–25
- Dates: 20 July 2024 – 24 May 2025
- Champions: Basel; 21st title
- Relegated: Yverdon-Sport
- Champions League: Basel; Servette
- Europa League: Young Boys; Lugano
- Conference League: Lausanne-Sport
- Matches: 228
- Goals: 679 (2.98 per match)
- Top goalscorer: Xherdan Shaqiri (18 goals)
- Biggest home win: 5–0; BAS – WIN (2 Nov '24); GCZ – YS (14 May '25)
- Biggest away win: 0–6; SER – BAS (11 Aug '24)
- Highest scoring: 3–4; STG – LS (4 Aug '24); WIN – LUZ (14 Dec '24)

The 2024–25 Swiss Super League (referred to as the Credit Suisse Super League for sponsoring reasons) was the 128th season of top-tier competitive football in Switzerland and the 22nd under its current name. It was the second season featuring a new format and increased number of participants, since the beginning of the Super League era in 2003. Young Boys were the defending champions, having successfully defended their title in the previous season.

== Overview ==
=== Format and schedule ===
Since rebranding and restructuring the National League A to the Super League, starting with the 2003–04 season, the league has been running under the same format and the same number of teams until 2023. This is the second season to be played under the so-called Scottish Model and includes twelve participating teams.

The Swiss Football League (SFL) released a detailed schedule on 5 December 2023:

- The season will begin on 20 July 2024 and conclude on 24 May 2025.
- The league will go on winter break after matchday 18 on 15 December 2024 and resume on 18 January 2025. The final matchday of the relegation group will take place on, while the championship group will hold its last matches .
- The two legs of the relegation play-offs are scheduled for 27 and 30 May 2025, respectively.

The season is divided into two phases:

- In a first phase all twelve teams play each other three times each, for a total of 33 matchdays and concludes on 21 April 2025.
- Following that, the league is split into two groups of six each, one championship group and one relegation group. The second phase begins on 4 May 2025.
  - Each team will play every other team in their group one time (five matches each), for a total of 38 matchdays.
  - The championship group will play for the title of Swiss Football Champion and qualification for European championships. Final matchday is on 24 May 2025.
  - The relegation group will play against relegation (last place) and qualification for the relegation play-off (second-to-last place). Final matchday will be on 22 May 2025.
- Points won in the first phase are carried over to the second phase.

== Teams ==
=== Team changes ===
2023–24 Swiss Challenge League champions FC Sion were directly promoted just one season after their relegation in the 2022-23 season. They replace Stade Lausanne Ouchy, who were directly relegated as the last placed team of the 2023–24 Swiss Super League ending their single season stint in the top flight. Grasshopper Club Zurich remain in the Super League, as the winner of the relegation play-off against the runners-up of last season's Challenge League, FC Thun.

=== Stadia and locations ===
FC Basel	Grasshopper Club Zurich	FC Zürich	FC Lausanne-Sport	FC Lugano
St. Jakob-Park	Letzigrund		Stade de la Tuilière	Stadio Cornaredo
Basel	Zurich		Lausanne	Lugano
Capacity: 37,994	Capacity: 26,103		Capacity: 12,544	Capacity: 6,390
FC Luzern	Location of the 2025–26 Swiss Super League teams			Servette FC
Swissporarena	Location of the 2025–26 Swiss Super League teams			Stade de Genève
Luzern	Location of the 2025–26 Swiss Super League teams			Geneva
Capacity: 16,490	Location of the 2025–26 Swiss Super League teams			Capacity: 28,833
FC Sion	FC St. Gallen	FC Winterthur	BSC Young Boys	Yverdon-Sport FC
Stade de Tourbillon	Kybunpark	Stadion Schützenwiese	Stadion Wankdorf	Stade Municipal
Sion	St. Gallen	Winterthur	Bern	Yverdon-les-Bains
Capacity: 14,283	Capacity: 19,455	Capacity: 8,400	Capacity: 31,120	Capacity: 6,600

No. of teams	Cantons	Team(s)
3
3	Zürich	Zürich, Grasshopper, Winterthur
2
2	Vaud	Lausanne-Sport, Yverdon-Sport
1
1	Bern	Young Boys
1	Basel-Stadt	Basel
1	Lucerne	Luzern
1	St. Gallen	St. Gallen
1	Valais	Sion
1	Geneva	Servette
1	Ticino	Lugano

=== Personnel and kits ===
Team	President	Manager	Captain	Kit manufacturer	Shirt sponsor (front) (Note: Institutional sponsor UBS Helpetica features on the front of the shirt for all teams participating in the Super League.)	Shirt sponsor (back)	Shirt sponsor (sleeve)	Shorts sponsor
Basel	(Switzerland) David Degen	(Switzerland) Fabio Celestini	(Switzerland) Xherdan Shaqiri	Macron	Novartis	None	Bank CIC, hoffmann automobile	Feldschlösschen
Grasshopper	(United States) Stacy Johns	(Germany) Tomas Oral	(Albania) Amir Abrashi	Capelli Sport	None	None	None	None
Lausanne-Sport	(Netherlands) Leen Heemskerk	(Switzerland) Ludovic Magnin	(Switzerland) Olivier Custodio	In-house	Banque Cantonale Vaudoise	Ineos	Enzonet	None
Lugano	(Switzerland) Philippe Regazzoni	(Switzerland) Mattia Croci-Torti	(Switzerland) Mattia Bottani	Erreà	AIL/Lugano’s Plan ₿ (in UEFA matches)	None	HRS Real Estate/AIL (in UEFA matches)	GTL Impresa Costruzioni
Luzern	(Switzerland) Stefan Wolf, (Switzerland) Josef Bieri (interim)	(Liechtenstein) Mario Frick	(Germany) Pius Dorn	Erreà	Otto’s	Luzerner Kantonalbank	mycasino	Maréchaux Elektro
Servette	(Switzerland) Didier Fischer	(Switzerland) Thomas Häberli	(Switzerland) Jérémy Frick & (Switzerland) Steve Rouiller	Adidas	MSC Cruises	None	None	Berney Associés, Ebury
Sion	(Switzerland) Christian Constantin	(France) Didier Tholot	(Switzerland) Reto Ziegler	Macron	OIKEN (H)/Alloboisons (A), Christian Constantin SA (H)/Groupe Arsa (A)	Hestia Conseils	None	None
St. Gallen	(Switzerland) Matthias Hüppi	(German Football Association) Enrico Maaßen	(Germany) Lukas Görtler	Puma	St.Galler Kantonalbank	Mettler Entwickelt	D+D Immobilien, Schützengarten	Malbuner, ZIMA Unternehmensgruppe
Winterthur	(Switzerland) Mike Keller	(Switzerland) Uli Forte	(Kosovo) Granit Lekaj	gpard	Keller Druckmesstechnik, Init7	Schiess Reinigungen	Condecta, Mr. Green Recycling	Orgnet Immobilien, Göldi AG
Young Boys	(Switzerland) Hanspeter Kienberger	(Switzerland) Giorgio Contini	(Switzerland) David von Ballmoos	Nike	Plus500	KPT Krankenkasse	Weiss+Appetito	AMAG, Komit
Yverdon-Sport	(United States) Jeffrey Saunders	(Italy) Paolo Tramezzani	(France) William Le Pogam	Macron	Kinetik	Shaw and Partners Financial Services	Energa	None
Zürich	(Switzerland) Ancillo Canepa	(Netherlands) Ricardo Moniz	(Switzerland) Yanick Brecher	Castore	NOKERA	None	MG Cars	None

=== Managerial changes ===
Team	Outgoing manager	Manner of departure	Date of departure	Position in table	Incoming manager	Date of appointment	Ref.
Winterthur	(Switzerland) Patrick Rahmen	Mutual consent	14 May 2024	Pre-season	(Serbia) Ognjen Zarić	1 July 2024	
St. Gallen	(Germany) Peter Zeidler	Mutual consent	8 June 2024	Pre-season	(Germany) Enrico Maaßen	1 July 2024	
Young Boys	(Switzerland) Joël Magnin	End of caretaker spell	14 May 2024	Pre-season	(Switzerland) Patrick Rahmen	1 July 2024	
Servette	(Switzerland) René Weiler	Resigned	10 June 2024	Pre-season	(Switzerland) Thomas Häberli	1 July 2024	
Young Boys	(Switzerland) Patrick Rahmen	Termination	8 October 2024	12th	(Switzerland) Joël Magnin (caretaker)	8 October 2024	
Grasshopper	(Switzerland) Marco Schällibaum	Termination	5 November 2024	11th	(Switzerland) Giuseppe Morello (caretaker)	5 November 2024	
Grasshopper	(Switzerland) Giuseppe Morello (caretaker)	End of caretaker spell	19 November 2024	11th	(Germany) Tomas Oral	19 November 2024	
Yverdon-Sport	(Switzerland) Alessandro Mangiarratti	Termination	17 December 2024	10th	(Italy) Paolo Tramezzani	28 December 2024	
Winterthur	(Serbia) Ognjen Zarić	Termination	17 December 2024	12th	(Switzerland) Uli Forte	24 December 2024	
Young Boys	(Switzerland) Joël Magnin	End of caretaker spell	18 December 2024	9th	(Switzerland) Giorgio Contini	18 December 2024	

== Table ==
Pos	Team	Pld	W	D	L	GF	GA	GD	Pts	Qualification or relegation (Note: Teams play each other three times (33 matches), before the league is split into two groups (the top six and the bottom six).)
1	Basel (C)	38	22	7	9	91	43	+48	73	Qualification for the Champions League play-off round
2	Servette	38	17	12	9	64	55	+9	63	Qualification for the Champions League second qualifying round
3	Young Boys	38	17	10	11	60	49	+11	61	Qualification for the Europa League play-off round (Note: The 2024–25 Swiss Cup winner (Basel) qualifies for the Europa League play-off round. Since the cup winner finished in the top three, the remaining European berths were passed down to the next highest qualifying teams.)
4	Lugano	38	15	9	14	55	58	−3	54	Qualification for the Europa League second qualifying round
5	Lausanne-Sport	38	14	11	13	62	54	+8	53	Qualification for the Conference League second qualifying round
6	Luzern	38	14	10	14	66	64	+2	52	
7	Zürich	38	15	8	15	56	57	−1	53	
8	St. Gallen	38	13	13	12	52	53	−1	52	
9	Sion	38	11	11	16	47	57	−10	44	
10	Winterthur	38	11	7	20	43	68	−25	40	
11	Grasshopper (O)	38	9	12	17	43	53	−10	39	Qualification for the Relegation play-off
12	Yverdon-Sport (R)	38	9	12	17	40	68	−28	39	Relegation to Swiss Challenge League

Source: Swiss Super League
Rules for classification: 1) Points; 2) Goal difference; 3) Goals scored; 4) Head-to-head goal difference; 5) Head-to-head goals scored 6) Away goals scored; 7) Draw.
(C) Champions; (O) Play-off winners; (R) Relegated

== Results ==
=== First and second rounds ===
Home \ Away	BAS	GCZ	LS	LUG	LUZ	SER	SIO	STG	WIN	YB	YS	ZÜR
Basel		0–1	1–1	1–2	2–1	3–1	4–1	2–1	5–0	1–0	2–0	0–2
Grasshopper	0–3		2–2	1–1	2–2	2–2	3–1	1–2	1–1	0–0	1–1	1–2
Lausanne-Sport	3–2	3–0		1–2	0–0	1–0	1–0	3–4	2–0	1–2	3–1	3–0
Lugano	2–2	2–1	1–4		2–3	3–1	3–2	1–1	2–1	2–0	2–0	4–1
Luzern	1–0	2–0	2–2	1–4		1–2	1–0	2–0	3–0	1–1	2–3	3–1
Servette	0–6	1–1	1–0	3–0	2–2		3–0	1–1	1–1	3–1	3–2	1–1
Sion	1–1	0–1	4–0	0–0	4–2	3–3		2–2	2–0	3–1	1–1	0–2
St. Gallen	1–1	1–0	3–2	2–1	2–3	1–1	1–1		2–2	4–0	0–0	4–1
Winterthur	1–6	1–0	1–0	2–3	3–4	0–1	1–3	1–0		1–4	0–0	0–2
Young Boys	3–2	0–1	1–1	2–1	2–1	2–1	1–2	3–1	0–0		6–1	2–2
Yverdon-Sport	1–4	2–1	0–3	2–0	0–1	0–0	0–1	1–0	3–0	2–2		0–2
Zürich	0–1	1–1	2–0	1–1	1–1	1–3	1–0	0–2	4–2	0–0	1–0	

Source: Swiss Football League
Legend: Blue = home team win; Yellow = draw; Red = away team win.

=== Third round ===
Home \ Away	BAS	GCZ	LS	LUG	LUZ	SER	SIO	STG	WIN	YB	YS	ZÜR
Basel		2–1	1–1	2–0			2–0			1–2	5–0	
Grasshopper					3–1	1–2	1–1		0–1	1–0		1–2
Lausanne-Sport		2–2		2–0	1–4	0–1	2–0				4–1	
Lugano		1–1			2–0	0–2		1–1	2–1			0–3
Luzern	1–1						2–1	1–1	3–2	5–0		
Servette	2–1				2–1				3–1	0–1	2–3	
Sion				2–1		1–1			1–2		1–1	2–1
St. Gallen	2–2	3–1	0–2			1–0	1–0					
Winterthur	0–2		1–0					4–0		1–0		0–0
Young Boys			3–0	1–0			5–1	1–0			1–1	2–1
Yverdon-Sport		1–2		0–2	2–2			1–0	2–1			
Zürich	0–4		2–2		3–2	1–3		1–2			2–1	

Source: Swiss Football League
Legend: Blue = home team win; Yellow = draw; Red = away team win.

=== Split ===
After 33 matches, the league splits into two groups of six teams. The top six are grouped into the championship group and the bottom six into the relegation group, with the teams playing every other team in their group once (either at home or away). The exact matches are determined by the position of the teams in the league table at the time of the split.

==== Championship Group ====
Home \ Away	BAS	SER	YB	LUZ	LUG	LS
Basel		5–1		4–0		
Servette			0–0		4–1	3–3
Young Boys	6–2			2–1		
Luzern		3–4			0–2	1–1
Lugano	2–5		1–1			
Lausanne-Sport	2–3		3–2		1–1	

Source: Swiss Football League
Legend: Blue = home team win; Yellow = draw; Red = away team win.

==== Relegation Group ====
Home \ Away	GCZ	SIO	STG	WIN	YS	ZÜR
Grasshopper			2–0		5–0	
Sion	2–1		1–1			2–1
St. Gallen				1–4		3–2
Winterthur	2–0	2–0			2–2	
Yverdon-Sport		1–1	1–1			3–2
Zürich	3–0			4–1		

Source: Swiss Football League
Legend: Blue = home team win; Yellow = draw; Red = away team win.

== Relegation play-off ==
The relegation play-off was played in a two-legged game between the eleventh placed team of the Super League (5th of the relegation group) and the second placed team of the Challenge League. The two legs of the relegation play-offs were scheduled for 27 and 30 May 2025, respectively. On 28 March 2025, it was decided by draw that the representative of the Super League will host the first match.

The winner of the play-off was whichever team scored more goals over both games (no away goals rule). In case of a tie at the end of the two games, 30 minutes of extra time (two times 15 minutes) were added, followed by a penalty shoot-out, in case the teams were still tied.

=== First leg ===
27 May 2025
20:30 CEST (UTC+2)

Grasshopper	4–0	Aarau
Lee 14'; Schürpf 41'; Muci 79'; Seko 86' (pen.)	Report

Stadio Cornaredo, Lugano (Note: Grasshoppers's home game were played in Lugano, due to the Letzigrund being unavailable on the dates of the play-off.)
Attendance: 3,800
Referee: Urs Schnyder

=== Second leg ===
30 May 2025
20:30 CEST (UTC+2)

Aarau	1–0	Grasshopper
Obexer 82'	Report

Stadion Brügglifeld, Aarau
Attendance: 8,450
Referee: Sandro Schärer

Grasshopper wins 4–1 on aggregate

== Statistics ==
=== Top goalscorers ===
Rank	Player	Club	Goals
1	(Switzerland) Xherdan Shaqiri	Basel	18
2	(Switzerland) Dereck Kutesa	Servette	15
3	(France) Willem Geubbels	St. Gallen	14
3	(Bosnia and Herzegovina) Miroslav Stevanovic	Servette	14
5	(Spain) Kevin Carlos	Basel	13
5	(Ivory Coast) Bénie Traoré	Basel	13
7	(Switzerland) Alvyn Sanches	Lausanne-Sport	12
8	(Switzerland) Christian Fassnacht	Young Boys	11
9	(Togo) Thibault Klidjé	Luzern	10
9	(Switzerland) Albian Ajeti	Basel	10

== Awards ==
=== Annual awards ===
Award	Winner	Club	Source
Player of the Year	(Switzerland) Xherdan Shaqiri	FC Basel	
Top scorer	(Switzerland) Xherdan Shaqiri	FC Basel	18 goals
Fair Play Trophy	Servette FC	Servette FC	

=== Team of the Season ===
Team of the Season
Goalkeeper	(Croatia) Karlo Letica (Lausanne-Sport)			
Defence	(Switzerland) Steve Rouiller (Servette)	(Switzerland) Loris Benito (Young Boys)		(Belgium) Noë Dussenne (Lausanne-Sport)
Midfield	(Italy) Mattia Zanotti (Lugano)	(France) Timothé Cognat (Servette)	(Switzerland) Alvyn Sanches (Lausanne-Sport)	(Switzerland) Dominik Schmid (Basel)
Forwards	(Serbia) Miroslav Stevanović (Servette)	(Switzerland) Xherdan Shaqiri (Basel)		(Ivory Coast) Bénie Traoré (Basel)

== Attendances ==
The BSC Young Boys drew the highest average home attendance in the 2024-25 edition of the Swiss Super League.

#	Football club	Home games	Average attendance
1	BSC Young Boys	19	28,482
2	FC Basel	19	26,150
3	FC St. Gallen	19	18,079
4	FC Zürich	19	15,223
5	FC Luzern	19	12,074
6	FC Sion	19	9,932
7	Servette FC	19	9,932
8	FC Winterthur	19	8,065
9	FC Lausanne-Sport	19	6,904
10	Grasshopper Club Zürich	19	6,878
11	FC Lugano	19	3,883
12	Yverdon-Sport	19	2,770
