= 2011–12 FC Sion season =

Sion
2012–13 season
- Chairman: Christian Constantin
- Manager: Sébastien Fournier
- Stadium: Stade Tourbillon
- Swiss Super League: 9th
- Swiss Cup: Semi-Final
- Top goalscorer: League: Vilmos Vanczák (10); All: Vilmos Vanczák (12)

The 2011–12 FC Sion season started on 16 July 2011.

== Review and events ==
=== Transfer controversy ===
==== History ====
The controversy started when FC Sion signed Essam El-Hadary in 2008.

==== 2011–12 Events ====
FC Sion originally drew 0-0 and won 3–1 against Celtic F.C. in the Europa League. However, UEFA overturned the results and awarded Celtic F.C. 3-0 forfeit victories for both legs of the tie. FC Sion lost their appeal to re-enter the competition.

The Swiss Football Association deducted 36 points from FC Sion. Three points were deducted for each of the 12 league and cup matches in which one or more of the six ineligible players appeared. The 36 points deduction left FC Sion in last place and minus 5 points. FIFA had threatened to suspend the Swiss Football Association if there was no action against FC Sion. This meant that all national teams and clubs under the jurisdiction of the Swiss Football Association would not be allowed to participate in any FIFA and UEFA competition.

== Squad ==
No.	Name	Nationality	Position	Date of birth (Age)	Signed from
Goalkeepers
1	Andris Vanins	(Latvia)	GK	30 April 1980 (age 46)	Ventspils
18	Kevin Fickentscher	(Switzerland)	GK	6 July 1988 (age 38)	La Chaux-de-Fonds
30	Steven Deana	(Switzerland)	GK	4 March 1990 (age 36)	Vaduz
Defenders
4	José Gonçalves	(Portugal)	CB	17 September 1985 (age 41)	St. Gallen
5	Michael Dingsdag	(Netherlands)	CB	18 October 1982 (age 44)	Heerenveen
6	George Ogăraru	(Romania)	CB	3 February 1980 (age 46)	Ajax
20	Vilmos Vanczák	(Hungary)	CB	20 June 1983 (age 43)	Újpest
31	Arnaud Bühler	(Switzerland)	CB	17 January 1985 (age 41)	Sochaux
33	Adaílton	(Brazil)	CB	16 April 1983 (age 43)	Santos
Midfielders
3	Gabri García	(Spain)	MF	10 February 1979 (age 47)	Umm Salal
7	Mario Mutsch	(Luxembourg)	MF	3 September 1984 (age 42)	Metz
8	Rodrigo Lacerda Ramos	(Brazil)	MF	6 October 1980 (age 46)	Júbilo Iwata
10	Fabrizio Zambrella	(Switzerland)	MF	1 March 1986 (age 40)	Brescia
12	Billy Ketkeophomphone	(France)	MF	24 March 1990 (age 36)	Strasbourg
13	Giovanni Sio	(Switzerland)	MF	7 November 1984 (age 42)	Real Sociedad
14	Pascal Feindouno	(Guinea)	MF	21 February 1981 (age 45)	AS Monaco
15	Jonas Elmer	(Switzerland)	MF	28 February 1988 (age 38)	Aarau
16	Didier Crettenand	(Switzerland)	MF	24 February 1986 (age 40)	Lausanne-Sport
21	Abdoul Yoda	(France)	MF	25 October 1988 (age 38)	Servette
22	Goran Obradović	(Serbia)	MF	1 March 1976 (age 50)	Vaduz
26	Serey Die	(Ivory Coast)	MF	6 July 1988 (age 38)	ES Sétif
27	Stefan Glarner	(Switzerland)	MF	21 November 1987 (age 38)	Thun
29	Florian Berisha	(Switzerland)	MF	18 January 1990 (age 36)	
32	Anthony Sauthier	(Switzerland)	MF	5 February 1991 (age 35)	
Forwards
11	Christ Mbondi	(Cameroon)	ST	2 February 1992 (age 34)	
17	Guilherme Afonso	(Switzerland)	ST	15 November 1985 (age 40)	Lugano
19	Dragan Mrđa	(Serbia)	FW	23 January 1984 (age 42)	Vojvodina

== Match results ==
=== Legend ===
Win Draw Loss Void

=== Super League ===
16 July 2011 1	FC Sion	1–0	FC Zürich	Sion
17:45 CEST	Obradović 74'	Match report		Stadium: Stade Tourbillon; Attendance: 10,500; Referee: Alain Bieri

23 July 2011 2	FC Sion	1–2	BSC Young Boys	Sion
17:45 CEST	Sio 92'	Match report	Schneuwly 34'; Degen 84'	Stadium: Stade Tourbillon; Attendance: 12,500; Referee: Nikolaj Hänni

31 July 2011 3	Neuchâtel Xamax	0–3	FC Sion	Neuchâtel
16:00 CEST		Match report	Vanczák 44', 81'; Sio 54'	Stadium: Stade de la Maladière; Attendance: 4,603; Referee: Alain Bieri

6 August 2011 4	FC Basel	3–3	FC Sion	Basel
17:45 CEST	Zoua 15'; Shaqiri 24'; Cabral 92'	Match report	Vanczák 6'; Adaílton 19'; Sio 79'	Stadium: St. Jakob-Park; Attendance: 27,702; Referee: Patrick Graf

13 August 2011 5	FC Sion	1–1	FC Luzern	Sion
17:45 CEST	Vanczák 63'	Match report	Winter 5'	Stadium: Stade Tourbillon; Attendance: 13,200; Referee: Ludovic Gremaud

21 August 2011 6	FC Lausanne-Sport	0–2	FC Sion	Lausanne
17:15 CEST		Match report	Feindouno 82', 88'	Stadium: Stade Olympique de la Pontaise; Attendance: 8,800; Referee: Jérôme Laperrière

28 August 2011 7	FC Sion	0–4	Servette FC	Sion
16:00 CEST		Match report	Routis 9'; Vitkieviez 20', 65'; Yartey 24'	Stadium: Stade Tourbillon; Attendance: 15,300; Referee: Adrien Jaccottet

11 September 2011 8	FC Thun	0–3	FC Sion	Thun
16:00 CEST		Match report	Sio 13', 45'; Mutsch 90'	Stadium: Arena Thun; Attendance: 5,822; Referee: Ludovic Gremaud

22 September 2011 9	FC Sion	2–0	Grasshopper	Sion
19:45 CEST	Feindouno 11'; Mutsch 42'	Match report		Stadium: Stade Tourbillon; Attendance: 8,300; Referee: Patrick Graf

25 September 2011 10	FC Luzern	2–0	FC Sion	Lucerne
16:00 CEST	Yakin 18' (pen.); Renggli 90' (pen.)	Match report		Stadium: Swissporarena; Attendance: 16,315; Referee: Sascha Kever

2 October 2011 11	FC Sion	1–0	FC Lausanne-Sport	Sion
16:00 CEST	Obradović 59'	Match report		Stadium: Stade Tourbillon; Attendance: 10,000; Referee: Alain Bieri

23 October 2011 12	Servette FC	0–2	FC Sion	Geneva
16:00 CEST		Match report	Vanczák 28'; Sio 78'	Stadium: Stade de Genève; Attendance: 10,718; Referee: Stephan Klossner

26 October 2011 13	FC Sion	0–1	FC Basel	Sion
19:45 CEST		Match report	Zoua 28'	Stadium: Stade Tourbillon; Attendance: 10,800; Referee: Sascha Kever

29 October 2011 14	FC Sion	2–0	FC Thun	Sion
17:45 CEST	Vanczák 55'; Mrđa 78'	Match report		Stadium: Stade Tourbillon; Attendance: 9,300; Referee: Stephan Studer

5 November 2011 15	Grasshopper	2–1	FC Sion	Zürich
16:00 CET	Mustafi 10'; Feltscher 38'	Match report	Sio 29'	Stadium: Letzigrund; Attendance: 4,000; Referee: Jérôme Laperrière

20 November 2011 16	FC Sion	2–0	Neuchâtel Xamax	Sion
16:00 CET	Afonso 12'; Yoda 18'	Match report		Stadium: Stade Tourbillon; Attendance: 9,800; Referee: Patrick Graf

4 December 2011 17	BSC Young Boys	1–1	FC Sion	Bern
16:00 CET	Costanzo 12'	Match report	Wölfli 12' (o.g.)	Stadium: Stade de Suisse, Wankdorf; Attendance: 22,756; Referee: Stephan Studer

10 December 2011 18	FC Zürich	1–1	FC Sion	Zürich
17:45 CET	Mehmedi 32'	Match report	Vanczák 65'	Stadium: Letzigrund; Attendance: 8,600; Referee: Damien Carrel

5 February 2012 19	FC Basel	0 - 0	FC Sion	Basel
16:00 CET	Shaqiri (yellow card) 62'	Summary	Adaílton (yellow card) 41'; Dingsdag (yellow card) 57'; Basha (yellow card) 67'	Stadium: St. Jakob-Park; Attendance: 25,762; Referee: Damien Carrel

12 February 2012 20	FC Sion	0-1	BSC Young Boys	Sion
16:00 CET		Summary	Spycher 83' (pen.)	Stadium: Stade Tourbillon; Attendance: 8,700; Referee: Stephan Klossner

18 February 2012 21	Neuchâtel Xamax	-	FC Sion	Neuchâtel
17:46 CET				Stadium: Stade de la Maladière

26 February 2012 22	FC Sion	0 - 1	Servette FC	Sion
16:00 CET	Margairaz (yellow card) 23'	Report	Pizzinat (yellow card) 72'; Karanović 84'	Stadium: Stade Tourbillon; Attendance: 12,300; Referee: Ludovic Gremaud

3 March 2012 23	FC Zürich	0 - 1	FC Sion	Zürich
17:45 CET	Pedro Henrique Konzen (yellow card) 53'; Koch (yellow card) 71'; Barmettler (yellow card) 82'; Chermiti (yellow card) 86'	Report	Yoda 16'; Adaílton (yellow card) 28'; Vanczák (yellow card) 77'; Bühler (yellow card) 83'	Stadium: Letzigrund; Attendance: 10,500; Referee: Stephan Studer

10 March 2012 24	FC Sion	1 - 0	FC Thun	Sion
17:45 CET	Danilo 30' (yellow card) 90+5'; Crettenand (yellow card) 89'	Report	Matić (yellow card) 8'; Bättig (yellow card) 73'; Schirinzi (yellow card) 90+4'	Stadium: Stade Tourbillon; Attendance: 8,800; Referee: Daniel Wermelinger

17 March 2012 25	FC Luzern	0 - 0	FC Sion	Lucerne
17:45 CET		Report	Rodrigo (yellow card) 45'	Stadium: Swissporarena; Attendance: 11,498; Referee: Damien Carrel

25 March 2012 26	FC Sion	1 - 0	FC Lausanne-Sport	Sion
16:00 CEST	Dingsdag (yellow card) 54'; Serey Die (yellow card) 60'; Danick Yerly 74'	Report	Bah (yellow card) 34'	Stadium: Stade Tourbillon; Attendance: 10,500; Referee: Patrick Graf

31 March 2012 27	Grasshopper	0 - 2	FC Sion	Zürich
17:45 CEST		Report	Vanczák 45'; Bühler 49'	Stadium: Letzigrund; Attendance: 3,400; Referee: Cyril Zimmermann

7 April 2012 28	FC Sion	2 - 1	FC Zürich	Sion
17:45 CEST	Vaņins (yellow card) 45'; Bühler (yellow card) 45'; Die 58'; Vanczák 71'	Report	Chikhaoui (yellow card) 19' (goal) 33' (pen.); Glarner (yellow card) 26'; Barmettler (yellow card) 40'; Buff (yellow card) 88'	Stadium: Stade Tourbillon; Attendance: 10,500; Referee: Damien Carrel

15 April 2012 29	Servette FC	2 - 2	FC Sion	Geneva
16:00 CEST	Pont (yellow card) 26'; Rüfli (yellow card) 45'; Routis (yellow card) 77'; Yartey 87' (pen.); Daniel Soares 90'	Report	Wüthrich 17'; Dingsdag (yellow card) 87'; Karanović 90+3' (o.g.)	Stadium: Stade de Genève; Attendance: 8,212; Referee: Daniel Wermelinger

22 April 2012 30	Sion	0–3	Basel	Tourbillon, Sion
16:00	Basha (yellow card) 41'; Serey Die (yellow card) 63'; Danilo (yellow card) 71'		(yellow card) 24' Xhaka; 49', 83' A. Frei; (yellow card) 53' Streller; 74' Steinhöfer	Attendance: 12,500; Referee: Stephan Studer

29 April 2012 31	FC Thun	1–1	FC Sion	Thun
16:00 CEST	Aislan 69' (o.g.)	Report	Ianu 30'	Stadium: Arena Thun; Attendance: 5,703; Referee: Sascha Kever

2 May 2012 32	FC Lausanne-Sport	1 - 0	FC Sion	Lausanne
19:45 CEST	Roux 14'; Tall (yellow card) 35'; Sanogo (yellow card) 62'	Report	Adaílton (yellow card) 24'; Ianu (yellow card) 32'	Stadium: Stade Olympique de la Pontaise; Attendance: 7,900; Referee: Nikolaj Hänni

6 May 2012 33	FC Sion	3 - 2	Grasshopper	Sion
16:00 CEST	Ianu 15' (pen.); Crettenand 28'; Danick Yerly 50'; Mutsch (yellow card) 74'	Report	Zuber 7', 22'	Stadium: Stade Tourbillon; Attendance: 6,500; Referee: Sascha Amhof

12 May 2012 34	FC Sion	v	Neuchâtel Xamax	Sion
17:45 CEST				Stadium: Stade Tourbillon

20 May 2012 35	BSC Young Boys	3 - 0	FC Sion	Bern
16:00 CEST	Farnerud 31'; Bobadilla 61'; Spycher (yellow card) 77'; Nef (yellow card) 79'; Michael Frey 90'	Report	Obradović (yellow card) 29' (yellow-red card) 59'; Mrđa (yellow card) 25'; Rodrigo (yellow card) 54'	Stadium: Stade de Suisse, Wankdorf; Attendance: 18,411; Referee: Sascha Arnhof

23 May 2012 36	FC Sion	1 - 3	FC Luzern	Sion
19:45 CEST	Danilo (yellow card) 24'; Ziburg 34' (o.g.); Wüthrich (yellow card) 71'; Basha (yellow card) 79'; Fickentscher (red card) 81'	Report	Stahel 39'; Lustenberger (yellow card) 71'; Kukeli 83' (pen.); Nelson Ferreira 90'	Stadium: Stade Tourbillon; Attendance: 5,200; Referee: Alain Bieri

==== Table ====
Pos	Team	Pld	W	D	L	GF	GA	GD	Pts	Qualification or relegation
6	Zürich	34	11	8	15	43	44	−1	41	
7	Lausanne-Sport	34	8	6	20	29	61	−32	30	
8	Grasshopper	34	7	5	22	32	66	−34	26	
9	Sion (O)	34	15	8	11	40	35	+5	17 (Note: Sion were deducted 36 points for fielding ineligible players.)	Qualification to relegation play-offs
10	Neuchâtel Xamax (D, R)	0	0	0	0	0	0	0	0 (Note: Neuchâtel Xamax's license was revoked with immediate effect and they were expelled from the Swiss Football League on 18 January 2012 after not providing necessary financial documents and guarantees. The first-half results of the club will be kept while any matches in spring involving Xamax were cancelled & all results were cancelled.)	Demotion to the 2. Liga interregional

Source: RSSSF
Rules for classification: 1) points; 2) goal difference; 3) number of goals scored.
(D) Disqualified; (O) Play-off winners; (R) Relegated

==== Relegation play-off ====
26 May 2012	Sion	3 – 0	Aarau	Sion
15:00 CEST	Mrđa 58', 81'; Margairaz 67'	Report		Stadium: Stade Tourbillon, Attendance: 10,800; Referee: Stephan Studer

28 May 2012	Aarau	1 – 0	Sion	Aarau
17:00 CEST	Gashi 55'	Report		Stadium: Stadion Brügglifeld,

Sion won 3 – 1 on aggregate.

=== Swiss Cup ===
18 September 2011 Round 1	FC Colombier	0–5	FC Sion	Colombier
14:30 CEST			Mrđa 16' (pen.); Crettenand 24'; Vanczák 27'; Bühler 35'; Afonso 90'	Stadium: Stade des Chézards; Attendance: 1,047; Referee: Damien Carrel

15 October 2011 Round 2	FC Sion	2–1	FC Stade Nyonnais	Sion
17:30 CEST	Feindouno 69'; Dingsdag 75'		Besseyre 37'	Stadium: Stade Tourbillon; Attendance: 3,500; Referee: Patrick Graf

27 November 2011 Round of 16	FC Tuggen	1–2	FC Sion	Tuggen
15:00 CET	Senn 69'		Yoda 22'; Elmer 81'	Stadium: Linthstrasse; Attendance: 2,250; Referee: Stephan Klossner

21 March 2012 Quarter-final	FC Biel-Bienne	1 - 3	FC Sion	Biel/Bienne
20:15 CET	Doudin 21' (yellow card) 65' (yellow-red card) 90+3'; Rafael Schweizer (yellow card) 34'; Pietro Di Nardo (yellow card) 87'; Sallaj (yellow card) 90+2'	Report	Yoda 9'; Wüthrich (yellow card) 54'; Obradović (yellow card) 68'; Adaílton (yellow card) 68'; Vanczák 82'; Danilo 90' (pen.)	Stadium: Gurzelen Stadion; Attendance: 3,938; Referee: Adrien Jacottet

11 April 2012 Semi Final	FC Sion	0 - 1	FC Luzern	Sion
20:15 CET	Adaílton (yellow card) 9'; Sauthier (yellow card) 19'; Bühler (yellow card) 58'	Report	Winter 7'; Ohayon (yellow card) 12'; Bühler (yellow card) 58'	Stadium: Stade Tourbillon; Attendance: 11,000; Referee: Stephan Studer

=== UEFA Europa League ===
18 August 2011 Play-off (1st leg)	Celtic F.C.	0–0^{1}	FC Sion	Glasgow
21:05 CEST		Match Report		Stadium: Celtic Park; Attendance: 51,525; Referee: Marijo Strahonja (Croatia)

25 August 2011 Play-off (2nd leg)	FC Sion	3–1^{1} (3–1 agg.)	Celtic F.C.	Sion
20:30 CEST	Feindouno 3' (pen.), 63'; Sio 22'	Match Report	Mulgrew 78'	Stadium: Stade Tourbillon; Referee: David Fernández Borbalán (Spain)

18 August 2011 Play-off (1st leg)	Celtic F.C.	3–0^{1}	FC Sion	Glasgow
21:05 CEST		Match report		Stadium: Celtic Park; Attendance: 10,145; Referee: Marijo Strahonja (Croatia)

25 August 2011 Play-off (2nd leg)	FC Sion	0–3^{1} (0–6 agg.)	Celtic F.C.	Sion
20:30 CEST	Feindouno 3' (pen.), 63'; Sio 22'	Match report	Mulgrew 78'	Stadium: Stade Tourbillon; Referee: David Fernández Borbalán (Spain)

- 1. FC Sion originally drew 0–0 in the first leg and won 3–1 in the second leg. UEFA overturned the result of both matches. Both matches were awarded 3–0 in favour of Celtic F.C.

== Squad statistics ==
=== Appearances and goals ===
As of 5 July 2012

No.	Pos	Nat	Player	Total		Super League		Playoff		Swiss Cup		Europa League			
No.	Pos	Nat	Player	Apps	Goals	Apps	Goals	Apps	Goals	Apps	Goals	Apps	Goals		
1	GK	(Latvia) LAT	Andris Vanins	38	0	32+0	0	2+0	0	2+0	0	2+0	0		
3	DF	(Brazil) BRA	Aislan	6	0	4+0	0	0+1	0	0+1	0	0+0	0		
4	DF	(Portugal) POR	José Gonçalves	7	0	4+1	0	0+0	0	1+0	0	1+0	0		
5	DF	(Netherlands) NED	Michael Dingsdag	39	1	31+1	0	2+0	0	3+0	1	2+0	0		
6	DF	(Romania) ROU	George Ogăraru	4	0	0+3	0	0+0	0	1+0	0	0+0	0		
7	MF	(Luxembourg) LUX	Mario Mutsch	21	2	10+6	2	0+2	0	1+0	0	1+1	0		
8	MF	(Brazil) BRA	Rodrigo Lacerda Ramos	35	0	17+11	0	1+0	0	4+0	0	0+2	0		
9	FW	(Brazil) BRA	Danilo	16	2	13+0	1	1+0	0	2+0	1	0+0	0		
11	FW	(Cameroon) CMR	Christ Mbondi	3	0	0+2	0	0+0	0	0+0	0	1+0	0	0+0	0
12	FW	(Switzerland) SUI	Danick Yerly	7	2	2+4	2	1+0	0	0+0	0	0+0	0		
13	MF	(Switzerland) SUI	Sébastien Wüthrich	16	1	9+5	1	1+0	0	1+0	0	0+0	0		
14	MF	(Switzerland) SUI	Vullnet Basha	13	0	6+6	0	0+0	0	0+1	0	0+0	0		
15	MF	(Switzerland) SUI	Jonas Elmer	5	1	1+2	0	0+0	0	1+1	1	0+0	0		
16	MF	(Switzerland) SUI	Didier Crettenand	31	2	17+6	1	2+0	0	2+3	1	0+1	0		
18	GK	(Switzerland) SUI	Kevin Fickentscher	5	0	2+0	0	0+0	0	3+0	0	0+0	0		
19	FW	(Serbia) SRB	Dragan Mrđa	12	4	8+1	1	0+2	2	1+0	1	0+0	0		
20	DF	(Hungary) HUN	Vilmos Vanczák	40	12	32+0	10	2+0	0	4+0	2	2+0	0		
21	MF	(France) FRA	Abdoul Yoda	24	4	10+8	2	1+0	0	3+2	2	0+0	0		
22	MF	(Serbia) SRB	Goran Obradović	32	2	22+4	2	1+0	0	3+0	0	2+0	0		
23	MF	(Switzerland) SUI	Xavier Margairaz	17	1	12+3	0	1+1	1	0+0	0	0+0	0		
25	FW	(Democratic Republic of the Congo) COD	Evan Melo	3	0	0+3	0	0+0	0	0+0	0	0+0	0		
26	MF	(Ivory Coast) CIV	Serey Die	38	1	28+2	1	2+0	0	4+0	0	2+0	0		
27	FW	(France) FRA	Geoffrey Tréand	3	0	1+1	0	0+0	0	0+1	0	0+0	0		
28	FW	(Romania) ROU	Cristian Ianu	12	1	6+4	1	1+0	0	1+0	0	0+0	0		
29	MF	(Switzerland) SUI	Florian Berisha	0	0	0+0	0	0+0	0	0+0	0	0+0	0		
30	GK	(Switzerland) SUI	Steven Deana	0	0	0+0	0	0+0	0	0+0	0	0+0	0		
31	DF	(Switzerland) SUI	Arnaud Bühler	38	2	29+0	1	2+0	0	5+0	1	2+0	0		
32	MF	(Switzerland) SUI	Anthony Sauthier	14	0	6+5	0	0+0	0	2+1	0	0+0	0		
33	DF	(Brazil) BRA	Adaílton	34	1	26+1	1	2+0	0	3+0	0	2+0	0		
	DF	(Switzerland) SUI	Branislav Mićić	1	0	0+0	0	0+0	0	0+1	0	0+0	0		
	MF	(Angola) ANG	Joaquim Adão	1	0	0+1	0	0+0	0	0+0	0	0+0	0		
Players away from the club on loan:
9	FW	(Switzerland) SUI	Aleksandar Prijović	7	0	5+1	0	0+0	0	0+0	0	0+1	0		
10	MF	(Switzerland) SUI	Fabrizio Zambrella	12	0	7+5	0	0+0	0	0+0	0	0+0	0		
Players who appeared for Sion no longer at the club:
3	MF	(Spain) ESP	Gabri García	7	0	3+2	0	0+0	0	1+0	0	0+1	0		
12	MF	(France) FRA	Billy Ketkeophomphone	2	0	1+0	0	0+0	0	0+1	0	0+0	0		
13	MF	(Switzerland) SUI	Giovanni Sio	22	8	18+0	7	0+0	0	2+0	0	2+0	1		
14	MF	(Guinea) GUI	Pascal Feindouno	12	6	8+1	3	0+0	0	0+1	1	2+0	2		
17	FW	(Switzerland) SUI	Guilherme Afonso	16	2	4+7	1	0+0	0	3+0	1	2+0	0		
27	MF	(Switzerland) SUI	Stefan Glarner	4	0	0+3	0	0+0	0	1+0	0	0+0	0		

=== Top scorers ===
Place	Position	Nation	Number	Name	Super League	Play Off	Swiss Cup	Europa League	Total
1	DF	(Hungary)	20	Vilmos Vanczák	10	0	2	0	12
2	MF	(Switzerland)	13	Giovanni Sio	7	0	0	1	8
3	MF	(Guinea)	14	Pascal Feindouno	3	0	1	2	6
4	MF	(France)	21	Abdoul Yoda	2	0	2	0	4
4	FW	(Serbia)	19	Dragan Mrđa	1	2	1	0	4
6				Own goal	3	0	0	0	3
7	FW	(Switzerland)	12	Danick Yerly	2	0	0	0	2
7	FW	(Romania)	28	Cristian Ianu	2	0	0	0	2
7	MF	(Serbia)	22	Goran Obradović	2	0	0	0	2
7	MF	(Luxembourg)	7	Mario Mutsch	2	0	0	0	2
7	DF	(Switzerland)	31	Arnaud Bühler	1	0	1	0	2
7	FW	(Brazil)	9	Danilo	1	0	1	0	2
7	MF	(Switzerland)	16	Didier Crettenand	1	0	1	0	2
14	DF	(Brazil)	33	Adaílton	1	0	0	0	1
14	FW	(Switzerland)	17	Guilherme Afonso	1	0	0	0	1
14	MF	(Ivory Coast)	26	Serey Die	1	0	0	0	1
14	MF	(Switzerland)	13	Sébastien Wüthrich	1	0	0	0	1
14	MF	(Switzerland)	23	Xavier Margairaz	0	1	0	0	1
14	MF	(Switzerland)	15	Jonas Elmer	0	0	1	0	1
14	DF	(Netherlands)	5	Michael Dingsdag	0	0	1	0	1
				TOTALS	40	3	12	3	58

=== Disciplinary record ===
Number	Nation	Position	Name	Super League		Play Off		Swiss Cup		Europa League		Total	
Number	Nation	Position	Name	Yellow card	Red card	Yellow card	Red card	Yellow card	Red card	Yellow card	Red card	Yellow card	Red card
1	(Latvia)	GK	Andris Vanins	3	0	0	0	0	0	0	0	3	0
5	(Netherlands)	DF	Michael Dingsdag	11	0	0	0	0	0	2	0	13	0
7	(Luxembourg)	MF	Mario Mutsch	3	0	0	0	1	0	0	0	4	0
8	(Brazil)	MF	Rodrigo Lacerda Ramos	7	0	0	0	0	0	0	0	7	0
9	(Brazil)	FW	Danilo	3	0	0	0	0	0	0	0	3	0
10	(Switzerland)	MF	Fabrizio Zambrella	2	0	0	0	0	0	0	0	2	0
13	(Switzerland)	MF	Giovanni Sio	4	0	0	0	0	0	1	0	5	0
13	(Switzerland)	MF	Sébastien Wüthrich	1	0	0	0	1	0	0	0	2	0
14	(Switzerland)	MF	Vullnet Basha	3	0	0	0	0	0	0	0	3	0
15	(Switzerland)	MF	Jonas Elmer	0	0	0	0	1	0	0	0	1	0
16	(Switzerland)	MF	Didier Crettenand	1	0	0	0	0	0	0	0	1	0
17	(Switzerland)	FW	Guilherme Afonso	1	0	0	0	0	0	0	0	1	0
18	(Switzerland)	GK	Kevin Fickentscher	0	1	0	0	1	0	0	0	1	1
19	(Serbia)	FW	Dragan Mrđa	1	0	2	0	0	0	0	0	3	0
20	(Hungary)	DF	Vilmos Vanczák	6	0	0	0	0	0	0	0	6	0
21	(France)	MF	Abdoul Yoda	3	0	0	0	0	0	0	0	3	0
22	(Serbia)	MF	Goran Obradović	6	1	0	0	1	0	0	0	7	1
23	(Switzerland)	MF	Xavier Margairaz	1	0	1	0	0	0	0	0	2	0
26	(Ivory Coast)	MF	Serey Die	7	0	0	0	0	0	1	0	8	0
28	(Romania)	MF	Cristian Ianu	1	0	0	0	0	0	0	0	1	0
31	(Switzerland)	DF	Arnaud Bühler	5	0	2	0	1	0	0	0	8	0
32	(Switzerland)	MF	Anthony Sauthier	2	0	0	0	1	0	0	0	3	0
33	(Brazil)	DF	Adaílton	11	1	0	0	2	0	1	0	14	1
	(Angola)	MF	Joaquim Adão	1	0	0	0	0	0	0	0	1	0
			TOTALS	83	3	5	0	9	0	5	0	102	3
