= 2012–13 FC Sion season =

Sion
2012–13 season
- Chairman: Christian Constantin
- Manager: Vladimir Petković till June 2012; Sébastien Fournier June - September 2012; Michel Decastel September - October 2012; Pierre-André Schürmann October - December 2012; Víctor Muñoz December 2012 - February 2013; Gennaro Gattuso 25 February 2013 - 13 May 2013; Michel Decastel; 13 May 2013 -
- Stadium: Stade Tourbillon
- Swiss Super League: 6th
- Swiss Cup: Semi-final vs Basel
- Top goalscorer: League: Léo Itaperuna (8); All: Léo Itaperuna (9)
- Highest home attendance: 14,850 vs Basel; 4 August 2012
- Lowest home attendance: 5,800 vs Thun; 22 September 2012 (majority of the stadium was closed due to sanctions by the SFL)
- Average home league attendance: 11,380; 20 December 2012

In the 2012–13 season, Sion competes in the Swiss Super League and the Swiss Cup. In the summer transfer window, they brought in Italian World Cup winner Gennaro Gattuso, as well as Kyle Lafferty (former of Rangers). In addition, they bought an until then unknown Brazilian footballer called Léo Itaperuna from the 5th division Club of Arapongas and another forward Mathieu Manset from Reading. Already signed six months earlier, Oussama Darragi coming from Esperance de Tunis joined the team along with André Marques from Sporting Lisabon.

The 2012–13 season began well with Sion staying at the top till the 8th round. Fournier played with a 4-2-3-1 system.

On 4 September 2012, Manset, Joaquim Adão and Darragi were all disciplined after being found in the early hours of the morning in a Lausanne nightclub the day before Sion's game away to FC Zürich. Manset's contract with the club was canceled, Adão was demoted to the youth team for one month and Darragi was handed a large fine. This huge upset resulted in the resignation of Sebastien Fournier as coach.

Following this change, the results were not as convincing as they were at the beginning. Although Sion scored more goals in the second part of the first half, they ended fourth during the winter break, one point away from 2nd and 5 points from first. This increase in goals was due to the change to a 4-4-2 system with Itaperuna and Laffery as center forwards.

The weak spot during the first half was the absence of a winger on the left side. This was because Yoda and Wüthrich were injured at the beginning of the season and never recovered to their original strength. In addition to that, the defense was not as solid as the years before. That resulted in more goals received as in other seasons. The reasons for that were the transfer of the center back Adaílton to Henan Jianye and the simultaneous injuries of Aislan, Vanczák and Sauthier. Vanczák broke this cheekbone, but did play again after two weeks with a mask as there were no backups available. During that time, Basha (normally a defensive midfielder) played as a fullback at the position of Vanczák, while he moved into the center to his original position as a center back.

== Squad ==
| No. | Name | Nationality | Position | Date of birth (age) | Signed from |
Goalkeepers
| 1 | Andris Vanins | (Latvia) | GK | 30 April 1980 (age 46) | Ventspils |
| 18 | Kevin Fickentscher | (Switzerland) | GK | 6 July 1988 (age 38) | La Chaux-de-Fonds |
| 88 | João Couto | (Brazil) | GK | 4 March 1998 (age 28) | Estagiário |
Defenders
| 3 | Aislan | (Brazil) | CB | 11 January 1988 (age 38) | Guarani |
| 4 | Adaílton | (Brazil) | CB | 14 April 1983 (age 43) | Henan Jianye |
| 5 | André Marques | (Portugal) | CB | 1 August 1987 (age 39) | Sporting CP |
| 15 | Michael Dingsdag | (Netherlands) | CB | 18 October 1982 (age 44) | Heerenveen |
| 20 | Vilmos Vanczák | (Hungary) | CB | 20 June 1983 (age 43) | Újpest |
| 27 | Léo Lacroix | (Switzerland) | CB | 27 February 1992 (age 34) | Trainee |
| 31 | Arnaud Bühler | (Switzerland) | CB | 17 January 1985 (age 41) | Sochaux |
Midfielders
| 2 | Benjamin Kololli | (Switzerland) (Kosovo) | MF | 15 February 1992 (age 34) | Trainee |
| 7 | Sébastien Wüthrich | (Switzerland) | MF | 29 May 1990 (age 36) | Neuchâtel Xamax |
| 8 | Gennaro Gattuso | (Italy) | MF | 9 January 1978 (age 48) | A.C. Milan |
| 10 | Oussama Darragi | (Tunisia) | MF | 3 April 1987 (age 39) | Espérance |
| 14 | Vullnet Basha | (Albania) (Switzerland) | MF | 11 July 1990 (age 36) | Neuchâtel Xamax |
| 16 | Didier Crettenand | (Switzerland) | MF | 24 February 1986 (age 40) | Lausanne-Sport |
| 23 | Xavier Margairaz | (Switzerland) | MF | 7 January 1984 (age 42) | Zürich |
| 26 | Gelson Fernandes | (Switzerland) | MF | 2 July 1986 (age 40) | Loan from Sporting Lisabon |
| 29 | Alberto Regazzoni | (Switzerland) | CB | 4 May 1983 (age 43) | St. Gallen |
| 32 | Anthony Sauthier | (Switzerland) | MF | 5 February 1991 (age 35) | Trainee |
Forwards
| 9 | Abdoul Yoda | (Switzerland) | ST | 25 October 1988 (age 38) | Servette |
| 11 | Léo Itaperuna | (Brazil) | ST | 12 April 1989 (age 37) | Arapongas |
| 12 | Kyle Lafferty | (Northern Ireland) | ST | 16 September 1987 (age 39) | Rangers |
| 21 | Yannick N'Djeng | (Cameroon) | FW | 11 March 1990 (age 36) | Espérance |
| 22 | Dragan Mrđa | (Serbia) | FW | 23 January 1984 (age 42) | Vojvodina |
| 25 | Evan Melo | (Switzerland) | FW | 31 May 1993 (age 33) | Trainee |

=== Out on loan ===
Note: Flags indicate national team as defined under FIFA eligibility rules; some limited exceptions apply. Players may hold more than one non-FIFA nationality.

| No. | Pos. | Nation | Player |
|---|---|---|---|
| 9 | FW | BRA | Danilo (at (Ukraine) Zorya Luhansk) |
| 17 | FW | SUI | Danick Yerly (at Chiasso) |

| No. | Pos. | Nation | Player |
|---|---|---|---|
| 34 | FW | SUI | Aleksandar Prijovic (at (Norway) Tromsø IL) |

== Transfers ==
=== Summer ===
In: Note: Flags indicate national team as defined under FIFA eligibility rules; some limited exceptions apply. Players may hold more than one non-FIFA nationality.

| No. | Pos. | Nation | Player |
|---|---|---|---|
| 5 | DF | POR | André Marques (from (Portugal) Sporting CP) |
| 8 | MF | ITA | Gennaro Gattuso (from (Italy) A.C. Milan) |
| 10 | MF | TUN | Oussama Darragi (from (Tunisia) Espérance) |
| 11 | FW | BRA | Léo Itaperuna (from (Brazil) Arapongas) |
| 12 | FW | NIR | Kyle Lafferty (from (Scotland) Rangers) |
| 19 | FW | FRA | Mathieu Manset (from (England) Reading) |

Out: Note: Flags indicate national team as defined under FIFA eligibility rules; some limited exceptions apply. Players may hold more than one non-FIFA nationality.

| No. | Pos. | Nation | Player |
|---|---|---|---|
| 6 | MF | ROU | George Ogăraru |
| 7 | MF | LUX | Mario Mutsch (to (Switzerland) St. Gallen) |
| 9 | FW | BRA | Danilo (on loan at (Ukraine) Zorya Luhansk) |
| 11 | FW | CMR | Christ Mbondi (on loan at (Thailand) Bangkok Glass F.C.) |
| 17 | FW | SUI | Danick Yerly (on loan at Chiasso) |
| 22 | MF | SRB | Goran Obradović |
| 27 | FW | FRA | Geoffrey Tréand (to (Switzerland) Servette) |
| 28 | FW | ROU | Cristian Ianu (to (Switzerland) Wohlen) |
| 33 | DF | BRA | Adaílton (to (China) Henan Jianye) |
| 34 | FW | SUI | Aleksandar Prijovic (on loan at (Norway) Tromsø IL) |

=== Winter ===
In: Note: Flags indicate national team as defined under FIFA eligibility rules; some limited exceptions apply. Players may hold more than one non-FIFA nationality.

| No. | Pos. | Nation | Player |
|---|---|---|---|
| 4 | DF | BRA | Adaílton (from (China) Henan Jianye) |
| 21 | FW | CMR | Yannick N'Djeng (from (Tunisia) Espérance) |
| 26 | MF | SUI | Gelson Fernandes (on loan from (Portugal) Sporting Lisbon) |
| 29 | MF | SUI | Alberto Regazzoni (from (Switzerland) St. Gallen) |

Out: Note: Flags indicate national team as defined under FIFA eligibility rules; some limited exceptions apply. Players may hold more than one non-FIFA nationality.

| No. | Pos. | Nation | Player |
|---|---|---|---|
| 3 | DF | SUI | José Goncalves (to (United States) New England Revolution) |
| 7 | MF | SUI | Sébastien Wüthrich (loan to (Switzerland) St. Gallen) |
| 19 | FW | FRA | Mathieu Manset (to (England) Carlisle United) |
| 26 | MF | CIV | Serey Die (to (Switzerland) FC Basel) |

== Match results ==
=== Legend ===
Win Draw Loss Void

=== Super League ===
==== Results summary ====
| Overall | | | | | | | | Home | | | | | | Away | | | | | |
| Pld | W | D | L | GF | GA | GD | Pts | W | D | L | GF | GA | GD | W | D | L | GF | GA | GD |
|---|---|---|---|---|---|---|---|---|---|---|---|---|---|---|---|---|---|---|---|
| 36 | 13 | 9 | 14 | 40 | 54 | −14 | 48 | 6 | 6 | 5 | 17 | 20 | −3 | 7 | 3 | 9 | 23 | 34 | −11 |

Last updated: 3 June 2013.
Source: Fussballdaten.de

==== Results ====
| 15 July 2012 1 | Grasshopper | 0 – 2 | Sion | Zürich |
| 13:45 CEST (UTC+2) | | Summary | Léo Itaperuna 39', 77' | Stadium: Letzigrund; Attendance: 7,900; Referee: Stephan Klossner |

| 22 July 2012 2 | Sion | 1 – 0 | Servette | Sion |
| 13:45 CEST (UTC+2) | Manset 86' (pen.) | Summary | | Stadium: Stade Tourbillon; Attendance: 14,500; Referee: Adrien Jaccottet (Basel) |

| 29 July 2012 3 | Luzern | 0 – 3 | Sion | Lucerne |
| 16:00 CEST (UTC+2) | | Summary | Margairaz 29'; Lafferty 90'; Die 90' | Stadium: Swissporarena; Attendance: 13,298; Referee: Cyril Zimmermann |

| 4 August 2012 4 | Sion | 1 – 1 | Basel | Sion |
| 19:45 CEST (UTC+2) | Léo Itaperuna 80' | Summary | Kováč 49' | Stadium: Stade Tourbillon; Attendance: 14,850; Referee: Nikolaj Hänni |

| 11 August 2012 5 | Lausanne-Sport | 0 – 2 | Sion | Lausanne |
| 19:45 CEST (UTC+2) | | Summary | Vanczák 12'; Margairaz 86' | Stadium: Stade Olympique de la Pontaise; Attendance: 8,750; Referee: Ludovic Gremaud |

| 19 August 2012 6 | Sion | 1 – 0 | Young Boys | Sion |
| 13:45 CEST (UTC+2) | Crettenand 23' | Summary | Nuzzolo (red card) 79' | Stadium: Stade Tourbillon; Attendance: 13,500; Referee: Sascha Kever |

| 26 August 2012 7 | Zürich | 1 – 0 | Sion | Zürich |
| 13:45 CEST (UTC+2) | Chiumiento 35' (pen.) | Summary | | Stadium: Letzigrund; Attendance: 11,016; Referee: Daniel Wermelinger |

| 1 September 2012 8 | Sion | 0 – 3 | St. Gallen | Sion |
| 19:45 CEST (UTC+2) | | Summary | Mathys 12', 43'; Scarione 90+3' | Stadium: Stade Tourbillon; Attendance: 13,800; Referee: Sascha Amhof |

| 22 September 2012 9 | Sion | 2 – 1 | Thun | Sion |
| 19:45 CEST (UTC+2) | Itaperuna 14', 61' | Summary | Ngamukol 42' | Stadium: Stade Tourbillon; Attendance: 5,800; Referee: Sascha Kever |

| 26 September 2012 10 | Basel | 4 – 1 | Sion | Basel |
| 20:30 CEST (UTC+2) | P.Degen 42', 55'; Stocker 74'; Sauro 80' | Summary | Gattuso 43' | Stadium: St. Jakob-Park; Attendance: 27,575; Referee: Alain Bieri (Solothurn) |

| 30 September 2012 11 | Sion | 2 – 2 | Zürich | Sion |
| 16:00 CEST (UTC+2) | Lafferty 7'; Margairaz 26' | Summary | Gavranović 46'; Teixeira 90+1' | Stadium: Stade Tourbillon; Attendance: 9,200; Referee: Patrick Graf |

| 7 October 2012 12 | Sion | 3 – 2 | Luzern | Sion |
| 13:45 CEST (UTC+2) | Margairaz 30'; Die (yellow card) 19' (yellow-red card) 32'; Lafferty 38'; Bühler 74' | Summary | Andrist 20' (pen.); Puljić 90' (pen.) | Stadium: Stade Tourbillon; Attendance: 8,850; Referee: Nikolaj Hänni |

| 20 October 2012 13 | Thun | 1 - 1 | Sion | Thun |
| 19:45 CEST (UTC+2) | Ghezal 44' | Summary | Margairaz 85' | Stadium: Arena Thun; Attendance: 5,148; Referee: Sebastien Pache |

| 27 October 2012 14 | Sion | 1 - 1 | Lausanne-Sport | Sion |
| 19:45 CEST (UTC+2) | Vanczák 50' | Summary | Marazzi 81' | Stadium: Stade Tourbillon; Attendance: 8,800; Referee: Ludovic Gremaud |

| 4 November 2012 15 | St. Gallen | 0 - 3 | Sion | St. Gallen |
| 16:00 CET (UTC+1) | Mutsch (red card) 37' | Summary | Bühler 38'; Crettenand 83'; Wüthrich 90+2' | Stadium: AFG Arena; Attendance: 15,241; Referee: Stephan Studer |

| 18 November 2012 16 | Servette | 0 - 2 | Sion | Geneva |
| 13:45 CET (UTC+1) | | Summary | Lafferty 45+1' (pen.); Itaperuna 77' | Stadium: Stade de Genève; Attendance: 11,923; Referee: Damien Carrel |

| 24 November 2012 17 | Sion | 1 - 1 | Grasshopper | Sion |
| 19:45 CET (UTC+1) | Itaperuna 30' | Summary | Gashi 3' | Stadium: Stade Tourbillon; Attendance: 13,200; Referee: Alain Bieri (Solothurn) |

| 2 December 2012 18 | Young Boys | 3 - 1 | Sion | Bern |
| 13:45 CET (UTC+1) | Ojala (red card) 27'; Nef 45+2'; Nuzzolo 79' (pen.), 90+4' | Summary | Dingsdag 29' | Stadium: Stade de Suisse; Attendance: 17,737; Referee: Nikolaj Hänni |

| 9 February 2013 19 | Basel | 3 – 0 | Sion | St. Jakob-Park, Basel |
| 16:00 CET (UTC+1) | Streller 45'; P. Degen (yellow card) 50'; Salah 52'; Stocker 58' | Summary | (yellow card) 44' Gattuso; (yellow card) 50' Dingsdag; (yellow card) 57' Fernandes; (yellow card) 64' 'Djeng | Attendance: 24,265; Referee: Stephan Studer |

| 16 February 2013 20 | Sion | 1 - 0 | St. Gallen | Sion |
| 19:45 CET (UTC+1) | Montandon 64' (o.g.) | Summary | | Stadium: Stade Tourbillon; Attendance: 9,500; Referee: Alain Bieri (Solothurn) |

| 24 February 2013 21 | Thun | 4 - 0 | Sion | Thun |
| 13:45 CET (UTC+1) | Salamand 8'; Ferreira 10'; Schneuwly 35'; Sadik 74' | Summary | | Stadium: Arena Thun; Attendance: 4,374; Referee: Sascha Kever |

| 2 March 2013 22 | Zürich | 3 - 1 | Sion | Zürich |
| 19:45 CET (UTC+1) | Drmić 13', 63'; Schönbächler 38' | Summary | N'Djeng 61' | Stadium: Letzigrund; Attendance: 8,325; Referee: Stephan Klossner |

| 10 March 2013 23 | Sion | 0 - 1 | Lausanne-Sport | Sion |
| 13:45 CET (UTC+1) | Basha (yellow card) 31' (red card) 41' | Summary | Malonga 14' | Stadium: Stade Tourbillon; Attendance: 9,300; Referee: Patrick Graf |

| 17 March 2013 24 | Young Boys | 0 - 0 | Sion | Bern |
| 13:45 CET (UTC+1) | | Summary | | Stadium: Stade de Suisse; Attendance: 15,173; Referee: Sascha Amhof |

| 30 March 2013 25 | Sion | 1 - 1 | Servette | Sion |
| 17:45 CET (UTC+1) | Itaperuna 61'; Adaílton (yellow card) 23' (yellow-red card) 63' | Summary | De Azevedo 77' | Stadium: Stade Tourbillon; Attendance: 11,800; Referee: Alain Bieri (Solothurn) |

| 6 April 2013 26 | Sion | 2 - 1 | Luzern | Sion |
| 19:45 CEST (UTC+2) | Lacroix 27'; Lafferty 67' | Summary | Wiss 51' | Stadium: Stade Tourbillon; Attendance: 9,800; Referee: Patrick Graf |

| 14 April 2013 27 | Grasshopper | 1 - 1 | Sion | Zürich |
| 16:00 CEST (UTC+2) | Feltscher 37' | Summary | Yoda 66' | Stadium: Letzigrund; Attendance: 6,700; Referee: Stephan Studer |

| 21 April 2013 28 | Sion | 0 - 0 | Young Boys | Sion |
| 16:00 CEST (UTC+2) | | Summary | | Stadium: Stade Tourbillon; Attendance: 9,100; Referee: Adrien Jaccottet (Basel) |

| 27 April 2013 29 | Servette | Postponed | Sion | Geneva |
| 19:45 CEST (UTC+2) | | Summary | | Stadium: Stade de Genève; Referee: Stephan Klossner |

| 5 May 2013 30 | Sion | 0 - 1 | Basel | Sion |
| 13:45 CEST (UTC+2) | Dingsdag (yellow card) 51' (yellow-red card) 90+3' | Summary | Díaz 44' | Stadium: Stade Tourbillon; Attendance: 9,500; Referee: Sascha Kever |

| 8 May 2013 31 | Lausanne-Sport | 1 - 3 | Sion | Lausanne |
| 19:45 CEST (UTC+2) | Sonnerat 28' | Summary | N'Djeng 17' (pen.); Kololli 43'; Darragi 74' | Stadium: Stade Olympique de la Pontaise; Attendance: 5,200; Referee: Alain Bieri (Solothurn) |

| 11 May 2013 32 | St. Gallen | 5 - 0 | Sion | St. Gallen |
| 19:45 CEST (UTC+2) | Wüthrich 10'; Scarione 16', 27', 68' (pen.); Jagne 89' | Summary | | Stadium: AFG Arena; Attendance: 13,274; Referee: Sascha Amhof |

| 16 May 2013 33 | Sion | 0 - 4 | Grasshopper | Sion |
| 19:45 CEST (UTC+2) | | Summary | Gashi 25'; Zuber 33'; Ngamukol 64'; Brahimi 90+1' | Stadium: Stade Tourbillon; Attendance: 6,800; Referee: Stephan Klossner |

| 22 May 2013 29 | Servette | 4 - 0 | Sion | Geneva |
| 19:45 CEST (UTC+2) | Vitkieviez 2'; Tréand 19'; Karanović 55', 68' | Summary | | Stadium: Stade de Genève; Attendance: 10,622; Referee: Stephan Klossner |

| 25 May 2013 34 | Sion | 0 - 1 | Thun | Sion |
| 17:45 CEST (UTC+2) | André Marques (yellow card) 55' (yellow-red card) 83' | Summary | Schneuwly 58' | Stadium: Stade Tourbillon; Attendance: 8,200; Referee: Nikolaj Hänni |

| 29 May 2013 35 | Luzern | 2 - 0 | Sion | Lucerne |
| 20:30 CEST (UTC+2) | Gygax 17', 84'; Stahel (yellow card) 29' | Summary | Adaílton (yellow card) 12'; Darragi (yellow card) 77'; N'Djeng (yellow card) 78'; Margairaz (yellow card) 89' | Stadium: Swissporarena; Attendance: 11,724; Referee: Patrick Graf |

| 1 June 2013 36 | Sion | 4 - 2 | Zürich | Sion |
| 20:30 CEST (UTC+2) | Vanczák 54'; Kololli 61'; Karlen 73'; Veloso 86' | Summary | Gavranović 50'; Drmić 56' | Stadium: Stade Tourbillon; Attendance: 6,200; Referee: Alain Bieri (Solothurn) |

=== Swiss Cup ===
| 16 September 2012 First Round | FC Richemond | 0 - 1 | Sion | Fribourg |
| 15:30 CEST (UTC+2) | | | Die 22' | Stadium: St. Leonard Stadion |

| 11 November 2012 Second Round | FC Hergiswil | 0 - 3 | Sion | Hergiswil |
| 14:30 CET (UTC+1) | | | Margairaz 25'; Itaperuna 34'; Lafferty 89' | Stadium: Sportplatz Grossmatt |

| 3 February 2013 Third Round | SC Kriens | 0 - 4 | Sion | Kriens |
| 14:30 CET (UTC+1) | | | Lafferty 25', 38'; N'Djeng 83'; Mrđa 90' | Stadium: Stadion Kleinfeld; Attendance: 1,500; Referee: Nikolaj Hänni |

| 27 February 2013 Quarter-final | FC Lausanne-Sport | 0 – 2 | Sion | Lausanne |
| 20:30 CET (UTC+1) | | Summary | Vanczák 28'; N'Djeng 90+4' (pen.) | Stadium: Stade Olympique de la Pontaise; Attendance: 4,000; Referee: Adrien Jaccottet |

| 17 April 2013 Semi-final | Sion | 0 - 1 | FC Basel | Sion |
| 20:45 CET (UTC+1) | | Summary | Stocker 73' | Stadium: Stade Tourbillon |

== Squad statistics ==
As of 3 June 2013

=== Appearances and goals ===
| No. | Pos | Nat | Player | Total | | Super League | | Swiss Cup | |
| No. | Pos | Nat | Player | Apps | Goals | Apps | Goals | Apps | Goals |
|---|---|---|---|---|---|---|---|---|---|
| 1 | GK | (Latvia) LAT | Andris Vanins | 39 | 0 | 36+0 | 0 | 3+0 | 0 |
| 2 | MF | (Switzerland) SUI | Benjamin Kololli | 7 | 2 | 5+2 | 2 | 0+0 | 0 |
| 3 | DF | (Brazil) BRA | Aislan | 15 | 0 | 13+1 | 0 | 0+1 | 0 |
| 4 | DF | (Brazil) BRA | Adaílton | 15 | 0 | 14+0 | 0 | 1+0 | 0 |
| 5 | DF | (Portugal) POR | André Marques | 23 | 0 | 14+7 | 0 | 1+1 | 0 |
| 6 | MF | (Angola) ANG | Joaquim Adão | 12 | 0 | 0+12 | 0 | 0+0 | 0 |
| 8 | MF | (Italy) ITA | Gennaro Gattuso | 29 | 1 | 25+2 | 1 | 2+0 | 0 |
| 9 | MF | (Switzerland) SUI | Abdoul Yoda | 7 | 1 | 2+5 | 1 | 0+0 | 0 |
| 10 | MF | (Tunisia) TUN | Oussama Darragi | 24 | 1 | 20+4 | 1 | 0+0 | 0 |
| 11 | FW | (Brazil) BRA | Léo Itaperuna | 36 | 9 | 25+8 | 8 | 3+0 | 1 |
| 12 | FW | (Northern Ireland) NIR | Kyle Lafferty | 27 | 8 | 16+9 | 5 | 2+0 | 3 |
| 14 | MF | (Albania) ALB | Vullnet Basha | 27 | 0 | 18+6 | 0 | 3+0 | 0 |
| 15 | DF | (Netherlands) NED | Michael Dingsdag | 32 | 1 | 29+0 | 1 | 3+0 | 0 |
| 16 | MF | (Switzerland) SUI | Didier Crettenand | 30 | 2 | 19+8 | 2 | 1+2 | 0 |
| 17 | FW | (Switzerland) SUI | Matteo Fedele | 4 | 0 | 1+3 | 0 | 0+0 | 0 |
| 19 | FW | (Switzerland) SUI | Gaëtan Karlen | 3 | 1 | 0+3 | 1 | 0+0 | 0 |
| 20 | DF | (Hungary) HUN | Vilmos Vanczák | 32 | 3 | 29+1 | 3 | 2+0 | 0 |
| 21 | FW | (Cameroon) CMR | Yannick N'Djeng | 17 | 3 | 13+3 | 2 | 1+0 | 1 |
| 22 | FW | (Serbia) SRB | Dragan Mrđa | 6 | 1 | 0+5 | 0 | 0+1 | 1 |
| 23 | MF | (Switzerland) SUI | Xavier Margairaz | 22 | 6 | 17+3 | 5 | 2+0 | 1 |
| 24 | MF | (Portugal) POR | Max Veloso | 3 | 1 | 3+0 | 1 | 0+0 | 0 |
| 25 | FW | (Switzerland) SUI | Evan Melo | 3 | 0 | 1+1 | 0 | 0+1 | 0 |
| 26 | MF | (Switzerland) SUI | Gelson Fernandes | 15 | 0 | 14+0 | 0 | 1+0 | 0 |
| 27 | DF | (Switzerland) SUI | Léo Lacroix | 9 | 1 | 9+0 | 1 | 0+0 | 0 |
| 29 | MF | (Switzerland) SUI | Alberto Regazzoni | 11 | 0 | 9+2 | 0 | 0+0 | 0 |
| 31 | DF | (Switzerland) SUI | Arnaud Bühler | 36 | 2 | 33+0 | 2 | 3+0 | 0 |
| 32 | MF | (Switzerland) SUI | Anthony Sauthier | 17 | 0 | 9+5 | 0 | 3+0 | 0 |
| 33 | FW | (Switzerland) SUI | Edimilson Fernandes | 1 | 0 | 1+0 | 0 | 0+0 | 0 |
| 34 | MF | (Senegal) SEN | Ndoye Birama | 3 | 0 | 3+0 | 0 | 0+0 | 0 |
Players away from the club on loan:
| 7 | MF | (Switzerland) SUI | Sébastien Wüthrich | 14 | 1 | 3+10 | 1 | 1+0 | 0 |
| 9 | FW | (Brazil) BRA | Danilo | 0 | 0 | 0+0 | 0 | 0+0 | 0 |
| 17 | FW | (Switzerland) SUI | Danick Yerly | 0 | 0 | 0+0 | 0 | 0+0 | 0 |
| 34 | FW | (Switzerland) SUI | Aleksandar Prijovic | 0 | 0 | 0+0 | 0 | 0+0 | 0 |
Players who appeared for Sion no longer at the club:
| 4 | DF | (Portugal) POR | José Gonçalves | 1 | 0 | 0+1 | 0 | 0+0 | 0 |
| 19 | FW | (France) FRA | Mathieu Manset | 5 | 1 | 2+3 | 1 | 0+0 | 0 |
| 26 | MF | (Ivory Coast) CIV | Serey Die | 12 | 2 | 9+2 | 1 | 1+0 | 1 |

=== Top scorers ===
| Place | Position | Nation | Number | Name | Super League | Swiss Cup | Total |
|---|---|---|---|---|---|---|---|
| 1 | FW | (Brazil) | 11 | Léo Itaperuna | 8 | 1 | 9 |
| 2 | FW | (Northern Ireland) | 12 | Kyle Lafferty | 5 | 3 | 8 |
| 3 | MF | (Switzerland) | 23 | Xavier Margairaz | 5 | 1 | 6 |
| 4 | DF | (Hungary) | 20 | Vilmos Vanczák | 3 | 0 | 3 |
| 4 | FW | (Cameroon) | 21 | Yannick N'Djeng | 2 | 1 | 3 |
| 6 | DF | (Switzerland) | 31 | Arnaud Bühler | 2 | 0 | 2 |
| 6 | MF | (Switzerland) | 16 | Didier Crettenand | 2 | 0 | 2 |
| 6 | MF | (Switzerland) | 2 | Benjamin Kololli | 2 | 0 | 2 |
| 6 | MF | (Ivory Coast) | 26 | Serey Die | 1 | 1 | 2 |
| 10 | FW | (France) | 19 | Mathieu Manset | 1 | 0 | 1 |
| 10 | MF | (Italy) | 8 | Gennaro Gattuso | 1 | 0 | 1 |
| 10 | MF | (Switzerland) | 7 | Sébastien Wüthrich | 1 | 0 | 1 |
| 10 | DF | (Netherlands) | 15 | Michael Dingsdag | 1 | 0 | 1 |
| 10 | DF | (Switzerland) | 27 | Léo Lacroix | 1 | 0 | 1 |
| 10 | MF | (Switzerland) | 9 | Abdoul Yoda | 1 | 0 | 1 |
| 10 | MF | (Tunisia) | 10 | Oussama Darragi | 1 | 0 | 1 |
| 10 | MF | (Portugal) | 24 | Max Veloso | 1 | 0 | 1 |
| 10 | FW | (Switzerland) | 19 | Gaëtan Karlen | 1 | 0 | 1 |
| 10 | FW | (Serbia) | 22 | Dragan Mrđa | 0 | 1 | 1 |
| 10 | Own goal | | | | 1 | 0 | 1 |
| | | | | TOTALS | 40 | 8 | 48 |

=== Disciplinary record ===
| Number | Nation | Position | Name | Super League | | Swiss Cup | | Total | |
| Number | Nation | Position | Name | Yellow card | Red card | Yellow card | Red card | Yellow card | Red card |
| 1 | (Latvia) | GK | Andris Vanins | 3 | 0 | 0 | 0 | 3 | 0 |
| 3 | (Brazil) | DF | Aislan | 4 | 0 | 0 | 0 | 4 | 0 |
| 4 | (Brazil) | DF | Adaílton | 1 | 0 | 0 | 0 | 1 | 0 |
| 4 | (Portugal) | DF | José Gonçalves | 3 | 1 | 0 | 0 | 3 | 1 |
| 5 | (Portugal) | DF | André Marques | 4 | 1 | 1 | 0 | 5 | 1 |
| 7 | (Switzerland) | MF | Sébastien Wüthrich | 1 | 0 | 0 | 0 | 1 | 0 |
| 8 | (Italy) | MF | Gennaro Gattuso | 11 | 0 | 0 | 0 | 11 | 0 |
| 10 | (Tunisia) | MF | Oussama Darragi | 7 | 0 | 0 | 0 | 7 | 0 |
| 11 | (Brazil) | FW | Léo Itaperuna | 6 | 0 | 0 | 0 | 6 | 0 |
| 12 | (Northern Ireland) | FW | Kyle Lafferty | 10 | 0 | 1 | 0 | 11 | 0 |
| 14 | (Albania) | MF | Vullnet Basha | 6 | 1 | 0 | 0 | 6 | 1 |
| 15 | (Netherlands) | DF | Michael Dingsdag | 9 | 1 | 0 | 0 | 9 | 1 |
| 16 | (Switzerland) | MF | Didier Crettenand | 1 | 0 | 0 | 0 | 1 | 0 |
| 19 | (France) | FW | Mathieu Manset | 1 | 0 | 0 | 0 | 1 | 0 |
| 20 | (Hungary) | DF | Vilmos Vanczák | 8 | 0 | 0 | 0 | 8 | 0 |
| 21 | (Cameroon) | FW | Yannick N'Djeng | 3 | 0 | 0 | 0 | 3 | 0 |
| 23 | (Switzerland) | MF | Xavier Margairaz | 7 | 0 | 0 | 0 | 7 | 0 |
| 26 | (Switzerland) | MF | Gelson Fernandes | 4 | 0 | 1 | 0 | 5 | 0 |
| 26 | (Ivory Coast) | MF | Serey Die | 4 | 1 | 0 | 0 | 4 | 1 |
| 27 | (Switzerland) | DF | Léo Lacroix | 1 | 0 | 0 | 0 | 1 | 0 |
| 29 | (Switzerland) | MF | Alberto Regazzoni | 2 | 0 | 0 | 0 | 2 | 0 |
| 31 | (Switzerland) | DF | Arnaud Bühler | 1 | 0 | 0 | 0 | 1 | 0 |
| 32 | (Switzerland) | MF | Anthony Sauthier | 1 | 0 | 0 | 0 | 1 | 0 |
| | | | TOTALS | 96 | 5 | 3 | 0 | 99 | 5 |
