= 2013–14 FC Sion season =

Sion
2013–14 season
- Chairman: Christian Constantin
- Manager: Laurent Roussey; 23 October 2013 -
- Stadium: Stade Tourbillon
- Swiss Super League: 8th
- Swiss Cup: 3rd round

In the 2013–14 season, Sion competed in the Swiss Super League and the Swiss Cup. In the summer transfer window 2013, the chairman promoted 7 U21 players to the 1st Team. To bring stability and experience in they bought Vincent Rüfli and Xavier Kouassi from Servette FC, Pa Modou Jagne replacing Arnaud Bühler, twenty-one-year-old Freddy Mveng, Demitris Christofi as a winger and Ismael Yartey on loan as well as Beg Ferati and Ovidiu Herea.

The 2013–14 season began rather poorly with Sion not scoring a goal until the 7th round and setting a new record in the Swiss Super League for the lowest scoring season start. Decastel played with a 4-2-3-1 system.

== Squad ==
No.	Name	Nationality	Position	Date of birth (age)	Signed from
Goalkeepers
1	Andris Vanins	(Latvia)	GK	30 April 1980 (age 45)	Ventspils
18	Steven Deana	(Switzerland)	GK	4 March 1990 (age 35)	Vaduz
30	Mathieu Debonnaire	(Switzerland)	GK	26 April 1987 (age 38)	FC Lausanne-Sport
Defenders
4	Milos Bakrac	(Montenegro)	CB	25 February 1992 (age 33)	Trainee
5	André Marques	(Portugal)	LB	1 August 1987 (age 38)	Sporting CP
13	Mathieu Debons	(Switzerland)	LB	21 September 1992 (age 33)	Trainee
17	Pa Modou Jagne	(The Gambia)	LB	26 December 1989 (age 36)	FC St. Gallen
20	Vilmos Vanczák	(Hungary)	RB	20 June 1983 (age 42)	Újpest
22	Vincent Rüfli	(Switzerland)	RB	22 January 1988 (age 38)	Servette FC
27	Léo Lacroix	(Switzerland)	CB	27 February 1992 (age 33)	Trainee
28	Beg Ferati	(Switzerland)	CB	10 November 1986 (age 39)	SC Freiburg
32	Arnaud Bühler	(Switzerland)	LB	17 January 1985 (age 41)	SC Freiburg
Midfielders
2	Benjamin Kololli	(Switzerland) (Kosovo)	MF	15 February 1992 (age 33)	Trainee
6	Xavier Kouassi	(Ivory Coast)	MF	28 December 1989 (age 36)	Servette FC
7	Demetris Christofi	(Cyprus)	MF	28 September 1988 (age 37)	Omonia Nicosia
8	Vullnet Basha	(Albania) (Switzerland)	MF	11 July 1990 (age 35)	Neuchâtel Xamax
10	Ovidiu Herea	(Romania)	MF	26 March 1985 (age 40)	Rapid București
14	Freddy Mveng	(Switzerland)	MF	29 May 1992 (age 33)	BSC Young Boys
15	Ismael Yartey	(Ghana)	MF	11 January 1990 (age 36)	Loan From FC Sochaux
16	Matteo Fedele	(Switzerland)	MF	20 July 1992 (age 33)	Trainee
23	Dario Vidosic	(Australia)	MF	8 April 1987 (age 38)	Adelaide United FC
24	Max Veloso	(Switzerland)	MF	27 March 1992 (age 33)	Neuchatel Xamax
34	Ndoye Birama	(Senegal)	MF	17 April 1994 (age 31)	Trainee
Forwards
9	Fousseyni Cissé	(France)	ST	17 July 1989 (age 36)	Le Mans FC
11	Léo Itaperuna	(Brazil)	ST	12 April 1989 (age 36)	Arapongas
19	Gaetan Karlen	(Switzerland)	FW	6 July 1993 (age 32)	Trainee
21	Ebenezer Assifuah	(Ghana)	FW	3 July 1993 (age 32)	Liberty Professionals F.C.

=== Out on loan ===
Note: Flags indicate national team as defined under FIFA eligibility rules; some limited exceptions apply. Players may hold more than one non-FIFA nationality.

No.	Pos.	Nation	Player
17	FW	SUI	Danick Yerly (at (Switzerland) Chiasso)
16	MF	SUI	Joaquim Adao (at (Switzerland) Chiasso)
4	DF	BRA	Adaílton (at (Switzerland) FC Chiasso)
18	GK	SUI	Kevin Fickentscher (at (Switzerland) FC Lausanne-Sport)
34	DF	SUI	Anthony Sauthier (at (Switzerland) Servette FC)

== Transfers ==
=== Summer ===
In: Note: Flags indicate national team as defined under FIFA eligibility rules; some limited exceptions apply. Players may hold more than one non-FIFA nationality.

No.	Pos.	Nation	Player
30	GK	SUI	Mathieu Debonnaire (from (Switzerland) FC Lausanne-Sport)
17	DF	GAM	Pa Modou Jagne (from (Switzerland) FC St.Gallen)
22	DF	SUI	Vincent Rufli (from (Switzerland) Servette FC)
28	DF	SUI	Beg Ferati (from (Germany) SC Freiburg)
31	DF	ARG	Emiliano Dudar (from (Switzerland) FC Chiasso)
6	MF	CIV	Xavier Kouassi (from (Switzerland) Servette FC)
10	MF	ROU	Ovidiu Herea (from (Romania) București)
14	MF	SUI	Freddy Mveng (from (Switzerland) BSC Young Boys)
15	MF	GHA	Ishmael Yartey (from (France) FC Sochaux)
7	FW	CYP	Demitris Christofi (from (Cyprus) Omonia Nicosia)
21	FW	GHA	Ebenezer Assifuah (from (Ghana) Liberty Professionals F.C.)
23	MF	AUS	Dario Vidosic (from (Australia) Adelaide United FC)

Out: Note: Flags indicate national team as defined under FIFA eligibility rules; some limited exceptions apply. Players may hold more than one non-FIFA nationality.

No.	Pos.	Nation	Player
3	DF	BRA	Aislan
6	MF	SUI	Joaoquim Adao (on loan at (Switzerland) Chiasso)
8	MF	ITA	Gennaro Gattuso (Retired, Manager at Palermo)
9	FW	BRA	Danilo ( (Ukraine) Zorya Luhansk)
10	MF	TUN	Ousamma Darragi ( (Tunisia) Espérance de Tunis)
11	FW	CMR	Yannick N'Djeng ( (Tunisia) Espérance de Tunis)
12	FW	NIR	Kyle Lafferty ( (Italy) US Palermo)
15	DF	NED	Michael Dingsdag
16	MF	SUI	Didier Crettenand ( (Switzerland) Servette)
17	FW	SUI	Danick Yerly (on loan at (Switzerland) Chiasso)
18	GK	SUI	Kevin Fickentscher (on loan at (Switzerland) Lausanne)
21	MF	FRA	Karim Yoda
22	MF	SRB	Dragan Mrdja
24	MF	SUI	Xavier Margairaz
25	MF	SUI	Evan Melo
32	MF	SUI	Anthony Sauthier ( (Switzerland) Servette)
33	DF	BRA	Adaílton (to (Switzerland) Chiasso)
34	FW	SUI	Aleksandar Prijovic ( (Sweden) Djurgården)
