= Steven Deana =

Swiss footballer (born 1990)

Personal information
- Date of birth: 4 March 1990 (age 36)
- Place of birth: Wetzikon, Switzerland
- Height: 1.90 m (6 ft 3 in)
- Position: Goalkeeper

Youth career
- 1999–2003: FC Wetzikon
- 2003–2004: FC Effretikon
- 2004–2005: FC Winterthur
- 2005–2007: Grasshoppers B

Senior career*
Years	Team	Apps	(Gls)
2007–2009	Grasshoppers	22	(0)
2009–2010	FC Vaduz	5	(0)
2010–2016	FC Sion	12	(0)
2015–2016	→ FC Aarau (loan)	28	(0)
2016–2017	FC Wil	33	(0)
2017–2019	FC Aarau	31	(0)
2019–2021	MSV Duisburg	0	(0)
2021–2023	Servette FC	0	(0)
2023	FC Lugano	3	(0)
2024	Grasshoppers	1	(0)

International career
2008–2009	Switzerland U19	2	(0)
2012	Switzerland U21	1	(0)
- * Club domestic league appearances and goals as of 31 May 2024

Steven Deana (born 4 March 1990) is a Swiss professional footballer who plays as a goalkeeper, most recently for Swiss Super League side Grasshopper Club Zürich.

== Career ==
Deana began his career with FC Wetzikon and joined FC Effretikon in summer 2003. After only one season with Effretikon, he was scouted from FC Winterthur in June 2005. Shortly after, he left Winterthur to sign a youth contract with Grasshopper Club Zürich.

On 21 June 2009, he left Grasshoppers of the Swiss Super League and signed his first professional contract with the Liechtensteiner club FC Vaduz.

He moved MSV Duisburg on 29 August 2019. He left Duisburg at the end of the 2020–21 season. Afterwards, he joined Servette FC.

On 15 February 2024, he joined Grasshopper Club Zürich for the remainder of the season to compensate for the injury of backup goalkeeper Manuel Kuttin. He departed the club again on 19 June 2024, following the end of the season. He made a single appearance for Grasshoppers, a 0–1 home loss to his previous club FC Lugano.

== Career statistics ==
As of 6 March 2020

Appearances and goals by club, season and competition
Club	Season	Division	League		Cup		Continental		Total	
Club	Season	Division	Apps	Goals	Apps	Goals	Apps	Goals	Apps	Goals
FC Vaduz	2009–10	Swiss Challenge League	5	0	—		—		5	0
FC Sion	2010–11	Swiss Super League	0	0	—		—		0	0
FC Sion	2011–12	Swiss Super League	0	0	—		—		0	0
FC Sion	2012–13	Swiss Super League	0	0	—		—		0	0
FC Sion	2013–14	Swiss Super League	1	0	—		—		1	0
FC Sion	2014–15	Swiss Super League	11	0	2	0	—		13	0
FC Sion	Total		12	0	2	0	—		14	0
FC Aarau (loan)	2015–16	Swiss Challenge League	28	0	1	0	—		29	0
FC Wil	2016–17	Swiss Challenge League	33	0	—		—		33	0
FC Aarau	2017–18	Swiss Challenge League	28	0	—		—		28	0
FC Aarau	2018–19	Swiss Challenge League	3	0	—		—		3	0
FC Aarau	Total		31	0	—		—		31	0
MSV Duisburg	2019–20	3. Liga	0	0	—		—		0	0
MSV Duisburg	2020–21	3. Liga	0	0	0	0	—		0	0
MSV Duisburg	Total		0	0	0	0	—		0	0
Career total			109	0	3	0	—		112	0

== Honours ==
2009: 71st Blue Stars/FIFA Youth Cup "best Goalkeeper Award"
