= Benjamin Kololli =

Kosovan footballer (born 1992)

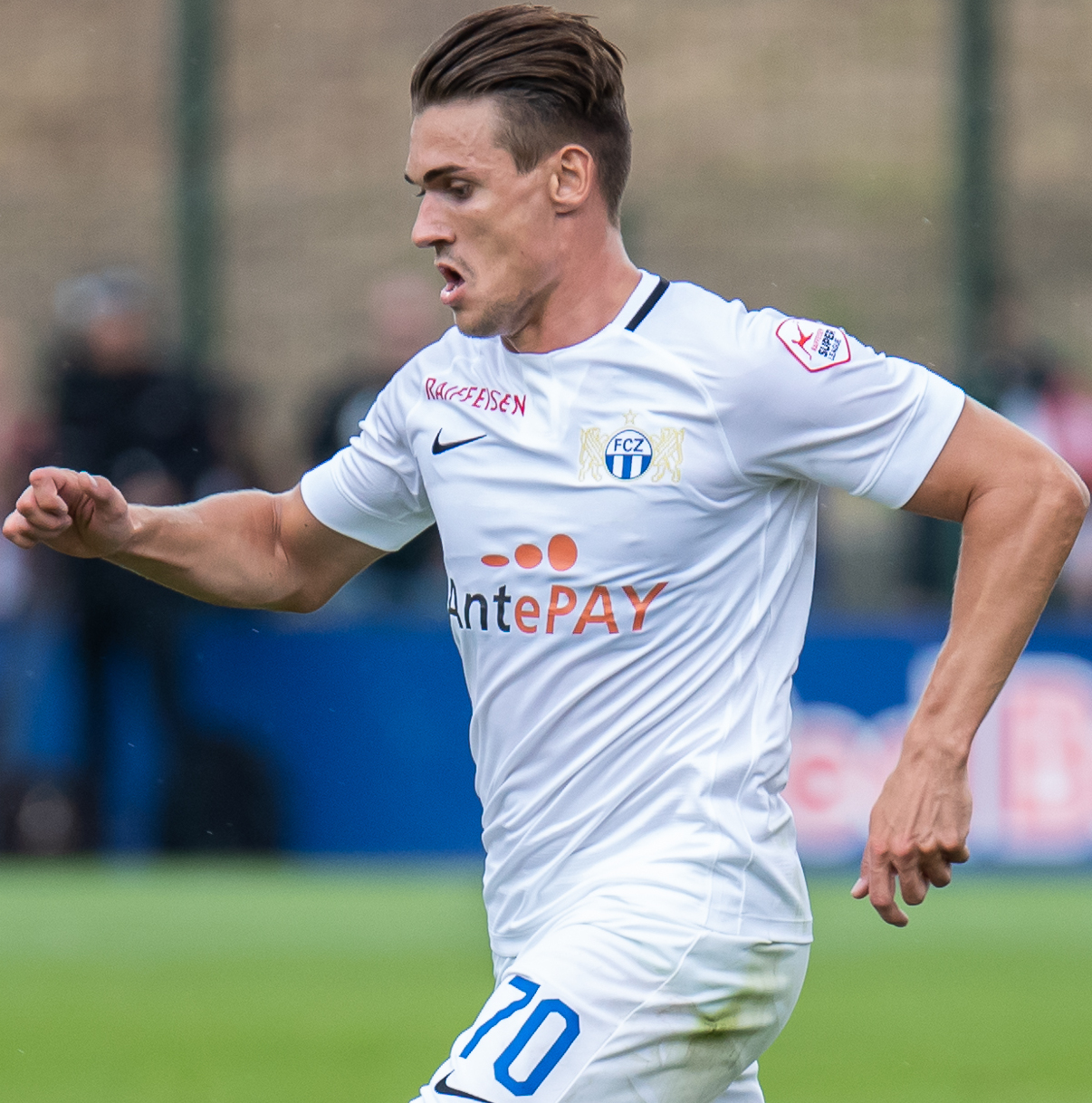
- Kololli with Zürich in 2019

Personal information
- Date of birth: 15 May 1992 (age 34)
- Place of birth: Aigle, Switzerland
- Height: 1.84 m (6 ft 0 in)
- Position: Winger

Team information
- Current team: Sion
- Number: 10

Youth career
- Bex
- –2009: Monthey

Senior career*
Years	Team	Apps	(Gls)
2009–2011	Monthey	11	(6)
2011–2014	Sion U21	45	(11)
2013–2015	Sion	16	(2)
2014–2015	→ Le Mont (loan)	28	(6)
2015–2016	Biel-Bienne	17	(6)
2016	→ Young Boys (loan)	1	(0)
2016–2018	Lausanne-Sport	55	(18)
2018–2021	Zürich	78	(22)
2021–2024	Shimizu S-Pulse	28	(3)
2024	Basel	19	(2)
2025–	Sion	48	(15)

International career
2016–2022	Kosovo	24	(4)
- * Club domestic league appearances and goals as of 28 September 2026

Benjamin Kololli (born 15 May 1992) is a professional footballer who plays as a winger for Swiss Super League club Sion. Born in Switzerland, he represented Kosovo national team.

== Club career ==
=== Zürich ===
On 21 July 2018, Kololli signed a three-year contract with Swiss Super League club Zürich. Seven days later, he made his debut in a 0–2 away win against Grasshoppers after coming on as a substitute at 70th minute in place of Marco Schönbächler.

=== Shimizu S-Pulse ===
On 14 July 2021, Kololli signed a two-and-a-half-year contract with J1 League club Shimizu S-Pulse. Nine days later, the club confirmed that Kololli's transfer was permanent and he received squad number 32. On 18 August 2021, he made his debut with Shimizu S-Pulse in the 2021 Emperor's Cup fourth round against Kawasaki Frontale after coming on as a substitute at 46th minute in place of Keita Nakamura.

At the end of the 2022 season, he and the club were relegated to the second division as second to last in the league table.

=== Basel ===
On 26 December 2023, FC Basel announced that they had signed Kololli on a free transfer and that he had signed a two-and-a-half-year contract, which contained an option for another year.

=== Sion ===
On 27 December 2024, FC Sion announced the signing of Kololli, starting from 1 January 2025.

== International career ==
On 30 August 2016, Kololli received a call-up from Kosovo for a 2018 FIFA World Cup qualification match against Finland. On 12 November 2016, he made his debut with Kosovo in a 2018 FIFA World Cup qualification against Turkey after being named in the starting line-up.

== Personal life ==
Kololli was born in Aigle, Switzerland from Kosovan parents from Lipjan.

== Career statistics ==
=== Club ===
As of 18 August 2021

Appearances and goals by club, season and competition
Club	Season	League			Cup		Continental		Total	
Club	Season	Division	Apps	Goals	Apps	Goals	Apps	Goals	Apps	Goals
Monthey	2011–12	Swiss 1. Liga	11	6	1	0	—		12	6
Sion U21	2011–12	Swiss 1. Liga	8	1	0	0	—		8	1
Sion U21	2012–13	Swiss Promotion League	26	3	0	0	—		26	3
Sion U21	2013–14	Swiss Promotion League	11	7	0	0	—		11	7
Sion U21	Total		56	17	1	0	—		57	17
Sion	2012–13	Swiss Super League	7	2	0	0	—		7	2
Sion	2013–14	Swiss Super League	9	0	2	0	—		11	0
Le Mont (loan)	2014–15	Swiss Challenge League	28	6	1	0	—		29	6
Le Mont (loan)	Total		44	8	3	0	—		47	8
Biel-Bienne	2015–16	Swiss Challenge League	17	6	2	4	—		19	10
Young Boys (loan)	2015–16	Swiss Super League	1	0	0	0	—		1	0
Young Boys (loan)	Total		18	6	2	4	—		20	10
Lausanne-Sport	2016–17	Swiss Super League	26	8	1	0	—		27	8
Lausanne-Sport	2017–18	Swiss Super League	29	10	3	2	—		32	12
Lausanne-Sport	Total		55	18	4	2	—		59	20
Zürich	2018–19	Swiss Super League	30	10	4	2	7	2	41	14
Zürich	2019–20	Swiss Super League	27	6	2	0	—		29	6
Zürich	2020–21	Swiss Super League	21	6	1	0	—		22	6
Zürich	Total		78	22	7	2	7	2	92	26
Shimizu S-Pulse	2021	J1 League	8	0	1	0	—		9	0
Career total			251	71	18	8	7	2	276	81

=== International ===
National team	Year	Apps	Goals
Kosovo
Kosovo	2016	1	0
Kosovo	2017	2	0
Kosovo	2018	6	3
Kosovo	2019	7	0
Kosovo	2020	4	1
Kosovo	2021	3	0
Kosovo	2022	1	0
Total		24	4

==== International goals ====
Scores and results list Kosovo's goal tally first.

No.	Date	Venue	Opponent	Score	Result	Competition	Ref.
1.	11 October 2018	Fadil Vokrri Stadium, Pristina, Kosovo	Malta	1–0	3–1	2018–19 UEFA Nations League D	
2.	11 October 2018	Fadil Vokrri Stadium, Pristina, Kosovo	Malta	3–1	3–1	2018–19 UEFA Nations League D	
3.	17 November 2018	National Stadium, Ta' Qali, Malta	Malta	2–0	5–0	2018–19 UEFA Nations League D	
4.	3 September 2020	Stadio Ennio Tardini, Parma, Italy	Moldova	1–1	1–1	2020–21 UEFA Nations League C	

== Honours ==
Individual

- Swiss Super League Team of the Year: 2018–19, 2020–21
