= Jonas Elmer =

Swiss footballer (born 1988)

Personal information
- Full name: Jonas Elmer
- Date of birth: 28 February 1988 (age 38)
- Place of birth: Zürich, Switzerland
- Height: 1.76 m (5 ft 9 in)
- Position: Left back

Team information
- Current team: FC Stäfa (player-assistant)

Youth career
- 1997–2001: FC Stäfa
- 2001–2005: Grasshopper
- 2005–2007: Chelsea

Senior career*
Years	Team	Apps	(Gls)
2007–2010	FC Aarau	52	(0)
2010–2013	FC Sion	23	(0)
2012	→ AC Bellinzona (loan)	12	(0)
2012–2013	FC Winterthur	18	(1)
2013	Toronto FC	1	(0)
2013–2014	FC Winterthur	18	(0)
2014–2015	Biel-Bienne	34	(1)
2015–2019	Rapperswil-Jona	133	(15)
2020–	FC Stäfa		
Total		291	(17)

International career
2006–2010	Switzerland U21	6	(0)

Managerial career
- 2020–: FC Stäfa (player-assistant)
- * Club domestic league appearances and goals as of 18:40, 8 May 2020 (UTC)

Jonas Elmer (born 28 February 1988) is a Swiss footballer who currently works for FC Stäfa as a player-assistant coach.

== Football career ==
=== Early career ===
Elmer was signed by English Premier League side Chelsea in the summer of 2005 from Grasshoppers. He featured regularly for the Chelsea reserve and youth teams in both the 2005–06 and 2006–07 seasons.

Elmer made his first start for Chelsea's first team when coming on from the substitutes bench in a pre-season fixture against A.C. Milan, where he played the remainder of the match. His second appearance was against Wycombe Wanderers on 13 July 2005. Chelsea went on to win the game 5–1. He also came on as a substitute to make his third appearance for the club four days later as Chelsea F.C. beat Portuguese club Benfica 1–0 in another pre-season fixture.

Elmer looked as though he could have a promising future at Chelsea and signed a new two-year contract in early April 2006.

=== Aarau ===
On 25 June 2007, Elmer traveled back to Switzerland and signed a two-year contract with FC Aarau

=== Sion ===
On 18 May 2010, it was made official that Elmer had signed a three-year contract with FC Sion.

=== Winterthur ===
In 2012, he joined FC Winterthur in the Swiss Challenge League and made 21 appearances.

=== Toronto FC ===
He signed with Toronto FC on 1 August 2013. He mutually parted ways with Toronto FC the following off-season.

=== Rapperswil-Jona ===
In July 2015, Elmer returned to Switzerland with FC Rapperswil-Jona.

=== Return to FC Stäfa ===
Having completed a distance learning degree in business administration in 2016, and since then worked as a property manager beside his football career, Elmer decided to terminate his contract with FC Rapperswil-Jona at the end of 2019 and put an end to his professional career to focus on his civil career. He continued playing for his former youth club, FC Stäfa, in the Swiss 3rd division, as a player-assistant coach.

== Honours ==
Sion

- Swiss Cup: 2010–11
