= Freddy Mveng =

Cameroonian footballer

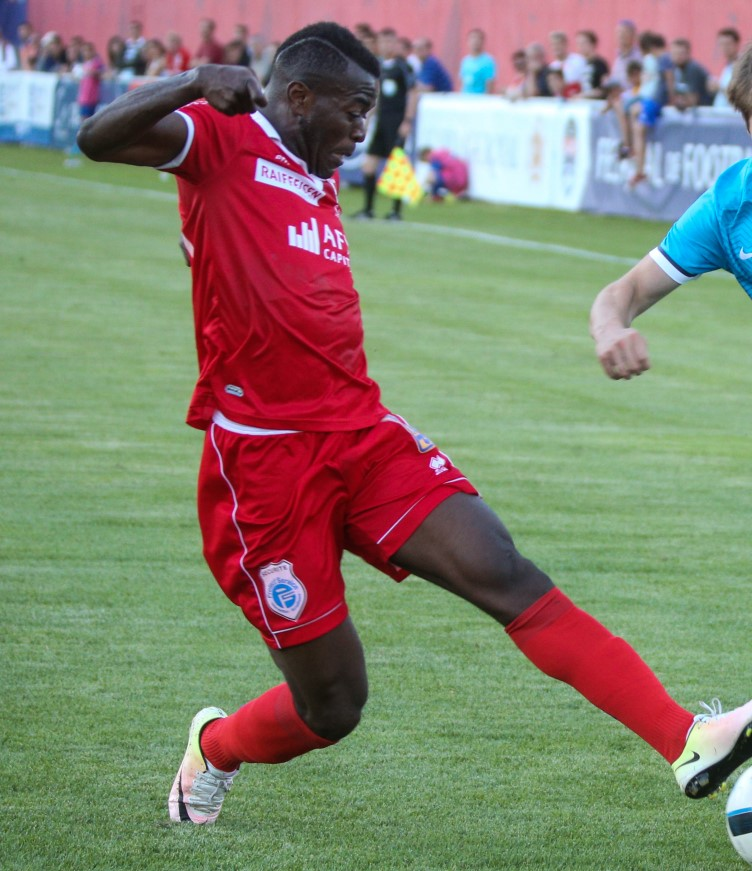

Personal information
- Full name: Frederic Mveng Mbezele
- Date of birth: 29 May 1992 (age 34)
- Place of birth: Maroua, Cameroon
- Height: 1.76 m (5 ft 9 1/2 in)
- Position: Defensive midfielder

Youth career
- 2004–2006: Sahel
- 2006–2008: Lausanne-Sport

Senior career*
Years	Team	Apps	(Gls)
2008–2009	Lausanne-Sport	18	(0)
2009–2011	Neuchâtel Xamax	31	(1)
2010–2011	Neuchâtel Xamax II	4	(3)
2011–2013	Young Boys	1	(0)
2011–2012	Young Boys II	9	(0)
2012–2013	→ Wohlen (loan)	24	(1)
2013–2014	Sion	5	(0)
2014	Lausanne-Sport II	10	(0)
2014–2015	Lausanne-Sport	9	(0)
2015–2016	Neuchâtel Xamax	33	(3)
2016–2019	Sion	34	(2)
2019–2021	Neuchâtel Xamax	52	(2)
2022	Sion II	6	(0)
2022–2026	Biel-Bienne	81	(0)
Total		317	(12)
- * Club domestic league appearances and goals

Frederic "Freddy" Mveng Mbezele (born 29 May 1992) is a retired Cameroonian footballer who played as a right back and defensive midfielder.

== Career ==
Mveng began his career with Sahel FC and joined 2004 to Switzerland who signed for Lausanne Sport. After three years with Lausanne Sport, he left the team and signed on 12 August 2009 a contract for Neuchâtel Xamax. He made his debut in the Swiss Super League on 10 April 2010 against Grasshopper Club Zürich. In May 2013 he signed a 3-year contract with FC Sion, but returned to Lausanne on 5 February 2014.

On 13 July 2022, Mveng joined Biel-Bienne on a one-season deal.
