= Daniel Soares =

Portuguese footballer

Personal information
- Full name: Daniel Soares Brites
- Date of birth: 9 November 1992 (age 33)
- Place of birth: Portugal
- Height: 1.83 m (6 ft 0 in)
- Position: Forward

Team information
- Current team: Stade Nyonnais

Youth career
- ?–2009: FC City
- 2009–2010: FC Aïre-Le-Lignon
- 2010–2011: Servette

Senior career*
Years	Team	Apps	(Gls)
2011–	Servette	4	(1)
2012	→ Étoile Carouge (loan)		
2013	→ Stade Nyonnais (loan)		
- * Club domestic league appearances and goals as of 14:14, 2 August 2012 (UTC)

Daniel Soares Brites (born 9 November 1992) is a Portuguese footballer who plays for Swiss club Stade Nyonnais on loan from Servette FC, as a forward.
