= Mathieu Debonnaire =

Swiss footballer (born 1987)

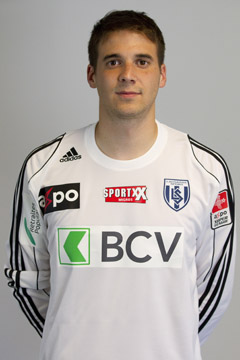

Personal information
- Date of birth: 26 April 1987 (age 39)
- Place of birth: Switzerland
- Height: 1.89 m (6 ft 2 in)
- Position: Goalkeeper

Youth career
- Lausanne-Sport

Senior career*
Years	Team	Apps	(Gls)
2006–2010	Lausanne-Sport	14	(0)
2006–2007	→ Fribourg (loan)	3	(0)
2010–2011	Nyon	21	(0)
2011–2013	Lausanne-Sport	9	(0)
2013–2015	Sion	0	(0)
2015–2016	Berliner AK 07	4	(0)
- * Club domestic league appearances and goals as of 19 June 2013

Mathieu Debonnaire (born 26 April 1987) is a former Swiss professional footballer. He also holds French citizenship.
