= Guilherme Afonso =

Angolan-Swiss footballer (born 1985)

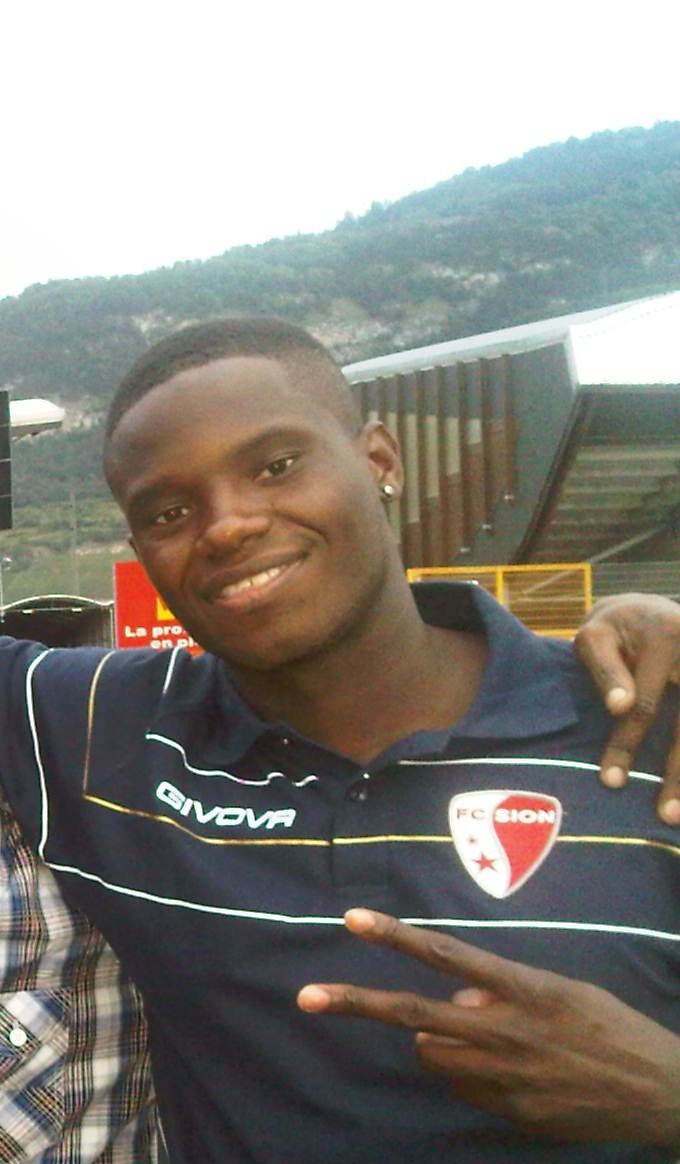

Personal information
- Date of birth: 15 November 1985 (age 40)
- Place of birth: Luanda, Angola
- Height: 1.87 m (6 ft 2 in)
- Position: Striker

Senior career*
Years	Team	Apps	(Gls)
2001–2003	Étoile Carouge	17	(5)
2003–2004	Valence	3	(0)
2004–2007	Twente	32	(2)
2007–2008	Veendam	44	(6)
2009–2012	Sion	28	(3)
2009–2010	→ Grasshopper (loan)	7	(0)
2010–2011	→ Lugano (loan)	29	(10)
2012–2013	Vaduz	27	(3)
2013–2014	1º de Agosto	22	(7)
2015	Kabuscorp	3	(0)
2016–2017	FC Azzurri LS 90	11	(4)
2019–2020	Mendrisio-Stabio	24	(10)
Total		247	(50)

International career^{‡}
2006	Switzerland U21	1	(0)
2013	Angola	8	(2)
- * Club domestic league appearances and goals as of 1 August 2013 ‡ National team caps and goals as of 7 September 2013

Guilherme Afonso (born 15 November 1985) is a retired footballer who played as a striker. He has dual Angolan-Swiss nationality.

== Club career ==
Afonso has played club-football in Switzerland for Étoile Carouge, Sion, Grasshopper, Lugano and FC Vaduz; in France for Valence; and in the Netherlands for Twente and Veendam. In 2009 he scored the winning goal as Sion defeated BSC Young Boys 3–2 in the Swiss Cup Final.

In the summer 2012 he signed a two-year contract with FC Vaduz. In the summer of 2013 he signed a year and half contract with Primeiro de Agosto.

Afonso signed with Mendrisio-Stabio in December 2018.

== International career ==
Afonso, who has previously played for Switzerland at under-21 level, was selected by Angola for the 2013 Africa Cup of Nations.

=== International goals ===
Scores and results list Angola's goal tally first.

No	Date	Venue	Opponent	Score	Result	Competition
1.	7 June 2013	Estádio 11 de Novembro, Luanda, Angola	Senegal	1–0	1–1	2014 FIFA World Cup qualification
2.	7 September 2013	Estádio Nacional da Tundavala, Lubango, Angola	Liberia	3–0	4–1	2014 FIFA World Cup qualification

== Honours ==
Sion

- Swiss Cup: 2008–09
