= Stefan Glarner =

Swiss footballer (born 1987)

Personal information
- Date of birth: 21 November 1987 (age 38)
- Place of birth: Meiringen, Switzerland
- Height: 1.76 m (5 ft 9 in)
- Positions: Midfielder; defender

Team information
- Current team: FC Köniz
- Number: 31

Youth career
- 1998–2006: SV Meiringen

Senior career*
Years	Team	Apps	(Gls)
2006–2011	FC Thun	106	(8)
2011–2012	FC Sion	0	(0)
2012–2014	FC Zürich	50	(0)
2014–2020	FC Thun	171	(1)
2021–	FC Köniz	19	(0)

International career
2007	Switzerland U-21	2	(0)
- * Club domestic league appearances and goals as of 16 October 2021

Stefan Glarner (born 21 November 1987) is a Swiss footballer who plays for FC Köniz in the Swiss 1. Liga.

== Career statistics ==
As of match played on 18 February 2018

Appearances and goals by club, season and competition
Club	Season	League			Cup		League Cup		Other		Total	
Club	Season	Division	Apps	Goals	Apps	Goals	Apps	Goals	Apps	Goals	Apps	Goals
Thun	2008–09	Swiss Challenge League	?	3	0	0	—				?	3
Thun	2009–10	Swiss Challenge League	25	1	2	0	—				27	1
Thun	2010–11	Swiss Super League	29	3	1	0	—				30	3
Thun	Total		54	7	3	0	0	0	0	0	57	7
Sion	2011–12	Swiss Super League	0	0	0	0	—				0	0
Zürich	2011–12	Swiss Super League	14	0	0	0	—				14	0
Zürich	2012–13	Swiss Super League	26	0	1	0	—				27	0
Zürich	2013–14	Swiss Super League	10	0	2	0	—				12	0
Zürich	Total		50	0	3	0	0	0	0	0	53	0
Thun	2014–15	Swiss Super League	34	0	2	0	—				36	0
Thun	2015–16	Swiss Super League	11	0	0	0	—		2	0	13	0
Thun	2016–17	Swiss Super League	34	0	0	0	—				34	0
Thun	2017–18	Swiss Super League	18	1	3	0	—				21	1
Thun	Total		97	1	5	0	0	0	0	0	102	1
Career totals			201	8	11	0	0	0	2	0	214	8
