= Kevin Fickentscher =

Swiss footballer (born 1988)

Personal information
- Date of birth: 6 July 1988 (age 38)
- Place of birth: Nyon, Switzerland
- Height: 1.81 m (5 ft 11 in)
- Position: Goalkeeper

Team information
- Current team: Sion II
- Number: 1

Youth career
- 1998–2000: FC Rolle
- 2000–2004: Lausanne-Sport
- 2004–2007: Werder Bremen

Senior career*
Years	Team	Apps	(Gls)
2007–2008	Werder Bremen II	2	(0)
2008–2009	La Chaux-de-Fonds	27	(0)
2009–	Sion II	47	(0)
2009–2023	Sion	144	(0)
2013–2015	→ Lausanne-Sport (loan)	26	(0)

International career
2007–2008	Switzerland U20	3	(0)
2008–2011	Switzerland U21	5	(0)
- * Club domestic league appearances and goals as of 16 September 2023

Kevin Fickentscher (born 6 July 1988) is a Swiss professional footballer who plays for Sion II as a goalkeeper.

== Career ==
Fickentscher was born in Nyon, and initially began his footballing career with local side FC Rolle before a move to the academy of FC Lausanne-Sport in 2000. After a stay of four years, he was picked by German club SV Werder Bremen, where he went on to feature for the under-19 team but did not really break into the reserves, making two appearances for them.

This prompted a move back to Switzerland for him as he joined then-Swiss Challenge League team FC La Chaux-de-Fonds for the 2008–09 season.

The following year Fickentscher moved up to Swiss Super League with FC Sion. After joining the club, he played sparsely for the first team, featuring far more for the reserves. In the summer of 2013 he decided to return to FC Lausanne-Sport in order to get more playing time, signing on a two-year loan, allowing him to return to Sion in 2015 when his main competitor in goal, Andris Vaņins, would be out of contract at the club.
