= Geoffrey Tréand =

French footballer (born 1986)

Personal information
- Full name: Geoffrey Tréand
- Date of birth: 16 January 1986 (age 40)
- Place of birth: Annemasse, France
- Height: 1.78 m (5 ft 10 in)
- Position: Forward

Team information
- Current team: Servette U19 Manager

Youth career
- 2003–2005: Étoile Carouge

Senior career*
Years	Team	Apps	(Gls)
2005–2010	Servette	121	(44)
2010–2012	Neuchâtel Xamax	44	(4)
2012–2012	FC Sion	7	(0)
2012–2014	Servette	57	(17)
2014–2016	St. Gallen	51	(5)
2016–2017	Aarau	30	(10)
2017–2019	Neuchâtel Xamax	57	(13)
2019–2020	Étoile Carouge	0	(0)
- * Club domestic league appearances and goals as of 18:12, 21 July 2019 (UTC)

Geoffrey Tréand (born 16 January 1986) is a retired French professional footballer who last played as a forward for Étoile Carouge FC.

== Career ==
Tréand started his professional career by playing for Servette between 2005 and 2010, scoring 44 goals in 121 appearances, before transferring to Neuchâtel Xamax. After Xamax's bankruptcy in December 2011, Tréand signed for FC Sion. He was not able to establish himself in Sion's team, making only 6 appearances (5 as a substitute). On 18 June 2012, it was announced that Tréand had rejoined Servette on a three-year contract.

Tréand joined St. Gallen in July 2014 for a fee of £12,000. He left St Gallen on the expiration of his contract in summer 2016.

Ahead of the 2019/20 season, Tréand joined Étoile Carouge FC on a 1-year contract.
