= Sébastien Wüthrich =

Swiss footballer (born 1990)

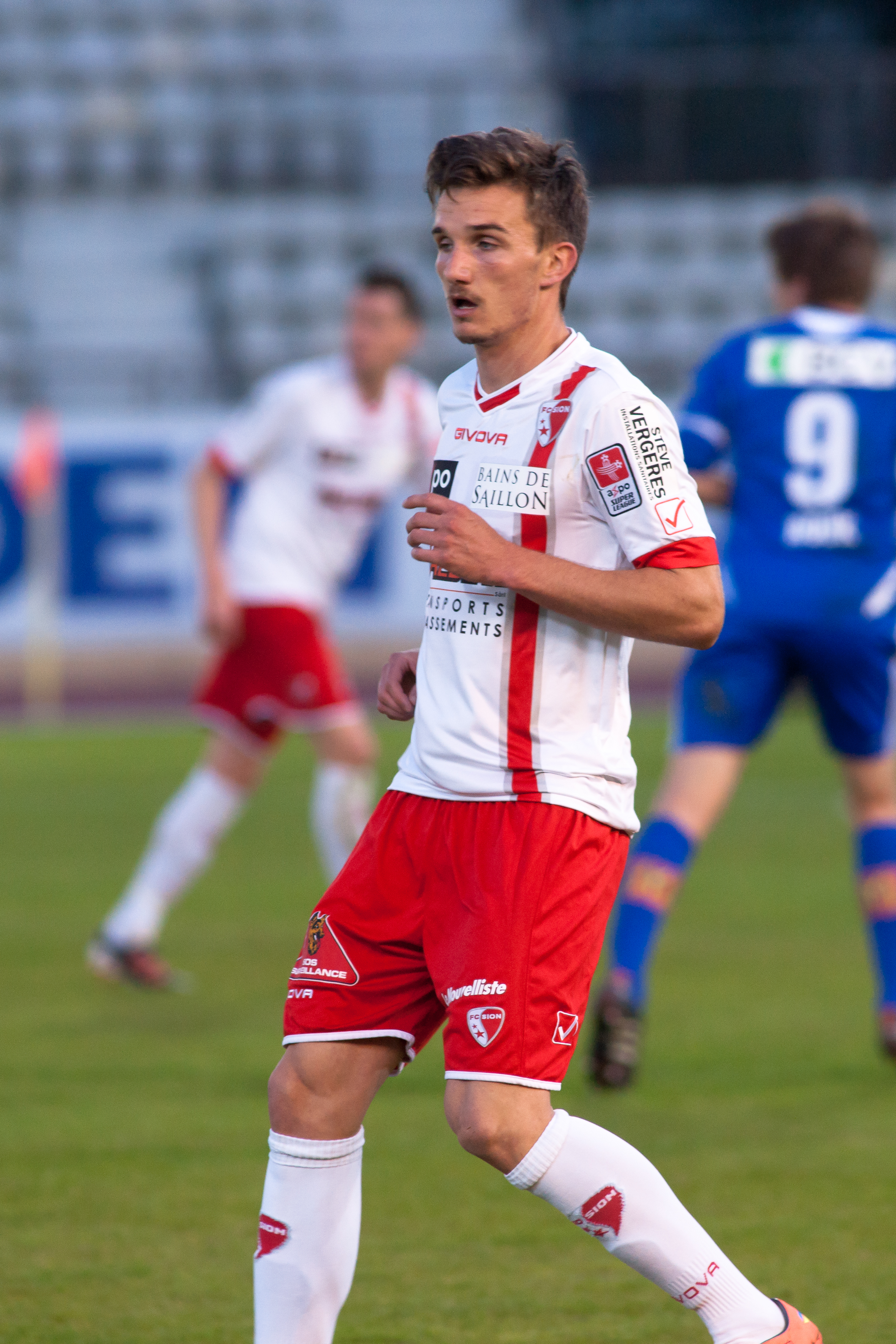
- Wüthrich in 2012

Personal information
- Full name: Sébastien Wüthrich
- Date of birth: 29 May 1990 (age 36)
- Place of birth: Neuchâtel, Switzerland
- Height: 1.80 m (5 ft 11 in)
- Position: Midfielder

Youth career
- 2002–2007: Neuchâtel Xamax

Senior career*
| Years | Team | Apps | (Gls) |
| 2007–2012 | Neuchâtel Xamax | 103 | (10) |
| 2012–2015 | FC Sion | 27 | (2) |
| 2013–2014 | → St. Gallen (loan) | 43 | (6) |
| 2015–2016 | Montpellier B | 19 | (2) |
| 2015–2016 | Montpellier | 2 | (0) |
| 2016–2017 | FC Aarau | 27 | (7) |
| 2017–2020 | Servette | 72 | (21) |
| 2020–2021 | Astra Giurgiu | 24 | (3) |
| 2021 | Ratchaburi Mitr Phol | 13 | (0) |

International career
| | Switzerland U18 | 3 | (0) |
| | Switzerland U19 | 11 | (3) |
| 2009–2012 | Switzerland U21 | 9 | (0) |
- * Club domestic league appearances and goals as of 24 October 2021

Sébastien Wüthrich (born 29 May 1990) is a Swiss professional footballer who last played as a midfielder for Ratchaburi Mitr Phol in the Thai League 1. He is a full international for Switzerland under-21.
