= Stephan Klossner =

Swiss football referee (born 1981)

- Full name: Stephan Klossner
- Born: 30 May 1981 (age 45); Bern, Switzerland

Domestic
| Years | League | Role |

International
| Years | League | Role |
| 2012– | FIFA listed | Referee |

Stephan Klossner (born 30 May 1981 in Bern, Switzerland) is a Swiss professional football referee. He has been a full international for FIFA since 2012.
