= Mario Mutsch =

Luxembourgish footballer (born 1984)

Personal information
- Date of birth: 3 September 1984 (age 42)
- Place of birth: St. Vith, Belgium
- Height: 1.73 m (5 ft 8 in)
- Position: Defensive midfielder

Youth career
- RFC St. Vith
- Olymp. Recht

Senior career*
Years	Team	Apps	(Gls)
2002–2005	Spa FC	78	(12)
2005–2006	Union La Calamine	27	(0)
2006–2007	Alemannia Aachen II	34	(4)
2007–2009	Aarau	58	(3)
2009–2011	Metz	57	(1)
2011–2012	Sion	15	(2)
2012–2017	St Gallen	119	(1)
2017–2019	Progrès Niederkorn	27	(1)
Total		415	(24)

International career
2005–2019	Luxembourg	102	(4)

Managerial career
- 2019: Progrès Niederkorn (caretaker manager)
- 2019–: Luxembourg (assistant manager)
- 2019–2021: Luxembourg U15
- 2021–2022: Luxembourg U17
- 2022–: Luxembourg U19
- * Club domestic league appearances and goals

Mario Mutsch (born 3 September 1984) is a former professional footballer who played as a defensive midfielder. Born in Belgium, he played for the Luxembourg national team.

== Club career ==
Born in St. Vith, Mutsch started his career at Belgian lower leagues sides Spa and Kelmis (La Calamine) before heading to Germany to play for the Alemannia Aachen reserve team. In summer 2007 he joined Swiss Super League FC Aarau on the suggestion of his former national team coach Jeff Saibene, who was assistant manager at FC Aarau.

On 16 July 2009, it was announced that Mutsch had signed for French Ligue 2 side FC Metz on a free transfer. In 2011, he joined Swiss side FC Sion for only one season and in 2012 he moved on to FC St. Gallen.

== International career ==
Mutsch made his debut for Luxembourg in an October 2005 World Cup qualification match against Russia and by June 2019 he had earned 102 caps, scoring four goals. He has played in 11 FIFA World Cup qualification matches.

Mutsch retired from both club and international football after his Luxembourg record 102nd international appearance, against Madagascar on 2 June 2019.

== Personal life ==
Mutsch was born and raised in the German speaking Community of Belgium. His father is a Luxembourger who grew up in Eastern Belgium, his mother is a Belgian.

== Career statistics ==
Scores and results list Luxembourg's goal tally first, score column indicates score after each Mutsch goal.

List of international goals scored by Mario Mutsch
No.	Date	Venue	Opponent	Score	Result	Competition	Ref.
1	19 November 2008	Stade Josy Barthel, Luxembourg, Luxembourg	Belgium	1–1	1–1	Friendly	
2	5 February 2013	Stade Georges Pompidou, Valence, France	Armenia	1–0	1–1	Friendly	
3	31 March 2015	Stade Josy Barthel, Luxembourg, Luxembourg	Turkey	1–1	1–2	Friendly	
4	12 October 2015	Stade Josy Barthel, Luxembourg, Luxembourg	Slovakia	1–3	2–4	UEFA Euro 2016 qualification	

== See also ==
- List of men's footballers with 100 or more international caps
