= Cristian Ianu =

Romanian footballer

Personal information
- Full name: Cristian Florin Ianu
- Date of birth: 16 October 1983 (age 43)
- Place of birth: Timișoara, Romania
- Height: 1.77 m (5 ft 10 in)
- Position: Striker

Senior career*
Years	Team	Apps	(Gls)
1999–2003	UTA Arad	49	(15)
2003–2007	Bellinzona	121	(65)
2007–2009	Aarau	69	(17)
2009–2011	Luzern	62	(27)
2012–2014	Sion	9	(2)
2012–2013	→ Wohlen (loan)	25	(7)
2013–2014	→ Sion II	10	(4)
2014	Lausanne-Sport	17	(13)
2015–2016	Luzern	7	(0)
2015	→ Schaffhausen (loan)	18	(2)
2016	→ Wohlen (loan)	13	(2)
2017–2019	Muri		
Total		400	(154)

International career
2001	Romania U19	8	(1)
- * Club domestic league appearances and goals

Cristian Florin Ianu (born 16 October 1983) is a Romanian former professional footballer who played as a striker.

== Club career ==
Ianu was born in Timișoara, Romania to parents originating from Motru. He grew up supporting Universitatea Craiova, where he particularly admired Gheorghe Craioveanu and Ionuț Luțu. He began playing senior-level football at UTA Arad during the 1999–2000 Divizia B season. Ianu scored nine goals in the 2001–02 season to help the team gain promotion to the first league. Subsequently, he made his Divizia A debut on 18 August 2002, when coach Ionuț Popa sent him in the 68th minute to replace Adrian Drida in a 2–1 loss to Național București. He scored his first goal in the competition on 7 May 2003 in a 3–1 home win over FCM Bacău. On 28 May, Ianu netted a hat-trick in a 6–0 victory against Gloria Bistrița. However, he could not avoid UTA's relegation back to the second league at the end of the 2002–03 season. In his single Divizia A season, Ianu scored four goals in 22 matches.

In 2003, Ianu moved to Swiss second-tier club Bellinzona. During his time there, he was teammates with fellow Romanians Adrian Piț and Cristian Todea. In his four-season stint with Bellinzona, he scored between 12 and 19 goals per season, but it was not enough to help the team gain promotion to the first league. In 2007, Ianu joined the first league club Aarau, where he became a teammate of compatriot Daniel Oprița. He made his Swiss Super League debut on 22 July, as coach Ryszard Komornicki sent him in the 60th minute to replace Rogério in a 1–1 draw against Young Boys. His first goals in the competition came on 12 August, when he netted twice in a 5–2 away win over FC Thun. He scored 10 goals until the end of the 2007–08 season, including another brace in a 5–0 victory against FC Thun. Ianu started the following season strongly by scoring six goals in the first seven rounds, which helped his side earn wins over Sion, Vaduz, and Luzern, and a draw against Young Boys. However, he did not score any goals in the rest of the season.

In June 2009, Ianu went to play for Luzern. He scored a career-best 21 goals in the 2009–10 season, which made him the league's second top-scorer alongside Marco Streller and Émile Mpenza, behind only Seydou Doumbia, who netted 30. For this performance, Ianu was voted Luzern's best player by the club's fans. Subsequently, he played in both legs of the 4–1 aggregate loss to Utrecht in the 2010–11 Europa League third qualifying round. In August 2010, during a match against Basel, Ianu was injured by goalkeeper Franco Costanzo, suffering a fracture of the left tibia. Following this injury, it took him nine months to score once again in a 4–0 victory over St. Gallen. In January 2012, Ianu moved to Sion, becoming a teammate of compatriot George Ogăraru. In July 2012, he was sent on loan by Sion to second-tier club Wohlen.

In July 2014, Ianu signed with Lausanne-Sport in the second league. He scored eight goals in the first seven rounds of the 2014–15 season. Until the end of the first half of the season, he netted 13 times in 17 matches, including a hat-trick in a 3–1 victory against Wohlen. These performances earned him the award for the best 2014 Challenge League player at the "Swiss Football League Award Night". In January 2015, Ianu returned to Luzern. There, he made his last Swiss Super League appearance on 25 May 2015 in a 1–0 loss to Zürich, totaling 147 matches with 46 goals in the competition. In July 2015, Luzern loaned him to second league club Schaffhausen. Afterwards, in January 2016, Ianu was sent on loan to Wohlen, also in the second league, where he ended his professional career. From 2017 to 2019, Ianu played at an amateur level in the fifth tier for Muri.

== International career ==
In 2001, Ianu made appearances for Romania's under-19 team, including six matches during the 2002 European Under-19 Championship qualifiers, where he scored in a 4–0 win over FR Yugoslavia.

== Style of play ==
In a 2008 interview for the Libertatea newspaper, Ianu described his style of play as follows: "I don't mean to brag, but let’s just say I'm the Mutu of Switzerland—keeping things in perspective, of course. Adi is my idol, and I think my style is similar to his, because we both score goals, but we also provide plenty of assists."

== Personal life ==
Ianu is the brother-in-law of Swiss international Kubilay Türkyilmaz, as he married Türkyilmaz's sister, Leyla.

== Honours ==
UTA Arad

- Divizia B: 2001–02

Individual

- Swiss Challenge League Footballer of the Year: 2014
