= Pa Modou Jagne =

Gambian footballer

Personal information
- Full name: Pa Modou Jagne
- Date of birth: 26 December 1989 (age 36)
- Place of birth: Banjul, The Gambia
- Height: 1.86 m (6 ft 1 in)
- Position: Defender

Team information
- Current team: FC Dietikon
- Number: 13

Senior career*
Years	Team	Apps	(Gls)
2007	Gambia Ports Authority		
2008	FC Wil	26	(6)
2009–2013	St. Gallen	111	(6)
2013–2017	Sion	102	(5)
2017–2020	FC Zürich	70	(3)
2021–	FC Dietikon	11	(3)

International career^{‡}
2008–2022	Gambia	43	(2)
- * Club domestic league appearances and goals as of 16 October 2021 ‡ National team caps and goals as of 18 January 2022

Pa Modou Jagne (born 26 December 1989) is a Gambian professional footballer who plays as a defender for Swiss fifth-tier 2. Liga Interregional club FC Dietikon.

== Club career ==
=== Sion ===
In July 2013, Jagne moved to FC Sion on a free transfer. He made his league debut for the club on 13 July 2013 in a 2–0 away defeat to Young Boys. He played all ninety minutes of the match. He scored his first league goal for the club on 9 March 2014 in a 3–2 home victory over FC Luzern. He was subbed on for Birama Ndoye at half-time and scored in the 72nd minute. His goal made the score 3–2 to Sion.

=== FC Zürich ===
In June 2017 he signed a two-year contract with Zürich. He made his league debut for the club on 23 July 2017 in a 2–0 away victory over Grasshopper Zürich. He played all ninety minutes of the match. He scored his first league goal for the club on 1 October 2017 in a 3–0 home victory over FC Lugano. He was subbed on for Michael Frey in the 83rd minute and scored just six minutes later. His goal, assisted by Raphael Dwamena, made the score 3–0 to Zürich.

Jagne's contract expired in the summer 2019. However, he returned to the club and signed a new contract on 4 September 2019 until the summer 2020. In July 2020 his contract was not renewed.

=== International goals ===
Scores and results list the Gambia's goal tally first.

No.	Date	Venue	Opponent	Score	Result	Competition
1.	3 June 2007	Stade du 28 Septembre, Conakry, Guinea	Guinea	2–2	2–2	2008 Africa Cup of Nations qualification
2.	18 November 2019	Independence Stadium, Bakau, Gambia	DR Congo	1–1	2–2	2021 Africa Cup of Nations qualification

== International career ==
He played in the 2021 Africa cup of Nations, his national team's first continental tournament, where they made a sensational quarter-final.

== Honours ==
=== Club ===
St. Gallen

- Swiss Challenge League: 2011–12

Sion

- Swiss Cup: 2014–15
- Swiss Cup runner-up: 2016–17

FC Zürich

- Swiss Cup: 2017–18

=== Individual ===
- Swiss Super League Team of the Year: 2015–16
