= Christ Mbondi =

Cameroonian footballer

Personal information
- Full name: Christ Mbondi
- Date of birth: February 2, 1992 (age 34)
- Place of birth: Cameroon
- Height: 1.80 m (5 ft 11 in)
- Position: Forward

Team information
- Current team: FC San Pédro

Youth career
- 2010: FC Bamenda Academy
- 2010: FC Sion

Senior career*
Years	Team	Apps	(Gls)
2010–2013	FC Sion II	49	(10)
2010–2013	FC Sion	3	(0)
2013	→ Bangkok Glass (loan)	12	(6)
2013–2015	Khonkaen		
2015–2016	JS Saoura	2	(1)
2016	Deportivo Capiatá	9	(3)
2017	Olimpia Itá		
2018–2019	Rayon Sports		
2019–	FC San Pédro		

International career
2011	Cameroon U20	4	(1)
- * Club domestic league appearances and goals as of 15:22, 4 December 2019 (UTC)

Christ Mbondi (born 2 February 1992) is a Cameroonian footballer who plays for FC San Pédro.

== Career ==
He played in 2011 FIFA U-20 World Cup.
