= Michael Dingsdag =

Dutch retired footballer

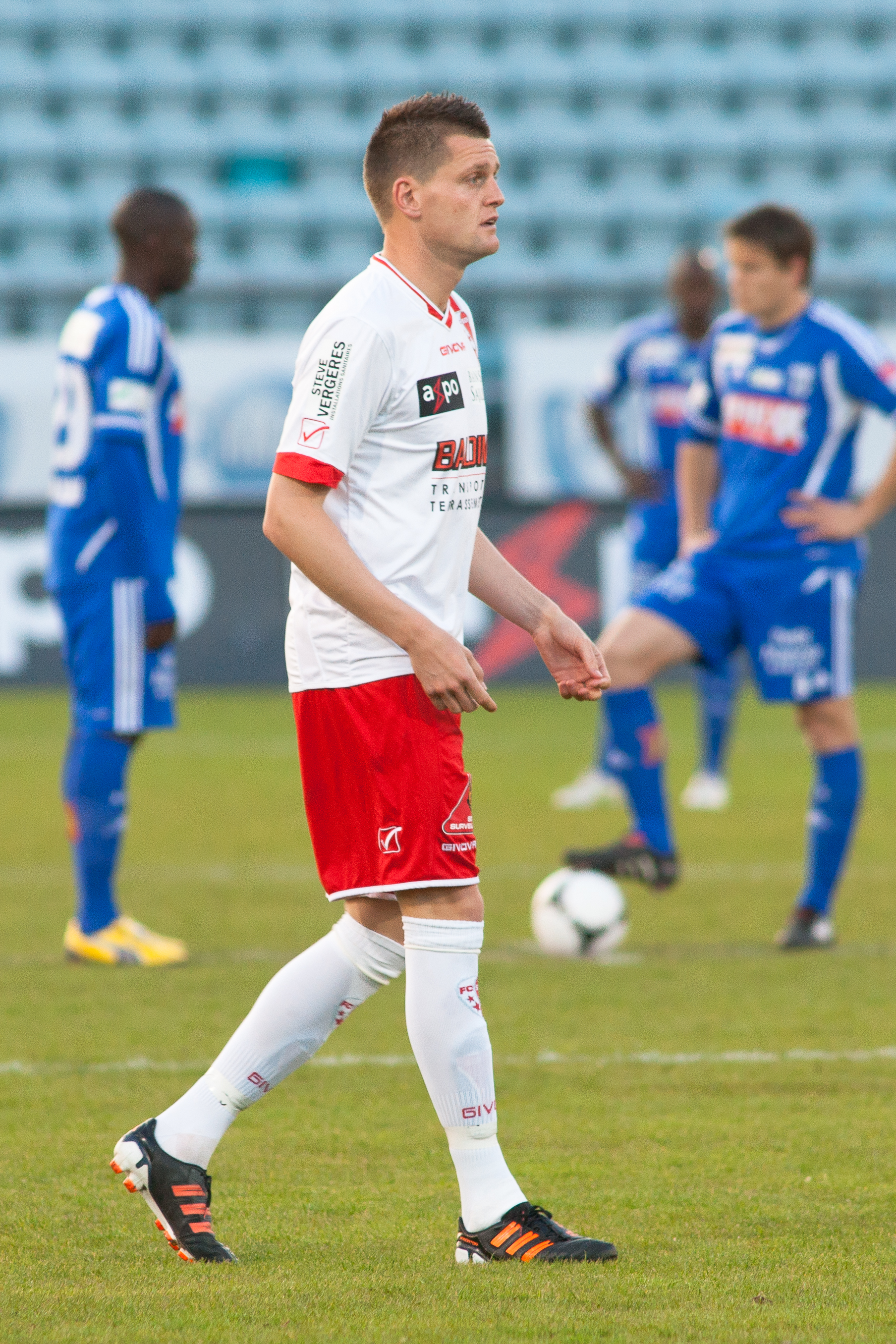
- Dingsdag with Sion in 2012

Personal information
- Full name: Michael Christiaan Dingsdag
- Date of birth: 18 October 1982 (age 44)
- Place of birth: Amsterdam, Netherlands
- Height: 1.85 m (6 ft 1 in)
- Positions: Centre back; defensive midfielder

Youth career
- 1988–1999: DWS
- 1999–2001: Vitesse

Senior career*
Years	Team	Apps	(Gls)
2001–2006	Vitesse	90	(3)
2006–2010	Heerenveen	117	(2)
2010–2013	Sion	95	(2)
2013–2015	Grasshoppers	48	(1)
2015–2016	NAC	22	(0)
2016–2018	Veensche Boys	39	(2)
Total		411	(10)

International career
2002-2003	Netherlands U21	5	(0)
2004	Netherlands U23	2	(0)
- * Club domestic league appearances and goals

Michael Christiaan Dingsdag (born 18 October 1982) is a Dutch former professional footballer who played as a central defender. He is currently working as a youth coach at NAC Breda.

== Club career ==
Born in Amsterdam, Dingsdag began his youth career at the age of six in 1988 in his hometown with DWS, before being scouted in 1999 by Vitesse. After two years in the youth side of Vitesse/AGOVV, he was promoted to the first team of Vitesse in July 2001 competing in the top tier Eredivisie. In five years at the club, he made 90 appearances and scored three goals, before signing with league rivals Heerenveen in June 2006.

Dingsdag then enjoyed a five-year stint in Switzerland, with three seasons at Sion, and another two at Grasshoppers.

In summer 2015, Dingsdag returned to the Netherlands to sign a two-year deal with Eerste Divisie club NAC Breda. He finished his professional career after one year to become youth coach at NAC. He joined amateur side Veensche Boys at the same time to continue playing at amateur level.

== International career ==
Dingsdag played 5 games for the Netherlands national under-21 football team.

== Honours ==
Heerenveen

- KNVB Cup: 2008–09

Sion

- Swiss Cup: 2010–11
