= Adaílton (footballer, born 1983) =

Brazilian footballer

Personal information
- Full name: Adaílton José dos Santos Filho
- Date of birth: 16 April 1983 (age 43)
- Place of birth: Salvador, Brazil
- Height: 1.90 m (6 ft 3 in)
- Position: Central defender

Youth career
- 1995–2002: Vitória

Senior career*
Years	Team	Apps	(Gls)
2002–2004	Vitória	36	(4)
2004–2006	Rennes	42	(0)
2006	Central Español	3	(0)
2007–2010	Santos	50	(3)
2010–2012	FC Sion	66	(3)
2012	Henan Jianye	15	(0)
2013–2014	FC Sion	14	(1)
2013–2014	→ FC Chiasso (loan)	26	(2)
2014	Bahia	4	(0)
2015	Chicago Fire	19	(1)
2016	Miami FC	16	(0)

International career
2003	Brazil U20	7	(1)
- * Club domestic league appearances and goals

Adaílton José dos Santos Filho, also known as Adaílton (born 16 April 1983) is a Brazilian former footballer who played as a central defender.

== Career ==
=== Club ===
Adaílton began his career with Vitória, where he captured three State League titles. In 2004, he was signed by Ligue 1 side Rennes and went on to appear in 42 league matches for the French club. In 2007, he returned to Brazil signing with Santos and quickly established himself with the club helping them to the 2007 Campeonato Paulista title. In August 2008, Adaílton renewed his contract with Santos, until December 2009 and signed in February 2010 for FC Sion. He became a regular starter for the Swiss side and helped the club capture the 2010–11 Swiss Cup. He left Sion during the summer of 2012 for Henan Jianye. As the club was relegated from the Chinese Super League, Adaílton returned to Sion during the next transfer window in the winter of 2013.

After appearing regularly for Sion, Adaílton was sent on loan to Swiss league rival FC Chiasso. Adaílton featured regularly for Chiasso in his one season at the club making 26 league appearances and scoring two goals. At the conclusion of the Swiss league Adaílton returned to Brazil signing with Bahia. After only six months with the club in which he appeared in 4 matches, Adaílton left the club.

On 30 December 2014 it was announced that Chicago Fire had signed Adaílton.

=== International ===
Adaílton was a member the Brazil national under-20 football team that captured the 2003 FIFA World Youth Championship. During the tournament he scored his lone goal for Brazil in a 1–1 draw with the Czech Republic on 1 December 2003.

== Honours ==
Sion

- Swiss Cup: 2010–11
- Paulista State League: 2007
- Bahia State League: 2002, 2003, 2004
- Nordeste Cup: 2003
- World Cup (U 20): 2003
