= Aislan =

Brazilian footballer (born 1988)

Personal information
- Full name: Aislan Paulo Lotici Back
- Date of birth: January 11, 1988 (age 38)
- Place of birth: Realeza, Brazil
- Height: 1.93 m (6 ft 4 in)
- Position: Centre-back

Team information
- Current team: Akritas Chlorakas
- Number: 33

Youth career
- 2003: Rio Branco
- 2004–2007: São Paulo
- 2007: → Sheffield United (loan)

Senior career*
| Years | Team | Apps | (Gls) |
| 2008–2010 | São Paulo | 24 | (0) |
| 2010–2011 | Guarani | 42 | (4) |
| 2012–2013 | Sion | 18 | (0) |
| 2014 | Madureira | 33 | (0) |
| 2015–2016 | Vasco da Gama | 9 | (0) |
| 2017 | Macaé | 11 | (0) |
| 2017 | Náutico | 26 | (2) |
| 2018 | Madureira | 0 | (0) |
| 2018 | São Bento | 0 | (0) |
| 2019 | Tupi | 11 | (0) |
| 2019 | Serra | 5 | (0) |
| 2019–2020 | Othellos Athienou | 12 | (2) |
| 2020– | Akritas Chlorakas | 21 | (1) |
- * Club domestic league appearances and goals as of 19:21, 16 June 2019 (UTC)

Aislan Paulo Lotici Back (born 11 January 1988 in Realeza), or simply Aislan, is a Brazilian central defender who plays for Akritas Chlorakas.

== Career ==
Central defender race and disposition, was revealed in the youth of São Paulo, where he arrived in 2004.

Struck early in the Campeonato Brasileiro Série A 2010 he went to the Guarani of Campinas.

He signed in 2012 for the Swiss Club FC Sion.

== Career statistics ==
Updated 12 August 2010

Appearances and goals by club, season and competition
| Club | Season | Brazilian League | | Copa do Brasil | | Campeonato Paulista | | Libertadores | | Total | |
| Club | Season | App | Goals | App | Goals | App | Goals | App | Goals | App | Goals |
|---|---|---|---|---|---|---|---|---|---|---|---|
| São Paulo | 2008 | 4 | 0 | – | – | 0 | 0 | 2 | 0 | 6 | 0 |
| São Paulo | 2009 | 0 | 0 | – | – | 2 | 0 | 3 | 0 | 5 | 0 |
| São Paulo | 2010 | 0 | 0 | – | – | 0 | 0 | 0 | 0 | 0 | 0 |
| São Paulo | Club Total | 4 | 0 | 0 | 0 | 2 | 0 | 5 | 0 | 11 | 0 |
| Guarani | 2010 | ? | ? | 0 | 0 | 0 | 0 | – | – | ? | ? |
| Guarani | Club Total | ? | ? | 0 | 0 | 0 | 0 | 0 | 0 | 0 | 0 |
| Career total | | ? | ? | 0 | 0 | 2 | 0 | 5 | 0 | ? | ? |

== Career honours ==
São Paulo

- Brazilian League: 1

2008
