= Danilo Cirino =

Brazilian footballer (born 1986)

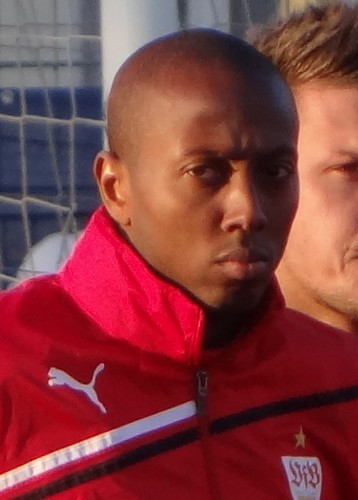
- Danilo in trial training with VfB Stuttgart.

Personal information
- Full name: Danilo Cirino de Oliveira
- Date of birth: 11 November 1986 (age 39)
- Place of birth: Sorocaba, Brazil
- Height: 1.87 m (6 ft 1 1/2 in)
- Position: Forward

Senior career*
Years	Team	Apps	(Gls)
- Guaçuano
2006–2007	Pogoń Szczecin	3	(1)
2007	Luverdense EC		
2007–2009	Příbram	31	(3)
2009	Spartak Trnava	4	(0)
2010–2012	Honvéd Budapest	40	(19)
2012–2013	Sion	13	(1)
2012–2013	→ Zorya Luhansk (loan)	20	(6)
2013–2015	Zorya Luhansk	28	(8)
2014	→ Kuban Krasnodar (loan)	14	(2)
2015	Aktobe	23	(6)
2016	Chiangrai United	12	(4)
2016–2017	Dibba Al-Fujairah	10	(0)
2017–2019	Honvéd Budapest	53	(15)
2019–2020	Muaither		
2020–2022	Nea Salamina	58	(24)
- * Club domestic league appearances and goals

Danilo Cirino de Oliveira (born 11 November 1986) is a Brazilian former professional footballer who played as a forward.

== Club career ==
=== Sion ===
In November 2011, Danilo Cirino started a trial training period at VfB Stuttgart, but he signed to Sion in January 2012.

=== Aktobe ===
On 31 March 2015, Danilo Cirino signed for Aktobe in the Kazakhstan Premier League.

=== Chiangrai United ===
On 10 March 2016, it was announced that Danilo Cirino would be joining Chiangrai United for the 2016 season.
