= Didier Crettenand =

Swiss football midfielder (born 1986)

Personal information
- Date of birth: 24 February 1986 (age 40)
- Place of birth: Bovernier, Switzerland
- Height: 1.80 m (5 ft 11 in)
- Position: Midfielder

Senior career*
Years	Team	Apps	(Gls)
2003–2013	FC Sion	128	(8)
2006–2011	→ FC Sion II	50	(13)
2006–2007	→ Lausanne-Sport (loan)	24	(1)
2013–2015	Servette	22	(0)
2015–2016	Orange County Blues	46	(16)

International career
2006	Switzerland U-21	3	(0)
- * Club domestic league appearances and goals as of 13 October 2016

Didier Crettenand (born 24 February 1986) is a Swiss football midfielder.

== Club career ==
Crettenand started his football career at Swiss Super League club Sion where he made 128 appearances, scoring 8 goals. During his time at Sion he played out on loan for two clubs, firstly FC Sion II (Sion's B-Team) and played in 50 matches while scoring 13 goals.

His secondary loan spell away from the Stade Tourbillon was to Swiss Challenge League side Lausanne-Sport, with whom he made 24 appearances and scored 1 goal. Crettenand joined Servette in 2013 where he stayed until February 2015 when he left by mutual consent to continue his career in North America with third-tier Orange County Blues.

== Honours ==
Sion

- Swiss Cup: 2005–06, 2008–09, 2010–11
