= Vilmos Vanczák =

Hungarian footballer (born 1983)

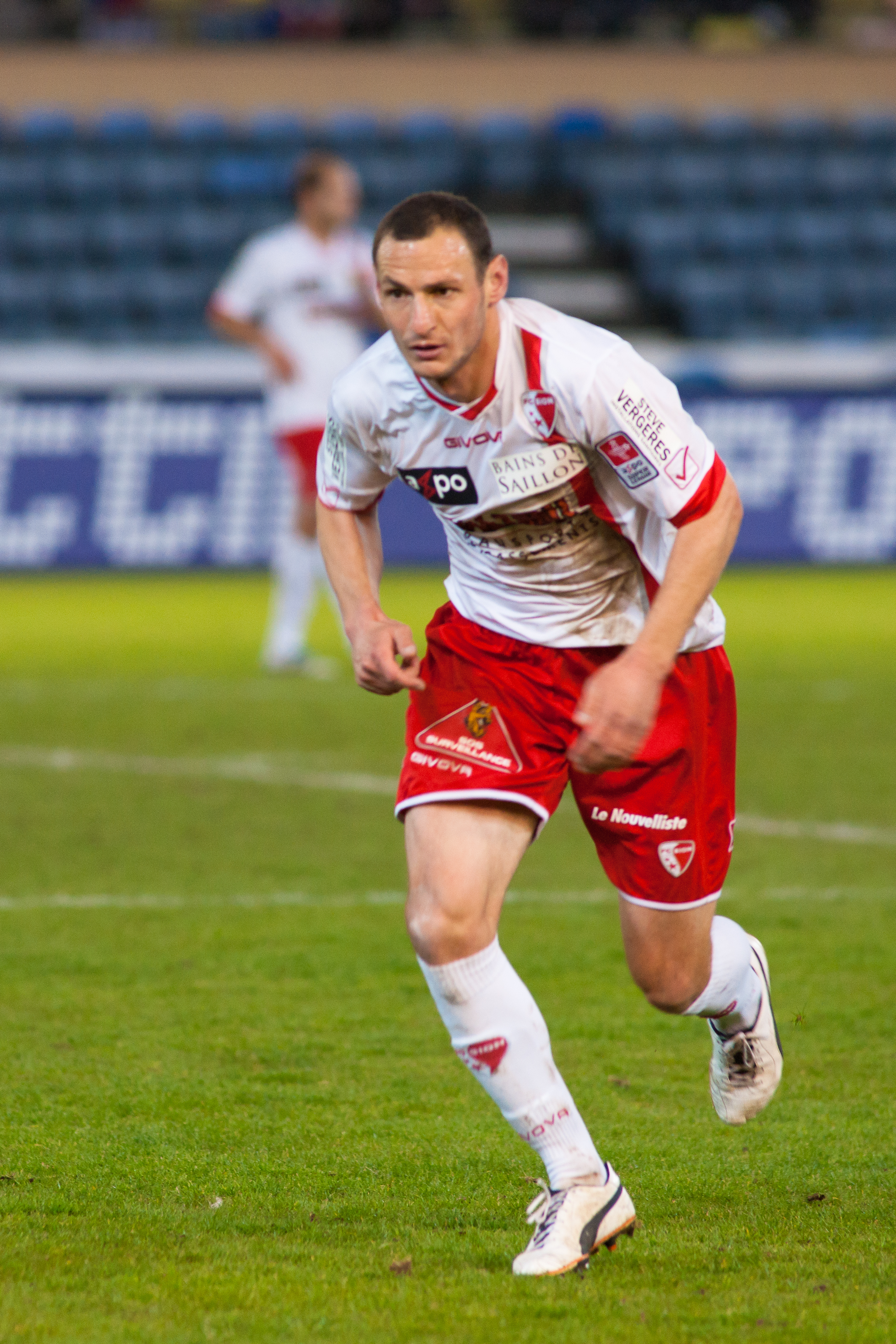
- Vanczák playing for FC Sion in 2012

Personal information
- Date of birth: 20 June 1983 (age 43)
- Place of birth: Miskolc, Hungary
- Height: 1.83 m (6 ft 0 in)
- Position: Full-back
- 2000–2001: Vasas SC
- 2001–2002: Újpest

Senior career*
Years	Team	Apps	(Gls)
2002–2007	Újpest	91	(4)
2002	→ Fóti SE (loan)	17	(2)
2006–2007	→ Sint-Truiden (loan)	30	(3)
2007–2016	FC Sion	254	(31)
2016–2018	Puskás Akadémia	40	(3)
Total		432	(43)

International career
1998–1999	Hungary U15	5	(0)
1999–2000	Hungary U16	9	(0)
2004–2015	Hungary	79	(4)

Managerial career
- 2019–: Hungary U21 (assistant manager)
- * Club domestic league appearances and goals

Vilmos Vanczák (Hungarian pronunciation: [ˈvilmoʃ ˈvɒnt͡saːk]; born 20 June 1983) is a Hungarian football coach and former professional footballer who played as a full-back. He is currently an assistant manager for Swiss club FC Sion

== Club career ==
=== Újpest ===
Born in Miskolc, Vanczák started to play football in his hometown's club, Diósgyőri VTK, and made his first-team debut at the age of 15. He spent the following season in the youth team of Vasas and joined Újpest in 2001. He spent the autumn of 2002 in Újpest's second league 'B' team, Újpest FC-Fót on loan, and rejoined the first team of Újpest in 2003.

=== Sint-Truiden ===
After his debut in the Hungary national team, he joined Belgian team Sint-Truiden. In 2007, he returned from loan and joined Újpest for the third time.

=== Sion ===
On 17 July 2007, Vanczák signed a four-year contract with FC Sion. Vanczák has been playing forSion in the Swiss Super League since 2007. In 2011 he scored one of the goals as Sion defeated Neuchâtel Xamax 2–0 in the Swiss Cup Final.

== International career ==
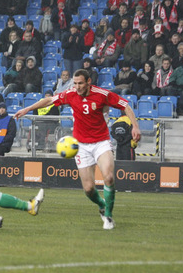
Vanczák in national team

On 3 March 2010, Vanczák scored his first international goal against Russia in a friendly match in Győr at the ETO Park. The match finished 1–1. On 6 September Vanczák scored the first goal in the Euro 2012 qualifier against Moldova at the Zimbru Stadium in Chişinău which secured a 2–0 victory for Hungary.

Lionel Messi was sent off on his international debut for Argentina in a friendly against Hungary on 17 August 2005, after being judged to have fouled Vanczák.

== Career statistics ==
Appearances and goals by national team and year
National team	Year	Apps	Goals
Hungary	2004	2	0
Hungary	2005	10	0
Hungary	2006	7	0
Hungary	2007	9	0
Hungary	2008	9	0
Hungary	2009	7	0
Hungary	2010	7	1
Hungary	2011	9	1
Hungary	2012	7	0
Hungary	2013	9	2
Hungary	2014	2	0
Hungary	2015	1	0
Total		79	4

Score and Result lists Hungary's goals first

#	Date	Venue	Opponent	Score	Result	Competition
1	3 March 2010	ETO Park, Győr, Hungary	Russia	1–0	1–1	Friendly
2	6 September 2011	Zimbru Stadium, Chişinău, Moldova	Moldova	1–0	0–2	2012 UEFA Euro qualifying
3	22 March 2013	Ferenc Puskás Stadium, Budapest, Hungary	Romania	1–0	2–2	2014 FIFA World Cup qualification
4	6 June 2013	ETO Park, Győr, Hungary	Kuwait	1–0	1–0	Friendly

== Honours ==
Újpest

- Hungarian Cup: 2001-02

FC Sion

- Swiss Cup: 2008–09, 2010–11
