= Arnaud Bühler =

Swiss footballer (born 1985)

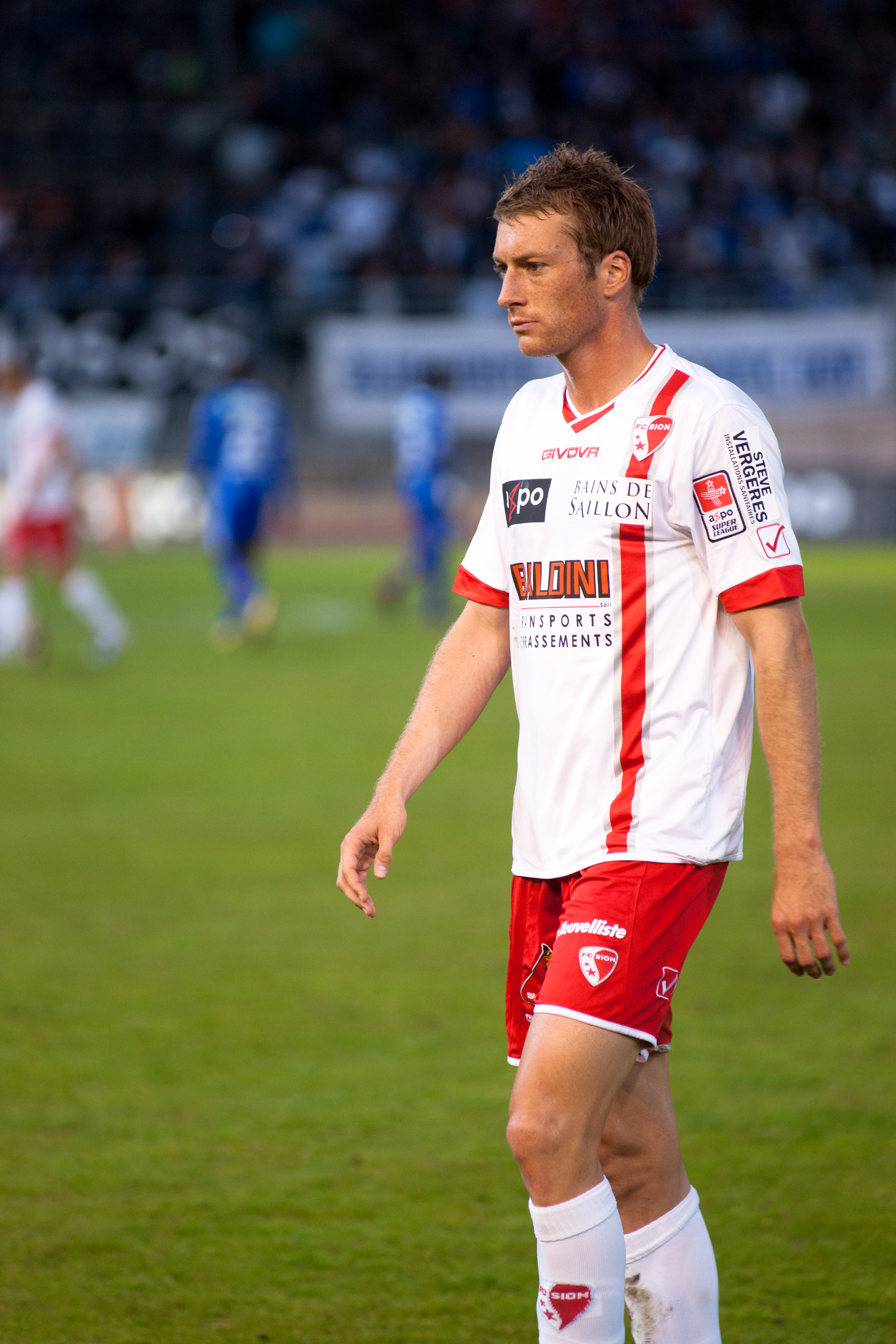

Personal information
- Date of birth: 17 January 1985 (age 41)
- Place of birth: Baulmes, Switzerland
- Height: 1.87 m (6 ft 2 in)
- Position: Defender

Team information
- Current team: FC Bavois

Youth career
- 1994–1997: FC Baulmes
- 1997–2001: Yverdon-Sport FC
- 2001–2002: Lausanne Sports

Senior career*
Years	Team	Apps	(Gls)
2002–2003	Lausanne Sports	12	(1)
2003–2004	Liverpool	?	(?)
2003–2005	FC Aarau	55	(1)
2005–2006	Sochaux	12	(0)
2006–2014	Sion	152	(9)
2015	Szombathelyi Haladás	7	(0)
2016–2017	Lausanne Sports	26	(1)
2017–2018	FC Wil	33	(1)
2018–	FC Bavois	0	(0)

International career
- Switzerland U-17
- Switzerland U-21
Medal record
Men's football
Representing Switzerland
UEFA European Under-17 Championship
Winner	2002 Denmark
- * Club domestic league appearances and goals as of 10:33, 7 August 2018 (UTC)

Arnaud Bühler (born 17 January 1985) is a Swiss football defender, who currently plays for FC Bavois. Bühler is a former youth international and was in the Swiss U-17 squad that won the 2002 U-17 European Championships.

== Honours ==
Switzerland U-17

- UEFA U-17 European Champion: 2002

Sion

- Swiss Cup: 2010–11
