= Vullnet Basha =

Albanian footballer (born 1990)

Personal information
- Full name: Vullnet Xhevat Basha
- Date of birth: 11 July 1990 (age 36)
- Place of birth: Lausanne, Switzerland
- Height: 1.76 m (5 ft 9 1/2 in)
- Position: Midfielder

Team information
- Current team: Wisła Kraków (sporting director)

Youth career
- 2001–2006: Lausanne-Sport

Senior career*
Years	Team	Apps	(Gls)
2006–2010	Lausanne-Sport	61	(4)
2010–2011	Grasshopper	17	(0)
2011–2012	Neuchâtel	11	(0)
2012–2015	Sion	42	(0)
2014–2015	→ Real Zaragoza (loan)	23	(1)
2015–2016	Ponferradina	30	(3)
2016–2017	UCAM Murcia	20	(1)
2017–2021	Wisła Kraków	82	(4)
2021–2022	Ionikos	4	(0)
2022–2024	Wisła Kraków	29	(1)
Total		319	(14)

International career
2007–2008	Switzerland U18	1	(0)
2008–2009	Switzerland U19	11	(3)
2009–2011	Switzerland U20	5	(0)
2011–2013	Switzerland U21	3	(0)
2013	Albania	1	(0)
- * Club domestic league appearances and goals

Vullnet Xhevat Basha (born 11 July 1990) is a former professional footballer who played as a midfielder. He is currently the sporting director of Polish Ekstraklasa club Wisła Kraków. Born in Switzerland, he represented that nation at youth international levels but played for Albania at senior level.

== Club career ==
=== Real Zaragoza ===
On 8 August 2014, Basha joined Segunda División side Real Zaragoza on season-long loan from Sion. The deal included a buyout option.

=== Ponferradina ===
On 25 July 2015, Basha joined Ponferradina where he penned a one-year contract. He was presented to the media on the very same day, where he was allocated the squad number 4.

=== Murcia ===
On 15 July 2016, Basha signed with UCAM Murcia CF among Jonathan Mejía.

=== Wisła Kraków ===
On 10 August 2017, he signed a contract with Wisła Kraków.

== International career ==
Basha represented Switzerland at the 2009 UEFA European Under-19 Football Championship.

On 25 April 2013, Basha declared that he will follow the example of his older brother, Migjen Basha, and play for Albania, since he is liked by coach Gianni de Biasi.

On 24 May 2013, Basha received the Albanian citizenship along with four fellow players Azdren Llullaku, Jurgen Gjasula, Amir Abrashi and Ilir Berisha.

He played in his only match for Albania against Armenia in an international friendly on 14 August 2013, which ended in a 2–0 win at Qemal Stafa Stadium.

== Honours ==
Wisła Kraków

- Polish Cup: 2023–24
