= Andris Vaņins =

Latvian footballer

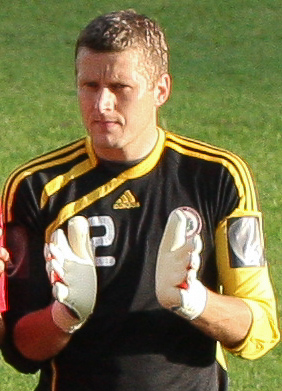
- Vaņins playing for Latvia

Personal information
- Date of birth: 30 April 1980 (age 46)
- Place of birth: Ilūkste, Latvian SSR, Soviet Union
- Height: 1.86 m (6 ft 1 in)
- Position: Goalkeeper

Team information
- Current team: Latvia U-19 (Goalkeeping coach)

Youth career
- FK Ilūkste
- Ventspils

Senior career*
Years	Team	Apps	(Gls)
1997–2003	Ventspils	86	(0)
2003–2005	FC Moscow-2	38	(0)
2005	FK Venta	1	(0)
2006–2009	Ventspils	78	(0)
2009–2016	Sion	223	(0)
2016–2020	FC Zürich	59	(0)
Total		485	(0)

International career
2000–2020	Latvia	100	(0)

Managerial career
- 2020–2022: Sion (Goalkeeping coach)
- 2023 -: Latvia U-19
- * Club domestic league appearances and goals

Andris Vaņins (born 30 April 1980) is a Latvian former professional footballer who works as a goalkeeping coach for Latvia national under-19 football team. A goalkeeper, he most notably played for Sion, making over 200 league appearances. At international level, he earned 100 caps for the Latvia national team.

== Club career ==
=== Ventspils ===
Vaņins started his professional football career in 1997, when he was only 17 years old. His first club was FK Ventspils. In 2003, he left the Virsliga league in Latvia, signing a contract with FC Torpedo-ZIL Moscow.

=== FC Moscow ===
In 2003 Vaņins signed a contract with FC Moscow. He could not manage to get into the first team, mostly being used in the reserves. As playing for the reserve team did not please the Latvian international, he decided to leave.

=== FK Venta ===
In 2005, Vaņins returned to Latvia. FK Venta offered him a contract, which Vaņins accepted. He did not play much there either and the club went bankrupt in the second half of the season. The first-team players, including Vaņins, were released.

=== Return to Ventspils ===
Having become a free agent, Vaņins agreed to a contract with FK Ventspils. He became the first-choice goalkeeper at the club and played there for three and a half years. In 2006, 2007 and 2008 he was named the best goalkeeper of the season in the LMT Virslīga, as well as the Latvian Footballer of the Year in 2008. In 2009, he started looking for a club abroad, but eventually he had to start the next season with FK Ventspils, because of unsuccessful negotiations. In February 2009 he went on trial with the Russian Premier League club Rubin Kazan.

=== Sion ===
In the middle of FK Ventspils' season Vaņins joined Swiss Super League club FC Sion on a three-year contract. He went on to become first-choice goalkeeper. His debut for the club was on 19 August 2009 in a 2–0 loss against Fenerbahçe. His first clean sheet came against FC Echallens. He was named the best goalkeeper of the league after the first and the second round. In his first season at FC Sion, Vaņins played in all of the games and was named the club's best player of the season. The Swiss portal sport.ch named him the best goalkeeper of the Swiss Super League of the 2009–10 season. After the 2010–11 season Vaņins was again named the club's best player by the team's fans, who gave him 34% votes in a survey via Facebook. After the 2011 season he was also named the best goalkeeper of the season in the "Swiss Golden Player Award" ceremony. In October 2013, Vaņins' contract at the club was extended till June 2017.

=== FC Zürich ===
On 17 June 2016, Vaņins was signed by FC Zürich on a three-year contract. He made his league debut for the club on 25 July 2016 in a 2–0 home victory over FC Winterthur, playing the full 90 minutes. In July 2020 his contract was not renewed.

== International career ==
Vaņins made his international debut for Latvia in 2000 in a 3–1 loss against Slovakia. In summer 2007, when the first-choice keeper Aleksandrs Koliņko suffered a long-term injury, head coach Aleksandrs Starkovs faced a choice to either let Vaņins or Deniss Romanovs play. Vaņins was chosen to be the replacement, and after that he became the first-choice goalkeeper of the team. On 10 October 2019, Vaņins played his 100th match for Latvia in a 3–0 loss against Poland.

== Post-playing career ==
On 31 August 2020, Vaņins retired from playing and returned to Sion as a goalkeeper coach.

== Personal life ==
Andris Vaņins is married and has two sons.

== Honours ==
Ventspils

- Virsliga: 2006, 2007, 2008
- Latvian Cup: 2007

Sion

- Swiss Cup: 2010–11, 2014–15

FC Zürich

- Swiss Cup: 2017–18
- Challenge League: 2016–17

Latvia

- Baltic Cup: 2008, 2012

Individual

- Virsliga Best Goalkeeper: 2006, 2007, 2008
- Latvian Footballer of the Year: 2008, 2013, 2015, 2016, 2017
- Swiss Super League Best Goalkeeper: 2009–10, 2010–11
- FC Sion Player of the Season: 2009–10, 2010–11, 2011–12, 2012–13

== See also ==
- List of men's footballers with 100 or more international caps
