= 2014–15 FC Basel season =

FC Basel
2014–15 season
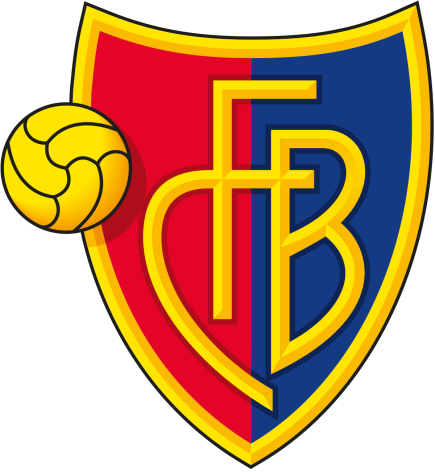
- Owner: FCB Holding AG
- Chairman: Bernhard Heusler
- Manager: Paulo Sousa
- Ground: St. Jakob-Park
- Super League: 1st
- Swiss Cup: Runners-up
- Champions League: Round of 16
- Top goalscorer: League: Shkëlzen Gashi (21); All: Shkëlzen Gashi (25)
- Highest home attendance: Swiss League: 33,372 vs. Zürisch (9 August 2014); Champions League: 36,000 vs. Liverpool (1 October 2014); 36,000 vs. Real Madrid (26 November 2014 )
- Lowest home attendance: Swiss League: 25,304 vs. Vaduz (28 February 2015); Champions League: 34,464 vs. Porto (28 February 2015)
Home colours	Away colours

The 2014–15 FC Basel season was the 122nd season in club history and the club's 20th consecutive season in the top flight of Swiss football.

Basel were the reigning Swiss Super League champions. They prepared their season with various warm-up matches against teams from Switzerland, Austria and Czech Republic. Their 2014–15 Swiss Super League season began on 19 July with an away game against Aarau. Basel qualified for the 2014–15 UEFA Champions League, starting in the group stage. They were drawn in Group B against Real Madrid, Liverpool and Ludogorets Razgrad and started on 16 July with an away tie against Real Madrid at the Santiago Bernabéu Stadium. In the first round of the 2014–15 Swiss Cup, played on 23 August 2014, Basel were drawn away against CS Italia. The final was played on 7 June 2015.

== Club ==
=== FC Basel Holding AG ===
The FC Basel Holding AG owns 75% of FC Basel 1893 AG and the other 25% is owned by the club FC Basel 1893 members. The club FC Basel 1893 functions as a base club independent of the holding company and the AG. FC Basel 1893 AG is responsible for the operational business of the club, e.g. the 1st team, a large part of the youth department and the back office are affiliated there. All decisions that affect the club FC Basel 1893 are made within the AG.

=== Club management ===
The FC Basel 120th AGM took place in April 2014 and was held in Basel's congress center. The members of the board were all re-elected unanimously. These are president Bernhard Heusler, vice-president Adrian Knup, sport director Georg Heitz, financial manager Stephan Werthmüller and marketing manager René Kamm. The other three directors are Reto Baumgartner since 2008, Dominik Donzé since 2009 and Benno Kaiser since 1999 and they were also willing to continue and they were also elected without counter-votes.

Chairman	(Switzerland) Mr Bernhard Heusler
Vice Chairman	(Switzerland) Mr Adrian Knup
Finances	(Switzerland) Mr Stephan Werthmüller
Sportdirector	(Switzerland) Mr Georg Heitz
Marketing	(Switzerland) Mr René Kamm
Director	(Switzerland) Mr Reto Baumgartner
Director	(Switzerland) Mr Dominik Donzé
Director	(Switzerland) Mr Benno Kaiser
Ground (capacity and dimensions)	St. Jakob-Park (38,512) (37,500 for international matches) / 120x80 m)

Updated to match played 1 July 2014
Source: FCB Official Site

=== Team management ===
Basel's team manager was Paulo Sousa. On 28 May 2014, Basel announced he had signed a three-year contract. His assistants were Ignacio Torreño, Víctor Sánchez and Manuel Cordeiro, all three of which were brought in by Sousa. Massimo Colomba remained the goalkeeper coach. Massimo Ceccaroni was head of the FCB Youth System, while the head coach of the Youth Team (U–21) was Thomas Häberli.

Position	Staff
Manager	(Portugal) Paulo Sousa since 18 June 2014
1 Assistant manager	Ignacio Torreño
2 Assistant manager	Víctor Sánchez
3 Assistant manager	Manuel Cordeiro
Goalkeeper Coach	(Switzerland) Massimo Colomba
Team Administration	(Switzerland) Gustav Nussbaumer
Youth Team Coach	(Switzerland) Thomas Häberli
Youth Team Co-Coach	(Switzerland) Roland Heri

Last updated: 1 July 2014
Source: FCB Official Site

== Overview ==
=== Offseason and preseason ===
At the end of the 2013–14 FC Basel season, four first-team players left the club to continue their careers elsewhere: Yann Sommer to Borussia Mönchengladbach; Valentin Stocker to Hertha BSC; Kay Voser to Fulham; and Admir Seferagić to Schaffhausen. Moreover, David Degen retired from football. Basel's four biggest signings for the beginning of the new season were Tomáš Vaclík from Sparta Prague; Yoichiro Kakitani from Cerezo Osaka; Derlis González from Benfica; and Shkëlzen Gashi from Grasshopper. Also new to the team were Luca Zuffi, who transferred from Thun, and Walter Samuel, who joined from Internazionale on a free transfer.

=== Midseason ===
During the winter break, two team members transferred to Bundesliga clubs: Serey Dié to VfB Stuttgart and Marcelo Díaz to Hamburger SV. Two further players were loaned out: Naser Aliji to Vaduz from 17 January until 30 June 2015, and Giovanni Sio to Bastia from 1 February until 30 June 2015. In the other direction, on 10 January, Basel announced that left-back Adama Traoré had joined from Vitória de Guimarães, signing a three-and-a-half-year contract.

== The campaign ==
=== Domestic league ===
The club's primary objective for the team in the new season was for them to win the Swiss Super League championship for the sixth-straight year.

First half of season

. Basel's 2014–15 Swiss Super League season began well with an away victory on 19 July against Aarau. Basel won their next three matches as well, two at home against Luzern and Zürich and one away against Thun. However, this run was stopped in the fifth round after Basel lost 2–0 at home to St. Gallen, with Albert Bunjaku scoring both goals for the guests. Two further victories, away against Sion in the Stade Tourbillon and at home against Young Boys, were followed by a defeat at the Letzigrund against Grasshopper. At this point, criticism started mounting against new manager Paulo Sousa from the local press, in part due to his continual squad rotation, not only player but also position rotation for the players. Sousa himself, kept answering by referring to “a process”. A home win against Vaduz was followed by a disappointing home draw against Thun and an upsetting defeat against St. Gallen at the AFG Arena. By this time, criticism had risen to its highest, even from the local fan clubs. However, following four wins from the following five league matches, the negative voices slowly changed into a positive direction. In round 17, as league leaders, Basel played the away tie against second-placed Zürich and won 2–1; Shkëlzen Gashi scored both goals. At the end of the first half of the season, Basel, with 41 points, led the league table, eight points ahead of their nearest rivals Zürich and the Young Boys.

Second half of season

Basel started into the second half of the season with that advantage and with a victory away from home against the Grasshoppers. However, a home draw against Sion followed, then a defeat in the Stade de Suisse against the Young Boys, who moved closer in the table, and again, the criticism mounted against head coach Sousa. Repeatedly, from both press and fans, as the rotation of players and positions continued. Sousa continued to refer to “a process”. The triple load, domestic league, cup and Champions League required this rotation. The elimination from the Champions League worked another negative feeling, but victories in the quarterfinal and semi-final of the cup and six victories in the league worked positive. Amongst these were the 4–1 away big win against Luzern, goal scoreres 2x Gashi, Delgado, Callà, and the two home big wins, 6–0 against Aarau, goal scorers, 2x Gashi, 2x Delgado, 2x Streller, and 5–1 against Zürich, hattrick Embolo. With these victories FCB took a big step towards the championship title, as they then led the table with ten points.

However, the home game against FC Zürich was overshadowed by a ten-minute interruption. The moods had already been heated, following the red cards against Davide Chiumiento and Shkëlzen Gashi, then because pyrotechnic material flew close to the playing field after the Zürich goal, especially from the guest fan-sector, the referee interrupted the game and sent both teams into the changing rooms. Then, after the match there were further incidents outside the stadium.

Despite a home defeat against Luzern and an away defeat against Aarau, Basel moved clear at the top of the table. They won the championship 12 points ahead of Young Boys and 25 points above third placed Zürich. The club's aim of the championship title had been achieved.

=== Domestic cup ===
The club's clear aim for the Basel team for the 2014–15 Swiss Cup was for them to regain the cup title. In the previous two seasons, they had ended both cup competitions as runners-up. In the first-round teams from Super League and Challenge League were seeded and could not play against each other. In a match, the home advantage was granted to the team from the lower league.

CS Italien GE ( 23 August 2014)

Basel were drawn against CS Italien GE, an amateur team who at that time played in the 2. Liga, the sixth tier of Swiss football. The match was played in Stade des Arberes in Meyrin with an attendance of 2,650 fans. As expected, the amateurs had no chance. The FCB 4–0 victory was a clear victory, however, it was not a big win, it was not a show of force, as one could have expected. But it was a seriously downplayed performance against a second division club five classes lower. CS Italien managed exactly one shot at Germano Vailati's goal, while FCB had further chances in addition to the goals from Delgado (7th), Embolo (30th), Frei (53rd) and Gashi (93rd), some were unfortunate and some were excessively playful, but they remained unused chances.

Winterthur (21 September 2014)

In the second-round teams from Super League were seeded, the home advantage was granted to the team from the lower league, if applicable. Basel were drawn against Winterthur, who played in the second tier of Swiss football. The match was played in the Schützenwiese and referee was Stephan Studer. Head coach Paulo Sousa let the Basel team play without various of their top performers such as Marco Streller, Fabian Frei and Shkelzen Gashi for this cup tie. Others stepped in for this trio. First and foremost, the 17-year-old striker Breel Embolo, who decided the game early with his goals in the 36th and 42nd minute to lead the game 3–0 at half time. In the 67th minute, the teenager also scored the 4–0 and completed his hattrick. The first Basel goal was scored by Mohamed Elneny in the 32nd minute with a shot from 20 meters, that found its way into the goal via the inside of the post. Basel had a difficult first 30 minutes. Winterthur played out some good moves and created good chances to score, before the first Basel goal and then, especially at the beginning of the second half, when FCB reserve keeper Germano Vailati had to make a few saves. Among other things, he brilliantly fended off a free kick from Tunahan Cicek on 56 minutes. Then, at the latest after the 0–4 and the dismissal of Dennis Iapichino, for a last grasp foul in the 71st, the hosts’ resistance was broken in front of the 5,050 spectators in the sold-out stadium.

Wohlen (29 October 2014)

In the third round, matches between teams from the Super League were avoided as much as possible. Two clashes of this kind took place anyway. The team from the lower league received home rights, otherwise the team drawn first got home rights. Basel were drawn against second tier Wohlen, who were then the Swiss Challenge League leaders. The match was played in the Stadion Niedermatten in Wohlen, which has a capacity of 3,734, so the hosts’ built an additional grandstand for their fans and the attendance on the matchday was 4,100 spectators. Referee in this tie was Adrien Jaccottet. The FCB team, who competed without Shkelzen Gashi and Serey Die, among others, undoubtedly wielded the finer blade. With their first two chances at goal, FC Basel proved the difference in Wohlen. After eleven minutes, the Japanese attacker Yoichiro Kakitani converted the cross from Matias Delgado with a side-kick. Five minutes before the break, Kakitani provided an ideal pass into Giovanni Sio's path, which Sio safely netted to make it 2–1 at half time. In between, Mërgim Brahimi in the 14th minute had brought the underdogs back into the game with a foul penalty. With increasing playing time, the difference in class became more visible. The favourite let the ball circulate skilfully within their own ranks and gave FC Wohlen no further significant chances to score. The way that the FCB team brought the victory over the rounds was masterful. Substitute Breel Embolo ended the game in the 91st minute.

Münsingen (4 March 2015)

There was no home advantage granted in the draw for the quarter-finals. SC Buochs, from the fifth tier of Swiss football, were the lowest-ranked team in this round and FC Münsingen from the third tier were also still in the competition. The other six teams were from the Super League. Basel were drawn away against Münsingen. This was a repeat of the second-round clash in the previous season, in which a record attendance of 4,100 fans were present in the Sportanlage Sandreutenen. The hosts rebuilt the additional grandstands for this clash as well and again this time the attendance was over 4,000 fans. The Basel team were able to ensure clear conditions early on in the game, by the interval they were already leading 5–0. The amateur team from Münsingen were overwhelmed from the beginning. Time after time their defence was overrun by the FCB attackers. The Japanese attacker Yoichiro Kakitani shone out above the others with his hattrick. The outsider, who had eliminated Wil in the previous round, had nothing against this dominance. The 0–1 in the seventh minute would not have been necessary from the hosts' point of view, because it was made possible by a gift from goalie Lars Müller. The goalkeeper had rushed out of his goal, but he failed to block the ball against Ahmed Hamoudi, and so the Egyptian was able to calmly slide the leather into the empty goal. Basel never gave up the game dictation, although they played without various top performers. Regular goalkeeper Tomas Vaclik, Taulant Xhaka and Derlis Gonzalez remained on the bench. Marco Streller, Shkelzen Gashi and Fabian Schär did not even figure in the squad. Münsingen were able to score a consolation goal in the closing stages to make it 1–6. Following a cross from Daniel Preradovic, Christian Plüss poked the ball over the line in the middle. Both players had been substituted in.

St. Gallen (8 April 2015)

In the semi-final St. Gallen were drawn at home in the AFG Arena against Basel. Goal getter Shkelzen Gashi put Basel in the front after a quarter of an hour, the pass came from Breel Embolo, who had out danced three opponents following an error by Daniele Russo. At halftime it was 0–2. Mario Mutsch, who was put under pressure from Gashi, unluckily deflected a corner kick from Matias Delgado into his own goal. On 60 minutes Embolo served Gashi with a splendid 30-meter pass. Centre back Russo hesitated, not only this time, and the goal getter slotted home with a hard, low shot into the far corner. After an hour the game was decided in this one-sided football festival in front of 16,690 spectators. Džengis Čavušević was granted the consolation goal in the 87th minute for the never giving up and always combative St. Gallen team. With FC Basel, the technical, tactical and more fluent team made it into the final in their own stadium. Alongside double goal scorer Gashi, Breel Embolo stood out from the well-rehearsed and ball-safe FCB ensemble. Embolo skilfully retreated when St. Gallen had ball possession, in order to rush forwards at high speed from the second row on counter-attacks He prepared two hits and with his dribbling was a constant source of danger for the St. Gallen defence. A downer for the 18-year-old Swiss Neo-International was the yellow card that he was shown by referee Stephan Klossner after 18 minutes. Since it was his second warning in the cup competition, the attacking talent was suspended for the final.

Sion (7 June 2015)

The Final was played on 7 June 2015 against Sion and with an attendance of 35,674 fans the St. Jakob-Park was sold out. Referee was Nikolaj Hänni. An ex-Basler was the match winner for Sion. The Portuguese technical genius Carlitos played the two deadly passes into the depth, which led to the 1–0 by goal getter Moussa Konaté on 18 minutes and the 2–0 by Edimilson Fernandes on 50 minutes. Carlitos himself scored the goal for the 3–0 final result after an hours play. He scored after a cross from Elsad Zverotić with a diving header.

Conclusion

As from the FCB point of view, the club's cup aim to reach the final was achieved. However, the defeat in this height was an embarrassment. It was also a big disappointment because this was the third cup final in succession that the team had reached and had ended defeated.

=== Champions League ===
Basel entered into the Champions League in the group stage. Their initial aim is to remain in the competition and reach the Champions League knockout phase. Third position in the group would entitle them to a slot in the Europa League knockout phase and this was their minimum aim. The draw was held on 28 August 2014 at the Grimaldi Forum in Monaco. Basel were seeded into pot 2 and were drawn into Group B together with Real Madrid, the title holders and top seeded in pot 1, Liverpool from pot 3, who had qualified as runners-up in the 2013–14 Premier League, and Ludogorets Razgrad, who as Bulgarian football league champions had qualified to pot 4 by beating FC Steaua București in the play-off round.

Real Madrid (16 September 2014)

Basels first game was on 16 September, an away tie against Real in the stadium Santiago Bernabéu with an attendance of 65,364 fans. This first tie turned out very bad for Basel. The home team dominated ball possession from the very beginning, but the first two efforts from Luka Modrić and Cristiano Ronaldo both flew over the crossbar. As it seemed that Basel had over stood the start furioso, full-back Nacho's cross was deflected by Marek Suchý into his own goal after just 14 minutes. Basel almost drew level 2 minutes later, but Marco Streller sent Taulant Xhaka's cross into the side netting. Basel's goalkeeper Tomáš Vaclík was beaten again on 30 minutes, Modrić's pass over the defence fell into the path of Gareth Bale, who lifted the ball over the outrushing keeper and tapped it into an empty goal. This started Real's best period, another minute later Ronaldo doubled up, as Modrić and Bale set him up. On 37 minutes Karim Benzema's effort was deflected, but Vaclík was able to claw it away, however, James Rodríguez pushed the ball home. Exactly one minute later Luca Zuffi played a neat through ball to Derlis Gonzalez, who raced in to fire the ball low across Iker Casillas into the far corner. After the break the game cooled down. Basel had a good chance as Gonzalez received a ball that had come over the defenders, but Casillas showed a stunning reaction. Minutes later Basel centre-back Fabian Schär hit a long-range shot that beat the Real goalie but bounced off the post. On 79 minutes Benzema netted the last and Basel lost 1–5. Despite the fact that Basel had 48% ball possession, they were never really in the game. A rampant Real Madrid had eased Basel aside toward the end of the first period.

Liverpool (1 October 2014)

On matchday 2, Basel had a home game at the St. Jakob-Park with a sold-out attendance of 36,000 fans against Liverpool. The hosts could have been forgiven their cautious approach into this game, following their heavy defeat against Real in the Spanish capital two weeks earlier. Head coach Paulo Sousa made a bold decision to give 17-year-old forward Breel Embolo his maiden Champions League start. Basel started well into the game. In the early stages Mohamed Elneny snapped at Steven Gerrard's heels and won ball possession. But the Liverpool captain made amends for losing the ball, because as it came to Basel captain Marco Streller, Gerrard blocked Streller's promising shot. Goalkeeper Simon Mignolet stood exactly right as an Elneny's effort bent inward and goalward and soon afterwards Ahmed Hamoudi hammered his shot just beyond the far post, just as Basel produced the more threatening chances before the half time break. The most dangerous of these chances came on 35 minutes as Geoffroy Serey Die received Marco Streller's return one/two pass and out dribbled two challenges, but his angled shot was kicked away by Mignolet. Marco Streller scored the decisive goal seven minutes after the break. He was spot on after a corner kick and a save from Liverpool goalkeeper Mignolet. In its creation, the goal was lucky because Mignolet had been checked by his own defender and thus enabled Streller to shoot. But it was anything other than a "lucky punch" if one looks at the entire game. FCB were the better team, they had clear advantages in the midfield area, they won a majority of the one against one duels and, at least until the 1–0, they also had more than the better share of the game. After the goal, Basel only had to worry two or three times about their victory. The closest to the equaliser was Mario Balotelli. Just after the hour, the Italian striker forced Basel goalkeeper Tomas Vaclik with a powerful free kick from about 25 meters to an unorthodox parade with his chest. A little later, Raheem Sterling and Lazar Marković also had opportunities. But Basel wouldn't let them take the victory from themselves anymore. A victory for the prestige.

Ludogorets Razgrad (22 October 2014)

Matchday 3 was a tie against Ludogorets Razgrad, who played their home matches at Vasil Levski National Stadium in Sofia instead of their regular stadium, Ludogorets Arena in Razgrad. Basel started well into the match, had more possession and made good moves and Breel Embolo had the first chance. Ludogorets first chance came on 17 minutes as a long free kick was headed towards goal, Tomáš Vaclík parried well. One minute later a knockback for the visitors, as Serey Die took on a ball from Fabian Frei in the middle of the opponents’ half he collided with Cosmin Moți. Referee Deniz Aytekin of the German Football Association showed Serey Die a very harsh direct red card. The numerical disadvantage was not obvious immediately, after a nice one/two with Davide Calla, Derlis Gonzalez almost put Basel a goal up, big save from goalie Vladislav Stoyanov. Ludogorets slowly gained the upper hand as time went by, they forced Basel back, but the FCB defence did their work, because, Ludogorets only created one single chance before the interval. In the second period the home team had more possession and created a number of chances, especially from set pieces, but goalie Vaclík was equal to them all. Going into added time Yordan Minev advanced on the left, failing an open man the full back had a shot at goal and the ball deflected slightly off Taulant Xhaka's back and caught Vaclík wrongfooted. Ludogorets late show downed ten-man Basel and won the game 1–0. At the end of the day, because Liverpool lost at home against Real, three teams were then equal on three points, Basel, Liverpool and Ludogorets Razgrad.

Ludogorets Razgrad (4 November 2014)

With 35,272 spectators the St. Jakob-Park was not quite sold-out for the return match against Ludogorets Razgrad. Basel started well into the game on this rainy evening and after just 90 seconds they had their first chance to score through Derlis Gonzalez. However, thereafter it took a long time for FCB to come up with further clear opportunities. Although they had significantly more all possession in the first half hour, over the last 30 meters there was either a lack of precision on the final pass or assertiveness. The spell broke on 34 minutes, captain Fabian Frei found the precision, with a good pass to Breel Embolo, who won the duel with Georgi Terziev and cold bloodedly put the hosts in front. The 17-year-old Cameroonian had lost a lot of balls in the start phase and had problems with the tightly knit Bulgarian defensive. Seven minutes after Embolo's opening goal, Derlis Gonzalez increased in a similar way to 2–0 and thus ensured an early decision. Fabian Frei had prepared the second goal as well, he served his team-mate with a wonderful steep pass into the depth. After the break Basel dominated territory and ball. Shkelzen Gashi increased to 3–0 from short range on 59 minutes, following a neat pass from Embolo. Another six minutes later Marek Suchy prodded home a corner from Luca Zuffi for the final result. The Swiss champions won the home game against the Bulgarian champions deservedly with 4–0 and moved up to second place in the group table.

Real Madrid (26 November 2014)

The return game against Real Madrid was three weeks after the Ludogorets game. On matchday 5 in the St. Jakob-Park was sold out with 36,000 spectators. And the fans created a gripping atmosphere with their noise, singing and passion and it was as so the home fans knew that their team required extra help to keep Madrid's star constellation from shining. Basel started well and fast into the game. The first chance fell on 12 minutes for Breel Embolo but the ball went wide. The second came for Marco Streller on 23 minutes, but he miscued. On 35 minutes Karim Benzema, who had not been seen before, entered the box with speed from the left, diagonally to the by-line outplaying Fabian Schär and passed with precision backwards to Cristiano Ronaldo, who hit the ball into the net. Basel never gave up. Until the end, the Basel team showed that they wanted more than an honourable defeat. They searched for the equaliser and that would have been an exploit against Real. Especially during the last half an hour, the FCB came up with scoring chances, the closest from Embolo. The teenager failed in the 67th minute from a tight angle on goalie Keylor Navas. Then, seconds from the end, it was substitute Ahmed Hamoudi who curled the ball inwards, but just wide of the goal. This meant Real made it five wins out of five. In the other group match Ludogorets and Liverpool drew 2–2 and Basel remained in second position in the table.

Liverpool (9 December 2014)

Matchday 6 was the match Liverpool against Basel and even before the match, the requirements were clear. Madrid were through to the next round with 15 points in the group table, Basel were second in the group with 6 points, Liverpool and Ludogorets were level on 4 points, Liverpool had the advantage of the direct meetings. So the motto was "the winner takes it all". Liverpool required all three points to reach the round of 16 for the first time since 2008/09. Basel only needed the draw to secure their first knockout-stage appearance since season 2011/12, so long as Ludogorets didn't win their match in Madrid.

Anfield had an attendance of 43,290 spectators on this cloudy and windy evening and both teams were roared on by their noisy fans, some 3,000 FCB fans had travelled in from Basel. FCB had the first chance after just 3 minutes, but Shkëlzen Gashi shot wide. Basel had expected its opponents to come forward with power, looking for chances, shooting at goal in the first 15/20 minutes. But, with the exception of an early effort by Steven Gerrard, precious little came of this initial furiousness. It wasn't necessarily just because of Liverpool's recurring problem of having to be creative, Basel head coach Paulo Sousa obviously had the right match plan in place. In the initial phase, Basel largely blocked the pass routes towards Gerrard, therefore, the playmaker had practically no influence. The Liverpool team seemed to lose their patience and they looked insecure. Raheem Sterling decided to pass back instead of trying himself after 20 minutes. The home fans reacted indignantly to this for the first time. Basel tempted Liverpool, with aggressive pressing in various situations, the home team rowed up a number of bad passes. One minute later a cross from Mohamed Elneny dropped for Marco Streller, but his shot was blocked. Liverpool's passing lacked fluency and the visitors were sharper and created the greater threat. On 25 minutes Basel's first shot on target shocked opponents and the majority of the spectators. Fabian Frei played a pass on to Luca Zuffi, he tied up Frei moving left and he shot left footed into the far bottom corner. The home fans reacted indignantly to this as well. Up until half time Basel created more good chances. The very strong Luca Zuffi was often the origin of these moves, after 30 minutes he set up Derlis Gonzalez and after 39 minutes he set up Fabian Schär after a rebound. Taulant Xhaka's cross to Streller at the far post and his side kick volley came very close. Basel dominated the first half and thoroughly deserved to be in the lead.

After the break Liverpool picked up, played more resolutely forwards created two chances but these efforts lacked precision. On 59 minutes Xhaka ran diagonally from the right sideline toward the centre and struck a shot with left, goalie Simon Mignolet was beaten, but the ball rolled inches wide. Then on 60 minutes Lazar Marković, trying to get away, struck Behrang Safari in the face. Referee Björn Kuipers of the Royal Dutch Football Association had no choice and dismissed him with red. Out of the game, the nine Liverpool outfield players achieved very little. A shot by Martin Skrtel on 68 minutes, an intervention timed to the millisecond by goalie Tomas Vaclik against Gerrard on 71 minutes. The culmination of a hectic final phase came in the 81st minute as a standard. Significantly it was captain Gerrard with a wonderful free kick to the top left corner and via the post into the net for the equaliser. Then followed a very tense finishing period, during which both teams had two/three further chances for the winning goal. Zuffi's shot brought a big save from Mignolet (83), Jordan Henderson saw Vaclík stop his deflected header on the goal-line (85), Safari's cross was missed only by inches by Gashi in front of the open goal (90+2) and at the other end as Vaclík pushed aside another Henderson effort in the 93rd minute, Basel's job was done. It was Steven Gerrard's 100th time in his career that he had scored in his own stadium and this one earnt his team the 1–1 end result and the draw.

Conclusion

Liverpool's point advanced them to the Europa League knockout phase. Here they were defeated by Beşiktaş, level on aggregate, in the penalty shoot-out. Basel advanced to the Champions League knockout phase.

From the Basel point of view this was a very successful group stage, their aim had been achieved.

=== Champions League knockout phase ===
Basel's initial Champions League aim, to remain in the competition and reach the knockout phase was achieved herewith. With the draw to the round of 16 there were indeed hopes that they could reach the next round and the next aim was communicated as reaching the quarterfinals. The draw was held on 15 December 2014 at UEFA headquarters in Nyon, Switzerland. In the draw the eight group winners were seeded and the eight group runners-up were unseeded.

Porto (18 February 2015)

Basel were drawn with the first game at home in the St. Jakob-Park to Porto. It was great atmosphere in the stadium even before the teams emerged from the tunnel. There was a decent-sized pocket of Porto fans, but they did well to make themselves heard. The attendance was a total of 34,464 spectators. Basel started the game well and in the eleventh minute Fabian Frei floated a long ball over the top of the defence and Derlis Gonzalez controlled the ball well, his finish was clever with the outside of his right boot and it's ramped up the noise even further. It was Gonzalez's third Champions League goal of the season. Porto responded and took control of the match, suddenly the game had greater fluidity. Porto had up to 60% ball possession, they created chances, but Basel held on well. Eventually Portos efforts paid off as they were awarded a penalty in the 79' minute, Danilo scored from the spot. It was a precise penalty into the bottom corner to Tomáš Vaclík's right and Porto got the away goal that they so badly wanted. A total of nine yellow cards were given during the match. At the end both teams seemed content to go into the return fixture at 1–1. The furious, physical nature of the game had evaporated somewhat as the game approached the final whistle.

Porto (10 March 2015)

Before this second leg, all talk was about how Porto would cope without Jackson Martínez, after their forward and captain was ruled out for "several weeks" with a groin problem. But the second leg in Estádio do Dragão started badly for Basel. Yacine Brahimi superbly executed a free kick in the 14th minute to put Porto one up. Any hopes that Basel had were vanquished soon after half-time as Héctor Herrera made it 2–0, bending in a shot from the edge of the penalty area. Casemiro scored with a wonderful free-kick just a few minutes later. Finally, it was Vincent Aboubakar's fine shot, after he turned around Walter Samuel, before rifling in from over 20 Meters with some 14 minutes left that gave the 4–0 end result. Samuel, who conceded the set piece for the opening goal, ended the evening with another low because he was sent off. The second leg was fairer than the physically aggressive first leg, a total of four yellow cards and one red were shown during the return match.

Conclusion

Porto advanced to the quarter-finals and were matched against Bayern Munich. Winning the first leg 3–1, they were defeated in the second leg 6–1 and, therefore lost 7–4 on aggregate. Bayern advanced to the semi-finals, but were beaten by Barcelona who then won the trophy.

== Players ==
=== First team squad ===
The following is the list of the Basel first team squad. It also includes players that were in the squad the day the season started on 19 July but subsequently left the club after that date.

As of 1 July 2014

Note: Flags indicate national team as defined under FIFA eligibility rules; some limited exceptions apply. Players may hold more than one non-FIFA nationality.

No.	Pos.	Nation	Player
1	GK	CZE	Tomáš Vaclík
3	DF	CIV	Adama Traoré
4	DF	SUI	Philipp Degen
5	DF	SUI	Arlind Ajeti
6	DF	ARG	Walter Samuel
7	MF	SUI	Luca Zuffi
8	MF	CIV	Serey Die
9	FW	SUI	Marco Streller (Captain)
10	MF	ARG	Matías Delgado
11	MF	ALB	Shkëlzen Gashi
13	DF	BUL	Ivan Ivanov
14	FW	JPN	Yoichiro Kakitani
16	DF	SUI	Fabian Schär
17	DF	CZE	Marek Suchý

No.	Pos.	Nation	Player
18	GK	SUI	Germano Vailati
19	DF	SWE	Behrang Safari
20	MF	SUI	Fabian Frei (vice-captain)
21	MF	CHI	Marcelo Díaz
23	GK	SUI	Pascal Albrecht
24	FW	EGY	Ahmed Hamoudi
25	FW	PAR	Derlis González
26	DF	ARG	Gastón Sauro
27	DF	SUI	Naser Aliji
30	FW	CIV	Giovanni Sio
33	MF	EGY	Mohamed Elneny
34	MF	ALB	Taulant Xhaka
36	FW	SUI	Breel Embolo
39	MF	SUI	Davide Callà

=== Out on loan ===
—	MF	SUI	Darko Jevtić (on loan at Lech Poznań from 11 June 2014 until 30 June 2015)
—	GK	SUI	Mirko Salvi (on loan at Biel from 1 July 2014 until 30 June 2015)
26	DF	ARG	Gastón Sauro (on loan at Calcio Catania from 21 August 2014 until 30 June 2015)
—	DF	SUI	Michael José Gonçalves (on loan at Wil from 12 January until 30 June 2015)
27	DF	SUI	Naser Aliji (on loan at Vaduz from 17 January until 30 June 2015)
30	FW	CIV	Giovanni Sio (on loan to Bastia from 1 February until 30 June 2015)

=== Transfers summer 2014 ===
==== In ====
1	GK	CZE	Tomáš Vaclík (from Sparta Prague)
6	DF	ARG	Walter Samuel (from Inter Milan Free transfer)
7	MF	SUI	Luca Zuffi (from FC Thun)
11	MF	ALB	Shkëlzen Gashi (from Grasshopper Club Zürich)
14	FW	JPN	Yoichiro Kakitani (from Cerezo Osaka)
25	FW	PAR	Derlis González (from S.L. Benfica)

==== Out ====
—	GK	SUI	Yann Sommer (to Borussia Mönchengladbach)
—	MF	SUI	David Degen (end of football career)
—	MF	SUI	Valentin Stocker (to Hertha BSC)
—	DF	SUI	Kay Voser (to Fulham)
—	FW	BIH	Admir Seferagić (to Schaffhausen)

=== Transfers winter 2014/15 ===
==== In ====
3	DF	CIV	Adama Traoré (from Melbourne Victory)

==== Out ====
8	MF	CIV	Serey Die (to VfB Stuttgart in the Bundesliga)
21	MF	CHI	Marcelo Díaz (to Bundesliga club Hamburger SV)

== Results and fixtures ==
Kickoff times are in CET

=== Legend ===
Win Draw Loss Postponed

=== Friendly matches ===
==== Pre- and mid-season ====
24 June 2014 Pre-season	FC Basel	3–1	Solothurn	Stadion Schützenmatte, Basel
20:00	Ar. Ajeti 24' (1:1); Sauro 38' (2:1); Embolo 57' (3:1)	FCB summary	23' (0:1) Sasso	Attendance: 750; Referee: Lionel Tschudi
Note: The match was played over 2x 30 Minutes, fair game, no bookings

27 June 2014 Pre-season	FC Köniz	1–3	Basel	Sportplatz Liebefeld, Köniz
	73' (1:3) Tugai	FCB summary	5' (0:1) Delgado; 32' (0:2) Zuffi; 53' (0:3) Al. Ajeti	Attendance: 600; Referee: Lukas Fänhdrich
Note: Fair game, no bookings

3 July 2014 Pre-season	Wacker Innsbruck	0–3	Basel	Tivoli-Neu, Innsbruck
	Željko Đokić (yellow card) 77'	FCB summary	15' (0:1) F. Frei; 43' (0:2) Streller; 52' (0:3) Embolo	Attendance: 2,000; Referee: Andreas Heiss

8 July 2014 Pre-season	Basel	0–4	Sparta Prague	Rottach-Egern, Germany
18:00 CEST	Sauro (yellow card) 47'	FCB summary	5' (0:1) Hušbauer; 8' (pen. 0:2) Hušbauer; 46' (0:3) Holek; 59' (0:4) Nhamoinesu; (yellow card) 81' Kadeřábek	Stadium: Sportplatz Birkenmoos; Attendance: 100; Referee: Peter Sippel

12 July 2014 Pre-season	Basel	2–1	Terek Grozny	Neuried bei München, Germany
15:30	Streller 28' (1:0); Zuffi 85' (pen. 2:1)	FCB summary	51' (1:1) Aílton; (yellow card) 67' Kydriashov; (red card) 90+2' Godzyur	Attendance: 250; Referee: Matthias Jöllenbeck

15 July 2014 Pre-season	Basel	1–2	Schaffhausen	Stadion Rankhof, Basel
17:00	Safari 83' (1:2)	FCB summary	21' (0:1) Almerares; 22' (0:2) Tadić	Attendance: 2,000; Referee: Alain Bieri (Solothurn)
Note: Fair game, no bookings

5 August 2014 Mid-season	Basel	6–0	Wohlen	Youth Campus Basel, Münchenstein
	Delgado 14' (1:0); Delgado 17' (pen.); Kakitani 36' (3:0); Callà 40' (4:0); Embolo 56' (5:0); Hamoudi 82' (6:0)	FCB Summary		Attendance: 50 (closed doors); Referee: Tomasz Superczynski
Note: Fair game, no bookings

15 November 2014 Mid-season	Basel	5–1	SC Dornach	St. Jakob-Park, Basel
	Callà; Sio; Gashi; Kakitani; Delgado	Summary	Jankovic	Attendance: 0 (closed doors)

==== Winter break and mid-season ====
10 January 2015 Winter break	Basel	9–0	FC Hégenheim	FC Basel Campus, Basel
10:30	Streller 7' (1:0); P. Degen 12' (2:0); González 27' (3:0); Gashi 37' (4:0); Sio 52' (5:0); Díaz 54' (6:0); Al. Ajeti 78' (7:0); Elneny 87' (8:0); Embolo 89' (pen.)	FCB summary		Attendance: 1,000; Referee: Sascha Amhof
Note: Fair game, no bookings

13 January 2015 Training camp	Basel	2–2	Karlsruher SC	Marbella Football Center, San Pedro de Alcántara
16:15	Streller 15' (1:1); Embolo (yellow card) 61'; Schär (yellow card) 62'; Samuel 86' (2:2)	FCB summary	8' (0:1) Yamada; 70' (1:2) Gordon; (yellow card) 83' Stoll; (yellow card) 90+1' Micanski	Attendance: 100; Referee: Juan Antonio Vargas

16 January 2015 Training camp	Basel	2–1	Fortuna Düsseldorf	Marbella Football Center, San Pedro de Alcántara
17:00	Delgado 22' (1:0); Kakitani 44' (2:1); Gashi (yellow card) 83'	FCB summary	23' (1:1) Liendl	Attendance: 600; Referee: Juan Antonio Vargas

20 January 2015 Training camp	Basel	3–2	Dynamo Kyiv	Marbella Football Center, San Pedro de Alcántara
16:00	Embolo 67' (1:2); Embolo 80' (2:2); Delgado 89' (pen.)	FCB summary	10' (0:1) Vida; (yellow card) 42' Gusev; 65' (0:2) Teodorczyk; (yellow card) 88' Vida	Attendance: 20; Referee: Velazquez

24 January 2015 Winter break	Basel	2–0	SC Freiburg	Stadion Schützenmatte, Basel
14:30	Streller 33' (1:0); Elneny 40' (2:0); Embolo (yellow card) (yellow-red card) 75'	FCB summary		Attendance: 1,828; Referee: Fabian Hänggi

27 January 2015 Winter break	Basel	2–1	Schaffhausen	Youth Campus Basel, Münchenstein
14:00	Delgado 11' (pen. 1:1); Kakitani 14' (2:1)	FCB summary	6' (0:1) Tadić	Attendance: 400; Referee: Alain Bieri (Solothurn)
Note: Fair game, no bookings

30 January 2015 Winter break	Eintracht Braunschweig	2–0	Basel	Eintracht-Stadion, Braunschweig
18:30	Nielsen 63' (1:0); Zuck 71' (2:0)	FCB summary		Attendance: 3,850; Referee: Harm Osmers
Note: Fair game, no bookings

27 March 2015 Mid-season	Basel	4–0	Old Boys	Youth Campus Basel, Münchenstein
15:30	Streller 19' (1:0); Korkmaz 31' (2:0); Hayoz 83' (3:0); Kakitani 86' (4:0)	FCB summary	(yellow card) 64' Gutierrez	Attendance: 200; Referee: Zenel Musa

=== Swiss Super League ===
==== First half of season ====
19 July 2014 Round 1	Aarau	1–2	Basel	Stadion Brügglifeld, Aarau
17:45	Schultz 85' (1:2)	FCB summary Soccerway summary	15' (0:1) Embolo; 38' (0:2) Aliji; (yellow card) 76' Aliji; (yellow card) 78' Frei	Attendance: 3,644; Referee: (Switzerland) Nikolaj Hänni

27 July 2014 Round 2	Basel	3–0	Luzern	St. Jakob-Park, Basel
16:00	Streller 22' (1:0); Gashi 39' (2:0); Xhaka (yellow card) 58'; Callà 90+4' (3:0)	FCB summary Soccerway summary	(yellow card) 56' Lustenberger; (yellow card) 67' Jantscher; (yellow card) 73' Lezcano	Attendance: 29,410; Referee: (Switzerland) Sascha Amhof

2 August 2014 Round 3	Thun	2–3	Basel	Arena Thun, Thun
17:45	Kaluđerović 49' (1:2); Sadik 84' (2:2); Schindelholz (yellow card) 87'	FCB summary Soccerway summary	19' (0:1) Streller; 27' (0:2) {Gashi; (yellow card) 59' Gashi; (yellow card) 74' González; (yellow card) 85' Streller; 88' (2:3) Schär	Attendance: 9,214; Referee: (Switzerland) Alain Bieri (Solothurn)

9 August 2014 Round 4	Basel	4–1	Zürich	St. Jakob-Park, Basel
20:00	Gashi 24' (1:0); Suchý (yellow card) 34'; Zuffi 39' (2:0); González (yellow card) 44'; Díaz (yellow card) 67'; Schär (yellow card) 71'; Kakitani 74' (3:1); Xhaka (yellow card) 81'; Delgado 87' (4:1)	FCB summary Soccerway summary	(yellow card) 27' Chikhaoui; 55' (2:1) Chermiti; (yellow card) 62' Yapi Yapo; (yellow card) 90+4' Kecojević	Attendance: 33,372; Referee: (Switzerland) Stephan Klossner

14 August 2014 Round 5	Basel	0–2	St. Gallen	St. Jakob-Park, Basel
20:00	Delgado (yellow card) 61'	FCB summary	(yellow card) 29' Facchinetti; 40' (0:1) Bunjaku; 44' (0:2) Bunjaku; (yellow card) 67' Rodriguez; (yellow card) 80' Herzog	Attendance: 27,483; Referee: (Switzerland) Nikolaj Hänni

17 August 2014 Round 6	Sion	2–3	Basel	Stade Tourbillon, Sion
13:45	Vanczák (yellow card) 9'; Herea 69' (1:2); Carlitos 75' (pen. 2:2); Rüfli (yellow card) 90+2'	FCB summary Summary	(yellow card) 7' Elneny; 19' (0:1) Gashi; (yellow card) 31' Suchý; 59' (0:2) Streller; 84' (o.g. 2:3) Vaņins; (yellow card) 90+2' P. Degen	Attendance: 11,800; Referee: (Switzerland) Stephan Studer

31 August 2014 Round 7	Basel	3–1	BSC Young Boys	St. Jakob-Park, Basel
16:00	González 4' (1:0); Streller 20' (2:0); Gashi (yellow card) 37'; Samuel (yellow card) 45'; Schär (yellow card) 56'; VaclíkVaclík (yellow card) 61'; González (yellow card) 64'; Streller (yellow card) 69'; Kakitani 81' (3:1)	FCB summary	(yellow card) 12' Nuzzolo; 32' (2:1) Nuzzolo; (penalty missed) 62′ Gajić; (yellow card) 69' Sanogo	Attendance: 31,103; Referee: (Switzerland) Alain Bieri (Solothurn)

13 September 2014 Round 8	Grasshopper Club	3–1	Basel	Letzigrund, Zürich
17:45	Ngamukol 12' (1:0); Dingsdag 45' (2:1); Lang 72' (3:1)	FCB summary	(yellow card) 35' Safari; 39' (1:1) Zuffi; (yellow card) 37' Díaz; (yellow card) 73' Delgado; (yellow card) 81' (yellow-red card) 83' Callà	Attendance: 7,700; Referee: (Switzerland) Sascha Amhof

23 September 2014 Round 9	Basel	3–1	Vaduz	St. Jakob-Park, Basel
19:45	Zuffi 2' (1:0); Xhaka (yellow card) 76'; Streller 80' (2:1); Hamoudi 90+3' (3:1)	FCB summary Summary	11' (pen. 1:1) Lang; (yellow card) 48' Lang; (yellow card) 44' Kaufmann	Attendance: 25,347; Referee: (Switzerland) Sandro Schärer

27 September 2014 Round 10	Basel	1–1	Thun	St. Jakob-Park, Basel
20:00	Elneny (yellow card) 47'; Xhaka 51' (1:0); Hamoudi (yellow card) 60'	FCB summary Soccerway summary	(yellow card) 31' Schindelholz; (yellow card) 36' González; (yellow card) 77' Glarner; 90' (1:1) Sadik	Attendance: 26,854; Referee: (Switzerland) Stephan Klossner

4 October 2014 Round 11	St. Gallen	2–1	Basel	AFG Arena, St. Gallen
20:00	Čavušević 85' (1:1); Bunjaku (yellow card) 90'; Bunjaku 90+3' (2:1)	FCB summary Soccerway summary	(yellow card) 35' Suchý; 56' (0:1) Callà; (yellow card) 90+4' González	Attendance: 16,366; Referee: (Switzerland) Sascha Amhof
Note: 49th minute, game interrupted due to excessive smoke development due to pyros being lit.

18 October 2014 Round 12	Young Boys	0–1	Basel	Stade de Suisse, Bern
20:00	Renato Steffen (yellow card) 45'; Guillaume Hoarau (yellow card) 69'; Moreno Costanzo (yellow card) 90+1'	FCB summary	31' (0:1) Gashi; (yellow card) 51' Aliji; (yellow card) 70' P. Degen; (yellow card) 74' Vaclík	Attendance: 22,002; Referee: (Switzerland) Nikolaj Hänni

25 October 2014 Round 13	Basel	1–1	Sion	St. Jakob-Park, Basel
20:00	Xhaka (yellow card) 47'; Sio 64' (1:1); P. Degen (yellow card) 91'; Schär (yellow card) 94'	FCB summary	51' (0:1) (yellow card) 41' Moussa Konaté; (yellow card) 88' Akolo; (yellow card) 92' Kouassi	Attendance: 26,722; Referee: (Switzerland) Alain Bieri (Solothurn)

1 November 2014 Round 14	Basel	2–0	Grasshopper Club	St. Jakob-Park, Basel
20:00	Gashi 23' (1:0); González 47' (2:0); Gashi (yellow card) 61'	FCB summary	(yellow card) 39' Kahraba; (yellow card) 74' Pavlović; (yellow card) 81' Dingsdag	Attendance: 29,339; Referee: (Switzerland) Sascha Amhof

9 November 2014 Round 15	Vaduz	0–4	Basel	Rheinpark Stadion, Vaduz
13:45	Stahel (yellow card) 3'; Muntwiler (yellow card) 26'	FCB summary	27' (0:1) Díaz; (yellow card) 38' Schär; 45+2' (0:2) Embolo; 49' (0:3) Embolo; 76' (0:4) Gashi	Attendance: 6,733 (sold out); Referee: (Switzerland) Pascal Erlachner
Note: Minute of mourning for the deceased Rainer Hasler (ex-Vaduz)

23 November 2014 Round 16	Basel	3–0	Aarau	St. Jakob-Park, Basel
13:45	Gashi 86' (2:0); Díaz (yellow card) 56'; Sousa (head coach) (red card) 71'; Gashi 86' (2:0); Embolo 90+1' (3:0)	FCB summary	(yellow card) 39' Radice; (yellow card) 77' Andrist	Attendance: 28,742; Referee: (Switzerland) Nikolaj Hänni
Note: 71 minutes Paulo Sousa (head coach) sent onto the stands

30 November 2014 Round 17	Zürich	1–2	Basel	Letzigrund, Zürich
16:00	Kecojević (yellow card) 75'; Chikhaoui 88' (pen. 1:2)	FCB summary	41' (0:1) Gashi; (yellow card) 53' Gashi; (yellow card) 86' Díaz; 90+4' (1:2) Gashi	Attendance: 16,302; Referee: (Switzerland) Stephan Studer

6 December 2014 Round 18	Luzern	0–3	Basel	Swissporarena, Luzern
17:45	Samuel (yellow card) 19'; Delgado 55' (0:1); Delgado 61' (0:2); Embolo 90+3' (0:3)	FCB summary	(yellow card) 16' Affolter; (yellow card) 17' Jantscher	Attendance: 11,830; Referee: (Switzerland) Nikolaj Hänni

==== Second half of season ====
8 February 2015 Round 19	Grasshopper Club	2–4	Basel	Letzigrund, Zürich
16:00 CET	Abrashi (yellow card) 31'; Dabour 49' (1:1); Bauer (yellow card) 56'; Lang 74' (2:3)	FCB summary Soccerway summary	28' (0:1) Elneny; 69' (1:2) Gashi; 72' (1:3) Streller; 81' (2:4) Callà; (yellow card) 84' González; (yellow card) 86' Delgado	Attendance: 6,300; Referee: (Switzerland) Alain Bieri (Solothurn)

14 February 2015 Round 20	Basel	1–1	Sion	St. Jakob-Park, Basel
17:45 CET	Vaclík (red card) 45+1'; Gashi 68' (1:1)	FCB summary	(yellow card) 6' Fernandes; 45+1' (pen. 0:1) Pa Modou; (yellow card) 56' Salatić; (yellow card) 70' Lacroix; (yellow card) 74' Akolo; (yellow card) 78' (yellow-red card) 90' Perrier; (yellow card) 86' Ziegler	Attendance: 25,363; Referee: (Switzerland) Sascha Amhof

22 February 2015 Round 21	Young Boys	4–2	Basel	Stade de Suisse, Bern
16:00	Gerndt 10' (1:0); Lecjaks (yellow card) 16'; Hoarau (yellow card) 24'; Gerndt 27' (2:0); Gajić 60' (3:0); Vilotić (yellow card) 76'; Hadergjonaj (yellow card) 84'; Hoarau 90+3' (4:2)	FCB summary	(yellow card) 15' González; (yellow card) 41' Safari; 71' (3:1) Gashi; (yellow card) 88' Gashi; (yellow card) 90' Traoré; 90+2' (3:2) Streller	Attendance: 17,420; Referee: (Switzerland) Stephan Klossner

28 February 2015 Round 22	Basel	1–0	Vaduz	St. Jakob-Park, Basel
20:00	Luca Zuffi (yellow card) 23'; F. Frei 41' (1:0); F. Frei (yellow card) 48'; Suchý (yellow card) 80'	FCB summary	(yellow card) 42' Neumayr	Attendance: 25,304; Referee: (Switzerland) Fedayi San

7 March 2015 Round 23	Basel	3–0	Thun	St. Jakob-Park, Basel
20:00	Xhaka (yellow card) 41'; Gashi 45+1' (1:0); Streller 52' (2:0); Gashi 58' (3:0)	FCB summary	(yellow card) 40' Ferreira	Attendance: 26.354; Referee: (Switzerland) Pascal Erlachner

15 March 2015 Round 24	St. Gallen	2–2	Basel	AFG Arena, St. Gallen
16:00	Sikorski 16' (1:1); Mutsch (yellow card) 17'; Tréand 42' (2:2); Janjatović (yellow card) 69'	FCB summary	9' (0:1) Delgado; 34' (1:2) Callà; (yellow card) 66' Traoré; (yellow card) 69' Xhaka; (yellow card) 74' Embolo; (yellow card) 89' Streller	Attendance: 17,457; Referee: (Switzerland) Sandro Schärer

21 March 2015 Round 25	Luzern	1–4	Basel	Swissporarena, Luzern
17:45	Omlin (yellow card) 48'; Bozanic (yellow card) 48'; Puljić 52' (1:3); Lustenberger (yellow card) 81'	FCB summary	(yellow card) 31' Xhaka; 32' (0:1) Gashi; 47' (pen. 0:2) Delgado; 49' (0:3) Gashi; (yellow card) 81' P. Degen; 87' (1:4) Callà	Attendance: 13,002; Referee: (Switzerland) Stephan Studer

4 April 2015 Round 26	Basel	6–0	Aarau	St. Jakob-Park, Basel
20:00	Delgado 6' (pen. 1:0); Streller 16' (2:0); Gashi 22' (3:0); Streller 33' (4:0); Delgado 36' (5:0); Gashi 63' (6:0); Samuel (yellow card) 70'; Hamoudi (yellow card) 79'	FCB summary	(yellow card) 27' Lüscher; (yellow card) 71' Andrist	Attendance: 26,979; Referee: (Switzerland) Sandro Schärer

12 April 2015 Round 27	Basel	5–1	Zürich	St. Jakob-Park, Basel
16:00	Gashi 24'; Gashi (red card) 44'; Streller (yellow card) 44'; Embolo 45+1' (2:0); Embolo 47' (3:0); Embolo 78' (4:1); Djimsiti 88' (o.g. 5:1)	FCB summary	(yellow card) 8' Etoundi; (yellow card) 27' Kajević; (yellow card) 32' Gavranović; (red card) 38' Davide Chiumiento; (yellow card) 44' Rikan; (yellow card) 70' Kecojević; 71' (3:1) Etoundi	Attendance: 32,042; Referee: (Switzerland) Sascha Amhof
Note: 72nd minute game interrupted for 10 minutes, because the referee no longer saw safety as being guaranteed (crowd problems)

18 April 2015 Round 28	Sion	0–1	Basel	Stade Tourbillon, Sion
17:45	Kouassi (yellow card) 34'; Zverotić (yellow card) 80'; Ziegler (yellow card) 86'	FCB summary	(yellow card) 28' Schär; 34' (0:1) Embolo; (yellow card) 68' Callà; (yellow card) 71' F. Frei; (yellow card) 73' Suchý; (yellow card) 81' González	Attendance: 12,500; Referee: (Switzerland) Alain Bieri (Solothurn)

26 April 2015 Round 29	Basel	1–2	Luzern	St. Jakob-Park, Basel
13:45	Suchý (yellow card) 25'; Delgado 37' (1:2)	FCB summary	1' (0:1) Lezcano; 32' (0:2) Schneuwly; (yellow card) 36' Thiesson; (yellow card) 83' Lustenberger	Attendance: 28,897; Referee: (Switzerland) Stephan Studer

29 April 2015 Round 30	Vaduz	1–3	Basel	Rheinpark Stadion, Vaduz
19:45	Muntwiler (yellow card) 34'; Sara (yellow card) 46'; Pak 66' (1:2)	FCB summary	30' (0:1) Streller; 45+1' (pen. 0:2) González; 82' (1:3) Zuffi	Attendance: 5,248; Referee: (Switzerland) Sascha Amhof

2 May 2015 Round 31	Basel	2–1	Grasshopper Club	St. Jakob-Park, Basel
20:00	Callà (yellow card) 34'; Elneny 55' (1:1); Callà 59' (1:2); Schär (yellow card) 90+2'	FCB summary	45+1' (0:1) Ravet; (yellow card) 65' Gülen	Attendance: 28,852; Referee: (Switzerland) Stephan Klossner

10 May 2015 Round 32	Zürich	1–2	Basel	Letzigrund, Zürich
16:00	Rikan (yellow card) 28'; Nef (yellow card) 77'; Kecojević 86' (1:1)	FCB summary	42' (0:1) Callà; 90+2' (1:2) Suchý	Attendance: 11,569; Referee: (Switzerland) Alain Bieri (Solothurn)

17 May 2015 Round 33	Basel	0–0	Young Boys	St. Jakob-Park, Basel
16:00	Xhaka (yellow card) 25'; Suchý (yellow card) 45'; Traoré (yellow card) 71'	FCB summary Scoresway summary	(yellow card) 15' Lecjaks; (yellow card) 37' von Bergen; (yellow card) 90+1' Vitkieviez	Attendance: 34,231; Referee: (Switzerland) Sascha Amhof

20 May 2015 Round 34	Aarau	2–1	Basel	Stadion Brügglifeld, Aarau
20:30	Mohamed Elneny 5' (o.g. 1:0); Djurić 49' (2:0); Burki (yellow card) 71'; Jaggy (yellow card) 89'	FCB summary Scoresway summary	(yellow card) 42' Ajeti; (yellow card) 61' Samuel; 62' (2:1) Embolo	Attendance: 4,551; Referee: (Austria) Robert Schörgenhofer

25 May 2015 Round 35	Thun	2–2	Basel	Arena Thun, Thun
16:00	Sadik 16' (1:0); Frontino (yellow card) 60'; Sadik 86' (2:2)	FCB summary (Soccerpunter report)	(yellow card) 67' Hamoudi; 73' (pen. 1:1) Gashi; 75' (1:2) Kakitani; (yellow card) 90' Huser	Attendance: 8,717; Referee: (Switzerland) Fedayi San

29 May 2015 Round 36	Basel	4–3	St. Gallen	St. Jakob-Park, Basel
20:30	Streller 17' (1:0); Samuel 49' (2:2); Schär (yellow card) 53'; Zuffi 78' (3:3); Samuel (yellow card) 85'; Al. Ajeti 87' (4:3)	FCB summary	30' (1:1) Mathys; 38' (1:2) Aleksić; (yellow card) 53' Aleksić; 54' (2:3) Aratore; (yellow card) 75' Tréand	Attendance: 33,403; Referee: (Switzerland) Stephan Studer

==== League table ====
Pos	Team	Pld	W	D	L	GF	GA	GD	Pts	Qualification or relegation
1	Basel (C)	36	24	6	6	84	41	+43	78	Qualification for the Champions League third qualifying round
2	Young Boys	36	19	9	8	64	45	+19	66	Qualification for the Champions League third qualifying round
3	Zürich	36	15	8	13	55	48	+7	53	Qualification for the Europa League third qualifying round
4	Thun	36	13	13	10	47	45	+2	52	Qualification for the Europa League second qualifying round
5	Luzern	36	12	11	13	54	46	+8	47	

Source: Swiss Super League
Rules for classification: 1) points; 2) goal difference; 3) number of goals scored
(C) Champions

===== Results summary =====
Overall								Home						Away					
Pld	W	D	L	GF	GA	GD	Pts	W	D	L	GF	GA	GD	W	D	L	GF	GA	GD
36	24	6	6	84	41	+43	78	12	4	2	43	15	+28	12	2	4	41	26	+15

Last updated: 29 May 2015.
Source: Fussballdaten.de

=== Swiss Cup ===
23 August 2014 Round 1	CS Italien (GE)	0–4	Basel	Stade des Arberes, Meyrin
17:00	Antonili (yellow card) 23'; Blanco (yellow card) 82'	FCB summary ASF/SFV summary	7' (0:1) Delgado; 30' (0:2) Embolo; 53' (0:3) F. Frei; 90+3' (0:4) Gashi	Attendance: 2,650 (sold out); Referee: (Switzerland) Nicolas Jancevski

20 September 2014 Round 2	Winterthur	0–4	Basel	Schützenwiese, Winterthur
14:00	Bengondo (yellow card) 15'; Iapichino (red card) 71'	FCB summary ASF/SFV summary	32' (0:1) (yellow card) 45' Elneny; 36' (0:2) Embolo; 41' (0:3) Embolo; (yellow card) 65' Díaz; 67' (0:4) Embolo	Attendance: 5,000 (sold out); Referee: (Switzerland) Stephan Studer

29 October 2014 Round 3	Wohlen	1–3	Basel	Stadion Niedermatten, Wohlen
19:30	Brahimi (yellow card) 61' (goal) 15' (1:1)	FCB summary ASF/SFV summary	11' (0:1) Kakitani; 41' (1:2) Sio; 90+1' (1:3) Embolo; (yellow card) 90+2' Embolo	Attendance: 4,100 (sold out); Referee: (Switzerland) Adrien Jaccottet (Basel)

4 March 2015 Quarterfinal	FC Münsingen	1–6	Basel	Sportanlage Sandreutenen, Münsingen
19:30	Max Dreier (yellow card) 37'; Antonius Dreier (yellow card) 40'; Christian Plüss 81' (1:6)	FCB summary ASF/SFV summary	6' (0:1) Hamoudi; 24' (0:2) Kakitani; 34' (0:3) Embolo; 41' (0:4) Delgado; 43' (0:5) Kakitani; 59' (0:6) Kakitani; (yellow card) 65' Samuel	Attendance: 4,000; Referee: (Switzerland) Alain Bieri (Solothurn)

8 April 2015 Semifinal	St. Gallen	1–3	FC Basel	AFG Arena, St. Gallen
20:15	Mutsch (yellow card) 34'; Dejan Janjatović (yellow card) 50'; Čavušević 87' (1:3); Stéphane Besle (yellow card) 89'; Everton Bilher (yellow card) 39' (yellow-red card) 90+2'	FCB summary ASF/SFV summary	14' (0:1) Gashi; (yellow card) 18' Embolo; 44' (o.g. 0:2) Mutsch; 60' (0:3) Gashi; (yellow card) 90+2' Callà	Attendance: 16,690; Referee: (Switzerland) Stephan Klossner

Final

7 June 2015
14:00

FC Basel	0 – 3	FC Sion
Gashi (yellow card) 46'; T. Xhaka (yellow card) 49'; F. Frei (yellow card) 64'	FCB summary ASF/SFV summary	18' (0:1) Konaté; 50' (0:2) Fernandes; 60' (0:3) Carlitos; (yellow card) 72' Zverotić

St. Jakob-Park, Basel
Attendance: 35,674 (sold out)
Referee: (Switzerland) Nikolaj Hänni

Note: Beginning of the second half with a 15 minute delay, because of the firing of pyrotechnics in the Sion fan sector.

GK	(Switzerland) Germano Vailati
DF	(Albania) Taulant Xhaka	(yellow card) 49'	(substituted off) 74'
DF	(Switzerland) Fabian Schär
DF	(Czech Republic) Marek Suchý
DF	(Ivory Coast) Adama Traoré
MF	(Switzerland) Fabian Frei	(yellow card) 65'
MF	(Albania) Shkëlzen Gashi	(yellow card) 46'
MF	(Egypt) Mohamed Elneny
MF	(Switzerland) Luca Zuffi
ST	(Switzerland) Davide Callà		(substituted off) 53'
ST	(Switzerland) Marco Streller (c)		(substituted off) 75'
Substitutes:
DF	(Egypt) Ahmed Hamoudi		(substituted on) 53'
MF	(Argentina) Matías Delgado		(substituted on) 74'
FW	(Switzerland) Albian Ajeti		(substituted on) 75'
Manager:
(Portugal) Paulo Sousa

GK	(Latvia) Andris Vaņins
DF	(Montenegro) Elsad Zverotić	(yellow card) 72'
DF	(Switzerland) Léo Lacroix
DF	(Switzerland) Reto Ziegler
DF	(The Gambia) Pa Modou Jagne
MF	(Portugal) Carlitos
MF	(Ivory Coast) Xavier Kouassi (c)
MF	(Switzerland) Vero Salatić
ST	(Switzerland) Edimilson Fernandes		(substituted off) 73'
ST	(Ghana) Ebenezer Assifuah		(substituted off) 75'
ST	(Senegal) Pape Moussa Konaté		(substituted off) 85'
Substitutes:
MF	(Switzerland) Michael Perrier		(substituted on) 73'
MF	(Switzerland) Daniel Follonier		(substituted on) 75'
MF	(Cyprus) Demetris Christofi		(substituted on) 85'
Manager:
(France) Didier Tholot

=== UEFA Champions League ===
==== Group stage ====
Pos	Team	Pld	W	D	L	GF	GA	GD	Pts	Qualification	RMA	BSL	LIV	LUD
1	(Spain) Real Madrid	6	6	0	0	16	2	+14	18	Advance to knockout phase	—	5–1	1–0	4–0
2	(Switzerland) Basel	6	2	1	3	7	8	−1	7	Advance to knockout phase	0–1	—	1–0	4–0
3	(England) Liverpool	6	1	2	3	5	9	−4	5	Transfer to Europa League	0–3	1–1	—	2–1
4	(Bulgaria) Ludogorets Razgrad	6	1	1	4	5	14	−9	4		1–2	1–0	2–2	—

Source: UEFA
Rules for classification: Group stage tiebreakers

16 September 2014 Round 1	Real Madrid (Spain)	5–1	(Switzerland) Basel	Santiago Bernabéu, Madrid
20:45	Suchý 14' (o.g. 0:1); Bale 30' (0:2); Ronaldo 31' (0:3); Rodríguez 37' (0:4); Benzema 79' (1:5); Pepe (yellow card) 85'	FCB summary UEFA report	38' (1:4) González; (yellow card) 55' Elneny; (yellow card) 60' Samuel; (yellow card) 90+1' Xhaka	Attendance: 65,364; Referee: Damir Skomina (Slovenia)

1 October 2014 Round 2	Basel (Switzerland)	1–0	(England) Liverpool	St. Jakob-Park, Basel
20:45	Streller 52' (1:0); Suchý (yellow card) 60'	FCB summary UEFA report	(yellow card) 9' Sterling; (yellow card) 54' Gerrard; (yellow card) 71' Balotelli	Attendance: 36,000 (sold out); Referee: Jonas Eriksson (Sweden)

22 October 2014 Round 3	Ludogorets Razgrad (Bulgaria)	1–0	(Switzerland) Basel	Vasil Levski National Stadium, Sofia
20:45	Minev (yellow card) 24'; Moți (yellow card) 86'; Minev 90+2' (1:0); Espinho (yellow card) 90+3'	FCB summary UEFA report	(red card) 18' Serey Die; (yellow card) 43' Xhaka; (yellow card) 45+2' González; (yellow card) 67' Embolo; (yellow card) 85' F. Frei (C); (yellow card) 90+3' Schär	Attendance: 29,150; Referee: Deniz Aytekin (Germany)

4 November 2014 Round 4	Basel (Switzerland)	4–0	(Bulgaria) Ludogorets Razgrad	St. Jakob-Park, Basel
20:45	Embolo 34' (1:0); González 41' (2:0); González (yellow card) 42'; Gashi 59' (3:0); Suchý 65' (4:0)	FCB summary UEFA report	(yellow card) 84' Marcelinho	Attendance: 35,272; Referee: Stéphane Lannoy (France)

26 November 2014 Round 5	Basel (Switzerland)	0–1	(Spain) Real Madrid	St. Jakob-Park, Basel
20:45	P. Degen (yellow card) 44'; Suchý (yellow card) 53'; Schär (yellow card) 80'	FCB summary UEFA report	35' (0:1) Ronaldo; (yellow card) 43' Sergio Ramos; (yellow card) 48' Coentrão	Attendance: 36,000 (sold out); Referee: Milorad Mažić (Serbia)

9 December 2014 Round 6	Liverpool (England)	1–1	(Switzerland) Basel	Anfield, Liverpool
20:45	Leiva (yellow card) 47'; Marković (red card) 60'; Lovren (yellow card) 66'; Moreno (yellow card) 77'; Gerrard 81' (1:1)	FCB summary UEFA report	25' (0:1) Frei; (yellow card) 80' Schär	Attendance: 43,290; Referee: Björn Kuipers (Netherlands)

Notes

1. Ludogorets Razgrad play their home matches at Vasil Levski National Stadium, Sofia instead of their regular stadium, Ludogorets Arena, Razgrad.

==== Round of 16 ====
The draw for the round of 16 was held on 15 December 2014. The first legs of the knockout phase were played on 17, 18, 24 and 25 February, and the second legs played on 10, 11, 17 and 18 March 2015.

18 February 2015 First leg	Basel (Switzerland)	1–1	(Portugal) Porto	St. Jakob-Park, Basel
20:45	González 11' (1:0); F. Frei (yellow card) 22'; Elneny (yellow card) 26'; Samuel (yellow card) 46'; Gashi (yellow card) 57'; Suchý (yellow card) 62'	FCB summary UEFA report	(yellow card) 29' Casemiro; (yellow card) 36' Torres; (yellow card) 51' Sandro; 79' (pen. 1:1) (yellow card) 87' Danilo	Attendance: 34,464; Referee: Mark Clattenburg (England)

10 March 2015 Second leg	Porto (Portugal)	4–0	(Switzerland) Basel	Estádio do Dragão, Porto
20:45	Brahimi 14' (1:0); Herrera 47' (2:0); Marcano (yellow card) 55'; Casemiro 56' (3:0); Aboubakar 76' (4:0)	FCB summary UEFA report	(yellow card) 30' Gashi; (yellow card) 38' González; (yellow card) 55' Safari; (yellow card) 49' (yellow-red card) 90+1' Samuel	Attendance: 43,108; Referee: Jonas Eriksson (Sweden)

Porto won 5–1 on aggregate.

== See also ==
- History of FC Basel
- List of FC Basel players
- List of FC Basel seasons

== Sources ==
- Rotblau: Jahrbuch Saison 2015/2016. Publisher: FC Basel Marketing AG. ISBN 978-3-7245-2050-4
- Rotblau: Jahrbuch Saison 2017/2018. Publisher: FC Basel Marketing AG. ISBN 978-3-7245-2189-1
- Die ersten 125 Jahre / 2018. Publisher: Josef Zindel im Friedrich Reinhardt Verlag, Basel. ISBN 978-3-7245-2305-5
- Season 2014–15 at "Basler Fussballarchiv” homepage
- Switzerland 2014–15 at RSSSF
