= Adama Traoré (footballer, born 1990) =

Ivorian footballer (born 1990)

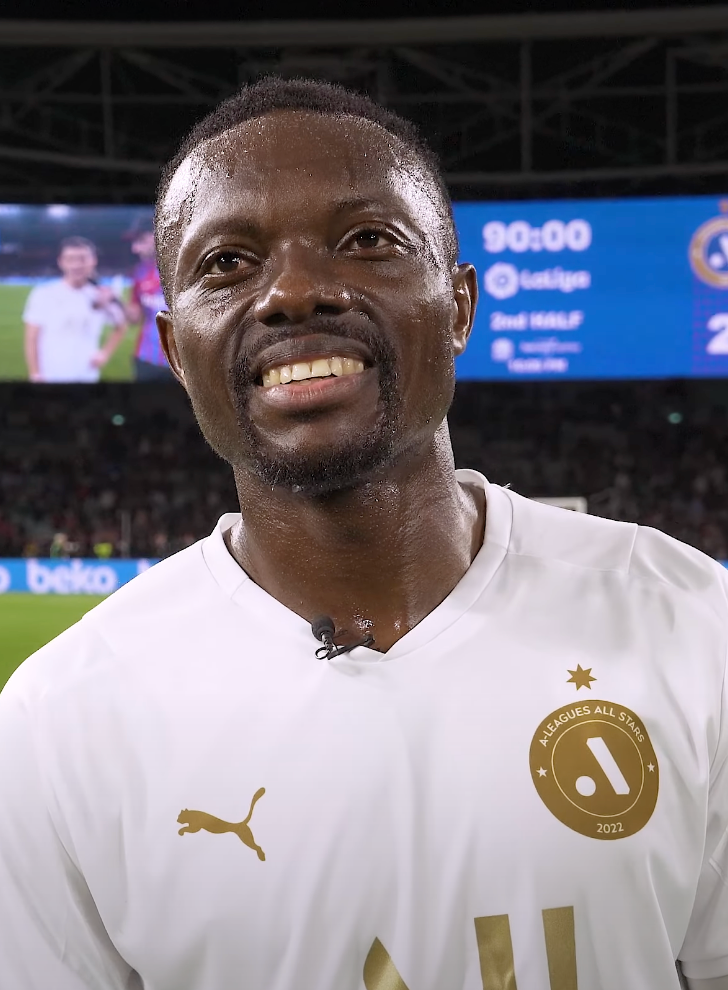
- Traoré with A-Leagues All Stars in 2022

Personal information
- Date of birth: 3 February 1990 (age 36)
- Place of birth: Bondoukou, Ivory Coast
- Height: 1.70 m (5 ft 7 in)
- Position: Left back

Team information
- Current team: Avondale FC
- Number: 21

Youth career
- 2002–2004: Celtic Football Academie
- 2005–2006: ÉF Yéo Martial

Senior career*
Years	Team	Apps	(Gls)
2006–2008	ÉF Yéo Martial		
2009–2012	Gold Coast United	69	(3)
2012–2014	Melbourne Victory	46	(1)
2014–2015	Vitória de Guimarães	15	(0)
2015–2017	Basel	59	(1)
2017–2019	Göztepe	27	(0)
2019–2021	Melbourne Victory	40	(0)
2021–2023	Western Sydney Wanderers	50	(0)
2023–2026	Melbourne Victory	39	(2)
2026–	Avondale FC		

International career^{‡}
2007	Ivory Coast U17	1	(0)
2006–2007	Ivory Coast U19	1	(0)
2007–2009	Ivory Coast U20	5	(1)
2015–2019	Ivory Coast	13	(0)
- * Club domestic league appearances and goals as of 16 Oct 2026 ‡ National team caps and goals as of 10 September 2019

Adama Traoré (Dyula: [à.dà.mà tɾa.o.re]; born 3 February 1990) is an Ivorian professional footballer who plays for A-League Men club Avondale FC as a left back.

== Club career ==
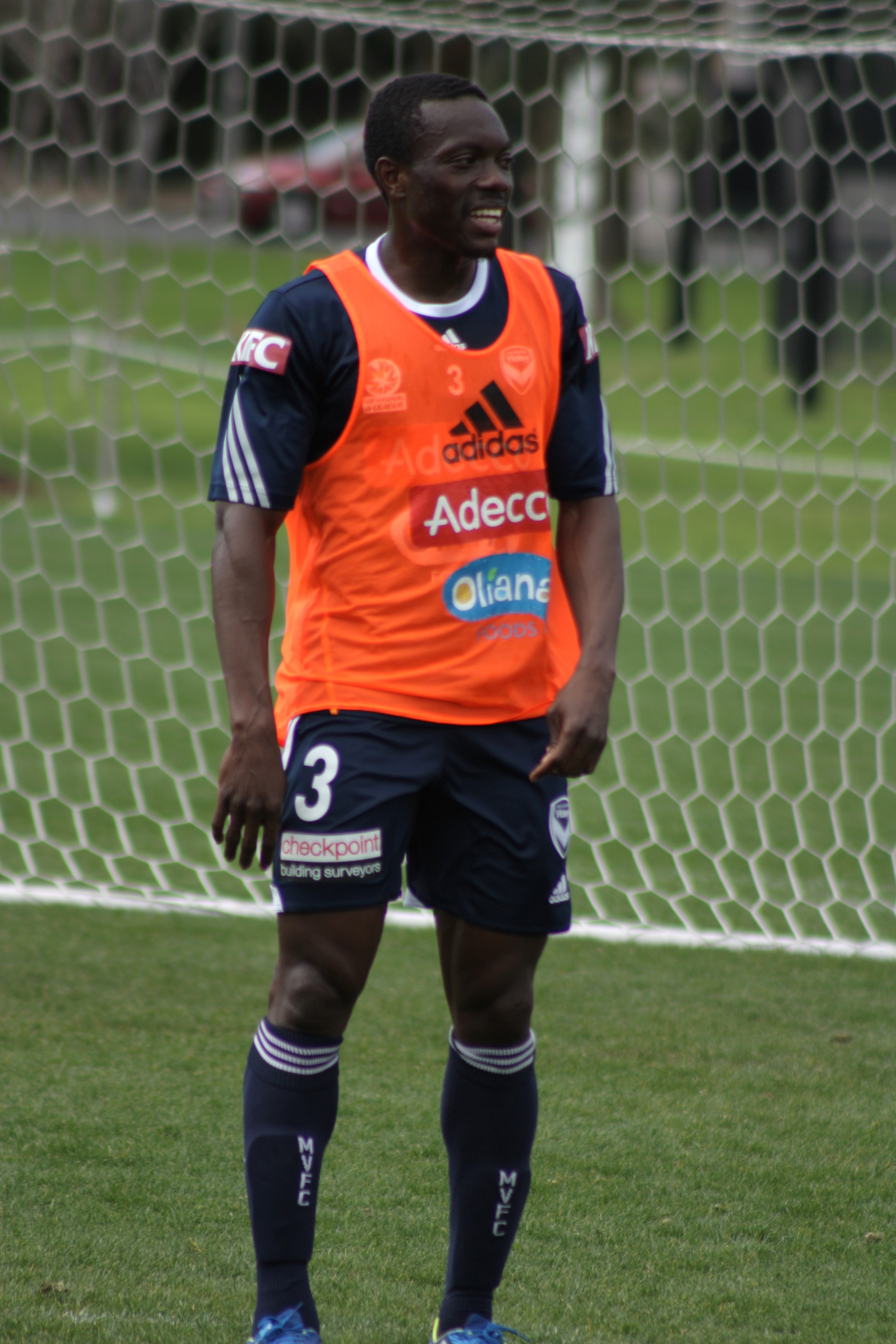
Adama Traoré training with Melbourne Victory FC in 2013.

=== First steps ===
Born in Bondoukou, Ivory Coast, Traoré began his career in his native Ivory Coast, where he played for Ecole de Football Yéo Martial. Traoré later signed a three-year contract with former A-League club Gold Coast United, after impressing in trial matches. Gold Coast United invited him for a trial after having watched highlights of his performances at the 2007 Toulon Tournament.

In 2010, Traore stated the move to the former A-League club Gold Coast United was a stepping stone in his ambitions of playing club football internationally. Due to Gold Coast United having its A-League license revoked, he had to leave the club.

=== Melbourne Victory ===
On 15 March 2012, it was announced that Traore had signed a two-year contract with A-League club Melbourne Victory. Traore made his debut for the Victory in their Round 1 clash with cross-town rivals Melbourne Heart, an encounter which the Victory lost 2–1. On 9 March 2013, Traore suffered a high grade, high ankle ligament rupture which sidelined him for the rest of the 2012–13 season.

After Clive Palmer's club collapsed Adama Traore signed with Melbourne Victory – and stated his desire to play for Australia's national team.

In May 2014, Traoré's contract with Melbourne expired after declining renewals in hopes of pursuit a career in Europe.

The most prestigious award given to a Melbourne Victory player, the Victory Medal, was awarded to Adama Traore at the end of season awards ceremony on 10 May 2014.

=== Vitória de Guimarães ===
On 14 June 2014, it was announced that Portuguese club Vitória de Guimarães had signed Traoré on a multi-year deal.

=== Basel ===
But after spending just six months in Portugal, Traoré joined FC Basel on 10 January 2015 signing a three-and-a-half-year contract. Traore joined Basel's first team for their 2014–15 season under head coach Paulo Sousa. After playing in two test games Traore played his domestic league debut for the club in the away game in the Stadion Wankdorf, in Bern, on 22 February 2015 as Basel were defeated 2–4 by Young Boys. The season 2014–15 was a very successful one for Basel. The championship was won for the sixth time in a row that season and in the 2014–15 Swiss Cup they reached the final, but finished as runners-up, losing 3–0 to FC Sion in the final. Basel entered the Champions League in the group stage and reached the knockout phase. But Basel then lost to Porto in the Round of 16. In the second half of the season Basel played 31 matches (18 Swiss League fixtures, 3 Swiss Cup, 2 Champions League and 8 test matches). Traoré totaled 17 appearances, 12 League, 2 Cup and 3 in test games.

In the club's 2015–16 season Urs Fischer was appointed as new head coach. Traore scored his first goal for his club in the home game in the St. Jakob-Park on 1 August 2015. It was the second goal of the game as Basel won 3–0 against Sion. Under trainer Fischer Traoré won the league championship at the end of the 2015–16 Super League season and at the end of the 2016–17 Super League season for the third time. For the club this was the eighth title in a row and their 20th championship title in total. They also won the Swiss Cup for the twelfth time, which meant they had won the double for the sixth time in the club's history.

Traoré left the club in August 2017. Between the years 2014 and 2017 he played a total of 95 games for Basel scoring a total of three goals. 59 of these games were in the Swiss Super League, seven in the Swiss Cup, ten in the UEFA competitions (Champions League and Europa League) and 19 were friendly games. He scored one goal in the domestic league, one in the cup and the other was scored during the test games.

=== Göztepe ===
Traoré joined Göztepe on 14 August 2017. In October 2018 he damaged knee ligaments and was ruled out for the rest of the season.

=== Melbourne Victory ===
On 12 September 2019, Traoré rejoined Melbourne Victory on a one-year contract. He was released on 11 June 2021.

== International career ==
Traoré has had spells with the Ivory Coast U-17, Ivory Coast U-19, and Ivory Coast U-20, playing a total of seven games for his country, scoring only one goal. He has played two games in the CAF-organised 2007 African Youth Championship (versus Congo and The Gambia) which doubled as a qualifier for the 2007 FIFA U-20 World Cup. During the same year, Traoré also participated in the Toulon Tournament and the UEMOA Tournament.

After arriving in Australia, Traoré stated that he would like to play for the Socceroos. However it later became clear that this was impossible as he had represented Ivory Coast at youth level. Under the regulations of FIFA, a player's national allegiance cannot change after they have represented their country of origin at national youth level unless the player held dual nationality upon their original call-up.

Traoré has also previously been selected for the senior national team to play against Senegal. However, having not yet played a game he has not received a full international cap, he turned down the opportunity to play this game as he had the ambition to play for the Socceroos.

Traore was called up by Ivory Coast for the first time on 7 November 2014 for their matches against Sierra Leone and Cameroon but did not play. He was again called up for the match on 6 September 2015 against Sierra Leone in the Adokiye Amiesimaka Stadium, Port Harcourt (Nigeria) for an Africa Cup of Nations qualification game. Traoré made his national team debut in the starting eleven but was substituted out after he injured himself. The match ended in a goalless draw.

A possibly unique situation occurred in a match in February 2022 in which Traoré played for an Australian invitational XI against a touring FC Barcelona side. Traoré scored for the Australian side, and his namesake Adama Traoré scored for Barcelona.

== Personal life ==
Growing up in Ivory Coast, Traoré said football was his passion and wanted to play the sport, even finishing school.

In March 2014, Traoré became an Australian citizen after staying in the country for five years. He stated that: "Australia has felt like home ever since my first few years in the Gold Coast."

== Career statistics ==
=== Club ===
As of match played 6 December 2020

Appearances and goals by club, season and competition
Club	Season	League			National cup		League cup		Continental		Other		Total	
Club	Season	Division	Apps	Goals	Apps	Goals	Apps	Goals	Apps	Goals	Apps	Goals	Apps	Goals
Gold Coast United	2009–10	A-League	11	0	–		–		–		0	0	11	0
Gold Coast United	2010–11	A-League	29	2	–		–		–		2	0	31	2
Gold Coast United	2011–12	A-League	27	1	–		–		–		0	0	27	1
Gold Coast United	Total		67	3	0	0	0	0	0	0	2	0	69	3
Melbourne Victory	2012–13	A-League	22	0	–		–		–		0	0	22	0
Melbourne Victory	2013–14	A-League	24	1	–		–		4	0	2	0	30	1
Melbourne Victory	Total		46	1	0	0	0	0	4	0	2	0	52	1
Vitória de Guimarães	2014–15	Primeira Liga	15	0	2	0	1	0	–		–		18	0
Vitória de Guimarães	Total		15		2		1		-		-		18	0
Basel	2014–15	Swiss Super League	11	0	2	0	–		0	0	–		13	0
Basel	2015–16	Swiss Super League	24	1	2	0	–		4	0	–		30	1
Basel	2016–17	Swiss Super League	23	0	3	1	–		6	0	–		32	1
Basel	Total		58	1	7	1	0	0	10	0	0	0	75	2
Göztepe	2017–18	Süper Lig	19	0	0	0	–		–		–		19	0
Göztepe	2018–19	Süper Lig	8	0	0	0	–		–		–		8	0
Göztepe	Total		27	0	0	0	0	0	0	0	0	0	27	0
Melbourne Victory	2019–20	A League	23	0	–		–		8	0	-		31	0
Melbourne Victory	2020–21	A League	17	0	0	0	–		4	0	-		21	0
Melbourne Victory	Total		40	0	0	0	0	0	12	0	0	0	52	0
Western Sydney Wanderers	2021-22	A League	23	0	1	0			-		-		24	0
Western Sydney Wanderers	2022-23	A League	26	0			-		-		-		26	0
Western Sydney Wanderers	Total		49	0	1	0	0	0	0	0	0	0	50	0
Melbourne Victory	2023-24	A League	23	1	-		-		-		-		23	1
Melbourne Victory	2024-25	A League	11	1	2	0	-		-		-		13	1
Melbourne Victory	2025-26	A League	0	0	0	0	0	0	0	0	0	0		
Melbourne Victory	Total		34	2	2	0	0	0	0	0	0	0	36	2
Career total			336	7	12	1	1	0	26	0	4	0	379	8

=== International ===
As of match played 10 September 2019

Appearances and goals by national team and year
National team	Year	Apps	Goals
Ivory Coast	2015	1	0
Ivory Coast	2016	4	0
Ivory Coast	2017	6	0
Ivory Coast	2018	1	0
Ivory Coast	2019	0	0
Total		12	0

== Honours ==
Basel

- Swiss Super League: 2014–15, 2015–16, 2016–17
- Swiss Cup: 2016–17; runner up: 2014–15

Ivory Coast

- UEMOA Tournament: 2007

Individual

- Melbourne Victory Player of the Season: 2013–14
- A-Leagues All Star: 2022
