= Tomáš Vaclík =

Czech footballer

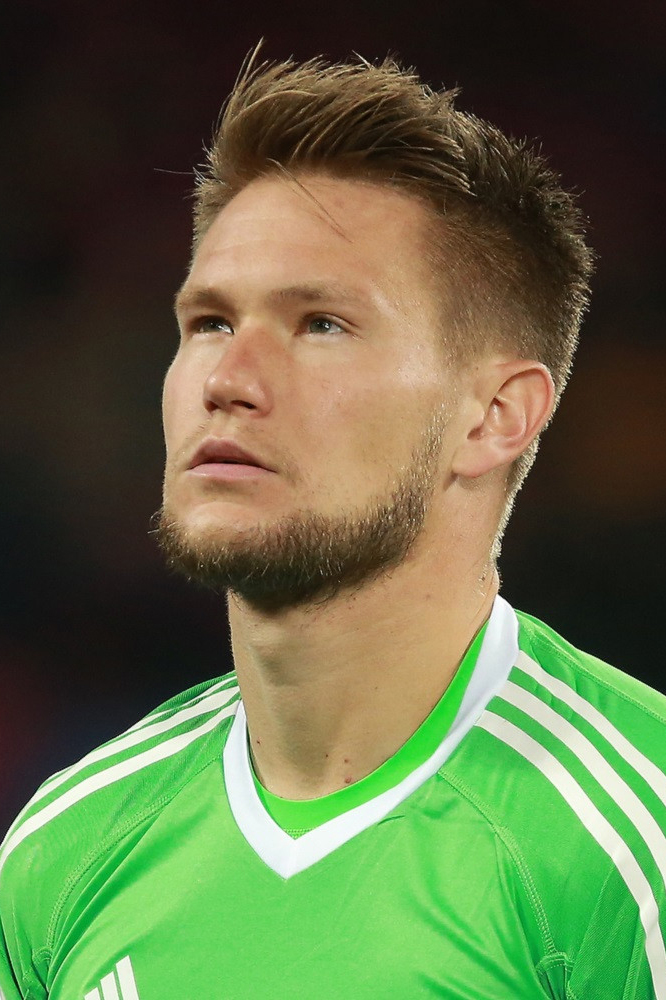
- Vaclík with Basel in 2017

Personal information
- Full name: Tomáš Vaclík
- Date of birth: 29 March 1989 (age 37)
- Place of birth: Ostrava, Czechoslovakia
- Height: 1.88 m (6 ft 2 in)
- Position: Goalkeeper

Youth career
- 2006–2007: Vítkovice

Senior career*
Years	Team	Apps	(Gls)
2007–2010	Vítkovice	52	(0)
2010–2012	Viktoria Žižkov	40	(0)
2012–2014	Sparta Prague	71	(0)
2014–2018	Basel	132	(0)
2018–2021	Sevilla	71	(0)
2021–2023	Olympiacos	37	(0)
2023	Huddersfield Town	13	(0)
2023–2024	New England Revolution	0	(0)
2024	Albacete	12	(0)
2025	Boavista	12	(0)

International career
2005	Czech Republic U16	1	(0)
2006–2007	Czech Republic U18	2	(0)
2007–2008	Czech Republic U19	8	(0)
2009	Czech Republic U20	4	(0)
2009–2011	Czech Republic U21	15	(0)
2012–2023	Czech Republic	54	(0)
- * Club domestic league appearances and goals as of 3 June 2025

Tomáš Vaclík (Czech pronunciation: [ˈtomaːʃ ˈvatsliːk]; born 29 March 1989) is a Czech professional footballer who plays as a goalkeeper.

Vaclík represented the Czech Republic at youth level, representing the under-21 side at the 2011 UEFA European Under-21 Championship and was named in that edition's Team of the Tournament. He made his senior debut for the Czech Republic national team in 2012 and was part of the side's squad at UEFA Euro 2016 and UEFA Euro 2020.

== Club career ==
=== Czech leagues ===
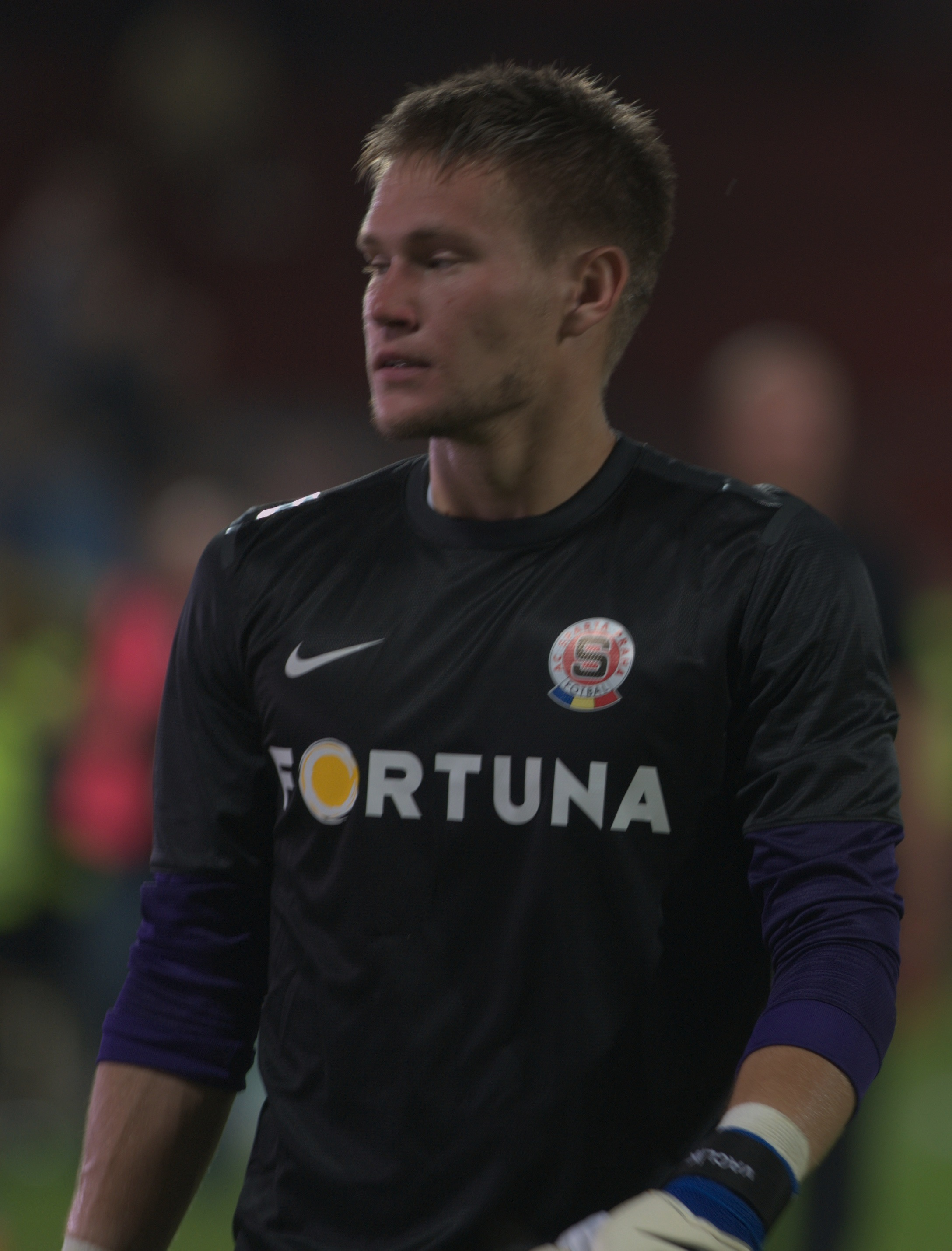
Vaclík with Sparta Prague in 2012

Vaclík started out with FC Vítkovice in the Czech 2. Liga where he played for three seasons before transferring to Viktoria Žižkov. Žižkov won promotion to the Czech First League in Vaclík's first season with the club. In July 2011, Vaclík signed a three-year contract with De Graafschap but it was later announced that he had failed a medical in the Netherlands and would be returning to Prague.

Vaclík played for Žižkov during the first half of the 2011–12 Czech First League. In January 2012, with Žižkov bottom of the league with seven points from 16 matches, Vaclík transferred to Sparta Prague for a reported fee of 8.25 million CZK, signing a contract to keep him at the club until the summer of 2016.

=== Basel ===
On 22 May 2014 it was announced that Vaclík had signed for FC Basel of the Swiss Super League on a four-year contract with an option for another year. He joined the team for their 2014–15 season under head coach Paulo Sousa. After playing in four test games Vaclik played his domestic league debut for the club in the away game in the Stadion Brügglifeld on 19 July 2014 as Basel won 2–1 against Aarau. Basel entered the Champions League in the group stage. They reached the knockout phase on 9 December 2014, as they managed a 1–1 draw at Anfield against Liverpool. But they were knocked out of the competition by Porto in the round of 16. At the end of the 2014–15 season, Basel won the championship for the sixth time in a row. In the 2014–15 Swiss Cup Basel reached the final. However, for the third time in a row they finished as runners-up. Basel played a total of 65 matches (36 Swiss League fixtures, 6 Swiss Cup, 8 Champions League and 15 test matches). Under manager Paulo Sousa Vaclík totaled 51 appearances, 33 in the League, 8 in the Champions League as well 10 in test games.

At the end of the 2015–16 Super League season, under new head coach Urs Fischer, Vaclík won the championship for the second time. Vaclík then extended his contract with the club, this was then dated up until the end of June 2021.

At the end of Basel's 2016–17 season, Vaclík won the championship with the club for the third time. For the club this was the eighth title in a row and their 20th championship title in total. They also won the 2016–17 Swiss Cup, defeating Sion 3–0 in the final, which meant they had won the double.

On 4 July 2018, Basel announced that Vaclík had signed for Sevilla FC. In his four seasons as their first goalkeeper, Vaclík played a total of 195 games for Basel. 132 of these games were in the Swiss Super League, four in the Swiss Cup, 33 in the UEFA competitions (Champions League and Europa League) and 26 were friendly games. He had won the championship three times and the Swiss Cup once.

=== Sevilla ===
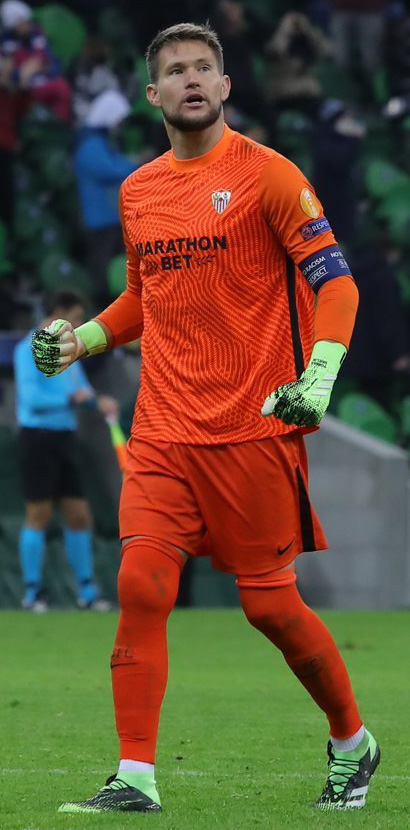
Vaclík playing for Sevilla in 2020

On 9 July 2018, Vaclík signed for Spanish La Liga club Sevilla. In May 2021, he confirmed that he would leave the club at the end of the season on his Facebook page.

=== Olympiacos ===
On 13 July 2021, Vaclík signed a two-year contract with Olympiacos of the Super League Greece following his departure from Sevilla. He was signed to replace José Sá, who moved to English club Wolverhampton Wanderers.

=== Later career ===
In January 2023, Vaclík signed a short-term contract with EFL Championship side Huddersfield Town until the end of the 2022–23 season, playing 13 games as the club managed to avoid relegation that season. On 26 August 2023, Vaclík signed a contract with Major League Soccer club New England Revolution through the 2024 season, with a club option for 2025, pending receipt of his P-1 visa, although he never played a competitive game for the club, who released him in January 2024. On 13 February 2024, he joined Albacete in Spain until the end of the 2023–24 season.

On 12 February 2025, Vaclík signed a contract with Portuguese Primeira Liga club Boavista until the end of the season, with the club recently having replaced their manager. Vaclík was one of nine players signed by bottom-of-the-table Boavista on the same day, after the expiration of a transfer ban. He made his debut on 22 February in a 3–0 loss to Benfica.

== International career ==
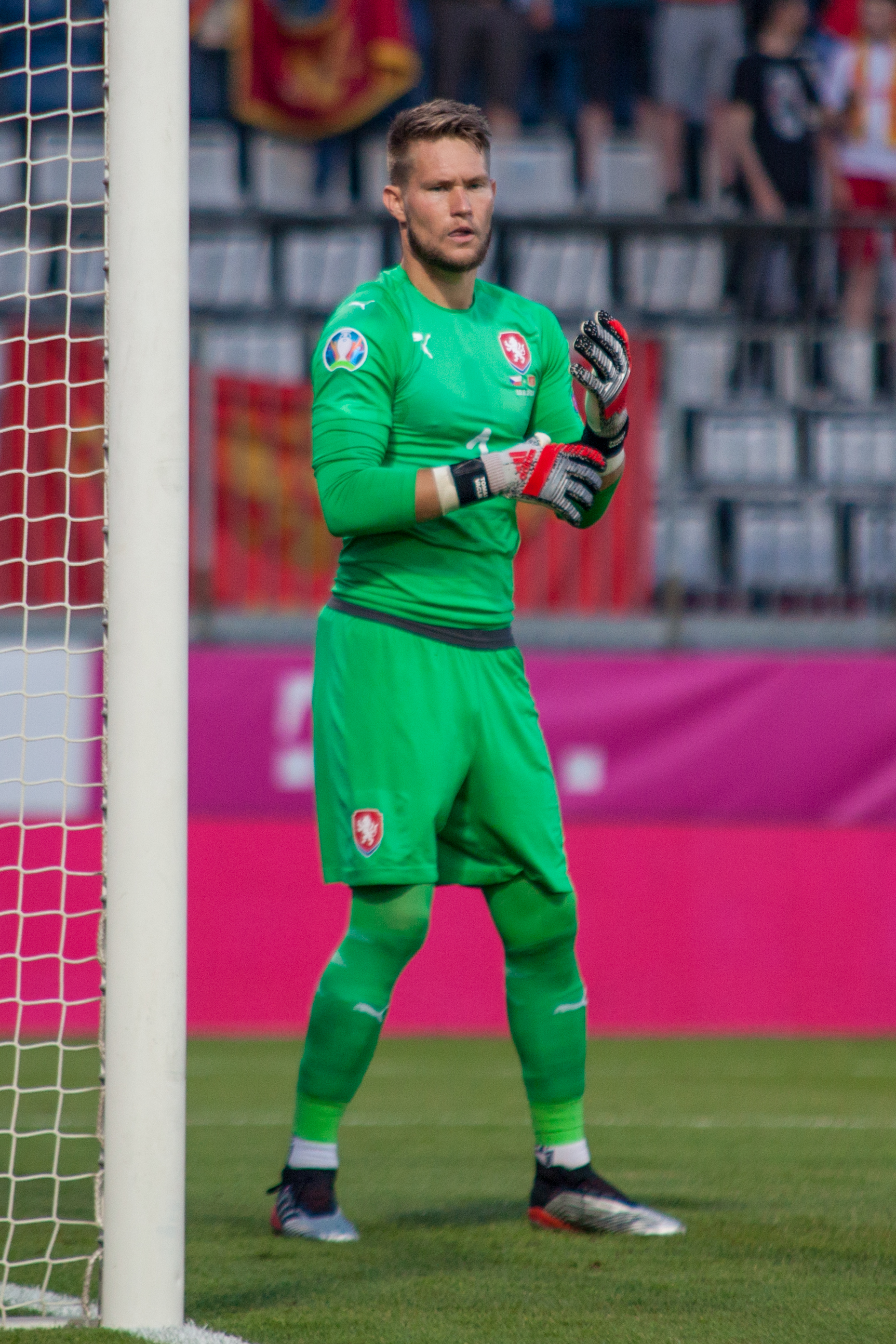
Vaclík with the national team in 2019

Vaclík represented the Czech Republic at youth level between 2005 and 2011, progressing from the under-16 until under-21 team. Vaclík was involved in the national team for the first time in 2011, selected as a reserve goalkeeper for the side's matches against Spain and Luxembourg, although he did not play. He made his debut for the Czech senior side on 14 November 2012 in a 3–0 friendly victory against Slovakia. He played six times from the first 37 times he was included in the squad, limited mainly due to the presence of first-choice keeper Petr Čech. He made his 50th appearance for the Czech Republic in a UEFA Nations League game against Switzerland in June 2022.

== Career statistics ==
=== Club ===
As of match played 17 May 2025

Appearances and goals by club, season and competition
Club	Season	League			National Cup (Note: Includes Czech Cup, Swiss Cup and Copa del Rey)		Continental		Other		Total	
Club	Season	Division	Apps	Goals	Apps	Goals	Apps	Goals	Apps	Goals	Apps	Goals
Vítkovice	2006–07	Czech 2. Liga	3	0			—		—		3	0
Vítkovice	2007–08	Czech 2. Liga	16	0			—		—		16	0
Vítkovice	2008–09	Czech 2. Liga	14	0			—		—		14	0
Vítkovice	2009–10	Czech 2. Liga	19	0			—		—		19	0
Vítkovice	Total		52	0			—		—		52	0
Viktoria Žižkov	2010–11	Czech 2. Liga	24	0	2	0	—		—		26	0
Viktoria Žižkov	2011–12	Czech First League	16	0	2	0	—		—		18	0
Viktoria Žižkov	Total		40	0	4	0	—		—		44	0
Sparta Prague	2011–12	Czech First League	11	0	5	0	—		—		16	0
Sparta Prague	2012–13	Czech First League	30	0	0	0	11 (Note: Appearance(s) in UEFA Europa League)	0	—		41	0
Sparta Prague	2013–14	Czech First League	30	0	5	0	2	0	—		37	0
Sparta Prague	Total		71	0	10	0	13	0	—		94	0
Basel	2014–15	Swiss Super League	32	0	0	0	8 (Note: Appearance(s) in UEFA Champions League)	0	—		40	0
Basel	2015–16	Swiss Super League	30	0	0	0	11 (Note: Four appearances in UEFA Champions League, seven appearances in UEFA Europa League)	0	—		41	0
Basel	2016–17	Swiss Super League	34	0	3	0	6	0	—		43	0
Basel	2017–18	Swiss Super League	36	0	1	0	8	0	—		45	0
Basel	Total		132	0	4	0	33	0	—		169	0
Sevilla	2018–19	La Liga	33	0	0	0	15	0	1 (Note: Appearance(s) in Supercopa de España)	0	49	0
Sevilla	2019–20	La Liga	33	0	2	0	2	0	—		37	0
Sevilla	2020–21	La Liga	5	0	1	0	2	0	0	0	8	0
Sevilla	Total		71	0	3	0	19	0	1	0	94	0
Olympiacos	2021–22	Super League Greece	32	0	2	0	10	0	—		44	0
Olympiacos	2022–23	Super League Greece	5	0	0	0	8	0	—		13	0
Olympiacos	Total		37	0	2	0	18	0	—		57	0
Huddersfield Town	2022–23	Championship	13	0	0	0	—		—		13	0
New England Revolution	2023	Major League Soccer	0	0	0	0	—		—		0	0
Albacete	2023–24	Segunda División	12	0	—		—		—		12	0
Boavista	2024–25	Primeira Liga	12	0	—		—		—		12	0
Career total			440	0	23	0	83	0	1	0	547	0

=== International ===
Appearances and goals by national team and year
National team	Year	Apps	Goals
Czech Republic	2012	1	0
Czech Republic	2013	0	0
Czech Republic	2014	1	0
Czech Republic	2015	3	0
Czech Republic	2016	6	0
Czech Republic	2017	7	0
Czech Republic	2018	5	0
Czech Republic	2019	6	0
Czech Republic	2020	5	0
Czech Republic	2021	13	0
Czech Republic	2022	6	0
Czech Republic	2023	1	0
Total		54	0

== Honours ==
Sparta Prague

- Czech First League: 2013–14

Basel

- Swiss Super League: 2014–15, 2015–16, 2016–17
- Swiss Cup: 2016–17; runner up: 2014–15

Sevilla

- UEFA Europa League: 2019–20

Olympiacos

- Super League Greece: 2021–22

Czech Republic U21

- UEFA European Under-21 Championship bronze: 2011

Czech Republic

- China Cup bronze: 2018

Individual

- UEFA European Under-21 Championship Team of the Tournament: 2011
- Swiss Super League Team of the Year: 2014–15 2015–16, 2016–17, 2017–18,
- La Liga Player of the Month: November 2018,
- Czech Footballer of the Year: 2018,
- Golden Ball (Czech Republic): 2019,
- Super League Greece Player of the Month: January 2022
