= Ahmed Hamoudi =

Egyptian footballer (born 1990)

Personal information
- Full name: Ahmed Mohamed Bekhit Abd El Gaber Hamoudi
- Date of birth: 30 July 1990 (age 36)
- Place of birth: Alexandria, Egypt.
- Height: 1.73 m (5 ft 8 in)
- Positions: Attacking midfielder; winger

Team information
- Current team: Pyramids

Youth career
- –2010: Smouha

Senior career*
Years	Team	Apps	(Gls)
2010–2014	Smouha	60	(9)
2014–2016	FC Basel	12	(1)
2015–2016	→ Zamalek (Loan)	15	(1)
2016–2017	Al Batin	8	(1)
2017–2019	Al Ahly	19	(2)
2019–2021	Pyramids	1	(0)
2021-22	Al-Masry SC	20	(2)
2022-	Aswan SC	14	(0)

International career
2013–2014	Egypt	11	(1)
- * Club domestic league appearances and goals as of 22 August 2025

Ahmed Hamoudi (Arabic: أحمد حمودي; born 30 July 1990) is an Egyptian footballer who plays as an attacking midfielder for Egyptian Premier League club Pyramids.

== Club career ==
=== Smouha ===
Hamoudi played his youth football with Smouha Sporting Club and advanced to their first team in 2010. In his first season he played regularly. Following the Port Said Stadium riot on 1 February 2012, the Egyptian Premier League was suspended, and on 10 March 2012, the Egyptian Football Association announced their decision to cancel the remainder of the season. The following season play restarted, however, after the 2013 Egyptian coup d'état on 3 July 2013, the Egyptian season was suspended for security reasons, and a decision was reached to cancel the remainder of the season. The next season was again played in full and Hamoudi with Smouha were runners-up in the championship.

=== Basel ===
On 29 July 2014 Basel announced that they had signed Hamoudi on a four-year contract. He joined Basel's first team for their 2014–15 season under head coach Paulo Sousa. After playing in one test game, Hamoudi played his debut played for his new club in the Swiss Cup away game on 23 August 2014 as Basel won 4–0 against CS Italien (GE). He played his domestic league debut and scored his first league goal in the home game in St. Jakob-Park on 23 September 2014. It was the last goal of the match and the pass came from his Egyptian teammate Mohamed Elneny, as Basel won 3–1 against Vaduz.

The season 2014–15 was a successful one for Basel. Basel entered the Champions League in the group stage. They reached the knockout phase on 9 December 2014, as they managed a 1–1 draw at Anfield against Liverpool. But they were knocked out of the competition by Porto in the round of 16. At the end of the 2014–15 season, Basel won the championship for the sixth time in a row. In the 2014–15 Swiss Cup Basel reached the final. However, for the third time in a row they finished as runners-up.

However, Hamoudi failed to make a lasting impression during that season under trainer Paulo Sousa. Of the 50 competition matches (36 Swiss League fixtures – 6 Swiss Cup and 8 Champions League) that Basel played that season, Hamoudi appeared in just 20 and he was mainly used as a substitute. So for the next season Hamoudi was loaned out to Zamalek. Somewhat more than a year later, on 31 August, Basel announced that the contract between them and the 26-year-old Egyptian international Hamoudi had been resolved on mutual consent with immediate effect. During his season with the club, Hamoudy played a total of 28 games for Basel scoring a total of three goals. Twelve of these games were in the Swiss Super League, four in the Swiss Cup, four in the 2014–15 Champions League and four were friendly games. He scored one goal in the domestic league, one in the cup and the other was scored during the test games.

=== Zamalek ===
On Sunday 5 August 2015 Hamoudi joined Zamalek on loan until the end of the 2015–16 season, he made his debut on 23 August 2015 and scored twice in the 3–1 away win against CS Sfaxien in the fifth round of the 2015 CAF Confederation Cup group stage.

=== Al Ahly ===
On 30 January 2017, Hamoudi joined Al Ahly from Al Batin.

== Career statistics ==
=== International ===
Appearances and goals by national team and year
National team	Year	Apps	Goals
Egypt	2013	6	1
Egypt	2014	5	0
Total		11	1

Scores and results list Egypt's goal tally first, score column indicates score after each Hamoudi goal.

List of international goals scored by Ahmed Hamoudi
No.	Date	Venue	Opponent	Score	Result	Competition
1	22 March 2013	Borg El Arab Stadium, Alexandria, Egypt	Swaziland	6–0	10–0	Friendly

== Honors ==
=== Club ===
Basel

- Swiss Super League: 2014–15
- Swiss Cup runner up: 2014–15

Zamalek SC

- Egypt Cup: 2014–15

Al Ahly

- Egyptian Premier League: 2016–17, 2017–18, 2018–19
- Egypt Cup: 2017
- Egyptian Super Cup: 2017

=== Individual ===
- Egypt Cup Top Goalscorer: 2014 (6 goals)
