= Robin Huser =

Swiss footballer (born 1998)

Personal information
- Full name: Robin Marc Huser
- Date of birth: 24 January 1998 (age 28)
- Place of birth: Recherswil, Canton of Solothurn, Switzerland
- Height: 1.80 m (5 ft 11 in)
- Position: Midfielder

Youth career
- –2010: FC Subingen
- 2010–2012: FC Solothurn
- 2012–2015: Basel

Senior career*
Years	Team	Apps	(Gls)
2015–2019	Basel	2	(0)
2017–2018	→ Winterthur (loan)	22	(2)
2018	→ Thun (loan)	5	(0)
2019–2020	Chiasso	31	(0)
2021–2022	Solothurn	27	(0)

International career
2012–2013	Switzerland U-15	8	(0)
2013	Switzerland U-16	4	(1)
2014–2015	Switzerland U-17	14	(1)
2015–2016	Switzerland U-18	6	(1)
2016	Switzerland U-19	1	(0)
2017–2018	Switzerland U-20	8	(0)
- * Club domestic league appearances and goals as of 28 May 2022

Robin Huser (born 24 January 1998, in Recherswil) is a Swiss professional footballer who plays as a midfielder.

== Club career ==
Huser started his youth football with local club FC Subingen. In 2010 he moved to the youth of FC Solothurn and another two years later he moved to the youth division of FC Basel. In the summer of 2014 he advanced to their U-21 team, who played in the Promotion League, the third tier of Swiss football.

During their 2014–15 season under head coach Paulo Sousa, Huser also advanced to Basel's first team and appeared in 12 test games. Towards the end of the season he played his domestic league debut for the club in the away game in the Stadion Brügglifeld on 20 May 2015 as Basel were defeated 1–2 by Aarau. At the end of the 2014–15 Super League season Basel won the Swiss championship.

During the following season Huser played mainly with the U-21 team. Under Basel's new head coach Urs Fischer the team won the championship at the end of the 2015–16 Super League season. However, Huser had appeared in just two Swiss Cup games and in one match in the 2015–16 UEFA Europa League. In May 2016 Huser injured himself in training: a one-on-one situation, the striker with his back to him. As he intended to follow the attacker's pace, he slipped into a hole and damaged his left knee. Eight months forced break. The year 2016 was over for him from a sporting point of view.

Basel announced, on 12 June 2017, that Huser would be loaned out to Winterthur, who at that time played in the Challenge League, the second tier of Swiss football. Huser played regularly for the team and in 22 games he scored two goals.

on 28 March 2018 Basel announced that Huser was loaned to Thun until the end of the season. Huser had five appearances for Thun in the Super League. But the loan was not satisfactory, so the player refused an extension of the contract.

The following season Huser returned to Basel because his contract was still valid, but again playing mainly for the U-21 team. Under trainer Marcel Koller Basel won the Swiss Cup in the 2018–19 season. In the first round Basel beat Montlingen 3–0 and Huser had an appearance in this match. In the second round Echallens Région 7–2 and in the round of 16 Winterthur 1–0. In the quarter-finals Sion were defeated 4–2 after extra time and in the semi-finals Zürich were defeated 3–1. All these games were played away from home. The final was held on the 19 May 2019 in the Stade de Suisse Wankdorf Bern against Thun. Striker Albian Ajeti scored the first goal, Fabian Frei the second for Basel, then Dejan Sorgić netted a goal for Thun, but the result was 2–1 for Basel.

At the end of the 2018–19 season Huser contract expired and he left the club. During his time with the club, Huser played a total of 24 games for Basel scoring one goal. Two of these games were in the Swiss Super League, one in the Swiss Cup, one was in the Europa League and 18 were friendly games. He scored his goal during the test games.

Huser joined Chiasso in the summer of 2019 signing a more-year contract. He played regularly with the team in the Challenge League, but following a number of changes in the coaching staff the situation changed. In October 2020 he dissolved the contract, which would have run until the summer and ended his professional playing career.

At the beginning of the year 2021 Huser joined amateur club FC Solothurn playing in the fourth tier of Swiss football. At the same time he started his internship with Hyll AG in Stettlen and advanced to becoming Content & Marketing Manager.

== International career ==
Huser played various international games for the Swiss U-16, U-17 and U-18 teams. He played his debut for the Swiss U-19 national team on 15 March 2016 as they won 2–0 away against the Liechtenstein U-19 team.

== Honours ==
Basel

- Swiss Super League: 2014–15, 2015–16, 2016–17
- Swiss Cup winner: 2016–17, 2018–19
