= Yoichiro Kakitani =

Japanese footballer (born 1990)

Yoichiro Kakitani 柿谷 曜一朗
Personal information
- Date of birth: 3 January 1990 (age 36)
- Place of birth: Osaka, Japan
- Height: 1.76 m (5 ft 9 in)
- Positions: Forward; attacking midfielder

Youth career
- 1994–2005: Cerezo Osaka

Senior career*
| Years | Team | Apps | (Gls) |
| 2006–2014 | Cerezo Osaka | 129 | (37) |
| 2009–2011 | → Tokushima Vortis (loan) | 97 | (14) |
| 2014–2015 | FC Basel | 18 | (4) |
| 2016–2021 | Cerezo Osaka | 124 | (20) |
| 2021–2022 | Nagoya Grampus | 57 | (5) |
| 2023–2024 | Tokushima Vortis | 29 | (0) |

International career^{‡}
| 2005–2007 | Japan U17 | 9 | (6) |
| 2007–2009 | Japan U20 | 8 | (3) |
| 2013–2014 | Japan | 18 | (5) |
Medal record
Cerezo Osaka
| Winner | J.League Cup | 2017 |
| Winner | Emperor's Cup | 2017 |
Representing Japan
AFC U-16 Championship
| Gold medal – first place | 2006 Singapore |
- * Club domestic league appearances and goals as of 5 January 2023, 21:23 (UTC) ‡ National team caps and goals as of 14 October 2014

Yoichiro Kakitani (柿谷 曜一朗, Kakitani Yōichirō) (born 3 January 1990) is a Japanese former professional footballer who played as a forward or an attacking midfielder.

== Club career ==
=== Cerezo Osaka ===
Born in Osaka, Kakitani joined Cerezo Osaka's youth team at the age of 4. In 2006, he signed his first professional contract with Cerezo at 16 – the club record for the youngest player signed to a professional contract. He played his first J-League game on 26 November 2006. He also trained with the Arsenal F.C. and Inter Milan youth teams.

Kakitani entered the e-School of Human Sciences, Waseda University in 2008. Kakitani was loaned to Tokushima Vortis on 18 June 2009 and returned to Cerezo Osaka in 2012.

=== Basel ===
On 7 July 2014 FC Basel announced that they had signed Kakitani on a four-year contract. Kakitani joined Basel to the start of the 2014–15 Swiss Super League season. He joined the team on 17 July for their 2014–15 season under head coach Paulo Sousa. Kakitani played his domestic league debut for the club in the away game in the Stockhorn Arena on 2 August, coming on as a substitute for Mohamed Elneny as Basel won 3–2 against Thun. He scored his first goal for his new club one week later, on 9 August, in the home game in the St. Jakob-Park as Basel won 4–1 against Zürich. The season 2014–15 was a successful one for Basel. Basel entered the Champions League in the group stage. They reached the knockout phase on 9 December 2014, as they managed a 1–1 draw at Anfield against Liverpool. But they were knocked out of the competition by Porto in the round of 16. At the end of the 2014–15 season, Basel won the championship for the sixth time in a row. In the 2014–15 Swiss Cup Basel reached the final. However for the third time in a row they finished as runners-up. However, Kakitani failed to make a lasting impression in this season under trainer Paulo Sousa. Of the 50 competition matches (36 Swiss League fixtures – 6 Swiss Cup and 8 Champions League) that Basel played that season, Kakitani appeared in just 28.

In their following season new head coach was Urs Fischer and under him Kakitani played only in seven games. Being unhappy, he decided to return to Japan. During his 18 months with the club, Kakitani played a total of 41 games for Basel scoring a total of 14 goals. 18 of these games were in the Swiss Super League, six in the Swiss Cup, three in the 2014–15 Champions League and 14 were friendly games. He scored four goals in the domestic league, four in the cup and the other six were scored during the test games.

=== Return to Cerezo Osaka ===
Unable to establish himself at Basel in the first half of the 2015–2016 season, Kakitani left the club in early January 2016 returning to his home club Cerezo Osaka which had been relegated to the J2 League during his absence. The team has been playing in the J1 League since the 2017 season.

=== Return to Tokushima Vortis ===
On 6 January 2023, Kakitani announcement officially return to former club, Tokushima Vortis for upcoming 2023 season, he played for the club on loan in the middle of the 2009 season.

== International career ==
He was named Most Valuable Player in the AFC U-17 Championship 2006 after helping Japan win the tournament, scoring 4 goals.

Kakitani scored two goals at 2007 FIFA U-17 World Cup in South Korea. Against France he scored a spectacular goal from the halfway line.

Kakitani debuted for the Japan senior team at the 2013 EAFF East Asian Cup. He played his first international match against China, scoring his first international goal in the 59th minute. He then scored twice against South Korea in a 2–1 win. His three goals from three matches made him top goalscorer as Japan won the tournament.

== Career statistics ==
=== Club ===
As of the start from 3 of November 2023.

Appearances and goals by club, season and competition
| Club | Season | League | | | Emperor's Cup | | J. League Cup | | Continental | | Total | |
| Club | Season | Division | Apps | Goals | Apps | Goals | Apps | Goals | Apps | Goals | Apps | Goals |
|---|---|---|---|---|---|---|---|---|---|---|---|---|
| Cerezo Osaka | 2006 | J1 League | 1 | 0 | 0 | 0 | 0 | 0 | 0 | 0 | 1 | 0 |
| Cerezo Osaka | 2007 | J2 League | 21 | 2 | 1 | 0 | – | | 0 | 0 | 22 | 2 |
| Cerezo Osaka | 2008 | J2 League | 24 | 0 | 0 | 0 | – | | 0 | 0 | 24 | 0 |
| Cerezo Osaka | 2009 | J2 League | 6 | 2 | – | | – | | 0 | 0 | 6 | 2 |
| Cerezo Osaka | Total | | 52 | 4 | 1 | 0 | 0 | 0 | 0 | 0 | 53 | 4 |
| Tokushima Vortis | 2009 | J2 League | 27 | 4 | 1 | 0 | – | | 0 | 0 | 28 | 4 |
| Tokushima Vortis | 2010 | J2 League | 34 | 4 | 2 | 0 | – | | 0 | 0 | 36 | 4 |
| Tokushima Vortis | 2011 | J2 League | 36 | 6 | 1 | 0 | – | | 0 | 0 | 37 | 6 |
| Tokushima Vortis | Total | | 97 | 14 | 4 | 0 | – | | 0 | 0 | 101 | 14 |
| Cerezo Osaka | 2012 | J1 League | 30 | 11 | 3 | 1 | 7 | 5 | 0 | 0 | 40 | 17 |
| Cerezo Osaka | 2013 | J1 League | 34 | 21 | 0 | 0 | 8 | 3 | 0 | 0 | 42 | 24 |
| Cerezo Osaka | 2014 | J1 League | 14 | 1 | 0 | 0 | 0 | 0 | 8 | 4 | 22 | 5 |
| Cerezo Osaka | Total | | 78 | 33 | 3 | 1 | 15 | 8 | 8 | 4 | 104 | 46 |
| FC Basel | 2014–15 | Swiss Super League | 14 | 3 | 3 | 4 | – | | 3 | 0 | 20 | 7 |
| FC Basel | 2015–16 | Swiss Super League | 4 | 1 | 2 | 0 | – | | 0 | 0 | 6 | 1 |
| FC Basel | Total | | 18 | 4 | 5 | 4 | – | | 3 | 0 | 26 | 8 |
| Cerezo Osaka | 2016 | J2 League | 22 | 6 | 0 | 0 | 0 | 0 | 0 | 0 | 22 | 6 |
| Cerezo Osaka | 2017 | J1 League | 34 | 6 | 5 | 1 | 1 | 1 | 0 | 0 | 40 | 8 |
| Cerezo Osaka | 2018 | J1 League | 21 | 4 | 0 | 0 | 2 | 0 | 3 | 1 | 26 | 5 |
| Cerezo Osaka | 2019 | J1 League | 23 | 3 | 1 | 1 | 4 | 0 | 0 | 0 | 28 | 4 |
| Cerezo Osaka | 2020 | J1 League | 24 | 1 | 0 | 0 | 4 | 1 | 0 | 0 | 28 | 2 |
| Cerezo Osaka | Total | | 124 | 20 | 6 | 2 | 11 | 2 | 3 | 1 | 144 | 25 |
| Nagoya Grampus | 2021 | J1 League | 36 | 5 | 4 | 0 | 5 | 2 | 7 | 2 | 52 | 9 |
| Nagoya Grampus | 2022 | J1 League | 21 | 0 | 2 | 0 | 6 | 1 | – | | 29 | 1 |
| Nagoya Grampus | Total | | 57 | 5 | 6 | 0 | 11 | 3 | 7 | 2 | 81 | 10 |
| Tokushima Vortis | 2023 | J2 League | 37 | 7 | 0 | 0 | – | | 0 | 0 | 37 | 7 |
| Tokushima Vortis | Total | | 0 | 0 | 0 | 0 | 0 | 0 | 0 | 0 | 0 | 0 |
| Career total | | | 440 | 86 | 20 | 3 | 43 | 16 | 21 | 7 | 530 | 112 |

=== International ===
As of 14 October 2014

Appearances and goals by national team and year
| National team | Year | Apps | Goals |
|---|---|---|---|
| Japan U17 | 2005 | 1 | 0 |
| Japan U17 | 2006 | 5 | 4 |
| Japan U17 | 2007 | 3 | 2 |
| Total | | 9 | 6 |
| Japan U20 | 2007 | 4 | 2 |
| Japan U20 | 2008 | 2 | 0 |
| Japan U20 | 2009 | 2 | 1 |
| Total | | 8 | 3 |
| Japan | 2013 | 9 | 4 |
| Japan | 2014 | 9 | 1 |
| Total | | 18 | 5 |

==== Under-17 ====
Scores and results list Japan's goal tally first, score column indicates score after each Kakitani goal.

List of international goals scored by Yoichiro Kakitani
| No. | Date | Venue | Opponent | Score | Result | Competition |
|---|---|---|---|---|---|---|
| 1 | 5 September 2006 | Jalan Besar Stadium, Jalan Besar, Singapore | Singapore | 1–0 | 1–1 | 2006 AFC U-17 Championship |
| 2 | 11 September 2006 | Jalan Besar Stadium, Jalan Besar, Singapore | Iran | 1–0 | 1–1 | 2006 AFC U-17 Championship |
| 3 | 14 September 2006 | Jalan Besar Stadium, Jalan Besar, Singapore | Syria | 2–0 | 2–0 | 2006 AFC U-17 Championship |
| 4 | 17 September 2006 | Jalan Besar Stadium, Jalan Besar, Singapore | North Korea | 1–2 | 4–2 | 2006 AFC U-17 Championship |
| 5 | 19 August 2007 | Gwangyang Football Stadium, Gwangyang, South Korea | Haiti | 3–1 | 3–1 | 2007 FIFA U-17 World Cup |
| 6 | 25 August 2007 | Gwangyang Football Stadium, Gwangyang, South Korea | France | 1–0 | 1–2 | 2007 FIFA U-17 World Cup |

==== Under-20 ====
Scores and results list Japan's goal tally first, score column indicates score after each Kakitani goal.

List of international goals scored by Yoichiro Kakitani
| No. | Date | Venue | Opponent | Score | Result | Competition |
|---|---|---|---|---|---|---|
| 1 | 12 November 2007 | Suphachalasai Stadium, Bangkok, Thailand | Myanmar | 8–0 | 8–0 | 2008 AFC Youth Championship qualification |
| 2 | 14 November 2007 | Suphachalasai Stadium, Bangkok, Thailand | Laos | 2–0 | 5–0 | 2008 AFC Youth Championship qualification |
| 3 | 7 December 2009 | Siu Sai Wan Sports Ground, Hong Kong | Macau | 4–0 | 5–0 | 2009 East Asian Games |

==== Senior team ====
Scores and results list Japan's goal tally first, score column indicates score after each Kakitani goal.

List of international goals scored by Yoichiro Kakitani
| No. | Date | Venue | Opponent | Score | Result | Competition |
|---|---|---|---|---|---|---|
| 1 | 21 July 2013 | Seoul World Cup Stadium, Seoul, South Korea | China | 2–1 | 3–3 | 2013 EAFF East Asian Cup |
| 2 | 28 July 2013 | Seoul Olympic Stadium, Seoul, South Korea | South Korea | 1–0 | 2–1 | 2013 EAFF East Asian Cup |
| 3 | 28 July 2013 | Seoul Olympic Stadium, Seoul, South Korea | South Korea | 2–1 | 2–1 | 2013 EAFF East Asian Cup |
| 4 | 16 November 2013 | King Baudouin Stadium, Brussels, Belgium | Belgium | 1–1 | 3–2 | Friendly |
| 5 | 4 June 2014 | Raymond James Stadium, Tampa, United States | Costa Rica | 3–1 | 3–1 | Friendly |

== Honours ==
Basel

- Swiss Super League: 2014–15, 2015–16

Cerezo Osaka

- J.League Cup: 2017
- Emperor's Cup: 2017

Nagoya Grampus

- J.League Cup: 2021

Japan

- EAFF East Asian Cup: 2013

Japan U-17

- AFC U-17 Championship: 2006

Individual

- AFC U-17 Championship Most Valuable Player: 2006
- EAFF East Asian Cup Top Scorer: 2013
- J. League Division 1 Player of the Month: May 2013
