= 2014–15 Swiss Cup =

Tournament details
- Country: Switzerland
- Teams: 64

Final positions
- Champions: Sion
- Runners-up: Basel

Tournament statistics
- Matches played: 63
- Goals scored: 239 (3.79 per match)
- Top goal scorer(s): Breel Embolo, Marco Schneuwly (6)

The 2014–15 Swiss Cup was the 90th season of Switzerland's annual football cup competition. The competition started on 23 August 2014 with the first games of Round 1 and ended on 7 June 2015 with the Final, won by Sion. As winners of the competition, they qualified for the Group Stage of the 2015–16 UEFA Europa League. The reigning title holders were Zürich.

== Participating clubs ==
All 19 teams from Super League and Challenge League (teams from Liechtenstein only play in the 2014–15 Liechtenstein Cup) automatically entered this year's competition, as well as 45 teams from lower leagues. Teams from 1. Liga Promotion and below had to qualify through separate qualifying rounds within their leagues. Teams from regional leagues had to qualify by winning the last season's regional cups.

2014–15 Super League; 9 teams	2014–15 Challenge League; 10 teams	2014–15 Promotion League; 9 teams	2014–15 1. Liga; 13 teams	2014–15 2. Liga Interregional; 9 teams	2014–15 Regional leagues 14 teams
FC Aarau (AG); FC Basel (BS); Grasshopper Zürich (ZH); FC Luzern (LU); FC Sion (VS); FC St. Gallen (SG); FC Thun (BE); BSC Young Boys (BE); FC Zürich ^{TH} (ZH)	FC Biel-Bienne (BE); FC Chiasso (TI); FC Lausanne-Sport (VD); FC Le Mont (VD); FC Lugano (TI); FC Schaffhausen (SH); Servette FC (GE); FC Wil (SG); FC Winterthur (ZH); FC Wohlen (AG)	FC Breitenrain (BE); Étoile Carouge FC (GE); FC Köniz (BE); FC Locarno (TI); Neuchâtel Xamax FCS (NE); BSC Old Boys (BS); FC Stade Nyonnais (VD); FC Tuggen (SZ); SC YF Juventus (ZH)	FC Baden (AG); FC Bavois (VD); FC Black Stars (BS); SC Cham (ZG); FC Dietikon (ZH); SC Düdingen (FR); FC Mendrisio (TI); FC Münsingen (BE); FC Muri (AG); FC Schötz (LU); FC Stade-Lausanne-Ouchy (VD); AC Taverne (TI); US Terre Sainte (VD)	SC Buochs (NW); FC Eschenbar (LU); FC Frauenfeld (TG); FC Hergiswil (NW); FK Konolfingen (BE); FC La Chaux-de-Fonds (NE); FC Perly-Certoux (GE); FC Sirnach (TG); FC Stade-Payerne (VD)	Sixth tier: ASI Audax-Friùl (NE); FC Greifensee (ZH); FC Henau (SG); CS Italien (GE); FC Murten (FR); FC Pratteln (BL); FC Rothrist (AG); FC Schönbühl (BE); FC Subingen (SO); FC Tägerwilen (TG); Vedeggio Calcio (TI); FC Visp (VS); Seventh tier: FC Nottwil (LU); SC Veltheim (AG)

^{TH} Title holders.

== Round 1 ==
Teams from Super League and Challenge League were seeded in this round. In a match, the home advantage was granted to the team from the lower league, if applicable.

Team 1	Score	Team 2
23 August 2014
FC Baden	0–3	FC St. Gallen
FC Breitenrain	2–3	FC Thun
US Terre Sainte	0–1	FC Biel-Bienne
SC Cham	2–1	SC Düdingen
CS Italien	0–4	FC Basel
BSC Old Boys	1–2	FC Lugano
SC YF Juventus	1–3	FC Lausanne-Sport
FC Muri	0–3	FC Wohlen
FC Eschenbar	1–3	FC Winterthur
FC Rothrist	0–1	FC Le Mont
FC Stade-Lausanne-Ouchy	0–1	FC Münsingen
SC Buochs	1–0	FC Frauenfeld
FC Stade-Payerne	1–4	FC Schötz
FC Dietikon	0–4	FC Wil
FC Mendrisio	0–2	FC Chiasso
FC Pratteln	0–8	FC Black Stars
SC Veltheim	2–3 (a.e.t.)	FC Henau
Vedeggio Calcio	0–2	Grasshopper Zürich
Neuchâtel Xamax FCS	1–1 (a.e.t.) (p. 4–2)	Étoile Carouge FC
FC Hergiswil	2–1	FC Tuggen
24 August 2014
FC Perly-Certoux	2–4	FC Schaffhausen
FC Sirnach	0–8	Servette FC
FC Nottwil	0–5	FC Köniz
FC Konolfingen	0–9	FC Luzern
FC Bavois	0–1	BSC Young Boys
FC La Chaux-de-Fonds	1–3	FC Sion
FC Schönbühl	0–7	FC Zürich
FC Murten	0–4	FC Stade Nyonnais
FC Greifensee	2–1	FC Subingen
FC Tägerwilen	4–1	FC Visp
AC Taverne	1–7	FC Aarau
ASI Audax-Friùl	0–2	FC Locarno

== Round 2 ==
The winners of Round 1 played in this round. Teams from Super League were seeded, the home advantage was granted to the team from the lower league, if applicable.

Team 1	Score	Team 2
19 September 2014
FC Lausanne-Sport	0–1	FC Thun
20 September 2014
FC Tägerwilen	3–9	FC Lugano
FC Münsingen	1–0	FC Locarno
FC Biel-Bienne	0–1	FC Sion
FC Chiasso	0–1	FC Aarau
FC Schaffhausen	3–5 (a.e.t.)	FC Luzern
SC Buochs	1–0	BSC Young Boys
FC Henau	2–3 (a.e.t.)	FC Wil
FC Hergiswil	1–3	FC Schötz
21 September 2014
FC Black Stars	1–2 (a.e.t.)	FC Zürich
FC Winterthur	0–4	FC Basel
Neuchâtel Xamax FCS	3–5	Grasshopper Zürich
Servette FC	1–2	FC Wohlen
FC Greifensee	2–3	SC Cham
FC Le Mont	1–2	FC St. Gallen
FC Stade Nyonnais	1–2	FC Köniz

== Round 3 ==
The winners of Round 2 played in this round. Teams from Super League were seeded, the home advantage was granted to the team from the lower league. SC Buochs, from the fifth tier of Swiss football, were the lowest-ranked team in this round.

Team 1	Score	Team 2
29 October 2014
FC Luzern	1–2	FC Aarau
FC Lugano	0–1 (a.e.t.)	Grasshopper Zürich
FC Wohlen	1–3	FC Basel
FC St. Gallen	2–1 (a.e.t.)	FC Thun
30 October 2014
FC Köniz	0–3	FC Sion
FC Münsingen	3–2	FC Wil
SC Buochs	2–0	FC Schötz
3 December 2014
SC Cham	0–5	FC Zürich

== Quarter-finals ==
The winners of Round 3 played in the Quarter-finals. There was no home advantage granted in the draw. SC Buochs, from the fifth tier of Swiss football, are the lowest-ranked team in this round.

4 March 2015
19:30

FC Münsingen	1–6	FC Basel
Plüss 81'		Hamoudi 7'; Kakitani 24', 42', 59'; Embolo 34'; Delgado 41' (pen.)

Sportanlage Sandreutenen, Münsingen
Attendance: 4,000
Referee: Alain Bieri

4 March 2015
20:15

FC Zürich	1–0 (a.e.t.)	Grasshopper Zürich
Rodríguez 96'

Letzigrund, Zürich
Attendance: 11,400
Referee: Stephan Klossner

4 March 2015
20:30

FC Sion	2–1	FC Aarau
Konaté 3'; Fernandes 27'		Seger 90+3'

Stade de Tourbillon, Sion
Attendance: 6,800
Referee: Stéphan Studer

11 March 2015
20:00

SC Buochs	0–5	FC St. Gallen
		Sikorski 27'; Rodriguez 44' (pen.); Sikorski 53'; Aratore 57'; Tafer 88'

Stadion Seefeld, Buochs
Attendance: 4,400
Referee: Adrien Jaccottet

== Semi-finals ==
7 April 2015
20:30

FC Zürich	0–1	FC Sion
		Konaté 48'

Letzigrund, Zürich
Attendance: 6,883
Referee: Stéphan Studer

8 April 2015
20:15

FC St. Gallen	1–3	FC Basel
Mutsch (yellow card) 34'; Dejan Janjatović (yellow card) 50'; Čavušević 87' (1:3); Stéphane Besle (yellow card) 89'; Everton Bilher (yellow card) 39' (yellow-red card) 90+2'	ASF/SFV summary	14' (0:1) Gashi; (yellow card) 18' Embolo; 44' (o.g. 0:2) Mutsch; 60' (0:3) Gashi; (yellow card) 90+2' Callà

AFG Arena, St. Gallen
Attendance: 16,690
Referee: Stephan Klossner

== Final ==
7 June 2015
14:00

FC Basel	0 – 3	FC Sion
Gashi (yellow card) 46'; T. Xhaka (yellow card) 49'; F. Frei (yellow card) 64'	FCB summary ASF/SFV summary	18' (0:1) Konaté; 50' (0:2) Fernandes; 60' (0:3) Carlitos; (yellow card) 72' Zverotić

St. Jakob-Park, Basel
Attendance: 35,674 (sold out)
Referee: (Switzerland) Nikolaj Hänni

Note: Beginning of the second half with a 15-minute delay, because of the firing of pyrotechnics in the Sion fan sector.

GK	(Switzerland) Germano Vailati
DF	(Albania) Taulant Xhaka	(yellow card) 49'	(substituted off) 74'
DF	(Switzerland) Fabian Schär
DF	(Czech Republic) Marek Suchý
DF	(Ivory Coast) Adama Traoré
MF	(Switzerland) Fabian Frei	(yellow card) 65'
MF	(Albania) Shkëlzen Gashi	(yellow card) 46'
MF	(Egypt) Mohamed Elneny
MF	(Switzerland) Luca Zuffi
ST	(Switzerland) Davide Callà		(substituted off) 53'
ST	(Switzerland) Marco Streller (c)		(substituted off) 75'
Substitutes:
DF	(Egypt) Ahmed Hamoudi		(substituted on) 53'
MF	(Argentina) Matías Delgado		(substituted on) 74'
FW	(Switzerland) Albian Ajeti		(substituted on) 75'
Manager:
(Portugal) Paulo Sousa

GK	(Latvia) Andris Vaņins
DF	(Montenegro) Elsad Zverotić	(yellow card) 72'
DF	(Switzerland) Léo Lacroix
DF	(Switzerland) Reto Ziegler
DF	(The Gambia) Pa Modou Jagne
MF	(Portugal) Carlitos
MF	(Ivory Coast) Xavier Kouassi (c)
MF	(Switzerland) Vero Salatić
ST	(Switzerland) Edimilson Fernandes		(substituted off) 73'
ST	(Ghana) Ebenezer Assifuah		(substituted off) 75'
ST	(Senegal) Pape Moussa Konaté		(substituted off) 85'
Substitutes:
MF	(Switzerland) Michael Perrier		(substituted on) 73'
MF	(Switzerland) Daniel Follonier		(substituted on) 75'
MF	(Cyprus) Demetris Christofi		(substituted on) 85'
Manager:
(France) Didier Tholot

=== Match summary ===
The Final was played on 7 June 2015 Basel against Sion and with an attendance of 35,674 fans the St. Jakob-Park was sold out. Referee was Nikolaj Hänni. An ex-Basler was the match winner for Sion. The Portuguese technical genius Carlitos played the two deadly passes into the depth, which led to the 1–0 by goal getter Moussa Konaté on 18 minutes and the 2–0 by Edimilson Fernandes on 50 minutes. Carlitos himself scored the goal for the 3–0 final result after an hours play. He scored after a cross from Elsad Zverotić with a diving header.

=== Conclusion ===
The FC Sion cup myth is still persistent, even after the final; they celebrated their 13th victory in their 13th final of this knockout competition. Sion has beaten their opponents with a significant difference, including inside their own stadium. The 13th Cup triumph will have a large impact in the club's history. The Red-Whites have never been able to win a cup final so quickly and the fact that this was achieved with the Super League club over the previous years was an achievement the team accomplished.

== Sources ==
- Josef Zindel (2018). FC Basel 1893. Die ersten 125 Jahre (in German). Basel: Friedrich Reinhardt Verlag. ISBN 978-3-7245-2305-5.
- Switzerland 2014/15 Swiss Cup at RSSSF
