= Chikhaoui =

Chikhaoui is a Tunisian surname. Notable people with the surname include:

- Haykeul Chikhaoui (born 1996), Tunisian football midfielder
- Raed Chikhaoui (born 2004), Tunisian football centre-back
- Yassine Chikhaoui (born 1986), Tunisian football forward
