= Michael Perrier =

Swiss footballer (born 1989)

Personal information
- Date of birth: 1 March 1989 (age 37)
- Place of birth: Sion, Switzerland
- Height: 1.73 m (5 ft 8 in)
- Position: Midfielder

Senior career*
Years	Team	Apps	(Gls)
2006–2010	Lugano	89	(5)
2010–2012	Genoa	0	(0)
2010–2012	→ Chiasso (loan)	44	(1)
2012–2013	Bellinzona	31	(1)
2013–2015	Sion	42	(2)
2015–2018	Aarau	98	(2)
2019–2021	Stade Lausanne Ouchy	54	(3)

International career
2006	Switzerland U-18	1	(0)
2008–2010	Switzerland U-20	5	(0)
- * Club domestic league appearances and goals as of 19 March 2021

Michael Perrier (born 1 March 1989) is a Swiss footballer.

Perrier made his top division debut during 2013–14 Swiss Super League.

== Biography ==
Son of former Sion player Bernard Perrier, Perrier started his career at Lugano, from Italian speaking canton of Ticino. Perrier was signed by the sister club, Italian Serie A side Genoa on 18 May 2009 for €650,000. Perrier signed a 3-year contract but spent whole of the contract in temporary deals in Lugano (2009–10) and Chiasso (2010–12). On 1 July 2012 he became a free agent. He was signed by fellow Swiss second division club Bellinzona, which also from Ticino on 13 June 2012 in 1-year contract.

On 31 August 2013 he was signed by Sion of Swiss Super League. His contract was soon extended.

Michael Perrier signed with Stade Lausanne Ouchy in 2019.

=== International career ===
Perrier had capped 5 times for Switzerland U-20 team, all in the Four Nations.

== Honours ==
Sion

- Swiss Cup: 2014–15
