= Daniel Preradovic =

Swiss footballer (born 1992)

Personal information
- Date of birth: 20 October 1992 (age 34)
- Position: Forward

Senior career*
Years	Team	Apps	(Gls)
–2014	SC Düdingen		
2014–2015	FC Münsingen	22	(0)
2015–2016	FC Bern	0	(0)
2016	FC Rot-Weiß Rankweil	9	(6)
2016–2017	Floridsdorfer AC	3	(0)
- * Club domestic league appearances and goals as of 26 May 2017

Daniel Preradovic (born 20 October 1992) is a Swiss footballer.
