= 2007 UEMOA Tournament =

Tournament details
- Host country: Burkina Faso
- City: Ouagadougou
- Teams: 8 (from 1 confederation)
- Venue: Stade du 4-Août (in Ouagadougou host cities)

Final positions
- Champions: Ivory Coast
- Runners-up: Niger

Tournament statistics
- Top scorer: Baro Babou

All matches were played at the Stade du 4-Août, Ouagadougou, Burkina Faso.

== Group A ==
=== Results ===
Burkina Faso	0 - 0	Niger
Senegal	0 - 0	Togo
Niger	2 - 1	Togo
Senegal	0 - 0	Burkina Faso
Burkina Faso	2 - 1	Togo
Niger	3 - 2	Senegal

=== Final table ===
Pos	Team	Pld	W	D	L	GF	GA	GD	Pts	Qualification
1	Niger	3	2	1	0	5	3	+2	7	Advance to Final
2	Burkina Faso (H)	3	1	2	0	2	1	+1	5	
3	Senegal	3	0	2	1	2	3	−1	2	
4	Togo	3	0	1	2	2	4	−2	1	

Rules for classification: Tiebreakers
(H) Hosts

== Group B ==
=== Results ===
Ivory Coast	5-0	Guinea-Bissau
Benin	0-3	Mali
Mali	4-0	Guinea-Bissau
Ivory Coast	1-0	Benin
Ivory Coast	2-0	Mali
Guinea-Bissau	1-1	Benin

=== Final table ===
Pos	Team	Pld	W	D	L	GF	GA	GD	Pts	Qualification
1	Ivory Coast	3	3	0	0	8	0	+8	9	Advance to Final
2	Mali	3	2	0	1	7	2	+5	6	
3	Benin	3	0	1	2	1	5	−4	1	
4	Guinea-Bissau	3	0	1	2	1	10	−9	1	

Rules for classification: Tiebreakers

== Final ==
Ivory Coast	2-0	Niger

== Top goalscorers ==
Nation	Player name	Goals Scored
Ivory Coast	Babou Barro	4
Mali	Souleymane Dembele	3
Ivory Coast	Lebri Ouraga	2
Niger	Saidou Idrissa	2
