= Moussa Konaté (footballer) =

Senegalese footballer (born 1993)

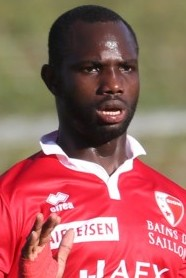
- Konaté with Sion in 2016

Personal information
- Full name: Moussa Konaté
- Date of birth: 3 April 1993 (age 33)
- Place of birth: M'Bour, Senegal
- Height: 1.80 m (5 ft 11 in)
- Position: Forward

Youth career
- 2005–2010: Toure Kunda de Mbour

Senior career*
Years	Team	Apps	(Gls)
2010–2011	Toure Kunda de Mbour	13	(3)
2011–2012	Maccabi Tel Aviv	29	(5)
2012–2014	Krasnodar	10	(1)
2013–2014	→ Genoa (loan)	25	(1)
2014–2017	Sion	93	(35)
2017–2020	Amiens	76	(22)
2020–2023	Dijon	27	(5)
2021–2022	→ Espérance Tunis (loan)	5	(1)
2022	→ Sivasspor (loan)	12	(0)
2023	Dinamo Batumi	13	(2)
2023–2025	Bourges	30	(7)

International career
2010–2012	Senegal U20	4	(0)
2012	Senegal U23	4	(5)
2012–2019	Senegal	34	(12)
Medal record
Africa Cup of Nations
Runner-up	2019
- * Club domestic league appearances and goals as of 21:54, 26 October 2023 (UTC)

Moussa Konaté (born 3 April 1993) is a Senegalese professional footballer who plays as a forward for the Senegal national team.

== Career ==
=== Early career ===
Moussa Konaté started his career playing for Senegalese second division club ASC Toure Kunda de Mbour, helping them to win promotion to the top division and win the Senegal FA Cup for the 2010 season, which resulted in a 2011 CAF Confederation Cup appearance. In spring 2011 Konaté went to Israel for a months trial with Maccabi Tel Aviv. He impressed Maccabi's coach Moti Ivanir enough to become Maccabi's first signing for the 2011–12 season.

=== Maccabi Tel Aviv ===
After signing a two-year contract with the club, Konaté became Maccabi's fifth foreign player in the squad. He made his debut playing in the UEFA Europa League second qualifying round against Khazar Lankaran scoring the first goal and assisting the second for Eliran Atar in Maccabi's victory 3–1.

=== Krasnodar ===
After excelling playing for Senegal in the 2012 Summer Olympics scoring five goals, Konaté joined Russian club Krasnodar for a fee of €2 million. After joining Krasnodar, he revealed he had rejected Premier League clubs in favour of Krasnodar.

==== Loan to Genoa ====
On 12 July 2013, Konaté joined Italian Serie A side Genoa on a season-long loan deal.

=== Amiens ===
On 13 August 2017, Konaté signed a four-year contract with Amiens.

=== Dijon ===
Following Amiens's relegation from Ligue 1 in the 2019–20 season, Konaté signed a three-year contract with Dijon on 20 October 2020, for a fee of €2.4 million.

==== Loan to Espérance Tunis ====
On 15 September 2021, Konaté joined Tunisian side Espérance Tunis on a season-long loan deal with an option to buy.

==== Loan to Sivasspor ====
On 12 February 2022, Konaté moved on loan to Sivasspor in Turkey.

=== Dinamo Batumi ===
On 24 January 2023, Konaté joined Dinamo Batumi in Georgia on a one-year deal.

=== Bourges ===
On 26 October 2023, Konaté signed for Championnat National 2 (French 4th division) club Bourges, that had been recently bought by his former international teammate Sadio Mané.

== International career ==
Konaté started all of Senegal's matches at the 2012 Olympic tournament in which the nation reached the quarter-finals. In the first group game at Old Trafford, he scored an 82nd-minute equaliser in a 1–1 draw with hosts Great Britain.

Konaté was named in the Senegal squad for the 2015 Africa Cup of Nations after Diafra Sakho withdrew due to injury.

In May 2018 he was named in Senegal's 23-man squad for the 2018 FIFA World Cup in Russia.

== Career statistics ==
=== Club ===
As of match played 27 July 2020

Appearances and goals by club, season and competition
Club	Season	League			Cup		Other		Total	
Club	Season	Division	Apps	Goals	Apps	Goals	Apps	Goals	Apps	Goals
Maccabi Tel Aviv	2011–12	Israeli Premier League	29	5	0	0	9 (Note: Appearance(s) in UEFA Europa League)	2	38	7
Krasnodar	2012–13	Russian Premier League	10	1	2	0	0	0	12	1
Genoa (loan)	2013–14	Serie A	25	1	1	0	0	0	26	1
Sion	2014–15	Swiss Super League	27	16	5	4	1	2	33	22
Sion	2015–16	Swiss Super League	29	10	2	1	7	3	38	14
Sion	2016–17	Swiss Super League	33	8	5	4	0	0	38	12
Sion	2017–18	Swiss Super League	4	1	0	0	2	1	6	2
Sion	Total		93	35	12	9	10	6	115	50
Amiens	2017–18	Ligue 1	33	13	2	1	0	0	35	14
Amiens	2018–19	Ligue 1	27	7	1	0	0	0	28	7
Amiens	2019–20	Ligue 1	12	2	2	0	0	0	14	2
Amiens	Total		72	22	5	1	0	0	77	23
Career total			223	61	30	10	19	8	262	79

=== International ===
As of match played 1 July 2019

Appearances and goals by national team and year
National team	Year	Apps	Goals
Senegal	2012	5	1
Senegal	2014	2	1
Senegal	2015	9	5
Senegal	2016	5	1
Senegal	2017	3	0
Senegal	2018	6	3
Senegal	2019	4	1
Total		34	12

Scores and results list Senegal's goal tally first, score column indicates score after each Konaté goal

List of international goals scored by Moussa Konaté
No.	Date	Venue	Opponent	Score	Result	Competition
1	25 May 2012	Stade de Marrakech, Marrakesh, Morocco	Morocco	1–0	1–0	Friendly
2	31 May 2014	Estadio Pedro Bidegain, Buenos Aires, Argentina	Colombia	1–2	2–2	Friendly
3	13 January 2015	Stade Larbi Benbarek, Casablanca, Morocco	Guinea	5–1	5–2	Friendly
4	28 March 2015	Stade Océane, Le Havre, France	Ghana	1–0	2–1	Friendly
5	28 March 2015	Stade Océane, Le Havre, France	Ghana	2–0	2–1	Friendly
6	13 June 2015	Stade Léopold Sédar Senghor, Dakar, Senegal	Burundi	1–0	3–1	2017 Africa Cup of Nations qualification
7	17 November 2015	Stade Léopold Sédar Senghor, Dakar, Senegal	Madagascar	2–0	3–0	2018 FIFA World Cup qualification
8	29 March 2016	Stade Général-Seyni-Kountché, Niamey, Niger	Niger	1–0	2–1	2017 Africa Cup of Nations qualification
9	23 March 2018	Stade Mohammed V, Casablanca, Morocco	Uzbekistan	1–1	1–1	Friendly
10	11 June 2018	Untersberg-Arena, Grödig, Austria	South Korea	2–0	2–0	Friendly
11	9 September 2018	Mahamasina Municipal Stadium, Antananarivo, Madagascar	Madagascar	1–0	2–2	2019 Africa Cup of Nations qualification
12	26 March 2019	Stade Léopold Sédar Senghor, Dakar, Senegal	Mali	2–1	2–1	Friendly

== Honours ==
Sion

- Swiss Cup: 2014–15

Sivasspor

- Turkish Cup: 2021–22
