= Dejan Janjatović =

German footballer

Personal information
- Date of birth: 25 February 1992 (age 34)
- Place of birth: Slavonski Brod, Croatia
- Height: 1.86 m (6 ft 1 in)
- Position: Midfielder

Youth career
- SV Fürstenstein
- –2008: SV Neuperlach
- 2008–2011: Bayern Munich

Senior career*
Years	Team	Apps	(Gls)
2011	Bayern Munich II	1	(0)
2011–2012	Getafe B	1	(0)
2012	St. Gallen II	10	(3)
2012–2015	St. Gallen	93	(4)
2016–2017	FC Vaduz	23	(5)
2017–2018	Bruk-Bet Termalica	6	(0)
2019	SC Brühl	3	(0)
2021–2022	FC Rorschach-Goldach		

International career
2010	Germany U18	4	(0)
2010	Germany U19	1	(0)
- * Club domestic league appearances and goals

Dejan Janjatović (Serbian Cyrillic: Дејан Јањатовић; born 25 February 1992) is a German former professional footballer who played as a midfielder.

== Career ==
Janjatović is a product of the Bayern Munich Junior Team, and made an appearance for Bayern's reserve team in March 2011, replacing Mario Erb in a 3. Liga match against SV Babelsberg 03. He was released by Bayern at the end of the 2010–11 season and moved to Spain to sign for Getafe. After six months playing for Getafe's reserve team, he signed for Swiss side FC St. Gallen. After a spell in FC Vaduz, he was released in summer 2017.

After half a year of free agency, Janjatović signed for Polish side Bruk-Bet Termalica Nieciecza managed by Maciej Bartoszek. He made his Ekstraklasa debut in 2–4 loss against Zagłębie Lubin on 2 December 2017. In March 2018, after making 6 league appearances for Nieciecza, Janjatović left the club in a mutual agreement.

He is of Serbian descent, born in war-time Croatia and was called up to the German U18 and U19 national teams as well as Serbian U21 side. He is still eligible for the German and Serbian national teams.

On 16 February 2019, Janjatović joined SC Brühl.

== Honours ==
FC Vaduz

- Liechtenstein Football Cup: 2015–16, 2016–17
