= 2016–17 FC Basel season =

FC Basel
2016–17 season
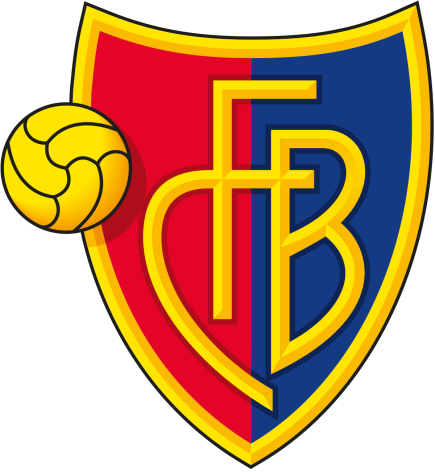
- Owner: FCB Holding
- Chairman: Bernhard Heusler
- Manager: Urs Fischer
- Ground: St. Jakob-Park, Basel, Switzerland
- Super League: 1st (champions)
- Swiss Cup: Winners
- Champions League: Group stage
- Top goalscorer: League: Seydou Doumbia (20); All: Seydou Doumbia (21)
- Highest home attendance: 30,817 vs Young Boys 9 April 2017
- Lowest home attendance: 23,339 vs Sion 18.05.17
- Average home league attendance: 26,484
Home colours	Away colours

The 2016–17 FC Basel season was the 124th edition in club history and the club's 22nd consecutive season in the top flight of Swiss football. Basel are the reigning Swiss Super League champions. They prepared their season with various warm-up matches against teams from Germany, Russia and France as well as from Switzerland. The 2016–17 Swiss Super League season started on the week-end 23/24 July, the last round was played on 2 June 2017. Basel started with a home game against Sion.

Basel were qualified for the 2016–17 UEFA Champions League in the Group stage. The draw was held on 25 August 2016, at the Grimaldi Forum in Monaco. Basel were drawn into Group A along with Paris Saint-Germain, Arsenal and Ludogorets Razgrad. The first game was at home against Razgrad on 13 September and the last being the home game against Arsenal on 6 December.

The draw for the first round of the 2016–17 Swiss Cup was held on 1 July 2016. The Super- and Challenge League clubs were seeded and could not be drawn against each other. The lower division teams were granted home game advantage. The first round was played on the week-end 13/14 August 2016. The final was played in Stade de Genève on 25 May 2017.

== Club ==
=== FC Basel Holding AG ===
The FC Basel Holding AG owns 75% of FC Basel 1893 AG and the other 25% is owned by the club FC Basel 1893 members. The shareholders of the Holding AG were Bernhard Heusler, Stephan Werthmüller and Georg Heitz. The club FC Basel 1893 functions as a base club independent of the holding company and the AG. FC Basel 1893 AG is responsible for the operational business of the club, e.g. the 1st team, a large part of the youth department and the back office are affiliated to the AG. All decisions that affect the club FC Basel 1893 are made within the AG.

=== Club management ===
The FC Basel AGM took place on 18 June 2016. The board of directors under president Bernhard Heusler with vice-president Adrian Knup, sport director Georg Heitz, financial manager Stephan Werthmüller and marketing manager René Kamm, and the three directors Reto Baumgartner, Dominik Donzé and Benno Kaiser were willing to continue as before. They were all re-elected unanimously.

Chairman	(Switzerland) Mr Bernhard Heusler
Vice Chairman	(Switzerland) Mr Adrian Knup
Finances	(Switzerland) Mr Stephan Werthmüller
Sport Director	(Switzerland) Mr Georg Heitz
Marketing	(Switzerland) Mr René Kamm
Director	(Switzerland) Mr Reto Baumgartner
Director	(Switzerland) Mr Dominik Donzé
Director	(Switzerland) Mr Benno Kaiser
Ground (capacity and dimensions)	St. Jakob-Park (38,512) (37,500 for international matches) / 120x80 m)

Updated to match played 18 June 2016
Source: FCB Official Site

=== Team management ===
Urs Fischer had a running three-year contract as first team manager, which started in June 2015. His assistants were Werner Leuthard, Marco Walker and Markus Hoffmann. Massimo Colomba was the Goalkeeper coach. Massimo Ceccaroni was head of the FCB Youth System. The new coach of the Youth Team (U–21) was Raphaël Wicky.

Position	Staff
Manager	(Switzerland) Urs Fischer (since 18 June 2015)
1 Assistant manager	(Switzerland) Werner Leuthard
2 Assistant manager	(Austria) Markus Hoffmann
3 Assistant manager	(Switzerland) Marco Walker
Goalkeeper Coach	(Switzerland) Massimo Colomba
Team Administration	(Switzerland) Gustav Nussbaumer
Youth Team Coach	(Switzerland) Raphaël Wicky (from July 2016)
Youth Team Co-Coach	(Switzerland) Romain Villiger

Last updated: 23 July 2016
Source: FCB Official Site

== Overview ==
=== Offseason and preseason ===
At the end of the 2015–16 FC Basel season Philipp Degen ended his football career and retired from professional football. Between the years 2001 to 2005 and again from 2011 to 2016 Degen played a total of 333 games for Basel scoring a total of 18 goals. 158 of these games were in the Swiss Super League, 22 in the Swiss Cup, 39 were in a UEFA European-competitions (Champions League, UEFA Cup, Europa League and UIC) and 114 were friendly games. He scored eleven goals in the domestic league, one in the cup, one in the Champions League and the other five were scored during the test games. During his career with FCB Degen won the Swiss championship eight times and the domestic cup twice.

Also, during the previous season Behrang Safari decided to return to Sweden due to family reasons at the end of the season. He signed for Malmö FF. Between the years 2008 to 2011 and again from 2013 to 2016_ Safari played a total of 291 games for Basel scoring a total of 3 goals. 157 of these games were in the Swiss Super League, 14 in the Swiss Cup, 59 were in a UEFA European-competitions (Champions League and Europa League) and 61 were friendly games. He scored one goal in the domestic league, the other two were scored during the test games. During his six seasons with FCB Safari won the Swiss championship five times and the domestic cup once.

At the end of the 2015–16 FC Basel season Walter Samuel also ended his football career. Behrang Safari left the club to continue his career by his home club Malmö FF. Breel Embolos transfer to Schalke 04 was confirmed by both teams on 26 June. Despite the fact that he still had a valid contract Naser Aliji joined 2. Bundesliga side 1. FC Kaiserslautern on a free transfer.

Basel announced on 31 August that the contract between them and the 26-year-old Egyptian international Ahmed Hamoudi had been resolved on mutual consent with immediate effect. On 2 September Basel announced that Nicolas Hunziker had been loaned out to the Grasshoppers to gain playing experience. That far during the current season Hunziker had played four games in the Promotion League with the FCB U-21 team, scoring five goals.

On 4 May Basel announced that they had signed 18 year old Paraguayan defender Blás Riveros from Olimpia Asunción on a five-year deal. Due to Riveros commitments with the Paraguay national football team and the Copa America, he was not expected to join the Basel first team until the beginning of July. On 10 May Basel also announced that they had signed Egyptian defender Omar Gaber from Zamalek on a four-year deal. On 15 June Serbian goalkeeper Đorđe Nikolić transferred in from Jagodina, signing a four-year contract. Basel announced on 28 June that they had signed Seydou Doumbia on loan from Roma until 30 June 2017. Three further transfers in were Mohamed Elyounoussi who signed in from Molde, Kevin Bua who came from Zürich and Éder Balanta who transferred in from River Plate. Each of whom signed a four-year deal. One former player transferred back in from VfB Stuttgart, Geoffroy Serey Die, who had left the club a year and a half before due to differences with the former team manager Paulo Sousa.

=== Mid-season break ===
On 25 January 2017 Basel announced that Birkir Bjarnason had transferred out and Aston Villa confirmed the move. On 31 January 2017 Basel announced that Jean-Paul Boëtius was loaned out to K.R.C. Genk until the end of the season.

== The Campaign ==
=== Domestic League ===
First half of season

Basel's priority aim for the new season is to win the league championship for the eighth consecutive time. The 2016–17 Swiss Super League season started on the week-end 23/24 July. Basel played at home game against Sion. Four of the new signings, Gabar, Balanta, Elyounoussi and Doumbia made their first team league debuts in the 3–0 home win. Doumbia scored his first goal for his new club in the same game and just one week later on 31 July during the away game against Vaduz he scored his second. It was the last goal of the game and Basel won 5–1. Basel took first position in the league table from the very beginning. In fact they started the season very well, winning each of their first seven games, scoring at least three goals in each fixture. After these seven games they were nine points clear of BSC Young Boys in second place and Luzern in third. They had scored 24 goals conceding just five. By the winter break Basel had extended their lead to 12 points ahead of the Young Boys who were in second place in the league table, winning 15, drawing two and only one defeat, scoring 49 and conceding just 15 goals in their 18 matches.

Second half of season

The second half of season began on 4 February 2017. In their first game Elyounoussi scored a hat trick for Basel during the home game against Lugano. These were the first three goals and were scored during the first 36 minutes of the game that Basel won 4–0. Basel won nine, drawing three during February, March and April to move clear at the top of the table. Despite that they suffered a defeat in the Stade de Suisse in round 34 against second placed Young Boys, Basel ended the season 17 points clear of their rivals.

Basel were victors in 26 matches, drew eight and suffered only two defeats in the 36 Super League matches, gaining a total of 86 points. The team scored 92 goals (league's highest scorers) with 35 goals against (league's best defence) and ended with a goal difference of +57. Basel's Seydou Doumbia was the club and the Super League top goalscorer with 20 goals. Marc Janko scored 13, both Matías Delgado and Mohamed Elyounoussi ended the season with ten goals. Elyounoussi was the team's top final pass giver with 13 assists.

=== Domestic Cup ===
Basel's clear aim for the 2016–17 Swiss Cup is to regain the title that they last won in 2011–12. The draw for the first round was held on 1 July 2016. In the first-round teams from Super League and Challenge League were seeded and could not play against each other. In a match, the home advantage was granted to the team from the lower league, if applicable.

Rapperswil-Jona (14 August 2016)

Basel were drawn away against Rapperswil-Jona who at that time played in the 1. Liga Promotion, the third tier in the Swiss football pyramid. The match was played in the Stadion Grünfeld in Rapperswil with an attendance of 4,350 fans and this was a stadium record. The underdogs started well into the game and the visitors had problems getting into their game. Until the interval the few opportunities that FCB created were all wasted or the ball was saved by the well reacting goalkeeping. Even after the break the favourites had problems with themselves. But in the end the minimum margin was enough for FCB to the advance to the next round. Midfielder Jean-Paul Boëtius, so far without a single minute of play in the league, saved the team from possibly malicious comments, with the only goal of the game. The leader of the Promotion League braced themselves with flying colours and tactical skill against the Champions League participants, who, however, only made the minimum of efforts. The FCRJ defended flawlessly until the 58th minute, before the Dutch Boëtius beat the brilliant amateur goalkeeper Diego Yanz for the only time.

Zug 94 (18 September 2016)

Teams from Super League were seeded in round 2 and the home advantage was granted to the team from the lower league. Basel were drawn against Zug 94, who at that time played in the 1. Liga, the fourth tier of Swiss football. The match was played in the Herti Allmend Stadion in Zug with an attendance of 4,200 spectators. The FCB coach Urs Fischer rested the entire first team, bringing in eleven new players compared with their last match. The only goal of the match was scored by Daniel Hoegh with a header in the 45th minute. Following corner from Jean Paul Boëtius to the rear post, the central defender jumped the highest to score an unsavable goal. The lower-class team tried everything to make up for this narrow deficit, but realistic opportunities to do so were hardly to be seen. Basel again had to be content with a minimal 1–0 win away against Zug 94. FCB's second formation did not do more than required to advance. Apart from the always committed Geoffroy Serey Die, one or the other player's ambition to play in the starting line-up was completely missing.

Tuggen (26 October 2016)

There was no seeding in round 3, but the home advantage was still granted to the team from the lower league. Basel were drawn against Tuggen, who at that time played in the 1. Liga Promotion, the third tier of Swiss football. Referee of the natch held in the Linthstrasse in Tuggen with an attendance of 4,150 fans was Sascha Amhof. The FCB coach Urs Fischer had announced in advance that he would not rest the entire first team against Tuggen, as he did in the last round. Tuggen started well into the match and the underdogs had the first big chance of the game, but the shot went wide. Basel's first chance came on eight minutes, a cross from Michael Lang was headed away by the defence but the ball landed at Jean-Paul Boëtius feet and his cross-goal shot made it 1–0 for the visitors. Ten minutes later, the Dutchman doubled up from the penalty point after Lang had been fouled in the area. Lang scored the 3–0 in the 35th minute after a corner from Luca Zuffi. Shortly before the break, Eder Balanta made it 4–0 following another corner Zuffi. Four minutes after the break Birkir Bjarnason's shot was deflected and landed on the top of the cross bar. After an hour FCB started to take things easier, changing a gear lower and so saved the lower-tier team from a runaway defeat. The motto was live and let live or rather play and let play. Tuggen's captain Shala had a good header, but over the top, Serey Die's long-range hammer was punched away by Tuggen keeper Waldvogel. Tuggen came better into play and after two/three chances eventually scored the consolation goal through Jusuf Shala in stoppage time. The FCB moved confidently into the quarter-finals.

Zürich (2 March 2017)

In the draw to the quarter-final Basel were matched against Zürich, who were the cup holders and had at the same time been relegated to the second tier. The draw had given Basel home advantage and the St. Jakob-Park was full of atmosphere with an attendance of 25,259 fans, but the mood changed quickly as Oliver Buff put the visitors in front in the third minute. The atmosphere on the pitch was equally rough, referee Alain Bieri pulled his cards regularly. A yellow card for Basel's Renato Steffen after 8 minutes (but it could also have been red), for Zürich's Alain Nef and Cédric Brunner in the 14th minute and for Basel's Taulant Xhaka on 28 minutes. But football was also played, Basel's Marc Janko marked the equaliser per head on 20 minutes after a cross from Michael Lang. Following a Basel free kick, the Züricher defence cleared the ball to the right, Lang controlled the ball on the by-line and hit it low to the centre, keeper Andris Vaņins stooped to pick it up, but it bounced into the net from his leg. Taulant Xhaka was shown the second yellow card on 56, but even with one player less, the hosts were better. Renato Steffen scored with a long range left foot effort on 75 minutes and Basel earned themselves the 3–1 win to qualify for the semi-final.

Winterthur (5 April 2017)

The draw for the semi-final gave Winterthur a home tie in the Schützenwiese with an attendance of 9,400 fans sold-out and these saw an attractive match between the actual bottom club in the Challenge League and the Super League leaders. Ball possession was level, but Winterthur created the better opportunities in the first period. Basel keeper Tomáš Vaclík pushed one effort from Gianluca Frontino in extremis against the post and he made three further big saves before the break. Renato Steffen had the best chance for Basel in the 20th minute. In the 51st minute referee Sascha Amhof awarded a penalty for Basel and this gave ground for many discussions after the match, because Winterthur's Captain Patrik Schuler played ball and man, in that order. Matías Delgado converted the spot-kick. But the game remained dramatic, until the 85th minute, when Basel netted their second goal following a set piece. The free-kick from the right was brought high into the area, the ball was headed towards the left, Delgado played it backwards towards Luca Zuffi, his shot was blocked by keeper Matthias Minder, but the ball fell for Manuel Akanji who scored from close distance. Of all people Akanji, the former Winterthur youth and first team player. But just two minutes later Tomáš Vaclík restored the dramatic. Not under pressure he made an error playing the ball out, it rolled to Arxhend Cani, who converted side footed from 25 metres out. In added time Alexander Fransson scored the 3–1 result for Basel.

Sion (25 May 2017)

The cup final in the 2016–17 Swiss Cup took place in Stade de Genève in Lancy, Geneva between Basel and Sion on Ascension Thursday, a public holiday in Switzerland. Basel had reached the cup final 21 times in the club's history and won the trophy on 11 occasions to this date. A sidenote to here, is that they had ended the cup competitions as runners-up in their last three finals, in 2013 against GC, in 2014 against Zürich and 2015 against today's opponents Sion. Sion had reached 13 finals in their history and had won on all 13 occasions. A side note here, is that the town Sion is the capital of the Canton of Valais and the coat of arms of the Canton has 13 stars in it.

Arbitrator in the final was Stephan Klossner and as he blew his whistle for kick-off, he did this in front of 26,500 fans. It was immediately clear that there was a lot at stake in this match. Both teams were fully commitment right from the start. Therefore, they neutralized each other and even if there was a lot of tempi in play, there were no dangerous scenes for a long time. After half an hour it was FCB who had the first good opportunity, following a Matías Delgado corner Mohamed Elyounoussi's header went slightly wide of the post. This remained the only dangerous scene in the weakly played and largely unemotional first period. The second half began quite different, after just two minutes, Elyounoussi benefited from a mistake by Pa Modou and played to Seydou Doumbia, who found Delgado in a perfect finishing position, and the Argentine gave FCB the lead. The Basel team had to survive a dangerous scene shortly afterwards, but Reto Ziegler's free kick from a favourable position flew well past the goal. Then it was FCB's turn again and became dominant. After about an hour of play Renato Steffen's effort was blocked, but Adama Traoré was well positioned and from close range he poked the ball between keeper Anton Mitryushkin's legs to make it 2–0. There were no real dangerous moments in front of the FCB goal and in the end, the Basel team then made a visual treat with the last move of the game and to the 3–0 win. Marc Janko headed a cross on to Michael Lang, who struck home directly from an acute angle.

Conclusion

It went wrong in their 14th final, the Sion team was defeated by a dominant FCB and lost a cup final for the first time in the club's history. The Sion cup myth was broken. From a FCB point of view, the club's cup aim to reach the final and win the trophy was achieved. By this date the league championship had mathematically been decided and so with this trophy Basel had achieved the domestic double.

=== Champions League ===
Basel entered into this season's Champions League in the Group stage. The draw was held on 25 August 2016, at the Grimaldi Forum in Monaco. Basel were drawn into Group A along with Paris Saint-Germain, Arsenal and Ludogorets Razgrad. The first game was at home against Ludogorets on 13 September and the last being the home game against Arsenal on 6 December. The club's initial aim was to remain in the competition after the group stage or else their minimum aim was third position and a transfer to the Europa League knockout phase.

Ludogorets Razgrad (13 September 2016)

The first game was played in St. Jakob-Park with an attendance of 30,852 spectators. Basel took control of the game from the start. But despite a few chances early in the game, Bjarnason on 2 minutes, Steffen 6th minute and Delgado 7th minute, Basel were not able to create many good chances against the massive Ludogorets Razgrad defence. Ludogorets waited for counterattacks. Basel's Janko injured himself and was replaced by Doumbia in the 40th minute. Ludogorets went into the lead just before half time, a breakaway goal by Brazilian forward Cafu. He ran on to a measured pass from Marcelinho, he turned Marek Suchý inside out and slotted in a low shot past Tomáš Vaclík on 45 minutes. Basel dominated the second period. But they created only few clear scoring opportunities, but were then given their chance to equalize as Ludogorets goalkeeper Vladislav Stoyanov flapped at defender Michel Lang's long cross. The ball fell into Steffen's path and he volleyed into an unguarded net from a tight angle (79).

Arsenal (28 September 2016)

Basel's second game was away from home in the Emirates Stadium in front of 59,993 spectators as guests of Arsenal Football Club. This was the first ever meeting between the clubs in European competition. Arsenal made two changes to the side that had beaten Chelsea in the Premier League on the previous Saturday, with David Ospina replacing Petr Čech between the posts. Replacing the injured Francis Coquelin in the centre of midfield, Granit Xhaka started against the team he began his career with and also faced his brother Taulant for the first time in club football. Mohamed Elneny was also brought on as a substitute against his former side. Urs Fischer, on the other hand, had shuffled his pack from their visit to St. Gallen at the weekend, with his front four completely changing. Theo Walcott scored a first half double, with a brace in assists from Sánchez securing a 2–0 win. The first was a lightning break from Arsenal, a ball over the top found Alexis Sánchez in acres of space in the right hand channel and he deftly whipped in a volleyed cross which the Englishman made no mistake with, burying his header past Vaclík. The second was almost too easy for Arsenal, as they waltzed through the Basel defence again. Walcott strolled up to the edge of the box unchallenged, played a perfect one-two with Alexis Sánchez, who was standing with his back to goal, and clinically dispatched the return ball into the far corner, off the post. The home team were all over the visitors, and their one touch passing was sublime to watch. Walcott and Özil played back to Sánchez, but his shot was incredibly saved by Vaclík. Bellerín had a chance and again Vaclík did brilliantly to parry. It was completely and utterly one sided in North London and Basel looked shell shocked, especially during the first half.

Paris Saint-Germain (19 October 2016)

Basel's second away game in the third round was in the Parc des Princes with an attendance of 46,448 fans as visitors to Paris Saint-Germain. This was also the first ever meeting between these two clubs in European competition. In the 5th Minute Delgado took a corner kick which was headed on to the middle by Bjarnason and then Lang headed the ball onto the cross bar. Lang, Steffen and Doumbia missed further good chances. Another chance for the visitors in the 36th minute and Doumbia's angled header hit the post. In the 40th minute Blaise Matuidi's low cross was touched off by Edinson Cavani and Ángel Di María thundered his right-foot strike the ball into the roof of the net. Lucas Moura put the hosts two goals up on 62 minutes. Suchý had a chance in the 66th minute but his header hit the cross bar, this was the third time that Basel struck the ball against woodwork. In the 93rd minute referee Deniz Aytekin from the German Football Association saw Cavani fall after a light touch from Basel defender Lang and awarded a penalty. Cavani converted the spot-kick to make the result a very unlucky 0–3 for the visitors.

Paris Saint-Germain (1 November 2016)

The return game was played two weeks later at the St. Jakob-Park with an attendance of 30,852 fans. Omar Gaber played his Champions League debut for the home team. PSG found better into the game and they had the early goal chances, but these were not enough to beat keeper Tomáš Vaclík. After about 20 minutes Basel got into the match better, getting support up for their sole striker Seydou Doumbia. But Paris struck with impeccable timing as half-time approached. A corner was not properly cleared and Thomas Meunier pounced onto the loose ball, driving a fierce shot at goal through the crowd of bodies gathered in the middle. One of those was the unmarked Blaise Matuidi who, probably unintentionally, flicked the ball into the net in the 43rd minute. After the half-time break Basel searched for their chances but had no luck. Just as it looked like a goal would not come from anywhere for Basel, it came practically out of nowhere. Substitute Luca Zuffi took aim from almost 40 metres out and suddenly everything had the desired impact. The substitute way out on the by-line tried to pick out Marc Janko in the area with a cross, but instead he drifted a ball in that sailed over goalkeeper Alphonse Areola and into the net (76 minutes). In the 84th minute Serey Dié received a second yellow card and was dismissed. Despite this, only two minutes later Janko had the best chance for a winner for Basel but he missed the crossed ball. Thomas Meunier, however, scored that for Paris in the last minute of the game.

Ludogorets Razgrad (23 November 2016)

The return game against Ludogorets Razgrad was played in Vasil Levski National Stadium in Sofia, because their regular stadium, Ludogorets Arena, Razgrad does not reach UEFA requirements. Basel fielded their strongest team, but Ludogorets had to withdraw midfielder Marcelinho with a hamstring injury. Ludogrets had 55% ball possession, but Basel created the most and the better chances. Goalkeeper Vladislav Stoyanov made several fine stops to keep Basel at bay. However, the game ended goalless and both teams collected their second point in the group stage. Basel coach Urs Fischer said after the match; "We gave our best, we had a good game, but we failed to convert our chances. There is one more game left, but it could have been much better if we had won tonight. We tried everything, I played with all my forwards, but that was not enough, unfortunately."

Arsenal (6 December 2016)

The situation before this last group stage match was clear, Basel had to obtain more points than Ludogorets Razgrad to qualify for the Europa League knock out stage and Arsenal had to obtain more points than Paris Saint-Germain to win the group. Two former Basel players were in the Arsenal team, Mohamed Elneny and Granit Xhaka whose elder brother Taulant lined up for the home team. The game was decided early, two defending mistakes soon after the kick-off gave Arsenal two goal scoring chances. Both of which were taken with ease and the visitors were leading by two goals after just quarter of an hour. Lucas Pérez's hat-trick in the 47th minute inspired Arsenal to a 4–1 triumph, with Alex Iwobi adding the fourth goal after 53 minutes. Basel substitute Seydou Doumbia managed a fine consolation goal for hosts, but this came on 78 minutes and was too late to make any change in the result. Paris's 2–2 draw with Ludogorets meant Arsenal win Group A, Basel finished bottom and were eliminated from the European competitions.

Conclusion

In advance of the group stage it was clear that Basel's two games against Ludogorets would be their most important games in the group stage, considering their realistic objective of finishing third. With only a draw at home on matchday 1, things started disappointingly. The away tie against Arsenal was decided early in the game. The away game against Paris Saint-Germain can be written off as unlucky because of the woodwork. Matchday 4 against PSG was a close affair and can also written off as unlucky because the deciding penalty goal came in added time. The goalless draw with Ludogorets on matchday 5 must be described as ineffective and helpless. The final game against Arsenal was a clear defeat. Basel missed not only their initial aim of remaining in the competition after the group stage, but they also missed their minimum aim for third position and the transfer to the Europa League knockout phase.

== Players ==
=== First team squad ===
The following is the list of the Basel first team squad. It also includes players that were in the squad the day the season started on 23 July but subsequently left the club after that date.

As of 23 July 2016

Note: Flags indicate national team as defined under FIFA eligibility rules; some limited exceptions apply. Players may hold more than one non-FIFA nationality.

No.	Pos.	Nation	Player
1	GK	CZE	Tomáš Vaclík
3	DF	CIV	Adama Traoré
4	DF	EGY	Omar Gaber
5	DF	SUI	Michael Lang
6	MF	CIV	Serey Die
7	MF	SUI	Luca Zuffi
8	MF	ISL	Birkir Bjarnason
9	FW	SLO	Andraž Šporar
10	MF	ARG	Matías Delgado (Captain)
11	MF	SUI	Renato Steffen
13	GK	SRB	Đorđe Nikolić
15	MF	SWE	Alexander Fransson
16	DF	SUI	Manuel Akanji
17	DF	CZE	Marek Suchý (vice-captain)

No.	Pos.	Nation	Player
18	GK	SUI	Germano Vailati
20	MF	SUI	Dereck Kutesa
21	FW	AUT	Marc Janko
23	DF	COL	Éder Álvarez Balanta
24	FW	NOR	Mohamed Elyounoussi
25	DF	PAR	Blás Riveros
26	DF	DEN	Daniel Høegh
29	MF	SUI	Charles Pickel
30	DF	SUI	Eray Cümart
33	FW	SUI	Kevin Bua
34	MF	ALB	Taulant Xhaka
35	FW	SUI	Nicolas Hunziker
39	MF	SUI	Davide Callà
77	FW	NED	Jean-Paul Boëtius
88	FW	CIV	Seydou Doumbia

=== Loans ===
==== In on loan ====
88	FW	CIV	Seydou Doumbia (on loan from Roma until 30 June 2017)

==== Out on loan ====
30	MF	SUI	Cedric Itten (on loan at Luzern until 30 June 2017)
22	MF	SRB	Zdravko Kuzmanović (on loan at Málaga until 30 June 2017)
23	GK	SUI	Mirko Salvi (on loan at Lugano until 30 June 2017)
20	MF	SRB	Veljko Simić (on loan at Chiasso from 26 July 2016 until 30 June 2017)
35	FW	SUI	Nicolas Hunziker (on loan at Grasshopper Zürich until 30 June 2017)
77	FW	NED	Jean-Paul Boëtius (on loan at K.R.C. Genk from 31 January until 30 June 2017)
30	DF	SUI	Eray Cümart (on loan at Lugano from 8 March until 30 June 2017)

=== Transfers summer 2016 ===
==== In ====
4	DF	EGY	Omar Gaber (from Zamalek)
6	MF	CIV	Serey Die (from VfB Stuttgart)
13	GK	SRB	Đorđe Nikolić (from Jagodina)
23	DF	COL	Éder Álvarez Balanta (from River Plate)
24	FW	NOR	Mohamed Elyounoussi (from Molde)
25	DF	PAR	Blás Riveros (from Olimpia Asunción)
33	FW	SUI	Kevin Bua (from Zürich)

==== Out ====
4	DF	SUI	Philipp Degen (end of career)
6	DF	ARG	Walter Samuel (end of career)
19	DF	SWE	Behrang Safari (to Malmö FF free transfer)
24	FW	EGY	Ahmed Hamoudi (contract resolved)
27	DF	ALB	Naser Aliji (to Kaiserslautern)
36	FW	SUI	Breel Embolo (to Schalke 04 for reportedly €25m)

=== Transfers winter 2016–17 ===
==== Out ====
8	MF	ISL	Birkir Bjarnason (to Aston Villa)
29	MF	SUI	Charles Pickel (to Grasshopper Club)

== Results and fixtures ==
Kickoff times are in CET

=== Legend ===
Win Draw Loss Postponed

=== Friendly matches ===
==== Pre- and mid-season ====
25 June 2016 Pre-season	Basel	2–4	St. Gallen	Langensteinstadion, Waldshut-Tiengen
15:30	Callà 32' (1:1); Traoré (yellow card) 27' (yellow-red card) 62'; Manzambi 71' (2:3)	FCB summary	29' (0:1) Tafer; (yellow card) 37' Hefti; 42' (1:2) Bunjaku; 47' (1:3) Aleksić; (yellow card) 86' Mutsch; 90+2' (2:4) Chabbi	Attendance: 400; Referee: Robert Kempter

1 July 2015 Pre-season	1860 München	1–1	FC Basel	Isarau Stadium Geretsried (Germany)
20:00	83' (1:1) Mölders; (yellow card) 86' Mölders	FCB summary	66' (1:0) Høegh; (yellow card) 88' Callà	Attendance: 1,100; Referee: Robert Hartmann

8 July 2016 Pre-season	Basel	2–3	Lausanne-Sport	Youth Campus Basel, Münchenstein
18:30	Cümart 4' (1:0); Elyounoussi 49' (2:1)	FCB summary	46' (1:1) Carlos Henrique; 58' (2:2) Margairaz; 59' Araz; (yellow card) 87' Carlos Henrique	Attendance: 1,000; Referee: Adrien Jaccottet (Basel)

13 July 2016 Pre-season	Basel	1–4	Zenit Saint Petersburg	Stade St-Germain, Savièse
19:00	Callà 69' (1:2)	FCB summary	15' (pen. 0:1) Dzyuba; 35' (0:2) García; (yellow card) 54' Ryazantsev; 75' (1:3) Ryazantsev; 90' (pen. 1:4) Kerzhakov	Attendance: 300; Referee: Lukas Fähndrich

16 July 2016 Pre-season	Basel	0–1	AS Monaco	Stade de Chailly, Montreux
15:00		FCB summary	33' (0:1) Boschilia	Attendance: 700; Referee: Sébastien Pache
Note: Fair game, no yellow cards

19 July 2016 Pre-season	Basel	3–3	VfL Wolfsburg	St. Jakob-Park, Basel
18:30	Janko 69' (1:2); Høegh 72' (2:2); Elyounoussi 82' (3:3); Janko (yellow card) 88'	FCB summary	29' (0:1) Dost; 55' (0:2) Kruse; 74' (2:3) Brekalo; (yellow card) 88' Möbius; (yellow card) 88' Guilavogui	Attendance: 7,619; Referee: Adrien Jaccottet (Basel)

31 August 2016 Mid-season	Basel	2–3	FC Wohlen	Nachwuchs-Campus, Basel
16:30	Šporar 12' (1:0); Ambre Nsumbu 36' (2:0)	FCB summary	56' (pen. 2:1) Schultz; 85' (2:2) Marvin Graf; 89' (2:3) Yannick Schmid	Attendance: 350; Referee: Urs Schnyder
Note: Fair game, no yellow cards

==== Winter break ====
10 January 2017 Winter break friendly	Basel	2–1	Le Mont	Youth Campus Basel, Münchenstein
16:00	Šporar 44' (1:1); Manzambi 90+1' (2:1)	FCB summary	14' (0:1) Touré	Attendance: 100; Referee: Adrien Jaccottet (Basel)
Note: Fair game, no yellow cards

14 January 2017 Training camp	Basel	1–2	St. Pauli	Marbella Football Center, San Pedro de Alcántara
17:00	Steffen 13' (1:0)	FCB summary	44' (1:1) Flum; 87' Gonther	Attendance: 150; Referee: Moreno Munoz
Note: Fair game, no yellow cards

19 January 2017 Training camp	Basel	2–1	Lokomotiv Moscow	Marbella Football Center, San Pedro de Alcántara
16:00	Janko 32' (1:1); Manzambi (yellow card) 70'; Šporar 85' (2:1)	FCB summary	(yellow card) 18' Miranchuk; (red card) 35' Mykhalyk; 60' Galadzhan	Attendance: 150; Referee: José Maria Sánchez

25 January 2017 Winter break	Basel	2–0	Chiasso	Youth Campus Basel, Münchenstein
15:00	Bua 52' (1:0); Manzambi 85' (2:0)	FCB summary		Attendance: 200; Referee: Stephan Klossner
Note: Fair game, no yellow cards

28 January 2017 Friendly	Basel	1–0	Esbjerg fB	Youth Campus Basel, Münchenstein
14:30	Elyounoussi 13' (1:0)	FCB summary		Attendance: 500; Referee: Adrien Jaccottet (Basel)
Note: Fair game, no yellow cards

=== Swiss Super League ===
==== First half of season ====
24 July 2016 Round 1	Basel	3–0	Sion	St. Jakob-Park, Basel
16:00	Suchý (yellow card) 9'; Delgado 37' (pen. 1:0); Doumbia 44' (2:0); Delgado 57' (3:0)	FCB summary	(yellow card) 37' Konaté; (yellow card) 83' Ziegler; (yellow card) 88' Lacroix	Attendance: 27,924; Referee: (Switzerland) Stephan Klossner

31 July 2016 Round 2	Vaduz	1–5	Basel	Rheinpark Stadion, Vaduz
13:45	Grippo (yellow card) 19'; Grippo 31' (1:2); Strohmaier (yellow card) 25'	FCB summary	4' (0:1) Janko; 19' (pen. 0:2) Delgado; (yellow card) 40' Balanta; 42' (1:3) Elyounoussi; 89' (1:4) Steffen; 90+1' (1:5) Doumbia	Attendance: 5,680; Referee: (Switzerland) Adrien Jaccottet (Basel)

7 August 2016 Round 3	Luzern	2–3	Basel	Swissporarena, Luzern
13:45	Hyka 18' (1:1); Hyka 29' (2:1); Kryeziu (yellow card) 33'	FCB summary	4' (0:1) Suchý; (yellow card) 20' Xhaka; 70' (2:2) Janko; 74' (2:3) Janko	Attendance: 14,486; Referee: (Switzerland) Fedayi San (Gebenstorf)

10 August 2016 Round 4	Basel	3–0	Young Boys	St. Jakob-Park, Basel
20:30	Traoré (yellow card) 35'; Zuffi 55' (1:0); Bjarnason 59' (2:0); Vilotić 71' (o.g. 3:0)	FCB summary	(yellow card) 88' Bertone	Attendance: 29,523; Referee: (Switzerland) Alain Bieri (Solothurn)

20 August 2016 Round 5	Basel	4–1	Lugano	St. Jakob-Park, Basel
20:00	Xhaka (yellow card) 19'; Balanta (yellow card) 37'; Suchý 45' (1:0); Steffen 48' (2:0); Doumbia 53' (3:0); Lang 60' (4:0); Delgado (yellow card) 80'	FCB summary	66' (4:1) Rosseti; (yellow card) 88' Golemić	Attendance: 26,012; Referee: (Switzerland) Pascal Erlachner

28 August 2016 Round 6	Thun	0–3	Basel	Stockhorn Arena, Thun
16:00	Bürki (yellow card) 33'; Sorgić (yellow card) 82'	FCB summary	4' (0:1) Lang; 13' (0:2) Janko; 19' (0:3) Zuffi; (yellow card) 78' Callà	Attendance: 5,793; Referee: (Switzerland) Sébastien Pache

10 September 2016 Round 7	Basel	3–1	Grasshopper Club	St. Jakob-Park, Basel
20:00	Bjarnason 29' (1:0); Doumbia 31' (2:0); Doumbia 86' (3:1)	FCB summary	45+1' Sigurjónsson; (yellow card) 57' Bamert	Attendance: 28,825; Referee: (Switzerland) Stephan Studer

21 September 2016 Round 8	Lausanne-Sport	1–2	Basel	Olympique de la Pontaise, Lausanne
20:30	Margiotta 36' (1:0); Margiotta (yellow card) 48'; Margairaz (red card) 90'	FCB summary	67' (1:1) Bjarnason; (yellow card) 73' Balanta; 90+3' (1:2) Balanta	Attendance: 6.154; Referee: (Switzerland) Adrien Jaccottet

24 September 2016 Round 9	St. Gallen	1–3	Basel	kybunpark, St. Gallen
20:00	Toko (yellow card) 1'; Aratore 14' (1:0); Haggui (yellow card) 77'; Gelmi (yellow card) 89'	FCB summary	26' (1:1) Delgado; (yellow card) 33' Traoré; (yellow card) 55' Callà; 76' (o.g. 1:2) Gelmi; 90' (pen. 1:3) Doumbia	Attendance: 14,257; Referee: (Switzerland) Stephan Klossner

1 October 2016 Round 10	Basel	1–1	Thun	St. Jakob-Park, Basel
20:00	Callà 90' (1:1)	FCB summary	35' (0:1) Tosetti; (yellow card) 44' Hediger; (yellow card) 56' Faivre; (yellow card) 92' Facchinetti	Attendance: 26,942; Referee: (Switzerland) Fedayi San (Gebenstorf)

15 October 2016 Round 11	Basel	3–0	Luzern	St. Jakob-Park, Basel
20:00	Doumbia 25' (1:0); Lang 55' (2:0); Elyounoussi 89' (3:0)	FCB summary	(yellow card) 68' Lustenberger	Attendance: 27,261; Referee: (Switzerland) Stephan Klossner

22 October 2016 Round 12	Lugano	2–2	Basel	Cornaredo, Lugano
20:00	Aguirre (yellow card) 38'; Mariani 63' (1:1); Alioski 75' (pen. 2:1); Salivi (yellow card) 85'; Jozinović (yellow card) 90+2'	FCB summary	51' (0:1) Delgado; 88' (pen. 2:2) Callà; (yellow card) 90+2' Callà	Attendance: 4,406; Referee: (Switzerland) Lukas Fähndrich

29 October 2016 Round 13	Grasshopper Club	0–2	Basel	Letzigrund, Zürich
20:00	Bašić (yellow card) 6'; Källström (yellow card) 86'	FCB summary	17' (0:1) Delgado; (yellow card) 20' Lang; 21' (pen. 0:2) Delgado	Attendance: 7,000; Referee: (Switzerland) Sandro Schärer

5 November 2016 Round 14	Basel	2–1	Lausanne-Sport	St. Jakob-Park, Basel
20:00	Xhaka (yellow card) 41'; Suchý 90+1' (1:1); Janko 90+3' (2:1)	FCB summary	(yellow card) 8' Gétaz; 42' (0:1) Margiotta; (yellow card) 86' Monteiro	Attendance: 25,372; Referee: (Switzerland) Urs Schnyder

19 November 2016 Round 15	Basel	6–0	Vaduz	St. Jakob-Park, Basel
20:00	Doumbia 10' (1:0); Elyounoussi 19' (2:0); Doumbia 51' (3:0); Lang 74' (4:0); Bjarnason 77' (5:0); Callà 90' (6:0)	FCB summary	(yellow card) 3' Muntwiler	Attendance: 24,846; Referee: (Switzerland) Adrien Jaccottet (Basel)

27 November 2016 Round 16	Sion	1–2	Basel	Stade Tourbillon, Sion
16:00	Salatić (yellow card) 19'; Sierro (yellow card) 52'; Karlen 72' (1:1)	FCB summary	34' (0:1) Delgado; (yellow card) 50' Steffen; (yellow card) 70' Serey Die; 77' (1:2) Janko; (yellow card) 52' (yellow-red card) 89' Janko	Attendance: 13,200; Referee: (Switzerland) Nikolaj Hänni (Gams SG)

3 December 2016 Round 17	Young Boys	3–1	Basel	Stade de Suisse, Bern
20:00	Hoarau 6' (1:0); Nuhu (red card) 45'; Hoarau 51' (2:0); Mbabu 71' (3:1)	FCB summary	66' (pen. 2:1) Delgado	Attendance: 20,216; Referee: (Austria) Harald Lechner

10 December 2016 Round 18	Basel	1–0	St. Gallen	St. Jakob-Park, Basel
20:00	Janko 48' (1:0); Xhaka (yellow card) 57'	FCB summary	(yellow card) 42' Al. Ajeti; (yellow card) 55' Buess	Attendance: 26,242; Referee: (Switzerland) Pascal Erlachner

==== Second half of season ====
4 February 2017 Round 19	Basel	4–0	Lugano	St. Jakob-Park, Basel
20:00	Elyounoussi 2' (1:0); Elyounoussi 23' (2:0); Elyounoussi 36' (3:0); Balanta (yellow card) 45'; Janko 85' (4:0)	FCB summary	(yellow card) 11' Alioski	Attendance: 23,439; Referee: (Switzerland) Fedayi San (Gebenstorf)

11 February 2017 Round 20	Thun	0–2	Basel	Stockhorn Arena, Thun
17:45	Schindelholz (yellow card) 29'; Facchinetti (yellow card) 34'; Rapp (yellow card) 56'	FCB summary	(yellow card) 73' Xhaka; (yellow card) 74' Elyounoussi; 79' (o.g. 0:1) Schindelholz; (yellow card) 90+2' Vaclík; 90+3' (0:2) Doumbia	Attendance: 5,707; Referee: (Switzerland) Lukas Fähndrich

19 February 2017 Round 21	Basel	4–3	Lausanne-Sport	St. Jakob-Park, Basel
13:45	Doumbia 11' (1:1); Doumbia 71' (2:3); Akanji 74' (3:3); Janko 84' (4:3)	FCB summary	68' (pen. 1:3) Kololli; (yellow card) 15' Gétaz; 39' (1:2) Campo; 68' (pen. 1:3) Kololli	Attendance: 23,974; Referee: (Switzerland) Sascha Amhof

26 February 2017 Round 22	Basel	3–1	Luzern	St. Jakob-Park, Basel
13:45	Suchý 19' (1:0); Janko 34' (2:0); Steffen (yellow card) 67'; Janko 81' (3:1)	FCB summary	(yellow card) 19' Grether; 36' (2:1) Affolter; (yellow card) 75' Neumayr; (yellow card) 76' Itten	Attendance: 24,894; Referee: (Switzerland) Nikolaj Hänni (Gams SG)

5 March 2017 Round 23	Vaduz	1–1	Basel	Rheinpark Stadion, Vaduz
13:45	Avdijaj 31' (1:1); Muntwiler (yellow card) 59'; Bühler (yellow card) 83'	FCB summary	27' (0:1) Zuffi; (yellow card) 90+2' Doumbia	Attendance: 4,345; Referee: (Switzerland) Lionel Tschudi

12 March 2017 Round 24	Sion	0–1	Basel	Stade Tourbillon, Sion
16:00	Konaté (yellow card) 61'	FCB summary	(yellow card) 48' Traoré; 55' (0:1) Lang	Attendance: 12,300; Referee: (Austria) Dominik Ouschan

18 March 2017 Round 25	Basel	1–0	Grasshopper Club	St. Jakob-Park, Basel
20:00	Zuffi 6' (1:0); Xhaka (yellow card) 89'	FCB summary	(yellow card) 27' Dabbur; (yellow card) 57' Lavanchy	Attendance: 26,027; Referee: (Switzerland) Stephan Klossner

1 April 2017 Round 26	St. Gallen	0–3	Basel	AFG Arena, St. Gallen
20:00	Barnetta (yellow card) 58'	FCB summary	7' (0:1) Akanji; 20' (0:2) Janko; (yellow card) 27' Steffen; (yellow card) 41' Riveros; 55' (0:2) Akanji	Attendance: 18,509; Referee: (Poland) Daniel Stefanski

9 April 2017 Round 27	Basel	1–1	Young Boys	St. Jakob-Park, Basel
16:00	Xhaka (yellow card) 24'; Elyounoussi 54' (1:1); Riveros (yellow card) 75'; Akanji (yellow card) 90'	FCB summary	18' (0:1) Ravet; (yellow card) 51' Frey; (red card) 75' Assalé	Attendance: 30,817; Referee: (Switzerland) Alain Bieri (Solothurn)

15 April 2017 Round 28	Lausanne-Sport	0–4	Basel	Olympique de la Pontaise, Lausanne
20:00		FCB summary	37' (0:1) Lang; 40' (0:1)Elyounoussi; (yellow card) 45' Steffen; 59' (0:3) Šporar; 82' (0:4) Elyounoussi	Attendance: 5,855; Referee: (Switzerland) Urs Schnyder

22 April 2017 Round 29	Basel	2–2	Vaduz	St. Jakob-Park, Basel
20:00	Suchý (yellow card) 39'; Delgado 41' (1:1); Elyounoussi (yellow card) 63'; Janko (yellow card) 86'; Doumbia 90+2' (2:2)	FCB summary	11' (0:1) Brunner; (yellow card) 60' Borgmann; 78' (1:2) Kukuruzović	Attendance: 23,999; Referee: (Switzerland) Adrien Jaccottet (Basel)

28 April 2017 Round 30	Luzern	1–2	Basel	Swissporarena, Luzern
19:45	Costa (yellow card) 41'; M. Schneuwly 88' (1:2)	FCB summary	3' (0:1) Doumbia; (yellow card) 36' Traoré; 71' (0:2) Steffen; (yellow card) 76' Suchý	Attendance: 14,823; Referee: (Switzerland) Fedayi San (Gebenstorf)

7 May 2017 Round 31	Lugano	2–2	Basel	Cornaredo, Lugano
13:45	Alioski 60' (pen. 1:2); Sadiku 79' (2:2); Sadiku (yellow card) 78' (yellow-red card) 80'	FCB summary	12' (0:1) Fransson; 54' (0:2) Zuffi; (yellow card) 56' Zuffi; (yellow card) 68' Callà	Attendance: 6,151; Referee: (Switzerland) Sandro Schärer

14 May 2017 Round 32	Basel	3–3	Thun	St. Jakob-Park, Basel
13:45	Steffen (yellow card) 20'; Steffen 24' (1:1); Janko (yellow card) 45'; Elyounoussi 76' (2:2); Serey Die (yellow card) 79'; Suchý (yellow card) 86'; Serey Die 90' (3:2)	FCB summary	17' (0:1) Sorgić; 64' (1:2) Sorgić; (yellow card) 68' Tosetti; (yellow card) 86' Facchinetti; 90+4' (3:2) Sorgić	Attendance: 26,844; Referee: (Switzerland) Lukas Fähndrich
Note: Debut for Neftali Manzambi

18 May 2017 Round 33	Basel	2–2	Sion	St. Jakob-Park, Basel
19:45	Janko 33' (1:0); Doumbia 89' (2:1)	FCB summary	39' (1:1) Akolo; (yellow card) 63' Konaté; (yellow card) 72' Akolo; (yellow card) 73' Bia; (yellow card) 84' Maceiras; 90+4' (2:2) Constant	Attendance: 23,339; Referee: (Austria) Markus Hameter

21 May 2017 Round 34	Young Boys	2–1	Basel	Stade de Suisse, Bern
16:00	Assalé 9' (1:1); Schick 53' (2:1)	FCB summary	3' (0:1) Doumbia	Attendance: 18,383; Referee: (Switzerland) Sascha Amhof
Note: Fair game no yellow cards

28 May 2017 Round 35	Grasshopper Club	1–3	Basel	Letzigrund, Zürich
16:00	Sigurjónsson (yellow card) 21'; Caio 64' (1:1); Caio (yellow card) 65'	FCB summary	42' (0:1) Akanji; 86' (1:2) Doumbia; 88' (1:3) Doumbia	Attendance: 7,000; Referee: (Switzerland) Nikolaj Hänni (Gams SG)

2 June 2017 Round 36	Basel	4–1	St. Gallen	St. Jakob-Park, Basel
20:30	Doumbia 14' (1:0); Steffen 58' (2:1); Doumbia 87' (3:1); Janko 90+1' (4:1)	FCB summary	26' (1:1) Danijel Aleksić	Attendance: 30,657; Referee: (Switzerland) Fedayi San (Gebenstorf)
Note: Fair game no yellow cards

==== League table ====
Pos	Team	Pld	W	D	L	GF	GA	GD	Pts	Qualification or relegation
1	Basel (C)	36	26	8	2	92	35	+57	86	Qualification for the Champions League group stage
2	Young Boys	36	20	9	7	72	44	+28	69	Qualification for the Champions League third qualifying round
3	Lugano	36	15	8	13	52	61	−9	53	Qualification for the Europa League group stage (Note: Since the winners of the 2016–17 Swiss Cup, Basel, qualified for European competition based on league position, the spot awarded to the Swiss Cup winners (Europa League group stage) was passed to the third-placed team, the spot awarded to the third-placed team was passed to the fourth-placed team, and the spot awarded to the fourth-placed team was passed to the fifth-placed team.)
4	Sion	36	15	6	15	60	55	+5	51	Qualification for the Europa League third qualifying round
5	Luzern	36	14	8	14	62	66	−4	50	Qualification for the Europa League second qualifying round
6	Thun	36	11	12	13	58	63	−5	45	
7	St. Gallen	36	11	8	17	43	57	−14	41	
8	Grasshopper	36	10	8	18	47	61	−14	38	
9	Lausanne-Sport	36	9	8	19	51	62	−11	35	
10	Vaduz (R)	36	7	9	20	45	78	−33	30	Relegation to Challenge League; Qualification for the Europa League first qualifying round (Note: Vaduz qualified for the UEFA Europa League first qualifying round by winning the 2016–17 Liechtenstein Cup.)

Source: RSSSF, Soccerway
Rules for classification: 1) Points; 2) Goal difference; 3) Goals scored; 4) Head-to-head points; 5) Draw.
(C) Champions; (R) Relegated

=== Swiss Cup ===
The draw for the first round was held on 1 July 2016. The Super- and Challenge League clubs were seeded and could not be drawn against each other. The lower division teams were granted home advantage and Basel were therefore drawn away, in Rapperswil. The home advantage was also granted to the team from the lower league in the second and third rounds.

14 August 2016 Round 1	Rapperswil-Jona	0–1	Basel	Stadion Grünfeld, Rapperswil
15:30	Polverino (yellow card) 72'; Kllokoqi (yellow card) 72'; Teixeira (yellow card) 85'	FCB summary ASF/SFV summary	58' Boëtius; (yellow card) 82' Suchý	Attendance: 4,350 (Stadium record); Referee: (Switzerland) Urs Schnyder

18 September 2016 Round 2	Zug 94	0–1	Basel	Herti Allmend Stadion, Zug
15:30	Florim Mani (yellow card) 48'; Erick Ntsika (yellow card) 90+2' (yellow-red card) 90+4'	FCB summary ASF/SFV summary	45' Høegh	Attendance: 4,200; Referee: (Switzerland) Fedayi San (Gebenstorf)

26 October 2016 Round 3	Tuggen	1–4	Basel	Linthstrasse, Tuggen
19:30	Zverotic (yellow card) 37'; Erzan Murtisi (yellow card) 38'; Dominik Schiendorfer (yellow card) 45+1'; Jusuf Shala 90' (1:4)	FCB summary ASF/SFV summary	8' (0:1) Boëtius; 16' (pen. 0:2) Boëtius; 35' (0:3) Lang; 44' (0:4) Balanta	Attendance: 4,150; Referee: (Switzerland) Sascha Amhof

2 March 2017 Quarterfinal	Basel	3–1	Zürich	St. Jakob-Park, Basel
20:30	Steffen (yellow card) 8'; Janko 20' (1:1); Lang 41' (2:1); Xhaka (yellow card) 28' (yellow-red card) 56'; Steffen 78' (3:1)	FCB summary ASF/SFV summary	3' (0:1) Buff; (yellow card) 14' Nef; (yellow card) 15' Brunner; (yellow card) 58' Voser; (yellow card) 82' Schönbächler	Attendance: 25,259; Referee: (Switzerland) Alain Bieri (Solothurn)

5 April 2017 Semifinal	Winterthur	1–3	Basel	Schützenwiese, Winterthur
18:45	Gazzetta (yellow card) 24'; Cani 88' (1:2); Hebib (yellow card) 89'	FCB summary ASF/SFV summary	54' (pen. 0:1) Delgado; (yellow card) 56' Janko; 85' (0:2) Akanji; 90+4' (1:3) Fransson	Attendance: 9,400; Referee: (Switzerland) Sascha Amhof

Final 25 May 2017
16:00
Final

FC Basel	3–0	Sion
Doumbia (yellow card) 44'; Delgado 47' (1:0); Traoré 62' (2:0); Lang (yellow card) 77'; Lang 89' (3:0); Xhaka (yellow card) 79'	FCB summary ASF/SFV summary)	(yellow card) 37' Salatic; (yellow card) 90+5' Lüchinger

Stade de Genève, Lancy
Attendance: 26,500
Referee: (Switzerland) Stephan Klossner

Teams

GK	(Czech Republic) Tomáš Vaclík
DF	(Switzerland) Michael Lang
DF	(Czech Republic) Marek Suchý
DF	(Switzerland) Manuel Akanji
DF	(Ivory Coast) Adama Traoré
MF	(Albania) Taulant Xhaka
MF	(Switzerland) Luca Zuffi	(substituted off) 90+3'
MF	(Norway) Mohamed Elyounoussi
MF	(Argentina) Matías Delgado (cap)	(substituted off) 81'
MF	(Switzerland) Renato Steffen
ST	(Ivory Coast) Seydou Doumbia	(substituted off) 88'
Substitutes:
MF	(Ivory Coast) Serey Die	(substituted on) 81'
ST	(Austria) Marc Janko	(substituted on) 88'
MF	(Sweden) Alexander Fransson	(substituted on) 90+3'
Manager:
(Switzerland) Urs Fischer

GK	(Russia) Anton Mitryushkin
DF	(Switzerland) Nicolas Lüchinger
DF	(Montenegro) Elsad Zverotić (cap)
DF	(Switzerland) Reto Ziegler
DF	(The Gambia) Pa Modou Jagne	(substituted off) 63'
MF	(Switzerland) Gregory Karlen	(substituted off) 70'
MF	(Switzerland) Vero Salatić
MF	(Guinea) Kévin Constant
ST	(Democratic Republic of the Congo) Chadrac Akolo	(substituted off) 79'
ST	(Senegal) Moussa Konaté
ST	(Angola) Joaquim Adão
Substitutes:
MF	(Portugal) Carlitos	(substituted on) 63'
MF	(Belgium) Geoffrey Mujangi Bia	(substituted on) 70'
MF	(Brazil) Léo Itaperuna	(substituted on) 79'
Manager:
(Switzerland) Sébastien Fournier

=== UEFA Champions League ===
==== Group stage ====
Basel were qualified for the 2016–17 UEFA Champions League in the Group stage. The draw was held on 25 August 2016, at the Grimaldi Forum in Monaco. Basel were drawn into Group A along with Paris Saint-Germain, Arsenal and Ludogorets Razgrad. The first match was at home game against Razgrad.

Matches

13 September 2016 Round 1	Basel (Switzerland)	1–1	(Bulgaria) Ludogorets Razgrad	St. Jakob-Park, Basel
20:45	Steffen (yellow card) 65'; Steffen 80' (1:1)	UEFA report FCB summary	45' (0:1) Cafu; (yellow card) 67' Wanderson; (yellow card) 77' Natanael	Attendance: 30,852; Referee: (Belarus) Aleksei Kulbakov

28 September 2016 Round 2	Arsenal (England)	2–0	(Switzerland) Basel	Emirates Stadium, London
20:45	Walcott 7' (1:0); Walcott 26' (2:0)	UEFA report FCB summary	(yellow card) 21' Suchý; (yellow card) 85' Elyounoussi	Attendance: 59,993; Referee: Danny Makkelie (Netherlands)

19 October 2016 Round 3	Paris Saint-Germain (France)	3–0	(Switzerland) Basel	Parc des Princes, Paris
20:45	Di María 40' (1:0); Lucas 62' (2:0); Rabiot (yellow card) 64'; Cavani 90+3' (pen. 3:0)	UEFA report FCB summary	(yellow card) 66' Steffen; (yellow card) 76' Lang	Attendance: 46,488; Referee: Deniz Aytekin (Germany)

1 November 2016 Round 4	Basel (Switzerland)	1–2	(France) Paris Saint-Germain	St. Jakob-Park, Basel
20:45	Steffen (yellow card) 45+2'; Zuffi 76' (1:1); Serey Die (yellow card) 77' (yellow-red card) 85'	UEFA report FCB summary	43' (0:1) Matuidi; (yellow card) 86' Verratti; (yellow card) 88' Kurzawa; 90' (1:2) Meunier	Attendance: 34,639; Referee: Ovidiu Hațegan (Romania)

23 November 2016 Round 5	Ludogorets Razgrad (Bulgaria)	0–0	(Switzerland) Basel	Vasil Levski National Stadium, Sofia
20:45	Xhaka (yellow card) 63'; Suchý (yellow card) 81'; Traoré (yellow card) 87'	UEFA report FCB summary	(yellow card) 40' Anicet Abel; (yellow card) 91' Cicinho	Attendance: 20,821; Referee: Martin Atkinson (England)

6 December 2016 Round 6	Basel (Switzerland)	1–4	(England) Arsenal	St. Jakob-Park, Basel
20:45	Balanta (yellow card) 66'; Doumbia 78' (1:4)	UEFA report FCB summary	8' (0:1) Pérez; 16' (0:2) Pérez; 47' (0:3) Pérez; (yellow card) 36' Gibbs; 53' (0:4) Iwobi	Attendance: 36,000; Referee: Jorge Sousa (Portugal)

Notes

1. Ludogorets Razgrad play their home matches at Vasil Levski National Stadium, Sofia instead of their regular stadium, Ludogorets Arena, Razgrad.

Final group table

Pos	Team	Pld	W	D	L	GF	GA	GD	Pts	Qualification	ARS	PAR	LUD	BSL
1	(England) Arsenal	6	4	2	0	18	6	+12	14	Advance to knockout phase	—	2–2	6–0	2–0
2	(France) Paris Saint-Germain	6	3	3	0	13	7	+6	12	Advance to knockout phase	1–1	—	2–2	3–0
3	(Bulgaria) Ludogorets Razgrad	6	0	3	3	6	15	−9	3	Transfer to Europa League	2–3	1–3	—	0–0
4	(Switzerland) Basel	6	0	2	4	3	12	−9	2		1–4	1–2	1–1	—

Source: UEFA

== See also ==
- History of FC Basel
- List of FC Basel players
- List of FC Basel seasons

== Sources ==
- Rotblau: Jahrbuch Saison 2017/2018. Publisher: FC Basel Marketing AG. ISBN 978-3-7245-2189-1
- Die ersten 125 Jahre / 2018. Publisher: Josef Zindel im Friedrich Reinhardt Verlag, Basel. ISBN 978-3-7245-2305-5
- Season 2016–17 at "Basler Fussballarchiv” homepage
- Switzerland 2016–17 at RSSSF
