= 2016–17 Swiss Cup =

Tournament details
- Country: Switzerland
- Teams: 64

Final positions
- Champions: FC Basel
- Runners-up: FC Sion

Tournament statistics
- Top goal scorer: Anđelko Savić (FC Luzern) (7)

The 2016–17 Swiss Cup was the 92nd season of Switzerland's annual football cup competition. The competition commenced on 13 August 2016 with the first games of Round 1 and concluded on 25 May 2017 with the Final. The winner of the competition was FC Basel.

== Participating clubs ==
All teams from 2015–16 Super League and 2015–16 Challenge League as well as the top 4 teams from 2015–16 Promotion League automatically entered this year's competition. The remaining 41 teams had to qualify through separate qualifying rounds within their leagues. Reserve teams and teams from Liechtenstein are not allowed in the competition, the latter only enter the 2016–17 Liechtenstein Cup.

**2016–17 Super League**; 9 teams	**2016–17 Challenge League**; 10 teams	**2016–17 Promotion League**; 9 teams	**2016–17 1. Liga**; 13 teams	**2016–17 2. Liga Interregional**; 9 teams	**2016–17 Regional leagues** 14 teams
**FC Basel** (BS); Grasshopper Club (ZH); FC Lausanne-Sport (VD); FC Lugano (TI); **FC Luzern** (LU); **FC Sion** (VS); FC St. Gallen (SG); FC Thun (BE); BSC Young Boys (BE)	FC Aarau (AG); FC Chiasso (TI); FC Le Mont (VD); Neuchâtel Xamax FCS (NE); FC Schaffhausen (SH); Servette FC (GE); FC Wil (SG); **FC Winterthur** (ZH); FC Wohlen (AG); FC Zürich ^{TH} (ZH)	FC Breitenrain (BE); SC Brühl (SG); SC Cham (ZG); FC Köniz (BE); SC Kriens (LU); FC La Chaux-de-Fonds (NE); BSC Old Boys (BS); FC Rapperswil-Jona (SG); FC Tuggen (SZ)	FC Azzurri 90 LS (VD); AC Bellinzona (TI); FC Black Stars (BS); Lancy FC (GE); FC La Sarraz-Éclépens (VD); FC Münsingen (BE); FC Oberwallis Naters (VS); FC Red Star Zürich (ZH); FC Seefeld (ZH); FC Seuzach (ZH); FC Stade Lausanne Ouchy (VD); Yverdon-Sport FC (VD); Zug 94 (ZG)	SC Binningen (BL); FC Conthey (VS); FC Dulliken (SO); FC Genolier-Begnins (VD); FC Illiria Payerne (VD); FC Meyrin (GE); FC Moutier (BE); FC Ticino (NE); FC Uzwil (SG)	**Sixth tier**: US Arbedo (TI); FC Bazenheid (SG); FC Bubendorf (BL); AS Calcio Kreuzlingen (TG); FC Grenchen (SO); FC Gunzwil (LU); FC Klingnau (AG); CS Romontois (FR); SC Veltheim (ZH); FC Vernier (GE); FC Wabern (BE); **Seventh tier**: FC Donneloye (VD); SV Rümlang (ZH); FC Zollbrück (BE)

Teams in bold are still active in the competition.

^{TH} Title holders.

== Round 1 ==
Teams from Super League and Challenge League were seeded in this round. In a match, the home advantage was granted to the team from the lower league, if applicable. Teams in bold continue to the next round of the competition.

Team 1	Score	Team 2
**10 August 2016**
FC Bubendorf (6)	1–2	**Zug 94 (4)**
FC Wabern (6)	0–5	**SC Brühl (3)**
**SC Binningen (5)**	2–1	FC Münsingen (4)
FC Seefeld (4)	1–2	**FC Köniz (3)**
FC Grenchen (6)	0–2	**FC Illiria Payerne (5)**
**FC Gunzwil (6)**	2–0	FC Vernier (6)
FC Oberwallis Naters (4)	1–4	**FC Luzern (1)**
SV Rümlang (7)	2–5	**FC Seuzach (4)**
**FC Ticino (5)**	4–0	FC Uzwil (5)
FC Meyrin (5)	1–3	**FC Wohlen (2)**
Yverdon-Sport FC (4)	1–4	**FC Winterthur (2)**
CS Romontois (6)	1–6	**FC Sion (1)**
FC Conthey (5)	1–4	**AC Bellinzona (4)**
FC Klingnau (6)	0–6	**FC Tuggen (3)**
SC Veltheim (6)	0–6	**BSC Young Boys (1)**
FC Moutier (5)	0–3	**FC Lugano (1)**
US Arbedo (6)	0–5	**Neuchâtel Xamax FCS (2)**
FC La Chaux-de-Fonds (3)	0–2	**FC Zürich (2)**
**14 August 2016**
FC Dulliken (5)	0–3	**FC Chiasso (2)**
**FC Breitenrain (3)**	3–1	Servette FC (2)
FC Donneloye (7)	0–14	**FC Le Mont (2)**
BSC Old Boys (3)	0–2	**Grasshopper Club (1)**
FC Zollbrück (7)	0–5	**FC Aarau (2)**
**AS Calcio Kreuzlingen (6)**	1–0	SC Cham (3)
FC Genolier-Begnins (5)	1–3	**FC Azzurri 90 LS (4)**
Lancy FC (4)	1–2	**FC Lausanne-Sport (1)**
FC Rapperswil-Jona (3)	0–1	**FC Basel (1)**
FC La Sarraz-Éclépens (4)	0–3	**FC Schaffhausen (2)**
**FC Bazenheid (6)**	2–1	FC Red Star Zürich (4)
**FC Stade Lausanne Ouchy (4)**	4–2	FC Wil (2)
**SC Kriens (3)**	2–1	FC Thun (1)
**15 August 2016**
FC Black Stars (4)	2–3	**FC St. Gallen (1)**

== Round 2 ==
In a match, the home advantage was granted to the team from the lower league, if applicable. Teams in bold continue to the next round of the competition.

Team 1	Score	Team 2
**16 September 2016**
**FC Köniz (3)**	3–1	FC Lausanne-Sport (1)
FC Breitenrain (3)	0–1	**FC Aarau (2)**
**17 September 2016**
**FC Chiasso (2)**	1–0	FC Wohlen (2)
SC Binningen (5)	1–2	**SC Brühl (3)**
FC Gunzwil (6)	1–4	**FC Lugano (1)**
FC Stade Lausanne Ouchy (4)	0–3	**FC Winterthur (2)**
AS Calcio Kreuzlingen (6)	1–1 (5–6 p)	**FC Tuggen (3)**
FC Azzurri 90 LS (4)	2–3	**SC Kriens (3)**
FC Ticino (5)	0–3	**FC Luzern (1)**
FC Seuzach (4)	1–4	**Grasshopper Club (1)**
FC Le Mont (2)	0–1	**FC St. Gallen (1)**
**18 September 2016**
FC Bazenheid (6)	1–7	**BSC Young Boys (1)**
FC Illiria Payerne (5)	1–4	**FC Schaffhausen (2)**
Zug 94 (4)	0–1	**FC Basel (1)**
AC Bellinzona (4)	0–2	**FC Zürich (2)**
Neuchâtel Xamax FCS (2)	3–4	**FC Sion (1)**

== Round 3 ==
The winners of Round 2 played in this round. The home advantage was granted to the team from the lower league. Teams in bold continue to the quarter-finals.

Team 1	Score	Team 2
**26 October 2016**
**FC Aarau (2)**	2–0	FC Lugano (1)
**SC Kriens (3)**	5–3 (a.e.t.)	SC Brühl (3)
FC Tuggen (3)	1–4	**FC Basel (1)**
**FC Winterthur (2)**	2–1	FC Chiasso (2)
**BSC Young Boys (1)**	5–0	Grasshopper Club (1)
**27 October 2016**
FC Köniz (3)	1–1 (4–5 p)	**FC Lucerne (1)**
**FC Zürich (2)**	2–1	FC St. Gallen (1)
**2 November 2016**
FC Schaffhausen (2)	2–5 (a.e.t.)	**FC Sion (1)**

== Quarter-finals ==
The winners of Round 3 played in the Quarter-finals, there was no home advantage granted in the draw. SC Kriens, from the third tier of Swiss football, were the lowest-ranked team in this round.

1 March 2017	BSC Young Boys	**2–2** (a.e.t.) (**3–5** p)	**FC Winterthur**	Bern
19:30	Hoarau 8'; Bertone 39'	Report	Sílvio 61'; M. Sutter 66'	Stadium: Stade de Suisse; Attendance: 9,462; Referee: Sébastien Pache
	**Penalties**
	Hoarau (penalty scored); Ravet (penalty missed); Frey (penalty scored); Sanogo (penalty scored)		Di Gregorio (penalty scored); Cani (penalty scored); Schuler (penalty scored); M. Sutter (penalty scored); Sílvio (penalty scored)

1 March 2017	FC Aarau	**3–5**	**FC Lucerne**	Aarau
20:30	Josipovic 28'; Ciarrocchi 41'; Tréand 51'	Report	Juric 2', 54'; Neumayr 3'; M. Schneuwly 36', 76'	Stadium: Stadion Brügglifeld; Attendance: 6,162; Referee: Adrien Jaccottet

2 March 2017	**FC Sion**	**5–1**	SC Kriens	Sion
19:00	Mujangi 45', 78'; Konaté 65', 67', 83'	Report	Thali 32'	Stadium: Stade Tourbillon; Attendance: 6,000; Referee: Pascal Erlachner

2 March 2017	**FC Basel**	**3–1**	FC Zürich	Basel
20:30	Steffen (yellow card) 8'; Janko 20' (1:1); Lang 41' (2:1); Xhaka (yellow card) 28' (yellow-red card) 56'; Steffen 78' (3:1)	FCB summary Report	3' (0:1) Buff; (yellow card) 14' Nef; (yellow card) 15' Brunner; (yellow card) 58' Voser; (yellow card) 82' Schönbächler	Stadium: St. Jakob-Park; Attendance: 25,259; Referee: Alain Bieri (Solothurn)

== Semi-finals ==
The winners of Quarterfinals play in the Semifinals, there is no home advantage granted in the draw. The games played on the 5 April 2017.

5 April 2017	FC Winterthur	**1–3**	**FC Basel**	Winterthur
18:45	Gazzetta (yellow card) 24'; Cani 88' (1:2); Hebib (yellow card) 89'	FCB summary Report	54' (pen. 0:1) Delgado; (yellow card) 56' Janko; 85' (0:2) Akanji; 90+4' (1:3) Fransson	Stadium: Stadion Schützenwiese; Attendance: 9,400 (sold out); Referee: Sascha Amhof

5 April 2017	**FC Sion**	**0–0** (a.e.t.) (**6–5** p)	FC Luzern	Sion
20:45		Report		Stadium: Stade Tourbillon; Attendance: 11,300; Referee: Sandro Schärer
	**Penalties**
	Ziegler (penalty scored); Salatić (penalty missed); Konaté (penalty scored); Modou (penalty scored); Carlitos (penalty scored); Zverotić (penalty scored); Adão (penalty scored)		Kryeziu (penalty scored); M. Schneuwly (penalty scored); Affolter (penalty scored); Neumayr (penalty missed); Lustenberger (penalty scored); Voca (penalty scored); Haas (penalty missed)

== Final ==
The winners of the Semi-finals play in the Final. The match was played on 25 May 2017 at the Stade de Genève.

25 May 2017
16:00

FC Basel	3–0	FC Sion
Doumbia (yellow card) 44'; Delgado 47'; Traoré 62'; Lang (yellow card) 77' (goal) 89'; Xhaka (yellow card) 79'	SFV summary	(yellow card) 37' Salatic; (yellow card) 90+5' Lüchinger

Stade de Genève, Lancy
Attendance: 26,500
Referee: (Switzerland) Stephan Klossner

Teams

GK	(Czech Republic) Tomáš Vaclík
DF	(Switzerland) Michael Lang
DF	(Czech Republic) Marek Suchý
DF	(Switzerland) Manuel Akanji
DF	(Ivory Coast) Adama Traoré
MF	(Albania) Taulant Xhaka
MF	(Switzerland) Luca Zuffi	(substituted off) 90+3'
MF	(Norway) Mohamed Elyounoussi
MF	(Argentina) Matías Delgado (c)	(substituted off) 81'
MF	(Switzerland) Renato Steffen
ST	(Ivory Coast) Seydou Doumbia	(substituted off) 88'
Substitutes:
MF	(Ivory Coast) Serey Die	(substituted on) 81'
ST	(Austria) Marc Janko	(substituted on) 88'
MF	(Sweden) Alexander Fransson	(substituted on) 90+3'
Manager:
(Switzerland) Urs Fischer

GK	(Russia) Anton Mitryushkin
DF	(Switzerland) Nicolas Lüchinger
DF	(Montenegro) Elsad Zverotić (c)
DF	(Switzerland) Reto Ziegler
DF	(The Gambia) Pa Modou Jagne	(substituted off) 63'
MF	(Switzerland) Gregory Karlen	(substituted off) 70'
MF	(Switzerland) Vero Salatić
MF	(Guinea) Kévin Constant
ST	(Democratic Republic of the Congo) Chadrac Akolo	(substituted off) 79'
ST	(Senegal) Moussa Konaté
ST	(Angola) Joaquim Adão
Substitutes:
MF	(Portugal) Carlitos	(substituted on) 63'
MF	(Belgium) Geoffrey Mujangi Bia	(substituted on) 70'
MF	(Brazil) Léo Itaperuna	(substituted on) 79'
Manager:
(Switzerland) Sébastien Fournier
