= Taulant Xhaka =

Albania international footballer (born 1991)

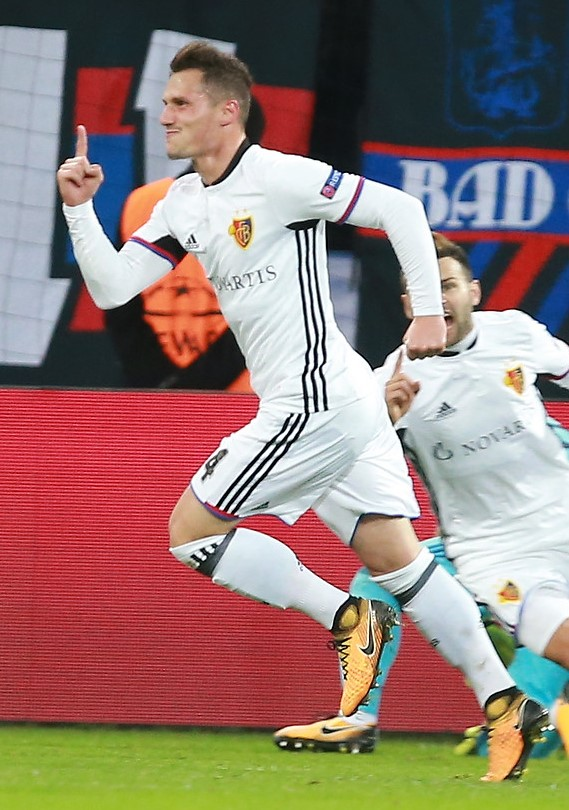
- Xhaka with Basel in 2017

Personal information
- Full name: Taulant Ragip Xhaka
- Date of birth: 28 March 1991 (age 35)
- Place of birth: Basel, Switzerland
- Height: 1.72 m (5 ft 8 in)
- Positions: Defensive midfielder; defender

Team information
- Current team: Dardania Basel (manager)

Youth career
- 2000–2002: Concordia Basel
- 2002–2008: Basel

Senior career*
Years	Team	Apps	(Gls)
2008–2010	Basel U21	50	(6)
2010–2025	Basel	280	(6)
2012–2013	→ Grasshoppers (loan)	38	(0)
Total		368	(12)

International career
2008–2009	Switzerland U17	14	(0)
2009–2010	Switzerland U18	6	(0)
2009–2010	Switzerland U19	9	(0)
2010–2011	Switzerland U20	8	(0)
2011–2013	Switzerland U21	4	(0)
2014–2019	Albania	31	(1)

Managerial career
- 2025–: Dardania Basel
- * Club domestic league appearances and goals

Taulant Ragip Xhaka (born 28 March 1991) is an Albanian football manager and former professional footballer who manages Swiss club Dardania Basel.

A defensive midfielder, Xhaka spent most of his playing career with Basel, making 407 competitive appearances and winning seven Swiss Super League titles and four Swiss Cup titles. He also played for Grasshoppers on loan during the 2011–12 and 2012–13 seasons, winning the 2012–13 Swiss Cup.

Born in Switzerland, Xhaka represented the country at youth international level before switching allegiance to Albania in 2014. He earned 31 caps for Albania and was part of the squad at UEFA Euro 2016.

After retiring from professional football in May 2025, Xhaka became manager of Dardania Basel the following month. In his first season, he led the club to promotion to 3. Liga.

== Early life ==
Xhaka was born in Basel, Switzerland, to Albanian parents originally from Kosovo. He is the elder brother of Granit Xhaka, who is also a professional footballer and plays for Sunderland and the Swiss national team. His father, Ragip, had spent three years in a Yugoslav prison for his involvement in student protests before leaving Kosovo as a political refugee in the early 1990s and settling in Switzerland with his wife, Eli, where Taulant was born in March 1991 and his younger brother, Granit, in September 1992; Ragip worked as a gardener, while Eli also worked to support the family. Xhaka grew up in Basel with his younger brother, and the two often played football in a nearby park, where their father encouraged them to take up the sport after a local youth worker recommended enrolling them in a football club. He started playing football at the age of six and began his career at Concordia Basel in 2000, before moving with his brother to Basel two years later.

== Club career ==
=== Basel ===
Xhaka progressed through various Basel youth teams before becoming a regular member of the under-21 side in the third tier Swiss 1. Liga in 2008, where he spent three seasons, making 50 appearances and scoring six goals. At the start of the 2010–11 season, he and his brother Granit were promoted to the first-team squad, with Taulant playing as a defender. He made his first-team debut on 19 September 2010 in a 5–0 Swiss Cup first-round win over Mendrisio-Stabio. He made his Swiss Super League debut on 27 February 2011 in a 1–0 away win over Luzern. At the end of the season, Basel won the league title, Xhaka's first trophy with the club.

During the 2011–12 season, Xhaka made his UEFA Champions League debut on 27 September 2011, coming on as a substitute in Basel's 3–3 away draw against Manchester United at Old Trafford.

==== Loan to Grasshoppers ====
Having made only four appearances during the first half of the season, Xhaka joined Grasshoppers on loan on 18 January 2012 to gain more first-team experience, with the agreement running until summer 2013. He made his debut on 12 February, coming on as a substitute in the 2–0 away defeat to Zürich. He made 13 league appearances during the second half of the 2011–12 season and a further 25 in 2012–13, when Grasshoppers finished runners-up in the Swiss Super League and won the Swiss Cup. He featured in the semi-final victory over Zürich but missed the final against Basel through suspension.

==== Return to Basel ====
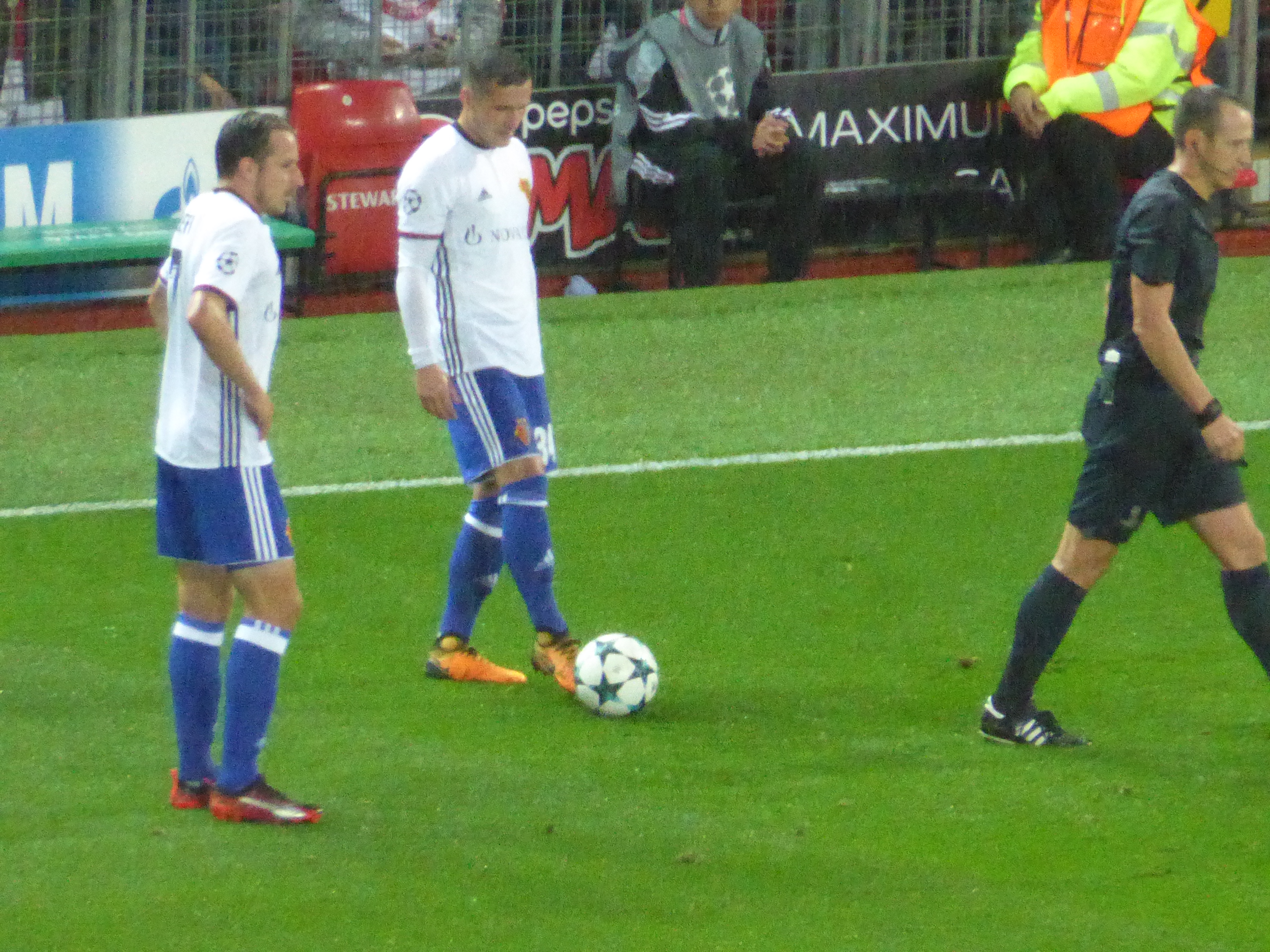
Xhaka on the ball during a game against Manchester United.

He returned to Basel in summer 2013, when the club included him in its first-team plans ahead of the 2013–14 season. Under coach Murat Yakin, he established himself in the starting lineup, primarily playing as a full-back, and made 23 Super League appearances and scored twice as Basel won the league title. On 3 August 2013, Xhaka scored his first Super League goal in a 1–1 away draw against Gallen. He also made four appearances in the Swiss Cup, as Basel reached the final but lost 2–0 to Zürich after extra time. He was also part of Basel's European campaign, making ten appearances in the UEFA Champions League and five in the UEFA Europa League, with the club reaching the quarter-finals of the latter competition.

During the 2014–15 season, Xhaka further established himself in the starting lineup, making 29 Super League appearances as Basel won their sixth consecutive league title. He scored his first goal of the season on 27 September 2014 in a 1–1 home draw against Thun. On 9 January 2015, he extended his contract with Basel by a further three years, until 30 June 2018. In February, he was named in the 2014 Swiss Team of the Year as a right-back. Basel's squad included three Albania internationals, Xhaka, Shkëlzen Gashi and Arlind Ajeti, for the first leg of the Champions League round of 16 against Porto on 18 February, which ended in a 1–1 draw. Xhaka featured again in the return leg on 10 March, when Basel lost 4–0 and were eliminated 5–1 on aggregate. Under new coach Paulo Sousa, Xhaka became an important member of the team, featuring in both defence and midfield. On 7 June, he started in the 2015 Swiss Cup final, which Basel lost 3–0 to Sion, extending their run of consecutive final defeats to three.

Under coach Urs Fischer, Xhaka remained a regular starter during the 2015–16 season, primarily playing as a defensive midfielder but also featuring at centre-back or full-back when required. In September 2015, he was sent off following an altercation with Renato Steffen after Basel's 4–3 defeat to Young Boys; his initial three-match ban for violent conduct was reduced to two on appeal, in addition to a one-match suspension for an accumulation of yellow cards. On 13 December, he was forced off through injury during Basel's Swiss Cup quarter-final against Sion. In February 2016, Xhaka received a four-match suspension after pulling Moritz Bauer's hair and shouting in his face during a league match against Grasshoppers. He made 24 Super League appearances as Basel secured their seventh consecutive league title and 19th overall. He also made ten appearances in the 2015–16 UEFA Europa League, where Basel reached the round of 16. On 23 July 2016, he extended his contract with Basel until June 2021.

During the 2016–17 season, Xhaka made 30 league appearances as Basel won their eighth consecutive title and 20th overall. In the Champions League group stage, he started all six matches, playing every minute as Basel finished fourth in Group A and were eliminated. Basel also won the Swiss Cup, defeating Sion 3–0 in the final to claim their 12th cup title and complete the sixth domestic double in the club's history.

Following Matías Delgado's retirement in July 2017, Xhaka was appointed one of Basel's vice-captains on 5 August, alongside Michael Lang, with Marek Suchý taking over as captain for the 2017–18 season. On 18 October, Xhaka scored his first UEFA Champions League goal, opening the scoring and providing an assist for Dimitri Oberlin in Basel's 2–0 away win against CSKA Moscow in the group stage. After receiving his third booking of the group stage in the 2–1 home defeat to CSKA on 31 October, he was suspended for one match and returned for the final group match, a 2–0 away win against Benfica, in which he received his fourth booking of the competition; the victory secured Basel's second-place finish in Group A with 12 points and qualification for the round of 16. Xhaka received his fifth booking in the 4–0 home defeat to Manchester City in the first leg of the round of 16 on 13 February 2018, resulting in a suspension for the return leg, which Basel won 2–1 away before being eliminated 5–2 on aggregate. In the Swiss Super League, Xhaka made 23 appearances, including 21 starts, scoring once and providing one assist as Basel finished runners-up behind Young Boys.

During the 2018–19 season, Xhaka made 29 Super League appearances, including 25 starts, and provided one assist as the club finished runners-up. Although primarily a midfielder, he was also deployed as a centre-back in consecutive league matches against Neuchâtel Xamax and Thun in November 2018, later explaining that his experience allowed him to cover several positions. Xhaka started in the 2019 Swiss Cup final, playing the full match as Basel defeated Thun 2–1 to win their 13th cup title.

During the 2019–20 season, Xhaka remained a regular starter under manager Marcel Koller, making 32 Swiss Super League appearances, including 29 starts, and providing three assists as Basel finished third. Primarily deployed as a defensive midfielder, he also started all ten of Basel's matches in the 2019–20 UEFA Europa League, helping the club reach the quarter-finals. Basel finished top of their group with 13 points before eliminating APOEL and Eintracht Frankfurt in the knockout phase. In the quarter-final against Shakhtar Donetsk on 11 August 2020, Xhaka started but was substituted in the 60th minute after sustaining a knee injury, as Basel lost 4–1 and were eliminated. The injury was later diagnosed as damage to the medial collateral ligament in his knee and required surgery in January 2021, ruling him out for the remainder of the following season.

Xhaka missed the entire 2020–21 season while recovering from the injury. He returned to action in a pre-season friendly against Thun during Basel's training camp in Crans-Montana, captaining the side. Xhaka made his competitive return on 22 July 2021, starting in Basel's 3–0 home win against Partizani in the second qualifying round of the 2021–22 UEFA Europa Conference League. During the 2021–22 season, he made 25 Swiss Super League appearances, including 21 starts, and scored once as Basel finished runners-up.

During the 2022–23 season, Xhaka made 20 Swiss Super League appearances, including 15 starts, and provided three assists as Basel finished fifth. In the UEFA Europa Conference League, he made 13 appearances, starting 12, as Basel reached the semi-finals for the second time in the club's history. Basel were eliminated by Fiorentina after losing 4–3 on aggregate in the semi-finals, despite winning the first leg 2–1 in Florence. On 7 May 2023, while captaining Basel in a 2–0 league defeat to Zürich, Xhaka was sent off after striking Antonio Marchesano and headbutting Nikola Katić. The Swiss Football League subsequently suspended him for eight matches: seven for the two acts of violence and one for accumulating his eighth yellow card of the season, ruling him out of Basel's remaining league fixtures.

During the 2023–24 season, Xhaka made 26 Swiss Super League appearances, including 21 starts, scoring one goal and providing one assist as Basel finished eighth. On 9 December 2023, he was sent off in the 18th minute of Basel's 1–0 home defeat to Grasshoppers for a foul on Bradley Fink. The Swiss Football League subsequently handed him a two-match suspension, causing him to miss Basel's final league match of 2023 and their first match after the winter break.

During the 2024–25 season, Xhaka was used sparingly, making ten league appearances, including two starts, as Basel won the league title. On 12 February 2025, Basel announced that Xhaka would retire at the end of the season, despite having a contract with the club until 2027. On 24 May, he made his final appearance for Basel in a 4–0 league win against Luzern, captaining the team before being substituted in the 34th minute in recognition of his shirt number. He retired having made 407 competitive appearances for Basel, winning seven Swiss league titles and four Swiss Cups with the club.

== International career ==
=== Switzerland ===
Xhaka began his international career with Switzerland under-17 at the 2008 UEFA European Under-17 Championship. He started all three of the team's group matches as Switzerland were eliminated in the group stage. He subsequently represented the under-18 and under-19 teams.

Xhaka made his under-20 debut on 6 September 2010 in a 3–2 defeat to Germany at Stadion Breite in Schaffhausen. He earned his first under-21 cap on 7 October 2011, starting in a 1–0 away win against Georgia. He made 41 appearances across Switzerland's youth teams.

=== Albania ===
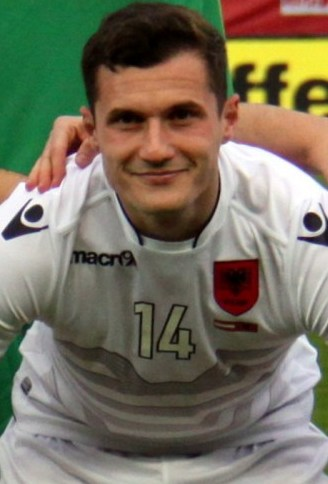
Xhaka with Albania in 2016

In May 2013, Xhaka expressed his intention to represent the Albania national team, describing his decision as definitive. He later revealed that his younger brother Granit had encouraged him to choose Albania over Switzerland. On 18 December 2013, he received Albanian citizenship, but still required FIFA approval to represent the country in official matches. Xhaka received his first call-up from manager Gianni De Biasi for the friendly against Malta on 5 March 2014, but withdrew after sustaining an injury while playing for Basel. A further injury prevented him from joining the squad for the friendlies against Romania, Hungary and San Marino in May. On 25 June 2014, he received FIFA approval to represent Albania.

He made his international debut on 7 September 2014, starting in Albania's 1–0 away victory over Portugal in the UEFA Euro 2016 qualifying campaign, playing the full match in the country's first victory against Portugal. He was subsequently included in Goal.com's Team of the Week for the opening round of qualifying. Xhaka also started Albania's next qualifying match, a 1–1 draw against Denmark on 11 October, at the newly refurbished Elbasan Arena, and tested goalkeeper Kasper Schmeichel with a first-half shot. Three days later, he started Albania's qualifying match against Serbia in Belgrade, which was abandoned following a confrontation between players and incidents involving pitch-invading supporters; during the incident, Xhaka and Andi Lila retrieved a banner depicting the map of Greater Albania from Serbian player Stefan Mitrović, who had taken it down from a drone flying over the pitch. UEFA initially awarded Serbia a 3–0 victory, but the Court of Arbitration for Sport overturned the result on appeal on 10 July 2015, awarding Albania a 3–0 forfeit victory while upholding Serbia's points deduction. Later that month, Xhaka and Lorik Cana were named honorary citizens of Mitrovica, Kosovo, by the city's mayor for the bravery shown in protecting national symbols. Xhaka played every minute of Albania's final five qualifying matches, providing the cross for Mërgim Mavraj's equaliser in a 2–1 win over Armenia on 29 March 2015 and featuring in the 3–0 away victory against the same opponents on 11 October, which secured Albania's qualification for its first major tournament, UEFA Euro 2016.

On 21 May 2016, Xhaka was named in Albania's preliminary 27-man squad for UEFA Euro 2016, before being included in the final 23-man squad on 31 May. He started Albania's opening match against Switzerland, facing his brother Granit in the first meeting between brothers at a UEFA European Championship, while manager De Biasi deployed him on the right of midfield, rather than in his usual central role, placing him directly opposite his brother; their mother watched from the stands wearing a shirt bearing both countries' flags, as Albania lost 1–0. He was substituted in the 62nd minute and reacted by throwing a water bottle towards the dugout, later explaining that he had been disappointed by the substitution rather than involved in a confrontation with De Biasi. He came on as a substitute in the 2–0 defeat to hosts France, but remained unused in Albania's 1–0 victory over Romania. Albania finished third in the group but were eliminated after ranking last among the third-placed teams.

Xhaka made four appearances in Albania's 2018 FIFA World Cup qualifying campaign, in which the team finished third in its group. Following Albania's 2–0 defeat away to Italy on 24 March 2017, in which he was an unused substitute, Xhaka announced that he would not play for the national team while De Biasi remained manager. He subsequently criticised the manager, accusing him of prioritising financial interests over the national team, while De Biasi said Xhaka would be recalled only after a public apology.

Following De Biasi's departure in June 2017, his successor Christian Panucci sought to resolve the dispute. Xhaka later denied reports that he had refused to meet Panucci and reaffirmed his willingness to represent Albania. Panucci later confirmed that the matter had been resolved following an apology on Xhaka's behalf, and recalled him to the squad in October 2017. He returned to the starting lineup in a 3–0 defeat away to Spain on 6 October, his first international appearance in 11 months, as Albania's qualification hopes ended. Xhaka scored his first international goal in Albania's inaugural UEFA Nations League match, a 1–0 home win in the 2018–19 League C Group 1 against Israel on 8 September 2018, with a second-half strike from outside the penalty area.

During the UEFA Euro 2020 qualifying campaign, he made four appearances, starting Albania's first three matches before coming on as a substitute in a 4–1 defeat to France on 7 September 2019, his final appearance for the national team. Albania finished fourth in Group H and failed to qualify for the tournament. On 16 November 2021, Xhaka announced his retirement from international football, citing recurring injuries and personal reasons, having made 31 appearances and scored one goal for Albania.

== Managerial career ==
In June 2025, shortly after retiring from professional football, Xhaka was appointed manager of Dardania Basel, a fourth-tier Swiss club closely associated with the Kosovo Albanian community. His appointment continued his family's longstanding connection with the club: his father, Ragip, had previously been involved with Dardania and briefly returned from Kosovo to coach the team in its final matches of the 2024–25 season. In May 2026, Xhaka led Dardania to promotion to the Promotion League, securing the achievement with a 2–1 win over FC Croatia Basel four matches before the end of the season.

== Personal life ==
Following Albania's participation in UEFA Euro 2016, Xhaka was among the national team players selected to receive diplomatic passports from the Albanian government in recognition of their achievement.

On 7 January 2018, Xhaka became engaged to his girlfriend Arbnora Nuredini, with whom he had made his relationship public around six months earlier. They held their traditional wedding ceremony in May 2018, before legally formalising their marriage on 28 January 2020, when they signed the marriage certificate. The couple had their first child, a son named Klevis, on 25 March that year. Their second child, a daughter named Maleya, was born on 23 July 2022.

== Career statistics ==
=== Club ===
As of 24 May 2025

Appearances and goals by club, season and competition
Club	Season	League			National cup		Europe		Total	
Club	Season	Division	Apps	Goals	Apps	Goals	Apps	Goals	Apps	Goals
Basel U21	2008–09	1. Liga Promotion	11	1	—		—		11	1
Basel U21	2009–10	1. Liga Promotion	23	2	—		—		23	2
Basel U21	2010–11	1. Liga Promotion	16	3	—		—		16	3
Basel U21	Total		50	6	—		—		50	6
Basel	2010–11	Swiss Super League	5	0	3	0	0	0	8	0
Basel	2011–12	Swiss Super League	4	0	2	0	1 (Note: Appearances in UEFA Champions League)	0	7	0
Basel	2013–14	Swiss Super League	23	2	4	0	15 (Note: Ten appearances in UEFA Champions League, five appearances in UEFA Europa League)	0	42	2
Basel	2014–15	Swiss Super League	29	1	4	0	7	0	40	1
Basel	2015–16	Swiss Super League	24	0	1	0	12 (Note: Two appearances in UEFA Champions League, ten appearances in UEFA Europa League)	0	37	0
Basel	2016–17	Swiss Super League	30	0	3	0	6	0	39	0
Basel	2017–18	Swiss Super League	23	1	5	1	6	1	34	3
Basel	2018–19	Swiss Super League	29	0	4	0	1 (Note: Appearances in UEFA Europa League)	0	34	0
Basel	2019–20	Swiss Super League	32	0	2	0	12 (Note: Two appearances in UEFA Champions League, ten appearances in UEFA Europa League)	0	46	0
Basel	2020–21	Swiss Super League	0	0	0	0	0	0	0	0
Basel	2021–22	Swiss Super League	25	1	1	1	10 (Note: Appearances in UEFA Europa Conference League)	0	36	2
Basel	2022–23	Swiss Super League	20	0	4	0	14	0	38	0
Basel	2023–24	Swiss Super League	26	1	4	0	1	0	31	1
Basel	2024–25	Swiss Super League	10	0	3	0	—		13	0
Basel	Total		280	6	40	2	85	1	405	9
Grasshoppers (loan)	2011–12	Swiss Super League	13	0	1	0	—		14	0
Grasshoppers (loan)	2012–13	Swiss Super League	25	0	4	0	—		29	0
Grasshoppers (loan)	Total		38	0	5	0	—		43	0
Career total			368	12	45	2	85	1	498	15

=== International ===
As of 7 September 2019

Appearances and goals by national team and year
National team	Year	Apps	Goals
Albania	2014	3	0
Albania	2015	7	0
Albania	2016	8	0
Albania	2017	2	0
Albania	2018	7	1
Albania	2019	4	0
Total		31	1

Scores and results list Albania's goal tally first, score column indicates score after each Xhaka goal.

List of international goals scored by Taulant Xhaka
No.	Date	Venue	Opponent	Score	Result	Competition
1	7 September 2018	Elbasan Arena, Elbasan, Albania	Israel	1–0	1–0	2018–19 UEFA Nations League C

== Managerial statistics ==
As of 7 November 2026

Managerial statistics
Team	From	To	Record				
Team	From	To	P	W	D	L	Win %
Dardania Basel	1 July 2025	Present	8	7	1	0	87.50

== Honours ==
Basel

- Swiss Super League: 2010–11, 2011–12, 2013–14, 2014–15, 2015–16, 2016–17, 2024–25
- Swiss Cup: 2016–17, 2018–19, 2024–25

Grasshoppers

- Swiss Cup: 2012–13

Basel U18

- U18 Swiss Cup: 2007–08

Individual

- Swiss Super League Dream Team: 2014
