= Marek Suchý =

Czech footballer (born 1988)

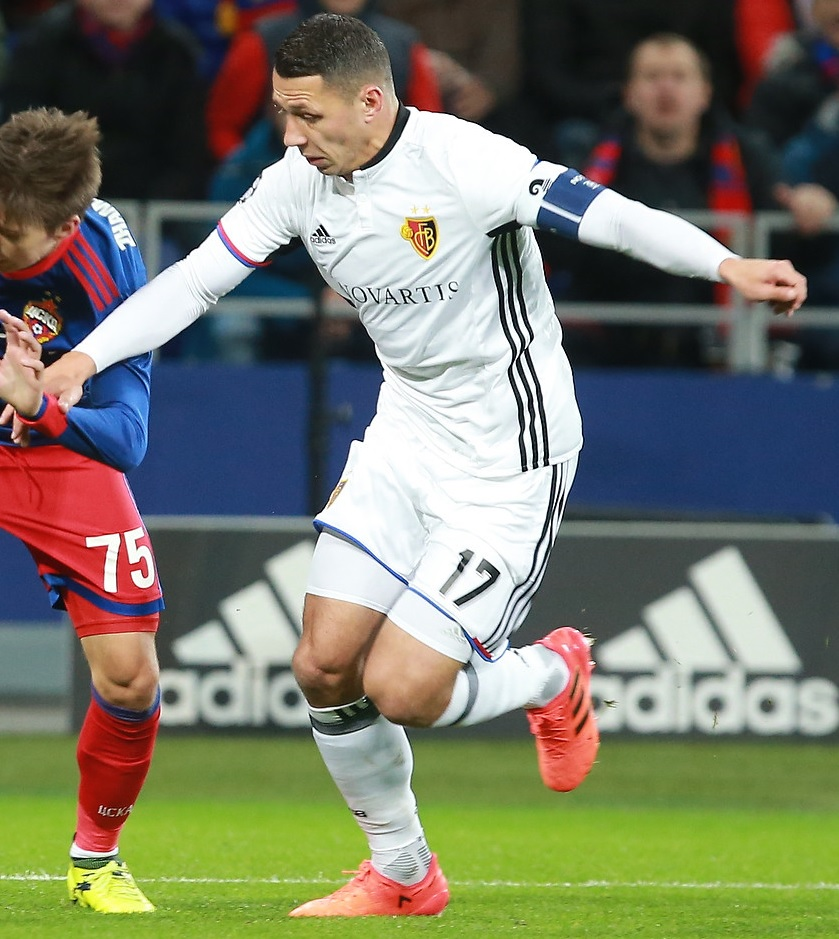
- Suchý with Basel in 2017

Personal information
- Full name: Marek Suchý
- Date of birth: 29 March 1988 (age 38)
- Place of birth: Prague, Czechoslovakia
- Height: 1.85 m (6 ft 1 in)
- Position: Centre-back

Team information
- Current team: Slavia Prague B
- Number: 17

Youth career
- 1993–2005: Slavia Prague

Senior career*
Years	Team	Apps	(Gls)
2005–2010	Slavia Prague	109	(1)
2009–2010	→ Spartak Moscow (loan)	8	(1)
2010–2014	Spartak Moscow	76	(4)
2014	→ Basel (loan)	16	(1)
2014–2019	Basel	147	(10)
2019–2021	Augsburg	12	(0)
2021–2025	Mladá Boleslav	127	(5)
2025–	Slavia Prague B	0	(0)

International career
2006–2007	Czech Republic U20	10	(0)
2007–2010	Czech Republic U21	15	(0)
2010–2019	Czech Republic	44	(1)
- * Club domestic league appearances and goals as of 2 June 2025

Marek Suchý (born 29 March 1988) is a Czech professional footballer who plays as a centre-back for Slavia Prague B and former captain of the Czech Republic national team.

== Club career ==
=== Slavia, Spartak ===
Primarily a centre-back capable of performing defensive midfield roles, Suchý featured in Slavia's senior team since 2005. Although he was linked with Rangers as well as other teams in England, France and Germany in summer 2008, he stayed at Slavia. On 24 November 2009, he was loaned out to FC Spartak Moscow for one year with an option to buy for €3.5 Million. Spartak later exercised the option.

=== Basel ===
In January 2014, Suchý was loaned out to Swiss club FC Basel for the second half of the 2013–14 Swiss Super League season, with a buying option at the end of that period. He joined Basel's first team during the winter break of their 2013–14 season under head coach Murat Yakin. Suchý played his debut for Basel on 2 February 2014 in the 3–1 away win at the Stade Olympique de la Pontaise against Lausanne-Sport. Just three days later, on 5 February 2014, he scored his first goal for his new team in the Swiss Cup quarter-final match as Basel won 6–1 against Le Mont. He scored his first league goal for his new club in the home game in the St. Jakob-Park on 16 March as Basel won 1–0 against Aarau. At the end of the 2013–14 Super League season Suchý won the league championship with Basel. The team also reached the final of the 2013–14 Swiss Cup, but were beaten 2–0 by Zürich after extra time. Basel had qualified for Europa League knockout phase and here they advanced as far as the quarter-finals. But eventually they were beaten by Valencia 5–3 on aggregate, after extra time.

Basel exercised their option and bought out Suchý's contract as the loan period came to an end. For Basel's 2014–15 season Paulo Sousa was appointed as new head coach and it was a very successful season for the team. Basel entered the Champions League in the group stage. Suchý scored his first Champions League goal for his team in the home game in the St. Jakob-Park on 4 November. It was the last goal of the game as Basel won 4–0 against Ludogorets Razgrad. However, in the round of 16 they were knocked out of the competition by Porto. In the 2014–15 Swiss Cup Basel reached the final, but for the third consecutive season they finished the competition as runners-up, losing 0–3 against Sion. At the end of the 2014–15 league season Basel won the championship for the sixth time in a row. Basel played a total of 65 matches (36 Swiss League fixtures, 6 Swiss Cup, 8 Champions League and 15 test matches). Under trainer Paulo Sousa Suchý totaled 52 appearances, 30 League, four Cup, 7 Champions League, as well 11 in test games. He scored 2 goals in these matches, one of which was in the Super League, one in the Champions League.

Basel hired Urs Fischer as their new head coach for their 2015–16 season. Basel started in the 2015–16 UEFA Champions League in the third qualifying round. But in the play-off round against Maccabi Tel Aviv they were knocked out of the competition on the away goals rule. They continued in the 2015–16 UEFA Europa League group stage and ended this at the top of the table. The team advanced to the round of 16, but here were beaten by Sevilla 3–0 on aggregate. Suchý scored one goal in nine appearances. This goal was in the home game against Fiorentina on 26 November 2015. Under head coach Fischer, Suchý won a third consecutive Swiss championship at the end of the 2015–16 Super League season

At the end of Basel's 2016–17 season, Suchý won the championship with the club for the fourth consecutive time. For the club this was the eighth title in a row and their 20th championship title in total. They also won the 2016–17 Swiss Cup, defeating Sion 3–0 in the final, which meant they had won the double.

In Basel's 2017–18 season Raphaël Wicky was appointed as new head coach and Suchý was appointed as new team captain, following Matías Delgado's retirement from his active career. In the domestic league Basel ended the season in second position and in the Cup they reached the semi-final only to be defeated by Young Boys. The team entered the Champions League in the group stage, ending this in second position in the table. They advanced to the round of 16 but, despite an away win in the Etihad Stadium, Basel were knocked out of the competition by Manchester City 5–2 on aggregate.

Basel's 2018–19 season started badly. Already in the preparation games things went wrong and as the team started their league season they lost the first game against St. Gallen. Head coach Raphaël Wicky was replaced by Marcel Koller. But things were not much better. Suchý injured himself during the game on 12 August 2018 and didn't play in another game that year. Basel ended the league season in second position, with a massiv 20 points residue behind champions Young Boys. However, Basel won the Swiss Cup in the 2018–19 season. In the first round Basel beat FC Montlingen 3–0, in the second round Echallens Région 7–2 and in the round of 16 Winterthur 1–0. In the quarter-finals Sion were defeated 4–2 after extra time and in the semi-finals Zürich were defeated 3–1. All these games were played away from home. The final was held on 19 May 2019 in the Stade de Suisse Wankdorf Bern against Thun. Striker Albian Ajeti scored the first goal, Fabian Frei the second for Basel, then Dejan Sorgić netted a goal for Thun, but the result was 2–1 for Basel. Suchý played in three cup games.

At the end of the season the club announced that Suchý had decided not to extend his contract and he left Basel to start a new challenge elsewhere. During his five and a half years with the club, Suchý played a total of 265 games for Basel scoring a total of 14 goals. 163 of these games were in the Swiss Super League, 20 in the Swiss Cup, 41 in the UEFA competitions (Champions League and Europa League) and 41 were friendly games. He scored 11 goals in the domestic league, one in the cup and two in the European games.

=== FC Augsburg ===
On 8 July 2019, Suchý joined FC Augsburg on a two-year deal.

== International career ==
On 8 October 2010, Suchý debuted for the Czech senior squad during a UEFA Euro 2012 qualifying Group I match against Scotland which ended in 1–0 victory for the Czech Republic. On 14 November, he made his second senior international appearance in a 3-0 friendly victory against Slovakia.

On 6 February 2013, Suchý played as a starter during a 0-2 friendly victory against Turkey in Manissa. On 31 March 2015, he played the second friendly match against Slovakia, this time in Žilina whilst serving as captain of the Czech senior squad for the first time.

== Career statistics ==
=== Club ===
As of match played 13 February 2023

Appearances and goal by club, season and competition
Club	Season	League			National cup		Europe		Total	
Club	Season	Division	Apps	Goals	Apps	Goals	Apps	Goals	Apps	Goals
Slavia Prague	2004–05	Czech First League	3	0	0	0	0	0	3	0
Slavia Prague	2005–06	Czech First League	21	0	0	0	10 (Note: Two appearances in the UEFA Champions League, eight appearances in the UEFA Cup)	0	31	0
Slavia Prague	2006–07	Czech First League	16	0	0	0	3 (Note: Appearance(s) in the UEFA Cup)	0	19	0
Slavia Prague	2007–08	Czech First League	26	1	0	0	12 (Note: Ten appearances in the UEFA Champions League, two appearances in the UEFA Cup)	0	38	1
Slavia Prague	2008–09	Czech First League	27	0	0	0	8 (Note: Two appearances in the UEFA Champions League, six appearances in the UEFA Cup)	0	35	0
Slavia Prague	2009–10	Czech First League	16	0	0	0	9 (Note: Two appearances in the UEFA Champions League, seven appearances in the UEFA Europa League)	0	25	0
Slavia Prague	Total		109	1	0	0	42	0	151	1
Spartak Moscow (loan)	2010	Russian Premier League	8	1	0	0	0	0	8	1
Spartak Moscow	2010	Russian Premier League	17	0	3	0	11 (Note: Six appearances in the UEFA Champions League, five appearances in the UEFA Europa League)	0	31	0
Spartak Moscow	2011–12	Russian Premier League	32	3	1	0	0	0	33	3
Spartak Moscow	2012–13	Russian Premier League	21	1	1	0	7 (Note: Appearance(s) in the UEFA Champions League)	0	29	1
Spartak Moscow	2013–14	Russian Premier League	6	0	1	0	2 (Note: Appearance(s) in the UEFA Europa League)	0	9	0
Spartak Moscow	Total		84	5	6	0	20	0	110	5
Basel (loan)	2013–14	Swiss Super League	16	1	3	1	4	0	23	2
Basel	2014–15	Swiss Super League	30	1	4	0	7	1	41	2
Basel	2015–16	Swiss Super League	34	2	1	0	13 (Note: Four appearances in the UEFA Champions League, nine appearances and one goal in the UEFA Europa League)	1	48	3
Basel	2016–17	Swiss Super League	33	4	4	0	6	0	43	4
Basel	2017–18	Swiss Super League	31	1	5	0	8	0	44	1
Basel	2018–19	Swiss Super League	19	2	3	0	3 (Note: Two appearances in the UEFA Champions League, one appearance in the UEFA Europa League)	0	25	2
Basel	Total		163	11	20	1	41	2	224	14
FC Augsburg	2019–20	Bundesliga	7	0	1	0	—		8	0
FC Augsburg	2020–21	Bundesliga	5	0	0	0	—		5	0
FC Augsburg	Total		12	0	1	0	0	0	13	0
Mladá Boleslav	2021–22	Czech First League	29	0	4	0	—		33	0
Mladá Boleslav	2022–23	Czech First League	18	0	2	0	—		20	0
Mladá Boleslav	Total		47	0	6	0	0	0	49	0
Career total			415	17	33	1	103	2	551	20

=== International ===
Scores and results list Czech Republic's goal tally first, score column indicates score after each Suchý goal.

List of international goals scored by Marek Suchý
No.	Date	Venue	Opponent	Score	Result	Competition
1	5 June 2016	Sinobo Stadium, Prague, Czech Republic	South Korea	1–2	1–2	Friendly

== Honours ==
Slavia Prague

- Czech First League: 2007–08, 2008–09

Basel

- Swiss Super League: 2013–14, 2014–15, 2015–16, 2016–17
- Swiss Cup: 2016–17, 2018–19

Czech Rupublic U-21

- FIFA U-20 World Cup runner-up: 2007

Individual

- The annual Golden Ball awards in 2006, the "Revelation of the Year" award for young player of the year.
- Swiss Super League Team of the Year: 2014–15, 2015–16, 2016–17
