= Renato Steffen =

Swiss footballer (born 1991)

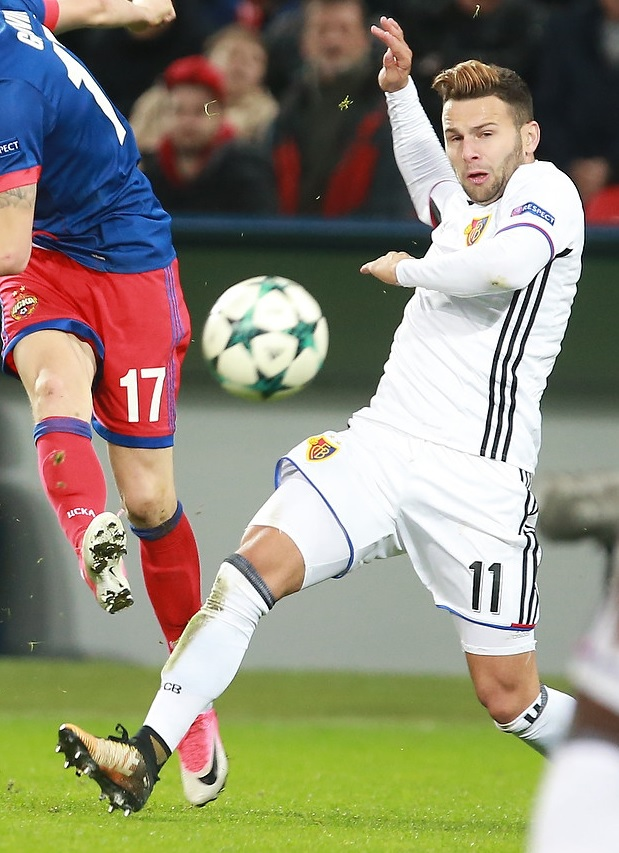
- Steffen with Basel in 2017

Personal information
- Full name: Renato Steffen
- Date of birth: 3 November 1991 (age 35)
- Place of birth: Aarau, Switzerland
- Height: 1.70 m (5 ft 7 in)
- Position: Winger

Team information
- Current team: Lugano
- Number: 11

Youth career
- 1998–2004: FC Erlinsbach
- 2004–2007: Aarau
- 2007–2011: SC Schöftland

Senior career*
Years	Team	Apps	(Gls)
2011–2012	Solothurn	28	(8)
2012–2013	Thun	22	(4)
2013–2016	Young Boys	84	(21)
2016–2018	Basel	86	(17)
2018–2022	VfL Wolfsburg	144	(18)
2022–	Lugano	121	(29)

International career^{‡}
2015–	Switzerland	41	(4)
- * Club domestic league appearances and goals as of 28 September 2026 ‡ National team caps and goals as of 8 September 2024

Renato Steffen (born 3 November 1991) is a Swiss professional footballer who plays as a left winger for Swiss Super League club Lugano and the Switzerland national team.

== Club career ==
=== Youth football ===
Steffen played his youth football with local club FC Erlinsbach. He played three years in the Aarau U-14 and U-16 youth teams. He then transferred to SC Schöftland and spent four years with them.

=== Solothurn and Thun ===
Steffen played amateur football in the 1. Liga Classic for Solothurn. After one season he transferred to Thun in July 2012 and made his professional debut on 2 September 2012 in the game against Servette FC. He scored 4 goals in 19 games for Thun in the 2012–13 Swiss Super League that season.

=== Young Boys ===
At the end of that season Steffen was sold for €500.000 to Young Boys. Here he signed a four-year deal in Bern.

=== Basel ===
During the winter break of the 2015–16 Super League, on 12 January, Basel announced that Steffen had signed a four-and-a-half-year contract with them. Steffen played his first team league debut for Basel on 7 February, coming in as a substitute in the 74th minute, in the home game in the St. Jakob-Park against Luzern. He scored his first goal for his new club in the same game, it was the final goal of the match in the 85 minute and Basel won the game 3–0.

Under trainer Urs Fischer Steffen won the Swiss Super League championship with Basel at the end of their 2015–16 season. Again at the end of the 2016–17 Super League season Basel won the league title. For the club this was the eighth title in a row and their 20th championship title in total. They also won the Swiss Cup for the twelfth time that season, which meant they had won the double for the sixth time in the club's history.

During the winter break of their 2017–18 season Steffan left the club and signed for VfL Wolfsburg. During his two years with the club Steffan played a total of 112 games for Basel scoring a total of 23 goals. 61 of these games were in the Swiss Super League, seven in the Swiss Cup, 16 in the UEFA competitions (Champions League and Europa League) and 28 were friendly games. He scored 15 goal in the domestic league, two in the cup, two in the European games and the other four were scored during the test games.

=== Wolfsburg ===
On 10 January 2018, Steffen signed a three-and-a-half-year deal with VfL Wolfsburg. The transfer fee was reported as being €1.75 million. He scored the first Wolfsburg goal after the temporary cancellation of the Bundesliga because of the COVID-19 pandemic in Germany, against FC Augsburg with a header from the edge of the box.

=== Lugano ===
On 30 August 2022, Steffen signed a three-year contract with Lugano.

== International career ==
Steffen made his first appearance for Switzerland on 9 October 2015, in a Euro 2016 qualifier against San Marino. He was subbed on in the 78th minute of a 7–0 victory.

In May 2019, Steffen played in the 2019 UEFA Nations League Finals, where his team finished fourth. He then started for Switzerland against Germany in a 2020–21 UEFA Nations League match.

Steffen was forced to sit out of UEFA Euro 2020, due to injury. Following the tournament, he returned to the national team and was frequently chosen in the starting lineup for 2022 World Cup qualifying matches. On 12 October 2021, Steffen scored his first international goal for Switzerland against Lithuania.

On 9 November 2022, he was announced as part of the final squad for the 2022 FIFA World Cup in Qatar. At the tournament itself he only had a brief appearance in their group game against Brazil, coming on in the last fifteen minutes of the game.

On 16 March 2023, he was included in Switzerland's squad for their initial matches of their upcoming UEFA Euro qualifying campaign. On 25 March 2023, he scored a hat-trick in Switzerland's 5–0 win over Belarus, in Novi Sad, Serbia.

== Career statistics ==
=== Club ===
As of match played 2 June 2024

Appearances and goals by club, season and competition
Club	Season	League			National cup (Note: Includes Swiss Cup, DFB-Pokal)		Continental		Other		Total	
Club	Season	Division	Apps	Goals	Apps	Goals	Apps	Goals	Apps	Goals	Apps	Goals
Thun	2012–13	Swiss Super League	19	4	3	0	—		—		22	4
Young Boys	2013–14	Swiss Super League	21	4	2	0	—		—		23	4
Young Boys	2014–15	Swiss Super League	34	9	2	1	11 (Note: Appearances in UEFA Europa League)	4	—		47	14
Young Boys	2015–16	Swiss Super League	12	3	2	0	0	0	—		14	3
Young Boys	Total		67	16	6	1	11	4	—		84	21
Basel	2015–16	Swiss Super League	16	7	—		4	0	—		20	7
Basel	2016–17	Swiss Super League	30	5	4	1	5 (Note: Appearances in UEFA Champions League)	1	—		39	7
Basel	2017–18	Swiss Super League	17	3	4	0	6	0	—		27	3
Basel	Total		63	15	8	1	15	1	—		86	17
VfL Wolfsburg	2017–18	Bundesliga	16	0	—		—		2 (Note: Appearances in Bundesliga relegation play-offs)	0	18	0
VfL Wolfsburg	2018–19	Bundesliga	31	5	3	0	—		—		34	5
VfL Wolfsburg	2019–20	Bundesliga	27	6	2	0	9	0	—		38	6
VfL Wolfsburg	2020–21	Bundesliga	21	5	4	0	3	0	—		28	5
VfL Wolfsburg	2021–22	Bundesliga	20	0	1	0	5	2	—		26	2
VfL Wolfsburg	Total		115	16	10	0	17	2	2	0	144	18
Lugano	2022–23	Swiss Super League	28	7	5	1	—		—		33	8
Lugano	2023–24	Swiss Super League	31	6	5	2	7 (Note: One appearance in UEFA Europa League, six appearances in UEFA Europa Conference League)	0	—		43	8
Lugano	Total		59	13	10	3	7	0	—		76	16
Career total			323	64	37	5	50	7	2	0	412	76

=== International ===
As of match played 8 September 2024

Appearances and goals by national team and year
National team	Year	Apps	Goals
Switzerland	2015	2	0
Switzerland	2016	3	0
Switzerland	2019	5	0
Switzerland	2020	4	0
Switzerland	2021	6	1
Switzerland	2022	9	0
Switzerland	2023	9	3
Switzerland	2024	3	0
Total		41	4

Scores and results list Switzerland's goal tally first, score column indicates score after each Steffen goal.

List of international goals scored by Renato Steffen
No.	Date	Venue	Opponent	Score	Result	Competition
1	12 October 2021	LFF Stadium, Vilnius, Lithuania	Lithuania	2–0	4–0	2022 FIFA World Cup qualification
2	25 March 2023	Karađorđe Stadium, Novi Sad, Serbia	Belarus	1–0	5–0	UEFA Euro 2024 qualifying
3	25 March 2023	Karađorđe Stadium, Novi Sad, Serbia	Belarus	2–0	5–0	UEFA Euro 2024 qualifying
4	25 March 2023	Karađorđe Stadium, Novi Sad, Serbia	Belarus	3–0	5–0	UEFA Euro 2024 qualifying

== Honours ==
Basel

- Swiss Super League: 2015–16, 2016–17
- Swiss Cup: 2016–17

Individual

- Swiss Super League Goal of the Year: 2014–15
- Swiss Super League Team of the Year: 2014–15, 2017–18
- Swiss Super League top assists provider: 2022–23 (shared)
