= 2014–15 Swiss Super League =

118th season of top-tier Swiss football

Swiss Super League
- Season: 2014–15
- Dates: 19 July 2014 – 29 May 2015
- Champions: Basel; 18th title
- Relegated: Aarau
- Champions League: Basel; Young Boys
- Europa League: Sion; Thun; Zürich; Vaduz
- Matches: 180
- Goals: 517 (2.87 per match)
- Top goalscorer: Shkëlzen Gashi (22 goals)
- Biggest home win: Basel 6–0 Aarau (4 April 2015)
- Biggest away win: Sion 0–5 Grasshopper Club Zürich (3 April 2015)
- Highest scoring: Luzern 6–2 St. Gallen (30 April 2015); Aarau 2–6 Luzern (3 May 2015); Sion 6–2 Young Boys (25 May 2015)
- Longest winning run: 6 games Basel
- Longest unbeaten run: 13 games Young Boys
- Longest winless run: 16 games Aarau
- Longest losing run: 5 games Sion; Zürich; St. Gallen
- Total attendance: 1,956,021
- Average attendance: 10,867
- All statistics correct as of 1 June 2015.

The 2014–15 Swiss Super League was the 118th season of top-tier football in Switzerland. It began on 19 July 2014 and ended on 29 May 2015. Basel successfully defended their title for a record sixth time in a row.

A total of 10 teams competed in the league, the 9 best teams from the 2013–14 season and the 2013–14 Swiss Challenge League champion FC Vaduz.

== Teams ==
=== Stadia and locations ===
Location of the 2014–15 Swiss Super League teams

| Club | Location | Stadium | Capacity |
|---|---|---|---|
| Aarau | Aarau | Stadion Brügglifeld | 9,249 |
| Basel | Basel | St. Jakob-Park | 38,512 |
| Grasshopper | Zürich | Letzigrund | 23,605 |
| Luzern | Lucerne | Swissporarena | 17,500 |
| Sion | Sion | Stade Tourbillon | 16,500 |
| St. Gallen | St. Gallen | AFG Arena | 19,694 |
| Thun | Thun | Arena Thun | 10,000 |
| Vaduz | (Liechtenstein) Vaduz | Rheinpark Stadion | 7,584 |
| Young Boys | Bern | Stade de Suisse | 31,783 |
| Zürich | Zürich | Letzigrund | 23,605 |

=== Personnel and kits ===
| Team | Manager | Captain | Kit manufacturer | Shirt sponsor |
|---|---|---|---|---|
| Aarau | (Switzerland) Raimondo Ponte | (Switzerland) Sandro Burki | Nike | Zehnder Group AG |
| Basel | (Portugal) Paulo Sousa | (Switzerland) Marco Streller | adidas | Novartis |
| Grasshopper | (Switzerland) Pierluigi Tami | (Switzerland) Vero Salatić | Puma | FROMM/adt innova |
| Luzern | (Germany) Markus Babbel | (Switzerland) Claudio Lustenberger | adidas | Otto's |
| Sion | (France) Didier Tholot | (Hungary) Vilmos Vanczák | Erreà | Les Fils Maye SA |
| St. Gallen | (Luxembourg) Jeff Saibene | (Switzerland) Philippe Montandon | Jako | St. Galler Kantonalbank |
| Thun | (Switzerland) Urs Fischer | (Switzerland) Roland Bättig | Nike | Panorama Center/Sky Work |
| Vaduz | (Switzerland) Giorgio Contini | (Liechtenstein) Franz Burgmeier | adidas | Liechtensteinische Landesbank |
| Young Boys | (Switzerland) Uli Forte | (Switzerland) Marco Wölfli | Jako | Honda |
| Zürich | (Switzerland) Urs Meier | (Tunisia) Yassine Chikhaoui | Nike | Netstream AG |

== League table ==
| Pos | Team | Pld | W | D | L | GF | GA | GD | Pts | Qualification or relegation |
|---|---|---|---|---|---|---|---|---|---|---|
| 1 | Basel (C) | 36 | 24 | 6 | 6 | 84 | 41 | +43 | 78 | Qualification for the Champions League third qualifying round |
| 2 | Young Boys | 36 | 19 | 9 | 8 | 64 | 45 | +19 | 66 | Qualification for the Champions League third qualifying round |
| 3 | Zürich | 36 | 15 | 8 | 13 | 55 | 48 | +7 | 53 | Qualification for the Europa League third qualifying round |
| 4 | Thun | 36 | 13 | 13 | 10 | 47 | 45 | +2 | 52 | Qualification for the Europa League second qualifying round |
| 5 | Luzern | 36 | 12 | 11 | 13 | 54 | 46 | +8 | 47 | |
| 6 | St. Gallen | 36 | 13 | 8 | 15 | 57 | 65 | −8 | 47 | |
| 7 | Sion | 36 | 12 | 9 | 15 | 47 | 48 | −1 | 45 | Qualification for the Europa League group stage (Note: Sion qualified for the UEFA Europa League group stage by winning the 2014–15 Swiss Cup.) |
| 8 | Grasshopper | 36 | 11 | 10 | 15 | 50 | 56 | −6 | 43 | |
| 9 | Vaduz | 36 | 7 | 10 | 19 | 28 | 59 | −31 | 31 | Qualification for the Europa League first qualifying round (Note: Vaduz qualified for the UEFA Europa League first qualifying round by winning the 2014–15 Liechtenstein Cup.) |
| 10 | Aarau (R) | 36 | 6 | 12 | 18 | 31 | 64 | −33 | 30 | Relegation to Swiss Challenge League |

Source: Swiss Super League
Rules for classification: 1) points; 2) goal difference; 3) number of goals scored
(C) Champions; (R) Relegated

== Results ==
=== First and Second Round ===
| Home \ Away | AAR | BAS | GCZ | LUZ | SIO | STG | THU | VAD | YB | ZÜR |
|---|---|---|---|---|---|---|---|---|---|---|
| Aarau | | 1–2 | 1–2 | 0–3 | 1–0 | 0–3 | 2–1 | 1–1 | 3–2 | 0–1 |
| Basel | 3–0 | | 2–0 | 3–0 | 1–1 | 0–2 | 1–1 | 3–1 | 3–1 | 4–1 |
| Grasshopper | 2–1 | 3–1 | | 3–2 | 0–0 | 3–0 | 2–3 | 0–1 | 0–1 | 1–3 |
| Luzern | 1–1 | 0–3 | 1–1 | | 1–1 | 1–2 | 0–0 | 0–0 | 1–2 | 1–1 |
| Sion | 2–2 | 2–3 | 3–3 | 3–1 | | 1–0 | 0–0 | 1–0 | 0–1 | 1–3 |
| St. Gallen | 2–2 | 2–1 | 3–0 | 2–1 | 2–0 | | 1–0 | 3–3 | 2–2 | 0–2 |
| Thun | 0–0 | 2–3 | 3–2 | 3–2 | 2–1 | 3–1 | | 1–0 | 0–1 | 2–1 |
| Vaduz | 1–0 | 0–4 | 1–1 | 1–1 | 1–0 | 2–2 | 0–1 | | 0–2 | 1–4 |
| Young Boys | 1–1 | 0–1 | 4–0 | 3–2 | 2–1 | 4–2 | 1–1 | 0–1 | | 2–1 |
| Zürich | 0–0 | 1–2 | 1–0 | 2–3 | 4–1 | 1–1 | 2–1 | 3–0 | 2–1 | |

Source: Swiss Super League
Legend: Blue = home team win; Yellow = draw; Red = away team win.

=== Third and Fourth Round ===
| Home \ Away | AAR | BAS | GCZ | LUZ | SIO | STG | THU | VAD | YB | ZÜR |
|---|---|---|---|---|---|---|---|---|---|---|
| Aarau | | 2–1 | 0–1 | 2–6 | 0–1 | 0–2 | 3–2 | 0–1 | 1–1 | 0–0 |
| Basel | 6–0 | | 2–0 | 1–2 | 1–1 | 4–3 | 3–0 | 1–0 | 0–0 | 5–1 |
| Grasshopper | 3–1 | 2–4 | | 1–0 | 0–0 | 2–0 | 0–0 | 1–1 | 2–2 | 0–2 |
| Luzern | 4–0 | 1–4 | 2–0 | | 3–0 | 6–2 | 0–0 | 2–0 | 1–1 | 0–1 |
| Sion | 1–0 | 0–1 | 0–5 | 2–2 | | 3–0 | 3–0 | 4–0 | 6–2 | 1–2 |
| St. Gallen | 5–1 | 2–2 | 1–1 | 0–0 | 0–1 | | 2–1 | 1–2 | 3–1 | 1–4 |
| Thun | 1–1 | 2–2 | 2–2 | 1–0 | 2–1 | 4–1 | | 4–0 | 0–0 | 2–2 |
| Vaduz | 0–2 | 1–3 | 0–1 | 0–2 | 0–2 | 3–1 | 1–1 | | 0–1 | 2–2 |
| Young Boys | 2–2 | 4–2 | 4–2 | 0–1 | 3–2 | 3–1 | 4–0 | 2–1 | | 3–0 |
| Zürich | 0–0 | 1–2 | 4–3 | 0–1 | 0–1 | 1–2 | 0–1 | 2–2 | 0–1 | |

Source: Swiss Super League
Legend: Blue = home team win; Yellow = draw; Red = away team win.

== Season statistics ==
As of 30 May 2015

=== Top scorers ===
| Rank | Player | Club | Goals |
|---|---|---|---|
| 1 | (Albania) Shkëlzen Gashi | Basel | 22 |
| 2 | (France) Guillaume Hoarau | Young Boys | 17 |
| 2 | (Switzerland) Marco Schneuwly | Luzern | 17 |
| 4 | (Senegal) Moussa Konaté | Sion | 16 |
| 5 | (Israel) Mu'nas Dabbur | Grasshopper | 13 |
| 6 | (Switzerland) Marco Streller | Basel | 12 |
| 6 | (Paraguay) Dario Lezcano | Luzern | 12 |
| 6 | (Finland) Berat Sadik | Thun | 12 |
| 9 | (Brazil) Caio Alves | Grasshopper | 11 |
| 10 | (Switzerland) Breel Embolo | Basel | 10 |
| 11 | (Cameroon) Franck Etoundi | Zürich | 9 |
| 11 | (Switzerland) Goran Karanović | St. Gallen | 9 |
| 11 | (Switzerland) Renato Steffen | Young Boys | 9 |

== Awards ==
=== Annual awards ===
| Award | Winner | Club |
|---|---|---|
| Player of the Season | (Albania) Shkelzen Gashi | Basel |
| «Mein Spieler» Fans' Player of the Year | (Switzerland) Breel Embolo | Basel |
| Young Player of the Season | (Switzerland) Breel Embolo | Basel |
| Coach of the Season | (Switzerland) Urs Fisher | Thun |
| Goal of the Season | (Switzerland) Renato Steffen | Young Boys |

Team of the Year
| Goalkeeper | (Czech Republic) Tomáš Vaclík (Basel) | | | |
| Defence | (Switzerland) Michael Lang (GC) | (Switzerland) Marek Suchý (Basel) | (Switzerland) Fabian Schär (Basel) | (Switzerland) Taulant Xhaka (Basel) |
| Midfield | (Switzerland) Marco Schönbächler (Zürich) | (Switzerland) Alexander Frei (Basel) | (Tunisia) Yassine Chikhaoui (Zürich) | (Switzerland) Renato Steffen (Young Boys) |
| Attack | (Albania) Shkëlzen Gashi (Basel) | | (Switzerland) Marco Streller (Zürich) | |

== Attendances ==
| # | Club | Average | % Change | Highest |
|---|---|---|---|---|
| 1 | Basel | 28,878 | 3,7% | 34,231 |
| 2 | Young Boys | 16,931 | -3,5% | 23,868 |
| 3 | St. Gallen | 13,334 | -0,4% | 17,457 |
| 4 | Luzern | 10,923 | -3,3% | 16,500 |
| 5 | Zürich | 9,389 | -1,8% | 16,302 |
| 6 | Sion | 7,978 | 30,3% | 12,500 |
| 7 | Thun | 6,324 | 12,8% | 9,516 |
| 8 | GCZ | 6,173 | -14,7% | 19,200 |
| 9 | Aarau | 4,585 | -15,3% | 6,261 |
| 10 | Vaduz | 4,152 | 186,8% | 6,733 |
