= Nicolas Gétaz =

Swiss footballer (born 1991)

Personal information
- Date of birth: 11 June 1991 (age 35)
- Place of birth: Morges, Switzerland
- Height: 1.82 m (5 ft 11 1/2 in)
- Position: Defender

Team information
- Current team: Bavois
- Number: 16

Youth career
- 2004–2009: Lausanne-Sport

Senior career*
Years	Team	Apps	(Gls)
2009–2012	Lausanne-Sport	11	(0)
2010	→ Yverdon-Sport (loan)	11	(0)
2011–2012	→ Nyon (loan)	23	(1)
2012–2014	Vaduz	15	(0)
2014	→ Le Mont (loan)	11	(1)
2014–2015	Le Mont	32	(3)
2015–2021	Lausanne-Sport	129	(9)
2021–2023	Yverdon-Sport	54	(2)
2023–	Bavois	36	(7)
- * Club domestic league appearances and goals as of 10 November 2024

Nicolas Gétaz (born 11 June 1991) is a Swiss professional footballer who plays for Bavois.

== Club career ==
On 20 July 2021, he returned to Yverdon-Sport, 11 years after his first stint with the club.

On 8 July 2023, Gétaz moved to Bavois in the third-tier Swiss Promotion League.
