= Anes Zverotić =

Montenegrin footballer

Personal information
- Date of birth: 1 October 1985 (age 41)
- Place of birth: SR Montenegro, Yugoslavia
- Height: 1.77 m (5 ft 10 in)
- Position: Striker

Senior career*
Years	Team	Apps	(Gls)
2001–2003	Wil	5	(0)
2003	Gossau	20	(9)
2004	Wil	5	(0)
2004	St. Gallen II	5	(2)
2005	Wil	7	(1)
2005–2006	Blau-Weiß Feldkirch	30	(8)
2006–2007	Herisau	27	(13)
2007–2008	Gossau	16	(3)
2008–2012	FC Tuggen		
2012–2013	Brühl		
2013–2015	Sirnach		
2015–2017	Tuggen		
2018–2019	Ebnat-Kappel		
- * Club domestic league appearances and goals

Anes Zverotić (born 1 October 1985) is a Montenegrin former footballer who played as a striker.

He played nine matches for FC Wil in the Swiss Super League.

== Personal life ==
He is the nephew of fellow professional footballer Elsad Zverotić.
