= Zlatko Hebib =

Swiss footballer (born 1990)

Personal information
- Full name: Zlatko Hebib
- Date of birth: 28 December 1990 (age 35)
- Place of birth: Dubrovnik, SR Croatia, SFR Yugoslavia
- Height: 1.85 m (6 ft 1 in)
- Position: Centre back

Youth career
- 1998–2007: Grasshopper Club Zürich

Senior career*
Years	Team	Apps	(Gls)
2007–2010	Grasshopper Club Zürich II	60	(2)
2010–2011	Yverdon-Sport FC	19	(1)
2011–2014	SV Babelsberg 03	70	(1)
2015–2016	FC Biel-Bienne	13	(0)
2015	→ Servette (loan)	4	(1)
2017	FC Winterthur	14	(0)
2017–2019	Stade Nyonnais	48	(3)
2019–2022	Rapperswil-Jona	26	(0)
2022–2023	FC Zürich II	6	(0)
Total		260	(8)

International career
	Switzerland U-19	5	(1)
	Switzerland U-20	1	(0)
- * Club domestic league appearances and goals as of 1 July 2023

Zlatko Hebib (born 28 December 1990) is a former Swiss footballer who lasted played for FC Zürich II.

== Career ==
Hebib was born in Dubrovnik, SR Croatia, SFR Yugoslavia, but moved to Switzerland at an early age. He joined Grasshopper Club Zürich as a 7-year old, coming through the ranks of the Swiss club, but not having made a first team appearance. After a season spent at Yverdon-Sport FC and four months spent without a team, Hebib joined SV Babelsberg 03 in November 2011. The Swiss youth international made his professional debut in the German 3. Liga in a 3–1 away win over VfR Aalen.

In July 2017, Hebib joined FC Stade Nyonnais. Two years later, he joined FC Rapperswil-Jona.
