= Sascha Amhof =

Swiss football referee (born 1980)

- Full name: Sascha Amhof
- Born: 4 March 1980 (age 46); Switzerland
- Other occupation: Project manager building application Grammar school teacher

Domestic
Years	League	Role
2008–	Swiss Challenge League	Referee
2011–	Swiss Super League	Referee

International
Years	League	Role
2013–	FIFA listed	Referee

Sascha Amhof (born 4 March 1980) is a Swiss professional football referee. He has been a full international for FIFA since 2013.
