= Nicolas Lüchinger =

Swiss footballer (born 1994)

Personal information
- Date of birth: 16 October 1994 (age 32)
- Place of birth: Oberriet, Switzerland
- Height: 1.74 m (5 ft 9 in)
- Position: Right-back

Youth career
- –2014: St. Gallen

Senior career*
Years	Team	Apps	(Gls)
2012–2014	St. Gallen II	61	(2)
2014–2016	Chiasso	47	(1)
2016–2017	Sion	36	(0)
2017–2023	St. Gallen	48	(2)
2018–2022	St. Gallen II	4	(0)
2022–2023	→ Thun (loan)	19	(1)

International career
2012–2013	Switzerland U19	5	(0)
- * Club domestic league appearances and goals

Nicolas Lüchinger (born 16 October 1994) is a Swiss former professional footballer who played as a right-back.

== Club career ==
Lüchinger made his Swiss Super League debut with FC Sion on 10 August 2016 against FC Lugano.

On 12 July 2022, Lüchinger joined Thun on a season-long loan.

Lüchinger announced retirement from playing in December 2023.
