= Karim Gazzetta =

Swiss footballer (1995–2022)

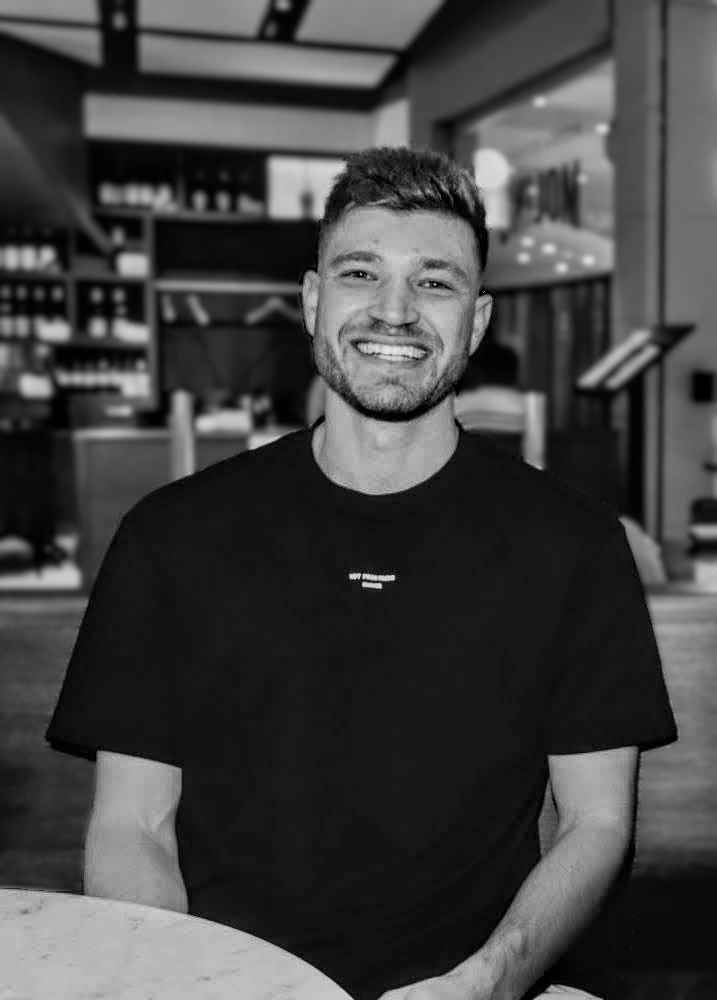

Personal information
- Full name: Karim Emilio Roberto Gazzetta
- Date of birth: 1 April 1995
- Place of birth: Geneva, Switzerland
- Date of death: 21 November 2022 (aged 27)
- Place of death: Mostar, Bosnia and Herzegovina
- Height: 1.79 m (5 ft 10 in)
- Position: Midfielder

Youth career
- 2007–2013: Servette

Senior career*
Years	Team	Apps	(Gls)
2013–2014	Servette	1	(0)
2014	→ Etoile Carouge	10	(2)
2014–2016	Servette	50	(4)
2016–2019	Winterthur	66	(6)
2019–2021	Stade Lausanne Ouchy	60	(10)
2021–2022	Neuchâtel Xamax	29	(4)
2022	Zrinjski Mostar	1	(0)
Total		217	(26)
- * Club domestic league appearances and goals

Karim Emilio Roberto Gazzetta (1 April 1995 – 21 November 2022) was a Swiss professional footballer who played as a midfielder.

== Club career ==
Gazzetta had played for Servette FC since he was young. In 2013, he received his first professional contract, also due to various poaching attempts by domestic and foreign clubs. He made his debut in the first team on 22 July 2013. For the second half of 2014, he played at Étoile Carouge FC in the Promotion League while on loan, then switched back to Servette. At the end of September 2016, he was transferred to FC Winterthur, where he was injured just a few days after the move and was only able to train with Winterthur again after the winter break.

In the 2019–20 season as well as in 2020–21, Gazzetta played for FC Stade Lausanne-Ouchy. In June 2021, he moved to Neuchâtel Xamax. For the 2022–23 season, Gazzetta joined the Bosnian football club HŠK Zrinjski Mostar who were the defending champions.

== International career ==
Gazzetta played for the Switzerland junior national teams up to U20.

== Death ==
On 21 November 2022, Gazzetta had an accident and fell from the eighth floor of a building in Mostar, Bosnia and Herzegovina. The local police department conducted a series of investigations at the site of his death.

== Honours ==
Servette

- 1. Liga Promotion: 2015–16
