= Urs Fischer (footballer) =

Swiss footballer and manager (born 1966)

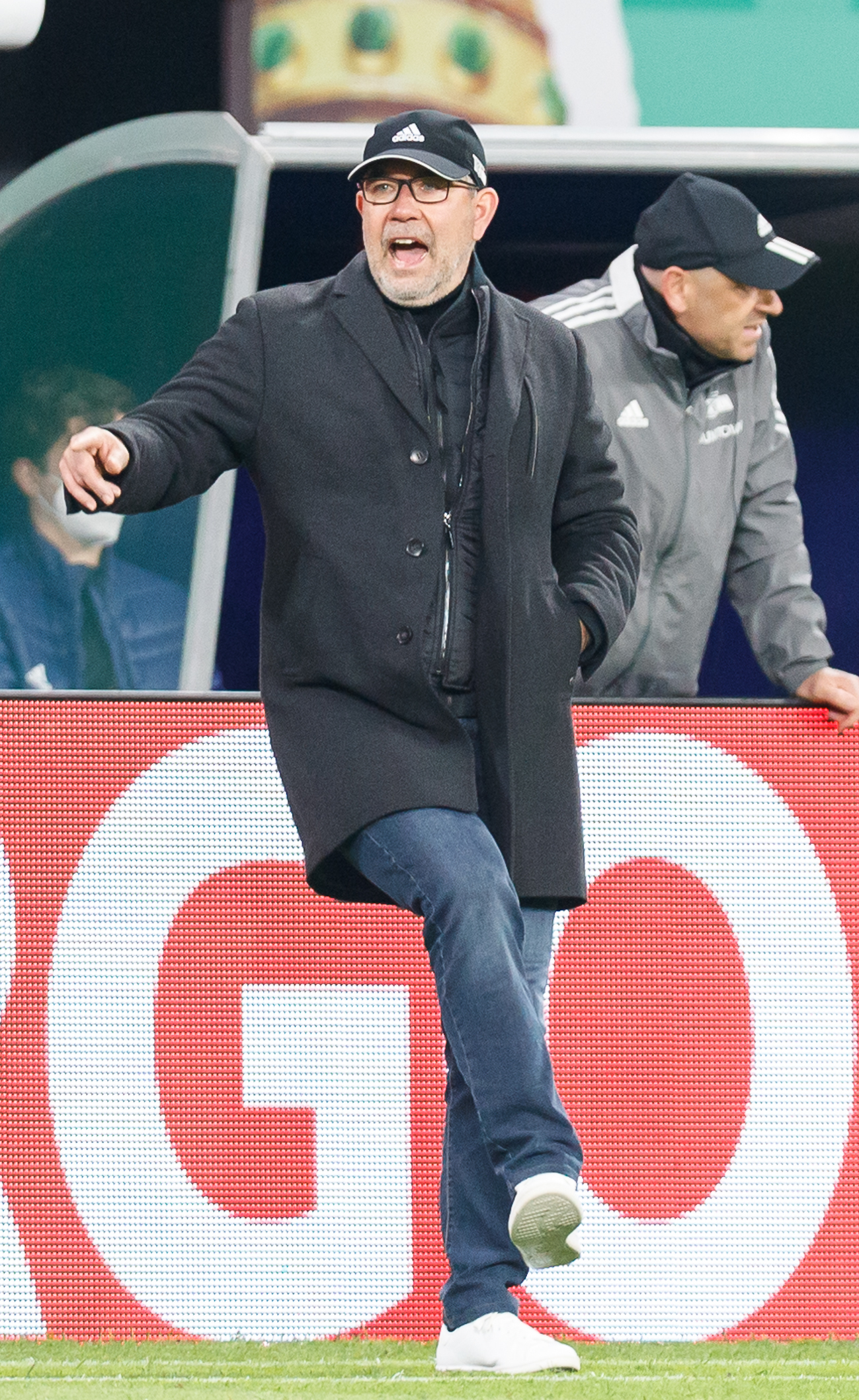
- Fischer managing Union Berlin in 2022

Personal information
- Date of birth: 20 February 1966 (age 60)
- Place of birth: Triengen, Switzerland
- Height: 1.78 m (5 ft 10 in)
- Position: Centre-back

Team information
- Current team: Mainz 05 (head coach)

Youth career
- 1973–1984: Zürich

Senior career*
Years	Team	Apps	(Gls)
1984–1987	Zürich	49	(1)
1987–1995	St. Gallen	243	(10)
1996–2003	Zürich	253	(4)
Total		545	(15)

International career
1989–1991	Switzerland	4	(0)

Managerial career
- 2010–2012: Zürich
- 2013–2015: Thun
- 2015–2017: Basel
- 2018–2023: Union Berlin
- 2025–: Mainz 05
- * Club domestic league appearances and goals

Urs Fischer (born 20 February 1966) is a Swiss football manager and former player, who is the head coach of Bundesliga club Mainz 05.

As a manager he has won two Swiss Super League titles with Basel in 2016 and 2017. He then took over at Union Berlin in 2018, and guided the club to their first ever UEFA Champions League qualification in 2023.

== Playing career ==
During his playing career, Fischer only played for two clubs: Zürich and St. Gallen. He was captain of both teams, and is the all-time leading player with 545 caps in the Swiss Super League. He started his career in the youth department of Zürich and played his first game as professional 7 April 1984 aged 18 in a 6–1 loss against Sion. His only title is the win of the Swiss Cup 2000. Fischer played four national caps for Switzerland under coach Uli Stielike.

== Coaching career ==
=== Zürich ===
Fischer quit playing professional football in 2003. He then coached the U-14, U-16 and U-21-teams of Zürich. After a short spell as the assistant manager to Bernard Challandes in 2007–08, he returned to the U-21. When Challandes was sacked, Fischer was appointed as caretaker 17 April 2010 and after three games, which he all lost, became permanent manager. He finished the 2010–11 season with FC Zürich second behind Basel. He was sacked by FC Zürich in 2012 following a poor league finish, his replacement Rolf Fringer would not last much longer, with a fellow coach under Fisher in Urs Meier being brought in to coach Zürich for the remainder of 2013.

=== Thun ===
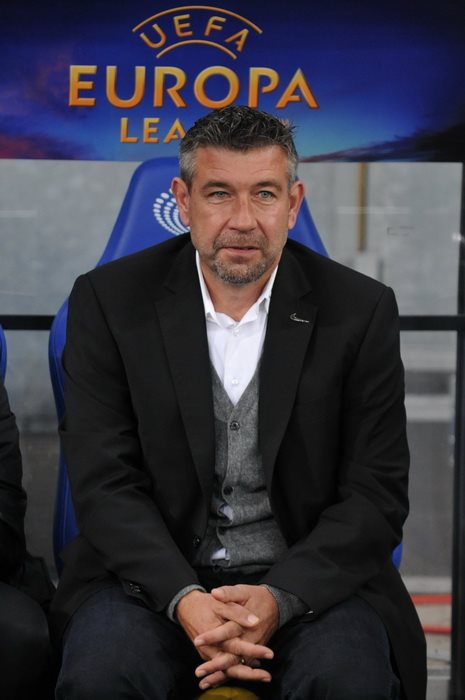
Fischer as manager of Thun in 2013

Fischer became a head coach at Thun during the 2012–13 season, where they finished in the fifth place and qualified to the 2013–14 UEFA Europa League qualifying rounds, until they reached the group stage for the first time in history. He was voted manager of the year in Switzerland in 2014. In the 2014–15 season, Thun finished fourth in the league to qualify to next season's Europa League qualifying rounds.

=== Basel ===
On 18 June 2015, Basel announced that Fischer had signed a two-year contract as first team manager. On 10 April 2017, the newly established Basel management announced that they would not extend his contract.

=== Union Berlin ===
Fischer was announced as new head coach of 2. Bundesliga side Union Berlin on 1 June 2018, signing a two-year contract with the club. In his first season with the club, he led Union to a historical promotion in Bundesliga after a third-place finish that enabled them to participate in the promotion play-offs, where they beat Stuttgart on away goals. In December 2020, he signed a contract extension, keeping him at the club until 2023. In the 2020–21 season, he led Union to a seventh-place finish, thus qualifying for the inaugural UEFA Europa Conference League edition. In the 2021–22 season, he led Union to a fifth-place finish, thus qualifying for the UEFA Europa League for the first time ever in history. In September 2022, he extended his contract with the club beyond 2023. In the 2022–23 season, Union Berlin finished fourth in the league to qualify for the Champions League group stage, to be their first participation in history. In August 2023, he was voted Football Manager of the Year in Germany. On 15 November 2023, after a bad start to the season including 14 winless competitive matches in a row, Fischer and Union Berlin decided to separate by “mutual agreement”.

=== Mainz ===
In December 2025, he was named as the new head coach of Mainz 05.

== Personal life ==
Fischer is married and has two daughters. His older daughter Riana played for Zürich Frauen from 2010 to 2022.

== Managerial statistics ==
As of match played 22 November 2026

Managerial record by team and tenure
Team	From	To	Record							
Team	From	To	G	W	D	L	GF	GA	GD	Win %
Zürich	19 April 2010	12 March 2012	152	107	19	26	146	108	+38	70.39
Thun	1 January 2013	17 June 2015	112	46	30	36	158	137	+21	41.07
Basel	18 June 2015	2 June 2017	102	68	20	14	234	108	+126	66.67
Union Berlin	1 June 2018	15 November 2023	224	95	58	71	324	291	+33	42.41
Mainz 05	7 December 2025	Present	39	16	10	13	68	58	+10	41.03
Total			629	332	137	160	928	702	+226	52.78

== Honours ==
=== As player ===
Zürich

- Swiss Cup: 1999–2000

=== As manager ===
Basel

- Swiss Super League: 2015–16, 2016–17
- Swiss Cup: 2016–17

Individual

- Manager of the Year in Switzerland: 2014
- VDV Bundesliga Coach of the Season: 2022–23
- Football Manager of the Year in Germany: 2023
