= 2015–16 FC Basel season =

FC Basel
2015–16 season
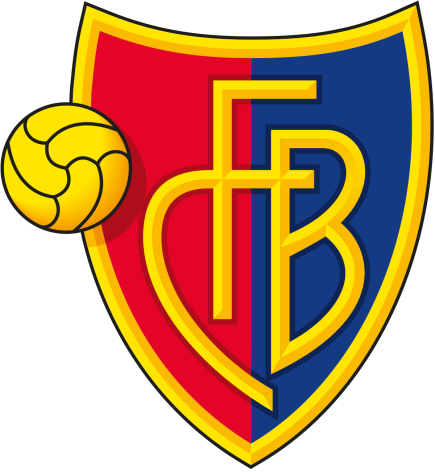
- Owner: FCB Holding AG
- Chairman: Bernhard Heusler
- Manager: Urs Fischer
- Ground: St. Jakob-Park, Basel, Switzerland
- Super League: 1st
- Swiss Cup: Quarter-finals
- Champions League: Play-off round
- Europa League: Round of 16
- Top goalscorer: League: Marc Janko (16); All: Marc Janko (21)
- Highest home attendance: Swiss League: 33,360 vs. Young Boys (25 October 2015); Champions League: 18,200 vs. Lech Poznań (5 August 2015); Europa League: 22,550 vs. Fiorentina (26 November 2015)
- Lowest home attendance: Swiss League: 24,558 vs. Thun (10 May 2016); Champions League: 15,620 vs. Maccabi Tel Aviv (19 August 2015); Europa League: 17,275 vs. Belenenses (22 October 2015)
Home colours	Away colours

The 2015–16 FC Basel season was the club's 123rd season and their 21st consecutive season in the top flight of Swiss football since their promotion in the 1993–94 season. Basel's 2015–16 Swiss Super League campaign began on 19 July at home against Vaduz. In addition to the Swiss Super League, Basel also participated in the season's Champions League, Europa League, and Swiss Cup.

== Club ==
=== FC Basel Holding AG ===
FC Basel Holding AG is a holding company that owns 75% of FC Basel 1893 AG. The club itself owns the other 25%. FC Basel 1893 AG is responsible for all decisions that affect FC Basel as a club, including the operational business, youth department, and back office.

=== Club management ===
The FC Basel AGM took place on 27 April 2015 in Basel's congress center, comprising

Chairman	(Switzerland) Bernhard Heusler
Vice Chairman	(Switzerland) Adrian Knup
Finances	(Switzerland) Stephan Werthmüller
Sportdirector	(Switzerland) Georg Heitz
Marketing	(Switzerland) René Kamm
Director	(Switzerland) Reto Baumgartner
Director	(Switzerland) Dominik Donzé
Director	(Switzerland) Benno Kaiser
Ground (capacity and dimensions)	St. Jakob-Park (38,512 (37,500 for international matches) / 120x80 m)

Updated to match played 27 April 2015
Source: FCB Official Site

=== Team management ===
On 18 June 2015 Basel announced Urs Fischer's appointment as the first team head coach on a three-year contract. His assistants were Marco Walker and Markus Hoffmann. Furthermore, Massimo Colomba stayed on the team as the goalkeeping coach in addition to his position as the head of the FCB Youth System. Thomas Häberli was the coach of the youth team (U-21) until October. Due to poor results, he was asked to step back, after which Massimo Ceccaroni coached the team.

Position	Staff
Manager	(Switzerland) Urs Fischer (since 18 June 2015)
1 Assistant manager	(Switzerland) Marco Walker
2 Assistant manager	(Austria) Markus Hoffmann
Goalkeeper Coach	(Switzerland) Massimo Colomba
Team Administration	(Switzerland) Gustav Nussbaumer
Youth Team Coach	(Switzerland) Thomas Häberli (Switzerland) Massimo Ceccaroni (since October 2015)
Youth Team Co-Coach	(Switzerland) Roland Heri

Last updated: 1 July 2015
Source: FCB Official Site

== Overview ==
=== Off-season and pre-season ===
Team captain Marco Streller retired from professional football at the end of the 2014–15 season. Between 2000 and 2004 and from 2007 to 2015, Streller played 418 games for Basel, scoring 185 goals. Two hundred thirty-three of these games were in the Swiss Super League, 22 in the Swiss Cup, 70 in UEFA European competitions (Champions League, UEFA Cup Europa League, and UIC), and 93 were friendly games. He scored 111 goals in the domestic league, 9 in the domestic cup, 24 in European competitions, and the other 41 were scored during test games.

In addition to Streller, another six first-team players departed at the end of the season: Derlis González to Dynamo Kyiv, Fabian Schär to 1899 Hoffenheim, Fabian Frei to Mainz 05, Serey Die to VfB Stuttgart, and Giovanni Sio to Rennes, while Arlind Ajeti's contract expired.

New arrivals included Michael Lang from Grasshopper, Daniel Høegh from Odense, Zdravko Kuzmanović from Internazionale, and Manuel Akanji from FC Winterthur. Marc Janko signed on a free transfer from Sydney FC, and Mirko Salvi returned from loan to FC Biel-Bienne.

Matías Delgado was named the new captain, and Marek Suchý was named vice-captain.

=== Mid-season break and Squad Changes ===
During the winter break, there were several changes in the squad. On 14 January 2014, Ivan Ivanov sustained a knee injury in a friendly match against Eintracht Braunschweig, causing him to miss the rest of the 2013–14 season, which extended into the 2014–15 season. On 15 December 2015, while recovering from injury, he was released from the club by mutual consent. Zdravko Kuzmanović was sent on loan to Udinese. Shkelzen Gashi, the previous season's top scorer, moved to the Colorado Rapids. Albian Ajet was transferred to FC Augsburg. Yoichiro Kakitani was transferred to Cerezo Osaka. One notable transfer was midfielder Mohamed Elneny's departure to English Premier League side Arsenal.

Elneny's departure spurred further changes, signing three midfield players. On 8 December 2015, the club announced Andraž Šporar's arrival from Olimpija Ljubljana. On 2 January 2016, the club announced the signing of Alexander Fransson from IFK Norrköping. Lastly, on 12 January, Renato Steffen from Young Boys joined. All three of these signings were four-and-a-half-year contracts.

== The campaign ==
=== Domestic League ===
First half of season

Basel's 2015–16 Swiss Super League season began with a victory at home against Vaduz on 18 July. Basel started the season well, winning each of their first eight matches; scoring 22 goals, and conceding 7. They suffered their first defeat in Stade de Suisse 3–4 against Young Boys. After their first defeat in the domestic campaign, they won four of their next five games; with a draw against Zürich in Letzigrund, where the final score was 2–2. Basel suffered their first home defeat of the campaign at the beginning of November against GC. By the winter break, Basel led the league table with 43 points, 10 points ahead of the Grasshoppers, and 15 ahead of the Young Boys.

Second half of season

Basel started the second half of the season with three straight wins, a 3–0 against Luzern, 4–0 away against GC, and 5–1 at home against Vaduz. In the first 15 games of the second half of the season, they won 11 and drew 4. On matchday 31, 30 April, the home win against Sion gave Basel a 16-point lead in the league table with just five matches left to play. Basel ended the last part of the season with two defeats in their last three games. The domestic season concluded with Basel winning the championship, Young Boys in second, Luzern third, and Zürich suffering relegation.

Conclusion

Basel's final point tally for the season was 83, which was 14 points more than young boys in second, and 29 more than Luzern in third. Basel won 26 games, drawing five, and losing five. They managed to score 88 league goals while conceding 38. Marc Janko was the team's top scorer with 16 goals in 20 outings, and he scored a hattrick during their 4–2 home victory against Zürich. Team captain Matías Delgado was the second-top goal scorer with 11 goals and had the most assists on the team with 12. Luca Zuffi made the most appearances, he played all 36 league games.

=== Swiss Cup ===
Basel's objective for the 2015–16 Swiss Cup was to win the cup. They finished second place in each of the previous three seasons: In 2013 against GC, in 2014 against Zürich, and in 2015 against Sion.

Meyrin (15 August 2015)

In the first round, Basel was drawn away against FC Meyrin, who at that time played in the 2. Liga Interregional, the fifth tier of Swiss football. The match was played in Stade des Arberes, with an attendance of 2,100 spectators. Around the 34th minute, Matías Delgado headed a ball to Albian Ajeti, who connected with the ball through a left-footed shot, making it 1–0. Shkëlzen Gashi's pass to Mohamed Elneny opened the midfielder up to make the score 2–0. Just 60 seconds later Elneny on the right passed inside to Ajeti, assisting him in scoring his second goal that evening, and making it 3–0. Another two minutes later, Philipp Degen's low cross came to Delgado who then added to Basel's three-goal lead. The match concluded with Basel winning 4–0 and advancing to the next round.

YF Juventus (20 September 2015)

In round 2, Basel was drawn away against YF Juventus. Due to safety reasons, the match was played at St. Jakob-Park with an attendance of 4,606 spectators. It was a special game for Luca Zuffi as he played for Basel; his two brothers (Sandro and Nico) played for YF Juventus. 15 minutes into the match, Matías Delgado pushed a diagonal pass to the right, and Davide Callà connected with a right-footed shot to put Basel a goal up. Half an hour into the match Basel went up 2–0 with a cross from Callà on the right, which was complemented by Delgado's run to the far post to nod the ball home. Following a goal kick at 50 minutes, Nico Zuffi and Kakitani connected to make it 3–0. In the final actions of the match, Walter Samuel committed a foul. Samuel was given a yellow card, and YF Juventus were awarded a penalty by referee Alain Bieri. Mychell Ruan Da Silva Chagas converted the penalty kick, and the final score was 4–1 to Basel, advancing to the third round.

Muttenz (28 October 2015)

In the third round, Basel played against local amateur team SV Muttenz, the first time that the two sides played against each other in a competitive match. At that time Muttenz played in the 2. Liga Interregional, the fifth tier of Swiss football. The match was played at the Margelacker, with a stadium record attendance of 5,800. Shkëlzen Gashi, set up Daniel Hoegh's 1–0 after 25 minutes. Gashi himself went on to score a hat-trick in the match, his goals came at the 35th, 62nd, and 72nd-minute mark. Immediately after the break, Muttenz responded by converting a penalty, awarded through Manuel Akanji's foul on Thomas Eggenberger. In the 75th minute, Albian Ajeti converted a penalty kick to make the final score 5–1, advancing to the quarterfinal.

FC Sion (13 December 2015)

In the quarterfinal, Basel played away against FC Sion, the same team they lost to in the previous season's final. The match was played in the Stade Tourbillon with an attendance of 9,200 spectators. The match allowed Basel the opportunity to redeem their defeat in the previous season's final. Sion went 1–0 up in the 37th minute, from a goal by Pa Modou, and in the 66th minute, Ebenezer Assifuah added a second. In the 79th minute, Elneny converted a free kick to make it 2–1. In the 89th minute referee Stephan Klossner awarded Basel a penalty after a duel between Léo Lacroix and Breel Embolo, Marc Janko scored the penalty kick. In extra time, the score remained tied, leading to a penalty shootout. Reto Ziegler missed for Sion, but Birkir Bjarnason and Walter Samuel both missed for Basel. Sion advanced to the semi-final 4–3 on penalties.

Conclusion

Sion were beaten 3–0 by FC Zürich in the semi-final. FC Zürich faced Lugano in the final, beating them 1–0, FC Zürich were crowned champions.

From the FCB's point of view, the domestic cup campaign was a disappointment due to not meeting the set goal. Additionally, It was their fifth defeat of the season, and their second season of getting knocked out by FC Sion in the domestic cup.

=== Champions League ===
Basel entered the season's Champions League in the third qualifying round. The draw for the third qualifying round was held on 17 July 2015, and Basel was drawn against the Polish site Lech Poznań.

Lech Poznań (29 July 2015)

The first leg was played in Poznan at the INEA Stadion with an attendance of 25,478 spectators. The home team had the first two proper chances of the game. Nevertheless, Basel took the lead in the 24th minute, and Michael Lang headed the ball home from a corner by Luca Zuffi. Just two minutes later, Poznań equalized with a header from Denis Thomalla. At the 66th-minute mark, Lech defender Tomasz Kędziora saw a red card as he brought down Bjarnason in the box. Basel was awarded a penalty; nevertheless, keeper Jasmin Burić saved Shkëlzen Gashi's penalty. Right around the 77th-minute mark, Marc Janko hammered a loose ball home to give Basel the lead. In the 2nd minute of injury time, Davide Callà scored a goal. The final score concluded with a 3–1 win for Basel in Poznan.

The second leg was played in Basel at St. Jakob-Park, on 5 August, with an attendance of 18,196. The 3–1 cushion from the first leg meant coach Urs Fischer's team could afford breathing space in the second leg. Most of the match was uneventful due to Basel's pragmatic approach to the match, and Poznan's inability to break them down. Nevertheless, Birkir Bjarnason's goal in the final minutes of the match gave Basel a 1–0 lead and sealed the victory. To conclude, Basel advanced to the next round with an aggregate score of 4–1 over two legs.

Maccabi Tel Aviv (19 August 2015)

The draw for the play-off round was held on 7 August 2015. Basel was drawn against Maccabi Tel Aviv. Both of the teams played each other twice in the 2013–14 season, once in the Champions League and after in the Europa League. Basel won on both occasions. The first leg of the tie was held at St. Jakob-Park with an attendance of 15,620 spectators. Basel started well, and was on top early. However, Marc Janko was injured in the 12th minute and was replaced by Shkëlzen Gashi. Maccabi Tel Aviv went 1–0 up in the 31st minute from Avi Rikan's free kick. In the final minutes of the first half, defender Tal Ben Haim fouled Delgado in the box. Basel was awarded a penalty, and Delgado converted to even things out at 1–1. At the 88th-minute mark, Breel Embolo put Basel in the lead by connecting with a pass from Elneny. Nevertheless, Maccabi was not done, six minutes into injury time Zahavi headed the ball home from Dor Micha's cross to make it 2–2. The final score in Basel concluded with a 2–2 draw.

Following the 2–2 draw at St. Jakob-Park, Basel needed a win away from home at the Bloomfield Stadium. The match was played on 19 August, with an attendance of 13,350 spectators. Early into the first half, Luca Zuffi's free kick put Basel up 1–0. However, Basel's lead did not last for too long. Nikola Mitrović's through ball found Eran Zahavi, Zahavi outran Walter Samuel, and his shot beat Tomáš Vaclík at the near post. Basel dominated for the rest of the match but failed to find the much-anticipated goal. The final aggregate score in Maccabi concluded with a 3–3 draw, Maccabi advanced due to an away goals advantage.

Conclusion

From Basel's point of view, the Champions League campaign was disappointing as they missed their first objective of the season which was to participate in the season's Champions League group stage. However, their hopes for European glory were not diminished, due to getting an entry into the seasons Europa league.

=== Europa League ===
Because Basel failed to qualify for the Champions League group stage, they dropped into the 2015–16 UEFA Europa League group stage. The draw was held on 28 August 2015 at the Grimaldi Forum in Monaco and Basel was drawn into Group I, together with Fiorentina, Lech Poznań, and Belenenses. The club's aim for the team was to remain in the competition over the winter break, preferably as group winner or otherwise in the second position, and thus advance to the knockout phase.

Fiorentina (17 September 2015)

Basel's first game on matchday 1 was played away at the Stadio Artemio Franchi in Florence with an attendance of 15,212 spectators. Fiorentina's new first-team manager was Basel's ex-manager, Paulo Sousa. Both teams started well, but the guests were quicker to deliver. Nikola Kalinić scored a goal in the fourth minute for Fiorentina, and despite being put under constant pressure by the visitors, they held on to the lead until well into the second half of the game. Fiorentina captain Gonzalo Rodríguez was sent off after 66 minutes. The Argentine saw the red card for his hard foul against Breel Embolo far away from his own goal, and therefore, his tackle was unnecessary. Following his dismissal, FCB took charge and succeeded in scoring the equalizer. Birkir Bjarnason beat home goalkeeper Luigi Sepe on 71 minutes with a low drive from 15 meters out. Eight minutes later, Mohamed Elneny sealed the fightback after a good build-up. His super-rising drive from outside the box completed the comeback success. With this 2–1 win, Basel extended their unbeaten run to five matches in Europe this term.

Lech Poznań (1 October 2015)

Matchday 2 was the first home game in the Europa League group stage and was against Lech Poznań, who had been opponents in the Champions League qualifying earlier in the season. Lech's Swiss midfielder Darko Jevtić was signed from Basel after a successful loan spell. The then 22-year-old was born in Basel and came through the youth ranks at the Swiss club. This was his second visit to the St. Jakob-Park and his second appearance for Lech, he had played double the number of times here for Lech as he had for FCB. The match was played in front of 17,567 spectators. The first half passed without much action, but the home team dominated. Icelandic midfielder Birkir Bjarnason brought a long ball down with his chest at the edge of the penalty area, kept his balance under pressure, and then turned a good finish past keeper Maciej Gostomski to give the hosts the lead after 55 minutes. In the 90th minute, Luca Zuffi made a cross from the right, Marc Janko controlled the ball with his chest and laid off for the waiting Breel Embolo, who finished with a powerful low volley. The final score of 2–0 was a deserved result.

Belenenses (22 October 2015)

The third game in the group stage was the home match against Belenenses. 17,275 fans were in the St. Jakob-Park on a cloudy evening. Basel took an early lead after 15 minutes, Matías Delgado delivered an inswinging corner kick toward the back post from the left and Michael Lang jumped highest to power his header into the goal from five meters out. Belenenses leveled after 27 minutes with their first chance. A long ball forward was headed clear by Marek Suchý, but it dropped to Luís Leal, who was 25 meters from the goal. He hammered a low volley into the bottom corner and the ball bounced high to evade the dive of Germano Vailati. During the extra time of the first half, Leal ran clear on the right flank, rushed into the penalty area, and played the ball beyond Vailati across the face of the goal to Kuca Miranda who had the simplest of finishes, tapping into the unguarded goal from just three meters. During the second half, Basel played forward non-stop, they created opportunities but were unable to score the equalizer. Up until this 1–2 defeat, Basel had been unbeaten this season, with nine games in the domestic league and six in Europe.

Belenenses (5 November 2015)

The return game against Belenenses on matchday 4 was played in Estádio do Restelo with an attendance of 4,802 spectators two weeks after the home game. The referee was Tamás Bognár of the Hungarian Football Federation. Basel took early command; a first chance came from Breel Embolo nine minutes into the match, after good dribbling, he hit the post. Basel continued to dominate their opponents with good moves but did not create good goal-scoring opportunities. It was not until near halftime that their efforts were rewarded. In the 44th-minute, Embolo was fouled in the penalty area by Filipe Ferreira, and Marc Janko scored from the spot. The Austrian international striker missed the next first-class chance in the 52nd-minute solo in front of the well-parring keeper Hugo Ventura. Embolo himself scored the second goal after being played free by Luca Zuffi's long deep pass into the penalty box which was flicked on by Janko. With this 2–0 victory, Basel avenged their matchday-three loss. Basel took command of the table and left Belenenses on the brink of elimination.

Fiorentina (26 November 2015)

Matchday 5 was Basel's third and last home match in the Europa League group stage was the return game against Fiorentina. Paulo Sousa returned to St. Jakob-Park, but this time to the visitors' bench. Basel's first-choice goalkeeper Tomáš Vaclík injured himself shortly before kick-off and the new head coach Urs Fischer was forced to replace him. Fischer chose Germano Vailati and left Mirko Salvi on the bench. Basel had a nervous start to the game and Federico Bernardeschi ended his run of 11 games without a goal with a first-half double. The first came at 23 minutes. Jean-Paul Boëtius was put under pressure by three players, he lost the ball and the guests quickly switched over and Bernardeschi shot home after a clever through pass to make it 1–0. The second came on 36 minutes, a bad goal-kick by keeper Vailati was won by Fiorentina's midfield, 3/4 quick passes, and Bernardeschi side-footed home to give Fiorentina a two-goal lead. After 26 minutes, Facundo Roncaglia was punished with a red card by referee Ivan Kružliak from the Slovak Football Association after slamming his elbow into Breel Embolo's face. Basel fought their way back into the game, with Marek Suchý cutting the gap in the 40th minute. After a corner Luca Zuffi played a cross into the box, Embolo's header was parried by Luigi Sepe, but Suchý pushed the rebound in. Fiorentina defended the 2–1 lead largely sovereign, despite the visual superiority of the home team. There was a certain logic behind the fact that the FCB equalized following a standard. Following a corner, Mohamed Elneny equalized, at 74 minutes, from long range. Basel recovered after being two down to make it a 2–2 draw. Basel fought back to hold ten-man Fiorentina and stand three points above them in the group table.

Lech Poznań (10 December 2015)

Basel was certain to finish top of the group before matchday six. For their last match, they had to travel to the INEA Stadion in Poznań. Lech Poznań had already lost to Basel three times this season and only a win would have given them any chance of making it through Group I. Unable to play were four Basel defenders, Manuel Akanji, Philipp Degen, and Daniel Høegh due to injury and Marek Suchý was out suspended. Walter Samuel was nominated, playing this match, he made his 100th UEFA club competition appearance, a landmark evening for the veteran defender. Reserve goalkeeper Germano Vailati was again Basel's starter because of first-choice goalkeeper Tomáš Vaclík's injury. In the 44th minute, Vailati injured himself as he played a long pass forward. Therefore, before half-time third-choice goalkeeper Mirko Salvi was substituted in and made his professional debut for the club. Adonis Ajeti also made his debut for the club after coming on as a substitute at half-time to replace Michael Lang. Jean-Paul Boëtius scored the only goal five minutes after half-time, it was his first goal for the Swiss champions. FCB owed the victory to Jean-Paul Boëtius, Taulant Xhaka, and reserve keeper Salvi. Boëtius, because the Dutchman scored the 1–0 in the 50th minute, Xhaka because of his remarkable preparation down the right wing, and Salvi because he prevented Lech from equalizing with a strong one-on-one action a quarter of an hour before the end of the game.

Conclusion

Basel ended this stage as group winners and Fiorentina were runners-up and both advanced to the knockout phase which started in February 2016. As group winners, Basel was seeded, but Fiorentina was not. The draw for the round of 32 was held on 14 December 2015. Fiorentina was drawn against Tottenham Hotspur, but with a draw at home and a defeat at White Hart Lane, this meant they were eliminated.

From the FCB point of view, as group winners, their aim was positively achieved. Their next aim was to remain in the competition for at least another round or perhaps two. Basel was drawn against the French site Saint-Étienne. The first leg was played on 18 February at 19:00 and the return leg in the St. Jakob-Park was played on 25 February 2016 at 21:05.

Saint-Étienne (18 February 2016)

The first leg of the round of 32 was played in the Stade Geoffroy-Guichard with an attendance of 27,013 fans against Saint-Étienne, but without Basel supporters due to the high-security alert following the terror attacks in Paris two months earlier. Basel went behind early, but came back from being two goals down, but ended up losing the match. Moustapha Sall in the fifth minute, following a free kick from the right that was flicked on to the far post, headed the ball across the goal and it bounced from the post first along and then over the line. Then Kévin Monnet-Paquet in the 39th minute headed a corner over Basel keeper Tomáš Vaclík into the net, to put the hosts 2–0 in the lead. Walter Samuel started Basel's fight-back just before half-time in the 44th minute, becoming the second-oldest goal scorer in the UEFA Europa League at age 37 years and 332 days; he is surpassed only by Molde FK's Daniel Hestad, who scored at age 40 years and 98 days in this season's group stage. A free kick on Basel's right flank was chested down by Breel Embolo and Walter Samuel, in falling, kicked the ball right-footed into the net. Soon after the break in the 56th minute, Marc Janko, via a penalty, put Basel level, and the guests continually pressed for their third goal. However, after a long clearance defender, Jean-Christophe Bahebeck scored for the home team in the 79th minute, against the run of play, to make the final score 3–2 in favour of Saint-Étienne.

Return match (25 February 2016)

The return game was played a week later in the St. Jakob-Park with an attendance of 20,976 fans. Basel had to win to qualify for the next round, which was very apparent as Basel played forwards immediately and levelled the aggregate score as midfielder Luca Zuffi curled in a 25-yard free-kick at the 15-minute mark. Saint-Étienne went close, but goalkeeper Tomáš Vaclík saved the shot from substitute Romain Hamouma. Both teams were later reduced to ten men: In the 82nd minute, Saint-Étienne midfielder Valentin Eysseric collected two quick yellow cards for a foul and then a clash with Renato Steffen, while Basel's 19-year-old attacker Breel Embolo followed him off the pitch, also for a second caution. Saint-Étienne thought they had won it when captain Moustapha Sall netted from close range with just one minute of regular time left to play, only for Luca Zuffi to crash the ball home in added time to level the tie at 4–4 and send Basel through on the away goals rule.

Sevilla (10 March 2016)

In the round of 16 Basel was drawn against Europa League cup holders Sevilla. The first leg was played in the St. Jakob-Park with an attendance of 22,403 fans. Sevilla had not won a European away game all season and Basel's home fixture against them was one of the more sober kinds of games. At seven minutes, Renato Steffen sent a good cross from the right and Marc Janko jumped high to head Basel's first chance from an unmarked position just a little bit too wide. Sevilla dominated possession thereafter. Steven Nzonzi went quite close with a header in the early minutes. Éver Banega twice found Coke with free kicks but the Sevilla captain was unable to find the target from either position. After the halftime break, Basel's resolve returned. The home team dominated for the first 15 minutes. Birkir Bjarnason blazed a shot off target from a loose ball after a Renato Steffen shot had been blocked. The Icelandic midfielder then crossed a good ball across the goal from the right, but substitute Adama Traoré miscued his attempted conversion. Then they started to lose their concentration as the game continued, but three good saves from Basel goalkeeper Tomáš Vaclík kept the home team in contention, he was very awake and saved with his feet after Nzonzi was played in from the right. Then he kept out Kevin Gameiro's low drive, going to the ground once more to repel Yevhen Konoplyanka as time ticked away. Basel got back into the game and started to dominate by moving forward quicker. Sevilla's midfielder Nzonzi's dismissal near the end of the game, after collecting two yellow cards within a few minutes of each other, offered Basel hope for victory, but Sevilla held firm.

Return match (17 March 2016)

The return game against Sevilla was played a week later on 17 March 2016 at the Ramón Sánchez Pizjuán Stadium with an attendance of 35,546 fans. The referee was Deniz Aytekin of the German Football Association and he reported a good pitch on the clear, but cool evening. Before the fixture, it was clear that FCB needed to perform exceptionally well, in order to qualify for the quarter-finals of the competition. It would have been the fourth time in the club's history that FCB would have reached this stage of the competition. Sevilla and Basel both started slowly into the game, they sparred with each other, but gently and very inconsequentially for the greater part of the first period. The Spaniards had the better of the half-chances. Then, on 35 minutes defender Adil Rami opened the scoring as he stooped himself at full length, to head a José Antonio Reyes corner, from the left, into the goal for the opener, the ball came off Tomáš Vaclík's left-hand post. Despite this, an away goal at that stage of the match would have put Basel in advantage and they nearly managed that goal, keeper David Soria pushed away Renato Steffen's glanced effort. However, things unraveled very quickly for head coach Urs Fischer's side and the match slipped out of Basel's reach within just two minutes at the end of the first half. Reyes danced through the Basel defense, drawing Vaclík and his defenders toward him before placing a ball through for Kevin Gameiro to nudge the ball into the unguarded goal from close range. The Frenchman had his second goal before Basel had time to digest the situation. Just one minute later Michael Krohn-Dehli advanced with a quick run and was the provider of the cross that found Gameiro. The striker's header came back off the underside of the crossbar, yet he instantly swung out a leg to force the rebound over the line, hitting the woodwork again on its way in, to make it 3–0 at half-time. Basel showed only small signs of a fightback. Luca Zuffi's effort from 25 yards out was still rising as it flew over the crossbar. Breel Embolo missed two chances late in the game as the Swiss side was dumped out of the competition. The result extended Sevilla's run of Europa League home wins to 11, the longest in the competition's history, and put a dent in Basel's impressive away record in Europe this season.

Conclusion

Beating Athletic Bilbao in the quarter-final and Shakhtar Donetsk in the semi-final, Sevilla advanced to the Europa League final. The final was played in the sold-out St. Jakob-Park in Basel with an attendance of 38,500 spectators on 18 May 2016 and Sevilla beat Liverpool 3–1, to win the competition. It was a dream for the club and the fans, as they made it three Europa League victories in succession.

Basel advanced to the round of 16 after winning their group and defeating Saint-Étienne in the round of 32. Following a 0-0 draw in the first leg, the club was eliminated by the defending champions Sevilla FC, after a 3-0 loss at the Ramón Sánchez Pizjuán Stadium. Although the competition's final was scheduled to be held at Basel's home stadium, St. Jakob-Park, the club's exit in the round of 16 concluded their European campaign for the season.

Basel's goal scorers in the competition were: Birkir Bjarnason in 10 games, Breel Embolo in 8 games, Mohamed Elneny in 5 games, Marc Janko in 9 games, and Luca Zuffi in 10 games, each with 2 goals, and Jean-Paul Boëtius in 4 games, Michael Lang in 10 games, Walter Samuel in 6 games and Marek Suchý in 9 games, each with one goal.

== Players ==
=== First team squad ===
The following is the list of the Basel first-team squad. It also includes players that were in the squad the day the season started on 18 July but subsequently left the club after that date.

As of 27 August 2015

Note: Flags indicate national team as defined under FIFA eligibility rules; some limited exceptions apply. Players may hold more than one non-FIFA nationality.

No.	Pos.	Nation	Player
1	GK	CZE	Tomáš Vaclík
3	DF	CIV	Adama Traoré
4	DF	SUI	Philipp Degen
5	DF	SUI	Michael Lang
6	DF	ARG	Walter Samuel
7	MF	SUI	Luca Zuffi
8	MF	ISL	Birkir Bjarnason
9	FW	SLO	Andraž Šporar
10	MF	ARG	Matías Delgado (Captain)
11	MF	ALB	Shkëlzen Gashi
14	FW	JPN	Yoichiro Kakitani
15	MF	SWE	Alexander Fransson
16	DF	SUI	Manuel Akanji
17	DF	CZE	Marek Suchý (vice-captain)
18	GK	SUI	Germano Vailati
19	DF	SWE	Behrang Safari

No.	Pos.	Nation	Player
21	FW	AUT	Marc Janko
22	MF	SRB	Zdravko Kuzmanović
23	GK	SUI	Mirko Salvi
24	MF	SUI	Renato Steffen
26	DF	DEN	Daniel Høegh
27	DF	ALB	Naser Aliji
28	MF	SUI	Robin Huser
30	MF	SUI	Cedric Itten
33	MF	EGY	Mohamed Elneny
34	MF	ALB	Taulant Xhaka
36	FW	SUI	Breel Embolo
38	FW	SUI	Albian Ajeti
39	MF	SUI	Davide Callà
40	GK	SUI	Dario Thürkauf
41	DF	SUI	Eray Cömert
42	DF	SUI	Charles Pickel
77	FW	NED	Jean-Paul Boëtius

=== Out on loan ===
19	MF	SUI	Musa Araz (on loan at Winterthur until 30 June 2016)
20	MF	SRB	Veljko Simić (on loan at Schaffhausen from 30 December 2015 until 30 June 2016)
22	MF	SRB	Zdravko Kuzmanović (on loan at Udinese until 30 June 2016)
23	GK	SUI	Mirko Salvi (on loan at Lugano from 7 January until 30 June 2016)
24	FW	EGY	Ahmed Hamoudi (on loan at Zamalek until 30 June 2016)
27	DF	ALB	Naser Aliji (on loan at Vaduz from 1 July until 10 September 2015)
35	FW	PRK	Pak Kwang-ryong (on loan at Biel-Bienne until 30 June 2016)

=== 2015 summer transfers ===
==== In ====
5	DF	SUI	Michael Lang (from Grasshopper Club Zürich Free Transfer)
8	MF	ISL	Birkir Bjarnason (from Pescara)
21	FW	AUT	Marc Janko (from Sydney FC Free Transfer)
22	MF	SRB	Zdravko Kuzmanović (from Internazionale)
26	DF	DEN	Daniel Høegh (from Odense BK)
77	FW	NED	Jean-Paul Boëtius (from Feyenoord)

==== Out ====
—	FW	PAR	Derlis González (to Dynamo Kyiv)
—	DF	SUI	Fabian Schär (to 1899 Hoffenheim)
—	MF	SUI	Fabian Frei (to Mainz 05)
—	GK	SUI	Pascal Albrecht (to St. Gallen II Free Transfer)
—	DF	ALB	Arlind Ajeti (to Unattached)
—	DF	ARG	Gastón Sauro (to Columbus Crew)
—	FW	IRL	Giovanni Sio (to Rennes)
—	FW	SUI	Marco Streller (end of career)

=== 2015–16 winter transfers ===
==== In ====
9	FW	SLO	Andraž Šporar (from Olimpija Ljubljana)
15	MF	SWE	Alexander Fransson (from IFK Norrköping)
24	MF	SUI	Renato Steffen (from Young Boys)

==== Out ====
11	FW	ALB	Shkelzen Gashi (to Colorado Rapids)
15	DF	BUL	Ivan Ivanov (contract beended mutual agreement)
38	FW	SUI	Albian Ajeti (to FC Augsburg)
14	FW	JPN	Yoichiro Kakitani (to Cerezo Osaka)
33	MF	EGY	Mohamed Elneny (to Arsenal)

== Results and fixtures ==
Kickoff times are in CET

=== Legend ===
Win Draw Loss Postponed

=== Friendly matches ===
==== Pre-season ====
27 June 2015 Pre-season	Basel	4–1	SC Austria Lustenau	Sportanlage Waldäcker, Herzogenbuchsee
14:30	Delgado 3' (1:0); Delgado 11' (2:0); Araz 37' (3:0); Traoré 69' (4:1)	FCB summary	40' (3:1) Wiessmeier	Attendance: 1,000; Referee: Michael Brunner
Note: 100 years jubilee FC Herzogenbuchsee

3 July 2015 Pre-season	Basel	1–2	1860 München	Isarau Stadium Geretsried (Germany)
20:00	Kakitani 5'	FCB summary	31' (o.g.) Vaclík; 34' Hain	Attendance: 1,800; Referee: Florian Kornblum (TSV Chieming)

9 July 2015 Pre-season	Basel	1–3	Shakhtar Donetsk	Stade du Christ-Roi, Lens (Switzerland)
19:00	Janko 5'	FCB summary	33', 70' Hladkyy; 85' Marlos	Attendance: 1,200; Referee: Stephan Klossner

11 July 2015 Pre-season	PSV	2–3	Basel	Stadion FC Solothurn, Solothurn (Switzerland)
17:00	Bergwijn 37'; Hendrix (yellow card) 78'; Narsingh 81'	FCB summary	23' (pen.) Gashi; 45+2' Embolo; 90+3' Callà	Attendance: 1,950; Referee: Adrien Jaccottet (Basel)

15 July 2015 Pre-season	Basel	2–1	Bayer Leverkusen	St. Jakob-Park, Basel
20:00	Embolo 23'; Al. Ajeti 52'; Kuzmanović (yellow card) 69'; Al. Ajeti (yellow card) 84'	FCB summary	(yellow card) 15' Bender; 21' Bellarabi; (yellow card) 69' Stafylidis	Attendance: 13,224; Referee: Stephan Klossner

==== Winter break ====
9 January 2016 Winter break	Basel	3–2	FC Biel	Youth Campus Basel, Münchenstein
14:30	Delgado 33' (1:0); Itten 50' (2:0); Itten 64' (3:1)	FCB summary	52' (2:1) Kololli; 55' (2:2) Kilezi	Attendance: 500; Referee: Adrien Jaccottet (Basel)

16 January 2016 Training camp	Basel	0–2	FC Augsburg	Marbella Football Center, San Pedro de Alcántara
16:00		FCB summary	6' (0:1) Hong; 78' (0:2) Morávek	Attendance: 150

21 January 2016 Training camp	Basel	1–1	SC Freiburg	Marbella Football Center, San Pedro de Alcántara
16:00	Höhn 44' (o.g. 1:0)	FCB summary	57' (1:1) Grifo	Attendance: 75; Referee: Juan Pedro Guarnido Peters

29 January 2016 Winter break	Austria Wien	3–1	Basel	Generali Arena, Vienna
18:00	Kayode 5' (1:0); Grünwald 45' (2:1); Gorgon 61' (3:1)	FCB summary	36' (1:1) Janko; (yellow card) 66' Xhaka	Attendance: 2,200; Referee: Vladimir Lukenic

2 February 2016 Winter break	Basel	4–2	Xamax	Youth Campus Basel, Münchenstein
16:00	Steffen 4' (1:1); Delgado 32' (pen. 2:1); Delgado 54' (3:2); Delgado 61' (4:2)	FCB summary	1' (0:1) Doudin; 34' (pen. 2:2) Doudin	Attendance: 500; Referee: Adrien Jaccottet (Basel)

=== Swiss Super League ===
==== First half of season ====
19 July 2015 Round 1	Basel	2–0	Vaduz	St. Jakob-Park, Basel
13:45	Delgado 10' (pen. 1:0); Elneny (yellow card) 74'; Kakitani 80' (2:0); Traoré (yellow card) 85'	FCB summary		Attendance: 27,066; Referee: (Switzerland) Sandro Schärer

25 July 2015 Round 2	Grasshopper Club	2–3	Basel	Letzigrund, Zürich
20:00	Dabour 30' (1:1); Caio 32' (2:1); Caio (yellow card) 90+1'	FCB summary	(yellow card) 17' Kuzmanović; 21' (0:1) Gashi; 38' (2:2) Janko; 68' (2:3) Lang; (yellow card) 80' Janko; (yellow card) 84' Xhaka; (yellow card) 88' Elneny	Attendance: 9.600; Referee: (Switzerland) Alain Bieri (Solothurn)

1 August 2015 Round 3	Basel	3–0	Sion	St. Jakob-Park, Basel
15:00	Delgado 27' (1:0); Xhaka (yellow card) 45+1'; Traoré 69' (2:0); Lacroix 89' (o.g. 3:1)	FCB summary Summary	(yellow card) 25' Follonier; (red card) 34' Salatić; (yellow card) 45+1' Jagne; (yellow card) 67' Zverotić; (yellow card) 90+3' Lacroix	Attendance: 27,792; Referee: (Switzerland) Sascha Amhof

8 August 2015 Round 4	Luzern	1–3	Basel	Swissporarena, Luzern
20:00	Lezcano 3' (1:0); Sarr (yellow card) 50'; Jantscher (yellow card) 78'	FCB summary	27' (1:1) Embolo; (yellow card) 29' Bjarnason; 33' (1:2) Embolo; (yellow card) 43' Safari; (yellow card) 53' Degen; (yellow card) 76' Callà; (yellow card) 78' Embolo; 90' (1:3) Delgado	Attendance: 14,748; Referee: (Switzerland) Sandro Schärer

12 August 2015 Round 5	Basel	3–1	Thun	St. Jakob-Park, Basel
19:45	Janko 4' (1:0); Lang (yellow card) 29'; Bjarnason (yellow card) 37'; Janko 49' (2:1); Janko (yellow card) 55'; Gashi 78' (pen. 3:1); Traoré (yellow card) 90'	FCB summary	29' (pen. 1:1) Frontino; (yellow card) 52' Reinmann; (red card) 78' Schindelholz; (yellow card) 84' Bürki	Attendance: 27,034; Referee: (Switzerland) Alain Bieri

22 August 2015 Round 6	Lugano	1–3	Basel	Cornaredo, Lugano
17:45	Piccinocchi 9' (1:0); Urbano (yellow card) 35'; Sabbatini (yellow card) 49'	FCB summary	11' (pen. 1:1) Callà; 42' (1:2) Elneny; 48' (1:3) Callà; (yellow card) 62' Boëtius; (yellow card) 75' P. Degen	Attendance: 6,500; Referee: (Switzerland) Sandro Schärer

30 August 2015 Round 7	Basel	3–1	Zürich	St. Jakob-Park, Basel
16:00	Lang 5' (1:0); Gashi 71' (2:1); Janko 85' (pen. 3:1)	FCB summary	38' (1:1) Kecojević; (yellow card) 41' Cabral; (yellow card) 53' Schneuwly; (yellow card) 84' Nef	Attendance: 30,579; Referee: (Switzerland) Nikolaj Hänni

12 September 2015 Round 8	Basel	2–1	St. Gallen	St. Jakob-Park, Basel
20:00	Delgado 2' (pen. 1:0); Suchý (yellow card) 42'; Janko 82' (2:0); Xhaka (yellow card) 90+3'	FCB summary	(yellow card) 18' Mutch; (yellow card) 40' Gelmi; 88' (2:1) Aratore	Attendance: 27,736; Referee: (Switzerland) Sascha Amhof

22 September 2015 Round 9	Young Boys	4–3	Basel	Stade de Suisse, Bern
20:30	Sulejmani 5' (1:0); Sulejmani 45' (2:1); Gerndt 65' (3:1); Gerndt 81' (4:2); Mvogo (yellow card) 86'; Lecjaks (yellow card) 15' (yellow-red card) 89'; Steffen (yellow card) 90'; Vilotić (yellow card) 90+1'	FCB summary	(yellow card) 17' Aliji; 23' (1:1) Embolo; (yellow card) 54' Kuzmanović; 74' (3:2) Suchý; (yellow card) 76' Xhaka; 90+1' (4:3) Janko; (red card) after finish' Xhaka	Attendance: 19,409; Referee: (Switzerland) Stephan Klossner

26 September 2015 Round 10	Basel	3–1	Lugano	St. Jakob-Park, Basel
20:00	Zuffi 39' (1:0); Zuffi 57' (2:0); Kuzmanović (yellow card) 81'; Bjarnason 84' (3:0)	FCB summary	90+4' (3:1) Čulina	Attendance: 26,083; Referee: (Switzerland) Sébastien Pache

3 October 2015 Round 11	Zürich	2–2	Basel	Letzigrund, Zürich
16:00	Gavranović 35' (1:0); Sadiku 90+3' (2:2)	FCB summary	(yellow card) 49' Lang; 52' (1:1) Janko; (yellow card) 81' Kuzmanović; 84' (1:2) Al. Ajeti; (yellow card) 90+4' Samuel	Attendance: 10,467; Referee: (Switzerland) Alain Bieri (Solothurn)

18 October 2015 Round 12	Sion	0–2	Basel	Stade Tourbillon, Sion
13:45	Kouassi (yellow card) 28'; Assifuah (yellow card) 90+1'	FCB summary Summary	5' (0:1) Janko; (yellow card) 56' Manuel Akanji; (yellow card) 67'Elneny; (yellow card) 79'Gashi; 89' (0:2) Janko; (yellow card) 90+1' Vaclík	Attendance: 10,700; Referee: (Switzerland) Sandro Schärer

25 October 2015 Round 13	Basel	1–0	Young Boys	St. Jakob-Park, Basel
16:00	Embolo (yellow card) 17'; Embolo 31' (1:0); Safari (yellow card) 59'; Janko (yellow card) 85'	FCB summary Summary	(yellow card) 30' Zakaria; (yellow card) 53' Vilotić; (yellow card) 26' (yellow-red card) 67' Wüthrich; (yellow card) 75' Bertone	Attendance: 33,360; Referee: (Switzerland) Alain Bieri

31 October 2015 Round 14	Vaduz	1–2	Basel	Rheinpark Stadion, Vaduz
20:00	Avdijaj 2' (1:0); Caballero (yellow card) 61'	FCB summary Summary	6' (1:1) Bjarnason; (yellow card) 20' Suchý; (yellow card) 67' Aliji; 80' (1:2) Janko; (yellow card) 84' Janko	Attendance: 4,897; Referee: (Switzerland) Lukas Fähndrich

8 November 2015 Round 15	Basel	2–3	Grasshopper	St. Jakob-Park, Basel
16:00	Boëtius (yellow card) 27'; Callà 62' (1:2); Embolo 74' (2:2)	FCB summary	(yellow card) 8' Källström; (yellow card) 15' Bauer; 19' (0:1) Källström; 25' (o.g. 0:2) Suchý; (yellow card) 52' Pnishi; (yellow card) 65' Barthe; 80' (2:3) Dabour; (yellow card) 90' Dabour	Attendance: 31,669; Referee: (Switzerland) Sascha Amhof

22 November 2015 Round 16	St. Gallen	2–1	Basel	AFG Arena, St. Gallen
13:45	Tafer 38' (1:1); Tafer 68' (2:1); Tréand (yellow card) 79'; Everton (yellow card) 88'	FCB summary	5' (0:1) Janko	Attendance: 15,740; Referee: (Austria) Harald Lechner

29 November 2015 Round 17	Basel	3–0	Luzern	St. Jakob-Park, Basel
13:45	Bjarnason 7' (1:0); Bjarnason (yellow card) 25'; Callà 26' (2:0); Elneny 32' (3:0); Elneny (yellow card) 84'; Zuffi (yellow card) 90+2'	FCB summary	(yellow card) 1' Lezcano; (yellow card) 30' Affolter; (yellow card) 58' Basha; (yellow card) 84' Lustenberger; (yellow card) 90' Freuler	Attendance: 29,691; Referee: (Switzerland) Stephan Klossner

6 December 2015 Round 18	Thun	0–2	Basel	Stockhorn Arena, Thun
16:00		FCB summary	(yellow card) 5' Samuel; (yellow card) 55' Xhaka; 67' (0:1) Janko; 70' (0:2) Janko	Attendance: 7,156; Referee: (Switzerland) Fedayi San

==== Second half of season ====
7 February 2016 Round 19	Basel	3–0	Luzern	St. Jakob-Park, Basel
16:00	Safari (yellow card) 43'; Bjarnason 50' (1:0); Delgado 72' (2:0); Steffen 85' (3:0); Steffen (yellow card) 90+1'	FCB summary	(yellow card) 67' Jantscher; (yellow card) 82' Lustenberger; (yellow card) 90+2' Rogulj	Attendance: 25,821; Referee: (Switzerland) Sandro Schärer

14 February 2016 Round 20	Grasshopper Club	0–4	Basel	Letzigrund, Zürich
16:00	Bašić (yellow card) 25'; Lüthi (yellow card) 34'	FCB summary	12' (0:1) Lang; 20' (0:2) Suchý; (red card) 31' Janko; 54' (0:3) Lang; (yellow card) 70' Delgado; 90+3' (0:4) Zuffi	Attendance: 9,500; Referee: (Switzerland) Alain Bieri (Solothurn)

21 February 2016 Round 21	Basel	5–1	Vaduz	St. Jakob-Park, Basel
13:45	Embolo (yellow card) 42'; Lang 51' (1:1); Fransson 57' (2:1); Zuffi 66' (3:1); Bjarnason 73' (4:1); Bjarnason 87' (5:1)	FCB summary	8' (0:1) Bühler; (yellow card) 36' Muntwiler; (yellow card) 65' Untersee	Attendance: 25,195; Referee: (Switzerland) Pascal Erlachner

28 February 2016 Round 22	Thun	1–1	Basel	Stockhorn Arena, Thun
13:45	Munsy 5' (1:0)	FCB summary	(yellow card) 21' Akanji; 44' (1:1) Steffen	Attendance: 6,807; Referee: (Switzerland) Alain Bieri (Solothurn)

6 March 2016 Round 23	Lugano	P–P	Basel	Cornaredo, Lugano
13:45		(Postponed)

13 March 2016 Round 24	Basel	4–2	St. Gallen	St. Jakob-Park, Basel
13:45	Janko 5' (1:0); Janko 49' (2:2); Janko 54' (3:2); Suchý (yellow card) 50'; Steffen (90+2 4:2)	FCB summary	12' (1:1) Salli; 22' (1:2) Angha; (yellow card) 33' Aratore	Attendance: 27,305; Referee: (Switzerland) Fedayi San

20 March 2016 Round 25	Sion	0–1	Basel	Stade Tourbillon, Sion
16:00	Zverotić (yellow card) 20'; Rüfli (yellow card) 83'	FCB summary	(yellow card) 35' Janko; 67' (pen. 0:1) Delgado	Attendance: 10,000; Referee: (Switzerland) Nikolaj Hänni

3 April 2016 Round 26	Basel	2–0	Young Boys	St. Jakob-Park, Basel
16:00	Embolo 46' (1:0); Janko (yellow card) 71'; Steffen (90+4 2:0)	FCB summary	(yellow card) 87' Florent Hadergjonaj	Attendance: 31,642; Referee: (Switzerland) Stephan Klossner

10 April 2016 Round 27	Basel	2–2	Zürich	St. Jakob-Park, Basel
13:45	Suchý (yellow card) 14'; Embolo (yellow card) 65'; Safari (red card) 76'; Delgado 83' (pen. 1:2); Bjarnason 85' (2:2)	FCB summary	(yellow card) 60' Buff; 61' (0:1) Kerzhakov; 70' (0:2) Bua; (yellow card) 73' Brunner; (yellow card) 82' Nef; (yellow card) 90+3' Koch	Attendance: 31,257; Referee: (Switzerland) Fedayi San (Gebenstorf)

13 April 2016 Round 23	Lugano	1–4	Basel	Cornaredo, Lugano
18:30	Veseli (yellow card) 22'; Rey (yellow card) 40'; Čulina 47' (1:4); Urbano (yellow card) 54'	FCB summary	10' (0:1) Bjarnason; 13' (0:2) Samuel; 22' (pen. 0:3) Delgado; 44' (0:4) Itten	Attendance: 3,085; Referee: (Switzerland) Lukas Fähndrich

17 April 2016 Round 28	St. Gallen	0–7	Basel	AFG Arena, St. Gallen
16:00	Gaudino (yellow card) 49'	FCB summary	29' (0:1) Steffen; 47' (o.g. 0:2) Angha; (yellow card) 56' Steffen; 62' (o.g. 0:3) Gaudino; 64' (0:4) Callà; 67' (0:5) Steffen; 72' (0:6) Embolo; (yellow card) 76'Itten; 78' (0:7) Steffen	Attendance: 14,876; Referee: (Switzerland) Pascal Erlachner

20 April 2016 Round 29	Basel	3–0	Lugano	St. Jakob-Park, Basel
19:45	Suchý (yellow card) 38'; Embolo 44' (1:0); Embolo 56' (2:0); Boëtius (90+1 3:0)	FCB summary	(yellow card) 52' Datković; (yellow card) 73' Veseli	Attendance: 24,938; Referee: (Switzerland) Sandro Schärer

24 April 2016 Round 30	Vaduz	0–0	Basel	Rheinpark Stadion, Vaduz
16:00		FCB summary	(yellow card) 22' Itten; (yellow card) 62' Suchý	Attendance: 5,543; Referee: (Switzerland) Stephan Klossner

30 April 2016 Round 31	Basel	2–1	Sion	St. Jakob-Park, Basel
20:00	Delgado 24' (pen. 1:0); Steffen (yellow card) 30'; Bjarnason 67' (2:0); Embolo (yellow card) 85'	FCB summary	(yellow card) 11' Salatić; (yellow card) 87' Carlitos; 90+2' (2:1) Salatić	Attendance: 32,244; Referee: (Switzerland) Alain Bieri (Solothurn)

7 May 2016 Round 32	Zürich	2–3	Basel	Letzigrund, Zürich
20:00	Koch 16' (1:1); Buff 60' (2:2); Vinícius (yellow card) 69'; Nef (yellow card) 76'	FCB summary	10' (0:1) Delgado; 55' (1:2) Callà; (yellow card) 58' Aliji; 88' (pen. 2:3) Embolo	Attendance: 9.636; Referee: (Switzerland) Nikolaj Hänni (Gams SG)
Note: Super League debut for Eray Cümart

10 May 2016 Round 33	Basel	1–1	Thun	St. Jakob-Park, Basel
19:45	Bjarnason 81' (1:1); Suchý (yellow card) 84'	FCB summary	43' (0:1) Schirinzi; (yellow card) 46' Wieser; (yellow card) 86' Joss	Attendance: 24,558; Referee: (Switzerland) Sébastien Pache

16 May 2016 Round 34	Luzern	4–0	Basel	Swissporarena, Luzern
16:00	Schneuwly 7' (1:0); Jantscher 10' (2:0); Hyka 48' (3:0); Affolter (yellow card) 56'; Haas 60' (4:0)	FCB summary	(yellow card) 79' Steffen; (yellow card) 85' Aliji	Attendance: 16,500; Referee: (Switzerland) Sandro Schärer

21 May 2016 Round 35	Young Boys	2–3	Basel	Stade de Suisse, Bern
16:00	Lecjaks (yellow card) 25'; Von Bergen (yellow card) 58'; Nuzzolo 80'; Hadergjonaj (yellow card) 86'; Hoarau 90+1'	FCB summary	10' (0:1) Delgado; (yellow card) 16' Delgado; 31' (0:2) Boëtius; 44' (0:3) Boëtius; (yellow card) 45' Callà	Attendance: 21,721; Referee: (Switzerland) Fedayi San (Gebenstorf)

25 May 2016 Round 36	Basel	0–1	Grasshopper	St. Jakob-Park, Basel
20:30	Boëtius (yellow card) 77'	FCB summary	41' (o.g. 0:1) Traoré; (yellow card) 51' Bašić; (yellow card) 52' Dabour; (yellow card) 52' Källström; (yellow card) 80' Kamberi	Attendance: 30,682; Referee: (Switzerland) Stephan Klossner

==== League table ====
Pos	Team	Pld	W	D	L	GF	GA	GD	Pts	Qualification or relegation
1	Basel (C)	36	26	5	5	88	38	+50	83	Qualification for the Champions League group stage
2	Young Boys	36	20	9	7	78	47	+31	69	Qualification for the Champions League third qualifying round
3	Luzern	36	15	9	12	59	50	+9	54	Qualification for the Europa League third qualifying round
4	Grasshopper	36	15	8	13	65	56	+9	53	Qualification for the Europa League second qualifying round
5	Sion	36	14	8	14	52	49	+3	50	
6	Thun	36	10	11	15	45	54	−9	41	
7	St. Gallen	36	10	8	18	41	66	−25	38	
8	Vaduz	36	7	15	14	44	60	−16	36	Qualification for the Europa League first qualifying round (Note: Vaduz qualified for the UEFA Europa League first qualifying round by winning the 2015–16 Liechtenstein Cup.)
9	Lugano	36	9	8	19	46	75	−29	35	
10	Zürich (R)	36	7	13	16	48	71	−23	34	Qualification for the Europa League group stage (Note: Zürich qualified for the UEFA Europa League group stage by winning the 2015–16 Swiss Cup.) Relegation to the Swiss Challenge League

Source: Swiss Super League, Soccerway
Rules for classification: 1) Points; 2) Goal difference; 3) Goals scored; 4) Head-to-head points 5) Draw.
(C) Champions; (R) Relegated

=== Swiss Cup ===
15 August 2015 Round 1	Meyrin (GE)	0–4	Basel	Stade des Arberes, Meyrin
18:00 CET	Matteo Rezzonico (yellow card) 56'; Fitim Rugovaj (yellow card) 75'	FCB summary ASF/SFV summary Soccerway summary	34' (0:1) Al. Ajeti; 58' (0:2) Elneny; 59' (0:3) Al. Ajeti; 60' (0:4) Delgado	Attendance: 2,100; Referee: (Switzerland) Lukas Fähndrich

20 September 2015 Round 2	YF Juventus	1–4	Basel	St. Jakob-Park, Basel
14:00	Da Silva Chagdas (yellow card) 45'; Nicolas Huber (yellow card) 52'; Da Silva Chagdas 85' (pen. 1:4)	FCB summary ASF/SFV summary	15' (0:1) Callà; 30' (0:2) Delgado; 50' (0:3) Delgado; (yellow card) 85' Samuel; 80' (0:4) Callà	Attendance: 4,606; Referee: (Switzerland) Alain Bieri (Solothurn)

28 October 2015 Round 3	SV Muttenz	1–5	Basel	Sportplatz Margelacker, Muttenz
19:30	Manuel Jenny 48' (pen. 1:2); Manuel Jenny (yellow card) 64'	FCB summary FCB report ASF/SFV summary	25' (0:1) Høegh; 35' (0:2) Gashi; (yellow card) 46' Høegh; 62' (1:3) Gashi; (yellow card) 64' Gashi; 72' (1:4) Gashi; 75' (pen. 1:5) Al. Ajeti	Attendance: 5,800 (stadium record); Referee: (Switzerland) Sascha Amhof

13 December 2015 Quarterfinal	Sion	2–2 (a.e.t.) (4–3 p)	FC Basel	Stade de Tourbillon, Sion
15:30	Pa Modou 37'; Salatić (yellow card) 55'; Assifuah 66'; Kouassi (yellow card) 69'; Adão (yellow card) 84'; Lacroix (yellow card) 113'; Fernandes (yellow card) 116'	FCB summary ASF/SFV summary	(yellow card) 32' Delgado; (yellow card) 50' Lang; (yellow card) 54' Samuel; (yellow card) 78' Bjarnason; 79' Elneny; 89' (pen.) Janko; (yellow card) 90+1' Elneny; (yellow card) 96' Safari; (yellow card) 120' Janko	Attendance: 9,200; Referee: (Switzerland) Stephan Klossner
	Penalties
	Bia (penalty scored); Ziegler (penalty missed); Salatić (penalty scored); Carlitos (penalty scored); Pa Modou (penalty scored)		(penalty scored) Elneny; (penalty scored) Janko; (penalty missed) Bjarnason; (penalty missed) Samuel; (penalty scored) Callà

=== UEFA Champions League ===
==== Third qualifying round ====
The draw for the third qualifying round was held on 17 July 2015. The first leg was played on 29 July, and the second leg on 5 August 2015.

29 July 2015 First leg	Lech Poznań (Poland)	1–3	(Switzerland) Basel	INEA Stadion, Poznań
20:45	Thomalla 36'; Thomalla (yellow card) 49'; Kędziora (red card) 66'; Linetty (yellow card) 69'; Kádár (yellow card) 82'	FCB summary UEFA summary	34' Lang; 77' Janko; 90+2' Callà; (red card) 90+3' T. Xhaka	Attendance: 28,000; Referee: Anthony Taylor (England)

5 August 2015 Second leg	Basel (Switzerland)	1–0 (4–1 agg.)	(Poland) Lech Poznań	St. Jakob-Park, Basel
20:15	Suchý (yellow card) 44'; Lang (yellow card) 55'; Callà (yellow card) 80'; Bjarnason 90+1'	FCB summary UEFA summary	(yellow card) 44' Linetty; (yellow card) 56' Kamiński; (yellow card) 86' Douglas	Attendance: 18,196; Referee: (France) Ruddy Buquet

Basel won 4–1 on aggregate.

==== Play-off round ====
The draw was held on 7 August 2015.

19 August 2015 First leg	Basel (Switzerland)	2–2	(Israel) Maccabi Tel Aviv	St. Jakob-Park, Basel
20:45 CET	Elneny (yellow card) 19'; Delgado 39' (pen.); Suchý (yellow card) 60'; Embolo 88' (2:1)	FCB summary UEFA summary	31' (0:1) Zahavi; (yellow card) 70' Igiebor; (yellow card) 77' Alberman; 90+6' (2:2) Zahavi	Attendance: 15,620; Referee: Willie Collum (Scotland)

25 August 2015 Second leg	Maccabi Tel Aviv (Israel)	1–1 (a 3 – 3 agg.)	(Switzerland) Basel	Bloomfield Stadium, Tel Aviv
20:45 CET	Zahavi 24'; Rikan (yellow card) 62'	FCB summary UEFA summary	11' Zuffi; (yellow card) 49' Safari; (yellow card) 74' Zuffi; (yellow card) 84' T. Xhaka; (yellow card) 85' Suchý	Attendance: 13,350; Referee: Damir Skomina (Slovenia)

Maccabi Tel Aviv won on away goals rule.

=== UEFA Europa League ===
==== Group stage ====
The draw was held on 28 August 2015, at the Grimaldi Forum in Monaco and Basel was drawn into Group I.

Pos	Team	Pld	W	D	L	GF	GA	GD	Pts	Qualification	BSL	FIO	LCH	BEL
1	(Switzerland) Basel	6	4	1	1	10	5	+5	13	Advance to knockout phase	—	2–2	2–0	1–2
2	(Italy) Fiorentina	6	3	1	2	11	6	+5	10	Advance to knockout phase	1–2	—	1–2	1–0
3	(Poland) Lech Poznań	6	1	2	3	2	6	−4	5		0–1	0–2	—	0–0
4	(Portugal) Belenenses	6	1	2	3	2	8	−6	5		0–2	0–4	0–0	—

Source: Soccerway
Rules for classification: Group stage tiebreakers

17 September 2015 Round 1	Fiorentina (Italy)	1–2	(Switzerland) Basel	Stadio Artemio Franchi, Florence
21:05	Kalinić 4' (1:0); Roncaglia (yellow card) 35'; Rodríguez (red card) 65'	FCB summary UEFA summary	(yellow card) 34' Xhaka; (yellow card) 56' Suchý; 71' (1:1) Bjarnason; 79' (1:2) Elneny; (yellow card) 83' Janko	Attendance: 15,212; Referee: (England) Michael Oliver

1 October 2015 Round 2	Basel (Switzerland)	2–0	(Poland) Lech Poznań	St. Jakob-Park, Basel
19:00	Samuel (yellow card) 41'; Bjarnason 55' (1:0); Embolo 90' (2:0)	FCB summary UEFA summary	(yellow card) 42' (red card) 59' Linetty	Attendance: 17,567; Referee: (Bosnia and Herzegovina) Ognjen Valjić

22 October 2015 Round 3	Basel (Switzerland)	1–2	(Portugal) Belenenses	St. Jakob-Park, Basel
19:00	Lang 15' (1:0); Suchý (yellow card) 73'	FCB summary UEFA summary	27' (1:1) Leal; (yellow card) 34' Ferreira; 45+1' (1:2) Kuca; (yellow card) 87' Leal	Attendance: 17,275; Referee: Simon Lee Evans (Wales)

5 November 2015 Round 4	Belenenses (Portugal)	0–2	(Switzerland) Basel	Estádio do Restelo, Lisbon
21:05	Silva (yellow card) 65'; Pinto (yellow card) 66'; Caeiro (yellow card) 70'	FCB summary UEFA summary	45+1' (pen. 0:1) Janko; (yellow card) 60' Elneny; 64' (0:2) Embolo; (yellow card) 66' Janko; (yellow card) 89' Lang	Attendance: 4,802; Referee: Tamás Bognár (Hungary)

26 November 2015 Round 5	Basel (Switzerland)	2–2	(Italy) Fiorentina	St. Jakob-Park, Basel
19:00	Safari (yellow card) 26'; Bjarnason (yellow card) 29'; Suchý 40' (1:2); Janko (yellow card) 45+1'; Suchý (yellow card) 65'; Elneny 74' (2:2); Zuffi (yellow card) 78'	FCB summary UEFA summary	23' (0:1) Bernardeschi; 36' (0:2) Bernardeschi; (red card) 26' Roncaglia; (yellow card) 45+1' Rodríguez; (yellow card) 45+3' Badelj; (yellow card) 75' Valero	Attendance: 22,550; Referee: (Slovenia) Ivan Kružliak (Slovakia)

10 December 2015 Round 6	Lech Poznań (Poland)	0–1	(Switzerland) Basel	INEA Stadion, Poznań
21:05		FCB summary UEFA summary	50' (0:1) Boëtius	Attendance: 10,457; Referee: Bobby Madden (Scotland)
Note: Fair game, no yellow cards

==== Round of 32 ====
The draw for the round of 32 was held on 14 December 2015. The first leg was played on 18 February, and the second on 25 February 2016.

18 February 2016 First Leg	Saint-Étienne (France)	3–2	(Switzerland) Basel	Saint-Étienne, France
19:00	Sall 9' (1:0); Monnet-Paquet 39' (2:0); Tannane (yellow card) 60'; Pajot (yellow card) 72'; Bahebeck 77' (3:2)	FCB summary UEFA summary	(yellow card) 25' Steffen; 44' (2:1) Samuel; 56' (pen. 2:2) Janko; (yellow card) 60' Xhaka; (yellow card) 74' Samuel; (yellow card) 88' Janko	Stadium: Stade Geoffroy-Guichard; Attendance: 27,013; Referee: Tasos Sidiropoulos (Greece)

25 February 2016 Second leg	Basel (Switzerland)	2–1	(France) Saint-Étienne	St. Jakob-Park, Basel
21:05	Zuffi 15' (1:0); Embolo (yellow card) 55' (yellow-red card) 84'; Zuffi 90+2' (2:1)	FCB summary UEFA summary	(yellow card) 31' Tannane; (yellow card) 63' Pogba; (yellow card) 82' (yellow-red card) 82' Eysseric; 90' Sall	Attendance: 20,976; Referee: Danny Makkelie (Netherlands)

4–4 on aggregate. Basel won on away goals.

==== Round of 16 ====
The draw was held on 26 February 2016. The first leg was played on 10 March, and the second leg played on 17 March 2016.

10 March 2016 Round	Basel (Switzerland)	0–0	(Spain) Sevilla	St. Jakob-Park, Basel
19:00	Samuel (yellow card) 8'; Steffen (yellow card) 90'	FCB summary UEFA summary	(yellow card) 37' Banega; (yellow card) 41' Cristóforo; (yellow card) 85' Trémoulinas; (yellow card) 75' (yellow-red card) 87' Nzonzi	Attendance: 22,403; Referee: Anthony Taylor (England)

17 March 2016	Sevilla (Spain)	3–0	(Switzerland) Basel	Ramón Sánchez Pizjuán, Seville
21:05	Kolodziejczak (yellow card) 7'; Rami 35' (1:0); Gameiro 44' (2:0); Gameiro 45' (3:0)	FCB summary UEFA summary	(yellow card) 39' Steffen; (yellow card) 90+4' Embolo	Attendance: 35,546; Referee: Deniz Aytekin (Germany)

Sevilla won 3–0 on aggregate.

== See also ==
- History of FC Basel
- List of FC Basel players
- List of FC Basel seasons

== Sources ==
- Rotblau: Jahrbuch Saison 2015/2016. Publisher: FC Basel Marketing AG. ISBN 978-3-7245-2050-4
- Rotblau: Jahrbuch Saison 2017/2018. Publisher: FC Basel Marketing AG. ISBN 978-3-7245-2189-1
- Die ersten 125 Jahre / 2018. Publisher: Josef Zindel im Friedrich Reinhardt Verlag, Basel. ISBN 978-3-7245-2305-5
- Season 2015–16 at "Basler Fussballarchiv" homepage
- Switzerland 2015–16 at RSSSF
