= Jean-Paul Boëtius =

Surinamese footballer (born 1994)

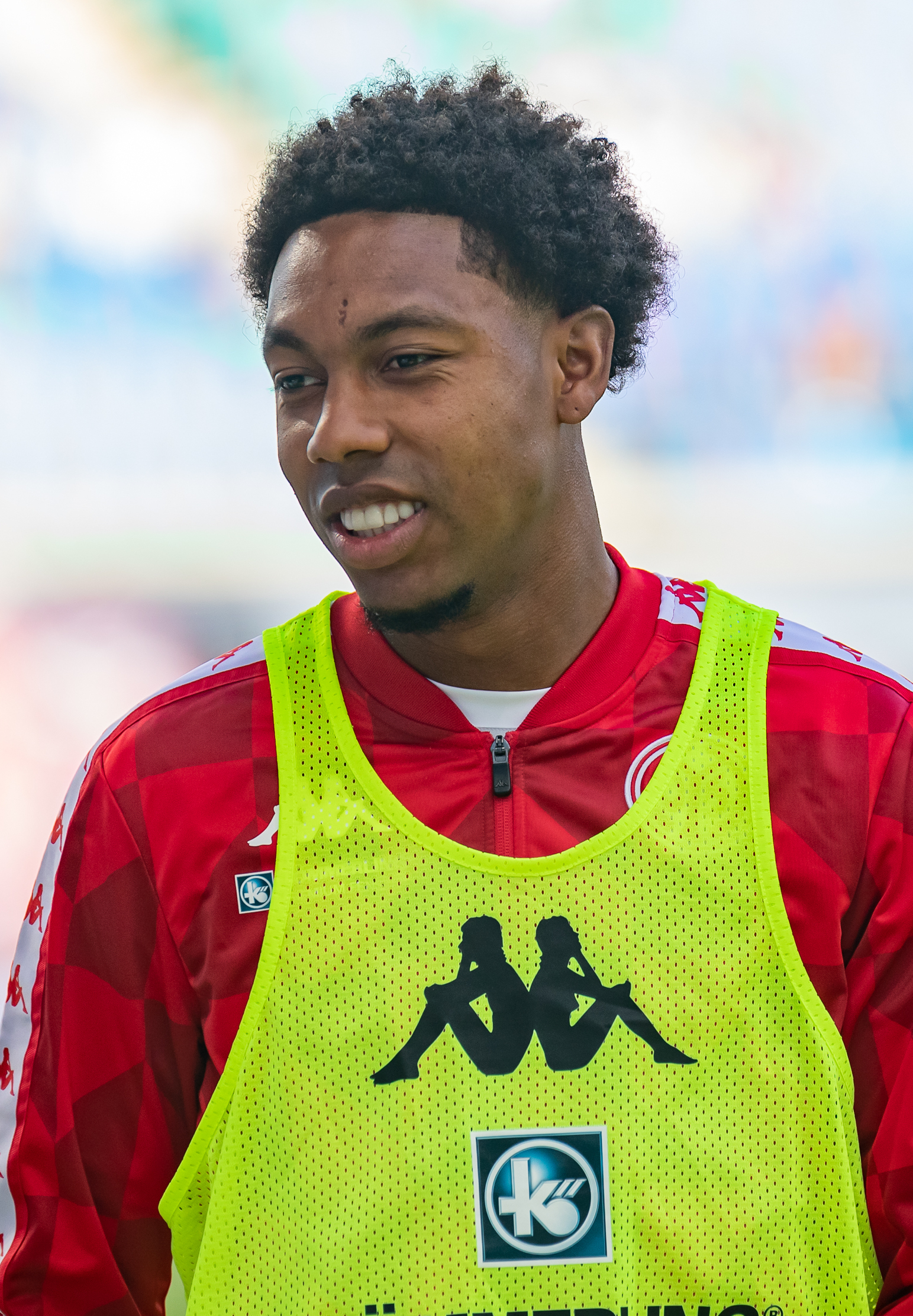
- Boëtius with Mainz in 2020

Personal information
- Full name: Jean-Paul Patrick Boëtius
- Date of birth: 22 March 1994 (age 32)
- Place of birth: Rotterdam, Netherlands
- Height: 1.78 m (5 ft 10 in)
- Positions: Winger; attacking midfielder

Youth career
- 2000: HOV/DJSCR
- 2000–2012: Feyenoord

Senior career*
Years	Team	Apps	(Gls)
2012–2015	Feyenoord	82	(18)
2015–2017	Basel	14	(3)
2017	→ Genk (loan)	15	(3)
2017–2018	Feyenoord	29	(6)
2018–2022	Mainz 05	122	(12)
2022–2023	Hertha BSC	21	(0)
2025–2026	Darmstadt 98	16	(0)
2026	RKC Waalwijk	6	(0)

International career^{‡}
2010–2011	Netherlands U17	10	(1)
2012	Netherlands U19	4	(1)
2013–2016	Netherlands U21	18	(3)
2014	Netherlands	1	(0)
2025–	Suriname	9	(0)
- * Club domestic league appearances and goals as of 24 April 2026 ‡ National team caps and goals as of 26 March 2026

Jean-Paul Patrick Boëtius (born 22 March 1994) is a professional footballer who plays as an attacking midfielder and a winger. A one-time international for the Netherlands national team, he plays for the Suriname national team.

He made his debut for hometown club Feyenoord in 2012 at the age of 18 and remained at the club for three years before moving to Swiss club FC Basel. At Basel, he failed to establish himself. Following a loan to Belgian side Genk in the second half of the 2016–17 season, he returned to Feyenoord.

== Club career ==
=== Feyenoord ===
Boëtius made his debut for Feyenoord at the age of 18, when then-manager Ronald Koeman named him in the starting line-up in De Klassieker, the main football rivalry in The Netherlands, at home against long-time rivals Ajax on 28 October 2012. Having never made the bench before, Boëtius was a shock addition in the starting line-up and ended up scoring the equaliser in a game that ended in a 2–2 draw to cap off a positive debut performance. He quickly became a starter for the Rotterdam-based club as a left winger. In his first season in the Eredivisie, Boëtius played in 20 league games, scoring 4 goals and delivering 2 assists. Feyenoord finished the 2012–13 season on 3rd position and secured a spot in the Europa League play-offs for the next season. However, Boëtius' season was ended prematurely after suffering a knee injury during a training session in April.

Because of the knee injury, Boëtius missed the beginning of the 2013–14 season. He made his season debut on 15 September 2013 coming off the bench in the 62nd minute against NEC Nijmegen. Just five minutes after entering the pitch Boëtius scored a goal giving his team a 2–1 lead. During the season Boëtius scored 10 goals in 29 appearances. He finished 3rd among the league's assists leaders with a total of 9 assists. Feyenoord ended the season on the second place only behind Ajax, earning a spot in the UEFA Champions League third qualifying round.

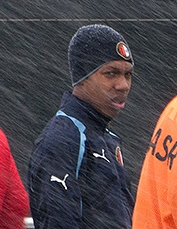
Boëtius with Feyenoord in 2013

=== Basel ===
On 2 August 2015, it was announced that Boëtius was signed by Swiss side Basel. On the next day Basel confirmed the transfer, stating that Boëtius had signed a four-year contract with them. Boëtius joined Basel's first team for their 2015–16 season under head coach Urs Fischer. Boëtius made his first team debut for Basel in the 2015–16 UEFA Champions League play-off round on 19 August in the match against Maccabi Tel Aviv which ended in a 2–2 draw. Boëtius played his domestic league debut for his new club in the away game in the Cornaredo on 22 August as Basel won 3–1 against FC Lugano. He scored his first goal for the team in the Europa League group stage away game on 10 December 2015 and it was the only goal of the match as Basel won 1–0 against Lech Poznań. He scored his first league goal for the club on 20 April 2016 in the home game in the St. Jakob-Park as Basel won 3–0 against FC Lugano. However, during the season Boëtius was used mainly as a substitute by trainer Fischer Boëtius as the club won the Swiss Super League championship at the end of the season. For the club it was the seventh title in a row and their 19th championship title in total.

In the following season Boëtius could not reach the status of becoming a regular player either and so during the winter break the club looked for another solution. On 31 January 2017, FC Basel announced that they loaned Boëtius to KRC Genk until the end of the season and that KRC had the option for a permanent takeover. Genk did not pull the option. However, Boëtius did not return to Basel and he moved on. During his short time with the club, Boëtius played a total of 36 games for Basel scoring a total of 7 goals. 14 of these games were in the Swiss Super League, three in the Swiss Cup, six in the UEFA competitions (Champions League and Europa League) and 13 were friendly games. He scored three goals in the domestic league, three in the Swiss Cup the other were scored in the Europa League.

=== Feyenoord ===
On 23 June 2017, Feyenoord announced that Boëtius would return to the club on a three-year contract. On 22 April 2018, he played as Feyenoord won the 2017–18 KNVB Cup final 3–0 against AZ Alkmaar.

At the start of the 2018–19 season, Boëtius received a disciplinary suspension for refusing a training mandatory for players who did not start the match against Fenerbahce. During the first league match of the season, the attacker was sent off after receiving his second yellow card, for a sarcastic applause towards the referee after receiving his first yellow card. After that, Feyenoord manager Giovanni van Bronckhorst told him it was going to be a difficult situation for him, and he was allowed to leave the club.

=== Mainz 05 ===
In August 2018, Boëtius joined Bundesliga side 1. FSV Mainz 05 on a four-year contract. The transfer fee paid to Feyenoord was reported as €3.5 million. On 27 October 2018, Boëtius scored his first goal in the Bundesliga in a 1–2 loss to Bayern Munich. On 18 May 2019, Boëtius scored two goals for Mainz in a 4–2 victory over Hoffenheim.

On 20 June 2020, Boëtius scored Mainz's second goal in a 3–1 victory over Werder Bremen in the penultimate match of the Bundesliga season. The win secured the club's place in the Bundesliga for the following campaign.

=== Hertha BSC ===
On 8 August 2022, Boëtius joined Bundesliga side Hertha BSC on a free transfer, signing a three-year contract and joining his former coach with Mainz, Sandro Schwarz. Boëtius appeared in 21 league matches with Hertha in his lone season at the club, exercising his release clause at the end of the campaign, as Hertha was relegated to the second division.

=== Darmstadt ===
After a year and a half of cancer treatments, on 21 January 2025 Boëtius signed a contract with SV Darmstadt in 2. Bundesliga. On 2 February 2026, his contract with Darmstadt was mutually terminated.

== International career ==
On 6 March 2013, Boëtius was called up for the preliminary squad of the Dutch national team for the first time, aged only 18. He made his debut for the Netherlands national team on 5 March 2014 in an exhibition match against France at Stade de France in Saint-Denis. He started the match as a left winger but was substituted in the 72nd minute as the Netherlands were defeated 0–2.

Boëtius was called up to the Dutch preliminary squad for the FIFA World Cup 2014 in Brazil. However, he was omitted in coach Louis van Gaal's final selection.

On 9 June 2025, Boëtius' request to switch international allegiance to Suriname was approved by FIFA. He debuted for the Suriname national team in a 1–1 2026 FIFA World Cup qualification tie with El Salvador national team on 10 June 2025.

== Personal life ==
Born in the Netherlands, Boëtius is of Surinamese descent. Boëtius is a cousin of Urby Emanuelson, another professional football player, who played for Ajax and for FC Utrecht.

In September 2022 he was diagnosed with testicular cancer.

== Career statistics ==
=== Club ===
As of last match played 8 August 2022

Appearances and goals by club, season and competition
Club	Season	League			Cup		Continental		Other		Total	
Club	Season	Division	Apps	Goals	Apps	Goals	Apps	Goals	Apps	Goals	Apps	Goals
Feyenoord	2012–13	Eredivisie	20	4	2	0	0	0	—		22	4
Feyenoord	2013–14	Eredivisie	29	10	3	1	0	0	—		32	11
Feyenoord	2014–15	Eredivisie	33	4	1	0	8	1	0	0	42	5
Feyenoord	Total		82	18	6	1	8	1	0	0	96	20
Basel	2015–16	Swiss Super League	12	3	0	0	6	1	—		18	4
Basel	2016–17	Swiss Super League	2	0	3	3	0	0	—		5	3
Basel	Total		14	3	3	3	6	1	—		23	7
Genk	2016–17	Belgian First Division A	15	3	0	0	6	1	2	1	23	5
Feyenoord	2017–18	Eredivisie	28	6	4	0	6	0	0	0	38	6
Feyenoord	2018–19	Eredivisie	1	0	0	0	1	0	0	0	2	0
Feyenoord	Total		29	6	4	0	7	0	0	0	40	6
Mainz 05	2018–19	Bundesliga	30	4	1	0	—		—		31	4
Mainz 05	2019–20	Bundesliga	28	4	1	0	—		—		29	4
Mainz 05	2020–21	Bundesliga	31	2	2	1	—		—		33	3
Mainz 05	2021–22	Bundesliga	33	2	3	0	—		—		36	2
Mainz 05	Total		122	12	7	1	—		—		129	13
Hertha BSC	2022–23	Bundesliga	21	0	0	0	—		—		21	0
Career total			283	42	20	5	27	3	2	1	332	51

=== International ===
As of 26 March 2026

Appearances and goals by national team and year
National team	Year	Apps	Goals
Netherlands
Netherlands	2014	1	0
Netherlands	Total	1	0
Suriname
Suriname	2025	8	0
Suriname	2026	1	0
Suriname	Total	9	0
Career total		10	0

== Honours ==
Basel

- Swiss Super League: 2015–16

Feyenoord

- KNVB Cup: 2017–18
- Johan Cruijff Shield: 2017, 2018

Netherlands U17

- UEFA European Under-17 Championship: 2011
