= Breel Embolo =

Footballer (born 1997)

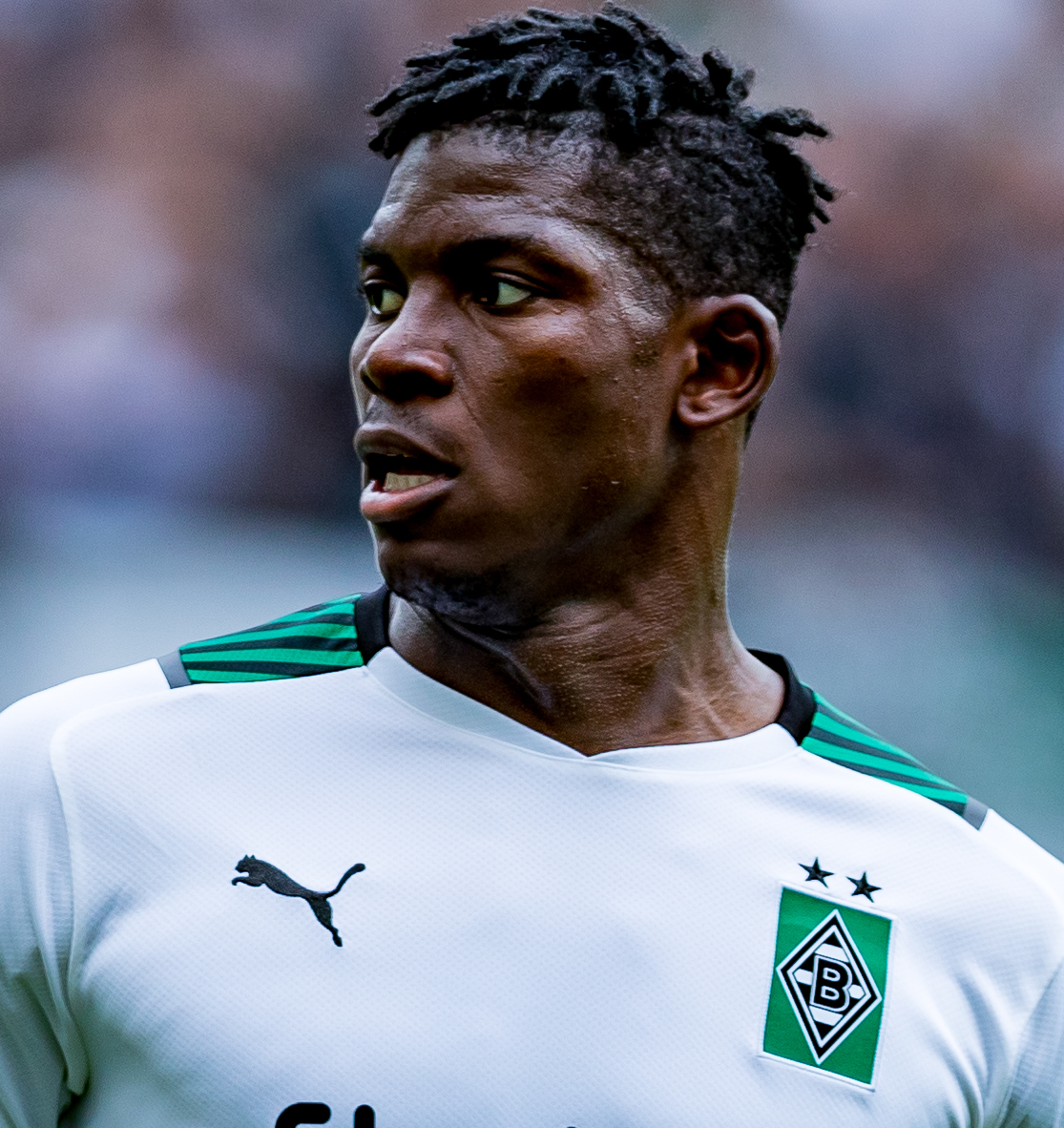
- Embolo playing for Borussia Mönchengladbach in 2022

Personal information
- Full name: Breel Donald Embolo
- Date of birth: 14 February 1997 (age 29)
- Place of birth: Yaoundé, Cameroon
- Height: 1.87 m (6 ft 2 in)
- Position: Forward

Team information
- Current team: Atlanta United
- Number: 36

Youth career
- 2006–2008: Nordstern
- 2008–2010: Old Boys
- 2010–2014: Basel

Senior career*
Years	Team	Apps	(Gls)
2014–2016	Basel	61	(21)
2016–2019	Schalke 04	48	(10)
2019–2022	Borussia Mönchengladbach	88	(22)
2022–2025	Monaco	66	(19)
2025–2026	Rennes	31	(8)
2026–	Atlanta United	12	(4)

International career^{‡}
2012	Switzerland U16	4	(1)
2014–2015	Switzerland U20	5	(0)
2014–2015	Switzerland U21	2	(0)
2015–	Switzerland	94	(26)
- * Club domestic league appearances and goals as of 11 November 2026 ‡ National team caps and goals as of 16 November 2026

Breel Donald Embolo (born 14 February 1997) is a professional footballer who plays as a forward for Major League Soccer club Atlanta United and the Switzerland national team.

Born in Cameroon, Embolo moved with his mother and siblings to France before finally settling in Switzerland. After working his way through their junior teams, Embolo made his professional debut for Basel in March 2014, and won the Swiss Super League in all three of his first seasons before moving to Germany after being signed by Schalke 04 for a reported fee of €20 million. Shortly after moving to the Bundesliga, he suffered an ankle injury that ruled him out for nearly a year. He later played for Borussia Mönchengladbach before moving to Ligue 1 to play for Monaco.

Embolo made his senior international debut in 2015, earning over 90 caps. He represented Switzerland at the UEFA European Championship in 2016, 2020, and 2024, and at the FIFA World Cup in 2018, 2022 and 2026.

== Early life ==
Breel Donald Embolo was born on 14 February 1997, in the Cameroonian capital of Yaoundé. His parents separated when he was young, and, at the age of five, his mother moved to France where he attended school; he was raised along with his siblings between Toulouse and Paris. The following year, the family moved to Basel, Switzerland.

== Club career ==
=== Early career ===
Embolo started his youth football with Nordstern. At the age of ten, Embolo failed his first trial with Basel, so he moved to the Old Boys. He was finally allowed to join the FCB youth system in their U-13 team. In the 2011–12 and 2012–13 seasons he played in Basel's U-16. With the U-16 team he won the Swiss Championship title twice at this level. He received various individual prizes, such as the Basel youngster of the year 2013. On 8 March 2013, just three weeks after his 16th birthday, he signed his first professional contract with the club. In summer 2013 he advanced to play in their U-18 and U-21 teams.

=== FC Basel ===
During the winter break of their 2013–14 season, Embolo advanced to Basel's first team under head coach Murat Yakin. After appearing in two test games, Embolo made his professional debut on 13 March 2014 as a 90th-minute substitute for Geoffroy Serey in the Europa League round of 16 first leg at St. Jakob-Park. The match against Red Bull Salzburg ended in a goalless draw. Three days later, he made his domestic league debut in the home game in the St. Jakob-Park, coming on as a substitute in the 85th minute. Embolo scored his first goal for the team four minutes later, concluding a 5–0 win against Aarau. At the end of the 2013–14 Super League season he won the league championship with Basel; they also reached the final of the 2013–14 Swiss Cup, but Embolo sat on the bench as they were beaten 2–0 by Zürich after extra time.

In their 2014–15 season new head coach was Paulo Sousa, and Embolo advanced to becoming a regular player and a regular goal scorer. On 4 November 2014, he scored his first goal in the UEFA Champions League, opening a 4–0 home group win against Ludogorets Razgrad. In the second round of the 2014–15 Swiss Cup, the match on 21 September in the Schützenwiese, Embolo scored his first hat-trick for the team as they won 4–0 against Winterthur to advance to the next round. Basel reached the cup final, however, for the third consecutive season they finished the competition as runners-up. During the 2014–15 league season, in the match at home on 12 April 2015, Embolo scored his first domestic league hat-trick as Basel won 5–1 against Zürich. At the end of the season Basel won the championship for the sixth time in a row. After winning the title, Embolo called Raphael Wicky, the club's under-18 manager, and requested that he play their remaining games now the senior season was over.

Basel hired Urs Fischer as their new head coach for their 2015–16 season. Basel played in the 2015–16 UEFA Europa League group stage, and Embolo achieved two goals in eight appearances and the team completed the group stage coming top in table. Late into the 2016 January transfer window, VfL Wolfsburg made a bid for Embolo, but it was rejected by Basel. The bid was reported to be close to €27 million. Under Fischer, Embolo won a third consecutive Swiss championship at the end of the 2015–16 Super League season. In June 2016, Embolo was described by FourFourTwo as "one of Europe's hottest prospects".

On 26 June 2016 Basel announced that Embolo would leave the club and that he had signed a five-year contract. It was agreed not to disclose the terms of the transfer. During his time with their first team, Embolo played a total of 91 games for Basel and scored 31 goals. 61 of these games were in the Swiss Super League, six in the Swiss Cup and 24 in the UEFA competitions (Champions League and Europa League) . He scored 21 goals in the domestic league, six in the cup, and four in the European games.

=== Schalke 04 ===
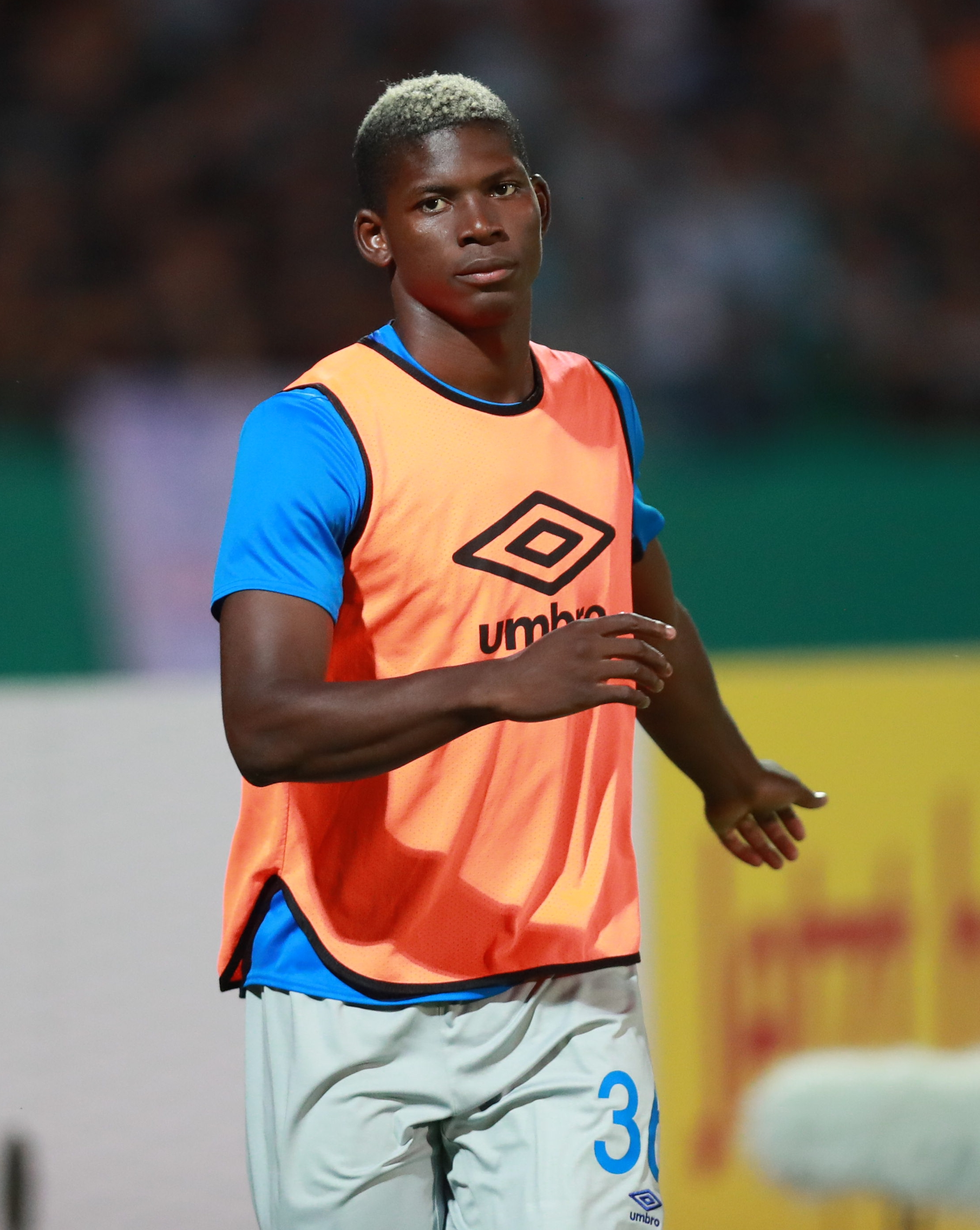
Embolo with Schalke 04 in August 2018

On 26 June 2016, Bundesliga side Schalke 04 confirmed the signing of Embolo from Basel on a five-year deal, for a reported fee of €20 million plus add-ons. He made his debut on 20 August in the first round of the DFB-Pokal away to sixth-tier FC 08 Villingen, starting and scoring in a 4–1 victory. A week later he made his league debut in a 1–0 loss at Eintracht Frankfurt, replacing Franco Di Santo at half time in the season opener.

He scored his first league goals for the Gelsenkirchen-based club on 2 October, a brace in a 4–0 win over Borussia Mönchengladbach. Eleven days later in his next match against Augsburg, he suffered a serious injury following a foul from Kostas Stafylidis, a complicated ankle fracture, ruptured syndesmosis and medial collateral ligament damage which ruled him out for the remainder of the season.

On 16 September 2017, Embolo made his return after missing nearly a full year of football, coming on as an 80th-minute substitute for Amine Harit in a 2–1 win at Werder Bremen.

=== Borussia Mönchengladbach ===
Embolo signed for fellow Bundesliga club Borussia Mönchengladbach on 28 June 2019 on a four-year contract. He made his debut in the first round of the DFB-Pokal on 9 August, coming on at half time for Jonas Hofmann in a 1–0 win at SV Sandhausen. Fifteen days later, again from the bench, he scored his first goal for the club in a 3–1 win at Mainz 05.

On 27 October 2021, Embolo scored twice in a 5–0 surprise win over FC Bayern Munich in the cup second round – Bayern Munich's biggest ever defeat in the DFB-Pokal, and their first ever cup elimination to Gladbach.

=== Monaco ===
On 15 July 2022, Embolo joined Ligue 1 club Monaco for a four-year deal. The transfer fee paid to Mönchengladbach was reported as a little over €12 million. He made his debut on 2 August in a Champions League third qualifying round first leg at home to PSV Eindhoven, as a 76th-minute substitute for Aleksandr Golovin, while his first league game four days later was a start in a 2–1 win at Strasbourg.

On 13 August, he scored his first goal to equalize in a 1–1 draw with Rennes at the Stade Louis II. He scored 14 goals in 40 total appearances during his first season at the club. In the last league match of the season against Toulouse, Embolo came off for Kevin Volland in the closing stages of the game due to a knee injury. While undergoing individual training to regain form ahead of the 2023–24 season, Embolo sustained a severe anterior cruciate ligament injury during a training session, sidelining him for an extended period.

=== Rennes ===
On 1 September 2025, Embolo signed for fellow Ligue 1 club Rennes on a four-year deal. A month later, on 5 October, he netted his first goal for the club in a 2–2 away draw with Le Havre.

=== Atlanta United ===
On 23 August 2026, Embolo joined Major League Soccer club Atlanta United as Designated Player until the 2029–30 season. Embolo made his debut and scored his first goal in a 2-2 draw against Inter Miami on 5 September 2026. Embolo made his home debut against Orlando City, which ended in a 2-3 defeat on 9 September 2026.

== International career ==
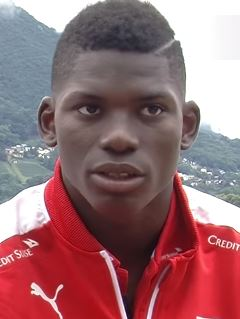
Embolo in June 2016

Embolo made four appearances for the Switzerland U16 national team. He scored his first international goal on 1 November 2012 in the 3–0 away win against the Ukraine U16. He was also eligible to play for Cameroon, however in December 2014 he pledged his international allegiance to Switzerland.

He made his senior international debut on 31 March 2015, replacing Josip Drmić after 56 minutes of an eventual 1–1 friendly draw against the United States in Zürich. On 9 October, he scored his first international goal, a penalty in a 7–0 win over San Marino at the AFG Arena in St Gallen; the result qualified the Swiss to UEFA Euro 2016. In the same game, he also set up Michael Lang for the first goal and won a spot-kick scored by Johan Djourou.

Embolo was selected by manager Vladimir Petković for the final tournament in France. A substitute in the first two group games, he then started against the hosts in a goalless draw in Lille and came off the bench in the last 16, a 1–1 draw and penalty shootout loss to Poland.

In qualification for the 2018 FIFA World Cup, Embolo scored once to open a 2–0 win over European champions Portugal at his former club ground in Basel. Petković named him for the squad to compete in the finals in Russia.

Embolo scored once in UEFA Euro 2020 qualifying, putting the Swiss 3–0 up in an eventual 3–3 draw at home to Denmark on 27 March 2019. At the major tournament, held in 2021, he scored the opener in their first group game, a 1–1 draw with Wales in Baku.

In Switzerland's first game of the 2022 FIFA World Cup against Cameroon, Embolo scored the only goal. He was the second player in World Cup history to score against the country of his birth; the first was Alfred Bickel, also for Switzerland, against Germany in 1938. Out of respect, Embolo chose not to celebrate, standing still with his hands up to his face as his teammates mobbed him and did the more vigorous celebrating. In the final group game against Serbia, he equalized as the Swiss came from behind to win 3–2 and advance to the last 16.

On 7 June 2024, he was selected in the 26-man squad for the UEFA Euro 2024. On 15 June, he scored a stoppage-time goal, securing a 3–1 victory over Hungary in Switzerland's opening match of the tournament.

On 20 May 2026, he was named in Switzerland's squad for the 2026 FIFA World Cup. His participation was initially in doubt after he was denied entry to the United States due to a 2023 conviction for making threats during a 5am altercation in Basel, for which he received a suspended fine. He was later granted entry clearance and remained eligible to participate in the tournament. On 13 June, he scored Switzerland's first goal of the tournament from a penalty in the 17th minute of their opening match against Qatar. He later scored a goal and was named Man of the Match in a 2–0 victory over Algeria in the Round of 32. In the quarter-final against Argentina, he received a second yellow card for simulation and was sent off by Portuguese referee João Pinheiro following a VAR review, with the match level at 1–1. His team was reduced to 10 men, and the match ended in a 3–1 defeat after extra time.

== Style of play ==
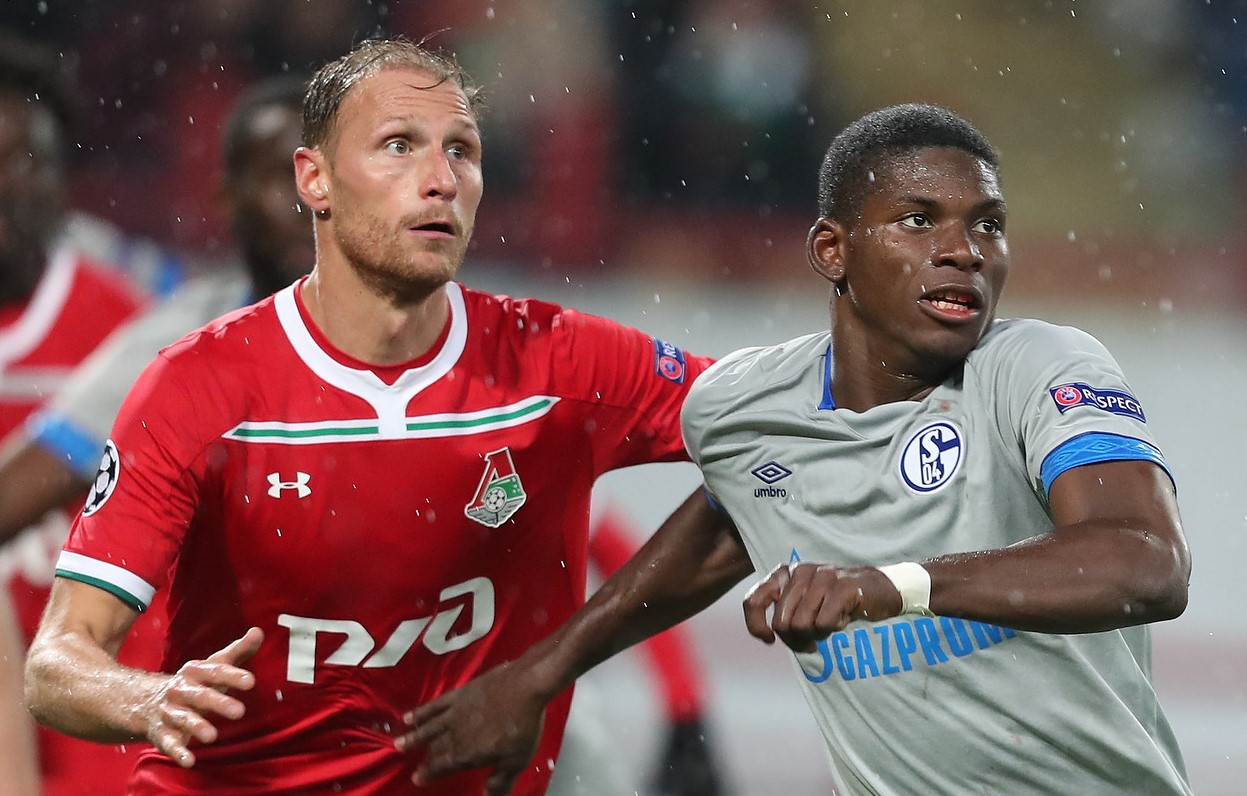
Embolo challenging with Benedikt Höwedes of Lokomotiv Moscow in October 2018

UEFA.com writer Steffen Potter praised Embolo as a complete striker: "He is powerful, technically strong and decisive. He has explosive pace and is a composed finisher." Fabian Frei, who was a midfielder for FC Basel at the same time with Embolo, complimented him as well, for keeping his feet on the ground.

I think he is a sensation – playing like that aged 17. I like him as a person as much as I do as a player. His feet will stay on the ground – he won't be shooting from 50 metres to score the goal of the season. You can give him good advice and he is ready to take it without getting angry.

Embolo has cited Mario Balotelli as one of his inspirations. Both players like to lurk between defenders, and both have great control allied to physical prowess.

Embolo can also play in midfield; according to David Lemos of Radio Télévision Suisse he resembles N'Golo Kanté in this role, using his power to retrieve the ball and give it to the attackers.

== Personal life ==
At the age of 18, he created the Embolo Foundation to support refugee children in Switzerland and disadvantaged youth in his birth country of Cameroon. Embolo received Swiss citizenship in 2014. He had to renounce his Cameroonian citizenship because Cameroon does not recognize dual citizenship. Embolo has two children with his girlfriend Naomi; his daughter was born in 2018 and his son in 2019.

== Career statistics ==
=== Club ===
As of match played 7 November 2026

Appearances and goals by club, season and competition
Club	Season	League			National cup (Note: Includes Swiss Cup, DFB-Pokal, Coupe de France)		Continental		Other		Total	
Club	Season	Division	Apps	Goals	Apps	Goals	Apps	Goals	Apps	Goals	Apps	Goals
Basel	2013–14	Swiss Super League	7	1	0	0	4 (Note: Appearances in UEFA Europa League)	0	—		11	1
Basel	2014–15	Swiss Super League	27	10	5	6	8 (Note: Appearances in UEFA Champions League)	1	—		40	17
Basel	2015–16	Swiss Super League	27	10	1	0	12 (Note: Four appearances and one goal in UEFA Champions League, eight appearances and two goals in UEFA Europa League)	3	—		40	13
Basel	Total		61	21	6	6	24	4	—		91	31
Schalke 04	2016–17	Bundesliga	7	2	1	1	2	0	—		10	3
Schalke 04	2017–18	Bundesliga	21	3	2	0	—		—		23	3
Schalke 04	2018–19	Bundesliga	20	5	3	0	5	1	—		28	6
Schalke 04	Total		48	10	6	1	7	1	—		61	12
Borussia Mönchengladbach	2019–20	Bundesliga	28	8	1	0	5	0	—		34	8
Borussia Mönchengladbach	2020–21	Bundesliga	31	5	3	0	7	1	—		41	6
Borussia Mönchengladbach	2021–22	Bundesliga	29	9	2	2	—		—		31	11
Borussia Mönchengladbach	Total		88	22	6	2	12	1	—		106	25
Monaco	2022–23	Ligue 1	32	12	0	0	10 (Note: Two appearances in UEFA Champions League, eight appearances and two goals in UEFA Europa League)	2	—		42	14
Monaco	2023–24	Ligue 1	5	1	0	0	—		—		5	1
Monaco	2024–25	Ligue 1	29	6	2	0	10	1	1 (Note: Appearance in Trophée des Champions)	0	42	7
Monaco	Total		66	19	2	0	20	3	1	0	89	22
Rennes	2025–26	Ligue 1	31	8	3	2	—		—		34	10
Atlanta United	2026	Major League Soccer	12	4	—		—		—		12	4
Career total			306	84	23	11	63	9	1	0	393	104

=== International ===
As of match played 16 November 2026

Appearances and goals by national team and year
National team	Year	Apps	Goals
Switzerland	2015	7	1
Switzerland	2016	10	1
Switzerland	2017	4	0
Switzerland	2018	9	1
Switzerland	2019	6	1
Switzerland	2020	4	0
Switzerland	2021	10	4
Switzerland	2022	13	5
Switzerland	2023	0	0
Switzerland	2024	10	2
Switzerland	2025	10	7
Switzerland	2026	11	4
Total		94	26

Scores and results list Switzerland's goal tally first, score column indicates score after each Embolo goal.

List of international goals scored by Breel Embolo
No.	Date	Venue	Cap	Opponent	Score	Result	Competition
1	9 October 2015	AFG Arena, St. Gallen, Switzerland	6	San Marino	6–0	7–0	UEFA Euro 2016 qualifying
2	6 September 2016	St. Jakob-Park, Basel, Switzerland	15	Portugal	1–0	2–0	2018 FIFA World Cup qualification
3	27 March 2018	Swissporarena, Lucerne, Switzerland	23	Panama	3–0	6–0	Friendly
4	26 March 2019	St. Jakob-Park, Basel, Switzerland	32	Denmark	3–0	3–3	UEFA Euro 2020 qualifying
5	25 March 2021	Vasil Levski National Stadium, Sofia, Bulgaria	41	Bulgaria	1–0	3–1	2022 FIFA World Cup qualification
6	12 June 2021	Baku Olympic Stadium, Baku, Azerbaijan	44	Wales	1–0	1–1	UEFA Euro 2020
7	12 October 2021	LFF Stadium, Vilnius, Lithuania	50	Lithuania	1–0	4–0	2022 FIFA World Cup qualification
8	12 October 2021	LFF Stadium, Vilnius, Lithuania	50	Lithuania	3–0	4–0	2022 FIFA World Cup qualification
9	26 March 2022	Wembley Stadium, London, England	51	England	1–0	1–2	Friendly
10	24 September 2022	La Romareda, Zaragoza, Spain	57	Spain	2–1	2–1	2022–23 UEFA Nations League A
11	27 September 2022	Kybunpark, St. Gallen, Switzerland	58	Czech Republic	2–0	2–1	2022–23 UEFA Nations League A
12	24 November 2022	Al Janoub Stadium, Al Wakrah, Qatar	60	Cameroon	1–0	1–0	2022 FIFA World Cup
13	2 December 2022	Stadium 974, Doha, Qatar	62	Serbia	2–2	3–2	2022 FIFA World Cup
14	15 June 2024	RheinEnergieStadion, Cologne, Germany	64	Hungary	3–1	3–1	UEFA Euro 2024
15	6 July 2024	Merkur Spiel-Arena, Düsseldorf, Germany	68	England	1–0	1–1 (a.e.t.) (3–5 p)	UEFA Euro 2024
16	25 March 2025	Kybunpark, St. Gallen, Switzerland	75	Luxembourg	2–0	3–1	Friendly
17	7 June 2025	Rice–Eccles Stadium, Salt Lake City, United States	76	Mexico	1–0	4–2	Friendly
18	10 June 2025	Geodis Park, Nashville, United States	77	United States	3–0	4–0	Friendly
19	5 September 2025	St. Jakob-Park, Basel, Switzerland	78	Kosovo	2–0	4–0	2026 FIFA World Cup qualification
20	5 September 2025	St. Jakob-Park, Basel, Switzerland	78	Kosovo	4–0	4–0	2026 FIFA World Cup qualification
21	8 September 2025	St. Jakob-Park, Basel, Switzerland	79	Slovenia	2–0	3–0	2026 FIFA World Cup qualification
22	15 November 2025	Stade de Genève, Geneva, Switzerland	82	Sweden	1–0	4–1	2026 FIFA World Cup qualification
23	27 March 2026	St. Jakob-Park, Basel, Switzerland	84	Germany	2–1	3–4	Friendly
24	31 May 2026	Kybunpark, St. Gallen, Switzerland	86	Jordan	1–0	4–1	Friendly
25	13 June 2026	Levi's Stadium, Santa Clara, United States	87	Qatar	1–0	1–1	2026 FIFA World Cup
26	2 July 2026	BC Place, Vancouver, Canada	90	Algeria	1–0	2–0	2026 FIFA World Cup

== Honours ==
Basel

- Swiss Super League: 2013–14, 2014–15, 2015–16
- Swiss Cup runner-up: 2013–14, 2014–15

Individual

- FC Basel Young Player of the Year: 2013
- Swiss Footballer of the Year: 2015
- Swiss Cup top scorer: 2014–15
- Swiss Super League Young Player of the Year: 2014–15
- Swiss Super League Player of the Year: 2015–16
- Swiss Super League Team of the Year: 2015–16
