= Manuel Akanji =

Swiss footballer (born 1995)

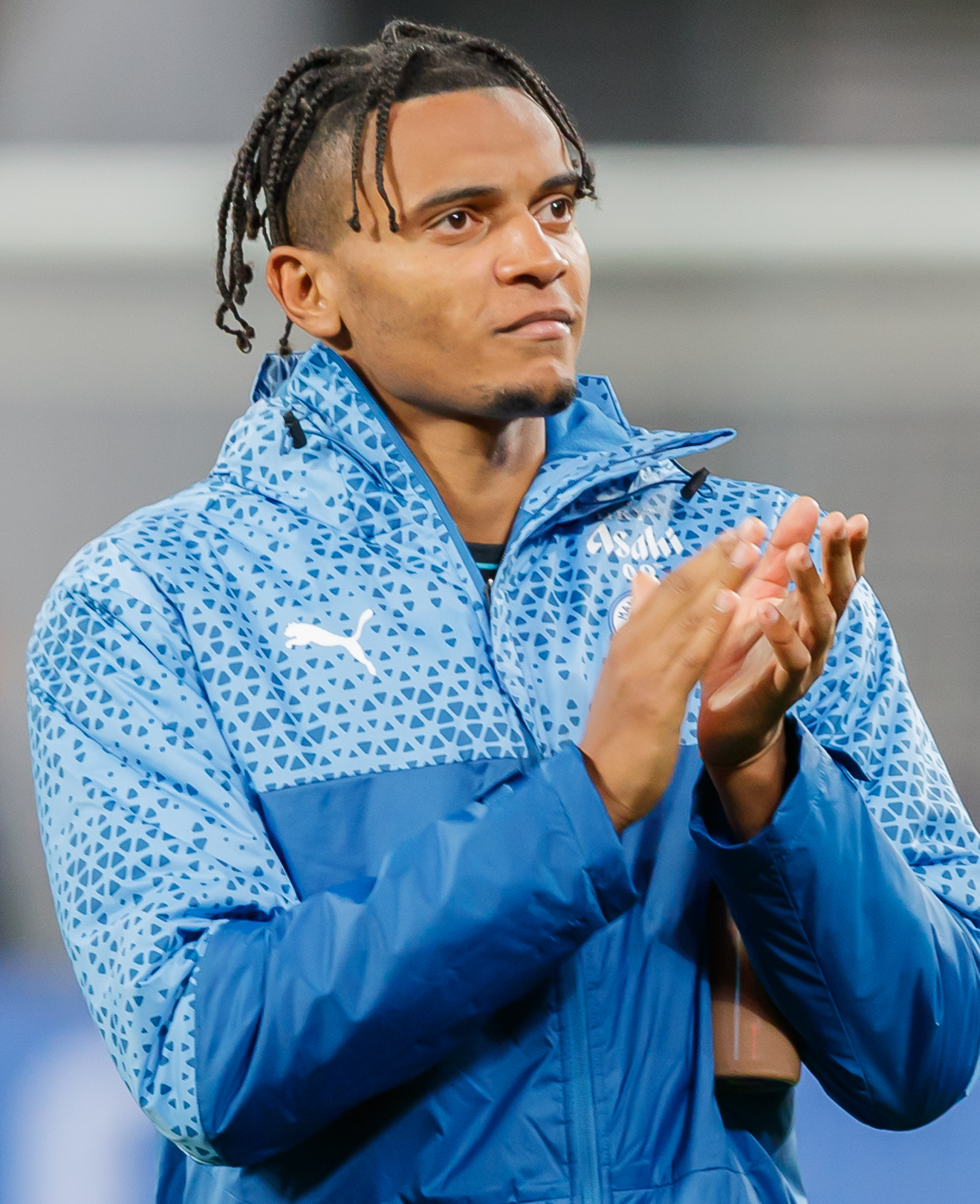
- Akanji with Manchester City in 2023

Personal information
- Full name: Manuel Obafemi Akanji
- Date of birth: 19 July 1995 (age 31)
- Place of birth: Neftenbach, Switzerland
- Height: 1.86 m (6 ft 1 in)
- Position: Defender

Team information
- Current team: Inter Milan
- Number: 25

Youth career
- 2004–2007: FC Wiesendangen
- 2007–2013: FC Winterthur

Senior career*
Years	Team	Apps	(Gls)
2013–2014	FC Winterthur II	18	(0)
2014–2015	FC Winterthur	35	(1)
2015–2016	FC Basel II	4	(0)
2015–2018	FC Basel	42	(5)
2018–2022	Borussia Dortmund	119	(4)
2022–2026	Manchester City	85	(2)
2025–2026	→ Inter Milan (loan)	33	(2)
2026–	Inter Milan	11	(0)

International career^{‡}
2014	Switzerland U20	2	(0)
2014–2015	Switzerland U21	6	(0)
2017–	Switzerland	92	(4)
- * Club domestic league appearances and goals as of 22:40, 22 November 2026 (UTC) ‡ National team caps and goals as of 23:45, 13 November 2026 (UTC)

Manuel Obafemi Akanji (Swiss Standard German pronunciation: [ˈmaː.nu.ɛl aˈkan.dʒi]; born 19 July 1995) is a Swiss professional footballer who plays as a defender for Serie A club Inter Milan and the Switzerland national team.

An academy graduate of FC Winterthur, Akanji's professional career began in 2014, when he made his debut for the then-Swiss Challenge League club, having also previously played for the club's second team. He moved to first tier FC Basel in 2015, where he won consecutive league titles in 2015–16 and 2016–17, the latter of which was a double that included the Swiss Cup. Following his success with Basel, Akanji was sold to Borussia Dortmund during the winter transfer window of 2018. During his stay in the Bundesliga, he helped Dortmund win the 2019 DFL-Supercup and the 2020–21 DFB-Pokal. He joined Manchester City in 2022, winning a continental treble in his first season with the club, as well as numerous other trophies, including one more Premier League title in 2023–24. Akanji was loaned to Inter Milan in 2025, helping the side win a Serie A and Coppa Italia double before joining the club permanently the following season.

Internationally, Akanji represents Switzerland, making his debut for the senior team in 2017 after featuring for the under-20 and under-21 sides. He was a member of Switzerland's squad for two editions of the UEFA European Championship, in 2020 and 2024, as well as three FIFA World Cups, in 2018, 2022, and 2026.

== Club career ==
=== Youth football and early career ===
Akanji began his youth career with the local club in Wiesendangen. In May 2007, Akanji changed clubs and was a youth-team player for FC Winterthur, featuring for their under-18 team and later with their second team. In the 2014–15 Challenge League, he became a regular starter for Winterthur, having played two games for them during the second half of the previous season.

=== FC Basel ===
On 15 April 2015, it was announced that Akanji would be transferred to FC Basel for the 2015–16 Swiss Super League season. He made his Swiss Super League debut on 26 September 2015 being substituted in against FC Lugano. Under manager Urs Fischer, Akanji won the Swiss Super League championship at the end of the 2015–16 Super League season. Basel then won the 2016–17 Swiss Super League and 2016–17 Swiss Cup double, making it the sixth time the club had achieved this feat in its history.

As Swiss Champions, Basel qualified for the 2017–18 UEFA Champions League and started in the group stage. Akanji played the full 90 minutes in all six games and helped the team finish second in its group, thus qualifying for the knockout phase.

=== Borussia Dortmund ===
Akanji signed for Borussia Dortmund on 15 January 2018 during the winter transfer window for a reported fee of €18 million He signed a four-and-a-half-year contract dated until June 2022. On 2 February, Akanji made his BVB debut as an 87th minute substitute for André Schürrle in a 3–2 win at 1. FC Köln.

On 27 September 2018, Akanji scored his first goal for the club and his first Bundesliga goal in a 7–0 victory over 1. FC Nürnberg. Akanji was widely criticised for his costly errors during Dortmund's failed challenge to Bayern Munich during the 2019–20 season. Akanji was one of the main players singled out as a weak link in the team. Akanji played the full 90 minutes as Dortmund beat RB Leipzig 4–1 in the 2021 DFB-Pokal Final at the Berlin Olympiastadion on 13 May 2021.

=== Manchester City ===
==== 2022–23 season ====
On 1 September 2022, Akanji joined Premier League champions Manchester City, signing a contract until 2027 for a reported fee of £15 million. He made his debut for City five days later, starting in a 4–0 away win over Sevilla in the Champions League group stage.

He made his Premier League debut on 17 September, starting in a 3–0 away win over Wolverhampton Wanderers. He was voted the club's Player of the Month for October. On 17 May 2023, he scored his first goal for the club, which was also his first in the Champions League, with a header deflected by Éder Militão in a 4–0 home win over Real Madrid in the semi-final second leg. During the 2022–23 Premier League, Akanji played more minutes than any other Manchester City defender.

==== 2023–24 season ====
On 21 October 2023, Akanji received his first red card for Manchester City in a 2–1 win over Brighton & Hove Albion in the Premier League. On 25 October, he scored his first goal of the season in a 3–1 win over BSC Young Boys in the Champions League. He scored his first Premier League goal in a 6–1 win over Bournemouth on 4 November and, on 12 November, scored in a third consecutive match as City drew 4–4 with Chelsea at Stamford Bridge.

==== 2024–25 season ====
On 10 August 2024, Akanji scored the winning penalty as Manchester City defeated Manchester United 7–6 on penalties to win the 2024 FA Community Shield after a 1–1 draw in regular time.

=== Inter Milan ===
On 2 September 2025, Akanji joined Serie A side Inter Milan on a season-long loan.

On 1 July 2026, Akanji's transfer to Inter Milan was made permanent.

== International career ==
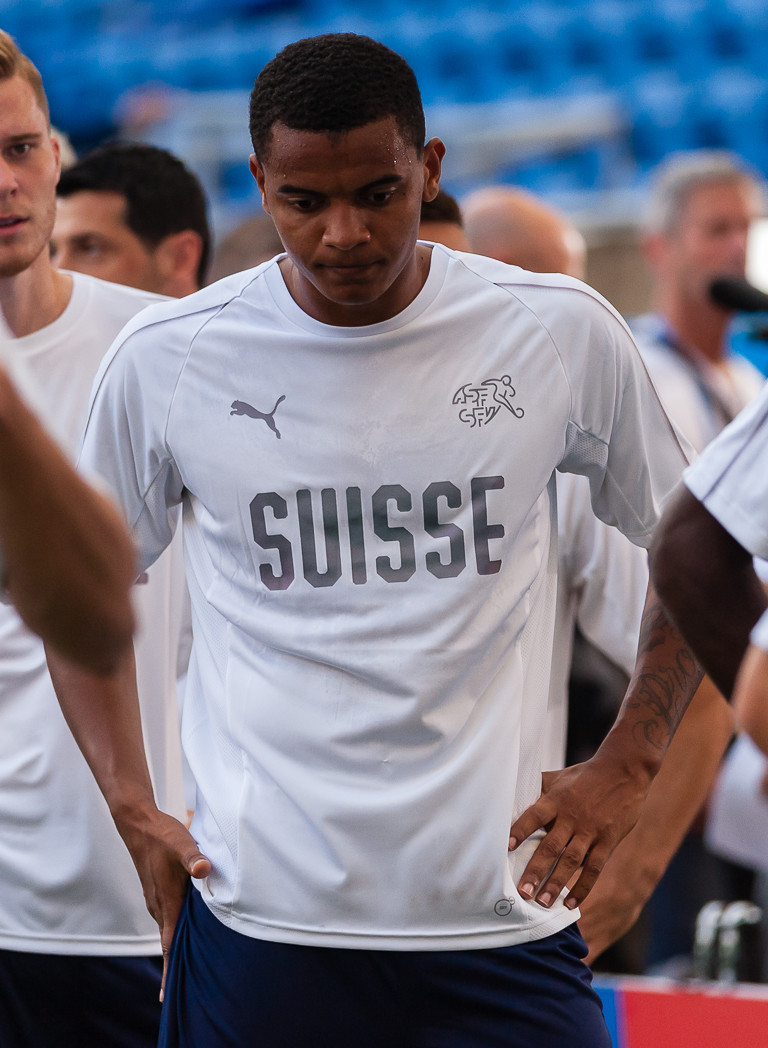
Akanji with Switzerland at the 2018 FIFA World Cup

Akanji made two appearances for the Switzerland U-20 national team. His debut was on 7 September 2014 in the 0–0 draw against the German U-20 national team. From 2014, he was a member of the Switzerland U-21 team and made his debut for them on 26 March in the 0–3 defeat by the Italian U-21 team. On 9 June 2017, Akanji made his debut for the Swiss senior team in a 2–0 win against Faroe Islands in a 2018 World Cup qualifying match, where he played the entire 90 minutes. He was included in Switzerland's 23-man squad for the 2018 FIFA World Cup in Russia and started all four of the team's matches as they reached the round of 16. In May 2019, Akanji played in 2019 UEFA Nations League Finals, where his team finished fourth.

In 2021, he was named in the Swiss squad for UEFA Euro 2020. He started all five of Switzerland's matches as they reached the quarter-finals, scoring his kick as the Swiss beat France in a penalty shootout in the round of 16. However, in the quarter-final against Spain, he was one of three Swiss players to miss their spot kicks in the 4–2 penalty shootout loss.

On 24 September 2022, Akanji scored his first senior international goal against Spain in a 2–1 UEFA Nations League victory. Akanji was a member of the Swiss squad for the 2022 FIFA World Cup and, on 7 December 2022, he scored the only goal for Switzerland in a 6–1 loss to Portugal in the round of 16.

On 7 June 2024, Akanji was named in Switzerland's squad for UEFA Euro 2024. He played the full match in the team's opening Group A fixture on 15 June, as the Nati defeated Hungary 3–1 in Cologne. He helped Switzerland reach the quarter-finals for a second consecutive European Championship, where his team was eventually eliminated by England on penalties. Akanji took the first spot kick for Switzerland in the shoot-out, which Jordan Pickford saved, and with both teams scoring their remaining penalties, England advanced by winning 5–3. For his performances, Akanji was selected in the Team of the Tournament.

On 20 May 2026, Akanji was selected in the 26-man squad for the 2026 FIFA World Cup.

== Style of play ==
Akanji is known for his cultured style of play, which is characterised by his technical ability, composure on the ball, and excellent passing range. He is also a strong and physical defender who is comfortable in one-on-one situations and is adept at intercepting passes and making tackles.

His ability to read the game and make crucial interceptions as well as his calmness under pressure is well known among fans of the Premier League. Akanji's passing ability is also a key part of his game, and he is often involved in building attacks from the back. His long-range passing is particularly noteworthy, and he is capable of playing accurate diagonal balls to switch the play and create space for his teammates. Due to his passing abilities, Akanji has been deployed as both a left-back and right-back, as well as occasionally a libero, much like teammate John Stones, by City manager Pep Guardiola.

== Personal life ==
Akanji was born in Neftenbach, Switzerland, to a Swiss mother and a Nigerian father. His sister Sarah is a former footballer for FC Winterthur Frauen and a Social Democratic Party of Switzerland politician.

In 2017, already a professional player, he completed his vocational training as a tradesman (″Kaufmann″). On Swiss TV in 2018 he showed excellent skills at mental calculation.

== Career statistics ==
=== Club ===
As of match played 22 November 2026

Appearances and goals by club, season and competition
Club	Season	League			National cup (Note: Includes Swiss Cup, DFB-Pokal, FA Cup, Coppa Italia)		League cup (Note: Includes EFL Cup)		Europe		Other		Total	
Club	Season	Division	Apps	Goals	Apps	Goals	Apps	Goals	Apps	Goals	Apps	Goals	Apps	Goals
FC Winterthur II	2013–14	1. Liga Classic	18	0	—		—		—		—		18	0
FC Winterthur	2013–14	Swiss Challenge League	2	0	0	0	—		—		—		2	0
FC Winterthur	2014–15	Swiss Challenge League	33	1	2	0	—		—		—		35	1
FC Winterthur	Total		35	1	2	0	—		—		—		37	1
FC Basel II	2015–16	Swiss Promotion League	3	0	—		—		—		—		3	0
FC Basel II	2016–17	Swiss Promotion League	1	0	—		—		—		—		1	0
FC Basel II	Total		4	0	—		—		—		—		4	0
FC Basel	2015–16	Swiss Super League	8	0	3	0	—		1 (Note: Appearance in UEFA Europa League)	0	—		12	0
FC Basel	2016–17	Swiss Super League	15	4	3	1	—		0	0	—		18	5
FC Basel	2017–18	Swiss Super League	19	1	3	1	—		6 (Note: Appearances in UEFA Champions League)	0	—		28	2
FC Basel	Total		42	5	9	2	—		7	0	—		58	7
Borussia Dortmund	2017–18	Bundesliga	11	0	—		—		0	0	—		11	0
Borussia Dortmund	2018–19	Bundesliga	25	1	1	0	—		5	0	—		31	1
Borussia Dortmund	2019–20	Bundesliga	29	0	3	0	—		6	0	1 (Note: Appearance in DFL-Supercup)	0	39	0
Borussia Dortmund	2020–21	Bundesliga	28	2	5	0	—		7	0	1	0	41	2
Borussia Dortmund	2021–22	Bundesliga	26	1	3	0	—		6 (Note: Five appearances in UEFA Champions League, one appearance in UEFA Europa League)	0	1	0	36	1
Borussia Dortmund	Total		119	4	12	0	—		24	0	3	0	158	4
Manchester City	2022–23	Premier League	29	0	6	0	2	0	11	1	—		48	1
Manchester City	2023–24	Premier League	30	2	5	0	1	0	8	2	4 (Note: One appearance in FA Community Shield, one appearance in UEFA Super Cup, two appearances in FIFA Club World Cup)	0	48	4
Manchester City	2024–25	Premier League	26	0	2	0	0	0	8	0	4 (Note: One appearance in FA Community Shield, three appearances in FIFA Club World Cup)	0	40	0
Manchester City	Total		85	2	13	0	3	0	27	3	8	0	136	5
Inter Milan (loan)	2025–26	Serie A	33	2	2	0	—		10	0	0	0	45	2
Inter Milan	2026–27	Serie A	11	0	0	0	—		3	0	0	0	14	0
Inter Milan	Inter total		44	2	2	0	—		13	0	0	0	59	2
Career total			347	14	38	2	3	0	71	3	11	0	470	19

=== International ===
As of match played 13 November 2026

Appearances and goals by national team and year
National team	Year	Apps	Goals
Switzerland	2017	4	0
Switzerland	2018	9	0
Switzerland	2019	9	0
Switzerland	2020	3	0
Switzerland	2021	13	0
Switzerland	2022	9	2
Switzerland	2023	10	1
Switzerland	2024	12	0
Switzerland	2025	8	1
Switzerland	2026	15	0
Total		92	4

As of match played 5 September 2025
Scores and results list Switzerland's goal tally first, score column indicates score after each Akanji goal

List of international goals scored by Manuel Akanji
No.	Date	Venue	Opponent	Score	Result	Competition
1	24 September 2022	La Romareda, Zaragoza, Spain	Spain	1–0	2–1	2022–23 UEFA Nations League A
2	6 December 2022	Lusail Stadium, Lusail, Qatar	Portugal	1–4	1–6	2022 FIFA World Cup
3	15 October 2023	Kybunpark, St. Gallen, Switzerland	Belarus	2–3	3–3	UEFA Euro 2024 qualifying
4	5 September 2025	St. Jakob-Park, Basel, Switzerland	Kosovo	1–0	4–0	2026 FIFA World Cup qualification

== Honours ==
FC Basel

- Swiss Super League: 2015–16, 2016–17
- Swiss Cup: 2016–17

Borussia Dortmund

- DFB-Pokal: 2020–21
- DFL-Supercup: 2019

Manchester City

- Premier League: 2022–23, 2023–24
- FA Cup: 2022–23; runner-up: 2023–24, 2024–25
- FA Community Shield: 2024
- UEFA Champions League: 2022–23
- UEFA Super Cup: 2023
- FIFA Club World Cup: 2023

Inter Milan

- Serie A: 2025–26
- Coppa Italia: 2025–26

Individual

- Swiss Super League Team of the Year: 2017–18
- UEFA European Championship Team of the Tournament: 2024
- EA Sports FC Serie A Team of the Season: 2025–26
- Serie A Team of the Year: 2025–26
