= Moustapha Bayal Sall =

Senegalese footballer (born 1985)

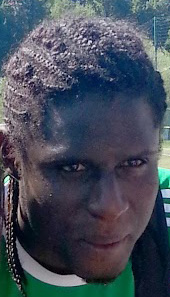

Personal information
- Date of birth: 30 November 1985 (age 40)
- Place of birth: Dakar, Senegal
- Height: 1.94 m (6 ft 4 in)
- Position: Centre-back

Team information
- Current team: Al Faisaly SC

Senior career*
Years	Team	Apps	(Gls)
2005–2006	Gorée	3	(1)
2006–2016	Saint-Étienne	175	(5)
2012	→ Nancy (loan)	2	(1)
2016–2017	Al-Arabi	15	(1)
2017–2018	Royal Antwerp	11	(0)
2019–2021	Lyon-Duchère	6	(0)
2021–	Al Faisaly SC		

International career
2005–2013	Senegal	29	(1)
- * Club domestic league appearances and goals as of 20:59, 12 September 2019 (UTC)

Moustapha Bayal Sall (born 30 November 1985) is a Senegalese professional footballer who plays as a centre-back for Jordanian club Al Faisaly SC. At international level, he has represented Senegal, earning 29 caps and scoring one goal.

== Playing career ==
In March 2007 Bayal Sall signed a contract with IK Start. But three months later, having never played a game for the club, he signed for AS Saint-Étienne. Start brought the matter to FIFA and on 3 December 2007 Sall was handed a four-month ban due to start in July 2008 and Saint-Étienne were ordered to pay $150,000 in compensation to the Norwegian club.

In January 2012 Bayal Sall went on a six-month loan to AS Nancy-Lorraine. He was put aside by the management in Saint-Étienne, according to him because of personal problems with manager Christophe Galtier, and therefore not playing anymore.

He joined Qatari club Al-Arabi during the summer of 2016.

He agreed the termination of his contract with Royal Antwerp of the Belgian First Division A in April 2018.

A free agent since leaving Antwerp, Bayall Sall returned to France joining Championnat National side AS Lyon-Duchère in July 2019.

In April 2021, he signed a contract with Al Faisaly of Jordan.

== Honours ==
Saint-Étienne

- French League Cup: 2012–13
