= Marko Bašić (footballer, born 1988) =

Croatian footballer

Personal information
- Date of birth: 25 May 1988 (age 38)
- Place of birth: Zagreb, SR Croatia, Yugoslavia
- Height: 1.88 m (6 ft 2 in)
- Positions: Centre-back; defensive midfielder

Team information
- Current team: Lugano II
- Number: 5

Youth career
- 1995–2001: Dinamo Zagreb
- 2001–2003: Maksimir
- 2003: Kamen Ingrad
- 2004–2005: Maksimir
- 2005–2007: Kamen Ingrad

Senior career*
Years	Team	Apps	(Gls)
2006–2008	Kamen Ingrad	17	(0)
2009–2015	Lugano	168	(27)
2015–2019	Grasshoppers	87	(9)
2020	Taizhou Yuanda	11	(0)
2021–2022	Bellinzona	27	(3)
2022–2024	Lugano II	31	(4)
Total		341	(43)
- * Club domestic league appearances and goals

Marko Bašić (born 25 May 1988) is a Croatian footballer who plays for Swiss 1. Liga side Lugano II.

== Club career ==
He had a spell with China League One side Taizhou Yuanda.

On 10 July 2022, Bašić returned to Lugano to play for their reserves team in the fourth-tier Swiss 1. Liga.

== Career statistics ==
Appearances and goals by club, season and competition
Club	Season	League			National Cup		Continental		Other		Total	
Club	Season	Division	Apps	Goals	Apps	Goals	Apps	Goals	Apps	Goals	Apps	Goals
Kamen Ingrad	2006–07	1. HNL	1	0	0	0	—		—		1	0
Kamen Ingrad	2007–08	2. HNL	16	0	0	0	—		—		16	0
Kamen Ingrad	Total		17	0	0	0	—		—		17	0
Lugano	2008–09	Swiss Challenge League	1	0	0	0	—		—		1	0
Lugano	2009–10	Swiss Challenge League	28	3	3	1	—		—		31	4
Lugano	2010–11	Swiss Challenge League	27	2	3	0	—		—		30	2
Lugano	2011–12	Swiss Challenge League	15	1	1	0	—		—		16	1
Lugano	2012–13	Swiss Challenge League	30	5	2	0	—		—		32	5
Lugano	2013–14	Swiss Challenge League	34	5	2	0	—		—		36	5
Lugano	2014–15	Swiss Challenge League	33	11	2	2	—		—		35	13
Lugano	Total		168	27	13	3	—		—		181	30
Grasshopper Club Zürich	2015–16	Swiss Super League	29	3	2	1	—		—		31	4
Grasshopper Club Zürich	2016–17	Swiss Super League	16	1	3	0	5	0	—		24	1
Grasshopper Club Zürich	2017–18	Swiss Super League	20	3	4	0	—		—		24	3
Grasshopper Club Zürich	2018–19	Swiss Super League	7	0	0	0	—		—		7	0
Grasshopper Club Zürich	2019–20	Swiss Challenge League	15	2	2	0	—		—		17	2
Grasshopper Club Zürich	Total		87	9	11	1	5	0	—		103	10
Taizhou Yuanda	2020	China League One	11	0	0	0	—		—		11	0
Bellinzona	2021–22	Swiss Promotion League	27	3	—		—		—		27	3
Lugano II	2022–23	1. Liga Classic	25	4	—		—		0	0	25	4
Lugano II	2023–24	Swiss Promotion League	6	0	—		—		—		6	0
Lugano II	Total		31	4	—		—		—		31	4
Career total			341	43	24	4	5	0	0	0	370	47
