= 2009–10 FC Zürich season =

Zürich
2009–10 season
- Manager: Bernard Challandes (until 19 April); Urs Fischer (caretaker, from 19 April)
- Stadium: Letzigrund
- Swiss Super League: 7th
- Swiss Cup: Third round
- UEFA Champions League: Group stage
Home colours	Away colours

The 2009–10 season was Fussballclub Zürich's 20th consecutive season in the Swiss Super League and 113th year in existence as a football club. In addition to the domestic league, Zürich participated in this season's editions of the Swiss Cup and UEFA Champions League.

== Squad ==
Note: Flags indicate national team as defined under FIFA eligibility rules; some limited exceptions apply. Players may hold more than one non-FIFA nationality.

No.	Pos.	Nation	Player
1	GK	SUI	Johnny Leoni
3	DF	SUI	Ricardo Rodriguez
4	DF	SUI	Raphael Koch
5	MF	SUI	Xavier Margairaz
7	MF	SUI	Silvan Aegerter
8	MF	SUI	Johan Vonlanthen
10	MF	NGR	Onyekachi Okonkwo
11	MF	SUI	Adrian Nikçi
12	FW	FRA	Alexandre Alphonse
13	DF	SUI	Florian Stahel
14	MF	SWE	Dusan Djuric
16	DF	SUI	Philippe Koch
17	MF	TUN	Yassine Chikhaoui

No.	Pos.	Nation	Player
18	GK	SUI	René Borkovic
19	DF	SUI	Alain Rochat
20	MF	SRB	Milan Gajić
21	DF	SUI	Heinz Barmettler
23	DF	SUI	Ludovic Magnin
25	FW	SUI	Admir Mehmedi
26	MF	SUI	Oliver Buff
27	FW	SUI	Marco Schönbächler
28	FW	SUI	Josip Drmić
29	FW	FRA	Eric Hassli
30	DF	FIN	Hannu Tihinen
32	GK	ITA	Andrea Guatelli

== Competitions ==
=== Overview ===
Competition	First match	Last match	Starting round	Final position	Record							
Competition	First match	Last match	Starting round	Final position	Pld	W	D	L	GF	GA	GD	Win %
Swiss Super League	14 July 2009	16 May 2010	Matchday 1	7th	36	12	9	15	55	58	−3	33.33
Swiss Cup	19 September 2009	20 November 2009	First round	Third round	3	2	0	1	19	4	+15	66.67
UEFA Champions League	29 July 2009	8 December 2009	Third qualifying round	Group stage	10	4	1	5	00	00	+0	40.00
Total					49	18	10	21	74	62	+12	36.73

Source: Competitions

=== Swiss Super League ===
==== League table ====
Pos	Team	Pld	W	D	L	GF	GA	GD	Pts	Qualification or relegation
5	Sion	36	14	9	13	63	57	+6	51	
6	St. Gallen	36	13	7	16	53	56	−3	46	
7	Zürich	36	12	9	15	55	58	−3	45	
8	Neuchâtel Xamax	36	11	8	17	55	57	−2	41	
9	Bellinzona (O)	36	7	4	25	42	92	−50	25	Qualification to relegation play-offs

Source: axposuperleague.ch (in German)
Rules for classification: 1) points; 2) goal difference; 3) number of goals scored.
(O) Play-off winners

==== Results summary ====
Overall								Home						Away					
Pld	W	D	L	GF	GA	GD	Pts	W	D	L	GF	GA	GD	W	D	L	GF	GA	GD
36	12	9	15	55	58	−3	45	9	4	5	31	20	+11	3	5	10	24	38	−14

Source: Competitions

==== Matches ====
14 July 2009 1	Zürich	2–3	Young Boys	Zürich
20:15 CEST (UTC+2)	Hassli 35'; Rochat 62'	Report	Yapo 19'; Regazzoni 24'; Doumbia 75' (pen.)	Stadium: Letzigrund; Referee: Stephan Studer

18 July 2009 2	Neuchâtel Xamax	3–0	Zürich	Neuchâtel
17:45 CEST (UTC+2)	Nuzzolo 30'; Ideye 47' (pen.), 63'	Report		Stadium: Stade de la Maladière; Referee: Cyril Zimmermann

22 July 2009 4	Zürich	1–0	St. Gallen	Zürich
19:45 CEST (UTC+2)	Hassli 67'	Report		Stadium: Letzigrund; Referee: Alain Bieri

25 July 2009 3	Zürich	4–1	Bellinzona	Zürich
17:45 CEST (UTC+2)	Djuric 10'; Rochat 68'; Margairaz 75' (pen.); Vasquez 90'	Report	Lustrinelli 77'	Stadium: Letzigrund; Referee: Patrick Graf

9 August 2009 5	Basel	1–1	Zürich	Basel
16:00 CEST (UTC+2)	Huggel 89'	Report	Vonlanthen 87'	Stadium: St. Jakob-Park; Referee: Massimo Busacca

15 August 2009 6	Sion	3–3	Zürich	Sion
17:45 CEST (UTC+2)	Marin 8'; Obradović 42'; Domínguez 55' (pen.)	Report	Margairaz 39'; Tihinen 72'; Vonlanthen 88' (pen.)	Stadium: Stade Tourbillon; Referee: Claudio Circhetta

22 August 2009 7	Zürich	4–0	Luzern	Zürich
17:45 CEST (UTC+2)	Alphonse 60'; Hassli 62'; Vonlanthen 83'; Djuric 90'	Report		Stadium: Letzigrund; Referee: Jérôme Laperrière

29 August 2009 8	Aarau	1–1	Zürich	Aarau
17:45 CEST (UTC+2)	Stojkov 23'	Report	Stahel 51'	Stadium: Stadion Brügglifeld; Referee: Bruno Grossen

12 September 2009 9	Zürich	4–3	Grasshopper	Zürich
17:45 CEST (UTC+2)	Alphonse 14'; Hassli (yellow card) 40'; Aegerter 41'; Vonlanthen 69'; Margairaz 71'	Report	Zárate 7', 81'; Schultz (yellow card) 16'; Smiljanić (yellow card) 40'; Ben Khalifa 74'	Stadium: Letzigrund; Referee: Cyril Zimmermann

23 September 2009 10	Young Boys	3–0	Zürich	Bern
20:15 CEST (UTC+2)	Schneuwly 17' (pen.); Doumbia 48'; Degen 55'	Report		Stadium: Stadion Wankdorf; Referee: Sascha Kever

27 September 2009 11	Zürich	1–2	Neuchâtel Xamax	Zürich
16:00 CEST (UTC+2)	Vonlanthen 58'	Report	Niasse 8'; Ideye 64'	Stadium: Letzigrund; Referee: Nikolaj Hänni

4 October 2009 12	Bellinzona	3–2	Zürich	Bellinzona
16:00 CEST (UTC+2)	Sermeter 42'; Gashi 59'; Lustrinelli 89' (pen.)	Report	Vonlanthen 38'; Schönbächler 90'	Stadium: Stadio Comunale Bellinzona; Referee: Cyril Zimmermann

25 October 2009 13	St. Gallen	1–3	Zürich	St. Gallen
16:00 CEST (UTC+2)	Abegglen 33'	Report	Djuric 50'; Margairaz 68'; Vonlanthen 79'	Stadium: AFG Arena; Referee: Claudio Circhetta

28 October 2009 14	Zürich	2–2	Basel	Zürich
19:45 CEST (UTC+2)	Okonkwo 53'; Gajić 86'	Report	Huggel 61'; Stocker 63'	Stadium: Letzigrund; Referee: Carlo Bertolini

31 October 2009 15	Zürich	1–1	Sion	Zürich
17:45 CEST (UTC+2)	Alphonse 67'	Report	Chihab 3'	Stadium: Letzigrund; Referee: Sascha Kever

8 November 2009 16	Luzern	1–0	Zürich	Luzern
16:00 CEST (UTC+2)	J. Frimpong 58'	Report		Stadium: Stadion Gersag; Referee: Bruno Grossen

29 November 2009 17	Zürich	2–0	Aarau	Zürich
16:00 CEST (UTC+2)	Djuric 29'; Alphonse 54'	Report		Stadium: Letzigrund; Referee: Patrick Graf

5 December 2009 18	Grasshopper	1–0	Zürich	Zürich
17:45 CEST (UTC+2)	Schultz (yellow card) 34'; Callà (yellow card) 38'; Vallori (yellow card) 50'; Cabanas 55'	Report	Okonkwo (yellow card) 37'; Alphonse (yellow card) 41'	Stadium: Letzigrund; Referee: Claudio Circhetta

6 February 2010 19	Zürich	0–0	Neuchâtel Xamax	Zürich
17:45 CEST (UTC+2)		Report		Stadium: Letzigrund; Referee: Sascha Kever

14 February 2010 20	Sion	1–1	Zürich	Sion
16:00 CEST (UTC+2)	Vanczák 78'	Report	Gajić 88' (pen.)	Stadium: Stade Tourbillon; Referee: Massimo Busacca

27 February 2010 22	Young Boys	2–1	Zürich	Bern
17:45 CEST (UTC+2)	Regazzoni 83'; Ntsama 90'	Report	Gajić 23'	Stadium: Stadion Wankdorf; Referee: Stephan Studer

7 March 2010 23	Zürich	1–0	Luzern	Zürich
16:00 CEST (UTC+2)	Djuric 42'	Report		Stadium: Letzigrund; Referee: Claudio Circhetta

13 March 2010 24	Aarau	1–3	Zürich	Aarau
17:45 CEST (UTC+2)	Stojkov 11'	Report	Benito 34' (o.g.); Alphonse 47'; Vonlanthen 67'	Stadium: Stadion Brügglifeld; Referee: Bruno Grossen

21 March 2010 25	Zürich	2–0	Bellinzona	Zürich
16:00 CEST (UTC+2)	Alphonse 35'; Djuric 67'	Report		Stadium: Letzigrund; Referee: Jérôme Laperrière

24 March 2010 26	Basel	4–1	Zürich	Basel
19:45 CEST (UTC+2)	Streller 14', 58' (pen.); Chipperfield 16'; Zoua 77'	Report	Alphonse 45'	Stadium: St. Jakob-Park; Referee: Massimo Busacca

27 March 2010 27	St. Gallen	1–0	Zürich	St. Gallen
17:45 CEST (UTC+2)	Merenda 84'	Report		Stadium: AFG Arena; Referee: Daniel Wermelinger

1 April 2010 28	Zürich	1–1	St. Gallen	Zürich
19:45 CEST (UTC+2)	Vonlanthen 6'	Report	Merenda 26'	Stadium: Letzigrund; Referee: Stephan Studer

5 April 2010 21	Zürich	3–2	Grasshopper	Zürich
16:00 CEST (UTC+2)	Margairaz 20' (pen.), (yellow card) 23'; Buff (yellow card) 25', (goal) 52'; Alphonse (yellow card) 81'; Mehmedi 90'	Report	Toko (yellow card) 2'; Zuber 17'; Smiljanić (yellow card) 19'; Cabanas 24', (yellow card) 67'; Salatić (yellow card) 56'; Paulinho (yellow card) 61'	Stadium: Letzigrund; Referee: Claudio Circhetta

11 April 2010 29	Zürich	1–2	Basel	Zürich
16:00 CEST (UTC+2)	Margairaz (yellow card) 6', (goal) 53'	Report	Shaqiri 75'; Almerares 78'	Stadium: Letzigrund; Referee: Massimo Busacca

14 April 2010 30	Bellinzona	1–4	Zürich	Bellinzona
19:45 CEST (UTC+2)	Hima 90'	Report	Aegerter 9'; Djuric 65'; Alphonse 67'; Vonlanthen 82'	Stadium: Stadio Comunale Bellinzona; Referee: Nikolaj Hänni

17 April 2010 31	Zürich	0–1	Aarau	Zürich
17:45 CEST (UTC+2)		Report	Mustafi 62'	Stadium: Letzigrund; Referee: Patrick Graf

24 April 2010 32	Luzern	4–1	Zürich	Luzern
17:45 CEST (UTC+2)	Renggli 4'; Ianu 15'; Yakin 36'; Chiumiento 85'	Report	Djuric 5'	Stadium: Stadion Gersag; Referee: Jérôme Laperrière

2 May 2010 33	Zürich	0–2	Young Boys	Zürich
16:00 CEST (UTC+2)		Report	Ntsama 63'; Hochstrasser 72'	Stadium: Letzigrund; Referee: Massimo Busacca

6 May 2010 34	Grasshopper	4–0	Zürich	Zürich
19:45 CEST (UTC+2)	Ben Khalifa 7'; Voser (yellow card) 44'; Cabanas 49', (yellow card) 90'; Steuble 72'; Šabanović 86'	Report	Buff (yellow card) 52'; Margairaz (yellow card) 88'; Okonkwo (yellow card) 90'	Stadium: Letzigrund; Referee: Carlo Bertolini

13 May 2010 35	Zürich	2–0	Sion	Zürich
20:15 CEST (UTC+2)	Mehmedi 6'; Schönbächler 57'	Report		Stadium: Letzigrund; Referee: Patrick Graf

16 May 2010 36	Neuchâtel Xamax	3–3	Zürich	Neuchâtel
16:00 CEST (UTC+2)	Nuzzolo 59'; Etoundi 73'; Gashi 84'	Report	Margairaz 7'; Schönbächler 42'; Mehmedi 61'	Stadium: Stade de la Maladière; Referee: Nikolaj Hänni

=== Swiss Cup ===
19 September 2009 First round	Witikon	0–10	Zürich	Zürich
15:30 CEST (UTC+2)		Report		Stadium: Sportanlage Katzenschwanzstrasse Witikon

17 October 2009 Second round	Locarno	0–7	Zürich	Locarno
17:45 CEST (UTC+2)		Report		Stadium: Stadio del Lido

20 November 2009 Third round	Basel	4–2	Zürich	Basel
20:10 CEST (UTC+2)	Stocker 16'; Frei 54', 58'; Streller 76'	Report	Djuric 31'; Alphonse 90'	Stadium: St. Jakob-Park; Referee: Jérôme Laperrière

=== UEFA Champions League ===
==== Third qualifying round ====
29 July 2009 First leg	Zürich (Switzerland)	2–3	(Slovenia) Maribor	Zürich, Switzerland
20:15 CEST (UTC+2)	Vonlanthen 4'; Hassli 29'; Gajić (yellow card) 82'; Aegerter (yellow card) 86'	Report	Tavares 12', 22'; Mertelj (yellow card) 23'; Pavlović 50', (penalty missed) 82'; Mejač (yellow card) 67'	Stadium: Letzigrund; Attendance: 8,500; Referee: Eric Braamhaar (Netherlands)

5 August 2009 Second leg	Maribor (Slovenia)	0–3 (3–5 agg.)	(Switzerland) Zürich	Maribor, Slovenia
20:15 CEST (UTC+2)	Bačinović (yellow card) 67'	Report	Djuric 21'; Margairaz 45'; Nikçi 76'; Gajić (yellow card) 86'	Stadium: Ljudski vrt Attendance: 12,000; Referee: Laurent Duhamel (France)
Note: Zürich won 5–3 on aggregate.

==== Play-off round ====
19 August 2009 First leg	Ventspils (Latvia)	0–3	(Switzerland) Zürich	Riga, Latvia (Note: The match was played at the Skonto Stadium in Riga, instead of Ventspils regular stadium, the Ventspils Olimpiskais Stadions in Ventspils, which did not meet UEFA requirements.)
21:45 EEST (UTC+3)	Astafjevs (yellow card) 26'; Cilinšek (yellow card) 90+2'	Report	Vonlanthen 12'; Aegerter 55'; Djuric 75'	Stadium: Skonto Stadium; Attendance: 7,300; Referee: Tom Henning Øvrebø (Norway)

25 August 2009 Second leg	Zürich (Switzerland)	2–1 (5–1 agg.)	(Latvia) Ventspils	St. Gallen, Switzerland (Note: Played in St. Gallen at AFG Arena as Zürich's Letzigrund hosted IAAF Golden League's fourth part (Weltklasse Zürich) on 28 August 2009.)
20:45 CEST (UTC+2)	Vonlanthen 6'; Abdi 90+2'	Report	Țîgîrlaș 8'; Baymatov (yellow card) 51'	Stadium: AFG Arena; Attendance: 9,050; Referee: Terje Hauge (Norway)
Note: Zürich won 5–1 on aggregate.

==== Group stage ====
Pos	Team	Pld	W	D	L	GF	GA	GD	Pts	Qualification	RMA	MIL	MAR	ZUR
1	(Spain) Real Madrid	6	4	1	1	15	7	+8	13	Advance to knockout phase	—	2–3	3–0	1–0
2	(Italy) Milan	6	2	3	1	8	7	+1	9	Advance to knockout phase	1–1	—	1–1	0–1
3	(France) Marseille	6	2	1	3	10	10	0	7	Transfer to Europa League	1–3	1–2	—	6–1
4	(Switzerland) Zürich	6	1	1	4	5	14	−9	4		2–5	1–1	0–1	—

Source: RSSSF

15 September 2009 1	Zürich (Switzerland)	2–5	(Spain) Real Madrid	Zürich, Switzerland
20:45 CEST (UTC+2)	Stahel (yellow card) 24'; Okonkwo (yellow card) 50'; Margairaz 64' (pen.); Aegerter 65'	Report	Kaká (yellow card) 16'; Drenthe (yellow card) 24'; Ronaldo 27', 89'; Raúl 34'; Higuaín 45+1'; Casillas (yellow card) 63'; Gago (yellow card) 68'; Guti (yellow card) 74', (goal) 90+4'; L. Diarra (yellow card) 81'	Stadium: Letzigrund; Attendance: 15,000; Referee: Martin Atkinson (England)

30 September 2009 2	Milan (Italy)	0–1	(Switzerland) Zürich	Milan, Italy
20:45 CEST (UTC+2)	Kaladze (yellow card) 35'; Abate (yellow card) 51'; Jankulovski (yellow card) 80'	Report	Tihinen 10'; Leoni (yellow card) 50'; Okonkwo (yellow card) 51'; Margairaz (yellow card) 90+5'	Stadium: San Siro; Attendance: 32,439; Referee: Florian Meyer (Germany)

21 October 2009 3	Zürich (Switzerland)	0–1	(France) Marseille	Zürich, Switzerland
20:45 CEST (UTC+2)	Margairaz (yellow card) 61'; Aegerter (yellow card) 63'	Report	Bonnart (yellow card) 68'; Heinze 69'; Brandão (yellow card) 78'	Stadium: Letzigrund; Attendance: 22,300; Referee: Damir Skomina (Slovenia)

3 November 2009 4	Marseille (France)	6–1	(Switzerland) Zürich	Marseille, France
20:45 CET (UTC+1)	Aegerter 3' (o.g.); Abriel 11'; Brandão (yellow card) 20', (goal) 90'; Niang 51'; Mbia (yellow card) 66'; Cheyrou (yellow card) 67', (goal) 87'; Hilton 80'	Report	Alphonse 31'; Okonkwo (yellow card) 48'; Tihinen (yellow card) 66'; Stahel (yellow card) 79'	Stadium: Stade Vélodrome; Attendance: 56,282; Referee: Craig Thomson (Scotland)

25 November 2009 5	Real Madrid (Spain)	1–0	(Switzerland) Zürich	Madrid, Spain
20:45 CET (UTC+1)	Higuaín 21'; L. Diarra (yellow card) 61'; Alonso (yellow card) 83'	Report	Barmettler (yellow card) 56'; Djurić (yellow card) 63'; Stahel (yellow card) 65'	Stadium: Santiago Bernabéu Stadium; Attendance: 67,867; Referee: Alain Hamer (Luxembourg)

8 December 2009 6	Zürich (Switzerland)	1–1	(Italy) Milan	Zürich, Switzerland
20:45 CET (UTC+1)	Gajić 29'; Barmettler (yellow card) 43'; Rochat (red card) 63'	Report	Ronaldinho 64' (pen.); Abate (yellow card) 77'; Seedorf (yellow card) 86'	Stadium: Letzigrund; Attendance: 24,100; Referee: Pedro Proença (Portugal)
