= 2009–10 in Swiss football =

Football in Switzerland
- Season: 2009–10

Men's football
- Super League: Basel
- Challenge League: Thun
- 1. Liga: Group 1: Sion U-21
- 1. Liga: Group 2: YF Juventus
- 1. Liga: Group 3: Chiasso
- Swiss Cup: Basel

Women's football
- Swiss Women's Super League: FC Zürich Frauen

The following is a summary of the 2009–10 season of competitive football in Switzerland.

== Super League ==
=== Final league table ===
Pos	Team	Pld	W	D	L	GF	GA	GD	Pts	Qualification or relegation
1	Basel (C)	36	25	5	6	90	46	+44	80	Swiss champions and Swiss Cup winners Qualification to Champions League third qualifying round
2	Young Boys	36	25	2	9	78	47	+31	77	Qualification to Champions League third qualifying round
3	Grasshopper	36	21	2	13	65	43	+22	65	Qualification to Europa League play-off round (Note: Basel, who have already qualified for the 2010–11 UEFA Champions League, played Challenge League side Lausanne-Sport in the 2009–10 Swiss Cup final. Basel have won the cup, thus 3rd-placed team will qualify for the play-off round and the 4th-placed team will be inserted into the third qualifying round of the UEFA Europa League and Lausanne-Sport will be inserted into the 2010–11 UEFA Europa League 2nd qualifying round.)
4	Luzern	36	17	7	12	66	55	+11	58	Qualification to Europa League third qualifying round
5	Sion	36	14	9	13	63	57	+6	51	
6	St. Gallen	36	13	7	16	53	56	−3	46	
7	Zürich	36	12	9	15	55	58	−3	45	
8	Neuchâtel Xamax	36	11	8	17	55	57	−2	41	
9	Bellinzona (O)	36	7	4	25	42	92	−50	25	Advance to relegation play-offs
10	Aarau (R)	36	6	5	25	32	88	−56	23	Relegation to Swiss Challenge League

Source: rsssf
Rules for classification: 1) points; 2) goal difference; 3) number of goals scored.
(C) Champions; (O) Play-off winners; (R) Relegated

== Challenge League ==
=== Final league table ===
Pos	Team	Pld	W	D	L	GF	GA	GD	Pts	Promotion or relegation
1	Thun (C, P)	30	18	6	6	70	36	+34	60	Promotion to 2010–11 Swiss Super League
2	Lugano	30	17	8	5	65	29	+36	59	Qualification for Promotion play-off
3	Winterthur	30	16	8	6	69	46	+23	56	
4	Servette	30	14	10	6	49	37	+12	52	
5	Kriens	30	12	10	8	50	41	+9	46	
6	Wil	30	11	12	7	44	37	+7	45	
7	Biel-Bienne	30	10	12	8	54	39	+15	42	
8	Vaduz	30	11	8	11	44	43	+1	41	Qualification for Europa League second qualifying round (Note: Vaduz qualified for the 2010–11 UEFA Europa League 2nd qualifying round as they won the 2009–10 Liechtenstein Cup)
9	Yverdon-Sport	30	10	9	11	50	38	+12	39	
10	Lausanne-Sport	30	9	12	9	40	43	−3	39	Qualification for Europa League second qualifying round (Note: Lausanne-Sport have qualified for the 2010–11 UEFA Europa League 2nd qualifying round as they lost the 2009–10 Swiss Cup final against Champions League-qualified Basel.)
11	Schaffhausen	30	10	9	11	42	51	−9	39	
12	Wohlen	30	8	7	15	44	55	−11	31	
13	Locarno	30	7	10	13	46	65	−19	31	
14	Stade Nyonnais	30	8	7	15	36	64	−28	31	
15	Le Mont (R)	30	8	3	19	30	56	−26	27	Relegation to 2010–11 Swiss 1. Liga
16	Gossau (R)	30	2	7	21	27	80	−53	13	Relegation to 2010–11 Swiss 1. Liga

Source: football.ch (in German)
Rules for classification: 1) points; 2) goal difference; 3) number of goals scored.
(C) Champions; (P) Promoted; (R) Relegated

=== Promotion/relegation play-offs ===
AC Bellinzona as 9th-placed team of the 2009–10 Super League played a two-legged play-off against Challenge League runners-up AC Lugano for a spot in the 2010–11 Super League.

21 May 2010
20:15 CEST

Bellinzona	2–1	Lugano
Mihoubi 27'; Feltscher 90+1'	Report (in Italian)	Montandon 70'; Preisig (red card) 78'

Stadio Comunale Bellinzona, Bellinzona
Attendance: 5,400
Referee: Jérôme Laperrière

24 May 2010
16:00 CEST

Lugano	0–0	Bellinzona
	Report (in Italian)

Cornaredo Stadium, Lugano
Attendance: 6,500
Referee: Claudio Circhetta

Bellinzona won 2–1 on aggregate and remain in the Swiss Super League. Lugano remain in the Swiss Challenge League.

== 1. Liga ==
=== Group 1 ===
Pos	Team	Pld	W	D	L	GF	GA	GD	Pts	Qualification or relegation
1	Sion U-21	30	16	6	8	66	50	+16	54	Not eligible to Play-off
2	ES FC Malley	30	15	8	7	65	45	+20	53	Play-off to Challenge League
3	CS Chênois	30	13	9	8	46	40	+6	48	
4	SC Düdingen	30	13	8	9	62	49	+13	47	
5	Étoile Carouge FC	30	13	7	10	60	54	+6	46	Play-off to Challenge League
6	FC Martigny-Sports	30	14	4	12	46	46	0	46	
7	FC Meyrin	30	11	12	7	64	51	+13	45	
8	FC Fribourg	30	12	8	10	54	46	+8	44	
9	FC Echallens	30	12	8	10	59	52	+7	44	
10	FC Naters	30	10	7	13	53	61	−8	37	
11	FC Baulmes	30	10	6	14	53	76	−23	36	
12	Young Boys U-21	30	10	4	16	48	58	−10	34	
13	Urania Genève Sport	30	8	10	12	49	62	−13	34	
14	Grand-Lancy FC	30	10	4	16	43	62	−19	34	
15	FC Bavois	30	9	5	16	43	55	−12	32	Relegation to 2. Liga Interregional
16	FC Bulle	30	6	10	14	46	50	−4	28	Relegation to 2. Liga Interregional

Source: Erste Liga official website
Rules for classification: 1) Points; 2) Play-off.

=== Group 2 ===
Pos	Team	Pld	W	D	L	GF	GA	GD	Pts	Qualification or relegation
1	YF Juventus	30	16	10	4	52	33	+19	58	Play-off to Challenge League
2	Basel U-21	30	17	6	7	76	46	+30	57	Not eligible to Play-off
3	Zürich U-21	30	17	6	7	70	40	+30	57	Not eligible to Play-off
4	SR Delémont	30	17	6	7	61	45	+16	57	Play-off to Challenge League
5	FC Münsingen	30	13	7	10	49	39	+10	46	Play-off to Challenge League
6	Grasshopper Club U-21	30	12	9	9	64	55	+9	45	
7	FC Grenchen	30	11	9	10	42	41	+1	42	
8	FC Breitenrain Bern	30	10	10	10	53	43	+10	40	
9	FC Laufen	30	9	7	14	49	59	−10	34	
10	BSC Old Boys	30	8	10	12	40	51	−11	34	
11	FC Solothurn	30	7	12	11	34	45	−11	33	
12	FC Wangen bei Olten	30	9	6	15	48	61	−13	33	
13	SV Muttenz	30	7	10	13	39	47	−8	31	
14	Winterthur U-21	30	8	7	15	44	73	−29	31	
15	FC Schaffhausen	30	7	9	14	38	64	−26	30	Relegation to 2. Liga Interregional
16	SV Höngg	30	7	6	17	49	66	−17	27	Relegation to 2. Liga Interregional

Source: Erste Liga official website
Rules for classification: 1) Points; 2) Play-off

=== Group 3 ===
Pos	Team	Pld	W	D	L	GF	GA	GD	Pts	Qualification or relegation
1	FC Chiasso	30	19	7	4	63	26	+37	64	Play-off to Challenge League
2	FC Rapperswil-Jona	30	18	7	5	69	44	+25	61	Play-off to Challenge League
3	FC Tuggen	30	16	3	11	69	48	+21	51	Play-off to Challenge League
4	FC Baden	30	14	7	9	59	34	+25	49	
5	Luzern U-21	30	13	7	10	44	43	+1	46	
6	Zug 94	30	13	5	12	48	55	−7	44	
7	FC Mendrisio	30	12	6	12	34	38	−4	42	
8	GC Biaschesi	30	13	2	15	45	53	−8	41	
9	USV Eschen/Mauren	30	11	7	12	53	57	−4	40	
10	St. Gallen U-21	30	11	5	14	48	59	−11	38	
11	SC Zofingen	30	10	7	13	53	56	−3	37	
12	Lugano U-21	30	10	6	14	44	54	−10	36	
13	FC Schötz	30	9	7	14	43	54	−11	34	
14	SC Cham	30	9	6	15	35	43	−8	33	Play-off against relegation
15	FC Emmenbrücke	30	9	6	15	43	54	−11	33	Play-off against relegation
16	FC Chur 97	30	8	2	20	32	64	−32	26	Relegation to 2. Liga Interregional

Rules for classification: 1) Points; 2) Play-off

=== Play-off against relegation ===
SC Cham	3–0	FC Emmenbrücke
Goal

Sportplatz Wissenhusen, Schötz

FC Emmenbrücke is relegated to the 2. Liga Interregional.

=== Promotion play-offs ===
==== Qualifying Round ====
29 May 2011

Tuggen	0–4	YF Juventus
		Goal

Linthstrasse, Tuggen

2 June 2011

YF Juventus	3–2	Tuggen
Goal		Goal

Utogrund, Zürich

YF Juventus win 7–2 on aggregate

30 May 2011

Étoile Carouge	1–3	Rapperswil-Jona
Goal		Goal

Stade de la Fontenette, Carouge

2 June 2011

Rapperswil-Jona	5–1	Étoile Carouge
Goal		Goal

Stadion Grünfeld, Rapperswil

Rapperswil-Jona win 8–2 on aggregate

30 May 2011

Delémont	2–0	ES FC Malley
Goal

La Blancherie, Delémont

2 June 2011

ES FC Malley	2–3	Delémont
Goal		Goal

Centre Sportif de la Tuilière, Lausanne

Delémont win 5–2 on aggregate

30 May 2011

Münsingen	0–1	Chiasso
		Goal

Sportanlage Sandreutenen, Münsingen

2 June 2011

Chiasso	2–1	Münsingen
Goal		Goal

Stadio Comunale Riva IV

Chiasso win 3–1 on aggregate

==== Final round ====
5 June 2011

YF Juventus	2–1	Delémont
Goal		Goal

Utogrund, Zürich

9 June 2011

Delémont	4–1	YF Juventus
Goal		Goal

La Blancherie, Delémont

Delémont win 5–3 on aggregate and achieve peomotion

5 June 2011

Chiasso	1–0	Rapperswil-Jona
Goal

Stadio Comunale Riva IV

9 June 2011

Rapperswil-Jona	0–2	Chiasso
		Goal

Stadion Grünfeld, Rapperswil

Chiasso win 3–0 on aggregate and achieve peomotion

== Swiss Cup ==
=== Semi-finals ===
The winners in the quarter-finals played in this round. FC St. Gallen had beaten FC Luzern 4–1, FC Lausanne-Sport had also beaten Young Boys 4–1, SC Kriens won 2–1 against FC Thun and Basel had been 3–1 winners against Biel-Bienne.

5 April 2010
14:00 CEST

FC St. Gallen	1 – 2	FC Lausanne-Sport
Zé Vitor 22'; Zé Vitor (yellow card) 89'	SFV report	Favre (yellow card) 28'; Katz 40'; Katz (yellow card) 49' (yellow-red card) 63'; Gaspar 79'

AFG Arena, St. Gallen
Attendance: 17,197
Referee: Massimo Busacca

5 April 2010
13:30 CEST

SC Kriens	0–1	Basel
Fanger (yellow card) 19'; Ferricchio (yellow card) 43'; Imholz (yellow card) 55'; Pacar (yellow card) 90+2'	FCB summary	17' (0:1) Almerares; (yellow card) 64' Abraham; (yellow card) 88' Carlitos; (yellow card) 90+1' Shaqiri

Stadion Kleinfeld, Kriens
Attendance: 5,000
Referee: (Switzerland) Daniel Wermelinger

=== Final ===
9 May 2010
16:30 CEST

Basel	6–0	FC Lausanne-Sport
Stocker 28' (1:0); Shaqiri 30' (2:0); Zoua 46' (3:0); Chipperfield 52' (4:0); Stocker 75' (5:0); Huggel 89' (6:0)	FCB summary

St. Jakob-Park, Basel
Attendance: 30,100
Referee: (Switzerland) Sascha Kever

Note: Fair game, no yellow cards

== Swiss Clubs in Europe ==
- Zürich as league champions: Champions League third qualifying round
- Young Boys as runners-up: Europa League third qualifying round
- Basel as third placed team: Europa League second qualifying round
- Sion as 2008–09 Swiss Cup winners: Europa League play-off round
- Vaduz as 2008–09 Liechtenstein Cup winners: Europa League second qualifying round

=== Zürich ===
==== Champions League ====
===== Third qualifying round =====
29 July 2009 First leg	Zürich (Switzerland)	2–3	(Slovenia) Maribor	Letzigrund, Zürich
20:15	Vonlanthen 4'; Hassli 29'	Report	Tavares 12', 22'; Pavlović 50'	Attendance: 8,500; Referee: Eric Braamhaar (Netherlands)

5 August 2009 Second leg	Maribor (Slovenia)	0–3	(Switzerland) Zürich	Ljudski vrt, Maribor
20:15		Report	Djuric 21'; Margairaz 45'; Nikçi 76'	Attendance: 12,000; Referee: Laurent Duhamel (France)

Zürich won 5–3 on aggregate.

===== Play-off round =====
19 August 2009 First leg	Ventspils (Latvia)	0–3	(Switzerland) Zürich	Skonto Stadium, Riga
20:45		Report	Vonlanthen 12'; Aegerter 55'; Djuric 75'	Attendance: 7,300; Referee: Tom Henning Øvrebø (Norway)
Note: Played in Riga at Skonto Stadium as Ventspils' Ventspils Olimpiskais Stadions did not meet UEFA criteria.

25 August 2009 Second leg	Zürich (Switzerland)	2–1	(Latvia) Ventspils	AFG Arena, St. Gallen
20:45	Vonlanthen 6'; Abdi 90+2'	Report	Țîgîrlaș 8'	Attendance: 9,050; Referee: Terje Hauge (Norway)
Note: Played in St. Gallen at AFG Arena as Zürich's Letzigrund hosted IAAF Golden League's fourth part (Weltklasse Zürich) on 28 August 2009.

Zürich won 5–1 on aggregate.

===== Group stage / group C =====
15 September 2009 Matchday 1	Zürich (Switzerland)	2–5	(Spain) Real Madrid	Letzigrund, Zürich
20:45 (20:45 UTC+2)	Margairaz 64' (pen.); Aegerter 65'	Report	Ronaldo 27', 89'; Raúl 34'; Higuaín 45+1'; Guti 90+4'	Attendance: 24,424; Referee: Martin Atkinson (England)

30 September 2009 Matchday 2	Milan (Italy)	0–1	(Switzerland) Zürich	San Siro, Milan
20:45		Report	Tihinen 10'	Attendance: 32,439; Referee: Florian Meyer (Germany)

21 October 2009 Matchday 3	Zürich (Switzerland)	0–1	(France) Marseille	Letzigrund, Zürich
20:45 (20:45 UTC+2)		Report	Heinze 69'	Attendance: 22,300; Referee: Damir Skomina (Slovenia)

3 November 2009 Matchday 4	Marseille (France)	6–1	(Switzerland) Zürich	Stade Vélodrome, Marseille
20:45 (20:45 UTC+1)	Aegerter 3' (o.g.); Abriel 11'; Niang 51'; Hilton 80'; Cheyrou 87'; Brandão 90'	Report	Alphonse 31'	Attendance: 56,282; Referee: Craig Thomson (Scotland)

25 November 2009 Matchday 5	Real Madrid (Spain)	1–0	(Switzerland) Zürich	Santiago Bernabéu, Madrid
20:45 (20:45 UTC+1)	Higuaín 21'	Report		Attendance: 67,867; Referee: Alain Hamer (Luxembourg)

8 December 2009 Matchday 6	Zürich (Switzerland)	1–1	(Italy) Milan	Letzigrund, Zürich
20:45 (20:45 UTC+1)	Gajić 29'	Report	Ronaldinho 64' (pen.)	Attendance: 24,100; Referee: Pedro Proença (Portugal)

Pos	Team	Pld	W	D	L	GF	GA	GD	Pts	Qualification	RM	MIL	OM	ZÜR
1	(Spain) Real Madrid	6	4	1	1	15	7	+8	13	Advance to knockout phase	—	2–3	3–0	1–0
2	(Italy) Milan	6	2	3	1	8	7	+1	9	Advance to knockout phase	1–1	—	1–1	0–1
3	(France) Marseille	6	2	1	3	10	10	0	7	Transfer to Europa League	1–3	1–2	—	6–1
4	(Switzerland) Zürich	6	1	1	4	5	14	−9	4		2–5	1–1	0–1	—

Source: RSSSF

=== Young Boys ===
==== Europa League ====
===== Third qualifying round =====
30 July 2009 First leg	Athletic Bilbao (Spain)	0–1	(Switzerland) Young Boys	San Mamés, Bilbao
21:30		Report	Doumbia 23'	Attendance: 19,104; Referee: Costas Kapitanis (Cyprus)

6 August 2009 Second leg	Young Boys (Switzerland)	1–2	(Spain) Athletic Bilbao	Stade de Suisse, Bern
19:30	Frimpong 90+2'	Report	Llorente 26'; Muniain 72'	Attendance: 21,277; Referee: Alon Yefet (Israel)

Young Boys 2–2 Athletic Bilbao on aggregate. Athletic Bilbao won on away goals.

=== Basel ===
==== Europa League ====
===== Second qualifying round =====
16 July 2009 First leg	Basel (Switzerland)	3–0	(Andorra) Santa Coloma	St. Jakob-Park, Basel
19:30	Şahin 23'; Streller 48' (2:0); Almerares 59' (3:0)	UEFA summary FCB summary	(yellow card) 40' Sergio Albanell; (yellow card) 84' dos Santos; (yellow card) 90+2' Sánchez	Attendance: 25,038; Referee: (Wales) Ceri Richards (FAW)

23 July 2009 Second leg	Santa Coloma (Andorra)	1–4	(Switzerland) Basel	Estadi Comunal d'Aixovall, Andorra la Vella
19:00	(yellow card) 36' dos Santos 42' (pen. 1:3)	UEFA summary FCB summary	12' (0:1) Streller; 15' (0:2) Gelabert; (yellow card) 37' Huggel; 40' (o.g. 0:3) Alvarez; (yellow card) 43' Şahin; (yellow card) 52' Gelabert; (yellow card) 86' Safari; 88' (1:4) Almerares	Attendance: 400; Referee: (Bosnia and Herzegovina) Rusmir Mrkovic (FSBiH)

Basel won 7–1 on aggregate.

===== Third qualifying round =====
30 July 2009 First leg	Knattspyrnufélag Reykjavíkur (Iceland)	2–2	(Switzerland) Basel	KR-völlur, Reykjavík
21:15	Benediktsson 6' (1:0); G. Sigurðarson 9' (2:0)	UEFA summary FCB summary	58' (2:1) Chipperfield; 83' (2:2) Almerares	Attendance: 1,500; Referee: (Spain) Fernando Teixeira Vitienes (RFEF)

6 August 2009 Second leg	Basel (Switzerland)	3–1	(Iceland) Knattspyrnufélag Reykjavíkur	St. Jakob-Park, Basel
19:30	Frei 29' (1:0); Shaqiri 77' (2:1); Frei 80' (pen. 3:1)	UEFA summary FCB summary	45+1' (pen. 1:1) Takefusa	Attendance: 13,117; Referee: (Finland) Tony Asumaa (FAF)

Basel won 5–3 on aggregate.

===== Play-off round =====
20 August 2009 First leg	Baku (Azerbaijan)	1–3	(Switzerland) Basel	Tofik Bakhramov Stadium, Baku
17:00	Skulic (yellow card) 3'; Pérez 49' (1:0)	UEFA summary FCB summary	(yellow card) 45' Şahin; (yellow card) 51' Inkoom; 71' (1:1) Streller; 74' (1:2) Streller; 77' (1:3) Huggel	Attendance: 13,000; Referee: Zsolt Szabo (Hungary)
Note: Played in Baku at Tofik Bakhramov Stadium as Karabakh's Guzanli Olympic Stadium did not meet UEFA criteria.

27 August 2009 Second first leg	Basel (Switzerland)	5–1	(Azerbaijan) Baku	St. Jakob-Park, Basel
19:30	Gelabert (yellow card) 7'; Almerares 32' (1:0); Gelabert 36' (2:1) da Silva (yellow card) 61'; Frei 63' (3:1); Huggel (yellow card) 69'; Shaqiri 74' (4:2); Mustafi 84' (5:1); Mustafi (yellow card) 85'; Shaqiri (yellow card) 90'	UEFA summary FCB summary	33' (1:1) Felipe; (yellow card) 85' Fabio Ramim; (yellow card) 85' Jaba	Attendance: 7,113; Referee: Hannes Kaasik (Estonia)

Basel won 8–2 on aggregate.

===== Group stage, group E =====
17 September 2009 Matchday 1	Basel (Switzerland)	2–0	(Italy) Roma	St. Jakob-Park, Basel
19:00	Carlitos 11' (1:0); Cabral (yellow card) 33'; Costanzo (yellow card) 50'; Abraham (yellow card) 64'; Çağdaş (yellow card) 73'; Almerares 87' (2:0); Almerares (yellow card) 88'	UEFA summary FCB summary	(yellow card) 45' Ménez; (yellow card) 78' Pizarro	Attendance: 16,459; Referee: (Spain) Carlos Velasco Carballo (RFEF)

1 October 2009 Matchday 2	Fulham (England)	1–0	(Switzerland) Basel	Craven Cottage, London
21:05	Murphy 57' (1:0); Greening (yellow card) 63'; Baird (yellow card) 85'	UEFA summary FCB summary		Attendance: 16,100; Referee: (Germany) Michael Weiner (DFB)

22 October 2009 Matchday 3	CSKA Sofia (Bulgaria)	0–2	(Switzerland) Basel	Vasil Levski National Stadium, Sofia
21:05	Todorov (yellow card) 67'; Branekov (yellow card) 70'	UEFA summary FCB summary	20' (0:1) Frei; (yellow card) 34' Safari; 63' (0:2) Frei	Attendance: 17,000; Referee: (Portugal) Manuel De Sousa (FPF)
Note: CSKA Sofia played their home group matches at Vasil Levski National Stadium as their Balgarska Armiya Stadium did not meet UEFA criteria.

5 November 2009 Matchday 4	Basel (Switzerland)	3–1	(Bulgaria) CSKA Sofia	St. Jakob-Park, Basel
19:00	Gelabert 35' (1:0); Frei 41' (pen. 2:0); Frei 67' (3:1)	UEFA summary FCB summary	(yellow card) 15' K. Stoyanov; (yellow card) 19' Morozs; 61' (2:1) Yanchev	Attendance: 15,255; Referee: (Ukraine) Oleg Oriekhov (FFU)

3 December 2009 Matchday 5	Roma (Italy)	2–1	(Switzerland) Basel	Stadio Olimpico, Rome
21:05	Totti 32' (pen. 1:1); Ménez (yellow card) 44'; De Rossi (yellow card) 52'; Vučinić 59' (2:1); Juan (yellow card) 90+2'	UEFA summary FCB summary	18' (0:1) Huggel; (yellow card) 31' Gelabert; (yellow card) 75' Carlitos	Attendance: 27,000; Referee: (France) Tony Chapron (FFF)

16 December 2009 Matchday 6	Basel (Switzerland)	2–3	(England) Fulham	St. Jakob-Park, Basel
19:00	Abraham (yellow card) 40'; Frei (yellow card) 45'; Frei 64' (pen. 1:2); Streller 87' (2:3)	UEFA summary FCB summary	(yellow card) 30' Zamora; 41' (0:1) Zamora; 45' (0:2) Zamora; (yellow card) 51' Greening; 77' (1:3) Gera	Attendance: 20,063; Referee: (Sweden) Stefan Johannesson (SvFF)

Pos	Team	Pld	W	D	L	GF	GA	GD	Pts	Qualification
1	(Italy) Roma	6	4	1	1	10	5	+5	13	Advance to knockout phase
2	(England) Fulham	6	3	2	1	8	6	+2	11	Advance to knockout phase
3	(Switzerland) Basel	6	3	0	3	10	7	+3	9	
4	(Bulgaria) CSKA Sofia	6	0	1	5	2	12	−10	1	

Source: Soccerway

=== Sion ===
==== Europa League ====
===== Play-off round =====
20 August 2009 First leg	Sion (Switzerland)	0–2	(Turkey) Fenerbahçe	Stade de Genève, Geneva ^{61}
20:30		Report	Santos 44'; Kazim-Richards 84'	Attendance: 9,500; Referee: Daniel Stålhammar (Sweden)

27 August 2009 Second leg	Fenerbahçe (Turkey)	2–2	(Switzerland) Sion	Şükrü Saracoğlu Stadium, Istanbul
20:30	Santos 2', 41' (pen.)	Report	Vanczák 9'; Chihab 31' (pen.)	Attendance: 24,083; Referee: Bruno Paixão (Portugal)

Fenerbahçe won 4–2 on aggregate.

=== Vaduz ===
==== Europa League ====
===== Second qualifying round =====
16 July 2009 First leg	Falkirk (Scotland)	1–0	(Liechtenstein) Vaduz	Falkirk Stadium, Falkirk
20:30	Flynn 50'	Report		Attendance: 5,763; Referee: Damien Ledentu (France)

23 July 2009 Second leg	Vaduz (Liechtenstein)	2–0 (a.e.t.)	(Scotland) Falkirk	Rheinpark Stadion, Vaduz
19:30	Noll 24'; Burgmeier 105'	Report		Attendance: 1,842; Referee: Draženko Kovačić (Croatia)

Vaduz won 2–1 on aggregate.

===== Third qualifying round =====
30 July 2009	Vaduz (Liechtenstein)	0–1	(Czech Republic) Slovan Liberec	Rheinpark Stadion, Vaduz
19:30		Report	Blažek 43'	Attendance: 1,105; Referee: Marco Borg (Malta)

6 August 2009	Slovan Liberec (Czech Republic)	2–0	(Liechtenstein) Vaduz	U Nisy Stadium, Liberec
18:00	Kerić 17'; Nezmar 22'	Report		Attendance: 4,822; Referee: Markus Strömbergsson (Sweden)

Slovan Liberec won 3–0 on aggregate.

== Sources ==
- Switzerland 2009–10 at RSSSF
- 1. Liga season 2009–10 at the official website
- Cup finals at Fussball-Schweiz
- Josef Zindel (2018). FC Basel 1893. Die ersten 125 Jahre (in German). Basel: Friedrich Reinhardt Verlag. ISBN 978-3-7245-2305-5.

Preceded by 2008–09	Seasons in Swiss football	Succeeded by 2010–11
