= 2009–10 UEFA Champions League group stage =

International football competition

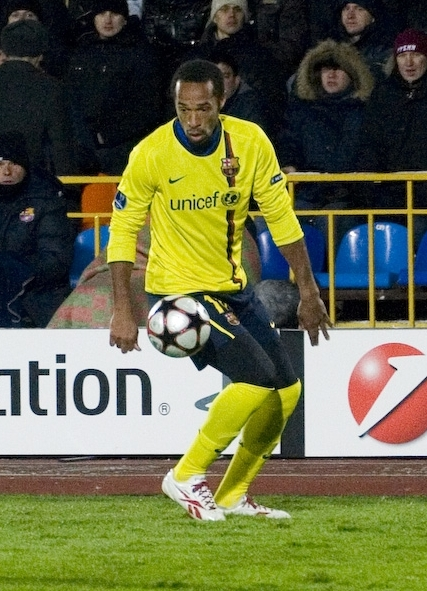
Thierry Henry of Barcelona in the match against Rubin Kazan at the Central Stadium.

The 2009–10 UEFA Champions League group stage matches took place between 15 September and 9 December 2009. The draw for the eight groups took place on 27 August 2009, at the Grimaldi Forum in Monaco.

The group stage featured the 22 automatic qualifiers and the 10 winners of the play-off round (five through the Champions Path, five through the Non-Champions Path).

After the completion of the group stage, the top two teams in each group advanced to play in the first knockout round, while the third-placed teams dropped down to the UEFA Europa League round of 32.

== Teams ==
The draw for the group stage was held in Monaco on 27 August 2009.

Seeding was determined by the UEFA coefficients: Pot 1 held teams ranked 1–8, Pot 2 held teams ranked 10–28, Pot 3 held teams ranked 34–64, while Pot 4 held teams ranked 97–190 and unranked teams.

Clubs from the same association were paired up to split the matchdays between Tuesday and Wednesday. Clubs with the same pairing letter played on different days, ensuring that teams from the same city (e.g. Milan and Inter Milan, who also share a stadium) did not play on the same day.

Group winners and runners-up advanced to the first knockout round
Third-placed teams entered the UEFA Europa League at the round of 32

Pot 1
| Team | Notes | Coeff. |
|---|---|---|
| (Spain) Barcelona | | 121.853 |
| (England) Chelsea | | 118.899 |
| (England) Liverpool | | 118.899 |
| (England) Manchester United | | 111.899 |
| (Italy) Milan | | 110.582 |
| (England) Arsenal | | 106.899 |
| (Spain) Sevilla | | 100.853 |
| (Germany) Bayern Munich | | 98.339 |

Pot 2
| Team | Notes | Coeff. |
|---|---|---|
| (France) Lyon | | 91.033 |
| (Italy) Inter Milan | | 87.582 |
| (Spain) Real Madrid | | 78.853 |
| (Russia) CSKA Moscow | | 71.525 |
| (Portugal) Porto | | 68.292 |
| (Netherlands) AZ | | 64.826 |
| (Italy) Juventus | | 63.582 |
| (Scotland) Rangers | | 56.575 |

Pot 3
| Team | Notes | Coeff. |
|---|---|---|
| (Greece) Olympiacos | | 52.633 |
| (France) Marseille | | 48.033 |
| (Ukraine) Dynamo Kyiv | | 46.370 |
| (Germany) VfB Stuttgart | | 45.339 |
| (Italy) Fiorentina | | 42.582 |
| (Spain) Atlético Madrid | | 41.853 |
| (France) Bordeaux | | 40.033 |
| (Turkey) Beşiktaş | | 32.445 |

Pot 4
| Team | Notes | Coeff. |
|---|---|---|
| (Germany) VfL Wolfsburg | | 21.339 |
| (Belgium) Standard Liège | | 21.065 |
| (Israel) Maccabi Haifa | | 17.050 |
| (Switzerland) Zürich | | 14.050 |
| (Russia) Rubin Kazan | | 9.525 |
| (Romania) Unirea Urziceni | | 8.781 |
| (Cyprus) APOEL | | 4.016 |
| (Hungary) Debrecen | | 1.633 |

Notes

1. ^{TH} Champions League title holders (automatic top seed of pot 1)
2. ^{CP} Winners of the play-off round (Champions Path)
3. ^{NCP} Winners of play-off round (Non-Champions Path)

== Tie-breaking criteria ==
Based on Article 7.06 in the UEFA regulations, if two or more teams were equal on points on completion of the group matches, the following criteria were applied to determine the rankings:

1. higher number of points obtained in the group matches played among the teams in question;
2. superior goal difference from the group matches played among the teams in question;
3. higher number of goals scored away from home in the group matches played among the teams in question;
4. superior goal difference from all group matches played;
5. higher number of goals scored;
6. higher number of coefficient points accumulated by the club in question, as well as its association, over the previous five seasons.

== Groups ==
Times are CET/CEST, (Note: CET (UTC+1) for matches from 3 November 2009, and CEST (UTC+2) for matches to 21 October 2009.) as listed by UEFA (local times, if different, are in parentheses).

=== Group A ===
| Pos | Team | Pld | W | D | L | GF | GA | GD | Pts | Qualification | BOR | BAY | JUV | MHA |
|---|---|---|---|---|---|---|---|---|---|---|---|---|---|---|
| 1 | (France) Bordeaux | 6 | 5 | 1 | 0 | 9 | 2 | +7 | 16 | Advance to knockout phase | — | 2–1 | 2–0 | 1–0 |
| 2 | (Germany) Bayern Munich | 6 | 3 | 1 | 2 | 9 | 5 | +4 | 10 | Advance to knockout phase | 0–2 | — | 0–0 | 1–0 |
| 3 | (Italy) Juventus | 6 | 2 | 2 | 2 | 4 | 7 | −3 | 8 | Transfer to Europa League | 1–1 | 1–4 | — | 1–0 |
| 4 | (Israel) Maccabi Haifa | 6 | 0 | 0 | 6 | 0 | 8 | −8 | 0 | | 0–1 | 0–3 | 0–1 | — |

Source: RSSSF
15 September 2009
20:45

| Juventus (Italy) | 1–1 | (France) Bordeaux |
|---|---|---|
| Iaquinta 63' | Report | Plašil 75' |

Stadio Olimpico, Turin (Note: Juventus played their home group matches at the Stadio Olimpico di Torino as their Stadio delle Alpi was demolished to make way for Juventus Stadium.)
Attendance: 17,513
Referee: Tom Henning Øvrebø (Norway)
15 September 2009
20:45 (21:45 UTC+3)

| Maccabi Haifa (Israel) | 0–3 | (Germany) Bayern Munich |
|---|---|---|
| | Report | Van Buyten 64'; Müller 85', 88' |

Ramat Gan Stadium, Ramat Gan (Note: Maccabi Haifa played their home group matches at the Ramat Gan Stadium in Tel Aviv District as their Kiryat Eliezer Stadium did not meet UEFA criteria.)
Attendance: 38,789
Referee: Damir Skomina (Slovenia)

30 September 2009
20:45

| Bayern Munich (Germany) | 0–0 | (Italy) Juventus |
|---|---|---|
| | Report |

Allianz Arena, Munich
Attendance: 66,000
Referee: Howard Webb (England)
30 September 2009
20:45

| Bordeaux (France) | 1–0 | (Israel) Maccabi Haifa |
|---|---|---|
| Ciani 83' | Report |

Stade Chaban-Delmas, Bordeaux
Attendance: 28,748
Referee: Eric Braamhaar (Netherlands)

21 October 2009
20:45

| Bordeaux (France) | 2–1 | (Germany) Bayern Munich |
|---|---|---|
| Ciani 27'; Planus 40' | Report | Ciani 6' (o.g.) |

Stade Chaban-Delmas, Bordeaux
Attendance: 31,321
Referee: Terje Hauge (Norway)
21 October 2009
20:45

| Juventus (Italy) | 1–0 | (Israel) Maccabi Haifa |
|---|---|---|
| Chiellini 47' | Report |

Stadio Olimpico, Turin
Attendance: 21,303
Referee: Olegário Benquerença (Portugal)

3 November 2009
20:45

| Bayern Munich (Germany) | 0–2 | (France) Bordeaux |
|---|---|---|
| | Report | Gourcuff 37'; Chamakh 90' |

Allianz Arena, Munich
Attendance: 66,000
Referee: Pedro Proença (Portugal)
3 November 2009
20:45 (21:45 UTC+2)

| Maccabi Haifa (Israel) | 0–1 | (Italy) Juventus |
|---|---|---|
| | Report | Camoranesi 45+2' |

Ramat Gan Stadium, Ramat Gan
Attendance: 39,120
Referee: Terje Hauge (Norway)

25 November 2009
20:45

| Bordeaux (France) | 2–0 | (Italy) Juventus |
|---|---|---|
| Fernando 54'; Chamakh 90+4' | Report |

Stade Chaban-Delmas, Bordeaux
Attendance: 32,195
Referee: Eduardo Iturralde González (Spain)
25 November 2009
20:45

| Bayern Munich (Germany) | 1–0 | (Israel) Maccabi Haifa |
|---|---|---|
| Olić 62' | Report |

Allianz Arena, Munich
Attendance: 58,000
Referee: Craig Thomson (Scotland)

8 December 2009
20:45

| Juventus (Italy) | 1–4 | (Germany) Bayern Munich |
|---|---|---|
| Trezeguet 19' | Report | Butt 30' (pen.); Olić 52'; Gómez 83'; Tymoshchuk 90+2' |

Stadio Olimpico, Turin
Attendance: 27,801
Referee: Massimo Busacca (Switzerland)
8 December 2009
20:45 (21:45 UTC+2)

| Maccabi Haifa (Israel) | 0–1 | (France) Bordeaux |
|---|---|---|
| | Report | Jussiê 13' |

Ramat Gan Stadium, Ramat Gan
Attendance: 25,800
Referee: Jonas Eriksson (Sweden)

=== Group B ===
| Pos | Team | Pld | W | D | L | GF | GA | GD | Pts | Qualification | MUN | CSKA | WOL | BES |
|---|---|---|---|---|---|---|---|---|---|---|---|---|---|---|
| 1 | (England) Manchester United | 6 | 4 | 1 | 1 | 10 | 6 | +4 | 13 | Advance to knockout phase | — | 3–3 | 2–1 | 0–1 |
| 2 | (Russia) CSKA Moscow | 6 | 3 | 1 | 2 | 10 | 10 | 0 | 10 | Advance to knockout phase | 0–1 | — | 2–1 | 2–1 |
| 3 | (Germany) VfL Wolfsburg | 6 | 2 | 1 | 3 | 9 | 8 | +1 | 7 | Transfer to Europa League | 1–3 | 3–1 | — | 0–0 |
| 4 | (Turkey) Beşiktaş | 6 | 1 | 1 | 4 | 3 | 8 | −5 | 4 | | 0–1 | 1–2 | 0–3 | — |

Source: RSSSF
15 September 2009
20:45

| VfL Wolfsburg (Germany) | 3–1 | (Russia) CSKA Moscow |
|---|---|---|
| Grafite 36', 41' (pen.), 87' | Report | Dzagoev 76' |

Volkswagen Arena, Wolfsburg
Attendance: 25,017
Referee: Stéphane Lannoy (France)
15 September 2009
20:45 (21:45 UTC+3)

| Beşiktaş (Turkey) | 0–1 | (England) Manchester United |
|---|---|---|
| | Report | Scholes 77' |

BJK İnönü Stadium, Istanbul
Attendance: 26,448
Referee: Nicola Rizzoli (Italy)

30 September 2009
18:30 (20:30 UTC+4)

| CSKA Moscow (Russia) | 2–1 | (Turkey) Beşiktaş |
|---|---|---|
| Dzagoev 7'; Krasić 61' | Report | Dağ 90+2' |

Luzhniki Stadium, Moscow
Attendance: 19,750
Referee: Manuel Mejuto González (Spain)
30 September 2009
20:45 (19:45 UTC+1)

| Manchester United (England) | 2–1 | (Germany) VfL Wolfsburg |
|---|---|---|
| Giggs 59'; Carrick 78' | Report | Džeko 56' |

Old Trafford, Manchester
Attendance: 74,037
Referee: Viktor Kassai (Hungary)

21 October 2009
18:30 (20:30 UTC+4)

| CSKA Moscow (Russia) | 0–1 | (England) Manchester United |
|---|---|---|
| | Report | Valencia 86' |

Luzhniki Stadium, Moscow
Attendance: 51,250
Referee: Claus Bo Larsen (Denmark)
21 October 2009
20:45

| VfL Wolfsburg (Germany) | 0–0 | (Turkey) Beşiktaş |
|---|---|---|
| | Report |

Volkswagen Arena, Wolfsburg
Attendance: 25,778
Referee: Roberto Rosetti (Italy)

3 November 2009
20:45 (19:45 UTC+0)

| Manchester United (England) | 3–3 | (Russia) CSKA Moscow |
|---|---|---|
| Owen 29'; Scholes 84'; Valencia 90+2' | Report | Dzagoev 25'; Krasić 31'; V. Berezutski 47' |

Old Trafford, Manchester
Attendance: 73,718
Referee: Olegário Benquerença (Portugal)
3 November 2009
20:45 (21:45 UTC+2)

| Beşiktaş (Turkey) | 0–3 | (Germany) VfL Wolfsburg |
|---|---|---|
| | Report | Misimović 14'; Gentner 80'; Džeko 87' |

BJK İnönü Stadium, Istanbul
Attendance: 18,116
Referee: Alberto Undiano Mallenco (Spain)

25 November 2009
18:30 (20:30 UTC+3)

| CSKA Moscow (Russia) | 2–1 | (Germany) VfL Wolfsburg |
|---|---|---|
| Necid 58'; Krasić 66' | Report | Džeko 19' |

Luzhniki Stadium, Moscow
Attendance: 13,478
Referee: Nicola Rizzoli (Italy)
25 November 2009
20:45 (19:45 UTC+0)

| Manchester United (England) | 0–1 | (Turkey) Beşiktaş |
|---|---|---|
| | Report | Tello 20' |

Old Trafford, Manchester
Attendance: 74,242
Referee: Stéphane Lannoy (France)

8 December 2009
20:45

| VfL Wolfsburg (Germany) | 1–3 | (England) Manchester United |
|---|---|---|
| Džeko 56' | Report | Owen 44', 83', 90+1' |

Volkswagen Arena, Wolfsburg
Attendance: 26,490
Referee: Björn Kuipers (Netherlands)
8 December 2009
20:45 (21:45 UTC+2)

| Beşiktaş (Turkey) | 1–2 | (Russia) CSKA Moscow |
|---|---|---|
| Bobô 86' | Report | Krasić 41'; Aldonin 90+5' |

BJK İnönü Stadium, Istanbul
Attendance: 16,129
Referee: Martin Hansson (Sweden)

=== Group C ===
| Pos | Team | Pld | W | D | L | GF | GA | GD | Pts | Qualification | RMA | MIL | MAR | ZUR |
|---|---|---|---|---|---|---|---|---|---|---|---|---|---|---|
| 1 | (Spain) Real Madrid | 6 | 4 | 1 | 1 | 15 | 7 | +8 | 13 | Advance to knockout phase | — | 2–3 | 3–0 | 1–0 |
| 2 | (Italy) Milan | 6 | 2 | 3 | 1 | 8 | 7 | +1 | 9 | Advance to knockout phase | 1–1 | — | 1–1 | 0–1 |
| 3 | (France) Marseille | 6 | 2 | 1 | 3 | 10 | 10 | 0 | 7 | Transfer to Europa League | 1–3 | 1–2 | — | 6–1 |
| 4 | (Switzerland) Zürich | 6 | 1 | 1 | 4 | 5 | 14 | −9 | 4 | | 2–5 | 1–1 | 0–1 | — |

Source: RSSSF
15 September 2009
20:45

| Zürich (Switzerland) | 2–5 | (Spain) Real Madrid |
|---|---|---|
| Margairaz 64' (pen.); Aegerter 65' | Report | Ronaldo 27', 89'; Raúl 34'; Higuaín 45+1'; Guti 90+4' |

Letzigrund, Zürich
Attendance: 24,424
Referee: Martin Atkinson (England)
15 September 2009
20:45

| Marseille (France) | 1–2 | (Italy) Milan |
|---|---|---|
| Heinze 49' | Report | Inzaghi 28', 74' |

Stade Vélodrome, Marseille
Attendance: 55,434
Referee: Claus Bo Larsen (Denmark)

30 September 2009
20:45

| Milan (Italy) | 0–1 | (Switzerland) Zürich |
|---|---|---|
| | Report | Tihinen 10' |

San Siro, Milan
Attendance: 32,439
Referee: Florian Meyer (Germany)
30 September 2009
20:45

| Real Madrid (Spain) | 3–0 | (France) Marseille |
|---|---|---|
| Ronaldo 58', 64'; Kaká 61' (pen.) | Report |

Santiago Bernabéu, Madrid
Attendance: 67,244
Referee: Martin Hansson (Sweden)

21 October 2009
20:45

| Real Madrid (Spain) | 2–3 | (Italy) Milan |
|---|---|---|
| Raúl 19'; Drenthe 76' | Report | Pirlo 62'; Pato 66', 88' |

Santiago Bernabéu, Madrid
Attendance: 71,569
Referee: Frank De Bleeckere (Belgium)
21 October 2009
20:45

| Zürich (Switzerland) | 0–1 | (France) Marseille |
|---|---|---|
| | Report | Heinze 69' |

Letzigrund, Zürich
Attendance: 22,300
Referee: Damir Skomina (Slovenia)

3 November 2009
20:45

| Milan (Italy) | 1–1 | (Spain) Real Madrid |
|---|---|---|
| Ronaldinho 35' (pen.) | Report | Benzema 29' |

San Siro, Milan
Attendance: 75,092
Referee: Felix Brych (Germany)
3 November 2009
20:45

| Marseille (France) | 6–1 | (Switzerland) Zürich |
|---|---|---|
| Aegerter 3' (o.g.); Abriel 11'; Niang 51'; Hilton 80'; Cheyrou 87'; Brandão 90' | Report | Alphonse 31' |

Stade Vélodrome, Marseille
Attendance: 56,282
Referee: Craig Thomson (Scotland)

25 November 2009
20:45

| Real Madrid (Spain) | 1–0 | (Switzerland) Zürich |
|---|---|---|
| Higuaín 21' | Report |

Santiago Bernabéu, Madrid
Attendance: 67,867
Referee: Alain Hamer (Luxembourg)
25 November 2009
20:45

| Milan (Italy) | 1–1 | (France) Marseille |
|---|---|---|
| Borriello 10' | Report | Lucho 16' |

San Siro, Milan
Attendance: 49,063
Referee: Howard Webb (England)

8 December 2009
20:45

| Zürich (Switzerland) | 1–1 | (Italy) Milan |
|---|---|---|
| Gajić 29' | Report | Ronaldinho 64' (pen.) |

Letzigrund, Zürich
Attendance: 24,100
Referee: Pedro Proença (Portugal)
8 December 2009
20:45

| Marseille (France) | 1–3 | (Spain) Real Madrid |
|---|---|---|
| Lucho 11' | Report | Ronaldo 5', 80'; Albiol 60' |

Stade Vélodrome, Marseille
Attendance: 55,722
Referee: Wolfgang Stark (Germany)

=== Group D ===
| Pos | Team | Pld | W | D | L | GF | GA | GD | Pts | Qualification | CHE | POR | ATM | APO |
|---|---|---|---|---|---|---|---|---|---|---|---|---|---|---|
| 1 | (England) Chelsea | 6 | 4 | 2 | 0 | 11 | 4 | +7 | 14 | Advance to knockout phase | — | 1–0 | 4–0 | 2–2 |
| 2 | (Portugal) Porto | 6 | 4 | 0 | 2 | 8 | 3 | +5 | 12 | Advance to knockout phase | 0–1 | — | 2–0 | 2–1 |
| 3 | (Spain) Atlético Madrid | 6 | 0 | 3 | 3 | 3 | 12 | −9 | 3 | Transfer to Europa League | 2–2 | 0–3 | — | 0–0 |
| 4 | (Cyprus) APOEL | 6 | 0 | 3 | 3 | 4 | 7 | −3 | 3 | | 0–1 | 0–1 | 1–1 | — |

Source: RSSSF
15 September 2009
20:45 (19:45 UTC+1)

| Chelsea (England) | 1–0 | (Portugal) Porto |
|---|---|---|
| Anelka 48' | Report |

Stamford Bridge, London
Attendance: 39,436
Referee: Konrad Plautz (Austria)
15 September 2009
20:45

| Atlético Madrid (Spain) | 0–0 | (Cyprus) APOEL |
|---|---|---|
| | Report |

Vicente Calderón, Madrid
Attendance: 30,628
Referee: Craig Thomson (Scotland)

30 September 2009
20:45 (21:45 UTC+3)

| APOEL (Cyprus) | 0–1 | (England) Chelsea |
|---|---|---|
| | Report | Anelka 18' |

GSP Stadium, Nicosia
Attendance: 21,657
Referee: Bertrand Layec (France)
30 September 2009
20:45 (19:45 UTC+1)

| Porto (Portugal) | 2–0 | (Spain) Atlético Madrid |
|---|---|---|
| Falcao 75'; Rolando 82' | Report |

Estádio do Dragão, Porto
Attendance: 37,609
Referee: Nicola Rizzoli (Italy)

21 October 2009
20:45 (19:45 UTC+1)

| Porto (Portugal) | 2–1 | (Cyprus) APOEL |
|---|---|---|
| Hulk 33', 48' (pen.) | Report | Á. Pereira 22' (o.g.) |

Estádio do Dragão, Porto
Attendance: 31,212
Referee: Felix Brych (Germany)
21 October 2009
20:45 (19:45 UTC+1)

| Chelsea (England) | 4–0 | (Spain) Atlético Madrid |
|---|---|---|
| Kalou 41', 52'; Lampard 69'; Perea 90+1' (o.g.) | Report |

Stamford Bridge, London
Attendance: 39,997
Referee: Florian Meyer (Germany)

3 November 2009
20:45 (21:45 UTC+2)

| APOEL (Cyprus) | 0–1 | (Portugal) Porto |
|---|---|---|
| | Report | Falcao 84' |

GSP Stadium, Nicosia
Attendance: 20,825
Referee: Damir Skomina (Slovenia)
3 November 2009
20:45

| Atlético Madrid (Spain) | 2–2 | (England) Chelsea |
|---|---|---|
| Agüero 66', 90+1' | Report | Drogba 82', 88' |

Vicente Calderón, Madrid
Attendance: 36,284
Referee: Björn Kuipers (Netherlands)

25 November 2009
20:45 (19:45 UTC+0)

| Porto (Portugal) | 0–1 | (England) Chelsea |
|---|---|---|
| | Report | Anelka 69' |

Estádio do Dragão, Porto
Attendance: 38,410
Referee: Jonas Eriksson (Sweden)
25 November 2009
20:45 (21:45 UTC+2)

| APOEL (Cyprus) | 1–1 | (Spain) Atlético Madrid |
|---|---|---|
| Mirosavljević 5' | Report | Simão 62' |

GSP Stadium, Nicosia
Attendance: 21,178
Referee: Frank De Bleeckere (Belgium)

8 December 2009
20:45 (19:45 UTC+0)

| Chelsea (England) | 2–2 | (Cyprus) APOEL |
|---|---|---|
| Essien 19'; Drogba 26' | Report | Żewłakow 6'; Mirosavljević 87' |

Stamford Bridge, London
Attendance: 40,917
Referee: Matteo Trefoloni (Italy)
8 December 2009
20:45

| Atlético Madrid (Spain) | 0–3 | (Portugal) Porto |
|---|---|---|
| | Report | Alves 2'; Falcao 14'; Hulk 76' |

Vicente Calderón, Madrid
Attendance: 24,603
Referee: Stéphane Lannoy (France)

=== Group E ===
| Pos | Team | Pld | W | D | L | GF | GA | GD | Pts | Qualification | FIO | LYO | LIV | DEB |
|---|---|---|---|---|---|---|---|---|---|---|---|---|---|---|
| 1 | (Italy) Fiorentina | 6 | 5 | 0 | 1 | 14 | 7 | +7 | 15 | Advance to knockout phase | — | 1–0 | 2–0 | 5–2 |
| 2 | (France) Lyon | 6 | 4 | 1 | 1 | 12 | 3 | +9 | 13 | Advance to knockout phase | 1–0 | — | 1–1 | 4–0 |
| 3 | (England) Liverpool | 6 | 2 | 1 | 3 | 5 | 7 | −2 | 7 | Transfer to Europa League | 1–2 | 1–2 | — | 1–0 |
| 4 | (Hungary) Debrecen | 6 | 0 | 0 | 6 | 5 | 19 | −14 | 0 | | 3–4 | 0–4 | 0–1 | — |

Source: RSSSF
16 September 2009
20:45 (19:45 UTC+1)

| Liverpool (England) | 1–0 | (Hungary) Debrecen |
|---|---|---|
| Kuyt 45+1' | Report |

Anfield, Liverpool
Attendance: 41,591
Referee: Pedro Proença (Portugal)
16 September 2009
20:45

| Lyon (France) | 1–0 | (Italy) Fiorentina |
|---|---|---|
| Pjanić 76' | Report |

Stade de Gerland, Lyon
Attendance: 37,169
Referee: Pieter Vink (Netherlands)

29 September 2009
20:45

| Fiorentina (Italy) | 2–0 | (England) Liverpool |
|---|---|---|
| Jovetić 28', 37' | Report |

Stadio Artemio Franchi, Florence
Attendance: 33,426
Referee: Felix Brych (Germany)
29 September 2009
20:45

| Debrecen (Hungary) | 0–4 | (France) Lyon |
|---|---|---|
| | Report | Källström 3'; Pjanić 13'; Govou 24'; Gomis 51' |

Ferenc Puskás Stadium, Budapest (Note: Debrecen played their home group matches at Ferenc Puskás Stadium in Budapest as their Stadion Oláh Gábor Út did not meet UEFA criteria.)
Attendance: 41,600
Referee: Tom Henning Øvrebø (Norway)

20 October 2009
20:45

| Debrecen (Hungary) | 3–4 | (Italy) Fiorentina |
|---|---|---|
| Czvitkovics 2'; Rudolf 28'; Coulibaly 88' | Report | Mutu 6', 20'; Gilardino 10'; Santana 37' |

Ferenc Puskás Stadium, Budapest
Attendance: 41,500
Referee: Craig Thomson (Scotland)
20 October 2009
20:45 (19:45 UTC+1)

| Liverpool (England) | 1–2 | (France) Lyon |
|---|---|---|
| Benayoun 41' | Report | Gonalons 72'; Delgado 90+1' |

Anfield, Liverpool
Attendance: 41,562
Referee: Alberto Undiano Mallenco (Spain)

4 November 2009
20:45

| Fiorentina (Italy) | 5–2 | (Hungary) Debrecen |
|---|---|---|
| Mutu 14'; Dainelli 52'; Montolivo 59'; Marchionni 61'; Gilardino 74' | Report | Rudolf 38'; Coulibaly 70' |

Stadio Artemio Franchi, Florence
Attendance: 19,676
Referee: Manuel Mejuto González (Spain)
4 November 2009
20:45

| Lyon (France) | 1–1 | (England) Liverpool |
|---|---|---|
| Lisandro 90' | Report | Babel 83' |

Stade de Gerland, Lyon
Attendance: 39,180
Referee: Frank De Bleeckere (Belgium)

24 November 2009
20:45

| Debrecen (Hungary) | 0–1 | (England) Liverpool |
|---|---|---|
| | Report | Ngog 4' |

Ferenc Puskás Stadium, Budapest
Attendance: 41,500
Referee: Björn Kuipers (Netherlands)
24 November 2009
20:45

| Fiorentina (Italy) | 1–0 | (France) Lyon |
|---|---|---|
| Vargas 28' (pen.) | Report |

Stadio Artemio Franchi, Florence
Attendance: 34,301
Referee: Olegário Benquerença (Portugal)

9 December 2009
20:45 (19:45 UTC+0)

| Liverpool (England) | 1–2 | (Italy) Fiorentina |
|---|---|---|
| Benayoun 43' | Report | Jørgensen 63'; Gilardino 90+2' |

Anfield, Liverpool
Attendance: 40,863
Referee: Damir Skomina (Slovenia)
9 December 2009
20:45

| Lyon (France) | 4–0 | (Hungary) Debrecen |
|---|---|---|
| Gomis 25'; Bastos 45'; Pjanić 59'; Cissokho 76' | Report |

Stade de Gerland, Lyon
Attendance: 36,884
Referee: Florian Meyer (Germany)

=== Group F ===
| Pos | Team | Pld | W | D | L | GF | GA | GD | Pts | Qualification | BAR | INT | RUB | DKV |
|---|---|---|---|---|---|---|---|---|---|---|---|---|---|---|
| 1 | (Spain) Barcelona | 6 | 3 | 2 | 1 | 7 | 3 | +4 | 11 | Advance to knockout phase | — | 2–0 | 1–2 | 2–0 |
| 2 | (Italy) Inter Milan | 6 | 2 | 3 | 1 | 7 | 6 | +1 | 9 | Advance to knockout phase | 0–0 | — | 2–0 | 2–2 |
| 3 | (Russia) Rubin Kazan | 6 | 1 | 3 | 2 | 4 | 7 | −3 | 6 | Transfer to Europa League | 0–0 | 1–1 | — | 0–0 |
| 4 | (Ukraine) Dynamo Kyiv | 6 | 1 | 2 | 3 | 7 | 9 | −2 | 5 | | 1–2 | 1–2 | 3–1 | — |

Source: RSSSF
16 September 2009
20:45

| Inter Milan (Italy) | 0–0 | (Spain) Barcelona |
|---|---|---|
| | Report |

San Siro, Milan
Attendance: 77,321
Referee: Wolfgang Stark (Germany)
16 September 2009
20:45 (21:45 UTC+3)

| Dynamo Kyiv (Ukraine) | 3–1 | (Russia) Rubin Kazan |
|---|---|---|
| Yussuf 71'; Magrão 79'; Husyev 85' | Report | Domínguez 25' |

Valeriy Lobanovskyi Dynamo Stadium, Kyiv
Attendance: 15,000
Referee: Alain Hamer (Luxembourg)

29 September 2009
18:30 (20:30 UTC+4)

| Rubin Kazan (Russia) | 1–1 | (Italy) Inter Milan |
|---|---|---|
| Domínguez 11' | Report | Stanković 27' |

Central Stadium, Kazan
Attendance: 23,670
Referee: Terje Hauge (Norway)
29 September 2009
20:45

| Barcelona (Spain) | 2–0 | (Ukraine) Dynamo Kyiv |
|---|---|---|
| Messi 26'; Pedro 76' | Report |

Camp Nou, Barcelona
Attendance: 68,221
Referee: Björn Kuipers (Netherlands)

20 October 2009
20:45

| Barcelona (Spain) | 1–2 | (Russia) Rubin Kazan |
|---|---|---|
| Ibrahimović 48' | Report | Ryazantsev 2'; Gökdeniz 73' |

Camp Nou, Barcelona
Attendance: 55,930
Referee: Laurent Duhamel (France)
20 October 2009
20:45

| Inter Milan (Italy) | 2–2 | (Ukraine) Dynamo Kyiv |
|---|---|---|
| Stanković 35'; Samuel 47' | Report | Mykhalyk 5'; Lúcio 40' (o.g.) |

San Siro, Milan
Attendance: 34,721
Referee: Martin Atkinson (England)

4 November 2009
18:30 (20:30 UTC+3)

| Rubin Kazan (Russia) | 0–0 | (Spain) Barcelona |
|---|---|---|
| | Report |

Central Stadium, Kazan
Attendance: 24,600
Referee: Konrad Plautz (Austria)
4 November 2009
20:45 (21:45 UTC+2)

| Dynamo Kyiv (Ukraine) | 1–2 | (Italy) Inter Milan |
|---|---|---|
| Shevchenko 21' | Report | Milito 86'; Sneijder 89' |

Valeriy Lobanovskyi Dynamo Stadium, Kyiv
Attendance: 15,900
Referee: Bertrand Layec (France)

24 November 2009
18:30 (20:30 UTC+3)

| Rubin Kazan (Russia) | 0–0 | (Ukraine) Dynamo Kyiv |
|---|---|---|
| | Report |

Central Stadium, Kazan
Attendance: 23,185
Referee: Felix Brych (Germany)
24 November 2009
20:45

| Barcelona (Spain) | 2–0 | (Italy) Inter Milan |
|---|---|---|
| Piqué 10'; Pedro 26' | Report |

Camp Nou, Barcelona
Attendance: 93,524
Referee: Massimo Busacca (Switzerland)

9 December 2009
20:45

| Inter Milan (Italy) | 2–0 | (Russia) Rubin Kazan |
|---|---|---|
| Eto'o 31'; Balotelli 64' | Report |

San Siro, Milan
Attendance: 49,539
Referee: Pieter Vink (Netherlands)
9 December 2009
20:45 (21:45 UTC+2)

| Dynamo Kyiv (Ukraine) | 1–2 | (Spain) Barcelona |
|---|---|---|
| Milevskyi 2' | Report | Xavi 33'; Messi 86' |

Valeriy Lobanovskyi Dynamo Stadium, Kyiv
Attendance: 16,300
Referee: Howard Webb (England)

=== Group G ===
| Pos | Team | Pld | W | D | L | GF | GA | GD | Pts | Qualification | SEV | STU | URZ | RAN |
|---|---|---|---|---|---|---|---|---|---|---|---|---|---|---|
| 1 | (Spain) Sevilla | 6 | 4 | 1 | 1 | 11 | 4 | +7 | 13 | Advance to knockout phase | — | 1–1 | 2–0 | 1–0 |
| 2 | (Germany) VfB Stuttgart | 6 | 2 | 3 | 1 | 9 | 7 | +2 | 9 | Advance to knockout phase | 1–3 | — | 3–1 | 1–1 |
| 3 | (Romania) Unirea Urziceni | 6 | 2 | 2 | 2 | 8 | 8 | 0 | 8 | Transfer to Europa League | 1–0 | 1–1 | — | 1–1 |
| 4 | (Scotland) Rangers | 6 | 0 | 2 | 4 | 4 | 13 | −9 | 2 | | 1–4 | 0–2 | 1–4 | — |

Source: RSSSF
16 September 2009
20:45

| VfB Stuttgart (Germany) | 1–1 | (Scotland) Rangers |
|---|---|---|
| Pogrebnyak 18' | Report | Bougherra 77' |

Mercedes-Benz Arena, Stuttgart
Attendance: 39,000
Referee: Massimo Busacca (Switzerland)
16 September 2009
20:45

| Sevilla (Spain) | 2–0 | (Romania) Unirea Urziceni |
|---|---|---|
| Luís Fabiano 45+1'; Renato 70' | Report |

Ramón Sánchez Pizjuán, Seville
Attendance: 37,500
Referee: Matteo Trefoloni (Italy)

29 September 2009
20:45 (21:45 UTC+3)

| Unirea Urziceni (Romania) | 1–1 | (Germany) VfB Stuttgart |
|---|---|---|
| Varga 48' | Report | Tasci 5' |

Stadionul Steaua, Bucharest (Note: Unirea Urziceni played their home group matches at Stadionul Steaua in Bucharest as their Stadionul Tineretului did not meet UEFA criteria.)
Attendance: 13,557
Referee: Laurent Duhamel (France)
29 September 2009
20:45 (19:45 UTC+1)

| Rangers (Scotland) | 1–4 | (Spain) Sevilla |
|---|---|---|
| Novo 88' | Report | Konko 50'; Adriano 64'; Luís Fabiano 72'; Kanouté 74' |

Ibrox Stadium, Glasgow
Attendance: 40,572
Referee: Jonas Eriksson (Sweden)

20 October 2009
20:45 (19:45 UTC+1)

| Rangers (Scotland) | 1–4 | (Romania) Unirea Urziceni |
|---|---|---|
| Vilana 2' (o.g.) | Report | Bilașco 32'; Lafferty 49' (o.g.); McCulloch 59' (o.g.); Brandán 65' |

Ibrox Stadium, Glasgow
Attendance: 39,476
Referee: Eric Braamhaar (Netherlands)
20 October 2009
20:45

| VfB Stuttgart (Germany) | 1–3 | (Spain) Sevilla |
|---|---|---|
| Élson 74' | Report | Squillaci 23', 72'; Navas 55' |

Mercedes-Benz Arena, Stuttgart
Attendance: 37,000
Referee: Pieter Vink (Netherlands)

4 November 2009
20:45 (21:45 UTC+2)

| Unirea Urziceni (Romania) | 1–1 | (Scotland) Rangers |
|---|---|---|
| Onofraș 88' | Report | McCulloch 79' |

Stadionul Steaua, Bucharest
Attendance: 9,923
Referee: Claus Bo Larsen (Denmark)
4 November 2009
20:45

| Sevilla (Spain) | 1–1 | (Germany) VfB Stuttgart |
|---|---|---|
| Navas 14' | Report | Kuzmanović 79' |

Ramón Sánchez Pizjuán, Seville
Attendance: 32,669
Referee: Martin Atkinson (England)

24 November 2009
20:45 (19:45 UTC+0)

| Rangers (Scotland) | 0–2 | (Germany) VfB Stuttgart |
|---|---|---|
| | Report | Rudy 16'; Kuzmanović 59' |

Ibrox Stadium, Glasgow
Attendance: 41,468
Referee: Roberto Rosetti (Italy)
24 November 2009
20:45 (21:45 UTC+2)

| Unirea Urziceni (Romania) | 1–0 | (Spain) Sevilla |
|---|---|---|
| Dragutinović 45' (o.g.) | Report |

Stadionul Steaua, Bucharest
Attendance: 10,007
Referee: Tom Henning Øvrebø (Norway)

9 December 2009
20:45

| VfB Stuttgart (Germany) | 3–1 | (Romania) Unirea Urziceni |
|---|---|---|
| Marica 5'; Träsch 8'; Pogrebnyak 11' | Report | Semedo 46' |

Mercedes-Benz Arena, Stuttgart
Attendance: 37,000
Referee: Viktor Kassai (Hungary)
9 December 2009
20:45

| Sevilla (Spain) | 1–0 | (Scotland) Rangers |
|---|---|---|
| Kanouté 8' (pen.) | Report |

Ramón Sánchez Pizjuán, Seville
Attendance: 31,560
Referee: Bertrand Layec (France)

=== Group H ===
| Pos | Team | Pld | W | D | L | GF | GA | GD | Pts | Qualification | ARS | OLY | STL | AZ |
|---|---|---|---|---|---|---|---|---|---|---|---|---|---|---|
| 1 | (England) Arsenal | 6 | 4 | 1 | 1 | 12 | 5 | +7 | 13 | Advance to knockout phase | — | 2–0 | 2–0 | 4–1 |
| 2 | (Greece) Olympiacos | 6 | 3 | 1 | 2 | 4 | 5 | −1 | 10 | Advance to knockout phase | 1–0 | — | 2–1 | 1–0 |
| 3 | (Belgium) Standard Liège | 6 | 1 | 2 | 3 | 7 | 9 | −2 | 5 | Transfer to Europa League | 2–3 | 2–0 | — | 1–1 |
| 4 | (Netherlands) AZ | 6 | 0 | 4 | 2 | 4 | 8 | −4 | 4 | | 1–1 | 0–0 | 1–1 | — |

Source: RSSSF
16 September 2009
20:45 (21:45 UTC+3)

| Olympiacos (Greece) | 1–0 | (Netherlands) AZ |
|---|---|---|
| Torosidis 79' | Report |

Karaiskakis Stadium, Piraeus
Attendance: 29,018
Referee: Viktor Kassai (Hungary)
16 September 2009
20:45

| Standard Liège (Belgium) | 2–3 | (England) Arsenal |
|---|---|---|
| Mangala 3'; Jovanović 5' (pen.) | Report | Bendtner 45'; Vermaelen 77'; Eduardo 81' |

Stade Maurice Dufrasne, Liège
Attendance: 23,022
Referee: Eduardo Iturralde González (Spain)

29 September 2009
20:45 (19:45 UTC+1)

| Arsenal (England) | 2–0 | (Greece) Olympiacos |
|---|---|---|
| Van Persie 78'; Arshavin 86' | Report |

Emirates Stadium, London
Attendance: 59,884
Referee: Stéphane Lannoy (France)
29 September 2009
20:45

| AZ (Netherlands) | 1–1 | (Belgium) Standard Liège |
|---|---|---|
| El Hamdaoui 48' | Report | Traoré 90+1' |

DSB Stadion, Alkmaar
Attendance: 16,373
Referee: Wolfgang Stark (Germany)

20 October 2009
20:45

| AZ (Netherlands) | 1–1 | (England) Arsenal |
|---|---|---|
| Mendes 90+3' | Report | Fàbregas 36' |

DSB Stadion, Alkmaar
Attendance: 16,666
Referee: Martin Hansson (Sweden)
20 October 2009
20:45 (21:45 UTC+3)

| Olympiacos (Greece) | 2–1 | (Belgium) Standard Liège |
|---|---|---|
| Mitroglou 43'; Stoltidis 90+3' | Report | De Camargo 37' |

Karaiskakis Stadium, Piraeus
Attendance: 29,889
Referee: Pedro Proença (Portugal)

4 November 2009
20:45 (19:45 UTC+0)

| Arsenal (England) | 4–1 | (Netherlands) AZ |
|---|---|---|
| Fàbregas 25', 52'; Nasri 43'; Diaby 72' | Report | Lens 82' |

Emirates Stadium, London
Attendance: 59,345
Referee: Alain Hamer (Luxembourg)
4 November 2009
20:45

| Standard Liège (Belgium) | 2–0 | (Greece) Olympiacos |
|---|---|---|
| Mbokani 31'; Jovanović 88' | Report |

Stade Maurice Dufrasne, Liège
Attendance: 24,787
Referee: Nicola Rizzoli (Italy)

24 November 2009
20:45

| AZ (Netherlands) | 0–0 | (Greece) Olympiacos |
|---|---|---|
| | Report |

DSB Stadion, Alkmaar
Attendance: 16,213
Referee: Alberto Undiano Mallenco (Spain)
24 November 2009
20:45 (19:45 UTC+0)

| Arsenal (England) | 2–0 | (Belgium) Standard Liège |
|---|---|---|
| Nasri 35'; Denílson 45+2' | Report |

Emirates Stadium, London
Attendance: 59,941
Referee: Konrad Plautz (Austria)

9 December 2009
20:45 (21:45 UTC+2)

| Olympiacos (Greece) | 1–0 | (England) Arsenal |
|---|---|---|
| Leonardo 47' | Report |

Karaiskakis Stadium, Piraeus
Attendance: 30,277
Referee: Lucílio Batista (Portugal)
9 December 2009
20:45

| Standard Liège (Belgium) | 1–1 | (Netherlands) AZ |
|---|---|---|
| Bolat 90+5' | Report | Lens 42' |

Stade Maurice Dufrasne, Liège
Attendance: 24,359
Referee: Martin Atkinson (England)
