= Milan Gajić =

Milan Gajić may refer to:

- Milan Gajić (footballer, born 1986), Serbian football midfielder
- Milan Gajić (footballer, born 1996), Serbian football defender
