= Carlitos (footballer, born 1982) =

Portuguese footballer

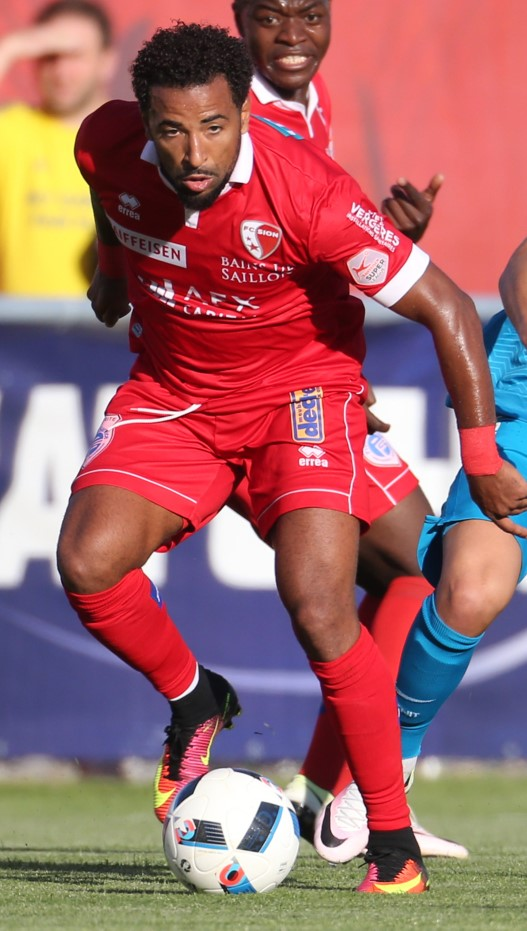
- Carlitos with Sion in 2016

Personal information
- Full name: Carlos Alberto Alves Garcia
- Date of birth: 6 September 1982 (age 44)
- Place of birth: Lisbon, Portugal
- Height: 1.76 m (5 ft 9 in)
- Position: Winger

Youth career
- 1993–2000: Arrentela
- 2000–2001: Amora

Senior career*
Years	Team	Apps	(Gls)
2001–2002	Amora	34	(5)
2002–2004	Estoril	72	(13)
2004–2007	Benfica	11	(0)
2005	Benfica B	2	(3)
2006	→ Vitória Setúbal (loan)	14	(4)
2006–2007	→ Sion (loan)	26	(8)
2007–2010	Basel	76	(11)
2010–2012	Hannover 96	8	(0)
2012–2014	Estoril	44	(4)
2014–2019	Sion	104	(16)
Total		391	(64)

International career
2004	Portugal U21	7	(2)
Medal record
Men's football
Representing Portugal
UEFA European Under-21 Championship
Third place	2004 Germany
- * Club domestic league appearances and goals

Carlos Alberto Alves Garcia (born 6 September 1982), known as Carlitos, is a Portuguese former professional footballer who played as a right winger.

In his country, he played mainly with Estoril, but also won the 2004–05 Primeira Liga with Benfica. He spent most of his career in Switzerland, with Sion and Basel.

== Club career ==
=== Early years ===
Born in Lisbon, Carlitos started his professional career at Amora F.C. in 2001. He moved to neighbours G.D. Estoril Praia one year later, achieving promotion to the Primeira Liga in his second season by scoring ten goals.

=== Benfica ===
Subsequently, Carlitos caught the eye of S.L. Benfica, who signed the player after the 2004 UEFA European Under-21 Championship in Germany, where he appeared with Portugal. He helped the club to their first league title in 11 years, but could never break into the first team (ten matches, nine as a substitute, none complete).

Carlitos went on loan to Vitória de Setúbal in January 2006, making a good impression in six months. In June, he returned to Benfica but was immediately loaned again, this time to Swiss side FC Sion, teaming up with compatriot – of Benfica and FC Porto fame – João Manuel Pinto.

=== Basel ===
In July 2007, Carlitos was sold definitely but stayed in the country, joining FC Basel for a fee of €1.5 million. He made his Swiss Super League debut for his new team on 28 July, in a 1–1 draw against FC Aarau at St. Jakob-Park. He scored his first goal for them on 30 August, closing the 4–0 away win over SV Mattersburg in the second qualifying round of the UEFA Cup. On 5 December, he scored the club's 200th goal in European competition, curling the ball into the back of the net from a free kick against SK Brann, which also meant that Basel reached the round of 32; he and his side eventually won a domestic double of league and cup.

Carlitos was part of the squad that conquered the Uhrencup to kickstart the 2008–09 campaign. He played nine games in ten in that season's UEFA Champions League, ended in group-stage elimination.

In 2009–10, Carlitos and Basel won another double. In the Cup final, he was unused in the 6–0 victory against FC Lausanne-Sport.

Over a three-year spell, Carlitos totalled 111 appearances and 20 goals.

=== Hannover ===
On 1 August 2010, Carlitos moved to Germany and its Bundesliga by signing with Hannover 96 for an undisclosed fee. He made his debut on the 21st, retiring injured after three minutes in an eventual 2–1 home defeat of Eintracht Frankfurt.

After being diagnosed with a tore cruciate ligament, Carlitos featured rarely until the end of his contract.

=== Later career ===
Carlitos returned to Portugal and its top division on 31 August 2012, re-joining his former club Estoril. He scored his first goal for them in the competition on 9 February 2013 to close a 2–0 home victory over Vitória de Guimarães, adding six matches and one goal in the 2013–14 UEFA Europa League.

In summer 2014, Carlitos returned to Sion on a two-year deal. On 4 February 2016, he renewed his link until 2018.

== International career ==
Carlitos earned his first cap for Portugal at under-21 level on 17 February 2004, in a 4–1 friendly win against Sweden. He was selected for the finals of the year's UEFA European Championship, scoring in extra time of the Olympic play-off to help to defeat the same adversary 3–2 in Oberhausen.

== Honours ==
Estoril

- Segunda Liga: 2003–04

Benfica

- Primeira Liga: 2004–05

Vitória Setúbal

- Taça de Portugal runner-up: 2005–06

Basel

- Swiss Super League: 2007–08, 2009–10
- Swiss Cup: 2007–08, 2009–10

Sion

- Swiss Cup: 2014–15

Individual

- Swiss Super League Team of the Year: 2015–16, 2016–17
- Swiss Super League Goal of the Year: 2016–17
