= Onyekachi Okonkwo =

Nigerian footballer

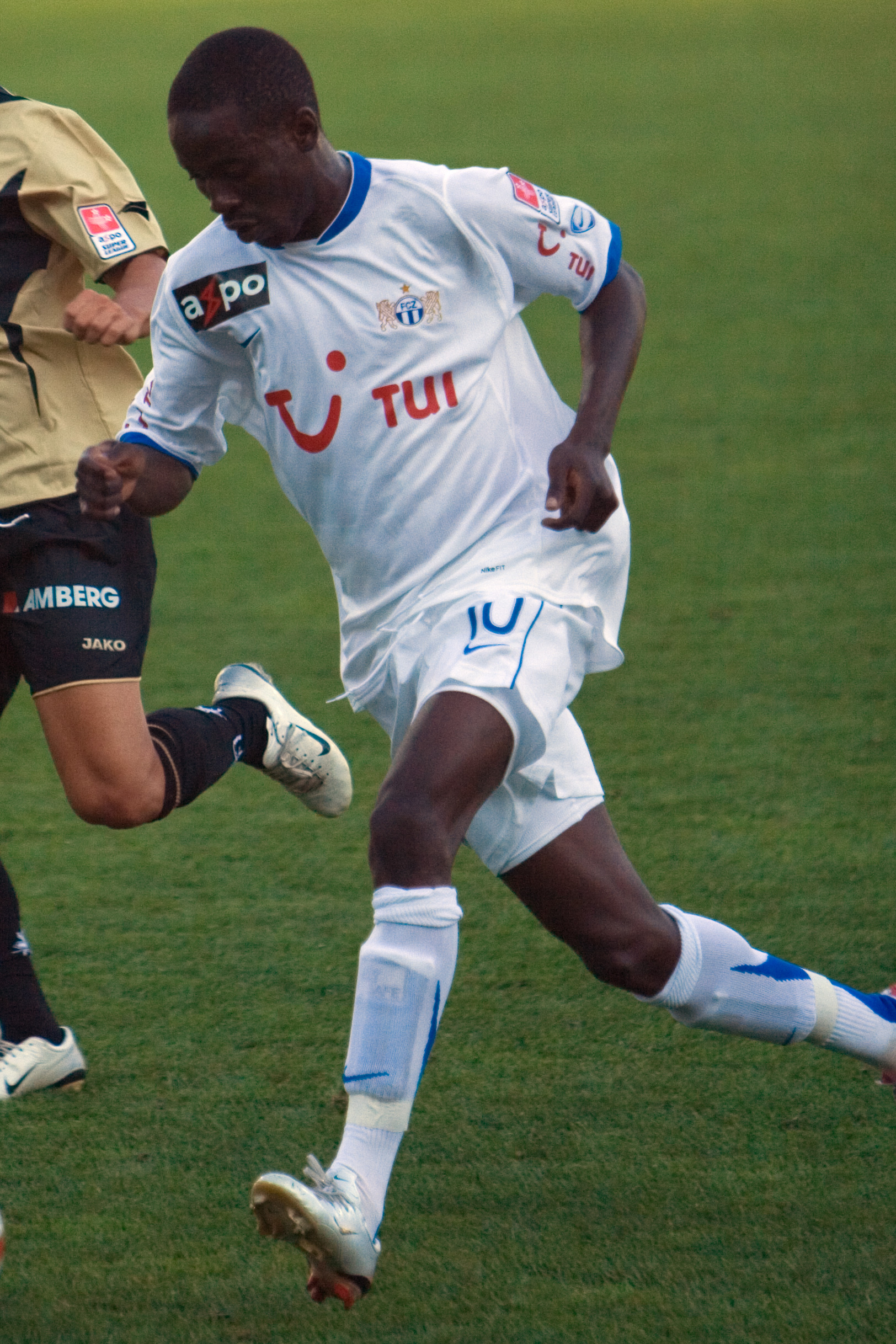

Personal information
- Full name: Onyekachi Donatus Okonkwo
- Date of birth: 13 May 1982 (age 44)
- Place of birth: Aba, Nigeria
- Height: 1.80 m (5 ft 11 in)
- Positions: Midfielder; centre back

Youth career
- Pepsi Football Academy
- Calabar Rovers

Senior career*
Years	Team	Apps	(Gls)
–2004	Enyimba	30	(6)
2004–2007	Orlando Pirates	43	(3)
2007–2010	FC Zürich	62	(2)
2010–2012	Al Kharitiyath	39	(5)
2012–2013	Orlando Pirates	20	(3)
2013–2015	Mpumalanga Black Aces	43	(2)
2015–2016	Mosta	17	(2)
2018–2019	Nuorese	25	(3)
2019–2020	Assisi Subasio		
2020–2021	Cortona Camucia		

International career^{‡}
2006–2008	Nigeria	20	(0)
- * Club domestic league appearances and goals as of 14 November 2022 ‡ National team caps and goals as of 14 November 2022

Onyekachi Donatus Okonkwo (born 13 May 1982 in Aba) is a Nigerian football midfielder.

== Club career ==
Okonkwo was a member of Enyimba's winning side in the 2003 MTN CAF Champions League and 2004 MTN CAF Champions League finals.

During his two-year stay in South Africa he was arguably one of the club's most influential players even scoring the decisive goal against his former club Enyimba to lead the Johannesburg-based club Orlando Pirates to the 2006 MTN CAF Champions League semifinals.

Okonkwo caused a stir in Europe by signing a pre-contract agreement with German side FC Köln only to leave the club a week later to sign a four-year deal at Swiss side FC Zürich saying that he had only ever agreed to a one-week trial at the German team. Despite FC Köln's sporting director Klaus Horstmann threatening to take the matter to FIFA in order for him to fulfil his obligations to his side, Okonkwo says he did not breach any rules in moving to Switzerland. He joined Qatari side Al Kharitiyath in the summer of 2010.

On 26 June 2012 Okonkwo rejoined Orlando Pirates and next year, on 12 July 2013, signed with local rivals Mpumalanga Black Aces.

== International ==
He won his first international cap for Nigeria in a 2008 Africa Cup of Nations qualifier against Lesotho in October 2006.

== Honours ==
FC Zürich

- Swiss Super League champions: 2008–09
