= 2009–10 Swiss Cup =

Tournament details
- Country: Switzerland
- Teams: 64

Final positions
- Champions: FC Basel
- Runners-up: FC Lausanne-Sport

Tournament statistics
- Top goal scorer: Marc Rüetschli (5)

The 2009–10 Swiss Cup was the 85th season of Switzerland's annual football cup competition. It began on 17 September with the first game of Round 1 and ended on 9 May 2010 with the Final held at St. Jakob-Park, Basel. The competition was won by FC Basel, who defeated second-level side Lausanne-Sport, 6–0. Since Basel also won the 2009–10 Swiss Super League, Lausanne qualified for the second qualification round of the UEFA Europa League.

== Participating clubs ==
All ten Super League teams and fifteen Challenge League clubs (FC Vaduz are from Liechtenstein and thus play in the 2009–10 Liechtenstein Cup) entered this year's competition, as well as thirteen teams from 1. Liga and 26 teams from lower leagues (their level within the Swiss league pyramid is given in parentheses below). Teams from 1. Liga and below had to qualify through separate qualifying rounds within their leagues.

2009–10 Super League; 10 teams	2009–10 Challenge League; 15 teams	2009–10 1. Liga; 13 teams	Amateur teams 26 teams
FC Aarau; FC Basel; AC Bellinzona; Grasshoppers Zürich; FC Luzern; Neuchâtel Xamax; FC St. Gallen; FC Sionth; BSC Young Boys; FC Zürich	FC Biel-Bienne; FC Concordia Basel; FC Gossau; SC Kriens; FC La Chaux-de-Fonds; FC Lausanne-Sport; FC Le Mont, Lausanne; FC Locarno; AC Lugano; FC Schaffhausen; Servette FC Genève; Stade Nyonnais; FC Thun; FC Wil; FC Winterthur; FC Wohlen; Yverdon-Sport FC	FC Baden; SC Cham; CS Chênois; FC Chiasso; FC Chur 97; FC Echallens; Etoile-Carouge FC; FC Laufen; FC Münsingen; FC Rapperswil-Jona; FC Schötz; FC Solothurn; FC Tuggen	Fourth level: SC Buochs; FC Colombier; FC Härkingen; FC Langenthal; FC La Tour/Le Pâquier; FC Le Locles Sport 1; FC Linth 04; Losone Sportiva; FC Serrières NE; FC Thalwil; FC Töss; Fifth level: FC Amicitia Riehen; FC Belp; FC Echichens; FC Farvagny/Ogoz 1; FC Frauenfeld; US Giubiasco; FC Montlingen; FC Regensdorf 1; FC Wängi; FC Zollikofen; Sixth level: FC Dottikon 1; FC La Combe; FC Muotathal; FC Vernier 1; FC Witikon 1

== Round 1 ==
Teams from Super League and Challenge League were seeded in this round. In a match, the home advantage was granted to the team from the lower league, if applicable.

Team 1	Score	Team 2
17 September 2009
FC Serrières NE	2–1 (a.e.t.)	FC Le Locles Sport 1
18 September 2009
FC Langenthal	0–3	FC Biel-Bienne
19 September 2009
FC Witikon 1	0–10	FC Zürich
FC La Combe	0–8	Neuchâtel Xamax
FC Münsingen	1–3 (a.e.t.)	FC Aarau
FC Belp	0–7	FC Solothurn
FC Tuggen	4–1	FC Schaffhausen
FC Thalwil	0–4 (a.e.t.)	FC Wil
FC Colombier	1–5	FC Lausanne-Sport
FC Echallens	0–1	FC Sion
CS Chênois	0–4	Servette FC Genève
FC Schötz	2–3	FC Luzern
FC Amicitia Riehen	0–4	FC Thun
FC Baden	1–3	BSC Young Boys
SC Buochs	1–6	SC Kriens
FC Zollikofen	1–2	FC Härkingen
FC Montlingen	0–4	FC Lugano
FC Regensdorf 1	1–3	FC Rapperswil-Jona
FC Töss	3–0	FC Chur 97
FC La Tour/Le Pâquier	1–3	Etoile-Carouge FC
FC Laufen	2–3	FC Wohlen
FC Muotathal	3–1	FC Dottikon 1
FC Wängi	1–3	FC Locarno
FC Frauenfeld	0–8	FC Winterthur
FC Linth 04	2–1	FC Gossau
FC Chiasso	0–3	Grasshoppers Zürich
Losone Sportiva	1–4	AC Bellinzona
20 September 2009
SC Cham	0–3	FC Basel
FC Echichens	0–6	FC Le Mont, Lausanne
FC Vernier 1	0–7	Stade Nyonnais
FC Farvagny/Ogoz 1	0–3	Yverdon-Sport FC
US Giubiasco	1–3 (a.e.t.)	FC St. Gallen

== Round 2 ==
The winners of Round 1 played in this round. Teams from Super League were seeded. In a match, the home advantage was granted to the team from the lower league, if applicable.

Team 1	Score	Team 2
17 October 2009
FC Rapperswil-Jona	4–1	FC Wohlen
FC Le Mont, Lausanne	1–3	FC Basel
SC Kriens	5–4	AC Bellinzona
FC Zürich	7–0	FC Locarno
FC Tuggen	1–3 (a.e.t.)	FC Winterthur
Neuchâtel Xamax	2–1	FC Serrières NE
Etoile-Carouge FC	0–3	Servette FC Genève
18 October 2009
FC Linth 04	1–4	FC Luzern
FC Biel-Bienne	3–2 (a.e.t.)	FC Aarau
FC Härkingen	1–3	FC Solothurn
FC Lugano	1–0	Grasshoppers Zürich
FC Thun	2–1 (a.e.t.)	FC Sion
FC St. Gallen	2–1	FC Wil
Yverdon Sports	1–3	BSC Young Boys
Stade Nyonnais	1–2	FC Lausanne-Sport
24 October 2009
FC Muotathal	0–3	FC Töss

== Round 3 ==
The winners of Round 2 played in this round. In a match, the home advantage was granted to the team from the lower league, if applicable.

Team 1	Score	Team 2
20 November 2009
FC Basel	4–2	FC Zürich
21 November 2009
FC Töss	1–2	FC Luzern
FC Rapperswil-Jona	3–5 (a.e.t.)	FC Biel-Bienne
Servette FC Genève	1–2 (a.e.t.)	FC St. Gallen
22 November 2009
FC Lugano	1–2	FC Lausanne-Sport
Neuchâtel Xamax	0–1	BSC Young Boys
FC Solothurn	2–4	SC Kriens
FC Winterthur	2–4 (a.e.t.)	FC Thun

== Quarter-finals ==
The winners of Round 3 played in this round.

10 December 2009
19:00 CET

FC Luzern	1 – 4	FC St. Gallen
Siegrist 49'		Frick 13'; Lang 40'; Pa Modou 43'; Koubský 74'

Gersag Stadion, Emmenbrücke
Attendance: 6,535
Referee: Cyril Zimmermann

12 December 2009
17:45 CET

FC Basel	3 – 1	FC Biel-Bienne
Frei 45', 60'; Streller 69'	Report	Hediger 76'

St. Jakob-Park, Basel
Attendance: 7,503
Referee: Stephan Studer

13 December 2009
14:00 CET

SC Kriens	2 – 1	FC Thun
Piu 5'; Pacar 51'		Volina 90+1'

Kleinfeld Stadium, Kriens
Attendance: 1,700
Referee: Carlo Bertolini

13 December 2009
14:30 CET

BSC Young Boys	1 – 4	FC Lausanne-Sport
Doumbia 22'		Tosi 17', 53'; Sonnerat 33'; Pimenta 90+5' (pen.)

Stade de Suisse, Bern
Attendance: 7,504
Referee: Sascha Kever

== Semi-finals ==
The winners in the quarter-finals played in this round.

5 April 2010
14:00 CEST

FC St. Gallen	1 – 2	FC Lausanne-Sport
Zé Vitor 22'		Katz 40'; Gaspar 79'

AFG Arena, St. Gallen
Attendance: 17,197
Referee: Massimo Busacca

5 April 2010
14:00 CEST

SC Kriens	0 – 1	FC Basel
	Report	Almerares 17'

Kleinfeld Stadium, Kriens
Attendance: 5,000
Referee: Daniel Wermelinger

== Final ==
The final was played on 9 May 2010 between the two semi-final winners and took place at St. Jakob-Park in Basel.

9 May 2010
16:30 CEST

FC Basel	6 – 0	FC Lausanne-Sport
Stocker 28' (75); Shaqiri 30'; Zoua 46'; Chipperfield 52'; Huggel 89'	Report

St. Jakob-Park, Basel
Attendance: 30,100
Referee: Sascha Kever
