= Zé Vítor (footballer, born 1982) =

Portuguese footballer

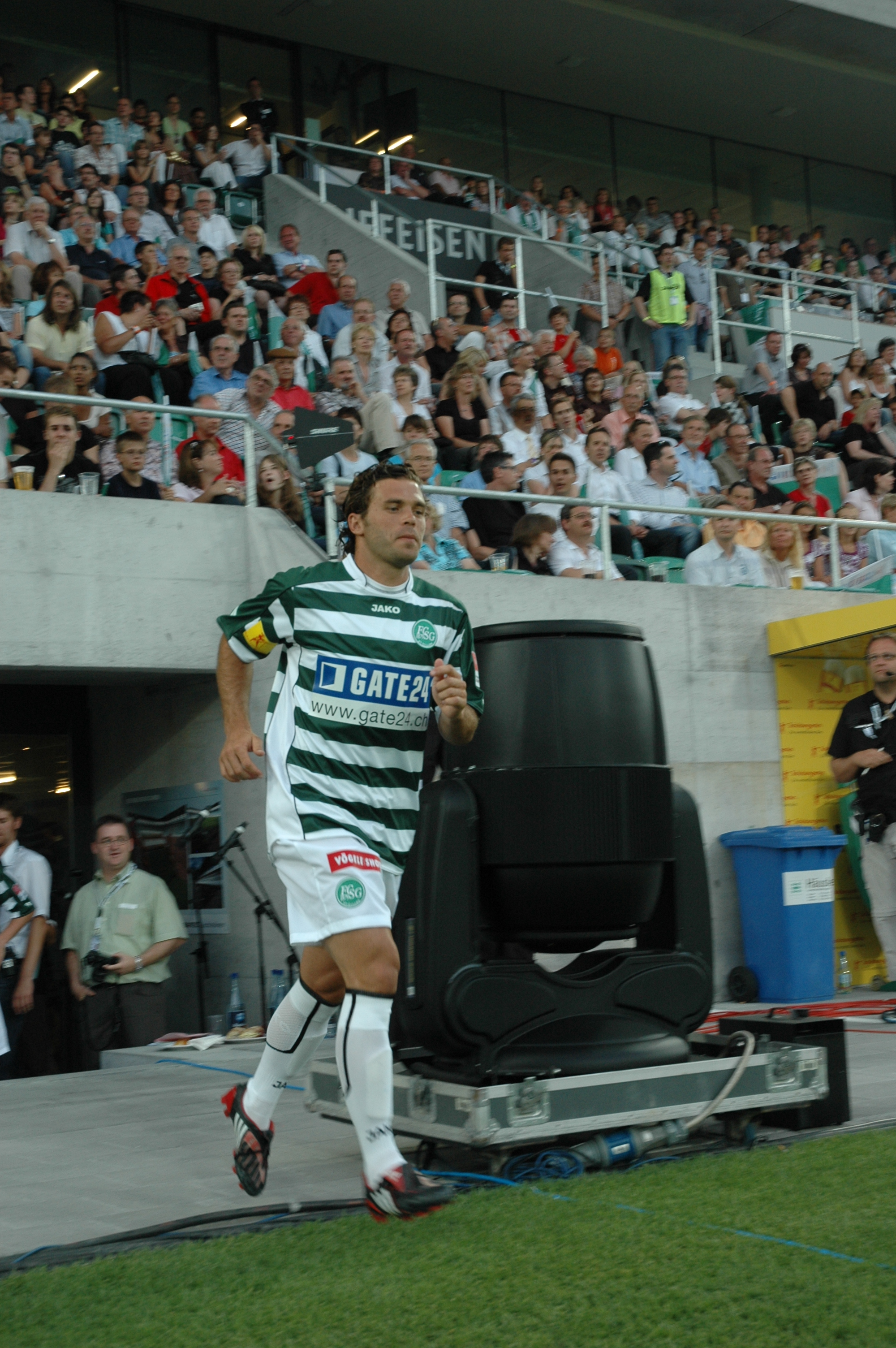
- Zé Vítor taking the field for St. Gallen in 2008

Personal information
- Full name: José Vítor Jardim Vieira
- Date of birth: 11 February 1982 (age 44)
- Place of birth: Funchal, Portugal
- Height: 1.76 m (5 ft 9 in)
- Position: Midfielder

Youth career
- 1990–1996: Marítimo
- 1996–1998: 1º Maio Funchal
- 1998–2000: Marítimo

Senior career*
Years	Team	Apps	(Gls)
2000–2003	Marítimo B	40	(0)
2002	→ Câmara Lobos (loan)	15	(1)
2003–2006	Machico		
2006–2008	Nacional	31	(4)
2008–2010	St. Gallen	64	(5)
2010–2011	AEL Limassol	25	(8)
2011–2012	Apollon Limassol	15	(1)
2012	Veria	7	(0)
2013	Enosis Neon	9	(0)
2013	União Madeira	12	(2)
2014	Nikos & Sokratis Erimis	11	(4)
2014–2016	Karmiotissa	38	(4)
2016–2017	ENY Digenis Ypsona	19	(2)
- * Club domestic league appearances and goals as of 12:28, 29 May 2016 (UTC)

José Vítor Jardim Vieira (born 11 February 1982), commonly known as Zé Vítor, is a Portuguese footballer who plays as a right midfielder.

== Football career ==
Born in Funchal, Madeira, Zé Vítor started playing professionally with C.S. Marítimo in his hometown, but never appeared officially for the first team, also being loaned to a third division club. He was definitely released in 2003, signing with another neighbouring side, A.D. Machico of the fourth level.

In the summer of 2006, Vítor joined C.D. Nacional – still in Madeira – making his Primeira Liga debut on 27 August by coming from the bench in a 0–1 away loss against former team Marítimo. He went on to appear in a further 30 league matches, leaving in the 2008 January transfer window to FC St. Gallen of Switzerland.

After suffering relegation in his first Swiss Super League season, Zé Vítor helped the club return to division one in the following year. He moved countries again in 2010, signing for AEL Limassol in Cyprus.
