= Hannu Tihinen =

Finnish footballer (born 1976)

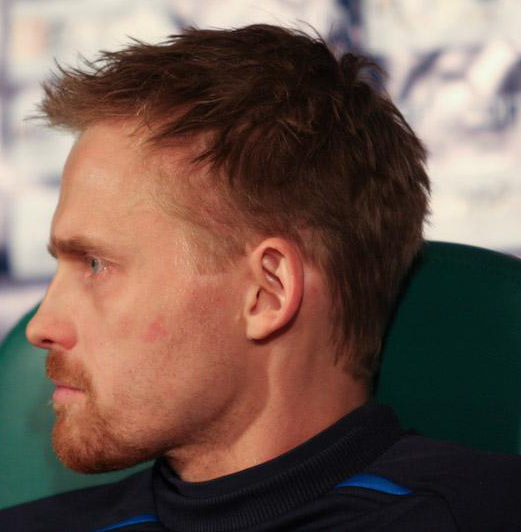

Personal information
- Date of birth: 1 July 1976 (age 50)
- Place of birth: Keminmaa, Finland
- Height: 1.90 m (6 ft 3 in)
- Position: Centre-back

Youth career
- 1991–1992: KePS

Senior career*
Years	Team	Apps	(Gls)
1993–1996	KePS	77	(12)
1997–1999	HJK Helsinki	65	(8)
2000–2002	Viking	71	(8)
2001	→ West Ham United (loan)	8	(0)
2002–2006	Anderlecht	101	(12)
2006–2010	Zürich	115	(9)
Total		438	(51)

International career
1999–2010	Finland	76	(5)
- * Club domestic league appearances and goals

Hannu Tihinen (born 1 July 1976) is a Finnish former professional footballer who played as a centre-back. Since January 2014, he worked as a technical director at the Football Association of Finland. In October 2022, Tihinen was appointed as an expert adviser of FIFA in Global Football Development Division High-Performance -unit.

He has played for clubs in Finland, Norway, England, Belgium and Switzerland. Tihinen achieved five championships in three countries in a career that ended in 2010, a cup title in two countries and captained almost all of his club teams.

== Club career ==
Born in Keminmaa, Lapland, Tihinen started his career with KePS in second-tier Ykkönen in 1993. After the 1996 season, the club was relegated to Kakkonen, and Tihinen joined Veikkausliiga club HJK for the 1997 season. He won both the Finnish championship and Finnish Cup once with HJK, and also earned UEFA Champions League experience with the club in the 1998–99 season.

Tihinen then joined Norwegian club Viking in November 1999. He scored a decisive own goal in the final of the Norwegian Cup in 2000 but won the Cup championship the following year and headed the goal into the right goal. Tihinen spent two and a half seasons with Viking, while also having a brief loan spell at West Ham United in the English Premiership. Whilst at West Ham, he played in their 1–0 victory over Manchester United at Old Trafford in the 2000–01 FA Cup, and was named the man of the match. After his loan deal ended, West Ham was willing to acquire Tihinen on a permanent contract for around £2 million, but Viking felt he was worth more and tried to raise the transfer fee to the point where the deal collapsed eventually, and Tihinen returned to Norway.

In 2002 Tihinen joined Belgian club Anderlecht for a €1.3 million transfer fee. He played in Belgium for four years, winning two Belgian championships. Tihinen scored the 1-0 winning goal against Lyon in the Champions League match in November 2003.

After Tihinen's contract with Anderlecht expired in the summer of 2006, he was snapped up by FC Zürich on a three-year deal. He was captain of the 2006–07 Swiss Championship and the 2008–09 Swiss Championship winning team. On 30 September 2009, Tihinen scored the winning goal for Zürich after ten minutes against A.C. Milan in the Group C game of the 2009–10 UEFA Champions League.

On 7 May 2010, Tihinen announced that he would retire after the 2009–10 season, mainly because of his head injuries. His last game was an away draw (3–3) against Neuchâtel Xamax on 16 May 2010.

== International career ==
Tihinen made his debut for the Finland national team on 5 June 1999 against Turkey. He scored five goals in the national team matches and formed Finland's regular central defensive pairing with Sami Hyypiä for most of the 2000s. Tihinen captained the national team in a match known as the eagle-owl match against Belgium in June 2007. In the match, an eagle-owl flew onto the field and the game was stopped for a while. The nickname Eagle-owls of the Finland national team originated from this event.

== Helmet ==
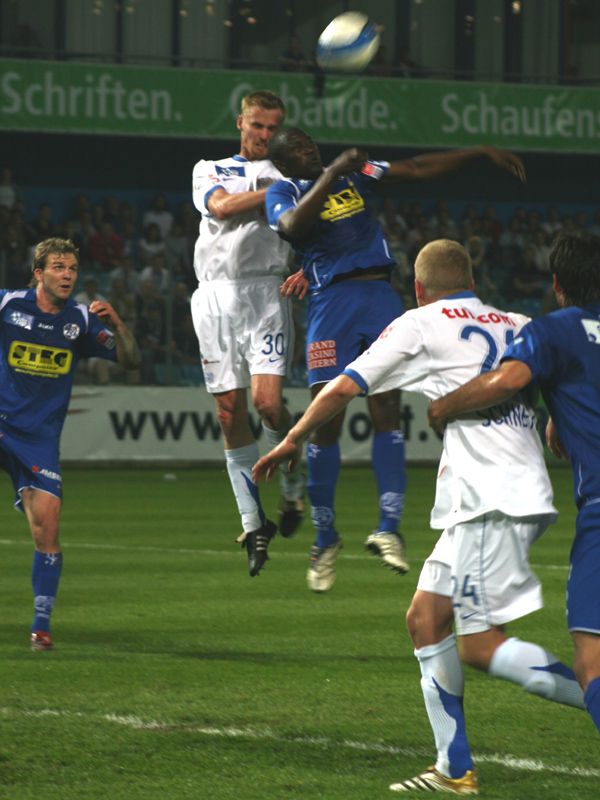
Tihinen playing for Zurich in a match against Luzern in 2007

Tihinen injured his head many times during his career. Because of that he wore a helmet during his last seasons. He was also very good with his head, which he used to score most of his goals.

== Post-playing career ==
After retiring, Tihinen joined FC Zürich as a deputy sports director.

On 13 April 2012, he announced his candidacy to run for the new president of the Football Association of Finland, as the post was left open after Sauli Niinistö was elected as President of Finland. In the years 2012–2014, Tihinen was the chairman of the Finnish Football Players´ Association.

After his career, Tihinen has studied international leadership and management at the UEFA Academy and at the Aalto University in Helsinki and since 2014, he has been the technical director of the Football Association of Finland. In October 2022, Tihinen was appointed as an expert adviser of FIFA in Global Football Development Division High-Performance -unit.

== Career statistics ==
=== Club ===
Appearances and goals by club, season and competition
Club	Season	League			Cup (Note: Includes Suomen Cup, Norwegian Cup, FA Cup, Belgian Cup and Swiss Cup)		Continental		Other		Total	
Club	Season	Division	Apps	Goals	Apps	Goals	Apps	Goals	Apps	Goals	Apps	Goals
KePS	1993	Ykkönen					—		—			
KePS	1994	Ykkönen					—		—			
KePS	1995	Ykkönen					—		—			
KePS	1996	Ykkönen					—		—			
KePS	Total		77	12			—		—		77	12
HJK	1997	Veikkausliiga	25	2	0	0	2 (Note: Includes UEFA Cup Winners' Cup)	0	0	0	27	2
HJK	1998	Veikkausliiga	13	2	0	0	8 (Note: Includes UEFA Champions League)	0	0	0	21	2
HJK	1999	Veikkausliiga	27	4	0	0	3 (Note: Includes UEFA Cup)	0	0	0	30	4
HJK	Total		65	8	0	0	13	0	0	0	78	8
Viking	2000	Tippeligaen	25	3	2	0	—		—		27	3
Viking	2001	Tippeligaen	26	1	2	1	6	1	—		34	3
Viking	2002	Tippeligaen	8	1	—		—		—		8	1
Viking	Total		59	5	4	1	6	1	0	0	69	7
West Ham United (loan)	2000–01	Premier League	8	0	2	0	—		0	0	10	0
Anderlecht	2002–03	Belgian First Division A	24	3	1	0	8	0	—		33	3
Anderlecht	2003–04	Belgian First Division A	29	2	6	2	10	1	—		45	5
Anderlecht	2004–05	Belgian First Division A	19	4	1	0	4	1	1 (Note: Includes Belgian Super Cup)	0	25	5
Anderlecht	2005–06	Belgian First Division A	29	3	1	0	10	1	—		40	4
Anderlecht	Total		101	12	9	2	32	3	1	0	143	17
Zürich	2006–07	Swiss Super League	32	4	5	0	2	0	—		39	4
Zürich	2007–08	Swiss Super League	27	2	4	2	7 (Note: Includes two appearances in UEFA Champions League and five appearances and one goal in UEFA Cup)	1	—		38	5
Zürich	2008–09	Swiss Super League	29	2	4	0	4	0	—		37	2
Zürich	2009–10	Swiss Super League	27	1	2	0	10	1	—		39	2
Zürich	Total		115	9	15	2	23	2	0	0	153	13
Career total			445	46	30	5	74	6	1	0	530	57

=== International ===
Scores and results list Finland’s goal tally first, score column indicates score after each Tihinen goal.

List of international goals scored by Hannu Tihinen
No.	Date	Venue	Opponent	Score	Result	Competition
1	5 June 1999	Helsinki, Finland	Turkey		2–4	UEFA Euro 2000 qualifying
2	15 August 2001	Helsinki, Finland	Belgium		4–1	Friendly
3	12 October 2002	Helsinki, Finland	Azerbaijan		3–0	UEFA Euro 2004 qualifying
4	7 September 2005	Tampere, Finland	Macedonia		5–1	2006 FIFA World Cup qualification
5	5 September 2009	Lankaran, Azerbaijan	Azerbaijan		2–1	2010 FIFA World Cup qualification

== Honours ==
HJK

- Veikkausliiga: 1997
- Finnish Cup: 1998
- Finnish League Cup: 1997, 1998
- The best defender of the Finnish Veikkausliiga 1999

Viking

- Norwegian Cup: 2001

Anderlecht

- Belgian First Division: 2003–04, 2005–06

Zürich

- Swiss Super League: 2007, 2009
- The best defender in the Swiss Axpo Super League 2009
