= Alexandre Alphonse =

French footballer and manager (born 1982)

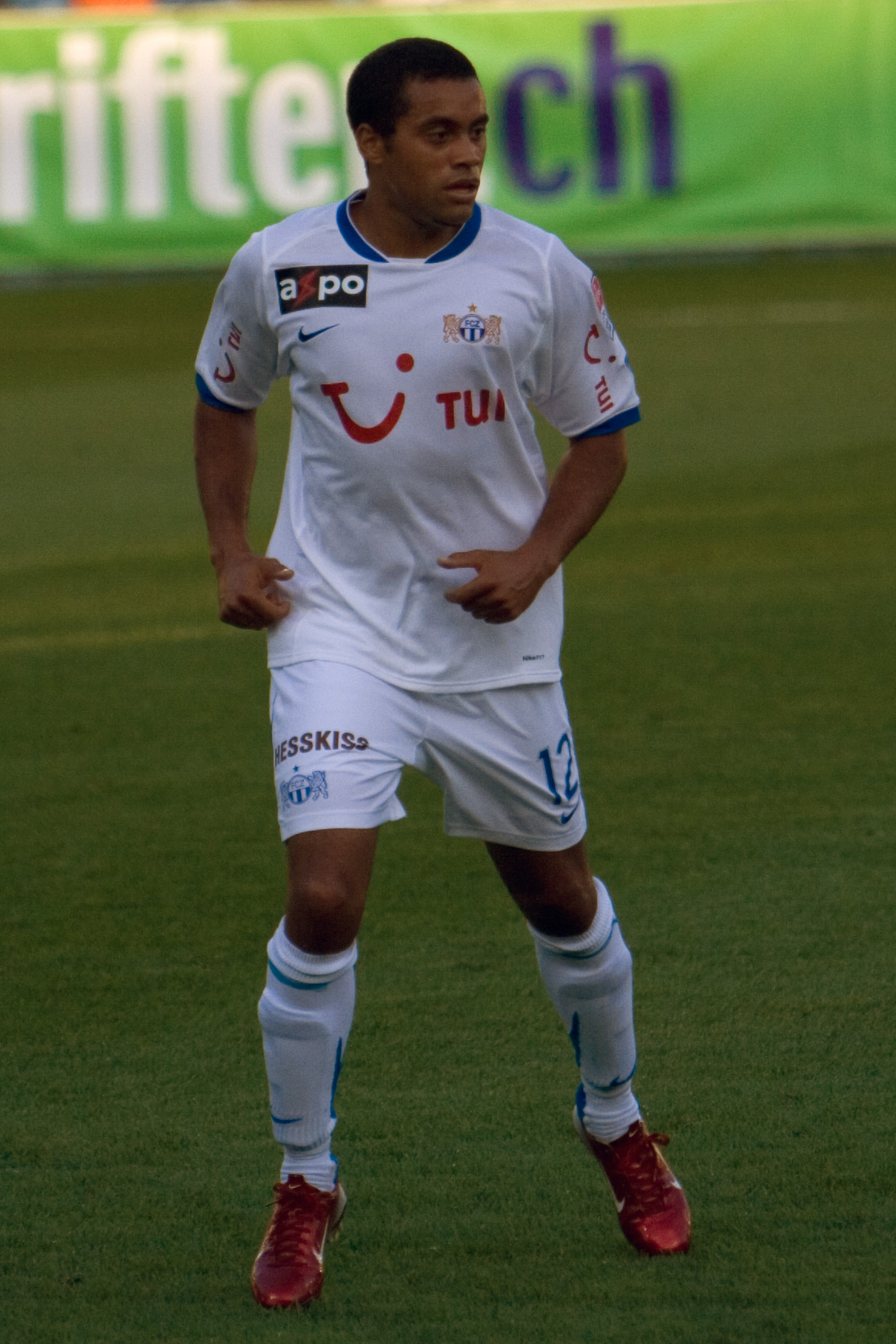

Personal information
- Date of birth: 17 June 1982 (age 44)
- Place of birth: Saint-Leu-la-Forêt, France
- Height: 1.74 m (5 ft 8 1/2 in)
- Position: Striker

Team information
- Current team: Servette U21 (assistant coach)

Senior career*
Years	Team	Apps	(Gls)
- Saint-Leu
2002–2003	Grenoble	20	(4)
2003–2004	Étoile Carouge	25	(19)
2004–2006	Chaux-de-Fonds	37	(17)
2006–2012	Zürich	165	(54)
2012–2016	Brest	87	(17)
2016–2019	Servette	74	(19)

International career
2009–2016	Guadeloupe	4	(1)

Managerial career
- 2019–: Servette U21 (assistant)
- * Club domestic league appearances and goals

Alexandre Alphonse (born 17 June 1982) is a football manager and former professional footballer who played as a striker. He represented Guadeloupe national team between 2009 and 2016. He currently works as an assistant coach in Switzerland with Servette U21.

== Club career ==
He was part of the 2005–06, 2006–07 and 2008–09 Swiss Championship-winning team FC Zürich.

He began his professional career in his home country of France in 2002 and the following season he moved to Switzerland, first to play for Etoile Carouge in 2003–04 then between 2004 and 2006 he played for La Chaux-de-Fonds. On 1 October 2005 he signed for FC Zürich.

Alphonse joined Ligue 1 side Stade Brestois 29 on a 2 1/2-year deal in January 2012.

== Honours ==
- Swiss Super League (3):
  - 2005–06, 2006–07, 2008–09
