= Silvan Aegerter =

Swiss footballer (born 1980)

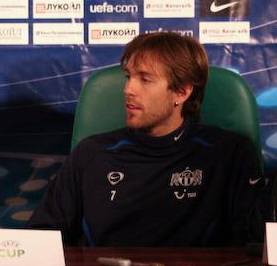

Personal information
- Full name: Silvan Aegerter
- Date of birth: 5 May 1980 (age 46)
- Place of birth: Grenchen, Switzerland
- Height: 1.80 m (5 ft 11 in)
- Position: Midfielder

Youth career
- 1988–1991: FC Wacker Grenchen
- 1991–2000: FC Grenchen
- 2000–2001: FC Basel U-21

Senior career*
Years	Team	Apps	(Gls)
2001–2007	FC Thun	154	(10)
2007–2012	FC Zürich	129	(12)
2012–2014	FC Lugano	32	(1)
2014	→ FC Münsingen (loan)	8	(0)
2014–2017	FC Münsingen	52	(1)
- * Club domestic league appearances and goals

Silvan Aegerter (born 5 May 1980,) is a former Swiss football midfielder.

== Club career ==
Before he played for FC Thun and FC Zürich. He played in the youth team for his local team FC Grenchen and also for FC Basel.

For FC Thun Aegerter played in the Champions League and the UEFA Cup. He was released by FC Thun in spring 2007 and a few days later signed a contract with FC Zürich until 20 June 2010, his latest contract was until 2012.
