= Xavier Margairaz =

Swiss footballer (born 1984)

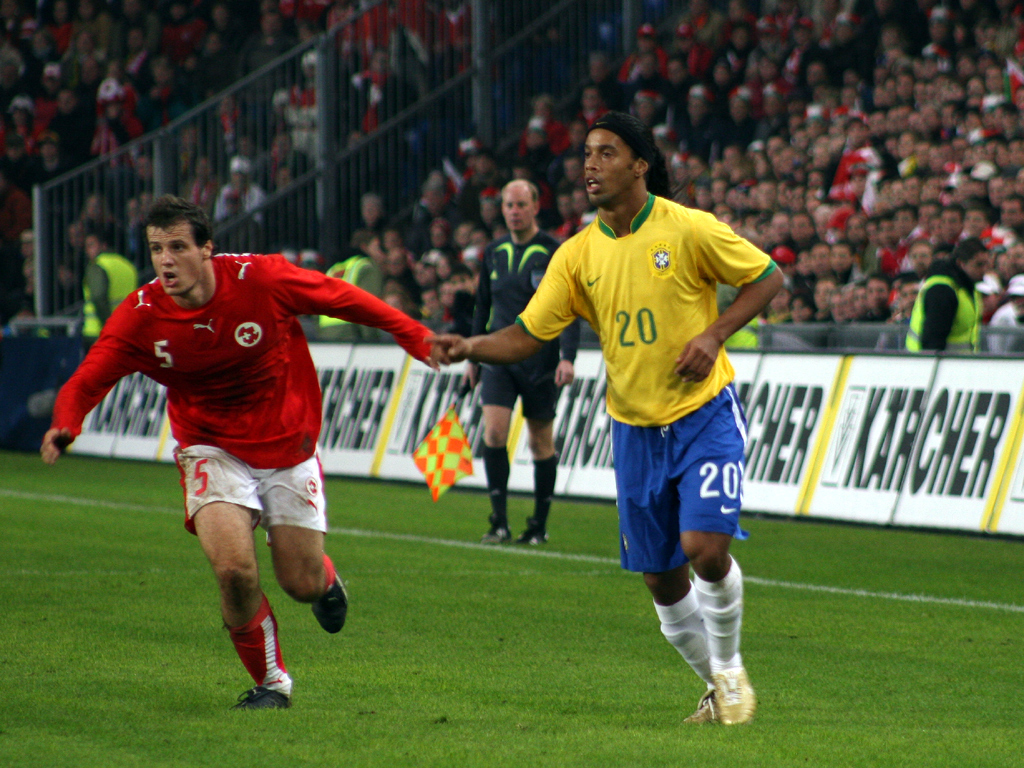
- Margairaz taking on Ronaldinho with Switzerland in 2006

Personal information
- Full name: Xavier Margairaz
- Date of birth: 7 January 1984 (age 42)
- Place of birth: Rances, Switzerland
- Height: 1.85 m (6 ft 1 in)
- Position: Midfielder

Youth career
- 1991–1996: Rances
- 1996–2000: Yverdon Sport

Senior career*
Years	Team	Apps	(Gls)
2000–2003	Lausanne-Sport	46	(3)
2003–2005	Neuchâtel Xamax	34	(5)
2005–2007	Zürich	78	(20)
2007–2009	Osasuna	13	(0)
2009	→ Zürich (loan)	13	(2)
2009–2012	Zürich	80	(16)
2012–2013	Sion	35	(5)
2014	Servette	10	(0)
2015–2017	Lausanne-Sport	53	(3)
Total		362	(54)

International career
2005–2010	Switzerland	18	(1)
- * Club domestic league appearances and goals

Xavier Margairaz (born 7 January 1984) is a Swiss former professional footballer who played as a midfielder.

== Club career ==
Margairaz was born in Rances. After beginning professionally with FC Lausanne-Sport and Neuchâtel Xamax, he was part of the 2005–06 and 2006–07 Super League-winning teams of Fussballclub Zürich.

In May 2007, Margairaz signed a three-year contract with Spanish side CA Osasuna, where he struggled with first-team opportunities. In late February 2008, in a friendly match with SD Eibar, he suffered a serious knee injury (anterior cruciate ligament, internal lateral ligament and external meniscus). After a successful surgery in Geneva, he missed UEFA Euro 2008 as his recovery process was estimated to be of at least eight months; this happened a week after another serious knee-injured central midfielder of the Navarrese club, Javad Nekounam, began training.

On 14 January 2009, Margairaz moved back to FC Zürich on loan until the end of the season. In June, after he helped the team to another league title and Osasuna received €400.000, the move was made permanent.

On 15 September 2009, Margairaz became Zürich's first scorer in the UEFA Champions League, netting in a 2–5 home loss against Real Madrid in the group stage. In January 2012, he moved to FC Sion on a three-and-a-half-year contract, leaving in June of the following year.

== International career ==
A member of the Swiss national team since 2005, Margairaz was called up to the 2006 FIFA World Cup, where he had two late substitute appearances.

== Personal life ==
Margairaz's older brother, Sascha, was also a footballer. He played mainly in the lower leagues and amateur football.

== Honours ==
Zürich

- Swiss Super League: 2005–06, 2006–07, 2008–09
- Swiss Cup: 2004–05
