= Milan Gajić (footballer, born 1986) =

Serbian footballer

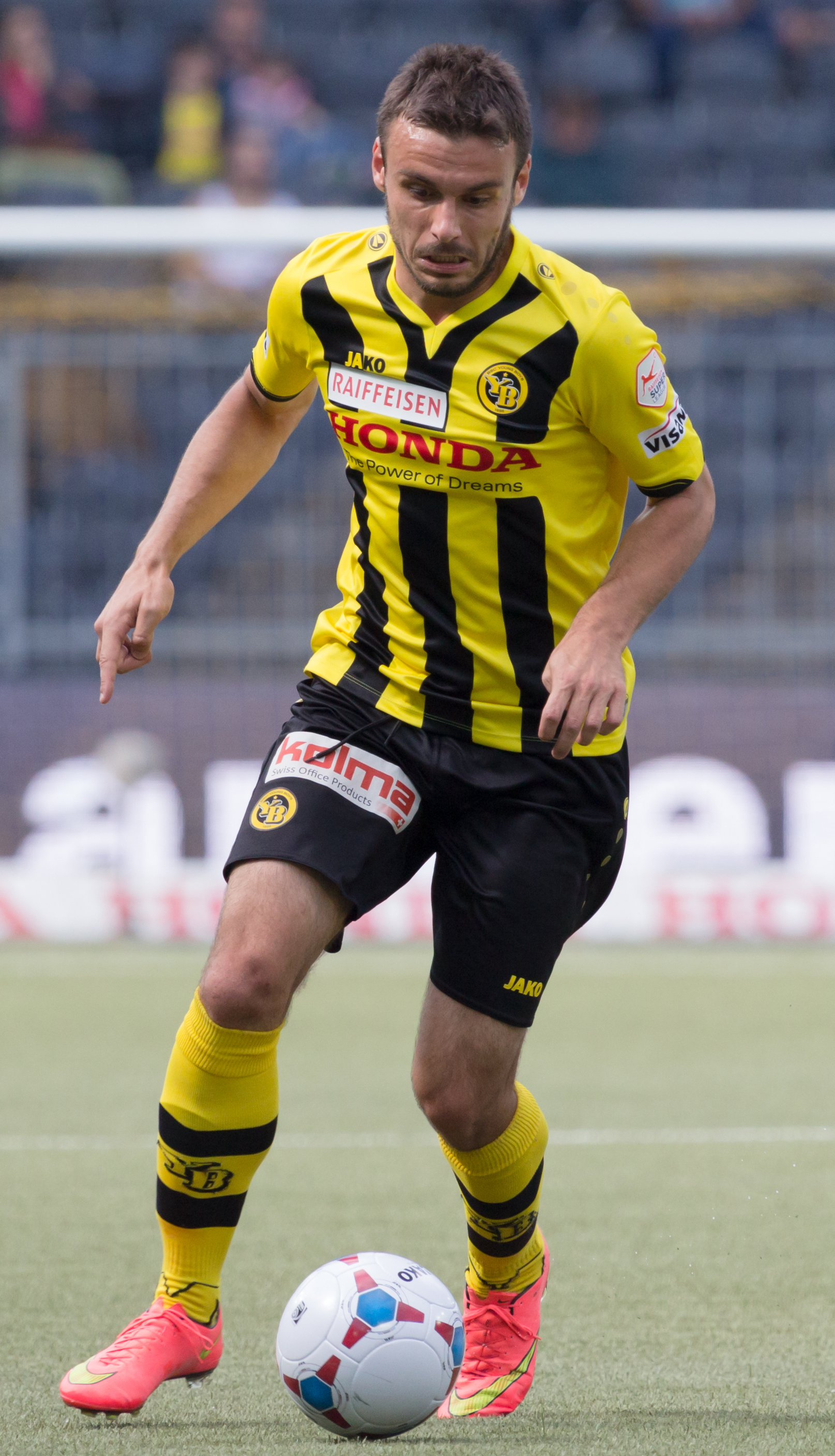
- Gajić with Young Boys in 2014

Personal information
- Date of birth: 17 November 1986 (age 39)
- Place of birth: Kruševac, SFR Yugoslavia
- Height: 1.82 m (5 ft 11 1/2 in)
- Position: Attacking midfielder

Youth career
- Župa Aleksandrovac
- Napredak Kruševac

Senior career*
Years	Team	Apps	(Gls)
2006–2008	Napredak Kruševac	51	(11)
2007	→ Boavista (loan)	3	(0)
2008–2009	Luzern	23	(3)
2009–2013	Zürich	63	(7)
2011	→ Grasshoppers (loan)	7	(0)
2013–2017	Young Boys	90	(10)
2017–2024	Vaduz	176	(22)
- * Club domestic league appearances and goals

Milan Gajić (Serbian Cyrillic: Милан Гајић; born 17 November 1986) is a Serbian former professional footballer who played as an attacking midfielder.

== Career ==
Gajić started his professional career with Napredak Kruševac, together with Predrag Pavlović and Nikola Mitrović. He was also loaned to Boavista in the fall of 2007.

In July 2008, Gajić signed a contract with Luzern. He scored three goals in 23 league appearances in the 2008–09 season.

On 5 May 2009, Gajić signed a four-year contract with Zürich. He scored the opener in a 1–1 home draw with Milan on 8 December 2009. In the 2011 winter transfer window, Gajić was loaned to Grasshoppers.

In the summer of 2013, Gajić signed a contract with Young Boys.

On 14 May 2024, FC Vaduz announced his retirement from professional football. He was playing for the Liechtensteiner club for seven years, from 2017 until 2024, featuring in over 200 games.

== Honours ==
FC Vaduz

- Liechtenstein Football Cup (2): 2017-18, 2018-19
