= 2009–10 Swiss Super League =

113th season of top-tier Swiss football

Swiss Super League
- Season: 2009–10
- Dates: 11 July 2009 – 16 May 2010
- Champions: Basel; 13th title
- Relegated: Aarau
- Champions League: Basel; Young Boys
- Europa League: Grasshopper; Luzern; Lausanne-Sport (via domestic cup)
- Matches: 182
- Goals: 602 (3.31 per match)
- Top goalscorer: Seydou Doumbia (30 goals)
- Biggest home win: Grasshoppers 7–0 Bellinzona
- Biggest away win: Bellinzona 1–7 YB
- Highest scoring: Luzern 4–5 Basel

The 2009–10 Swiss Super League was the 113th season of top-tier football in Switzerland. The competition was officially named AXPO Super League due to sponsoring purposes. It began on 11 July 2009 and ended in May 2010. FC Zürich were the defending champions. The title was won by FC Basel.

== Promotion and relegation ==
Liechtenstein side FC Vaduz were relegated after finishing in 10th and last place in 2008–09 Swiss Super League. They were replaced by Challenge League 2008–09 champions FC St. Gallen.

9th-placed FC Luzern and Challenge League runners-up FC Lugano competed in a two-legged relegation play-off after the end of the 2008–09 season. Lucerne won 5–1 aggregate and thus remained in Super League .

== Stadia and locations ==
Location of teams in the 2009–10 Swiss Super League

| Club | Location | Stadium | Capacity |
|---|---|---|---|
| FC Aarau | Aarau | Stadion Brügglifeld | 9,249 |
| FC Basel | Basel | St. Jakob-Park | 42,500 |
| AC Bellinzona | Bellinzona | Stadio Comunale Bellinzona | 8,740 |
| Grasshopper Club Zürich | Zürich | Letzigrund | 23,605 |
| FC Luzern | Luzern | Stadion Allmend | 13,000 |
| Neuchâtel Xamax | Neuchâtel | Stade de la Maladière | 12,000 |
| FC Sion | Sion | Stade Tourbillon | 16,500 |
| FC St. Gallen | St. Gallen | AFG Arena | 19,694 |
| BSC Young Boys | Bern | Wankdorf | 31,783 |
| FC Zürich | Zürich | Letzigrund | 23,605 |

== League table ==
| Pos | Team | Pld | W | D | L | GF | GA | GD | Pts | Qualification or relegation |
|---|---|---|---|---|---|---|---|---|---|---|
| 1 | Basel (C) | 36 | 25 | 5 | 6 | 90 | 46 | +44 | 80 | Qualification to Champions League third qualifying round |
| 2 | Young Boys | 36 | 25 | 2 | 9 | 78 | 47 | +31 | 77 | Qualification to Champions League third qualifying round |
| 3 | Grasshopper | 36 | 21 | 2 | 13 | 65 | 43 | +22 | 65 | Qualification to Europa League play-off round (Note: Basel, who have already qualified for the 2010–11 UEFA Champions League, played Challenge League side Lausanne-Sport in the 2009–10 Swiss Cup final. Basel have won the cup, thus 3rd-placed team will qualify for the play-off round and the 4th-placed team will be inserted into the third qualifying round of the UEFA Europa League and Lausanne-Sport will be inserted into the 2010–11 UEFA Europa League 2nd qualifying round.) |
| 4 | Luzern | 36 | 17 | 7 | 12 | 66 | 55 | +11 | 58 | Qualification to Europa League third qualifying round |
| 5 | Sion | 36 | 14 | 9 | 13 | 63 | 57 | +6 | 51 | |
| 6 | St. Gallen | 36 | 13 | 7 | 16 | 53 | 56 | −3 | 46 | |
| 7 | Zürich | 36 | 12 | 9 | 15 | 55 | 58 | −3 | 45 | |
| 8 | Neuchâtel Xamax | 36 | 11 | 8 | 17 | 55 | 57 | −2 | 41 | |
| 9 | Bellinzona (O) | 36 | 7 | 4 | 25 | 42 | 92 | −50 | 25 | Qualification to relegation play-offs |
| 10 | Aarau (R) | 36 | 6 | 5 | 25 | 32 | 88 | −56 | 23 | Relegation to Swiss Challenge League |

Source: axposuperleague.ch (in German)
Rules for classification: 1) points; 2) goal difference; 3) number of goals scored.
(C) Champions; (O) Play-off winners; (R) Relegated

== Results ==
Teams play each other four times in this league. In the first half of the season each team played every other team twice (home and away) and then do the same in the second half of the season.

=== First half of season ===
| Home \ Away | AAR | BAS | BEL | GCZ | LUZ | NX | SIO | STG | YB | ZÜR |
|---|---|---|---|---|---|---|---|---|---|---|
| Aarau | | 0–2 | 1–2 | 1–0 | 2–4 | 0–4 | 0–0 | 0–2 | 0–3 | 1–1 |
| Basel | 2–1 | | 3–2 | 3–1 | 1–1 | 4–1 | 5–0 | 4–0 | 1–2 | 1–1 |
| Bellinzona | 4–1 | 2–3 | | 0–0 | 1–2 | 1–1 | 3–1 | 0–5 | 1–7 | 3–2 |
| Grasshopper | 4–0 | 3–1 | 7–0 | | 0–0 | 1–3 | 3–1 | 1–3 | 2–1 | 1–0 |
| Luzern | 6–0 | 4–5 | 2–0 | 2–1 | | 2–1 | 1–2 | 3–1 | 1–2 | 1–0 |
| Neuchâtel Xamax | 3–3 | 2–2 | 4–1 | 0–1 | 1–1 | | 1–3 | 4–2 | 3–0 | 3–0 |
| Sion | 1–1 | 1–2 | 3–1 | 2–3 | 3–1 | 1–0 | | 2–1 | 3–1 | 3–3 |
| St. Gallen | 1–0 | 2–0 | 1–1 | 1–0 | 1–1 | 1–1 | 1–1 | | 2–3 | 1–3 |
| Young Boys | 4–0 | 2–0 | 4–2 | 2–0 | 1–1 | 1–0 | 3–1 | 1–1 | | 3–0 |
| Zürich | 2–0 | 2–2 | 4–1 | 4–3 | 4–0 | 1–2 | 1–1 | 1–0 | 2–3 | |

Source: Swiss Football League
Legend: Blue = home team win; Yellow = draw; Red = away team win.

=== Second half of season ===
| Home \ Away | AAR | BAS | BEL | GCZ | LUZ | NX | SIO | STG | YB | ZÜR |
|---|---|---|---|---|---|---|---|---|---|---|
| Aarau | | 0–3 | 6–3 | 1–4 | 1–2 | 1–0 | 0–3 | 2–0 | 1–5 | 1–3 |
| Basel | 2–1 | | 4–0 | 1–2 | 5–0 | 3–0 | 4–3 | 3–2 | 4–0 | 4–1 |
| Bellinzona | 1–2 | 0–2 | | 1–2 | 0–0 | 3–2 | 2–1 | 0–2 | 1–3 | 1–4 |
| Grasshopper | 2–0 | 4–0 | 2–0 | | 0–1 | 2–1 | 2–0 | 2–1 | 2–1 | 4–0 |
| Luzern | 4–0 | 0–1 | 2–1 | 4–2 | | 2–1 | 1–1 | 2–3 | 5–1 | 4–1 |
| Neuchâtel Xamax | 2–1 | 1–3 | 2–0 | 0–1 | 1–2 | | 4–1 | 0–3 | 1–0 | 3–3 |
| Sion | 4–0 | 2–2 | 2–1 | 1–0 | 5–2 | 1–1 | | 5–1 | 4–1 | 1–1 |
| St. Gallen | 2–2 | 2–4 | 1–2 | 0–1 | 3–1 | 2–1 | 1–0 | | 1–2 | 1–0 |
| Young Boys | 3–1 | 0–2 | 2–1 | 4–0 | 2–1 | 4–1 | 1–0 | 2–1 | | 2–1 |
| Zürich | 0–1 | 1–2 | 2–0 | 3–2 | 1–0 | 0–0 | 2–0 | 1–1 | 0–2 | |

Source: Swiss Football League
Legend: Blue = home team win; Yellow = draw; Red = away team win.

== Relegation play-offs ==
AC Bellinzona as 9th-placed team of the Super League played a two-legged play-off against Challenge League runners-up AC Lugano.

21 May 2010
20:15 CEST

| Bellinzona | 2–1 | Lugano |
|---|---|---|
| Mihoubi 27'; Feltscher 90+1' | Report (in Italian) | Montandon 70'; Preisig (red card) 78' |

Stadio Comunale Bellinzona, Bellinzona
Attendance: 5,400
Referee: Jérôme Laperrière

24 May 2010
16:00 CEST

| Lugano | 0–0 | Bellinzona |
|---|---|---|
| | Report (in Italian) |

Cornaredo Stadium, Lugano
Attendance: 6,500
Referee: Claudio Circhetta

Bellinzona won 2–1 on aggregate.

== Top goalscorers ==
Updated on 16 May 2010; Source: Swiss Football League (in German)

| Rank | Player | Club | Goals |
|---|---|---|---|
| 1 | (Ivory Coast) Seydou Doumbia | BSC Young Boys | 30 |
| 2 | (Switzerland) Marco Streller | FC Basel | 21 |
| 2 | (Romania) Cristian Florin Ianu | FC Luzern | 21 |
| 2 | (Belgium) Émile Mpenza | FC Sion | 21 |
| 5 | (Switzerland) Alexander Frei | FC Basel | 15 |
| 6 | (Switzerland) Moreno Costanzo | FC St. Gallen | 14 |
| 6 | (Argentina) Gonzalo Zarate | Grasshopper Club Zürich | 14 |
| 8 | (Australia) Scott Chipperfield | FC Basel | 13 |
| 9 | (Nigeria) Ideye Aide Brown | Neuchâtel Xamax | 12 |
| 9 | (Switzerland) Valentin Stocker | FC Basel | 12 |

== Attendances ==
| # | Club | Average |
|---|---|---|
| 1 | Basel | 23,656 |
| 2 | Young Boys | 22,653 |
| 3 | St. Gallen | 14,083 |
| 4 | Sion | 10,761 |
| 5 | Zürich | 10,700 |
| 6 | Luzern | 7,551 |
| 7 | GCZ | 6,778 |
| 8 | Aarau | 5,842 |
| 9 | Xamax | 5,270 |
| 10 | Bellinzona | 3,298 |
