= 2011–12 FC Basel season =

FC Basel
2011–12 season
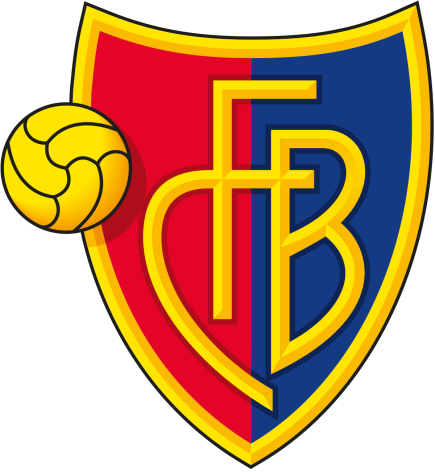
- Chairman: Gisela Oeri until 16 January 2012; Bernhard Heusler from 16 January 2012
- Manager: Thorsten Fink until 13 October 2011; Heiko Vogel from 13 October 2011
- Ground: St. Jakob-Park
- Swiss Super League: 1st (champions)
- Swiss Cup: Winners
- UEFA Champions League: Round of 16
- Top goalscorer: League: Alexander Frei (24); All: Alexander Frei (33)
- Highest home attendance: Swiss Super League: 36,000 vs. Lausanne-Sport (29 April 2012); 36,000 vs. Young Boys (23 May 2012); Champions League: 36,894 vs. Manchester United (7 December 2011)
- Lowest home attendance: Swiss Super League: 25,762 vs. Sion (5 February 2012); Swiss Cup: 8,028 vs. Lausanne-Sport (21 March 2012)
Home colours	Away colours	Third colours

The 2011–12 season is FC Basel's 119th in existence and the club's 18th consecutive season in the top flight of Swiss football. FC Basel started their season with various warm-up matches against teams from Switzerland, Germany, Georgia, France and Romania and played against Hertha BSC and West Ham United at the 2011 Uhrencup in Grenchen. This season, Basel earned the so-called "Title Hattrick", that is, three consecutive Swiss Super League championships. They won the Swiss Cup after defeating FC Luzern in the final, and reached the knockout phase of the Champions League, losing to the eventual finalists Bayern Munich 1–7 on aggregate.

== Club ==
=== FC Basel Holding AG ===
The FC Basel Holding AG (Holding) owns 75% of the club FC Basel (FC Basel 1893 AG) and the other 25% is owned by the club and its members. Chairwoman of the Holding was Gisela Oeri. She owned 91.96% of the Holding's shares. The other 8.04% of the shares were owned by a group of investors, these being Manor AG, J. Safra Sarasin, Novasearch AG, MCH Group AG and Weitnauer Holding AG. As chairwoman of the holding, Oeri was also chairwoman of the club. At the AGM, Oeri announced that she was stepping down from her position of presiding the club. She handed her shares over to her vice chairman Bernhard Heusler, the finance chief Stephan Werthmüller and Sportdirector Georg Heitz.

=== Club management ===
In the beginning of the season, the club's board of directors remained unchanged from the previous season. Then at the club's Extraordinary General Assembly on 16 January 2012 the 601 attending members confirmed these three directors in their positions and Adrian Knup joined them to become new vice chairman. They also appointed Oeri as honorary president.

Chairman	(Switzerland) Mrs Gisela Oeri until 16 January 2012
Chairman	(Switzerland) Mr Bernhard Heusler from 16 January 2012
Vice Chairman	(Switzerland) Mr Bernhard Heusler until 16 January 2012
Vice Chairman	(Switzerland) Mr Adrian Knup from 16 January 2012
Ground (capacity and dimensions)	St. Jakob-Park (38,512) (37,500 for international matches / 120x80 m)

Source: Official Site

=== Team management ===
Position	Staff
Manager	(Germany) Thorsten Fink until 13 October 2011
Manager	(Germany) Heiko Vogel from 13 October 2011
Assistant manager	(Germany) Heiko Vogel until 13 October 2011
Assistant manager	(Austria) Markus Hoffmann from 6 January 2012
Fitness Coach	(Croatia) Nikola Vidović
Conditioning Coach	(Switzerland) Marco Walker
Goalkeeper Coach	(Switzerland) Romain Crevoisier
Technology and analysis	(Scotland) Nnamdi Aghanya
Team Administration	(Switzerland) Gustav Nussbaumer
Youth Team Coach	(Switzerland) Patrick Rahmen until 13 October 2011
Youth Team Co-Coach	(Switzerland) Sandro Kamber

Last updated: 6 January 2012

== Overview ==
At the beginning of the season the German Thorsten Fink remained head-coach. It was to be his third consecutive season. His assistant was Heiko Vogel and fitness coach was Nikola Vidović. Fink brought three youngsters up from the U-21 team, being Arlind Ajeti, Roman Buess and Darko Jevtić. Two players returned after spending the previous season on loan, these were Fabian Frei after his loan to St. Gallen and Pascal Schürpf returned from Lugano. There were also a number of transfers, Radoslav Kováč came from West Ham United, Park Joo-ho transferred in from Júbilo Iwata, Pak Kwang-ryong from Wil and Stephan Andrist signed in from Thun. Two players signed in on free transfers, these being Kay Voser and Marcel Herzog.

At the end of the previous season the club did not renew the contracts with four players, who then had to leave. These were Beg Ferati, Behrang Safari, Matthias Baron and Dominik Ritter. Orhan Mustafi transferred to Grasshopper Club and Sandro Wieser transferred to 1899 Hoffenheim. Three players were loaned out to obtain more playing time, Fwayo Tembo to ES Sahel, Pascal Schürpf to Aarau and Taulant Xhaka to Grasshopper Club.

Another player who left the club was their captain and goalkeeper Franco Costanzo. Costanzo played for FC Basel for five years, in which time they won the Swiss Cup three times and the national Championship also three times. He also played twice in the Champions League group-stages. During this period, he played 141 league games, including cup and international UEFA games he had 199 club appearances. He played his last match for the team on 25 May 2011 and was substituted out in the 87th minute to a standing ovation. He was replaced by his designated successor Yann Sommer.

Head coach Thorsten Fink left the club and on 13 October he signed a contract with Hamburger SV to manage the German Bundesliga club through to 2014. Fink took the coach of Basel's U-21 team Patrick Rahmen with him as his assistant. As replacement for Fink, the club chose his former assistant Vogel, who served as caretaker manager until the winter break. Vogel's first three games in charge of the team were the Swiss Cup fixture on 15 October, a 5–1 away win against FC Schötz, the Champions League Group C fixture on 18 October 2011, a 0–2 home defeat against Benfica, and a 1–0 away win in the Super League against FC Zürich. On 7 December 2011, he guided Basel to the round of 16 in the Champions League, defeating the 2011 runners-up Manchester United 2–1. After 11 games, four of which in the Champions League, with eight wins, two draws and only one defeat, it was announced on 12 December that Vogel had signed as head coach and manager. A few days later, it was also announced that Markus Hoffmann had been signed as an assistant.

On 31 August 2011, Liverpool had announced the release of Philipp Degen following his long-term calf injury. Just a short time later, he made the request to the then Basel manager Fink if he could keep fit with his home club's first team, which was granted. Fink left the club and his replacement Heiko Vogel offered Degen a contract which Degen signed on 20 November 2011.

== The Campaign ==
=== Domestic league ===
Basel entered the 2011–12 Swiss Super League as defending champions, saving their one-point margin on FC Zürich by winning 3–0 against FC Luzern on the last day of the 2010–11 Swiss Super League. They began their season on 16 July in Bern against Young Boys. The start of the season was poor, with three draws and two defeats in the first six league matches. The team refound their strengths and things changed to the better. Basel then won ten and drew the other two of the next 12 games. The first half of the domestic season ended on 11 December with the home match against Neuchâtel Xamax. To this point, Basel remained as League leaders.

Basel continued their undefeated run in the domestic season and equaled the Swiss record of longest undefeated run (26 games) in the Swiss league (previously held by Grasshoppers) ironically by beating Grasshoppers 6–3 on 12 May 2012. Although they could not surpass the record, they still managed to defend their Super League title despite losing to Young Boys 2–1 on the final day of the season. As they have done in previous seasons, the title win was celebrated at Barfüsserplatz later that night. After retaining first place, Basel will enter the 2012–13 UEFA Champions League in the second round of qualification.

Conclusion

The team achieved their aim by winning the championship. The team ended the season with 78 goals scored and 33 goals against. They had the season's best attacking record and the second best defensive record. Alexander Frei was the team's top goal scorer with 24 goals and achieved his personal aim to become league top goal-scorer for the second consecutive year. Marco Streller was the team's second top scorer with 13 goals and he was also second in the league ranking. Third best scorer in the team was Xherdan Shaqiri with nine goals. He was third equal in the league ranking, together with Emmanuel Mayuka from the Young Boys, Vilmos Vanczák from FC Sion and Matías Vitkieviez who played for both Servette and YB. Jacques Zoua had scored seven league goals and Fabian Frei, Benjamin Huggel and Valentin Stocker had each scored four.

=== Domestic cup ===
Basel entered the 2011–12 Swiss Cup in the first round of the competition and the team's clear aim was to win the title. In the first round, teams from the Super League and Challenge League were seeded and could not play against each other. In a match, the home advantage was granted to the team from the lower league, if applicable.

Eschenbach (14 September 2011)

In the first round Basel were drawn against Amateur team FC Eschenbach, who at that time played in the 2. Liga, the fourth tier of Swiss football. The match was played in the Sportplatz Weiherhaus in Eschenbach LU with an attendance of 3,700 spectators. Head coach Thorsten Fink had mixed a number of their youngsters into the team, leaving a number of the regular players at home with a day-off. Although the hosts had the first shot at goal in the first minute, Basel started well, despite having difficulties with the poor condition of the pitch. It lasted only a few minutes before the inevitable occurred, following a long corner from Scott Chipperfield in the 11th minute Benjamin Huggel headed the ball back into the middle and Pak Kwang-Ryong scored his first goal for club. Basel dominated their opponents from then onwards, Stephan Andrist drove a long drive wide and then Jacques Zoua put the ball into the net, but was ruled off-side. In the 36th minute a fine cross from the left found Pak in the middle and his header put the favourites two up. In the following minutes the Eschenbach goalkeeper Amhof had to make a number of saves. To make things worse for him, in the 45th minute he committed a foul on Zoua as he came out too late and the fouled player himself sank the penalty-kick. In the second half Basel spooled the game out and Chipperfield added to the score, but the hosts were unable to achieve a consolation goal. The favourites won 4–0 to qualify for the next round.

Schötz (15 October 2011)

In the second round of the Cup the teams from the Super League were seeded and could not play each other. In the matches the home advantage was granted to the team from the lower league. Basel were drawn against Schötz. Schötz itself is just a small village with about 4,000 inhabitants, but the football club has written its name into the history of the competition before by beating bigger clubs many times before. An attendance of 2,800 visited the Sportplatz Wissenhusen, but the same the guests dominate play from the opening minutes. Stephan Andrist put his name on the score sheet after just 8 minutes and Benjamin Huggel doubled up on 34 minutes. In the 57th minute Andrist achieved his second and in the 79th Jacques Zoua scored Basel's fourth. In the 84th minute Schötz's right winger Koch achieved the consolation goal, but Basel's substitute Alexander Frei netted in the last minute of the game as Basel won 4–0 to qualify for the next round.

Wil (26 November 2011)

In the third round, the ties were drawn, there was no seeding, everyone could meet everyone. The home advantage was granted to the team from the lower league, otherwise to the team that was drawn first. Basel were drawn at away against Wil from the Challenge League. The match was played at the Stadion Bergholz in front of 4,400 spectators. Basel's head coach Thorsten Fink had given David Abraham, Benjamin Huggel and Marco Streller a free week-end, but the newly signed Philipp Degen was on the bench, ready to make his comeback. Even without these regular players in their starting line-up, Basel started well and in 8th minute after a short-played corner kick, Granit Xhaka played a cross into the centre and Fabian Frei ran into the space jumped high and headed his team into the lead. Basel dominated the game in the first half, a long range shot from the forwards moving defender Markus Steinhöfer was punched out by keeper Guillaume Faivre. As the second half began the hosts took over the game, created chances but were not successful. In the 60th minute a long ball into the Basel penalty area, from a quickly played free-kick for Wil and suddenly the attacking mid-fielder Sandro Lombardi collected the ball and was able to challenge Basel keeper Yann Sommer. However, the keeper felled the on running player and subsequently the whistle, and he was shown the red card, and the penalty was given. Granit Xhaka was called out and second keeper Massimo Colomba was substituted in before the penalty-kick could be taken. Džengis Čavušević took the spot-kick, but failed as Colomba reacted well and parried, to cause frustration for Čavušević. Basel had another good chance, but Jacques Zoua kicked his shot against the cross bar. Wil did not give up and in the 84th minute a long ball was not cleared by the Basel defence, Lombardi caught the loose ball and equalised with a low shot. The game went into extra time and Philipp Degen gave his comeback. In the 111th minute, the afore mentioned Čavušević, with a sly one-two pass, was played clear and he put the hosts a goal up. His frustration was relieved. However, two minutes later a free kick taken by Alexander Frei flew high into the goal mouth and was headed away, but not cleared. Degen controlled the loose ball and shot left footed beyond everybody in front of him into the goal for the 2–2 equaliser. Again a few minutes later, Park Joo-Ho's quick ball to Scott Chipperfield was sent on to Alex Frei, who lifted the ball over advancing keeper Faivre to give Basel the lead. In the last minute of the game the frustration was again great and players from both sides were involved in a scuffle and a number of players were pushed onto the ground. Basel's Genséric Kusunga and Wil's Čavušević were both shown the straight red card, but the result remained with Basel's 3–2 away win.

Lausanne-Sport (21 March 2012)

The winners of Round 3 played in the quarter-finals and the ties were drawn, there is no home advantage granted in the draw. Basel were drawn at home in the St. Jakob-Park against Lausanne-Sport. Referee was Cyril Zimmermann, the match attendance was 8,028 people and the pitch was brand new, it had been laid during the previous fortnight. The start phase was extremely dishevelled, with many bad passes and build-up errors. The first good move was in the 24th minute, a good diagonal ball to Valentin Stocker who advanced down the left and flanked towards Marco Streller. Lausanne defender Guillaume Katz tried to interrupt the play, but he steered the ball passed his own goalkeeper Anthony Favre. Basel then tried to double up, a good chance for Markus Steinhöfer, but his shot was slightly too high. Suddenly a long cross from the Lausanne right-back Abdelouahed Chakhsi and Jocelyn Roux headed the surprise equaliser just seconds before half-time. After the break Basel again dominated play, Philipp Degen with a long cross from the right towards the far post to captain Streller and his first-time left foot volley rocketed into the net. The guests now seemed uncertain and a left footed shot from Xherdan Shaqiri and as Streller tried to win the loose ball he was brought down. Alexander Frei converted the spot-kick. Lausanne didn't seem to have much to put against the home team, but then, after a clearance and a good ball into the centre and good pass out to the right and a good pass back. Basel's defence were not in contact with the play. Roux said thank you and put the ball into the net, 3–2. The Basel team pulled themselves together, played with more tempo and created further chances and a long distance left footed shot from Streller scraped the cross bar. In the 89th minute Frei laid the ball off for Gilles Yapi who outplayed the oncoming goalkeeper and played into the middle, Streller side footed the ball into the unguarded net. Lausanne had held on well, but in the later stages had run out of stamina. In the second minute of added time Fabian Frei added the fifth. Basel won 5–2 and qualified for the semi-final.

Winterthur (15 April 2012)

Basel's opponents in the semi-final were lower tier FC Winterthur. The match was played in front of an attendance of 8,500 people which meant that the Stadion Schützenwiese was sold out. FCB started slowly into the game and FCW took control. A good move gave Luca Zuffi a chance, but his long-range shot was blocked by Basel keeper Yann Sommer. The rebound came to Radice and his effort forced the keeper to make another good save. The next chance after a good long-ball from Zuffi, was another shot from Radice, Sommer tipped the ball over the top. FCW had a few more chances, but then a mistake in their mid-field. A bad pass from Sven Lüscher, Alexander Frei pushed the ball into the box and captain Marco Streller made no mistake to put Basel one up with their first chance in the 38th minute. Two minutes before the break keeper Sommer was lucky not to have a seen a red card as he brought Kuzmanovic down, but referee Alain Bieri gave a yellow card to the forward for a dive. In the second half the underdogs had more of the match then the higher classed visitors and these were glad that their keeper had a good day. The offensive orientation of the FCW enabled the guests to counterattack. In a run two against two, Basel's substitute Xherdan Shaqiri played the ball clear to Frei, but he shot wide with only goalkeeper Christian Leite to beat. Winterthur continued to play forwards, as another counterattack happened and this time Frei was able to shoot into the goal as Shaqiri outplayed the keeper. In added time a slight push from Basel defender Aleksandar Dragović and this time referee Bieri gave the penalty kick, Kuzmanovic put it away. But Basel advanced with the 2–1 victory to the final.

Luzern (16 May 2012)

In winter like conditions, 30,100 fans watched an intense 87th Cup final in the Stade de Suisse, Wankdorf in Bern between FC Basel and FC Luzern. From the first minutes, FCL were the expected defiant opponents against an FCB who played in their best line-up. In the early stages, the Basel fans had to survive a few anxious minutes behind Yann Sommer's goal and they could thank the FCB goalkeeper for keeping the 0–0 at that stage. Heiko Vogel's team didn't even have a handful of scoring chances in the first half, with Valentin Stocker's shot from close range in the 26th minute being the highlight from the FCB point of view. FCL, for its part, was often a bit too complicated in the end. In the 55th minute, Alex Frei was able to take a free kick from the right side. His precise ball found Beni Huggel's head and landed in the net, unreachable for David Zibung. It was a wonderful goal, but it caused was a vigorous reaction from Luzern, which culminated in the 67th minute in the deserved equaliser, also per header, from Tomislav Puljić Because Basel did not get any reward for their final offensive, the game went into extra time. But these 30 minutes only had two mentionable scenes. First, Sommer miraculously saved an effort by Michel Renggli and secondly Radoslav Kováč 's intervention, as last man, against Adrian Winter could have been sanctioned.

Thus, the dramatic evening culminated in the penalty shootout, in which Yann Sommer became the match winning hero. The FCB goalkeeper parried both Ohayon and Gygax's shot marvelously, while all the red and blue players converted their shots. Basel won the Swiss Cup 4–2 in the penalty shootout. This was Basel's 11th Swiss Cup title. Furthermore, nobody who watched or participated was surprised that Yann Sommer won the man of the match trophy.

Conclusion

The club's clear aim had been to win back the title that they had lost the previous season. They completed their aim and thus won the league and cup double.

=== Champions League ===
Basel's positioning in the 2010–11 Swiss Super League entered them directly into the group stage of the 2011–12 UEFA Champions League.

==== Group stage ====
The seeding and draw for this stage took take place on 25 August in Monaco. Teams were seeded into four pots based on their 2011 UEFA club coefficients. Basel were drawn in Group C with Benfica, Manchester United and Oțelul Galați, the first match was a home game on 14 September.

Oțelul Galați (14 September 2011)

With 30,126 fans the St. Jakob Park was not sold out on this warm and dry clear evening. During the early stages Basel had more ball possession, however, it was the visitors who created the clearer chances. In the second minute the Basel defence failed to clear the ball, but Gabriel Giurgiu shot too weakly straight into goalkeeper Yann Sommer's arms. Then in the sixth minute Liviu Antal broke down the right with tempo and crossed to Giurgiu, but Sommer saved his volley. Following these first two efforts, Basel took control and played patiently looking for an opening. Oțelul relied on counterattacks, but these were rare. Basel's biggest chance arose in the 27th minute as centre-back Milan Perendija failed to connect to Fabian Frei's long pass. The ball fell in the path of Alexander Frei, whose hard drive was well saved by keeper Branko Grahovac. Another big chance came in the 39th minute as Markus Steinhöfer took a quick throw in and caught the visiting defence open. Marco Streller out played Adrian Sălăgeanu as he cut-back behind the defender and then he sent a perfect cross in for Fabian Frei to head home. Oţelul responded well after the break, pressing forward. On 58 minutes they managed the equaliser, Liviu Antal fired a good shot, Sommer parried it, but the ball fell to Marius Pena and he chipped the ball over the keeper. Granit Xhaka and Alex Frei both with their opportunities and so it felt as though Basel were running out of time. Then as Streller had a chance in the 82nd minute, he was brought down by defender Sălăgeanu. Referee William Collum from the Scottish Football Association had no choice, showed the defender a straight red and awarded a penalty that Alex Frei converted. Finally Benjamin Huggel received a second yellow and was also dismissed with three minutes left.

Manchester United (27 September 2011)

Matchday 2 was played in Old Trafford on a cloudy evening in front of 73.115 fans. Referee was Paolo Tagliavento of the Italian Football Federation and he reported a damp pitch. Both teams started well, but two goals from Danny Welbeck in the 16th and 17th minutes looked to have put United in control. Welbeck's first goal came when he scuffed a shot in off the post, and the England forward's second was a far more convincing strike from Ryan Giggs' cross. Fabian Frei shot in off the post on 58 minutes to give Basel hope, and Alexander Frei's header, aided by awful defending from Rio Ferdinand, made it 2–2. With 15 minutes remaining, Basel were awarded a penalty and Alexander Frei sent David de Gea the wrong way to give Basel a shock lead and leave United on the brink of a first home defeat in almost 18 months. In the 90th minute, however, Ashley Young headed home Nani's cross at the back post to rescue a point. United could have earned all three points had substitute Dimitar Berbatov not shot into the side-netting rather than play it along the ground for a tap-in. Instead, United were forced to settle for a point, as they went down to third in Group C. This was the first time since 1999 that United had failed to win either of their first two Champions League group stage matches.

Benfica (18 October 2011)

Matchday 3 was played at home in the St. Jakob Park was played on a dry pitch, on a clear evening, in front of a sold-out 35,831 attendance. Referee was Viktor Kassai from the Hungarian Football Federation. In the early stages the teams were showing entertaining football, but Benfica goalkeeper Artur and Basel's Yann Sommer were more than equal to the attempts from Alexander Frei and Rodrigo. The first really good chance occurred in the 20th minute as the visitors made a quick breakthrough. Nicolás Gaitán broke forward as he played a quick one-two with fellow Argentinian Pablo Aimar. He then passed into the middle, Rodrigo let the ball pass, and Bruno César was free to shoot the ball beyond Sommer. The home side then pressed for a quick equaliser. Xherdan Shaqiri made himself space, passed to Marco Streller but he could not beat keeper Artur with his hard low drive. Gaitán was the force behind Benfica's concise play and the same was true of Shaqiri for Basel. On 65 minutes Shaqiri found the free running Streller with a perfect timed pass, but again it was Artur who was well positioned to foil the striker's effort. Midway through the second period Benfica's coach Jorge Jesus brought on Nolito and Óscar Cardozo for Aimar and Rodrigo. Four minutes later Benjamin Huggel was shown a yellow card for a foul on Cardozo and the fouled striker slammed the free-kick beyond the reach of the keeper into the net. Basel were still coming forward in an attempt to get back into the game. Shaqiri running and running, shooting from range, shooting from close and then running at the Benfica defence again. He proved as being too quick for defender Emerson, who for his second bookable foul on the Basel winger was dismissed. Despite their efforts, the result remained 0–2.

Benfica (2 November 2011)

Matchday 4 was the return match in Estádio da Luz in front of 39,270 fans on a rainy evening. Benfica started very fast and their first chance, with less than a minute played, came as Pablo Aimar passed well between the Basel defenders to Rodrigo. But his shot was turned behind the post by keeper Yann Sommer. Aimer hit the resulting corner-kick high, but Nemanja Matić's header was punched away by Sommer. Then the Spanish striker Rodrigo gave the Portuguese team the perfect start with a fourth-minute volley, this time Sommer had no chance. Benfica suppressed the game, but Basel had more ball possession and significant territorial advantage. However, apart from a few speculative long-range efforts from the lively winger Xherdan Shaqiri, Basel's attack failed to trouble the confident Benfica keeper Artur. In the 31st minute Fabian Frei had the best FCB chance. However, despite being well placed, he headed Jacques Zoua's cross wide. After the break the home team did more for the game than they had before. Within a matter of minutes Rodrigo twice had the chance to increase the lead. First, he hit the ball over the top, after Aimar's good diagonal pass, then he headed Maxi Pereira's accurate cross straight into Sommer's hands. On 64 minutes Basel striker Scott Chipperfield raced down the left of the field. His low perfectly weighted cross was met by the onrushing captain Benjamin Huggel and he placed his superb shot inside Artur's right-hand post from the edge of the penalty area. Benfica tried to react, but the 1–1 score line remained up until the final whistle from referee Carlos Velasco Carballo of the Royal Spanish Football Federation.

Oțelul Galați (22 November 2011)

Oțelul Galați played their home matches at Stadionul Național, Bucharest as their own Stadionul Oţelul did not meet UEFA criteria. It was a clear night, the pitch was dry and the temperature had dropped below the freezing point as referee Tom Harald Hagen of the Football Association of Norway blew the whistle to start the game in front of 5,787 fans. It was Otelul who took an immediate grip on the game. Laurenţiu Iorga's free-kick gave the home team their first good chance. The ball came quickly to defender Cristian Sârghi stood at the far post, but his header flew over the bar. Oţelul continued their pressing game, but it was a good move at the other end that gave the opening goal. On the 10th minute Alexander Frei played a neat ball forward to Marco Streller and he passed inside to Fabian Frei and his shot was hard and precise. Four minutes later the home team's offside trap did not work and Streller sprinted forwards into the gaining space. Captain Streller could have gone for goal himself, but unselfishly chipped the ball across for Alexander Frei who volleyed it into the net. In the 37th minute, defender Adrian Sălăgeanu's clearance hit Alexander Frei and the loose ball came to Streller, although he was under pressure from two defenders, he kept calm and easily beat the out rushing keeper Branko Grahovac. Three goals up at half-time, Basel spooled down the first 30 minutes of the second half without any worries. Exactly on 75 minutes captain Gabriel Giurgiu scored from the edge of the penalty area. The moods changed immediately and Oţelul found a new momentum. The Basel defence tried not to react too nervously, but six minutes later left-back Park Joo-Ho was far too casual inside the area, letting Liviu Antal round him and place his short out of reach for keeper Yann Sommer. Despite the tense final ten minutes Sommer was not beaten again and Basel could record a 3–2 victory.

Manchester United (7 December 2011)

The starting position for both clubs on matchday 6 in the sold-out St. Jakob Park with 36,894 fans was clear. With Benfica already assured of progress to the knock-out stage, Basel and Manchester United dualled together for their group second qualifying berth. United needed only a point and the hosts would only stay in the competition with a win. It was a cool evening and at times it rained after referee Björn Kuipers of the Royal Dutch Football Association blew his whistle for the kick-off. United started well their hopes were somewhat dashed as their defence failed to clear a Markus Steinhöfer cross from the right. The ball went to the far side Xherdan Shaqiri claimed it on the left and sent it hard and high back into the centre. Keeper David de Gea could not clear the ball far enough and captain Marco Streller slammed a fierce shot home to put the hosts a goal ahead after nine minutes. The early goal gave Basel an optimism and they played with a good momentum and they continued to press forwards. United struggled to control the Basel wingers Shaqiri to the right and Fabian Frei on the left. As the game commenced Nani became equally influential for the visitors. After 30 minutes he brought a good cross to the middle but both Wayne Rooney and Park Ji-Sung were unable to reach it. A few minutes late Nani's own effort was bravely smothered by Yann Sommer. Rooney had a second chance a few minutes later but the Basel keeper was equal to that too. United began the second half positively, but their increasing frustration was becoming obvious. All the more so, then as while trying to make a clearance, right-back Steinhöfer volleyed the ball against his own crossbar. Steinhöfer came away laughing and within minutes the Basel fans created a song to celebrate his feat. Basel created chances for themselves, Alexander Frei had one kick acrobatically saved. Then another counter-attack and Shaqiri played a neat cross from the right, Streller dummied by striding under the ball and Alexander Frei was there to head it home at the far post, with six minutes of play left. Although Phil Jones headed the ball home after Federico Macheda's shot had rebounded from the cross-bar, Basel survived a tense final two minutes to advance to the knock-out phase with the 2–1 win.

Conclusion

Basel played very impressive away games remaining undefeated, winning in Romania and drawing in Lisbon and Manchester. They finished the group in second place after a decisive home win against Manchester United and thus securing qualification for the knockout phase, the round of 16. The team had achieved their group stage aim with bravura.

==== Knockout phase ====
In the knockout phase, teams played against each other over two legs on a home-and-away basis, except for the one-match final. The draw for the round of 16 was held on 16 December 2011. In the draw for the round of 16, the eight group winners were seeded, and the eight group runners-up were unseeded. The seeded teams were drawn against the unseeded teams, with the seeded team hosting the second leg. Teams from the same group or the same association could not be drawn against each other. Basel were drawn against Bayern Munich.

Bayern Munich (22 February 2012)

The first leg in the round of 16 was played in the with 36,000 spectators sold-out St. Jakob-Park on a clear night with soft pitch under referee Nicola Rizzoli of the Italian Football Federation. Bayern began with purpose and just two minutes had passed as Franck Ribéry played into the box for Mario Gomez, but the angle created by the pass around goalkeeper Yann Sommer made finishing impossible. Within the opening quarter of an hour Ribéry twice had the opportunity to open the scoring, but he was denied by the good reacting keeper Sommer on both occasions. The hosts seemed to be content in letting the Bayern control possession, but as they played their counter-attacks they were always dangerous. In fact, the home team hit the goal frame twice with just a few minutes in the first period. First after a corner Aleksandar Dragović had a header deflected onto the near post by keeper Manuel Neuer, then Alexander Frei fired his shot against the cross-bar, this time the keeper had no chance of reaching the ball. The closer the half time break came, Bayern's play became more and more ponderous and their movements were predictable. Marco Streller had the first chance in the second period, but his header landed harmlessly into Neuer's arms. Bayern controlled things, were dangerous, but not Successful with their efforts. Therefore Jupp Heynckes substituted in Thomas Müller for Ribéry in the later stages and it was his quickly played ball that gave Gomez another attempt at goal. But his angled effort was parried by the excellent reacting keeper Sommer. The visitors played more and more stagnant and suddenly Basel were able to take advantage four minutes from time. Only three minutes into the game, substitute Jacques Zoua and substitute Stocker combined perfectly, with Stocker pushing the ball beyond Neuer’ s reach to give the hosts a 1–0 victory.

Return match (13 March 2012)

Basel travelled to the Allianz Arena for the second leg with optimismus. The stadium was sold-out with 66,000 fans on this cloudy evening and the pitch was described as dry as referee Mark Clattenburg from the Football Association blew his whistle for the kick-off. Bit Basel's 1-0 aggregate lead was wiped out after 10 minutes by Arjen Robben and after the home team had dominated most of the match, Bayern seized complete control with two further goals from Thomas Müller and from Mario Gomez shortly before the break. By this time the match could be considered as decided, because then Bayern played themselves into an ecstasy after the break. Gomez scored four goals as Bayern cruised into the quarter-finals with a record-breaking victory. Robben rounded off a memorable night for the home team with his second goal after 81 minutes.

Conclusion

Bayern advanced to the next round, they then advanced as far as the final. But here they were defeated Chelsea after a penalty shoot-out.

Basel's Champions League came to an end, following good results in the group stage and a good result in the first leg of the round of 16, with a disappointing match in the second leg. Nevertheless, the team had achieved their European aim.

== Players ==
=== First team ===
The following is the list of the Basel first team squad. It also includes players that were in the squad the day the season started on 16 July 2011 but subsequently left the club after that date.

Note: Flags indicate national team as defined under FIFA eligibility rules; some limited exceptions apply. Players may hold more than one non-FIFA nationality.

No.	Pos.	Nation	Player
1	GK	SUI	Yann Sommer
3	DF	KOR	Park Joo-Ho (from Júbilo Iwata)
4	DF	SUI	Philipp Degen (Free agent)
5	DF	SUI	Arlind Ajeti (from U-21)
6	DF	AUT	Aleksandar Dragović
7	MF	SUI	Pascal Schürpf (loan to Aarau)
8	MF	SUI	Benjamin Huggel (Captain)
9	FW	SUI	Marco Streller
10	MF	CIV	Gilles Yapi
11	MF	AUS	Scott Chipperfield
13	FW	SUI	Alexander Frei
14	MF	SUI	Valentin Stocker
15	MF	SUI	Kay Voser (from Grasshopper Club)
16	MF	SUI	Taulant Xhaka (loan to Grasshopper Club)
17	MF	SUI	Xherdan Shaqiri

No.	Pos.	Nation	Player
18	GK	SUI	Marcel Herzog (from MSV Duisburg)
19	DF	ARG	David Abraham
20	MF	SUI	Fabian Frei (returned after loan to St. Gallen)
21	DF	SUI	Genséric Kusunga
23	GK	SUI	Massimo Colomba
24	MF	SUI	Cabral
25	MF	SUI	Darko Jevtić (played in U-21)
26	FW	SUI	Roman Buess (played in U-21)
27	DF	GER	Markus Steinhöfer
28	MF	SUI	Stephan Andrist (from Thun)
29	DF	CZE	Radoslav Kováč (from West Ham United)
30	FW	ZAM	Fwayo Tembo (loan to ES Sahel)
31	FW	CMR	Jacques Zoua
32	MF	SUI	Sandro Wieser (to TSG 1899 Hoffenheim)
34	MF	SUI	Granit Xhaka
35	FW	PRK	Pak Kwang-Ryong (from Wil)

=== Summer transfers ===
==== In ====
Note: Flags indicate national team as defined under FIFA eligibility rules; some limited exceptions apply. Players may hold more than one non-FIFA nationality.

No.	Pos.	Nation	Player
3	DF	KOR	Park Joo-Ho (from Júbilo Iwata)
4	DF	SUI	Philipp Degen (Free agent)
5	DF	SUI	Arlind Ajeti (from U-21)
20	MF	SUI	Fabian Frei (returned after loan to St. Gallen)

No.	Pos.	Nation	Player
25	MF	SUI	Darko Jevtić (played in U-21)
26	FW	SUI	Roman Buess (played in U-21)
28	MF	SUI	Stephan Andrist (from Thun)
29	DF	CZE	Radoslav Kováč (from West Ham United)
35	FW	PRK	Pak Kwang-Ryong (from Wil)

==== Out ====
Note: Flags indicate national team as defined under FIFA eligibility rules; some limited exceptions apply. Players may hold more than one non-FIFA nationality.

No.	Pos.	Nation	Player
-	DF	TUR	Çağdaş Atan (to Mersin İdman Yurdu)
-	MF	SUI	Dominik Ritter (to Winterthur)
-	MF	SUI	Orhan Mustafi (to Grasshopper Club)
15	FW	ARG	Federico Almerares (to Xamax)
16	MF	SUI	Taulant Xhaka (loan to Grasshopper Club)
20	DF	SWE	Behrang Safari (to Malmö FF)
22	DF	GHA	Samuel Inkoom (to FC Dnipro)

No.	Pos.	Nation	Player
26	MF	SUI	Daniel Unal (to Locarno)
28	DF	SUI	Beg Ferati (to SC Freiburg)
29	DF	SUI	Janick Kamber (to Lausanne-Sport)
32	DF	SUI	Reto Zanni (to Vaduz)
35	FW	GER	Matthias Baron (to Vaduz)
30	FW	ZAM	Fwayo Tembo (loan to ES Sahel)
32	MF	SUI	Sandro Wieser (to TSG 1899 Hoffenheim)

== Results and fixtures ==
=== Friendlies ===
==== Pre-season ====
24 June 2011 Pre-season	Basel	1–3	Neuchâtel Xamax	Stades des Places, Glovelier
18:30 CEST	A. Frei 66' (pen. 1:1)	FCB summary	Gelabert 46' (0:1); Niasse 74' (1:2); Veloso 90+1' (1:3)	Attendance: 2'900; Referee: Damir Omerovic

25 June 2011 Pre-season	St. Gallen	3–3	Basel	Rüti, Henau
15:00 CEST	Etoundi 4' (1:0); Lüchinger 59' (pen. 2:2); Owona 68' (3:2)	FCB summary	A. Frei 30' (1:1); Zoua 32' (1:2); Huggel 82' (3:3)	Attendance: 2'500; Referee: Daniel Stocker

28 June 2011 Pre-season	Landkreisauswahl Miesbach	0–15	Basel	Sport-Arena, Warngau
18:00 CEST		FCB summary	2' (0:1) Streller; 13' (0:2) A. Frei; 15' (0:3)Schürpf; 23' (0:4) Streller; 28' (0:5) Dragović; 37' (0:6) A. Frei; 45' (0:7) A. Frei; 57' (0:8) Pak; 63' (0:9) Buess; 71' (0:10) Zoua; 72' (0:11) Pak; 77' (0:12) Zoua; 79' (0:13) Pak; 85' (0:14) Pak; 89' (0:15) Buess	Attendance: 300; Referee: Philipp Rank

30 June 2011 Pre-season	Basel	4–0	Zestafoni	Grenzlandstadion, Kufstein
18:30 CEST	Pak 9' (1:0); Yapi (yellow card) 37'; A. Frei 45' (2:0); A. Frei 67' (3:0); Buess 81' (4;0)	FCB summary	(yellow card) 16' Tsinamdzgvrishvili	Attendance: 100; Referee: Andreas Heiss

2 July 2011 Pre-season	Basel	1–2	Dinamo București	Sportzentrum, Schwaz
16:30 CEST	A. Frei 66' (1:1)	FCB summary	6' (0:1) Dănciulescu; 89' (1:2) Ţucudean	Attendance: 200; Referee: Michael Schiffmann

3 July 2011 Pre-season	Lustenau 07	1–1	Basel	Stadion an der Holzstrasse, Lustenau
14:00 CEST	Luxbacher 80'	FCB summary	81' Vuleta; (yellow card) 85' Cabral	Attendance: 1,200; Referee: Peter Gruber

8 July 2011 Pre-season	Hégenheim	0–4	Basel	Stade de l'Eisweiher, Hégenheim
18:30 CEST		FCB summary	28' (0:1) A. Frei; 37' (0:2) Zoua; (yellow card) 38' Steinhöfer; 77' (0:3) Abraham; 87' (0:4) Vuleta	Attendance: 2,500; Referee: Eric Sommer

==== Uhrencup ====
The Uhrencup is a club football tournament, held annually in Grenchen.

11 July 2011 Uhrencup; Round 1	Basel	3–0	Hertha BSC	Stadion Brühl, Grenchen
20:30 CEST	A. Frei 33' (pen. 1:0); A. Frei 44' (2:0); A. Frei 53' (3:0)	FCB summary		Attendance: 8,321; Referee: Alain Bieri

13 July 2011 Uhrencup; Round 2	Basel	2–1	West Ham United	Stadion Brühl, Grenchen
19:30 CEST	Pak 53' (1:0); Yapi 90+1' (pen. 2:1)	FCB summary	(yellow card) 16' O'Brien; 75' (pen. 1:1) Stanislas	Attendance: 3,200; Referee: Cyril Zimmermann

==== Mid-season ====
20 July 2011 Mid-season	Basel	5–0	Schaffhausen	Stadion Rankhof, Basel
17:00	F. Frei 3' (1:0); F. Frei 59' (2:0); Schürpf 68' (3:0); F. Frei 70' (4:0); Schürpf 82' (3:0)	Summary		Attendance: 550; Referee: Pascal Erlachner

24 August 2011 Mid-season	SC Dornach	0–6	Basel	Gigersloch, Dornach
19:00		Summary	42' (0:1) Cabral; 45' (0:2) A. Frei; 48' (pen.) A. Frei; 70' (0:4) Streller; 84' (0:5) Buess; 90+1' (0:6) Shaqiri	Attendance: 600; Referee: Patrick Winter

1 September 2011 Mid-season	SV Muttenz	0–5	Basel	Sportplatz Margelacker, Muttenz
19:00		Summary	20' (0:1) Nafiu; 44' (0:2) Huggel; 61' (pen.) A. Frei; 70' (0:4) A. Frei; 73' (0:5) Buess	Attendance: 750; Referee: Adrien Jaccottet

6 September 2011 Mid-season	Basel	3–1	Chiasso	Stadion Rankhof, Basel
16:30	Buess 15' (1:0); Zoua 27' (2:0); Huggel 40' (3:1)	Summary	71' (3:1) Graf	Attendance: 950; Referee: Pascal Erlachner

6 October 2011 Mid-season	Solothurn	0–1	Basel	Stadion FC Solothurn, Solothurn
19:00	Meier (yellow card) 36'; Steffen (yellow card) 58'	Summary	15' (0:1) Huggel; (yellow card) 40' Andrist	Attendance: 650; Referee: Fedayi San

11 October 2011 Mid-season	Basel	4–0	Wohlen	Stadion Rankhof, Basel
16:00	Chipperfield 17' (1:0); Andrist 28' (2:0); Abraham 66' (3:0); Andrist 81' (4:0)	Summary		Attendance: 780; Referee: Daniel Wermelinger

10 November 2011 Mid-season	Basel	10–0	SC Dornach	Stadion Rankhof, Basel
18:30	Schürpf 4' (1:0); Buess 20' (2:0); Andrist 27' (3:0); Buess 31' (4:0); Kusunga 36' (5:0); Chipperfield 51' (6:0); Buess 57' (7:0); Schürpf 61' (8:0); Andrist 76' (9:0); Marko Bicvic (10:0)	Summary		Attendance: 350; Referee: Lukas Fähndrich

15 November 2011 Mid-season	Basel	2–3	St. Gallen	Stadion Rankhof, Basel
16:00	Andrist 67' (1:3); Vuleta 78' (2:3)	Summary	8' (0:1) Valente; 31' (0:2) Pa Modou; 44' (pen. 44) Scarione	Attendance: 950; Referee: Fedayi San

==== Winter break and Mid-season ====
12 January 2012 Winter break	Basel	0–0	NEC	Marbella Football Center, Marbella
16:00 CEST		FCB summary		Attendance: 200; Referee: Juan Francisco Caravaca (Estepona)

14 January 2012 Winter break	Basel	3–3	Feyenoord	Marbella Football Center, Marbella
16:00 CEST	Zoua 21' (1:1); Chipperfield 28' (2:1); Zoua 43' (3:1)	FCB summary	12' (0:1) Guidetti; 54' (3:2) Schaken; 67' (3:3) Guidetti	Attendance: 400; Referee: Ismael Pino Blanco

17 January 2012 Winter break	Basel	1–0	Videoton	Marbella Football Center, Marbella
16:00 CEST	Andrist 62' (1:0)	FCB summary		Attendance: 200; Referee: Rafael Domingo Cervantes (Málaga)

18 January 2012 Winter break	Basel	0–0	Morocco	Marbella Football Center Marbella
11:00 CEST		FCB summary		Attendance: 60; Referee: Juan Francisco Caravaca (Estepona)
Note: Playing time reduced to 2x 25 minutes

25 January 2012 Winter break	Basel	2–3	Vaduz	Stadion Rankhof, Basel
14:00	Kováč 49' (1:2); A. Frei 79' (2:2); A. Frei (yellow card) 87'	FCB summary	4' (0:1) Burgmeier; 20' (0:2) Baron; 81' (pen. 2:3) Merenda	Attendance: 750; Referee: Adrien Jaccottet

29 January 2012 Winter break	Basel	7–1	Delémont	Stadion Rankhof, Basel
15:00	A. Frei 38' (1:0); Dragović (yellow card) 36'; Streller 54' (2:0); Andrist 59' (3:1); A. Frei 74' (4:1); Zoua 77' (5:1); Dragović 81' (6:1); Zoua 88' (7:1)	FCB summary	55' (2:1) Hengel; (yellow card) 59' B. Hulmann; (yellow card) 73' Sirufo	Attendance: 850; Referee: Daniel Wermelinger

12 February 2012 Mid-season	Basel	2–0	Lausanne-Sport	Stadion Schützenmatte, Basel
14:00	A. Frei 38' (pen. 1:0); Kusunga 71' (2:0)	FCB summary		Attendance: 500; Referee: Sandro Schärer

16 March 2012 Mid-season	Basel	3–4	Egypt U-23	Stadion Rankhof, Basel
18:30	Zoua 11' (1:0); Zoua 80' (2:3); Shaqiri 93' (pen. 3:4)	FCB summary	28' (pen. 1:1) Elneny; 56' (2:1) Salah; 66' (3:1) Mohsen; 85' (2:4) Salah	Attendance: 500; Referee: Sascha Amhof

=== Swiss Super League ===
Kickoff times are in CET

==== First half of season ====
16 July 2011 Round 1	Young Boys	1–1	Basel	Stade de Suisse, Bern
20:15	Nef (yellow card) 29'; Mayuka 56'	FCB summary	50' Zoua; (yellow card) 65' Voser; (yellow card) 75' Dragović	Attendance: 31,120; Referee: (Switzerland) Stephan Studer

24 July 2011 Round 2	Basel	2–0	Neuchâtel Xamax	St. Jakob-Park, Basel
16:00	Huggel 2' (1:0); Binya 37' (o.g. 2:0); Cabral (yellow card) 85'	FCB summary	(yellow card) 38' Navarro; (yellow card) 76' Sánchez	Attendance: 27,833; Referee: (Switzerland) Stephan Klossner

30 July 2011 Round 3	Grasshopper	2–2	Basel	Letzigrund, Zürich
17:45	Feltscher 67' (1:1); Feltscher (yellow card) 74'; Emeghara 77' (2:1)	FCB summary	(yellow card) 24' A. Frei; (yellow card) 29' Huggel; 54' (1:0) A. Frei; (yellow card) 70' Shaqiri; (yellow card) 84' Steinhöfer; 88' (2:2) A. Frei; (yellow card) 90+2' Kováč	Attendance: 7'500; Referee: (Switzerland) Jérôme Laperrière

6 August 2011 Round 4	Basel	3–3	Sion	St. Jakob-Park, Basel
17:45	Kováč (yellow card) 5'; Zoua 15' (1:1); Shaqiri 24' (2:2); Huggel (yellow card) 75'; Cabral 90+2' (3:3)	FCB summary	6' (0:1) Vanczák; (yellow card) 18' Sio; 20' (1:2) Adaílton; (yellow card) 27' Serey Dié; 80' (2:3) Sio; (yellow card) 89' Vaņins; (yellow card) 90+5' Rodrigo	Attendance: 27,702; Referee: (Switzerland) Patrick Graf

13 August 2011 Round 5	Basel	1–2	Zürich	St. Jakob-Park, Basel
17:45	Abraham 30'; Cabral (yellow card) 79'	FCB summary	(yellow card) 45' Béda; (yellow card) 55' Teixeira; (yellow card) 68' Chermiti; (yellow card) 79' Buff; 87' Béda; (yellow card) 88' Mehmedi; 90+3' Chermiti	Attendance: 30,642; Referee: (Switzerland) Nikolaj Hänni

20 August 2011 Round 6	Luzern	3–1	Basel	Swissporarena, Luzern
17:45	Ferreira 72' (3:1); Hochstrasser 21' (2:0); Ferreira (yellow card) 42'; Ferreira 72' (3:1); Zibung (yellow card) 74'; Wiss (yellow card) 87'	FCB summary	33' (2:1) Streller; (yellow card) 75' Voser; (yellow card) 83' (yellow-red card) 84' Huggel; (yellow card) 87' A. Frei	Attendance: 17,000; Referee: (Switzerland) Sacha Kever

28 August 2011 Round 7	Basel	2–1	Thun	St. Jakob-Park, Basel
16:00	A. Frei 13' (1:0); Dragović (yellow card) 32'; F. Frei 49' (2:0); Schürpf (yellow card) 56'; Andrist (yellow card) 83'; A. Frei (yellow card) 84'; G. Xhaka (yellow card) 90+2'	FCB summary	(yellow card) 36' Schindelholz; (yellow card) 49' Lüthi; (yellow card) 61' Hediger; 69' (2:1) Lustrinelli	Attendance: 29,344; Referee: (Switzerland) Stephan Studer

10 September 2011 Round 8	Servette	0–4	Basel	Stade de Genève, Geneva
17:45	Pont (yellow card) 58'; Rüfli (yellow card) 66'; Vitkieviez (penalty missed) 79′	FCB summary	33' (0:1) F. Frei; (yellow card) 38' Abraham; (yellow card) 53' F. Frei; 60' (0:2) F. Frei; 69' (0:3) Streller; (yellow card) 77' Dragović; 86' (0:4) G. Xhaka	Attendance: 20,838; Referee: (Switzerland) Nikolaj Hänni

21 September 2011 Round 9	Basel	6–0	Lausanne-Sport	St. Jakob-Park, Basel
19:45	Streller (91:0); A. Frei 14' (2:0); Huggel 22' (3:0); A. Frei 27' (pen. 4:0); Xherdan Shaqiri 52' (5:0); A. Frei 73' (6:0)	FCB summary	(yellow card) 26' Meoli; (yellow card) 49' Kamber	Attendance: 26,046; Referee: (Switzerland) Stephan Klossner

24 September 2011 Round 10	Thun	1–1	Basel	Arena Thun, Thun
17:45	Lustrinelli (yellow card) 50'; Matic (yellow card) 74'; Rama 81' (1:1)	FCB summary	(yellow card) 26' Abraham; 72' (0:1) Streller	Attendance: 7,801; Referee: (Switzerland) Damien Carrel

1 October 2011 Round 11	Basel	3–0	Servette	St. Jakob-Park, Basel
17:45	Dragović 42' (1:0); A. Frei 44' (2:0); A. Frei 76' (3:0)	FCB summary	(yellow card) 63' Moubandje; (yellow card) 71' Yartey; (yellow card) 90' M'Futi	Attendance: 30,214; Referee: (Switzerland) Patrick Graf

23 October 2011 Round 12	Zürich	0–1	Basel	Letzigrund, Zürich
16:00	Schönbächler (yellow card) 65'; Buff (yellow card) 78'; Nikçi (yellow card) 89'	FCB summary	55' Shaqiri; (yellow card) 73' Abraham; (yellow card) 89' Andrist	Attendance: 14,400; Referee: (Switzerland) Stephan Studer

26 October 2011 Round 13	Sion	0–1	Basel	Tourbillon, Sion
19:45	Mutsch (yellow card) 51'	FCB summary	45' Zoua	Attendance: 10,800; Referee: (Switzerland) Sascha Kever

29 October 2011 Round 14	Basel	4–1	Grasshopper	St. Jakob-Park, Basel
19:45	Shaqiri 6'; Andrist 19'; A. Frei 26'; Dragović (yellow card) 66'; F. Frei 77'	FCB summary	(yellow card) 62' Bertucci; (yellow card) 64' Toko; 68' Toko	Attendance: 29,245; Referee: (Switzerland) Cyril Zimmermann

5 November 2011 Round 15	Lausanne-Sport	2–3	Basel	Pontaise, Lausanne
17:45 CEST	Moussilou 7' (1:0); Roux (yellow card) 29'; Meoli (yellow card) 33'; Pasche (yellow card) 35'; Moussilou 43' (2:2); Moussilou (yellow card) 76'; Kamber (yellow card) 83'	FCB summary	13' (1:1) Huggel; (yellow card) 23' Cabral; 34' (1:2) A. Frei; (yellow card) 44' Streller; 65' (2:3) A. Frei	Attendance: 7,950; Referee: (Switzerland) Daniel Wermelinger

19 November 2011 Round 16	Basel	1–0	Young Boys	St. Jakob-Park, Basel
17:45	Streller 27' (1:0)	FCB summary		Attendance: 32,006; Referee: (Switzerland) Sascha Kever
Note: Fair game, no yellow cards

3 December 2011 Round 17	Basel	1–0	Luzern	St. Jakob-Park, Basel
17:45	Cabral (yellow card) 32'; A. Frei (yellow card) 64'; Streller 70' (1:0); Abraham (yellow card) 82'; Dragović (yellow card) 87'	FCB summary	(yellow card) 32' Gygax; (yellow card) 61' H. Yakin; (yellow card) 68' Stahel; (yellow card) 84' Sarr	Attendance: 31,081; Referee: (Switzerland) Alain Bieri

11 December 2011 Round 18	Neuchâtel Xamax	1–1	Basel	Maladière, Neuchâtel
16:00	Navarro (yellow card) 43'; Besle (yellow card) 48' (yellow-red card) 53'; Dampha 80' (1:1)	FCB summary	(yellow card) 43' Dragović; 77' (0:1) Streller; (yellow card) 90+1' Shaqiri; (yellow card) 90+2' Streller	Attendance: 5,504; Referee: (Switzerland) Nikolaj Hänni

==== Second half of season ====
Neuchâtel Xamax had their license revoked during the winter break, the club's second-half matches were cancelled entirely. The Swiss Football Association competed the second half of the season with only nine clubs. The remaining nine played another double round-robin schedule. Each of the nine clubs had then played 34 matches at the end of the season.

5 February 2012 Round 19	Basel	0–0	Sion	St. Jakob-Park, Basel
16:00	Shaqiri (yellow card) 62'	FCB summary	(yellow card) 41' Adaílton; (yellow card) 57' Dingsdag; (yellow card) 67' Basha	Attendance: 25,762; Referee: (Switzerland) Damien Carrel

11 February 2012 Round 20	Lausanne-Sport	P–P	Basel	Pontaise, Lausanne
17:45		(Report)

16 February 2012 Round 21	Young Boys	2–2	Basel	Stade de Suisse, Bern
20:15	Spycher 32' (pen. 1:0); Wölfli (yellow card) 35'; Farnerud (yellow card) 46'; Costanzo 76' (2:1); Spycher (yellow card) 81'	FCB summary)	(yellow card) 14' Steinhöfer; (yellow card) 31' Dragović; (yellow card) 35' A. Frei; (yellow card) 59' Shaqiri; 71' (1:1) Streller; 90' (2:2) Stocker; (yellow card) 90+2' G. Xhaka	Attendance: 20,246; Referee: (Switzerland) Sascha Kever

26 February 2012 Round 22	Basel	1–0	Zürich	St. Jakob-Park, Basel
16:00	A. Frei 56' (1:0); Streller (yellow card) 60'; Dragović (yellow card) 83'; Degen (yellow card) 85'	FCB summary	(yellow card) 15' Buff; (yellow card) 52' Pedro Henrique; (yellow card) 54' Drmić	Attendance: 28,516; Referee: (Switzerland) Stephan Klossner

4 March 2012 Round 23	Basel	3–1	Luzern	St. Jakob-Park, Basel
16:00	Abraham 28' (1:0); Kováč (yellow card) 42'; Steinhöfer (yellow card) 45'; Stocker (yellow card) 59'; A. Frei (yellow card) 63'; A. Frei 78' (2:1); A. Frei 81' (3:1)	FCB summary	(yellow card) 15' Renggli; (yellow card) 27' Puljić; 68' (1:1) Ohayon; (red card) 90+2' Lustenberger	Attendance: 30,261; Referee: (Switzerland) Patrick Graf

10 March 2012 Round 24	Grasshopper	0–2	Basel	Letzigrund, Zürich
17:45	Toko (yellow card) 42'; Mustafi (yellow card) 47'	FCB summary	5' (0:1) Shaqiri; 40' (0:2) Degen; (yellow card) 47' Abraham	Attendance: 7,000; Referee: (Switzerland) Damien Carrel

18 March 2012 Round 25	Neuchâtel Xamax	Cancelled	Basel	Maladière, Neuchâtel

24 March 2012 Round 26	Basel	5–0	Servette	St. Jakob-Park, Basel
17:45	Abraham 44' (1:0); A. Frei 52' (pen. 2:0); Streller 59' (3:0); A. Frei 87' (4:0); A. Frei 90' (5:0)	FCB summary	(yellow card) 44' De Azevedo; (yellow card) 76' Pizzinat	Attendance: 28,932; Referee: (Switzerland) Daniel Wermelinger

31 March 2012 Round 27	Thun	2–3	Basel	Arena Thun, Thun
17:45	Matić 9' (pen. 1:1); Matić (red card) 23'; Wittwer (yellow card) 37'; Ch. Schneuwly (yellow card) 77' (Hediger)/Sommer 79' (o.g. 2:3)	FCB summary	6' (0:1) Streller; (yellow card) 8' (yellow-red card) 28' Cabral; 41' (1:2) Stocker; 59' (1:3) A. Frei; (yellow card) 81' A. Frei; (yellow card) 90+1' Streller	Attendance: 7,624; Referee: (Switzerland) Sascha Amhof

4 April 2012 Round 20	Lausanne-Sport	0–2	Basel	Pontaise, Lausanne
18:30	Tall (yellow card) 11'; Sonnerat (yellow card) 77'	FCB summary	66' (0:1) A. Frei; 87' (0:2) Pak	Attendance: 5,218; Referee: (Switzerland) Ludovic Gremaud

7 April 2012 Round 28	Luzern	1–1	Basel	Swissporarena, Luzern
17:45	Lezcano 59' (1:1); Lezcano (yellow card) 63'	FCB summary	3' (0:1) Shaqiri	Attendance: 17,000; Referee: (Switzerland) Sascha Kever

15 April 2012 Round 29	Basel	Cancelled	Neuchâtel Xamax	St. Jakob-Park, Basel

22 April 2012 Round 30	Sion	0–3	Basel	Tourbillon, Sion
16:00	Basha (yellow card) 41'; Die (yellow card) 63'; Danilo (yellow card) 71'	FCB summary	(yellow card) 24' G. Xhaka; 49' (0:1) A. Frei; (yellow card) 53' Streller; 74' (0:2) Steinhöfer; 83' (0:3) A. Frei	Attendance: 12,500; Referee: (Switzerland) Stephan Studer

29 April 2012 Round 31	Basel	3–1	Lausanne-Sport	St. Jakob-Park, Basel
16:00	Streller 9' (1:0); Shaqiri (yellow card) 58'; A. Frei 64' (2:1); Dragović (yellow card) 90'; Zoua 90' (3:1)	FCB summary	20' (1:1) Júnior Negrão; (yellow card) 40' Chakhsi; (yellow card) 44' Marazzi; (yellow card) 56' Sonnerat	Attendance: 36,000; Referee: (Switzerland) Ludovic Gremaud

2 May 2012 Round 32	Basel	2–1	Thun	St. Jakob-Park, Basel
19:45	Andrist 16' (1:0); Kováč (yellow card) 59'; Yapi (yellow card) 62'; A. Frei (yellow card) 64'; A. Frei 70' (pen. 2:1)	FCB summary	45+1' (o.g. 1:1) Park; (yellow card) 54' Bigler; (yellow card) 69' Da Costa	Attendance: 26,561; Referee: (Switzerland) Patrick Graf

6 May 2012 Round 33	Zürich	1–5	Basel	Letzigrund, Zürich
16:00	Buff 6' (1:0); Glarner (yellow card) 71'; Chermiti (yellow card) 22' (red card) 82'; Drmić (yellow card) 79'; Buff (yellow card) 79'	FCB summary	10' (pen. 1:1)Shaqiri; 19' (1:2) Shaqiri; (yellow card) 54' Shaqiri; 64' (1:3) Stocker; 72' (pen. 1:4), 82' (1:5) Streller	Attendance: 12,500; Referee: (Switzerland) Sascha Kever

12 May 2012 Round 34	Basel	6–3	Grasshopper	St. Jakob-Park, Basel
17:45	Stocker 28' (1:1); Zoua 38' (2:1); Feltscher 46' (o.g. 3:1); A. Frei 69' (4:1); Huggel 71' (5:1); Zoua 81' (6:3)	FCB summary	4' (0:1) Paiva; (yellow card) 12' La Rocca; (yellow card) 24' Bauer; (yellow card) 57' Landeka; (yellow card) 63' Bertucci; 72' (5:2) Paiva; 73' (5:3) Zuber	Attendance: 30,026; Referee: (Switzerland) Alain Bieri

20 May 2012 Round 35	Servette	2–1	Basel	Stade de Genève, Geneva
16:00	Yartey 12' (1:0); De Azevedo (yellow card) 67'; Moubandje (yellow card) 78'; Eudis 84' (2:1); Rüfli (yellow card) 90+2'	FCB summary Soccerway report	(yellow card) 21' (yellow-red card) 52' Kusunga; 62' (1:1) Zoua; (yellow card) 77' Degen; (yellow card) 90' Streller	Attendance: 21,821; Referee: (Austria) Dominik Ouschan

23 May 2012 Round 36	Basel	1–2	Young Boys	St. Jakob-Park, Basel
20:15	G. Xhaka (yellow card) 22'; Shaqiri 33' (1:1); Sommer (yellow card) 79'	FCB summary Soccerway report	18' (0:1) Costanzo; (yellow card) 48' Simpson; 80' (1:2) Vitkieviez	Attendance: 36,000; Referee: (Switzerland) Stephan Studer

==== League table ====
Pos	Team	Pld	W	D	L	GF	GA	GD	Pts	Qualification or relegation
1	Basel (C)	34	22	8	4	78	33	+45	74	Qualification to Champions League second qualifying round
2	Luzern	34	14	12	8	46	32	+14	54	Qualification to Europa League play-off round (Note: Because 2011–12 Swiss Cup winners Basel qualified for the Champions League, and runners-up Luzern qualified for the Europa League through league position, the distribution of the Europa League spots reverted to league position.)
3	Young Boys	34	13	12	9	52	38	+14	51	Qualification to Europa League second qualifying round
4	Servette	34	14	6	14	45	53	−8	48	Qualification to Europa League second qualifying round
5	Thun	34	11	10	13	38	41	−3	43	
6	Zürich	34	11	8	15	43	44	−1	41	
7	Lausanne-Sport	34	8	6	20	29	61	−32	30	
8	Grasshopper	34	7	5	22	32	66	−34	26	
9	Sion (O)	34	15	8	11	40	35	+5	17 (Note: Sion were deducted 36 points for fielding ineligible players.)	Qualification to relegation play-offs
10	Neuchâtel Xamax (D)	18	7	5	6	22	22	0	26 (Note: Neuchâtel Xamax's license was revoked with immediate effect and they were expelled from the Swiss Football League on 18 January 2012 after not providing necessary financial documents and guarantees. The first-half results of the club will be kept while any matches in spring involving Xamax were cancelled.)	Demotion to the 2. Liga interregional

Source: RSSSF
Rules for classification: 1) points; 2) goal difference; 3) number of goals scored.
(C) Champions; (D) Disqualified; (O) Play-off winners

=== Swiss Cup ===
17 September 2011 Round 1	FC Eschenbach	0–4	Basel	Sportplatz Weiherhaus, Eschenbach LU
17:00		SFV summary FCB summary	Pak 11' (0:1); Pak 36' (0:2); Zoua 44' (pen. 0:3); Chipperfield 71' (0:4)	Attendance: 3,700; Referee: Sascha Amhof

15 October 2011 Round 2	Schötz	1–5	Basel	Sportplatz Wissenhusen, Schötz
17:00	Karajcic (yellow card) 37'; Grüter (yellow card) 55'; Koch 84' (1:4); Tchoumbé (yellow card) 90'	SFV summary FCB summary	Andrist 8' (0:1); Huggel 34' (0:1); Andrist 57' (0:3); Zoua 79' (0:4); A. Frei 89' (1:5)	Attendance: 2,800; Referee: Pascal Erlachner

26 November 2011 Round 3	Wil	2–3 (a.e.t.)	Basel	Bergholz, Wil
17:30	Cavusevic (penalty missed) 61′ Fejzulahi (yellow card) 76'; Schär (yellow card) 81'; Lombardi 84' (1:1); Čavušević 111' (2:1); Bastida (yellow card) 114'; Čavušević (red card) 120'	SFV summary FCB summary	8' (0:1) F. Frei; (yellow card) 55' Kováč; (red card) 59' Sommer; 113' (2:2) Degen; 117' (2:3) A. Frei; (red card) 120' Kunsunga	Attendance: 4,400; Referee: Damien Carrel

21 March 2012 Quarterfinal	Basel	5–2	Lausanne-Sport	St. Jakob-Park, Basel
19:45	Katz 24' (o.g. 1:0); Streller 50' (2:1); A. Frei 59' (pen. 3:1); Streller 89' (4:2); F. Frei 90+2' (5:2)	SFV summary FCB summary	45' (1:1) Roux; 71' (3:2) Roux	Attendance: 8,028; Referee: Cyril Zimmermann (Münsingen)
Note: no yellow cards

15 April 2012 Semifinal	Winterthur	1–2	Basel	Stadion Schützenwiese, Winterthur
14:00	Bengondo (yellow card) 42'; Kuzmanovic (yellow card) 45'; Lüscher (yellow card) 68'; Kuzmanovic 90+3' (pen. 1:2)	SFV summary	(yellow card) 26' Yapi; 38' (0:1) Streller; (yellow card) 64' F. Frei; 89' (0:2) A. Frei; (yellow card) 90+4' A. Frei	Attendance: 8,500; Referee: Alain Bieri (Bern)

Final

16 May 2012
20:30 CEST
Final

Basel	1–1 (a.e.t.)	Luzern
Dragović (yellow card) 40'; Huggel 56' (1:0); G. Xhaka (yellow card) 90'	SFV summary FCB summary	(yellow card) 57' Wiss; 67' (1:1) Puljić; (yellow card) 90' Gygax
Penalties
Yapi Yapo (penalty scored); Streller (penalty scored); Zoua (penalty scored); Shaqiri (penalty scored)	4–2	(penalty scored) Renggli; (penalty missed) Ohayon; (penalty scored) Gygax; (penalty missed) Stahel

Stade de Suisse, Bern
Attendance: 30,100
Referee: Daniel Wermelinger

GK	(Switzerland) Yann Sommer
DF	(Germany) Markus Steinhöfer
DF	(Argentina) David Abraham
DF	(Austria) Aleksandar Dragović	(yellow card) 40'	(substituted off) 72'
DF	(South Korea) Park Joo-Ho
MF	(Switzerland) Xherdan Shaqiri
MF	(Switzerland) Benjamin Huggel (cap)		(substituted off) 96'
MF	(Switzerland) Granit Xhaka	(yellow card) 90'
MF	(Switzerland) Valentin Stocker		(substituted off) 73'
ST	(Switzerland) Alexander Frei
ST	(Switzerland) Marco Streller
Substitutes:
DF	(Czech Republic) Radoslav Kováč		(substituted on) 72'
FW	(Cameroon) Jacques Zoua		(substituted on) 73'
FW	(Ivory Coast) Gilles Yapi		(substituted on) 96'
Manager:
(Germany) Heiko Vogel

GK	(Switzerland) David Zibung
DF	(France) Sally Sarr
DF	(Switzerland) Florian Stahel
DF	(Croatia) Tomislav Puljić
DF	(Switzerland) Claudio Lustenberger
MF	(Switzerland) Alain Wiss	(yellow card) 57'
MF	(Switzerland) Michel Renggli
MF	(Switzerland) Adrian Winter
MF	(Switzerland) Xavier Hochstrasser		(substituted off) 60'
FW	(Switzerland) Nelson Ferreira		(substituted off) 104'
ST	(Paraguay) Dario Lezcano		(substituted off) 95'
Substitutes:
MF	(Switzerland) Daniel Gygax	(yellow card) 90'	(substituted on) 60'
ST	(Albania) Jahmir Hyka		(substituted on) 95'
FW	(Israel) Moshe Ohayon		(substituted on) 104'
Manager:
(Switzerland) Murat Yakin

=== UEFA Champions League ===
==== Group stage ====
14 September 2011 1	Basel (Switzerland)	2–1	(Romania) Oțelul Galaţi	Basel, Switzerland
20:45 CEST	Streller (yellow card) 35'; F. Frei 39'; Benjamin Huggel (yellow card) 52' (red card) 87'; A. Frei 84' (pen.)	(Report)	Râpă (yellow card) 49'; Pena 58'; Sălăgeanu (red card) 82'; Antal (yellow card) 90+1'; Grahovac (yellow card) 90+3'	Stadium: St. Jakob Park; Attendance: 30,126; Referee: William Collum (Scotland)

27 September 2011 2	Manchester United (England)	3–3	(Switzerland) Basel	Manchester, England
20:45 CEST	Welbeck 16', 17'; Young 90'	(Report)	A. Frei (yellow card) 34', (goal) 61', 76' (pen.); F. Frei 58'; G. Xhaka (yellow card) 71'	Stadium: Old Trafford; Attendance: 73,115; Referee: Paolo Tagliavento (Italy)

18 October 2011 3	Basel (Switzerland)	0–2	(Portugal) Benfica	Basel, Switzerland
20:45 CEST	Streller (yellow card) 35'; Huggel (yellow card) 74'; Shaqiri (yellow card) 90+1'; A. Frei (yellow card) 90+3'	(Report)	Bruno César 20'; Emerson (yellow card) 41' (red card) 86'; Cardozo 75'; Artur (yellow card) 90'	Stadium: St. Jakob Park; Attendance: 35,831; Referee: Viktor Kassai (Hungary)

2 November 2011 4	Benfica (Portugal)	1–1	(Switzerland) Basel	Lisbon, Portugal
20:45 CET	Rodrigo 4'; Aimar (yellow card) 45+1'; Garay (yellow card) 45+2'; Pereira (yellow card) 57'; Vítor (yellow card) 89'	(Report)	Park (yellow card) 18'; Huggel (yellow card) 34', (goal) 64'	Stadium: Estádio da Luz; Attendance: 39,270; Referee: Carlos Velasco Carballo (Spain)

22 November 2011 5	Oțelul Galați (Romania)	2–3	(Switzerland) Basel	Bucharest, Romania
20:45 CET	Sălăgeanu (yellow card) 33'; Giurgiu 75'; Antal 81'	(Report)	F. Frei 10'; A. Frei 14'; Streller 37'; Dragović (yellow card) 62'; Cabral (yellow card) 72'	Stadium: Stadionul Național; Attendance: 5,787; Referee: Tom Harald Hagen (Norway)

7 December 2011 6	Basel (Switzerland)	2–1	(England) Manchester United	Basel, Switzerland
20:45 CET	Streller 9'; T. Xhaka (yellow card) 28'; A. Frei 84'; F. Frei (yellow card) 90+1'	(UEFA Report) (BBC Sport Report)	Young (yellow card) 45+3'; Evra (yellow card) 87'; Jones 89'	Stadium: St. Jakob Park; Attendance: 36,894; Referee: Björn Kuipers (Netherlands)

Pos	Team	Pld	W	D	L	GF	GA	GD	Pts	Qualification
1	(Portugal) Benfica	6	3	3	0	8	4	+4	12	Advance to knockout phase
2	(Switzerland) Basel	6	3	2	1	11	10	+1	11	Advance to knockout phase
3	(England) Manchester United	6	2	3	1	11	8	+3	9	Transfer to Europa League
4	(Romania) Oțelul Galați	6	0	0	6	3	11	−8	0	

Source: Soccerway

==== Knockout phase ====
22 February 2012 RO16 1st leg	Basel (Switzerland)	1–0	(Germany) Bayern Munich	Basel, Switzerland
20:45 CEST	Abraham (yellow card) 63'; Stocker 86'	Report	(yellow card) 72' Müller; (yellow card) 82' Rafinha	Stadium: St. Jakob-Park; Attendance: 36,000 (sold out); Referee: Nicola Rizzoli (Italy)

13 March 2012 RO16 2nd leg	Bayern Munich (Germany)	7–0 (7–1 agg.)	(Switzerland) Basel	Munich, Germany
20:45 CEST	Robben 10', 81'; Müller 42'; Gómez 44', 50', 61', 67'; Boateng (yellow card) 80'	Report	(yellow card) 60' Streller; (yellow card) 82' Cabral	Stadium: Allianz Arena; Attendance: 66,000 (sold out); Referee: Mark Clattenburg (England)

== Statistics ==
=== Match statistics ===
				Total			Swiss Super League		UEFA Champions League		Swiss Cup	
No.	Pos.	Nat.	Name	Sts	App	Gls	App	Gls	App	Gls	App	Gls
1	GK	(Switzerland)	Yann Sommer	25	25		18		6		1	
27	RWB	(Germany)	Markus Steinhöfer	25	25		18		6		1	
19	CB	(Argentina)	David Abraham	17	17	1	11	1	6			
6	CB	(Austria)	Aleksandar Dragović	23	23	1	17	1	6			
3	LB	(South Korea)	Park Joo-ho	20	21		13		6		2	
17	RM	(Switzerland)	Xherdan Shaqiri (Note: Shaqiri was born in Gnjilane, SFR Yugoslavia (now Kosovo), but was raised in Basel, Switzerland.)	20	23	4	18	4	4		1	
8	DM	(Switzerland)	Benjamin Huggel	20	20	5	15	3	4	1	1	1
34	CM	(Switzerland)	Granit Xhaka (Note: Granit Xhaka was born in Gnjilane, SFR Yugoslavia (now Kosovo), but was raised in Switzerland.)	16	21	1	12	1	6		3	
20	CM	(Switzerland)	Fabian Frei	22	26	8	18	4	6	3	2	1
9	CF	(Switzerland)	Marco Streller	23	23	9	18	7	5	2		
13	CF	(Switzerland)	Alexander Frei	24	24	18	17	11	5	5	2	2
31	FW	(Cameroon)	Jacques Zoua	14	21	5	13	3	5		3	2
35	CF	(North Korea)	Pak Kwang-ryong	2	14	2	10		3		1	2
24	DM	(Switzerland)	Cabral (Note: Cabral was born in Praia, Cape Verde.)	11	17	1	10	1	5		2	
15	FB	(Switzerland)	Kay Voser	6	7		6				1	
29	CB	(Czech Republic)	Radoslav Kováč	12	14		10		1		3	
30	RW	(Zambia)	Fwayo Tembo	2	5		5					
28	RW	(Switzerland)	Stephan Andrist	5	9	3	7	1			2	2
7	LW	(Switzerland)	Pascal Schürpf	3	5		3				2	
5	CB	(Switzerland)	Arlind Ajeti	2	3		1				2	
10	CM	(Ivory Coast)	Gilles Yapi Yapo	2	2		2					
23	GK	(Switzerland)	Massimo Colomba	3	4		1				3	
16	FB	(Switzerland)	Taulant Xhaka (Note: Taulant Xhaka was born in Pristina, SFR Yugoslavia (now Kosovo), but was raised in Switzerland.)	3	7		4		1		2	
21	CB	(Switzerland)	Genséric Kusunga	2	7		4		2		1	
11	LM	(Switzerland) (Australia)	Scott Chipperfield	5	13	1	5		5		3	1
4	RWB	(Switzerland)	Philipp Degen	1	3	1	2				1	1
26	MF	(Switzerland)	Roman Buess		1						1	
18	GK	(Switzerland)	Marcel Herzog									
14	LM	(Switzerland)	Valentin Stocker		2		1		1			
33	CM	(Liechtenstein)	Sandro Wieser									

Last updated: 7 December
Ordered by Starting 11 then appearances
0 shown as blank

== Sources ==
- Rotblau: Jahrbuch Saison 2015/2016. Publisher: FC Basel Marketing AG. ISBN 978-3-7245-2050-4
- Rotblau: Jahrbuch Saison 2017/2018. Publisher: FC Basel Marketing AG. ISBN 978-3-7245-2189-1
- Die ersten 125 Jahre / 2018. Publisher: Josef Zindel im Friedrich Reinhardt Verlag, Basel. ISBN 978-3-7245-2305-5
- Season 2011–12 at "Basler Fussballarchiv” homepage
- Switzerland 2011–12 at RSSSF
