= Marcel Herzog =

Swiss footballer (born 1980)

Personal information
- Full name: Marcel Herzog
- Date of birth: 28 June 1980 (age 46)
- Place of birth: Winterthur, Switzerland
- Height: 1.85 m (6 ft 1 in)
- Position: Goalkeeper

Youth career
- 1988–1997: FC Bubendorf
- 1997–1998: FC Concordia Basel

Senior career*
Years	Team	Apps	(Gls)
1997–2001	FC Concordia Basel	84	(0)
2001	FC Basel U-21	15	(0)
2001–2003	→ FC Concordia Basel (loan)	51	(0)
2003–2007	FC Schaffhausen	132	(0)
2007–2011	MSV Duisburg	15	(0)
2011–2012	FC Basel	1	(0)
2012–2017	FC St. Gallen	28	(0)
- * Club domestic league appearances and goals

Marcel Herzog (born 28 June 1980) is a retired footballer from Switzerland who played as goalkeeper. Since his retirement he works as talent manager, since January 2019 for the youth department of FC Basel.

== Career ==
=== Early years ===
Herzog started his youth football with local amateur club FC Bubendorf. As his family moved to New York for two years, he played on a high school team there. Returning to Bubendorf, as just 16-year-old, he achieved promotion to the 3rd division with their first team and attracted attention in the regional selection. In 1997 he transferred to the youth section of FC Concordia Basel playing in their U-19 team, but quickly advanced to their first team, who at that time played in the third tier of Swiss football. After just one season he became their first-choice keeper. In the 2000–01 season, the team were group winners and won the 1st League championship, thus becoming promoted to the second tier. On 16 June, FC Basel announced that Herzog had transferred to them and on 5 September the club announced that Miroslav König was loaned out to Concordia as countertrade. Herzog was back-up goalie for Swiss national keeper Pascal Zuberbühler and played for Basel's U-21 team. Then on 15 October the loan was reversed, König returned to FCB and Herzog was loaned back to Concordia. Herzog remained with Concordia for two further seasons.

=== Breakthrough ===
In summer 2003, Herzog transferred to Schaffhausen, in the second tier of Swiss football, and here he made hic big breakthrough. At the end of the 2003–04 Challenge League season they became group champions and won promotion. He remained with the club for a further three seasons as their first-choice keeper helping them to avoid relegation. But following their relegation in the 2006–07 season he moved on to Germany. After spending four years as reserve goalkeeper with MSV Duisburg, Herzog returned to Switzerland.

During the summer of 2011, he joined his local club FC Basel, under head coach Thorsten Fink, as third goalkeeper behind first-choice keeper Yann Sommer and Massimo Colomba. To the beginning of their 2011–12 season, Herzog was member of the Basel team that won the 2011 Uhrencup, beating both Hertha BSC 3–0 and West Ham United 2–1 to lead the table on goal difference above Young Boys. After playing in ten test games, he played his domestic league debut for the club in the home game in the St. Jakob-Park on 12 May 2012 as Basel won 6–3 against Grasshopper Club. At the end of the 2011–12 season, he won the Double, the League Championship title and the Swiss Cup.

In summer 2012, Herzog switched from FCB to St. Gallen "in exchange" with Germano Vailati (both of whom had expiring contracts). He played his debut for the club in the 2012–13 Swiss Cup game on 15 September as FCSG won 7–0 against FC Altstetten. Nevertheless, the intention was that he would be goalie number two, but toward the end of his second season with FCSG, in May 2014, head coach Jeff Saibene preferred him to regular goalie Daniel Lopar for the remaining five games. Before the start of the 2015–16 season, Saibene said that he would no longer set a single number one and that both goalies would alternately play two games and sit on the bench for two matches. This experiment lasted the entire season, but in the following season, Herzog found himself on the bench again. In January 2017, Herzog surprisingly announced his retirement as a professional player, saying that he didn't want to stand in the path of the youngsters and that he wanted to advance with his psychology studies.

=== Later life ===
As Herzog silently resigned from professional football, the St. Gallen club management gave him a follow-up contract for the youth department. Initially he acted as the person responsible for personality development and then in January 2018 he took over the post of talent manager at the request of the clubs sports director Alain Sutter. Since January 2019, Herzog is talent manager for his former club FCB.

== Honours ==
Concordia

- 1st League: 2000–01

Schaffhausen

- Swiss Challenge League: 2003–04

FC Basel

- Swiss Super League: 2011–12
- Swiss Cup: 2011–12
- Uhrencup: 2011

== Sources ==
- H for Herzog on FCSG-Data homepage
- Die ersten 125 Jahre. Publisher: Josef Zindel im Friedrich Reinhardt Verlag, Basel. ISBN 978-3-7245-2305-5
- Verein "Basler Fussballarchiv" Homepage
