= Radoslav Kováč =

Czech football manager and former player (born 1979)

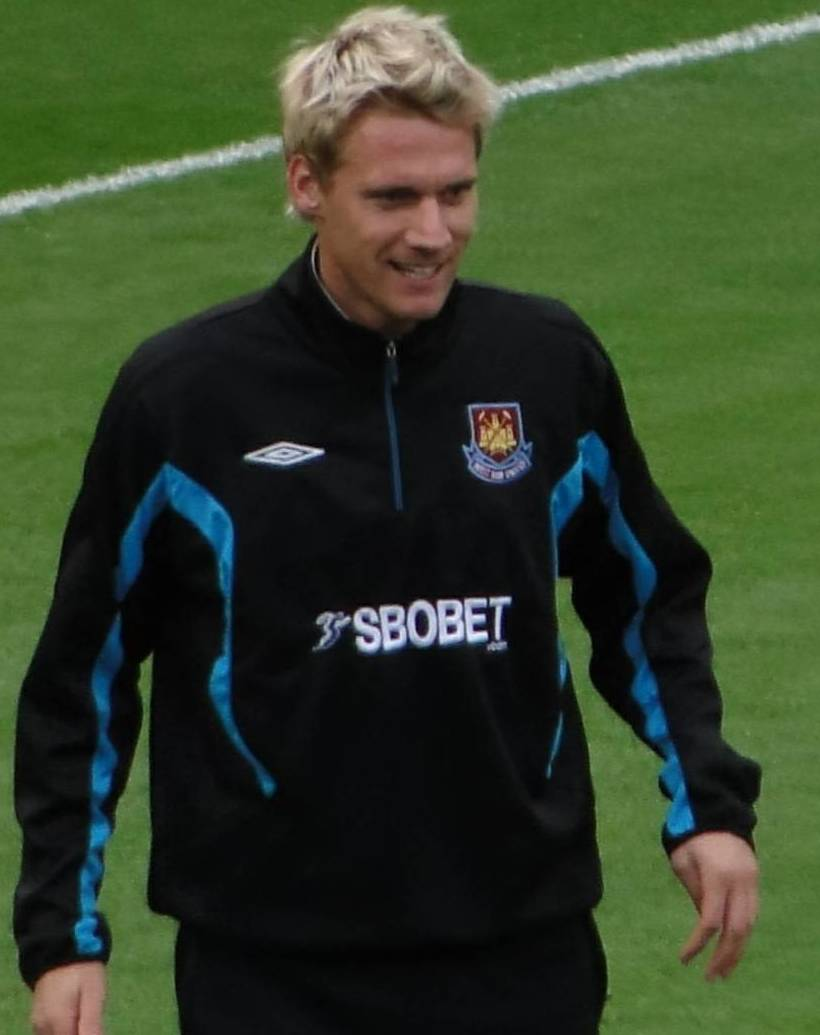
- Kováč at West Ham in 2009

Personal information
- Full name: Radoslav Kováč
- Date of birth: 27 November 1979 (age 46)
- Place of birth: Šumperk, Czechoslovakia
- Height: 1.90 m (6 ft 3 in)
- Positions: Centre-back; defensive midfielder

Team information
- Current team: Viktoria Plzeň (manager)

Youth career
- 1988–1990: Spartak Loučná nad Desnou
- 1990–1992: TJ Šumperk
- 1992–1995: Velké Losiny
- 1995–1997: Sigma Olomouc

Senior career*
Years	Team	Apps	(Gls)
1997–2003	Sigma Olomouc	127	(3)
2003–2005	Sparta Prague	46	(3)
2005–2009	Spartak Moscow	101	(9)
2009	→ West Ham United (loan)	9	(1)
2009–2011	West Ham United	44	(2)
2011–2012	Basel	19	(1)
2013–2014	Slovan Liberec	37	(1)
2014–2016	Sparta Prague	21	(0)
Total		404	(20)

International career
1999–2002	Czech Republic U-21	15	(0)
2004–2009	Czech Republic	30	(2)

Managerial career
- 2016–2019: Sparta Prague (assistant)
- 2020–2021: SFC Opava
- 2022: FC MAS Táborsko
- 2022–2024: FK Pardubice
- 2024–2026: Slovan Liberec
- 2026–: Viktoria Plzeň
Medal record
Men's football
Representing Czech Republic
UEFA European Under-21 Championship
Winner	2002 Switzerland
- * Club domestic league appearances and goals

Radoslav Kováč (Czech pronunciation: [ˈradoslaf ˈkovaːtʃ]; born 27 November 1979) is a Czech football manager and former player. Kováč played both in midfield and in defence for Sigma Olomouc, Sparta Prague, Spartak Moscow, West Ham United, FC Basel and Slovan Liberec. At international level, he represented the Czech Republic's U-21 and senior team.

== Club career ==
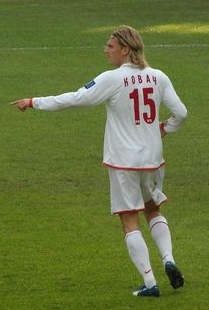
Kováč, playing for Spartak Moscow

=== Early career ===
Having come through the ranks of Sigma Olomouc, Kováč joined Sparta Prague in 2004. In July 2005, he moved to Russia, where he signed for Spartak Moscow. During a Moscow derby against Lokomotiv Moscow on 20 July 2008, Kováč received a yellow card for tackling a fan who invaded the pitch.

=== West Ham United ===
On 30 January 2009, he moved on loan to West Ham United for the remainder of the 2008–09 season. He made his debut for West Ham on 25 February 2009 in a 2–0 FA Cup defeat to Middlesbrough. His first goal for West Ham came in their 3–1 away defeat to Everton on 16 May 2009.

Kováč signed a permanent contract with West Ham United on 11 August 2009 on a three-year contract. He scored his first goal of the 2009–10 season against Portsmouth in the 89th minute on 26 December, playing 90 minutes in a 2–0 win at Upton Park. At the end of the 2010–11 season, with twelve months left on his contract and after 62 league and cup appearances, Kováč left West Ham United.

=== Basel ===
In July 2011 Kováč joined reigning Swiss Super League champions FC Basel for an undisclosed fee on a two-year contract. He joined Basel's first team during their 2011–12 season under head coach Thorsten Fink. To the beginning of their 2011–12 season Kováč was a member of the Basel team that won the 2011 Uhrencup, beating both Hertha Berlin 3–0 and West Ham United 2–1 to lead the table on goal difference above Young Boys.

After playing in six test games Kováč played his domestic league debut for the club in the away game in the Stade de Suisse, Wankdorf on 16 July 2011 as Basel played a 1–1 draw with BSC Young Boys. At the end of the 2011–12 season he won the Double with his new club. They won the League Championship title with 20 points advantage. The team won the Swiss Cup, winning the final 4–2 in a penalty shootout against Luzern.

Kováč scored his first goal for the club on 4 August 2012 in the away game in the Stade Tourbillon as Basel played a 1–1 draw with Sion.

On 21 December 2012 it was announced that Kováč would leave the club and had signed for Slovan Liberec. Basel and Kováč agreed to prematurely terminate the contract, because he had achieved only 5 appearances up until that date. Therefore, he could sign for Liberec on a free transfer. During his 18 months with the club Kováč played a total of 52 games for Basel scoring a total of two goals. 20 of these games were in the Swiss Super League, five in the Swiss Cup, two in the UEFA competitions (Champions League and Europa League) and 25 were friendly games. He scored one goal in the domestic league and the other was scored during the test games.

== International career ==
Kováč was part of the Czech side which won the UEFA U-21 Championships in 2002. Kováč made his debut on 9 October 2004 in a 1–0 friendly win against Romania. Kováč appeared for his nation in the 2006 World Cup and Euro 2008. With the Czech Republic failing to qualify for the 2010 World Cup, Kováč announced his retirement from international football in January 2010, in order to focus on his club career.

=== International goals ===
Scores and results list Czech Republic's goal tally first.

#	Date	Venue	Opponent	Score	Result	Competition
1	28 March 2007	Liberec, Czech Republic	Cyprus	1–0	Win	UEFA Euro 2008 qualifying
2	19 November 2008	Serravalle, San Marino	San Marino	3–0	Win	2010 World Cup qualifying

== Coaching career ==
From 2016 to 2019, Kováč worked as an assistant manager at AC Sparta Prague. In June 2020, he was hired as SFC Opava football manager replacing sacked Jiří Balcárek. In June 2022 he was hired as FC MAS Táborsko football manager replacing Sergejs Golubevs. On 13 September 2022, Kováč was named as new head coach of FK Pardubice. Ahead of 2024–25 Czech First League, Kováč became the manager of Slovan Liberec.

== Honours ==
Basel

- Swiss Super League: 2012
- Swiss Cup: 2012
