= Pak Kwang-ryong =

North Korean footballer (born 1992)

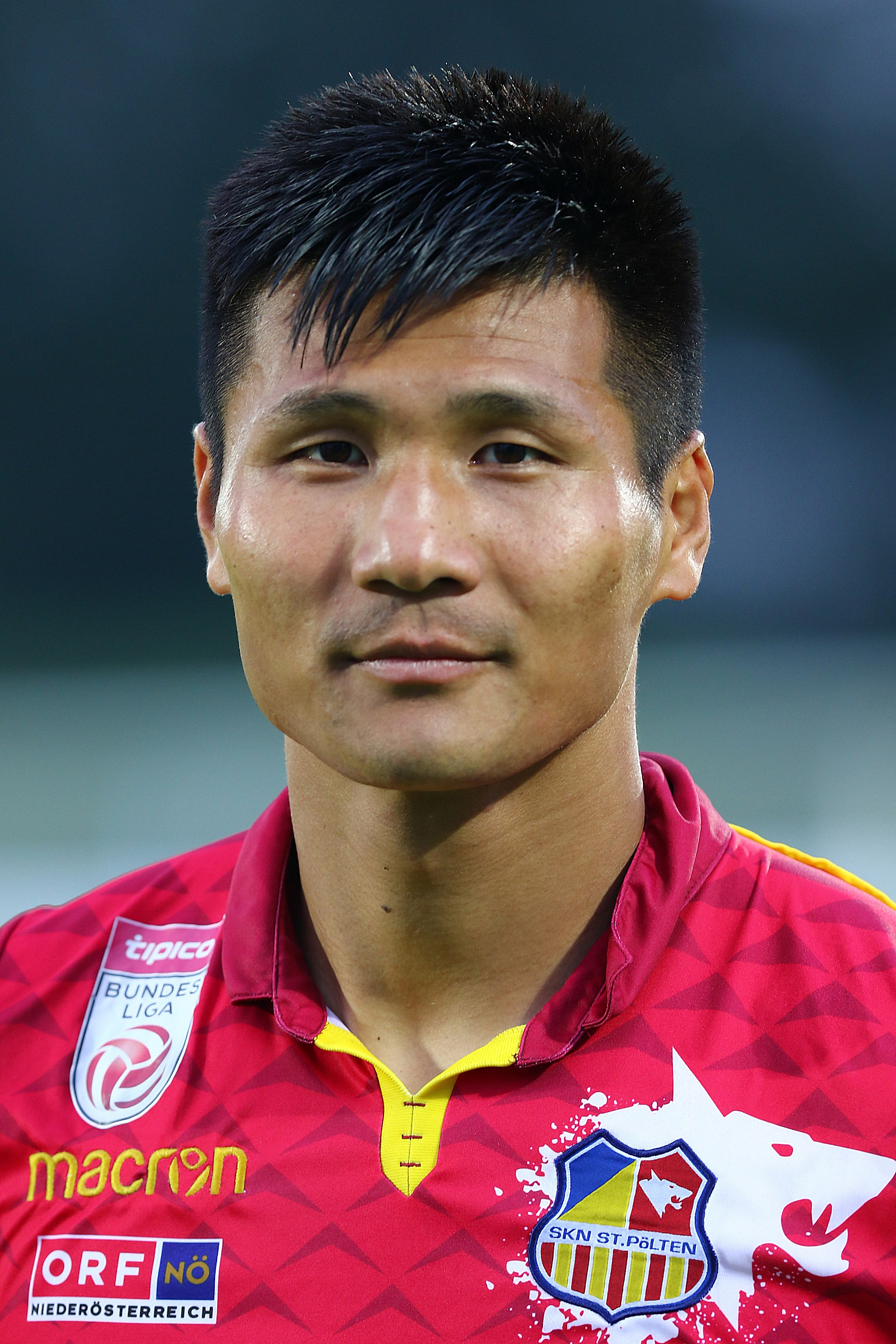
- Pak with SKN St. Pölten in 2018

Personal information
- Date of birth: 27 September 1992 (age 34)
- Place of birth: Pyongyang, North Korea
- Height: 1.88 m (6 ft 2 in)
- Position: Forward

Senior career*
Years	Team	Apps	(Gls)
2007–2008	Kigwanch'a		
2010–2011	Wŏlmido		
2010–2011	Kigwanch'a		
2011	Wil	0	(0)
2011–2016	Basel	14	(1)
2012–2016	Basel U21	12	(6)
2013	→ Bellinzona (loan)	17	(7)
2013	→ Vaduz (loan)	5	(2)
2014–2015	→ Vaduz (loan)	37	(10)
2015–2016	→ Biel-Bienne (loan)	17	(4)
2016–2017	Lausanne	39	(10)
2017–2020	SKN St. Pölten	52	(10)
2021	Sierning		
2023–2026	Kigwanch'a		

International career^{‡}
2010	North Korea U23	3	(3)
2009–2023	North Korea	43	(14)
- * Club domestic league appearances and goals as of 4 July 2020 ‡ National team caps and goals as of 15 October 2019

- Pak Kwang-ryong
- Hangul: 박광룡
- RR: Bak Gwangryong
- MR: Pak Kwangnyong

Pak Kwang-ryong (Korean: 박광룡; born 27 September 1992) is a North Korean professional footballer who plays as a forward.

== Club career ==
Born in Pyongyang, Pak originally played for Kigwanch'a SC of Sinŭiju before joining FC Wil 1900 in Switzerland. However, Pak did not make any league appearances for them, because the club's quota of foreigner players had already been exhausted.

On 27 June 2011 it was announced that FC Basel had signed Pak for a five-year contract. He joined Basel's first team during their 2011–12 season under head coach Thorsten Fink. In his very first test game against a district selection team from Miesbach, Pak scored four goals after coming on as a substitute at half time. To the beginning of their 2011–12 season, Pak was a member of the Basel team that won the 2011 Uhrencup, beating both Hertha Berlin 3–0 and West Ham United 2–1 (here Pak scored the first goal of the match) to lead the table on goal difference above Young Boys. After playing in seven test games Pak played his domestic league debut for his new club in the away game in the Stadion Wankdorf on 16 July 2011 as Basel play a 1–1 draw with BSC Young Boys.

Because he was born in 1992 he was eligible to play for the newly formed Basel Under-19 team in the 2011–12 NextGen series. He scored his first goal for them during the team's first game against Tottenham Hotspur F.C. on 17 August 2011.

On 14 September 2011 Pak became the first North Korean to play in the 2011–12 UEFA Champions League campaign, coming on the field in the 92nd minute. On his 19th birthday, 27 September 2011, Pak came on as a substitute in the 81st minute of FC Basel's 3–3 away draw against Manchester United at Old Trafford in another UEFA Champions League match.

Pak scored his first competition goal for the team in an away game in the 2011–12 Swiss Cup on 17 September 2011. In fact he netted the first two goals as Basel won 4–0 against amateur club FC Eschenbach. At the end of the 2011–12 season he won the Double with his new club. They won the League Championship title with 20 points advantage. The team won the Swiss Cup, winning the final 4–2 in a penalty shootout against Luzern.

Pak could not gain a place in the first team during the 2012–13 season but played regularly in their U-21 side, scoring six goals in twelve appearances, during the first half of the season. On 11 January 2013, Basel announced that some of their youngsters would be loaned out to lower league clubs and Pak signed a deal with Bellinzona, so that he could gain playing experience in the Challenge League.

On 20 June 2013, Basel announced that they would loan Pak to the Liechtensteiner club Vaduz in the Swiss Challenge League, again so that he could gain more playing experience. However, following the transfer of Raúl Bobadilla to Augsburg, in the Bundesliga, and the injury to Marco Streller, Basel decided to recall the striker to their squad. Pak played just one more game for Basel before he was again loaned to Vaduz from January 2014 until the end of the season. Playing in all 18 games, he scored 9 goals and Vaduz finished the 2013–14 Swiss Challenge League season as winners and were promoted. Pak's loan was renewed for the following Swiss Super League season.

In February 2014, he was named North Korea's Male Footballer of the Year for 2013.

At the end of the 2014–15 season, Basel did not renew Pak's contract. During his time with Basel's first team, Pak played a total of 42 games for Basel scoring a total of 10 goals. 14 of these games were in the Swiss Super League, three in the Swiss Cup, four in the UEFA competitions (Champions League and Europa League) and 21 were friendly games. He scored one goal in the domestic league, two in the cup and the other seven were scored during the test games.

On 1 July 2015, he joined Biel-Bienne as a free agent. On 4 January 2016, Biel-Bienne annulled their contract with Pak who then signed with Lausanne.

== Career statistics ==
=== Club ===
As of matches played on 16 December 2018

Appearances and goals by club, season and competition
Club	Season	League			Cup (Note: Includes Swiss Cup and Austrian Cup)		Continental		Total	
Club	Season	Division	Apps	Goals	Apps	Goals	Apps	Goals	Apps	Goals
Basel	2011–12	Swiss Super League	13	1	1	2	3 (Note: Appearances in the UEFA Champions League)	0	17	3
Basel	2012–13	Swiss Super League	0	0	0	0	1 (Note: Appearances in the UEFA Europa League)	0	1	0
Basel	2013–14	Swiss Super League	1	0	0	0	0	0	1	0
Basel	Total		14	1	1	2	4	0	19	3
Bellinzona (loan)	2012–13	Swiss Challenge League	17	7	0	0	—		17	7
Vaduz (loan)	2013–14	Swiss Challenge League	23	11	2	1	2	0	27	12
Vaduz (loan)	2014–15	Swiss Super League	19	1	2	0	4	0	25	1
Vaduz (loan)	Total		59	19	4	1	6	0	69	20
Biel-Bienne	2015–16	Swiss Challenge League	17	4	1	0	—		18	4
Lausanne	2015–16	Swiss Challenge League	9	6	0	0	—		9	6
Lausanne	2016–17	Swiss Challenge League	30	4	1	1	—		31	4
Lausanne	Total		56	14	2	1	—		58	15
St. Pölten	2017–18	Austrian Bundesliga	15	1	0	0	—		15	1
St. Pölten	2018–19	Austrian Bundesliga	18	4	1	0	—		19	4
St. Pölten	Total		33	5	1	0	—		34	5
Career total			162	39	8	4	10	0	180	43

=== International ===
Scores and results list North Korea's goal tally first, score column indicates score after each Pak goal.

List of international goals scored by Pak Kwang-ryong
No.	Date	Venue	Opponent	Score	Result	Competition
1	19 February 2010	Sugathadasa Stadium, Colombo, Sri Lanka	Kyrgyzstan	2–0	4–0	2010 AFC Challenge Cup
2	16 March 2012	Dasarath Rangasala Stadium, Kathmandu, Nepal	Palestine	1–0	2–0	2012 AFC Challenge Cup
3	16 March 2012	Dasarath Rangasala Stadium, Kathmandu, Nepal	Palestine	2–0	2–0	2012 AFC Challenge Cup
4	16 June 2015	Kim Il Sung Stadium, Pyongyang, North Korea	Uzbekistan	1–0	4–2	2018 FIFA World Cup qualification
5	17 November 2015	Kim Il Sung Stadium, Pyongyang, North Korea	Bahrain	1–0	2–0	2018 FIFA World Cup qualification
6	6 October 2016	Thống Nhất Stadium, Ho Chi Minh City, Vietnam	Vietnam	1–0	2–5	Friendly
7	6 October 2016	Thống Nhất Stadium, Ho Chi Minh City, Vietnam	Vietnam	2–2	2–5	Friendly
8	10 October 2016	Rizal Memorial Stadium, Manila, Philippines	Philippines	1–0	3–1	Friendly
9	9 November 2016	Mong Kok Stadium, Mong Kok, Hong Kong	Guam	2–0	2–0	2017 EAFF E-1 Football Championship qualification
10	6 June 2017	Jassim Bin Hamad Stadium, Doha, Qatar	Qatar	1–2	2–2	Friendly
11	10 November 2017	New I-Mobile Stadium, Buriram, Thailand	Malaysia	1–0	4–1	2019 AFC Asian Cup qualification
12	13 November 2017	New I-Mobile Stadium, Buriram, Thailand	Malaysia	1–0	4–0	2019 AFC Asian Cup qualification
13	27 March 2018	Kim Il Sung Stadium, Pyongyang, North Korea	Hong Kong	2–0	2–0	2019 AFC Asian Cup qualification
14	17 January 2019	Sharjah Stadium, Sharjah, United Arab Emirates	Lebanon	1–0	1–4	2019 AFC Asian Cup

== Honours ==
North Korea

- AFC Challenge Cup: 2010, 2012

Basel

- Swiss Super League: 2011–12
- Swiss Cup: 2011–12

Vaduz

- Liechtenstein Cup: 2013–14
- Swiss Challenge League: 2013–14
