= Stephan Andrist =

Swiss footballer (born 1987)

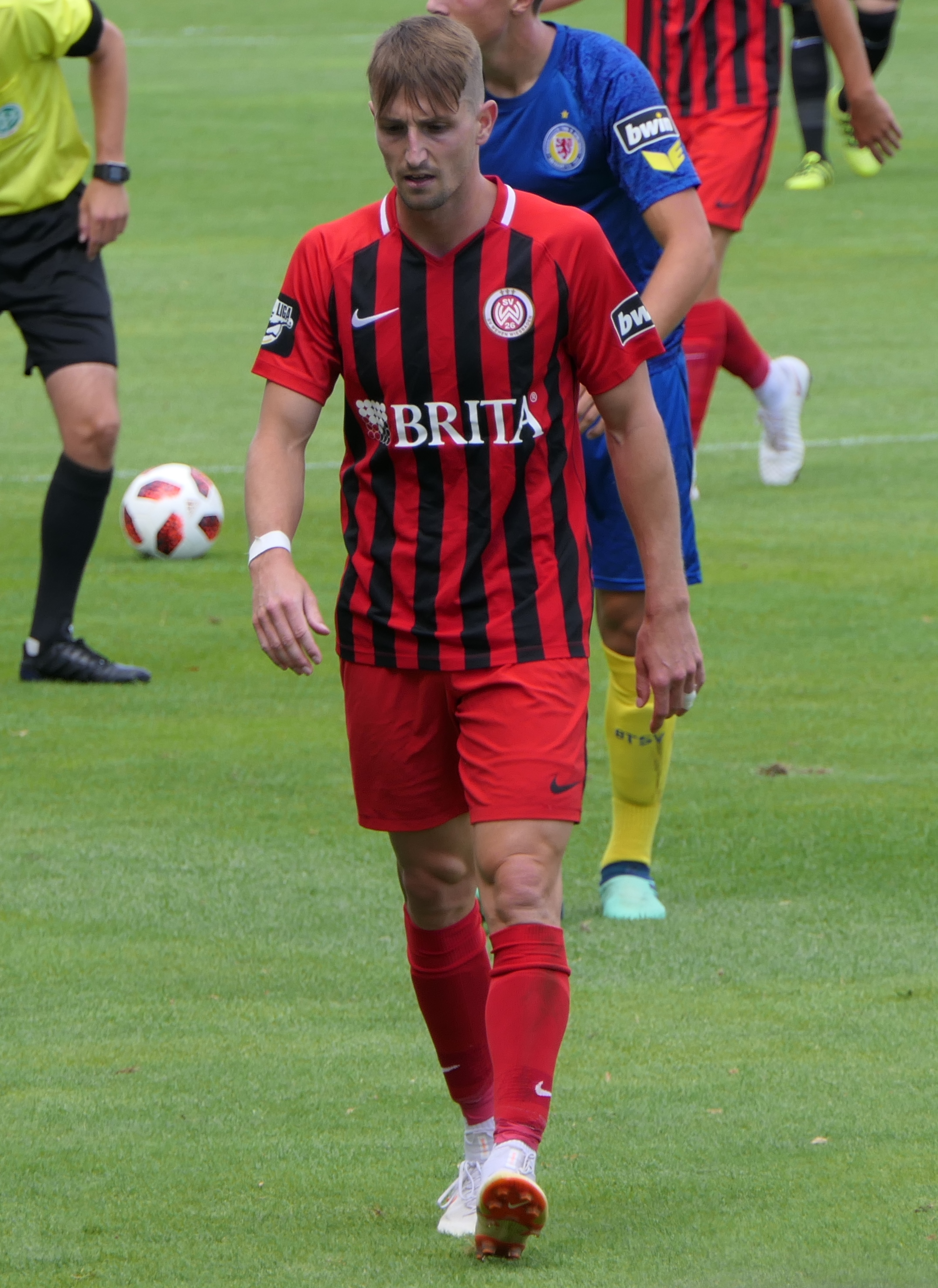

Personal information
- Date of birth: 12 December 1987 (age 38)
- Place of birth: Erlenbach im Simmental, Switzerland
- Height: 1.76 m (5 ft 9 in)
- Position: Right midfielder

Team information
- Current team: Schötz
- Number: 10

Youth career
- FC Dürrenast
- –2007: FC Thun

Senior career*
| Years | Team | Apps | (Gls) |
| 2007–2008 | FC Thun U-21 | 2 | (3) |
| 2007–2011 | FC Thun | 64 | (10) |
| 2011–2014 | FC Basel | 25 | (3) |
| 2012–2013 | → FC Luzern (loan) | 24 | (6) |
| 2014–2015 | FC Aarau | 46 | (5) |
| 2015–2017 | Hansa Rostock | 67 | (18) |
| 2017–2019 | Wehen Wiesbaden | 53 | (18) |
| 2019 | VfR Aalen | 10 | (2) |
| 2020 | 1. FC Saarbrücken | 0 | (0) |
| 2020–2021 | FC Chiasso | 8 | (0) |
| 2021–2022 | Köniz | 31 | (19) |
| 2022– | Schötz | 92 | (89) |

International career
| 2004–2005 | Switzerland U-18 | 4 | (0) |
| 2007 | Switzerland U-20 | 1 | (0) |
| 2007–2008 | Switzerland U-21 | 4 | (0) |
- * Club domestic league appearances and goals as of 25. August 2025

Stephan Andrist (born 12 December 1987) is a Swiss footballer who play as a midfielder and currently play for FC Schötz. He is a former youth international.

== Club career ==
As a child Andrist played for FC Dürrenast, but he came through the ranks at FC Thun. Andrist was called into their first team in 2007 and played his debut on 22 September in the home game against FC Luzern. Under head coach René van Eck Andrist became a regular in the team, but at the end of the 2007–08 Super League season, Thun finished last in the table and suffered relegation. In September 2008 Andrist suffered a tibia and fibula fracture, which kept him out of the team for more than a year. In the 2009–10 Challenge League season, under head coach Murat Yakin, Andrist fought his way back into the team and they were division champions and won promotion. In the 2010–11 Super League season he was able to become a regular starter.

On 30 August 2011, it was announced that Andrist transferred to FC Basel with a three-year contract until the end of June 2014, with option of another season. However, Andrist was not eligible to play in the Champions League because he played qualifiers for the Europa League with Thun. He joined Basel's first team during their 2011–12 season under head coach Thorsten Fink. After playing in two test games Andrist played his domestic league debut his new club in the away game in the Stade de Genève on 20 September 2011 as Basel won 4–0 against Servette FC. He scored his first two goals for the team in the Swiss Cup 2011–12 second round 5–1 away win against FC Schötz on 15 October 2011. He scored his first league goal for the club on 29 October 2011 in the home game in the St. Jakob-Park as Basel won 4–1 against Grasshopper Club Zürich. At the end of the 2011–12 season he won the Double with his new club. They won the League Championship title with 20 points advantage. The team won the Swiss Cup, winning the final 4–2 in a penalty shootout against Luzern.

Andrist was unable to gain regular playing time, so the club looked for a different solution. On 11 September 2012 FC Basel announced they were loaning Andrist to Luzern. In the preliminary round Luzern's head coach Ryszard Komornicki relied on the fast wing runner. But the lack of success forced Komornicki to act, Andrist became a pawn and found himself mainly on the bench. Coach Komornicki had to leave in the spring and he was followed by Carlos Bernegger, who brought Andrist back into the first team and used him regularly. Although the performance curve was pointing upwards, the FCL refrained from a definitive takeover. After one year in Luzern Andrist returned to Basel with head coach Murat Yakin.

However, Andrist could not claim a regular spot in the team, so again the club looked for a different solution and he was forced to leave. During his time with the club, Andrist played a total of 63 games for Basel scoring a total of 18 goals. 25 of these games were in the Swiss Super League, six in the Swiss Cup, four in the Champions League and 28 were friendly games. He scored three goals in the domestic league, four in the cup and the other 11 were scored during the test games.

On 11 February 2014, FC Basel announced that they had signed Davide Callà in a swap deal with Aarau and that Andrist had signed for Aarau with a contract dated until June 2015 and at the same time Callà signed for Basel on a two-and-a-half-year contract.

After FC Aarau were relegated from the Super League and his contract expired, Andrist joined the German third division club Hansa Rostock in August 2015.

== International career ==
Andrist is a former Swiss youth international. He played his Swiss Under-18s debut on 13 October 2004 in the 0–2 home defeat against the Austrian Under-18s. He played his debut for the Swiss U-21 team on 17 November 2007 in the game against the Estonia U-21 team and just a few days later, on 21 November 2007, he played his sole game in the Swiss U-20 against the German Under-20s.

== Titles and honours ==
Basel

- Swiss Super League Champion: 2012
- Swiss Cup: 2012
- Uhren Cup winner: 2013
