= Roman Buess =

Swiss footballer (born 1992)

Personal information
- Date of birth: 21 September 1992 (age 34)
- Place of birth: Basel, Switzerland
- Height: 1.83 m (6 ft 0 in)
- Position: Forward

Team information
- Current team: Winterthur
- Number: 9

Youth career
- 2001–2003: SV Muttenz
- 2003–2010: Basel

Senior career*
Years	Team	Apps	(Gls)
2010–2012	Basel U21	58	(18)
2011–2014	Basel	1	(0)
2012–2013	→ FC Aarau (loan)	17	(0)
2013–2014	→ FC Locarno (loan)	31	(9)
2014–2015	FC Wohlen	29	(10)
2015–2016	Thun	31	(9)
2016–2018	St. Gallen	76	(14)
2019	Lausanne-Sport	14	(2)
2019–	Winterthur	187	(52)

International career
2007–2008	Switzerland U16	7	(3)
2008–2009	Switzerland U17	13	(2)
2009–2010	Switzerland U18	7	(0)
2010–2011	Switzerland U19	3	(0)
2011–2012	Switzerland U20	8	(2)
- * Club domestic league appearances and goals as of 28 September 2026

Roman Buess (born 21 September 1992) is a Swiss professional footballer who plays as a forward for FC Winterthur.

== Club career ==
=== FC Basel ===
Born in Basel, Buess started his football with the youth teams of SV Muttenz. He moved to FC Basel in 2003 and played for various FC Basel youth teams, including the U-18 team that won the Swiss championship in 2010. After that date he was member of the U-21 squad and at the beginning of the 2011–12 season he was in training with the FC Basel first team. He made his first team debut in the 4–0 away win in the 2011–12 Swiss Cup game against FC Eschenbach. He played his league debut in the 2–1 home win in a match against Thun on 2 May 2012. Despite having played only in one league game, at the end of the 2011–12 season he won the Double, the League Championship title and the Swiss Cup with Basel. However, during the season, he had continued playing regularly with the U-21 team.

==== Loan to Aarau and Locarno ====
To gain regular playing experience Buess was loaned to FC Aarau in the Swiss Challenge League for the 2012–13 Season. Aarau finished the season as Challenge League champions and were promoted. Buess played 17 games in the league and 4 in that seasons Swiss Cup. However, the loan contract ran out and thus Buess returned to Basel and was again loaned out, this time to FC Locarno. Buess played in 31 of the 36 games, but Locarno finished bottom of the Challenge League table and were relegated.

=== Wohlen ===
Buess's contract with Basel expired and therefore he joined FC Wohlen on a free transfer. Wohlen started well in the season and led in the league table from the second up until the 26th match day, when they were overtaken by Servette FC and the later Challenge League champions FC Lugano. Buess finished the season as team top scorer and with 11 goals, in 7th position of the best scorer list in the League. With 12 final passes he ended the season as the league's top assist giver.

=== Thun ===
At the beginning of the 2014–15 Swiss Super League season Buess transferred to FC Thun.

== Career statistics ==
As of 9 February 2018

Appearances and goals by club, season and competition
Club	Season	League			Cup		Other		Total	
Club	Season	Division	Apps	Goals	Apps	Goals	Apps	Goals	Apps	Goals
Basel	2011–12	Swiss Super League	1	0	0	0	0	0	1	0
Aarau (loan)	2012–13	Swiss Challenge League	17	0	2	1	0	0	19	1
Locarno (loan)	2013–14	Swiss Challenge League	31	9	1	0	0	0	32	9
Wohlen	2014–15	Swiss Challenge League	29	10	2	0	0	0	31	10
Thun	2015–16	Swiss Super League	31	9	2	0	4 (Note: Appearances in UEFA Europa League)	1	37	10
Thun	2016–17	Swiss Super League	0	0	0	0	0	0	0	0
Thun	Total		31	9	2	0	4	1	37	10
St. Gallen	2016–17	Swiss Super League	29	5	1	1	0	0	30	6
St. Gallen	2017–18	Swiss Super League	19	6	3	0	0	0	22	6
St. Gallen	Total		48	11	4	1	0	0	52	12
Career totals			157	39	11	2	4	1	172	42

== Honours ==
Basel

- Swiss champion at U-16 level: 2007–08
- Swiss Cup winner at U-16 level: 2007–08
- Swiss champion at U-18 level: 2009–10
- Swiss Super League champion: 2011–12
- Swiss Cup winner: 2011–12

Aarau

- Challenge League champion: 2012–13

International

- FIFA U-17 World Cup World Champion: 2009
