= Guillaume Katz =

Swiss footballer (born 1989)

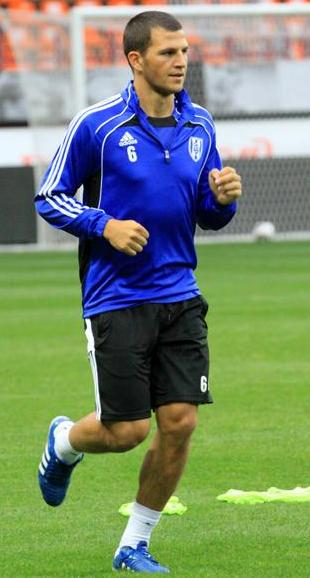

Personal information
- Date of birth: 14 February 1989 (age 37)
- Place of birth: Lausanne, Switzerland
- Height: 1.82 m (5 ft 11 1/2 in)
- Position: Centre-back

Youth career
- Lausanne-Sport

Senior career*
Years	Team	Apps	(Gls)
2006–2007	Lausanne-Sport	5	(0)
2008	Malley	18	(0)
2008–2009	Nyon	28	(0)
2009–2015	Lausanne-Sport	105	(6)
2015–2018	Winterthur	71	(2)
2018–2019	Echallens	16	(2)

International career
2009–2010	Switzerland U20	4	(0)
- * Club domestic league appearances and goals

Guillaume Katz (born 14 February 1989) is a Swiss former professional footballer.

== Career ==
In 2012, Israeli club Hapoel Tel Aviv attempted to bring Katz and Danish winger David Boysen in on loan as the club was trying to strengthen their squad targeting Jewish footballers, though he wasn’t Jewish.

On 25 May 2015, Katz wore the captain's armband in his final match for Lausanne-Sport. It was reported by Swiss site, 24 heures that offers were being mulled with Polish and Israeli clubs, but Katz was interested in a free transfer to the US or Canada.

== Career statistics ==
As of match played 24 December 2015

Appearances and goals by club, season and competition
Club	Season	League			National Cup		League Cup		Continental		Other		Total	
Club	Season	Division	Apps	Goals	Apps	Goals	Apps	Goals	Apps	Goals	Apps	Goals	Apps	Goals
Lausanne-Sport	2011–12	Super League	20	0	0	0	0	0	0	0	0	0	20	0
Lausanne-Sport	2012–13	Super League	34	0	0	0	0	0	0	0	0	0	34	0
Lausanne-Sport	2013–14	Super League	22	2	0	0	0	0	0	0	0	0	22	2
Lausanne-Sport	2014–15	Challenge League	21	1	0	0	0	0	0	0	0	0	21	1
Winterthur	2015–16	Challenge League	12	0	0	0	0	0	0	0	0	0	12	0
Total			-	-	-	-	-	-	-	-	-	-	-	-
Career total			-	-	-	-	-	-	-	-	-	-	-	-
