= Boro Kuzmanović =

Croatian footballer (born 1962)

Personal information
- Full name: Borislav Kuzmanović
- Date of birth: 2 December 1962 (age 63)
- Place of birth: Slavonski Brod, Yugoslavia
- Height: 1.71 m (5 ft 7 in)
- Position: Midfielder

Team information
- Current team: St. Gallen (assistant coach)

Senior career*
Years	Team	Apps	(Gls)
1985–1986	Slavonski Brod		
1986–1988	Dinamo Zagreb	9	(0)
1987–1988	→ Den Haag (loan)	7	(1)
1988–1991	Hermes DVS		
1991–1992	Den Haag	10	(0)
1992–1996	Schaffhausen	14	(0)

Managerial career
- 1998–1999: Schaffhausen
- 2000–2002: Grasshopper B
- 2009–2014: Winterthur
- 2015–2016: St. Gallen B
- 2017–2018: Grasshopper U21
- 2018: St. Gallen (interim)
- 2018–: St. Gallen (assistant)
- * Club domestic league appearances and goals

Borislav "Boro" Kuzmanović (born 2 December 1962) is a Croatian football coach and a former player. He is an assistant coach of St. Gallen in Switzerland.

== Playing career ==
A midfielder, Kuzmanović began his footballing career in his native Croatia with Slavonski Brod and Dinamo Zagreb before continuing his footballing career in Switzerland and the Netherlands.

== Managerial career ==
After his footballing career, Kuzmanović moved into management in the Netherlands. He was a long time manager for Winterthur from 2009 to 2014, before working as an assistant with Grasshoppers. He was briefly an interim manager in the Swiss Super League managing Grasshoppers and St. Gallen.

== Personal life ==
Kuzmanović is the father of the footballer Kristian Kuzmanović.
