= Janick Kamber =

Swiss footballer (born 1992)

Personal information
- Date of birth: 26 February 1992 (age 34)
- Place of birth: Mümliswil, Switzerland
- Height: 1.71 m (5 ft 7 1/2 in)
- Positions: Left back; left midfielder

Team information
- Current team: FC Mümliswil

Youth career
- 2001–2005: FC Mümliswil
- 2005–2009: Basel

Senior career*
| Years | Team | Apps | (Gls) |
| 2009–2011 | Basel II | 36 | (1) |
| 2010–2011 | Basel | 0 | (0) |
| 2011–2013 | Lausanne-Sport | 32 | (1) |
| 2013–2016 | FC Biel-Bienne | 60 | (5) |
| 2016–2017 | FC Wohlen | 34 | (0) |
| 2017–2021 | Neuchâtel Xamax | 73 | (0) |
| 2021– | FC Mümliswil | 0 | (0) |

International career
| 2008–2009 | Switzerland U17 | 19 | (2) |
| 2010–2011 | Switzerland U19 | 11 | (1) |
- * Club domestic league appearances and goals as of 3 August 2020

Janick Kamber (born 26 February 1992) is a Swiss professional footballer who plays for amateur club FC Mümliswil.

== Club career ==
Kamber began his playing career at FC Basel and rose through the youth ranks, soon playing regularly for Basel's reserve team, but he did not make it to their first team. On 21 June 2011, he joined FC Lausanne-Sport on a two-year deal. He made his debut on 20 July 2011 in a 2–0 away defeat against Grasshopper Club in the first game of the 2011–12 Swiss Super League season. He scored his first Swiss Super League goal in a 3–1 away win against BSC Young Boys on 9 April 2011. Kamber left Lausanne-Sport at the end of the 2012–13 Swiss Super League after his contract was not renewed.

== International career ==
Kamber is currently a Switzerland youth international. In 2009, he was part of the Swiss under-17 team that won the 2009 FIFA U-17 World Cup beating host team Nigeria 1–0 in the final. Kamber played in 6 of the 7 matches at the tournament and captained the side during their semi-final win against Colombia.

== Honours ==
=== Switzerland ===
- FIFA U-17 World Cup: 2009
