= Kristian Kuzmanović =

Dutch footballer

Personal information
- Full name: Kristian Kuzmanović
- Date of birth: 6 May 1988 (age 38)
- Place of birth: Rotterdam, Netherlands
- Height: 1.80 m (5 ft 11 in)
- Positions: Attacking midfielder; winger

Team information
- Current team: Wohlen
- Number: 27

Youth career
- 2000–2006: Grasshopper
- 2006–2007: Winterthur

Senior career*
Years	Team	Apps	(Gls)
2007–2011	Winterthur II	43	(10)
2008–2015	Winterthur	61	(21)
2015	Vaduz	7	(0)
2015–2016	Schaffhausen	12	(0)
2017	Winterthur II	9	(3)
2017–	Wohlen	11	(6)
- * Club domestic league appearances and goals as of 4 November 2012

Kristian Kuzmanovic (born 6 May 1988) is a Dutch footballer playing in Switzerland. He plays as a midfielder or striker for FC Wohlen. He is the son of the Croatia-born Dutch footballer Boro Kuzmanovic who was manager of FC Winterthur from 2009 to 2014.
