= Christian Leite =

Brazilian footballer (born 1985)

Personal information
- Full name: Christian Eduard Leite Nieva
- Date of birth: 9 November 1985 (age 40)
- Place of birth: Rio de Janeiro, Brazil
- Height: 1.84 m (6 ft 0 in)
- Position: Goalkeeper

Team information
- Current team: FC Kosova
- Number: 31

Youth career
- FC Zürich

Senior career*
Years	Team	Apps	(Gls)
2010–2014	Kreuzlingen	23	(0)
2010–2014	Winterthur	138	(0)
2009–2010	→ Gossau (loan)	85	(0)
2014–2015	Thun	4	(0)
2015–2016	Rapperswil-Jona	28	(0)
2016–2017	Young Fellows Juventus	15	(0)
2017–2018	FC Kosova	22	(0)
2018–2019	Köniz	29	(0)
2019–2020	Rapperswil-Jona	9	(0)
2020–2023	SC Brühl	53	(0)
2023–	FC Kosova	22	(0)

Managerial career
- 2023–: FC Kosova (gk coach)
- * Club domestic league appearances and goals as of 20:35, 17 November 2024 (UTC)

Christian Eduard Leite Nieva (born 9 November 1985) is a Brazilian footballer who plays as a goalkeeper for Swiss club FC Kosova Zürich.
