= Jocelyn Roux =

Swiss footballer (born 1986)

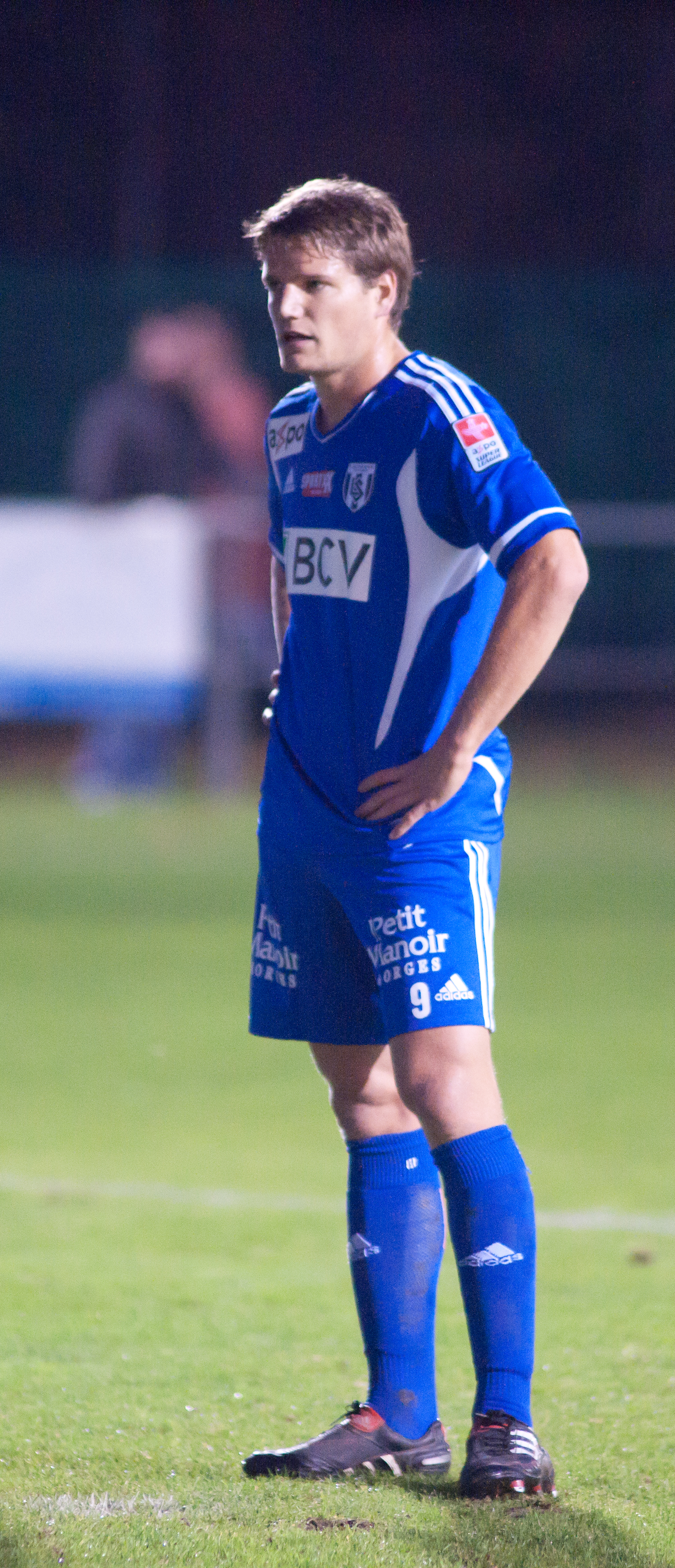

Personal information
- Date of birth: 28 August 1986 (age 40)
- Place of birth: Switzerland
- Height: 1.86 m (6 ft 1 in)
- Position: Striker

Senior career*
Years	Team	Apps	(Gls)
2003–2007	Étoile Carouge	61	(21)
2005–2006	→ Nyon (loan)	29	(18)
2007–2008	Nyon	31	(22)
2008–2010	Bellinzona	23	(1)
2009	→ Thun (loan)	13	(6)
2010	→ Nyon (loan)	13	(8)
2010–2013	Lausanne-Sport	80	(26)
2013–2015	Servette FC	54	(15)
2015–2016	Lausanne-Sport	17	(13)
2016–2017	FC Wil	30	(10)
- * Club domestic league appearances and goals as of 6 April 2017 (UTC)

Jocelyn Roux (born 28 August 1986) is a Swiss professional footballer who last played for FC Wil.

== Career ==
He joined Bellinzona in June 2008 after helping Nyon achieve promotion to the Swiss Challenge League. On 19 May 2010 the 23-year-old forward, joined Lausanne-Sport. Roux subsequently signed for Servette FC before rejoining Lausanne in 2015 and FC Wil in 2016. In March 2017 his contract with FC Wil was cancelled by mutual consent.
