= Massimo Colomba =

Swiss footballer (born 1977)

Personal information
- Full name: Massimo Colomba
- Date of birth: 24 August 1977 (age 49)
- Place of birth: Villars-sur-Glâne, Switzerland
- Height: 1.91 m (6 ft 3 in)
- Position: Goalkeeper

Team information
- Current team: FC Sion (goalkeeper coach)

Youth career
- 1993–1995: Villars-sur-Glâne FC
- 1995–1996: FC Richemond Fribourg
- 1996–1997: FC Beauregard Fribourg

Senior career*
Years	Team	Apps	(Gls)
1997–2002	Neuchatel Xamax	73	(0)
2002–2008	FC Aarau	130	(1)
2008–2009	Grasshopper	3	(0)
2009–2012	FC Basel	19	(0)

Managerial career
- 2012–2022: FC Basel (goalkeeper coach)
- 2015–2017: Switzerland U20 (goalkeeper coach)
- 2022: FC Sion (goalkeeper coach)
- * Club domestic league appearances and goals

Massimo Colomba (born 24 August 1977) is a Swiss footballer who played as goalkeeper. He is currently the goalkeeper coach of both FC Sion.

== Career ==
As a child Colomba played in the youth teams of his local side FC Villars-sur-Glâne. In 1995, he moved to Fribourg and played one year for FC Richemond and one for FC Beauregard.

Colomba began his professional career with Neuchatel Xamax in 1997. He was their reserve goalkeeper for three years and first-choice keeper during the 2000–01 and 2001–02 seasons. At the beginning of the 2002–03 season he joined FC Aarau and was the club's first-choice goalkeeper. On 26 April 2003 he scored his first and only goal for Aarau in the match against FC St. Gallen. He played in Aarau until the 2007/08 season. Because he was usurped by Ivan Benito he left the club at the end of the season and joined Grasshoppers Zürich as understudy to Eldin Jakupović.

On 16 June 2009, he joined FC Basel as reserve goalkeeper, behind first choice keeper Franco Costanzo, on a three-year contract. Colomba joined Basel's first team for their 2008–09 season under head coach Christian Gross. After four appearances in test games, Colomba played his domestic league debut for the team in the away game in the Letzigrund on 16 August as Basel were defeated 1–3 by his former club Grasshopper Club. As Costanzo suffered an injury in October, Colomba replaced him successfully for four months.

Basel joined the 2009–10 UEFA Europa League in the second qualifying round. Basel advanced to the group stage, in which despite winning three of the six games the ended in third position and were eliminated. They finished four points behind group winners Roma and one behind Fulham, against whom they lost 3–2 in the last game of the stage. Colomba played the full 90 minutes. At the end of the 2009–10 season he won the Double with his club. They won the League Championship title with 3 points advantage over second placed Young Boys. Colomba had 16 league appearances. The team won the Swiss Cup, winning the final 6–0 against Lausanne-Sport. Colomba played all the cup games except the final.

During the off-season before the 2010–11 season, Yann Sommer returned from his loan period with Grasshopper Club and it had been announced in advance that he would replace Constanzo at the end of the season. Colomba slipped down the hierarchy and became third choice keeper. Colomba won his second Swiss Championship at the end of the 2010–11 season, topping the table just one point clear of rivals Zürich.

At the end of the 2011–12 season Colomba won his second Double with the club. They won the League Championship title with 20 points advantage. The team won the Swiss Cup, winning the final 4–3 in a penalty shootout against Luzern. Colomba had played in three of the cup games

On 17 May 2012 it was announced on the FCB homepage that Colomba was to retire from active football, but would continue his career with the club as goalie trainer. During his active career with the club, Colomba played a total of 57 games for Basel. 19 of these games were in the Swiss Super League, seven in the Swiss Cup, three in the UEFA Europa League and 28 were friendly games.

On 4 February 2015 Basel announced that Massimo Colomba had extended his contract with them. On 1 July 2015, he also became the goalkeeper coach of the Swish U20 national team, a side job which fulfilled until 31 December 2017. On 10 June 2022 Basel announced that their new trainer staff had been assigned and that Colomba was leaving the club after 13 very successful years with the club.

On 7 September 2022 FC Sion announced that Colomba had joined them as new goalkeeper coach.

== Titles and honours ==
Basel

- Swiss Super League champion: 2010, 2011 and 2012
- Swiss Cup winner: 2010 and 2012
- Uhrencup winner: 2011
