= Sébastien Meoli =

Swiss-Italian footballer (born 1980)

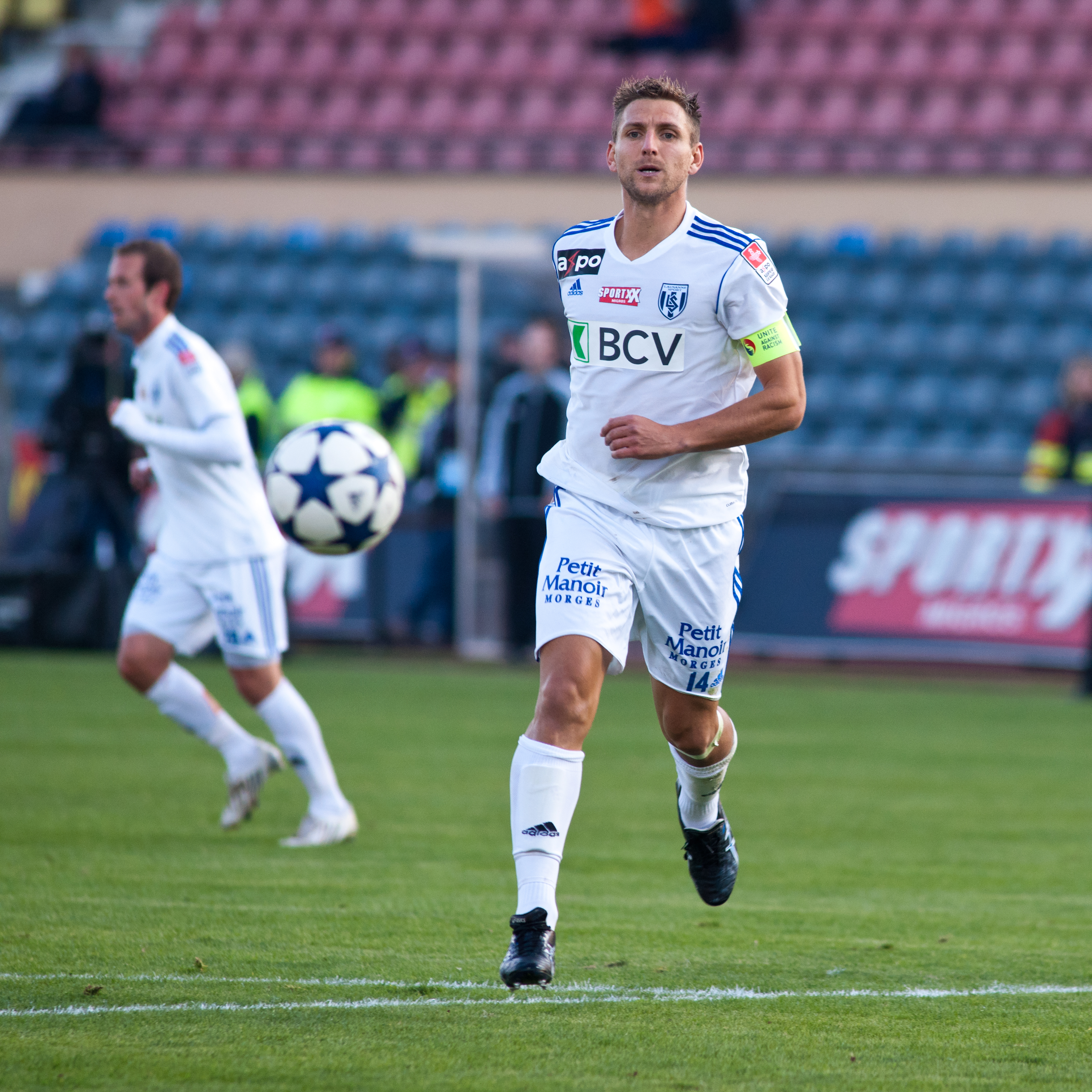

Personal information
- Date of birth: 2 August 1980 (age 46)
- Place of birth: Lausanne, Switzerland
- Height: 1.86 m (6 ft 1 in)
- Position: Centre-back

Youth career
- Lausanne-Sport

Senior career*
| Years | Team | Apps | (Gls) |
| 2000–2003 | Lausanne-Sport | 46 | (1) |
| 2003–2006 | Sion | 64 | (4) |
| 2006–2010 | Yverdon-Sport | 69 | (9) |
| 2010 | → Lausanne-Sport (loan) | 9 | (0) |
| 2010–2014 | Lausanne-Sport | 73 | (6) |
| 2014–2016 | Azzurri LS | 24 | (2) |
| 2016–2020 | Ecublens | | |
| 2020–2021 | Concordia LS | | |
| 2021–2022 | Ecublens | | |
- * Club domestic league appearances and goals

Sébastien Meoli (born 2 August 1980) is a Swiss-Italian former professional footballer.

== Honours ==
Sion

- Swiss Cup: 2005–06
