= Bernhard Heusler =

Swiss lawyer

- Born: 27 December 1963 (age 62)
- Education: University of Basel
- Occupations: Businessman, lawyer
- Known for: Former president of FC Basel

Bernhard Heusler (born 27 December 1963) is a Swiss businessman, lawyer and former president of the football club FC Basel.

== Life ==
Heusler studied law at the University of Basel. He was a research assistant to René Rhinow and was awarded his doctorate in law in Basel. In 1994, he completed a post-graduate course at the University of California, Davis and worked for the New York law firm Davis Polk & Wardwell. After that, he worked at the law firm Wenger Plattner in Basel, where he was a partner from 2000 to 2014. He then worked as a consultant at the law firm Walder Wyss in Basel until 2017. Today, he is co-founder and partner at Heusler Werthmüller Heitz, an agency for consulting in business, sport and culture.

Heusler holds various directorships, including that of Valora Holding AG. He is Chairman of the foundation Stiftung für kranke Kinder in Basel, which benefits sick children in Basel.

Heusler is married and has two children.

=== FC Basel ===
Bernhard Heusler was President and Delegate of the Board of Directors of the football club FC Basel. From 2012 to 2017, Heusler served as President of the football club. When he stepped down, FC Basel appointed him Honorary President. Under Heusler's leadership, the Swiss club won the championship title eight times in a row and FC Basel recorded a turnover of over 100 million Swiss francs for the first time.

In 2022, his honorary position was expanded to include the role of advisor.

== Publications ==
- Ein Team gewinnt immer. Mein Leadership-Abc. NZZ Libro, Basel 2023. ISBN 978-3-907396-49-0
