= Jérôme Sonnerat =

French footballer (born 1985)

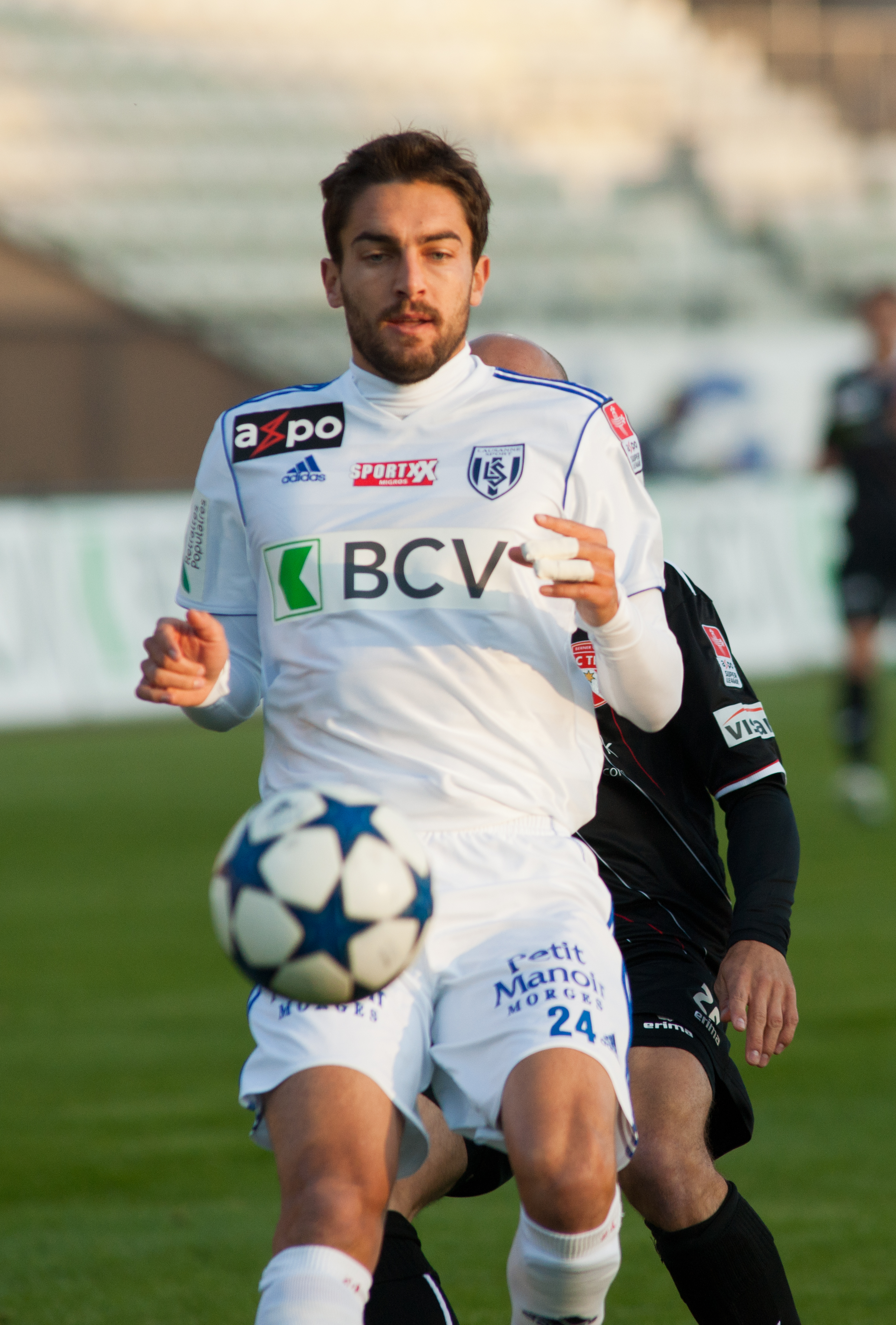

Personal information
- Full name: Jérôme Sonnerat-Deschamps
- Date of birth: 19 February 1985 (age 41)
- Place of birth: Annecy, France
- Height: 1.82 m (6 ft 0 in)
- Position: Left-back

Team information
- Current team: Gallia Lucciana

Senior career*
Years	Team	Apps	(Gls)
2001–2004	Servette	3	(0)
2004–2006	Angers	38	(0)
2006–2007	La Chaux-de-Fonds	34	(0)
2007–2014	Lausanne-Sport	160	(3)
2014–2016	CA Bastia	55	(1)
2016–2017	Borgo FC	25	(2)
2017–2019	Bastia-Borgo	48	(4)
2019–	Gallia Lucciana	94	(9)
- * Club domestic league appearances and goals as of 7 December 2024

Jérôme Sonnerat (born 19 February 1985) is a French professional footballer who plays for Championnat National 3 club Gallia Lucciana.
