= 2011–12 Swiss Super League =

115th season of top-tier Swiss football

Swiss Super League
- Season: 2011–12
- Dates: 16 July 2011 – 23 May 2012
- Champions: Basel; 15th title
- Relegated: Neuchâtel Xamax
- Champions League: Basel
- Europa League: Luzern; Young Boys; Servette
- Matches: 162
- Goals: 405 (2.5 per match)
- Top goalscorer: Alexander Frei (24 goals)
- Biggest home win: Zürich 6–0 Grasshopper; Basel 6–0 Lausanne
- Biggest away win: Servette 0–4 Basel; Sion 0–4 Servette
- Highest scoring: Basel 6–3 Grasshopper

The 2011–12 Swiss Super League season was the 115th season of top-tier football in Switzerland. It began on 16 July 2011 and ended on 23 May 2012.

Basel successfully defended their title. No team was directly relegated after Neuchâtel Xamax were expelled midway through the season over severe financial irregularities.

The league comprised the best eight sides from the 2010–11 season, the 2010–11 Swiss Challenge League champions Lausanne-Sport, and Servette, the winners of the relegation/promotion play-off between the ninth-placed Super League team and the Challenge League runners-up.

Since Switzerland dropped from thirteenth to sixteenth place in the UEFA association coefficient rankings at the end of the 2010–11 season, the league lost its second spot for the UEFA Champions League. The league champions will now enter the second qualifying round of the 2012–13 tournament, while the runners-up and third-placed sides will enter the second qualifying round of the 2012–13 UEFA Europa League.

== Teams ==
FC St. Gallen were relegated after finishing in last place of the table after the 2010–11 season. The club thus completed a two-year tenure in the Super League. St. Gallen were replaced by 2010–11 Challenge League champions FC Lausanne-Sport, who returned to the highest football league of Switzerland after a nine-year absence.

A further spot in the league was contested in a relegation/promotion playoff between ninth-placed AC Bellinzona and Challenge League runners-up Servette FC from Guinevere. Both teams played a two-legged series, which was won by Servette, 3–2 on aggregate. The Geneva side thus returned to the Super League after six years, while Bellinzona were relegated to the Challenge League after three years in the highest Swiss football league.

=== Stadia and locations ===
Location of teams in the 2011–12 Swiss Super League

Club	Location	Stadium	Capacity
FC Basel	Basel	St. Jakob-Park	38,512
Grasshopper Club Zürich	Zürich	Letzigrund	23,605
FC Lausanne-Sport	Lausanne	Stade Olympique de la Pontaise	15,850
FC Luzern	Lucerne	Swissporarena	17,500
Neuchâtel Xamax	Neuchâtel	Stade de la Maladière	12,000
Servette FC	Geneva	Stade de Genève	30,084
FC Sion	Sion	Stade Tourbillon	16,500
FC Thun	Thun	Arena Thun	10,000
Young Boys	Bern	Wankdorf	31,783
FC Zürich	Zürich	Letzigrund	23,605

== League table ==
Pos	Team	Pld	W	D	L	GF	GA	GD	Pts	Qualification or relegation
1	Basel (C)	34	22	8	4	78	32	+46	74	Qualification to Champions League second qualifying round
2	Luzern	34	14	12	8	46	32	+14	54	Qualification to Europa League play-off round (Note: Because 2011–12 Swiss Cup winners Basel qualified for the Champions League, and runners-up Luzern qualified for the Europa League through league position, the distribution of the Europa League spots reverted to league position.)
3	Young Boys	34	13	12	9	52	38	+14	51	Qualification to Europa League second qualifying round
4	Servette	34	14	6	14	45	53	−8	48	Qualification to Europa League second qualifying round
5	Thun	34	11	10	13	38	41	−3	43	
6	Zürich	34	11	8	15	43	44	−1	41	
7	Lausanne-Sport	34	8	6	20	29	61	−32	30	
8	Grasshopper	34	7	5	22	32	66	−34	26	
9	Sion (O)	34	15	8	11	40	35	+5	17 (Note: Sion were deducted 36 points for fielding ineligible players.)	Qualification to relegation play-offs
10	Neuchâtel Xamax (D, R)	0	0	0	0	0	0	0	0 (Note: Neuchâtel Xamax's license was revoked with immediate effect and they were expelled from the Swiss Football League on 18 January 2012 after not providing necessary financial documents and guarantees. The first-half results of the club will be kept while any matches in spring involving Xamax were cancelled & all results were cancelled.)	Demotion to the 2. Liga interregional

Source: RSSSF
Rules for classification: 1) points; 2) goal difference; 3) number of goals scored.
(C) Champions; (D) Disqualified; (O) Play-off winners; (R) Relegated

== Results ==
All ten clubs played twice against each other during the first half of the season, once at home and once away, for a total of 18 matches. As Neuchâtel Xamax had their license revoked during the winter break, the club's second-half matches were entirely cancelled. The second half of the season thus was competed by only nine clubs, which played another double round-robin schedule; each of these nine clubs hence had played 34 matches at the end of the season.

=== First half of season ===
Home \ Away	BAS	GCZ	LS	LUZ	NX	SER	SIO	THU	YB	ZÜR
Basel		4–1	6–0	1–0	2–0	3–0	3–3	2–1	1–0	1–2
Grasshopper	2–2		2–0	0–1	0–1	1–4	2–1	1–0	0–3	3–0
Lausanne-Sport	2–3	2–1		0–1	1–3	0–0	0–2	1–0	0–3	2–1
Luzern	3–1	2–1	2–0		1–2	1–2	2–0	0–0	1–1	3–1
Neuchâtel Xamax	1–1	2–0	2–2	0–3		0–0	0–3	4–0	0–0	3–1
Servette	0–4	3–4	4–2	0–2	2–1		0–2	1–2	1–0	0–1
Sion	0–1	2–0	1–0	1–1	2–0	0–4		2–0	1–2	1–0
Thun	1–1	3–0	5–2	3–1	0–0	3–0	0–3		1–1	0–2
Young Boys	1–1	0–1	4–1	1–0	4–1	1–1	1–1	0–2		2–3
Zürich	0–1	6–0	4–1	1–1	0–2	2–3	1–1	0–0	1–2	

Source: Swiss Football League
Legend: Blue = home team win; Yellow = draw; Red = away team win.

=== Second half of season ===
Home \ Away	BAS	GCZ	LS	LUZ	SER	SIO	THU	YB	ZÜR
Basel		6–3	3–1	3–1	5–0	0–0	2–1	1–2	1–0
Grasshopper	0–2		0–0	2–2	0–3	0–2	0–1	2–0	0–1
Lausanne-Sport	0–2	2–1		0–0	3–1	1–0	1–0	0–0	0–1
Luzern	1–1	1–0	3–2		3–1	0–0	0–1	2–0	1–1
Servette	2–1	3–1	0–0	2–1		5–2	0–2	2–1	1–1
Sion	4–3	3–2	4–2	3–0	5–1		5–0	6–2	4–0
Thun	2–3	0–0	2–0	1–1	1–0	3–4		2–2	2–4
Young Boys	2–2	2–2	1–3	2–2	3–1	3–5	4–0		1–0
Zürich	1–5	2–0	2–0	0–0	0–1	0–1	1–1	2–2	

Source: Swiss Football League
Legend: Blue = home team win; Yellow = draw; Red = away team win.

== Relegation play-offs ==
The ninth-placed Super League team played a two-legged play-off against the 2011–12 Challenge League runners-up for a spot in the 2012–13 season.

26 May 2012
15:00 CEST

Sion	2–0	Aarau
Winter 58', 81'	Report

Stade Tourbillon, Sion
Attendance: 10,800
Referee: Stephan Studer

28 May 2012
17:00 CEST

Aarau	1–0	Sion
Gashi 55'	Report

Stadion Brügglifeld, Aarau
Attendance: 8,800
Referee: Patrick Graf

Sion won 2–1 on aggregate.

== Top goalscorers ==
Rank	Player	Club	Goals
1	(Switzerland) Alexander Frei	Basel	24
2	(Switzerland) Marco Streller	Basel	13
3	(Zambia) Emmanuel Mayuka	Young Boys	9
3	(Hungary) Vilmos Vanczák	Sion	9
3	(Switzerland) Xherdan Shaqiri	Basel	9
3	(Switzerland) Matías Vitkieviez	Servette / YB	9
7	(Switzerland) Goran Karanović	Servette	8
7	(Republic of the Congo) Matt Moussilou	Lausanne-Sport	8
7	(Switzerland) Christian Schneuwly	Thun	8
7	(Ghana) Ishmael Yartey	Servette	8
7	(Switzerland) Steven Zuber	Grasshopper	8

- _{Updated 23 May 2012}
- _{Source Swiss Football League}

== Attendances ==
#	Club	Average attendance	Highest attendance
1	Basel	29,775	36,000
2	Young Boys	21,104	31,120
3	Luzern	14,180	17,000
4	Servette	10,697	21,821
5	Zürich	10,512	16,800
6	Sion	10,276	15,300
7	Lausanne-Sport	6,269	8,800
8	Thun	6,100	10,000
9	GCZ	5,659	15,000
10	Xamax	4,149	5,887
