= 2010–11 FC Basel season =

FC Basel
2010–11 season
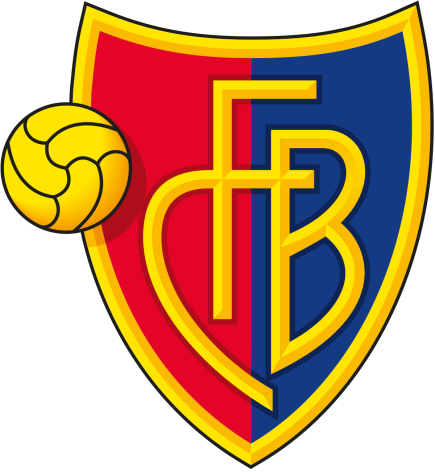
- Chairman: Gisela Oeri
- Manager: Thorsten Fink
- Ground: St. Jakob-Park
- Swiss Super League: 1st (champions)
- Swiss Cup: Quarter-finals
- UEFA Champions League: Group stage
- UEFA Europa League: Round of 32
- Top goalscorer: League: Alexander Frei (27); All: Alexander Frei (33)
- Highest home attendance: 37,500 vs. Luzern (25 May 2011)
- Lowest home attendance: 25,349 vs. Sion (28 August 2010)
Home colours	Away colours

The Swiss football club FC Basel began their 2010–11 season with various warm-up matches against Swiss lower league, Ukrainian Vyscha Liha, and Ligue 1 clubs. The aims for the team during the 2010–11 season were to take back the league and cup titles as well as to qualify for the UEFA Champions League.

== Overview ==
German Thorsten Fink remained head-coach for the second consecutive season. He brought four youngsters up from the U-21 team, being Matthias Baron, Janick Kamber and the brothers Taulant and Granit Xhaka. Further transfers into the team were Gilles Yapi who came from BSC Young Boys on a free transfer, Genséric Kusunga who also came in on a free transfer from Servette FC and Fwayo Tembo who was bought in from Étoile du Sahel. Yann Sommer also rejoined the team after being on loan to Grasshopper Club Zürich. During the winter break Aleksandar Dragović transferred in from Austria Wien.

In the other direction Marcos Gelabert transferred out to Neuchâtel Xamax, Stefan Wessels moved on to FK Ventspils, Serkan Sahin to Konyaspor, Carlitos to Malaga and Antonio da Silva’s loan came to an end and he returned to Karlsruher SC.

== The Campaign ==
=== Domestic League ===
The format of the 2010–11 Swiss Super League season remained as it had been since the 2003–04 season, divided into two halves, autumn and spring, each half played in a double round robin. Basel entered the season as the reigning champions, having edged the Young Boys out on the final day of the last season. The club’s clear aim for the team in the league was to retain the title.

FCB began the season on 20 July with a home game against FC Zurich, which was won 3–2. The team won their first three games, but in the fourth round suffered an unforeseen 0–1 away defeat against Bellinzona. In the following round Basel suffered an embarrassing 1–4 home defeat against Luzern, which let the team slip to a midfield position in the league table. In the following nine rounds the team remained undefeated, but with five draws in these nine games Basel were well away from being league leaders. What then followed was another embarrassing 1–3 home defeat against Thun. The first half of the domestic season ended on 12 December as Basel travelled to Zurich to face Grasshopper in the away game at the Letzigrund. This game ended with a 1–2 defeat and this left the club with that midfield slot in the table. The triple burden of league, cup and Champions League group stage had taken its toll.

After the winter break, the second half of the season began on 6 February 2011 with a 3–2 revenging away win against Thun. This was the start to Basel’s best phase of the season, during which they advanced to become league leaders with eight consecutive victories and one draw. During the entire second half of the season the team suffered only one defeat, this being the match in the 31st round away against FC Sion, but this defeat meant that they slipped back to second position in the table. In round 33, ten days later, Basel achieved a 2–2 away draw, after twice being a goal behind, against their direct competitors for the title FC Zürich, both were then level on 66 points. Then Zürich lost the derby against Grasshopper Club and because Basel drew against St. Gallen, they moved one point clear at the top. Subsequently on the final match day, on 25 May, Basel’s victory against Luzern secured them the championship for the second time in succession.

The team achieved their aim by winning the championship. Alexander Frei was top goal scorer for the club and in the league with 27 goals. Second top goal scorer in the league was Henri Bienvenu from the Young Boys with 16 goals. Marco Streller was the team’s second top scorer with ten goals, third was Valentin Stocker with seven goals. Frei achieved his personal aim in winning the top-scorer title.

=== Domestic Cup ===
Basel entered the 2010–11 Swiss Cup in the first round of the competition and the team's clear aim was to defend the title having won the 2009–10 Swiss Cup. In the first round, teams from the Super League and Challenge League were seeded and could not play against each other. In a match, the home advantage was granted to the team from the lower league, if applicable.

Mendrisio-Stabio (19 September 2010)

In the first round Basel were drawn against FC Mendrisio-Stabio, who at that time played in the 1. Liga, the third tier of Swiss football. The match was played in the Campo comunale Mendrisio with an attendance of 3,200 spectators. Head coach Thorsten Fink had mixed a number of their youngsters into the team, but nevertheless they dominated their opponents, although they were able to hold on for half an hour before the inevitable occurred. In the 31st minute Federico Almerares was able to put the visitors into the lead. Six minutes later Pascal Schürpf doubled the Basel lead and that was the score at half time. In the 64th minute Fwayo Tembo added a third, nine minutes later Schürpf added his second and two minutes from time Almerares also hit his second as well.

Yverdon-Sports (15 October 2010)

In the second round of the Cup the teams from the Super League were seeded and could not play each other. In the matches the home advantage was granted to the team from the lower league, if applicable. Basel were drawn against Yverdon-Sports, who at that time played in the 1. Liga, the third tier of Swiss football. The game was played in the Stade Municipal in Yverdon-les-Bains. Again, head coach Thorsten Fink played with a B-team, the goalie Franco Costanzo travelled with the team as substitute, but the players Alexander Frei, Behrang Safari, Valentin Stocker, Marco Streller, Daniel Unal, Granit Xhaka were all given a day off und Jacques Zoua was injured. There were six youngsters in the team, of whick Taulant Xhaka played his very first game in the starting eleven. Basel started slow and needed 25 minutes before they created their first good chance. Basel played better, but Yverdon held on with their players showing their fighting spirits. On 72 minutes the dead-lock was broken, Reto Zanni crossed from the right, Fwayo Tembo lengthened it and the ball dropped to Federico Almerares’ feet and he made no mistake. Five minutes later a free kick on the left was played shot from Almerares to Xherdan Shaqiri, his cross was met by Tembo who scored from close distance. Basel won 2–0 and advanced to the next round.

Servette (20 November 2010)

In the third round, the ties were drawn, there was no seeding, everyone could meet everyone. The home advantage was granted to the team from the lower league, otherwise to the team that was drawn first. Basel were drawn at away against Servette, who at that time played in the Challenge League, the second tier of Swiss football. The game was played in the Stade de Genève with an attendance of 14,150 spectators. Basel were without captain and goalie Franco Costanzo and defender Behrang Safari, both were given a day off, without midfielder Gilles Yapi, who was suspended (due to 5 yellow cards) and without Genséric Kusunga and Marco Streller, both injured. Other top players such as Alexander Frei and Benjamin Huggel were on the bench. Servette started well and they had the first chance but the long-distance free kick was well held by reserve goalie Yann Sommer. On 18 minutes Servette had the ball in their own defensive area, but they played an indecisive pass too many, Federico Almerares rushed between man and ball and was fouled. Scott Chipperfield put the subsequent spot-kick home sending goalie David González in the wrong direction. Basel controlled the rest of the first period, but created only few good chances. However, after the interval Servette took over control and with the first long cross into the box an attacker fell and referee Massimo Busacca decided on penalty here as well. Sommer was left without a chance and things were level again. Federico Almerares had a chance that hit the post, but not many other moves were dangerous. The 1–1 score remained after 90 minutes and also after extra time. Therefore, a penalty shoot-out had to bring the decision. Basel won the shoot-out 4–3 and advanced to the next round.

Biel-Bienne ( 3 March 2011)

The winners of Round 3 played in the quarterfinals. The games were played on 2 and 3 March 2011 and Basel were drawn away against FC Biel-Bienne, who at that time played in the Challenge League, the second tier of Swiss football. The game was played in the Gurzelen Stadion with a sold-out attendance of 6,500 on the day. Basel played with their B-team, head coach Thorsten Fink changed ten positions in the starting eleven, Gilles Yapi was the only remaining player compared to the previous championship game. Nevertheless, Basel were favourites and Biel the underdogs. Basel started the game better and in the early stages played concentrated forwards. They came to their first chance, but Scott Chipperfield failed to get contact to the cross, only a couple of inches were missing. Two minutes before the interval a long free kick from Granit Xhaka was deflected into the goal, unluckily, by Biel-Bienne defender Nicolas Kehrli. The Biel-Bienne team came out of the break highly motivated, but they missed their first chance as the ball went over the bar. Two minutes later Ramon Egli equalised for the underdogs, he lifted the ball over the onrushing goalie Yann Sommer and the teams were level. From then onwards, nothing seemed to be prolific for the favourites, they missed their chances. Both teams had their opportunities, but only the home team were able to take advantage. There was a corner for the home team and it was played long, then a cross from the other side and Giuseppe Morello put the home team a goal up. Basel coach reacted immediately, he brought his best forwards Alexander Frei and Marco Streller from the substitutes bench. But following a free-kick out of the Basel defence area, they could only watch the next counter-attack. Pietro Di Nardo trapped the poorly kicked ball and played forwards to Etoundi, who gave the hosts a surprising 3–1 lead and victory. This because the final attack was also from the home team, Egli’s shot, however, rebounded from the cross bar.

Conclusion

The club's clear aim had been to defend the title, having won it during the previous season. The embarrassing defeat against a lower classed team was a big disappointment. The team had missed the aim entirely and this increased the pressure on the team in the aim of defending their championship title.

Xamax and Sion advanced to the final, which was played in Basel’s St. Jakob-Park. Sion achieved their overall 12th cup title and were thus qualified for the play-off round of next season’s UEFA Europa League.

=== Champions League ===
As Swiss Champions Basel entered the 2010–11 UEFA Champions League in the [2010–11 UEFA Champions League qualifying phase and play-off round#Third qualifying round|third qualifying round]. Basel's clear aim for this competition was to reach the group stage and, if possible, to advance to the knock-out stage, which was to start after the winter break. Basel were top seeded based on their 2010 UEFA club coefficients in the Champions Path and were drawn against the Hungarian champions Debrecen.

==== Third qualifying round ====
Debreceni VSC (28 July 2010)

Basel played the first match away from home, it was played in Budapest at Szusza Ferenc Stadium as Debrecen's Stadion Oláh Gábor Út did not meet UEFA criteria. It was a clear night, the pitch was dry and the match played in front of a crowd of 5,000 people. Both sides started well and created good opportunities in the opening stages of the match. Adamo Coulibaly had a good volley, but goalkeeper Franco Costanzo was able to save it. Then Alexander Frei nodded a right-wing cross from Samuel Inkoom just wide of the far post. Then Coulibaly played a neat ball to Péter Czvitkovics, but he drove his shot from ten metres against his team-mate. Xherdan Shaqiri had the best chances, but his header from close range went straight at Debrecen goalkeeper István Verpecz. In the 34th minute Jacques Zoua set up Valentin Stocker, who slammed his left-footed shot into the bottom corner of the goal. Both Shaqiri (60) and Stocker (69) had further good chances but failed to add the next goal to the scoresheet. In the later stages as József Varga danced between the Basel defenders but his shot was too weak and Costanzo held with ease. In the 88th minute, Basel head coach Thorsten Fink replaced Stocker and substituted in Granit Xhaka who had been brought up from the youth team only two months earlier. In the third minute of added time, he saw his chance and tried his luck from 25 metres out and indeed the teenage substitute was rewarded with a goal to remember and complete the 2–0 victory.

Return match (4 August 2010)

The second leg of this fixture was played in the St. Jakob-Park a week later on 4 August. The weather was warm and dry, the pitch was dry and the match was played in front of 17,376 spectators. Basel took control of the game early. In the ninth minute, from just five metres out, Scott Chipperfield headed his first chance to the wrong side of the goal-post. But Basel needed just 26 minutes before they vanquished any hopes of a Debrecen comeback in the return leg. Defender Çağdaş Atan scored the first goal of the match as Benjamin Huggel's header rebounded off the crossbar and Çağdaş was positioned in the right place at the right time and was ready to put the ball into the net. Despite the fact that Jacques Zoua also struck the woodwork seven minutes later, it was only a matter of time before the next goal came. In the second half Chipperfield added the second in the 59th minute. Huggel was again the player that gave the assist, flicking on a cross for Chipperfield to leap in front of goalkeeper István Verpecz and turn the ball in. Xherdan Shaqiri then added the third in the 64th minute, having outplayed the Debrecen defence. Adamo Coulibaly's goal 16 minutes from time, on rebound after Franco Costanzo had saved his penalty, was only a small consolation, because Basel had already decided the tie for themselves and knocking the Hungarian titleholders out of the competition 3–1 on the day and 5–1 on aggregate.

==== Play-off round ====
In the [2010–11 UEFA Champions League qualifying phase and play-off round#Play-off round|play-off round] Basel were again top seeded. Here they were drawn against the Moldovan champions, FC Sheriff Tiraspol. The winning side would enter into the 2010–11 Champions League Group Stage while the defeated side would enter into the 2010–11 Europa League Group Stage.

Sheriff Tiraspol (18 August 2010)

The first leg was played at home in the St. Jakob-Park in front of 13,640 spectators against Sheriff Tiraspol. Due to the rainy evening the pitch was described as wet. Referee was Terje Hauge from the Football Association of Norway. Both teams started well, but it soon showed that Basel were better. After 11 minutes it seemed that Alexander Frei had given his team the lead as he took on Behrang Safari's cross and applied a neat finish, but he was offside. Minutes later at the other end Vladimir Volkov shot flew wide of the goal, but these were rare attacking moments in the first half. It was not until the stroke of half-time that Frei, with a curling free-kick, forced keeper Vladislav Stoyanov to make his first real save. At the start of the second period Florent Rouamba had a good effort but home goalkeeper Franco Costanzo was ready. Basel responded to this with their best spell of the match. Only a timely tackle could stop Jacques Zoua from taking his chance in front of goal after a good cross from Xherdan Shaqiri. A corner from Frei was met well by Benjamin Huggel but he headed the ball onto the post. In the 54th minute Valentin Stocker was left unmarked and he headed the ball into the net after a looping cross from Shaqiri. Immediately the Moldovan champions tried to level things out. Sheriff were now on top, but first Basel captain and goalie Costanzo denied Wilfried Balima and then substitute Marko Đurović twice headed over from close range and later had a shot that hit the post. Basel caught themselves and fought back into the game. Aleksandr Yerokhin received a second booking for dissent and was sent off. Following this keeper Stoyanov brought down Basel’s substitute Federico Almerares but he made amends by diving low to save Huggel's penalty. The game ended with the 1–0 win for the home side.

Return match (24 August 2010)

The second leg of this fixture was played in Sheriff Stadium in Tiraspol with 12,000 supports watching on this clear and warm evening. Referee was Martin Hansson from the Sweden and the pitch was declared as dry. Alexander Frei scored twice and gave the assist to the other as FC Basel won the match 3–0, and 4–0 on aggregate, to qualify for the group stage. One goal up following the first leg, Marco Streller doubled Basel's aggregate lead in the 74th minute, heading home a Frei free-kick that came in from the left. Soon after that Sheriff captain Vazha Tarkhnishvili received a second booking and was dismissed. Frei, with two late efforts, then sealed his team’s comfortable victory and the passage to the group stage, sending Sheriff into the UEFA Europa League.

==== Group stage ====
The draw for the group stage was held in Monaco on 26 August 2010. Teams were seeded into four pots based on their 2010 UEFA club coefficients. Basel were seeded into the third pot. And they were drawn into Group E together with Bayern Munich, Roma and CFR Cluj.

CFR Cluj (15 September 2010)

Matchday 1 for Basel was played in the stadium Dr. Constantin Rădulescu in Cluj-Napoca which had a crowd of 9,395. Referee was Alan Kelly from the Football Association of Ireland. Cluj started fast and furious into the game and Basel never quite recovered after Juan Culio set up goals for Ionuţ Rada and Lacina Traoré inside the opening 12 minutes. Cluj head-coach Sorin Cârţu had only been appointed into his position at the beginning of the week and this was the perfect start to his new job. The victory owed everything to the hosts opening few minutes and to Argentinian midfielder Culio, who proved his qualities in giving two fine left-footed assists during this time. His first assist came from a set piece, a corner, and the second was out of open play down the right. The beneficiaries were Rada, from the corner, in the ninth minute, and Traoré, following a cross in the 12th, both of whom hit strong headers beyond Basel captain and keeper Franco Costanzo. Basel, who had started as favourites, only recovered their composure slowly. It was in the added time before the break that Valentin Stocker with a header at the near post following a corner kick from Alexander Frei. This lifted Basel’s spirits and gave Thorsten Fink's men something to play for during the second half. Indeed, the visitors could have claimed a point, Xherdan Shaqiri volleyed over bar and on 77 minutes goalkeeper Nuno Claro did well to tip the ball over as Scott Chipperfield sent a powerful header towards the goal. However, the score 2–1 remained until the final whistle and this was considered as a disappointing result by the visitors.

Bayern Munich (28 September 2010)

Bayern Munich were the visiting team on matchday two in the St. Jakob-Park in front of a sold out 37.500 crowd. Referee was Craig Thomson from the Scottish Football Association on this cloudy, but cool evening. Both teams started quickly and well into the match and were looking for the early goal. Bayern took control of the game as it settled. The first chance came from Toni Kroos, but his low strike was excellently saved one-handed by Basel goalkeeper and captain Franco Costanzo. Bayern continually increased the pressure, but Daniel Van Buyten shot over the bar shortly afterwards. Then, after 18 minutes, the evening took an unexpected change of course as Basel's two attackers combined well to score the first goal. Marco Streller raced into the penalty area, he then out-tricked defender Van Buyten back heeling to Alexander Frei who curled his shot past the helpless Jörg Butt. After this Bayern grappled to find a response and Basel’s confidence grew. Xherdan Shaqiri took a fierce drive, but this was parried by Butt. The closest that the visitors came before the interval was a long distance shot from captain Mark van Bommel. After the break Bayern improved and as Benjamin Huggel brought Thomas Müller to fall in the box, Bastian Schweinsteiger coolly sank the penalty kick to level things out. Coach Louis van Gaal then attempted to strengthen the Bayern attack and brought on Mario Gómez and Ivica Olić, but neither managed to finish off a good cross from Philipp Lahm on 68 minutes. With a quick reaction, Butt was able to deny Streller with his effort and then Gilles Yapi went close with a good shot. Moving into the latter stages it was the visitors who looked more likely to snatch victory. But both Müller and Olić sent their chances over the top. Then one minute from time Schweinsteiger converted a Danijel Pranjić free-kick to turn tables and give Bayern the 2 – 1 victory and all three points.

Roma (19 October 2010)

Referee Aleksey Nikolaev from the Russian Football Union was in charge of the game in the Stadio Olimpico on matchday three between Roma and Basel. A crowd of 22,365 saw the visitors take the lead on 12 minutes and this thanks to a fine team move that began deep back in their own half of the field. Gilles Yapi played the ball diagonally wide to Xherdan Shaqiri, his cross from the right was controlled by Marco Streller and his cushioned header back into the centre was met by Alexander Frei who fired home from 14 metres. The hosts then controlled the activities and had most of the possession. Marco Borriello fired his first shot over the goal, but he didn’t have to wait long for his next chance. Francesco Totti showed skill and vision and played a long pass from deep within his own half beyond the entire defence. Borriello kept cool and drew Basel keeper Franco Costanzo out, then chipped the ball beyond him into the goal to level things out. Roma continued their good work. Totti was unlucky twice not to score. On 37 minutes, he beat Yapi and moved inwards, but shot just wide of the far post with his left foot and, following the restart, another long-distance shot flew narrowly wide of goal. However, by this time Basel had reclaimed the lead. In the 44th minute Samuel Inkoom had been far too quick for Simone Perrotta and he controlled Xherdan Shaqiri's clever angled pass to hit an unstoppable low effort past the helpless Bogdan Lobonț. After the interval Roma stepped up the tempo of their game, and forced the visitors back into their own half most of the time, as they strived for an equaliser. Both sides missed presentable headed opportunities. Benjamin Huggel nodding centimetres wide and Roma duo Matteo Brighi and Philippe Mexès also headed over. With one minute to go a Totti' free-kick was well saved by Costanzo and his clearance flew to Cabral, who sneaked though at the other end to score the final goal in Basel’s 3–1 win.

Roma (3 November 2010)

Matchday four was the return game of that played a fortnight before. Basel hosted Roma in the St. Jakob-Park with a sold-out attendance of 36,375 spectators. The two teams were level in the group on three points, but straight away both sides pressed forwards looking for an early lead. Jérémy Ménez had the first chance, but from a tight angle his shot scraped the cross bar and went over. Then at the other end keeper Júlio Sérgio bravely dived in to deny Benjamin Huggel. The hosts were looking better and more dangerous and so it was against the run of play as the visitors took the lead on 16 minutes. Samuel Inkoom did well to stop Mirko Vučinić before he could fire off his shot, but the entire defence was helpless as Ménez pushed home the loose ball. The visitors were then able to double their lead with 25 minutes gone. Valentin Stocker pulled down John Arne Riise as he entered the box, this enabled Francesco Totti to score with the spot-kick. It took until midway through the second period before the Basel’s attacking moves became threatening. First, Gilles Yapi sent a dipping volley narrowly over the top. Then David Abraham marched forward from his centre-back position, but he blasted his powerful shot just wide. Eventually Basel's attacking efforts were rewarded on 69 minutes. Stocker sent in a left-wing cross and this was deflected beyond Sérgio, allowing Alexander Frei to nod the ball into the unguarded goal. Shortly afterwards Basel again pressed forward, but Marco Streller's shot flew against the post. Again, it was against the run of play as in the 76th minute substitute Leandro Greco smashed home Roma's third goal. Nevertheless, Basel pushed forward and Xherdan Shaqiri's late goal for Basel on 83 minutes set up the tense final phase. Ultimately Roma held on for the crucial three points, winning 3–2 and climbed in the table to second position. To make things worse for Basel, during the added time Stocker was shown a second yellow card by referee Björn Kuipers and was therefore dismissed.

Cluj (23 November 2010)

Visitors to the St. Jakob-Park, with an attendance of 34,239 spectators, on matchday five was CFR Cluj and referee on this damp and cold evening was Laurent Duhamel from the French Football Federation. In the early stages the play was slow, the nervousness was evident, because both sides were aware that only a win would guarantee their survival in the competition. Xherdan Shaqiri had the first two chances and both were long range shots. At the other end Emmanuel Culio mis controlled the ball after a good pass by Léo Veloso into the centre. With 15 minutes gone Samuel Inkoom set Federico Almerares free with a fine low ball into the box to which the Argentinian striker applied a sliding finish. Following this, the home side almost managed a second goal, but Alexander Frei's shot was cleared off the line by Felice Piccolo. The hosts had another threatening chance as Behrang Safari's double effort was blocked first by Tony and then by captain Cadú on the line. Up front CFR's struggled to create chances and this struggling continued into the second half. It wasn’t until the 60th minute until the next chance was created. Again, it came from the Basel, but Fwayo Tembo's shot was deflected onto the cross-bar by goalkeeper Nuno Claro’s outstretched leg. On 73 minutes Alexander Frei netted the ball with a close-range finish. Basel celebrated because they thought that he had put the game beyond doubt, but the goal was ruled out for offside. In the finishing stages the Basel defence had little to worry about, CRF attacking moves were definitely not dangerous and after Piccolo was given a straight red two minutes from time, they were non-existent. With the 1–0 victory Basel were guaranteed at least third spot, which would see them advance to the Europa League knockout phase. CFR were eliminated.

Bayern Munich (8 December 2010)

Matchday six for Basel was played at the Allianz Arena as visitors to German champions Bayern Munich. Referee was Martin Hansson from the Swedish Football Association. Despite the evening being cloudy and cold, the match had an attendance of 64,000. The requirements were clear, FCB needed to win and AS Roma had to lose in order for Basel to progress, on the other hand Bayern had already secured the top spot in the group. Basel started well and fast. A long ball from Marco Streller sent Xherdan Shaqiri rushing behind the back four to deliver a cross for Alexander Frei, who shot the ball fiercely across the goal mouth, but goalkeeper Thomas Kraft parried superbly. The early Basel rush subsided and Bayern played forward. First Philipp Lahm played a good cross, then Thomas Müller a cross from the other side, before a Toni Kroos corner was somehow missed by three Bayern players stood within short distance of Franco Costanzo's goal. Basel remained dangerous with their counterattacks and Kraft reacted well twice as both Frei and Streller had good chances. Bayern brought the game under their control. Diego Contento snatched the ball from Cabral and set up Franck Ribéry to score the opener. Two minutes later Mario Gómez lengthened a Toni Kroos corner and this enabled Anatoliy Tymoshchuk to stab home the second from close range. Basel play stunned completely after this double burst and their moves did not improve after the break either. In the 49th minute Müller burst forward, played a quick through ball to Ribéry, which left him only to side-foot beyond keeper Franco Costanzo. The game was decided at this point and it lost on footballing quality. Bayern with another chance and only a brilliant reflex stop at point-blank range from Costanzo denied Bastian Schweinsteiger from adding a fourth. Basel substitute Federico Almerares wasted an excellent chance to pull one back. Late in the game only Costanzo's alertness prevented first Mark van Bommel and then Gomez from adding to the visitors suffering. The score remained at 3–0 and for Bayern this was their seventh successive home win in European competition.

=== Europa League ===
The knockout phase of the 2010–11 UEFA Europa League began on 15 February 2011. The draw was held at UEFA headquarters in Nyon on 17 December 2010.

==== Knockout phase ====
It involved 32 teams: the 24 teams that finished in the top two in each group in the group stage and the eight teams that finished in third place in the UEFA Champions League group stage. Basel were unseeded and were drawn, with the first leg at home, against Spartak Moscow, who as Russian Premier League vice-champions had also dropped from the Champions League.

Spartak Moscow (15 February 2011)

The match at the St. Jakob-Park with an attendance of 13,073 people was held on a cloudy and cold evening with the temperature at freezing point. Aleksandar Stavrev of the Football Federation of Macedonia was the referee and the pitch was reported as being soft. Both teams started well and shared equal possession of play. Alexander Frei broke the deadlock on 36 minutes. After a Xherdan Shaqiri corner was directed on towards Frei at the near post he headed the ball beyond the reach of Spartak’s goalkeeper Andriy Dykan. Five minutes later Marco Streller headed in another Shaqiri corner, Dykan had misjudged its flight and it stood 2–0. After the break Spartak pressed forward constantly. On 61 minutes captain Alex battled forward to the edge of the box and took aim, but his shot was blocked and fell into the path of Dmitri Kombarov, who smashed the ball in via keeper Franco Costanzo’s left-hand post. Just ten minutes later the scores were levelled as Artyom Dzyuba controlled the ball with his thigh and punted it home. On 78 minutes Shaqiri saw a direct red for his violent behaviour and from then Basel just attempted to hold on. But two minutes into added time captain Alex was presented with a free-kick just outside the penalty area. Instead of shooting, he pushed the ball across to Jano Ananidze and his low drive passed the wall and bounced into the target off Costanzo’s right-hand post. Spartak had taken a significant step towards the next round after recovering from being two down to secure an unlikely 3–2 victory.

Return match (24 February 2011)

The second leg in the Luzhniki Stadium took place one week later. Referee was Cristian Balaj of the Romanian Football Federation and the pitch was reported as dry. The match had an attendance of 14,977 spectators, despite the cold temperature of minus 14 degrees. Trailing 3–2 following their last-minute defeat in the first leg, the requirements for Swiss champions were clear, they had to score at least two goals to have any chance of advancing to the next round. But it was Spartak Moscow that started better. Their mobile attacking trio Dmitri Kombarov, Aiden McGeady and Artem Dzyuba caused early problems for the visitors’ defence with their speedy runs up front. On 15 minutes, however, it was the visitors who opened the score. Spartak keeper Andriy Dykan attempted to punch away a left-wing cross, but this fell to the feet of Scott Chipperfield. The Australian international was left to complete the simplest of things and he was able to side-foot the ball into an unguarded net. This put his team on their way in the early stages of the first half, but many good chances were not created. In the second-half, irrespective of the fact that they had plenty of ball possession, the visitors could rarely test the Spartak goalie. Despite Basel’s head coach Thorsten Fink bringing on substitute Alexander Frei, who pushed a late chance wide of the goal, Basel rarely looked like finding their vital second goal. Spartak forward McGeady finally put the result beyond doubt with his added-time equaliser tapping the ball into the net after Dzyuba had rounded goalkeeper Franco Costanzo. Spartak advanced to the round of 16 in the Europa League following their 1–1 home draw which gave them a 4–3 aggregate victory over Basel.

Conclusion

From the Basel group, Group E, Bayern Munich and Roma advanced to the knock-out phase, but both were knocked out in the next round. Barcelona and Manchester United advanced to the final, which the Spaniards won 3–1. From Basel’s point of few they reached the aim by reaching the group stage. The second aim was, if possible, to advance to the knock-out stage. They did not reach the knock-out stage of the Champions League but did reach the knock-out round of the Europa League. In the Europa League the final was played between Porto and Braga and Porto won the title with a 1–0 win.

== Club ==
=== FC Basel Holding AG ===
The FC Basel Holding AG (Holding) owns 75% of the club FC Basel (FC Basel 1893 AG) and the other 25% is owned by the club members. Chairwoman of the Holding was Gisela Oeri. She owned 91.96% of the shares. The other 8,04% of the shares were owned by a group of investors, these being Manor AG, J. Safra Sarasin, Novasearch AG, MCH Group AG and Weitnauer Holding AG. As chairwoman of the holding Ms Oeri was also chairwoman of the club.

=== Club management ===
The club's board of directors remained in the same constellation as in the previous season.

One of the most important occurrences during the year 2010 was the formation of the Nachwuchs Campus Basel, to English foundation Youth Campus Basel. This was founded by then FCB chairwoman Gigi Oeri with the aim of promoting youth football in Basel on a sustainable basis. The purpose of the foundation is the integral training and promotion of young football talents in football, schooling, education and personality. The first managing director of the foundation was Benno Kaiser and he was also in the club's board of directors. Since its formation, the foundation owns the accommodation centre which provides space for youth players and offers them supervised accommodation and nutrition. The foundation was to aid in the administration of the club's youth department. The foundation was to build, later to run and maintain the campus grounds.

Chairwoman	(Switzerland) Mrs Gisela Oeri
Vice Chairman	(Switzerland) Mr Bernhard Heusler
Finances	(Switzerland) Mr Stephan Werthmüller
Sportdirector	(Switzerland) Mr Georg Heitz
Marketing	(Switzerland) Mr René Kamm
Director	(Switzerland) Mr Reto Baumgartner
Director	(Switzerland) Mr Dominik Donzé
Director	(Switzerland) Mr Benno Kaiser
Ground (capacity and dimensions)	St. Jakob-Park (38,512) (37,500 for international matches / 120x80 m)

Source: Official Site

=== Team management ===
The German Thorsten Fink remained head-coach for the second consecutive season. His team also remained in the same constellation as in the previous season.

Position	Staff
Manager	(Germany) Thorsten Fink
Assistant manager	(Germany) Heiko Vogel
Fitness Coach	(Croatia) Nikola Vidović
Conditioning Coach	(Switzerland) Marco Walker
Goalkeeper Coach	(Switzerland) Romain Crevoisier
Team Administration	(Switzerland) Gustav Nussbaumer
Youth Team Coach	(Switzerland) Patrick Rahmen
Youth Team Co-Coach	(Switzerland) Sandro Kamber

Last updated: 23 July 2010

=== Kit ===
Supplier: Nike
Sponsor(s): Novartis

Home	Away

Source: Official Site

== First team ==
The following is the list of the Basel first team squad. It also includes players that were in the squad the day the season started on 20 July 2010 but subsequently left the club after that date.

- FC Basel Starting 11 in their 4-4–2 formation

As of 23 July 2010 Note: Flags indicate national team as defined under FIFA eligibility rules; some limited exceptions apply. Players may hold more than one non-FIFA nationality.

No.	Pos.	Nation	Player
1	GK	ARG	Franco Costanzo (Captain)
4	DF	TUR	Çağdaş Atan
6	DF	AUT	Aleksandar Dragović
7	MF	SUI	Pascal Schürpf
8	MF	SUI	Benjamin Huggel (Vice-captain)
9	FW	SUI	Marco Streller
10	MF	CIV	Gilles Yapi
11	MF	AUS	Scott Chipperfield
13	FW	SUI	Alexander Frei
14	MF	SUI	Valentin Stocker
15	FW	ARG	Federico Almerares
16	DF	SUI	Taulant Xhaka
17	MF	SUI	Xherdan Shaqiri
18	GK	SUI	Yann Sommer

No.	Pos.	Nation	Player
19	DF	ARG	David Abraham
20	DF	SWE	Behrang Safari
21	DF	SUI	Genséric Kusunga
22	DF	GHA	Samuel Inkoom
23	GK	SUI	Massimo Colomba
24	MF	SUI	Cabral
26	MF	SUI	Daniel Unal
27	DF	GER	Markus Steinhöfer
28	DF	SUI	Beg Ferati
29	DF	SUI	Janick Kamber
30	FW	ZAM	Fwayo Tembo
31	FW	CMR	Jacques Zoua
32	DF	SUI	Reto Zanni
34	MF	SUI	Granit Xhaka
35	FW	GER	Matthias Baron

=== Multiple Nationality ===
- 1 (Argentina) (Italy) Franco Costanzo
- 11 (Australia) (Switzerland) Scott Chipperfield
- 15 (Argentina) (Italy) Federico Almerares
- 17 (Switzerland) (Kosovo) Xherdan Shaqiri
- 20 (Sweden) (Iran) Behrang Safari
- 21 (Switzerland) (Angola) Genséric Kusunga
- 23 (Switzerland) (Italy) Massimo Colomba
- 24 (Switzerland) (Cape Verde) Cabral
- 28 (Switzerland) (Serbia) Beg Ferati

=== 2010–11 Summer transfers ===
==== In ====
10	MF	CIV	Gilles Yapi (from BSC Young Boys – Free)
16	DF	SUI	Taulant Xhaka (from Basel U-21)
18	GK	SUI	Yann Sommer (loan return from Grasshopper Club Zürich)
21	DF	SUI	Genséric Kusunga (from Servette FC – Free)
29	DF	SUI	Janick Kamber (from Basel U-21)
30	FW	ZAM	Fwayo Tembo (from Étoile du Sahel – 1,300,000 SFr)
34	MF	SUI	Granit Xhaka (from Basel U-21)
35	FW	GER	Matthias Baron (from Basel U-21)

==== Out ====
15	FW	ARG	Marcos Gelabert (to Neuchâtel Xamax – ?)
18	GK	GER	Stefan Wessels (to FK Ventspils – Free)
25	MF	BRA	Antonio da Silva (footballer) (loan return to Karlsruher SC)
30	MF	POR	Carlitos (to Malaga – Free)
33	DF	TUR	Serkan Sahin (to Konyaspor – 875,000 SFr)

==== Out on loan ====
3	DF	ALG	Sabri Boumelaha (out on loan to FC Wil)
5	DF	SUI	Dominik Ritter (on loan to FC Winterthur)
16	FW	SUI	Orhan Mustafi (on loan to Arminia Bielefeld)
18	GK	SUI	Jayson Leutwiler (on loan to Yverdon Sport)
27	MF	SUI	Marco Aratore (on loan to FC Aarau)

=== Winter break transfers ===
==== In ====
6	DF	AUT	Aleksandar Dragović (from Austria Wien)
27	DF	GER	Markus Steinhöfer (from Eintracht Frankfurt)

== Competitions ==
=== Overall ===
At the start of the season, Basel was entered into 3 competitions — the Swiss Super League, the Swiss Cup, and the UEFA Champions League. Upon elimination from the group stage of the Champions League, Basel dropped into the UEFA Europa League.

Competition	Started round	Final position / round	First match	Last match
Swiss Super League	—	Winner	20 July 2010	25 May 2011
Swiss Cup	Round 1	Quarter-final	20 September 2010	3 March 2011
UEFA Champions League	Third qualifying round	Group stage	28 July 2010	8 December 2010
UEFA Europa League	Round of 32	Round of 32	17 February 2011	24 February 2011

Source: Competitions

== Results and fixtures ==
Legend

Win Draw Loss Postponed

Kickoff times are in CET.

=== Pre- and mid-season friendlies ===
17 June 2010 Pre-season	Landkreisauswahl Miesbach	1–12	Basel	Sportplatz Warngau, Munich
20:15	Dengler 61' (1:8)	Summary	Almerares 3' (0:1); Almerares 11' (0:2); Zoua 24' (0:3); Almerares 25' (0:4); Kusunga 31' (0:5); Tembo 42' (0:6); Almerares 49' (0:7); Almerares 55' (0:8); Mustafi 83' (1:9); Aratore 83' (1:10); Mustafi 88' (1:11); Mustafi 89' (1:12)	Attendance: 600; Referee: Ferdinand Friedrich

19 June 2010 Pre-season	Rottach-Egern	1–7	Basel	Sportgelände am Birkenmoos, Rottach-Egern
17:45	Kapsa 66' (1:6)	Summary	Schürpf 25' (0:1); Kusunga 32' (0:2); Schürpf 47' (0:3); Mustafi 55' (0:4); Schürpf 60' (0:5); Mustafi 65' (0:6); Baron 71' (1:7)	Attendance: 100; Referee: Florian Kornblum

22 June 2010 Pre-season	Kiefersfelden	1–21	Basel	Kohlstatt-Stadion, Kiefersfelden
17:45	Müllauer 14'	Summary	Almerares 7', 25', 45'; Unal 26', 35'; Tembo 33', 46'; Çağdaş 37'; Yapi 46'; Baron 48', 50', 58', 78', 84'; Kusunga 55', 76'; Aratore 61'; Cabral 63', 79'; Mustafi 70'; Schürpf 82'	Attendance: 300; Referee: Krische

26 June 2010 Pre-season	Basel	1–0	Shakhtar Donetsk	Sportplatz Chrüzmatt, Olten
17:45	Zanni 70' (pen.)	Summary		Attendance: 730; Referee: Markus von Känel

29 June 2010 Pre-season	Basel	4–1	Wohlen	Stadion Schützenmatte, Basel
17:45	Aratore 47'; G. Xhaka 52'; Almerares 84'; Zoua 90'	Summary	Piu 43'	Attendance: 400; Referee: Claudio Circhetta

2 July 2010 Pre-season	Basel	2–2	Lugano	Stadion Gitterli, Liestal
17:45	Tembo 43'; Unal 89'	Summary	Senger 16'; Da Silva 58'	Attendance: 700; Referee: Sascha Amhof

6 July 2010 Pre-season	Laufen	0–7	Basel	Sportplatz Nau, Laufen
18:45		Summary	Yapi 28', 40'; Almerares 48', 76', 86'; Çağdaş 60'; Buch 84'	Attendance: 835; Referee: Pascal Erlachner

8 July 2010 Pre-season	Basel	7–0	SC Dornach	Leichtathletik-Stadion St. Jakob
18:45	Almerares 28', 62', 65'; Schürpf 32', 88'; G. Xhaka 42'; Zoua 87'	Summary		Attendance: 400; Referee: Sascha Amhof

10 July 2010 Pre-season	Basel	5–0	FC Sochaux	Stade des Peupliers, Bavois, Vaud
18:00	Zoua 8', 60'; Behrang Safari 27'; Almerares 87', 91' (pen.)	Summary		Attendance: 750; Referee: Stephan Klossner

15 July 2010 Pre-season	SV Weil	0–4	Basel	Nonnenholz, Weil am Rhein
18:30		Summary	Yapi 18'; Shaqiri 25'; Almerares 77', 89'	Attendance: 1,500; Referee: Dominik Waldkirch

10 August 2010 Mid-season	SC Freiburg	1–3	Basel	Badenova-Stadion, Freiburg
18:30	Schuster 19'	Summary	Abraham 24'; Baron 28'; Barth 89' (o.g.)	Attendance: 7,700; Referee: Markus Schmidt

2 September 2010 Mid-season	FC Black Stars	1–2	Basel	Bachgraben, Basel
19:00	Schuster 19' (1:0)	Summary	Baron 22' (1:1); Chipperfield 29' (1:2)	Attendance: 500; Referee: Daniel Stocker

6 October 2010 Mid-season	Basel	4–0	Saint-Louis Neuweg	Gigersloch, Dornach
19:00	Unal 11' (1:0); Almerares 20' (2:0); Chipperfield 27' (3:0); Almerares 44' (4:0)	Summary		Attendance: 500; Referee: Claudio Circhetta

6 October 2010 Mid-season	SC Dornach	0–3	Basel	Gigersloch, Dornach
20:00		Summary	22' (0:1) Baron; 34' (0:2) Chipperfield; 39' (0:3) Baron	Attendance: 500; Referee: Claudio Circhetta

=== Winterbreak and mid-season friendlies ===
7 January 2011 Winterbreak	Basel	3–1	Karlsruher SC	Sports facilities St. Jakob, Münchenstein
15:00	Stocker 2' (1:0); Almerares 57' (2:0); Almerares 62' (3:0)	Summary	35' (1:1) Buckley	Attendance: 600; Referee: Adrien Jaccottet

9 January 2011 Winter break	Basel	0–4	Borussia Dortmund	St. Jakob Stadium, Basel
14:00		Summary	45' (0:1) Lewandowski; 61' (0:2) Şahin; 70' (0:3) Da Silva; 88' (0:4) Ginczek	Attendance: 12,788; Referee: Nikolaj Hänni

12 January 2011 Training camp test	Basel	2–1	ADO Den Haag	Marbella Football Center, Marbella
16:00	Huggel 56' (1:1); Streller 62' (2:1)	Summary	45+1' (0:1) Derijck	Attendance: 70; Referee: Juan Francisco Caravaca

13 January 2011 Training camp test	Basel	2–1	Roda JC	Marbella Football Center, Marbella
16:00	A. Frei 58' (1:1); Sandro Wieser 73' (2:1)	Summary	8' (0:1) Janssen	Attendance: 80; Referee: Juan Francisco Caravaca

15 January 2011 Training camp test	Basel	5–0	Club Brugge KV	Marbella Football Center, Marbella
10:30	Tembo 5' (1:0); Kusunga 34' (2:0); Huggel 64' (3:0); Baron 71' (4:0); Baron 89' (5:0)	Summary		Attendance: 30; Referee: Sebastian Bortolotti

19 January 2011 Training camp test	Basel	0–0	Lech Poznań	Marbella Football Center, Marbella
16:00		Summary	(penalty missed) 14′	Attendance: 80

22 January 2011 Winterbreak	Lausanne-Sport	5–2	Basel	Olympique de la Pontaise, Lausanne
14:30	Moussilou 24' (1:1); Pasche 41' (2:2); Avanzini 59' (3:2); Moussilou 61' (4:2); Avanzini 78' (5:2)	Summary	12' (0:1) Streller; 35' (1:2) Stocker	Attendance: played behind closed doors Referee: Reto Walker

26 January 2011 winterbreak	Basel	3–0	FC Wohlen	Sports facilities St. Jakob, Münchenstein
15:00	Shaqiri 11' (1:0); Kusunga 19' (2:0); A. Frei 27' (3:0)	Summary		Attendance: 100; Referee: Marco Speranda

29 January 2011 Winterbreak	Basel	6–0	Yverdon-Sports	Sports facilities St. Jakob, Münchenstein
14:30	Streller 16' (1:0); A. Frei 21' (2:0); Streller 28' (3:0); G. Xhaka 45' (4:0); A. Frei 60' (pen. 5:0); Shaqiri 80' (6:0)	Summary	(penalty missed) 8′ Dabo	Attendance: 700; Referee: Dejan Starovlah

24 March 2011 Mid-season	SV Muttenz	3–2	Basel	Margelacker, Muttenz
19:00	Jegge 40' (1:1); Biancavilla 54' (2:1); Shashivari 61' (3:1)	Summary	23' (0:1) Steinhöfer; 77' (3:2) Baron	Attendance: 1,100; Referee: Adrien Jaccottet

27 April 2011 Mid-season	Basel	1–1	FC Wohlen	Leichtathletik-Stadion St. Jakob, Basel
16:00	Shaqiri 41' (1:0)	Summary	80' (1:1) Roduner	Attendance: 300; Referee: Pascal Erlachner

4 May 2011 Mid-season	FC Liestal	0–8	Basel	Gitterli, Liestal
18:00		Summary	1' (0:1) A. Frei; 8' (0:2) A. Frei; 17' (0:3) Streller; 32' (0:4) Zoua; 48' (0:5) Baron; 53' (0:6) Shaqiri; 70' (0:7) Buess; 77' (0:8) Deza	Attendance: 700; Referee: Fedayi San
Note: Test player Jean Deza played his second game for Basel, he later signed for MŠK Žilina.

=== Swiss Super League ===
==== First half of season ====
20 July 2010 Round 1	Basel	3–2	Zurich	St. Jakob-Park, Basel
20:15	Frei 18' (1:1); Shaqiri (yellow card) 30'; Çağdaş (yellow card) 38'; Zoua 45' (2:2); Kusunga (yellow card) 50'; Stocker (yellow card) 56'; Frei (yellow card) 69'; Frei 80' (3:2)	Summary	13' (0:1) Teixeira; (yellow card) 29' Zouaghi; 36' (1:2) Djurić; (yellow card) 76' Margairaz	Attendance: 30,520; Referee: (Switzerland) Sascha Kever

24 July 2010 Round 2	Sion	1–2	Basel	Stade Tourbillon, Sion
17:45	Dingsdag 19' (1:1)	Summary	13' (0:1) Frei; (yellow card) 19' Costanzo; (yellow card) 57' Safari; (yellow card) 75' Cabral; (yellow card) 78' Stocker; 90+3' (1:2) D. Abraham	Attendance: 13,200; Referee: (Switzerland) Jérôme Laperrière

1 August 2010 Round 3	Basel	3–0	St. Gallen	St. Jakob-Park, Basel
16:00	Frei 20' (1:0); Yapi 27' (2:0); Almerares 81' (3:0)	Summary	(yellow card) 49' Winter	Attendance: 27,813; Referee: (Switzerland) Alain Bieri

7 August 2010 Round 4	Bellinzona	1–0	Basel	Stadio Comunale Bellinzona, Bellinzona
17:45	Lustrinelli 52' (1:0); Ciarrocchi (yellow card) 56'; La Rocca (yellow card) 72'; Mihajlovic (yellow card) 90+4'	Summary	(yellow card) 32' Safari; (yellow card) 84' Ferati	Attendance: 4,600; Referee: (Switzerland) Daniel Wermelinger

14 August 2010 Round 5	Basel	1–4	Luzern	St. Jakob-Park, Basel
17:45	Chipperfield (yellow card) 45'; Costanzo (red card) 52'; Tembo 90' (1:4) (yellow card) 64'	Summary	13' (0:1) Gygax; (yellow card) 25' Puljić; (yellow card) 31' Ferreira; 33' (0:2) Yakin; 55' (pen. 0:3) Yakin; (yellow card) 59' Lustenberger; (yellow card) 64' Gygax; (yellow card) 66' Zibung; 72' (0:4) Pacar	Attendance: 29,049; Referee: (Switzerland) Massimo Busacca

21 August 2010 Round 6	Thun	1–1	Basel	Stadion Lachen, Thun
17:45	Rama 85' (1:1); Rama (yellow card) 86'; Schneider (yellow card) 89'; Andrist (yellow card) 90'	Summary	(yellow card) 50' Ferati; (yellow card) 70' Almerares; 81' (0:1) Schürpf; (yellow card) 90' Abraham	Attendance: 7,100; Referee: (Switzerland) Stephan Studer

28 August 2010 Round 7	Basel	4–1	Neuchatel	St. Jakob-Park, Basel
17:45	Çağdaş (yellow card) 22'; Streller 26' (1:0); Frei 36' (2:0); Frei 53' (3:0); Frei 65' (4:0)	Summary	(yellow card) 38' Nuzzolo; (yellow card) 65' Wüthrich; (yellow card) 66' Kuljić; 77' (4:1) Gohou	Attendance: 27,063; Referee: (Switzerland) Alain Bieri

12 September 2010 Round 8	Young Boys	2–2	Basel	Wankdorf, Bern
16:00	Jemal 4' (1:0); Degen 22' (2:0)	Summary	39' (2:1) Frei; 74' (2:2) Chipperfield	Attendance: 25,772; Referee: (Switzerland) Stephan Studer

22 September 2010 Round 9	Basel	2–2	Grasshopper	St. Jakob-Park, Basel
19:45	(yellow card) 3'; D. Abraham 34' (1:1); Streller 44' (2:1); (yellow card) 70'; (yellow card) 73' (yellow card)	Summary	8' (0:1) Menezes; (yellow card) 43'; 51' (2:2) Emeghara; (yellow card) 64'; (yellow card) 80'; (yellow card) 90+4'	Attendance: 28,274; Referee: (Switzerland) Sascha Kever

25 September 2010 Round 10	Zurich	1–4	Basel	Letzigrund, Zürich
17:45	Margairaz 51' (1:3)	Summary	10' (0:1) Inkoom; 44' (0:2) Streller; 46' (0:3) Stocker; 67' (1:4) Streller	Attendance: 12,700; Referee: (Switzerland) Jérôme Laperrière

3 October 2010 Round 11	Basel	1–1	Sion	St. Jakob-Park, Basel
16:00	Stocker 67'	Summary	(yellow card) 33' (red card) Ogăraru; 43' Bühler	Attendance: 29,033; Referee: (Switzerland) Nikolaj Hänni

24 October 2010 Round 12	St. Gallen	1–3	Basel	AFG Arena, St. Gallen
16:00	Frei 83' (1:3)	Summary	8' (0:1) Streller; 37' (0:2) Streller; 76' (0:3) Streller	Attendance: 15,070; Referee: (Switzerland) Bernhard Brugger

30 October 2010 Round 13	Basel	3–1	Bellinzona	St. Jakob-Park, Basel
17:45	Chipperfield 30' (1:0); Almerares 41' (2:0); Chipperfield 54' (3:0) (yellow card)	Summary	(yellow card) 37' Edusei; (yellow card) 42' Mihoubi; 61' (3:1) Feltscher; (yellow card) 70' Lustrinelli; (yellow card) 89' Mattila	Attendance: 27,780; Referee: (Switzerland) Bruno Grossen

7 November 2010 Round 14	Luzern	1–1	Basel	Stadion Allmend, Luzern
12:45	Veskovac (yellow card) 25'; Kibebe (yellow card) 45'; Pulji (yellow card) 53'; Ferreira 64' (1:0); Luqmon (yellow card) 92'	Summary	(yellow card) 25' Stocker; (yellow card) 54' Tembo; (yellow card) 90+2' Abraham; 90+4' (1:1) Almerares; (yellow card) 90+4' Almerares	Attendance: 8,700; Referee: (Switzerland) Stephan Studer
Note: Game interrupted for almost 6 minutes after 8 minutes play, because hundreds of tennis balls from the FCB fan sector flew onto the terrain (protest against the early play-off time, due to a tennis match).

13 November 2010 Round 15	Basel	1–3	Thun	St. Jakob-Park, Basel
17:45	Inkoom (yellow card) 5'; Zanni (yellow card) 50'; Abraham (yellow card) 51'; Chipperfield 61' (1:2); Yapi (red card) 67'	Summary	8' (pen. 0:1) Scarione; 27' (0:2) Proschwitz; (yellow card) 59' Taljević; 76' (1:3) Taljević	Attendance: 29,670; Referee: (Switzerland) Dietmar Drabek

27 November 2010 Round 16	Neuchâtel	1–2	Basel	Stade de la Maladière, Neuchâtel
17:45	Nuzzolo 43' (1:0)	Summary	63' (1:1) Almerares; 79' (1:2) Valentin Stocker	Attendance: 3,988; Referee: (Switzerland) Daniel Wermelinger

5 December 2010 Round 17	Basel	3–1	Young Boys	St. Jakob-Park, Basel
16:00	Frei 52' (1:1); Shaqiri 68' (2:1); Frei 77' (3:1)	Summary	41' (0:1) Doubai	Attendance: 30,499; Referee: (Switzerland) Claudio Circhetta

12 December 2010 Round 18	Grasshopper	2–1	Basel	Letzigrund, Zürich
16:00	Emeghara 12' (1:0); Emeghara 14' (2:0)	Summary	80' (2:1) Streller; (yellow card) 59' (yellow-red card) 87' Tembo	Attendance: 7,700; Referee: (Switzerland) Stephan Studer

==== Second half of season ====
6 February 2011 Round 19	Thun	2–3	Basel	Stadion Lachen, Thun
16:00	Scarione 19' (1:0); Lezcano 92' (2:3)	Summary	50' (1:1) Stocker; 57' (1:2) Abraham; 71' (1:3) Frei	Attendance: 6,100; Referee: (Switzerland) Cyril Zimmermann

12 February 2011 Round 20	Basel	3–0	St. Gallen	St. Jakob-Park, Basel
17:45	Huggel 11' (1:0); Frei 40' (2:0); Abraham 86' (3:0)	Summary		Attendance: 26,534; Referee: (Switzerland) Massimo Busacca

20 February 2011 Round 21	Basel	1–0	Sion	St. Jakob-Park, Basel
16:00	Shaqiri 61' (1:0); Stocker (yellow card) 88'	Summary	(yellow card) 16' Sio; (yellow card) 28' Dingsdag; (yellow card) 87' Ogăraru; (yellow card) 90+4' Marin	Attendance: 25,349; Referee: (Switzerland) Stephan Studer

27 February 2011 Round 22	Luzern	0–1	Basel	Stadion Gersag, Lucerne
16:00	Zverotić (yellow card) 56'; H. Yakin (yellow card) 70'; Puljić (yellow card) 90+4'; Zibung (yellow card) 90+6'	Summary	14' (0:1) A. Frei; (yellow card) 80' A. Frei; (yellow card) 90+1' Steinhöfer; (yellow card) 90+3' Yapi; (yellow card) 90+3' Chipperfield; (yellow card) 90+4' Dragović	Attendance: 8,700; Referee: (Switzerland) Alain Bieri

6 March 2011 Round 23	Basel	3–1	Zurich	St. Jakob-Park, Basel
16:00	Cabral (yellow card) 40'; Zoua 50' (1:1); A. Frei 61' (2:1); A. Frei (yellow card) 62'; G. Xhaka (yellow card) 65'; Costanzo (yellow card) 68'; Shaqiri (yellow card) 72'; Streller (yellow card) 78'; A. Frei 89' (3:1)	Summary	2' (0:1) Chermiti; (yellow card) 19' Stahel; (yellow card) 21' Mehmedi; (yellow card) 34' Djuric; (yellow card) 75' Zouaghi	Attendance: 30,418; Referee: (Switzerland) Stephan Studer

13 March 2011 Round 24	AC Bellinzona	0–4	Basel	Stadio Comunale, Bellinzona
16:00	Mihajlovic (yellow card) 24'; Diana (yellow card) 42'; Pergl (yellow card) 42'	Summary	9' (0:1) Shaqiri; 21' (0:2) Zoua; (yellow card) 42' Chipperfield; 55' (0:3) Stocker; 64' (0:4) Stocker	Attendance: 2,563; Referee: (Switzerland) Patrick Graf

20 March 2011 Round 25	Grasshopper Club Zürich	1–2	Basel	Letzigrund, Zürich
16:00	Emeghara (yellow card) 31'; Toko 65' (1:1); Zuber (yellow card) 85'	Summary	(yellow card) 20' Stocker; 43' (0:1) Streller; (yellow card) 48' Yapi; (yellow card) 70' Chipperfield; 81' (1:2) Frei; (yellow card) 85' Streller	Attendance: 8,500; Referee: (Switzerland) Alain Bieri

2 April 2011 Round 26	Basel	1–0	Neuchâtel Xamax	St. Jakob-Park, Basel
17:45	Unal (yellow card) 10'; Frei 39' (1:0); Abraham (yellow card) 41'; Steinhöfer (yellow card) 91'	Summary	(yellow card) 87' Gelabert; (yellow card) 88' Besle	Attendance: 26,440; Referee: (Switzerland) Stephan Klossner

10 April 2011 Round 27	Young Boys	3–3	Basel	Wankdorf, Bern
16:00	Bienvenu 26' (1:0); Lulić 33' (2:0); Nef (yellow card) 40'; Raimondi 80' (3:3); Wölfli (yellow card) 90+1'	Summary	(yellow card) 30' G. Xhaka; 38' (2:1) A. Frei; 65' (2:2) Streller; 77' (2:3) Tembo	Attendance: 31,120; Referee: (Switzerland) Massimo Busacca

17 April 2011 Round 28	Basel	2–2	Grasshopper	St. Jakob-Park, Basel
16:00	A. Frei 58' (1:2); Abraham 69' (2:2); Yapi (yellow card) 70'	Summary	9' (0:1) Pavlović; 13' (0:2) Callà	Attendance: 30,071; Referee: (Switzerland) Cyril Zimmermann

20 April 2011 Round 29	Neuchâtel	2–2	Basel	Stade de la Maladière, Neuchâtel
20:00	Gelabert (yellow card) 25'; Ismaeel (yellow card) 27'; Niasse 43' (1:1); Binya (yellow card) 53'; Nuzzolo 90+3' (2:2)	Summary	25' (0:1) Stocker; (yellow card) 45' Streller; 73' (1:2) A. Frei	Attendance: 5,450; Referee: (Switzerland) Ludovic Gremaud

23 April 2011 Round 30	Basel	2–1	Young Boys	St. Jakob-Park, Basel
17:45	Chipperfield 25' (1:1); Stocker (yellow card) 46'; G. Xhaka (yellow card) 85'; A. Frei 85' (2:1); Costanzo (yellow card) 90+2'	Summary	(yellow card) 19' Farnerud; 21' (0:1) Bienvenu; (yellow card) 40' Sutter; (yellow card) 70' (yellow-red card) 79' Lulić	Attendance: 31,595; Referee: (Switzerland) Nikolaj Hänni

1 May 2011 Round 31	Sion	3–0	Basel	Stade Tourbillon, Sion
16:00	Prijović 26' (1:0); Sio 28' (2:0); Sio (yellow card) 40'; Prijović 47' (3:0); Zambrella (yellow card) 84'	Summary	(yellow card) 20' Safari; (yellow card) Cabral	Attendance: 11,800; Referee: (Switzerland) Daniel Wermelinger

8 May 2011 Round 32	Basel	2–0	Bellinzona	St. Jakob-Park, Basel
16:00	Huggel 39' (1:0); A. Frei 89' (2:0)	Summary	(yellow card) 41' Feltscher; (yellow card) 72' Mattila; (yellow card) 89' Wahab; (yellow card) 90+4' Mihajlović	Attendance: 26,114; Referee: (Switzerland) Thomas Prammer

11 May 2011 Round 33	Zurich	2–2	Basel	Letzigrund, Zürich
19:45	Schönbächler (yellow card) 33'; Djurić 43' (1:0); Nikci 75' (2:1); Béda (yellow card) 12' (yellow-red card) 90+3'	Summary	(yellow card) 52' Shaqiri; 69' (1:1) A. Frei; 77' (2:2) A. Frei; (yellow card) 79' Huggel; (yellow card) 90+1' Abraham	Attendance: 22,800; Referee: (Switzerland) Stephan Studer

15 May 2011 Round 34	Basel	5–1	Thun	St. Jakob-Park, Basel
16:00	Dragović (yellow card) 25'; Huggel 34' (1:0); A. Frei 43' (2:1); G. Xhaka 45' (3:1); A. Frei 59' (4:1); Shaqiri 79' (5:1)	Summary	(yellow card) 32' Glarner; 38' (1:1) Andrist; (yellow card) 42' Matić; (yellow card) 61' Da Costa	Attendance: 29,063; Referee: (Switzerland) Massimo Busacca

22 May 2011 Round 35	St. Gallen	0–0	Basel	AFG Arena, St. Gallen
16:00	Regazzoni (yellow card) 11'; Abegglen (yellow card) 49'	Summary	(yellow card) 12' Shaqiri; (yellow card) 50' Huggel; (yellow card) 79' Dragović	Attendance: 19,500; Referee: (Switzerland) Alain Bieri

25 May 2011 Round 36	Basel	3–0	Luzern	St. Jakob-Park, Basel
20:00	A. Frei 6' (1:0); Shaqiri 45' (2:0); Zoua 54' (3:0)	Summary	(yellow card) 41' Kukeli; (yellow card) 51' Puljić; (yellow card) 53' Urtić	Attendance: 37,500 (sold out); Referee: (Switzerland) Massimo Busacca

==== League table ====
Pos	Team	Pld	W	D	L	GF	GA	GD	Pts	Qualification or relegation
1	Basel (C)	36	21	10	5	76	44	+32	73	Qualification to Champions League group stage (Note: Due to the winners of 2010–11 UEFA Champions League, Barcelona, having qualified for the 2011–12 UEFA Champions League group phase via their domestic leagues and the subsequent vacation of the title holder spot, Basel as Swiss champions were moved up from the third qualification round into the group stage.)
2	Zürich	36	21	9	6	74	44	+30	72	Qualification to Champions League third qualifying round
3	Young Boys	36	15	12	9	65	50	+15	57	Qualification to Europa League third qualifying round
4	Sion	36	15	9	12	47	36	+11	54	Qualification to Europa League play-off round (Note: By winning the 2010–11 Swiss Cup. The team was later disqualified from the Europa League after Celtic's successful protest over the team's use of ineligible players.)
5	Thun	36	11	16	9	48	43	+5	49	Qualification to Europa League second qualifying round
6	Luzern	36	13	9	14	62	57	+5	48	
7	Grasshopper	36	10	11	15	45	54	−9	41	
8	Neuchâtel Xamax	36	8	8	20	44	67	−23	32	
9	Bellinzona (R)	36	7	11	18	42	75	−33	32	Qualification to relegation play-offs
10	St. Gallen (R)	36	8	7	21	34	67	−33	31	Relegation to Swiss Challenge League

Source: Super League
Rules for classification: 1) points; 2) goal difference; 3) number of goals scored.
(C) Champions; (R) Relegated

=== Swiss Cup ===
19 September 2010 Round 1	FC Mendrisio-Stabio	0–5	Basel	Campo comunale Mendrisio, Mendrisio
15:30	Martinelli (yellow card) 69'	SFV summary FCB Summary	31' (0:1) Almerares; 36' (0:2) Schürpf; (yellow card) 44' Schürpf; 63' (0:3) Tembo; 70' (0:4) Schürpf; 88' (0:5) Almerares	Attendance: 3,200; Referee: (Switzerland) Bruno Grossen

15 October 2010 Round 2	Yverdon-Sport FC	0–2	Basel	Stade Municipal, Yverdon-les-Bains
19:30	Manière (yellow card) 57'; Gil (yellow card) 68'; Paquito (yellow card) 74'	SFV summary FCB summary	(yellow card) 45' Kusunga; (yellow card) 70' Huggel; 72' (0:1) Almerares; 77' (0:2) Tembo; (yellow card) 90' Chipperfield	Attendance: 1,800; Referee: (Switzerland) Cyril Zimmermann

20 November 2010 Round 3	Servette FC	1–1 (3–4 p)	Basel	Stade de Genève
19:00	de Azevedo 47' (pen.); Kouassi (yellow card) 53'; Pizzinat (yellow card) 64'	SFV summary FCB summary	18' (pen.) Chipperfield; (yellow card) 35' G. Xhaka; (yellow card) 38' Cabral; (yellow card) 68' Çağdaş	Attendance: 14,150; Referee: (Switzerland) Massimo Busacca
	Penalties
	Baumann (penalty missed); Routis (penalty scored) de Azevedo (penalty scored); Karanović (penalty scored); Nater (penalty missed)		Frei (penalty scored); Tembo (penalty scored); Huggel (penalty scored); Almerares (penalty missed); Inkoom (penalty scored)

3 March 2011 Quarterfinals	FC Biel-Bienne	3–1	FC Basel	Gurzelen Stadion
19:30	Egli 53' (1:1); Morello 80' (2:1); Etoundi 84' (3:1)	SFV summary FCB summary	Kehrli 43' (o.g.); (yellow card) 55' Ferati; (yellow card) 68' Yapi; (yellow card) 90+3' Dragović	Attendance: 6,500; Referee: (Switzerland) Daniel Wermelinger

=== UEFA Champions League ===
==== Third qualifying round ====
28 July 2010 QR3 leg 1	Debrecen (Hungary)	0–2	(Switzerland) Basel	Szusza Ferenc Stadium, Budapest^{1}
20:00		UEFA report FCB summary	Stocker 34' (yellow card) 84'; Cabral (yellow card) 50'; G. Xhaka 90+2'	Referee: César Muñiz Fernández (Spain)

4 August 2010 QR3 leg 2	Basel (Switzerland)	3–1	(Hungary) Debrecen	St. Jakob-Park, Basel
19:45	Inkoom (yellow card) 11'; Çağdaş 26'; Chipperfield 59'; Shaqiri 64'	UEFA report FCB summary	Coulibaly 74'	Referee: Vladislav Bezborodov (Russia)

- Note 1: Played in Budapest at Szusza Ferenc Stadium as Debrecen's Stadion Oláh Gábor Út did not meet UEFA criteria.

==== Play-off round ====
18 August 2010 POR leg 1	Basel (Switzerland)	1–0	(Moldova) Sheriff Tiraspol	St. Jakob-Park, Basel
20:45	Stocker 54'; Zoua (yellow card) 67'	UEFA report summary	(yellow card) 7' Branković; (yellow card) 53' Samardžić; (yellow card) 85' Vranješ; (yellow card) 76' (yellow-red card) 86' Yerokhin	Attendance: 13,460; Referee: Terje Hauge (NOR)

24 August 2010 POR leg 2	Sheriff Tiraspol (Moldova)	0–3	(Switzerland) Basel	Sheriff Stadium, Tiraspol
20:45		UEFA report FCB summary	Frei 80', 87' (yellow card) 17'; Atan (yellow card) 40'; Streller 73'	Attendance: 12,000; Referee: Martin Hansson

==== Group stage / Group E ====
15 September 2010 Matchday 1	CFR Cluj (Romania)	2–1	(Switzerland) Basel	Dr. Constantin Rădulescu, Cluj-Napoca
20:45	Rada 9' (yellow card) 90+2'; Traoré 12'; Panin (yellow card) 25'	UEFA report FCB report	45+2' Stocker; (yellow card) 55' Streller	Attendance: 9,593; Referee: Alan Kelly (Ireland)

28 September 2010 Matchday 2	Basel (Switzerland)	1–2	(Germany) Bayern Munich	St. Jakob-Park, Basel
20:45	Frei 18'	UEFA report FCB summary	56' (pen.), 89' Schweinsteiger	Attendance: 37,500; Referee: Craig Thomson (Scotland)

19 October 2010 Matchday 3	Roma (Italy)	1–3	(Switzerland) Basel	Stadio Olimpico, Roma
20:45	Borriello 21'	UEFA report FCB summary	12' Frei; 44' Inkoom; 90+3' Cabral	Attendance: 22,365; Referee: Aleksey Nikolaev (Russia)

3 November 2010 Matchday 4	Basel (Switzerland)	2–3	(Italy) Roma	St. Jakob-Park, Basel
20:45	Frei 69'; Shaqiri 83'	UEFA report FCB summary	16' Menez; 26' Totti; 76' Greco	Attendance: 36,375; Referee: Björn Kuipers (Netherlands)

23 November 2010 Matchday 5	Basel (Switzerland)	1–0	(Romania) CFR Cluj	St. Jakob-Park, Basel
20:45	Almerares 15'	UEFA summary FCB summary		Attendance: 34,239; Referee: Laurent Duhamel (France)

8 December 2010 Matchday 6	Bayern Munich (Germany)	3–0	(Switzerland) Basel	Allianz Arena, Munich
20:45	Ribéry 35', 49'; Tymoshchuk 37'	UEFA report FCB summary		Attendance: 64,000; Referee: Martin Hansson (Sweden)

Pos	Team	Pld	W	D	L	GF	GA	GD	Pts	Qualification
1	(Germany) Bayern Munich	6	5	0	1	16	6	+10	15	Advance to knockout phase
2	(Italy) Roma	6	3	1	2	10	11	−1	10	Advance to knockout phase
3	(Switzerland) Basel	6	2	0	4	8	11	−3	6	Transfer to Europa League
4	(Romania) CFR Cluj	6	1	1	4	6	12	−6	4	

Source: Soccerway

=== UEFA Europa League / knockout phase ===
17 February 2011 First leg	Basel (Switzerland)	2–3	(Russia) Spartak Moscow	St. Jakob-Park, Basel
21:05 CEST	Stocker (yellow card) 34'; Frei 36'; Streller 41'; Yapi (yellow card) 48'; Shaqiri (red card) 78'; Kusunga (yellow card) 90+1'	UEFA report FCB summary	(yellow card) 34' McGeady; (yellow card) 52' De Sousa Pereira; 61' D. Kombarov; 70' Dzyuba; (yellow card) 82' Dikan; (yellow card) 90' Suchý; 90+2' Ananidze	Attendance: 13,073; Referee: Aleksandar Stavrev (Macedonia)

24 February 2011 Second leg	Spartak Moscow (Russia)	1–1	(Switzerland) Basel	Luzhniki Stadium, Moscow
19:00 CEST	McGeady 90+1'	UEFA report FCB summary	15' Chipperfield; (yellow card) 31' Cabral; (yellow card) 72' Zoua; (yellow card) 86' Safari	Attendance: 14,977; Referee: Cristian Balaj (Romania)

Spartak Moscow won 4–3 on aggregate.

== Statistics ==
Includes all competitive matches.

Last updated on 28 August

=== Top scorers ===
Position	Number	Player	Super League	Champions League	Swiss Cup	Total
FW	13	(Switzerland) Alexander Frei	7	2	0	9
FW	9	(Switzerland) Marco Streller	1	1	0	2
MF	14	(Switzerland) Valentin Stocker	0	2	0	2
FW	31	(Cameroon) Jacques Zoua	1	0	0	1
DF	19	(Argentina) David Abraham	1	0	0	1
MF	7	(Switzerland) Pascal Schürpf	1	0	0	1
FW	15	(Argentina) Federico Almerares	1	0	0	1
FW	10	(Ivory Coast) Gilles Yapi	1	0	0	1
FW	30	(Zambia) Fwayo Tembo	1	0	0	1
DF	4	(Turkey) Çağdaş Atan	0	1	0	1
MF	11	(Australia) Scott Chipperfield	0	1	0	1
MF	17	(Switzerland) Xherdan Shaqiri	0	1	0	1
MF	34	(Switzerland) Granit Xhaka	0	1	0	1
/	/	Own Goals	0	0	0	0
		TOTALS	14	9	0	23

=== Top assistants ===
Position	Number	Player	Super League	Champions League	Swiss Cup	Total
MF	14	(Switzerland) Valentin Stocker	3	0	0	3
FW	13	(Switzerland) Alexander Frei	2	1	0	3
DF	22	(Ghana) Samuel Inkoom	2	0	0	2
DF	20	(Sweden) Behrang Safari	1	1	0	2
MF	8	(Switzerland) Benjamin Huggel	0	2	0	2
MF	17	(Switzerland) Xherdan Shaqiri	0	2	0	2
FW	30	(Zambia) Fwayo Tembo	1	0	0	1
FW	31	(Cameroon) Jacques Zoua	0	1	0	1
		TOTALS	9	7	0	16

=== Discipline ===
Position	Number	Player	Super League		Champions League		Swiss Cup		Total	
Position	Number	Player	Booked	Sent off (straight red)	Booked	Sent off (straight red)	Booked	Sent off (straight red)	Booked	Sent off (straight red)
MF	14	(Switzerland) Valentin Stocker	2	0	1	0	0	0	3	0
DF	4	(Turkey) Çağdaş Atan	2	0	1	0	0	0	3	0
DF	20	(Sweden) Behrang Safari	2	0	0	0	0	0	2	0
MF	24	(Switzerland) Cabral	1	0	1	0	0	0	2	0
DF	28	(Switzerland) Beg Ferati	2	0	0	0	0	0	2	0
GK	1	(Argentina) Franco Costanzo	1	1	0	0	0	0	1	1
FW	13	(Switzerland) Alexander Frei	1	0	1	0	0	0	2	0
DF	22	(Ghana) Samuel Inkoom	0	0	1	0	0	0	1	0
DF	21	(Switzerland) Genséric Kusunga	1	0	0	0	0	0	1	0
MF	17	(Switzerland) Xherdan Shaqiri	1	0	0	0	0	0	1	0
FW	30	(Zambia) Fwayo Tembo	1	0	0	0	0	0	1	0
MF	11	(Australia) Scott Chipperfield	1	0	0	0	0	0	1	0
DF	19	(Argentina) David Abraham	1	0	0	0	0	0	1	0
FW	15	(Argentina) Federico Almerares	1	0	0	0	0	0	1	0
FW	31	(Cameroon) Jacques Zoua	0	0	1	0	0	0	1	0
		TOTALS	17	1	6	0	0	0	23	1

== Sources ==
- Rotblau: Jahrbuch Saison 2015/2016. Publisher: FC Basel Marketing AG. ISBN 978-3-7245-2050-4
- Rotblau: Jahrbuch Saison 2017/2018. Publisher: FC Basel Marketing AG. ISBN 978-3-7245-2189-1
- Die ersten 125 Jahre / 2018. Publisher: Josef Zindel im Friedrich Reinhardt Verlag, Basel. ISBN 978-3-7245-2305-5
- Season 2010–11 at "Basler Fussballarchiv” homepage
- Switzerland 2010–11 at RSSSF
