= Genséric Kusunga =

Footballer (born 1988)

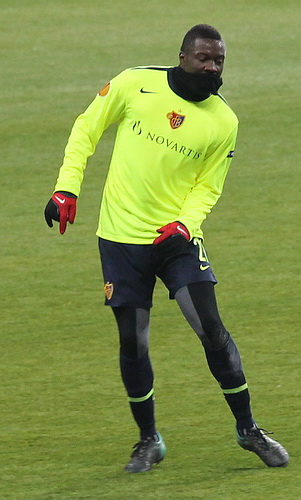

Personal information
- Full name: Genséric Kusunga
- Date of birth: 12 March 1988 (age 38)
- Place of birth: Geneva, Switzerland
- Height: 1.86 m (6 ft 1 in)
- Position: Centre-back

Youth career
- 1999–2005: Servette

Senior career*
Years	Team	Apps	(Gls)
2006–2010	Servette	68	(5)
2010–2013	FC Basel	13	(0)
2012–2013	→ Servette (loan)	19	(0)
2013–2015	Oldham Athletic	30	(2)
2016–2018	União da Madeira	20	(2)
2018–2019	Dundee	33	(2)
2019–2020	Cova da Piedade	8	(1)
Total		191	(12)

International career
2008	Switzerland U-20	1	(0)
2009–2010	Switzerland U-21	1	(0)
2013–2017	Angola	14	(0)
- * Club domestic league appearances and goals

Genséric Kusunga (born 12 March 1988) is a former professional footballer. He played for Servette, FC Basel, Oldham Athletic, União de Madeira, Dundee and Cova da Piedade. Born in Switzerland, he represented Angola at international level.

== Club career ==
=== Servette ===
Born in Geneva, Kusunga played his youth football with Servette. Having progressed through the club's youth teams, Kusunga joined their Under 21s team in the 2004–05 season. Following the club's bankruptcy in February 2005 all the professional players left the club and as a further consequence, the U-21 took over the club name playing two divisions lower, in 1. Liga. In the 2005–06 season, under head coach Jean-Michel Aeby , Kusunga made 17 appearances for the team in the 1. Liga, scoring once. The team won the division championship and thus secured promotion to the Challenge League, the second tier of Swiss football. Kusunga made a further 68 Challenge League appearances, scoring five times during his five-year tenure with the club.

=== Basel ===
In May 2010, ahead of the 2010–11 Swiss Super League season, Kusunga signed for Swiss Super League side FC Basel, and was handed the number 21 shirt on his arrival. He joined Basel's first team during their 2010–11 season under head coach Thorsten Fink. After playing in nine test games, he played his domestic league debut for the club in the home game in the St. Jakob-Park on 20 September, coming on as a 46th-minute substitute, as Basel won 3–2 against FC Zürich. Basel started in the 2010–11 UEFA Champions League third qualifying round and advanced to the group stage, but ended the group in third position. Therefore, they dropped to the 2010–11 Europa League knockout phase, but here they were eliminated by Spartak Moscow due to a last minute goal against them. Kusunga played in both Europa League games, but remained on the bench in the Champions League. With Basel, Kusunga won the Swiss Championship at the end of the 2010–11 season, topping the table just one point clear of rivals Zürich.

In the very first match of the new season, after just 3 minutes, Kusunga was substituted out due to a hamstring injury and this kept him out for two months. At the end of the 2011–12 season he won the Double with his new club. They won the League Championship title with 20 points advantage. The team won the Swiss Cup, winning the final 4–3 in a penalty shootout against Luzern.

To the start of the 2012–13 season it was decided to loan Kusunga out to his club of origin for a year, so that he could obtain playing experience. Servette had meantime been promoted to the Super League and he was able to play 19 league matches for them, but he could not help them from relegation as they finished in last position.

On his return to Basel he decided to leave the club. During his time with them Kusunga played a total of 50 games for Basel scoring a total of eight goals. 13 of these games were in the Swiss Super League, four in the Swiss Cup, four in the UEFA competitions (Champions League and Europa League) and 29 were friendly games. He scored all his eight goals during the test games.

=== Oldham Athletic ===
Kusunga signed for Oldham Athletic until the end of the 2013–14 season on 2 September 2013, with the option of extending the deal until the summer of 2015. Kusunga was recommended to the Latics by Oldham legend, Joe Royle, his son Darren's agency heard about the player whilst scouting in Switzerland. Kusunga was offered more lucrative deals to clubs in Israel and Bulgaria but the sharp tongued Joe Royle stepped in along with his son to secure a deal with Lee Johnsons side. Kusunga scored his first goal for the club in the first round of the FA Cup, giving the Latics the lead against Wolverhampton Wanderers.

Kusunga scored his first league goal on 25 January 2014 in a match that would become memorable for Oldham Athletic supporters. Trailing Peterborough United 3-0 at half-time, Oldham saw a portion of their supporters leave the stadium during the interval. After the break, the team recovered to 3-2 before conceding again to fall 4-2 behind. They quickly responded with another goal to make it 4-3, and in the closing minutes were awarded a penalty, which was converted to level the score at 4-4. Deep into injury time, Kusunga scrambled in a shot from a corner in the 96th minute, completing the comeback and securing a 5-4 victory for Oldham.

The one – year contract extension option that the club had on Kusunga was exercised, extending his contract till the end of the 2014–15 season. On 24 April 2015, Kusunga was released by Oldham.

=== C.F. União ===
After being without a club for ten months, Kusunga signed a deal with C.F. União in the Portuguese Primeira Liga.

=== Dundee ===
Kusunga, who as a free agent was able to sign outside of the transfer window, signed for Scottish Premiership club Dundee on 2 February 2018. He replaced Jack Hendry, who had been sold to Celtic on 31 January. He was released by Dundee at the end of the 2018–19 season.

=== Cova da Piedade ===
On 17 December 2019, Kusunga joined Portuguese LigaPro club C.D. Cova da Piedade on a free agent. After leaving the club in 2020, Kusunga would retire from football.

== International career ==
In 2008, Kusunga was called up five times for the Switzerland U-20 team, but played only once, against Germany U-21 on 22 April 2008. In 2009, Kusunga was called up twice for the Switzerland U-21 side in the UEFA European Under-21 Championship Qualifying stage, but was an unused substitute in both games. He played in one friendly match against Norway U-21 on 3 March 2010.

He has, however, since committed his international future to Angola, and played a friendly for them in the buildup to the 2013 African Cup of Nations.

== Honours ==
Basel

- Swiss Super League: 2011, 2012
- Swiss Cup: 2012

== Sources ==
- Rotblau: Jahrbuch Saison 2017/2018. Publisher: FC Basel Marketing AG. ISBN 978-3-7245-2189-1
- Die ersten 125 Jahre. Publisher: Josef Zindel im Friedrich Reinhardt Verlag, Basel. ISBN 978-3-7245-2305-5
- Verein "Basler Fussballarchiv" Homepage
