= Fwayo Tembo =

Zambian footballer (born 1989)

Personal information
- Full name: Fwayo Tembo
- Date of birth: 2 May 1989 (age 37)
- Place of birth: Lusaka, Zambia
- Height: 1.71 m (5 ft 7 in)
- Positions: Right winger; right midfielder

Youth career
- Edusport

Senior career*
Years	Team	Apps	(Gls)
2006–2007	National Assembly		
2008–2010	Étoile Sahel	19	(8)
2010–2012	FC Basel	30	(2)
2012	→ Étoile Sahel (loan)	5	(0)
2012–2015	Astra Giurgiu	45	(7)
2015–17	Power Dynamos		
2016	→ Hapoel Ra'anana (loan)	2	(0)
2018–2019	Lusaka Dynamos		
Total		101	(17)

International career^{‡}
2007	Zambia U20		
2008–2017	Zambia	24	(1)
- * Club domestic league appearances and goals as of 20 June 2026 ‡ National team caps and goals as of 21:52, 20 June 2026 (UTC)

Fwayo Tembo (born 2 May 1989) is a Zambian professional footballer who plays as a right winger or right midfielder.

== Football career ==
=== Early football ===
Tembo was born in Lusaka, Zambia. In 2008, at the age of 18, Tembo moved from Zambia to Sousse in Tunisia and signed with the traditional club Étoile Sportive du Sahel, who played in the Tunisian Ligue Professionnelle 1. He played his professional debut in April 2008 and during the 2008–09 Ligue 1 season he made eight appearances scoring two goals. Tembo won the Tunisian championship with his team. In the 2009–10 Ligue 1 season, Tembo made 11 appearances and scored six goals. The team ended the championship in third position.

=== Basel ===
On 29 May 2010, The Newspaper Post (Zambia) announced online that Tembo had joined FC Basel from Étoile Sportive du Sahel on a three-year deal, for a reported fee of €1.2 million. On the next day FC Basel confirmed the transfer, stating it was a four-year contract. He joined Basel's first team during their 2010–11 season under head coach Thorsten Fink.

After playing in eight test games, in which he netted four times, Tembo played his domestic league debut for the club in the home game in the St. Jakob-Park on 20 September as Basel won 3–2 against FC Zürich. He scored his first league goal for his new club on 14 August in the home game in the St. Jakob-Park as Basel were defeated 1–4 by FC Luzern. He scored his first goal in the Swiss Cup on 19 September in the away game as Basel won 5–0 against FC Mendrisio-Stabio. He scored another goal from the penalty spot on 10 April 2011 in the away 3–3 draw against BSC Young Boys in the Stade de Suisse.

Basel started in the 2010–11 UEFA Champions League third qualifying round and advanced to the group stage, but ended the group in third position. Therefore, they dropped to the 2010–11 Europa League knockout phase, but here they were eliminated by Spartak Moscow due to a last minute goal against them. Tembo played in eight of the 12 matches. Although mainly used as joker, Tembo won the Swiss Championship with Basel at the end of the 2010–11 season, topping the table just one point clear of rivals Zürich.

To the beginning of their 2011–12 season Tembo was member of the Basel team that won the 2011 Uhrencup, beating both Hertha Berlin 3–0 and West Ham United 2–1 to lead the table on goal difference above Young Boys. The start of the season ran respectably. Tembo played in eight test games and five games in the championship, one of which over the full 90 minutes, but suddenly things went quite. Tembo was no longer in the team's training sessions. Tembo left the club after he accused club coach Thorsten Fink of making racist remarks towards him during a training session. Fink is reported to have told a collaborator to get the monkey down from the tree.

There were no reactions from the club about this. But Tembo returned to Sousse in Tunisia and rejoined Étoile Sportive du Sahel on a loan deal. At the end of the season Basel terminated the contract with the player. During his time with the club, Tembo played a total of 67 games for Basel scoring a total of nine goals. 30 of these games were in the Swiss Super League, four in the Swiss Cup, eight in the UEFA competitions (Champions League and Europa League) and 25 were friendly games. He scored two goals in the domestic league, two in the cup and the other five were scored during the test games.

=== Astra Giurgiu ===
In the summer of 2012, he signed a contract with the Romanian side Astra Giurgiu.

=== Power Dynamos ===
He joined Power Dynamos on a two-year deal on Monday 4 April 2016 and made his debut on Saturday 9 April coming on off the bench at Arthur Davies Stadium in the second half for teammate Luka Lungu in a match Power went on to win 1–0.

He left Power Dynamos during the mid-season transfer window to join Lusaka Dynamos.

== International career ==
Tembo played for the national team in the 2007 African Youth Championship. He was the topscorer of the competition with 5 goals.

He played for the Zambia national under-20 football team during the 2007 FIFA U-20 World Cup in Canada, scoring a goal from the penalty spot in the game against Jordan national under-20 football team on 1 July 2007.

Fwayo Tembo played for the Zambia national football team at the 2008 Africa Cup of Nations in Ghana.

=== International goals ===
Scores and results list Zambia's goal tally first.

No	Date	Venue	Opponent	Score	Result	Competition
1.	5 September 2010	Konkola Stadium, Chililabombwe, Zambia	Comoros	2–0	4–0	Friendly

== Honours ==
Basel

- Swiss Super League: 2010–11

Astra Giurgiu

- Liga I: 2015–16

Zambia

- African Youth Championship Top Scorer: 2007
