= Granit Xhaka =

Swiss footballer (born 1992)

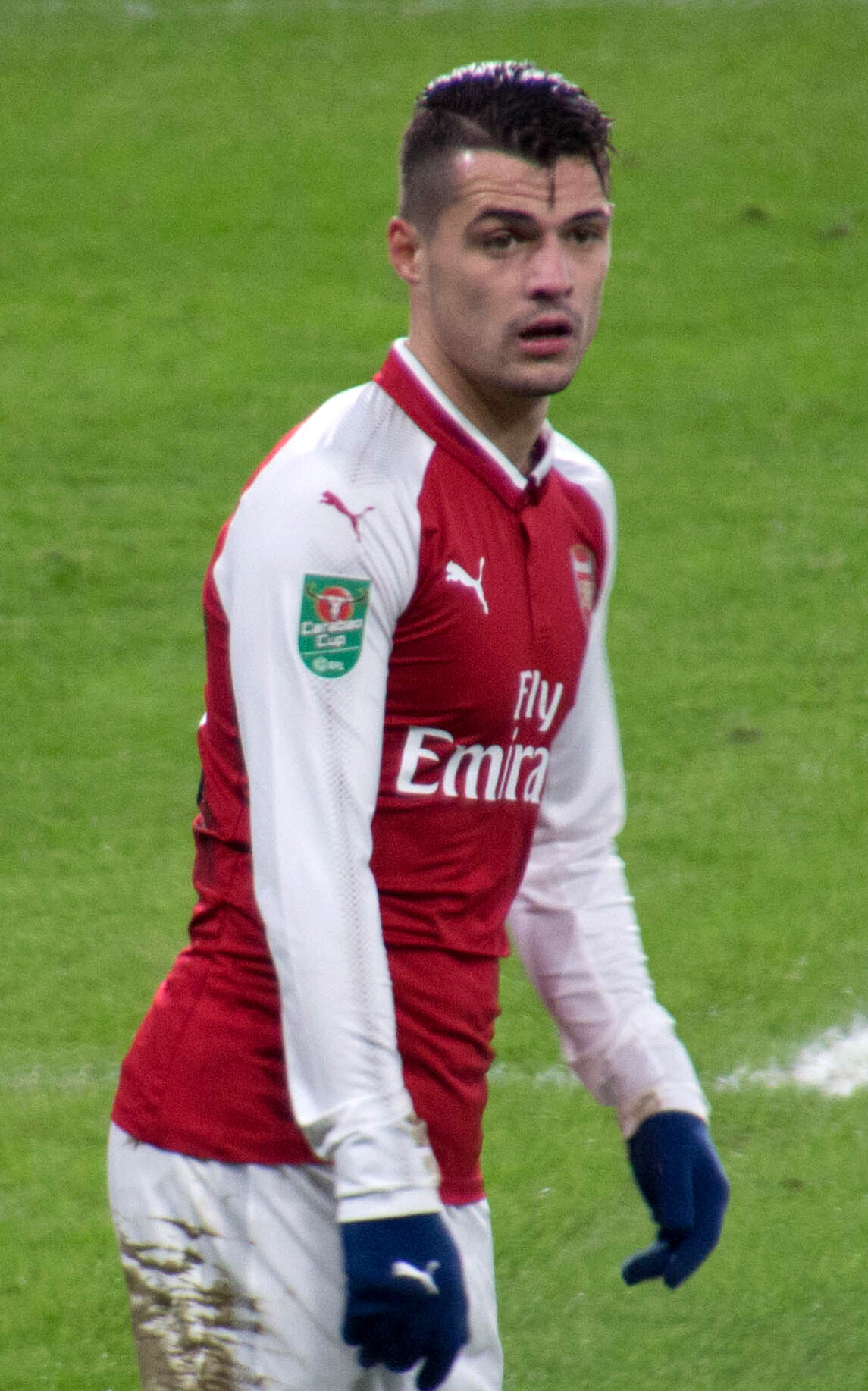
- Xhaka playing for Arsenal in 2018

Personal information
- Full name: Granit Xhaka
- Date of birth: 27 September 1992 (age 34)
- Place of birth: Basel, Switzerland
- Height: 1.86 m (6 ft 1 in)
- Position: Defensive midfielder

Team information
- Current team: Sunderland
- Number: 34

Youth career
- 2000–2002: Concordia Basel
- 2003–2010: Basel

Senior career*
Years	Team	Apps	(Gls)
2010–2012	Basel	42	(1)
2012–2016	Borussia Mönchengladbach	108	(6)
2016–2023	Arsenal	225	(17)
2023–2025	Bayer Leverkusen	66	(5)
2025–	Sunderland	43	(1)

International career^{‡}
2008–2009	Switzerland U17	13	(1)
2009–2010	Switzerland U18	3	(2)
2010–2011	Switzerland U19	12	(3)
2010–2011	Switzerland U21	5	(0)
2011–	Switzerland	152	(18)
Medal record
Men's football
Representing Switzerland
FIFA U-17 World Cup
Winner	2009 Nigeria	Team
UEFA European Under-21 Championship
Runner-up	2011 Denmark
- * Club domestic league appearances and goals as of 23:01, 31 October 2026 (UTC) ‡ National team caps and goals as of 11:45, 12 July 2026 (UTC)

Granit Xhaka (Albanian: [gɾanit d͡ʒaka], born 27 September 1992) is a Swiss professional footballer who plays as a defensive midfielder for and captains both Premier League club Sunderland and the Switzerland national team.

Xhaka began his career with Basel and won the Swiss Super League twice. He moved to Borussia Mönchengladbach in 2012, developing a reputation as a technically gifted player and natural leader alongside criticism for his temperament, and acted as club captain from 2015, twice leading the team to UEFA Champions League qualification.

Xhaka signed for Premier League club Arsenal in 2016 for a fee in the region of £30 million, making nearly 300 appearances over seven years, serving as captain, and winning two FA Cups. In 2023, he returned to the Bundesliga with Bayer Leverkusen, helping the club to their first-ever league title in his debut season. In 2025, he returned to England and joined newly-promoted Premier League side Sunderland.

Xhaka was part of the Swiss team that won the 2009 FIFA U-17 World Cup. He made his senior debut in 2011 and is currently the nation's record appearance holder, with 152 caps. He represented Switzerland at four FIFA World Cups (2014, 2018, 2022 and 2026) and three UEFA European Championships (2016, 2020 and 2024).

== Early life ==
The younger brother of Basel player Taulant Xhaka, Granit Xhaka was born on 27 September 1992 in the city of Basel, Switzerland, into an ethnic Albanian family from Besianë, Kosovo. The family moved from Besianë to Basel in 1990.

== Club career ==
=== Basel ===
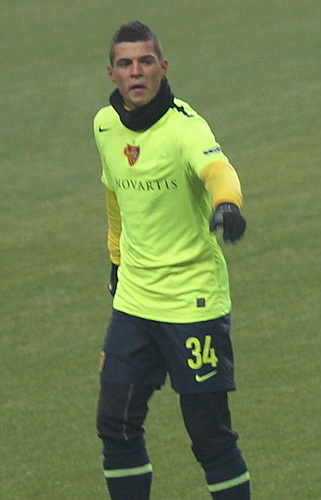
Xhaka warming up for Basel in 2011

Xhaka started his youth football with Concordia Basel and, together with his brother Taulant, moved to the youth department of Basel at the end of 2002. He played for various Basel youth teams regularly advancing through the ranks. In the 2006–07 season he was member of the U-15 team that won the Swiss championship, creating a record for eternity. They managed to win all championship games in that season to win the Swiss championship at that level. This was achieved with a goal difference of 104:13. Since competitive football began in Switzerland, no team had achieved this before. In the 2007–08 season he was member of the U-16 team that won the Swiss championship at that level, remaining undefeated throughout the entire season. During the 2008–09 season Xhaka advanced to the U-18 team, but was nevertheless called up to Basel's U-21 team, who played in the third tier of Swiss football, by their coach Patrick Rahmen and on 15 November 2008 Xhaka was substituted on in the 83rd minute as Basel won 2–1 against Cham. During the second half of the season Xhaka played nine further games for the U-21, scoring one goal and at the end of the season became division champions and won the championship at U-21 level. To the beginning of the 2009–10 season Xhaka advanced to become member of the U-21 squad, however was still eligible to play for the U-18 team, who at the end of the season became Swiss champions at their level.

To the beginning of their 2010–11 season, Xhaka advanced to Basel's first team under head coach Thorsten Fink. On 28 July 2010, Xhaka played his first team debut in the third qualifying round of the 2010–11 UEFA Champions League in the away match against Debrecen. He was substituted on in the 88th minute and four minutes later he scored the team's second goal to secure the victory. He played his domestic league debut for the club. playing the full 90 minutes, in the away game on 21 August as Basel played a 1–1 draw with Thun. He scored his first Super League goal for his new team on 15 May 2011, in the home game in the St. Jakob-Park as Basel won 5–1 against Thun. At the end of the 2010–11 league season, Xhaka won the championship title with the team. He had 20 league appearances, scoring once.

At the end of the 2011–12 season Xhaka won the Double with the team. They won the League Championship title with 20 points advantage over second placed Luzern. The final of the 2011–12 Swiss Cup was played in the Stade de Suisse on 16 May 2012. The game ended with a one-all draw after extra time and winning the penalty shoot-out Basel lifted the trophy. At the end of the season he left the club, during his time with Basel's first team Xhaka played a total of 67 competitive games for them scoring a three goals. 44 of these games were in the Swiss Super League, nine in the Swiss Cup, 14 in the UEFA competitions (Champions League and Europa League). He scored two goals in the domestic league and one in the Champions League.

=== Borussia Mönchengladbach ===
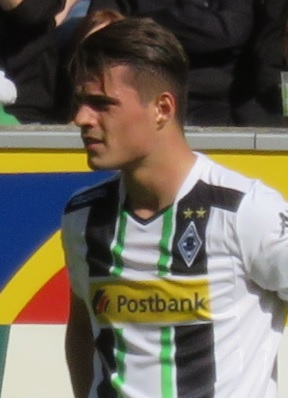
Xhaka playing for Borussia Mönchengladbach in 2015

On 18 May 2012, Basel announced on their homepage that Xhaka had agreed terms with Lucien Favre's Borussia Mönchengladbach. After medical checks were completed, Xhaka signed a five-year deal with the club. The transfer fee was not disclosed by Mönchengladbach, but is estimated to be in the region of €8.5 million.

Xhaka made his debut in a DFB-Pokal first round match against Alemannia Aachen on 18 August 2012. Three days later, he made his first appearance in European competition for Borussia in 1–3 home lost to Dynamo Kyiv in qualification for the 2012–13 UEFA Champions League. On 25 August, he made his Bundesliga debut in the team's opening match of the season, a 2–1 home win against TSG Hoffenheim. He scored his first and only goal of the season in a 3–2 loss at 1. FC Nürnberg.

In his second season at the club, Xhaka started 29 times and made five substitute appearances as Gladbach finished in sixth place in the 2014–15 Bundesliga. In 2014–15, Xhaka started all 34 2014–15 Bundesliga matches for Borussia and was named in the league's team of the season. Borussia finished in third place to qualify for the 2015–16 UEFA Champions League.

On 23 September 2015, Xhaka captained Borussia and scored his first goal of the season, heading in from Raffael's free kick in a 4–2 win over FC Augsburg. In the next match, against VfB Stuttgart, Xhaka again captained the side and scored a goal in a 3–1 win. On 30 September, he made his first appearance for Borussia in the Champions League proper in a 1–2 group stage loss at home to Manchester City. Xhaka received his fifth red card for the team in his 95th game on 20 December, for striking his opponent in the first half; he voluntarily gave €20,000 to charity as an apology.

=== Arsenal ===
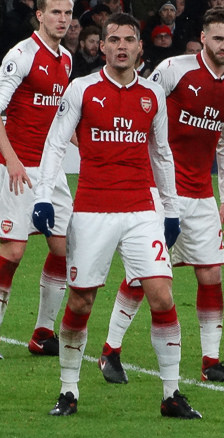
Xhaka playing for Arsenal in 2018

On 25 May 2016, Arsenal signed Xhaka from Borussia Mönchengladbach for a fee of around £35 million. Xhaka was signed after Arsenal allegedly backed out of a proposed transfer for N'Golo Kanté due to the agent fees involved, which totalled more than £10 million. Xhaka made his first appearance for Arsenal (as a half-time substitution) in a 2–1 win against the MLS All-Stars.

Xhaka made his competitive debut for Arsenal in the club's opening match of the 2016–17 Premier League season, a 4–3 defeat to Liverpool, replacing midfielder Mohamed Elneny in the 65th minute whilst also picking up a yellow card in the process. His first goal for the club came on 17 September 2016, a 25-yard thunderbolt in a 4–1 Premier League victory against Hull City. Four days later, he would score again from distance, this time from 30 yards in a 4–0 EFL Cup defeat of Nottingham Forest. Xhaka's first Arsenal red card – and eighth for club and country since April 2014 – came in a 3–2 win over Swansea City on 15 October 2016. On 22 January 2017, Xhaka was sent off for the second time in the season, by referee Jon Moss, in Arsenal's 2–1 home win against Burnley. After his first goal for the club in September, he would not score in the Premier League again until doing so in May, scoring the first goal of a 2–0 victory over Manchester United, ending United's run of 25 consecutive games unbeaten.

Xhaka went on to feature throughout Arsenal's triumphant FA Cup campaign. As so he started in the Cup final against Chelsea which the Gunners won 2–1. Xhaka also played in the 2017 Community Shield that Arsenal won on penalties over Chelsea. His first goal of the 2017–18 season came in a 3–3 draw with Liverpool, Xhaka scored a 25-yard thunderbolt to take Arsenal from 2–1 to 2–2.

On 15 September 2018, Xhaka scored the first goal, from a direct free kick, in a 2–1 victory against Newcastle United. On 28 October 2018, he scored again from a free kick against Crystal Palace. On 27 September 2019, Arsenal manager Unai Emery confirmed that Xhaka will be the new captain for the Gunners, replacing Laurent Koscielny.

In the match against Crystal Palace at the Emirates Stadium on 27 October 2019, Xhaka was at the center of criticism after being substituted off in the 61st minute. The incident began when a portion of Arsenal fans started to cheer when his name was called to be replaced. He was booed as he walked off the pitch, and responded by making several sarcastic gestures and angrily saying "fuck off" twice to the fans who jeered his name. He also removed his jersey before walking straight down the tunnel. Xhaka's actions were met with significant criticism after the match, and manager Unai Emery described Xhaka's conduct as "wrong". Emery also suggested that Xhaka should apologise. On 30 October 2019 the club announced that Xhaka would be offered counselling. Arsenal later tweeted an explanation from Xhaka about the incident. On 5 November 2019, just a month and a week after his announcement as captain, he was stripped of the captain's armband. Pierre-Emerick Aubameyang took over as the captain after previously serving as vice captain.

After this incident, Xhaka began a hiatus from the first team squad and it was deemed highly likely that he would leave Arsenal in the upcoming January transfer window. However, under the tenure of new manager Mikel Arteta, Xhaka was reintroduced into the team as a key player and saw a sharp uptake in his form for the club and slowly began to win over the fans with whom he had previously had an oft fractious relationship. Xhaka credited Arteta for this resurgence, claiming 'He [Arteta] turned me around and gave me a second chance and he showed me he trusted me and I tried to give him everything back.' On 1 August 2020, Xhaka was selected to start in the FA Cup Final against Chelsea, and went on to win his second winners' medal as Arsenal won their 14th FA Cup.

On 28 August 2020, Xhaka was in the starting 11 in the 2020 FA Community Shield, which Arsenal clinched a 5–4 victory over Liverpool in the penalty shootout after the match was 1–1 after 90 minutes. On 13 December, Arsenal hosted Burnley in a Premier League fixture. Xhaka was sent off at the 56th minute, after clashing with Dwight McNeil and later grabbing Ashley Westwood by the neck. The match eventually ended with Burnley winning 1–0 after teammate Pierre-Emerick Aubameyang scored an own goal at the 73rd minute. On 26 December, he scored his first Premier League goal of the 2020–21 season from a free kick in a 3–1 home win against Chelsea.

On 13 January 2022, Xhaka received a red card in an EFL Cup semi-final first-leg tie against Liverpool. It was his fifth overall red card in his Arsenal career. The match eventually ended goalless. Xhaka scored his first goal of the 2021–22 season with a long-range strike from 25 yards out, that helped seal a 3–1 victory over Manchester United at the Emirates Stadium. His stunning strike was eventually named winner of the club's annual Goal of the Season. Xhaka scored his first goal of the 2022–23 season, with a third goal from close range against Leicester City in a 4–2 victory during their first home game of the season.

=== Bayer Leverkusen ===
On 6 July 2023, Xhaka signed for Bundesliga club Bayer Leverkusen on a five-year contract for a fee of €25 million (£21.4 million), returning to Germany for the first time in seven years. On 12 August, he made his debut in a 2023–24 DFB-Pokal match, playing the full 90 minutes in an 8–0 win against Teutonia Ottensen. On 23 February 2024, he scored his first goal for Leverkusen in a 2–1 victory against Mainz 05.

On 14 April, Xhaka scored in Leverkusen's 5–0 win over Werder Bremen to clinch the club's first German championship. On 25 May, he scored the only goal against Kaiserslautern in the DFB-Pokal final, which granted his club their second ever DFB-Pokal trophy, and secured their invincible double season.

Xhaka scored the opening goal of the 2024–25 Bundesliga season from long-distance against former club Borussia Mönchengladbach on 23 August 2024 as Leverkusen won 3–2; Xhaka did not celebrate out of respect for Gladbach.

=== Sunderland ===
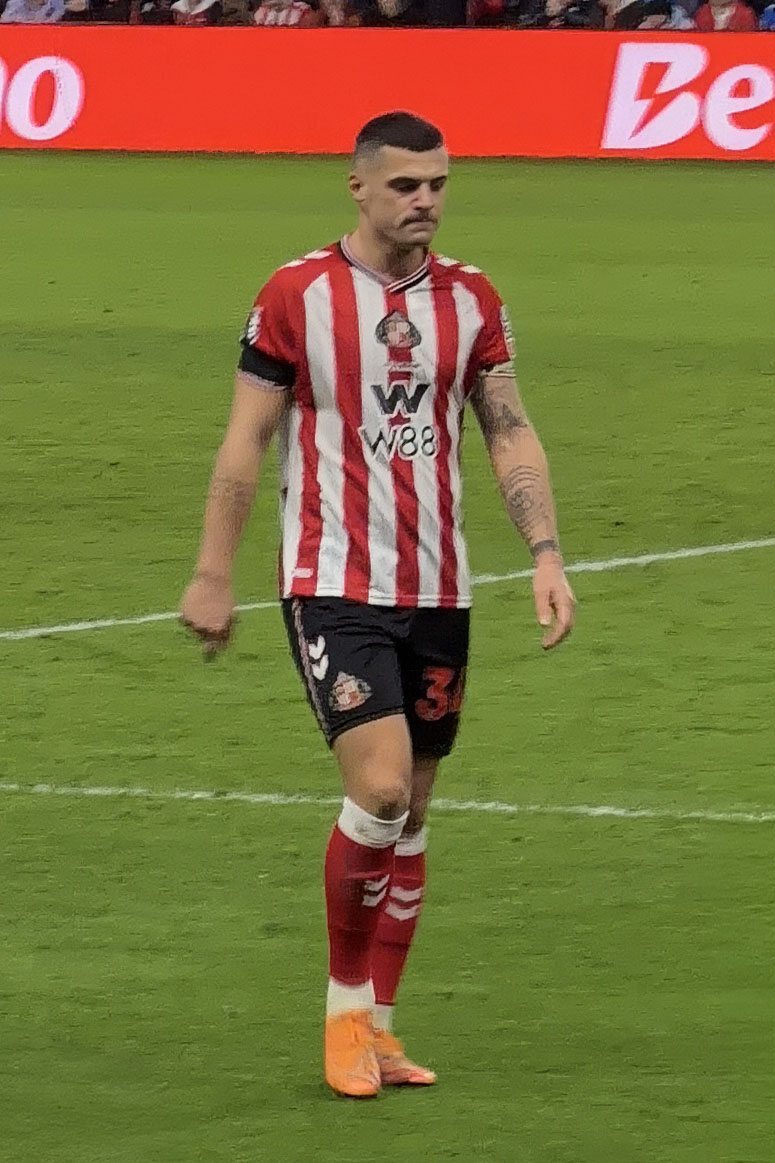
Xhaka playing for Sunderland in 2025

On 30 July 2025, Xhaka returned to England, signing for newly promoted Premier League side Sunderland on a three-year contract for a reported initial fee of £13 million, with an additional £4 million in add-ons. Afterwards, he was named as Sunderland captain by head coach Régis Le Bris ahead of the 2025–26 season. Later that year, on 3 November, he scored his first goal for Sunderland in a 1–1 draw with Everton. He eventually captained the newly promoted side to a place in the Europa League after they finished seventh in the league.

== International career ==
=== 2008–2011: Youth levels and senior debut ===
Xhaka has played for Swiss youth squad at the U-17 level. He participated in the Under-17 World Cup in 2009 in Nigeria. The Swiss team won the World Cup.

He played his first game for the Switzerland national under-19 team on 25 May 2010, as a substitute, as the team beat Austria national under-19 football team 3–2 in the Schwaz, Austria. He scored his first goal for the U-19 on 7 September 2010 as the team won 3–0 against the Czech Republic.

Xhaka played his first game for the under-21 side on 3 September 2010, as a substitute, as the team beat the Republic of Ireland 1–0 at the Cornaredo Stadium in Lugano. This was the last game in the qualification Group 2 to the 2011 UEFA European Under-21 Championship. Xhaka was member of the Swiss U-21 squad that competed in the final tournament, hosted by Denmark, between 11 and 25 June 2011. The Swiss team reached the final without conceding a goal, but lost to Spain 2–0.

=== 2011–present: Senior tournaments and captaincy ===
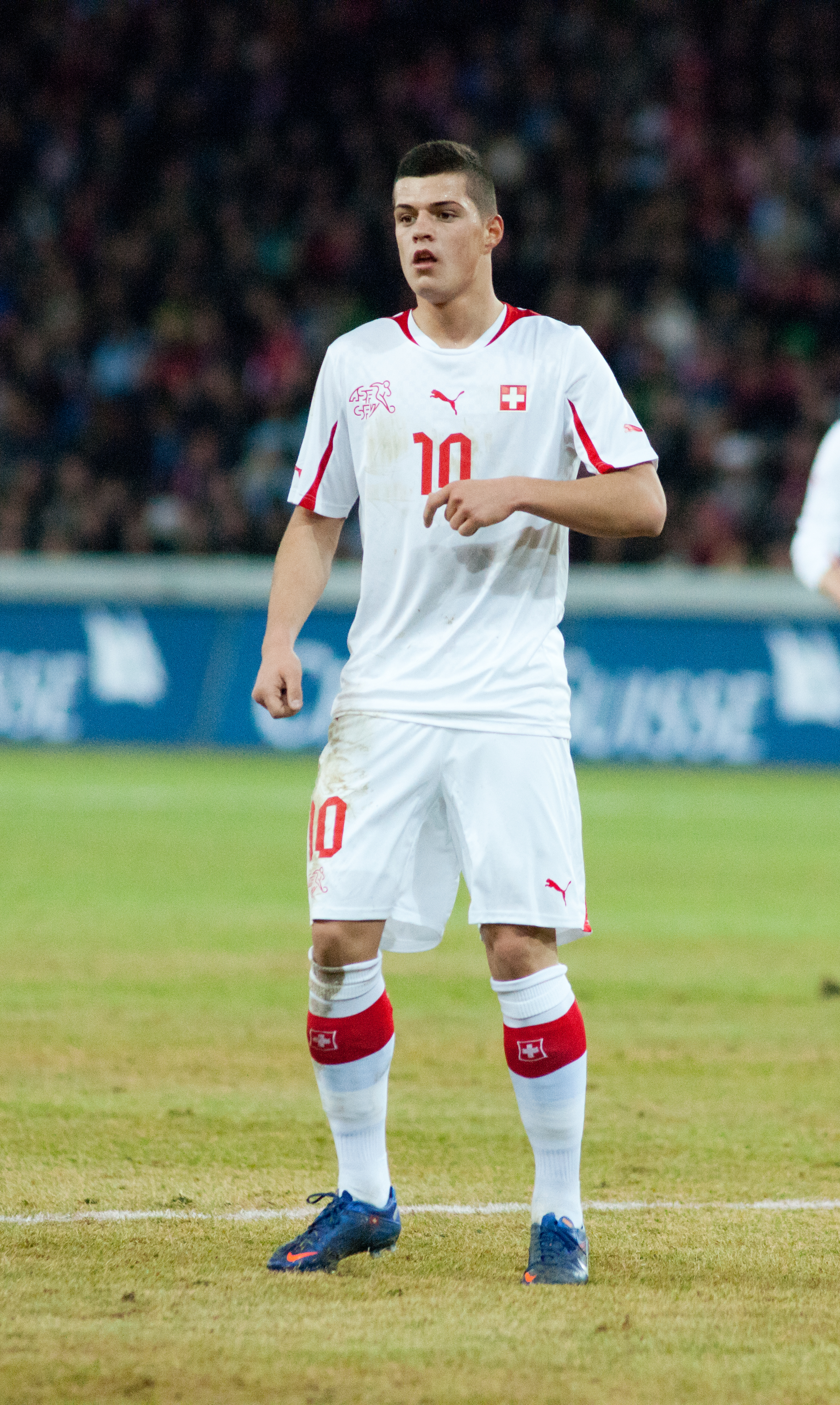
Xhaka playing for Switzerland in 2012

Before making his international debut for Switzerland, Xhaka was still undecided whether to play for his birth country or Albania, and he complained to the Albanian sports media that the Albanian Football Federation was ignoring him whilst the Swiss Football Association was showing much more interest.

Xhaka debuted for Switzerland at Wembley Stadium against England in a 2–2 UEFA Euro 2012 qualifying draw on 4 June 2011. On 15 November 2011, during his sixth international appearance, he scored his first international goal in the 1–0 away win against Luxembourg at the Stade Josy Barthel.

Switzerland also tried to select Xhaka to participate in the 2012 Olympic Football tournament, but he opted to stay at his new club for pre-season training. He participated in all ten of Switzerland's 2014 FIFA World Cup qualification campaign matches, scoring both goals in a 2–0 defeat of Slovenia. On 2 June 2014, Xhaka was named in Switzerland's 2014 World Cup squad by national coach Ottmar Hitzfeld. In the team's second match, Xhaka scored in a 5–2 loss to France.

Xhaka was selected for UEFA Euro 2016, where Switzerland's campaign opened against Albania in Lens. Xhaka, whose team won 1–0, was playing against his brother Taulant. He was voted the man of the match. Xhaka played every minute of Switzerland's campaign, which ended in the round of 16 with a loss to Poland at the Stade Geoffroy-Guichard; after a 1–1 draw he was the only player to not score in the penalty shoot-out, shooting wide.

Ahead of the 2018 World Cup qualifiers, there was speculation that Xhaka could switch his allegiance to represent Kosovo, which had been accepted as a full member of FIFA and were allowed to play competitive matches for the first time. Xhaka, however, published an open letter stating that his participation in Euro 2016 had disqualified him from changing his allegiance, and he was thus tied to Switzerland.

Xhaka was named in manager Vladimir Petković's 23-man Swiss squad for the 2018 FIFA World Cup in Russia. On 22 June, he equalised with a long-range strike as the Swiss came from behind to defeat Serbia 2–1 in their second game. He and fellow goalscorer Xherdan Shaqiri, who is also of Albanian descent, celebrated their goals by making an eagle gesture resembling the double headed eagle of the Albanian flag. FIFA fined each player 10,000 Swiss francs "for unsporting behaviour contrary to the principles of fair-play".

Xhaka was appointed as a temporary captain by Vladimir Petković in the absence of Stephan Lichtsteiner, which caused him to be criticised by former Swiss international Stéphane Henchoz, who claimed that Xhaka could not properly represent Switzerland due to his Albanian heritage, instead suggesting that Lichtsteiner, Yann Sommer, or Fabian Schär serve as captain. In September 2019, Xhaka offered his captaincy to Xherdan Shaqiri in an effort to get him to return to the national side.

In June 2021, Xhaka was selected for the Switzerland squad for UEFA Euro 2020. He captained the team in their three group matches, as well as the round of 16 tie with France. In the match against France, he assisted Mario Gavranović's 90th-minute equalising goal as Switzerland progressed to the quarter-final via a penalty shootout. However, a yellow card received 14 minutes earlier meant that Xhaka was suspended for the quarter-final, where the Swiss lost to Spain in a penalty shootout.

In November 2022, Xhaka was selected for the 26-man Switzerland squad for the 2022 FIFA World Cup in Qatar. He played every minute of Switzerland's four matches of the tournament as they reached the round of 16, where they were beaten 6–1 by Portugal.

On 15 October 2023, in a 3–3 draw with Belarus during UEFA Euro 2024 qualifying, Xhaka equalled Heinz Hermann's record of 118 appearances for the Swiss national team. A month later, he captained the Nati in a 1–1 draw in Israel to break the record with his 119th appearance.

In June 2024, Xhaka was named in Switzerland's squad for UEFA Euro 2024. He captained the team to 3–1 over Hungary in their opening Group A match and was named Man of the match.

On 20 May 2026, Xhaka was selected in the 26-man squad for the 2026 FIFA World Cup. He made his 13th World Cup appearance for Switzerland in the opening 1–1 draw against Qatar, becoming his country's joint-record appearance holder in the competition, alongside his teammate Ricardo Rodriguez. On 18 June, he scored a stoppage-time penalty in the second match, which ended in a 4–1 victory over Bosnia and Herzegovina.

== Style of play ==
A technically gifted player with good shooting abilities, Xhaka started out playing as an attacking midfielder before being moved to the role of deep-lying playmaker in front of the defence, either in the centre of a 4–3–3, or as one of the double pivots in a 4–2–3–1 or 3–4–3. In this role, he helps dictate the tempo of his team's gameplay through his clever range of passing. He his also known for his aggression, defensive contribution, and leadership qualities, having served as Arsenal's captain. However, he has also occasionally drawn criticism in the media over his inconsistency and aggressive temperament, which has led him to receive cards, as well as due to the perceived inferior quality of his club performances in comparison to his international performances.

== Personal life ==
Xhaka's elder brother, Taulant Xhaka was also a professional footballer who played for Basel and previously represented the Albania national team. In July 2017, Xhaka married his long-term partner, Leonita Lekaj. They have three daughters, born in 2019, 2021 and 2025.

Xhaka speaks fluent Albanian, German (including Swiss German), French, and English. He is a Muslim.

=== Controversies ===
==== COVID-19 vaccination certificate investigation ====
In September 2026, Xhaka became the subject of an investigation by the public prosecutor's office in Lucerne, Switzerland, concerning a COVID-19 vaccination certificate allegedly obtained fraudulently in 2022, when he was playing for Arsenal. The investigation is intended to determine whether his actions constituted a criminal offence involving the fraudulent acquisition of a false certification and/or forgery of documents.

On 21 September 2026, Xhaka acknowledged that he had obtained a vaccination certificate without having been vaccinated at the time, citing doubts and a deep distrust of the COVID-19 vaccine. He described his actions as a mistake, apologised, accepted responsibility and said that he would fully cooperate with the authorities.

Following his admission, Xhaka was withdrawn from Switzerland's squad for the September 2026 international window, missing the team's forthcoming UEFA Nations League matches. The Swiss Football Association said that the situation would be reassessed after the international break. If charges are brought and Xhaka is convicted, he could face a fine or, theoretically, a prison sentence of up to five years under Swiss law, although reports have indicated that a custodial sentence would be unlikely.

== Career statistics ==
=== Club ===
As of match played 5 November 2026

Appearances and goals by club, season and competition
Club	Season	League			National cup (Note: Includes Swiss Cup, DFB-Pokal, FA Cup)		League cup (Note: Includes EFL Cup)		Europe		Other		Total	
Club	Season	Division	Apps	Goals	Apps	Goals	Apps	Goals	Apps	Goals	Apps	Goals	Apps	Goals
Basel	2010–11	Swiss Super League	20	1	3	0	—		6 (Note: Four appearances and one goal in UEFA Champions League, two appearances in UEFA Europa League)	1	—		29	2
Basel	2011–12	Swiss Super League	24	1	6	0	—		8 (Note: Appearances in UEFA Champions League)	0	—		38	1
Basel	Total		44	2	9	0	—		14	1	—		67	3
Borussia Mönchengladbach	2012–13	Bundesliga	22	1	2	0	—		9 (Note: Two appearances in UEFA Champions League, seven appearances in UEFA Europa League)	0	—		33	1
Borussia Mönchengladbach	2013–14	Bundesliga	28	0	1	0	—		—		—		29	0
Borussia Mönchengladbach	2014–15	Bundesliga	30	2	3	0	—		9 (Note: Appearances in UEFA Europa League)	3	—		42	5
Borussia Mönchengladbach	2015–16	Bundesliga	28	3	3	0	—		5	0	—		36	3
Borussia Mönchengladbach	Total		108	6	9	0	—		23	3	—		140	9
Arsenal	2016–17	Premier League	32	2	5	0	2	1	7	1	—		46	4
Arsenal	2017–18	Premier League	38	1	0	0	3	1	6	1	1 (Note: Appearance in FA Community Shield)	0	48	3
Arsenal	2018–19	Premier League	29	4	1	0	1	0	9	0	—		40	4
Arsenal	2019–20	Premier League	31	1	6	0	0	0	4	0	—		41	1
Arsenal	2020–21	Premier League	31	1	2	0	1	0	10	0	1	0	45	1
Arsenal	2021–22	Premier League	27	1	0	0	3	0	—		—		30	1
Arsenal	2022–23	Premier League	37	7	2	0	1	0	7	2	—		47	9
Arsenal	Total		225	17	16	0	11	2	43	4	2	0	297	23
Bayer Leverkusen	2023–24	Bundesliga	33	3	6	1	—		11	0	—		50	4
Bayer Leverkusen	2024–25	Bundesliga	33	2	5	0	—		10	0	1 (Note: Appearance in DFL-Supercup)	0	49	2
Bayer Leverkusen	Total		66	5	11	1	—		21	0	1	0	99	6
Sunderland	2025–26	Premier League	34	1	2	0	0	0	—		—		36	1
Sunderland	2026–27	Premier League	9	0	0	0	0	0	4	0	—		13	0
Sunderland	Total		43	1	2	0	0	0	4	0	—		49	1
Career total			486	31	47	1	11	2	105	8	3	0	652	42

=== International ===
As of match played 11 July 2026

Appearances and goals by national team and year
National team	Year	Apps	Goals
Switzerland	2011	6	1
Switzerland	2012	9	2
Switzerland	2013	8	1
Switzerland	2014	10	1
Switzerland	2015	6	1
Switzerland	2016	11	0
Switzerland	2017	9	2
Switzerland	2018	13	2
Switzerland	2019	10	2
Switzerland	2020	7	0
Switzerland	2021	9	0
Switzerland	2022	13	0
Switzerland	2023	10	2
Switzerland	2024	14	0
Switzerland	2025	8	2
Switzerland	2026	9	2
Total		152	18

As of match played 18 June 2026
Switzerland score listed first, score column indicates score after each Xhaka goal.

List of international goals scored by Granit Xhaka
No.	Date	Venue	Cap	Opponent	Score	Result	Competition	Ref.
1	15 November 2011	Stade Josy Barthel, Luxembourg City, Luxembourg	6	Luxembourg	1–0	1–0	Friendly	
2	15 August 2012	Stadion Poljud, Split, Croatia	10	Croatia	1–0	4–2	Friendly	
3	7 September 2012	Stožice Stadium, Ljubljana, Slovenia	11	Slovenia	1–0	2–0	2014 FIFA World Cup qualification	
4	15 October 2013	Stade de Suisse, Bern, Switzerland	22	Slovenia	1–0	1–0	2014 FIFA World Cup qualification	
5	20 June 2014	Itaipava Arena Fonte Nova, Salvador, Brazil	28	France	2–5	2–5	2014 FIFA World Cup	
6	27 March 2015	Swissporarena, Lucerne, Switzerland	34	Estonia	2–0	3–0	UEFA Euro 2016 qualifying	
7	9 June 2017	Tórsvøllur, Tórshavn, Faroe Islands	53	Faroe Islands	1–0	2–0	2018 FIFA World Cup qualification	
8	7 October 2017	St. Jakob-Park, Basel, Switzerland	56	Hungary	1–0	5–2	2018 FIFA World Cup qualification	
9	27 March 2018	Swissporarena, Lucerne, Switzerland	61	Panama	2–0	6–0	Friendly	
10	22 June 2018	Kaliningrad Stadium, Kaliningrad, Russia	64	Serbia	1–1	2–1	2018 FIFA World Cup	
11	26 March 2019	St. Jakob-Park, Basel, Switzerland	74	Denmark	2–0	3–3	UEFA Euro 2020 qualifying	
12	18 November 2019	Victoria Stadium, Gibraltar	82	Gibraltar	6–1	6–1	UEFA Euro 2020 qualifying	
13	25 March 2023	Karađorđe Stadium, Novi Sad, Serbia	112	Belarus	4–0	5–0	UEFA Euro 2024 qualifying	
14	12 September 2023	Stade de Tourbillon, Sion, Switzerland	117	Andorra	2–0	3–0	UEFA Euro 2024 qualifying	
15	10 October 2025	Strawberry Arena, Solna, Sweden	140	Sweden	1–0	2–0	2026 FIFA World Cup qualification	
16	15 November 2025	Stade de Genève, Geneva, Switzerland	142	Sweden	2–1	4–1	2026 FIFA World Cup qualification	
17	31 May 2026	Kybunpark, St. Gallen, Switzerland	145	Jordan	3–0	4–1	Friendly	
18	18 June 2026	SoFi Stadium, Inglewood, United States	148	Bosnia and Herzegovina	4–1	4–1	2026 FIFA World Cup	

== Honours ==
Basel Youth

- U15 Swiss Championship: 2006–07
- U16 Swiss Championship: 2007–08
- U21 Swiss Championship: 2008–09

Basel

- Swiss Super League: 2010–11, 2011–12
- Swiss Cup: 2011–12

Arsenal

- FA Cup: 2016–17, 2019–20
- FA Community Shield: 2017, 2020
- EFL Cup runner-up: 2017–18
- UEFA Europa League runner-up: 2018–19

Bayer Leverkusen

- Bundesliga: 2023–24
- DFB-Pokal: 2023–24
- DFL-Supercup: 2024
- UEFA Europa League runner-up: 2023–24

Switzerland U17

- FIFA U-17 World Cup: 2009

Individual

- Swiss Footballer of the Year: 2017, 2022, 2023
- Swiss Youth Footballer of the Year: 2012
- Bundesliga Team of the Season: 2023–24
- VDV Bundesliga Team of the Season: 2023–24, 2024–25
- UEFA Europa League Team of the Season: 2023–24
- Sunderland Player of the Season: 2025–26

== See also ==
- List of men's footballers with 100 or more international caps

== Sources ==
- Josef Zindel (2018). FC Basel 1893. Die ersten 125 Jahre (in German). Basel: Friedrich Reinhardt Verlag. ISBN 978-3-7245-2305-5.
- Rotblau: Jahrbuch Saison 2014/2015. Publisher: FC Basel Marketing AG. ISBN 978-3-7245-2027-6
