= Matthias Baron =

German footballer (born 1988)

Personal information
- Date of birth: 17 August 1988 (age 38)
- Positions: Striker; midfielder

Youth career
- FV Brombach
- –2005: SV Weil
- 2005–2007: SC Freiburg

Senior career*
Years	Team	Apps	(Gls)
2007–2010	SV Weil	?	(?)
2010–2011	FC Basel U21	22	(9)
2010–2011	FC Basel	4	(0)
2011–2014	FC Vaduz	35	(7)
Total		61	(16)
- * Club domestic league appearances and goals

Matthias Baron (born 17 August 1988) is a German former professional footballer who played mainly in the position as striker, but also as midfielder.

== Career ==
=== Youth ===
Baron started his youth football with local club FV Brombach and then joined SV Weil. After completing the U-18 stage, the midfielder switched to SC Freiburg in the summer of 2005 and made 21 appearances in the Under 19 Bundesliga during the 2006–07 season. He suffered a collarbone fracture and his recovery was slow. He returned to SV Weil in 2007 and subsequently played in the Verbandsliga Südbaden. There he developed into one of the most prolific midfielders in the league.

=== Basel ===
FC Basel's scouting watched Baron and he was invited by the Swiss club on sign in on trial in 2010. Since the transfer took place outside the transfer window, Baron was only eligible to play for the Basler U-21 team in the Promotion League, third tier of Swiss football, until the summer break. He proved himself here scoring 6 goals in 9 appearances.

In the summer of 2010 he advanced to the professional squad and received a one-year contract. Baron joined Basel's first team for their 2010–11 season under head coach Thorsten Fink. After playing in 13 test games, in which he scored eight goals, Baron played his debut for the first team in the Swiss Cup game on 19 September 2010 as Basel won 5–0 against FC Mendrisio-Stabio. He played his domestic league debut for the club in the away game on 6 February 2011 as Basel won 3–2 against Thun. At the end of the 2010–11 Swiss Super League season Baron won the Swiss Championship title with FC Basel. Baron made only four appearances and he managed only 24 minutes play in the entire championship.

The club let Baron leave on a free transfer. During his time with the first team, Baron played a total of 34 games for Basel scoring 14 goals. Four of these games were in the Swiss Super League, three in the Swiss Cup and 27 were friendly games. He scored all 14 goals during the test games. He had also had 22 appearances in the U-21 team scoring nine goals.

=== Vaduz ===
After winning the championship title in Basel, Baron signed a one-year contract for the 2011/2012 season with Liechtenstein's record cup winners Vaduz, who at the time played in the Challenge League the second tier of Swiss football.

Baron made his debut for Vaduz on 24 July 2011 in the match against St. Gallen He scored his first goal on 1 August in a home game against Winterthur. His contract was then extended until the end of 2014. At the end of the 2013–14 Challenge League season Vaduz won the championship and were promoted to the Super League. Thrown back by injuries, he only made it to a few appearances that season and had to undergo an operation. The contract, which expired in December 2014, was not renewed, after which Baron ended his active playing career. The Striker from Lörrach had scored seven goals in 47 competitive matches during his time with Vaduz.

== Honours ==
Basel

- Swiss Super League: 2010–11

Vaduz

- Swiss Challenge League: 2013–14
- Liechtenstein Football Cup: 2012–13, 2013–14

== Sources ==
- Verein "Basler Fussballarchiv" Homepage
