= Gilles Yapi Yapo =

Ivorian footballer (born 1982)

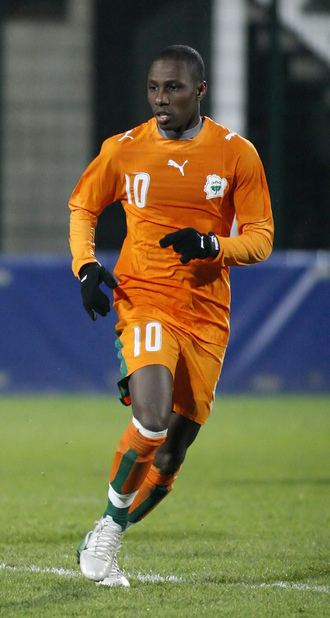
- Yapi Yapo with the Ivory Coast in 2007

Personal information
- Full name: Gilles Donald Yapi Yapo
- Date of birth: 30 January 1982 (age 44)
- Place of birth: Abidjan, Ivory Coast
- Height: 1.71 m (5 ft 7 in)
- Position: Defensive midfielder

Senior career*
Years	Team	Apps	(Gls)
–2001	ASEC Mimosas		
2001–2004	Beveren	67	(13)
2004	→ Nantes (loan)	15	(1)
2004–2006	Nantes	45	(2)
2006	→ Young Boys (loan)	16	(2)
2006–2010	Young Boys	115	(15)
2010–2013	Basel	58	(3)
2013–2014	Dubai	12	(1)
2014–2018	Zürich	49	(2)
2017–2018	→ Aarau (loan)	19	(0)
2018–2019	Basel II	11	(0)

International career
2000–2010	Ivory Coast	46	(3)

Managerial career
- 2024–: FC Solothurn
- * Club domestic league appearances and goals as of 17 October 2021

Gilles Donald Yapi Yapo (born 30 January 1982) is an Ivorian former professional footballer who played as a midfielder. He is currently the coach of FC Solothurn.

== Club career ==
Born in Abidjan, Yapi Yapo started his career at ASEC Mimosas and then moved to Europe with Beveren. He joined Nantes on a loan contract in January 2004, and on 17 May, he signed a three-year contract, because his contract with Beveren was due to expire in the summer. At this stage of his career, he played as an attacking midfielder. He was on the fringe at Nantes in the 2005–06 season, prompting a loan move to Young Boys. He then joined Young Boys on a permanent basis, where he played as a defensive midfielder and playmaker.

On 15 February 2010 FC Basel announced that they had signed Yapi Yapo as from 1 July on a three-year contract. He joined Basel's first team during their 2010–11 season under head coach Thorsten Fink. After playing in eight test games Yapi Yapo played his domestic league debut for his new club in the home game in the St. Jakob-Park on 20 July 2010 as Basel won 3–2 against Zürich. He scored his first goal for his new club in the home game on 1 August 2010 as Basel won 3–0 against FC St. Gallen.

Basel started in the 2010–11 UEFA Champions League third qualifying round and advanced to the group stage, but ended the group in third position. Therefore, they dropped to the 2010–11 Europa League knockout phase, but here they were eliminated by Spartak Moscow due to a last minute goal against them. Yapi Yapo played in 11 of the 12 European matches. With Basel, Yapi Yapo won the Swiss Championship at the end of the 2010–11 season topping the table just one point clear of rivals Zürich.

To the beginning of their 2011–12 season Yapi Yapo was a member of the Basel team that won the 2011 Uhrencup, beating both Hertha Berlin 3–0 and West Ham United 2–1 to lead the table on goal difference above Young Boys. During just the second league game of the 2011–12 Super League season, Yapi Yapo suffered a rupture of the cruciate ligament, and this kept him out of the game for six months. He returned to the team for the away draw in the Stade de Suisse against Young Boys on 16 February 2012 as he was substituted in during the 65th minute. At the end of the 2011–12 season he won the Double with his new club. They won the League Championship title with 20 points advantage. The team won the Swiss Cup, winning the final 4–3 in a penalty shootout against Luzern.

Basel had started in the 2012–13 UEFA Champions League in the qualifying rounds. But were knocked out of the competition by CFR Cluj in the play-off round. They then continued in the 2012–13 UEFA Europa League group stage. Ending the group in second position, Basel continued in the knockout phase and advanced as far as the semi-finals, there being matched against the reigning UEFA Champions League holders Chelsea. Chelsea won both games advancing 5–2 on aggregate, eventually winning the competition. In the early stages of the season Yapi Yapo came to regular playing time, but following an injury in August, his appearance time diminished. At the end of the Swiss Super League season 2012–13 he won the Championship title with the team. In the 2012–13 Swiss Cup Basel reached the final, but were runners up behind Grasshopper Club, being defeated 4–3 on penalties, following a 1–1 draw after extra time.

Yapi Yapo appeared in just four games in the second half of the season. But because head coach Murat Yakin no longer considered Yapi Yapo within his plans, the contract between club and player was not prolonged and he departed as free agent. During his time with the club, Yapi Yapo played a total of 119 games for Basel scoring a total of nine goals. 58 of these games were in the Swiss Super League, seven in the Swiss Cup, 15 in the UEFA competitions (Champions League and Europa League) and 39 were friendly games. He scored three goals in the domestic league and the other nine were scored during the test games.

In August 2013 Yapi Yapo signed for Dubai CSC.

On 22 June 2014, it was announced that Yapi Yapo had signed with Zürich on a one-year contract.

On 9 November 2014, FC Aarau player and former Basel teammate Sandro Wieser committed a knee-high challenge on Yapi Yapo in a league match, leaving the latter's career in serious doubt. He suffered torn anterior and cruciate ligaments, a torn meniscus, a torn kneecap tendon, serious cartilage damage and deep bruising to his thigh. Wieser was shown a straight red card for the tackle, and was later suspended for six matches by the Swiss league. With Yapi Yapo highly unlikely to ever play again, Zürich president Ancillo Canepa launched legal proceedings against Wieser.

Yapi Yapo did eventually return to action as a first-half substitute, in a 3–3 draw against FC Thun at the Letzigrund on 13 September 2015, scoring the third Zürich goal in the process.

On 26 August 2017, FC Aarau announced that they had signed Yapi Yapo on a loan period for one season.

On 20 July 2018, it was announced that Yapi Yapo would return to FC Basel. Preparing for a course as trainer, he was to help with the Basel U-21 team in the Promotion League, the third tier of Swiss football. In the announcement it was also suggested that he could help with the coaching team.

== International career ==
Yapi Yapo was part of the Ivory Coast team at the 2006 FIFA World Cup in Germany. He was also selected in the preliminary Ivory Coast squad for the 2010 FIFA World Cup, but was eventually dropped along with Bakari Koné and Emerse Faé, who played with him in the 2006 World Cup. He retired from the Ivory Coast national team after this.

== Honours ==
ASEC Mimosas

- Côte d'Ivoire Premier Division: 1999–2000, 2000–01

Basel

- Swiss Super League: 2010–11, 2011–12, 2012–13
- Swiss Cup: 2011–12
- Uhrencup: 2011

Zürich

- Swiss Cup: 2015–16

Ivory Coast

- Africa Cup of Nations runner-up: 2006
