= Michel Avanzini =

Swiss footballer (born 1989)

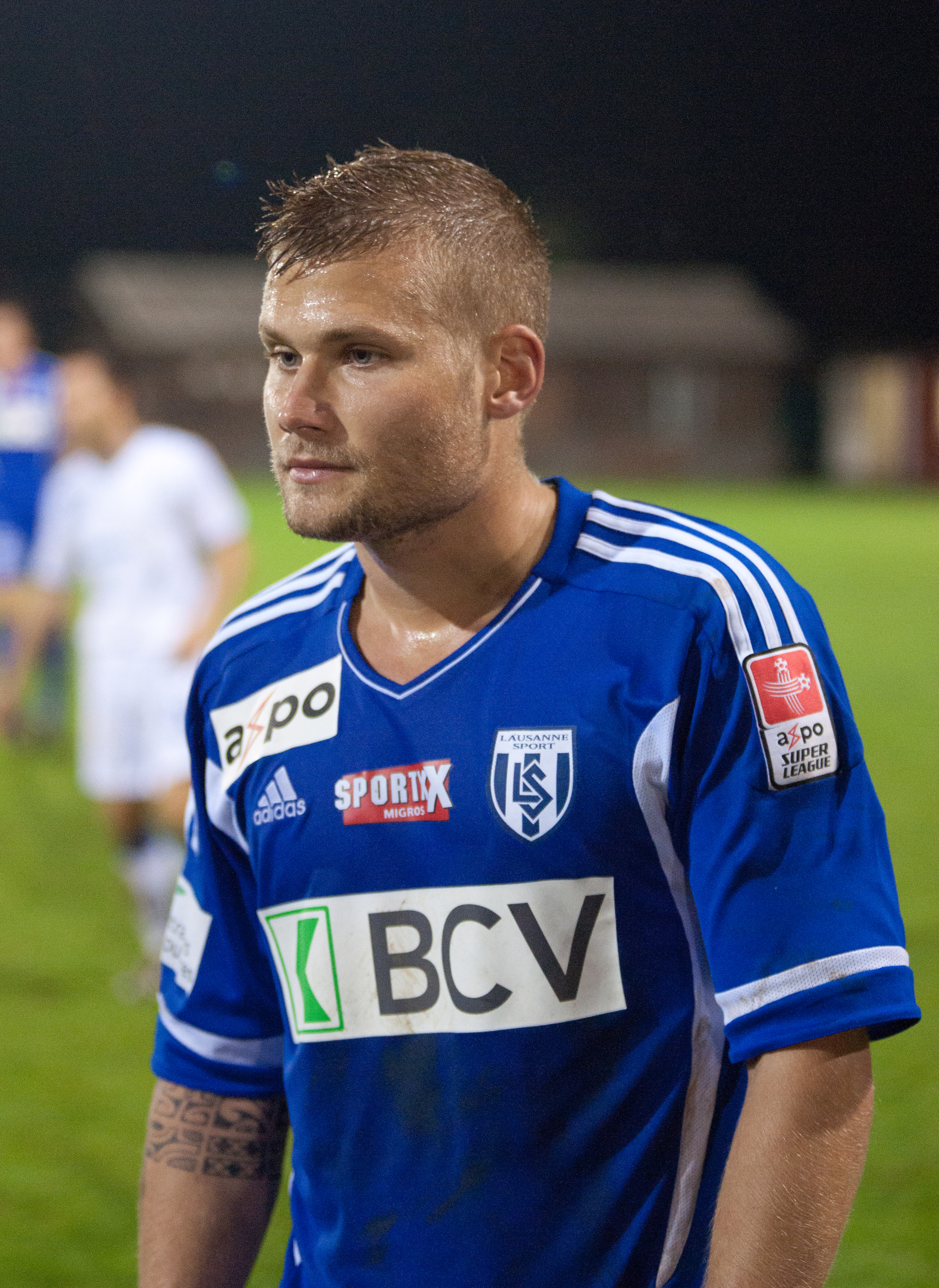

Personal information
- Date of birth: 28 March 1989 (age 37)
- Place of birth: Winterthur, Switzerland
- Height: 1.75 m (5 ft 9 in)
- Position: Midfielder

Youth career
- Winterthur

Senior career*
Years	Team	Apps	(Gls)
2006–2007	Winterthur II	26	(3)
2006–2007	Winterthur	2	(0)
2007–2009	St. Gallen II	28	(1)
2008–2010	St. Gallen	0	(0)
2009	→ Gossau (loan)	13	(1)
2009–2010	→ Gossau (loan)	25	(8)
2010–2014	Lausanne-Sport	58	(4)
2014	FC Rapperswil-Jona	0	(0)
2014–2015	Servette FC	31	(3)
2015–2017	Winterthur	35	(1)
2015–2018	Winterthur II	11	(5)
2018	YF Juventus	11	(1)
2018–2019	Freienbach	9	(0)

International career
2009–2010	Switzerland U20	5	(2)
- * Club domestic league appearances and goals

Michel Avanzini (born 28 March 1989) is a Swiss former professional footballer.
