= Simon Roduner =

Swiss footballer (born 1984)

Personal information
- Date of birth: 20 October 1984 (age 42)
- Place of birth: Zürich, Switzerland
- Height: 1.82 m (5 ft 11 1/2 in)
- Positions: Defensive midfielder; centre back

Team information
- Current team: Höngg

Youth career
- –2005: Grasshopper

Senior career*
Years	Team	Apps	(Gls)
2006–2011	Wohlen	125	(11)
2011–2012	St. Gallen	7	(0)
2012–2014	Höngg	36	(7)
- * Club domestic league appearances and goals as of May 17, 2014

Simon Roduner (born 20 October 1984) is a former Swiss professional footballer. From 2014 until 2018 he coached the team of SV Höngg. Under him the team got promoted into the 1st league in Sommer 2017. In July 2018 he became the head coach of FC Red Star Zurich.
