= 2010–11 Swiss Super League =

114th season of top-tier Swiss football

Swiss Super League
- Season: 2010–11
- Dates: 17 July 2010 – 25 May 2011
- Champions: Basel; 14th title
- Relegated: Bellinzona; St. Gallen
- Champions League: Basel; Zürich
- Europa League: Sion; Young Boys; Thun
- Matches: 180
- Goals: 537 (2.98 per match)
- Top goalscorer: Alexander Frei (27 goals)
- Biggest home win: Zürich 5–0 Bellinzona
- Biggest away win: Luzern 0–5 Zürich
- Highest scoring: Luzern 6–2 Bellinzona

The 2010–11 Swiss Super League was the 114th season of top-tier football in Switzerland. It began on 17 July 2010 and ended on 25 May 2011. The league comprised ten teams.

FC Basel successfully defended their league title, maintaining a one-point edge over runners-up FC Zürich at the end of the season. It was the 14th league title overall for the club.

== Teams ==
FC Aarau were relegated after finishing in last place of the table after the 2009–10 season. They were replaced by 2009–10 Challenge League champions FC Thun.

Ninth-placed AC Bellinzona and Challenge League runners-up FC Lugano competed in a two-legged relegation play-off after the end of the 2009–10 season. Bellinzona won 2–1 on aggregate and thus retained their Super League spot.

=== Stadia and locations ===
Location of teams in the 2010–11 Swiss Super League

| Club | Location | Stadium | Capacity |
|---|---|---|---|
| FC Basel | Basel | St. Jakob-Park | 38,512 |
| AC Bellinzona | Bellinzona | Stadio Comunale Bellinzona | 8,740 |
| Grasshopper Club Zürich | Zürich | Letzigrund | 23,605 |
| FC Luzern | Emmenbrücke | Stadion Gersag | 8,700 |
| Neuchâtel Xamax | Neuchâtel | Stade de la Maladière | 12,000 |
| FC Sion | Sion | Stade Tourbillon | 16,500 |
| FC St. Gallen | St. Gallen | AFG Arena | 19,694 |
| FC Thun | Thun | Stadion Lachen | 10,350 |
| BSC Young Boys | Bern | Wankdorf | 31,783 |
| FC Zürich | Zürich | Letzigrund | 23,605 |

== League table ==
| Pos | Team | Pld | W | D | L | GF | GA | GD | Pts | Qualification or relegation |
|---|---|---|---|---|---|---|---|---|---|---|
| 1 | Basel (C) | 36 | 21 | 10 | 5 | 76 | 44 | +32 | 73 | Qualification to Champions League group stage (Note: Due to the winners of 2010–11 UEFA Champions League, Barcelona, having qualified for the 2011-12 UEFA Champions League group phase via their domestic leagues and the subsequent vacation of the title holder spot, Basel as Swiss champions were moved up from the third qualification round into the group stage.) |
| 2 | Zürich | 36 | 21 | 9 | 6 | 74 | 44 | +30 | 72 | Qualification to Champions League third qualifying round |
| 3 | Young Boys | 36 | 15 | 12 | 9 | 65 | 50 | +15 | 57 | Qualification to Europa League third qualifying round |
| 4 | Sion | 36 | 15 | 9 | 12 | 47 | 36 | +11 | 54 | Qualification to Europa League play-off round (Note: By winning the 2010–11 Swiss Cup were won the qualification to Europa League play-off round. However, after the two play-off games had been played the following season, the team was disqualified from the Europa League following Celtic's successful protest over the team's use of ineligible players.) |
| 5 | Thun | 36 | 11 | 16 | 9 | 48 | 43 | +5 | 49 | Qualification to Europa League second qualifying round |
| 6 | Luzern | 36 | 13 | 9 | 14 | 62 | 57 | +5 | 48 | |
| 7 | Grasshopper | 36 | 10 | 11 | 15 | 45 | 54 | −9 | 41 | |
| 8 | Neuchâtel Xamax | 36 | 8 | 8 | 20 | 44 | 67 | −23 | 32 | |
| 9 | Bellinzona (R) | 36 | 7 | 11 | 18 | 42 | 75 | −33 | 32 | Qualification to relegation play-offs |
| 10 | St. Gallen (R) | 36 | 8 | 7 | 21 | 34 | 67 | −33 | 31 | Relegation to Swiss Challenge League |

Source: Super League
Rules for classification: 1) points; 2) goal difference; 3) number of goals scored.
(C) Champions; (R) Relegated

== Results ==
Teams played each other four times over the course of the season, twice at home and twice away, for a total of 36 matches per team.

=== First half of season ===
| Home \ Away | BAS | BEL | GCZ | LUZ | NX | SIO | STG | THU | YB | ZÜR |
|---|---|---|---|---|---|---|---|---|---|---|
| Basel | | 3–1 | 2–2 | 1–4 | 4–1 | 1–1 | 3–0 | 1–3 | 3–1 | 3–2 |
| Bellinzona | 1–0 | | 1–1 | 0–3 | 3–3 | 0–2 | 1–3 | 2–2 | 2–1 | 1–2 |
| Grasshopper | 2–1 | 2–3 | | 0–3 | 1–1 | 0–4 | 2–0 | 0–0 | 1–2 | 1–2 |
| Luzern | 1–1 | 6–2 | 3–2 | | 4–2 | 2–3 | 4–0 | 1–1 | 2–0 | 1–1 |
| Neuchâtel Xamax | 1–2 | 1–2 | 1–1 | 2–1 | | 0–3 | 0–1 | 2–3 | 2–4 | 3–4 |
| Sion | 1–2 | 1–1 | 2–0 | 4–1 | 1–2 | | 0–2 | 1–1 | 2–0 | 1–1 |
| St. Gallen | 1–3 | 3–2 | 1–2 | 1–2 | 0–2 | 1–1 | | 2–1 | 1–2 | 0–3 |
| Thun | 1–1 | 0–0 | 2–2 | 1–1 | 1–2 | 1–0 | 3–0 | | 1–1 | 1–3 |
| Young Boys | 2–2 | 1–1 | 1–0 | 1–1 | 0–1 | 2–1 | 1–1 | 2–2 | | 1–0 |
| Zürich | 1–4 | 2–2 | 2–0 | 2–2 | 3–1 | 1–1 | 3–1 | 0–0 | 2–2 | |

Source: Swiss Football League
Legend: Blue = home team win; Yellow = draw; Red = away team win.

=== Second half of season ===
| Home \ Away | BAS | BEL | GCZ | LUZ | NX | SIO | STG | THU | YB | ZÜR |
|---|---|---|---|---|---|---|---|---|---|---|
| Basel | | 2–0 | 2–2 | 3–0 | 1–0 | 1–0 | 3–0 | 5–1 | 2–1 | 3–1 |
| Bellinzona | 0–4 | | 2–0 | 2–0 | 1–1 | 2–2 | 1–3 | 1–1 | 1–5 | 0–1 |
| Grasshopper | 1–2 | 2–2 | | 2–1 | 3–1 | 2–0 | 1–3 | 0–0 | 3–2 | 3–1 |
| Luzern | 0–1 | 3–2 | 1–0 | | 2–1 | 0–1 | 1–1 | 0–1 | 1–1 | 0–5 |
| Neuchâtel Xamax | 2–2 | 1–2 | 0–0 | 2–1 | | 1–0 | 2–1 | 1–4 | 1–2 | 1–2 |
| Sion | 3–0 | 1–0 | 2–0 | 3–2 | 0–0 | | 2–0 | 1–0 | 0–2 | 0–2 |
| St. Gallen | 0–0 | 1–0 | 1–4 | 0–4 | 1–1 | 0–1 | | 0–1 | 0–2 | 2–2 |
| Thun | 2–3 | 3–1 | 0–1 | 3–3 | 1–0 | 3–1 | 0–0 | | 1–1 | 2–3 |
| Young Boys | 3–3 | 4–0 | 2–2 | 3–1 | 3–2 | 1–1 | 4–2 | 0–1 | | 4–2 |
| Zürich | 2–2 | 5–0 | 1–0 | 2–0 | 3–0 | 2–0 | 3–1 | 1–0 | 2–1 | |

Source: Swiss Football League
Legend: Blue = home team win; Yellow = draw; Red = away team win.

== Relegation play-offs ==
Bellinzona as 9th-placed Super League team played a two-legged play-off against 2010–11 Challenge League runners-up Servette.

28 May 2011
16:45 CEST

| Bellinzona | 1–0 | Servette |
|---|---|---|
| Pergl 88' | Report (in German) |

Stadio Comunale Bellinzona
Attendance: 4,800
Referee: Alain Bieri

31 May 2011
19:15 CEST

| Servette | 3–1 | Bellinzona |
|---|---|---|
| de Azevedo 11'; Baumann 45' 56' | Report (in German) | Lustrinelli 69' |

Stade de Genève
Attendance: 23,338
Referee: Hänni Nikolaj

Servette won 3–2 on aggregate.

== Top goalscorers ==
Source: Swiss Football League

| Rank | Player | Club | Goals |
|---|---|---|---|
| 1 | (Switzerland) Alexander Frei | Basel | 27 |
| 2 | (Cameroon) Henri Bienvenu | Young Boys | 16 |
| 3 | (Switzerland) Mauro Lustrinelli | Bellinzona | 14 |
| 4 | (Switzerland) Hakan Yakin | Luzern | 12 |
| 5 | (France) Alexandre Alphonse | Zürich | 10 |
| 5 | (Ivory Coast) Giovanni Sio | Sion | 10 |
| 5 | (Switzerland) Admir Mehmedi | Zürich | 10 |
| 5 | (Switzerland) Marco Streller | Basel | 10 |
| 5 | (Switzerland) Innocent Emeghara | Grasshopper | 10 |
| 10 | (Portugal) Nelson Ferreira | Luzern | 9 |
| 10 | (Argentina) Ezequiel Scarione | Thun | 9 |
| 10 | (Zambia) Emmanuel Mayuka | Young Boys | 9 |
| 10 | (Tunisia) Amine Chermiti | Zürich | 9 |

== Attendances ==
| # | Club | Average |
|---|---|---|
| 1 | Basel | 29,044 |
| 2 | Young Boys | 21,500 |
| 3 | St. Gallen | 12,762 |
| 4 | Zürich | 11,750 |
| 5 | Sion | 10,550 |
| 6 | Luzern | 7,993 |
| 7 | GCZ | 6,789 |
| 8 | Xamax | 5,136 |
| 9 | Thun | 4,792 |
| 10 | Bellinzona | 3,338 |
