= 2009–10 FC Basel season =

FC Basel
2009–10 season
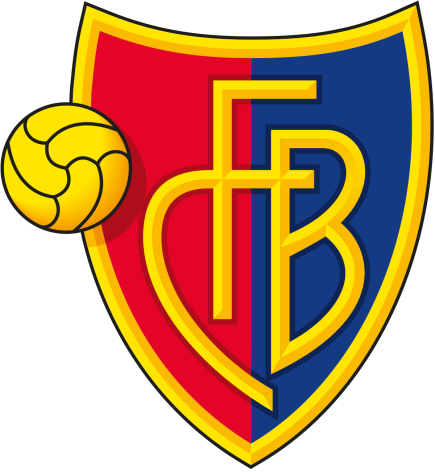
- Chairman: Gisela Oeri
- Manager: Thorsten Fink
- Swiss Super League: 1st (champions)
- Swiss Cup: Winners
- UEFA Europa League: Group stage
- Top goalscorer: League: Marco Streller (21); All: Marco Streller (30)
- Highest home attendance: 27,087 vs Young Boys (30 August 2009)
- Lowest home attendance: 20,239 vs FC St. Gallen (23 September 2009)
- Average home league attendance: 23,666

FC Basel began their 2009–10 season with various warm-up matches against Swiss lower league, Ukrainian Vyscha Liha, and Super League Greece clubs. The club's aim for their first team during the 2009–10 season were to win back the league championship and to win the cup title. It was also their aim qualify for the UEFA Europa League group stage.

== Overview ==
The pre-season started with several major changes, the biggest being the sacking of coach Christian Gross, who was replaced by the German Thorsten Fink. Fink was appointed as Basel's new manager on 9 June 2009. The new manager let several players go by not extending their contracts. These were Ronny Hodel, Jürgen Gjasula, Ivan Ergić and Eduardo. Star striker Eren Derdiyok was sold to Bayer 04 Leverkusen and Eduardo Rubio returned to Cruz Azul because his loan was not made permanent. A number of players were brought into the first team from the under-21 squad to replace them, including Xherdan Shaqiri, Marco Aratore and Oliver Klaus. A number of new players were signed, the highest profile being Alexander Frei from Borussia Dortmund. Others new signings included Turkish Çağdaş Atan from Energie Cottbus, Ghanaian Samuel Inkoom from Asante Kotoko, Massimo Colomba from rivals Grasshopper, Brazilian Antônio da Silva on loan from Karlsruher SC and Cabral who returned after being on loan to Sevilla.

== The Campaign ==
=== Domestic League ===
In domestic affairs, Basel swept the board, despite a poor start to the season. After the eighth round Basel were only in ninth position in the league table, second last. They had lost three and won only two of the first eight league matches. This was also due to the number of injuries that the players suffered in the pre-season and in the early stages. After the weak start the results changed to the better, the team won seven of the eight subsequent matches. Under these were a 4–0 home win against St. Gallen and a 5–0 against Sion. The most spectacular, however, was the 5–4 away win against Luzern, where FCB took the lead three times, only for Luzern to equalise each time, only minutes later. In the 87th minute Luzern went in front for the first time and looked as though they would win, but entering into added time Alexander Frei equalised for FCB and in the fourth minute of added time Marco Streller scored the definitive winner. However, following the team's second defeat against table leaders Young Boys, Basel went into the winter break thirteen points behind the league leaders.

In the second half of the season the team played their best football. Basel with nine straight victories, 16 wins in their last 18 games, they made a comeback in the table. Despite suffering an embarrassing 0–4 away defeat against the Grasshoppers in the fifth last round, Basel drew level with Young Boys on 77 points before the last match of the season. Strangely enough, in the last round the two teams played against each other. This match was in Bern at the Stade de Suisse on 16 May 2010, the YB at home against FCB, with a capacity crowd of 31,120 spectators. Both teams started well into this so-called "Finalissima" and both teams created their chances. However, after Alberto Regazzoni was cautioned for a foul on Valentin Stocker in the 23rd minute, Basel won control of the game and home goalkeeper Marco Wölfli was forced to make a good save following Scott Chipperfield's left footed shot. Jacques Zoua had a good shock blocked and Stocker failed to connect to a cross from the right. In the 38th minute a cross from defender Scott Sutter gave Seydou Doumbia, the YB top scorer his first chance, but the header went wide. Directly after this Basel game forward with a long ball from Zoua to Carlitos, controlling the ball well he saw Stocker free on the other side of the penalty area. Carlitos played a long pass, the ball bounced high on the artificial grass field, but the winger was able to flick the ball into the net. Then, exactly on the hour, a left footed cross from Stocker found Scott Chipperfield unmarked in front of goal and he was able to head home and give Basel a 2–0 win.

Seydou Doumbia became league top goal scorer with 30 goals. Joint second top scorer in the league was Basel's top scorer Marco Streller with 21 goals. He was level with Cristian Ianu from FC Luzern and Émile Mpenza from FC Sion. Second top scorer in the team was Alexander Frei with 15, third was Scott Chipperfield with 13, followed by Valentin Stocker with 12 and Benjamin Huggel with 11 goals. The team achieved their aim by winning the championship.

=== Domestic Cup ===
Basel entered the 2009–10 Swiss Cup in the first round of the competition and the team's clear aim for the Cup was to win it. In the first round, teams from the Super League and Challenge League were seeded and could not play against each other. In a match, the home advantage was granted to the team from the lower league, if applicable.

SC Cham (20 September 2009)

Basel were drawn against SC Cham, who at that time played in the 1. Liga, the third tier of Swiss football. The match was played at the Herti Allmend Stadion in Zug with a sold-out capacity crowd of 5,210 spectators. Basel dominated their opponents, although they were able to hold on until shortly before the half time whistle. In the 44th minute Federico Almerares was able to put the visitors into the lead. Shortly after the break it was again Almerares who scored Basel's second goal and in 76th minute Orhan Mustafi netted their third. The hosts were getting tired, but although the visitors were creating chances, a shot from Alexander Frei hit the cross-bar, Basel could not increase the score. With the result at 3–0 Basel advanced to the second round.

Le Mont (17 October 2009)

Teams from the Super League were seeded in the second round and could not play each other. In a match, the home advantage was granted to the team from the lower league, if applicable. Basel were drawn against FC Le Mont-sur-Lausanne, who at that time were semi-professional and played in the Challenge League, the second tier of Swiss football. The match was played at Stade Olympique de la Pontaise in front of 1,000 spectators. Basel dominated their opponents from the first minutes. After a corner in the fifth minute and a header from David Abraham a Le Mont defender was able to clear from the goal-line. But then Marco Aratore, Marco Streller and Federico Almerares scored the goals to put Basel three up before half time. Le Mont never gave up and fought until the end. In the 63rd minute Renato Rocha pulled a goal back for the home time, but there wasn't enough for more. With a 3–1 away win Basel advanced to the third round.

Zürich (20 November 2009)

In the third round, the ties were drawn, there was no seeding, everyone could meet everyone. The home advantage was granted to the team from the lower league, otherwise to the team that was drawn first. Basel were drawn at home against top tier Zürich and the game was watched by 17,749 supporters. Both teams started well, the game was intensive and both teams created chances. Valentin Stocker was able to score a goal after 17 minutes and this put the home team at an advantage. Zürich reacted and Dusan Djurić with their best chance managed the equaliser after 32 minutes. This was the score at half-time and after the break Basel pressed forwards. In the 53rd minute Alexander Frei put the home team in front. Basel were now in control of the game. Again Frei, just five minutes later, scored to put the home them further into the lead. In the 75th minute Marco Streller put the ball into the Zürich net and the game was as much as decided. In the second minute of over-time Alexandre Alphonse was lucky to collect a diagonal ball from his teammate and he netted to make the final score 4–2 for the home team, who thus advanced to the quarterfinals.

Biel-Bienne (12 December 2009)

The quarterfinals were played as the last match of the year and gave Basel another home tie in the St. Jakob-Park. Their opponents were second tier Biel-Bienne and they were watched by a crowd of just 7,503 people. They saw the favourites take control of the game from the very beginning, but the favorites could not profit from their dominance immediately. In the sixth minute Marcos Gelabert saw his shot rebound from the post and in the ninth minute he saw his header rebound from the cross-bar. Basel kept playing forwards, creating chances and in the 24th minute Xherdan Shaqiri also saw his shot rebound from the goal-post. Eventually the goal had to come and in the 45th minute Alexander Frei put the home team in front. After an hour of play Frei doubled up and nine minutes later Marco Streller managed the third. Although immediately after the restart Dennis Hediger pulled a goal back for the visitors the game was decided and Basel won 3–1 to advance to the semi-finals.

Kriens (5 April 2010)

The semi-finals were played on the afternoon of Easter Monday and Basel were drawn away against SC Kriens. The match was played in the Stadion Kleinfeld in front of over 5,000 spectators, the conditions were dry but not warm. Basel were missing goalkeeper Franco Costanzo, midfielder Cabral, and their two Swiss international forwards Alexander Frei and Marco Streller due to injury. Their midfielder Valentin Stocker returned for the first time to the club where he had played his early youth football before he moved to Basel in 2005. He was received with a warm welcome from the fans, but was also the victim of the first considerably hard foul during the first minutes of the game. Both teams seemed to make no progress during the early stages and it took up until the 17th minute before the first chance was created. Basel's midfielder Marcos Gelabert played a long diagonal cross from the left side, defender Patrik Baumann was unable to clear the ball and Federico Almerares, who was positioned behind him, put the favorites a goal up. Kriens forward Janko Pacar had two good chances for the home side, one before the break and one after, but they both failed. Basel controlled the game during the second half, but the game became much more physical, the Kriens team collected four yellow cards and the Basel team three, but the narrow result remained until the end. Basel won 1–0 and thus advanced to the final.

Lausanne-Sport (9 May 2010)

Basel's opponents in the final were Lausanne-Sport, who at that time played in the Challenge League, the second tier of Swiss football. Lausanne had qualified for the final beat beating top tier St. Gallen 2–1 in the semi-final. The final was played in the St. Jakob-Park in front of 30,100 spectators and under these was also Swiss international team manager Ottmar Hitzfeld. Basel were clear favourites and the two young international players Valentin Stocker in the 28th minute and Xherdan Shaqiri two minutes later put Basel into a comfortable two goal lead by half-time. Just one minute into the second half Jacques Zoua added the third and six minutes later Scott Chipperfield the fourth. The captain of the Swiss international team Alexander Frei came on as a substitute in the 67th minute, making his comeback after being out injured fracture of his right arm since February. Frei gave the assist as Stocker scored the fifth. The final score was 6–0 as international Benjamin Huggel scored with a header in the last minute of the game. It had been a fair game, referee Sascha Kever did not have to show a single yellow card.

Conclusion

Basel won the Swiss Cup for the tenth time in the club's history. Basel achieved the double this season and thus completed their domestic aims. As finalists of the Swiss Cup, Lausanne qualified for the second qualification round of the UEFA Europa League.

=== UEFA Cup ===
Basel's clear aim for this competition was to reach the group stage and to advance to the knock-out stage, which was to start after the winter break.

==== Second qualifying round ====
Basel entered the 2009–10 UEFA Europa League in the second qualifying round and were drawn against Andorrans Santa Coloma.

Santa Coloma (16 July 2009)

The first leg was at home in the St. Jakob-Park in front of over 25'000 spectators and this high amount of spectators was because the club granted free entry to everybody. Basel were clear favorites to win the match and so new head-coach Thorsten Fink used the opportunity to bring some young players from the U-21 team into the squad. Basel started well and pushed forward as expected. In the 5th minute Santa Colma goalkeeper Ricardo Fernandez had to react quickly to deflect a shot from Benjamin Huggel onto the post. It was one of the youngsters in the starting eleven Serkan Şahin who put the hosts a goal up after 23 minutes. In the 28th minute Antônio da Silva netted again for Basel, but the linesman ruled him offside. Three minutes after half time Marco Streller scored Basel's second goal and in the 59th minute Federico Almerares scored as well and the match ended 3–0 in Basel's favour.

Return match (23 July 2009)

The second leg was played in Estadi Comunal d'Aixovall one week later. Basel again dominated their opponents and Marco Streller put them ahead in the 12th minute. Two minutes later Marcos Gelabert doubled up. Five minutes before the break Santa Coloma's Argentinian defender José Daniel Álvarez was unlucky and deflected a ball passed his own goalkeeper. Directly afterwards Santa Coloma pressed forward and the Basel defence brought Maicon down. He took the spot-kick himself sending goalkeeper Franco Costanzo the wrong way. Basel dominated the second half, but could not create dangerous situations until the final minutes. Three minutes from time substitute Federico Almerares ran clear and scored his goal to and the match ended with a 4–1 away victory for Basel, thus victors with a 7–1 on aggregate.

==== Third qualifying round ====
FCB were then drawn against KR Reykjavík of Iceland in the third qualifying round. They in their turn had beaten Greek team Larissa in the previous qualifying round.

KR Reykjavík (30 July 2009)

The first leg took place at KR-völlur on a dry and sunny pitch on 30 July in front of 1,500 spectators. Basel had started well, but the goal scored by Alexander Frei after four minutes was disallowed due to an off-side decision by Spanish referee Fernando Teixeira Vitienes. Then, early goals from Gudmundur Benediktsson, after six minutes, and Grétar Sigurdsson, on nine minutes, gave the home side a 2–0 lead. Basel took control of the game after this early shock, they played well together and pressed forwards, but it was not until the 58th minute before Scott Chipperfield pulled one back and until the 83rd minute before Federico Almerares levelled the score. Basel came away with a deserved two all draw.

Return match (6 August 2009)

The second leg in Switzerland took place and a sunny and warm evening in front of 13,117 spectators. Head-coach Thorsten Fink again made multiple changes to the starting eleven, but the players understood themselves well and played an attacking football with both Alexander Frei and Marco Streller coming to early chances. Frei then used a good Streller pass to put the home team a goal up after 29 minutes. Seconds before half time Marcos Gelabert challenge on Takefusa was ruled as penalty and because Gelabert protested he was shown a second yellow card and sent-off. Takefusa sunk the spot-kick leaving keeper Franco Costanzo with no chance. Despite being a man less in the second half Basel pushed forward. A free-kick from Scott Chipperfield in the 77th minute hit the near post and the next chance was netted by Xherdan Shaqiri to put the hosts in front again. The visitors were under pressure and defending with all they had and picked up three yellow cards for fouls in just three minutes. Basel were awarded a penalty on 79 minutes and Alex Frei converted it as the match ended with a 3–1 win for Basel, meaning they won 5–3 on aggregate.

==== Play-off round ====
Basel progressed to the play-off round. With their coefficient 51.050 they were seeded and were drawn against FK Baku of Azerbaijan with one of the lowest coefficients 0.899. Baku had dropped into this round after being eliminated from the 2009–10 UEFA Champions League qualifying phase (Champions Path) by Levski Sofia. Basel were clear favourites, but although Baku meant that there would be an arduous journey to Azerbaijan, on the other hand the chances of success were extremely good.

Baku (20 August 2009)

The first leg was played in Baku at Tofik Bakhramov Stadium as Baku's normal grounds Guzanli Olympic Stadium did not meet UEFA criteria. The attendance was some 13,000 people and the referee was Zsolt Szabó from the Hungarian Football Federation. He was called into action very early because of the hard ways of playing, there were three/four hard fouls and then after another Ernad Skulić was shown the yellow card in the third minute. The game calmed from then immediately and both teams played well, especially the visitors, but it was Fernando Nestor Pérez who put the locals 1–0 ahead just after half time. Basel head-coach Thorsten Fink then reacted and substituted in the two attacking midfielders Carlitos and Xherdan Shaqiri for the defensive players Samuel Inkoom and Behrang Safari. The changes worked-out and the team turned it around and won 3–1, scoring three goals in six minutes, these coming two from Marco Streller and the other from Benjamin Huggel.

Return match (27 August 2009)

One week later the second leg at St. Jakob-Park took place in front of 7,113 spectators. Basel started well and created chances. In the 32nd minute Federico Almerares eventually converted one of their chances to give them the lead. The players were still celebrating their first success and did not concentrate as Baku played a fast counter-attack, Felipe Almeida Félix took his chance and put the teams level again. It was Basel's turn to react and they did. Marcos Gelabert put the hosts 2–1 up on 36 minutes. Basel were in control of the match and in the second half Alexander Frei, Benjamin Huggel and Xherdan Shaqiri each added another goal. The match ended with Basel winning 5–1 on the night and 8–2 on aggregate.

==== Group stage ====
The victory in the play-offs meant that Basel qualified for the Europa League group stage. The group stage featured the 38 winners of the play-off round and the 10 losing sides of the Champions League play-off round. The draw for the group stage was held in Monaco on 28 August 2009. The matches in group stage took place between 17 September and 17 December 2009. FCB were then drawn into Group E alongside A.S. Roma (Italy), Fulham (England) and CSKA Sofia (Bulgaria).

Roma (17 September 2009)

Basel started in the group with a home game against Roma. It was a cloudy day and, in the evening, it was warm with about 18 °C, but the pitch in the St. Jakob-Park was damp. Basel started fast into the game, in 11th minute Carlitos shot the hosts into the lead. A loose ball fell in front of Cabral's feet and he immediately passed it to Carlitos, who, with a first-time drive from about 30 metres found the bottom corner of the goal. Then an intense period of pressure from the Roma team followed. Francesco Totti sent a dipping free-kick which hit the top of the crossbar and John Arne Riise's long-range drive was deflected wide. Alexander Frei nearly doubled the hosts' lead, but he was stopped by a good challenge from Philippe Mexès. Soon after Marco Streller had a powerful header tipped over the bar, following a good move down the right flank. In the 72nd minute Streller then hit the crossbar with a very good volley. A late breakaway by substitute Federico Almerares earned Basel an impressive victory and the three points, just three minutes from time, as he was sent clear by Frei and calmly rounded Júlio Sérgio to score and make it a 2–0 win.

Fulham (1 October 2009)

Matchday 2 in the group stage saw Basel make their first ever visit to Craven Cottage and some 16,000 supporters were in the stadium to see a tight encounter between Fulham and the visitors. Referee was German Michael Weiner, it was a cloudy evening and the pitch was dry. Basel started well and were in charge of the game, as in the 13th minute as their winger Behrang Safari out ran Fulham defender Stephen Kelly wide on the touchline and he played an exact pass to Alexander Frei, but the striker placed his shot the wrong side of the post. Basel midfield Benjamin Huggel hooked a half-volley over the bar after 20 minutes and he was guilty of another miss four minutes later, after Marco Streller had headed on a ball to leave him with only keeper Mark Schwarzer to beat. The visitors had much the better first period. Fulhaim manager Roy Hodgson must have said harsh words to his team because the team played better after the break. Basel still played somewhat better, but Fulham captain Danny Murphy struck with a low drive in the 57th minute and this remained the only goal of the game, as his side then won 1–0 to climb to the top of Group table.

CSKA Sofia (22 October 2009)

Basel's third match in the group stage took place on 22 October and was an away game against CSKA Sofia. CSKA Sofia played their home group matches at Vasil Levski National Stadium as their Balgarska Armiya Stadium did not meet UEFA criteria. Referee was Jorge Sousa from Portugal, the weather was cloudy and cool, the pitch was soft and there were 25,000 spectators. Basel started slowly, but were in charge of the game and were always looking dangerous whenever they pushed forward. Basel took the lead in the 20th-minute, as Marco Streller let a long ball bounce past him to Alexander Frei, who was able to chest it down and place his shot beyond keeper Ivan Karadzhov who was rushing towards him. Frei could have scored his second goal as he burst through between two defenders in the 39th minute, but he shot wide. Basel kept up their momentum, but CSKA didn't bring much to stand at the other end. After the half time break Frei had another chance, only a last gasp tackle by substitute Aleksandar Branekov denied him on the hour. In the 63rd minute he did manage his second goal as he rose highest to head home a cross that came from the right from Carlitos. Keeper Karadzhov then managed to parry a further another Frei effort following a goalmouth hustle. Basel came home with a 2–0 victory.

CSKA Sofia (5 November 2009)

Matchday four was the return game against the Bulgarians and this was played two weeks later in St. Jakob-Park with 15,255 spectators. Referee was Oleh Oriekhov from the Football Federation of Ukraine, the weather was cloudy and the pitch was soft. Basel head coach Thorsten Fink was forced to change his team because of injuries to goalkeeper Franco Costanzo, defender David Abraham and midfielders Carlitos and Antônio da Silva. The visitors were the team playing better during the first half-hour and Basel were forced to defend in the early stages, but the game changed dramatically in just six minutes. After 35 minutes Marcos Gelabert opened the score, as Valentin Stocker laid the ball into his path and his 20-metre shot was slightly deflected as it made its way into the goal, beyond the reach of keeper Zdravko Chavdarov. Six minutes later Bulgarian defender Aleksandar Branekov fouled Alexander Frei in the penalty area and he converted the spot-kick himself. In the 61st minute CSKA came back into the match as Marquinhos's corner flew over all the central players and found Todor Yanchev, who was able to control the ball with his chest and to score with a looping shot beyond goalkeeper Massimo Colomba. However the CSKA revival didn't last long, because only six minutes later Benjamin Huggel's long pass over flew the defence and came to Frei, who moved neatly past Chavdarov and push the ball into the empty net. Frei struck twice against CSKA for the second game running. This was the goal to 3–1 and this score remained until the end.

Roma (3 December 2009)

The return game against Roma on matchday five was played in Stadio Olimpico in front of 27,000 spectators. Basel began well, the team was daring and venturesome, the Italians started somewhat slow. Basel took a deserved lead after 18 minutes as a left-wing cross from Valentin Stocker to the near post was headed home by Basel captain Benjamin Huggel. Roma were then forced to increase their pressure and they did, Simone Perrotta had two near misses within four minutes. Then Cicinho's cross flew high into the penalty area, Marcos Gelabert pulled back Francesco Totti and referee Tony Chapron from the French Football Federation whistled for a spot-kick. Totti himself converted the penalty beyond keeper Stefan Wessels's left hand. Basel started into the second half as they had at the beginning of the game, acting dangerously. Ten minutes after the break keeper Júlio Sérgio did well to tip an Alexander Frei effort over the top. Roma then increased their pressure again and a series of first-time passes ended with Daniele De Rossi playing the ball behind the Basel back line to Mirko Vučinić and his left-footed shot put his team into the lead. During the closing stages Marco Streller forced keeper Sérgio to make a save with his feet and Alexander Frei hit the cross-bar but the visitors were unable to equalise. The game ended 2–1 for Roma, leaving Basel's fate hinging on the final match against Fulham.

Fulham (16 December 2009)

Matchday six, the return game against Fulham, was played in the St. Jakob-Park in front of 20,063 spectators. The pitch was wet after rain, this turned to snow and the temperature dropped to freezing point. The outcome of this group was far from being decided, Roma were group leaders with ten points, Basel were second with nine points and Fulham had eight points. Roma were already qualified for the knock-out stage and one of the two teams playing here were to advance as well, Basel needed not to lose. The match started level on terms, neither side playing better than the other, but neither creating many good chances. However, Bobby Zamora scored twice in three minutes just before half-time to put the Premier League side two in front at the break. Zamora nearly completed his hat-trick just following the beak, but reserve keeper Massimo Colomba stretched and saved his free-kick. Alexander Frei pulled one back with a second-half penalty in the 64th minute following a handball, but then in the 77th minute Zoltán Gera restored the visitors two-goal lead. However, the visitors' nerves were fraying during the closing stages and in the 87th minute Marco Streller headed home. This gave Basel hope of a draw and that would have sent them through to the next round, Fulham were happy that they survived the nerve-wracking last few minutes.

Conclusion

In a close game, the English club had narrowly won 3–2, sending Basel out of the competition with third place in the Group Table. This meant that Basel's aim for the European competition was not quite achieved, their hopes had been to advance to the knock-out stage. Group winners A.S. Roma were eliminated in the next round, being defeated twice 3–2 by Panathinaikos. Fulham advanced to the final in the HSH Nordbank Arena in Hamburg but were defeated 2–1 after extra time by Atlético Madrid.

== Club ==
=== FC Basel Holding AG ===
The FC Basel Holding AG (Holding) owns 75% of the club FC Basel (FC Basel 1893 AG) and the other 25% is owned by the club members. Chairwoman of the Holding was Gisela Oeri. She owned 91.96% of the shares. The other 8,04% of the shares were owned by a group of investors, these being Manor AG, J. Safra Sarasin, Novasearch AG, MCH Group AG and Weitnauer Holding AG. As chairwoman of the holding Ms Oeri was also chairwoman of the club.

=== Club management ===
The club's board of directors remained in the same constellation as in the previous season.

One of the most important occurrences during the year 2010 was the formation of the Nachwuchs Campus Basel, to English foundation Youth Campus Basel. This was founded by then FCB chairwoman Gigi Oeri with the aim of promoting youth football in Basel on a sustainable basis. The purpose of the foundation is the integral training and promotion of young football talents in football, schooling, education and personality. The first managing director of the foundation was Benno Kaiser and he was also in the club's board of directors. Since its formation, the foundation owns the accommodation centre which provides space for youth players and offers them supervised accommodation and nutrition. The foundation was to aid in the administration of the club's youth department. The foundation was to build, later to run and maintain the campus grounds.

Chairwoman	(Switzerland) Mrs Gisela Oeri
Vice Chairman	(Switzerland) Mr Bernhard Heusler
Finances	(Switzerland) Mr Stephan Werthmüller
Sportdirector	(Switzerland) Mr Georg Heitz
Marketing	(Switzerland) Mr René Kamm
Director	(Switzerland) Mr Reto Baumgartner
Director	(Switzerland) Mr Dominik Donzé
Director	(Switzerland) Mr Benno Kaiser
Ground (capacity and dimensions)	St. Jakob-Park (38,512) (37,500 for international matches / 120x80 m)

Source: Official Site

=== Team management ===
Position	Staff
Manager	(Germany) Thorsten Fink
Assistant manager	(Germany) Heiko Vogel
Conditioning Coach	(Switzerland) Marco Walker
Fitness Coach	(Croatia) Nikola Vidović
Fitness Coach	(Switzerland) Romain Crevoisier
Team Administration	(Switzerland) Gustav Nussbaumer
Youth Team Coach	(Switzerland) Patrick Rahmen
Youth Team Co-Coach	(Switzerland) Sandro Kamber

Last updated: 17 May 2008

=== Kit ===
Supplier: Nike
Sponsor(s): Novartis

Home	Away

Source: Official Site

== Players ==
=== First team ===
As of 7 October 2009, accounting for official transfers: Note: Flags indicate national team as defined under FIFA eligibility rules; some limited exceptions apply. Players may hold more than one non-FIFA nationality.

No.	Pos.	Nation	Player
1	GK	ARG	Franco Costanzo (Captain)
3	DF	ALG	Sabri Boumelaha
4	DF	TUR	Çağdaş Atan
5	DF	SUI	Dominik Ritter
6	MF	ARG	Marcos Gelabert
7	MF	SUI	Pascal Schürpf
8	MF	SUI	Benjamin Huggel (Vice-captain)
9	FW	SUI	Marco Streller
10	MF	SRB	Marko Perović
11	MF	AUS	Scott Chipperfield
13	FW	SUI	Alexander Frei
14	MF	SUI	Valentin Stocker
15	FW	ARG	Federico Almerares
17	MF	SUI	Xherdan Shaqiri
18	GK	GER	Stefan Wessels

No.	Pos.	Nation	Player
19	DF	ARG	David Abraham
20	DF	SWE	Behrang Safari
21	DF	FRA	François Marque
22	DF	GHA	Samuel Inkoom
23	GK	SUI	Massimo Colomba
24	MF	SUI	Cabral
25	MF	BRA	Antônio da Silva
26	MF	SUI	Daniel Ünal
27	MF	SUI	Marco Aratore
28	DF	SUI	Beg Ferati
29	FW	SUI	Orhan Mustafi
30	MF	POR	Carlitos
31	FW	CMR	Jacques Zoua
32	DF	SUI	Reto Zanni (Vice-captain)
33	DF	TUR	Serkan Şahin
35	GK	SUI	Oliver Klaus

=== Multiple Nationality ===
- 1 (Argentina) (Italy) Franco Costanzo
- 3 (Algeria) (France) Sabri Boumelaha
- 11 (Australia) (Switzerland) Scott Chipperfield
- 13 (Switzerland) (Turkey) Daniel Unal
- 15 (Argentina) (Italy) Federico Almerares
- 17 (Switzerland) (Kosovo) Xherdan Shaqiri
- 20 (Sweden) (Iran) Behrang Safari
- 23 (Switzerland) (Italy) Massimo Colomba
- 24 (Switzerland) (Cape Verde) Cabral
- 28 (Switzerland) (Kosovo) Beg Ferati
- 33 (Turkey) (Switzerland) Serkan Şahin

=== 2009–10 Summer transfers ===
==== In ====
3	DF	ALG	Sabri Boumelaha (from Basel U-21)
4	DF	TUR	Çağdaş Atan (from Energie Cottbus – Free)
5	DF	SUI	Dominik Ritter (loan return from Concordia Basel)
7	MF	SUI	Pascal Schürpf (loan return from Concordia Basel)
13	FW	SUI	Alexander Frei (from Borussia Dortmund – 6.4 million SFr)
17	MF	SUI	Xherdan Shaqiri (from Basel U-21)
18	GK	GER	Stefan Wessels (Free Agent)
22	DF	GHA	Samuel Inkoom (from Asante Kotoko – 800,000 SFr)
23	GK	SUI	Massimo Colomba (from Grasshopper Club Zürich – Free)
24	MF	SUI	Cabral (loan return from Sevilla)
25	MF	BRA	Antônio da Silva (Loan from Karlsruhe – 450,000 SFr)
27	MF	SUI	Marco Aratore (from Basel U-21)
31	FW	CMR	Jacques Zoua (from Cotonsport Garoua)
35	GK	SUI	Oliver Klaus (from Basel U-21)

==== Out ====
2	DF	SUI	Ronny Hodel (to FK Ventspils – Free)
7	MF	GER	Jürgen Gjasula (to FSV Frankfurt – Free)
17	FW	CHI	Eduardo Rubio (loan return to Cruz Azul)
22	MF	SRB	Ivan Ergić (to Bursaspor – Free)
23	FW	BRA	Eduardo (contract not re-newed)
31	FW	SUI	Eren Derdiyok (to Bayer 04 Leverkusen – 7.4 million SFr)
35	GK	SUI	Oliver Stöckli (retired)

==== Out on loan ====
16	MF	SUI	Fabian Frei (on loan to St. Gallen)
18	GK	SUI	Jayson Leutwiler (on loan to Yverdon Sport)
27	GK	SUI	Yann Sommer (on loan to Grasshopper)
29	FW	SUI	Orhan Mustafi (on loan to FC Aarau)

== Competitions ==
=== Overall ===
Basel participated in the following major competitions: the Swiss Super League, the Swiss Cup and the UEFA Europa League.

Competition	Started round	Final position / round	First match	Last match
Swiss Super League	—	Winner	12 July 2009	16 May 2010
Swiss Cup	Round 1	Winner	20 September 2009	9 May 2010
UEFA Europa League	Second qualifying round	Group stage	16 July 2009	16 December 2009

Source: Competitions

== Results and fixtures ==
=== Friendlies ===
==== Pre- and mid-season friendlies ====
22 June 2009 Pre-season	Basel	3–1	FC Gossau	San Gian, Celerina
15:30	Almerares 11' (pen. 1:0); Mustafi 58' (2:1); Aratore 71' (3:1)	Summary	37' (1:1)	Attendance: 200; Referee: Alain Bieri
Note: Fair game, no yellow cards

24 June 2009 Pre-season	Basel	2–2	Bellinzona	San Gian, Celerina
16:00	Mustafi 7' (1:0); Schindelholz 88' (2:2)	Summary	33' (1:1) Sermeter; 57' (1:2) Lustrinelli	Attendance: 200; Referee: Philipp Stomeo
Note: Fair game, no yellow cards

24 June 2009 Pre-season	Basel	2–0	FC Wohlen	San Gian, Celerina
18:00	Gelabert 10' (1:0); F. Frei 73' (2:0)	Summary		Attendance: 200; Referee: Pascal Erlachner
Note: Fair game, no yellow cards

26 June 2009 Pre-season	Vaduz	0–5	Basel	Sportspark, Sargans
16:30	Kempe (yellow card) 59'	Summary	7' (0:1) Almerares; (yellow card) 30' Şahin; 34' (0:2) Huggel; (yellow card) 44' Çağdaş; 69' (0:3) Mustafi; 84' (0:4) Perović; 88' (0:5) F. Frei	Attendance: 700; Referee: Michele Cassiani

30 June 2009 Pre-season	Basel	2–0	FC Grenchen	Sports facilities St. Jakob, Münchenstein
19:30	Perović (yellow card) 41'; Gelabert 53' (pen. 1:0); Almerares 57' (2:0)	Summary	(yellow card) 53' Molina	Attendance: 1,000; Referee: Remo Lanfranchi

6 July 2009 Uhrencup	Basel	2–0	Panathinaikos	Stadion Brühl, Grenchen
20:30	Almerares 65' (1:0); Huggel 86' (2:0)	Summary	(yellow card) 22' (yellow-red card) 78' Karagounis	Attendance: 7,000; Referee: Bruno Grossen

8 July 2009 Uhrencup	Basel	0–3	Shakhtar Donetsk	Stadion Brühl, Grenchen
19:30	Gelabert (yellow card) 39'; Perović (yellow card) 59'	Summary	(yellow card) 37' Rakitskyi; 57' (0:1) Chyhrynskyi; (yellow card) 61' Fernandinho; 63' (0:2) Aghahowa; 65' (0:3) Jádson	Attendance: 4,197; Referee: Stéphan Studer

4 September 2009 Mid-season	Basel	3–1	Biel-Bienne	Stadion FC Solothurn, Solothurn
19:00	Almerares 44' (1:1); Kulcar 50' (2:1); G. Xhaka 63' (3:1)	Summary	Morello 30' (1:0)	Attendance: 600; Referee: Adrien Jaccottet
Note: FCB with test player Kristjan Kulcar and from the U-21 Granit Xhaka, Roman Buess and Dennis Iapichino

5 October 2009 Mid-season	SV Rust	1–5	Basel	Allmendwald, Rust
17:15	Herdrich 1' (1:0)	Summary	22' (1:1) Almerares; 43' (1:2) Almerares (1:3) Unal; 76' (1:4) Almerares; 89' (1:5) Almerares	Attendance: 200; Referee: Justus Zorn

13 October 2009 Mid-season	Sissach-Gelterkinden Selection	1–12	Basel	Tannenbrunn, Sissach
19:00	Till Vogt 54' (1:4)	Summary	29' (0:1) Almerares; 42' (0:2) Streller; 49' (0:3) Streller; 51' (0:4) Shaqiri; 58' (1:5) Aratore; 63' (1:6) da Silva; 69' (1:7) Osmani; 71' (1:8) Shaqiri; 72' (1:9) da Silva; 73' (1:10) Unal; 80' (1:11) da Silva; 82' (1:12) Osmani	Attendance: 1,800; Referee: Remo Lanfranchi
Note: FCB with players from U-21: Xherdan Shaqiri, Altin Osmani and Oliver Klaus and test player Willian Ferreira

13 November 2009 Mid-season	SC Freiburg	3–2	Basel	Europa-Stadion, Rheinfelden
18:00	Roth 16' (1:0); Caligiuri 45' (2:1); Schuster 50' (pen. 3:1)	Summary	39' (pen. 1:1) Zanni; 89' (3:2) Perović	Attendance: 1,900; Referee: Michael Kempter
Note: Game for the 100th anniversary of FC Rheinfelden 09

24 November 2009 Mid-season	Basel	3–2	FC Basel U-21	Sports facilities St. Jakob, Münchenstein
	Unal 21' (1:2); Gelabert 35' (2:0); Aratore 45' (3:2)	Summary	11' (0:1) Eigenmann; 19' (0:2) Ferreira	Attendance: 50; Referee: Stephan Benz

==== Winter Break and mid-season friendlies ====
9 January 2010 Winter Break	SC Freiburg	1–2	Basel	Dreisamstadion
19:00	Mendy 11' (1:1)	Summary	7' (0:1) Stocker; 57' (1:2) Almerares	Attendance: 1,000; Referee: Matthias Jöllenbeck

11 January 2010 Winter Break	Basel	3–0	FC Basel U-21	Stadion Schützenmatte, Basel
16:20	Ferati 32' (1:0); Ritter 61' (2:0); Almerares 75' (3:0)	Summary		Attendance: 120

12 January 2010 Winter Break	Basel	1–3	Bayern Munich	St. Jakob-Park, Basel
19:00	Streller 10' (1:0); Çağdaş (yellow card) 39'	Summary	73' (1:1) Altıntop; 85' (1:2) Klose; 87' (1:3) Klose	Attendance: 20,087; Referee: Claudio Circhetta

16 January 2010 Winter Break	AZ Alkmaar	2–0	Basel	MPFS, San Pedro de Alcántara
14:00	Mendes da Silva 36' (1:0); Lens 70' (2:0); Swerts (yellow card)	Summary	(yellow card) Marque; (yellow card) Gelabert	Referee: José Marin

18 January 2010 Winter Break	FK Pelister	1–5	Basel	Estadio Polideportivo Municipal, San Pedro de Alcántara
16:00	Bujcevsk 72' (1:2)	Summary	7' (0:1) Huggel; 12' (0:2) Huggel; 75' (1:3) G. Xhaka; 82' (1:4) Schürpf; 84' (1:5) Almerares	Attendance: 150; Referee: Vicente Tirado Troyano

22 January 2010 Winter Break	Viking FK	0–4	Basel	Estadio Polideportivo Municipal, San Pedro de Alcántara
16:00		Summary	23' (0:1) Almerares; 70' (0:2) Huggel; 72' (0:3) Almerares; 74' (0:4) Shaqiri	Referee: José Marin

26 January 2010 Winter Break	Basel	2–1	FC Wohlen	Stadion Rankhof, Basel
16:00	F. Frei 34' (1:0); F. Frei 62' (2:0)	Summary	76' (2:1) Marjanovic	Attendance: 200; Referee: Reto Walker

31 January 2010 Winter Break	Basel	0–2	Wil	Stadion Rankhof, Basel
15:00		Summary	27' (0:1) Čavušević; 40' (0:2) Lezcano	Attendance: 1,100; Referee: Claudio Circhetta

3 February 2010 Winter Break	Nordstern Basel	1–7	Basel	Stadion Rankhof, Basel
18:30	Puymege 45' (1:5)	Summary	13' (o.g. 0:1) Achache; 22' (0:2) Hasler; 25' (0:3) Hasler; 35' (0:4) Almerares; 44' (0:5) Almerares; 77' (1:6) Perović; 87' (1:7) Schürpf	Attendance: 260; Referee: Adrien Jaccottet (Basel)
Note: FCB with three players from their U-21 team: David Hasler, Marc Dinkel and Niki Wiedmann

10 February 2010 Mid-season	Basel	2–0	Thun	Stadion Schützenmatte, Basel
16:00	Almerares 54' (1:0); Perović 84' (2:0)	Summary		Referee: Reto Walker

17 February 2010 Mid-season	Basel	3–1	FC Gossau	Stadion Rankhof, Basel
17:00	Schürpf 43' (1:0); Schürpf 52' (2:0); Almerares 77' (3:1)	Summary	65' (pen. 2:1) Todisco; (yellow card) 67' Soljic	Attendance: 200; Referee: Adrien Jaccottet

24 February 2010 Mid-season	Basel	1–2	Yverdon-Sports	Stadion Rankhof, Basel
17:00	Chipperfield 75' (1:2)	Summary	5' (0:1) Osmani; 43' (0:2) Zari	Attendance: 350; Referee: Marco Speranda

3 March 2010 Mid-season	Basel	3–0	Winterthur	Stadion Rankhof, Basel
15:30	Almerares 18' (1:0); Almerares 19' (2:0); Almerares 73' (3:0)	Summary		Attendance: 200; Referee: Reto Walker

10 March 2010 Mid-season	Old Boys	0–5	Basel	Stadion Schützenmatte, Basel
19:00		Summary	38' (1:0) Almerares; 49' (2:0) Schürpf; 69' (3:0) Schürpf; 81' (4:0) Zoua; 85' (5:0) Aratore	Attendance: 510

17 March 2010 Mid-season	Basel	2–0	FC Liestal	Stadion Rankhof, Basel
18:30	Almerares 7' (1:0); Zoua 70' (2:0)	Summary		Attendance: 250; Referee: Pascal Erlachner

28 April 2010 Mid-season	FC Aesch	0–5	Basel	Löhrenacker, Aesch
18:00		Summary	17' (0:1) Almerares; 25' (0:2) Zoua; 35' (0:3) Almerares; 56' (0:4) Carlitos; 67' (0:5) Gelabert	Attendance: 2,385; Referee: Stephan Benz

=== Swiss Super League ===
==== First half of season ====
12 July 2009 Round 1	St. Gallen	2–0	Basel	AFG Arena, St. Gallen
16:00 CEST	M. Costanzo (yellow card) 43'; Koubský (yellow card) 45'; Frick 51' (1:0); M. Costanzo 82' (2:0); Cáceres (yellow card) 83' (yellow card)	Summary	(yellow card) 38' Stocker; (yellow card) 60' Inkoom; (yellow card) 81' Ferati; (red card) 82' Huggel; (yellow card) 90+3' Mustafi	Attendance: 19,500; Referee: (Switzerland) Massimo Busacca

19 July 2009 Round 2	Basel	2–1	Aarau	St. Jakob-Park, Basel
16:00 CEST	Stocker 5' (1:1); Streller 90+3' (2:1)	Summary	2' (0:1) Bengondo	Attendance: 20,647; Referee: (Switzerland) Nikolaj Hänni

26 July 2009 Round 3	Sion	1–2	Basel	Tourbillon, Sion
16:00	Sarni (yellow card) 32'; Chihab (yellow card) 36'; Crettenand (yellow card) 37'; Mpenza 78' (1:1)	Summary	(21[0:1]) Stocker; (yellow card) 27' Şahin; (yellow card) 61' Stocker; (yellow card) 68' Costanzo; (yellow card) 72' Streller; (yellow card) 84' A. Frei; (yellow card) 86'; 90' A. Frei	Attendance: 15,000; Referee: (Switzerland) Sascha Kever

2 August 2009 Round 4	Basel	1–1	Luzern	St. Jakob-Park, Basel
16:00 CEST	Streller 13' (1:0); Safari (yellow card) 51'	Summary	(yellow card) 55' Lustenberger; 86' (1:1) Ianu	Attendance: 23,201; Referee: (Switzerland) Cyril Zimmermann

9 August 2009 Round 5	Basel	1–1	Zürich	St. Jakob-Park, Basel
16:00 CEST	Çağdaş (yellow card) 40'; Ferati (yellow card) 59'; Huggel 89' (1:1); A. Frei (yellow card) 90+2' (yellow-red card) 90+3'	Summary	(yellow card) 9' Margairaz; (yellow card) 50' (yellow-red card) 53' Rochat; 87' (0:1) Vonlanthen; (yellow card) 88' Vonlanthen	Attendance: 27,011; Referee: (Switzerland) Massimo Busacca

16 August 2009 Round 6	Grasshopper	3–1	Basel	Letzigrund, Zürich
16:00	Dos Santos 15' (1:0); Zárate (yellow card) 43'; Callà 61' (2:1); Voser (yellow card) 65'; Zárate 74' (3:1)	Summary	24' (1:1) Chipperfield; (yellow card) 43' Çağdaş; (yellow card) 76' Streller	Attendance: 8,900; Referee: (Switzerland) Stephan Studer

23 August 2009 Round 7	Xamax	2–2	Basel	Stade de la Maladière, Neuchâtel
16:00	Varela 58' (1:0); Gavranović 66' (2:1); Gavranović (yellow card) 67'; Stéphane Besle (yellow card) 90+1'	Summary	65' (1:1) Streller; 89' (2:2) Frei	Attendance: 7,323; Referee: (Switzerland) Sascha Kever

30 August 2009 Round 8	Basel	1–2	Young Boys	St. Jakob-Park, Basel
16:00	A. Frei 7' (1:0); Safari (yellow card) 60'; Huggel (yellow card) 77'	Summary	(yellow card) 12' Hochstrasser; (yellow card) 33' D. Degen; (yellow card) 34' Wölfli; (yellow card) 63' Ghezal; 74' (1:1) Doumbia; 90' (1:2) Ch. Schneuwly	Attendance: 27,087; Referee: (Switzerland) Bertolini

13 September 2009 Round 9	Bellinzona	2–3	Basel	Stadio Comunale Bellinzona, Bellinzona
16:00	Zotti (yellow card) 6'; Lima (yellow card) 9'; Ciarrocchi 54' (1:2); Rivera (yellow card) 62'; Thiesson (yellow card) 84'; Hima 85' (2:2); Mangiarratti (red card) 89'; Lustrinelli (yellow card) 90+2'	Summary	6' (0:1) Huggel; 32' (0:2) Stocker; (yellow card) 49' Gelabert; (yellow card) 57' Inkoom; 90' (2:3) Huggel	Attendance: 4,200; Referee: (Switzerland) Daniel Wermelinger

23 September 2009 Round 10	Basel	4–0	St. Gallen	St. Jakob-Park, Basel
19:45	Stocker 20' (1:0); Safari (yellow card) 26'; Streller 45' (2:0); Streller 53' (3:0); A. Frei 64' (4:0)	Summary	(yellow card) 34' Zellweger; (yellow card) 69' Muntwiler	Attendance: 20,239; Referee: (Switzerland) Cyril Zimmermann

26 September 2009 Round 11	Aarau	0–2	Basel	Stadion Brügglifeld, Aarau
17:45	Baykal (yellow card) 26'	Summary	(yellow card) 9' A. Frei; (yellow card) 21' Stocker; 27' (0:1) A. Frei; 28' (0:2) Stocker	Attendance: 7,900; Referee: (Switzerland) Jérôme Laperrière

4 October 2009 Round 12	Basel	5–0	Sion	St. Jakob-Park, Basel
16:00	Streller 43' (1:0); Streller 44' (2:0) (yellow card); A. Frei 78' (3:0); Chipperfield 84' (4:0); Chipperfield 86' (5:0)	Summary	(yellow card) 61' Dos Santos; (yellow card) 66' Fermino	Attendance: 20,331; Referee: (Switzerland) Stephan Studer

25 October 2009 Round 13	Luzern	4–5	Basel	Gersag, Emmenbrücke
16:00	Chiumiento 3' (1:1); Yakin (yellow card) 17'; Renggli 22' (2:2) (penalty); Frimpong (yellow card) 32'; Yakin 79' (3:3); Ianu 87' (4:3)	Summary	2' (0:1) Huggel; 8' (1:2) A. Frei; (yellow card) 17' Safari; (yellow card) 32' Çağdaş; (yellow card) 66' A. Frei; (yellow card) 69' Streller; 73' (2:3) Streller; 90+1' (4:4) A. Frei; 90+4' (4:5) Streller	Attendance: 8,695; Referee: (Switzerland) Kever

28 October 2009 Round 14	Zürich	2–2	Basel	Letzigrund, Zürich
19:45	Tico 53' (1:0); Gajić 87' (2:2)	Summary	61' (1:1) Huggel; 63' (1:2) A. Frei; (yellow card) 65' Colomba	Attendance: 14,300; Referee: (Switzerland) Bertolini

31 October 2009 Round 15	Basel	3–1	Grasshopper	St. Jakob-Park, Basel
17:45	Stocker (yellow card) 21'; Huggel 34' (1:1); Streller 41' (2:1); Abraham (red card) 60'; Inkoom (yellow card) 73'; Çağdaş (yellow card) 76'; Huggel 90+4' (3:1)	Summary	(yellow card) 23' Salatić; 28' (0:1) Smiljanic; (yellow card) 40' Lulić; (red card) 56' Vallori; (yellow card) 78' Feltscher; (yellow card) 85' Smiljanic; (red card) 92' Strasser	Attendance: 22,817; Referee: (Switzerland) Daniel Wermelinger

9 November 2009 Round 16	Basel	4–1	Xamax	St. Jakob-Park, Basel
19:45	Chipperfield 40' (1:0); Safari (yellow card) 53' (yellow-red card) 59'; A. Frei 63' (2:1); A. Frei (yellow card) 81'; Shaqiri 90+1' (3:1); Streller 90+5' (4:1)	Summary	55' (1:1) Ideye; (yellow card) 60' Bah; (yellow card) 62' Varela; (red card) 84' Gomes; (yellow card) 81' Page	Attendance: 18,483; Referee: (Switzerland) Massimo Busacca

29 November 2009 Round 17	Young Boys	2–0	Basel	Wankdorf, Bern
13:30	Doumbia 3' (1:0); Dudar (yellow card) 24'; Affolter (yellow card) 39'; Ch. Schneuwly 45' (2:0); Coly (yellow card) 70'	Summary	(yellow card) 25' Huggel; (yellow card) 25' Streller; (yellow card) 51' Chipperfield; (yellow card) 63' Stocker	Attendance: 31,120; Referee: (Switzerland) Massimo Busacca

6 December 2009 Round 18	Basel	3–2	Bellinzona	St. Jakob-Park, Basel
16:00	A. Frei 18' (1:0); Cabral 54' (2:2); A. Frei (yellow card) 70'; A. Frei 75' (3:2)	Summary	(yellow card) 7' Gashi; (yellow card) 18' Mehmeti; 35' (1:1) Ciarrocchi; 43' (1:2) Lima Solà; (yellow card) 54' Sermeter	Attendance: 17,110; Referee: (Switzerland) Bruno Grossen

==== Second half of season ====
7 February 2010 Round 19	Basel	4–0	Young Boys	St. Jakob-Park, Basel
16:00	Gelabert (yellow card) 14'; Çağdaş (yellow card) 43'; A. Frei 68' (pen. 1:0); Huggel (yellow card) 71'; Streller 81' (2:0); Gelabert 86' (3:0); Safari 90' (4:0)	Summary	(yellow card) 33' Affolter; (yellow card) 65' Doubai; (yellow card) 67' Wölfli; (yellow card) 80' Hochstrasser; (yellow card) 84' Regazzoni	Attendance: 26,054; Referee: (Switzerland) Massimo Busacca

14 February 2010 Round 20	Xamax	1–3	Basel	Stade de la Maladière, Neuchâtel
16:00	Binya (yellow card) 48'; Nuzzolo 50' (1:0); Tixier (yellow card) 19' (yellow-red card) 73'; Besle (yellow card) 82'	Summary	(yellow card) 31' Inkoom; 54' (1:1) Frei; (yellow card) 58' Çağdaş; 62' (1:2) Streller; (yellow card) 74' Shaqiri; 80' (1:3) Streller	Attendance: 4,250; Referee: (Switzerland) Stephan Studer

20 February 2010 Round 21	Basel	2–1	Aarau	St. Jakob-Park, Basel
17:45	Huggel (yellow card) 44'; Huggel 62' (1:1); Çağdaş 69' (2:1)	Summary	23' (0:1) Lang; (yellow card) 34' Elmer; (yellow card) 38' Burki; (yellow card) 47' Bengondo; (yellow card) 57' Mustafi; (yellow card) 82' Lampi	Attendance: 16,370; Referee: (Switzerland) Alain Bieri

28 February 2010 Round 22	Bellinzona	0–2	Basel	Stadio Comunale Bellinzona, Bellinzona
16:00	Lima (yellow card) 25' (yellow-red card) 61'; Djuric (yellow card) 38'; Ciarrocchi (yellow card) 42'; Edusei (yellow card) 70'	Summary	(yellow card) 39' Stocker; 45' (0:1) Chipperfield; (yellow card) 58' Streller; 62' (pen. 0:2) Streller; (yellow card) 90+1' Almerares	Attendance: 3,000; Referee: (Switzerland) Bruno Grossen

6 March 2010 Round 23	Basel	1–2	Grasshopper	St. Jakob-Park, Basel
17:45	Chipperfield 60' (1:2); Çağdaş (yellow card) 79'; Sommer (yellow card) 87'; Gelabert (yellow card) 90'; Streller (yellow card) 90+3'	Summary	3' (0:1) Colina; (yellow card) 15' Strasser; (yellow card) 25' Voser; (yellow card) 38' Cabanas; 58' (0:2) Cabanas	Attendance: 20,088; Referee: (Switzerland) Nikolaj Hänni

14 March 2010 Round 24	Luzern	0–1	Basel	Gersag, Emmenbrücke
16:00	Lambert (yellow card) 32'	Summary	33' (0:1) Huggel; (yellow card) 52' Inkoom; (yellow card) 54' Shaqiri; (yellow card) 79' Safari	Attendance: 8,597; Referee: (Switzerland) Cyril Zimmermann (46. (Switzerland) Jérôme Laperrière)

21 March 2010 Round 25	St. Gallen	2–4	Basel	AFG Arena, St. Gallen
16:00	Imhof 20' (1:2); M. Costanzo (yellow card) 32'; M. Costanzo 81' (pen. 2:3)	Summary	(yellow card) 6' da Silva; 15' (0:1) da Silva; 18' (0:2) Stocker; (yellow card) 20' Safari; 38' (1:3) Chipperfield; 90' (o.g. 2:4) Fernando	Attendance: 16,085; Referee: (Switzerland) Alain Bieri

24 March 2010 Round 26	Basel	4–1	Zürich	St. Jakob-Park, Basel
19:45	Streller 14' (1:0); Chipperfield 16' (2:0); Streller 58' (3:1); Streller (yellow card) 61'; Zoua 79' (4:1)	Summary	(yellow card) 27' Vonlanthen; 45' (2:1) Alphonse; (yellow card) 57' Gajić; (yellow card) 57' Tico; (yellow card) 59' Stahel; (yellow card) 61' Margairaz	Attendance: 27,011; Referee: (Switzerland) Massimo Busacca

27 March 2010 Round 27	Sion	2–2	Basel	Tourbillon, Sion
17:45	Vanczák (yellow card) 40'; Sauthier (yellow card) 51'; Marin 77' (1:2); Mpenza 77' (2:2); Mpenza (yellow card) 78'	Summary	11' (0:1) Streller; 22' (0:2) Streller; (yellow card) 36' Shaqiri; (yellow card) 60' Inkoom; (yellow card) 81' Streller; (yellow card) 81' Zoua	Attendance: 11,800; Referee: (Switzerland) Sascha Kever

1 April 2010 Round 28	Basel	4–3	Sion	St. Jakob-Park, Basel
19:45	Almerares 14' (1:1); Chipperfield 24' (2:2); Gelabert (yellow card) 20'; Almerares 30' (3:2); Shaqiri 53' (4:2); Huggel (yellow card) 83'	Summary	6' (0:1) Bühler; 15' (1:2) Mpenza; (yellow card) 20' Sauthier; (yellow card) 26' Marin; (yellow card) 66' Yoda; 86' (4:3) Domínguez	Attendance: 25,608; Referee: (Switzerland) Nikolaj Hänni

11 April 2010 Round 29	Zürich	1–2	Basel	Letzigrund, Zürich
16:00	Margairaz (yellow card) 6'; Margairaz 63' (1:0); Ferati (yellow card) 79'	Summary	(yellow card) 14' Huggel; (yellow card) 45' Çağdaş; 75' (1:1) Shaqiri; 77' (1:2) Almerares	Attendance: 16,300; Referee: (Switzerland) Massimo Busacca

14 April 2010 Round 30	Basel	3–2	St. Gallen	St. Jakob-Park, Basel
19:45	Streller 52' (pen. 1:2); Stocker 58' (2:2); Streller 70' (3:2)	Summary	29' (0:1) Merenda; (yellow card) 36' Lang; 37' (0:2) M. Costanzo; (yellow card) 45' (yellow-red card) 57' Zé Vítor; (yellow card) 52' Imhof; (yellow card) 68' Nushi	Attendance: 20,239; Referee: (Switzerland) Cyril Zimmermann

14 April 2010 Round 31	Basel	5–0	Luzern	St. Jakob-Park, Basel
16:00	da Silva 10' (1:0); Shaqiri 14' (2:0); Stocker 43' (3:0); Stocker 56' (4:0); Carlitos 73' (5:0)	Summary	(yellow card) 37' Wiss; (yellow card) 90' Veškovac	Attendance: 30,571; Referee: (Switzerland) Daniel Wermelinger

25 April 2010 Round 32	Grasshopper	4–0	Basel	Letzigrund, Zürich
16:00	Zuber 3' (1:0); Cabanas 12' (2:0); Smiljanic 29' (pen. 3:0); Toko (yellow card) 49'; Cabanas (yellow card) 65'; Smiljanić (yellow card) 69'; Zárate 81' (4:0)	Summary	(yellow card) 26' Abraham; (red card) 28' Safari; (yellow card) 35' Huggel; (yellow card) 36' Stocker; (yellow card) 66' Shaqiri	Attendance: 12,600; Referee: (Switzerland) Alain Bieri

2 May 2010 Round 33	Basel	4–0	Bellinzona	St. Jakob-Park, Basel
16:00	Streller 10' (1:0); Chipperfield 33' (2:0); Çağdaş (yellow card) 53'; Chipperfield 57' (3:0); Streller 76' (4:0)	Summary	(yellow card) 41' Conti; (yellow card) 43' Feltscher; (yellow card) 79' Diarra	Attendance: 26,257; Referee: (Switzerland) Stephan Studer

5 May 2010 Round 34	Aarau	0–3	Basel	Stadion Brügglifeld, Aarau
20:15	Lampi (yellow card) 36'; Aquaro (yellow card) 38' (yellow-red card) 71'; Burki (yellow card) 46'	Summary	16' (0:1) Chipperfield; (yellow card) 41' Costanzo; (yellow card) 46' Chipperfield; 58' (0:2) Stocker; 90' (0:3) Zoua	Attendance: 6,900; Referee: (Switzerland) Jérôme Laperriere

13 May 2010 Round 35	Basel	3–0	Xamax	St. Jakob-Park, Basel
20:15	Safari (yellow card) 31'; Gelabert 56' (1:0); A. Frei 83' (2:0); A. Frei 86' (3:0)	Summary	(yellow card) 27' Binya; (red card) 45' Varela	Attendance: 30,818; Referee: (Switzerland) Carlo Bertolini

16 May 2010 Round 36	Young Boys	0–2	Basel	Wankdorf, Bern
16:15	Regazzoni (yellow card) 23'; Degen (yellow card) 67'; C. Schneuwly (yellow card) 82'; Wölfli (yellow card) 87'	Summary	(yellow card) 5' da Silva; 39' (0:1) Stocker; 60' (0:2) Chipperfield; (yellow card) 80' Costanzo	Attendance: 31,120 (sold out); Referee: (Switzerland) Jérôme Laperrière

==== League table ====
Pos	Team	Pld	W	D	L	GF	GA	GD	Pts	Qualification or relegation
1	Basel (C)	36	25	5	6	90	46	+44	80	Swiss champions and Swiss Cup winners Qualification to Champions League third qualifying round
2	Young Boys	36	25	2	9	78	47	+31	77	Qualification to Champions League third qualifying round
3	Grasshopper	36	21	2	13	65	43	+22	65	Qualification to Europa League play-off round (Note: Basel, who have already qualified for the 2010–11 UEFA Champions League, played Challenge League side Lausanne-Sport in the 2009–10 Swiss Cup final. Basel have won the cup, thus 3rd-placed team will qualify for the play-off round and the 4th-placed team will be inserted into the third qualifying round of the UEFA Europa League and Lausanne-Sport will be inserted into the 2010–11 UEFA Europa League 2nd qualifying round.)
4	Luzern	36	17	7	12	66	55	+11	58	Qualification to Europa League third qualifying round
5	Sion	36	14	9	13	63	57	+6	51	
6	St. Gallen	36	13	7	16	53	56	−3	46	
7	Zürich	36	12	9	15	55	58	−3	45	
8	Neuchâtel Xamax	36	11	8	17	55	57	−2	41	
9	Bellinzona (O)	36	7	4	25	42	92	−50	25	Advance to relegation play-offs
10	Aarau (R)	36	6	5	25	32	88	−56	23	Relegation to Swiss Challenge League

Source: rsssf
Rules for classification: 1) points; 2) goal difference; 3) number of goals scored.
(C) Champions; (O) Play-off winners; (R) Relegated

=== Swiss Cup ===
For more information, see 2009–10 Swiss Cup

==== Swiss Cup 2009–10 ====
20 September 2009 Round 1	SC Cham	0–3	Basel	Herti Allmend Stadion, Zug
16:00 CEST		Summary	44' (0:1) Almerares; 54' (0:2) Almerares; 76' (0:3) Mustafi	Attendance: 5,210 (sold out); Referee: (Switzerland) Alain Bieri
Note: Fair game, no yellow cards

17 October 2009 Round 2	FC Le Mont	1–3	Basel	Stade Olympique de la Pontaise, Lausanne
17:00	Malgioglio (yellow card) 27'; Guillou (yellow card) 36'; Oezcakmak (yellow card) 50'; R. Rocha (yellow card) 54'; R. Rocha 61' (1:3); Berthaut (yellow card) 74'	Summary	13' (0:1) Aratore; 19' (0:2) Streller; (yellow card) 27' Çağdaş; 39' (0:3) Almerares	Attendance: 1,000; Referee: (Switzerland) Bruno Grossen

20 November 2009 Round 3	Basel	4–2	Zürich	St. Jakob-Park, Basel
20:10	Stocker 17' (1:0); Chipperfield (yellow card) 31'; Frei 53' (2:1); Frei 58' (3:1); Streller 75' (4:1); Çağdaş (yellow card) 86'	Summary	32' (1:1) Djurić; (yellow card) 57' Gajić; (yellow card) 78' Barmettler; 90+2' (4:2) Alphonse	Attendance: 17,749; Referee: (Switzerland) Laperriere

12 December 2009 Quarterfinal	Basel	3–1	FC Biel-Bienne	St. Jakob-Park, Basel
17:45 CET	Cabral (yellow card) 39'; Frei 45' (1:0); Frei 60' (2:0); Streller 69' (3:0)	Summary	(yellow card) 25' Sheholli; 76' (3:1) Hediger	Attendance: 7,503; Referee: (Switzerland) Stephan Studer

5 April 2010 Semifinal	SC Kriens	0–1	Basel	Stadion Kleinfeld, Kriens
13:30 CEST	Fanger (yellow card) 19'; Ferricchio (yellow card) 43'; Imholz (yellow card) 55'; Pacar (yellow card) 90+2'	Summary	17' (0:1) Almerares; (yellow card) 64' Abraham; (yellow card) 88' Carlitos; (yellow card) 90+1' Shaqiri	Attendance: 5,000; Referee: (Switzerland) Daniel Wermelinger

9 May 2010 Final	Basel	6–0	FC Lausanne-Sport	St. Jakob-Park, Basel
16:30 CEST	Stocker 28' (1:0); Shaqiri 30' (2:0); Zoua 46' (3:0); Chipperfield 52' (4:0); Stocker 75' (5:0); Huggel 89' (6:0)	Summary		Attendance: 30,100; Referee: (Switzerland) Sascha Kever
Note: Fair game, no yellow cards

=== UEFA Europa League ===
==== Qualifying rounds ====
===== Second qualifying round =====
16 July 2009 First leg	Basel (Switzerland)	3–0	(Andorra) Santa Coloma	St. Jakob-Park, Basel
19:30	Şahin 23'; Streller 48' (2:0); Almerares 59' (3:0)	UEFA summary FCB summary	(yellow card) 40' Sergio Albanell; (yellow card) 84' dos Santos; (yellow card) 90+2' Sánchez	Attendance: 25,038; Referee: (Wales) Ceri Richards (FAW)

23 July 2009 Second leg	Santa Coloma (Andorra)	1–4	(Switzerland) Basel	Estadi Comunal d'Aixovall, Andorra la Vella
19:00	(yellow card) 36' dos Santos 42' (pen. 1:3)	UEFA summary FCB summary	12' (0:1) Streller; 15' (0:2) Gelabert; (yellow card) 37' Huggel; 40' (o.g. 0:3) Alvarez; (yellow card) 43' Şahin; (yellow card) 52' Gelabert; (yellow card) 86' Safari; 88' (1:4) Almerares	Attendance: 400; Referee: (Bosnia and Herzegovina) Rusmir Mrkovic (FSBiH)

Basel won 7–1 on aggregate.

===== Third qualifying round =====
30 July 2009 First leg	Knattspyrnufélag Reykjavíkur (Iceland)	2–2	(Switzerland) Basel	KR-völlur, Reykjavík
21:15	Benediktsson 6' (1:0); G. Sigurðarson 9' (2:0)	UEFA summary FCB summary	58' (2:1) Chipperfield; 83' (2:2) Almerares	Attendance: 1,500; Referee: (Spain) Fernando Teixeira Vitienes (RFEF)

6 August 2009 Second leg	Basel (Switzerland)	3–1	(Iceland) Knattspyrnufélag Reykjavíkur	St. Jakob-Park, Basel
19:30	Frei 29' (1:0); Shaqiri 77' (2:1); Frei 80' (pen. 3:1)	UEFA summary FCB summary	45+1' (pen. 1:1) Takefusa	Attendance: 13,117; Referee: (Finland) Tony Asumaa (FAF)

Basel won 5–3 on aggregate.

===== Play-off round =====
20 August 2009 First leg	Baku (Azerbaijan)	1–3	(Switzerland) Basel	Tofik Bakhramov Stadium, Baku
17:00	Skulic (yellow card) 3'; Pérez 49' (1:0)	UEFA summary FCB summary	(yellow card) 45' Şahin; (yellow card) 51' Inkoom; 71' (1:1) Streller; 74' (1:2) Streller; 77' (1:3) Huggel	Attendance: 13,000; Referee: Zsolt Szabo (Hungary)
Note: Played in Baku at Tofik Bakhramov Stadium as Karabakh's Guzanli Olympic Stadium did not meet UEFA criteria.

27 August 2009 Second first leg	Basel (Switzerland)	5–1	(Azerbaijan) Baku	St. Jakob-Park, Basel
19:30	Gelabert (yellow card) 7'; Almerares 32' (1:0); Gelabert 36' (2:1) da Silva (yellow card) 61'; Frei 63' (3:1); Huggel (yellow card) 69'; Shaqiri 74' (4:2); Mustafi 84' (5:1); Mustafi (yellow card) 85'; Shaqiri (yellow card) 90'	UEFA summary FCB summary	33' (1:1) Felipe; (yellow card) 85' Fabio Ramim; (yellow card) 85' Jaba	Attendance: 7,113; Referee: Hannes Kaasik (Estonia)

Basel won 8–2 on aggregate.

==== Group stage, group E ====
17 September 2009 Matchday 1	Basel (Switzerland)	2–0	(Italy) Roma	St. Jakob-Park, Basel
19:00	Carlitos 11' (1:0); Cabral (yellow card) 33'; Costanzo (yellow card) 50'; Abraham (yellow card) 64'; Çağdaş (yellow card) 73'; Almerares 87' (2:0); Almerares (yellow card) 88'	UEFA summary FCB summary	(yellow card) 45' Ménez; (yellow card) 78' Pizarro	Attendance: 16,459; Referee: (Spain) Carlos Velasco Carballo (RFEF)

1 October 2009 Matchday 2	Fulham (England)	1–0	(Switzerland) Basel	Craven Cottage, London
21:05	Murphy 57' (1:0); Greening (yellow card) 63'; Baird (yellow card) 85'	UEFA summary FCB summary		Attendance: 16,100; Referee: (Germany) Michael Weiner (DFB)

22 October 2009 Matchday 3	CSKA Sofia (Bulgaria)	0–2	(Switzerland) Basel	Vasil Levski National Stadium, Sofia
21:05	Todorov (yellow card) 67'; Branekov (yellow card) 70'	UEFA summary FCB summary	20' (0:1) Frei; (yellow card) 34' Safari; 63' (0:2) Frei	Attendance: 17,000; Referee: (Portugal) Manuel De Sousa (FPF)
Note: CSKA Sofia played their home group matches at Vasil Levski National Stadium as their Balgarska Armiya Stadium did not meet UEFA criteria.

5 November 2009 Matchday 4	Basel (Switzerland)	3–1	(Bulgaria) CSKA Sofia	St. Jakob-Park, Basel
19:00	Gelabert 35' (1:0); Frei 41' (pen. 2:0); Frei 67' (3:1)	UEFA summary FCB summary	(yellow card) 15' K. Stoyanov; (yellow card) 19' Morozs; 61' (2:1) Yanchev	Attendance: 15,255; Referee: (Ukraine) Oleg Oriekhov (FFU)

3 December 2009 Matchday 5	Roma (Italy)	2–1	(Switzerland) Basel	Stadio Olimpico, Rome
21:05	Totti 32' (pen. 1:1); Ménez (yellow card) 44'; De Rossi (yellow card) 52'; Vučinić 59' (2:1); Juan (yellow card) 90+2'	UEFA summary FCB summary	18' (0:1) Huggel; (yellow card) 31' Gelabert; (yellow card) 75' Carlitos	Attendance: 27,000; Referee: (France) Tony Chapron (FFF)

16 December 2009 Matchday 6	Basel (Switzerland)	2–3	(England) Fulham	St. Jakob-Park, Basel
19:00	Abraham (yellow card) 40'; Frei (yellow card) 45'; Frei 64' (pen. 1:2); Streller 87' (2:3)	UEFA summary FCB summary	(yellow card) 30' Zamora; 41' (0:1) Zamora; 45' (0:2) Zamora; (yellow card) 51' Greening; 77' (1:3) Gera	Attendance: 20,063; Referee: (Sweden) Stefan Johannesson (SvFF)

Pos	Team	Pld	W	D	L	GF	GA	GD	Pts	Qualification
1	(Italy) Roma	6	4	1	1	10	5	+5	13	Advance to knockout phase
2	(England) Fulham	6	3	2	1	8	6	+2	11	Advance to knockout phase
3	(Switzerland) Basel	6	3	0	3	10	7	+3	9	
4	(Bulgaria) CSKA Sofia	6	0	1	5	2	12	−10	1	

Source: Soccerway

== Statistics in the 2009–10 Season ==
=== League Goalscorers/Assists ===
Updated to games played 16 May 2010

League Scorer	Goals
(Switzerland) Marco Streller	21
(Switzerland) Alexander Frei	15
(Australia) Scott Chipperfield	13
(Switzerland) Valentin Stocker	12
(Switzerland) Benjamin Huggel	11
(Switzerland) Xherdan Shaqiri	4
(Argentina) Federico Almerares	3
(Brazil) Antônio da Silva	2
(Argentina) Marcos Gelabert	2
(Cameroon) Jacques Zoua	2
(Portugal) Carlitos	1
(Turkey) Çağdaş Atan	1
(Sweden) Behrang Safari	1
(Switzerland) Cabral	1
Opposition own goals	1
Total goals scored	90

Name	League Assists
(Switzerland) Alexander Frei	10
(Switzerland) Marco Streller	10
(Switzerland) Valentin Stocker	9
(Australia) Scott Chipperfield	8
(Brazil) Antônio da Silva	7
(Portugal) Carlitos	6
(Sweden) Behrang Safari	5
(Switzerland) Xherdan Shaqiri	5
(Switzerland) Benjamin Huggel	4
(Ghana) Samuel Inkoom	4
(Argentina) Federico Almerares	3
(Turkey) Çağdaş Atan	3
(Argentina) David Abraham	2
(Argentina) Marcos Gelabert	1
(Cameroon) Jacques Zoua	1
Total assists made	78

=== Swiss Cup Goalscorers/Assists ===
Updated to games played 9 May 2010

Cup Scorer	Goals
(Argentina) Federico Almerares	4
(Switzerland) Alexander Frei	4
(Switzerland) Marco Streller	3
(Switzerland) Valentin Stocker	3
(Switzerland) Marco Aratore	1
(Switzerland) Orhan Mustafi	1
(Switzerland) Xherdan Shaqiri	1
(Cameroon) Jacques Zoua	1
(Australia) Scott Chipperfield	1
(Switzerland) Benjamin Huggel	1
Total goals scored	20

Name	Cup Assists
(Switzerland) Marco Streller	3
(Australia) Scott Chipperfield	2
(Argentina) Marcos Gelabert	2
(Switzerland) Alexander Frei	2
(Switzerland) Valentin Stocker	1
(Turkey) Serkan Sahin	1
(Argentina) Federico Almerares	1
(Switzerland) Xherdan Shaqiri	1
Total assists made	13

=== European Goalscorers/Assist ===
Updated to games played 16 December 2009

European Scorer	Goals
(Switzerland) Alexander Frei	8
(Switzerland) Marco Streller	6
(Argentina) Federico Almerares	5
(Argentina) Marcos Gelabert	3
(Switzerland) Xherdan Shaqiri	2
(Switzerland) Benjamin Huggel	2
(Portugal) Carlitos	1
(Australia) Scott Chipperfield	1
(Switzerland) Orhan Mustafi	1
(Turkey) Serkan Sahin	1
Total goals scored	30

Name	European Assists
(Switzerland) Alexander Frei	4
(Switzerland) Valentin Stocker	3
(Switzerland) Xherdan Shaqiri	3
(Brazil) Antônio da Silva	3
(Switzerland) Benjamin Huggel	2
(Switzerland) Marco Aratore	2
(Ghana) Samuel Inkoom	1
(Portugal) Carlitos	1
(Switzerland) Marco Streller	1
(Switzerland) Cabral	1
(Sweden) Behrang Safari	1
(Argentina) Federico Almerares	1
(Switzerland) Dominik Ritter	1
(Argentina) Marcos Gelabert	1
Total assists made	25

=== Total Goalscorers/Assists ===
Updated to games played 16 May 2010

All Game Scorer	Goals
(Switzerland) Marco Streller	30
(Switzerland) Alexander Frei	27
(Australia) Scott Chipperfield	15
(Switzerland) Valentin Stocker	15
(Switzerland) Benjamin Huggel	14
(Argentina) Federico Almerares	12
(Switzerland) Xherdan Shaqiri	7
(Argentina) Marcos Gelabert	5
(Cameroon) Jacques Zoua	3
(Brazil) Antônio da Silva	2
(Portugal) Carlitos	2
(Switzerland) Orhan Mustafi	2
(Turkey) Çağdaş Atan	1
(Sweden) Behrang Safari	1
(Switzerland) Cabral	1
(Turkey) Serkan Sahin	1
(Switzerland) Marco Aratore	1
Opposition own goals	1
Total goals scored	140

Name	All Assists
(Switzerland) Alexander Frei	16
(Switzerland) Marco Streller	14
(Switzerland) Valentin Stocker	13
(Australia) Scott Chipperfield	10
(Brazil) Antônio da Silva	10
(Switzerland) Xherdan Shaqiri	9
(Portugal) Carlitos	7
(Sweden) Behrang Safari	6
(Switzerland) Benjamin Huggel	6
(Ghana) Samuel Inkoom	5
(Argentina) Federico Almerares	5
(Argentina) Marcos Gelabert	4
(Turkey) Çağdaş Atan	3
(Argentina) David Abraham	2
(Switzerland) Marco Aratore	2
(Cameroon) Jacques Zoua	1
(Switzerland) Cabral	1
(Switzerland) Dominik Ritter	1
(Turkey) Serkan Sahin	1
Total assists made	116

== Sources ==
- Rotblau: Jahrbuch Saison 2015/2016. Publisher: FC Basel Marketing AG. ISBN 978-3-7245-2050-4
- Rotblau: Jahrbuch Saison 2017/2018. Publisher: FC Basel Marketing AG. ISBN 978-3-7245-2189-1
- Die ersten 125 Jahre / 2018. Publisher: Josef Zindel im Friedrich Reinhardt Verlag, Basel. ISBN 978-3-7245-2305-5
- Season 2009–10 at "Basler Fussballarchiv” homepage
- Switzerland 2009–10 at RSSSF
