= Federico Almerares =

Argentine footballer

Personal information
- Full name: Federico Almerares
- Date of birth: 2 May 1985 (age 41)
- Place of birth: Mar del Plata, Argentina
- Height: 1.83 m (6 ft 0 in)
- Position: Forward

Team information
- Current team: Schaffhausen
- Number: 15

Youth career
- River Plate

Senior career*
| Years | Team | Apps | (Gls) |
| 2003–2008 | River Plate | 13 | (2) |
| 2008–2010 | FC Basel | 41 | (7) |
| 2011 | Neuchâtel Xamax | 16 | (4) |
| 2011–2012 | Belgrano | 20 | (2) |
| 2012–2013 | Atlético Tucumán | 18 | (2) |
| 2013–2014 | Sportivo Belgrano | 6 | (0) |
| 2014 | Mushuc Runa | 4 | (0) |
| 2014 | Macará | | |
| 2014–2015 | Schaffhausen | 25 | (3) |
| 2016 | Club Atlético Alvarado | 8 | (1) |
| 2016–2017 | Ferro Carril Oeste | 30 | (13) |
| 2017–2018 | Deportivo Maipú | 10 | (2) |

International career
| 2005 | Argentina U-20 | 2 | (0) |
- * Club domestic league appearances and goals as of 6 May 2019

Federico Almerares (born 2 May 1985 in Mar del Plata, Buenos Aires Province) is an Argentine former footballer who played as striker or centre forward.

Almerares came through the ranks at Club Atlético River Plate and made his debut in 2003, but never established himself in the first team, only making three appearances between 2005 and March 2008 when he went on trial with Swedish Allsvenskan club Djurgårdens IF. The trial with the Stockholm club was unsuccessful, but he did gather attention from several other European clubs including R.S.C. Anderlecht and FK Austria Wien.

On 8 August 2008, he signed for Swiss side FC Basel. He joined Basel's first team for their 2008–09 season under head coach Christian Gross. In his first season Almerares played mainly for the Basel U-21 team in the Promotion League, in the third tier of Swiss football, but he also played in various test matches for the first team. He played his domestic league debut for the club in the home game in the St. Jakob-Park on 7 March 2009 as Basel won 3–1 against FC Aarau. Almerares was substituted in the 62nd minute for Orhan Mustafi. At the end of the 2008–09 Super League season Basel were third in the table, seven points behind new champions Zürich and one adrift of runners-up Young Boys. In the 2008–09 Swiss Cup Basel advanced via Schötz, Bulle, Thun and Zurich to the semi-finals. But here they were stopped by Young Boys. After a goalless 90 minutes and extra time YB decided the penalty shoot-out 3–2 and advanced to the final to become runners-up, as Sion became cup winners.

For their 2009–10 season Basel appointed Thorsten Fink as their new head coach. Almerares advanced to becoming a regular player, often as joker. Basel joined the 2009–10 UEFA Europa League in the second qualifying round and were matched against Andorran club Santa Coloma. Almerares played in both matches and scored in both. Basel advanced to the group stage and were drawn in the group with Roma, Fulham and CSKA Sofia. In the first round in the home game in the St. Jakob-Park on 17 September 2009 Almerares scored the winning goal in Basel's impressive 2–0 win over Roma. In the group stage, despite winning three of the six games, they ended in third position and were eliminated. They finished four points behind group winners Roma and one behind Fulham, against whom they lost 3–2 in the last game of the stage. Almerares scored his first domestic league goal for the team in the home game in the St. Jakob-Park on 1 April 2010. In fact the scored twice as Basel won 4–3 against Sion. At the end of the 2009–10 season he won the Double with his club. They won the League Championship title with 3 points advantage over second placed Young Boys. The team won the Swiss Cup, winning the final 6–0 against Lausanne-Sport.

Basel started in the 2010–11 UEFA Champions League third qualifying round and advanced to the group stage, but ended the group in third position. Therefore, they dropped to the 2010–11 Europa League knockout phase, but here they were eliminated by Spartak Moscow due to a last minute goal against them. Almerares played in seven of the 10 Champions League matches. In the 18 league matches until the winter break, Almerares had 14 appearances, 11 of which as substitute. But since he was only number three striker behind Alexander Frei and Marco Streller, the club allowed a transfer. Basel won the Swiss Championship at the end of the 2010–11 season, topping the table just one point clear of rivals Zürich. During his time with the first team, Almerares played a total of 123 games for Basel scoring a total of 78 goals. 41 of these games were in the Swiss Super League, eight in the Swiss Cup, 17 in the UEFA competitions (Champions League and Europa League) and 57 were friendly games. He scored seven goals in the domestic league, seven in the cup, six in the European games and the other 58 were scored during the test games.

On 21 January 2011 Almerares transferred within Switzerland to Neuchâtel Xamax. Until the end of the season, he played 16 games, scoring four goals, for the Xamax, but after the second game in the 2011/12 season he was fired for lack of efficiency.

Almerares returned to Argentina as he transferred to Club Atlético Belgrano in July 2011. He made his debut for Belgrano on 17 August 2011 in the 1:1 home draw against Club Olimpo and scored his first goal for the club on 1 October in the 1:2 home defeat against Argentinos Juniors.

== Honours ==
Basel

- Swiss Super League: 2009–10
- Swiss Cup: 2009–10

== Sources ==
- Rotblau: Jahrbuch Saison 2017/2018. Publisher: FC Basel Marketing AG. ISBN 978-3-7245-2189-1
- Die ersten 125 Jahre. Publisher: Josef Zindel im Friedrich Reinhardt Verlag, Basel. ISBN 978-3-7245-2305-5
- Verein "Basler Fussballarchiv" Homepage
