= Oliver Klaus =

Swiss footballer (born 1990)

Personal information
- Full name: Oliver Klaus
- Date of birth: 4 May 1990 (age 36)
- Place of birth: Basel, Switzerland
- Height: 1.85 m (6 ft 1 in)
- Position: Goalkeeper

Youth career
- –2002: FC Gelterkinden
- 2002–2009: FC Basel

Senior career*
Years	Team	Apps	(Gls)
2007–2010	Basel U-21	34	(0)
2009–2010	Basel	0	(0)
2010–2011	Yverdon Sport	15	(0)
2011–2016	FC Vaduz	39	(0)
2016–2017	Old Boys	22	(0)
2017–2020	FC Balzers		
2020–2021	Vaduz III		
2022	FC Balzers		
2022–2023	Vaduz III		

International career
2005–2006	Switzerland U-16	5	(0)
2006–2007	Switzerland U-17	6	(0)
2007–2008	Switzerland U-18	4	(0)
2008–2009	Switzerland U-19	12	(0)
2009–2010	Switzerland U-20	3	(0)
2010	Switzerland U-21	0	(0)
- * Club domestic league appearances and goals

Oliver Klaus (born 4 May 1990) is a Swiss former footballer who played as goalkeeper from the late 2000s up until the 2020s. He was Swiss youth international footballer. Since October 2022 he is the sporting director of USV Eschen/Mauren.

== Career ==
=== Club ===
Youth

Klaus started his youth football locally in Gelterkinden and then he moved to the youth department of FC Basel, progressing regularly through the ranks, becoming Swiss champions in various stages. He played in the Swiss championship at U-16 level in the 2005–06 season, winning the championship with a 3–0 win in the final against the U-16 team from FC Winterthur. In the 2006–07 championship season, the team repeated the success by winning the final 5–0 against Servette U-16. Before the 2007–08 season, he advanced to their U-18 team, who ended the league season in third position, but were able to win the cup at U-18 level. In the final held on 15 June 2008 in the Gurzelen football stadium in Biel/Bienne, the Basler juniors were a goal behind. But then, Marco Aratore scored the equaliser in the 68th minute and five minutes later the same player netted the winning goal, as Basel won 2–1 against the U-18 from Team-Luzern-Kriens.

Basel

In advance of their 2009–10 season Klaus advanced to Basel's first team, under new head coach Thorsten Fink, as third goalkeeper and, after first choice goalkeeper Franco Costanzo was injured, moved up to become their second goalkeeper. However, he was not never used in the first team during this time. At the end of the season he won the Double with his club. They won the League Championship title with 3 points advantage over second placed Young Boys. In the 2009–10 Swiss Cup the team advanced to the final, and winning this 6–0 against Lausanne-Sport they lifted the trophy.

Yverdon

Upon his personal request, Basel released Klaus from his contract, and he moved on a free transfer to Yverdon Sport to play in the 2010–11 Challenge League. He made his debut on matchday 1, on 23 July 2010, in the away defeat against SC Kriens. With one exception, he played the entire first half of the Challenge League, but in the second half of the season, Klaus was replaced by the club's new signing Anthony Basso. The team ended the season in last position and suffered relegation.

Vaduz

In summer 2011, Klaus signed with FC Vaduz and became the team's reserve goalkeeper behind Peter Jehle. Klaus played his team debut in the away game in the 2011–12 Liechtenstein Cup on 18 October as Vaduz won 17–0 against the reserve team of FC Triesen. This was the only game that Klaus played in that season. During September of the 2012–13 Challenge League season first choice keeper Jehle suffered a torn muscle bundle and Klaus took over. That season Klaus had 29 league and cup appearances. In the 2012–13 Liechtenstein Cup final held on 1 May 2013 in the Rheinpark Stadion the match against FC Balzers ended with a 1–1 draw. In the penalty shoot-out Klaus held all three spot-kicks and Vaduz lifted the trophy. At the end of the 2013–14 Challenge League season the team were division champions, achieving promotion and they successfully defended the cup title. Klaus stayed with the club until summer 2016. On 14 April the club announced that they were not going to extend their contract. During his time with Vaduz the team won the Liechtensteiner Cup four times.

Old Boys

On 5 August 2016 it was announced that Klaus had signed a one-year contract with BSC Old Boys, who at that time played in the Promotion League. At the end of the season the team were on the twelfth position in the league table, seven points above the relegation zone. Klaus played in 22 of the team's 30 games.

End of career

After this one-year Klaus moved back to Liechtenstein, this time to FC Balzers, who played in the fourth tier. At the end of 2019, he ended his career as professional footballer for other professional reasons. Klaus continued to play amateur football, now as a striker, for the 3rd team of FC Vaduz, which achieved promotion to the 4.Liga (8th tier of Swiss football) in 2021/22. Klaus was very successful in his new playing position; in just eight games he scored 14 goals. In the second half of the 2021/22 season, he made another comeback as goalkeeper with FC Balzers, because their goalie Thomas Hobi was injured.

=== International career ===
Klaus played for various Swiss youth teams, playing five games for the Swiss U-16 team, six for the U-17 and four games for the U-18. He has also played twelve games for the Switzerland U-19 team and three for the U-20, making his debut here on 12 August 2009 in the 5–1 victory against the Austrian U-20 team. He was later called up for the U-21, but never played a match, because the other goalkeepers at this time included his former FC Basel youth teammates Yann Sommer and Benjamin Siegrist.

=== Post-playing career ===
In October 2022 he became the sporting director of the fourth tier club USV Eschen-Mauren.

== Private life ==
In April 2022 Klaus opened his first café under the name "Jenoli" and a few months later, in August, he opened the first Asian take away restaurant with the same name. The company name "Jenoli" stands for Jennifer (his wife) and Oliver.

== Titles and honours ==
Basel

- Swiss champion at U-16 level: 2005–06, 2006–07
- Swiss Cup winner at U-18 level: 2007–08
- Swiss Super League champion: 2010
- Swiss Cup winner: 2009–10

Vaduz

- Swiss Challenge League: 2013–14
- Liechtensteiner Cup: 2012–13, 2013–14, 2014–15, 2015–16

== Sources ==
- Josef Zindel (2018). FC Basel 1893. Die ersten 125 Jahre (in German). Basel: Friedrich Reinhardt Verlag. ISBN 978-3-7245-2305-5.
