= Cabral (footballer) =

Footballer (born 1988)

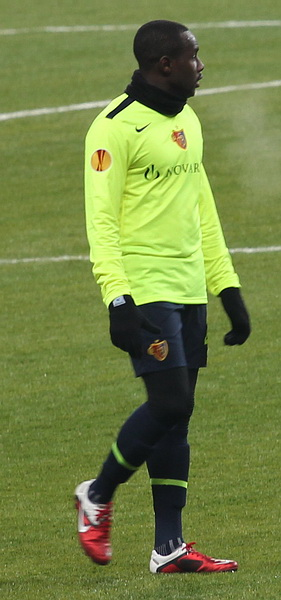
- Cabral playing for Basel in 2011

Personal information
- Full name: Adilson Tavares Varela
- Date of birth: 22 October 1988 (age 38)
- Place of birth: Praia, Cape Verde
- Height: 1.78 m (5 ft 10 in)
- Position: Defensive midfielder

Youth career
- 1997–1998: Moudon
- 1998–2001: Etoile Broye
- 2001–2005: Lausanne

Senior career*
Years	Team	Apps	(Gls)
2005–2007	Lausanne	26	(0)
2007–2013	Basel	99	(2)
2008–2009	→ Sevilla Atlético (loan)	23	(1)
2013–2015	Sunderland	1	(0)
2014	→ Genoa (loan)	7	(0)
2015–2016	Zürich	15	(0)
2017	Le Mont	12	(0)
2018–2020	Lausanne-Sport	15	(0)

International career^{‡}
2005–2006	Switzerland U18	5	(1)
2006–2007	Switzerland U19	14	(0)
2007–2008	Switzerland U20	2	(0)
2007–2009	Switzerland U21	9	(0)
- * Club domestic league appearances and goals as of 1 December 2016 ‡ National team caps and goals as of 31 December 2010, 24:00 (UTC)

Adilson Tavares Varela (born 22 October 1988), commonly known as Cabral, is a former professional footballer.

He spent most of his career at Basel, winning ten honours including five Swiss Super League championships and three Swiss Cup titles. He also had brief spells in three foreign countries.

After representing his adopted Switzerland 30 times between under-18 and under-21 level, Cabral was called up in 2012 for his native Cape Verde but did not play.

== Club career ==
=== Youth football ===
Cabral started his children's football with local amateur club Moudon. He moved to Étoile-Broye in 1998 and stayed with them three seasons. In 2000, he was spotted by Lausanne and in summer 2001 he joined their youth department.

=== Lausanne-Sport ===
Cabral then advanced through the ranks by Lausanne-Sport playing the 2004–05 with their U-21 team. In the 2005–06 season he advanced to their first team, who at that time played in the Challenge League, the second tier of Swiss football. He made his debut for the club in August 2005 under head coach Gérard Castella, coming on as a substitute in the match against Baden. He had only three appearances that season, but was regularly on the pitch the following season. He went on to play 26 league games for Lausanne-Sport.

=== Basel ===
In summer 2007, Cabral left Lausanne for Basel on a free transfer, signing a three-year deal. He joined Basel's first team for their 2007–08 season under head coach Christian Gross, who was starting his ninth season in that position. After playing in six test games Cabral played his domestic league debut for the club in the away game in the Stadion Wankdorf on 5 August 2007 as Basel suffered a 1–5 against Zürich. At the end of the 2007–08 season he won the Double with the club. They won the League Championship title with four points advantage over second placed Young Boys. In the Swiss Cup via Léchelles, Binningen, Grasshopper Club, Stade Nyonnais and in the semi-final Thun, Basel advanced to the final, and winning this 4–1 against AC Bellinzona they won the competition.

==== Sevilla (loan) ====
However, during his first season with the team he played in only eight league matches and had two appearances in the 2007–08 Swiss Cup. Therefore, for the 2008–09 season, he was loaned out to Sevilla's B Team, Sevilla Atlético, who played in the Segunda Federación, the fourth tier of Spanish football. Here he made 22 league appearances, scoring one goal.

==== Return to Basel ====
When he returned to Basel Manager Christian Gross had been sacked and Thorsten Fink was in charge. Cabral had become a much improved player following his season in Spain and thus during the 2009–10 season he broke into the first team squad. Basel joined the 2009–10 UEFA Europa League in the second qualifying round. Basel advanced to the group stage, in which despite winning three of the six games the ended in third position and were eliminated. They finished four points behind group winners Roma and one behind Fulham, against whom they lost 3–2 in the last game of the stage. Cabral played in eight of the ten matches.

He scored his first league goal for his club in the home game in the St. Jakob-Park on 6 December 2009. Basel were 1–2 down at half time, Cabral scored the equaliser in the 54th minute and the team went on to achieve a 3–2 win over Bellinzona. At the end of the 2009–10 season, he won the Double with his club. They won the League Championship title with 3 points advantage over second placed Young Boys. In the Swiss Cup via Cham, Le Mont, Zürich, Biel-Bienne and in the semi-final Kriens, Basel advanced to the final, and winning 6–0 against Lausanne, they won the competition. Cabral played in three of the six cup games, but not in the final.

Basel started in the 2010–11 UEFA Champions League third qualifying round and advanced to the group stage. Cabral's finest goal came in the group stage away game against Roma on 19 October 2010. Cabral was substituted on for Marco Streller during the 81st minute. In the third minute of overtime, Cabral dribbled around the defence and then lobbed the ball over keeper Bogdan Lobonţ to the final score of 3–1. However, Basel only gained six points during the stage and thus ended the group in third position. Therefore, they dropped to the 2010–11 Europa League knockout phase, but here they were eliminated by Spartak Moscow due to a last-minute goal against them. Cabral played in eight of the 12 European matches. Cabral won his third Championship medal with the club at the end of the 2010–11 season, topping the table just one point clear of rivals Zürich.

To the beginning of their 2011–12 season Cabral was member of the Basel team that won the 2011 Uhrencup, beating both Hertha Berlin 3–0 and West Ham United 2–1 to lead the table on goal difference above Young Boys. In the home game in the St. Jakob-Park on 6 August 2011 Cabral scored one of his rare goals. He came on as substitute in the 75th minute as Basel were trailing 2–3 against Sion. Then in the third minute of overtime, his low drive from 25 meters out, found its way under Andris Vaņins diving body and salvaged the team a point with the three all draw. At the end of the 2011–12 season Cabral won his third Double with the club. They won the League Championship title with 20 points advantage. In the Swiss Cup Basel advanced to the final, beating Eschenbach, Schötz, Wil, Lausanne and in the semi-final Winterthur. In the final, they played against Luzern and the game ended 1–1 after extra time. Basel won the cup by beating their opponents 4–3 in the penalty shootout.

After his teammate Benjamin Huggel retired from professional football in May 2012, Cabral took his place in central midfield and advanced to become one of the team leaders. Basel had started in the 2012–13 UEFA Champions League in the qualifying rounds. But were knocked out of the competition by CFR Cluj in the play-off round. They then continued in the 2012–13 UEFA Europa League group stage. Ending the group in second position, Basel continued in the knockout phase and advanced as far as the semi-finals, there being matched against the reigning UEFA Champions League holders Chelsea. Chelsea won both games advancing 5–2 on aggregate, eventually winning the competition outright. Cabral played in 15 of the team's 20 European matches.

At the end of the Swiss Super League season 2012–13 he won his fifth Championship title with the team, ending the season three points above their nearest rivals. In the 2012–13 Swiss Cup Basel advanced to the final via five away games, winning against amateurs Amriswil, lower tier Chiasso and Locarno, Thun in the quarter-final and Sion in the semi-final. The final was held in the Stadion Wankdorf, but Basel became runners up behind Grasshoppers, being defeated 4–3 on penalties, following a 1–1 draw after extra time.

At this point, he decided to move on. During his time with the club, Cabral played a total of 252 games for Basel scoring a total of six goals. 99 of these games were in the Swiss Super League, 14 in the Swiss Cup, 40 in the UEFA competitions (Champions League, UEFA Cup and Europa League) and 99 were friendly games. He scored two goals in the domestic league, one in the Champions League and the other three were scored during the test games.

=== Sunderland ===
On 10 June 2013, Sunderland announced the signing of Cabral on a free transfer. He scored his first goal for the club against Tottenham Hotspur in the semi-final of the 2013 Premier League Asia Trophy. Sunderland would eventually win that game 3–1. He made his competitive debut for the club on the opening day of the season in a 1–0 home defeat against Fulham on 17 August 2013. However, he failed to make another league appearance all season, even after Paolo Di Canio was sacked as manager and replaced with Gus Poyet.

==== Genoa (loan) ====
On 9 January 2014, having played no further part for the Black Cats, he was loaned to Genoa until the end of the season.

==== Return to Sunderland ====
After the loan period, Cabral returned to Sunderland but could not get a place in the team. He had three appearances for their U-21 team. On 2 February 2015, Sunderland confirmed that Cabral had left the club by mutual consent.

=== Zürich ===
On 30 May 2015 he signed a four-year deal with Zürich. Cabral made a decent debut in the Zurich jersey, on 21 June 2015, and distributed the balls well in midfield. In the end, his new team beat Aarau 3-0 in the friendly match. On 1 December 2016, the contract was terminated by mutual consent. Cabral made 15 league appearances for FC Zürich.

=== Le Mont ===
In February 2017 Cabral joined Le Mont-sur-Lausanne, who at that time played in the Challenge League, the second tier of Swiss football. He immediately came to regular appearances. However, few days later the Swiss Football Association did not award the club a license for the following season. Because the club did not file an appeal, the club was forcibly relegated at the end of the season. Cabral left them as a free agent.

=== Lausanne-Sport ===
On 5 March 2018 it was announced that Cabral had re-joined Lausanne. On 1 July 2020 he retired from football.

== International career ==
Cabral represented Switzerland at Under-18, Under-19, Under-20 and Under-21 levels.

In November 2012, Cabral switched his sporting nationality to his birth country of Cape Verde, being called up for the friendly match between the Cape Verde national senior team against Ghana. In that match, which Cape Verde lost 0–1, he was on the bench but did not play.

== Personal life ==
Cabral is a cousin of fellow footballers Manuel Fernandes, Gelson Fernandes and Edimilson Fernandes.

In 2016, Cabral was found not guilty at Kingston upon Hull Crown Court after a woman had accused him of rape from his time at Sunderland. The woman had consensual sex with several footballers and the judge called her claim a "weak case". Cabral stated: "I was really angry for my family, for my friends, for this because everybody think 'You rape girls', 'You are a rapist'. Now the real story goes out. I am not guilty."

== Honours ==
Basel

- Swiss Super League: 2007–08, 2010, 2010–11, 2011–12, 2012–13
- Swiss Cup: 2007–08, 2009–10, 2011–12

Zürich

- Swiss Cup: 2015–16

== Sources ==
- Rotblau: Jahrbuch Saison 2017/2018. Publisher: FC Basel Marketing AG. ISBN 978-3-7245-2189-1
- Die ersten 125 Jahre. Publisher: Josef Zindel im Friedrich Reinhardt Verlag, Basel. ISBN 978-3-7245-2305-5
- Verein "Basler Fussballarchiv" Homepage
