= David Hasler =

Liechtensteiner footballer (born 1990)

Personal information
- Date of birth: 4 May 1990 (age 36)
- Place of birth: Schaan, Liechtenstein
- Height: 1.73 m (5 ft 8 in)
- Positions: Attacking midfielder; striker

Youth career
- –2007: USV Eschen/Mauren
- 2007–2009: Basel

Senior career*
Years	Team	Apps	(Gls)
2009–2010	Basel U-21	33	(14)
2010–2013	Vaduz	66	(16)
2013–2015	USV Eschen/Mauren	13	(9)
Total		112	(39)

International career
2006–2012	Liechtenstein U21	9	(2)
2008–2014	Liechtenstein	28	(1)
- * Club domestic league appearances and goals

David Hasler (born 4 May 1990) is a Liechtensteiner former professional footballer who played as an attacking midfielder or striker in the late 2000s and early 2010s.

== Career ==
=== Club ===
Youth football

Hasler played his youth football with local amateur team USV Eschen/Mauren. He played his U-15 and U-16 football with Team-Liechtenstein.

Hasler signed a youth contract with Swiss club FC Basel in 2007, despite the fact that FC Zürich and BSC Young Boys also competed for his signature. As UEFA.com confirmed the signing, they named him as one of the most promising youngsters of 2007. For the 2007–08 season, Hasler joined Basel's U-18 team, they ended the league season in third position, but were able to win the cup at U-18 level. In the final held on 15 June 2008 in the Gurzelen football stadium in Biel/Bienne, the Basler juniors were a goal behind. But then, Marco Aratore scored the equaliser in the 68th minute and five minutes later the same player netted the winning goal, as Basel won 2–1 against the U-18 from Team-Luzern-Kriens.

During the winter break of the 2008–09 season Hasler was brought up to Basel's U-21 team, who played in the 1. Liga, which was the forerunner to the Promotion League the third tier of Swiss football. He played in 12 matches with them, eight in the starting formation and four as substitute, and in these twelve matches he scored six goals. That season the team became division champions and won the championship at U-21 level. In the following season Hasler played 21 of the 30 games, scoring eight times, the team became runners-up in the division. After playing for Basel's youth and U-21 teams, Hasler then moved to Vaduz on a free transfer in the summer of 2010.

Vaduz

Hasler played three seasons for Vaduz, who at that time played in the Swiss Challenge League. In the 2010–11 league season he had 19 appearances, scoring nine goals. In April he suffered a meniscus injury and missed over three months. The team won the 2010–11 Liechtenstein Cup, but Hasler missed the final due to his injury. In the 2011–12 league season he had 21 appearances, scoring five goals. In the cup they reached the final but lost this in the penalty shoot-out. In the 2012–13 league season he had 26 appearances, scoring three times. The team won the cup, but Hasler again missed the final due to an injury.

USV

Hasler joined his former club USV Eschen/Mauren in the summer of 2013. But, following a string of injuries, he announced his retirement from active football on 8 April 2014 and from then he played in the USV second or third teams in the lower leagues.

=== International ===
He made his international debut for the Liechtenstein U21 national team in April 2006 against Northern Ireland at 15 years and 11 months old. On 26 March 2008, Hasler was granted his first senior cap for the Liechtenstein national team against Malta.

=== Career statistics ===
Score and result list Liechtenstein's goal tally first, score column indicates score after Hasler goal.

International goal scored by David Hasler
No.	Date	Venue	Opponent	Score	Result	Competition
1	14 August 2012	Rheinpark Stadion, Vaduz, Liechtenstein	Andorra	1–0	1–0	Friendly

== Titles and honours ==
Basel

- Swiss Cup winner at U-18 level: 2007–08
- Swiss championship at U-21 level: 2008–09

Vaduz

Liechtenstein Football Cup: 2010–11, 2012–13

Individual

Liechtensteiner Young Player of the Year: 2010

== Sources ==
- Josef Zindel (2018). FC Basel 1893. Die ersten 125 Jahre (in German). Basel: Friedrich Reinhardt Verlag. ISBN 978-3-7245-2305-5.
