= Daniel Unal =

Swiss footballer of Assyrian origin (born 1990)

Personal information
- Date of birth: 18 January 1990 (age 36)
- Place of birth: Locarno, Switzerland
- Height: 1.75 m (5 ft 9 in)
- Position: Attacking midfielder

Youth career
- –2005: FC Locarno
- 2005–2006: Bellinzona

Senior career*
Years	Team	Apps	(Gls)
2006–2007	Bellinzona	17	(1)
2007–2008	→ Roma B (loan)	27	(4)
2008–2011	FC Basel U21	45	(8)
2008–2011	FC Basel	6	(0)
2011–2013	FC Locarno	12	(0)

International career
2006–2007	Switzerland U-16	2	(0)
2006–2007	Switzerland U-17	11	(3)
2007	Switzerland U-18	1	(0)
2007–2009	Switzerland U-19	15	(5)
2009–2011	Switzerland U-20	8	(2)
- * Club domestic league appearances and goals

Daniel Unal (born 18 January 1990) is a Swiss former footballer who played as a midfielder.

== Club career ==
Unal played his youth football with FC Locarno and in 2005 he moved to AC Bellinzona. In 2006 he advanced to their first team, who at that time played in the Challenge League, the second tier of Swiss football. With them he made seventeen appearances, scoring one goal, in his first and only season with the team. He was loaned to the U21-Team of A.S. Roma for the 2007/08 season and was set to sign on a permanent contract, as Bellinzona and Roma had a deal for players exchanges, but, instead he signed for FC Basel.

On 8 July 2008 Unal signed a two-year contract with an option for a third year. In his first season with Basel, he played exclusively in the FC Basel U-21 team, having 20 appearances and scoring three goals. However he played in five test matches in the first few months of 2009, coming on each time as substitute. Unal joined Basel's first team in advance of their 2009–10 season under new head coach Thorsten Fink. After playing in seven further test games Unal played his debut with the team on 17 September 2009 in the 2009–10 UEFA Europa League group stage, also coming on as substitute, as Basel won 2–0 against A.S. Roma. Three days later, he played his Swiss Cup debut for the club in the away game on 20 September as Basel won 3–0 against SC Cham. He played the full 90 minutes. He played his domestic league debut for the club in the home game in the St. Jakob-Park on 23 September as Basel won 4–0 against St. Gallen, again coming on as substitute.

At the end of the 2009–10 season he won the Double with his club. They won the League Championship title with 3 points advantage over second placed Young Boys. The team won the Swiss Cup, winning the final 6–0 against Lausanne-Sport. Unal had appeared in three of the cup games. Again this season he played mainly in the Basel U-21 team.

In the following season Unal played in two cup and four league matches, again playing mainly with the U-21 team. With Basel, Unal won his second Swiss Championship at the end of the 2010–11 season, topping the table just one point clear of rivals Zürich. Basel and Unal agreed not to extent their contract.

During the time with the club's first team, Unal played a total of 51 games for Basel scoring seven goals. Six of these games were in the Swiss Super League, five in the Swiss Cup, one in the UEFA Europa League and 39 were friendly games. He scored all seven goals during the test games.

During his time with Basel, Unal attracted the interests of FC Twente, but it never came to a deal. During summer 2011 he returned home and signed a two year team with his club of origin FC Locarno. In his first season he had diverse appearances, but he was handicapped through injuries. In summer 2013 he was again without club and he retired from professional football.

== International ==
Unal played two years for the Switzerland U-19 team. With the team he played in the 2008 UEFA European Under-19 Championship qualification. In the game on 10 October 2007 he scored two goals as the Swiss won 6–1 against Kazakhstan U-19. He also played in the 2009 UEFA European Under-19 Championship elite qualification with the team. In the match on 7 June 2009 he scored a goal as the Swiss won 6–1 against Republic of Ireland U-19.

He was also a Switzerland under-20s international player.

== Honours ==
Basel

- Swiss Super League: 2010, 2011
- Swiss Cup: 2010

== Sources ==
- Die ersten 125 Jahre. Publisher: Josef Zindel im Friedrich Reinhardt Verlag, Basel. ISBN 978-3-7245-2305-5
- Verein "Basler Fussballarchiv" Homepage
