= Antônio da Silva (footballer) =

Brazilian footballer (born 1978)

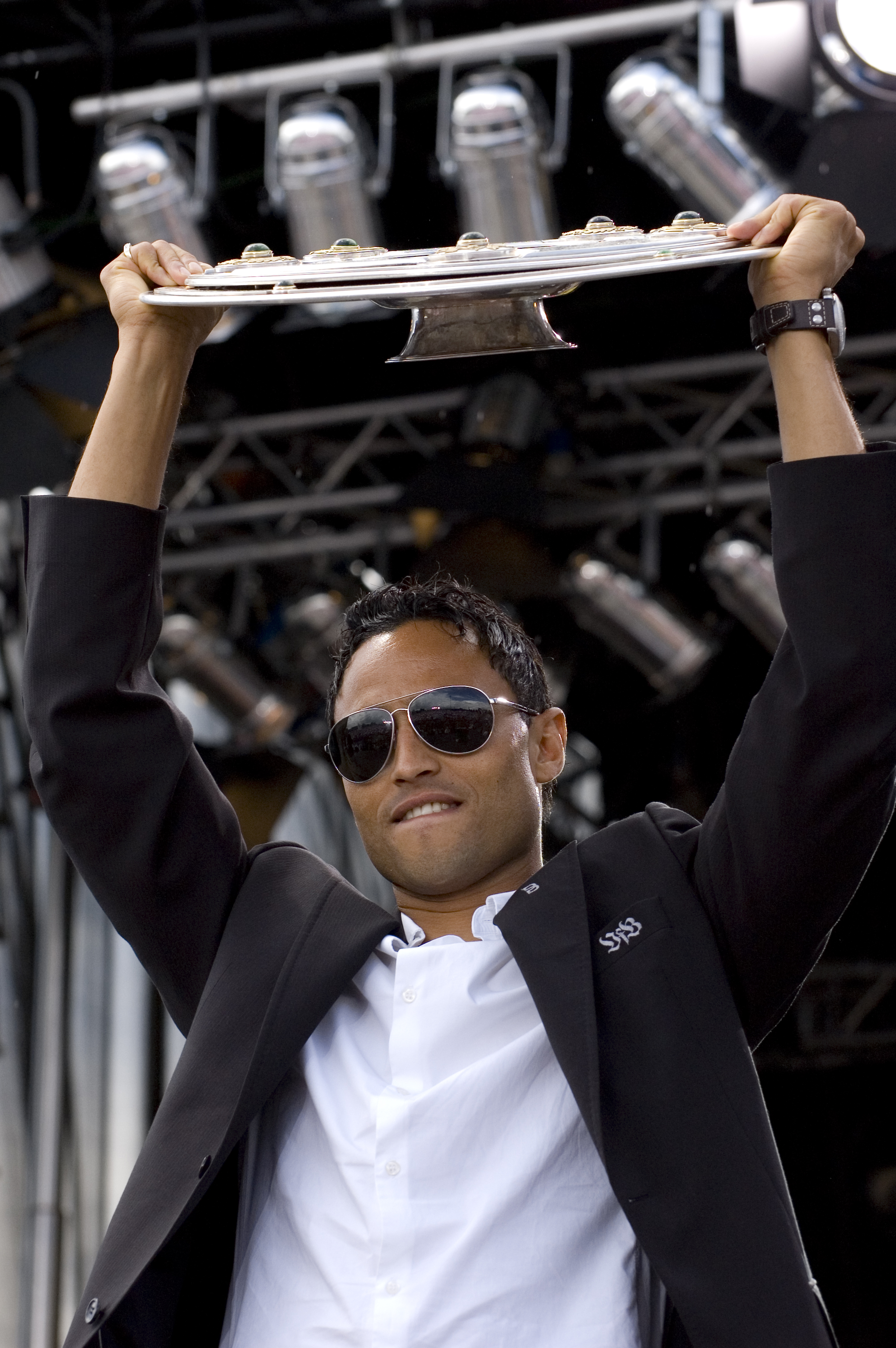
- Da Silva in 2007

Personal information
- Full name: Antônio da Silva
- Date of birth: 13 June 1978 (age 48)
- Place of birth: Rio de Janeiro, Brazil
- Height: 1.75 m (5 ft 9 in)
- Position: Midfielder

Youth career
- 1992: Flamengo
- 1992–1994: Eintracht Trier
- 1994–1995: Flamengo
- 1995–1997: Sportfreunde Eisbachtal

Senior career*
Years	Team	Apps	(Gls)
1997–1999	Eintracht Frankfurt	0	(0)
1999–2003	SV Wehen	86	(22)
2003–2004	Mainz 05 II	1	(0)
2003–2006	Mainz 05	90	(13)
2006–2008	VfB Stuttgart	48	(3)
2008–2010	Karlsruher SC	28	(2)
2009–2010	→ Basel (loan)	25	(2)
2010–2012	Borussia Dortmund	27	(1)
2012–2013	MSV Duisburg	10	(0)
Total		315	(43)
Medal record
VfB Stuttgart
Winner	Bundesliga	2007
FC Basel
Winner	Swiss Super League	2010
Winner	Swiss Cup	2010
Borussia Dortmund
Winner	Bundesliga	2011
Winner	Bundesliga	2012
Winner	DFB-Pokal	2012
- * Club domestic league appearances and goals

Antônio da Silva (born 13 June 1978) is a Brazilian former professional footballer who played as a midfielder.

== Career ==
Da Silva began his professional career with Eintracht Frankfurt in 1997, but did not play any league matches. In 1999, he moved to SV Wehen of Regionalliga Süd. Four years later, he joined 1. FSV Mainz 05 where he completed 90 domestic league matches, before being transferred to VfB Stuttgart in 2006. He won the Bundesliga during his time there, in the 2006–07 season. He then moved to Karlsruher SC but was put on loan to Swiss side FC Basel after just one season.

On 26 June 2009 it was announced that da Silva had signed a contract over a one-year loan to Basel, with an option of a definitive takeover. It was hoped that he could be the replacement for Basel's play-maker Ivan Ergic, who had just retired from his active football career. He joined Basel's first team during their 2009–10 season under head coach Thorsten Fink. After playing in three test games, da Silva played his domestic league debut for the club in the away game in the Kybunpark on 12 July 2009 as Basel suffered a 0–2 defeat against St. Gallen. In a test match on 13 October against an amateur selection from Sissach-Gelterkinden, da Silva scored a hat-trick within 17 minutes. He scored his first league goal for the club in the away game again in the Kybunpark against St. Gallen as Basel won the game 4–2 on 21 March 2010.

At the end of the 2009–10 season he won the Double with the club. They won the League Championship title with 3 points advantage over second placed Young Boys. The team won the Swiss Cup, winning the final 6–0 against Lausanne-Sport. Da Silva played the full 90 minutes. The club did not take their contracted option and da Silva left the club. During the season with the club, da Silva played a total of 45 games for Basel scoring a total of five goals. 25 of these games were in the Swiss Super League, three in the Swiss Cup, eight in the Europa League and nine were friendly games. He scored two goals in the domestic league and the afore mentioned hattrick in the test game.

For the 2010–11 season, he returned to the Bundesliga by signing a one-year contract with Borussia Dortmund. On 21 April 2011, he signed a new one-year contract with Borussia. He left the club at the end of the 2011–12 season.

== Honours ==
VfB Stuttgart

- Bundesliga: 2006–07

Basel

- Swiss Super League: 2009–10
- Swiss Cup: 2009–10

Borussia Dortmund

- Bundesliga: 2010–11, 2011–12
- DFB-Pokal : 2011–12
