= Marco Wölfli =

Swiss footballer (born 1982)

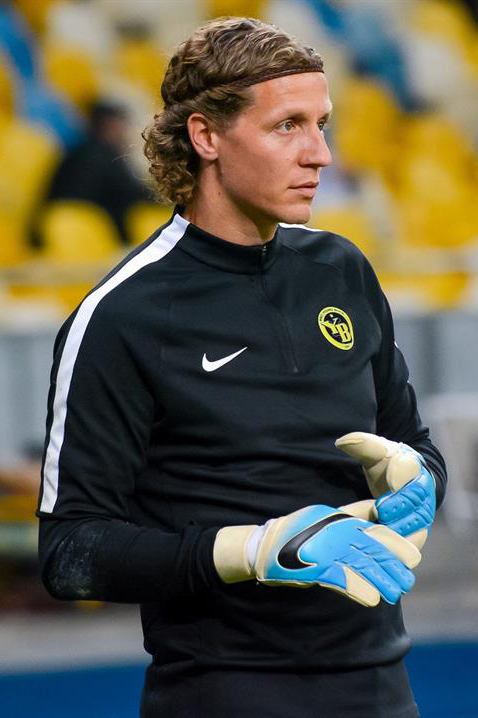
- Wölfli playing for Young Boys in 2017

Personal information
- Full name: Marco Wölfli
- Date of birth: 22 August 1982 (age 44)
- Place of birth: Grenchen, Switzerland
- Height: 1.86 m (6 ft 1 in)
- Position: Goalkeeper

Youth career
- 1991–1997: Fulgor Grenchen
- 1997–1998: FC Solothurn
- 1998–1999: Young Boys

Senior career*
Years	Team	Apps	(Gls)
1999–2020	Young Boys	490	(0)
2002–2003	→ Thun (loan)	11	(0)
Total		501	(0)

International career
2001–2004	Switzerland U-21	25	(0)
2008–2013	Switzerland	11	(0)
- * Club domestic league appearances and goals

Marco Wölfli (born 22 August 1982) is a Swiss former professional football goalkeeper who played for Young Boys in the Swiss Super League.

== Club career ==
Wölfli made his league debut for Young Boys during their 1999–2000 Nationalliga B campaign. Two years later, limited opportunities with the first team saw him move to FC Thun, where he won promotion to the Nationalliga A and established himself as a good prospect. He returned to Young Boys in the summer of 2003, quickly cementing himself as the Bern club's first choice goalkeeper.

After the retirement of veteran striker Thomas Häberli, Wölfli was named club captain by manager Vladimir Petkovic prior to the 2009–10 season. He is currently the longest tenured player at the club. In November 2010 he extended his contract to last until 30 June 2015.

He was part of the Young Boys squad that won the Swiss Super League for the first time in 32 years in 2017–18 season.

Wölfli retired at the end of the 2019-20 season, after helping Young Boys win their third consecutive Super League title. His final appearance was in a 3–1 win against St. Gallen on 3 August 2020, playing 72 minutes before being subbed off to a standing ovation.

== International career ==
Wölfli earned his first international cap for Switzerland in the friendly match against Finland on 19 November 2008. After his injury on 9 December he lost his number one status at Young Boys and from then on did not play for Switzerland anymore.

== Honours ==
Young Boys

- Swiss Super League: 2017–18, 2018–19, 2019–20
- Swiss Cup: 2019–20
