= Orhan Mustafi =

Swiss footballer of Albanian descent (born 1990)

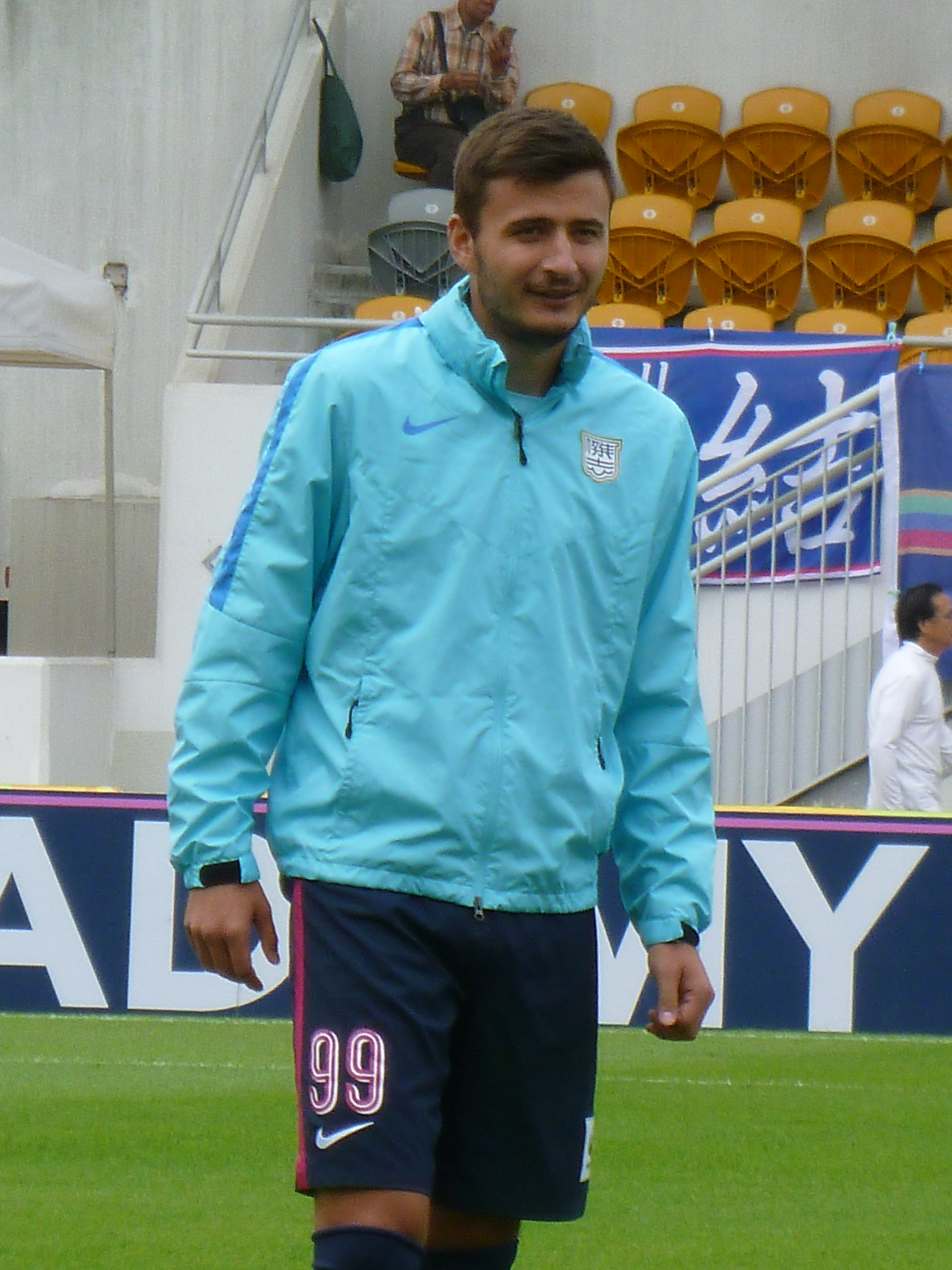

Personal information
- Full name: Orhan Mustafi
- Date of birth: 4 April 1990 (age 36)
- Place of birth: Kumanovo, SR Macedonia, SFR Yugoslavia
- Height: 1.90 m (6 ft 3 in)
- Position: Striker

Team information
- Current team: Young Fellows Juventus
- Number: 10

Youth career
- –2003: FC Domat/Ems
- 2003–2006: Grasshoppers

Senior career*
Years	Team	Apps	(Gls)
2006–2008	FC Zürich	1	(0)
2008–2009	FC Basel U-21	8	(5)
2008–2011	FC Basel	12	(4)
2009–2010	→ FC Aarau (loan)	18	(4)
2010–2011	→ Arminia Bielefeld (loan)	12	(5)
2011–2014	Grasshoppers	22	(8)
2013	→ FC Wil (loan)	0	(0)
2013–2014	→ Ross County (loan)	7	(0)
2014	→ FC Lugano (loan)	8	(0)
2014–2016	FC Le Mont	40	(13)
2016–2017	Kitchee	2	(0)
2017–2018	Rapperswil-Jona	3	(0)
2019–	Young Fellows Juventus	1	(1)

International career
2008–2009	Switzerland U-19	6	(3)
2009–2010	Switzerland U-20	3	(2)
2008–2010	Switzerland U-21	5	(0)
- * Club domestic league appearances and goals as of 19 November 2017

Orhan Mustafi (Macedonian: Орхан Мустафи; born 4 April 1990 in Kumanovo, SR Macedonia, SFR Yugoslavia) is a Swiss footballer of Albanian descent who plays for Young Fellows Juventus.

== Career ==
=== Youth football ===
Mustafi, who moved to Switzerland as a child, began his youth football with local club FC Domat/Ems. In 2003, he was scouted by Grasshopper Club Zürich and joined their youth department. After three years with the Grasshoppers, he moved to city and local rival FC Zürich in July 2006 on a two year youth contract. He made just one appearance for Zürich, as a substitute against FC St. Gallen, and as his contract ran to an end he moved on as free agent.

=== Basel ===
On 9 June 2008, Mustafi signed for FC Basel on a free transfer. He joined Basel's first team for their 2008–09 season under head coach Christian Gross and he was one of the first players who had the advantage of the initial structures before the foundation of the Youth Campus Basel. After playing in seven test games, in which he scored five goals, Mustafi played his domestic league debut for his new club in the home game in the St. Jakob-Park on 9 August 2008. He scored his first goal for his new team in the same game. In fact he got on the score sheet twice, because he scored the team's second and third goal as Basel won 4–0 against Vaduz. Four days later, he made his first European appearance in a Basel shirt on 13 August 2008, as a substitute in a goalless draw against Vitória S.C. at Estádio D. Afonso Henriques in a Champions League Qualifying match. On 27 October FCB announced that Mustafi's application to become a Swiss national had been successful. At the end of the 2008–09 Super League season Basel were third in the table, seven points behind new champions Zürich and one adrift of runners-up Young Boys. The team ended the 2008–09 UEFA Champions League group stage in last position with just one point, behind Barcelona, Sporting CP and Shakhtar Donetsk.

In their following season under new head coach Thorsten Fink, after just four competition matches, on 1 October 2009, FC Basel announced they had loaned Mustafi out to FC Aarau until the end of the season, to gain more playing experience. However, his stay with Aarau was disastrous, because Mustafi was among the three players to be omitted from the squad and banished to the reserve team. After this one season in Aarau, Mustafi returned to Basel, again he was loaned out, this time to German second division club Arminia Bielefeld.

Following this loan spell in Germany Mustafi's contract was terminated. During his time with the club, Mustafi played a total of 45 games for Basel scoring a total of 22 goals. 12 of these games were in the Swiss Super League, three in the Swiss Cup, six in the UEFA competitions (Champions League and Europa League) and 24 were friendly games. He scored four goals in the domestic league, two in the cup, one in the Europa League and the other 15 were scored during the test games.

=== Grasshopper Club ===
On 23 June 2011, Mustafi moved from Basel to Grasshopper Club Zürich, where he had played as a youth, signing a deal lasting until 2014. Ahead of the 2012–13 season, the club announced Mustafi will be joining a club on loan to gain first team practice. During the second half of the season he was loaned out to FC Wil.

On 1 August 2013, Mustafi signed for Scottish Premiership side Ross County on loan. Two days later at the start of 2013–14 season, Mustafi made his debut, coming on as a substitute in the 83rd minute for Kevin Luckassen, in a 2–1 loss against Celtic. Three weeks later, Mustafi scored his first goal in the second round of Scottish League Cup in a 3–2 loss against Stranraer. However, as the season progressed, Mustafi struggled to earn the first team place, after suffering a broken toe. On 3 January 2014, Ross County announced that Mustafi had left the club following the end of his loan deal.

Following his return to Switzerland Mustafi was loaned out until the end of the season. He played for Lugano, who at that time played in the Challenge League, the second tier of Swiss football. Mustafi's contract with GC ran until 30 June 2014, after which it was not renewed.

=== Frequent club changes ===
From October 2014 to June 2016 Mustafi played for Football-Club Le Mont-sur-Lausanne in the Challenge League.

On 29 November 2016 Mustafi signed with Hong Kong side Kitchee and was given the number 99 shirt. He made his debut five days later in a 0–0 draw against Eastern. On 11 January 2017, Kitchee terminated their contract with Mustafi. He had made only two league appearances and one cup appearance. Despite this, he won the championship and the national cup as a result.

Following his return to Switzerland Mustafi was free agent. Then for the 2017–18 season he joined Rapperswil-Jona, who at that time played in the Promotion League, the third tier of Swiss football.

On 25 January 2019, Mustafi joined Young Fellows Juventus.

In summer 2019 Mustafi joined FC Hakoah an amateur club from Zürich who played in the 5. Liga, the ninth and lowest tier in Swiss football.

== International career ==
Mustafi has represented Switzerland at under–19 and under–21 level.

== Personal life ==
On 27 October 2008, he gained a Swiss passport, but also has Albanian and Macedonian dual-nationalities. Mustafi has declared to the media that he may play for Albania in the future.
