= Christophe Lambert (footballer) =

Swiss footballer (born 1987)

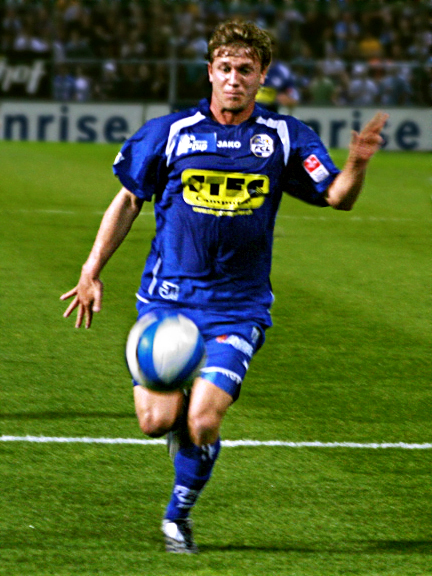

Personal information
- Full name: Christophe Lambert
- Date of birth: 23 February 1987 (age 39)
- Place of birth: Nidwalden, Switzerland
- Height: 1.71 m (5 ft 7 1/2 in)
- Position: Right back

Team information
- Current team: AC Bellinzona
- Number: 14

Youth career
- 1995–2000: SC Buochs
- 2000–2004: FC Luzern

Senior career*
| Years | Team | Apps | (Gls) |
| 2004–2011 | FC Luzern | 114 | (2) |
| 2011– | AC Bellinzona | | |

International career^{‡}
| 2007–2008 | Switzerland U-21 | 7 | (0) |
- * Club domestic league appearances and goals as of 20 May 2008 ‡ National team caps and goals as of 20 May 2008

Christophe Lambert (born 23 February 1987) is a Swiss footballer who plays as a defender for AC Bellinzona.
