= Labinot Sheholli =

Kosovar footballer (born 1988)

Personal information
- Full name: Labinot Sheholli
- Date of birth: 9 July 1990 (age 36)
- Place of birth: SFR Yugoslavia (present day Kosovo)
- Height: 1.87 m (6 ft 2 in)
- Position: Defensive midfielder

Team information
- Current team: Biel-Bienne
- Number: 27

Youth career
- 2000–2005: Biel-Bienne

Senior career*
Years	Team	Apps	(Gls)
2005–2006	Biel-Bienne	10	(0)
2006–2007	FC Zürich II	32	(3)
2007–2008	FC St. Gallen	1	(0)
2008–2012	Biel-Bienne	102	(10)
2012–2013	FC Aarau	9	(1)
2013–2014	FC Köniz	11	(3)
2014–2015	Biel-Bienne	16	(0)
2015–2016	Breitenrain		
2016–	Biel-Bienne		
- * Club domestic league appearances and goals as of 26 October 2019

Labinot Sheholli (Serbian: Лабинот Шехоли, Labinot Šeholi; born 9 July 1988) is an ethnic Albanian professional footballer from Kosovo who plays for Swiss side Biel-Bienne as a defensive midfielder. He holds Swiss citizenship having lived most of his life in Switzerland.

== Club career ==
In summer 2015 he joined Breitenrain, but he rejoined FC Biel as player/assistant coach in 2016.

== Personal life ==
After moving to Switzerland in the mid-1990s, Sheholli and his brother Kastriot have played alongside each other at Biel-Bienne.
