= Daniel Fanger =

Swiss footballer (born 1988)

Personal information
- Date of birth: 11 August 1988 (age 38)
- Place of birth: Lucerne, Switzerland
- Height: 1.90 m (6 ft 3 in)
- Position: Defender

Team information
- Current team: SC Kriens
- Number: 3

Youth career
- –2006: SC Kriens
- 2006–2010: FC Luzern II

Senior career*
Years	Team	Apps	(Gls)
2007–2010	→ SC Kriens (loan)	85	(14)
2010–2012	FC Luzern	15	(0)
2012	→ FC Aarau (loan)	11	(0)
2013–2014	FC Sursee	20	(1)
2014–	SC Kriens	39	(2)
- * Club domestic league appearances and goals as of 6 July 2012

Daniel Fanger (born 11 August 1988) is a Swiss professional footballer who plays as a defender for SC Kriens in the Swiss Promotion League.
