= Luca Ferricchio =

Italian-Swiss football player (born 1983)

Personal information
- Full name: Luca Ferricchio
- Date of birth: 7 April 1983 (age 43)
- Place of birth: Italy
- Height: 1.78 m (5 ft 10 in)
- Position: Defender

Team information
- Current team: FC Schötz
- Number: 5

Youth career
- –2004: FC Schötz

Senior career*
| Years | Team | Apps | (Gls) |
| 2004–2007 | SC YF Juventus | 75 | (4) |
| 2007–2008 | SC Cham | 20 | (1) |
| 2008–2010 | SC Kriens | 57 | (5) |
| 2010–2011 | FC Schötz | 14 | (0) |
| 2011 | Zug 94 | 12 | (2) |
| 2011–2012 | SC Kriens | 22 | (0) |
| 2012– | FC Schötz | 75 | (3) |
- * Club domestic league appearances and goals as of 26 November 2015

Luca Ferricchio (born 7 April 1983) is an Italian-Swiss football player who plays for FC Schötz. He formerly played for SC YF Juventus and SC Cham.

== See also ==
- Football in Switzerland
- List of football clubs in Switzerland
