= Alessandro Ciarrocchi =

Swiss footballer (born 1988)

Personal information
- Date of birth: 3 January 1988 (age 38)
- Place of birth: Winterthur, Switzerland
- Height: 1.90 m (6 ft 3 in)
- Position: Forward

Senior career*
Years	Team	Apps	(Gls)
2005–2006	Winterthur	2	(1)
2006–2008	Piacenza	4	(0)
2008	→ Pistoiese (loan)	10	(0)
2008–2013	Bellinzona	121	(28)
2013–2014	Chiasso	26	(8)
2014–2015	Köniz	28	(9)
2015–2016	Chiasso	34	(9)
2016–2018	Aarau	62	(14)
2018–2020	Yverdon	40	(17)
2020–2021	Bavois	8	(1)
2021–2022	Rapperswil-Jona	24	(5)

International career
2007–2008	Switzerland U20	2	(1)
2009–2010	Switzerland U21	8	(1)
- * Club domestic league appearances and goals

Alessandro Ciarrocchi (born 3 January 1988) is a Swiss former footballer.

== Biography ==
Born in Winterthur, Canton of Zürich, Ciarrocchi started his career at FC Winterthur. In 2006, he was signed by Italian Serie B club Piacenza. On 1 September 2008 Ciarrocchi returned to Switzerland for Bellinzona in temporary deal. The Swiss Italian club signed him outright in April 2009. He followed the club relegated to 2011–12 Swiss Challenge League and again to 2013–14 1. Liga Promotion, which he played once.

On 26 August 2013 Ciarrocchi was signed by Chiasso to a 1+1 year contract. On 17 June 2016 he was signed by FC Aarau to a 2-year contract.
