= Serkan Şahin =

Turkish footballer (born 1988)

Personal information
- Full name: Serkan Şahin
- Date of birth: 15 February 1988 (age 38)
- Place of birth: Breitenbach, Switzerland
- Height: 1.75 m (5 ft 9 in)
- Positions: Right back; right wing; defensive midfielder

Youth career
- FC Bubendorf
- –2005: FC Basel

Senior career*
Years	Team	Apps	(Gls)
2005–2006	→ SC Dornach (loan)	24	(3)
2006–2008	FC Basel U-21	63	(4)
2008–2010	FC Basel	15	(1)
2010–2014	Konyaspor	64	(2)
2014–2015	Fethiyespor	10	(1)
2015–2019	BSC Old Boys	81	(3)

International career
2009–2010	Turkey U21	8	(0)
2011	Turkey A2	1	(0)
- * Club domestic league appearances and goals as of 15 September 2015

Serkan Şahin (born 15 February 1988) is a Turkish former footballer who played mainly as a defender, but also as defensive midfielder.

== Career ==
Şahin began his children's football with local club FC Bubendorf, but soon moved to the youth department of FC Basel, where he advanced successfully through the ranks. In summer 2005 he was in their U-18 team, but his coach Patrick Rahmen told Şahin that there were too many players in the squad. FCB sent three players, under these were the coaches son Yannick, Şahin and Marc Troller, on loan to local amateur club SC Dornach, who at that time played in the 1. Liga, the third tier of Swiss football. After a successful season in Dornach, where the first named two soon advanced to becoming regular players, they returned to Basel's U-21 under coach Heinz Hermann and became regular playing time here as well.

The coaching staff of the first team were watching Şahin's progress and he was called into Basel's first team during their 2008–09 season under head coach Christian Gross. After playing in ten test games Şahin played his domestic league debut for the club in the home game in the St. Jakob-Park on 15 February 2009 as Basel played a goalless draw with Grasshopper Club. At the end of the 2008–09 Super League season Basel were third in the table, seven points behind new champions Zürich and one adrift of runners-up Young Boys. Şahin had four appearances.

Basel joined the 2009–10 UEFA Europa League in the second qualifying round. Şahin scored his first goal for his team in the home game in the St. Jakob-Park, the first leg of this qualifier on 16 July 2009. His long distance left footed shot was the first goal of the match as Basel won 3–0 against Andorran club Santa Coloma. Basel advanced to the group stage, in which despite winning three of the six games the ended in third position and were eliminated. They finished four points behind group winners Roma and one behind Fulham, against whom they lost 3–2 in the last game of the stage. Şahin had 5 appearances in 12 European games. At the end of the 2009–10 season he won the Double with his club. They won the League Championship title with 3 points advantage over second placed Young Boys. In the Swiss Cup via SC Cham, FC Le Mont, Zürich, FC Biel-Bienne and in the semi-final SC Kriens, Basel advanced to the final, and winning this 6–0 against Lausanne-Sport they won the competition.

In the off-season Şahin received an offer from Turkey and he decided on a move. During his time with the first team Şahin played a total of 55 games for Basel scoring that one goal. 15 of these games were in the Swiss Super League, two in the Swiss Cup, five in the Europa League and 33 were friendly games.

In June 2010, Şahin joined Turkish side Konyaspor. In January 2014 he moved to Fethiyespor, who played in the Turkish second division. In January 2015 he returned to Switzerland and somewhat later he joined BSC Old Boys, who at that time played in the Promotion League, the third tier of Swiss football. In the summer of 2019 Şahin retired from active football.

Şahin played for Turkish U-21 team and wanted to play for Turkey at senior level.

== Honours ==
Basel

- Swiss Super League: 2010
- Swiss Cup: 2010

== Sources ==
- Die ersten 125 Jahre. Publisher: Josef Zindel im Friedrich Reinhardt Verlag, Basel. ISBN 978-3-7245-2305-5
- Verein "Basler Fussballarchiv" Homepage
