= Marco Aratore =

Swiss footballer (born 1991)

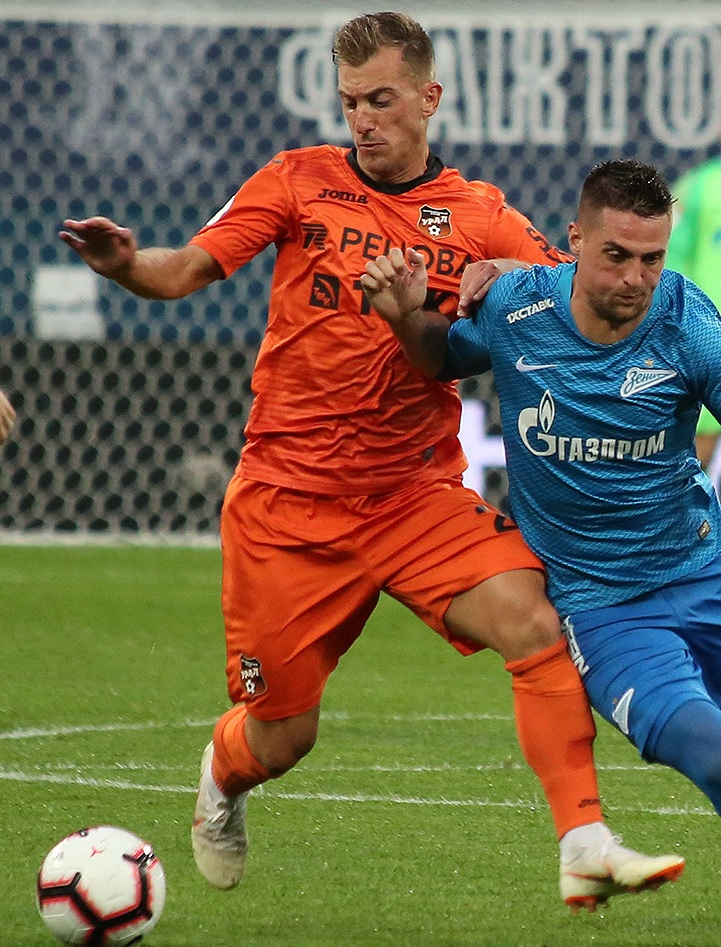
- Aratore (L) with Ural Yekaterinburg in 2018

Personal information
- Full name: Marco Calogero Aratore
- Date of birth: 4 June 1991 (age 35)
- Place of birth: Basel, Switzerland
- Height: 1.77 m (5 ft 9 1/2 in)
- Position: Midfielder

Team information
- Current team: Basel (U-21 assistant)

Youth career
- –2008: Basel

Senior career*
Years	Team	Apps	(Gls)
2008–2010	Basel U21	18	(6)
2009–2013	Basel	1	(0)
2009–2010	→ Thun (loan)	7	(2)
2010–2012	→ Aarau (loan)	45	(3)
2012	Basel U21	16	(13)
2013	→ Winterthur (loan)	18	(5)
2013–2014	Winterthur	35	(14)
2014–2018	St. Gallen	131	(19)
2018–2020	Ural Yekaterinburg	21	(0)
2019–2020	→ Lugano (loan)	22	(3)
2020–2022	Aarau	47	(5)
2022–2023	Basel U21	6	(0)

International career
2006–2007	Switzerland U-16	9	(0)
2007–2008	Switzerland U-17	9	(2)
2008–2009	Switzerland U-18	7	(3)
2009–2010	Switzerland U-19	13	(3)
2010–2012	Switzerland U-20	9	(1)

Managerial career
- 2023: Basel (U-14 assistant)
- 2023–: Basel (U-21 assistant)
- * Club domestic league appearances and goals

Marco Calogero Aratore (born 4 June 1991) is a Swiss football coach and a former player who played as a midfielder. He is a youth coach at Basel. He was Swiss youth international footballer.

== Career ==
=== Club ===
==== Basel ====
Youth career

Aratore played in the youth department of FC Basel, advancing regularly through the ranks. He played in the Swiss championship at U-16 level in the 2005–06 season, winning the championship with a 3–0 win in the final against the U-16 team from FC Winterthur. In the 2006–07 championship season, the team repeated the success by winning the final 5–0 against Servette U-16. Aratore himself scored the team's fourth goal. For the 2007–08 season, Aratore advanced to the U-18 they ended the league season in third position, but were able to win the cup at U-18 level. In the final held on 15 June 2008 in the Gurzelen football stadium in Biel/Bienne, the Basler juniors were a goal behind. But then, Aratore scored the equaliser in the 68th minute and five minutes later he netted the winner, as Basel won 2–1 against the U-18 from Team-Luzern-Kriens.

Senior career

Aratore then advanced to their U-21 team in 2008 and one year later he signed a professional contract and was brought up into their first team squad under head coach Thorsten Fink. After playing in six test games Aratore played his professional debut for the club in the second qualifying round of the 2009–10 UEFA Europa League on 23 July 2009. It was an away game in Estadi Comunal d'Aixovall, in Andorra la Vella and Aratore played the full 90 minutes as Basel won 4–1 against Santa Coloma. However, he was unable to obtain a place in the first team in the domestic league, to gain match experience Aratore played in the U-21. Nevertheless, Fink gave Aratore two further appearances in the qualification and on in the Europa League group stage. He also had two appearances in the 2009–10 Swiss Cup, scoring the first goal in the 3–1 away win against FC Le Mont on 17 October.

Loan to Thun

After the winter break, the same situation, therefore, Aratore was loaned to FC Thun for three months for the rest of the 2009–10 Challenge League season. The special status as a youth national player allowed this late loan transfer. Aratore had seven championship appearances for them and prepared four and scored two goals. Thun ended the season as division champions and achieved promotion.

Loan to Aarau

For the 2010–11 Challenge League season, Aratore was loaned out to FC Aarau, who had just suffered relegation. Under head coach Ranko Jakovljević, Aratore played his debut for Aarau on 26 July 2010 as Aarau won the home game 2–0 against Locarno. He scored his first goal for his new team in the away game at the Schützenwiese, it was the team's second goal as they won 2–1 against Winterthur. Aratore had 23 appearances that season, preparing four goals and scoring three. He also had two appearances in the cup. The team did not fulfil their expectations and they ended the season in lowly 11th position.

Aratore's loan to Aarau was extended for further year. The team was more successful in is period, but somewhat frustrating for the player. By the end of the season, he had received only nine chances in the starting formation. He had 13 further appearances as substitute but remained the other games on the bench. The team ended the season in second position and qualified for the promotion/relegation play-off. But this was lost 2–1 on aggregate against Sion, Aratore sat both games on the bench. Aratore did not score a league goal, but netted once in the first round of the 2011–12 Swiss Cup as Aarau won the away game 8–0 against amateur club Amicitia Riehen.

Loan to Winterthur

In August 2012 Aratore returned to Basel but played for the U-21 side in the 1. Liga Promotion, the third highest tier of Swiss football. On 17 January 2013 it was announced that he was loaned to Winterthur, under head coach Boro Kuzmanović. Again it was stated that Aratore could again gain more playing experience in a higher league. The loan went well for both the player and his new team. Aratore played in all 18 games until the end of the season and, in each, in the starting formation. He prepared seven goals and scored five himself. The team finished the season in third position.

==== Winterthur ====
In Summer 2013 Aratore's contract with Basel expired, therefore he signed a permanent contract with Winterthur. It was a disappointing season for the club as their aim had been to play for promotion. But it was another good season for the player. Aratore played 35 games, each one in the starting formation, of the 36 league matches that season, missing one because of a suspension. He played the assist to the goal on nine occasions and scored 14 goals himself. Winterthur ended the season in sixth position in the table.

==== St. Gallen ====
In Summer 2014 Aratore transferred to St. Gallen under head coach Jeff Saibene, with a contract over four-years. His first season was difficult for him, he had 24 league appearances, but 16 of them were as substitute. The team ended the 2014–15 Super League season in sixth position with 46 points well clear of the relegation zone.

Aratore's status with FC St.Gallen improved with the start of the 2015–16 Super League season under new coach Josef Zinnbauer. The midfielder established himself with the team, after a mixed first season and played regularly, usually in the starting eleven. But the team were playing against relegation, constantly situated in the bottom half of the table. Aratore had 33 appearances, scoring four goals. He scored a brace in the third last game of the season, as FCSG won 3–0 against Zürich and this ensured that St. Gallen remained in the league. Zürich suffered relegation.

The 2016–17 Super League didn't start to well for FCSG, and they were situated near the bottom of the table. But they stabilised themselves before the winter break and climbed to a mid-field position directly after the break. They ended the season in seventh position but were clear of the relegation zone. Aratore played all 36 league matches, 32 of which in the starting formation, and he scored on four occasions.

On 31 October 2017 it was announced that Aratore had extended his contract with St. Gallen under new head coach Giorgio Contini. The 2017–18 Super League ran better for the team, they remained in the top half of the table throughout. Despite losing nine of the last ten matches, they ended in fifth position and thus achieved qualification for the Europa League second qualifying round. Aratore played all 36 of the season's league games, all but one in the starting formation and he scored eight league goals.

==== Ural Yekaterinburg ====
It was announced on 13 August 2018, that Aratore had signed a three-year contract with the Russian club Ural Yekaterinburg and that it was first engagement abroad. The club confirmed the news the same day, Aratore has signed a long-term contract with FC Ural Yekaterinburg. The team ended the 2018–19 Russian Premier League in 10th place, whilst they were runners up in the Russian Cup to Lokomotiv Moscow. Aratore had 19 appearances in the league and five in the cup, but without scoring a goal.

Loan to Lugano

On 10 July 2019, Aratore returned to Switzerland and joined FC Lugano on loan for the 2019–20 Super League season. Directly on his debut, he scored his first goal for his new team as they won 4–0 against Zürich. All matches in Switzerland between 28 February and end of May were postponed due to outbreak of COVID-19 in Switzerland. Aratore returned to Yekaterinburg at the end of June, thus missing the last 12 games of the season. He had 22 appearances in the league, scoring three goals, two in the cup, scoring once. Lugano were qualified for the Europa League group stage and Aratore played all six games. In the last game of the group stage, on 12 December, away against Dynamo Kyiv Aratore scored the first goal of the game just before half time. The equaliser came in the fourth minute of extra time and the game ended with a 1–1 draw. However, Lugano finished in last position and were knocked out.

Return to Ural Yekaterinburg

Aratore played the first two 2019–20 Russian Premier League matches for Ural Yekaterinburg, but then suffered a muscle strain and was out injured for a month. On 23 September 2020, two months after his return to Russia, his Ural contract was terminated by mutual consent.

==== Aarau ====
On 28 September 2020, Aratore again returned to Switzerland and re-joined FC Aarau and signed a three-year contract, under new head coach Stephan Keller. Aratore had missed the first two game of the 2020–21 Challenge League and the team started somewhat slow into the season, being in the lower half of the table, but with a few better results they climbed to the upper half by the winter break. The team ended the season in fifth position, even on points with third placed Lausanne Ouchy, but six points below the leading two teams. Aratore played 34 games, 14 in the starting formation and was used 20 times as joker, he prepared six goals and scored four himself.

Again, in the 2021–22 league season Aratore was mainly used as joker, not missing a match until the end of October. On 6 November, Aratore was honoured for his 100th appearance in the FCA jersey in advance of the home game against Yverdon-Sport which ended with a 1–0 victory. After that he played just one more match before he suffered an injury. He didn't play a single minute in the second half of the season after being out for several weeks due to a hip injury.

==== Basel ====
On 4 July 2022, Aratore returned to Basel and was assigned to the club's Under-21 squad that played in the third-tier Swiss Promotion League. During the first nine matches that season, he had four appearances in the starting formation and two as substitute, but from then he was longer used. After half a season as a routine reinforcement for the U-21, Aratore decided to retire from his active playing career, this mainly due to his increasingly frequent physical complaints.

=== International career ===
Aratore has played for various Swiss youth teams, playing nine games for both the U-16 team and the U-17 team and seven games for the U-18 team. He has also played 13 games for the Switzerland U-19 team, scoring three goals.

He made his international U-20 debut as substitute on 6 September 2010 in the 2–3 home defeat in the Stadion Breite, Schaffhausen, against German U-20 team. He scored his first goal for the Swiss U-20 team on 31 August 2011 in the 3:2 home win against the Italian U-20 team.

=== Post-playing career ===
On 11 January 2023, Aratore retired from playing and was appointed an assistant coach for Basel's Under-14 squad as he continued his coaching education. Ahead of the 2023-24 season, Aratore was moved to a new position as assistant coach for the club's U-21 squad under manager Dennis Hediger.

== Private life ==
Aratore was born in Basel, Switzerland and is of Italian descent. He is married to Sabrina and the couple have two sons. One of the main reasons why the family returned from Russia early, was because the children were reaching school age and in Russia children can only go to school if they can speak Russian.

== Titles and honours ==
=== Basel ===
- Swiss champion at U-16 level: 2005–06, 2006–07
- Swiss Cup winner at U-18 level: 2007–08
- Swiss Super League champion: 2010
- Swiss Cup winner: 2010

=== Thun ===
- Swiss Challenge League: 2009–10

== Sources ==
- Josef Zindel (2018). FC Basel 1893. Die ersten 125 Jahre (in German). Basel: Friedrich Reinhardt Verlag. ISBN 978-3-7245-2305-5.
