= 2015–16 Grasshopper Club Zurich season =

Grasshopper Club Zurich
2015–16 season
- Chairman: Stephan Anliker
- Manager: Pierluigi Tami
- Stadium: Letzigrund
- Super League: 4th
- Swiss Cup: Second round
- Top goalscorer: League: Mu'nas Dabbur (19); All: Mu'nas Dabbur (22)
- Average home league attendance: 6,461

== Matches ==
=== Legend ===
Win Draw Loss Postponed

=== Friendly matches ===
==== Preseason ====
26 June 2015	FC Rapperswil-Jona (Switzerland)	2 – 0	(Switzerland) Grasshopper Club Zurich	Rapperswil-Jona
18:00 CEST	da Silva 13', 23'	Report		Stadium: Sportanlage Grünfeld; Attendance: 650

30 June 2015	Grasshopper Club Zurich (Switzerland)	1 – 1	(Switzerland) FC Biel-Bienne	Niederhasli
14:00 CEST	Dabbur 4'	Report	Marchesano 58'	Stadium: GC/Campus; Attendance: 300; Referee: Sandro Schärer

2 July 2015	SPG Arlberg (Austria)	0 – 18	(Switzerland) Grasshopper Club Zurich	St. Anton, Austria
18:00 CEST		Report	Kamberi 13', 18', 20', 37', 48', 54'; Bašić 14'; Roberto Alves 21', 53' ? 27' (o.g.); Ben Khalifa 30', 42', 44', 50'; Tarashaj 39', 41', 49'; Gjorgjev 51'	Stadium: Sportanlage

3 July 2015	FC Winterthur (Switzerland)	3 – 4	(Switzerland) Grasshopper Club Zurich	Winterthur
15:30 CEST	Bengondo 13'; Fassnacht 26'; Foschini 73'	Report	Dabbur 33', 56'; Tarashaj 38'; Kamberi 77'	Stadium: Reitplatz; Referee: Tomasz Superczynski

11 July 2015	Grasshopper Club Zurich (Switzerland)	3 – 0	(Austria) SC Rheindorf Altach	Niederhasli
15:00 CEST	Tarashaj 26', 37'; Dabbur 86'			Stadium: GC/Campus; Attendance: 700; Referee: Nicolas Jancevski

==== Midseason ====
29 July 2015	Grasshopper Club Zurich (Switzerland)	5 – 0	(Switzerland) SC YF Juventus ZH	Niederhasli
19:00 CET	Kamberi 36', 75'; Sherko 57'; Gjorgjev 73'; Roberto Oliveira Alves 85'			Stadium: GC/Campus

4 September 2015	Grasshopper Club Zurich (Switzerland)	1 – 2	(Austria) FC Admira Wacker Mödling	Niederhasli
17:00 CET	Ravet 9'	Report	11' Spiridonović; 17' Starkl	Stadium: GC/Campus; Attendance: 500; Referee: Lionel Tschudi

==== Winter break ====
15 January 2016	Grasshopper Club Zurich (Switzerland)	6 - 2	(Switzerland) FC Aarau	Niederhasli
14:30 CET		Summary		Stadium: GC/Campus

22 January 2016	Grasshopper Club Zurich (Switzerland)	1 - 2	(Germany) SpVgg Greuther Fürth	Marbella, Spain
16:00 CET		Summary

26 January 2016	Grasshopper Club Zurich (Switzerland)	3 - 3	(Norway) Lillestrøm SK	Marbella, Spain
16:00 CET		Summary

30 January 2016	SC Freiburg (Germany)	1 - 3	(Switzerland) Grasshopper Club Zurich	Freiburg im Breisgau, Germany
14:00 CET		Summary

=== Super League ===
Kickoff times are in CET

==== League results and fixtures ====
First half of season

19 July 2015 Round 1	Thun	3 – 5	Grasshopper Club	Stockhorn Arena, Thun
13:45	Buess 15'; Frontino (yellow card) 39'; Bürki (yellow card) 41'; Munsy 76'; Barthe 87' (o.g.)	Report	2' Caio; 8' Ravet; 30' Marko Bašić; 40' Dabbur; 45' Tarashaj	Attendance: 6'011; Referee: (Switzerland) Sascha Amhof

25 July 2015 Round 2	Grasshopper Club	2 – 3	Basel	Letzigrund, Zürich
20:00	Dabbur 30'; Caio 32'; (yellow card) 91'	Report	(yellow card) 17' Kuzmanović; 21' Gashi; 38' (yellow card) 80'Janko; 68' Lang; (yellow card) 84' Xhaka; (yellow card) 88' Elneny	Attendance: 9'600; Referee: (Switzerland) Alain Bieri (Solothurn)

2 August 2015 Round 3	FC Zürich	2 – 3	Grasshopper Club	Letzigrund, Zürich
16:00	Simonyan 34'; Koch (yellow card) 53'; Buff 60'; Djimsiti (yellow card) 65'	Report	8', 42' Tarashaj; (yellow card) 67' Gülen; 93' Kamberi	Attendance: 11'153; Referee: (Switzerland) Adrien Jaccottet (Basel)

8 August 2015 Round 4	Grasshopper Club	6 – 1	FC Lugano	Letzigrund, Zürich
17:45	Ravet 1'; Caio 41'; Tarashaj 45', 67' (yellow card) 77'; Dabbur 48'; Marko Bašić 90'	Report	(yellow card) 48' Russo; 59' Bottani; (yellow card) 54' Sabbatini	Attendance: 5'100; Referee: (Switzerland) Alain Bieri (Solothurn)

13 August 2015 Round 5	FC Vaduz (Liechtenstein)	3 – 3	Grasshopper Club	Rheinpark Stadion, Vaduz
19:45	Costanzo 24'; Messaoud 79'; Burgmeier 82'; Ciccone (yellow card) 83'	Summary	Dabbur 22'; Ravet 37'; Nikola Gjorgjev 79'	Attendance: 4,123; Referee: (Switzerland) Urs Schnyder

23 August 2015 Round 6	FC St. Gallen	0 - 2	Grasshopper Club	AFG Arena, St. Gallen
13:45	Everton Luiz (yellow card) 32'	Summary	Caio Alves 4'; Gülen (yellow card) 34'; Dabbur 49'; Harun Alpsoy (yellow card) 81'	Attendance: 13,700; Referee: (Switzerland) Pascal Erlachner

30 August 2015 Round 7	Grasshopper Club	3 - 2	BSC Young Boys	Letzigrund, Zürich
16:00	Ravet 15'; Tarashaj 40'; Caio Alves 59'; Källström (yellow card) 86'; Kamberi (yellow card) 90+1'	Summary	Bertone (yellow card) 21'; Lecjaks (yellow card) 38'; Vilotić 68'; Kubo 80'	Attendance: 7,300; Referee: (Switzerland) Sascha Amhof

13 September 2015 Round 8	FC Luzern	3 - 3	Grasshopper Club	Swissporarena, Lucerne
13:45	Lezcano 11' 77' (pen.) (yellow card) 89' (yellow-red card); Schneuwly 16'; Schachten (yellow card) 43'; Lustenberger (yellow card) 60'	Summary	Barthe (yellow card) 2'; Ravet 23'; Pnishi 26'; Dabbur (yellow card) 43' (goal) 87'; Bauer (yellow card) 64'; Bašić (yellow card) 69'; Vasic (yellow card) 77'	Attendance: 13,403; Referee: (Switzerland) Fedayi San (Gebenstorf)

23 September 2015 Round 9	Grasshopper Club	2 - 0	FC Sion	Letzigrund, Zürich
19:45	Caio Alves 34'; Källström (yellow card) 69'; Ravet 74'	Summary	Zverotić (yellow card) 12'; Lacroix (yellow card) 81'; Kouassi (yellow card) 85'	Attendance: 3,900; Referee: (Switzerland) Alain Bieri (Solothurn)

26 September 2015 Round 10	Grasshopper Club	1 - 1	St. Gallen	Letzigrund, Zürich
17:45	Tarashaj 53'; Sherko Karim (yellow card) 77'	Summary	Everton Luiz (yellow card) 31'; Lang (yellow card) 67'; Mutsch 73'	Attendance: 5,500; Referee: (Switzerland) Sascha Amhof

4 October 2015 Round 11	Young Boys	3 - 1	Grasshopper Club	Stade de Suisse, Bern
13:45	Denis Zakaria (yellow card) 12'; Bertone 21'; Sulejmani 37'; Steffen (yellow card) 45+3' (goal) 90+5'; Hadergjonaj (yellow card) 74'	Summary	Gülen (yellow card) 2'; Dabbur (yellow card) 34' (goal) 50'; Lüthi (yellow card) 74'; Pnishi (yellow card) 79'; Gjorgjev (yellow card) 90+2'	Attendance: 22,500; Referee: (Switzerland) Adrien Jaccottet (Basel)

17 October 2015 Round 12	Grasshopper Club	1 - 0	Luzern	Letzigrund, Zürich
17:45	Dabbur 5'; Bauer (yellow card) 11'; Pnishi (yellow card) 53'; Brahimi (yellow card) 90+5'	Summary	Kryeziu (yellow card) 14'; Schneuwly (yellow card) 53'; Lustenberger (yellow card) 90+5'	Attendance: 6,500; Referee: (Austria) Robert Schörgenhofer

25 October 2015 Round 13	Sion	3-2	Grasshopper Club	Stade Tourbillon, Sion
13:45

31 October 2015 Round 14	Grasshopper Club	1-2	Thun	Letzigrund, Zürich
17:45	Källström (yellow card) 34'; Brahimi 64'; Pnishi (yellow card) 90+1'	Summary	Munsy 66'; Schirinzi (yellow card) 72' (goal) 79'; Faivre (yellow card) 88'	Attendance: 4,000; Referee: (Switzerland) Adrien Jaccottet (Basel)

8 November 2015 Round 15	Basel	2 – 3	Grasshopper Club	St. Jakob-Park, Basel
16:00	Boëtius (yellow card) 27'; Callà 62'; Embolo 74'	[ (Report)]	(yellow card) 15' Bauer; 19' (yellow card) 8' Källström; 25' (o.g.) Suchý; (yellow card) 52' Pnishi; (yellow card) 65' Barthe; 80' (yellow card) 90' Dabbur	Attendance: 31,669; Referee: Sascha Amhof

21 November 2015 Round 16	Grasshopper Club	2-0	(Liechtenstein) Vaduz	Letzigrund, Zürich
17:45	Bašić (yellow card) 67'; Loosli (yellow card) 71'; Caio Alves 86' (yellow card) 86'; Kamberi 90+2'	Summary	Bühler (yellow card) 58'; Costanzo (yellow card) 65'; Jehle (yellow card) 83'	Attendance: 3,600; Referee: (Switzerland) Sébastien Pache

29 November 2015 Round 17	Grasshopper Club	5-0	Zürich	Letzigrund, Zürich
16:00	Dabbur 15'; Gülen (yellow card) 21'; Ravet 58'; Tarashaj 64'; Caio Alves 71'; Källström 90+1'	Summary	Grgic (yellow card) 51'; Vinícius Freitas (yellow card) 66'; Buff (yellow card) 90'; Sadiku (yellow card) 90+3'	Attendance: 14,000; Referee: (Switzerland) Sandro Schärer

6 December 2015 Round 18	Lugano	v	Grasshopper Club	Cornaredo, Lugano

Second half of season

7 February 2016 Round 19	Young Boys	v	Grasshopper Club	Stade de Suisse, Bern
		[ Summary]

14 February 2016 Round 20	Grasshopper Club	0 – 4	Basel	Letzigrund, Zürich
16:00	Bašić (yellow card) 25'; Lüthi (yellow card) 34'	[ (Report)]	12', 54' Lang; 20' Suchý; (red card) 31' Janko; (yellow card) 70' Delgado; 90+3' Zuffi	Attendance: 9,500; Referee: (Switzerland) Alain Bieri (Solothurn)

2015 Round 21	Grasshopper Club	v	Sion	Letzigrund, Zürich
		[ Report]

27 February 2015 Round 22	Vaduz (Liechtenstein)	v	Grasshopper Club	Rheinpark Stadion, Vaduz
		[ Report]

7 March 2015 Round 23	St. Gallen	v	Grasshopper Club	AFG Arena, St. Gallen
		[ Report]

13 March 2015 Round 24	Grasshopper Club	v	Zürich	Letzigrund, Zürich
		[ Report]

20 March 2015 Round 25	Grasshopper Club	v	Lugano	Letzigrund, Zürich
		[ Report]

3 April 2015 Round 26	Thun	v	Grasshopper Club	Stockhorn Arena, Thun
		[ Report]

2015 Round 27	Grasshopper Club	v	Luzern	Letzigrund, Zürich
		[ Report]

16 April 2015 Round 28	Sion	v	Grasshopper Club	Stade Tourbillon, Sion
		[ Report]

2015 Round 29	Zürich	v	Grasshopper Club	Letzigrund, Zürich
		[ Report]

2015 Round 30	Grasshopper Club	v	St. Gallen	Letzigrund, Zürich
		[ Report]

30 April 2015 Round 31	Grasshopper Club	1 – 2	Young Boys	Letzigrund, Zürich
17:45	Dabbur 54'	[ Report]	42' Ravet; 44' Bertone	Attendance: 5,200; Referee: (Switzerland) Adrien Jaccottet (Basel)

8 May 2015 Round 32	Lugano	v	Grasshopper Club	Cornaredo, Lugano
		[ Report]

11 May 2015 Round 33	Luzern	v	Grasshopper Club	Swissporarena, Luzern
		[ Report]

16 May 2015 Round 34	Grasshopper Club	v	(Liechtenstein) Vaduz	Letzigrund, Zürich
		[ Report]

22 May 2015 Round 35	Grasshopper Club	v	Thun	Letzigrund, Zürich
		[ Report]

25 May 2016 Round 36	Basel	0 – 1	Grasshopper Club	St. Jakob-Park, Basel
20:30	Boëtius (yellow card) 77'	(Summary)	41' (o.g.) Traoré; (yellow card) 51' Bašić; (yellow card) 52' Dabbur; (yellow card) 52' Källström; (yellow card) 80' Kamberi	Attendance: 30,682; Referee: (Switzerland) Stephan Klossner

==== League table ====
Pos	Team	Pld	W	D	L	GF	GA	GD	Pts	Qualification or relegation
2	Young Boys	36	20	9	7	78	47	+31	69	Qualification for the Champions League third qualifying round
3	Luzern	36	15	9	12	59	50	+9	54	Qualification for the Europa League third qualifying round
4	Grasshopper	36	15	8	13	65	56	+9	53	Qualification for the Europa League second qualifying round
5	Sion	36	14	8	14	52	49	+3	50	
6	Thun	36	10	11	15	45	54	−9	41	

Source: Swiss Super League, Soccerway
Rules for classification: 1) Points; 2) Goal difference; 3) Goals scored; 4) Head-to-head points 5) Draw.

=== Swiss Cup ===
Kickoff times are in CET

16 August 2015 1st Round	SC Cham (Canton of Zug)	1 - 4	(Canton of Zurich) Grasshopper Club Zurich	Cham
14:00		Summary		Stadium: Eizmoos

18 September 2015 2nd Round	FC Köniz (Canton of Bern)	3 - 1	(Canton of Zurich) Grasshopper Club Zurich	Köniz
19:00	Altin Osmani 5' 87'; Ermin Gigic 26'		6' Dabbur	Stadium: Hessgut-Liebefeld; Attendance: 2,300; Referee: Lukas Fähndrich

== Squad ==
=== Squad, matches played and goals scored ===
No.	Name	Nationality	Position	Date of birth (age)	at GCZ since	Signed from	SL matches	SL goals	Cup matches	Cup goals
Goalkeepers
1	Vaso Vasic	(Switzerland) (Serbia)	GK	26 April 1990 (age 36)	2014	Schaffhausen	0	0	0	0
18	Joël Mall	(Switzerland)	GK	5 April 1991 (age 35)	06/2015	Aarau	0	0	0	0
33	Timothy Dieng	(Senegal) (Switzerland)	GK	23 November 1994 (age 31)	2013	Grenchen	0	0	0	0
Defenders
3	Nemanja Antonov	(Serbia)	CB	6 May 1995 (age 31)	07/2015	OFK Beograd	0	0	0	0
5	Alexandre Barthe	(France) (Bulgaria)	CB	5 March 1986 (age 40)	06/2015	Ludogorets Razgrad	0	0	0	0
6	Alban Pnishi	(Kosovo) (Switzerland)	CB	20 October 1990 (age 36)	06/2015	Wohlen	0	0	0	0
22	Benjamin Lüthi	(Switzerland)	CB	30 November 1988 (age 37)	01/2015	unattached	0	0	0	0
23	Jean-Pierre Rhyner	(Switzerland) (Peru)	CB	16 March 1996 (age 30)	07/2015	own youth	0	0	0	0
29	Levent Gülen	(Switzerland) (Turkey)	CB	24 February 1994 (age 32)	2014	Kayserispor	0	0	0	0
34	Moritz Bauer	(Switzerland)	CB	25 February 1992 (age 34)	2010		0	0	0	0
Midfielders
4	Kim Källström	(Sweden)	MF	24 August 1982 (age 44)	06/2015	FC Spartak Moscow	0	0	0	0
7	Jordan Brown	(Germany) (Jamaica)	MF	12 November 1991 (age 34)	01/2015	Wil	0	0	0	0
8	Marko Bašić	(Croatia)	MF	25 May 1988 (age 38)	07/2015	FC Lugano	0	0	0	0
16	Manuel Kubli	(Switzerland)	MF	9 April 1995 (age 31)	07/2015	FC Rapperswil-Jona	0	0	0	0
31	Harun Alpsoy	(Switzerland) (Turkey)	MF	3 March 1997 (age 29)	07/2015	own youth	0	0	0	0
35	Nikola Gjorgjev	(Switzerland) (North Macedonia)	MF	22 August 1997 (age 29)	02/2015	own youth	0	0	0	0
Forwards
9	Mu'nas Dabbur	(Israel)	ST	14 May 1992 (age 34)	2014	Maccabi Tel Aviv	0	0	0	0
14	Yoric Ravet	(France)	ST	12 September 1989 (age 37)	2014	Lausanne	0	0	0	0
21	Caio	(Brazil)	ST	29 May 1986 (age 40)	2013	Atlético Goianiense	0	0	0	0
25	Sherko Karim	(Iraq)	ST	25 May 1996 (age 30)	03/2015	Al Shorta	0	0	0	0
26	Florian Kamberi	(Switzerland)	ST	8 March 1995 (age 31)	07/2015	own youth	0	0	0	0
30	Shani Tarashaj	(Switzerland) (Albania)	ST	7 February 1995 (age 31)	2013	own youth	0	0	0	0

Last updated: 2 August 2015

Note: Numbers in parentheses denote substitution appearances.

Players in italic left the club during the season

=== Transfers ===
Summer Transfers in
Name	Nationality	Position	Type	Moving from
Kim Källström	(Sweden)	MF	Transfer	(Russia) Spartak Moscow
Marko Bašić	(Croatia)	MF	Transfer	(Switzerland) Lugano
Alban Pnishi	(Kosovo) (Switzerland)	CB	Transfer	(Switzerland) Wohlen
Nemanja Antonov	(Serbia)	CB	Transfer	(Serbia) OFK Beograd
Alexandre Barthe	(France) (Bulgaria)	CB	Transfer	(Bulgaria) Ludogorets Razgrad
Manuel Kubli	(Switzerland)	MF	loan return	(Switzerland) Rapperswil-Jona
Joël Mall	(Switzerland)	GK	Transfer	(Switzerland) Aarau

Summer Transfers out
Name	Nationality	Position	Type	Moving to
Michael Lang	(Switzerland)	CB	Transfer	(Switzerland) Basel
Anatole Ngamukol	(Equatorial Guinea) (France)	MF	Transfer	unknown
Michael Dingsdag	(Netherlands)	CB	Transfer	(Netherlands) Breda
Sanel Jahić	(Bosnia and Herzegovina) (France)	CB	Transfer	unknown
Krisztián Vadócz	(Hungary)	MF	Transfer	unknown
Matteo Fedele	(Switzerland)	MF	loan return	(Switzerland) Sion
Amir Abrashi	(Albania) (Switzerland)	MF	Transfer	(Germany) Freiburg
Alexander Merkel	(Kazakhstan) (Germany)	MF	loan return	(Italy) Udinese
Gregory Wüthrich	(Switzerland)	CB	loan return	(Switzerland) Young Boys
Gianluca Hossmann	(Switzerland)	CB	Transfer	unknown
Ulisses Garcia	(Switzerland) (Portugal)	CB	Transfer	(Germany) Werder Bremen
Daniel Pavlović	(Switzerland) (Croatia)	CB	Transfer	(Italy) Frosinone
Nassim Ben Khalifa	(Switzerland) (Tunisia)	ST	Transfer	(Turkey) Eskişehirspor
Daniel Davari	(Iran) (Germany)	GK	Transfer	(Germany) Arminia Bielefeld
Stéphane Grichting	(Switzerland)	CB	retired	

== Coaching staff ==
Position	Staff
Manager	(Switzerland) Pierluigi Tami
Assistant coach	(Romania) Zoltan Kadar
Fitness coach	(France) Nicolas Dyon
Goalkeeper coach	(Switzerland) Christoph Born

Last updated: 1 June 2015
Source: GCZ Official Site
