= 2014–15 Grasshopper Club Zurich season =

Grasshopper Club Zurich
2014–15 season
- Chairman: Stephan Anliker
- Manager: Michael Skibbe (until 8 January); Zoltan Kadar (interim); Pierluigi Tami (from 15 January)
- Stadium: Letzigrund
- Super League: 8th
- Swiss Cup: Quarter-finals
- UEFA Champions League: Third qualifying round
- UEFA Europa League: Play-off round
- Top goalscorer: League: Mu'nas Dabbur (13); All: Mu'nas Dabbur (16)
- Average home league attendance: 6,173

== Matches ==
=== Legend ===
Win Draw Loss Postponed

=== Friendly matches ===
==== Preseason ====
14 June 2014	FC Freienbach (Switzerland)	0 – 6	(Switzerland) Grasshopper Club Zurich	Freienbach
15:00 CEST		(Report) (in German)	9' Dingsdag; 16', 17' Tarashaj; 37' Kahraba; 69' Kubli; 82' Caio	Stadium: Chrummen; Attendance: 580; Referee: Tomasz Superczynski

16 June 2014	SC Rheindorf Altach (Austria)	1 – 2	(Switzerland) Grasshopper Club Zurich	Dornbirn, Austria
17:00 CEST	Prokopič 89'	(Report) (in German)	6' Kahraba; 10' Pavlović	Stadium: Birkenwiese; Attendance: 300

19 June 2014	FC Winterthur (Switzerland)	3 – 1	(Switzerland) Grasshopper Club Zurich	Winterthur
15:30 CEST	Kuzmanović 3'; Tighazoui 14', 53'	(Report) (in German)	18' Kahraba	Stadium: Reitplatz; Attendance: 200

22 June 2014	Grasshopper Club Zurich (Switzerland)	4 – 1	(Switzerland) FC Wil 1900	Niederhasli
16:00 CEST	Caio 21'; Ravet 41'; Dabbur 63'; Gashi 79'	(Report) (in German)	77' Wellington	Stadium: GC-Campus; Attendance: 900

27 June 2014	FC Thun (Switzerland)	2 – 0	(Switzerland) Grasshopper Club Zurich	Schwarzenburg
18:30 CEST	Cássio 62'; Salinas 63'	(Report) (in German)		Stadium: Pöschen; Attendance: 865; Referee: Fedayi San

5 July 2014	Grasshopper Club Zurich (Switzerland)	0 - 0	(Switzerland) Servette FC	Niederhasli
15:00 CEST		Report		Stadium: GC-Campus; Attendance: 500

8 July 2014	Grasshopper Club Zurich (Switzerland)	3 - 1	(Switzerland) FC Wohlen	Niederhasli
14:30 CEST	Ngamukol 28', 40'; Salatić 71'	Report	5' Buess	Stadium: GC-Campus; Attendance: 400

10 July 2014	SPG Arlberg (Austria)	0 - 20	(Switzerland) Grasshopper Club Zurich	St. Anton, Austria
18:00 CEST		Report	1', 25' Ravet; 10', 13', 17', 30' Ngamukol; 27' Tarashaj; 31' Kubli; 32', 49', 50', 58', 58', 60' Dabbur; 34', 36' Abrashi; 39' Al-Abbadie; 41', 54' Kahraba; 43' Feltscher	Stadium: Sportplatz; Attendance: 200

11 July 2014	Grasshopper Club Zurich (Switzerland)	0 - 2	(Russia) FC Spartak Moscow	Niederhasli
17:30 CEST		Report	9' Costa; 30' Ananidze	Stadium: GC-Campus; Attendance: 900

==== Mid-season (fall) ====
12 November 2014	Grasshopper Club Zurich (Switzerland)	3 - 1	(Switzerland) SC YF Juventus ZH	Niederhasli
19:00 CET	Ben Khalifa 36'; Caio 53', 80'	Report	63' Ardit Mamudi	Stadium: GC-Campus; Attendance: 348

==== Winter break ====
14 January 2015	Grasshopper Club Zurich (Switzerland)	2 - 0	(Switzerland) FC Schaffhausen	Niederhasli
14:30 CET	Dabbur 7' (pen.); Anatole 60'	Report		Stadium: GC-Campus; Attendance: 200; Referee: Alain Bieri

20 January 2015	Fortuna Düsseldorf (Germany)	0 - 3	(Switzerland) Grasshopper Club Zurich	Estepona, Spain
16:00 CET		Report	1', 17' Dabbur; 50' Ravet	Attendance: 200

24 January 2015	FC Ingolstadt 04 (Germany)	6 - 0	(Switzerland) Grasshopper Club Zurich	San Pedro de Alcántara, Spain
15:00 CET	Morales 14' (pen.); Pledl 35', 72'; Hartmann 36'; Max Christiansen 67'; Julian Günther-Schmidt 88'	Report		Stadium: Marbella Football Center

28 January 2015	Grasshopper Club Zurich (Switzerland)	5 - 0	(Switzerland) FC Biel-Bienne	Niederhasli
14:00 CET	Jahić 20'; Anatole 47'; Salatić 60'; Tarashaj 80'; Ben Khalifa 89'	Report		Stadium: GC-Campus; Attendance: 200; Referee: Fedayi San

31 January 2015	Grasshopper Club Zurich (Switzerland)	2 - 1	(Switzerland) FC Wohlen	Niederhasli
14:00 CET	Dabbur 20'; Ben Khalifa 25'	Report	65' Brahimi	Stadium: GC-Campus; Attendance: 300

==== Mid-season (spring) ====
17 February 2015	Grasshopper Club Zurich (Switzerland)	2 - 2	(Switzerland) FC Winterthur	Niederhasli
14:30 CET	Tarashaj 76', 87' (pen.)	Report	55' Hajrović; 55' Krasniqi	Stadium: GC-Campus; Attendance: 100; Referee: Alain Bieri

25 March 2015	FC Rapperswil-Jona (Switzerland)	0 - 3	(Switzerland) Grasshopper Club Zurich	Rapperswil-Jona
19:00 CET			72' Vadócz; 75' Jahić; 81' Merkel	Stadium: Sportanlage Grünfeld; Attendance: 650

7 April 2015	Grasshopper Club Zurich (Switzerland)	6 - 0	(Switzerland) SC YF Juventus	Niederhasli
16:00 CET	Abrashi 19'; Hossmann 27'; Florian Kamberi 51'; Ben Khalifa 60'; Jan Loosli 64'; Jordan Brown 66'			Stadium: GC-Campus

==== Tournaments ====
===== 3-Städte-Turnier Uster =====
Game duration 45 min

2 July 2014	Selection Zürich Oberland (Switzerland)	0 – 5	(Switzerland) Grasshopper Club Zurich	Uster
19:00 CEST		(Report) (in German)	23', 34', 39' Anatole; 33', 37' Tarashaj	Stadium: Buchholz; Attendance: 500

2 July 2014	FC Winterthur (Switzerland)	0 – 1	(Switzerland) Grasshopper Club Zurich	Uster
20:00 CEST		(Report) (in German)	26' Dabbur	Stadium: Buchholz; Attendance: 500

===== Frankfurt Cup 2015 =====
Game duration 2x10 min (indoor tournament)

10 January 2015	Eintracht Frankfurt (Germany)	3 – 1	(Switzerland) Grasshopper Club Zurich	Frankfurt, Germany
17:45 CET	Piazon 4', 19'; Rosenthal 16'	(Report) (in German)	15' Dabbur	Stadium: Fraport Arena; Attendance: 4'200

10 January 2015	FSV Frankfurt (Germany)	2 – 2	(Switzerland) Grasshopper Club Zurich	Frankfurt, Germany
18:39 CET	Toski 5'; Belegu 18'	(Report) (in German)	7', 19' Dingsdag	Stadium: Fraport Arena; Attendance: 4'200

10 January 2015	SpVgg Greuther Fürth (Germany)	7 – 0	(Switzerland) Grasshopper Club Zurich	Frankfurt, Germany
20:04 CET	Weilandt 1', 2'; Przybyłko 5'; Civelek 10'; Kartalis 15'; Stiepermann 19', 20'	(Report) (in German)		Stadium: Fraport Arena; Attendance: 4'200

10 January 2015	SV Darmstadt 98 (Germany)	4 – 3	(Switzerland) Grasshopper Club Zurich	Frankfurt, Germany
21:25 CET	Stegmayer 2', 11', 12'; Firat 14'	(Report) (in German)	5' Lang; 10' Dabbur; 15' (pen.) Ben Khalifa	Stadium: Fraport Arena; Attendance: 4'200

=== Super League ===
Kickoff times are in CET

==== League results and fixtures ====
20 July 2014 Round 1	FC Zürich	1 - 0	Grasshopper Club Zurich	Zürich
16:00	Kecojević (yellow card) 27'; Kukeli (yellow card) 52'; Chiumiento 59'; Djimsiti (yellow card) 65'; Koch (yellow card) 76'	Summary	Grichting (yellow card) 35'; Lang (yellow card) 65'	Stadium: Letzigrund; Attendance: 13,683; Referee: (Switzerland) Stephan Studer

26 July 2014 Round 2	Grasshopper Club Zurich	2 - 3	FC Thun	Zürich
17:45	Dabbur 20' 32'; Kahraba (yellow card) 36' (yellow-red card); Grichting (yellow card) 80'	Summary	Schneuwly 9', 19', 75'; Siegfried (yellow card) 34'; González (yellow card) 41'; Glarner (yellow card) 84'	Stadium: Letzigrund; Attendance: 4,200; Referee: (Switzerland) Fedayi San

2 August 2014 Round 3	Grasshopper Club Zurich	0 - 0	FC Sion	Zürich
20:00	Dabbur (yellow card) 55'; Jahić (yellow card) 74'; Pavlović (yellow card) 76'; Grichting (yellow card) 83'	Summary	Perrier (yellow card) 8'; Vanczák (yellow card) 64'; Lacroix (yellow card) 75'; Matteo Fedele (yellow card) 90+6'	Stadium: Letzigrund; Attendance: 3,800; Referee: (Switzerland) Adrien Jaccottet

10 August 2014 Round 4	FC Luzern	1 - 1	Grasshopper Club Zurich	Lucerne
13:45	Schneuwly 19' (yellow card) 64'; Sarr (yellow card) 43'; Lezcano (red card) 78'	Summary	Lang 13'; Grichting (yellow card) 27' (yellow-red card); Shani Tarashaj (yellow card) 84'; Dabbur (yellow card) 86'; Pavlović (yellow card) 90+3'	Stadium: Swissporarena; Attendance: 11,391; Referee: (Switzerland) Nikolaj Hänni

13 August 2014 Round 5	BSC Young Boys	4 - 0	Grasshopper Club Zurich	Bern
19:45	Nuzzolo 21' 90+2'; Gregory Wüthrich 48'; Frey 73'	Summary	Sinkala (yellow card) 46'; Moritz Bauer (yellow card) 53'	Stadium: Stade de Suisse; Attendance: 14,362; Referee: (Switzerland) Stephan Klossner

16 August 2014 Round 6	FC Aarau	1 - 2	Grasshopper Club Zurich	Aarau
17:45	Garat 84'	Summary	Kahraba 6'; Salatić (yellow card) 44'; Ngamukol 80'; Lang (yellow card) 90+2'	Stadium: Stadion Brügglifeld; Attendance: 5,277; Referee: (Switzerland) Pascal Erlachner

31 August 2014 Round 7	Grasshopper Club Zurich	0 - 1	(Liechtenstein) FC Vaduz	Zürich
13:45	Merkel (yellow card) 28'; Kahraba (yellow card) 88'	Summary	Muntwiler 37' (yellow card) 53'; Nick von Niederhäusern (yellow card) 61'; Neumayr (yellow card) 64'	Stadium: Letzigrund; Attendance: 3,916; Referee: (Switzerland) Adrien Jaccottet

13 September 2014 Round 8	Grasshopper Club Zurich	3 - 1	FC Basel	Zürich
17:45	Ngamukol 12'; Dingsdag 45'; Lang 73'	Summary	Safari (yellow card) 35'; Díaz (yellow card) 37'; Zuffi 39'; Delgado (yellow card) 74'; Callà (yellow card) 81' (yellow-red card)	Stadium: Letzigrund; Attendance: 7,700; Referee: (Switzerland) Sascha Amhof

24 September 2014 Round 9	FC St. Gallen	3-0	Grasshopper Club Zurich	St. Gallen
19:45	Tréand 4' (yellow card) 61'; Čavušević (yellow card) 28'; Tafer 29'; Rodriguez 90+3' (pen.)	Summary	Ravet (yellow card) 26'; Grichting (yellow card) 50'	Stadium: AFG Arena; Attendance: 12,636; Referee: (Switzerland) Alain Bieri

27 September 2014 Round 10	Grasshopper Club Zurich	2 - 1	FC Aarau	Zürich
17:45	Ravet 25'; Abrashi (yellow card) 35' (goal) 64'; Dingsdag (yellow card) 55'; Jahić (yellow card) 83'	Summary	Mlinar (yellow card) 12'; N'Ganga 74'; Marco Thaler (yellow card) 86'; Djurić (yellow card) 87'	Stadium: Letzigrund; Attendance: 4,000; Referee: (Switzerland) Sébastien Pache

4 October 2014 Round 11	FC Thun	3 - 2	Grasshopper Club Zurich	Thun
17:45	Sadik 8' (pen.); Schirinzi 32'; Frontino 38'; Glarner (yellow card) 76'	Summary	Jahić (yellow card) 8'; Ravet (yellow card) 36'; Kahraba 81'; Lang 90'	Stadium: Stockhorn Arena; Attendance: 5,526; Referee: (Switzerland) Stephan Studer

19 October 2014 Round 12	Grasshopper Club Zurich	1 - 3	FC Zürich	Zürich
16:00	Caio 15'; Gülen (yellow card) 68'; Grichting (red card) 88'	Summary	29', 82' Etoundi; (yellow card) 69' Kajević; 75' Rodriguez; (yellow card) 88' Chermiti	Stadium: Letzigrund; Attendance: 19'200; Referee: (Switzerland) Alain Bieri

26 October 2014 Round 13	FC Vaduz (Liechtenstein)	1 - 1	Grasshopper Club Zurich	Vaduz
16:00	Hasler (yellow card) 32'; Schürpf 42'; S. Lang (yellow card) 75'	Summary	(yellow card) 12' Dabbur; 58' Anatole; (red card) 75' Abrashi; (yellow card) 85' Dingsdag	Stadium: Rheinpark Stadion; Attendance: 4'072; Referee: (Switzerland) Stephan Klossner

1 November 2014 Round 14	FC Basel	2 - 0	Grasshopper Club Zurich	Basel
20:00	Gashi (yellow card) 61' (goal) 23'; González 47'	Summary	(yellow card) 39' Kahraba; (yellow card) 74' Pavlović; (yellow card) 81' Dingsdag	Stadium: St. Jakob-Park; Attendance: 29,339; Referee: (Switzerland) Sascha Amhof

8 November 2014 Round 15	Grasshopper Club Zurich	3 - 0	FC St. Gallen	Zürich
20:00	Jahić (yellow card) 52'; Salatić 58' (yellow card) 59'; Ravet (yellow card) 61'; Dabbur 88', 90'	Summary	(yellow card) 11' Russo; (yellow card) 15' Bunjaku; (yellow card) 63' Janjatović; (yellow card) 90+3' Mathys	Stadium: Letzigrund; Attendance: 6'600; Referee: (Switzerland) Stephan Klossner

22 November 2014 Round 16	Grasshopper Club Zurich	3 - 2	FC Luzern	Zürich
20:00	Dabbur 32'; Ben Khalifa 34'; Dingsdag (yellow card) 63'; Caio 83'	Summary	50' Freuler; 57' Doubai; (yellow card) 63' Schneuwly; (yellow card) 72' Rabello; (red card) 81' Aliti; (yellow card) 86' Sarr	Stadium: Letzigrund; Attendance: 5'700; Referee: (Austria) Oliver Drachta

29 November 2014 Round 17	FC Sion	3 - 3	Grasshopper Club Zurich	Sion
20:00	Konaté (yellow card) 21'; Christofi 32'; Pa Modou 49', 90+2'	Summary	(yellow card) 16' Salatić; 24' Ravet; (yellow card) 36' Pavlović; (yellow card) 48' Gülen; 51' (yellow card) 62' Dabbur; (yellow card) 75' Lang; 85' (pen.) Caio	Stadium: Stade de Tourbillon; Attendance: 7'700; Referee: (Switzerland) Sascha Amhof

6 December 2014 Round 18	Grasshopper Club Zurich	0 - 1	BSC Young Boys	Zürich
20:00	Salatić (yellow card) 34'; Bauer (yellow card) 45+1'; Gülen (yellow card) 49'; Grichting (yellow card) 87'	Summary	6' Vilotić; (yellow card) 29' Hoarau; (yellow card) 81' Sanogo; (yellow card) 90+3' Mvogo	Stadium: Letzigrund; Attendance: 5'600; Referee: (Switzerland) Adrien Jaccottet

8 February 2015 Round 19	Grasshopper Club Zurich	2 - 4	FC Basel	Zürich
16:00	Abrashi (yellow card) 31'; Dabbur 49'; Bauer (yellow card) 55'; Lang 74'	Report	28' Elneny; 69' Gashi; 73' Streller; 81' Callà; (yellow card) 83' González; (yellow card) 86' Delgado	Stadium: Letzigrund; Attendance: 6'300; Referee: (Switzerland) Alain Bieri

14 February 2015 Round 20	BSC Young Boys	4 - 2	Grasshopper Club Zurich	Bern
20:00	Kubo 19'; Hoarau 45', 51'; Vilotić (yellow card) 64'; Steffen 68'	Report	(yellow card) 20' Bauer; (yellow card) 56' (goal) 67' Dabbur; (yellow card) 62' Abrashi; 87' Ben Khalifa	Stadium: Stade de Suisse; Attendance: 12'660; Referee: (Switzerland) Sandro Schärer

21 February 2015 Round 21	Grasshopper Club Zurich	0 - 2	FC Zürich	Zürich
17:45	Dingsdag (red card) 15'; Ben Khalifa (yellow card) 37'	Report	(yellow card) 15' Chikhaoui; (yellow card) 42' Djimsiti; 52' Kajević; (yellow card) 61' Schneuwly; 62' Chermiti	Stadium: Letzigrund; Attendance: 9'300; Referee: (Switzerland) Adrien Jaccottet

1 March 2015 Round 22	FC St. Gallen	1 - 1	Grasshopper Club Zurich	St. Gallen
13:45	Besle (yellow card) 74'; Kapiloto (yellow card) 74'; Rodríguez 89' (pen.)	Report	(yellow card) 21' Ben Khalifa; 31' Lang; (yellow card) 63' Lüthi; (yellow card) 73' Pavlović; (yellow card) 79' Vasić; (yellow card) 87' Anatole	Stadium: AFG Arena; Attendance: 13'175; Referee: (Switzerland) Alain Bieri

7 March 2015 Round 23	Grasshopper Club Zurich	1 - 0	FC Luzern	Zürich
17:45	Caio 40' (yellow card) 69'; Wüthrich (yellow card) 73'	Summary	(yellow card) 51' Wiss; (yellow card) 77' Freuler	Stadium: Letzigrund; Attendance: 4'500; Referee: (Switzerland) Nikolaj Hänni

14 March 2015 Round 24	FC Thun	2 - 2	Grasshopper Club Zurich	Thun
20:00	Frontino 10' (yellow card) 25'; Wittwer 46'	Summary	(yellow card) 59' Vadócz; (yellow card) 64' Abrashi; 63' (yellow card) 74' Dabbur; (yellow card) 84' Gjorgjev; 90+2' Tarashaj	Stadium: Stockhorn Arena; Attendance: 5'047; Referee: (Switzerland) Urs Schnyder

21 March 2015 Round 25	Grasshopper Club Zurich	2 - 2	FC Aarau	Zürich
20:00	Ravet 22'; Caio 57'; Fedele (yellow card) 65'; Dabbur 73'	Summary	(yellow card) 43' Garat; 48' Slišković; (yellow card) 49' Burki	Stadium: Letzigrund; Attendance: 5'700; Referee: (Switzerland) Nikolaj Hänni

3 April 2015 Round 26	FC Sion	0 - 5	Grasshopper Club Zurich	Sion
20:30	Fernandes (yellow card) 21'; Konaté (yellow card) 34'; Kouassi (yellow card) 61' (yellow-red card)	Summary	8', 25' Vadócz; 18' Abrashi; 23' Dabbur; 37' Caio; (yellow card) 71' Grichting	Stadium: Stade de Tourbillon; Attendance: 8'500; Referee: (Switzerland) Adrien Jaccottet

12 April 2015 Round 27	Grasshopper Club Zurich	1 - 1	(Liechtenstein) FC Vaduz	Zürich
13:45	Dabbur (yellow card) 37'; Caio (yellow card) 57' (goal) 67'; Ravet (yellow card) 84'; Grichting (yellow card) 87'	Summary	(yellow card) 22' von Niederhäusern; 73' (yellow card) 78' Neumayr	Stadium: Letzigrund; Attendance: 5'100; Referee: (Switzerland) Fedayi San

19 April 2015 Round 28	FC Luzern	2 - 0	Grasshopper Club Zurich	Lucerne
16:00	Rogulj (yellow card) 57'; Schneuwly 28', 66'; Lustenberger (yellow card) 42'	Summary	(yellow card) 11' Wüthrich; (yellow card) 61' Vadócz; (yellow card) 78' Grichting; (yellow card) 87' Caio	Stadium: Swissporarena; Attendance: 11'074; Referee: (Switzerland) Adrien Jaccottet

26 April 2015 Round 29	Grasshopper Club Zurich	2 - 2	BSC Young Boys	Zürich
16:00	Caio (yellow card) 4' (goal) 90+2'; Ravet 72'; Fedele (yellow card) 44'; Lüthi (yellow card) 51'	Summary	(yellow card) 20' (goal) 27' Kubo; (yellow card) 42' Sutter; 46' Hoarau; (yellow card) 63' Nuzzolo	Stadium: Letzigrund; Attendance: 5'800; Referee: (Switzerland) Sascha Amhof

29 April 2015 Round 30	Grasshopper Club Zurich	0 - 0	FC Thun	Zürich
19:45	Vadócz (yellow card) 25'; Abrashi (yellow card) 38'; Lüthi (yellow card) 84'	Summary	(yellow card) 58' Reinmann	Stadium: Letzigrund; Attendance: 3'500; Referee: (Switzerland) Sébastien Pache

2 May 2015 Round 31	Basel	2 – 1	Grasshopper Club Zurich	Basel
20:00	Elneny 55'; Callà (yellow card) 34' (goal) 59'	(Report)	45+1' Ravet; (yellow card) 1' Gülen	Stadium: St. Jakob-Park; Attendance: 28'852; Referee: (Switzerland) Stephan Klossner

8 May 2015 Round 32	FC Aarau	0 – 1	Grasshopper Club Zurich	Aarau
17:45	Costanzo (yellow card) 73'; Garat (yellow card) 81'	Summary	5' Dabbur; (yellow card) 28' Wüthrich; (yellow card) 52' Grichting	Stadium: Stadion Brügglifeld; Attendance: 5'104; Referee: (Switzerland) Stephan Studer

17 May 2015 Round 33	Grasshopper Club Zurich	2 - 0	FC St. Gallen	Zürich
13:45	Fedele (yellow card) 35'; Dabbur 66'; Alves 88'	Summary		Stadium: Letzigrund; Attendance: 7'000; Referee: (Switzerland) Sébastien Pache

20 May 2015 Round 34	Grasshopper Club Zurich	0 - 0	FC Sion	Zürich
19:45	Fedele (yellow card) 49'; Lang (yellow card) 89'	Summary	(yellow card) 25' Salatić; (yellow card) 75' Konaté	Stadium: Letzigrund; Attendance: 3'100; Referee: (Switzerland) Fedayi San

25 May 2015 Round 35	FC Vaduz (Liechtenstein)	0 - 1	Grasshopper Club Zurich	Vaduz
16:00	Ciccone (yellow card) 50'; Neumayr (yellow card) 81'	Summary	70' Caio; (yellow card) 89' Vadócz	Stadium: Rheinpark Stadion; Attendance: 4'710; Referee: (Switzerland) Alain Bieri

29 May 2015 Round 36	FC Zürich	4 - 3	Grasshopper Club Zurich	Zürich
20:30	Schneuwly 14'; Chermiti 23', 73' (yellow card) 90+3'; Sadiku 29' (yellow card) 90+3'; Brecher (yellow card) 90+2'	Summary	3', 45+1' (yellow card) 82' Ravet; 16' Caio; 47' Grichting; (red card) 90+3' Anatole	Stadium: Letzigrund; Attendance: 11'967; Referee: (Switzerland) Adrien Jaccottet

==== League table ====
Pos	Team	Pld	W	D	L	GF	GA	GD	Pts	Qualification or relegation
6	St. Gallen	36	13	8	15	57	65	−8	47	
7	Sion	36	12	9	15	47	48	−1	45	Qualification for the Europa League group stage (Note: Sion qualified for the UEFA Europa League group stage by winning the 2014–15 Swiss Cup.)
8	Grasshopper	36	11	10	15	50	56	−6	43	
9	Vaduz	36	7	10	19	28	59	−31	31	Qualification for the Europa League first qualifying round (Note: Vaduz qualified for the UEFA Europa League first qualifying round by winning the 2014–15 Liechtenstein Cup.)
10	Aarau (R)	36	6	12	18	31	64	−33	30	Relegation to Swiss Challenge League

Source: Swiss Super League
Rules for classification: 1) points; 2) goal difference; 3) number of goals scored
(R) Relegated

=== Swiss Cup ===
Kickoff times are in CET

23 August 2014 1st Round	Vedeggio Calcio (Ticino)	0 - 2	(Canton of Zurich) Grasshopper Club Zurich	Cadempino
18:15		Report	Dabbur 29', 47'	Stadium: Centro sportivo Attendance: 450; Referee: (Switzerland) Luca Gut

19 September 2014 2nd Round	Neuchâtel Xamax (Canton of Neuchâtel)	3 - 5	(Canton of Zurich) Grasshopper Club Zurich	Neuchâtel
14:00	Doudin 14'; Maël Erard 17'; Mickaël Rodríguez 86'	Report	2', 13', 76' Dabbur; 4', 53' Ravet	Stadium: Stade de la Maladière; Attendance: 4,721; Referee: (Switzerland) Sébastien Pache

29 October 2014 3rd Round	FC Lugano (Ticino)	0 - 1 (a.e.t.)	(Canton of Zurich) Grasshopper Club Zurich	Lugano
19:30		Report	112' Tarashaj	Stadium: Cornaredo Stadium; Attendance: 4'200; Referee: (Switzerland) Stephan Studer

4 March 2015 Quarterfinal	FC Zürich (Canton of Zurich)	1 - 0 (a.e.t.)	(Canton of Zurich) Grasshopper Club Zurich	Zürich
20:15	Rodríguez 95'	Report		Stadium: Letzigrund; Attendance: 11'494; Referee: (Switzerland) Stephan Klossner

=== UEFA Champions League ===
Kickoff times are in CET

==== Qualifying rounds ====
30 July 2014 3Q Leg 1	Grasshoppers (Switzerland)	0 – 2	(France) Lille	Zürich, Switzerland
19:00	Salatić (yellow card) 45'; Tarashaj (yellow card) 84'; Abrashi (yellow card) 85'	Report	29' Corchia; 49' Mendes	Stadium: Letzigrund; Attendance: 7'700; Referee: Aleksei Eskov (Russia)

5 August 2014 3Q Leg 2	Lille (France)	1 – 1 (3 – 1 agg.)	(Switzerland) Grasshoppers	Villeneuve-d'Ascq, France
20:30	Balmont 19'; Baša (yellow card) 45+1'; Rodelin (yellow card) 52'; Souaré (yellow card) 90+1'		(yellow card) 25' (goal) 33' Abrashi; (yellow card) 43' Sinkala; (red card) 68' Pavlović; (yellow card) 87' Lang	Stadium: Stade Pierre-Mauroy; Attendance: 25'000; Referee: Anastasios Sidiropoulos (Greece)

=== UEFA Europa League ===
Kickoff times are in CET

21 August 2014 PO 1st Leg	Grasshopper Club Zurich (Switzerland)	1 - 2	(Belgium) Club Brugge KV	St. Gallen, Switzerland
20:15	Lang 8'; Grichting (yellow card) 15'; Salatić (yellow card) 58'; Kahraba (yellow card) 90+3'	Summary	Jahić 14' (o.g.); Víctor Vázquez 15' (yellow card) 69'; De Bock (yellow card) 30'	Stadium: AFG Arena; Attendance: 4,253; Referee: (France) Clément Turpin

28 August 2014 PO 2nd Leg	Club Brugge KV (Belgium)	1 - 0 (3 - 1 agg.)	(Switzerland) Grasshopper Club Zurich	Bruges, Belgium
21:00	Vázquez (yellow card) 42' (goal) 62'; De Bock (yellow card) 87'	Summary		Stadium: Jan Breydel Stadium; Attendance: 23'743; Referee: (Italy) Luca Banti

Notes

1. The match will be played at AFG Arena, St. Gallen instead of Grasshopper's home stadium, due to the European Athletics Championships in Zürich.

== Squad ==
=== Squad, matches played and goals scored ===
No.	Name	Nationality	Position	Date of birth (age)	at GCZ since	Signed from	SL matches	SL goals	Cup matches	Cup goals	CL matches	CL goals	EL matches	EL goals
Goalkeepers
1	Daniel Davari	(Iran) (Germany)	GK	6 January 1988 (age 38)	2014	Braunschweig	9	0	3	0	1	0	1	0
18	Vaso Vasić	(Switzerland) (Serbia)	GK	26 April 1990 (age 36)	2014	Schaffhausen	27(1)	0	1	0	1	0	1	0
33	Timothy Dieng	(Senegal) (Switzerland)	GK	23 November 1994 (age 31)	2013	Grenchen	0	0	0	0	0	0	0	0
Defenders
3	Stéphane Grichting	(Switzerland)	CB	30 March 1979 (age 47)	2012	Auxerre	28	0	2	0	2	0	2	0
4	Sanel Jahić	(Bosnia and Herzegovina) (France)	CB	10 December 1981 (age 44)	2014	St Johnstone	13(1)	0	0	0	2	0	2	0
5	Michael Lang	(Switzerland)	CB	8 February 1991 (age 35)	2011	St. Gallen	35	5	3	0	2	0	2	1
19	Gregory Wüthrich	(Switzerland)	CB	4 December 1994 (age 31)	02/2015	Young Boys	8	0	1	0	0	0	0	0
20	Daniel Pavlović	(Switzerland) (Croatia)	CB	22 April 1988 (age 38)	2011	Kaiserslautern	25	0	4	0	2	0	0	0
22	Benjamin Lüthi	(Switzerland)	CB	30 November 1988 (age 37)	01/2015	unattached	10(1)	0	0	0	0	0	0	0
23	Michael Dingsdag	(Netherlands)	CB	18 October 1982 (age 44)	2013	Sion	25(1)	1	3	0	1	0	0	0
26	Ulisses Garcia	(Switzerland) (Portugal)	CB	11 January 1996 (age 30)	2014	own youth	0	0	0(1)	0	0	0	1	0
27	Gianluca Hossmann	(Switzerland)	CB	25 March 1991 (age 35)	2014	Biel	1(3)	0	1(1)	0	0	0	0	0
29	Levent Gülen	(Switzerland) (Turkey)	CB	24 February 1994 (age 32)	2014	Kayserispor	23	0	4	0	0	0	1	0
32	Noah Loosli	(Switzerland)	CB	23 January 1997 (age 29)	02/2015	own youth	0	0	0	0	0	0	0	0
34	Moritz Bauer	(Switzerland)	CB	25 February 1992 (age 34)	2010		9(7)	0	1	0	0(1)	0	0	0
Midfielders
6	Krisztián Vadócz	(Hungary)	MF	30 May 1985 (age 41)	02/2015	Pune City	12(3)	2	1	0	0	0	0	0
6	Vero Salatić	(Switzerland) (Serbia)	MF	14 November 1985 (age 40)	2012	AC Omonia	10	1	0	0	2	0	1	0
7	Jordan Brown	(Germany) (Jamaica)	MF	12 November 1991 (age 34)	01/2015	Wil	0(2)	0	0(1)	0	0	0	0	0
7	Kahraba	(Egypt)	MF	13 April 1994 (age 32)	2014	ENPPI	5(6)	2	0	0	2(2)	0	1(1)	0
8	Amir Abrashi	(Albania) (Switzerland)	MF	27 March 1990 (age 36)	2012	Winterthur	25(1)	2	3	0	2	1	2	0
10	Alexander Merkel	(Germany) (Kazakhstan)	MF	22 February 1992 (age 34)	2014	Udinese	3(3)	0	1	0	0(1)	0	0(2)	0
16	Matteo Fedele	(Switzerland)	MF	2 July 1992 (age 34)	03/2015	Sion	11(1)	0	0	0	0	0	0	0
16	Manuel Kubli	(Switzerland)	MF	9 April 1995 (age 31)	2014	own youth	0	0	0	0	0	0	0	0
19	Abdulgabar Al-Abbadie	(Switzerland) (Yemen)	MF	21 July 1994 (age 32)	2014	FC Rapperswil-Jona	0	0	0	0	0	0	0(1)	0
22	Nathan Sinkala	(Zambia)	MF	23 April 1991 (age 35)	2014	TP Mazembe	4(3)	0	1	0	2	0	1	0
24	Imran Bunjaku	(Albania) (Kosovo)	MF	18 October 1992 (age 34)	2013	own youth	0	0	1	0	0	0	0	0
31	Etienne Scholz	(Switzerland) (Germany)	MF	3 August 1993 (age 33)	10/2014	FC Bayern München	0	0	0	0	0	0	0	0
35	Nikola Gjorgjev	(Switzerland) (North Macedonia)	MF	22 August 1997 (age 29)	02/2015	own youth	0(2)	0	0	0	0	0	0	0
Forwards
9	Mu'nas Dabbur	(Israel)	ST	14 May 1992 (age 34)	2014	Maccabi Tel Aviv	31	13	4	5	2	0	2	0
14	Yoric Ravet	(France)	ST	12 September 1989 (age 37)	2014	Lausanne	28(6)	7	1(2)	2	2	0	2	0
15	Nassim Ben Khalifa	(Switzerland) (Tunisia)	ST	13 January 1992 (age 34)	2012	Young Boys	8(17)	2	2(1)	0	0	0	0	0
17	Anatole Ngamukol	(France) (Democratic Republic of the Congo)	ST	15 January 1988 (age 38)	2013	Thun	16(14)	3	2(1)	0	0	0	2	0
21	Caio	(Brazil)	ST	29 May 1986 (age 40)	2013	Atlético Goianiense	26(3)	11	2	0	0	0	0	0
30	Shani Tarashaj	(Switzerland)	ST	7 February 1995 (age 31)	2013	own youth	2(17)	1	1(1)	1	0(2)	0	1(1)	0

Last updated: 6 June 2015

Note: Numbers in parentheses denote substitution appearances.

Players in italic left the club during the season

=== Transfers ===
Summer Transfers in
Name	Nationality	Position	Type	Moving from
Vaso Vasić	(Switzerland) (Serbia)	GK	Transfer	(Switzerland) Schaffhausen
Daniel Davari	(Iran) (Germany)	GK	Transfer	(Germany) Braunschweig
Yoric Ravet	(France)	FW	Transfer	(Switzerland) Lausanne
Etienne Scholz	(Switzerland)	MF	Transfer	(Germany) Bayern München
Kahraba	(Egypt)	MF	on loan	(Egypt) ENPPI
Nathan Sinkala	(Zambia)	MF	on loan	(Democratic Republic of the Congo) TP Mazembe
Alexander Merkel	(Germany) (Kazakhstan)	MF	on loan	(Italy) Udinese
Gianluca Hossmann	(Switzerland)	CB	loan return	(Switzerland) Biel
Levent Gülen	(Switzerland) (Turkey)	CB	loan return	(Turkey) Kayserispor

Summer Transfers out
Name	Nationality	Position	Type	Moving to
Roman Bürki	(Switzerland)	GK	Transfer	(Germany) Freiburg
Steven Lang	(Switzerland)	MF	Transfer	(Liechtenstein) Vaduz
Toko Nzuzi	(Switzerland) (Democratic Republic of the Congo)	MF	Transfer	(England) Brighton & Hove Albion
Frank Feltscher	(Switzerland) (Venezuela)	MF	Transfer	(Switzerland) Aarau
Shkëlzen Gashi	(Albania) (Switzerland)	MF	Transfer	(Switzerland) Basel
Albion Avdijaj	(Albania)	MF	Transfer	(Germany) Wolfsburg
Manuel Kubli	(Switzerland)	MF	Transfer	(Switzerland) Rapperswil-Jona
Sead Hajrović	(Switzerland) (Bosnia and Herzegovina)	CB	Transfer	(Switzerland) Winterthur
Davide Taini	(Switzerland)	GK	retired	

Winter Transfers in
Name	Nationality	Position	Type	Moving from
Pierluigi Tami	(Switzerland) (Italy)	M	Transfer	Switzerland U21
Benjamin Lüthi	(Switzerland)	CB	Transfer	no club affiliation
Jordan Brown	(Germany) (Jamaica)	MF	Transfer	(Switzerland) Wil
Krisztián Vadócz	(Hungary)	MF	Transfer	(India) Pune City
Gregory Wüthrich	(Switzerland)	CB	on loan	(Switzerland) Young Boys
Matteo Fedele	(Switzerland)	MF	on loan	(Switzerland) Sion
Sherko Karim	(Iraq)	FW	Transfer	(Iraq) Al Shorta

Winter Transfers out
Name	Nationality	Position	Type	Moving to
Michael Skibbe	(Germany)	M	Transfer	(Turkey) Eskişehirspor
Nathan Sinkala	(Zambia)	MF	loan return	(Democratic Republic of the Congo) TP Mazembe
Kahraba	(Egypt)	MF	loan return	(Egypt) ENPPI
Imran Bunjaku	(Albania) (Kosovo)	MF	Transfer	(Switzerland) Schaffhausen
Vero Salatić	(Switzerland) (Serbia)	MF	Transfer	(Switzerland) Sion
Etienne Scholz	(Switzerland) (Germany)	MF	on loan	(Switzerland) Wil

== Coaching staff ==
Position	Staff
Manager (15/01/2015-)	(Switzerland) Pierluigi Tami
Manager (-08/01/2015)	(Germany) Michael Skibbe
Assistant coach	(Romania) Zoltan Kadar
Fitness coach (12/03/15-)	(France) Nicolas Dyon
Fitness coach (-11/02/15)	(Switzerland) Alex Kern
Goalkeeper coach	(Switzerland) Christoph Born

Last updated: 12 March 2015
Source: GCZ Official Site
