= 2016–17 BSC Young Boys season =

Young Boys
2016–17 season
- Chairman: Werner Müller
- Manager: Adi Hütter
- Stadium: Stade de Suisse
- Super League: 2nd
- Swiss Cup: Quarter finals
- UEFA Champions League: Play-off round
- UEFA Europa League: Group stage
- Average home league attendance: 18,073
Home colours	Away colours	Third colours

The 2016–17 BSC Young Boys season was the club's 118th season in existence and their 13th season in the Swiss Super League.

== Competitions ==
=== Swiss Super League ===
==== League table ====
Pos	Team	Pld	W	D	L	GF	GA	GD	Pts	Qualification or relegation
1	Basel (C)	36	26	8	2	92	35	+57	86	Qualification for the Champions League group stage
2	Young Boys	36	20	9	7	72	44	+28	69	Qualification for the Champions League third qualifying round
3	Lugano	36	15	8	13	52	61	−9	53	Qualification for the Europa League group stage (Note: Since the winners of the 2016–17 Swiss Cup, Basel, qualified for European competition based on league position, the spot awarded to the Swiss Cup winners (Europa League group stage) was passed to the third-placed team, the spot awarded to the third-placed team was passed to the fourth-placed team, and the spot awarded to the fourth-placed team was passed to the fifth-placed team.)
4	Sion	36	15	6	15	60	55	+5	51	Qualification for the Europa League third qualifying round
5	Luzern	36	14	8	14	62	66	−4	50	Qualification for the Europa League second qualifying round

Source: Swiss Super League, Soccerway
Rules for classification: 1) Points; 2) Goal difference; 3) Goals scored; 4) Head-to-head points; 5) Draw.
(C) Champions

==== Results summary ====
Overall								Home						Away					
Pld	W	D	L	GF	GA	GD	Pts	W	D	L	GF	GA	GD	W	D	L	GF	GA	GD
36	20	9	7	72	44	+28	69	13	2	3	52	24	+28	7	7	4	20	20	0

Last updated: 2 June 2017.

==== Results by matchday ====
Matchday	1	2	3	4	5	6	7	8	9	10	11	12	13	14	15	16	17	18	19	20	21	22	23	24	25	26	27	28	29	30	31	32	33	34	35	36
Ground	A	H	H	A	H	A	H	A	A	H	A	H	H	A	H	A	H	A	H	A	H	A	H	A	A	H	A	H	H	A	A	H	A	H	A	H
Result	W	L	W	L	W	L	W	D	D	D	D	W	W	D	W	W	W	W	W	L	D	W	W	D	W	W	D	L	L	W	W	W	L	W	D	W
Position	3	4	2	4	3	3	2	2	2	3	4	3	3	3	2	2	2	2	2	2	2	2	2	2	2	2	2	2	2	2	2	2	2	2	2	2

Updated to match(es) played on 2 June 2017. Source:
A = Away; H = Home; W = Win; D = Draw; L = Loss

==== Matches ====
23 July 2016 Match 1	St. Gallen	0 - 2	Young Boys	St. Gallen
20:00 CET	Angha (yellow card) 72'	(Report)	Bertone 55'; Sanogo (yellow card) 72'; Rochat (yellow card) 74'; Hoarau (yellow card) 80'; Kubo 84'; Obexer (yellow card) 90+1'	Stadium: kybunpark Attendance: 12,890; Referee: (Switzerland) Adrien Jaccottet

30 July 2016 Match 2	Young Boys	1 - 2	Lugano	Bern
20:00 CET	Hoarau 9' (pen.) (yellow card) 42'; Gajić (yellow card) 21'; Ravet (yellow card) 69' von Bergen (yellow card) 85'	(Report)	Golemić (yellow card) 8'; Alioski 55'; Padalino (yellow card) 72' von Bergen 83' (o.g.)	Stadium: Stade de Suisse Wankdorf Bern; Attendance: 14,300; Referee: (Switzerland) Sandro Schärer

6 August 2016 Match 3	Young Boys	4 - 1	Thun	Bern
17:45 CET		(SFL Report)		Stadium: Stade de Suisse Wankdorf Bern; Attendance: 31,120; Referee: (Switzerland) Stephan Klossner

10 August 2016 Round 4	Basel	3 – 0	Young Boys	St. Jakob-Park, Basel
20:30	Traoré (yellow card) 35'; Zuffi 55'; Bjarnason 59'; Vilotić 71' (o.g.)	(SFL Report)	(yellow card) 88' Bertone	Attendance: 29,523; Referee: (Switzerland) Alain Bieri (Solothurn)

20 August 2016 Round 5	Young Boys	7 - 2	Lausanne-Sport	Stade de Suisse Wankdorf Bern, Bern
17:45	Hoarau 2'; Ravet 30'; Schick (yellow card) 33' (goal) 37'; Sutter 49'; Wüthrich (yellow card) 50'; Lecjaks 59'; Kubo 68'; Frey 90+1'	Report	Manière (yellow card) 4'; Campo 40'; Pak Kwang-ryong 76'; Kololli (yellow card) 81'	Attendance: 14,665; Referee: (Switzerland) Fedayi San

28 August 2016 Round 6	Grasshopper Club Zürich	4 - 1	Young Boys	Letzigrund, Zürich
13:45	Munsy 39'; Pnishi (yellow card) 49'; Lavanchy 74'; Sigurjónsson 86'; Caio 90+5' (pen.)	Report	Frey 58' von Bergen (yellow card) 71'; Ravet (yellow card) 90+3'; Duah (yellow card) 90+4'	Attendance: 4,800; Referee: (Switzerland) Stephan Klossner

10 September 2016 Round 7	Young Boys	2 - 1	Luzern	Stade de Suisse Wankdorf Bern, Bern
20:00	Zakaria (yellow card) 13'; Sulejmani 18' 43'	Report	Puljić (yellow card) 59'; Ricardo Costa (yellow card) 75'; Schneuwly 90+3'	Attendance: 16,058; Referee: (Switzerland) Adrien Jaccottet

21 September 2016 Round 8	Vaduz	0 - 0	Young Boys	Rheinpark Stadion, Vaduz
19:45	Grippo (yellow card) 69'; Brunner (yellow card) 84'; Muntwiler (yellow card) 88'	Report	Frey (yellow card) 21'	Attendance: 3,832; Referee: (Switzerland) Lukas Fähndrich

3 December 2016 Round 17	Young Boys	3 – 1	Basel	Stade de Suisse, Bern
20:00	Hoarau 6', 51'; Nuhu (red card) 45'; Mbabu 71'	[ (Report)]	66' (pen.) Delgado	Attendance: 20,216; Referee: (Austria) Harald Lechner

9 April 2017 Round 27	Basel	1 – 1	Young Boys	St. Jakob-Park, Basel
16:00	Xhaka (yellow card) 24'; Elyounoussi 54'; Riveros (yellow card) 75'; Akanji (yellow card) 90'	[ Report]	Ravet 18'; Frey (yellow card) 51'; Assalé (red card) 75'	Attendance: 30,817; Referee: (Switzerland) Alain Bieri (Solothurn)

21 May 2017 Round 34	Young Boys	2 – 1	Basel	Stade de Suisse, Bern
16:00	Assalé 9'; Schick 53'	[(Report)]	3' Doumbia	Attendance: 18,383; Referee: (Switzerland) Sascha Amhof

=== Champions League qualifying rounds ===
==== Matches ====
26 July 2016	Shakhtar Donetsk (Ukraine)	2–0	(Switzerland) Young Boys	Arena Lviv, Lviv
20:45	Bernard 27'; Seleznyov 75'	Report		Attendance: 7,477; Referee: Serdar Gözübüyük (Netherlands)

3 August 2016	Young Boys (Switzerland)	2–0 (a.e.t.) (4–2 p)	(Ukraine) Shakhtar Donetsk	Stade de Suisse, Bern
20:15	Kubo 54', 60'	Report		Attendance: 9,365< Referee: Ruddy Buquet (France)
	Penalties
	Hoarau (penalty scored); Kubo (penalty scored); Hadergjonaj (penalty missed); Rochat (penalty scored); Gajić (penalty scored)		(penalty scored) Srna; (penalty missed) Fred; (penalty missed) Rakitskiy; (penalty scored) Marlos

2–2 on aggregate; Young Boys won on penalties.

Play-off round

16 August 2016	Young Boys (Switzerland)	1–3	(Germany) Borussia Mönchengladbach	Stade de Suisse, Bern
20:45	Sulejmani 56'	Report	Raffael 11'; Hahn 67'; Rochat 69' (o.g.)	Attendance: 30,224; Referee: Nicola Rizzoli (Italy)

24 August 2016	Borussia Mönchengladbach (Germany)	6–1	(Switzerland) Young Boys	Borussia-Park, Mönchengladbach
20:45	Hazard 9', 64', 84'; Raffael 33', 40', 77'	Report	Ravet 79'	Attendance: 43,302; Referee: Andre Marriner (England)

Borussia Mönchengladbach won 9–2 on aggregate.

=== Europa League group stage ===
==== Matches ====
15 September 2016	Young Boys (Switzerland)	0–1	(Greece) Olympiacos	Stade de Suisse, Bern
19:00		Report	Cambiasso 42'	Attendance: 11,132; Referee: Serhiy Boyko (Ukraine)

29 September 2016	Astana (Kazakhstan)	0–0	(Switzerland) Young Boys	Astana Arena, Astana
17:00		Report		Attendance: 21,328; Referee: Simon Lee Evans (Wales)

20 October 2016	Young Boys (Switzerland)	3–1	(Cyprus) APOEL	Stade de Suisse, Bern
21:05	Hoarau 18', 52', 82' (pen.)	Report	Efrem 14'	Attendance: 9,553; Referee: Tobias Welz (Germany)

3 November 2016	APOEL (Cyprus)	1–0	(Switzerland) Young Boys	GSP Stadium, Nicosia
19:00	Sotiriou 69'	Report		Attendance: 12,761; Referee: Sébastien Delferière (Belgium)

24 November 2016	Olympiacos (Greece)	1–1	(Switzerland) Young Boys	Karaiskakis Stadium, Piraeus
21:05	Fortounis 48'	Report	Hoarau 58'	Attendance: 24,131; Referee: Miroslav Zelinka (Czech Republic)

8 December 2016	Young Boys (Switzerland)	3–0	(Kazakhstan) Astana	Stade de Suisse, Bern
19:00	Frey 63'; Hoarau 66'; Schick 71'	Report		Attendance: 7,616; Referee: Clayton Pisani (Malta)

==== Final group table ====
Pos	Team	Pld	W	D	L	GF	GA	GD	Pts	Qualification
1	(Cyprus) APOEL	6	4	0	2	8	6	+2	12	Advance to knockout phase
2	(Greece) Olympiacos	6	2	2	2	7	6	+1	8	Advance to knockout phase
3	(Switzerland) Young Boys	6	2	2	2	7	4	+3	8	
4	(Kazakhstan) Astana	6	1	2	3	5	11	−6	5	

Source: UEFA
Rules for classification: Group stage tiebreakers
