= Mu'nas Dabbur =

Israeli footballer (born 1992)

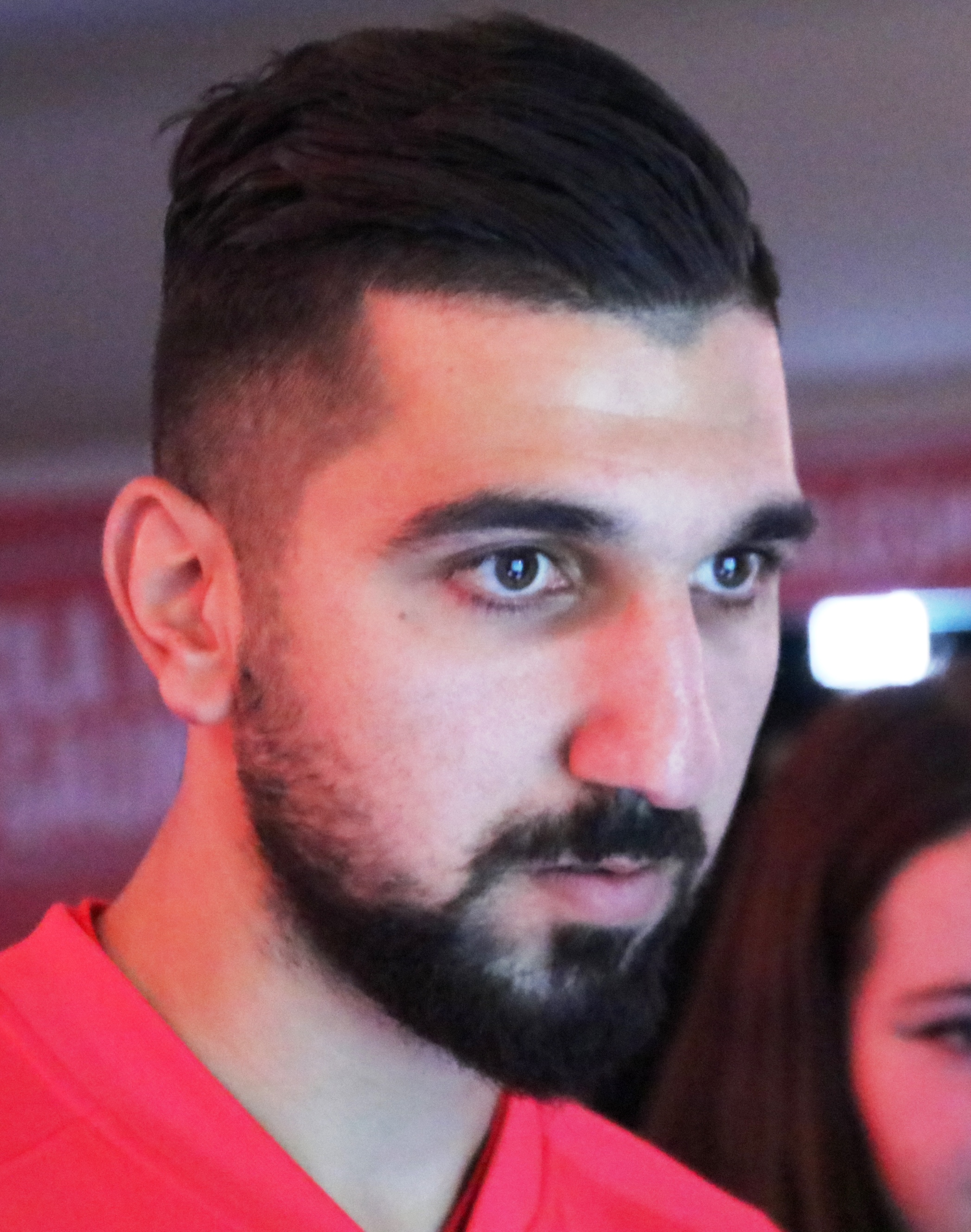
- Dabbur with Red Bull Salzburg in 2018

Personal information
- Date of birth: 14 May 1992 (age 34)
- Place of birth: Nazareth, Israel
- Height: 1.83 m (6 ft 0 in)
- Position: Striker

Youth career
- 2003–2010: Maccabi Nazareth
- 2010–2011: Maccabi Tel Aviv

Senior career*
Years	Team	Apps	(Gls)
2009–2010	Maccabi Ahi Nazareth	5	(0)
2011–2014	Maccabi Tel Aviv	66	(22)
2014–2016	Grasshoppers	82	(41)
2016–2019	Red Bull Salzburg	76	(44)
2017	→ Grasshoppers (loan)	13	(7)
2019–2020	Sevilla	2	(0)
2020–2023	TSG Hoffenheim	84	(17)
2023–2026	Shabab Al Ahli	51	(23)
2026	→ Baniyas (loan)	11	(2)

International career^{‡}
2011	Israel U19	7	(3)
2011–2014	Israel U21	22	(13)
2014–2022	Israel	40	(15)
- * Club domestic league appearances and goals as of 4 July 2025 ‡ National team caps and goals as of 13 June 2022

Mu'nas Dabbur (Arabic: مُؤَنَّس دَبُّور, Hebrew: מואנס דאבור; born 14 May 1992), alternatively spelled as Moanes Dabour or Muanes Dabur, is an Israeli professional footballer who plays as a striker.

A full international from youth to senior level, Dabbur represented Israel at the under-19 and under-21 levels before making his senior debut in 2014. He earned 40 caps and scored 15 goals for Israel before retiring from international football in 2022.

== Early life ==
Dabbur was born in Nazareth, Israel, to an Arab-Muslim family. His brother, Anas Dabbur, is also a footballer who plays as a midfielder. Dabbur's father, Kasam, died in a car accident in 2009.

== Club career ==
Dabbur started his career in the Israeli Maccabi Nazareth and Maccabi Tel Aviv youth academies.

=== Maccabi Tel Aviv ===
He made his senior debut with Israeli Premier League club Maccabi Tel Aviv in 2011. In the 2011–12 season, he participated in 26 league matches for Maccabi, scoring eight goals.

In the 2012–13 Israeli Premier League season, he was part of Maccabi Tel Aviv's squad that has become champions after a ten-year drought spell, providing the team with 10 goals in 26 matches. His efforts were instrumental in securing the Israeli League Championship, marking the team's first title in a decade. Dabbur started the season providing two important goals on 27 August 2011 against Maccabi Haifa, goals that were described as "extremely crucial" for the rest of the season in the tight race for achieving the title.

Dabbur ended the season after being injured for a one-month period during the warm up to the derby match against Hapoel Tel Aviv on 6 April 2013.

=== Grasshoppers ===
On 4 February 2014, Dabbur confirmed his transfer to the Swiss Super League after its club Grasshoppers paid a transfer fee of $425,000 to his previous Israeli club Maccabi Tel Aviv. On 16 February 2014, he had his first appearance at Zurich, when he came on from the bench in the second half scoring two goals and assisting once in a 5–1 win against St. Gallen. Dabbur finished his debut season at Grasshoppers with nine goals and four assists in 15 league matches.

The 2014–15 season was comparatively less successful with Dabbur scoring 13 times in the league and five in the cup. He also provided 8 assists in the league, reaffirming his position as one of Grasshoppers' best and most valuable players.

During the summer of 2015, several clubs were rumoured to be interested in Dabbur, including German club Werder Bremen and Italian club Palermo. However, the only two clubs to bid for him were the aforementioned Palermo and his previous Israeli club Maccabi Tel Aviv. Both bids were rejected and Dabbur signed a new, greatly improved contract with Swiss club Grasshoppers.

Dabbur enjoyed a good start to the 2015–16 Swiss Super League season, scoring eight and assisting eight goals in his club's first eight games including a goal and a hat-trick of assists in Grasshoppers' opening game against Thun.

=== Red Bull Salzburg ===
In May 2016, Dabbur signed with Austrian Bundesliga club Red Bull Salzburg for five years. During the 2017–18 season, Salzburg finished top of their Europa League group, for a record fourth time, before beating Real Sociedad and Borussia Dortmund thus making their first ever appearance in the UEFA Europa League semi-final. On 3 May 2018, he played in the Europa League semi-finals as Olympique de Marseille played out a 2–1 away loss but a 3–2 aggregate win to secure a place in the 2018 UEFA Europa League Final.

In February 2017, Dabbur was loaned mid-season back to his previous Swiss club of Grasshoppers, until the end of the season.

=== Sevilla ===
On 17 January 2019, Dabbur agreed terms to join Spanish La Liga club Sevilla. He agreed to a four-year contract, but stayed with his previous Austrian Bundesliga club Red Bull Salzburg until the end of the campaign. Dabbur made his debut with Sevilla during the 2019–20 La Liga matchweek 16, coming on as a substitute for Óliver Torres in the 78th minute, in a 1–1 tie at Osasuna.

=== TSG Hoffenheim ===
On 7 January 2020, it was announced that Dabbur had moved to Germany and signed a contract with top-tier Bundesliga club TSG Hoffenheim on a four-year contract, running until 2024, for a reported fee of €12 million.

=== Shabab Al-Ahli ===
On 12 July 2023, Emirati club Shabab Al-Ahli announced the signing of Dabbur from Hoffenheim, for a reported fee of €1.5 million.

=== Baniyas ===
On 25 January 2026, Dabbur joined Baniyas on a six-month loan.

== International career ==
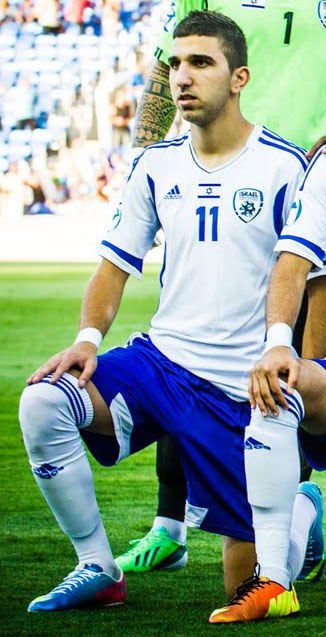
Dabbur with Israel U-21 during the 2013 UEFA European Under-21 Championship

In 2013, Dabbur was part of the Israel U-21 national team that played in the 2013 UEFA European Under-21 Championship that was hosted in Israel. Dabbur started in two out of three matches during the group stage of the tournament, against the U21 national teams of England and Italy. That same year, Dabbur expressed his pride in representing the national team, saying: "It’s a great honor for me to represent Israel. I always felt that I was proud to be invited to the team, and I want it to continue."

In May 2014, Dabbur was called up by coach Eli Guttman in the senior Israel national football team 25-man squad to play two friendlies against Mexico and Honduras. He made his senior debut against Honduras in a 4–2 victory on 1 June 2014. He scored his first goal for the national team against Andorra in a 4–0 victory on 3 September 2015, in UEFA Euro 2016 qualification.

On 26 July 2022, Dabbur announced his retirement from international football, ending an eight-year international career with 40 appearances made.

== Career statistics ==
=== Club ===
As of match played 25 May 2025

Appearances and goals by club, season and competition
Club	Season	League			National cup (Note: Includes Israel State Cup, Swiss Cup, Austrian Cup, Copa del Rey, DFB-Pokal, UAE President's Cup)		League cup (Note: Includes Toto Cup, UAE League Cup)		Continental		Other		Total	
Club	Season	Division	Apps	Goals	Apps	Goals	Apps	Goals	Apps	Goals	Apps	Goals	Apps	Goals
Maccabi Ahi Nazareth	2009–10	Israeli Premier League	5	0	0	0	0	0	—		—		5	0
Maccabi Tel Aviv	2011–12	Israeli Premier League	26	8	1	0	2	1	7 (Note: Appearances in UEFA Europa League)	1	—		36	10
Maccabi Tel Aviv	2012–13	Israeli Premier League	26	10	1	0	5	0	—		—		32	10
Maccabi Tel Aviv	2013–14	Israeli Premier League	14	4	1	0	0	0	5	0	—		20	4
Maccabi Tel Aviv	Total		66	22	3	0	7	1	12	1	—		88	24
Grasshoppers	2013–14	Swiss Super League	15	9	0	0	—		0	0	—		15	9
Grasshoppers	2014–15	Swiss Super League	32	13	3	3	—		4 (Note: Two appearances in UEFA Champions League, two appearances in UEFA Europa League)	0	—		39	16
Grasshoppers	2015–16	Swiss Super League	35	19	2	3	—		—		—		37	22
Grasshoppers	Total		82	41	5	6	—		4	0	—		91	47
Red Bull Salzburg	2016–17	Austrian Bundesliga	15	2	2	3	—		8 (Note: Four appearances in UEFA Champions League, four appearances and one goal in UEFA Europa League)	1	—		25	6
Red Bull Salzburg	2017–18	Austrian Bundesliga	32	22	3	0	—		20 (Note: Four appearances in UEFA Champions League, sixteen appearances and seven goals in UEFA Europa League)	7	—		55	29
Red Bull Salzburg	2018–19	Austrian Bundesliga	29	20	5	5	—		14 (Note: Four appearances and four goals in UEFA Champions League, ten appearances and eight goals in UEFA Europa League)	12	—		48	37
Red Bull Salzburg	Total		76	44	10	8	—		42	20	—		128	72
Grasshoppers (loan)	2016–17	Swiss Super League	13	7	0	0	—		0	0	—		13	7
Sevilla	2019–20	La Liga	2	0	1	0	—		6	3	—		9	3
TSG Hoffenheim	2019–20	Bundesliga	14	4	1	2	—		—		—		15	6
TSG Hoffenheim	2020–21	Bundesliga	22	4	1	0	—		7	6	—		30	10
TSG Hoffenheim	2021–22	Bundesliga	27	3	3	2	—		—		—		30	5
TSG Hoffenheim	2022–23	Bundesliga	21	6	3	2	—		—		—		24	8
TSG Hoffenheim	Total		84	17	8	6	—		7	6	—		99	29
Shabab Al Ahli	2023–24	UAE Pro League	21	14	3	0	1	0	2 (Note: Appearances in AFC Champions League)	1	—		27	15
Shabab Al Ahli	2024–25	UAE Pro League	24	8	4	1	7	3	10 (Note: One appearance in AFC Champions League Elite, nine appearances and three goals in AFC Champions League Two)	3	1 (Note: Appearance in UAE Super Cup)	0	46	15
Shabab Al Ahli	Total		45	22	7	1	8	3	12	4	1	0	73	30
Career total			373	153	34	21	15	4	83	34	1	0	506	212

=== International ===
Scores and results list Israel's goal tally first, score column indicates score after each Dabbur goal.

List of international goals scored by Mu'nas Dabbur
No.	Date	Venue	Opponent	Score	Result	Competition
1	3 September 2015	Sammy Ofer Stadium, Haifa, Israel	Andorra	4–0	4–0	UEFA Euro 2016 qualification
2	15 November 2018	Netanya Stadium, Netanya, Israel	Guatemala	3–0	7–0	Friendly
3	15 November 2018	Netanya Stadium, Netanya, Israel	Guatemala	4–0	7–0	Friendly
4	24 March 2019	Sammy Ofer Stadium, Haifa, Israel	Austria	4–1	4–2	UEFA Euro 2020 qualification
5	15 October 2019	Turner Stadium, Be'er Sheva, Israel	Latvia	1–0	3–1	UEFA Euro 2020 qualification
6	15 October 2019	Turner Stadium, Be'er Sheva, Israel	Latvia	3–1	3–1	UEFA Euro 2020 qualification
7	16 November 2019	Teddy Stadium, Jerusalem, Israel	Poland	1–2	1–2	UEFA Euro 2020 qualification
8	31 March 2021	Zimbru Stadium, Chișinău, Moldova	Moldova	4–1	4–1	2022 FIFA World Cup qualification – UEFA
9	1 September 2021	Tórsvøllur, Tórshavn, Faroe Islands	Faroe Islands	3–0	4–0	2022 FIFA World Cup qualification – UEFA
10	4 September 2021	Sammy Ofer Stadium, Haifa, Israel	Austria	2–0	5–2	2022 FIFA World Cup qualification – UEFA
11	9 October 2021	Hampden Park, Glasgow, Scotland	Scotland	2–1	2–3	2022 FIFA World Cup qualification – UEFA
12	12 October 2021	Turner Stadium, Be'er Sheva, Israel	Moldova	2–0	2–1	2022 FIFA World Cup qualification – UEFA
13	15 November 2021	Netanya Stadium, Netanya, Israel	Faroe Islands	1–0	3–2	2022 FIFA World Cup qualification – UEFA
14	29 March 2022	Netanya Stadium, Netanya, Israel	Romania	1–2	2–2	Friendly
15	29 March 2022	Netanya Stadium, Netanya, Israel	Romania	2–2	2–2	Friendly

== Honours ==
Maccabi Tel Aviv

- Israeli Premier League: 2012–13

Red Bull Salzburg

- Austrian Bundesliga: 2016–17, 2017–18, 2018–19
- Austrian Cup: 2018–19

Sevilla

- UEFA Europa League: 2019–20

Shabab Al Ahli Club

- UAE Pro League: 2024–25
- UAE President's Cup: 2024–25
- UAE Super Cup: 2024

Individual

- Swiss Super League Top scorer: 2015–16
- Swiss Super League Top assist provider: 2015–16
- Swiss Super League Goal of the Year: 2015–16
- Swiss Super League Team of the Year: 2015–16
- Austrian Bundesliga Top scorer: 2017–18, 2018–19
- Austrian Bundesliga Player of the Year: 2018–19
- Austrian Bundesliga Team of the Year: 2017–18, 2018–19
- Austrian Cup Top assist provider: 2016–17

== See also ==
- List of Israeli football players in foreign leagues
