= Yoric Ravet =

French footballer (born 1989)

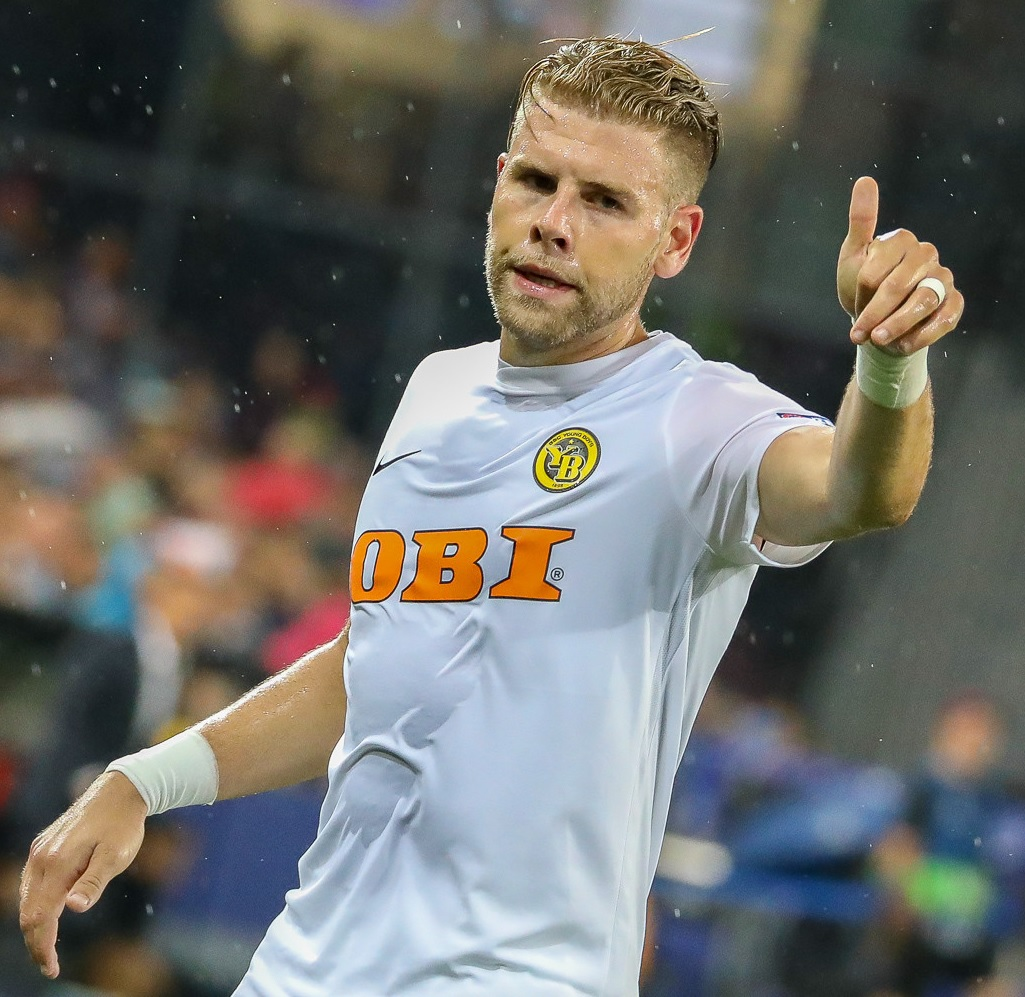
- Ravet with Young Boys in 2017

Personal information
- Date of birth: 12 September 1989 (age 37)
- Place of birth: Échirolles, France
- Height: 1.78 m (5 ft 10 in)
- Position: Winger

Team information
- Current team: FC Allobroges Asafia

Youth career
- Grenoble

Senior career*
Years	Team	Apps	(Gls)
2008–2011	Grenoble	46	(5)
2011–2013	Saint-Étienne	3	(0)
2012–2013	→ Angers (loan)	29	(3)
2013–2014	Lausanne-Sport	29	(8)
2014–2016	Grasshoppers	53	(16)
2016–2017	Young Boys	54	(12)
2017–2020	SC Freiburg	14	(0)
2019	→ Grasshoppers (loan)	14	(1)
2020–2022	Grenoble	53	(10)
2022–2024	ES Manival		
2024–	FC Allobroges Asafia		

International career
2009	France U20	3	(0)
- * Club domestic league appearances and goals as of 9 July 2024

Yoric Ravet (born 12 September 1989) is a French professional footballer who plays as a winger for FC Allobroges Asafia.

== Club career ==
Since childhood, Ravet was with Grenoble, growing up in nearby Échirolles. He primarily played in the reserves before being promoted to the senior squad for the 2008–09 season. He was given the number 33 shirt and proceeded to make his professional football debut on the opening match day of the season against Sochaux, coming on as a substitute in the 82nd minute. He played eight minutes in the match and picked up a yellow card. He went on to make two more league appearances, as well an appearance in the Coupe de la Ligue.

On 15 June 2012, Ravet joined Ligue 2 side Angers on a season-long loan deal.

On 29 July 2013, Ravet signed a two-year deal with Swiss side Lausanne-Sport.

On 29 August 2017, Ravet joined Bundesliga side SC Freiburg. The transfer fee paid to Young Boys was reported as €4.5 million.

In February 2019, he joined Grasshoppers on loan until the end of the season.

== International career ==
On 25 May 2009, Ravet was selected to the under-20 squad to participate in the 2009 Mediterranean Games.

== Career statistics ==
As of 18 June 2019

Appearances and goals by club, season and competition
Club	Season	League			National cup		League cup		Europe		Total	
Club	Season	Division	Apps	Goals	Apps	Goals	Apps	Goals	Apps	Goals	Apps	Goals
Grenoble	2008–09	Ligue 1	11	0	0	0	0	0	—		11	0
Grenoble	2009–10	Ligue 1	16	2	1	0	0	0	—		17	2
Grenoble	2010–11	Ligue 2	19	3	1	0	0	0	—		20	3
Grenoble	Total		46	5	2	0	0	0	0	0	48	5
Saint-Étienne II	2010–11	CFA	6	4	—		—		—		6	4
Saint-Étienne II	2011–12	CFA	17	7	—		—		—		17	7
Saint-Étienne II	Total		23	11	—		—		—		23	11
Saint-Étienne	2010–11	Ligue 1	2	0	0	0	0	0	—		2	0
Saint-Étienne	2011–12	Ligue 1	1	0	1	0	0	0	—		2	0
Saint-Étienne	Total		3	0	1	0	0	0	—		4	0
Angers II (loan)	2012–13	CFA 2	1	2	—		—		—		1	2
Angers (loan)	2012–13	Ligue 2	29	3	0	0	2	0	—		31	3
Lausanne-Sport	2013–14	Swiss Super League	29	8	3	1	—		—		32	9
Grasshoppers	2014–15	Swiss Super League	35	8	3	2	—		4 (Note: Two appearances in the Champions League and two in the Europa League)	0	42	10
Grasshoppers	2015–16	Swiss Super League	18	8	1	0	—		—		19	8
Grasshoppers	Total		53	16	4	2	—		4	0	61	18
Young Boys	2015–16	Swiss Super League	18	5	—		—		—		18	5
Young Boys	2016–17	Swiss Super League	32	6	3	2	—		8 (Note: Four appearances and a goal in the Champions League, four appearances in the Europa League)	1	43	9
Young Boys	2017–18	Swiss Super League	4	1	0	0	—		4 (Note: Appearances in the Champions League)	0	8	1
Young Boys	Total		54	12	3	2	—		12	1	69	15
SC Freiburg	2017–18	Bundesliga	10	0	2	1	—		0	0	11	1
SC Freiburg	2018–19	Bundesliga	4	0	1	0	—		0	0	5	0
SC Freiburg	Total		14	0	3	1	—		0	0	16	11
Grasshoppers (loan)	2018–19	Swiss Super League	14	1	0	0	—		0	0	14	1
Career total			266	58	16	6	2	0	16	1	299	65

== Honours ==
Individual

- Swiss Super League Top assists provider: 2016–17
