= List of Israeli football players in foreign leagues =

This list is about Israeli footballers that play in international clubs.

== Players ==
For the current national team squad, see Israel national football team#Current squad.

Israeli footballers in an international club (Ligioners)
No.	Name	Position	League	Club	Shirt number
1	Bibras Natcho	MF	Serbian Superliga	FK Partizan	6
2	Lior Refaelov	MF	Belgian Pro League	Club Brugge KV	8
3	Rami Gershon	DF	Belgian Pro League	K.A.A. Gent	55
4	Kenny Hasan Sayef	MF	Belgian Pro League	K.A.A. Gent	15
5	Hatem Abd Elhamed	DF	Belgian Pro League	K.A.A. Gent	16
6	Ofir Martziano	GK	Belgian Pro League	Royal Mouscron-Péruwelz	1
7	Omer Damari	FW	Austrian Football Bundesliga	FC Red Bull Salzburg	16
8	Almog Cohen	MF	Bundesliga	FC Ingolstadt 04	36
9	Sheran Yeini	MF	Eredivisie	Vitesse Arnhem	6
10	Nir Bitton	MF	Scottish Premiership	Celtic F.C.	6
11	Moanes Dabour	FW	UAE Pro League	Shabab Al Ahli Club	9
12	Tomer Hemed	FW	Football League Championship	Brighton & Hove Albion F.C.	10
13	Beram Kayal	MF	Football League Championship	Brighton & Hove Albion F.C.	7
14	Roi Kahat	MF	Austrian Football Bundesliga	FK Austria Wien	19
15	Mohammad Ghadir	FW	Belgian Pro League	K.S.C. Lokeren Oost-Vlaanderen	11
16	Idan Vered	MF	Serbian SuperLiga	Red Star Belgrade	11
17	Lotem Zino	MF	Swiss Super League	FC Thun	15
18	Sintayehu Sallalich	MF	Slovenian PrvaLiga	NK Maribor	8
19	Marwan Kabha	MF	Slovenian PrvaLiga	NK Maribor	24
20	Gal Shish	DF	Ukrainian Premier League	FC Volyn Lutsk	16
21	Gal Harel	MF	Segunda División	Gimnàstic de Tarragona	18
22	Hasan Abu Zaid	MF	Russian Football National League	FC Torpedo Armavir	21
23	Toto Tamuz	FW	Liga I	FC Petrolul Ploiești	99
24	Eyal Golasa	MF	Super League Greece	PAOK FC	7
25	Orr Barouch	FW	Swiss Challenge League	FC Biel-Bienne	27

Key
GK	Goalkeeper
DF	Defender
MF	Midfielder
FW	Forward
