= Miralem Sulejmani =

Serbian footballer

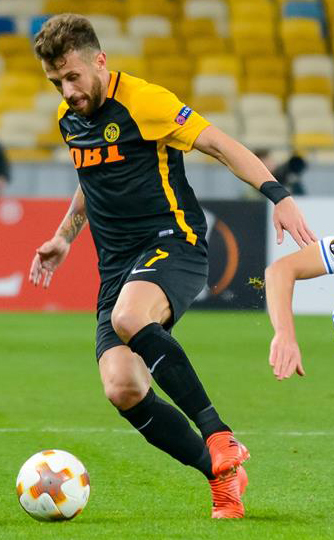
- Sulejmani with Young Boys in 2017

Personal information
- Date of birth: 5 December 1988 (age 37)
- Place of birth: Belgrade, SR Serbia, Yugoslavia
- Height: 1.78 m (5 ft 10 in)
- Position: Winger

Youth career
- BSK Batajnica
- 2000–2005: Partizan

Senior career*
| Years | Team | Apps | (Gls) |
| 2005–2006 | Partizan | 1 | (0) |
| 2007–2008 | Heerenveen | 34 | (14) |
| 2008–2013 | Ajax | 103 | (29) |
| 2013–2015 | Benfica | 15 | (1) |
| 2015–2022 | Young Boys | 166 | (39) |
| 2024 | Železničar Inđija | | |
| Total | | 319 | (83) |

International career
| 2007–2010 | Serbia U21 | 19 | (6) |
| 2008–2016 | Serbia | 20 | (1) |
- * Club domestic league appearances and goals

Miralem Sulejmani (Serbian Cyrillic: Миралем Сулејмани, pronounced [mirǎlem sulejmâːni]; born 5 December 1988) is a Serbian former professional footballer who played as a winger.

When he signed for Ajax in 2008, he became the most expensive football player to have ever been purchased by a Dutch club. Over the course of seven seasons he amassed Eredivisie totals of 137 games and 44 goals. In 2013, he moved to Benfica where he sparsely played, but won five major titles in two years. He then moved to Young Boys, where he became a first team regular again.

== Club career ==
=== Partizan ===
His first club was local FK BSK Batajnica, before he moved to FK Partizan at the age of 11 to complete his formation.

Sulejmani made his first appearance for the seniors in the 2005–06 season, aged 17, and quickly drew interest from Dutch clubs AZ Alkmaar, FC Groningen and SC Heerenveen; additionally, he also spent time at farm team FK Teleoptik.

=== Heerenveen ===
On 6 December 2006 Sulejmani signed for Heerenveen with the transfer being made effective in January of the following year. The move was controversial, with several arguments occurring between the Dutch side and his agent. Eventually Partizan, after a meeting with the Football Association of Serbia, suspended the player until 11 May 2007, keeping him out for the rest of the season; Heerenveen appealed to FIFA afterwards and, although the original verdict claimed that he should not be suspended, a second look at the case was made and he was banned again.

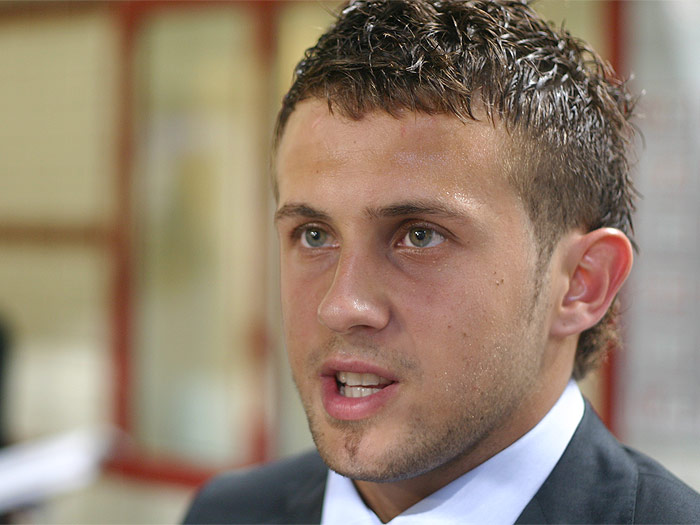
Sulejmani as a Heerenveen player.

Sulejmani made his official debut with the Friesland team in the 2007–08 campaign, against Willem II on 17 August 2007 (0–0 draw). He scored his first Eredivisie goal the following match, but his team lost 1–4 at AFC Ajax; profiting from the departure of Afonso Alves to Middlesbrough in January 2008, he finished the campaign with 15 goals to rank joint-fifth in the scoring charts, helping his team to the fifth position and the subsequent qualification to the UEFA Cup.

=== Ajax ===
After weeks of speculation, AFC Ajax announced that it had reached an agreement for the transfer of Sulejmani. The Amsterdam club paid €16.25 million to Heerenveen, breaking the Dutch transfer-record which dated from 2005 when Klaas-Jan Huntelaar had also transferred from Heerenveen to Ajax. The player signed a five-year contract, stating "I am a footballer and I only want to think about football".

Sulejmani netted ten official goals in his first year with Ajax, including two in seven contests in the campaign's UEFA Cup as the club reached the round-of-16. On 18 February 2010, for the same competition, he scored after a marvellous individual play in a 1–2 home loss to Juventus, also the final round-of-32 aggregate score.

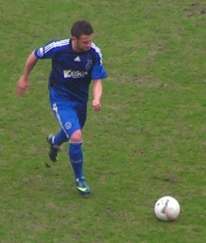
Sulejmani taking a free kick with Ajax.

On 11 August 2010, West Ham United confirmed that they had agreed terms with Ajax and Sulejmani to take him on a year-long loan subject to the granting of a work permit, which was denied the following day. He continued to display solidly in the following two seasons, scoring 19 goals in 54 appearances combined en route to back-to-back national championships.

On 4 March 2012, in a match against Roda JC, Sulejmani was seriously injured after 30 minutes. Two days later the Ajax medical team has determined that he would have to undergo surgery to the meniscus, going on to miss the rest of the season. In February of the following year, it was reported that he was set to join S.L. Benfica as a free agent; after this was confirmed, coach Frank de Boer demoted him to the reserves, where he remained until the end of his tenure.

=== Benfica ===
Several days after the initial reports of the deal with Benfica appeared, it was finally confirmed that Sulejmani, along with countryman Filip Đuričić, passed medical tests and agreed to a five-year contract effective as of July 2013. Legendary Predrag Mijatović praised his countryman's abilities.

Sulejmani made his Primeira Liga debut on 25 August, coming in midway through the second half of a 2–1 home win against Gil Vicente FC. He scored his first official goal for his new club on 15 December, netting the 3–2 winner at S.C. Olhanense and again featuring as a substitute.

On 30 December 2014, seven months later after his injury in the Europa League final, Sulejmani made his comeback, as a substitute, against Nacional in the third round of league cup.

=== Young Boys ===
On 9 June 2015, Benfica announced that Sulejmani had joined Swiss club Young Boys.

He was part of the Young Boys squad that won the 2017–18 Swiss Super League, their first league title in 32 years. Sulejmani left Young Boys after the 2021–22 Swiss Super League season ended.

=== Železničar Inđija ===
After a year and a half without club, on 18 January 2024, Sulejmani joined Serbian third division club Železničar Inđija.

== International career ==
Sulejmani was named in Zvonko Živković's 18-man squad for the 2007 UEFA European Under-19 Championship. On 7 September 2008 he converted two penalties for the under-21s in their 8–0 demolition of Hungary in a qualifying match for the 2009 European Championships.

Sulejmani made his debut for the senior team on 6 February 2008, in a friendly with Macedonia in Skopje. He netted his first international goal on 12 September 2012, against Wales for the 2014 FIFA World Cup qualifiers (6–1 win). He earned a total of 20 caps (1 goal), and his final international was a March 2016 friendly match away against Estonia.

== Personal life ==
Sulejmani's father Miljaim is an ethnic Gorani whose family moved from Gora in southern Kosovo to Batajnica neighbourhood of Belgrade in 1948. His father Miljaim also played football, for OFK Beograd and GSP Polet. Miralem's mother Silvija is a Serb born in Zagreb, Croatia.

Sulejmani is close friends with Danko Lazović, a fellow professional footballer who also spent much of his career in the Dutch top flight; Sulejmani notably played for AFC Ajax, whereas Lazović played for their rivals Feyenoord and PSV Eindhoven. In 2010, he met his girlfriend Vesna Mušović. He became a father to a son in October 2011.

== Career statistics ==
=== Club ===
As of 22 May 2022

Appearances and goals by club, season and competition
| Club | Season | League | | | National Cup | | Europe | | Other | | Total | |
| Club | Season | Division | Apps | Goals | Apps | Goals | Apps | Goals | Apps | Goals | Apps | Goals |
|---|---|---|---|---|---|---|---|---|---|---|---|---|
| Partizan | 2005–06 | Serbia and Montenegro SuperLiga | 1 | 0 | 0 | 0 | 0 | 0 | — | | 1 | 0 |
| Heerenveen | 2006–07 | Eredivisie | 0 | 0 | 0 | 0 | 0 | 0 | — | | 0 | 0 |
| Heerenveen | 2007–08 | Eredivisie | 34 | 14 | 2 | 1 | 2 | 0 | 0 | 0 | 38 | 15 |
| Heerenveen | Total | | 34 | 14 | 2 | 1 | 2 | 0 | — | | 38 | 15 |
| Ajax | 2008–09 | Eredivisie | 27 | 8 | 0 | 0 | 7 | 2 | — | | 34 | 10 |
| Ajax | 2009–10 | Eredivisie | 17 | 2 | 4 | 0 | 10 | 1 | — | | 31 | 3 |
| Ajax | 2010–11 | Eredivisie | 32 | 8 | 6 | 3 | 14 | 2 | 1 (Note: Appearance in Johan Cruyff Shield) | 0 | 53 | 13 |
| Ajax | 2011–12 | Eredivisie | 22 | 11 | 1 | 0 | 8 | 1 | 1 | 0 | 32 | 12 |
| Ajax | 2012–13 | Eredivisie | 5 | 0 | 2 | 0 | 1 | 0 | 0 | 0 | 8 | 0 |
| Ajax | Total | | 103 | 29 | 13 | 3 | 40 | 6 | 2 | 0 | 158 | 38 |
| Benfica | 2013–14 | Primeira Liga | 11 | 1 | 2 | 1 | 10 | 0 | 3 (Note: Appearances in Taça da Liga) | 1 | 26 | 3 |
| Benfica | 2014–15 | Primeira Liga | 4 | 0 | 0 | 0 | 0 | 0 | 4 | 0 | 8 | 0 |
| Benfica | Total | | 15 | 1 | 2 | 1 | 10 | 0 | 7 | 1 | 34 | 3 |
| Young Boys | 2015–16 | Swiss Super League | 31 | 8 | 3 | 0 | 4 | 0 | — | | 38 | 8 |
| Young Boys | 2016–17 | Swiss Super League | 27 | 8 | 1 | 0 | 7 | 1 | — | | 35 | 9 |
| Young Boys | 2017–18 | Swiss Super League | 32 | 11 | 4 | 2 | 8 | 0 | — | | 44 | 13 |
| Young Boys | 2018–19 | Swiss Super League | 17 | 7 | 3 | 2 | 7 | 0 | — | | 27 | 9 |
| Young Boys | 2019–20 | Swiss Super League | 15 | 4 | 3 | 0 | 1 | 0 | — | | 19 | 4 |
| Young Boys | 2020–21 | Swiss Super League | 28 | 0 | 1 | 0 | 8 | 2 | — | | 37 | 2 |
| Young Boys | 2021–22 | Swiss Super League | 16 | 1 | 2 | 1 | 1 | 0 | — | | 19 | 2 |
| Young Boys | Total | | 166 | 39 | 17 | 5 | 36 | 3 | — | | 219 | 47 |
| Career total | | | 319 | 83 | 34 | 10 | 88 | 9 | 9 | 1 | 450 | 103 |

=== International ===
As of 29 March 2016

Appearances and goals by national team and year
| National team | Year | Apps | Goals |
|---|---|---|---|
| Serbia | 2008 | 3 | 0 |
| Serbia | 2009 | 3 | 0 |
| Serbia | 2010 | 1 | 0 |
| Serbia | 2011 | 0 | 0 |
| Serbia | 2012 | 5 | 1 |
| Serbia | 2013 | 3 | 0 |
| Serbia | 2014 | 1 | 0 |
| Serbia | 2015 | 2 | 0 |
| Serbia | 2016 | 2 | 0 |
| Total | | 20 | 1 |

Scores and results list Serbia's goal tally first, score column indicates score after each Sulejmani goal.

List of international goals scored by Miralem Sulejmani
| No. | Date | Venue | Opponent | Score | Result | Competition |
|---|---|---|---|---|---|---|
| 1 | 11 September 2012 | Karađorđe Stadium, Novi Sad, Serbia | Wales | 6–1 | 6–1 | 2014 World Cup qualification |

== Honours ==
Ajax

- Eredivisie: 2010–11, 2011–12, 2012–13
- KNVB Cup: 2009–10

Benfica

- Primeira Liga: 2013–14, 2014–15
- Taça de Portugal: 2013–14
- Taça da Liga: 2013–14, 2014–15
- UEFA Europa League: Runner-up 2013–14

Young Boys

- Swiss Super League: 2017–18, 2018–19, 2019–20, 2020–21
- Swiss Cup: 2019–20

Individual

- Johan Cruyff Trophy: 2008
- Swiss Cup Top assist provider: 2017–18
- Swiss Super League Team of the Year: 2017–18, 2018–19,
