= Davide Callà =

Swiss footballer (born 1984)

Personal information
- Date of birth: 6 October 1984 (age 42)
- Place of birth: Winterthur, Switzerland
- Height: 1.74 m (5 ft 9 in)
- Position: Midfielder

Team information
- Current team: Switzerland (assistant coach)

Senior career*
Years	Team	Apps	(Gls)
2002	Frauenfeld	16	(3)
2003–2004	Wil	41	(4)
2004	Servette	15	(1)
2005–2008	St. Gallen	67	(8)
2008–2012	Grasshopper	54	(11)
2012–2014	Aarau	51	(25)
2014–2018	Basel	95	(19)
2018–2021	Winterthur	73	(15)

International career
2004–2006	Switzerland U21	21	(3)

Managerial career
- 2021–2022: Winterthur (assistant)
- 2022–2025: Basel (assistant)
- 2025–: Switzerland (assistant)
- * Club domestic league appearances and goals

Davide Callà (born 6 October 1984) is a Swiss professional football coach and a former player who played as midfielder. He is currently the assistant coach of the Switzerland national team.

== Club career ==
On 11 February 2014, FC Basel announced that they had signed Callà in a swap deal with FC Aarau. Stephan Andrist signed for Aarau with a contract dated until June 2015 and at the same time Callà signed for Basel on a 2 1/2-year deal. He made his debut for Basel in the St. Jakob-Park on 15 February 2014 in the 1–0 home win against Sion.

At the end of the 2013–14 Super League season he won the league championship with Basel. They also reached the final of the 2013–14 Swiss Cup, but were beaten 2–0 by Zürich after extra time. Basel had qualified for Europa League knockout phase and here they advanced as far as the quarter-finals.

The season 2014–15 was a very successful one for Callà and for FC Basel. The championship was won for the sixth time in a row that season and in the 2014–15 Swiss Cup they reached the final. But for the third season in a row, Basel ended the competition as runners-up, losing 0–3 to FC Sion in the final. Basel entered the Champions League in the group stage and reached the knockout phase as on 9 December 2014 they managed a 1–1 draw at Anfield against Liverpool. But then Basel then lost to Porto in the Round of 16. Basel played a total of 65 matches (36 Swiss League fixtures, 6 Swiss Cup, 8 Champions League and 15 test matches). Under new manager Paulo Sousa Callà totaled 49 appearances, 23 (seven goals) in the League, 6 in the Cup and 5 in the Champions League, as well 15 in test games (one goal).

Under trainer Urs Fischer Callà won the Swiss Super League championship at the end of the 2015–16 Super League season and at the end of the 2016–17 Super League season for the fourth time. For the club this was the eighth title in a row and their 20th championship title in total. They also won the Swiss Cup for the twelfth time, which meant they had won the double for the sixth time in the club's history.

== Honours ==
Basel

- Swiss Super League: 2013–14, 2014–15, 2015–16, 2016–17
- Swiss Cup winner: 2016–17
- Swiss Cup runner up: 2013–14, 2014–15
