= Gianluca Frontino =

Swiss footballer (born 1989)

Personal information
- Full name: Gianluca Frontino
- Date of birth: 29 November 1989 (age 36)
- Place of birth: Schaffhausen, Switzerland
- Height: 1.75 m (5 ft 9 in)
- Position: Midfielder

Team information
- Current team: FC St. Gallen U-19 (manager)

Youth career
- 1998–2002: FC Schaffhausen
- 2002: Grasshopper
- 2002–2003: FC Schaffhausen
- 2003–2006: Grasshopper

Senior career*
Years	Team	Apps	(Gls)
2006–2007	Grasshopper U-21	25	(7)
2007–2009	Grasshopper	?	
2008–2009	→ Lecce (loan)	0	(0)
2009–2010	FC Schaffhausen	20	(0)
2010–2011	SV Schaffhausen	20	(24)
2011–2014	FC Schaffhausen	74	(69)
2014–2017	FC Thun	39	(6)
2016–2017	→ FC Schaffhausen (loan)	36	(8)
2017	→ FC Winterthur (loan)	13	(3)
2017	FC Winterthur	5	(1)
2017–2019	FC Aarau	38	(12)
2019–2021	FC Diessenhofen	0	(0)

International career
2007–2008	Switzerland U-19	4	(1)

Managerial career
- 2019–2021: FC Diessenhofen (player-manager)
- 2021–2022: SV Schaffhausen
- 2022–2023: FC Wil 1900 (Assistant manager)
- 2023–2024: FC Zürich (Trainer scout)
- 2023–2024: FC Zürich (Caretaker)
- 2024–2025: SC Kriens
- 2025–: FC St. Gallen U-19
- * Club domestic league appearances and goals as of 21:32, 23 July 2019 (UTC)

Gianluca Frontino (born 29 November 1989) is a Swiss football manager and former midfielder who currently manager for FC St. Gallen U-19 from 2025–26.

== Career ==
At the age of only 29, Frontino was appointed as a playing manager for FC Diessenhofen from the 2019/20 season.

Frontino was appointment manager of FC St. Gallen U-19 from 2025–26 season.

== Personal life ==
Frontino was born in Switzerland. He is Italian descent.
