= Diego Ciccone =

Swiss footballer (born 1987)

Personal information
- Date of birth: 21 July 1987 (age 39)
- Place of birth: Winterthur, Switzerland
- Height: 1.73 m (5 ft 8 in)
- Position: Midfielder

Team information
- Current team: SC Veltheim

Youth career
- FC Tössfeld
- FC Wil

Senior career*
Years	Team	Apps	(Gls)
2006–2010	St. Gallen	75	(5)
2010–2018	Vaduz	213	(10)
2018–2019	Rapperswil-Jona	15	(0)
2019	Young Fellows Juventus	15	(0)
2019–	SC Veltheim		
- * Club domestic league appearances and goals as of 22:51, 15 January 2020 (UTC)

Diego Ciccone (born 21 July 1987) is a Swiss professional footballer who plays as a midfielder for SC Veltheim.

== Career ==
During his senior career Ciccone has played in the Swiss football league system representing two clubs, St. Gallen and Vaduz, and also Liechtenstein Football Cup with Vaduz. Ciccone has won the Swiss second tier, Swiss Challenge League, twice (once with St. Gallen in 2009 and once with Vaduz in 2014) and the Liechtenstein Football Cup four times with Vaduz (2011, 2013, 2014 and 2015).

On 2 July 2015, Ciccone scored the final goal in the first leg of 2015–16 UEFA Europa League first qualifying round in a 5–0 win against San Marinese La Fiorita, giving Vaduz an advantage ahead of the second leg in Liechtenstein.

On 15 August 2019 SC Veltheim announced, that Ciccone had joined the club.

== Personal life ==
Ciccone is of Italian descent.

== Career statistics ==
As of match played 4 February 2017

Appearances and goals by club, season and competition
Club	Season	League			Cup (Note: Includes Swiss Cup and Liechtenstein Football Cup)		Europe (Note: Includes UEFA Europa League and UEFA Intertoto Cup)		Total	
Club	Season	Division	Apps	Goals	Apps	Goals	Apps	Goals	Apps	Goals
St. Gallen	2006–07	Swiss Super League	14	1	0	0	—		14	1
St. Gallen	2007–08	Swiss Super League	31	2	4	0	2	0	37	2
St. Gallen	2008–09	Swiss Challenge League	23	2	3	0	—		3	0
St. Gallen	2009–10	Swiss Super League	6	0	1	0	—		7	0
St. Gallen	Total		74	5	8	0	2	0	84	5
Vaduz	2010–11	Swiss Challenge League	29	4	3	2	2	0	34	6
Vaduz	2011–12	Swiss Challenge League	23	1	3	0	2	0	28	1
Vaduz	2012–13	Swiss Challenge League	30	2	3	0	—		33	2
Vaduz	2013–14	Swiss Challenge League	21	2	3	1	1	0	25	3
Vaduz	2014–15	Swiss Super League	26	0	2	1	2	0	30	1
Vaduz	2015–16	Swiss Super League	33	1	2	0	6	2	41	3
Vaduz	2016–17	Swiss Super League	13	0	1	0	4	0	18	0
Vaduz	Total		175	10	17	4	17	2	209	16
Career total			249	15	25	4	19	2	293	21

== Honours ==
St. Gallen

- Swiss Challenge League: 2008–09

Vaduz

- Swiss Challenge League: 2013–14
- Liechtenstein Football Cup (6): 2010–11, 2012–13, 2013–14, 2014–15, 2015–16, 2016-17
