= Levent Gülen =

Swiss footballer (born 1994)

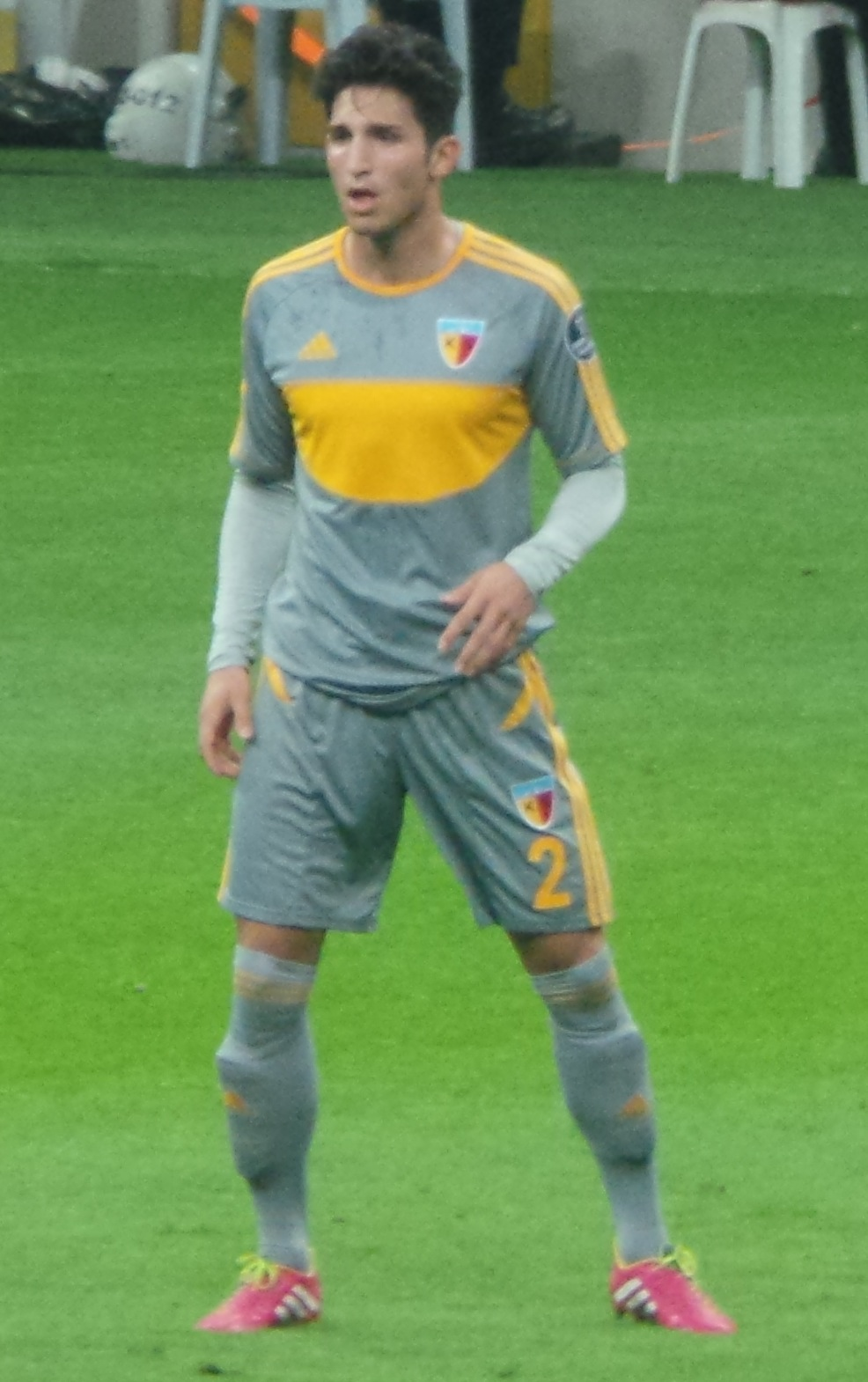
- Gülen playing for Kayserispor in 2014

Personal information
- Date of birth: 24 February 1994 (age 32)
- Place of birth: Aarau District, Switzerland
- Height: 1.86 m (6 ft 1 in)
- Position: Centre-back

Team information
- Current team: Şanlıurfaspor

Senior career*
Years	Team	Apps	(Gls)
2011–2016	Grasshopper II	55	(0)
2012–2016	Grasshopper	28	(0)
2014	→ Kayserispor (loan)	14	(0)
2016	→ Vaduz (loan)	5	(0)
2016–2020	Kayserispor	71	(2)
2020–2021	Ankaraspor	19	(0)
2021–2022	Volos	24	(1)
2022–2023	Miedź Legnica	27	(0)
2023–2025	ŁKS Łódź	46	(1)
2023	ŁKS Łódź II	1	(0)
2025–	Şanlıurfaspor	0	(0)

International career
	Switzerland U15	2	(0)
	Switzerland U16	6	(0)
	Switzerland U17	13	(1)
	Switzerland U18	9	(0)
	Switzerland U19	10	(0)
2013–2014	Switzerland U20	5	(0)
2014–2016	Switzerland U21	5	(0)
- * Club domestic league appearances and goals as of 15:37, 19 May 2025 (UTC)

Levent Gülen (born 24 February 1994) is a Swiss professional footballer who plays as a centre-back for Turkish club Şanlıurfaspor.

== Honours ==
Grasshopper

- Swiss Cup: 2012–13

Vaduz

- Liechtenstein Cup: 2015–16
