= Adrien Jaccottet =

Swiss football referee (born 1983)

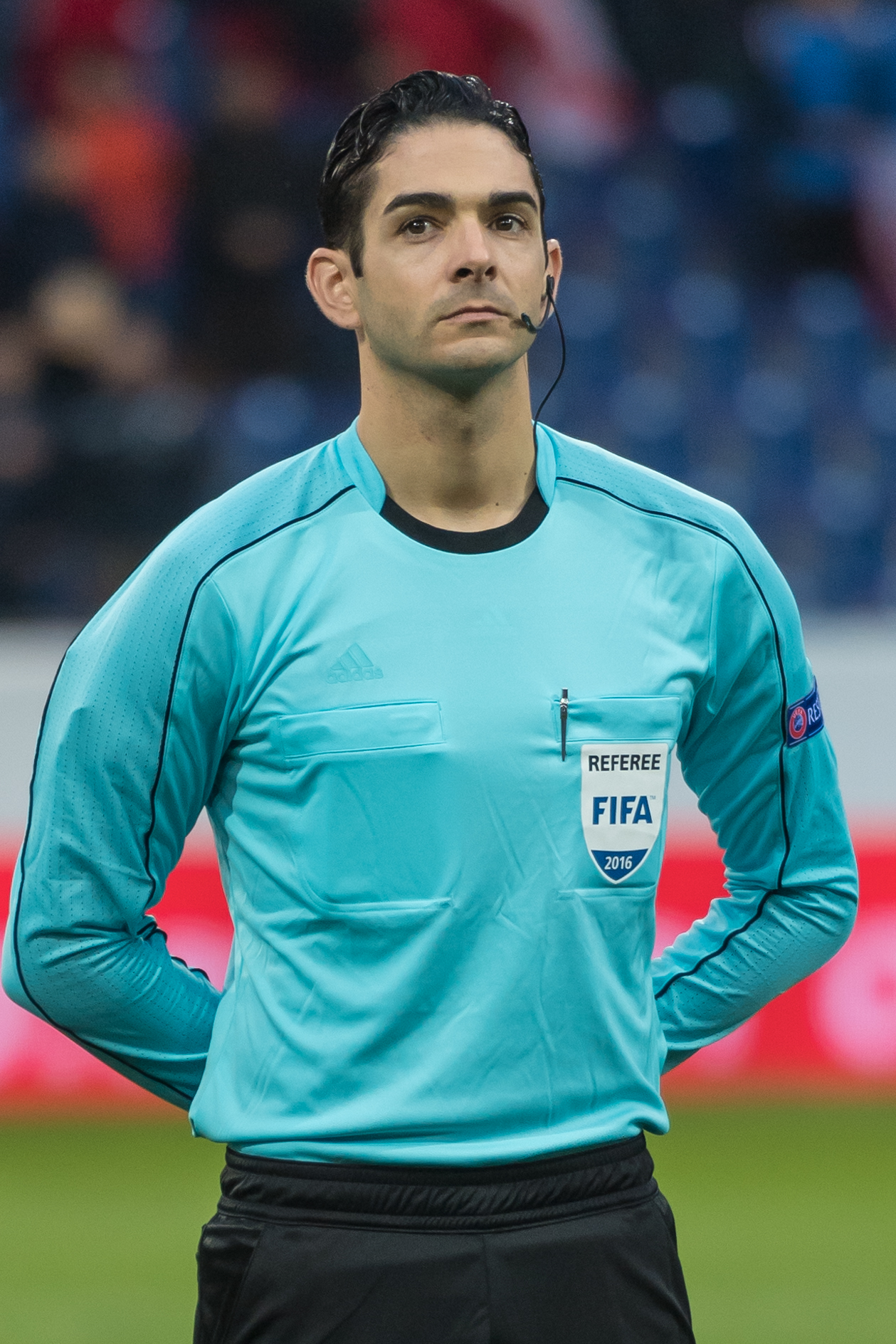
- Full name: Adrien Jaccottet
- Born: 19 July 1983 (age 43); Basel, Switzerland
- Other occupation: Lawyer

Domestic
Years	League	Role
2010–2021	Swiss Super League	Referee

International
Years	League	Role
2012–2021	FIFA listed	Referee

Adrien Jaccottet (born 19 July 1983) is a Swiss lawyer and former professional football referee. He has been a full international for FIFA since 2012.

According to the ASF/SFV, nationally (from the 1. Liga upwards) and internationally, Jaccottet recorded 472 appearances as referee. Since 2010 he has officiated 190 times in the Super League and 94 times in the Challenge League. In addition, he was in charge of the 2018 Swiss Cup final between Zürich and Young Boys. Internationally, league games were added as part of exchange programs in Austria, Greece, Poland and Saudi Arabia. In future Jaccottet will concentrate on his profession as a lawyer by becoming a partner in the law firm and increasing his workload.

Jaccottet made his last appearance as a top grade arbitrator on 12 December 2021 in the Super League match between Young Boys and Sion (4–3).
