= Vaso Vasić =

Serbian footballer (born 1990)

Personal information
- Date of birth: 26 April 1990 (age 36)
- Place of birth: Leuggern, Switzerland
- Height: 1.86 m (6 ft 1 in)
- Position: Goalkeeper

Senior career*
Years	Team	Apps	(Gls)
2007–2008	Grasshoppers U21	7	(0)
2008–2012	Winterthur	48	(0)
2012	YF Juventus	17	(0)
2012–2014	Schaffhausen	61	(0)
2014–2018	Grasshoppers	66	(0)
2018–2019	Apollon Smyrnis	2	(0)
2019–2021	Mouscron	17	(0)
2021–2026	Luzern	15	(0)

International career
2011	Serbia U21	5	(0)
- * Club domestic league appearances and goals as of 16 May 2026

Vaso Vasić (Serbian Cyrillic: Васо Васић; born 26 April 1990) is a professional footballer who plays as a goalkeeper. Born in Switzerland, he represented Serbia internationally.

== Club career ==
In the summer of 2021, he returned to Switzerland and signed a one-year contract with Luzern.

== International career ==
Vasić was born in Switzerland to parents of Serbian descent. He represented Serbia U21.
