= Gianluca Hossmann =

German–Swiss footballer (born 1991)

Personal information
- Date of birth: 25 March 1991 (age 35)
- Place of birth: Winterthur, Switzerland
- Height: 1.75 m (5 ft 9 in)
- Position: Defender

Team information
- Current team: pause

Senior career*
| Years | Team | Apps | (Gls) |
| 2009–2013 | Grasshopper Club Zürich II | 70 | (0) |
| 2010–2015 | Grasshopper Club Zürich | 6 | (0) |
| 2013–2014 | → FC Biel-Bienne (loan) | 14 | (0) |
| 2015– | MSV Duisburg II | 9 | (0) |
| 2015–2016 | MSV Duisburg | 1 | (0) |
| 2016–2018 | FC Seefeld Zürich | 24 | (5) |
- * Club domestic league appearances and goals as of 23 October 2018

Gianluca Hossmann (born 25 March 1991) is a German–Swiss football player who last played as a defender for FC Seefeld Zürich.

== Career ==
He made his 2. Bundesliga debut for MSV Duisburg on 26 September 2015 against Union Berlin.
