= Manuel Kubli =

Swiss footballer (born 1995)

Personal information
- Full name: Manuel Kubli
- Date of birth: 9 April 1995 (age 31)
- Place of birth: Switzerland
- Height: 1.72 m (5 ft 8 in)
- Position: Central midfielder

Team information
- Current team: YF Juventus
- Number: 10

Youth career
- FC Engstringen
- Grasshopper

Senior career*
Years	Team	Apps	(Gls)
2015–2017	Grasshopper	1	(0)
2014–2015	→ FC Rapperswil-Jona (loan)	24	(3)
2016–2017	→ FC Rapperswil-Jona (loan)	19	(1)
2017–2021	FC Rapperswil-Jona	84	(8)
2022–2023	FC Linth 04	21	(2)
2023–	YF Juventus	71	(14)
- * Club domestic league appearances and goals as of 1 October 2026

Manuel Kubli (born 9 April 1995) is a Swiss footballer who plays for YF Juventus.
