= Benjamin Lüthi =

Swiss footballer (born 1988)

Personal information
- Full name: Benjamin Lüthi
- Date of birth: 30 November 1988 (age 37)
- Place of birth: Switzerland
- Height: 1.80 m (5 ft 11 in)
- Positions: Right-back; midfielder

Senior career*
| Years | Team | Apps | (Gls) |
| 2006–2014 | FC Thun | 60 | (2) |
| 2014–2016 | Grasshopper | 44 | (0) |
- * Club domestic league appearances and goals

Benjamin Lüthi (born 30 November 1988) is a retired Swiss professional footballer who played as a right-back or as a midfielder.

== Career ==
In December 2016, Lüthi announced his immediate retirement from professional football.
