= Matteo Fedele =

Swiss footballer (born 1992)

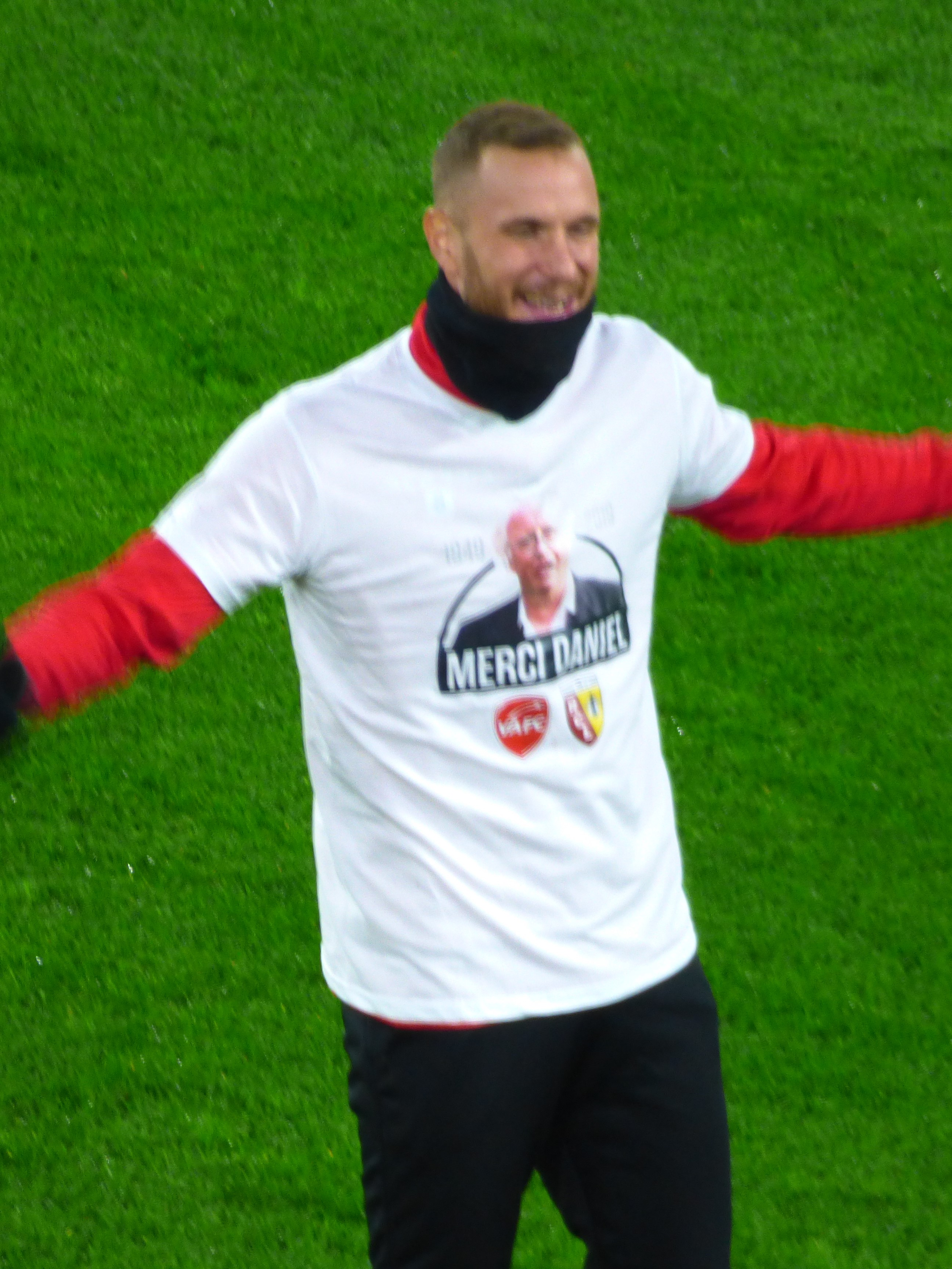
- Fedele in 2019

Personal information
- Date of birth: 20 July 1992 (age 34)
- Place of birth: Lausanne, Switzerland
- Height: 1.85 m (6 ft 1 in)
- Position: Central midfielder

Team information
- Current team: Bavois
- Number: 4

Youth career
- 2000–2004: Azzurri 90
- 2004–2007: Lausanne-Sport
- 2007–2009: Lille
- 2009–2013: Sion

Senior career*
Years	Team	Apps	(Gls)
2013–2016	Sion	26	(1)
2015	→ Grasshopper (loan)	12	(0)
2015–2016	→ Carpi (loan)	8	(0)
2016–2017	Carpi	1	(0)
2016–2017	→ Bari (loan)	25	(4)
2017–2019	Foggia	9	(0)
2018	→ Cesena (loan)	14	(1)
2018–2019	→ Universitatea Craiova (loan)	25	(2)
2019–2021	Valenciennes	13	(0)
2021–2022	Universitatea Craiova	19	(0)
2022–2023	Ħamrun Spartans	16	(1)
2023	Birkirkara	10	(1)
2023–2024	Chindia Târgoviște	14	(3)
2024–2025	Atletico Uri	17	(3)
2025	Sestri Levante	10	(0)
2025–	Bavois	36	(2)

International career
2007	Switzerland U15	3	(1)
2008	Switzerland U16	2	(0)
2008–2009	Switzerland U17	6	(0)
2014	Switzerland U21	1	(0)
- * Club domestic league appearances and goals as of 1 October 2026

Matteo Fedele (born 20 July 1992) is a Swiss professional footballer who plays as a central midfielder for Promotion League club Bavois.

== Club career ==
Fedele is a youth exponent from FC Sion. He made his Swiss Super League debut on 16 May 2013 against Grasshopper Club Zürich. He played the first 74 minutes of a 0–4 home loss.

== Honours ==
FC Sion

- Swiss Cup: 2014–15

Universitatea Craiova

- Cupa României: 2020–21
- Supercupa României: 2021

Birkirkara

- Maltese FA Trophy: 2022–23

Ħamrun Spartans

- Maltese Premier League: 2022–23
