= Caio (footballer, born 1986) =

Brazilian footballer

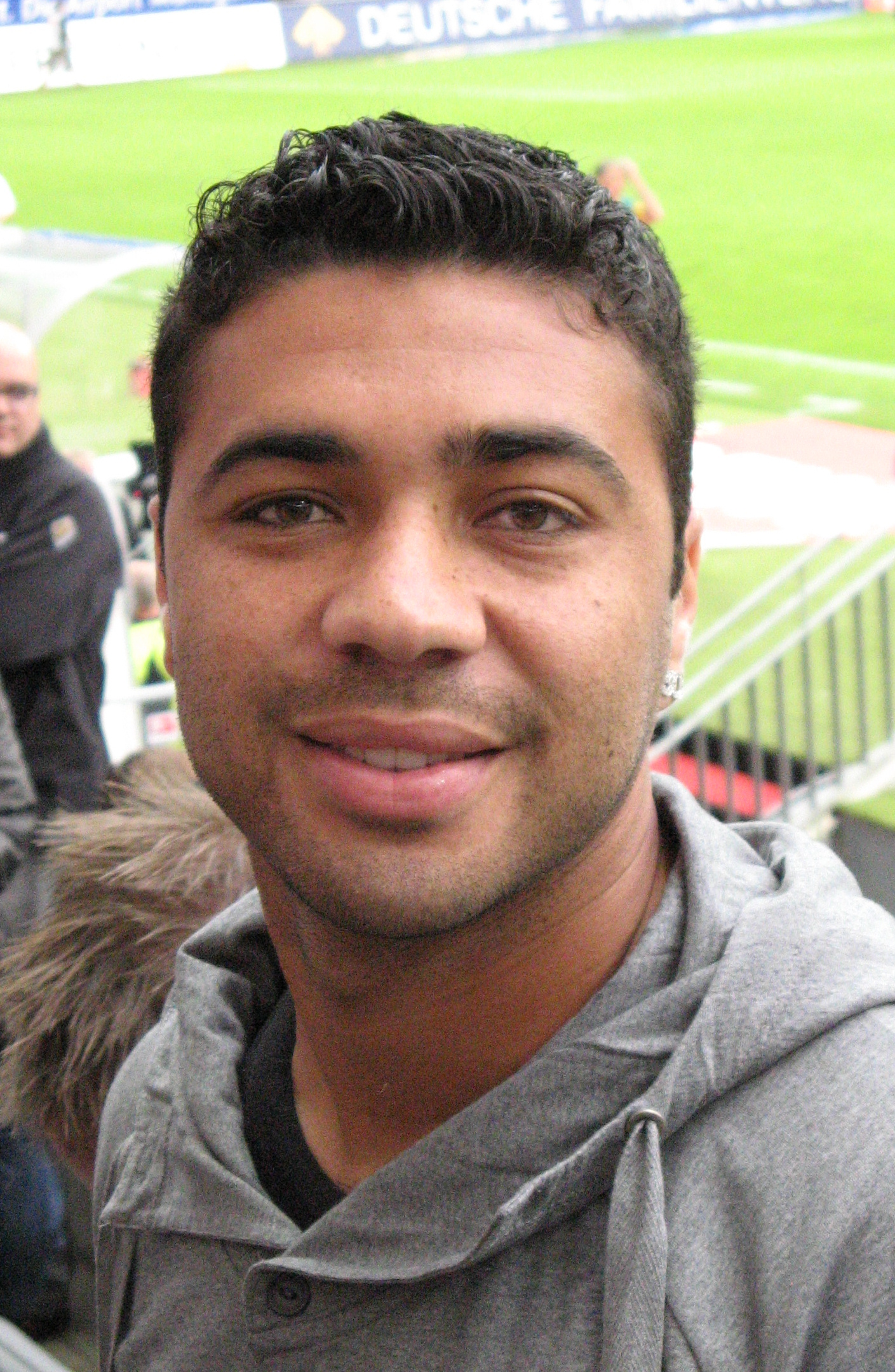
- Caio in 2011

Personal information
- Full name: Caio César Alves dos Santos
- Date of birth: 29 May 1986 (age 40)
- Place of birth: Mirandópolis, Brazil
- Height: 1.86 m (6 ft 1 in)
- Position: Attacking midfielder

Youth career
- 2000–2001: Barueri

Senior career*
Years	Team	Apps	(Gls)
2002–2007	Barueri		
2003–2005	→ Guarani (loan)	5	(0)
2007	→ Internacional (loan)	8	(0)
2007	→ Palmeiras (loan)	27	(9)
2008–2012	Eintracht Frankfurt	85	(8)
2012	Bahia	6	(0)
2013	Atlético Goianiense	3	(0)
2013–2017	Grasshopper	131	(50)
2017–2019	Maccabi Haifa	22	(1)
2018–2019	→ Hapoel Tel Aviv (loan)	21	(3)
2020–?	Desportivo Brasil	0	(0)
- * Club domestic league appearances and goals

Caio César Alves dos Santos (born 29 May 1986), or simply Caio, is a Brazilian former professional footballer who played as an attacking midfielder.

== Honours ==
Individual

- Swiss Super League Team of the Year: 2015–16
