= 2015–16 Swiss Super League =

119th season of top-tier Swiss football

Swiss Super League
- Season: 2015–16
- Dates: 18 July 2015 – 25 May 2016
- Champions: Basel
- Relegated: Zürich
- Champions League: Basel; Young Boys
- Europa League: Zürich (although relegated); Luzern; Grasshopper; Vaduz
- Matches: 180
- Goals: 566 (3.14 per match)
- Top goalscorer: Mu'nas Dabbur (19 goals)
- Biggest home win: Young Boys 7–0 Lugano (9 April 2016)
- Biggest away win: St. Gallen 0–7 Basel (17 April 2016)
- Highest scoring: Young Boys 5–4 Vaduz (17 April 2016)
- Longest winning run: Basel (8 games)
- Longest unbeaten run: Basel (17 games)
- Longest winless run: Zürich (11 games)
- Longest losing run: Zürich (5 games); Luzern (5 games)

The 2015–16 Swiss Super League, also known as Raiffeisen Super League for sponsoring purposes, was the 119th season of top-tier football in Switzerland. Basel were the defending champions.

A total of 10 teams competed in the league, the 9 best teams from the 2014–15 season and the 2014–15 Swiss Challenge League champion Lugano.

== Teams ==
=== Stadia and locations ===
Location of the 2015–16 Swiss Super League teams

Club	Location	Stadium	Capacity
Basel	Basel	St. Jakob-Park	38,512
Grasshopper	Zürich	Letzigrund	23,605
Lugano	Lugano	Stadio Cornaredo	10,500
Luzern	Lucerne	Swissporarena	17,500
Sion	Sion	Stade Tourbillon	16,500
St. Gallen	St. Gallen	AFG Arena	19,694
Thun	Thun	Stockhorn Arena	10,000
Vaduz	(Liechtenstein) Vaduz	Rheinpark Stadion	7,584
Young Boys	Bern	Stade de Suisse	31,783
Zürich	Zürich	Letzigrund	23,605

=== Personnel and kits ===
Team	Manager	Captain	Kit manufacturer	Shirt sponsor
Basel	(Switzerland) Urs Fischer	(Argentina) Matías Delgado	adidas	Novartis
Grasshopper	(Switzerland) Pierluigi Tami	(Sweden) Kim Källström	Puma	FROMM/Priora
Lugano	(Czech Republic) Zdeněk Zeman	(Switzerland) Antoine Rey	Nike	Città di Lugano
Luzern	(Germany) Markus Babbel	(Switzerland) Claudio Lustenberger	adidas	Otto's
Sion	(France) Didier Tholot	(Ivory Coast) Xavier Kouassi	Erreà	Alloboissons
St. Gallen	(Germany) Joe Zinnbauer	(Kosovo) Albert Bunjaku	Jako	St. Galler Kantonalbank
Thun	(Luxembourg) Jeff Saibene	(Switzerland) Dennis Hediger	Nike	Panorama Center
Vaduz	(Switzerland) Giorgio Contini	(Liechtenstein) Franz Burgmeier	adidas	Liechtensteinische Landesbank
Young Boys	(Austria) Adi Hütter	(Switzerland) Steve von Bergen	Nike	Honda
Zürich	(Finland) Sami Hyypiä	(Ivory Coast) Gilles Yapi Yapo	Nike	Netstream AG

== League table ==
Pos	Team	Pld	W	D	L	GF	GA	GD	Pts	Qualification or relegation
1	Basel (C)	36	26	5	5	88	38	+50	83	Qualification for the Champions League group stage
2	Young Boys	36	20	9	7	78	47	+31	69	Qualification for the Champions League third qualifying round
3	Luzern	36	15	9	12	59	50	+9	54	Qualification for the Europa League third qualifying round
4	Grasshopper	36	15	8	13	65	56	+9	53	Qualification for the Europa League second qualifying round
5	Sion	36	14	8	14	52	49	+3	50	
6	Thun	36	10	11	15	45	54	−9	41	
7	St. Gallen	36	10	8	18	41	66	−25	38	
8	Vaduz	36	7	15	14	44	60	−16	36	Qualification for the Europa League first qualifying round (Note: Vaduz qualified for the UEFA Europa League first qualifying round by winning the 2015–16 Liechtenstein Cup.)
9	Lugano	36	9	8	19	46	75	−29	35	
10	Zürich (R)	36	7	13	16	48	71	−23	34	Qualification for the Europa League group stage and relegation to Challenge League (Note: Zürich qualified for the UEFA Europa League group stage by winning the 2015–16 Swiss Cup.)

Source: Swiss Super League, Soccerway
Rules for classification: 1) Points; 2) Goal difference; 3) Goals scored; 4) Head-to-head points 5) Draw.
(C) Champions; (R) Relegated

== Results ==
=== First and Second Round ===
Home \ Away	BAS	GRA	LUG	LUZ	SIO	STG	THU	VAD	YB	ZÜR
Basel		2–3	3–1	3–0	3–0	2–1	3–1	2–0	1–0	3–1
Grasshopper	2–3		6–1	1–0	2–0	1–1	1–2	2–0	3–2	5–0
Lugano	1–3	4–1		0–1	3–0	3–1	2–3	1–0	1–1	0–0
Luzern	1–3	3–3	2–2		2–2	0–1	1–0	1–1	3–1	1–0
Sion	0–2	3–2	3–0	2–0		1–0	1–2	0–1	1–3	3–1
St. Gallen	2–1	0–2	2–0	1–0	1–1		1–0	2–2	1–1	0–2
Thun	0–2	3–5	2–1	0–1	0–2	0–2		1–0	0–1	5–1
Vaduz	1–2	3–3	1–1	1–2	1–1	1–0	1–1		1–1	2–2
Young Boys	4–3	3–1	0–1	1–1	1–1	2–1	3–1	4–0		1–1
Zürich	2–2	2–3	5–3	2–5	1–0	2–2	3–3	1–1	1–1	

Source: Swiss Super League
Legend: Blue = home team win; Yellow = draw; Red = away team win.

=== Third and Fourth Round ===
Home \ Away	BAS	GRA	LUG	LUZ	SIO	STG	THU	VAD	YB	ZÜR
Basel		0–1	3–0	3–0	2–1	4–2	1–1	5–1	2–0	2–2
Grasshopper	0–4		0–1	1–1	3–0	2–0	0–0	1–2	1–2	4–2
Lugano	1–4	0–1		1–1	0–6	3–0	2–1	2–5	1–3	0–0
Luzern	4–0	3–0	2–1		2–2	0–1	3–0	5–1	2–3	1–2
Sion	0–1	2–1	3–1	3–1		1–1	2–1	2–0	2–1	2–2
St. Gallen	0–7	2–0	3–3	1–4	2–1		1–2	1–3	2–3	3–0
Thun	1–1	2–1	2–1	1–1	1–1	2–2		2–2	0–3	4–0
Vaduz	0–0	1–1	0–0	1–2	2–0	3–0	0–0		1–1	0–3
Young Boys	2–3	1–1	7–0	5–2	3–2	3–1	2–1	5–4		3–0
Zürich	2–3	1–1	0–4	0–1	0–1	4–0	0–0	3–1	0–1	

Source: Swiss Super League
Legend: Blue = home team win; Yellow = draw; Red = away team win.

== Season statistics ==
=== Top goalscorers ===
As of 14 May 2016.

Rank	Scorer	Club	Goals
1	(Israel) Mu'nas Dabbur	Grasshopper	19
2	(France) Guillaume Hoarau	BSC Young Boys	17
3	(Austria) Marc Janko	Basel	16
4	(Brazil) Caio Alves	Grasshopper	13
4	(Switzerland) Marco Schneuwly	Luzern	13
4	(France) Yoric Ravet	Grasshopper	13
7	(Albania) Armando Sadiku	Vaduz	12
8	(Switzerland) Shani Tarashaj	Grasshopper	11
8	(Democratic Republic of the Congo) Ridge Munsy	Thun	11
8	(Serbia) Danijel Aleksić	St. Gallen	11

== Awards ==
=== Annual awards ===
Award	Winner	Club
Player of the Season	(Switzerland) Breel Embolo	Basel
«Mon joueur» Fans' Player of the Year	(Switzerland) Breel Embolo	Basel
Young Player of the Season	(Switzerland) Shani Tarashaj	GC
Coach of the Season	(Switzerland) Pierluigi Tami	GC
Goal of the Season	(Israel) Mu'nas Dabbur	GC

Team of the Year
Goalkeeper	(Czech Republic) Tomáš Vaclík (Basel)			
Defence	(Switzerland) Michael Lang (Basel)	(Switzerland) Marek Suchý (Basel)	(Switzerland) Roy Gelmi (St. Gallen)	(The Gambia) Pa Modou Jagne (Sion)
Midfield	(Portugal) Carlitos (Sion)	(Switzerland) Luca Zuffi (Basel)	(Sweden) Kim Källström (Grasshopper)	(Brazil) Caio (Grasshopper)
Attack	(Switzerland) Breel Embolo (Basel)		(Israel) Munas Dabbur (Grasshopper)	

== Attendances ==
#	Club	Average	% Change	Highest
1	Basel	28,597	-1,0%	33,360
2	Young Boys	16,938	0,0%	27,340
3	St. Gallen	12,941	-2,9%	17,546
4	Luzern	11,292	3,4%	16,500
5	Zürich	8,701	-7,3%	15,955
6	Sion	8,267	3,6%	11,400
7	GCZ	6,461	4,7%	14,400
8	Thun	6,067	-4,1%	8,026
9	Lugano	4,241	34,7%	6,224
10	Vaduz	4,006	-3,5%	6,023
