= 2013–14 FC Basel season =

Football season review

FC Basel
2013–14 season
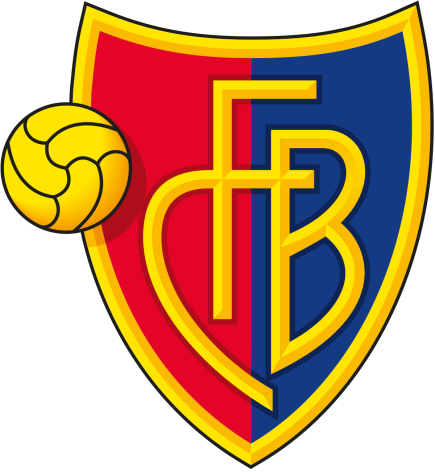
- Chairman: Bernhard Heusler
- Manager: Murat Yakin
- Ground: St. Jakob-Park, Basel, Switzerland
- Super League: 1st
- Swiss Cup: Runners-up
- Champions League: Group stage
- Europa League: Quarter-finals
- Top goalscorer: League: Valentin Stocker (13); All: Marco Streller (19)
- Highest home attendance: Swiss League: 34,172 vs. Grasshopper Club (27 April 2014); Champions League: 35.208 vs. Chelsea (26 November 2013)
- Lowest home attendance: Champions League Qualification: 12,353; Maccabi Tel Aviv (30 July 2013); Swiss League: 24,951 vs. Lausanne-Sport (27 July 2013)
Home colours	Away colours

The 2013–14 season was the 121st in the history of FC Basel. Basel were the reigning champions of the Swiss Super League, having won the title in each of the previous four seasons. Playing their home matches at St. Jakob-Park, Basel lost only two matches in the league, at home to FC Zürich in Round 5 and away to Young Boys Bern in Round 34. Despite a high percentage of drawn matches, they finished seven points clear of Grasshopper Club Zürich to win their fifth successive title. Basel reached the final of the 2013–14 Swiss Cup but lost 2–0 to FC Zürich.

In the 2013–14 UEFA Champions League, Basel began in the third qualifying round and, after victories over Maccabi Tel Aviv and Ludogorets Razgrad, qualified for the group stage. They were drawn into Group E with Chelsea, Schalke 04 and Steaua București. Basel finished third in the group and qualified for the 2013–14 UEFA Europa League round of 32. They reached the quarter-finals, where they were defeated by Valencia.

Murat Yakin continued to manage the team, having been appointed on 15 October 2012. The club lost the services of Alexander Frei, who retired in March 2013. Basel were active in the transfer market, a significant transaction being the sale of Mohamed Salah to Chelsea for an estimated £13 million.

== Club ==
=== FC Basel Holding AG ===
In 2013–14, FC Basel Holding AG owned 75% of FC Basel 1893 AG; the club and its members owned 25%. Executive officeholders in the holding company were Bernhard Heusler (chairman), Stephan Werthmüller (finance director) and Georg Heitz (Sportdirector). As chairman of the holding company, Heusler was also chairman of the club.

=== Club management ===
At the annual general meeting, the existing board of directors were willing to continue as before. They were all re-elected unanimously.

Chairman	(Switzerland) Bernhard Heusler
Vice-Chairman	(Switzerland) Adrian Knup
Finances	(Switzerland) Stephan Werthmüller
Sportdirector	(Switzerland) Georg Heitz
Marketing	(Switzerland) René Kamm
Director	(Switzerland) Reto Baumgartner
Director	(Switzerland) Dominik Donzé
Director	(Switzerland) Benno Kaiser
Ground (capacity and dimensions)	St. Jakob-Park (38,512 for club matches / 37,500 for international matches / 120x80 metres)

Last updated: 1 July 2013
Source: FCB Official Site

=== Team management ===
The first team manager for the season was Murat Yakin, his second season in charge, his assistants being Marco Walker and Markus Hoffmann. Massimo Colomba was the Goalkeeper coach and Massimo Ceccaroni was appointed as head of the Youth System, with the coach of the Under-21s team, Thomas Häberli.

Position	Staff
Manager	(Switzerland) Murat Yakin since 15 October 2012
1 Assistant manager	(Switzerland) Marco Walker
2 Assistant manager	(Austria) Markus Hoffmann
Goalkeeper Coach	(Switzerland) Massimo Colomba
Team Administration	(Switzerland) Gustav Nussbaumer
Youth Team Coach	(Switzerland) Thomas Häberli
Youth Team Co-Coach	(Switzerland) Roland Heri

Last updated: 1 July 2013
Source: FCB Official Site

== Transfers and retirements ==
=== Offseason and preseason ===
Basel's biggest signings in pre-season were two players who had already played for the club in recent years: Behrang Safari, who returned from RSC Anderlecht; and Matías Delgado, who was signed on a free transfer from Al Jazira Club. Taulant Xhaka also rejoined the clubhaving spent the previous season on loan at Grasshopper Club Zürich. Giovanni Sio was signed from VfL Wolfsburg and Ivan Ivanov from Partizan

Aleksandar Dragović was transferred to Dynamo Kyiv. Others who departed were Park Joo-Ho to 1. FSV Mainz 05; Gilles Yapi Yapo to Dubai CSC; Cabral to Sunderland; Markus Steinhöfer to Real Betis; and Jacques Zoua to Hamburger SV.

The most significant departure was by Alexander Frei, who retired from playing to commence a coaching career. In two spells at the club (1997 to 1998 and 2009 to 2013), Frei played in 217 matches and scored a total of 148 goals, winning four league championships and two cup titles.

=== Mid-season ===
In August, Raul Bobadilla was sold to FC Augsburg of the Bundesliga, following a personal incident with traffic police.

=== Winter break ===
During the winter transfer window, Basel signed Davide Callà from FC Aarau in exchange for Stephan Andrist. Mohamed Salah was sold to Chelsea for an estimated £13 million. Basel also signed Marek Suchý on loan from Spartak Moscow until the end of the season.

== Campaign ==
=== 2013–14 Swiss Super League ===
FC Basel were aiming to win the Swiss Super League for the fifth time in succession. The 2013–14 season began on 13 July 2013 and, in their first round match away to FC Aarau, Basel won 3–1. In previous seasons, the team had made a slow start before building momentum through the middle part of the season. This was the case once again because, after losing 1–2 to FC Zürich, they were fourth after round six, and six points behind the league leaders, BSC Young Boys. However, Basel turned things around in the next match as they defeated Young Boys 2–1 and began a run of 28 league matches without a defeat.

After round eleven, Basel were in pole position, two points ahead of Grasshopper Club Zürich. As the winter break began, they were one point above FC Luzern. Their unbeaten run continued until 11 May 2014, when they were defeated by Young Boys at the Stade de Suisse. Basel secured their fifth successive league championship title, finishing seven points clear of Grasshopper. It was their seventeenth title in all. They won 19 games of their 36 games, losing only twice. Despite their success, head coach Yakin did not have his contract extended. Valentin Stocker was the club's top scorer in the league, scoring 13 goals in 30 appearances.

=== 2013–14 Swiss Cup ===
Basel played in the first round of the Swiss Cup on 17 August 2013. They were drawn against amateur club BSC Old Boys, who played in the 1. Liga Promotion, the third tier of the Swiss football league system. Having to go into extra time against Old Boys, FCB only prevailed 1–0 thanks to a header from the newly signed Bulgarian Ivan Ivanov in the 95th minute, playing with 10 men at the Stadion Schützenmatte, in front of 4,384 spectators. In the second round on 14 September, the teams from the Super League were seeded and could not play each other. Home advantage was granted to the team from the lower league. Basel were drawn against FC Münsingen of the fourth tier 1. Liga. Basel won 1–0 win with a penalty by Matías Delgado.

In the third round on 10 November, Super League teams were again seeded and could not play each other. Basel were drawn against FC Tuggen of the third tier 1. Liga Promotion. After a goalless first half, Basel won 3–1 with goals by Mo Salah, Giovanni Sio and Marcelo Diaz. The quarter-finals were played on 5 February 2014, following postponement due to the weather, and Basel were drawn away to third tier FC Le Mont, whom they defeated 6–1. In the semi-final on 26 March, Basel were drawn at home against FC Luzern and won 1–0 after a late goal scored by Davide Callà.

The final was played on 21 April (Easter Monday) against FC Zürich at the Stade de Suisse before 23,312 fans. Gastón Sauro was sent off in the second half and ten-man Basel held out for a goalless draw after 90 minutes. Nine minutes into extra time, Giovanni Sio received a yellow-red card and Basel were two men down. Mario Gavranović scored twice in the next five minutes to give Zürich a 2–0 win.

=== 2013–14 UEFA Champions League ===
Because Basel entered the Champions League in the qualifying phase their initial aim was to reach the group stage. The draw for the third qualifying round was held on 19 July 2013 at the UEFA headquarters in Nyon. Basel were drawn against Maccabi Tel Aviv with the home leg of the tie at St. Jakob-Park on 30 July 2013. A goal by Valentin Stocker after 39 minutes gave Basel a 1–0 win. In the return on 6 August, Basel led 3–0 at half-time but Maccabi staged a comeback and the match ended 3–3, Basel winning the tie 4–3 on aggregate.

In the play-off round on 21 and 27 August, Basel were drawn against PFC Ludogorets Razgrad. The first leg was played at the Vasil Levski National Stadium in Sofia. Mo Salah scored twice as Basel won 4–2. In the second leg, Fabian Frei and Philipp Degen scored to give Basel a 2–0 win (6–2 on aggregate).

The draw for the group stage was held in Monaco on 29 August and placed Basel in Group E with Chelsea, Schalke 04 and Steaua București. In their first match on 18 September, Basel were away to group favourites Chelsea at Stamford Bridge before an attendance of 40,358. Chelsea took the lead in the first half and, creating more opportunities in the second, looked to be the better team. Basel sprang a shock, however, as Salah and Streller scored well-taken goals in the 71st and 81st minutes respectively for an unexpected 2–1 victory.

Basel's next match was at home to Schalke 04 on 1 October. St Jakob-Park was sold out with an attendance of 33,251. The kickoff was delayed by a Greenpeace protest action. Schalke won 1–0, courtesy of a 54th-minute goal by Julian Draxler. Basel played Steaua București at the Arena Națională in Bucharest on 22 October. Marcelo Diaz scored for Basel early in the second half but Steaua equalised through substitute Leandro Tatu in the 88th minute. Having played each of their opponents once, Basel had four points and were still in contention for a place in the knockout phase.

In the return game against Steaua on 6 November, Basel went a goal down early in the first half and were still behind as the match entered injury time. To their relief, substitute Giovanni Sio then scored from close range, and as in the previous meeting between the two teams, the match ended in a 1–1 draw. On 26 November, Basel hosted Chelsea and completed a double by winning 1–0. The goal by Mo Salah came from a counter-attack in the 86th minute.

Basel's final match of the group stage was against Schalke at the Veltins-Arena in Gelsenkirchen on 11 December. It was a sell-out with an attendance of 52,093. Despite losing twice to Basel, Chelsea had nine points from three wins and were certain to qualify for the next phase as only one of Basel (8 points) or Schalke (7) could overtake them. Chelsea defeated Steaua in their final match to win the group with 12 points. Regardless of what happened in that match, Basel needed only a draw to qualify while Schalke were in a must-win situation. After half an hour's play, Basel's central defender Ivan Ivanov was sent off for an illegal challenge on Ádám Szalai. After 50 minutes, Draxler again scored for Schalke. Six minutes later, Joël Matip scored a controversial goal when he appeared to be clearly offside. The match ended 2–0 to Schalke, who qualified as runners-up with 10 points. Basel, with 8 points, were out of the Champions League but their third-place finish qualified them for the Europa League round of 32.

=== 2013–14 UEFA Europa League ===
The draw for the knockout phase of the Europa League, involving 32 teams, was held at UEFA headquarters in Nyon, Switzerland on 16 December 2013. Basel were drawn against the team that they had eliminated during the qualifying phase of the Champions League, Maccabi Tel Aviv. Both legs were scheduled for the end of February. The draw for the round of 16 was held on the same occasion and this matched the winners of the Maccabi v Basel tie against the winners of the AFC Ajax v Red Bull Salzburg tie. The last 16 matches were scheduled for 13 and 20 March.

Basel played Maccabi Tel Aviv on 20 and 27 February. They were away in the first leg which ended in a goalless draw. Basel dominated the return leg at St Jakob-Park and won 3–0.

Red Bull Salzburg had beaten Ajax 6–1 on aggregate to become Basel's opponents in the round of 16. The matches were played on 13 and 20 March. The first leg was played at St Jakob-Park before an attendance of 17,027. Basel were badly hit by injuries at this point of the season and were without Marco Streller, Behrang Safari, Marcelo Diaz, Kay Voser, Taulant Xhaka, Ivan Ivanov and Fabian Schär. Towards the end of the match, Basel used two 17-year-old substitutes Breel Embolo and Albian Ajeti, both making their professional debuts. Despite fielding a weakened team, Basel held out for a 0–0 draw. Salzburg were favourites to win the second leg and took the lead after 22 minutes with a goal by Jonathan Soriano. However, Basel fought back to win 21 after goals scored by Marco Streller (50 minutes) and Gastón Sauro (60).

The draw for the quarter-finals was held on 21 March and Basel were matched against Valencia. Basel were at home in the first leg played on 3 April. This match took place behind closed doors because of crowd trouble in the away match against Salzburg. Basel were also fined €107,000. Although eight players were out of action due to injury or suspension, Basel produced an outstanding performance to win 3–0 with goals by Matias Delgado (2) and Valentin Stocker. In the second leg at the Mestalla Stadium on 10 April, however, Basel were overwhelmed as Valencia won 5–0 after extra time.

== Players ==
=== First team squad ===
The following players were members of the Basel first team squad, including those who left or joined the club, during the 2013–14 season.

As of 15 March 2014

Note: Flags indicate national team as defined under FIFA eligibility rules; some limited exceptions apply. Players may hold more than one non-FIFA nationality.

No.	Pos.	Nation	Player
1	GK	SUI	Yann Sommer
4	DF	SUI	Philipp Degen
5	DF	SUI	Arlind Ajeti
6	DF	AUT	Aleksandar Dragović
7	MF	SUI	David Degen
8	MF	CIV	Serey Die
9	FW	SUI	Marco Streller (Captain)
10	MF	ARG	Matías Delgado
11	FW	PAR	Raul Bobadilla
13	DF	BUL	Ivan Ivanov
14	MF	SUI	Valentin Stocker
15	DF	SUI	Kay Voser
16	DF	SUI	Fabian Schär
17	MF	SUI	Endogan Adili
18	GK	SUI	Germano Vailati
19	DF	SWE	Behrang Safari
20	MF	SUI	Fabian Frei

No.	Pos.	Nation	Player
21	MF	CHI	Marcelo Díaz
22	MF	EGY	Mohamed Salah
23	GK	SUI	Mirko Salvi
24	FW	PRK	Pak Kwang-Ryong
25	DF	CZE	Marek Suchý
26	DF	ARG	Gastón Sauro
27	DF	SUI	Naser Aliji
28	MF	SUI	Stephan Andrist
30	FW	CIV	Giovanni Sio
32	FW	BIH	Admir Seferagić
33	MF	EGY	Mohamed Elneny
34	DF	SUI	Taulant Xhaka
35	DF	SUI	Fabian Ritter
36	FW	SUI	Breel Embolo
37	DF	SUI	Simon Dünki
38	FW	SUI	Albian Ajeti
39	MF	SUI	Davide Callà

=== Out on loan ===
24	FW	PRK	Pak Kwang-Ryong (at Vaduz until 19 August 2013 and again from 1 January until 30 June 2014)
–	MF	SUI	Pascal Schürpf (at Vaduz until 30 June 2014)
–	DF	SUI	Simon Grether (at Winterthur until 30 June 2014)
–	MF	SUI	Stjepan Vuleta (at Wacker Innsbruck until 30 June 2014)
25	MF	SUI	Darko Jevtić (at Wacker Innsbruck from 2 September 2013 until 30 June 2014)
35	DF	SUI	Fabian Ritter (at Winterthur until 30 June 2014)
–	DF	SUI	Thibault Corbaz (at Biel until 30 June 2014)

=== Transfers Summer 2013 ===
==== In ====
34	DF	SUI	Taulant Xhaka (return from loan to Grasshoppers)
10	MF	ARG	Matías Emilio Delgado (from Al Jazira Club, free transfer)
13	DF	BUL	Ivan Ivanov (from Partizan)
19	DF	SWE	Behrang Safari (from RSC Anderlecht, n/a)
30	FW	CIV	Giovanni Sio (from VfL Wolfsburg)

==== Out ====
3	DF	KOR	Park Joo-Ho (to 1. FSV Mainz 05, n/a)
6	DF	AUT	Aleksandar Dragović (to Dynamo Kyiv, €9 million)
24	MF	CPV	Cabral (to Sunderland AFC, free transfer)
27	DF	GER	Markus Steinhöfer (to Real Betis, free transfer)
31	FW	CMR	Jacques Zoua (to Hamburger SV, free transfer)
11	FW	ARG	Raul Bobadilla (to FC Augsburg, n/a)

=== Transfers winter 2013/14 ===
==== In ====
25	DF	CZE	Marek Suchý (on loan from Spartak Moscow)
39	MF	SUI	Davide Callà (from Aarau n/a but estimated CHF 500,000)

==== Out ====
22	MF	EGY	Mohamed Salah (to Chelsea, n/a but estimated £13 Million)
28	MF	SUI	Stephan Andrist (to Aarau free transfer)

== Results and fixtures ==
=== Legend ===
Win Draw Loss Postponed

=== Friendly matches ===
==== Preseason ====
26 June 2013 Pre-season	FC Basel	3–2	RB Leipzig	Walchsee
17:00	Streller 10' (1:0); Andrist 71' (2:2); Al. Ajeti 86' (3:2)	FCB summary	32' (1:1) Schulz; 68' (1:2) Frahn	Stadium: Sportgelände am Birkenmoos; Attendance: 200; Referee: Peter Sippel

29 June 2013 Pre-season	FC Basel	2–0	SpVgg Unterhaching	Sportplatz Neuried
14:00	Jevtić 45' (1:0); Al. Ajeti 90' (2:0)	FCB summary		Attendance: 300; Referee: Karl Valentin

10 July 2013 Pre-season	Basel	1–3	Borussia Dortmund	St. Jakob-Park, Basel
19:30	Schär 17' (1:1)	FCB summary	11' (0:1) Reus; 27' (1:2) Mkhitaryan; 90' (1:3) Hofmann	Attendance: 18,696; Referee: Alain Bieri

24 July 2013 Friendly	Basel	3–3	1. FSV Mainz 05	Stadion Schützenmatte, Basel
19:00	Andrist 33' (1:0); Degen 61' (2:1); Schär 67' (pen. 3:1)	FCB summary	50' (pen. 1:1), 76' Choupo-Moting; 76' (3:2) Choupo-Moting; 84' (3:3) Choupo-Moting	Attendance: 1,143; Referee: Sascha Amhof

==== Uhrencup ====
The Uhrencup is a friendly club football tournament, held annually in Grenchen.

5 July 2013 Uhrencup; Round 1	Basel	3–0	Fortuna Düsseldorf	Stadion Brühl, Grenchen
19:30 CEST	Jevtić 7' (1:0); Veljko Simic 68' (2:0); Adili 78' (3:0)	FCB summary		Attendance: 4,191; Referee: Pascal Erlachner

8 July 2013 Uhrencup; Round 2	Basel	2–1	Red Star Belgrade	Stadion Brühl, Grenchen
19:30 CEST	D. Degen (yellow card) 3'; Fabian Ritter (yellow card) 22'; Dragović (yellow card) 58'; Stocker 80' (1:1); Bobadilla 88' (2:1)	FCB summary	(yellow card) 3' Mladenović; 42' (0:1) Mladenović; (yellow card) 22' (yellow-red card) 60' Aleksandar Kovačević	Attendance: 4,563; Referee: Fedayi San

==== Winter break ====
11 January 2014 Friendly	FC Basel	1–0	Feyenoord	Marbella Football Center, San Pedro de Alcántara
15:00	Streller 17' (1:0); P. Degen (yellow card) 29'	FCB summary		Attendance: 1,000; Referee: Raúl Pérez Godínez

14 January 2014 Friendly	FC Basel	0–1	Eintracht Braunschweig	Estadio Nuevo Mirador, Algeciras, Spain
16:00		(Report Braunschweig) (in German); FCB summary	Ademi 39' (0:1)	Attendance: 80; Referee: Jose Carlos Baena Acal

18 January 2014 Friendly	Hamburger SV	4–2	FC Basel	Imtech Arena, Hamburg
15:30	Çalhanoğlu 29' (1:1); Jansen 32' (2:1); Lasogga 59' (3:1); Lasogga 79' (4:2)	FCB summary	13' (0:1) Delgado; 60' (3:2) Sio	Attendance: 8,789; Referee: Florian Heft (Wietmarschen)

26 January 2014 Friendly	FC Basel	2–0	Servette	Stadion Schützenmatte, Basel
15:00	Streller 39' (1:0); Stocker 40' (2:0)	FCB summary		Attendance: 1,753; Referee: Pascal Erlachner

=== Swiss Super League ===
Kickoff times are in CET

==== First half of season ====
13 July 2013 Round 1	Basel	3–1	Aarau	St. Jakob-Park, Basel
19:45	Salah 23' (1:0); Salah (yellow card) 42'; Bobadilla 64' (2:0); Streller 73' (3:0)	FCB summary	(yellow card) 39' Ioniță; (yellow card) 58' Callà; 80' (3:1) Garat	Attendance: 27,471; Referee: (Switzerland) Stephan Studer

21 July 2013 Round 2	Grasshopper Club	1–1	Basel	Letzigrund, Zurich
16:00 CEST	Vilotic (yellow card) 12'; Hajrovic 48' (1:1); Khalifa (yellow card) 52'	FCB summary	21' (0:1) Schär; (yellow card) 52' Xhaka; (yellow card) 59' Frei; (yellow card) 60' Dragovic	Attendance: 9,297; Referee: (Switzerland) Alain Bieri

27 July 2013 Round 3	Basel	2–0	Lausanne-Sport	St. Jakob-Park, Basel
19:45	Schär 32' (pen. 1:0); Stocker (red card) 62'; Streller 82' (2:0)	FCB summary	(red card) 62' Chakhsi; (yellow card) 69' Ekeng; (yellow card) 73' Katz	Attendance: 24,951; Referee: (Switzerland) Nikolaj Hänni

3 August 2013 Round 4	St. Gallen	1–1	Basel	AFG Arena, St. Gallen
19:45 CEST	Janjatovic 82' (1:1)	FCB summary	(yellow card) 43' Ajeti; 60' (0:1) Xhaka; (yellow card) 70' Elneny	Attendance: 16,468; Referee: (Switzerland) Stephan Klossner

11 August 2013 Round 5	Basel	1–2	Zurich	St. Jakob-Park, Basel
16:00	Streller 7' (1:0); Xhaka (yellow card) 53'; Schär (yellow card) 78'	FCB summary	24' (1:1) Reikan; 58' (1:2) Gavranović; (yellow card) 78' da Costa	Attendance: 28,668; Referee: (Switzerland) Sascha Kever

24 August 2013 Round 6	Luzern	1–1	Basel	Swissporarena, Luzern
19:45	Lezcano (yellow card) 43'; Sarr (yellow card) 51'; Rangelov 90+3' (1:1)	FCB summary	(yellow card) 17' Safari; 32' (0:1) Sio; (yellow card) 34' Xhaka; (yellow card) 85' Ivanov	Attendance: 15,211; Referee: (Switzerland) Nikolaj Hänni

1 September 2013 Round 7	Basel	2–1	Young Boys	St. Jakob-Park, Basel
16:00	Frei (yellow card) 19'; Schär (yellow card) 49'; Voser (yellow card) 54'; Sio 73' (1:1); Streller 74' (2:1)	FCB summary	(yellow card) 22' Nuzzolo; (yellow card) 26' Sutter; (yellow card) 26' Costanzo; (yellow card) 48' von Bergen; 71' (0:1) Afum	Attendance: 32,190; Referee: (Switzerland) Stephan Klossner

22 September 2013 Round 8	Sion	1–3	Basel	Stade Tourbillon, Sion
16:00	Léo Itaperuna 23' (1:0); Kouassi (yellow card) 34' (yellow-red card) 50'; Yartey (yellow card) 82'; Basha (yellow card) 90'	FCB summary	31' (1:1) Stocker; (yellow card) 45+2' Delgado; (yellow card) 54' Díaz; 67' (1:2) Sio; (yellow card) 77' Sommer; 79' (1:3) Streller	Attendance: 10,500; Referee: (Switzerland) Sascha Kever

24 September 2013 Round 9	Thun	0–2	Basel	Arena Thun, Thun
19:45	Ferreira (yellow card) 33'; Lüthi (yellow card) 90+1'	FCB summary	(yellow card) 34' Safari; 56' (0:1) Stocker; 90' (0:2) Díaz	Attendance: 6,000; Referee: (Switzerland) Patrick Graf

28 September 2013 Round 10	Basel	2–2	Sion	St. Jakob-Park, Basel
19:45	Schär (yellow card) 43'; Delgado (yellow card) 53'; Stocker 57' (1:1); Salah 65' (2:1); Safari (yellow card) 90+3'	FCB summary	3' (0:1) Vanczák; (yellow card) 78' Perrier; 87' (2:2) Assifuah	Attendance: 26,256; Referee: (Switzerland) Nikolaj Hänni

5 October 2013 Round 11	Lausanne-Sport	1–2	Basel	Olympique de la Pontaise, Lausanne
16:00	Khelifi 14' (1:0); Katz (yellow card) 50'; De Pierro (yellow card) 93'; Chakhsi (yellow card) 93'	FCB summary	39' (o.g. 1:1) Fickentscher; (red card) 50' Sio; 59' (1:2) Ajeti; (yellow card) 64' Ivanov; (yellow card) 94' Safari	Attendance: 4,950; Referee: (Switzerland) Pascal Erlachner

19 October 2013 Round 12	Basel	3–0	St. Gallen	St. Jakob-Park, Basel
19:45	Frei 28' (1:0); Streller 51' (2:0); Xhaka 63' (3:0)	Summary; FCB summary	(yellow card) 4' Russo	Attendance: 29,440; Referee: (Switzerland) Alain Bieri

27 October 2013 Round 13	Zürich	0–0	Basel	Letzigrund, Zurich
16:00		Summary; FCB summary	(yellow card) 84' Schär; (yellow card) 88' Xhaka; (yellow card) 90' Ajeti	Attendance: 11,778; Referee: (Switzerland) Stephan Studer

2 November 2013 Round 14	Aarau	1–1	Basel	Stadion Brügglifeld, Aarau
19:45	Lüscher (yellow card) 14'; Hallenius 50' (1:0); Jaggy (yellow card) 86'; Martignoni (yellow card) 89'	Summary; FCB summary	(yellow card) 14' Streller; (yellow card) 52' Delgado; 90+3' (1:1) Streller	Attendance: 8,000; Referee: (Switzerland) Pascal Erlachner

23 November 2013 Round 15	Basel	4–1	Thun	St. Jakob-Park, Basel
19:45	Stocker 21' (1:1); Ajeti (yellow card) 32'; Voser 51' (2:1); Streller 75' (3:1); Andrist 90' (4:1)	Summary; FCB summary	13' (0:1) Sulmoni; (yellow card) 84' Zuffi	Attendance: 25,560; Referee: (Switzerland) Sascha Amhof

1 December 2013 Round 16	Young Boys	2–2	Basel	Stade de Suisse, Bern
16:00	Costanzo (yellow card) 21'; Gajic 37' (1:0); Gajic (yellow card) 53'; Kubo 68' (2:2)	FCB summary	40' (1:1) Salah; 44' (1:2) Salah	Attendance: 23,221; Referee: (Switzerland) Nikolaj Hänni

7 December 2013 Round 17	Basel	1–1	Grasshopper Club	St. Jakob-Park, Basel
19:45	Sio (yellow card) 3'; Sio 90+4' (1:1)	FCB summary	(yellow card) 33' I. Hajrović; 36' (0:1) I. Hajrović; (yellow card) 90' Amir Abrashi	Attendance: 28,242; Referee: (Switzerland) Stephan Klossner

14 December 2013 Round 18	Basel	1–1	Luzern	St. Jakob-Park, Basel
19:45	D. Degen (yellow card) 10'; Ajeti (yellow card) 45'; Schär (yellow card) 36' (yellow-red card) 66' (goal) 62' (1:1)	FCB summary	27' (0:1) Wiss; (yellow card) 61' Rangelov; (yellow card) 56' (yellow-red card) 88' Stahel	Attendance: 27,649; Referee: (Switzerland) Nikolaj Hänni

==== Second half of season ====
2 February 2014 Round 19	Lausanne-Sport	1–3	Basel	Olympique de la Pontaise, Lausanne
13:45	Yaya (yellow card) 34'; Ravet (yellow card) 39'; Feindouno 51' (1:1); Feindouno (yellow card) 76'; Facchinetti (yellow card) 90+1'	FCB Summary; Summary	10' (o.g. 0:1) Mevlja; 68' (1:2) Frei; 90+2' (1:3) Degen	Attendance: 4,900; Referee: (Switzerland) Alain Bieri

8 February 2014 Round 20	Basel	3–2	Young Boys	St. Jakob-Park, Basel
19:45	Die (yellow card) 28'; Streller 43' (1:2); Delgado (yellow card) 45'; Mohamed Elneny (yellow card) 45+1'; Xhaka (yellow card) 69'; Díaz 80' (2:2); Frei 89' (pen. 3:2)	FCB Summary; Summary	29' (0:1) Bertone; 33' (0:2) Gerndt; (yellow card) 35' Frey; (yellow card) 62' Rochat; (yellow card) 77' Martínez; (yellow card) 88' Vilotić	Attendance: 27,225; Referee: (Switzerland) Nikolaj Hänni

15 February 2014 Round 21	Basel	1–0	Sion	St. Jakob-Park, Basel
19:45	Xhaka (yellow card) 35'; F. Frei 57' (pen. 1:0)	FCB Summary	(yellow card) 23' Ferati; (yellow card) 28' Rüfli; (yellow card) 57' Kouassi	Attendance: 24,563; Referee: (Switzerland) Stephan Studer

23 February 2014 Round 22	Grasshopper Club	1–1	Basel	Letzigrund, Zurich
16:00	Nzuzi (yellow card) 28'; Grichting (yellow card) 39'; Pavlović 51' (1:0) (yellow card) 75'	FCB Summary; Summary	(yellow card) 37' Callà; (yellow card) 53' Díaz; 57' (1:1) Stocker; (yellow card) 60' Stocker; (yellow card) 87' Mohamed Elneny; (yellow card) 89' Frei	Attendance: 11,700; Referee: (Switzerland) Stephan Klossner

2 March 2014 Round 23	Thun	2–2	Basel	Arena Thun, Thun
13:45	Sulmoni (yellow card) 27'; Ferreira (yellow card) 74'; Wittwer 79' (1:2); Ar. Ajeti 90+3' (o.g. 2:2)	FCB Summary	23' (0:1) Streller; 60' (0:2) P. Degen; (yellow card) 76' Sauro	Attendance: 6,639; Referee: (Switzerland) Sandro Schärer

8 March 2014 Round 24	Basel	1–1	St. Gallen	St. Jakob-Park, Basel
19:45	Callà 79' (1:0)	FCB Summary	(yellow card) 60' Besle; 81' (1:1) Karanović	Attendance: 26,643; Referee: (Switzerland) Alain Bieri (Solothurn)

16 March 2014 Round 25	Basel	5–0	Aarau	St. Jakob-Park, Basel
16:00	Suchý 8' (1:0); Stocker 11' (2:0); Bulvītis 14' (o.g. 3:0); P. Degen 84' (4:0); Embolo 89' (5:0)	FCB Summary		Attendance: 26,421; Referee: (Switzerland) Stephan Klossner

22 March 2014 Round 26	Zurich	0–0	Basel	Letzigrund, Zurich
16:00	Gavranović (yellow card) 32'; Kecojević (yellow card) 56' (yellow-red card) 58'; Rikan (yellow card) 84'	FCB Summary; Summary	(yellow card) 34' Sauro	Attendance: 14,749; Referee: (Switzerland) Nikolaj Hänni

30 March 2014 Round 27	Luzern	0–2	Basel	Swissporarena, Luzern
16:00	Winter (yellow card) 44'; Lustenberger (yellow card) 88'	FCB Summary; Summary	(yellow card) 29' Sio; 51' (0:1) Sio; (yellow card) 85' Aliji; (yellow card) 90' Xhaka; 90+2' (0:2) Sio	Attendance: 15,170; Referee: (Switzerland) Stephan Studer

6 April 2014 Round 28	Basel	0–0	Thun	St. Jakob-Park, Basel
13:45	Schär (yellow card) 89'	FCB Summary; Summary	(yellow card) 11' Schneuwly; (yellow card) 33' Schenkel; (yellow card) 70' Wittwer; (yellow card) 79' Faivre	Attendance: 26,577; Referee: (Switzerland) Amhof Sascha

12 April 2014 Round 29	Sion	0–1	Basel	Stade Tourbillon, Sion
13:45	Fedele (yellow card) 20'; Vaņins (yellow card) 22'	FCB Summary	(yellow card) 22' Suchý; 71' (pen. 0:1) F. Frei; (yellow card) 85' Sauro	Attendance: 8,600; Referee: (Switzerland) Alain Bieri (Solothurn)

16 April 2014 Round 30	Basel	4–2	Zurich	St. Jakob-Park, Basel
20:30	Sio 8' (1:0); Stocker 65' (2:0); Sio 71' (3:0); Delgado (yellow card) 74'; Elneny 88' (4:2)	FCB Summary; Summary	(yellow card) 10' Schönbächler; (yellow card) 37' Buff; (yellow card) 48' Gavranović; 73' (3:1) Pedro Henrique; 78' (3:2) Chikhaoui; (red card) 87' Benito	Attendance: 27,423; Referee: (Switzerland) Sébastien Pache

27 April 2014 Round 31	Basel	1–1	Grasshopper Club	St. Jakob-Park, Basel
16:00	Frei (yellow card) 7'; Stocker 44' (1:1); Die (yellow card) 73'; Callà (yellow card) 80'; Sio (yellow card) 85'	FCB Summary; Summary	(yellow card) 7' Grichting; 36' (0:1) Gashi; (yellow card) 55' Dingsdag; (yellow card) 59' Jahic	Attendance: 34,172; Referee: (Switzerland) Alain Bieri (Solothurn)

4 May 2014 Round 32	St. Gallen	0–3	Basel	AFG Arena, St. Gallen
13:45	Vitkieviez (yellow card) 36'; Nushi (yellow card) 76'; Besle (yellow card) 90'	FCB Summary; Summary	(yellow card) 13' Elneny; 21' (0:1) Stocker; 37' (0:2) Delgado; 56' (0:3)	Attendance: 18,346; Referee: (Switzerland) Sascha Amhof

7 May 2014 Round 33	Basel	3–1	Luzern	St. Jakob-Park, Basel
20:30	Stocker 10' (1:0); Schär 18' (2:0); Suchý (yellow card) 33'; Sio 70' (3:1)	FCB Summary; Summary	38' (2:1) Rangelov; (yellow card) 52' Freuler	Attendance: 25,677; Referee: (Switzerland) Nikolaj Hänni

11 May 2014 Round 34	Young Boys	3–1	Basel	Stade de Suisse, Bern
16:00	Spycher (yellow card) 19'; Steffen 37' (1:0); Costanzo 65' (2:0); Rochat 75' (3:0)	FCB Summary; Summary	(yellow card) 77' Streller; 82' (3:1) Stocker; (yellow card) 90+1' Alliji	Attendance: 20,278; Referee: (Switzerland) Stephan Klossner

15 May 2014 Round 35	Aarau	1–3	Basel	Stadion Brügglifeld, Aarau
20:30	N'Ganga 12' (1:0); Bulvītis (yellow card) 60'; Jäckle (yellow card) 88'	FCB Summary	28' (1:1) Serey Die; 34' (1:2) Delgado; (yellow card) 68' P. Degen; 78' (1:3) Stocker	Attendance: 8,000; Referee: (Switzerland) Stephan Studer

18 May 2014 Round 36	Basel	4–2	Lausanne-Sport	St. Jakob-Park, Basel
16:00	Al. Ajeti 8' (1:0); Callà 59' (2:1); Callà 68' (4:2); Serey Die 90+1' (4:2); Serey Die (yellow card) 90+2'	FCB Summary	48' (1:1) Tafer; 70' (3:2) Coly	Attendance: 32,412 (sold out); Referee: (Switzerland) Fedayi San

==== League table ====
Pos	Team	Pld	W	D	L	GF	GA	GD	Pts	Qualification or relegation
1	Basel (C)	36	19	15	2	70	34	+36	72	Qualification to Champions League group stage
2	Grasshopper	36	19	8	9	67	43	+24	65	Qualification to Champions League third qualifying round
3	Young Boys	36	17	8	11	59	50	+9	59	Qualification to Europa League third qualifying round
4	Luzern	36	15	6	15	48	54	−6	51	Qualification to Europa League second qualifying round
5	Zürich	36	14	8	14	51	52	−1	50	Qualification to Europa League play-off round (Note: Zürich won the 2013–14 Swiss Cup, so therefore qualified for the Play-off round of the 2014–15 UEFA Europa League.)
6	Thun	36	13	9	14	57	53	+4	48	
7	St. Gallen	36	11	12	13	37	47	−10	45	
8	Sion	36	12	7	17	38	45	−7	43	
9	Aarau	36	12	6	18	55	71	−16	42	
10	Lausanne-Sport (R)	36	7	3	26	38	71	−33	24	Relegation to the Swiss Challenge League

Source: Swiss Super League (in German)
Rules for classification: 1) points; 2) goal difference; 3) number of goals scored.
(C) Champions; (R) Relegated
Notes:

Results summary

Overall								Home						Away					
Pld	W	D	L	GF	GA	GD	Pts	W	D	L	GF	GA	GD	W	D	L	GF	GA	GD
36	19	15	2	70	34	+36	72	11	6	1	41	18	+23	8	9	1	29	16	+13

Last updated: 18 May 2014.
Source: Fussballdaten.de

=== Swiss Cup ===
17 August 2013 Round 1	BSC Old Boys	0–1 (a.e.t.)	Basel	Stadion Schützenmatte, Basel
18:00 CEST	Akdemir (yellow card) 34' (yellow-red card) 62'; Müller (yellow card) 89'	FCB summary SFV summary	(yellow card) 83' P. Degen; (yellow card) 84' Sauro; 95' (0:1) Ivan Ivanov	Attendance: 4,384; Referee: (Switzerland) Luca Gut

14 September 2013 Round 2	FC Münsingen	0–1	Basel	Sportanlage Sandreutenen, Münsingen
17:00 CEST	Suter (yellow card) 11'; Fumaro (yellow card) 45'	FCB summary SFV summary	(yellow card) 28' D. Degen; 55' (pen. 0:1) Delgado; (yellow card) 92' Ajeti	Attendance: 4,100 (Stadium record); Referee: (Switzerland) Stephan Studer

10 November 2013 Round 3	FC Tuggen	1–3	Basel	Linthstrasse, Tuggen
14:30	Sandro Gugelmann (yellow card) 16'; Baykal (yellow card) 38'; Peters (yellow card) 53'; Valon Ahmetaj 74' (1:2)	FCB summary Summary	(yellow card) 15' Ajeti; (yellow card) 34' Díaz; (yellow card) 45+2' Sio; 52' (0:1) Salah; (yellow card) 53' Sauro; 59' (0:2) Sio; 82' (1:3) Díaz	Attendance: 6,250 (Stadium record); Referee: (Switzerland) Nikolaj Hänni

4 December 2013 Quarter-final	Le Mont	Postponed	Basel	Terrain du Châtaignier, Le Mont-sur-Lausanne
19:30
Note: Originally scheduled to be played on 4 December in Le Mont, but due to weather conditions and an unplayable pitch, the game was postponed and then played in the St. Jakob-Park

5 February 2014 Quarter-final	Le Mont	1–6	Basel	St. Jakob-Park, Basel
19:30	Morganella (yellow card) 10'; Gabriele (yellow card) 12'; Mejri (yellow card) 61'; Bouziane 89' (1:6)	FCB summary SFV summary	6' (0:1) Andrist; 8' (0:2) Suchý; 45' (0:3) Streller; 48' (0:4) Frei; 58' (0:5) D. Degen; 84' (0:6) Andrist	Attendance: 6,138; Referee: (Switzerland) Patrick Graf

26 March 2014 Semi-final	Basel	1–0	Luzern	St. Jakob-Park, Basel
19:00	Streller (yellow card) 78'; Callà 80' (1:0); P. Degen (yellow card) 81'; Sommer (yellow card) 87'	FCB summary SFV summary	(yellow card) 74' Lezcano; (red card) 90' Freuler	Attendance: 12,668; Referee: (Switzerland) Alain Bieri

Final

21 April 2014
14:00

Zürich	2–0 (a.e.t.)	Basel
Chikhaoui (yellow card) 61'; Buff (yellow card) 83'; Kecojević (yellow card) 95'; Gavranović 110' (1:0); Gavranović 114' (2:0)	FCB summary SFV summary	(yellow card) 62' Elneny; (red card) 66' Sauro; (yellow card) 77' (yellow-red card) 99' Sio; (yellow card) 102' Serey Die

Stade de Suisse, Bern
Attendance: 23'312
Referee: (Switzerland) Patrick GrafRefereesfifa

GK	(Switzerland) David Da Costa
DF	(Portugal) Jorge Teixeira
DF	(Montenegro) Ivan Kecojević	(yellow card) 95'
DF	(Switzerland) Berat Djimsiti
MF	(Switzerland) Oliver Buff	(yellow card) 83'	(substituted off) 86'
MF	(Switzerland) Philippe Koch (cap)
MF	(Switzerland) Davide Chiumiento
MF	(Tunisia) Yassine Chikhaoui	(yellow card) 61'
MF	(Israel) Avi Rikan		(substituted off) 111'
ST	(Switzerland) Mario Gavranović
ST	(Cameroon) Franck Etoundi		(substituted off) 91'
Substitutes:
DF	(Switzerland) Davide Mariani		(substituted on) 86'
MF	(Albania) Armando Sadiku		(substituted on) 91'
FW	(Montenegro) Asmir Kajević		(substituted on) 111'
Manager:
(Switzerland) Urs Meier

GK	(Switzerland) Yann Sommer
DF	(Switzerland) Naser Aliji
DF	(Czech Republic) Marek Suchý
DF	(Argentina) Gastón Sauro	(red card) 66'
DF	(Sweden) Behrang Safari
MF	(Ivory Coast) Serey Die	(yellow card) 102'
MF	(Egypt) Mohamed Elneny	(yellow card) 62'
MF	(Switzerland) Davide Callà		(substituted off) 70'
MF	(Switzerland) Fabian Frei		(substituted off) 60'
MF	(Switzerland) Valentin Stocker (cap)		(substituted off) 106'
ST	(Ivory Coast) Giovanni Sio	(yellow card) 77' (yellow-red card) 99'
Substitutes:
MF	(Argentina) Matías Delgado		(substituted on) 60'
MF	(Switzerland) Arlind Ajeti		(substituted on) 70'
MF	(Chile) Marcelo Díaz		(substituted on) 106'
Manager:
(Switzerland) Murat Yakin

=== UEFA Champions League ===
==== Third qualifying round ====
30 July 2013 1st Leg	Basel (Switzerland)	1–0	(Israel) Maccabi Tel Aviv	St. Jakob-Park, Basel
19:00	Schär (yellow card) 38'; Stocker 39' (1:0); Safari (yellow card) 76'; Ajeti (yellow card) 90+4'	FCB summary UEFA Report	(yellow card) 8' Yeini; (yellow card) 38' Itzhaki; (yellow card) 43' Tibi; (yellow card) 90' Alberman; (yellow card) 90+2' Ben Harush	Attendance: 12,353; Referee: Szymon Marciniak (Poland)

6 August 2013 2nd Leg	Maccabi Tel Aviv (Israel)	3–3	(Switzerland) Basel	Bloomfield Stadium, Tel Aviv
19:00	Carlos García (yellow card) 5'; Prica (yellow card) 13'; Schär 34' (o.g. 1:3); Zahavi 37' (2:3); Radi 55' (3:3); Yitzhaki (yellow card) 68'; Alberman (yellow card) 13'	FCB summary UEFA report	5' (pen. 0:1) Schär; 21' (0:2) Salah; 32' (0:3) Díaz; (yellow card) 40' Stocker; (yellow card) 41' Xhaka; (yellow card) 75' Salah	Attendance: 14,000; Referee: Clément Turpin (France)

Basel won 4–3 on aggregate.

==== Play-off round ====
21 August 2013 1st Leg	Ludogorets Razgrad (Bulgaria)	2–4	(Switzerland) Basel	Vasil Levski National Stadium, Sofia
20:45	Marcelinho 23' (1:1); Júnior Caiçara (yellow card) 34' (yellow-red card) 83'; Stoyanov 50' (2:1)	FCB summary UEFA Report	12' (0:1) Salah; (yellow card) 26' Sio; 59' (2:2) Salah; 64' (2:3) Sio; (yellow card) 69' Safari; (yellow card) 81' Voser; 84' (pen. 2:4) Schär	Attendance: 9,000; Referee: Wolfgang Stark (Germany)

27 August 2013 2nd Leg	Basel (Switzerland)	2–0 (6–2 agg.)	(Bulgaria) Ludogorets Razgrad	St. Jakob-Park, Basel
20:45	Frei 11' (1:0); Schär (yellow card) 24'; Salah (yellow card) 39'; Ajeti (yellow card) 44'; Degen 79' (2:0)	FCB summary UEFA Report	(yellow card) 63' Moti	Attendance: 15,733; Referee: William Collum (Scotland)

==== Group stage ====
Pos	Team	Pld	W	D	L	GF	GA	GD	Pts	Qualification	CHE	SCH	BSL	STE
1	(England) Chelsea	6	4	0	2	12	3	+9	12	Advance to knockout phase	—	3–0	1–2	1–0
2	(Germany) Schalke 04	6	3	1	2	6	6	0	10	Advance to knockout phase	0–3	—	2–0	3–0
3	(Switzerland) Basel	6	2	2	2	5	6	−1	8	Transfer to Europa League	1–0	0–1	—	1–1
4	(Romania) Steaua București	6	0	3	3	2	10	−8	3		0–4	0–0	1–1	—

Source: UEFA

18 September 2013 1	Chelsea (England)	1–2	(Switzerland) Basel	London
20:45	van Ginkel (yellow card) 43'; Oscar 45' (1:0)	FCB summary UEFA Report	(yellow card) 64' Díaz; 71' (1:1) Salah; 82' (1:2) Streller	Stadium: Stamford Bridge; Attendance: 40,358; Referee: Daniele Orsato (Italy); Man of the Match: Mohamed Salah

1 October 2013 2	Basel (Switzerland)	0–1	(Germany) Schalke 04	Basel
20:45	Delgado (yellow card) 89'	FCB summary UEFA Report	(yellow card) 37' Aogo; (yellow card) 38' Farfán; 54' (0:1) Draxler; (yellow card) 65' Höger	Stadium: St. Jakob-Park; Attendance: 33,251; Referee: Alberto Undiano Mallenco (Spain); Man of the Match: Julian Draxler

22 October 2013 3	Steaua București (Romania)	1–1	(Switzerland) Basel	Bucharest
20:45	Georgievski (yellow card) 65'; Szukała (yellow card) 79'; Tatu 88' (1:1)	FCB summary UEFA Report	(yellow card) 19' Schär; (yellow card) 22' Voser; 48' (0:1) Díaz	Stadium: Arena Națională; Attendance: 23,899; Referee: Matej Jug (Slovenia); Man of the Match: Marcelo Díaz

6 November 2013 4	Basel (Switzerland)	1–1	(Romania) Steaua București	Basel
20:45	Ivanov (yellow card) 42'; Schär (yellow card) 80'; D. Degen (yellow card) 86'; Sio 90+1' (1:1)	FCB summary UEFA Report	(yellow card) 11' Szukała; 17' (0:1) Piovaccari; (yellow card) 26' Piovaccari; (yellow card) 41' Bourceanu	Stadium: St. Jakob-Park; Attendance: 30,704; Referee: Olegário Benquerença (Portugal); Man of the Match: Alexandru Bourceanu

26 November 2013 5	Basel (Switzerland)	1–0	(England) Chelsea	Basel
20:45	Xhaka (yellow card) 37'; Serey Die (yellow card) 63'; Salah 87' (1:0)	FCB summary UEFA Report	(yellow card) 65' Mikel; (yellow card) 76' Ramires	Stadium: St. Jakob-Park; Attendance: 35,208; Referee: (France) Stephane Lannoy

11 December 2013 6	Schalke 04 (Germany)	2–0	(Switzerland) Basel	Gelsenkirchen
20:45	Höwedes (yellow card) 29'; Draxler 51' (1:0); Matip (yellow card) 62'; Matip 57' (2:0); Kolašinac (yellow card) 78'	FCB summary UEFA Report	(yellow card) 20' Voser; (red card) 31' Ivanov; (yellow card) 57' F. Frei; (yellow card) 58' Schär; (yellow card) 85' Sio	Stadium: Veltins-Arena; Attendance: 52,093; Referee: Paolo Tagliavento (Italy)

=== UEFA Europa League ===
==== Knockout phase ====
===== Round of 32 =====
The draw was held on 16 December 2013. The first legs were played on 20 February and the second legs were played on 27 February 2014.

20 February 2014 First leg	Maccabi Tel Aviv (Israel)	0–0	(Switzerland) Basel	Bloomfield Stadium, Tel Aviv
21:05	Garcia (yellow card) 20'; Micha (yellow card) 67'; Einbinder (yellow card) 91'	FCB summary UEFA report	(yellow card) 16' Sauro; (yellow card) 65' Ajeti	Attendance: 13,519; Referee: David Fernández Borbalán

27 February 2014 Second leg	Basel (Switzerland)	3–0 (3–0 agg.)	(Israel) Maccabi Tel Aviv	St. Jakob-Park, Basel
19:00	Stocker 17' (1:0); Serey Die (yellow card) 19'; Streller 60' (2:0); Streller 71' (3:0)	FCB summary UEFA report		Attendance: 15,212; Referee: Ivan Bebek (Croatia)

Basel won 3–0 on aggregate.

===== Round of 16 =====
The draw was held on 16 December 2013. The first legs were played on 13 March and the second legs were played on 20 March 2014.

13 March 2014 First leg	Basel (Switzerland)	0–0	(Austria) Red Bull Salzburg	St. Jakob-Park, Basel
19:00	Serey Die (yellow card) 14'; Sio (yellow card) 23'; P. Degen (yellow card) 84'	FCB summary UEFA report	(yellow card) 14' Hinteregger; (yellow card) 20' Mané; (yellow card) 70' Klein	Attendance: 17,027; Referee: Ovidiu Hațegan (Romania)

20 March 2014 Second leg	Red Bull Salzburg (Austria)	1–2 (1–2 agg.)	(Switzerland) Basel	Stadion Salzburg, Wals-Siezenheim
21:05	Soriano 22' (1:0); Rodnei (yellow card) 62'; Ramalho (yellow card) 78'; Alan (yellow card) 54' (red card) 86'; Leitgeb (yellow card) 90+1'	FCB summary UEFA report	(red card) 9' Suchý; (yellow card) 9' Streller; (yellow card) 38' Sio; 50' (1:1) Streller; (yellow card) 54' Ar. Ajeti; 60' (1:2) Sauro; (yellow card) 88' P. Degen	Attendance: 29,320; Referee: Manuel Gräfe (Germany)

Basel won 2–1 on aggregate.

===== Quarter-finals =====
The draw was held on 21 March 2014. The first leg played on 3 April and the second leg played on 10 April 2014.

3 April 2014 First leg	Basel (Switzerland)	3–0	(Spain) Valencia	St. Jakob-Park, Basel
21:05	Serey Die (yellow card) 13'; Delgado 34'; Delgado 38'; Embolo (yellow card) 76'; Stocker 90+1'	FCB summary UEFA report	(yellow card) 19' Senderos	Attendance: 350; Referee: Martin Atkinson (England)

10 April 2014 Second leg	Valencia (Spain)	5–0 (a.e.t.)	(Switzerland) Basel	Mestalla, Valencia
21:05	Feghouli (yellow card) 27'; Alcácer 38'; Vargas 42'; Alcácer 70'; Keita (yellow card) 98'; Vargas (yellow card) 104'; Alcácer 113'; Alcácer (yellow card) 114'; Bernat (yellow card) 115'; Guaita (yellow card) 117'; Bernat 118'	FCB summary UEFA report	(yellow card) 24' Safari; (yellow card) 61' Elneny; (yellow card) 65' Schär; (yellow card) 74' (yellow-red card) 100' Díaz; (yellow card) 104' (yellow-red card) 105' Gastón Sauro; (yellow card) 106' Xhaka	Attendance: 33,152; Referee: Viktor Kassai (Hungary)

Valencia won 5–3 on aggregate.

Notes

1. The Basel v Valencia match was played behind closed doors due to punishment by UEFA.

== Squad statistics ==
=== Appearances and goals ===
No.	Pos	Nat	Player	Total		Super League		Swiss Cup		Champions League	
No.	Pos	Nat	Player	Apps	Goals	Apps	Goals	Apps	Goals	Apps	Goals
Goalkeepers
1	GK	(Switzerland) SUI	Yann Sommer	27	0	17	0	0	0	10	0
18	GK	(Switzerland) SUI	Germano Vailati	4	0	1	0	3	0	0	0
23	GK	(Switzerland) SUI	Mirko Salvi	0	0	0	0	0	0	0	0
Defenders
4	DF	(Switzerland) SUI	Philipp Degen	17	1	10	0	3	0	4	1
5	DF	(Switzerland) SUI	Arlind Ajeti	20	1	13	1	2	0	5	0
13	DF	(Bulgaria) BUL	Ivan Ivanov	4	0	3	0	0	0	1	0
15	DF	(Switzerland) SUI	Kay Voser	27	1	17	1	1	0	9	0
16	DF	(Switzerland) SUI	Fabian Schär	25	5	15	3	0	0	10	2
19	DF	(Sweden) SWE	Behrang Safari	18	0	10	0	1	0	7	0
26	DF	(Argentina) ARG	Gastón Sauro	12	0	5	0	3	0	4	0
27	DF	(Switzerland) SUI	Naser Aliji	1	0	0	0	1	0	0	0
34	DF	(Switzerland) SUI	Taulant Xhaka	27	2	15	2	2	0	10	0
35	DF	(Switzerland) SUI	Fabian Ritter	0	0	0	0	0	0	0	0
Midfielders
7	MF	(Switzerland) SUI	David Degen	10	0	6	0	3	0	1	0
8	MF	(Ivory Coast) CIV	Serey Die	11	0	7	0	0	0	4	0
10	MF	(Argentina) ARG	Matías Delgado	21	1	13	0	2	1	6	0
14	MF	(Switzerland) SUI	Valentin Stocker	26	5	14	4	2	0	10	1
20	MF	(Switzerland) SUI	Fabian Frei	31	2	18	1	3	0	10	1
21	MF	(Chile) CHI	Marcelo Díaz	18	4	9	1	1	1	8	2
28	MF	(Switzerland) SUI	Stephan Andrist	9	1	5	1	3	0	1	0
33	MF	(Egypt) EGY	Mohamed Elneny	23	0	16	0	1	0	6	0
Forwards
9	FW	(Switzerland) SUI	Marco Streller	23	9	14	8	1	0	8	1
30	FW	(Ivory Coast) CIV	Giovanni Sio	18	7	9	4	2	1	7	2
-	FW	(Switzerland) SUI	Admir Seferagic (U-21 Team)	2	0	0	0	2	0	0	0
Players who appeared for Basel but are no longer at the club
6	DF	(Austria) AUT	Aleksandar Dragovic	1	0	1	0	0	0	0	0
11	FW	(Argentina) ARG	Raul Bobadilla	4	1	3	1	0	0	1	0
22	MF	(Egypt) EGY	Mohamed Salah	29	10	18	4	1	1	10	5
24	FW	(North Korea) PRK	Pak Kwang-Ryong	2	0	1	0	1	0	0	0

Last updated: 26 January 2014, 18:05 (UTC)
Source: Squad statistics and Start formations
Only competitive matches.
Using the most used start formation.
Ordered by position on pitch (from back right to front left).

== See also ==
- History of FC Basel
- List of FC Basel players
- List of FC Basel seasons

== Sources ==
- Rotblau: Jahrbuch Saison 2015/2016. Publisher: FC Basel Marketing AG. ISBN 978-3-7245-2050-4
- Rotblau: Jahrbuch Saison 2017/2018. Publisher: FC Basel Marketing AG. ISBN 978-3-7245-2189-1
- Die ersten 125 Jahre / 2018. Publisher: Josef Zindel im Friedrich Reinhardt Verlag, Basel. ISBN 978-3-7245-2305-5
- Season 2013–14 at "Basler Fussballarchiv" homepage
- Switzerland 2013–14 at RSSSF
