= Kay Voser =

Swiss footballer (born 1987)

Personal information
- Full name: Kay Voser
- Date of birth: 4 January 1987 (age 39)
- Place of birth: Baden, Switzerland
- Height: 1.74 m (5 ft 8 1/2 in)
- Position: Defender

Youth career
- –1997: FC Fislisbach
- 1997–2005: Grasshopper Club

Senior career*
Years	Team	Apps	(Gls)
2005–2007	Grasshopper Club U-21	25	(0)
2006–2011	Grasshopper Club	118	(1)
2011–2014	Basel	48	(1)
2014–2016	Fulham	10	(0)
2016	Sion	4	(0)
2016–2018	FC Zürich	30	(0)
2018	Charlotte Independence	25	(2)

International career^{‡}
2002	Switzerland U16	2	(0)
2003	Switzerland U17	6	(0)
2008	Switzerland U20	1	(0)
2007–2008	Switzerland U21	6	(0)
- * Club domestic league appearances and goals as of 09:44, 15 October 2018 (UTC) ‡ National team caps and goals as of 23:38, 1 February 2016 (UTC)

Kay Voser (born 4 January 1987) is a Swiss former professional footballer who played as defender, mainly as left back. He now works as sports journalist.

== Club career ==
=== Grasshopper Club ===
Voser started his youth football with local amateur club FC Fislisbach. In summer 1997 he moved to the youth department of Grasshopper Club, advancing through the ranks and for the 2005–06 season he advanced to their U-21 team, who as the time played in the 1. Liga the fourth tier of Swiss football. During that season he also played three games for their first team under head coach Krasimir Balakov. His debut was on 26 March 2006 as Grasshoppers lost 1–0 at home against Schaffhausen. He then advanced to their first team and played six years for them. At the end of May 2011 his contract expired.

=== Basel ===
On 31 May 2011, Voser moved from GC to Basel on a free transfer, signing a three-year contract. He joined Basel's first team during their 2011–12 season under head coach Thorsten Fink. To the beginning of their 2011–12 season Voser was member of the Basel team that won the 2011 Uhrencup, beating both Hertha Berlin 3–0 and West Ham United 2–1, to lead the table on goal difference above Young Boys. After playing in three test games and in both Uhrencup matches, Voser played his domestic league debut for the club in the away game in the Stadion Wankdorf on 16 July 2011 as Basel played a 1–1 draw with Young Boys. But after just six league matches and one cup match Voser suffered an injury and had to undergo surgery on his foot and this kept him out of training for the remainder of the season. At the end of the 2011–12 season he won the Double with his new club. They won the League Championship title with 20 points advantage. The team won the Swiss Cup, winning the final 4–3 in a penalty shootout against Luzern.

Voser recovered from his foot injury and rejoined the team at the beginning of their 2012–13 season. After playing in two test games, Voser played his Champions League debut in the home game in the St. Jakob-Park on 24 July 2012 as Basel won 3–0 against Flora Tallinn. But again Voser was hampered by injuries. In November/December he missed two months due to a foot injury and then in April one month due to a shoulder injury. Basel had started in the 2012–13 UEFA Champions League in the qualifying rounds. But were knocked out of the competition by CFR Cluj in the play-off round. They then continued in the 2012–13 UEFA Europa League group stage. Ending the group in second position, Basel continued in the knockout phase and advanced as far as the semi-finals, there being matched against the reigning UEFA Champions League holders Chelsea. Chelsea won both games advancing 5–2 on aggregate, eventually winning the competition. At the end of the Swiss Super League season 2012–13 he won the Championship title with the team. In the 2012–13 Swiss Cup Basel reached the final, but were runners up behind Grasshopper Club, being defeated 4–3 on penalties, following a 1–1 draw after extra time.

At the start of their 2013–14 season Voser was member of the Basel team that won the 2013 Uhrencup, beating Red Star Belgrade in the final. Voser scored his first goal for the team in the 2013–14 season on 23 November 2013 in the St. Jakob-Park. It was the team's second goal as they beat Thun 4–1. Basel joined the 2013–14 Champions League in the qualifying rounds and they advanced to the group stage. Finishing in third place in their group, Basel qualified for Europa League knockout phase and here they advanced as far as the quarter-finals. But eventually they were beaten by Valencia 5-3 on aggregate, after extra time. At the end of the 2013–14 Super League season Voser won his third league championship with Basel. The team also reached the final of the Swiss Cup on 21 April 2014. Gastón Sauro and Giovanni Sio were both sent off as Basel fell to rivals FC Zürich 2–0 in added extra time, after a goalless 90 minutes. But Voser could not play due to injury.

On 2 July 2014 Basel announced that Voser had left the club. During his period with the club, Voser played a total of 87 games for Basel scoring one goal. 48 of these games were in the Swiss Super League, five in the Swiss Cup, 13 in the UEFA competitions (Champions League and Europa League) and 21 were friendly games. He scored his only goal in the domestic league, as mentioned above.

=== Fulham ===
On 2 July 2014, Fulham announced they had signed Voser on a two-year deal with an option for a third. The fee was undisclosed. His contract was terminated by mutual consent in February 2016.

=== Sion then Zürich ===
After half a season at FC Sion he signed a two-year contract with FC Zürich in June 2016. Zürich had just been relegated, but at the end of the season they achieved promotion. Voser remained with the club, but was no longer a regular starter in the team.

=== Charlotte Independence ===
On March 6, 2018, Voser signed with American side Charlotte Independence for the 2018 season. Voser left Charlotte at the end of their 2018 season.

== International career ==
Voser played his Swiss U-16 debut on 26 August 2002 in the 2–2 away draw against the German U-16 team. He made his Swiss U-21 debut on 7 February 2007 in the 4–0 away defeat against the French U-21 team.

== Later life ==
From April 2019, Voser completed an internship as a sports journalist at the Tages-Anzeiger. In May 2021 Schweizer Fernsehen announced that they had hired Kay Voser as new member of their Super League expert team.

== Titles and honours ==
Basel

- Swiss Super League champion: 2011–12, 2012–13, 2013–14
- Swiss Cup winner: 2011–12
- Swiss Cup runner-up: 2012–13, 2013–14
- Uhrencup winner: 2011, 2013

Zürich

- Swiss Challenge League champion and promotion: 2016–17

Individual

- Swiss Super League Team of the Year: 2013–14

== Sources ==
- Die ersten 125 Jahre. Publisher: Josef Zindel im Friedrich Reinhardt Verlag, Basel. ISBN 978-3-7245-2305-5
- Verein "Basler Fussballarchiv" Homepage
