= Arlind Ajeti =

Albanian footballer (born 1993)

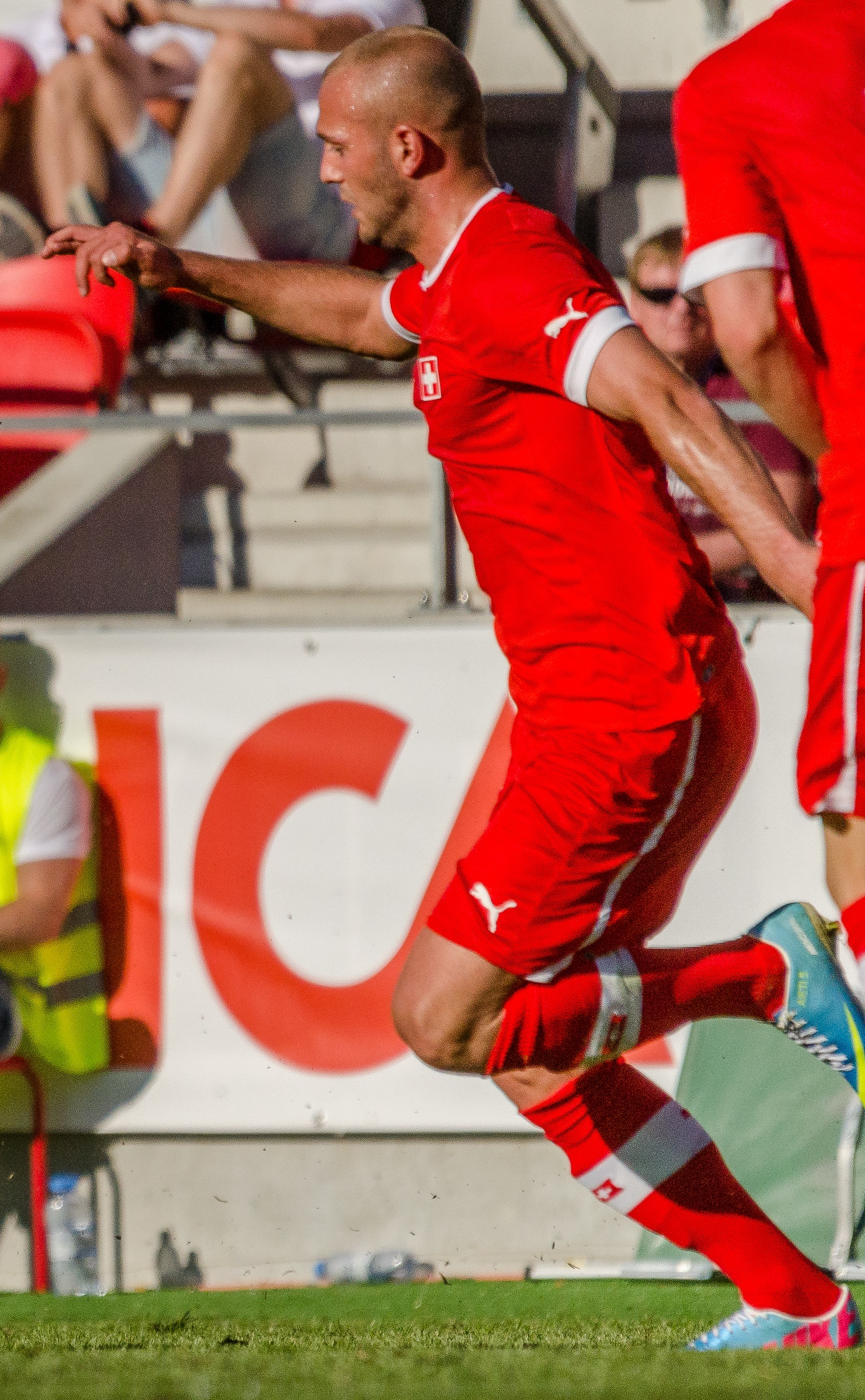
- Ajeti playing for Switzerland U21 in 2013

Personal information
- Date of birth: 25 September 1993 (age 33)
- Place of birth: Basel, Switzerland
- Height: 1.85 m (6 ft 1 in)
- Position: Centre-back

Team information
- Current team: Bodrum
- Number: 5

Youth career
- 2002–2004: Concordia Basel
- 2004–2010: Basel

Senior career*
Years	Team	Apps	(Gls)
2010–2013	Basel U21	67	(4)
2011–2015	Basel	27	(1)
2015–2016	Frosinone	16	(1)
2016–2018	Torino	4	(1)
2017–2018	→ Crotone (loan)	21	(0)
2018–2019	Grasshoppers	16	(2)
2020	Vejle	8	(0)
2020–2021	Reggiana	24	(2)
2021–2022	Padova	17	(1)
2022–2023	Pordenone	32	(6)
2023–2024	CFR Cluj	23	(3)
2024–	Bodrum	68	(5)

International career^{‡}
2010	Switzerland U17	7	(0)
2010–2011	Switzerland U18	5	(0)
2011–2012	Switzerland U19	15	(1)
2012	Switzerland U20	2	(1)
2013–2014	Switzerland U21	12	(1)
2014–	Albania	41	(1)
- * Club domestic league appearances and goals as of 8 November 2026 ‡ National team caps and goals as of 6 June 2026

Arlind Ajeti (Albanian pronunciation: [ˈaɾlind aˈjeti]; born 25 September 1993) is a professional footballer who plays as a centre-back for TFF 1. Lig club Bodrum and the Albania national team.

He began his career in the youth teams of Concordia Basel and Basel, making his senior debut with Basel's first team in 2011. During his time at Basel, he won four consecutive Swiss Super League titles in the 2011–12, 2012–13, 2013–14, and 2014–15 seasons, as well as the Swiss Cup in 2011–12, finishing as runner-up in the following three editions. He also won the Uhren Cup in 2013 and appeared in the 2015–16 UEFA Champions League. Ajeti later played for clubs in Italy, Denmark, Romania, and Turkey, winning the Danish 1st Division with Vejle in 2019–20 to earn promotion to the Danish Superliga and the Coppa Italia Serie C with Padova in 2021–22.

Born in Switzerland, he represented Switzerland at youth level before switching allegiance to Albania in 2014. He has earned over 35 caps and participated in Albania's first-ever UEFA European Championship 2016 and 2024 campaigns. He was named Man of the Match in Albania's 1–0 victory over Romania during the 2016 tournament.

== Early life ==
Ajeti was born in Basel, Switzerland, to Albanian parents originally from Podujevë, Kosovo. He is the eldest son of Afrim and Sylbije Ajeti, who fled Kosovo due to the war; his father, a former amateur goalkeeper, worked as a construction laborer, and his mother as a cleaner. The family lived near Claraplatz in the Kleinbasel district. His younger brothers are twins and professional footballers: Albian, who plays for Basel and the Switzerland national team, and Adonis, who plays for Rapperswil-Jona.

Ajeti's father inspired him to start playing football; at eight, he began training regularly with him before joining Concordia Basel at age ten. In 2004, he joined the Basel youth system, representing the under-16, under-18, and under-21 teams, playing for the latter from 2010–11 until the 2014–15 season in the 1. Liga Promotion, making 67 appearances and scoring 4 goals.

== Club career ==
=== Basel ===
On 2 January 2011, Ajeti signed his first professional contract with Basel on a 2 1/2-year deal and joined the first team for the 2011–12 season in the Swiss Super League. He also played for the Basel under-19 team in the 2011–12 NextGen series, debuting against Tottenham Hotspur on 17 August 2011.

He made his first-team debut in the Swiss Super League on 28 August 2011 as a substitute in a 2–1 home win against Thun. At the end of the 2011–12 season, he won the Double, claiming the 2011–12 Swiss Super League and the Swiss Cup. He made one league appearance and two Swiss Cup appearances, while playing regularly with the U21 squad.

In the 2012–13 Swiss Super League, Ajeti made 4 appearances while mainly playing for the under-21 side, which finished second in the third tier but did not gain promotion to the Swiss Challenge League. At the end of the season, he won the Swiss Championship title and was Swiss Cup runner-up. He made his European debut on 22 November 2012 in the 2012–13 UEFA Europa League Group G match against Sporting Lisboa, coming on as a substitute in the final minute of a 3–0 win.

In the 2013–14 season, Ajeti became a regular in the 2013–14 Swiss Super League, making 19 appearances (14 starts and 5 as a substitute). He scored his first league goal on 5 October 2013 in a 2–1 away win against Lausanne-Sport. At the end of the season, he won his third league championship with Basel. He made one appearance in the quarter-final of the 2013–14 Swiss Cup, as Basel reached the final but were defeated 2–0 after extra time by Zürich. In European competitions, Ajeti played in all matches of the 2013–14 UEFA Champions League qualifying, featuring in the third qualifying round and play-off round as Basel recorded three wins and one draw to reach the group stage. He made four substitute appearances in the 2013–14 UEFA Champions League group stage as the team finished third and advanced to the 2013–14 UEFA Europa League knockout phase. In the Europa League, he played the full 90 minutes in both legs of the round of 32 against Maccabi Haifa and in the first leg of the round of 16 against Red Bull Salzburg, with Basel conceding no goals in those three matches, and provided one assist in the second leg against Salzburg in a 2–1 win as Basel progressed to the quarter-finals.

In the 2014–15 season, Ajeti made limited first-team appearances following managerial changes. He featured in the opening round of the 2014–15 Swiss Super League and mainly played for the Basel U21 side in the 1. Liga Promotion, appearing regularly before being recalled to the first team near the end of the season. Basel won the league title for the sixth consecutive season. He made one appearance in the 2014–15 Swiss Cup, playing 32 minutes in the quarter-final during a 6–1 away win against Münsingen on 4 March 2015. He also made one appearance in the 2014–15 UEFA Champions League group stage, playing 16 minutes in the Group B match against Ludogorets on 22 October 2014. Basel played a total of 65 matches across all competitions, and under Paulo Sousa Ajeti made 17 appearances: 3 in the league, 2 in the Swiss Cup, 1 in the Champions League, and 11 in friendly matches.

In summer 2015, Ajeti left Basel after his contract expired, as the club chose not to renew his deal amid strong competition in defence and limited first-team opportunities. He made more than 50 official appearances for the club across all competitions, scoring once.

=== Frosinone ===
On 24 November 2015, after six months as a free agent following the expiration of his contract with Basel, Ajeti signed a contract until the end of the season with newly promoted Serie A side Frosinone. He was assigned the squad number 93, corresponding to his year of birth, and was presented to the media two days later.

He received his first call-up on 6 December 2015 for the match against Chievo Verona at the Stadio Matusa, remaining an unused substitute. He made his debut on 6 January 2016 against Sassuolo, starting the match and scoring an own goal in the 22nd minute before later netting Frosinone's second goal in an eventual 2–2 draw.

During the second half of the 2015–16 season, Ajeti established himself in the starting line-up, making 13 full 90-minute appearances and three additional appearances as a second-half substitute. At the end of the season, Frosinone were relegated to Serie B. His contract with Frosinone ended on 30 June, as his renewal was only valid if the club had remained in Serie A.

=== Torino ===
On 7 July 2016, Torino completed the signing of Ajeti on a free transfer. He signed a three-year contract, with the option to extend for a further two years; his salary was reported to be €500,000 per season.

Ajeti missed the start of the 2016–17 Serie A season after suffering a double injury to his right calf in August, which kept him out of action for around two months. On 17 October 2016, he returned to the matchday squad, remaining an unused substitute in Torino's 4–1 away win against Palermo. He made his debut on 30 November 2016 in a 4–0 win over Pisa in the 2016–17 Coppa Italia, playing the full 120 minutes. Ajeti decided to remain at Torino during the winter transfer window, despite transfer speculation, opting to compete for a place in the starting lineup. Ajeti made his Serie A debut for Torino on 5 February 2017 against Empoli, starting and completing the full 90-minutes in a 1–1 draw. A week later he scored his first goal against Pescara in the 9th minute to make it 2–0; he later conceded an own goal, with Torino winning the match 5–3. Throughout the season, under head coach Siniša Mihajlović, Ajeti struggled to secure a regular starting position, partly due to injury setbacks and competition in defence, making only limited appearances, with some reports describing his spell at the club as below expectations and attributing his reduced playing time to tactical preferences and squad hierarchy.

==== Loan to Crotone ====
On 1 August 2017, Ajeti was loaned to fellow Serie A team Crotone until the end of the 2017–18 season, with an option to buy. Ajeti made his debut on 27 August 2017 in the matchday 2 against Hellas Verona, playing the full 90 minutes in a goalless draw. Ajeti established himself as a regular starter, often playing the full 90 minutes, before experiencing a more reduced role in the latter part of the season. On 16 September 2017, Ajeti played 66 minutes against Inter, during which Inter did not score any goals; he was substituted due to injury before the team conceded twice late in the game. On 24 September 2017, Ajeti started in Crotone's 2–0 away win in matchday 6 against Benevento, the club's first league victory of the season; he was praised for his defensive performance in the match, being described as nearly unstoppable for opposing attackers and included in the Serie A Team of the Week for the third time in six weeks. On 17 December 2017, he provided an assist for Ante Budimir in a 1–0 win against Chievo. In December 2017, Italian outlets reported that Ajeti was enjoying a strong run of form at Crotone, describing him as increasingly influential in defence and noting that his market value had risen to an estimated €3 million. In March 2018, according to statistical analyses published in Italy, Ajeti was rated as the highest-performing defender in Serie A for home matches, with an average match rating of 6.58, ahead of several established defenders in the league. At the end of the season, Crotone were relegated and did not exercise the option to purchase his contract.

On 20 August 2018, Ajeti became a free agent after terminating his contract with Torino, which had been set to run until 2019.

=== Grasshoppers ===
On 13 September 2018, Ajeti signed a one-year contract with Grasshoppers, with an option to extend for two more years, returning to Switzerland after three years abroad.

Shortly after joining Grasshoppers, Ajeti suffered a shoulder injury during a match against Basel on 5 November 2018 after a collision with his brother Albian Ajeti; he was ruled out of action for four weeks as a result.

In the 2018–19 Swiss Super League season, he made 16 league appearances and scored 2 goals, and was at times recognized in media coverage for strong individual performances, including being named in the "Team of the Week" after a win against St. Gallen on 26 November 2018.

In March 2019, under new coach Tomislav Stipić, Ajeti was excluded from the first team and spent the remainder of the season outside the senior squad before leaving at the end of the season.

=== Vejle BK ===
On 18 February 2020, Danish 1st Division club Vejle Boldklub confirmed the signing of Ajeti on a deal until the end of the 2019–20 season. He made his debut for the club on 21 February 2020 in a league match against Fredericia, ended in a 1–2 away victory. On 21 June 2020, Ajeti scored an own goal in a 5–3 home win against Hvidovre after diverting the ball into his own net following a cross from the left side. During the second half of the 2019–20 Danish 1st Division season, Ajeti made 8 league appearances and Vejle finished first in the Danish 1st Division and secured promotion to the Danish Superliga.

=== Reggiana ===
On 18 September 2020, Ajeti left Vejle and returned to Italy, signing a two-year contract with Reggiana in Serie B. Ajeti established himself as a starter during the 2020–21 Serie B season, making 22 starts and two substitute appearances, receiving seven yellow cards and one red card. On 23 January 2021, Ajeti scored his first goal for the club in his 11th league appearance, netting the opener in a 2–1 home win against Vicenza. On 1 May 2021, he scored the only goal in a 1–0 home win against Pordenone, securing three points for Reggiana. Reggiana finished 18th in the standings and were relegated to Serie C.

=== Padova ===
On 16 November 2021, Ajeti signed with Padova in Serie C on a one-year contract with an option to extend for a further season. Ajeti established himself as a regular starter for Padova during the 2021–22 Serie C season, making 17 league appearances throughout the campaign. On 1 February 2022, Ajeti scored a late winner in the 87th minute in an away match against Pergolettese, heading in from a cross to secure victory for Padova. Padova qualified for the promotion play-offs, where Ajeti was nearly ever-present across the five matches as the club reached the final before being defeated 1–0 by Palermo. On 14 June 2023, Italian media reported that Ajeti was set to leave Pordenone amid the club's financial difficulties.

=== Pordenone ===
On 12 July 2022, Ajeti joined Pordenone on a two-year deal, remaining in Serie C.

On 19 November 2022, Ajeti scored the decisive goal in a 1–0 home win over Novara in the 2022–23 Serie C (Group A) matchday 14, securing three points for Pordenone. On 30 November 2022, Ajeti scored twice in a 2–2 draw against Pro Patria on matchday 16. On 15 March 2023, Ajeti scored in a 2–1 win over Piacenza on matchday 32, marking his fifth league goal of the season. During the season, Ajeti made 33 league appearances, starting the vast majority of matches and scoring six goals, as Pordenone finished second in the standings. Pordenone qualified for the promotion play-offs, where Ajeti played the full 90 minutes in their quarter-final match against Lecco on 31 May 2023, but the club were eliminated at that stage.

=== CFR Cluj ===
On 11 July 2023, following the expiration of his contract with Pordenone, Ajeti signed a three-year contract with Romanian club Cluj.

Ajeti made his debut in the second qualifying round of the 2023–24 UEFA Europa Conference League, featuring in both matches against Adana Demirspor, as Cluj were eliminated 3–2 on aggregate. His performances in the tie were noted by the Turkish club's president, who publicly praised him after the match where also asked him to join his club in the future. Ajeti made his debut in the 2023–24 Liga I season on 15 July 2023 in the opening match against Poli Iași, playing the full 90 minutes in a 2–0 win, and becoming a regular starter, often completing full matches, finishing the season with 21 appearances, 19 of them full 90 minutes, and 2 as a starter substituted in the second half. On 11 November 2023, Ajeti scored his first goal in a 3–3 away draw against Poli Iași in the 2023–24 Liga I season. On 3 March 2024, Ajeti scored an important goal in a 1–1 away draw against Farul Constanța, earning his team a valuable point. Then, in the championship phase, Ajeti spent most matches on the bench, making a single appearance on 5 May 2024 in Round 8 against Rapid București, coming on in the final minute of a 3–2 win. Cluj finished the league season as runners-up, qualifying for the 2024–25 UEFA Conference League second qualifying round.

Having featured in only one match during the 2024–25 season, on 9 September 2024 it was reported that Cluj had accepted an offer from Turkish club Bodrum, despite Ajeti being under contract with Cluj until June 2025.

=== Bodrum ===
On 10 September 2024, Ajeti was transferred to Bodrum in the Süper Lig for a reported fee of €300,000. He made his debut on 14 September 2024 in Round 5 of the 2024–25 Süper Lig against İstanbul Başakşehir, playing the full 90 minutes in a 0–1 home defeat. He established himself as a regular starter, playing 29 league matches, completing the majority of them and being substituted off only twice in the second half. On 7 October 2024, Ajeti was named in the "Team of the Week" following a good performance in a 0–0 draw with Kasımpaşa, having been rated 7.6 for his display. On 3 February 2025, Ajeti was named in the "Team of the Week" after a strong defensive performance in Bodrum's goalless draw against Göztepe, with his interventions highlighted as key in keeping a clean sheet. He made his debut in the Turkish Cup on 2 April 2025 in the quarter-final against Trabzonspor, playing the full 120 minutes in a 3–2 loss, which was his only cup appearance that season. At the end of the season Bodrum finished 16th and were relegated from the top flight.

On 26 August 2025, Ajeti was named in the "Team of the Week" for the matchday 3 of the 2025–26 TFF 1. Lig after scoring in a 3–1 win over Sakaryaspor. On 8 February 2026, after serving a two-match suspension, he returned to action by scoring twice in an away match against Adana Demirspor, taking his season tally to three goals. On 23 March 2026, Ajeti was named in the "Team of the Week" for matchday 32, after providing an assist in a 1–0 away win over İstanbulspor, setting up the only goal scored by Taulant Seferi.

On 8 November 2026, Ajeti scored the opening goal with a header in a 2–1 away win over Boluspor in the 2026–27 TFF 1. Lig.

== International career ==
=== Switzerland youth ===
Ajeti represented the Switzerland U17, including at the 2010 UEFA European Under-17 Championship, and later featured for the Switzerland U18, Switzerland U19, Switzerland U20 and Switzerland U21 sides in friendly and qualifying matches between 2010 and 2014.

=== Albania: Debut, citizenship and historic UEFA Euro 2016 qualification ===
Following the abandoned Serbia v Albania match on 14 October 2014, during which Albania players defended their national symbols amid on-field incidents, several footballers of Albanian descent expressed their willingness to represent Albania, with Ajeti reported as the first to publicly state his intention to choose Albania at senior level.

He made his debut for Albania on 14 November 2014 in the "UEFA Euro 2016 qualifying Group I centralised" friendly match against the hosts of Euro 2016 finals, France, coming on as a substitute in the 69th minute in place of Amir Abrashi. On 5 March 2015, Ajeti was granted Albanian citizenship, along with fellow Basel defender Naser Aliji, making him eligible to represent Albania in official competitive matches. In the absence of regular centre-back Mërgim Mavraj, Ajeti played the full matches in the qualifying Group I campaign, helping Albania achieve a goalless draw away against Denmark and a 0–1 home defeat against Portugal. Albania subsequently secured historic qualification for Euro 2016 finals in France, marking the nation's first appearance at a major international tournament.

On 21 May 2016, Ajeti was named in Albania's preliminary 27-man squad for UEFA Euro 2016, and subsequently in the final 23-man squad on 31 May, where he was assigned shirt number 18. On 28 May 2016, he scored his first international goal in a Euro 2016 warm-up match against Qatar, contributing to a 3–1 victory.

Ajeti was an unused substitute in Albania's opening UEFA Euro 2016 match against Switzerland, a 1–0 defeat. He started the second match against hosts France following the dismissal of Lorik Cana, and was substituted in the 85th minute due to injury in a 2–0 defeat after Albania conceded two late goals. In the third match against Romania on 19 June, Ajeti started and Albania kept a clean sheet in a 1–0 victory. Throughout the tournament, Albania did not concede a goal while Ajeti was on the pitch. Albania finished third in Group A with three points and a –2 goal difference and were eliminated after ranking last among the third-placed teams.

=== Post–Euro 2016 ===
Ajeti remained part of the national team setup and featured during the 2018 FIFA World Cup qualifying campaign; however, following the departure of coach Gianni De Biasi, he was no longer a regular starter due to increased competition in defence, and in subsequent years his involvement with the national team became more limited despite further managerial changes.

During the Euro 2024 qualifying campaign, under newly appointed coach Sylvinho, Ajeti made a single appearance, playing the full 90 minutes in a 3–0 win against the Czech Republic on 12 October 2023 (matchday 7). Albania qualified once again for a major European tournament, finishing as group winners for the first time in their history.

He was named in Albania's 26-man squad for the final UEFA Euro 2024 tournament in Germany. In UEFA Euro 2024 Group B, Ajeti returned as a regular starter under coach Sylvinho, forming a centre-back partnership with captain Berat Djimsiti. Albania initially suffered a 2–1 defeat to Italy and drew 2–2 with Croatia, taking the lead in both matches, before losing 1–0 to Spain in their final group game, and finished bottom of the group.

During the 2026 FIFA World Cup qualification – UEFA Group K, Ajeti made six appearances, all playing the full 90 minutes, and after Albania conceded twice in the opening 2–0 defeat to England, the team kept clean sheets in the subsequent matches in which he featured for the full duration. On 11 October 2025, Albania defeated Serbia 1–0 at the Dubočica Stadium in Leskovac during the decisive phase of the qualifying campaign, with Rey Manaj scoring the winner after a deflected ball involving Ajeti, strengthening Albania's position in the race for qualification ahead of their direct group rivals. Albania eventually finished second in the group with 14 points, one ahead of Serbia, and qualified for the UEFA play-offs for the first time in their history. Ajeti started the play-offs semi-final against Poland on 26 March 2026, playing the first 15 minutes before a forced substitution due to an injury while attempting a header, and without him on the field Albania, which took a 1–0 lead at halftime, conceded twice in the second half to lose 2–1 and be eliminated from the World Cup.

== Personal life ==
Ajeti has stated that his favourite player is Gerard Piqué, whom he considered the best in the world in his position.

In June 2015, Ajeti married Pranvera Krasniqi. Despite being born and raised in Switzerland, Ajeti and his brothers have knowledge of the Albanian language and have stated that they mostly communicated in Albanian in their private life. In July 2015, Ajeti and his family were granted Albanian citizenship.

Following Albania's historic participation at UEFA Euro 2016, Ajeti was among the members of the national team who were issued diplomatic passports by the Albanian government in recognition of their achievement.

== Career statistics ==
=== Club ===
As of 8 November 2026

Appearances and goals by club, season and competition
Club	Season	League			Cup		Europe (Note: Including continental competitions, such as UEFA Champions League and UEFA Europa League)		Other		Total	
Club	Season	Division	Apps	Goals	Apps	Goals	Apps	Goals	Apps	Goals	Apps	Goals
Basel U21	2010–11	1. Liga Promotion	23	1	—		—		—		23	1
Basel U21	2011–12	1. Liga Promotion	18	1	—		—		—		18	1
Basel U21	2012–13	1. Liga Promotion	12	0	—		—		—		12	0
Basel U21	2013–14	1. Liga Promotion	11	2	—		—		—		11	2
Basel U21	2014–15	1. Liga Promotion	3	0	—		—		—		3	0
Basel U21	Total		67	4	—		—		—		67	4
Basel	2011–12	Swiss Super League	1	0	2	0	—		—		3	0
Basel	2012–13	Swiss Super League	4	0	3	0	1 (Note: Appearance(s) in UEFA Europa League)	0	—		8	0
Basel	2013–14	Swiss Super League	19	1	4	0	12 (Note: Eight appearances in UEFA Champions League, four appearances in UEFA Europa League)	0	—		35	1
Basel	2014–15	Swiss Super League	3	0	2	0	1 (Note: All appearance(s) in UEFA Champions League)	0	—		6	0
Basel	Total		27	1	11	0	14	0	—		53	1
Frosinone	2015–16	Serie A	16	1	—		—		—		16	1
Torino	2016–17	Serie A	4	1	1	0	—		—		5	1
Crotone	2017–18	Serie A	21	0	2	0	—		—		23	0
Grasshoppers	2018–19	Swiss Super League	16	2	0	0	—		—		16	2
Vejle	2019–20	Danish 1st Division	8	0	—		—		—		8	0
Reggiana	2020–21	Serie B	24	2	1	0	—		—		25	2
Padova	2021–22	Serie C	17	1	4	0	—		5 (Note: Appearance(s) in Serie C play-offs)	0	26	1
Pordenone	2022–23	Serie C	32	6	—		—		1	0	33	6
CFR Cluj	2023–24	Liga I	22	3	1	0	2	0	—		25	3
CFR Cluj	2024–25	Liga I	1	0	—		—		—		1	0
CFR Cluj	Total		23	3	1	0	2	0	—		26	3
Bodrum	2024–25	Süper Lig	29	0	1	0	—		—		30	0
Bodrum	2025–26	TFF 1. Lig	33	4	0	0	—		—		33	4
Bodrum	2026–27	TFF 1. Lig	6	1	0	0	—		—		6	1
Bodrum	Total		68	5	1	0	—		—		69	5
Career total			323	26	20	0	16	0	6	0	366	26

=== International ===
As of 6 June 2026

Appearances and goals by national team and year
National team	Year	Apps	Goals
Albania	2014	2	0
Albania	2015	5	0
Albania	2016	5	1
Albania	2017	6	0
Albania	2018	2	0
Albania	2019	0	0
Albania	2020	0	0
Albania	2021	1	0
Albania	2022	1	0
Albania	2023	2	0
Albania	2024	8	0
Albania	2025	6	0
Albania	2026	3	0
Total		41	1

Scores and results list Albania's goal tally first, score column indicates score after each Ajeti goal.

List of international goals scored by Arlind Ajeti
No.	Date	Venue	Cap	Opponent	Score	Result	Competition
1	29 May 2016	Stadion Hartberg, Hartberg, Austria	9	Qatar	1–1	3–1	Friendly

== Honours ==
Basel

- Swiss Super League: 2011–12, 2012–13, 2013–14, 2014–15
- Swiss Cup: 2011–12
- Uhren Cup: 2013

Vejle

- Danish 1st Division: 2019–20

Padova

- Coppa Italia Serie C: 2021–22

Individual

- UEFA Euro 2016 Group A - Romania vs Albania: Man of the Match
