= Serey Dié =

Ivorian footballer (born 1984)

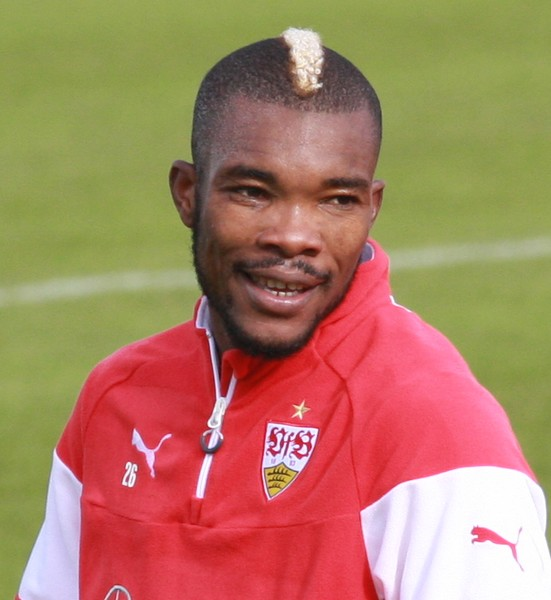
- Dié with VfB Stuttgart in 2015

Personal information
- Full name: Sereso Geoffroy Gonzaroua Dié
- Date of birth: 7 November 1984 (age 42)
- Place of birth: Facobly, Ivory Coast
- Height: 1.79 m (5 ft 10 in)
- Position: Defensive midfielder

Youth career
- 1998–2001: Centre Nationale des Sports de Haut Niveau

Senior career*
Years	Team	Apps	(Gls)
2001–2002	Volcan Junior		
2002–2003	CO Korhogo		
2003–2006	Stade d'Abidjan		
2006–2007	EO Goulette et Kram		
2007–2008	ES Sétif	11	(1)
2008–2012	Sion	115	(4)
2013–2015	Basel	43	(3)
2015–2016	VfB Stuttgart	36	(1)
2016–2019	Basel	52	(3)
2019	→ Neuchâtel Xamax (loan)	12	(2)
2019–2020	Aarau	10	(0)
2020	Neuchâtel Xamax	5	(1)
2020–2022	Sion	34	(1)

International career
2013–2022	Ivory Coast	61	(2)

Managerial career
- 2022: FC Bramois (youth)
Medal record
Representing Ivory Coast
Men's football
Africa Cup of Nations
Winner	2015 Guinea
- * Club domestic league appearances and goals

Sereso Geoffroy Gonzaroua Dié (born 7 November 1984), known as Serey Dié, is an Ivorian former professional footballer who played as a defensive midfielder for the Ivory Coast national team. His last club was Sion. He quietly and secretly resigned, as can be seen from the transfer overview of the Swiss Football League.

== Club career ==
=== Early career ===
Born in Facobly, Serey Dié started his football career with Centre National des Sports de Haut Niveau in Abidjan. He played one year for Volcan Junior and one year for CO Korhogo, before moving to top team Stade d'Abidjan in 2003. Three years later, he moved to EO Goulette et Kram in Tunisia. But this was also to remain a short stay, he cancelled his contract himself after just half a year.

=== ES Sétif ===
Serey Dié was invited for a trial with ES Sétif, and therefore moved to Algeria. This adventure nearly started and ended as a farce on the same day. As the club's president saw Serey Dié, he thought that the wrong player had been hired and sent him home. The coach asked Serey Dié to stay for the training, which he did and in a test match, he was able to convince the club's management to let him stay for a six-month trial. During this trial period, Serey Dié played well and ES Sétif won the 2007–08 Arab Champions League, but he refused to sign the contract that he was subsequently offered.

=== Sion ===
Between 2008 and 2012, Serey Dié played for Sion, with whom he won the Swiss Cup twice. During March 2010, he came under suspicion of corruption in connection with betting manipulation. In May 2012, he was the subject of controversy after cameras filmed him slapping a thirteen-year-old ball-boy in the face. This was during the away game against FC Lausanne-Sport on 2 May. This assault resulted in an eight match suspension.

=== Basel ===
On 13 December 2012, Basel announced the signing of Serey Dié on a three-and-a-half-year contract. He joined Basel's first team during the winter break of their 2013–14 season under head coach Murat Yakin. He made his debut for Basel on 10 February 2013, in a 3–0 home win in St. Jakob-Park against his former club, Sion. He scored his first goal for Basel, the first goal of the match, in a 4–0 away win against Luzern in the Swissporarena, on 1 April 2013. At the end of the Swiss Super League season 2012–13 Serey Dié won the Championship title with the team. In the 2012–13 Swiss Cup Basel reached the final, but were runners up behind Grasshopper Club, being defeated 4–3 on penalties, following a 1–1 draw after extra time. In the 2012–13 UEFA Europa League, Basel advanced as far as the semi-finals, there being matched against the reigning UEFA Champions League holders Chelsea. Chelseas won both games and 5–2 on aggregate.

At the end of the 2013–14 Super League season Serey Dié won the league championship with Basel. The team also reached the final of the 2013–14 Swiss Cup, but were beaten 2–0 by Zürich after extra time. Basel joined the 2013–14 Champions League in the qualifying rounds and they advanced to the group stage. Finishing in third place in their group, Basel qualified for Europa League knockout phase and here they advanced as far as the quarter-finals. But eventually they were beaten by Valencia 5–3 on aggregate, after extra time. In their 2013–14 season, Basel played a total of 68 matches (36 Swiss League fixtures, 6 Swiss Cup, 6 Champions League and 10 Europa League and 10 test matches). Serey Dié totaled 38 appearances, 22 League, 3 Cup, 4 Champions League and 5 Europa League as well 4 in the test games. He scored 2 goals in these matches.

The season 2014–15 was a successful one for Basel. However, Serey Dié's season was an unlucky and unthankful one under the new trainer Paulo Sousa. Despite the fact that Basel won the championship for the sixth time in a row that season and despite that Basel had entered the Champions League in the group stage, reaching the knockout phase on 9 December 2014, as they managed a 1–1 draw at Anfield against Liverpool, Serey Dié totaled just 13 appearances during the first half of the season (7 League, 2 Cup, and just 2 in the Champions League, as well 2 further appearances in test games). Because Sousa did not rely on Serey Dié as a regular player, he was forced to leave the club and they club announced that he moved to Stuttgart on 2 February 2015.

=== VfB Stuttgart ===
On 2 February 2015, Serey Dié moved to Stuttgart. After returning victorious from the 2015 Africa Cup of Nations, he featured in all but one of Stuttgart's remaining games, becoming a key member of the midfield. On 15 July 2016, Stuttgart announced that Serey Dié would return to Basel.

=== Return to Basel ===
Basel confirmed the transfer on the same day, stating that Serey Dié had signed a two-year contract. He joined Basel's first team for their 2016–17 season under head coach Urs Fischer. At the end of the season, Serey Dié won the Swiss championship for the fourth time in his career. For the club, this was the eighth title in a row and their 20th championship title in total. They also won the 2016–17 Swiss Cup, defeating Sion 3–0 in the final, which meant they had won the double.

In Basel's 2017–18 season Raphaël Wicky was appointed as new head coach. In the domestic league Basel ended the season in second position and in the Cup they reached the semi-final only to be defeated by Young Boys. The team entered the Champions League in the group stage, ending this in second position in the table. In the second half of the season Serey Dié was loaned out to Xamax. Basel stated that the Africa-Cup was the reason for Serey Dié's move. The player himself stated "I couldn’t risk not playing as much with FCB in the 2nd half of the season. With regular appearances for Xamax I will be able to help my new club achieve their goals, as well preparing myself for the Africa-Cup with the Ivory Coast this summer."

Following his loan period and his appearances at the 2019 Africa Cup of Nations, Basel and Serey Dié decided to dissolve their contract. Between the years 2012 to 2015 and again 2016 to 2019 Serey Dié played a total of 168 games for Basel scoring a total of six goals. 95 of these games were in the Swiss Super League, 15 in the Swiss Cup, 31 in the UEFA competitions (Champions League and Europa League) and 27 were friendly games. He scored all six goals in the domestic league.

=== Aarau and Xamax ===
Serey Dié had a short spell with Aarau and another short spell with Xamax.

=== Return to Sion ===
On 26 May 2020 it was confirmed, that Serey Dié had returned to the side where he started his European career seven years earlier, FC Sion. Serey Dié signed a two-year deal. During the 2021–22 Super League season Serey Dié quietly and secretly resigned from his active football career, as can be seen from the transfer overview of the Swiss Football League.

== International career ==
He represented Ivory Coast on 50 occasions between 2013 and 2019, scoring 2 goals.

== Personal life ==
At the 2014 FIFA World Cup, during Ivory Coast's match against Colombia, Dié was shown crying during the national anthem before the match. Despite rumors of his emotional feelings were for his father's death, this was inaccurate; Dié himself claimed that he did think about his father (who died in 2004), but that the emotion came from the intensity and excitement he felt while representing his national team.

== Coaching career ==
After his retirement, Dié was hired as a youth coach at FC Bramois in September 2022.

== Career statistics ==
=== International ===
As of match played 26 January 2022

Ivory Coast
Year	Apps	Goals
2013	4	0
2014	9	0
2015	13	0
2016	5	0
2017	8	1
2018	5	0
2019	8	1
2020	2	0
2021	3	0
2022	4	0
Total	61	2

==== International goals ====
Scores and results list Ivory Coast's goal tally first.

No.	Date	Venue	Opponent	Score	Result	Competition
1.	20 January 2017	Stade d'Oyem, Oyem, Gabon	DR Congo	2–2	2–2	2017 Africa Cup of Nations
2.	1 July 2019	30 June Stadium, Cairo, Egypt	Namibia	2–0	4–1	2019 Africa Cup of Nations

== Honours ==
ES Sétif

- Arab Champions League: 2007–08

FC Sion

- Swiss Cup: 2008–09, 2010–11

FC Basel

- Swiss Super League: 2012–13, 2013–14, 2014–15, 2016–17
- Swiss Cup: 2016–17
- Uhren Cup: 2013

Ivory Coast

- Africa Cup of Nations: 2015
