= Admir Seferagić =

Swiss footballer (born 1994)

Personal information
- Date of birth: 27 October 1994 (age 32)
- Place of birth: Tiol, Switzerland
- Height: 1.84 m (6 ft 0 in)
- Positions: Forward; winger; attacking midfielder

Team information
- Current team: Möhlin-Riburg
- Number: 22

Youth career
- –2012: Basel

Senior career*
Years	Team	Apps	(Gls)
2012–2013	Basel U-21	24	(6)
2013–2014	Basel	1	(0)
2014–2016	Schaffhausen	32	(2)
2017–2019	Kriens	33	(10)
2019	Young Fellows Juv.	6	(2)
2019–2020	Cham	5	(0)
2020–2021	Rotkreuz	8	(2)
2021	Langenthal	4	(0)
2022	Willisau		
2022–2023	Rothrist		
2023	Muri	8	(0)
2023–	Möhlin-Riburg		
- * Club domestic league appearances and goals as of 20:25, 28 December 2023 (UTC)

Admir Seferagić (born 27 October 1994) is a Swiss footballer who plays as a forward for Möhlin-Riburg in the 5th tier 2. Liga Interregional.

== Career ==
Admir Seferagić made his professional debut for Basel on 17 August 2013 in the Swiss Cup against BSC Old Boys. He replaced Stephan Andrist after 74 minutes in a 1–0 away win. Ivan Ivanov scored the only goal for FC Basel in overtime. At the end of the 2013–14 Super League season he won the league championship with Basel. They also reached the final of the 2013–14 Swiss Cup, but were beaten 2–0 by Zürich after extra time. During the 2013–14 Champions League season Basel reached the group stage and finished the group in third position. Thus they qualified for Europa League knockout phase and here they advanced as far as the quarter-finals.

On 19 May 2014 Basel announced that Seferagić transferred to Schaffhausen. It was confirmed on 15 December 2016, that he was released by the club.

Ahead of the 2019–20 season, Seferagić joined SC Young Fellows Juventus. However, he left the club again after six games and two goals, and was announced as a new SC Cham player on 18 September 2019.

== Honours ==
Basel

- Swiss Super League: 2013–14
- Swiss Cup runner-up: 2013–14
