= Naser Aliji =

Albanian footballer (born 1993)

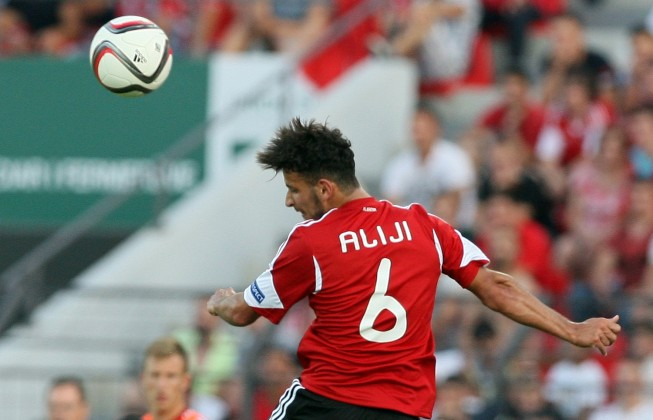
- Aliji in action with Albania in 2015

Personal information
- Full name: Naser Ismail Aliji
- Date of birth: 27 December 1993 (age 32)
- Place of birth: Kumanovo, Macedonia
- Height: 1.77 m (5 ft 10 in)
- Positions: Left-back; centre-back

Team information
- Current team: Dinamo City
- Number: 27

Youth career
- 1998–2004: Baden
- 2004: Team Limmattal
- 2004–2008: Aarau
- 2008–2013: Basel

Senior career*
Years	Team	Apps	(Gls)
2011–2014	Basel U21	53	(3)
2013–2016	Basel	29	(1)
2015	→ Vaduz (loan)	24	(0)
2016–2017	1. FC Kaiserslautern	20	(0)
2018	Virtus Entella	17	(0)
2018–2019	Dinamo București	16	(0)
2019–2021	Budapest Honvéd	33	(1)
2022–2024	Voluntari	61	(1)
2024–	Dinamo City	64	(0)

International career^{‡}
2007–2008	Switzerland U15	1	(0)
2008	Switzerland U16	2	(1)
2011	Switzerland U18	3	(0)
2013–2014	Switzerland U20	6	(1)
2014	Switzerland U21	2	(0)
2015–	Albania	19	(0)
- * Club domestic league appearances and goals as of 2 November 2026 ‡ National team caps and goals as of 16 November 2025

Naser Ismail Aliji (born 27 December 1993) is a professional footballer who plays as a left-back or centre-back for Dinamo City and for the Albania national team. Born in Macedonia, he played for Switzerland at youth international levels, and made his senior debut for Albania in 2015.

== Club career ==
=== Early career ===
Aliji was born in Kumanovo and is of Albanian ethnicity. He lived there until the age of four, when his mother moved with his sister and brother to Baden, Switzerland, to join their father, who had been working there for several years. He began playing football at the age of four, after his older brother took him to Baden. He was also part of Team Limmattal, a regional youth development group established in 2004 by Baden, Wettingen and Würenlos. At the age of nine, he joined Aarau, where he spent one year before moving to Basel in 2008. He progressed through Basel's under-18 and under-21 teams, receiving the club's "Rookie of the Year" award in 2011 and 2013.

=== Basel ===
Aliji signed his first professional contract with Basel on 20 June 2013 and joined the club's first team. He made his first-team debut on 17 August, coming on as a substitute in a 2013–14 Swiss Cup first-round match against BSC Old Boys. He made his first start in the Swiss Cup quarter-final against Le Mont on 5 February 2014, providing the assist for Marco Streller in a 6–1 victory. On 16 March, he made his Swiss Super League debut, playing the full match in a 5–0 home win over FC Aarau. At the end of the season, he won the 2013–14 Swiss Super League title with Basel, who also reached the Swiss Cup final, losing 2–0 to FC Zürich after extra time. During the 2013–14 Champions League season, Basel reached the group stage and finished third in their group. They consequently qualified for the Europa League knockout phase, where they advanced to the quarter-finals.

Aliji scored his first goal for Basel on 19 July 2014 in a 2–1 away win over Aarau in the opening match of the 2014–15 Swiss Super League. Basel also entered the UEFA Champions League group stage and qualified for the knockout phase after securing a 1–1 draw away to Liverpool at Anfield on 9 December 2014. During the first half of the season, Aliji made nine competitive appearances, including five in the league, three in the Swiss Cup and one in the UEFA Champions League, as well as eight appearances in friendly matches. With limited opportunities under manager Paulo Sousa, Basel arranged a loan move to FC Vaduz on 17 January 2015 to give him regular first-team football.

Basel won the league title for a sixth consecutive season in 2014–15, while Aliji was on loan at Vaduz for the second half of the campaign.

==== Loan to Vaduz ====
Aliji joined fellow Swiss Super League side FC Vaduz on loan in January 2015, initially for 18 months. He made his debut on 15 February 2015, playing the full match in a 1–0 away win over Aarau. He made 17 league appearances during the remainder of the 2014–15 season, all as a starter, and was substituted only once. Aliji also helped Vaduz win the 2014–15 Liechtenstein Cup, appearing in the final against Triesenberg on 13 May 2015, when Vaduz won 5–0.

Vaduz qualified for the 2015–16 UEFA Europa League first qualifying round after winning the Liechtenstein Cup. Aliji played the full match in a 5–0 away win over La Fiorita in the first leg on 2 July 2015. Vaduz advanced with a 10–1 aggregate victory before defeating Nõmme Kalju in the second qualifying round. Aliji played the full first leg, a 3–1 win, and scored in the 2–0 away victory in the return leg on 23 July. Vaduz were eliminated by Thun in the third qualifying round after two draws, losing on the away-goals rule. Aliji played the full 90 minutes in both matches, which ended 0–0 and 2–2.

==== Return to Basel ====
Following an injury to Adama Traoré while on international duty with the Ivory Coast, Basel recalled Aliji from his loan spell at Vaduz in September 2015. Before his recall, Aliji had made a further seven league appearances for Vaduz in the 2015–16 season. Under manager Urs Fischer, Aliji won the 2015–16 Swiss Super League title, his third league championship with Basel. The club secured its 19th title and seventh in succession on 30 April 2016.

Basel announced on 1 July 2016 that Aliji would leave the club to join 1. FC Kaiserslautern. During his time with Basel's first team, he made 42 competitive appearances and scored once; the club's statistical archive records 64 appearances in total, including friendly matches.

=== 1. FC Kaiserslautern ===
On 1 July 2016, Aliji joined 2. Bundesliga club 1. FC Kaiserslautern from Basel, signing a contract until June 2019.

He was signed to fill the vacancy left by Chris Löwe at left-back. Initially a regular under manager Tayfun Korkut, Aliji struggled to retain his place after Korkut's departure and was dropped by his successor, Norbert Meier. He made his 2. Bundesliga debut on 5 August 2016, starting in a 4–0 home defeat to Hannover 96. He also played the full 120 minutes in a 4–3 extra-time defeat to Hallescher FC in the first round of the 2016–17 DFB-Pokal. During the 2016–17 season, he made 20 league appearances and provided two assists.

After initially failing to find another club, his contract was terminated by mutual agreement on 31 August 2017, two years before its scheduled expiry. According to Der Betze brennt, the agreement included a severance payment.

=== Virtus Entella ===
After five months without a club, Aliji joined Serie B side Virtus Entella on 25 January 2018. He made 17 league appearances, including two in the relegation play-offs, and provided one assist during the 2017–18 season. Entella finished 19th and faced Ascoli in the relegation play-offs. After both legs ended 0–0, Entella were relegated to Serie C because Ascoli had finished higher in the regular-season standings.

=== Dinamo București ===
On 2 November 2018, Aliji joined Liga I club Dinamo București as a free agent, becoming the first signing under manager Mircea Rednic. He was assigned the number 7 shirt ahead of the Bucharest derby against FCSB, although he did not make his debut in the match.

Shortly after joining, Aliji sustained a knee injury during training in November 2018 and travelled to Switzerland for treatment and rehabilitation. He returned to training in January 2019 and made his competitive debut on 4 February, starting in a 3–0 league win over Politehnica Iași. He became a regular starter under Rednic and was described by the Romanian press as one of the team's important players in early 2019. Aliji made 16 league appearances and provided one assist during the 2018–19 season.

In June 2019, Aliji expressed his intention to leave Dinamo, saying that he wanted to continue his career in Switzerland to be closer to his family. He left the club later that summer and joined Budapest Honvéd on 29 August 2019.

=== Budapest Honvéd ===
On 29 August 2019, Aliji joined Nemzeti Bajnokság I club Budapest Honvéd on a two-year contract, with an option for an additional season. He made his debut on 14 September, coming on as a substitute in a 1–0 league defeat to Fehérvár. He made his first start later that month, in a 2–1 away win over Mezőkövesdi SE. During the 2019–20 season, Aliji helped Honvéd win the 2019–20 Magyar Kupa, appearing as a substitute in the final against Mezőkövesd, which Honvéd won 2–1 on 3 June 2020.

He made 30 league appearances during his two seasons at the club before departing in July 2021, following the expiry of his contract.

=== Voluntari ===
After a year without a club, Aliji joined Liga I side Voluntari as a free agent on 4 July 2022. He made 37 league appearances and scored once during the 2022–23 season. He made a further 24 league appearances in 2023–24, finishing his spell at the club with 61 league appearances and one goal. He left Voluntari in 2024 and joined Dinamo City in September.

=== Dinamo City ===
On 3 September 2024, Aliji returned to Albania, joining Kategoria Superiore club Dinamo City as a free agent. The club described him as a defender with experience at several European clubs. During the 2024–25 season, he made 33 league appearances as Dinamo finished fourth in the Kategoria Superiore. He started the 2025 Albanian Cup final against Egnatia and scored in the penalty shoot-out as Dinamo won 5–4 following a 2–2 draw after extra-time to claim the trophy. His performances earned him a recall to the Albania national team in March 2025, and he was also deployed as a centre-back by Dinamo.

During the 2025–26 season, Aliji missed approximately three months after undergoing surgery in Germany for pubalgia in December 2025. He returned to action on 14 February 2026, making a substitute appearance in the Albanian Cup match against Tirana. During the 2025–26 season, Aliji made 22 league appearances as Dinamo finished fourth in the Kategoria Superiore. Dinamo also retained the Albanian Cup, defeating Egnatia 3–2 in the final on 13 May 2026 to win the competition for a second consecutive season.

In the 2026–27 season, Aliji helped Dinamo reach the UEFA Conference League play-off round round after progressing through three qualifying rounds. He started both legs against Pafos, but Dinamo were eliminated after a 5–3 aggregate defeat.

== International career ==
Although he had represented Switzerland at youth level, Aliji did not rule out the possibility of playing for Albania. On 17 December 2014, Sokol Dauti, the FSHF representative for scouting talents in Switzerland, confirmed that Aliji had decided to represent Albania and begun the process of obtaining an Albanian passport, while three of his former teammates at Basel, Taulant Xhaka, Shkëlzen Gashi and Arlind Ajeti, had also represented Switzerland at youth level before choosing Albania. On 5 March 2015, Aliji received Albanian citizenship alongside Ajeti.

Aliji received his first call-up from manager Gianni De Biasi for the UEFA Euro 2016 qualifying match against Armenia on 29 March 2015. However, he was unavailable for the match because he had not yet received FIFA clearance to switch associations after representing Switzerland at youth level. He was subsequently called up for the friendly against France on 13 June 2015, making his international debut and playing the full match in Albania's 1–0 victory. He made his competitive debut on 11 October, starting in a 3–0 away win over Armenia in the UEFA Euro 2016 qualifying campaign.

On 21 May 2016, Aliji was named in Albania's preliminary 27-man squad for UEFA Euro 2016, and was included in the final 23-man squad on 31 May. He remained an unused substitute in all three of Albania's group matches, against Switzerland, France and Romania. Albania finished third in Group A with three points, but were eliminated after ranking sixth among the six third-placed teams, with only the four best advancing to the round of 16.

Following Euro 2016, Aliji continued to feature for Albania, making three appearances in the 2018 FIFA World Cup qualification campaign. He later played in a 3–0 away win over Andorra in the UEFA Euro 2020 qualifying campaign on 25 March 2019.

In June 2023, Aliji was recalled to the national team by manager Sylvinho as a replacement for the injured Iván Balliu ahead of Albania's UEFA Euro 2024 qualifying matches against Moldova and the Faroe Islands. He remained an unused substitute in both matches. After more than five years without an international appearance, Aliji returned to the pitch on 7 June 2024, playing 45 minutes in a 3–1 friendly win over Azerbaijan. He was subsequently included in Albania's squad for UEFA Euro 2024, where he remained an unused substitute in all three group matches.

In March 2025, Aliji was recalled for the 2026 FIFA World Cup qualification campaign and started in Albania's 2–0 defeat to England at Wembley Stadium on 21 March.

== Personal life ==
Following Albania's historic participation at UEFA Euro 2016, Aliji was among the national team players awarded diplomatic passports by the Albanian government in recognition of their achievement.

In the summer of 2018, after being unable to find a club, Aliji returned to Switzerland and trained with his former youth club, FC Baden, to maintain his fitness. He later revealed that his father had been suffering from cancer and that he had chosen to spend time with him during the final months of his life. His father died in September 2018.

== Career statistics ==
=== Club ===
As of match played 2 November 2026

Appearances and goals by club, season and competition
Club	Season	League			Cup		Europe (Note: Including continental competitions, such as UEFA Champions League and UEFA Europa League)		Other		Total	
Club	Season	Division	Apps	Goals	Apps	Goals	Apps	Goals	Apps	Goals	Apps	Goals
Basel U21	2011–12	1. Liga Promotion	22	1	—		—		—		22	1
Basel U21	2012–13	1. Liga Promotion	20	1	—		—		—		20	1
Basel U21	2013–14	1. Liga Promotion	10	0	—		—		—		10	0
Basel U21	2014–15	1. Liga Promotion	1	1	—		—		—		1	1
Basel U21	Total		53	3	0	0	0	0	0	0	53	3
Basel	2013–14	Swiss Super League	9	0	4	0	3 (Note: All appearance(s) in UEFA Europa League)	0	—		16	0
Basel	2014–15	Swiss Super League	5	1	3	0	1 (Note: Appearance in UEFA Champions League)	0	—		9	1
Basel	2015–16	Swiss Super League	15	0	2	0	—		—		17	0
Basel	Total		29	1	9	0	4	0	0	0	42	1
Vaduz (loan)	2014–15	Swiss Super League	17	0	2	0	—		—		19	0
Vaduz (loan)	2015–16	Swiss Super League	7	0	0	0	5	1	—		12	1
Vaduz (loan)	Total		24	0	2	0	5	1	0	0	31	1
1. FC Kaiserslautern	2016–17	2. Bundesliga	20	0	1	0	—		—		21	0
Virtus Entella	2017–18	Serie B	17	0	—		—		—		17	0
Dinamo București	2018–19	Liga I	16	0	—		—		—		16	0
Budapest Honvéd	2019–20	Nemzeti Bajnokság I	21	1	4	0	—		—		25	1
Budapest Honvéd	2020–21	Nemzeti Bajnokság I	12	0	3	1	2	0	—		17	1
Budapest Honvéd	Total		107	1	8	1	2	0	0	0	96	2
Voluntari	2022–23	Liga I	36	1	2	0	—		1 (Note: Appearance in Liga I European play-offs)	1	39	2
Voluntari	2023–24	Liga I	24	0	1	0	—		—		25	0
Voluntari	Total		60	1	3	0	0	0	1	1	64	1
Dinamo City	2024–25	Kategoria Superiore	33	0	5	0	—		—		38	0
Dinamo City	2025–26	Kategoria Superiore	22	0	5	0	6	0	—		33	0
Dinamo City	2026–27	Kategoria Superiore	9	0	0	0	8	0	—		17	0
Dinamo City	Total		64	0	10	0	14	0	0	0	88	0
Career total			337	6	37	1	25	1	1	1	376	8

=== International ===
As of 16 November 2025

Appearances and goals by national team and year
National team	Year	Apps	Goals
Albania	2015	3	0
Albania	2016	4	0
Albania	2017	4	0
Albania	2018	1	0
Albania	2019	1	0
Albania	2020	0	0
Albania	2021	0	0
Albania	2022	0	0
Albania	2023	0	0
Albania	2024	1	0
Albania	2025	5	0
Total		19	0

== Honours ==
Basel

- Swiss Super League: 2013–14, 2014–15, 2015–16
- Swiss Cup runner-up: 2013–14

Vaduz

- Liechtenstein Cup: 2014–15

Budapest Honvéd

- Magyar Kupa: 2019–20

Dinamo City

- Albanian Cup: 2024–25, 2025–26

Individual

- FC Basel Rookies of the Year: 2011, 2013
