= Gastón Sauro =

Argentine footballer

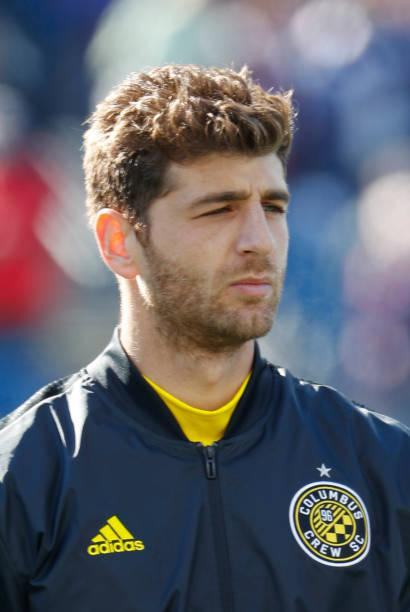
- Sauro with Columbus Crew SC

Personal information
- Date of birth: 23 February 1990 (age 36)
- Place of birth: Rosario, Argentina
- Height: 1.91 m (6 ft 3 in)
- Position: Centre-back

Youth career
- Boca Juniors

Senior career*
Years	Team	Apps	(Gls)
2008–2012	Boca Juniors	15	(1)
2012–2015	Basel	35	(1)
2014–2015	→ Catania (loan)	27	(1)
2015–2019	Columbus Crew	39	(2)
2019–2021	Toluca	23	(1)
2021–2022	Sarmiento	35	(0)
2023	Huracán	11	(0)
2023–2024	América de Cali	7	(0)
2024	Sarmiento	8	(0)

International career
2007	Argentina U17	2	(2)
- * Club domestic league appearances and goals as of 17:03, 14 January 2025 (UTC)

Gastón Sauro (born 23 February 1990) is an Argentine professional footballer who plays as a centre-back.

== Club career ==
=== Boca Juniors ===
Sauro made his professional debut with Boca Juniors during the 2008–09 season.

=== FC Basel ===
On 6 July 2012, it was announced that Sauro had signed a four-year contract with Swiss club FC Basel. Sauro made his debut on 17 July in a 2–0 away win against Flora Tallinn in the 1st Leg of the second qualifying round to the 2012–13 UEFA Champions League. He made his Swiss Super League debut on 28 July in a 2–2 draw away against the Grasshopper Club. He scored his first goal for the club in the home game at the St. Jakob-Park on 26 September, as Basel won 4–1 against FC Sion.

At the end of the 2012–13 Swiss Super League, Sauro won the Championship title with Basel. In the 2012–13 Swiss Cup Basel reached the final, but were runners up behind Grasshopper Club, being defeated 4–3 on penalties, following a 1–1 draw after extra time.

At the start of the 2013–14 season, Sauro was a member of the Basel team that won the 2013 Uhrencup.

At the end of the 2013–14 Swiss Super League, Sauro won his second league championship with Basel. The team also reached the final of the Swiss Cup on 21 April 2014l Sauro and Giovanni Sio were both sent off as Basel lost to rivals FC Zürich 2–0 in extra time, after a goalless 90 minutes.

During his time with Basel, Sauro played a total of 91 games, scoring three goals.

==== Loan to Catania ====
On 19 August 2014, Sauro joined Serie B club Catania on an initial one-year loan deal with an option to buy. He was given the number 15 shirt. He made his Serie B debut on 30 August, coming on as a late substitute for Gino Peruzzi in Catania's 3−3 draw with Virtus Lanciano. In just his second game for the Italian side, Sauro picked up two yellow cards and was sent off in the 70th minute as Catania fell to a 3−2 defeat to Pro Vercelli on 7 September 2014.

=== Columbus Crew SC ===
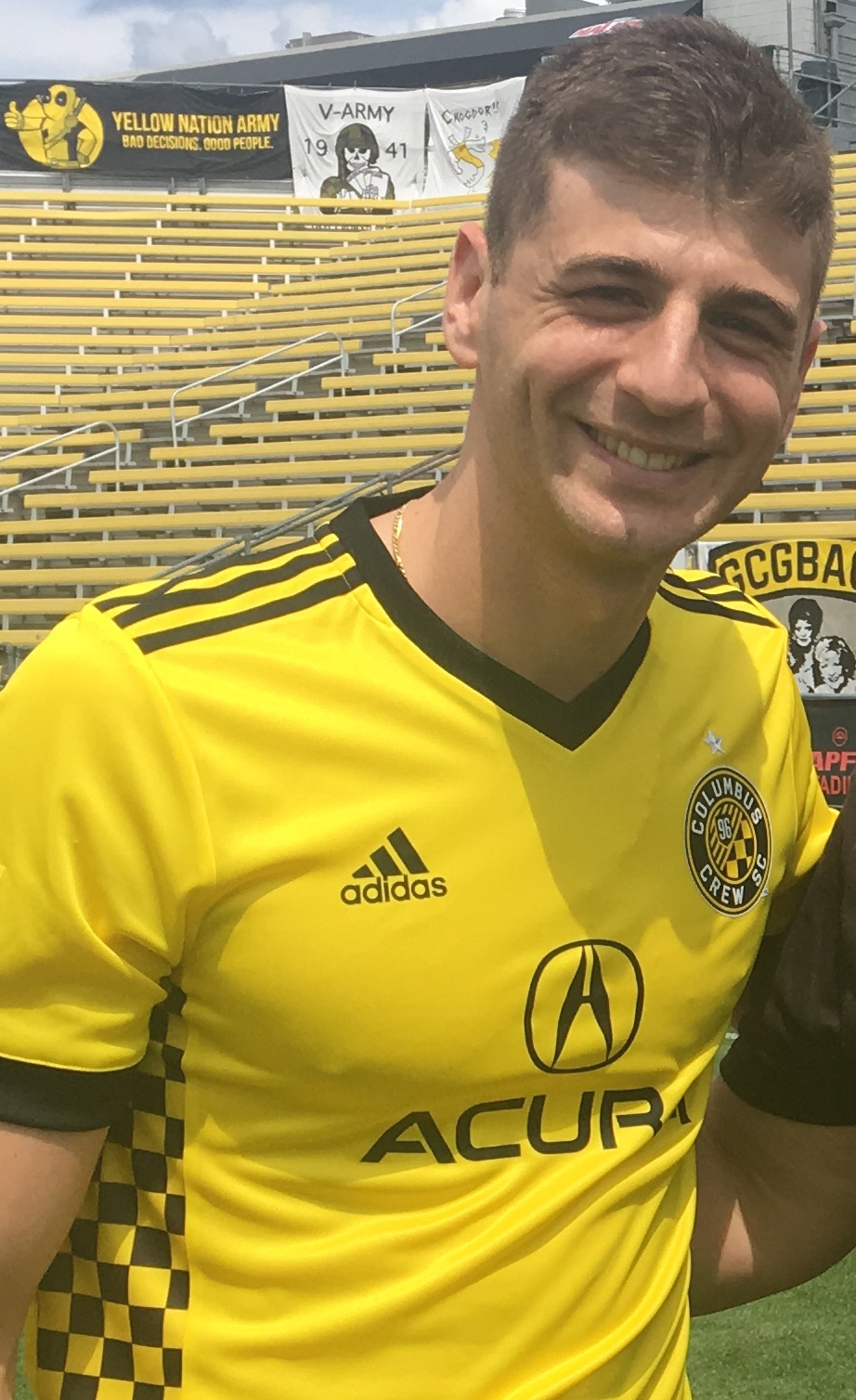
Sauro with Columbus Crew SC in 2017

On 6 August 2015, Sauro signed for Columbus Crew SC of Major League Soccer.

He made his MLS debut on 6 September 2015 in a 3–0 loss to FC Dallas, being substituted after seven minutes with a head injury.

During the 2016 season, he tore his PCL in a 0–0 draw with Toronto FC on 21 May 2016, being ruled out for 4-5 months. Sauro chose to undertake rehab rather than surgery, a choice he later called "the wrong decision." After returning to the team, the pain in his knee returned and doctors found a new injury which was worsened by his PCL tear. On 19 December 2016, Columbus announced that Sauro would miss the entire 2017 season to recover from multiple knee surgeries.

Sauro signed a new contract with Columbus on 11 January 2018.

=== Deportivo Toluca ===
On 7 August 2019, Sauro transferred to Liga MX side Toluca. He left the club in May 2021.

=== Club Atlético Sarmiento ===
On 29 August 2021, Sauro was acquired by Club Atlético Sarmiento of the Argentine Primera División.

== International career ==
Sauro was a member of the Argentina squad at the 2007 FIFA U-17 World Cup. He made his debut in the match against Costa Rica, where he scored both goals in his team's 2–0 victory.

== Style of play ==
A strong, physically imposing player, former teammate Wil Trapp called Sauro a player that "exudes confidence; he’s a natural leader [...], a guy who you can really rely on to crunch a guy when a guy needs to be crunched. He’s a physical beast, but he’s a smart player as well.”

== Personal life ==
Sauro earned his U.S. green card prior to the 2017 MLS season. This status also qualifies him as a domestic player for MLS roster purposes.

== Honours ==
Boca Juniors

- Primera División: 2011 Apertura
- Copa Argentina: 2011–12
- Copa Libertadores runner-up: 2012

Basel

- Swiss Super League: 2012–13, 2013–14
- Swiss Cup runner-up: 2012–13, 2013–14
- Uhrencup: 2013

Columbus Crew SC

- Eastern Conference (Playoffs): 2015
