= Daniele Russo =

Swiss footballer (born 1985)

Personal information
- Full name: Daniele Russo
- Date of birth: 3 November 1985 (age 40)
- Place of birth: Switzerland
- Height: 1.93 m (6 ft 4 in)
- Position: Defender

Team information
- Current team: AC Bellinzona
- Number: 15

Youth career
- –2004: Team Ticino U18

Senior career*
Years	Team	Apps	(Gls)
2004–2007	FC Lugano	20	(1)
2008	FC Mendrisio-Stabio	9	(0)
2008–2012	FC Chiasso	104	(4)
2012–2013	AC Bellinzona	10	(0)
2013	→ FC Lugano (loan)	16	(0)
2013–2016	FC St. Gallen	0	(0)
2016–2017	FC Winterthur	18	(0)
2017–	AC Bellinzona	1	(0)
- * Club domestic league appearances and goals as of 16 August 2017

Daniele Russo (born 3 November 1985) is a Swiss defender, who currently plays for AC Bellinzona.
