= Patrick Peters =

German footballer (born 1987)

Personal information
- Date of birth: 7 November 1987 (age 38)
- Place of birth: Malchin, East Germany
- Height: 1.85 m (6 ft 1 in)
- Position: Centre-back

Team information
- Current team: FC Singen 04
- Number: 2

Youth career
- 2001–2004: FC Tollense Neubrandenburg
- 2004–2006: Carl Zeiss Jena

Senior career*
Years	Team	Apps	(Gls)
2006–2007	FC Bazenheid		
2007	FC Gossau		
2007	FC Herisau		
2008	FC Tuggen		
2009–2010	VfB Lübeck	34	(2)
2011–2014	FC Tuggen		
2015	SC Brühl		
2015	FC United Zürich		
2015–2016	USV Eschen/Mauren		
2017	FC Tuggen		
2017–2018	USV Eschen/Mauren		
2018–2019	FC Bazenheid		
2019	FC Radolfzell		
2019–2022	FC 08 Villingen	35	(0)
2022–2023	1. FC Rielasingen-Arlen	27	(1)
2023–	FC Singen 04		
- * Club domestic league appearances and goals

Patrick Peters (born 7 November 1987) is a German footballer who plays as a centre-back for FC Singen 04.

== Career ==
=== Early career ===
Peters was born in Malchin, Mecklenburg-Vorpommern. He left his parents at age thirteen to attend boarding and sports schools. He began his career in 2001 with his hometown team, FC Tollense Neubrandenburg, transferring in 2004 to Carl Zeiss Jena and playing in the B-Junioren Bundesliga.

=== Professional career ===
After two years with Carl Zeiss Jena, Peters was scouted by the Swiss club FC Bazenheid in 2006. Peters next signed with FC Gossau July 2007 and was subsequently released only three months later to join FC Herisau. After half a year with FC Herisau, Peters signed a contract with FC Tuggen on 30 June 2009. On 15 April 2009, Peters signed a two-year contract with VfB Lübeck and joined his current club on 1 July 2009. On 18 December 2010, he returned to FC Tuggen.
