= 2013–14 Swiss Cup =

Tournament details
- Country: Switzerland
- Teams: 64

Final positions
- Champions: FC Zürich
- Runners-up: FC Basel

Tournament statistics
- Matches played: 63
- Goals scored: 255 (4.05 per match)
- Top goal scorer(s): Dimitar Rangelov, Ange Mawete N’Silu (6)

The 2013–14 Swiss Cup was the 89th season of Switzerland's annual football cup competition. The competition started on 14 August 2013 with the first game of Round 1 and ended in May 2014 with the Final. The winners of the competition qualified for the play-off round of the 2014–15 UEFA Europa League. The title holders were Grasshopper Zürich.

== Participating clubs ==
All 19 teams from Super League and Challenge League (teams from Liechtenstein only play in the 2013–14 Liechtenstein Cup) automatically entered this year's competition, as well as 45 teams from lower leagues. Teams from 1. Liga Promotion and below had to qualify through separate qualifying rounds within their leagues. Teams from regional leagues had to qualify by winning the last season's regional cups.

2013–14 Super League; 10 teams	2013–14 Challenge League; 9 teams	2013–14 1. Liga Promotion; 10 teams	2013–14 1. Liga; 11 teams	2013-14 2. Liga Interregional; 10 teams	2013-14 Regional leagues 14 teams
FC Aarau (AG); FC Basel (BS); Grasshopper Zürich ^{TH} (ZH); FC Lausanne-Sport (VD); FC Luzern (LU); FC Sion (VS); FC St. Gallen (SG); FC Thun (BE); BSC Young Boys (BE); FC Zürich (ZH)	FC Biel-Bienne (BE); FC Chiasso (TI); FC Locarno (TI); FC Lugano (TI); FC Schaffhausen (SH); Servette FC (GE); FC Wil (SG); FC Winterthur (ZH); FC Wohlen (AG)	AC Bellinzona (TI); SC Brühl (SG); Étoile Carouge FC (GE); FC Köniz^{†} (BE); SC Kriens (LU); FC Le Mont^{†} (VD); BSC Old Boys (BS); FC Stade Nyonnais (VD); FC Tuggen (SZ); SC YF Juventus (ZH)	FC Baden (AG); FC Bavois^{†} (VD); FC Bulle (FR); FC Concordia Basel^{†} (BS); FC Échallens (VD); Lancy FC (GE); FC Münsingen (BE); Neuchâtel Xamax FCS (NE); FC Schötz (LU); FC Sursee^{†} (LU); US Terre Sainte (VD)	FC Altstätten (SG); FC Amriswil^{†} (TG); FC Ascona (TI); SC Buochs (NW); FC Dietikon (ZH); FC Hergiswil (NW); FC Kreuzlingen^{‡} (TG); FC La Chaux-de-Fonds^{†} (NE); FC Stade-Lausanne-Ouchy (VD); FC Vevey-Sports 05^{†} (VD)	Sixth tier: SC Balerna (TI); FC Bassersdorf (ZH); AS Calcio Kreuzlingen (TG); FC Chippis^{‡} (VS); FC Cornol (JU); SC Fulenbach (SO); FC Murten (FR); FC Reinach (BL); FC Savièse (VS); FC Schönbühl (BE); FC Suhr (AG); FC Veyrier Sports (GE); Seventh tier: SC Obergeissenstein (LU); FC Wiesendangen^{FP} (ZH)

^{TH} Title holders.
^{FP} Qualified for having the lowest fair play points inside its regional tier.
^{†} Qualified in their last season's tier qualifiers before being promoted.
^{‡} Qualified in their last season's tier qualifiers before being relegated.

== Round 1 ==
Teams from Super League and Challenge League were seeded in this round. In a match, the home advantage was granted to the team from the lower league, if applicable.

Team 1	Score	Team 2
14 August 2013
FC Fulenbach	0–6	FC Baden
17 August 2013
FC Sursee	1–3 (a.e.t.)	FC Sion
FC Kreuzlingen	2–4	FC Stade-Lausanne-Ouchy
FC Bassersdorf	0–6	FC Zürich
FC Veyrier Sports	0–8	BSC Young Boys
FC Amriswil	2–3	FC Tuggen
FC Münsingen	2–0	FC Bulle
FC Altstätten	0–5	FC Wohlen
FC Reinach	1–4	Lancy FC
FC Wiesendangen	1–2	FC Savièse
SC Kriens	0–1	Grasshopper Zürich
SC Brühl	0–0 (a.e.t.) (p. 5–4)	FC Winterthur
FC Stade Nyonnais	2–0 (a.e.t.)	AC Bellinzona
BSC Old Boys	0–1 (a.e.t.)	FC Basel
FC Le Mont	4–1	FC Wil
US Terre Sainte	2–1	FC Chiasso
FC Dietikon	0–6	SC YF Juventus
SC Balerna	1–3	FC Hergiswil
FC Vevey-Sports 05	1–3	FC Köniz
Étoile Carouge FC	1–4	FC Lugano
FC La Chaux-de-Fonds	0–3	Servette FC
18 August 2013
FC Concordia Basel	2–4	FC Biel-Bienne
FC Chippis	0–6	FC Schaffhausen
SC Obergeissenstein	1–3	FC Bavois
FC Échallens	1–3	FC Thun
FC Cornol	0–7	FC Lausanne-Sport
FC Murten	0–11	FC Luzern
FC Suhr	1–3	SC Buochs
Neuchâtel Xamax FCS	1–3	FC Aarau
FC Schönbühl	1–8	FC St. Gallen
AS Calcio Kreuzlingen	0–4	FC Schötz
FC Ascona	1–2 (a.e.t.)	FC Locarno

== Round 2 ==
The winners of Round 1 played in this round. Teams from Super League were seeded, the home advantage was granted to the team from the lower league, if applicable. FC Savièse, from the sixth tier of Swiss football, were the lowest-ranked team in this round.

Team 1	Score	Team 2
13 September 2013
FC Locarno	0–3	FC Thun
14 September 2013
FC Hergiswil	2–3	FC Baden
FC Schötz	3–4	FC Köniz
FC Stade Nyonnais	2–4 (a.e.t.)	Grasshopper Zürich
SC Brühl	3–2	FC Schaffhausen
FC Bavois	0–4	FC Biel-Bienne
Lancy FC	0–5	FC Le Mont
FC Münsingen	0–1	FC Basel
SC YF Juventus	2–4	BSC Young Boys
FC Savièse	1–3	FC Tuggen
SC Buochs	1–5	FC Aarau
Servette FC	0–1	FC Lausanne-Sport
15 September 2013
FC Wohlen	0–1	FC Sion
US Terre Sainte	1–4	FC Luzern
FC Lugano	1–3	FC St. Gallen
FC Stade-Lausanne-Ouchy	2–3	FC Zürich

== Round 3 ==
The winners of Round 2 played in this round. Teams from Super League were seeded, the home advantage was granted to the team from the lower league, if applicable. FC Baden, from the fourth tier of Swiss football, were the lowest-ranked team in this round.

Team 1	Score	Team 2
9 November 2013
FC Baden	1–4	FC Zürich
FC Köniz	1–4	Grasshopper Zürich
SC Brühl	0–3	FC Lausanne-Sport
FC Le Mont	4–1	BSC Young Boys
10 November 2013
FC Tuggen	1–3	FC Basel
FC Luzern	1–0	FC Sion
FC St. Gallen	4–0	FC Aarau
14 November
FC Biel-Bienne	0–1 (a.e.t.)	FC Thun

== Quarter-finals ==
The winners of Round 3 played in the Quarter-finals, there was no home advantage granted in the draw. FC Le Mont, from the third tier of Swiss football, were the lowest-ranked team in this round.

4 December 2013
19:00

FC Thun	0–0 (a.e.t.)	Grasshopper Zürich
Penalties
M. Schneuwly (penalty scored); Lüthi (penalty scored); Wittwer (penalty missed); Martínez (penalty scored); Sadik (penalty scored)	4–3	(penalty scored) Toko; (penalty missed) Gashi; (penalty scored) Feltscher; (penalty scored) Dingsdag; (penalty missed) Vilotić

Arena Thun, Thun
Attendance: 2,764
Referee: Sebastien Pache

4 December 2013
19:45

FC Luzern	2–0	FC Lausanne-Sport
Rangelov 61'; Lezcano 71'

Swissporarena, Lucerne
Attendance: 6,110
Referee: Sascha Amhof

4 December 2013
20:15

FC St. Gallen	0–1	FC Zürich
		Rikan 82' (pen.)

AFG Arena, St. Gallen
Attendance: 7,753
Referee: Adrien Jaccottet

5 February 2014
19:30

FC Le Mont	1–6	FC Basel
Bouziane 89'	Report	Andrist 6', 84'; Suchý 8'; Streller 45'; Frei 48'; D. Degen 58'

St. Jakob-Park, Basel
Attendance: 6,138
Referee: Patrick Graf

== Semi-finals ==
26 March 2014
19:00

FC Basel	1–0	FC Luzern
Callà 80'	Report (German)

St. Jakob-Park, Basel
Attendance: 12,688
Referee: Alain Bieri

26 March 2014
21:00

FC Zürich	0–0 (a.e.t.)	FC Thun
	Report (German)
Penalties
Buff (penalty scored); Chikhaoui (penalty scored); Sadiku (penalty scored); Teixeira (penalty scored); Pedro (penalty scored)	5–4	(penalty missed) C. Schneuwly; (penalty scored) Lüthi; (penalty scored) Zuffi; (penalty scored) M. Schneuwly; (penalty scored) Schirinzi

Letzigrund, Zürich
Attendance: 8,575
Referee: Adrien Jaccottet

== Final ==
The two winners of the semi-finals played against each other in the final, which was held on 21 April 2014 in the Stade de Suisse in Bern, with the winner of the first semi-final was to be treated as home team. Zürich beat Thun 5–4 in the penalty shoot-out following a goalless draw in the first semi-final and Basel beat Luzern 1–0 in the second semi-final.

21 April 2014
14:00

Zürich	2–0 (a.e.t.)	Basel
Chikhaoui (yellow card) 61'; Buff (yellow card) 83'; Kecojević (yellow card) 95'; Gavranović 110' (1:0); Gavranović 114' (2:0)	SFV summary	(yellow card) 62' Elneny; (red card) 66' Sauro; (yellow card) 77' (yellow-red card) 99' Sio; (yellow card) 102' Serey Die

Stade de Suisse, Bern
Attendance: 23,312
Referee: (Switzerland) Patrick Graf

GK	(Switzerland) David Da Costa
DF	(Portugal) Jorge Teixeira
DF	(Montenegro) Ivan Kecojević	(yellow card) 95'
DF	(Switzerland) Berat Djimsiti
MF	(Switzerland) Oliver Buff	(yellow card) 83'	(substituted off) 86'
MF	(Switzerland) Philippe Koch (cap)
MF	(Switzerland) Davide Chiumiento
MF	(Tunisia) Yassine Chikhaoui	(yellow card) 61'
MF	(Israel) Avi Rikan		(substituted off) 111'
ST	(Switzerland) Mario Gavranović
ST	(Cameroon) Franck Etoundi		(substituted off) 91'
Substitutes:
DF	(Switzerland) Davide Mariani		(substituted on) 86'
MF	(Albania) Armando Sadiku		(substituted on) 91'
FW	(Montenegro) Asmir Kajević		(substituted on) 111'
Manager:
(Switzerland) Urs Meier

GK	(Switzerland) Yann Sommer
DF	(Switzerland) Naser Aliji
DF	(Czech Republic) Marek Suchý
DF	(Argentina) Gastón Sauro	(red card) 66'
DF	(Sweden) Behrang Safari
MF	(Ivory Coast) Serey Die	(yellow card) 102'
MF	(Egypt) Mohamed Elneny	(yellow card) 62'
MF	(Switzerland) Davide Callà		(substituted off) 70'
MF	(Switzerland) Fabian Frei		(substituted off) 60'
MF	(Switzerland) Valentin Stocker (cap)		(substituted off) 106'
ST	(Ivory Coast) Giovanni Sio	(yellow card) 77' (yellow-red card) 99'
Substitutes:
MF	(Argentina) Matías Delgado		(substituted on) 60'
MF	(Switzerland) Arlind Ajeti		(substituted on) 70'
MF	(Chile) Marcelo Díaz		(substituted on) 106'
Manager:
(Switzerland) Murat Yakin
