= 2013–14 Swiss Super League =

117th season of top-tier Swiss football

Swiss Super League
- Season: 2013–14
- Dates: 13 July 2013 – 18 May 2014
- Champions: Basel; 17th title
- Relegated: Lausanne
- Champions League: Basel; Grasshoppers
- Europa League: Zürich; Young Boys; Luzern
- Matches: 180
- Goals: 520 (2.89 per match)
- Top goalscorer: Shkelzen Gashi (19 goals)
- Biggest home win: Basel 5–0 Aarau (16 March 2014); Grasshoppers 5–0 Young Boys (4 May 2014)
- Biggest away win: Grasshoppers 0–5 Thun (16 April 2014)
- Highest scoring: Young Boys 5–3 Lausanne (16 February 2014)
- Highest attendance: 34,172; Basel 1–1 Grasshoppers (27 April 2014)
- Lowest attendance: 1,050(8 May 2014)
- Average attendance: 10,772

The 2013–14 Swiss Super League was the 117th season of top-tier football in Switzerland. It began on 13 July 2013 and ended on 18 May 2014. Basel successfully defended their title for a record fifth time in a row.

A total of 10 teams competed in the league. The 9 best teams from the 2012–13 season and the 2012–13 Swiss Challenge League champion FC Aarau.

== Teams ==
=== Stadia and locations ===
Location of the 2013–14 Swiss Super League teams

Club	Location	Stadium	Capacity
Aarau	Aarau	Stadion Brügglifeld	9,249
Basel	Basel	St. Jakob-Park	38,512
Grasshopper	Zürich	Letzigrund	23,605
Lausanne-Sport	Lausanne	Stade Olympique de la Pontaise	15,850
Luzern	Lucerne	Swissporarena	17,500
Sion	Sion	Stade Tourbillon	16,500
St. Gallen	St. Gallen	AFG Arena	19,694
Thun	Thun	Arena Thun	10,000
Young Boys	Bern	Stade de Suisse	31,783
Zürich	Zürich	Letzigrund	23,605

=== Personnel and kits ===
Team	Manager	Captain	Kit manufacturer	Shirt sponsor
Aarau	(Switzerland) René Weiler	(Switzerland) Sandro Burki	Nike	Zehnder Group AG
Basel	(Switzerland) Murat Yakin	(Switzerland) Marco Streller	adidas	Novartis
Grasshopper	(Germany) Michael Skibbe	(Switzerland) Vero Salatić	Puma	FROMM/adt innova
Lausanne-Sport	(France) Henri Atamaniuk	(Spain) Gabri	adidas	Banque cantonale vaudoise
Luzern	(Switzerland) Carlos Bernegger	(Switzerland) Florian Stahel	adidas	Otto's
Sion	(France) Laurent Roussey	(Hungary) Vilmos Vanczák	Erreà	Les Fils Maye SA
St. Gallen	(Luxembourg) Jeff Saibene	(Switzerland) Philippe Montandon	Jako	St. Galler Kantonalbank
Thun	(Switzerland) Urs Fischer	(Switzerland) Roland Bättig	Erima	Panorama Center/Sky Work
Young Boys	(Switzerland) Uli Forte	(Switzerland) Christoph Spycher	Jako	Laureus Foundation Switzerland
Zürich	(Switzerland) Urs Meier	(Switzerland) Philippe Koch	Nike	Netstream AG

== League table ==
Pos	Team	Pld	W	D	L	GF	GA	GD	Pts	Qualification or relegation
1	Basel (C)	36	19	15	2	70	34	+36	72	Qualification for the Champions League group stage
2	Grasshopper	36	19	8	9	67	43	+24	65	Qualification for the Champions League third qualifying round
3	Young Boys	36	17	8	11	59	50	+9	59	Qualification for the Europa League third qualifying round
4	Luzern	36	15	6	15	48	54	−6	51	Qualification for the Europa League second qualifying round
5	Zürich	36	14	8	14	51	52	−1	50	Qualification for the Europa League play-off round (Note: Zürich won the 2013–14 Swiss Cup, so therefore qualified for the Play-off round of the 2014–15 UEFA Europa League.)
6	Thun	36	13	9	14	57	53	+4	48	
7	St. Gallen	36	11	12	13	37	47	−10	45	
8	Sion	36	12	7	17	38	45	−7	43	
9	Aarau	36	12	6	18	55	71	−16	42	
10	Lausanne-Sport (R)	36	7	3	26	38	71	−33	24	Relegation to Swiss Challenge League

Source: Swiss Super League (in German)
Rules for classification: 1) points; 2) goal difference; 3) number of goals scored.
(C) Champions; (R) Relegated

== Results ==
=== First and Second Round ===
Home \ Away	AAR	BAS	GCZ	LS	LUZ	SIO	STG	THU	YB	ZÜR
Aarau		1–1	2–4	2–3	4–2	0–1	2–2	2–1	0–4	5–1
Basel	3–1		1–1	2–0	1–1	2–2	3–0	4–1	2–1	1–2
Grasshopper	4–2	1–1		2–0	1–2	0–0	0–1	2–1	0–1	3–1
Lausanne-Sport	1–2	1–2	0–0		0–1	3–1	0–3	0–2	1–3	1–2
Luzern	1–0	1–1	0–2	2–0		1–0	3–1	1–1	1–1	3–2
Sion	1–2	1–3	2–0	2–1	3–0		0–1	0–0	2–2	0–0
St. Gallen	1–0	1–1	0–2	2–0	4–1	2–0		0–0	0–0	2–1
Thun	2–2	0–2	1–1	4–1	1–1	1–0	3–2		1–0	2–1
Young Boys	3–0	2–2	1–2	3–2	0–1	2–0	1–0	3–2		0–1
Zürich	1–2	0–0	1–1	4–0	0–2	4–1	0–0	3–2	1–3	

Source: Swiss Super League
Legend: Blue = home team win; Yellow = draw; Red = away team win.

=== Third and Fourth Round ===
Home \ Away	AAR	BAS	GCZ	LS	LUZ	SIO	STG	THU	YB	ZÜR
Aarau		1–3	4–0	3–1	1–2	2–0	1–1	1–4	2–1	1–2
Basel	5–0		1–1	4–2	3–1	1–0	1–1	0–0	3–2	4–2
Grasshopper	1–2	1–1		2–1	4–1	4–2	2–0	0–5	5–0	2–0
Lausanne-Sport	0–1	1–3	0–2		1–0	0–1	3–0	1–3	0–1	0–1
Luzern	3–2	0–2	1–3	3–4		0–1	1–0	3–0	1–2	1–0
Sion	2–0	0–1	3–1	1–2	3–2		1–1	3–1	3–0	1–0
St. Gallen	4–1	0–3	1–5	0–0	1–1	2–0		1–0	1–1	0–2
Thun	2–0	2–2	1–3	2–2	2–1	3–1	4–0		0–3	1–2
Young Boys	2–2	3–1	0–4	5–3	2–1	0–0	2–0	2–1		1–3
Zürich	2–2	0–0	3–1	0–3	1–2	1–0	2–2	3–1	2–2	

Legend: Blue = home team win; Yellow = draw; Red = away team win.

== Season statistics ==
As of 21 May 2014

=== Top scorers ===
Rank	Player	Club	Goals
1	(Albania) Shkëlzen Gashi	Grasshopper	19
2	(Brazil) Caio Alves	Grasshopper	13
2	(Switzerland) Mario Gavranović	Zürich	13
2	(Switzerland) Valentin Stocker	Basel	13
5	(Bulgaria) Dimitar Rangelov	Luzern	11
6	(Venezuela) Josef Martínez	Thun/Young Boys	10
6	(Switzerland) Marco Schneuwly	Thun	10
6	(Switzerland) Marco Streller	Basel	10
9	(Switzerland) Davide Callà	Basel/Aarau	9
9	(Israel) Munas Dabbur	Grasshopper	9
9	(Switzerland) Michael Frey	Young Boys	9
9	(Switzerland) Goran Karanović	St. Gallen	9
9	(Brazil) Pedro Henrique	Zürich	9
9	(Ivory Coast) Giovanni Sio	Basel	9

== Awards ==
=== Annual awards ===
Swiss Football League Awards 2013
Award	Winner	Club
Player of the Season	(Egypt) Mohammed Salah	Basel
«Mon joueur» Fans' Player of the Year	(Egypt) Mohammed Salah	Basel
Young Player of the Season	(Switzerland) Michael Frey	Young Boys
Coach of the Season	(Switzerland) Murat Yakin	Basel
Goal of the Season	(Switzerland) Sven Lüscher	Arau

Team of the Year
Goalkeeper	(Switzerland) Yann Sommer (Basel)			
Defence	(Switzerland) Michael Lang (GC)	(Serbia) Milan Vilotić (GC)	(Switzerland) Fabian Schär (Basel)	(Switzerland) Kay Voser (Basel)
Midfield	(Egypt) Mohammed Salah (Basel)	(Switzerland) Alexander Frei (Basel)	(Bosnia and Herzegovina) Vero Salatić (GC)	(Switzerland) Valentin Stocker (Basel)
Attack	(Venezuela) Josef Martínez (Thun)		(Switzerland) Marco Streller (Basel)	

== Attendances ==
#	Club	Average
1	Basel	27,841
2	Young Boys	17,553
3	St. Gallen	13,388
4	Luzern	11,291
5	Zürich	9,564
6	GCZ	7,235
7	Sion	6,122
8	Thun	5,605
9	Aarau	5,413
10	Lausanne	3,709
