= 2012–13 FC Zürich season =

FC Zürich
2012–13 season
- Stadium: Letzigrund, Zürich, Switzerland
- Super League: 4th
- Swiss Cup: Semi-final

The 2012–13 FC Zürich season is the 107th season in club history.

== Matches ==
=== Legend ===
Win Draw Loss Postponed

=== Super League ===
==== League results and fixtures ====
15 July 2012 Round 1	FC Luzern	1 - 1	Zürich	Lucerne
13:45	Ziburg (yellow card) 20'; Lezcano (yellow card) 20'; Gygax (yellow card) 44'; Winter 90'	Summary	Gavranović 25' (pen.) (yellow card) 25'; Pedro Henrique (yellow card) 72'; Chermiti (yellow card) 79'	Stadium: Swissporarena; Attendance: 14,127; Referee: (Switzerland) Sascha Arnhorf

22 July 2012 Round 2	Zürich	0 - 2	FC Thun	Zürich
16:00	Pedro Henrique (yellow card) 31'	Summary	Demiri 39' (yellow card) 64'; Lüthi (yellow card) 58'; Ngamukol 90' (yellow card) 90'	Stadium: Letzigrund; Attendance: 9,422; Referee: (Switzerland) Stephan Studer

28 July 2012 Round 3	FC St. Gallen	3 - 1	Zürich	St. Gallen
19:45	Ivić (yellow card) 35'; Scarione 38'; Čavušević 45+1', 81'	Summary	Béda (yellow card) 20'; Gavranović 41'; Chermiti (yellow card) 75'	Stadium: AFG Arena; Attendance: 13,494; Referee: (Switzerland) Stefan Klossner

5 August 2012 Round 4	Zürich	4 - 0	FC Lausanne-Sport	Zürich
13:45	Drmić 14'; Chermiti 38' (pen.) 48'; Schönbächler 82'	Summary	Rodrigo (yellow card) 42'; Sanogo (yellow card) 51'; Facchinetti (yellow card) 53'; Chakhsi (yellow card) 76'	Stadium: Letzigrund; Attendance: 8,471; Referee: (Switzerland) Adrien Jaccottet (Basel)

12 August 2012 Round 5	BSC Young Boys	4 - 1	Zürich	Bern
13:45	Bobadilla 28', 36'; Farnerud 54'; Nuzzolo 69'; González (yellow card) 76'	Summary	Drmić 44' (yellow card) 67'; Gavranović (yellow card) 49'; Kukeli (red card) 76'; Pedro Henrique (red card) 83'	Stadium: Stade de Suisse, Wankdorf; Attendance: 18,160; Referee: (Switzerland) Adrien Jaccottet (Basel)

19 August 2012 Round 6	Servette FC	1 - 1	Zürich	Geneva
13:45	Eudis 15'; Kusunga (yellow card) 41'; Kouassi (yellow card) 47'	Summary	Chiumiento 45+3'; Koch (yellow card) 68'; Glarner (yellow card) 72'; Buff (yellow card) 83'	Stadium: Stade de Genève; Attendance: 5,125; Referee: (Switzerland) Patrick Graf

26 August 2012 Round 7	Zürich	1 - 0	FC Sion	Zürich
13:45	Buff (yellow card) 29'; Chiumiento 35' (pen.); Béda (yellow card) 54'; Glarner (yellow card) 67'	Summary	Vanczák (yellow card) 33'; Aislan (yellow card) 34'; Lafferty (yellow card) 67'	Stadium: Letzigrund; Attendance: 11,016; Referee: (Switzerland) Daniel Wermelinger

2 September 2012 Round 8	Basel	0 - 0	Zürich	Basel
16:00		Summary	Benito (yellow card) 28'	Stadium: St. Jakob-Park; Attendance: 30,423; Referee: (Switzerland) Damien Carrel

22 September 2012 Round 9	Zürich	0 - 1	Grasshopper Club Zürich	Zürich
19:45	Béda (yellow card) 90+1'	Summary	Salatić (yellow card) 51'; Zuber 54'; Pavlović (yellow card) 76'; T. Xhaka (yellow card) 90+4'	Stadium: Letzigrund; Attendance: 17,358; Referee: (Switzerland) Nikolaj Hänni

26 September 2012 Round 10	Zürich	0 - 2	FC St. Gallen	Zürich
19:45	Buff (yellow card) 46'; Koch (yellow card) 51'	Summary	Scarione 14'; Nater (yellow card) 17'; Čavušević 55' (yellow card) 60'	Stadium: Letzigrund; Attendance: 10,666; Referee: (Switzerland) Ludovic Gremaud

30 September 2012 Round 11	FC Sion	2 - 2	Zürich	Sion
16:00	Lafferty 7'; Gattuso (yellow card) 12'; Margairaz 26'; Grettenand (yellow card) 90'	Summary	Gavranović (yellow card) 32' (goal) 46'; Jorge Teixeira 90+1'	Stadium: Stade Tourbillon; Attendance: 9,200; Referee: (Switzerland) Patrick Graf

7 October 2012 Round 12	Zürich	1 - 1	BSC Young Boys	Zürich
13:45	Schönbächler 30' (yellow card) 54'; Pedro Henrique Konzen (yellow card) 53'; Jorge Teixeira (red card) 74'; Da Costa (yellow card) 90+3'	Summary	Zárate (yellow card) 43'; Ojala (yellow card) 56'; Costanzo 74' (pen.)	Stadium: Letzigrund; Attendance: 10,073; Referee: (Switzerland) Adrien Jaccottet (Basel)

21 October 2012 Round 13	Lausanne-Sport	0 - 2	Zürich	Lausanne
13:45		Summary	Buff (yellow card) 55'; Schönbächler 67'; Drmić 83'	Stadium: Stade Olympique de la Pontaise; Attendance: 5,250; Referee: (Switzerland) Daniel Wermelinger

28 October 2012 Round 14	Zürich	1 - 2	FC Basel	Zürich
16:00	Gavranović 87' (pen.)	Summary	Schär 6' (yellow card) 49'; Degen (yellow card) 23'; Frei 29'	Stadium: Letzigrund; Attendance: 12,321; Referee: (Switzerland) Sascha Kever

4 November 2012 Round 15	FC Thun	1 - 4	Zürich	Thun
13:45	Bättig (yellow card) 8'; Renato Steffen (yellow card) 65'; Hediger (yellow card) 70'; Schneuwly 89'	Summary	Jorge Teixeira 15' (yellow card) 84'; Jahović 28' (yellow card) 66'; Kukuruzović 46', 77'	Stadium: Arena Thun; Attendance: 5,932; Referee: (Switzerland) Adrien Jaccottet (Basel)

17 November 2012 Round 16	Zürich	0 - 2	FC Luzern	Zürich
19:45	Drmić (yellow card) 38'; Kajević (yellow card) 43' (yellow-red card); Chiumiento (yellow card) 52'; Buff (yellow card) 65'	Summary	Wiss 26'; Andrist 57'; Muntwiler (yellow card) 83'	Stadium: Letzigrund; Attendance: 10,212; Referee: (Switzerland) Pascal Erlachner

24 November 2012 Round 17	Zürich	0 - 2	Servette	Zürich
19:45	Gajić (yellow card) 56'; Buff (yellow card) 77'; Koch (yellow card) 83'	Summary	Marcos De Azevedo (yellow card) 27'; Routis (yellow card) 53'; Tréand 60'; Eudis 62'; Diallo (yellow card) 90+1'	Stadium: Letzigrund; Attendance: 9,705; Referee: (Switzerland) Fedayi San (Gebenstorf)

2 December 2012 Round 18	Grasshopper	1 - 0	Zürich	Zürich
16:00	Xhaka (yellow card) 18'; Hajrović 21' (pen.); Ben Khalifa (yellow card) 25'; Salatić (yellow card) 38'; Pavlović (yellow card) 55'; João Paiva (yellow card) 90'	Summary	Berat Djimsiti (yellow card) 23'	Stadium: Letzigrund; Attendance: 18,400; Referee: (Switzerland) Patrick Graf

10 February 2013 Round 19	Zürich	2 - 0	Lausanne-Sport	Zürich
13:45	Chermiti 5'; Gajić (yellow card) 57'; Benito (yellow card) 66'; Drmić 90+2'	Summary	Meoli (yellow card) 40'; Tall (yellow card) 58'; Marazzi (yellow card) 72'	Stadium: Letzigrund; Attendance: 8,420; Referee: (Switzerland) Stephan Klossner

17 February 2013 Round 20	Luzern	1 - 1	Zürich	Lucerne
13:45	Wiss 2' (yellow card) 38'; Zibung (red card) 67'; Lustenberger (yellow card) 89'	Summary	Chermiti (yellow card) 34'; Béda (yellow card) 62' (goal) 69' (pen.); Schönbächler (yellow card) 64'; Jahović (yellow card) 71'; Benito (yellow card) 86'	Stadium: Swissporarena; Attendance: 11,500; Referee: (Switzerland) Pascal Erlachner

23 February 2013 Round 21	Zürich	4 – 0	BSC Young Boys	Zürich
19:45	Drmić 17'; Chermiti 47'; Gavranović 67'; Jahović 79'	(Report) (in German)		Stadium: Letzigrund; Attendance: 8,599; Referee: (Switzerland) Sébastien Pache

2 March 2013 Round 22	Zürich	3 - 1	Sion	Zürich
19:45 CET (UTC+1)	Drmić 13', 63'; Schönbächler 38'	Summary	N'Djeng 61'	Stadium: Letzigrund; Attendance: 8,325; Referee: Stephan Klossner

6 April 2013 Round 26	Zürich	2 - 4	Grasshopper Club Zürich	Zürich
19:45	Chikhaoui (yellow card) 12'; Béda (yellow card) 21'; Da Costa (yellow card) 21'; Gajic 32' (pen.), 51'; Gavranović (yellow card) 60'; Glarner (yellow card) 68'	(Report) (in German)	12' (pen.) Hajrović; (yellow card) 21' Abrashi; (yellow card) 21' Toko; 25' Lang; (yellow card) 31' (goal) 70' Vilotić; 62' Salatić	Stadium: Letzigrund; Attendance: 16'111; Referee: Adrien Jaccottet (Basel)

14 April 2013 Round 27	Basel	3 – 1	Zürich	St. Jakob-Park, Basel
13:45	A. Frei 55'; Schär 87' (pen.); Salah 88'	(Report) (in German)	25' Drmić	Attendance: 32,328; Referee: Oliver Drachta (Österreich)

8 May 2013 Round 31	Zürich	3 - 1	Basel	Letzigrund, Zürich
20:30	Gajić 69'; Schönbächler 67'; Gavranović (yellow card) 91'; Pedro Henrique (yellow card) 91' (goal) 93'; Ph. Koch (yellow card) 93'	(Report) (in German)	8' Stocker; (yellow card) 30' F. Frei; (yellow card) 44' Streller	Attendance: 14,062; Referee: Nikolaj Hänni

12 May 2013 Round 32	Grasshopper Club Zürich	0 - 1	FC Zürich	Zürich
16:00	Xhaka (yellow card) 9'; Ben Khalifa (yellow card) 27'; Grichting (yellow card) 64'	(Report) (in German)	(yellow card) 54' Benito; 59' Chermiti; (yellow card) 66' R. Koch; (yellow card) 76' Gavranović; (red card) 90+5' Buff	Stadium: Letzigrund; Attendance: 14'700; Referee: Patrick Graf

1 June 2013 Round 36	Sion	4 - 2	Zürich	Sion
20:30 CEST (UTC+2)	Vanczák 54'; Kololli 61'; Karlen 73'; Veloso 86'	Summary	Gavranović 50'; Drmić 56'	Stadium: Stade Tourbillon; Attendance: 6,200; Referee: Alain Bieri (Solothurn)

==== League table ====
===== Results summary =====
Overall								Home						Away					
Pld	W	D	L	GF	GA	GD	Pts	W	D	L	GF	GA	GD	W	D	L	GF	GA	GD
24	9	6	9	35	28	+7	33	5	1	6	16	13	+3	4	5	3	19	15	+4

Last updated: 21 March 2013.
Source: Fussballdaten.de

=== Swiss Cup ===
16 September 2012 1st Round	FC Echallens	0 - 6	FC Zürich	Echallens
15:00	Quentin Rushenguziminega (yellow card) 28'; Jérôme Hyvernaud (red card) 50'; Carl Martinet (yellow card) 55'; Pedro Jimenez (yellow card) 74'	Report	Chiumiento 5'; Gavranović 6', 51', 89'; Drmić (yellow card) 28' (goal) 43', 90+1'	Stadium: Sportplatz 3 Sapins; Attendance: 2,600; Referee: SR Jancevski

10 November 2012 2nd Round	Black Stars Basel	1 - 3	FC Zürich	Basel
15:00	Seyfettin Kalayci 68' (pen.)	Summary	Kajević 18'; Drmić 44'; Jahović 66'	Stadium: Buschwilerhof

9 December 2012 3rd Round	FC Köniz	1 - 5	FC Zürich	Liebefeld
14:00	Jean Tchouga 15'	Summary	Gavranović (yellow card) 29' (goal) 61', 66'; Chiumiento 37', 41'; Davide Mariani 86'	Stadium: Sportplatz Liebefeld-Hessgut; Attendance: 2,650; Referee: Stephan Klossner

27 February 2013 Quarter-finals	FC Wil	2 - 4 (a.e.t.)	FC Zürich	St. Gallen
19:30	Muslin 29'; Ivan Audino 96'	Summary	Gavranović 5'; Gajić 93'; Drmić 114'; Schönbächler 120'	Stadium: AFG Arena; Attendance: 2,950; Referee: Sascha Amhof

17 April 2013 Semi-finals	FC Zürich	1 - 2 (a.e.t.)	Grasshopper Club Zürich	Zürich
19:00	Benito 23'; Chermiti (yellow card) 57'; Koch (yellow card) 68'; Jahović (yellow card) 114'; Gajić (yellow card) 120'	Summary	Zuber (yellow card) 4'; Feltscher 39'; Abrashi (yellow card) 49'; Moritz Bauer (yellow card) 77'; Hajrović 94' (yellow card) 95'	Stadium: Letzigrund; Attendance: 20,507; Referee: (Switzerland) Alain Bieri
