= 2012–13 Servette FC season =

Servette FC
2012–13 season
- Stadium: Stade de Genève, Lancy, Switzerland
- Swiss Cup: Entering into 1st Round
- Europa League: Entering into Second qualifying round

The 2012–13 Servette FC season is the 122nd season in club history.

== Matches ==
=== Legend ===
Win Draw Loss Postponed

=== Super League ===
==== League fixtures and results ====
| 13 July 2012 Round 1 | Servette | 0 – 1 | Basel | Carouge |
| 19:45 | | Report | D. Degen 59' | Stadium: Stade de Genève; Attendance: 8,132; Referee: Sascha Kever |

| 22 July 2012 Round 2 | Sion | 1 – 0 | Servette | Sion |
| 13:45 | Manset 86' (pen.) | Report | | Stadium: Stade Tourbillon; Attendance: 14,500; Referee: Adrien Jaccottet |

| 29 July 2012 Round 3 | Lausanne | 5 – 1 | Servette | Lausanne |
| 13:45 | Sanogo 24', 70'; Malonga 45'; Roux 52'; Moussilou 64' | Report | Katz 2' (o.g.) | Stadium: Stade Olympique de la Pontaise; Attendance: 7,800; Referee: Alain Bieri |

| 5 August 2012 Round 4 | Servette | 1 – 1 | Young Boys | Carouge |
| 16:00 | Karanović 41' (pen.) | Report | Farnerud 25' | Stadium: Stade de Genève; Attendance: 4,819; Referee: Daniel Wermelinger |

| 12 August 2012 Round 5 | Grasshopper | 1 – 0 | Servette | Zürich |
| 13:45 | Ben Khalifa 51' | Report | | Stadium: Letzigrund; Attendance: 6,050; Referee: Stephan Studer |

| 19 August 2012 Round 6 | Servette | 1 – 1 | Zürich | Carouge |
| 13:45 | Eudis 15' | Report | Chiumiento 45+3' | Stadium: Stade de Genève; Attendance: 5,125; Referee: Patrick Graf |

| 26 August 2012 Round 7 | Servette | 0 – 2 | Luzern | Carouge |
| 13:45 | | Report | Stahel 37'; Gygax 65' | Stadium: Stade de Genève; Attendance: 6,165; Referee: Sascha Amhof |

| 2 September 2012 Round 8 | Thun | 3 – 0 | Servette | Thun |
| 13:45 | Schneuwly 7'; Ferreira 67'; Ngamukol 90' | Report | | Stadium: Arena Thun; Attendance: 5,069; Referee: Daniel Wermelinger |

| 23 September 2012 Round 9 | St. Gallen | 2 – 0 | Servette | St. Gallen |
| 13:45 | Moubandje 7' (o.g.); Etoundi 72' | Report | | Stadium: AFG Arena; Attendance: 15,153; Referee: Cyril Zimmermann |

| 26 September 2012 Round 10 | Servette | 0 – 1 | Lausanne | Carouge |
| 19:45 | | Report | Malonga 25' | Stadium: Stade de Genève; Attendance: 15,153; Referee: Cyril Zimmermann |

| 30 September 2012 Round 11 | Young Boys | 6 – 2 | Servette | Bern |
| 13:45 | Nuzzolo 3'; Frey 25'; Bobadilla 38', 54'; Costanzo 70'; Lecjaks 81' | Report | Pont 72'; Kouassi 90' | Stadium: Stade de Suisse; Referee: Sascha Amhof |

| 7 October 2012 Round 12 | FC Basel | 3 – 2 | Servette | St. Jakob-Park, Basel |
| 16:00 | Schär 36'; D. Degen 37'; Streller 52' | (FCB Report) (in German) | Tréand 12'; Lang 65' | Attendance: 27,199; Referee: Cyril Zimmermann |

| 28 October 2012 Round 14 | Servette | 2 – 0 | Grasshopper Club Zürich | Lancy |
| 13:45 | S. Lang 9'; Kusunga (yellow card) 26'; Pont (yellow card) 44'; Eudis (yellow card) 68'; Pasche 87' | (Report) (in German) | (yellow card) 64' Zuber; (yellow card) 66' Pavlović; (yellow card) 78' Xhaka | Stadium: Stade de Genève; Attendance: 5'834; Referee: Nikolaj Hänni |

| 18 November 2012 Round 16 | Servette | 0 - 2 | Sion | Geneva |
| 13:45 CET (UTC+1) | | Summary | Lafferty 45+1' (pen.); Itaperuna 77' | Stadium: Stade de Genève; Attendance: 11,923; Referee: Damien Carrel |

| 24 November 2012 Round 17 | Zürich | 0 - 2 | Servette | Zürich |
| 19:45 | Gajić (yellow card) 56'; Buff (yellow card) 77'; Koch (yellow card) 83' | Summary | Marcos De Azevedo (yellow card) 27'; Routis (yellow card) 53'; Tréand 60'; Eudis 62'; Diallo (yellow card) 90+1' | Stadium: Letzigrund; Attendance: 9,705; Referee: (Switzerland) Fedayi San (Gebenstorf) |

| 9 February 2013 Round 19 | Servette | 0 – 1 | Grasshopper Club Zürich | Lancy |
| 19:45 | Kusunga (yellow card) 24'; Pasche (yellow card) 66'; Pont (yellow card) 69'; Kouassi (yellow card) 84'; Eudis (yellow card) 89' | (Report) (in German) | (yellow card) 30' Hajrović; (yellow card) 44' Abrashi; (yellow card) 57' Lang; (yellow card) 77' Vilotić; 79' Brahimi | Stadium: Stade de Genève; Attendance: 4'830; Referee: Alain Bieri (Solothurn) |

| 3 March 2013 Round 22 | Servette | 1 – 2 | Basel | Stade de Genève, Geneva |
| 13:45 | Kossoko (yellow card) 16'; Karanović 45+1'; Kouassi (red card) 61' | (FCB Report) (in German) | (yellow card) 19' F. Frei; 29', 63' (yellow card) 48' (red card) 64' Dragović; (yellow card) 45' Zoua | Attendance: 7,519; Referee: Sascha Amhof |

| 30 March 2013 Round 25 | Sion | 1 - 1 | Servette | Sion |
| 17:45 CET (UTC+1) | Itaperuna 61'; Adaílton (yellow card) 23' (yellow-red card) 63' | Summary | De Azevedo 77' | Stadium: Stade Tourbillon; Attendance: 11,800; Referee: Alain Bieri (Solothurn) |

| 27 April 2013 Round 29 | Servette | Postponed | Sion | Geneva |
| 19:45 CEST (UTC+2) | | Summary | | Stadium: Stade de Genève; Referee: Stephan Klossner |

| 4 May 2013 Round 30 | Grasshopper Club Zürich | 2 - 0 | Servette | Zürich |
| 19:45 | Zuber (yellow card) 9'; Hajrović (yellow card) 75'; Gashi 90+1'; Ben Khalifa (yellow card) 81' (goal) 90+4' | (Report) (in German) | (yellow card) 48' Tréand | Stadium: Letzigrund; Attendance: 4,050; Referee: Alain Bieri (Solothurn) |

| 11 May 2013 Round 32 | Basel | 2 - 0 | Servette | St. Jakob-Park, Basel |
| 13:45 | Stocker 32'; Dragović 42' | (Report) (in German) | (yellow card) 56' Rüfli | Attendance: 26,787; Referee: Stephan Klossner |

| 22 May 2013 29 Postscript | Servette | 4 - 0 | Sion | Geneva |
| 19:45 CEST (UTC+2) | Vitkieviez 2'; Tréand 19'; Karanović 55', 68' | Summary | | Stadium: Stade de Genève; Attendance: 10,622; Referee: Stephan Klossner |

==== League table ====
===== Results summary =====
| Overall | | | | | | | | Home | | | | | | Away | | | | | |
| Pld | W | D | L | GF | GA | GD | Pts | W | D | L | GF | GA | GD | W | D | L | GF | GA | GD |
|---|---|---|---|---|---|---|---|---|---|---|---|---|---|---|---|---|---|---|---|
| 24 | 3 | 7 | 14 | 18 | 38 | −20 | 16 | 2 | 4 | 7 | 8 | 14 | −6 | 1 | 3 | 7 | 10 | 24 | −14 |

Last updated: 21 March 2013.
Source: Fussballdaten.de

=== Swiss Cup ===
| 1st Round | v |

=== UEFA Europa League ===
==== Qualifying rounds ====
===== Second qualifying round =====
| 19 July 2012 1st Leg | (Switzerland) Servette | 2 – 0 | (Armenia) Gandzasar | Geneva |
| 19:45 | Karanović 48'; Gissi 79' | Report | | Stadium: Stade de Genève; Attendance: 5,830; Referee: Damir Batinić (Federation) |

| 26 July 2012 2nd Leg | (Armenia) Gandzasar | 1 – 3 | (Switzerland) Servette | Yerevan |
| 17:00 | Avagyan 90+1' | Report | De Azevedo 47'; Pont 64', 68' | Stadium: Republican Stadium; Attendance: 1,500; Referee: Eiko Saar (Estonia) |

===== Third qualifying round =====
| 2 August 2012 1st Leg | (Switzerland) Servette | 1 – 1 | (Norway) Rosenborg | Geneva |
| 19:45 | Schneider 68' | Report | Dočkal 81' | Stadium: Stade de Genève; Attendance: 5,722; Referee: Simon Lee Evans (Wales) |

| 9 August 2012 2nd Leg | (Norway) Rosenborg | 0 – 0 | (Switzerland) Servette | Trondheim |
| 19:00 | | Report | | Stadium: Lerkendal Stadion; Attendance: 6,725; Referee: Neil Doyle (Republic of Ireland) |
