= Berat Djimsiti =

Albanian footballer (born 1993)

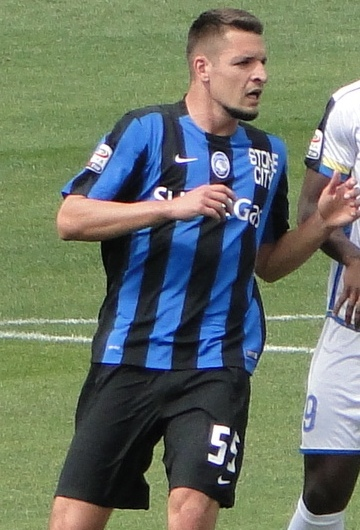
- Djimsiti with Atalanta in 2016

Personal information
- Full name: Berat Djimsiti-Gjimshiti
- Date of birth: 19 February 1993 (age 33)
- Place of birth: Zürich, Switzerland
- Height: 1.90 m (6 ft 3 in)
- Position: Centre-back

Team information
- Current team: Al-Diriyah
- Number: 19

Youth career
- –2007: Zürich-Affoltern
- 2007–2012: Zürich

Senior career*
Years	Team	Apps	(Gls)
2009–2012	Zürich U21	46	(6)
2011–2016	Zürich	110	(5)
2016–2026	Atalanta	254	(5)
2016–2017	→ Avellino (loan)	35	(0)
2017–2018	→ Benevento (loan)	30	(0)
2026–	Al-Diriyah	10	(0)

International career^{‡}
2011	Switzerland U18	3	(0)
2011–2012	Switzerland U19	9	(0)
2013–2014	Switzerland U21	5	(0)
2015–	Albania	79	(1)
- * Club domestic league appearances and goals as of 30 October 2026 ‡ National team caps and goals as of 15 November 2026

Berat Djimsiti (also spelled Gjimshiti or Xhimshiti; Albanian pronunciation: [ˈbɛɾat d͡ʒimˈsiti]; born 19 February 1993) is a professional footballer who plays as a centre-back for Saudi Pro League club Al-Diriyah and captains the Albania national team.

He began his senior career with Zürich, winning the Swiss Cup title in 2013–14 season, before joining Atalanta in 2016, where he later won the UEFA Europa League in the 2023–24 season.

Djimsiti represented Switzerland at various youth international levels before switching his allegiance to Albania, making his senior debut in 2015 during the UEFA Euro 2016 qualifying campaign. Although Albania qualified for the tournament for the first time in history, Djimsiti was not included in the final squad. He later became captain of the national team and led Albania during the UEFA Euro 2024 campaign.

Djimsiti has been noted for his physical strength and height (1.90 m), and in addition to playing as a central defender he is also capable of playing as a full‑back without issues.

== Club career ==
=== Zürich ===
Djimsiti was born in Zürich, Switzerland, and is of Albanian origin from the Preševo Valley in Serbia. He grew up in Zürich-Affoltern and began his youth career at Zürich-Affoltern, before joining the Zürich academy in 2007, where he entered the under-15 team. Djimsiti progressed through Zürich's youth teams, representing the U16, U17 and U18 sides before joining the club's U21 team in 2009. He made 46 appearances and scored six goals for the reserves over three seasons in the Swiss 1. Liga.

Djimsiti was first named on Zürich's senior bench on 19 April 2011, in a 2–1 league win over Young Boys. He was also named among the substitutes for the UEFA Champions League play-off first leg against Bayern Munich on 17 August 2011. Djimsiti made his professional debut on 3 March 2012 as an 84th-minute substitute in a 1–0 home defeat to Sion. On 17 April, Zürich extended his contract until the summer of 2015 and confirmed his promotion to the first-team squad for the following season, where he was set to replace Heinz Barmettler, whose contract was not renewed. He scored his first goal for Zürich on 20 May, netting the winner in a 1–0 away victory over Grasshopper.

==== Breakthrough and European campaigns (2012–2015) ====
In the 2012–13 season, Djimsiti established himself as a regular starter in central defence, making 34 appearances in the Swiss Super League, including 32 starts, and providing one assist. Following Jorge Teixeira's loan move to Siena in January 2013, Djimsiti became an increasingly indispensable part of Zürich's central defence. SRF also highlighted his potential for a major career, while noting occasional technical errors in his game. Zürich finished fourth in the league, qualifying for the Europa League third qualifying round. In the Swiss Cup, Djimsiti featured in three matches as Zürich reached the semi-finals, where they lost 2–1 to city rivals Grasshopper after extra time on 17 April. On 5 August, Zürich extended Djimsiti's contract until the summer of 2016, one year longer than his previous deal.

Djimsiti started the 2013–14 season by scoring a 93rd-minute winner in the opening Super League match against Thun on 14 July 2013, securing a 3–2 victory after coming on as a substitute. In the UEFA Europa League third qualifying round, he played the full 90 minutes in both legs against Slovan Liberec in August 2013, as Zürich were eliminated 4–2 on aggregate. He later acknowledged that his performances had been less convincing during the first half of the season, but said the tactical changes introduced during the winter break suited his more attacking style of play. He made 26 league appearances as Zürich finished fifth. In the Swiss Cup, Djimsiti played in all three of Zürich's matches from the quarter-finals onward, as the club won the competition with a 2–0 victory over Basel after extra time in the final, securing qualification for the Europa League play-off round the following season.

In the Europa League play-off round, Djimsiti played in both legs against Spartak Trnava in August 2014, as Zürich qualified for the group stage with a 4–2 aggregate victory. On 14 September, he scored in a 4–1 league win over Sion, as Zürich moved to the top of the Swiss Super League. Four days later Djimsiti made his debut in a major UEFA club competition, playing the full match in a 3–2 away defeat to Apollon Limassol in the Europa League group stage. He scored his first goal in the competition on 27 November, equalising in the 31st minute of the return match against Apollon, eight minutes after the Cypriot side had taken the lead, as Zürich went on to win 3–1. Djimsiti featured in Zürich's first five group-stage matches, starting all five and playing 434 minutes, before missing the final match against Borussia Mönchengladbach on 11 December through injury, as Zürich lost 3–0 away and finished third in Group A, being eliminated from the competition. On 21 May 2015, he scored his second league goal, equalising in the 52nd minute in a 2–2 draw against Vaduz. He made 33 league appearances, including 31 starts, collecting around 2800 minutes of play, making him Zürich's most-used player in the league that season, as the club finished third, qualifying for the Europa League third qualifying round. In the Swiss Cup, Djimsiti played in both of Zürich's matches, as they defeated Grasshopper 1–0 after extra time in the quarter-finals before losing 1–0 to Sion in the semi-finals.

In the 2015–16 UEFA Europa League third qualifying round, Djimsiti played every minute of both legs against Dinamo Minsk, as Zürich were eliminated after extra time in the second leg. In the first half of the Super League season, he made 15 appearances, starting 12 matches and coming on as a substitute in three. In the Swiss Cup, he made three appearances, starting once and coming on as a substitute twice, as Zürich reached the quarter-finals with a 3–1 win over Young Boys in the round of 16. On 17 January 2016, Zürich and Djimsiti mutually agreed to terminate his contract, allowing him to seek regular playing time ahead of UEFA Euro 2016, having made 135 competitive appearances and scored six goals for the club.

=== Atalanta ===
On 18 January 2016, Djimsiti joined Serie A side Atalanta on a three-and-a-half-year contract and was assigned the number 55 for the remainder of the 2015–16 Serie A season. Djimsiti however remained an unused substitute in several matches in Serie A, with manager Edy Reja later explaining that he had been disadvantaged by the lack of an opportunity to resolve the situations of other defenders during the January transfer window. He made his debut on 2 May 2016, starting in a 2–1 away defeat to Napoli, and played the full 90 minutes in each of Atalanta's final three league matches of the season.

==== 2016–17 season: Loan to Avellino ====
On 31 August 2016, Djimsiti was loaned to Serie B side Avellino. He later explained that, although Atalanta initially preferred to keep him, he had requested the move to gain regular playing time.

Djimsiti established himself as a regular starter, making 35 appearances in 2016–17 Serie B, all from the start. On 25 October 2016, he was praised for his defensive performance in a 1–0 win over Ternana. Avellino finished 14th in the league, securing their place in Serie B for the following season, and Djimsiti returned to Atalanta at the end of his loan spell.

==== 2017–18 season: Loan to Benevento ====
On 8 July 2017, Djimsiti moved on loan to newly promoted Serie A side Benevento until the end of the season, with buying option.

He made his debut on 1 October 2017, starting and playing the full 90 minutes in the 2–1 away loss to Inter Milan. On 19 November 2017, Benevento recorded its 13th consecutive defeat, setting a negative record for the most consecutive losses in Europe's top leagues, after conceding a decisive goal in the 94th minute, with Djimsiti part of the squad during this period. On 30 December 2017, Djimsiti played the full 90 minutes in Benevento's first Serie A victory, a 1–0 home win over Chievo during matchday 19. On 29 January 2018, despite a defeat against Torino, Djimsiti was rated as the best defender of his team by Italian media. On 6 February 2018, Djimsiti received criticism for a challenge on Dries Mertens during Benevento's 2–0 home defeat to Napoli, resulting in a booking. On 18 February 2018, Djimsiti provided an assist for the winning goal in a 3–2 victory over Crotone, setting up Cheick Diabaté’s goal in the 89th minute. On 8 April 2018, Djimsiti conceded a penalty in Benevento’s defeat against Juventus after a challenge on Miralem Pjanić. On 17 April 2018, Djimsiti delivered a solid performance in a 2–2 draw against Sassuolo, despite the club having already been relegated. On 22 April 2018, Djimsiti played the full match in Benevento’s 1–0 away win over Milan, receiving positive ratings from Italian media.

In total, during the 2017–18 Serie A season, Djimsiti made 30 league appearances, all as a starter and completing the full 90 minutes in each match, as Benevento recorded three additional victories during the campaign, including a 3–0 home win over Hellas Verona on matchday 27.

==== 2018–19 season: Return to Atalanta and breakthrough ====
Djimsiti returned to Atalanta ahead of the 2018–19 season. He made his European debut for the club in mid-August 2018, starting in the second leg of the 2018–19 UEFA Europa League qualifying third round against Hapoel Haifa, which Atalanta won 2–0 to advance 6–1 on aggregate. He went on to play regularly under manager Gian Piero Gasperini, establishing himself as a regular starter. In league play, he made his first appearance of the 2018–19 Serie A campaign on 20 August in a 4–0 win against Frosinone. On 10 September 2018, Atalanta offered Djimsiti a new contract, extending his stay with the club until 2023 and included a wage increase of his salary to €300,000 per season. He scored his first goal for Atalanta on 11 November, heading in the team’s third goal in a 4–1 home win over Inter Milan, which ended the visitors’ six-match winning streak. On 26 December 2018, Djimsiti scored an own goal in a 2–2 draw against Juventus and received a low rating from some Italian media for his performance. On 20 January 2019, during matchday 20, Djimsiti provided an assist in Atalanta's 5–0 away victory over Frosinone. On 11 May 2019, Djimsiti provided an assist for Timothy Castagne in a 2–1 win over Sassuolo. In the Serie A, Atalanta finished third in the standings, securing qualification for the 2019–20 UEFA Champions League. During the 2018–19 Coppa Italia, Djimsiti played every minute in all of Atalanta's matches from the round of 16 to the final, where Atalanta finished as runners‑up after losing 2–0 to Lazio on 15 May 2019.

==== 2019–2021: Champions League debut and rise ====
Djimsiti made his UEFA Champions League debut on 18 September 2019, playing the full 90 minutes in a 4–0 defeat against Dinamo Zagreb on Matchday 1 of the 2019–20 UEFA Champions League Group C. On 7 December 2019, Djimsiti scored the winning goal in a 3–2 win against Hellas Verona; his decisive goal came in the 93rd minute, completing Atalanta's comeback after falling behind twice during the match. During the 2019–20 UEFA Champions League group stage, Djimsiti played in Atalanta's 3–0 away win against Shakhtar Donetsk on 11 December 2019, which secured the club's first-ever qualification to the round of 16. Atalanta began their debut Champions League campaign with three consecutive defeats, but recovered to earn seven points and advance from the group stage. On 15 February 2020, Djimsiti provided an assist against Roma in the 50th minute, winning an aerial duel and setting up José Luis Palomino, who scored into an empty net. On 21 June 2020, Djimsiti scored the opening goal in the 16th minute by header in a 4–1 home win against Sassuolo in the matchday 26. By July 2020, Djimsiti had established himself as an important first-team player in Atalanta's defence, as the club finished among the top three teams in league and reached the quarter-finals of the Champions League after eliminating Valencia. In league play, he scored two goals in 26 appearances and recorded 19 shots, largely from set-piece situations. Defensively, he registered 155 successful interventions, including 73 aerial duels won.

On 17 December 2020, Djimsiti made his 100th Serie A appearance for Atalanta in a 1–1 draw away to Juventus. In Atalanta's 0–0 home draw with Genoa on 17 January 2021, Djimsiti completed 9 of 10 duels and achieved an 83% pass accuracy, finishing as one of his team's top-rated performers in the match. On 10 March 2021, Djimsiti was praised for his performance in Atalanta's match against Inter, in which he recorded a technical efficiency rating of 97% and covered 9.3 kilometres, contributing to limiting Romelu Lukaku’s impact over the full 90 minutes. In the 2020–21 Serie A season, Djimsiti made 33 appearances, provided two assists and received eight yellow cards during the campaign. Atalanta finished 3rd in the standings for the third consecutive time. During the 2020–21 Coppa Italia, Djimsiti played in all of Atalanta's matches from the round of 16 through to the semi-finals. On 10 February 2021, Djimsiti made his 100th appearance for Atalanta in all competitions during the semi-final second-leg win over Napoli, which secured Atalanta's place in the final. In the 2021 Coppa Italia Final, Atalanta lost 2–1 to Juventus on 19 May 2021; Djimsiti came on as a substitute in the 76th minute. During the season, Djimsiti played 46 matches in all competitions, including eight appearances in the 2020–21 UEFA Champions League, in which he played every minute of Atalanta's campaign; he scored one goal and provided three assists, while recording 257 ball recoveries in Serie A, ranking second among Atalanta players during the league campaign.

==== 2021–2024: Europa League heroics ====
On 27 November 2021, Djimsiti provided the assist for Atalanta's winning goal in their 1–0 victory over Juventus. On 17 February 2022, Djimsiti scored a brace in the first leg of the 2021–22 UEFA Europa League knockout round play-off against Olympiacos, which Atalanta won 2–1; he was described as Atalanta's hero by UEFA. On 8 May 2022, Djimsiti scored in a 3–1 away victory over Spezia.

Djimsiti had suffered an injury in late August 2022 that kept him sidelined for several months, before returning to action for Atalanta on 23 October 2022, coming on as a substitute at the start of the second half in a 2–0 home defeat against Lazio. On 3 May 2023, Djimsiti provided an assist from a corner kick for Luis Muriel’s 100th Serie A goal during Atalanta’s 3–2 home victory over Spezia.

On 9 November 2023, Djimsiti scored the winning goal of the match against Sturm Graz in the 50th minute in a 1–0 win in the 2023–24 UEFA Europa League Group D, helping the club maintain their unbeaten run in the group and secure qualification to the knockout stage. On 10 March 2024, Djimsiti provided an assist for Teun Koopmeiners’ equalising goal during Atalanta's 2–2 away draw against Juventus. On 18 April 2024, Atalanta advanced to the semi-finals of the Europa League after eliminating Liverpool 3–1 on aggregate, despite a 1–0 home defeat in the second leg, in which Djimsiti was rated the best player on the pitch. Later, he was named "Player of the Week" in recognition of his defensive performance. During the 2023–24 Coppa Italia, Djimsiti appeared in all of Atalanta's matches from the round of 16 through to the final, where Atalanta finished as runners‑up after losing 1–0 to Juventus on 15 May 2024. Djimsiti was present for the full 90 minutes in the 2024 UEFA Europa League final against Bayer Leverkusen, where Atalanta won to secure the trophy.

==== Milestones and last seasons (2024–2026) ====
On 2 October 2024, Djimsiti scored in the 2024–25 UEFA Champions League league phase during away match against Shakhtar Donetsk, opening the scoring in a 1–0 lead after finishing from close range following a cross by Ademola Lookman. On 6 November 2024, Djimsiti was named in the UEFA Champions League Team of the Round 4 following Atalanta's 2–0 away win against VfB Stuttgart in the league phase. On 16 December 2024, Djimsiti reached 200 appearances in Serie A with Atalanta and he was ranked among the club's most consistent defenders since 2019, recording 392 tackles won, 257 interceptions and 790 duels won, while also leading Atalanta's defensive unit in key metrics compared to his teammates in recent seasons. On 1 February 2025, Djimsiti scored the opening goal with a header in Atalanta's 1–1 draw against Torino.

On 30 September 2025, Djimsiti became the first player of the Albania national team to reach 30 appearances in the UEFA Champions League. On 5 November 2025, Djimsiti made his 300th appearance for Atalanta in the 1–0 win over Marseille in the League phase of the UEFA Champions League. In December 2025, Djimsiti scored in the round of 16 of the 2025–26 Coppa Italia against Genoa, giving his team a 1–0 lead. On 9 February 2026, Djimsiti had a late goal disallowed for offside during a 2–1 home win over Cremonese. On 11 April 2026, Djimsiti made his 328th appearance for Atalanta in a match against Juventus, becoming the centre-back with the most appearances in the club's history and moving into fourth place on the club's all-time appearance list, surpassing Valter Bonacina, with only Mario Pašalić, Gianpaolo Bellini and Marten de Roon ahead of him.

=== Diriyah ===
On 10 August 2026, Djimsiti transferred to Diriyah in Saudi Arabia.

== International career ==
=== Switzerland ===
Djimsiti represented Switzerland at youth international levels, playing for the U18, U19 and U21 teams between 2011 and 2014 in both friendly matches and official qualifying competitions, making around 20 appearances across the age groups.

=== Albania ===
In September 2014, Djimsiti was contacted by Albania national team head coach Gianni De Biasi, who invited him to represent Albania, prompting him to consider switching from Swiss international allegiance. In the same month, he declined an invitation from Kosovo. He officially received Albanian citizenship on 15 July 2015, alongside Swiss-Albanian footballers, twins Albian Ajeti and Adonis Ajeti of FC Basel. He confirmed his decision to represent Albania at international level. On 27 August 2015, Djimsiti, together with Arlind Ajeti and Naser Aliji, received FIFA approval to switch international allegiance, making him eligible to represent Albania in competitive matches, including UEFA Euro 2016 qualifying.

Djimsiti received his first call-up for the UEFA Euro 2016 qualifying Group I matches against Denmark and Portugal on 4 and 7 September 2015, respectively. He made his debut against Denmark, playing as a right back due to the absence of the injured Elseid Hysaj, completing the full 90 minutes as Albania secured an away goalless draw. On 11 October 2015, he scored his first international goal in a 3–0 away win against Armenia, which secured Albania its first ever qualification to a major tournament.

On 21 May 2016, Djimsiti was named in Albania's preliminary 27-man squad for UEFA Euro 2016. He was later omitted from the final 23-man squad announced on 31 May 2016.

In September 2016 he returned to the national team ahead of the 2018 FIFA World Cup qualification campaign. Following the retirement of Lorik Cana from international football and the absence of the injured Arlind Ajeti, Djimsiti became a regular starter and featured in the first half of the qualification campaign. On 12 November 2016, on matchday four of the qualification campaign against Israel, Djimsiti was sent off after conceding a penalty in the 17th minute following a foul from behind, as Albania finished the match with nine men after his teammate Etrit Berisha was also dismissed, ending in a 3–0 defeat.

In the inaugural edition of the UEFA Nations League, Djimsiti was named a starter by coach Christian Panucci for 2018–19 UEFA Nations League C matches, playing nearly full 90 minutes in all four games as Albania recorded one win and three losses, finishing last in Group 1 of the three-team group.

Djimsiti did not miss any of Albania's first 12 UEFA Nations League matches, becoming the joint record-holder for most appearances in the competition alongside Frédéric Veseli.

During the UEFA Euro 2024 qualifying Group E, after missing the opening match against Poland in March 2023, Djimsiti was ever-present for Albania in the remaining fixtures, helping the team concede only three goals and remain unbeaten for the rest of the campaign. On 20 June 2023, Djimsiti made his 50th appearance in a 3–1 away win against the Faroe Islands. Midway through the campaign, on 7 September 2023 away to the Czech Republic, he was appointed captain of the national team by head coach Sylvinho, ahead of Etrit Berisha and Elseid Hysaj for the remainder of the qualifying campaign, with Sylvinho citing Djimsiti's calmness on the pitch and leadership qualities as the main reasons for the decision. Albania also recorded four wins and three draws, finishing top of the group for the first time in its history with 15 points—level with the Czech Republic but ahead on head-to-head—and qualified for the final tournament of a European Championship for only the second time.

He was named in Albania's 26-man squad for the final UEFA Euro 2024 tournament in Germany. In the UEFA Euro 2024 Group B, Djimsiti retained his role as captain and was ever-present in all three group matches, where Albania lost 2–1 to Italy and drew 2–2 with Croatia, despite taking an early lead in both fixtures, before finishing the group with a 1–0 defeat to Spain, the eventual tournament winners.

Djimsiti captained Albania during the 2026 FIFA World Cup qualification – UEFA Group K campaign, with the team qualifying to the play-off round for the first time in their history.

In December 2025, he was awarded the "National Team Player of the Year" during the "Ballon D'or Albania" ceremony, after a selection made by the players of the Albania national team.

In the play-off round, Albania were eliminated following a 2–1 defeat to Poland on 26 March 2026, with Djimsiti captaining the team and playing the full match.

== Personal life ==
Djimsiti is by an ethnic Albanian family from the village of Tërnoc i Madh near Bujanoc, and is part of the Albanian minority in Serbia. Berat has an older brother, Bilent. Since 2012, Djimsiti has been in a relationship with Serbian model Alisa Menković. They have three children together: a son, Lion Aron, born in September 2020; a daughter, Adria Jela, born in July 2023; and a son, Aron Noah, born in January 2025.

== Career statistics ==
=== Club ===
As of match played 30 October 2026

Appearances and goals by club, season and competition
Club	Season	League			National cup (Note: Includes Swiss Cup, Coppa Italia, King's Cup)		Continental		Other		Total	
Club	Season	Division	Apps	Goals	Apps	Goals	Apps	Goals	Apps	Goals	Apps	Goals
Zürich U21	2009–10	Swiss 1. Liga	3	0	—		—		—		3	0
Zürich U21	2010–11	Swiss 1. Liga	27	5	—		—		—		27	5
Zürich U21	2011–12	Swiss 1. Liga	16	1	—		—		—		16	1
Zürich U21	Total		46	6	—		—		—		46	6
Zürich	2010–11	Swiss Super League	1	0	—		—		—		1	0
Zürich	2011–12	Swiss Super League	2	1	—		0	0	—		2	1
Zürich	2012–13	Swiss Super League	34	0	5	0	—		—		39	0
Zürich	2013–14	Swiss Super League	26	1	3	0	2 (Note: Appearances in UEFA Europa League)	0	—		31	1
Zürich	2014–15	Swiss Super League	33	2	3	0	7	1	—		43	3
Zürich	2015–16	Swiss Super League	15	1	3	0	2	0	—		20	1
Zürich	Total		111	5	14	0	11	1	—		136	6
Atalanta	2015–16	Serie A	3	0	—		—		—		3	0
Atalanta	2018–19	Serie A	24	1	4	0	1	0	—		29	1
Atalanta	2019–20	Serie A	34	2	1	0	6 (Note: Appearances in UEFA Champions League)	0	—		41	2
Atalanta	2020–21	Serie A	33	0	5	1	8	0	—		46	1
Atalanta	2021–22	Serie A	31	1	1	0	9 (Note: Five appearances in UEFA Champions League, four appearances and two goals in UEFA Europa League)	2	—		41	3
Atalanta	2022–23	Serie A	24	0	2	0	—		—		26	0
Atalanta	2023–24	Serie A	37	0	5	0	12	1	—		54	1
Atalanta	2024–25	Serie A	34	1	2	0	9	1	2 (Note: One appearance in UEFA Super Cup, one appearance in Supercoppa Italiana)	0	47	2
Atalanta	2025–26	Serie A	34	0	3	1	10	0	—		47	1
Atalanta	Total		254	5	23	2	55	4	2	0	334	11
Avellino (loan)	2016–17	Serie B	35	0	0	0	—		—		35	0
Benevento (loan)	2017–18	Serie A	30	0	0	0	—		—		30	0
Al-Diriyah	2026–27	Saudi Pro League	10	0	1	0	—		—		11	0
Career total			486	15	38	2	66	5	2	0	592	22

=== International ===
As of match played 15 November 2026

Appearances and goals by national team and year
National team	Year	Apps	Goals
Albania	2015	6	1
Albania	2016	6	0
Albania	2017	2	0
Albania	2018	7	0
Albania	2019	8	0
Albania	2020	6	0
Albania	2021	9	0
Albania	2022	4	0
Albania	2023	7	0
Albania	2024	6	0
Albania	2025	8	0
Albania	2026	10	0
Total		79	1

Scores and results list Albania's goal tally first, score column indicates score after each Djimsiti goal.

List of international goals scored by Berat Djimsiti
No.	Date	Venue	Cap	Opponent	Score	Result	Competition
1	11 October 2015	Vazgen Sargsyan Republican Stadium, Yerevan, Armenia	4	Armenia	2–0	3–0	UEFA Euro 2016 qualifying

== Honours ==
FC Zürich

- Swiss Cup: 2013–14

Atalanta

- UEFA Europa League: 2023–24

Individual

- UEFA Europa League Team of the Season: 2023–24
