= 2015–16 Swiss Cup =

Tournament details
- Country: Switzerland
- Teams: 64

Final positions
- Champions: FC Zürich
- Runners-up: FC Lugano

Tournament statistics
- Matches played: 63
- Top goal scorer: Marco Schneuwly (6)

The 2015–16 Swiss Cup is the 91st season of Switzerland's annual football cup competition. The competition started on 15 August 2015 with the first games of Round 1 and ended on 29 May 2016 with the Final, won by FC Zürich. As winners of the competition they qualified for the group stage of the 2016–17 UEFA Europa League. The reigning title holders were Sion.

== Participating clubs ==
All teams from 2014–15 Super League and 2014–15 Challenge League as well as the top 4 teams from 2014–15 Promotion League automatically entered this year's competition. The remaining 41 teams had to qualify through separate qualifying rounds within their leagues. Reserve teams and teams from Liechtenstein are not allowed in the competition, the latter only enter the 2015–16 Liechtenstein Cup.

2015–16 Super League; 9 teams	2015–16 Challenge League; 10 teams	2015–16 Promotion League; 9 teams	2015–16 1. Liga; 12 teams	2015–16 2. Liga Interregional; 11 teams	2015–16 Regional leagues 13 teams
FC Basel (BS); Grasshopper Zürich (ZH); FC Lugano (TI); FC Luzern (LU); FC Sion ^{TH} (VS); FC St. Gallen (SG); FC Thun (BE); BSC Young Boys (BE); FC Zürich (ZH)	FC Aarau (AG); FC Biel-Bienne (BE); FC Chiasso (TI); FC Lausanne-Sport (VD); FC Le Mont (VD); Neuchâtel Xamax FCS (NE); FC Schaffhausen (SH); FC Wil (SG); FC Winterthur (ZH); FC Wohlen (AG)	FC Breitenrain (BE); SC Brühl (SG); SC Cham (ZG); FC Köniz (BE); SC Kriens (LU); BSC Old Boys (BS); Servette FC (GE); FC Stade Nyonnais (VD); SC YF Juventus (ZH)	FC Azzurri LS (VD); FC Bavois (VD); SC Buochs (NW); SR Delémont (JU); FC La Chaux-de-Fonds (NE); FC Martigny-Sports (VS); FC Münsingen (BE); FC Oberwallis Naters (VS); FC Solothurn (SO); FC United Zürich (ZH); FC Wettswil-Bonstetten (ZH); FC Zug 94 (ZG)	AC Bellinzona (TI); FC Bulle (FR); AS Castello (TI); FC Dardania Lausanne (VD); FC Konolfingen (BE); Meyrin FC (GE); SV Muttenz (BL); FC Red Star Zürich (ZH); FC Sierre (VS); FC Tavannes/Tramelan (BE); FC Uzwil (SG)	Sixth tier: FC Arbon 05 (TG); FC Brunnen (SZ); FC Gontenschwil (AG); FC Grand-Saconnex (GE); FC Härkingen (SO); FC Küsnacht (ZH); FC Matran (FR); FC Pied du Jura (VD); FC Pratteln (BL); FC Ticino (NE); Seventh tier: FC Hausen am Albis (ZH); FC Länggasse (BE); FC Rheineck (SG)

^{TH} Title holders.

== Round 1 ==
Teams from Super League and Challenge League were seeded in this round. In a match, the home advantage was granted to the team from the lower league, if applicable. Teams in bold continue to the next round of the competition.

15 August 2015	**FC Red Star Zürich**	**1-0**	FC Oberwallis Naters	Zürich
16:00	Cyrill Graf 67'	Report		Stadium: Allmend Brunau

15 August 2015	FC Konolfingen	**1-1** (a.e.t.) (**1-4** p)	**FC Martigny-Sports**	Konolfingen
16:30	Christoph Künzi 114'	Report	102' Ramiz Mehmetaj; (red card) 114' Joël Ndongabi	Stadium: Inseli

15 August 2015	FC Uzwil	**0-0** (a.e.t.) (**4-5** p)	**FC Sierre**	Henau
17:00		Report	(red card) 42' Christian Amato	Stadium: Rüti

15 August 2015	FC Pied du Jura	**1-3**	**FC Münsingen**	Apples
17:00	Samy Laubscher 46'	Report	2' David Frey; 31' Christian Plüss; 89' Sandro Christen	Stadium: Terrain les Planches à Apples

15 August 2015	**FC Bulle**	**2-1**	FC Dardania Lausanne	Bulle
17:00	Theo Jaquet 18'; Hakim Khadrouche 44'	Report	75' Gustavo Fernando Batista	Stadium: Stade de Bouleyres

15 August 2015	AS Castello	**0-2**	**FC Lugano**	Mendrisio
17:00		Report	8' Tosetti; 83' (pen.) Bottani	Stadium: Campo comunale Attendance: 1'748

15 August 2015	SC Kriens	**1-2**	**BSC Young Boys**	Kriens
17:30	Sorgić 58'	Report	45', 54' Kubo	Stadium: Kleinfeld; Attendance: 2'312; Referee: Fedayi San

15 August 2015	Meyrin FC	**0-4**	**FC Basel**	Meyrin
18:00		Report	35', 60' Ajeti; 58' Elneny; 61' Delgado	Stadium: Stade des Arbères; Attendance: 2'100; Referee: Lukas Fähndrich

15 August 2015	FC Hausen am Albis	**0-9**	**FC St. Gallen**	Hausen am Albis
18:00		Report	18' Lang; 24', 77' Gotal; 44' Michael Scherrer; 67', 83' Andi Qerfozi; 69' Michael Eisenring; 78' Tafer; 82' Aratore	Stadium: Jonentäli; Attendance: 2'200; Referee: Lukas Fähndrich

15 August 2015	FC Bavois	**1-3**	**FC Wil**	Bavois
18:00	Aziz Demiri 79'	Report	84' Şahin; 88', 90' Santos	Stadium: Terrain des Peupliers; Attendance: 200; Referee: Skalonja

15 August 2015	FC Küsnacht	**2-9**	**FC Wohlen**	Küsnacht
18:00	Bieli 38'; 84' Anthony Bauer	Report	2', 52' Rexhep Thaqi; 12' Simon Dünki; 34', 46', 72' Ramizi; 53' Schultz; 57' Abegglen; 77' Lugo	Stadium: Heslibach; Attendance: 350

15 August 2015	**FC La Chaux-de-Fonds**	**3-1** (a.e.t.)	Zug 94	La Chaux-de-Fonds
18:00	Frédéric Tosato 39'; Julien Pretot 92'; Alhassane Touré 108'	Report	6' (pen.) Dušan Ilić; (red card) 94' Pasquale Martino	Stadium: Stade de la Charrière

15 August 2015	FC Rheineck	**1-7**	**FC Köniz**	Rheineck
18:30	Alessandro Chiarello 90+4' (pen.)	Report	6', 90+3' Altin Osmani; 21' Cristian Miani; 58' Dino Rebronja; 61', 85' Varela; 86' Raphael Walther	Stadium: Stapfenwies

15 August 2015	FC Pratteln	**2-3**	**SV Muttenz**	Pratteln
19:00				Stadium: Stadion Sandgruben

15 August 2015	FC Länggasse	**1-2**	**FC Wettswil-Bonstetten**	Bern
19:00	Matthias Hadorn 11'; Yves Mezger (red card) 90+5'	Report	4' Yannick Waser; 90+4' Oleg Dukhnich	Stadium: Stadion Neufeld

15 August 2015	FC Solothurn	**0-4**	**FC Thun**	Solothurn
19:30		Report	10', 21' Frontino; 63', 85' Munsy	Stadium: Stadion FC Solothurn; Attendance: 1'200; Referee: Sébastien Pache

15 August 2015	SC Buochs	**0-2** (a.e.t.)	**FC Le Mont**	Buochs
20:00		Report	108' Adrian Alvarez; 116' Aurélien Chappuis	Stadium: Seefeld

16 August 2015	SC Cham	**1–4**	**Grasshopper Zürich**	Cham
14:00	Severin Dätwyler 25'; Esat Balaj (yellow card) 89' (red card)	Report	81' Marko Bašić; 82' Tarashaj; 90+2', 90+4' Dabbur	Stadium: Eizmoos; Attendance: 2'345; Referee: Pascal Erlachner

16 August 2015	FC Brunnen	**0–2**	**FC Sion**	Brunnen
14:00				Stadium: Stadion Schoeller-Meyer

16 August 2015	FC Härkingen	**0–4**	**FC Breitenrain**	Härkingen
14:30				Stadium: Sportplatz Aesch

16 August 2015	FC Tavannes/Tramelan	**1–6**	**FC Zürich**	Tramelan
15:00				Stadium: Allianz Suisse Stadium

16 August 2015	FC Stade Nyonnais	**2–2** (a.e.t.) (**1–4** p)	**FC Chiasso**	Nyon
15:00				Stadium: Centre sportif de Colovray

16 August 2015	FC United Zürich	**0–5**	**FC Aarau**	Zürich
15:00				Stadium: Utogrund

16 August 2015	FC Matran	**1–4**	**AC Bellinzona**	Matran
15:00				Stadium: Stade de Matran

16 August 2015	Servette FC	**2–5**	**FC Luzern**	Lancy
15:30				Stadium: Stade de Genève

16 August 2015	SC Brühl	**1–5**	**Neuchâtel Xamax FCS**	St. Gallen
16:00				Stadium: Paul-Grüninger-Stadion

16 August 2015	BSC Old Boys	**1–2**	**FC Schaffhausen**	Basel
16:00				Stadium: Schützenmatte

16 August 2015	SR Delémont	**0–1**	**FC Winterthur**	Delémont
16:00				Stadium: Stade de la Blancherie

16 August 2015	FC Grand-Saconnex	**1–10**	**FC Biel-Bienne**	Collex-Bossy
16:00				Stadium: Stade Marc-Burdet

16 August 2015	FC Ticino	**0–3**	**FC Lausanne-Sport**	Le Locle
16:00				Stadium: Stade des Jeannerets

16 August 2015	FC Arbon 05	**1–4**	**SC YF Juventus**	Arbon
16:00				Stadium: Stacherholz

16 August 2015	FC Gontenschwil	**0–2**	**FC Azzurri LS**	Gontenschwil
16:00				Stadium: Neumättli

== Round 2 ==
The winners of Round 1 played in this round. Teams from Super League were seeded, the home advantage was granted to the team from the lower league, if applicable. Teams in bold continue to the third round.

Team 1	Score	Team 2
**18 September 2015**
FC Lausanne-Sport	0–1	**FC Thun**
**FC Köniz**	3–1	Grasshopper Zürich
**19 September 2015**
**FC Red Star Zürich**	1–1 (a.e.t.) (p. 5–4)	FC Azzurri LS
AC Bellinzona	2–3 (a.e.t.)	**FC Lugano**
FC La Chaux-de-Fonds	0–3	**FC Aarau**
**FC Schaffhausen**	2–1 (a.e.t.)	FC Wil
**FC Winterthur**	1–1 (a.e.t.) (p. 6–5)	FC Biel-Bienne
FC Breitenrain	0–2	**FC St. Gallen**
FC Sierre	0–3	**FC Wettswil-Bonstetten**
FC Wohlen	0–1	**FC Zürich**
**20 September 2015**
SC YF Juventus	1–4	**FC Basel**
FC Münsingen	0–2	**FC Sion**
Neuchâtel Xamax FCS	2–4	**FC Luzern**
FC Martigny-Sports	0–1	**FC Le Mont**
FC Bulle	0–3	**SV Muttenz**
FC Chiasso	0–2	**BSC Young Boys**

== Round 3 ==
The winners of Round 2 played in this round. The home advantage was granted to the team from the lower league. Teams in bold continue to the quarter-finals.

Team 1	Score	Team 2
**28 October 2015**
FC Wettswil-Bonstetten	1–2	**FC Thun**
SV Muttenz	1–5	**FC Basel**
FC Red Star Zürich	1–2	**FC Köniz**
FC St. Gallen	2–3	**FC Luzern**
**29 October 2015**
**FC Aarau**	2–0	FC Le Mont
BSC Young Boys	1–3	**FC Zürich**
FC Schaffhausen	2–3 (a.e.t.)	**FC Sion**
FC Winterthur	0–2	**FC Lugano**

== Quarter-finals ==
The winners of Round 3 played in the Quarter-finals. There was no home advantage granted in the draw. Teams in bold continue to the next round.

12 December 2015	FC Aarau	**3–4**	**FC Luzern**	Aarau
18:00	Nganga 4', 90+3'; Romano 55'		9', 79' Schneuwly; 60' Hyka; 79' Lezcano	Stadium: Stadion Brügglifeld; Attendance: 5,724; Referee: Alain Bieri

12 December 2015	FC Thun	**1–4**	**FC Zürich**	Thun
18:30	Wittwer 11'		50', 71' Etoundi; 57' Grgic; 79' Koch	Stadium: Stockhorn Arena; Attendance: 4,917; Referee: Pascal Erlachner

13 December 2015	**FC Lugano**	**2–0** (a.e.t.)	FC Köniz	Lugano
14:30	Črnigoj 110'; Donis 115'			Stadium: Stadio Cornaredo; Attendance: 1,849; Referee: Sébastien Pache

13 December 2015	**FC Sion**	**2–2** (a.e.t.) (**4–3** p)	FC Basel	Sion
15:30	Pa Modou 37'; Assifuah 66'		79' Elneny; 89' (pen.) Janko	Stadium: Stade de Tourbillon; Attendance: 9,200; Referee: Stephan Klossner
	**Penalties**
	Bia (penalty scored); Ziegler (penalty missed); Salatić (penalty scored); Carlitos (penalty scored); Pa Modou (penalty scored)		(penalty scored) Elneny; (penalty scored) Janko; (penalty missed) Bjarnason; (penalty missed) Samuel; (penalty scored) Callà

== Semi-finals ==
2 March 2016	FC Luzern	**1–2**	**FC Lugano**	Lucerne
19:00	Schneuwly 45+1' (pen.)		Donis 2', 51'	Stadium: Swissporarena; Attendance: 11,107; Referee: Sandro Schärer

2 March 2016	FC Sion	**0–3**	**FC Zürich**	Sion
20:45			10', 43' Kerzhakov; 50' Buff	Stadium: Stade de Tourbillon; Attendance: 9,800; Referee: Adrien Jaccottet

== Final ==
29 May 2016
16:15

FC Lugano	0–1	FC Zürich
		40' Sarr

Letzigrund, Zürich
Attendance: 21,500
Referee: Alain Bieri

Teams

GK	23	(Switzerland) Mirko Salvi
DF	13	(Albania) Frédéric Veseli	(yellow card) 82' (yellow-red card) 90+5'
DF	20	(Croatia) Niko Datković
DF	6	(Italy) Orlando Urbano
DF	3	(Croatia) Goran Jozinović
MF	14	(Uruguay) Jonathan Sabbatini	(yellow card) 42'	(substituted off) 60'
MF	18	(Italy) Mario Piccinocchi
MF	19	(Switzerland) Antoine Rey (c)	(yellow card) 90+2'
FW	7	(North Macedonia) Ezgjan Alioski		(substituted off) 56'
FW	22	(Greece) Anastasios Donis		(substituted off) 70'
FW	10	(Switzerland) Mattia Bottani
Substitutes:
GK	1	(Italy) Alex Valentini
MF	8	(Croatia) Domagoj Pušić
FW	11	(Switzerland) Karim Rossi	(yellow card) 73'	(substituted on) 70'
DF	12	(Uruguay) Matías Malvino
FW	17	(Switzerland) Matteo Tosetti		(substituted on) 56'
MF	21	(Switzerland) Nikola Milosavljevic
MF	33	(Slovenia) Domen Črnigoj		(substituted on) 60'
Manager:
(Czech Republic) Zdeněk Zeman

GK	32	(Switzerland) Anthony Favre	(yellow card) 31'
DF	13	(Switzerland) Alain Nef
DF	25	(Montenegro) Ivan Kecojević
DF	20	(Switzerland) Burim Kukeli		(substituted off) 20'
MF	16	(Switzerland) Philippe Koch		(substituted off) 74'
MF	29	(Senegal) Sangoné Sarr	(yellow card) 17'
MF	37	(Ivory Coast) Gilles Yapi Yapo (c)		(substituted off) 52'
MF	17	(Brazil) Vinícius	(yellow card) 90+1'
FW	15	(Switzerland) Oliver Buff	(yellow card) 71'
FW	33	(Switzerland) Kevin Bua
FW	72	(Russia) Aleksandr Kerzhakov
Substitutes:
GK	31	(Switzerland) Novem Baumann
MF	4	(Senegal) Moussa Koné
MF	6	(Cape Verde) Cabral		(substituted on) 52'
MF	10	(Switzerland) Davide Chiumiento		(substituted on) 74'
MF	22	(Switzerland) Anto Grgić		(substituted on) 20'
MF	23	(Armenia) Artyom Simonyan
FW	30	(Switzerland) Aldin Turkeš
Manager:
(Switzerland) Uli Forte
