= List of Swiss football transfers winter 2018–19 =

This is a list of Swiss football transfers for the 2018–19 winter transfer window by club. Only transfers of clubs in the Swiss Super League are included.

== Swiss Super League ==
Note: Flags indicate national team as has been defined under FIFA eligibility rules. Players may hold more than one non-FIFA nationality.

=== Basel ===
In:

No.	Pos.	Nation	Player

Out:

No.	Pos.	Nation	Player
19	FW	SUI	Dimitri Oberlin (on loan to (Italy) Empoli)
20	MF	CIV	Serey Dié (on loan to Neuchâtel Xamax)
37	FW	ANG	Afimico Pululu (on loan to Neuchâtel Xamax)
—	MF	SUI	Dominik Schmid (on loan to Wil, previously on loan at Lausanne-Sport)

=== Grasshoppers ===
In:

No.	Pos.	Nation	Player
15	FW	MLI	Aly Mallé (on loan from (Italy) Udinese)
29	MF	FRA	Djibril Diani (from Grasshoppers youth)
—	MF	SUI	Mersim Asllani (from Lausanne-Sport)
—	DF	POR	Euclides Cabral (from (Portugal) Sporting U19)

Out:

No.	Pos.	Nation	Player
11	FW	SWE	Nabil Bahoui (released)
14	DF	SUI	Numa Lavanchy (to Lugano)
15	DF	CIV	Souleyman Doumbia (to (France) Stade Rennais)
16	FW	VEN	Jeffrén (to (Cyprus) AEK Larnaca)
—	MF	SVK	Michal Faško (on loan to (Czech Republic) Karviná, previously on loan at (Germany) Eintracht Braunschweig)

=== Lugano ===
In:

No.	Pos.	Nation	Player
16	DF	SUI	Numa Lavanchy (from Grasshoppers)
27	DF	SUI	Cendrim Kameraj (from (Italy) Juventus U23)
32	FW	ALB	Armando Sadiku (from (Spain) Levante)
77	MF	CZE	Roman Macek (from (Italy) Juventus, previously on loan)

Out:

No.	Pos.	Nation	Player
7	DF	ITA	Edoardo Masciangelo (on loan to (Italy) Juventus U23)
27	DF	KOS	Jetmir Krasniqi (on loan to (Romania) Voluntari)
29	FW	SUI	Aziz Binous (on loan to Zürich U21)
32	MF	SUI	Eris Abedini (on loan to Winterthur)
95	FW	ITA	Carlo Manicone (on loan to Chiasso)
—	FW	SUI	Gioele Franzese (on loan to Mendrisio, previously on loan at Wohlen)

=== Luzern ===
In:

No.	Pos.	Nation	Player

Out:

No.	Pos.	Nation	Player
80	MF	GEO	Valerian Gvilia (on loan to (Poland) Górnik Zabrze)

=== Neuchâtel Xamax ===
In:

No.	Pos.	Nation	Player
9	FW	ANG	Afimico Pululu (on loan from Basel)
26	MF	CIV	Serey Dié (on loan from Basel)

Out:

No.	Pos.	Nation	Player
9	MF	CIV	Hamed Koné (released)
18	FW	SUI	Tunahan Cicek (on loan to Schaffhausen)
28	MF	SUI	Liridon Mulaj (on loan to Winterthur)

=== Sion ===
In:

No.	Pos.	Nation	Player
21	FW	SUI	Noah Blasucci (from (Liechtenstein) Vaduz)
23	FW	SUI	Jared Khasa (from Sion youth)
—	DF	FRA	Nathanaël Saintini (from (France) Cholet)

Out:

No.	Pos.	Nation	Player
17	FW	PER	Alexander Succar (loan return to (Peru) Sporting Cristal)
—	MF	SUI	Nikola Milosavljevic (on loan to Chiasso, previously on loan at Winterthur)

=== St. Gallen ===
In:

No.	Pos.	Nation	Player
7	FW	ESP	Víctor Ruiz (from (Spain) Formentera)
27	FW	SUI	Simone Rapp (on loan from Lausanne-Sport)
43	FW	SUI	Jérémy Guillemenot (from (Austria) Rapid Wien)

Out:

No.	Pos.	Nation	Player
26	MF	AUT	Peter Tschernegg (to (Austria) TSV Hartberg)
—	FW	SUI	Patrick Sutter (on loan to Winterthur)

=== Thun ===
In:

No.	Pos.	Nation	Player

Out:

No.	Pos.	Nation	Player
7	DF	SUI	Mickaël Facchinetti (to (Cyprus) APOEL)
19	MF	BIH	Omer Dzonlagic (on loan to Kriens)

=== Young Boys ===
In:

No.	Pos.	Nation	Player
11	MF	GER	Gianluca Gaudino (free agent)

Out:

No.	Pos.	Nation	Player
6	MF	SUI	Leonardo Bertone (to (United States) Cincinnati)
35	MF	CIV	Sékou Sanogo (to (Saudi Arabia) Al-Ittihad)

=== Zürich ===
In:

No.	Pos.	Nation	Player
5	DF	GEO	Levan Kharabadze (on loan from (Georgia (country)) Dinamo Tbilisi)
6	DF	SUI	Joel Untersee (on loan from (Italy) Empoli)
11	FW	ARG	Nicolás Andereggen (on loan from (Argentina) Unión Santa Fe)
40	GK	AUT	Osman Hadžikić (free agent)
50	FW	SUI	Yann Kasaï (from Young Boys youth)

Out:

No.	Pos.	Nation	Player
6	MF	ISL	Victor Pálsson (to (Germany) SV Darmstadt 98)
20	MF	SUI	Maren Haile-Selassie (on loan to Rapperswil-Jona)
29	MF	SEN	Sangoné Sarr (on loan to Rapperswil-Jona)
44	DF	SUI	Albin Sadrijaj (on loan to Kriens)
68	FW	SUI	Roberto Rodríguez (to (Germany) KFC Uerdingen 05)
77	MF	SUI	Lavdrim Rexhepi (on loan to Rapperswil-Jona)
