= 2022–23 KVC Westerlo season =

K.V.C. Westerlo
2022–23 season
- Chairman: Oktay Ercan
- Manager: Jonas De Roeck
- Stadium: Het Kuipje
- Belgian Pro League: 7th
- Belgian Cup: Sixth round
- Top goalscorer: League: Maxim De Cuyper; Dorgeles Nene; Lyle Foster (8); All: Maxim De Cuyper; Dorgeles Nene; Lyle Foster (8)
- Biggest win: Westerlo 6–0 Oostende
- Biggest defeat: Genk 6–1 Westerlo
Home colours	Away colours	Third colours
- All statistics correct as of 22 April 2023.

The 2022–23 K.V.C. Westerlo season was the club's 90th season in existence and the first season in the top flight of Belgian football. In addition to the domestic league, Westerlo participated in this season's edition of the Belgian Cup. The season covers the period from 1 July 2022 to 30 June 2023.

== Players ==
=== First-team squad ===
As of 3 February 2023

Note: Flags indicate national team as defined under FIFA eligibility rules; some limited exceptions apply. Players may hold more than one non-FIFA nationality.

No.	Pos.	Nation	Player
1	GK	TUR	Sinan Bolat
2	DF	BEL	Pietro Perdichizzi
3	MF	USA	Griffin Yow
4	MF	BEL	Mathias Fixelles
5	MF	BEL	Nacer Chadli (on loan from İstanbul Başakşehir)
6	MF	BRA	Lucas Mineiro (on loan from Braga)
7	MF	BEL	Lukas Van Eenoo
8	MF	DEN	Nicolas Madsen
10	MF	SVK	Ján Bernát
11	DF	BEL	Maxim De Cuyper (on loan from Club Brugge)
14	FW	BEL	Kyan Vaesen
17	MF	TUR	Muhammed Gümüşkaya
18	DF	CIV	Kouya Mabea

No.	Pos.	Nation	Player
20	GK	BEL	Nick Gillekens
21	FW	MKD	Erdon Daci
22	DF	USA	Bryan Reynolds (on loan from Roma)
23	DF	BEL	Rubin Seigers
24	DF	TUR	Ravil Tagir (on loan from İstanbul Başakşehir)
25	FW	ANG	Igor Vetokele
30	GK	BEL	Koen Van Langendonck
32	DF	BUL	Edisson Jordanov
33	DF	RUS	Roman Neustädter
39	MF	BEL	Thomas Van den Keybus (on loan from Club Brugge)
45	MF	MLI	Dorgeles Nene (on loan from Red Bull Salzburg)
55	MF	BEL	Tuur Dierckx
—	MF	JPN	Yusuke Matsuo (on loan from Urawa Reds)

=== Out on loan ===
Note: Flags indicate national team as defined under FIFA eligibility rules; some limited exceptions apply. Players may hold more than one non-FIFA nationality.

No.	Pos.	Nation	Player
—	DF	SUI	Léo Seydoux (on loan at Beerschot until 30 June 2023)
—	MF	GUI	Sékou Camara (on loan at Bandırmaspor until 30 June 2023)
—	MF	TUR	Oğuz Kağan Güçtekin (on loan at Bandirmaspor until 30 June 2023)

No.	Pos.	Nation	Player
—	MF	BEL	Joeri Dequevy (on loan at Houtvenne until 30 June 2023)
—	MF	BEL	Simon Paulet (on loan at Virton until 30 June 2023)
—	FW	CIV	Fernand Gouré (on loan at Újpest until 30 June 2023)

=== Other players under contract ===
Note: Flags indicate national team as defined under FIFA eligibility rules; some limited exceptions apply. Players may hold more than one non-FIFA nationality.

No.	Pos.	Nation	Player
—	MF	MLI	Mamoutou N'Diaye

== Pre-season and friendlies ==
Win Draw Loss Fixtures

== Competitions ==
=== Overview ===
Competition	First match	Last match	Starting round	Final position	Record							
Competition	First match	Last match	Starting round	Final position	Pld	W	D	L	GF	GA	GD	Win %
Belgian Pro League	24 July 2022	May 2023	Matchday 1	7th	34	14	9	11	61	53	+8	41.18
Belgian Cup	25 September 2022	9 November 2022	Fifth round	Sixth round	2	1	0	1	3	2	+1	50.00
Total					36	15	9	12	64	55	+9	41.67

Source: Soccerway

=== Belgian Pro League ===
==== League table ====
Pos	Team	Pld	W	D	L	GF	GA	GD	Pts	Qualification or relegation
5	Gent (U)	34	16	8	10	64	38	+26	56	Qualification for the Play-offs II
6	Standard Liège	34	16	7	11	58	45	+13	55	Qualification for the Play-offs II
7	Westerlo	34	14	9	11	61	53	+8	51	Qualification for the Play-offs II
8	Cercle Brugge	34	13	11	10	50	46	+4	50	Qualification for the Play-offs II
9	Charleroi	34	14	6	14	45	52	−7	48	

Source: Jupiler Pro League (in Dutch), Soccerway
Rules for classification: 1) Points; 2) Matches won; 3) Goal difference; 4) Goals scored; 5) Away matches won; 6) Away goal difference; 7) Away goals scored; 8) Play-off.
(U) Play-off II winner

==== Results summary ====
Overall								Home						Away					
Pld	W	D	L	GF	GA	GD	Pts	W	D	L	GF	GA	GD	W	D	L	GF	GA	GD
34	14	9	11	61	53	+8	51	8	4	5	40	26	+14	6	5	6	21	27	−6

Last updated: 22 April 2023.
Source: Jupiler Pro League

==== Results by round ====
Round	1	2	3	4	5	6	7	8	9	10	11	12	13	14	15	16	17	18	19	20	21	22	23	24	25	26	27	28	29	30	31	32	33	34
Ground	H	A	A	H	A	H	A	H	A	H	A	H	A	A	H	A	H	H	A	H	H	A	H	A	H	A	H	A	H	A	H	A	H	A
Result	W	L	L	W	L	L	L	W	W	W	W	D	L	W	L	D	W	D	W	L	L	D	W	D	D	W	W	L	W	W	L	D	D	D
Position	4	9	14	7	10	12	13	12	11	7	7	8	8	7	7	7	6	7	7	7	8	7	7	7	7	7	6	7	6	6	7	7	7	7

Updated to match(es) played on 22 April 2023. Source: Jupiler Pro League
A = Away; H = Home; W = Win; D = Draw; L = Loss

==== Matches ====
The league fixtures were announced on 22 June 2022.

24 July 2022 1	Westerlo	2–0	Cercle Brugge	Westerlo
				Stadium: Het Kuipje

30 July 2022 2	OH Leuven	2–0	Westerlo	Leuven

7 August 2022 3	Gent	2–1	Westerlo	Ghent

13 August 2022 4	Westerlo	4–2	Standard Liège	Westerlo
				Stadium: Het Kuipje

21 August 2022 5	Mechelen	5–4	Westerlo	Mechelen

28 August 2022 6	Westerlo	0–1	Eupen	Westerlo
				Stadium: Het Kuipje

4 September 2022 7	Antwerp	3–0	Westerlo	Antwerp

11 September 2022 8	Westerlo	2–1	Anderlecht	Westerlo
				Stadium: Het Kuipje

17 September 2022 9	Charleroi	2–3	Westerlo	Charleroi

1 October 2022 10	Westerlo	2–0	Zulte Waregem	Westerlo
				Stadium: Het Kuipje

8 October 2022 11	Club Brugge	0–2	Westerlo	Bruges

14 October 2022 12	Westerlo	2–2	Seraing	Westerlo
				Stadium: Het Kuipje

18 October 2022 13	Genk	6–1	Westerlo	Genk

22 October 2022 14	Kortrijk	0–2	Westerlo	Kortrijk

29 October 2022 15	Westerlo	2–3	Sint-Truiden	Westerlo
				Stadium: Het Kuipje

6 November 2022 16	Union Saint-Gilloise	1–1	Westerlo	Brussels
16:00	Nilsson 90+2'	Report	Foster 45'	Stadium: Stade Joseph Mariën; Referee: Bram Van Driessche

12 November 2022 17	Westerlo	6–0	Oostende	Westerlo
16:00	Nene 16'; Dierckx 28'; Chadli 40' (pen.); Foster 49', 53'; Akbunar 81'	Report		Stadium: Het Kuipje; Referee: Nicolas Laforge

27 December 2022 18	Westerlo	3–3	Antwerp	Westerlo
				Stadium: Het Kuipje

7 January 2023 19	Cercle Brugge	0–1	Westerlo	Bruges

13 January 2023 20	Westerlo	1–2	OH Leuven	Westerlo
				Stadium: Het Kuipje

17 January 2023 21	Westerlo	2–3	Genk	Westerlo
				Stadium: Het Kuipje

21 January 2023 22	Zulte Waregem	1–1	Westerlo	Waregem

28 January 2023 23	Westerlo	2–0	Mechelen	Westerlo
				Stadium: Het Kuipje

4 February 2023 24	Eupen	1–1	Westerlo	Eupen

11 February 2023 25	Westerlo	3–3	Gent	Westerlo
				Stadium: Het Kuipje

19 February 2023 26	Sint-Truiden	0–1	Westerlo	Sint-Truiden

25 February 2023 27	Westerlo	4–2	Union Saint-Gilloise	Westerlo
				Stadium: Het Kuipje

4 March 2023 28	Standard Liège	2–0	Westerlo	Liège

11 March 2023 29	Westerlo	3–1	Kortrijk	Westerlo
				Stadium: Het Kuipje

18 March 2023 30	Oostende	1–2	Westerlo	Ostend

1 April 2023 31	Westerlo	2–3	Charleroi	Westerlo
				Stadium: Het Kuipje

9 April 2023 32	Anderlecht	0–0	Westerlo	Anderlecht

15 April 2023 33	Westerlo	0–0	Club Brugge	Westerlo
				Stadium: Het Kuipje

22 April 2023 34	Seraing	1–1	Westerlo	Seraing

==== Play-Off II ====
Pos	Team	Pld	W	D	L	GF	GA	GD	Pts	Qualification or relegation	GNT	CER	STA	WES
1	Gent (F)	6	5	1	0	17	6	+11	44	Qualification for the Europa Conference League second qualifying round	—	2–2	3–1	3–1
2	Cercle Brugge	6	3	2	1	13	9	+4	36		0–4	—	0–0	2–0
3	Standard Liège	6	0	2	4	4	14	−10	30 (Note: Tied on Points and Points without half points added due to rounding. Regular Season finishing position: Standard Liège 6, Westerlo 7)		1–2	0–4	—	2–2
4	Westerlo	6	1	1	4	10	15	−5	30		1–3	3–5	3–0	—

Source: Jupiler Pro League (in Dutch), Soccerway
Legend: Blue = home team win; Yellow = draw; Red = away team win.
Rules for classification: 1) Points; 2) Points without (possible) half points added due to rounding; 3) Regular season finishing position.
(F) Play-off II winner
