= Lucas Mineiro (footballer, born 1996) =

Brazilian footballer

Personal information
- Full name: Lucas da Silva Izidoro
- Date of birth: 24 February 1996 (age 30)
- Place of birth: Belo Horizonte, Brazil
- Height: 1.88 m (6 ft 2 in)
- Position: Midfielder

Team information
- Current team: Juventude (on loan from Cuiabá)
- Number: 8

Youth career
- Villa Nova
- 2015–2016: Chapecoense

Senior career*
Years	Team	Apps	(Gls)
2015	Villa Nova	6	(0)
2016–2021	Chapecoense	28	(0)
2018	→ Ponte Preta (loan)	24	(2)
2019	→ Vasco da Gama (loan)	27	(2)
2019	→ Ponte Preta (loan)	13	(1)
2020	→ Cerezo Osaka (loan)	3	(0)
2020–2021	→ Gil Vicente (loan)	33	(2)
2021–2024	Braga	19	(0)
2022–2023	→ Westerlo (loan)	9	(0)
2023	→ Cuiabá (loan)	16	(0)
2024–	Cuiabá	78	(3)
2026–	→ Juventude (loan)	35	(0)
- * Club domestic league appearances and goals as of 17 November 2026

Lucas da Silva Izidoro (born 24 February 1996), known as Lucas Mineiro, is a Brazilian footballer who plays as a midfielder for Juventude, on loan from Série A club Cuiabá.

== Club career ==
Born in Belo Horizonte, Minas Gerais, Lucas started his career at Villa Nova (being also known as Dodô), and made his senior debut on 8 March 2015 by coming on as a second half substitute in a 0–0 Campeonato Mineiro home draw against América Mineiro. In August, after two Série D appearances, he joined Chapecoense, returning to youth setup.

Lucas made his Série A debut on 11 June 2016, replacing Dener in a 1–2 away loss against Ponte Preta. He did not board LaMia Airlines Flight 2933 for the 2016 Copa Sudamericana Finals, which crashed and killed 19 of his teammates.

== Career statistics ==
As of 7 December 2023

Appearances and goals by club, season and competition
Club	Season	League			State league		Cup		Continental		Other		Total	
Club	Season	Division	Apps	Goals	Apps	Goals	Apps	Goals	Apps	Goals	Apps	Goals	Apps	Goals
Villa Nova	2015	Série D	2	0	4	0	1	0	—		—		7	0
Chapecoense	2016	Série A	2	0	1	0	0	0	0	0	—		3	0
Chapecoense	2017	Série A	19	0	0	0	0	0	4 (Note: Appearance(s) in Copa Sudamericana)	0	1 (Note: Appearance(s) in Primeira Liga (Brazil))	0	24	0
Chapecoense	2018	Série A	0	0	6	0	0	0	1 (Note: Appearance(s) in Copa Libertadores)	0	—		7	0
Chapecoense	Total		21	0	7	0	0	0	5	0	1	0	34	0
Ponte Preta (loan)	2018	Série B	19	1	5	1	5	0	—		—		29	2
Vasco da Gama (loan)	2019	Série A	11	0	16	2	6	1	—		—		33	3
Gamba Osaka (loan)	2020	J1 League	3	0	—		0	0	—		2 (Note: Appearance(s) in J.League Cup)	0	5	0
Gil Vicente (loan)	2020–21	Primeira Liga	33	2	—		4	0	—		0	0	37	2
Braga	2021–22	Primeira Liga	19	2	—		3	0	9 (Note: Appearance(s) in UEFA Europa League)	0	2 (Note: Appearance(s) in Taça da Liga)	0	33	2
Westerlo (loan)	2022–23	Belgian Pro League	9	0	—		1	0	—		—		10	0
Cuiabá (loan)	2023	Série A	16	0	—		0	0	—		—		16	0
Cuiabá	2024	Série A	0	0	0	0	0	0	—		—		0	0
Career total			133	5	32	3	20	1	14	0	5	0	205	9

== Honours ==
Chapecoense

- Campeonato Catarinense: 2016, 2017
