= Léo Seydoux =

Swiss footballer (born 1998)

Personal information
- Full name: Léo Louis Seydoux
- Date of birth: 16 March 1998 (age 28)
- Place of birth: Riaz, Switzerland
- Height: 1.74 m (5 ft 9 in)
- Position: Right-back

Team information
- Current team: Neuchâtel Xamax
- Number: 16

Youth career
- 2007–2009: FC Remaufens
- 2009–2010: Bulle
- 2010–2013: Fribourg
- 2013–2018: Young Boys

Senior career*
Years	Team	Apps	(Gls)
2018–2021	Young Boys	3	(0)
2019–2020	→ Neuchâtel Xamax (loan)	35	(0)
2021–2024	Westerlo	27	(2)
2022–2023	→ Beerschot (loan)	32	(1)
2024–2025	Dordrecht	47	(2)
2025–	Neuchâtel Xamax	41	(1)

International career^{‡}
2015	Switzerland U17	4	(0)
2015–2016	Switzerland U18	6	(0)
2016	Switzerland U19	4	(0)
2017–2018	Switzerland U20	2	(0)
2019	Switzerland U21	3	(0)
- * Club domestic league appearances and goals as of 28 September 2026 ‡ National team caps and goals as of 15 October 2019

Léo Louis Seydoux (born 16 March 1998) is a Swiss professional footballer who plays as a right-back for Neuchâtel Xamax in the Swiss Challenge League.

== Club career ==
Seydoux made his professional debut with Young Boys in a 2–0 Swiss Super League win over St. Gallen on 26 September 2018.

On 9 January 2021, he signed a 3.5-year contract with Westerlo in Belgium. On 30 July 2022, Seydoux moved on loan to Beerschot, with an option to buy.

On 5 January 2024, Seydoux joined Dordrecht in the Netherlands on a 2.5-year contract.

== Career statistics ==
As of match played 29 January 2024

Appearances and goals by club, season and competition
Club	Season	League			National Cup		Other		Total	
Club	Season	Division	Apps	Goals	Apps	Goals	Apps	Goals	Apps	Goals
Young Boys	2017-18	Swiss Super League	0	0	0	0	0	0	0	0
Young Boys	2018-19	Swiss Super League	3	0	0	0	0	0	3	0
Young Boys	2019-20	Swiss Super League	0	0	0	0	0	0	0	0
Young Boys	2020-21	Swiss Super League	0	0	0	0	0	0	0	0
Young Boys	Total		3	0	0	0	0	0	0	0
Neuchâtel Xamax (loan)	2019-20	Swiss Super League	35	0	2	0	0	0	37	0
Westerlo	2020-21	Challenger Pro League	12	0	1	0	0	0	13	0
Westerlo	2021-22	Challenger Pro League	15	2	1	0	0	0	16	2
Westerlo	2022-23	Belgian Pro League	0	0	0	0	0	0	0	0
Westerlo	Total		27	2	2	0	0	0	29	2
Beerschot (loan)	2022-23	Challenger Pro League	32	1	2	0	0	0	34	1
Dordrecht	2023-24	Eerste Divisie	2	0	0	0	0	0	2	0
Career total			99	3	6	0	0	0	105	3

== Honours ==
Young Boys

- Swiss Super League: 2018–19

Westerlo

- Belgian First Division B: 2021–22
