= 2018–19 BSC Young Boys season =

BSC Young Boys
2018–19 season
- Chairman: Werner Müller
- Manager: Gerardo Seoane
- Stadium: Stade de Suisse
- Swiss Super League: 1st
- Swiss Cup: Quarter-finals
- UEFA Champions League: Group stage
Home colours	Away colours

The 2018–19 season was the 94th in the history of BSC Young Boys and their 23rd consecutive season in the top flight. The club participated in the Swiss Super League, the Swiss Cup, and the UEFA Champions League. The season covered the period from 1 July 2018 to 30 June 2019.

== Players ==
As of 3 January 2019

Note: Flags indicate national team as defined under FIFA eligibility rules; some limited exceptions apply. Players may hold more than one non-FIFA nationality.

No.	Pos.	Nation	Player
1	GK	SUI	Marco Wölfli
4	DF	GUI	Mohamed Ali Camara
5	DF	SUI	Steve von Bergen (Captain)
7	MF	SRB	Miralem Sulejmani
8	MF	SUI	Djibril Sow
11	MF	GER	Gianluca Gaudino
13	FW	CMR	Moumi Ngamaleu
16	FW	SUI	Christian Fassnacht
17	FW	CIV	Roger Assalé
18	FW	CMR	Jean-Pierre Nsame
19	MF	AUT	Thorsten Schick
20	MF	SUI	Michel Aebischer

No.	Pos.	Nation	Player
21	DF	SUI	Ulisses Garcia
22	DF	SUI	Gregory Wüthrich
23	DF	SUI	Loris Benito
26	GK	SUI	David von Ballmoos
29	DF	SUI	Jordan Lotomba
30	MF	SUI	Sandro Lauper
39	MF	SUI	Léo Seydoux
40	GK	SUI	Dario Marzino
43	DF	SUI	Kevin Mbabu
51	DF	SUI	Jan Kronig
99	FW	FRA	Guillaume Hoarau

=== Out on loan ===
Note: Flags indicate national team as defined under FIFA eligibility rules; some limited exceptions apply. Players may hold more than one non-FIFA nationality.

No.	Pos.	Nation	Player
27	MF	SUI	Pedro Teixeira (on loan with FC Rapperswil-Jona)
77	FW	ALB	Taulant Seferi (on loan with FC Wohlen)

No.	Pos.	Nation	Player

== Pre-season and friendlies ==
Win Draw Loss

27 June 2018 Friendly	Rheindorf Altach (Austria)	2–3	(Switzerland) Young Boys	Nenzing, Austria
18:00 CEST (UTC+2)				Stadium: Sportplatz Nenzing

30 June 2018 Friendly	Young Boys (Switzerland)	1–2	(Bulgaria) Ludogorets Razgrad	Fügen, Austria
17:30 CEST (UTC+2)				Stadium: Sportplatz Fügen

11 July 2018 Friendly	Young Boys (Switzerland)	3–0	(Netherlands) Feyenoord	Biel/Bienne
18:00 CEST (UTC+2)				Stadium: Tissot Arena

14 July 2018 Friendly	Young Boys (Switzerland)	0–4	(England) Wolverhampton Wanderers	Bern
15:00 CEST (UTC+2)			Cavaleiro 26'; Costa 30'; Bonatini 54'; Mir 89'	Stadium: Stadion Neufeld; Attendance: 3,467

12 January 2019 Friendly	VfL Osnabrück (Germany)	2–1	(Switzerland) Young Boys	Aksu, Turkey
15:00 TRT (UTC+3)				Stadium: Topkapı Spor Kompleksi - artificial

15 January 2019 Friendly	Young Boys (Switzerland)	1–1	(Romania) Astra Giurgiu	Aksu, Turkey
15:00 TRT (UTC+3)				Stadium: Topkapı Spor Kompleksi - grass

23 January 2019 Friendly	Young Boys (Switzerland)	3–1	(Switzerland) Schaffhausen	Bern
16:00 CET (UTC+1)				Stadium: Stade de Suisse

26 January 2019 Friendly	Young Boys (Switzerland)	4–2	(Switzerland) Wil	Bern
13:00 CET (UTC+1)				Stadium: Stade de Suisse

26 January 2019 Friendly	Young Boys (Switzerland)	2–2	(Switzerland) Lausanne	Bern
16:00 CET (UTC+1)				Stadium: Stade de Suisse

== Competitions ==
=== Overall record ===
Competition	First match	Last match	Starting round	Final position	Record							
Competition	First match	Last match	Starting round	Final position	Pld	W	D	L	GF	GA	GD	Win %
Swiss Super League	22 July 2018	25 May 2019	Matchday 1	Winners	36	29	4	3	99	36	+63	80.56
Swiss Cup	18 August 2018	6 March 2019	Round 1	Quarter-finals	4	3	0	1	7	8	−1	75.00
UEFA Champions League	22 August 2018	12 December 2018	Play-off round	Group stage	8	2	2	4	7	14	−7	25.00
Total					48	34	6	8	113	58	+55	70.83

Source: Soccerway

=== Swiss Super League ===
==== League table ====
Pos	Team	Pld	W	D	L	GF	GA	GD	Pts	Qualification or relegation
1	Young Boys (C)	36	29	4	3	99	36	+63	91	Qualification for the Champions League play-off round
2	Basel	36	20	11	5	71	46	+25	71	Qualification for the Champions League second qualifying round
3	Lugano	36	10	16	10	50	49	+1	46	Qualification for the Europa League group stage
4	Thun	36	12	10	14	57	58	−1	46	Qualification for the Europa League third qualifying round
5	Luzern	36	14	4	18	56	61	−5	46	Qualification for the Europa League second qualifying round

Source: Swiss Super League
Rules for classification: 1) Points; 2) Goal difference; 3) Goals scored; 4) Head-to-head goal difference; 5) Away goals scored; 6) Draw.
(C) Champions

==== Results summary ====
Overall								Home						Away					
Pld	W	D	L	GF	GA	GD	Pts	W	D	L	GF	GA	GD	W	D	L	GF	GA	GD
0	0	0	0	0	0	0	0	0	0	0	0	0	0	0	0	0	0	0	0

Source: Swiss Super League

==== Results by round ====
Round	1	2	3	4	5	6	7	8	9	10	11	12	13	14	15	16	17	18	19	20	21	22	23	24	25	26	27	28	29	30	31	32	33	34	35	36
Ground	H	A	H	A	H	A	H	H	A	H	A	H	A	A	H	A	H	A	H	A	H	A	H	A	A	H	A	H	A	A	H	A	H	H	A	H
Result	W	W	W	W	W	W	W	W	W	L	D	W	W	W	W	W	W	W	W	D	W	W	W	W	D	W	W	W	W	L	D	W	W	W	L	W
Position																																				

Source: Swiss Super League
A = Away; H = Home; W = Win; D = Draw; L = Loss

==== Matches ====
22 July 2018 1	Young Boys	2–0	Grasshopper	Bern
CEST (UTC+2)				Stadium: Stade de Suisse

29 July 2018 2	Lugano	0–2	Young Boys	Lugano
CEST (UTC+2)				Stadium: Stadio Cornaredo

5 August 2018 3	Young Boys	4–0	Zürich	Bern
CEST (UTC+2)				Stadium: Stade de Suisse

12 August 2018 4	Luzern	2–3	Young Boys	Lucerne
CEST (UTC+2)				Stadium: Swissporarena

25 August 2018 5	Young Boys	5–2	Neuchâtel Xamax	Bern
CEST (UTC+2)				Stadium: Stade de Suisse

1 September 2018 6	Sion	0–3	Young Boys	Sion
CEST (UTC+2)				Stadium: Stade Tourbillon

23 September 2018 7	Young Boys	7–1	Basel	Bern
CEST (UTC+2)				Stadium: Stade de Suisse

26 September 2018 8	Young Boys	2–0	St. Gallen	Bern
CEST (UTC+2)				Stadium: Stade de Suisse

29 September 2018 9	Thun	1–4	Young Boys	Thun
CEST (UTC+2)				Stadium: Stockhorn Arena

6 October 2018 10	Young Boys	2–3	Luzern	Bern
CEST (UTC+2)				Stadium: Stade de Suisse

20 October 2018 11	Zürich	3–3	Young Boys	Zürich
CEST (UTC+2)				Stadium: Letzigrund

27 October 2018 12	Young Boys	3–2	Sion	Bern
CEST (UTC+2)				Stadium: Stade de Suisse

3 November 2018 13	Grasshopper	0–3	Young Boys	Zürich
CET (UTC+1)				Stadium: Letzigrund

11 November 2018 14	St. Gallen	2–3	Young Boys	St. Gallen
CET (UTC+1)				Stadium: kybunpark

24 November 2018 15	Young Boys	1–0	Lugano	Bern
CET (UTC+1)				Stadium: Stade de Suisse

2 December 2018 16	Basel	1–3	Young Boys	Basel
CET (UTC+1)				Stadium: St. Jakob-Park

8 December 2018 17	Young Boys	3–2	Thun	Bern
CET (UTC+1)				Stadium: Stade de Suisse

16 December 2018 18	Neuchâtel Xamax	1–4	Young Boys	Neuchâtel
CET (UTC+1)				Stadium: Stade de la Maladière

2 February 2019 19	Young Boys	2–0	Neuchâtel Xamax	Bern
CET (UTC+1)				Stadium: Stade de Suisse

10 February 2019 20	Thun	1–1	Young Boys	Thun
CET (UTC+1)				Stadium: Stockhorn Arena

17 February 2019 21	Young Boys	2–0	Zürich	Bern
CET (UTC+1)				Stadium: Stade de Suisse

24 February 2019 22	Lugano	0–1	Young Boys	Lugano
CET (UTC+1)				Stadium: Stadio Cornaredo

2 March 2019 23	Young Boys	1–0	Sion	Bern
CET (UTC+1)				Stadium: Stade de Suisse

9 March 2019 24	Grasshopper	0–1	Young Boys	Zürich
CET (UTC+1)				Stadium: Letzigrund

17 March 2019 25	Basel	2–2	Young Boys	Basel
CET (UTC+1)				Stadium: St. Jakob-Park

31 March 2019 26	Young Boys	3–2	St. Gallen	Bern
CEST (UTC+2)				Stadium: Stade de Suisse

7 April 2019 28	Young Boys	5–1	Thun	Bern
CEST (UTC+2)				Stadium: Stade de Suisse

10 April 2019 27	Luzern	1–3	Young Boys	Lucerne
CEST (UTC+2)				Stadium: Swissporarena

14 April 2019 29	Zürich	0–1	Young Boys	Zürich
CEST (UTC+2)				Stadium: Letzigrund

22 April 2019 30	Neuchâtel Xamax	1–0	Young Boys	Neuchâtel
CEST (UTC+2)				Stadium: Stade de la Maladière

28 April 2019 31	Young Boys	2–2	Lugano	Bern
CEST (UTC+2)				Stadium: Stade de Suisse

5 May 2019 32	Sion	0–4	Young Boys	Sion
CEST (UTC+2)				Stadium: Stade Tourbillon

12 May 2019 33	Young Boys	3–1	Basel	Bern
CEST (UTC+2)				Stadium: Stade de Suisse

16 May 2019 34	Young Boys	6–1	Grasshopper	Bern
CEST (UTC+2)				Stadium: Stade de Suisse

22 May 2019 35	St. Gallen	4–1	Young Boys	St. Gallen
CEST (UTC+2)				Stadium: kybunpark

25 May 2019 36	Young Boys	4–0	Luzern	Bern
CEST (UTC+2)				Stadium: Stade de Suisse

=== Swiss Cup ===
18 August 2018 Round 1	Biel-Bienne	2–3 (a.e.t.)	Young Boys	Biel/Bienne
CEST (UTC+2)				Stadium: Tissot Arena

15 September 2018 Round 2	Schaffhausen	2–3 (a.e.t.)	Young Boys	Schaffhausen
CEST (UTC+2)				Stadium: Wefox Arena Schaffhausen

31 October 2018 Round 3	Stade Nyonnais	0–1	Young Boys	Nyon
CET (UTC+1)				Stadium: Colovray Sports Centre

6 March 2019 Quarter-finals	Luzern	4–0	Young Boys	Lucerne
CET (UTC+1)				Stadium: Swissporarena

=== UEFA Champions League ===
==== Play-off round ====
22 August 2018 First leg	Young Boys (Switzerland)	1–1	(Croatia) Dinamo Zagreb	Bern
21:00 CEST (UTC+2)	Mbabu 2'	Report	Oršić 40'	Stadium: Stade de Suisse; Attendance: 21,463; Referee: Alberto Undiano Mallenco (Spain)

28 August 2018 Second leg	Dinamo Zagreb (Croatia)	1–2 (2–3 agg.)	(Switzerland) Young Boys	Zagreb
21:00 CEST (UTC+2)	Hajrović 7'	Report	Hoarau 64' (pen.), 66'	Stadium: Stadion Maksimir; Attendance: 28,137; Referee: Björn Kuipers (Netherlands)

==== Group stage ====
Pos	Team	Pld	W	D	L	GF	GA	GD	Pts	Qualification	JUV	MUN	VAL	YB
1	(Italy) Juventus	6	4	0	2	9	4	+5	12	Advance to knockout phase	—	1–2	1–0	3–0
2	(England) Manchester United	6	3	1	2	7	4	+3	10	Advance to knockout phase	0–1	—	0–0	1–0
3	(Spain) Valencia	6	2	2	2	6	6	0	8	Transfer to Europa League	0–2	2–1	—	3–1
4	(Switzerland) Young Boys	6	1	1	4	4	12	−8	4		2–1	0–3	1–1	—

Source: UEFA
Rules for classification: Group stage tiebreakers

19 September 2018 1	Young Boys (Switzerland)	0–3	(England) Manchester United	Stade de Suisse, Bern
21:00		Report	Pogba 35', 44' (pen.); Martial 66'	Attendance: 31,120; Referee: Deniz Aytekin (Germany)

2 October 2018 2	Juventus (Italy)	3–0	(Switzerland) Young Boys	Juventus Stadium, Turin
18:55	Dybala 5', 33', 69'	Report		Attendance: 40,961; Referee: Sergei Karasev (Russia)

23 October 2018 3	Young Boys (Switzerland)	1–1	(Spain) Valencia	Stade de Suisse, Bern
18:55	Hoarau 55' (pen.)	Report	Batshuayi 26'	Attendance: 31,120; Referee: Andris Treimanis (Latvia)

7 November 2018 4	Valencia (Spain)	3–1	(Switzerland) Young Boys	Mestalla, Valencia
18:55	Mina 14', 42'; Soler 56'	Report	Assalé 37'	Attendance: 36,480; Referee: István Kovács (Romania)

27 November 2018 5	Manchester United (England)	1–0	(Switzerland) Young Boys	Old Trafford, Manchester
21:00 (20:00 GMT)	Fellaini 90+1'	Report		Attendance: 72,876; Referee: Felix Brych (Germany)

12 December 2018 6	Young Boys (Switzerland)	2–1	(Italy) Juventus	Stade de Suisse, Bern
21:00	Hoarau 30' (pen.), 68'	Report	Dybala 80'	Attendance: 30,114; Referee: Tobias Stieler (Germany)
