= Loris Benito =

Swiss football player (born 1992)

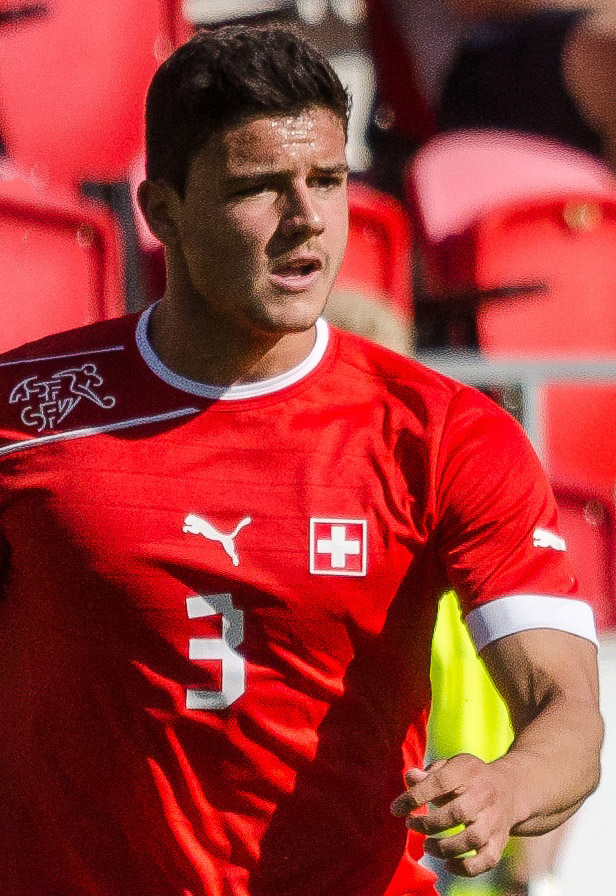
- Benito playing for Switzerland U21 in 2013

Personal information
- Full name: Loris Benito Souto
- Date of birth: 7 January 1992 (age 34)
- Place of birth: Aarau, Switzerland
- Height: 1.84 m (6 ft 0 in)
- Positions: Left-back; centre-back

Team information
- Current team: Young Boys
- Number: 23

Youth career
- 2000–2009: FC Aarau

Senior career*
Years	Team	Apps	(Gls)
2009–2012	FC Aarau	47	(2)
2012–2014	FC Zürich	58	(0)
2014–2015	Benfica	2	(0)
2015	Benfica B	3	(0)
2015–2019	Young Boys	71	(2)
2019–2021	Bordeaux	55	(1)
2022	Sion	13	(0)
2022–	Young Boys	103	(2)

International career^{‡}
2010–2011	Switzerland U19	12	(1)
2011–2012	Switzerland U20	6	(0)
2014	Switzerland U21	7	(0)
2018–	Switzerland	13	(1)
- * Club domestic league appearances and goals as of 19:04, 19 September 2026 (UTC) ‡ National team caps and goals as of 19:44, 4 June 2023 (UTC)

Loris Benito Souto (born 7 January 1992) is a Swiss professional footballer who plays as a left-back or centre-back for Young Boys and the Switzerland national team.

== Club career ==
Benito was born in Aarau, Switzerland. A product of local FC Aarau youth ranks, he made his professional debut on 1 November 2009 at age 17 under then-coach Martin Andermatt. His performances led to a move in 2012 to FC Zürich.

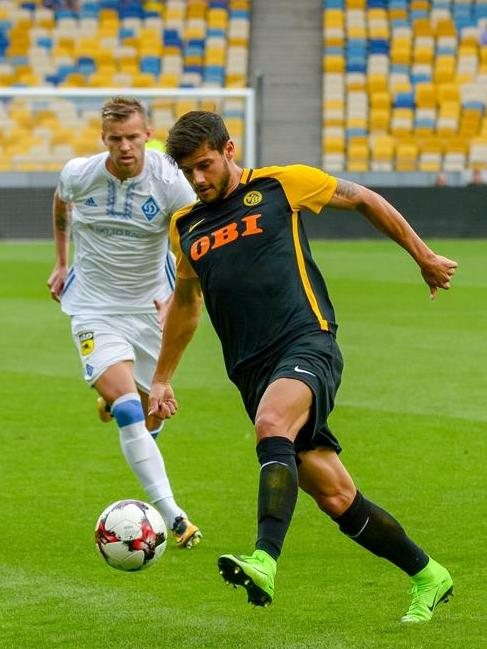
Benito playing for BSC Young Boys in 2017

On 10 March 2013, in an away match against FC Thun, Benito was bitten on the finger by a beech marten he had caught after it invaded the pitch.

After solid performances in the Swiss league, news started about a potential move abroad. On 22 June 2014, Benito signed a five-year deal with Portuguese champions Benfica for an unconfirmed fee of around €2.5 million.

On 18 October 2014, Benito made his debut for Benfica in a win at S.C. Covilhã (2–3) in the third round of Taça de Portugal. On 6 December 2014, he debuted in Primeira Liga in a home win (3–0) against Belenenses.

On 22 February 2015, Benito debuted for Benfica B against Oriental in Segunda Liga.

On 23 June 2015, he returned to Swiss football, signing a four-year contract with BSC Young Boys. His first two seasons back in Switzerland were spent mostly on the sidelines with injuries including a metatarsal fracture and torn ligaments in his knee.

He also played for French club FC Girondins de Bordeaux between 2019 and 2021.

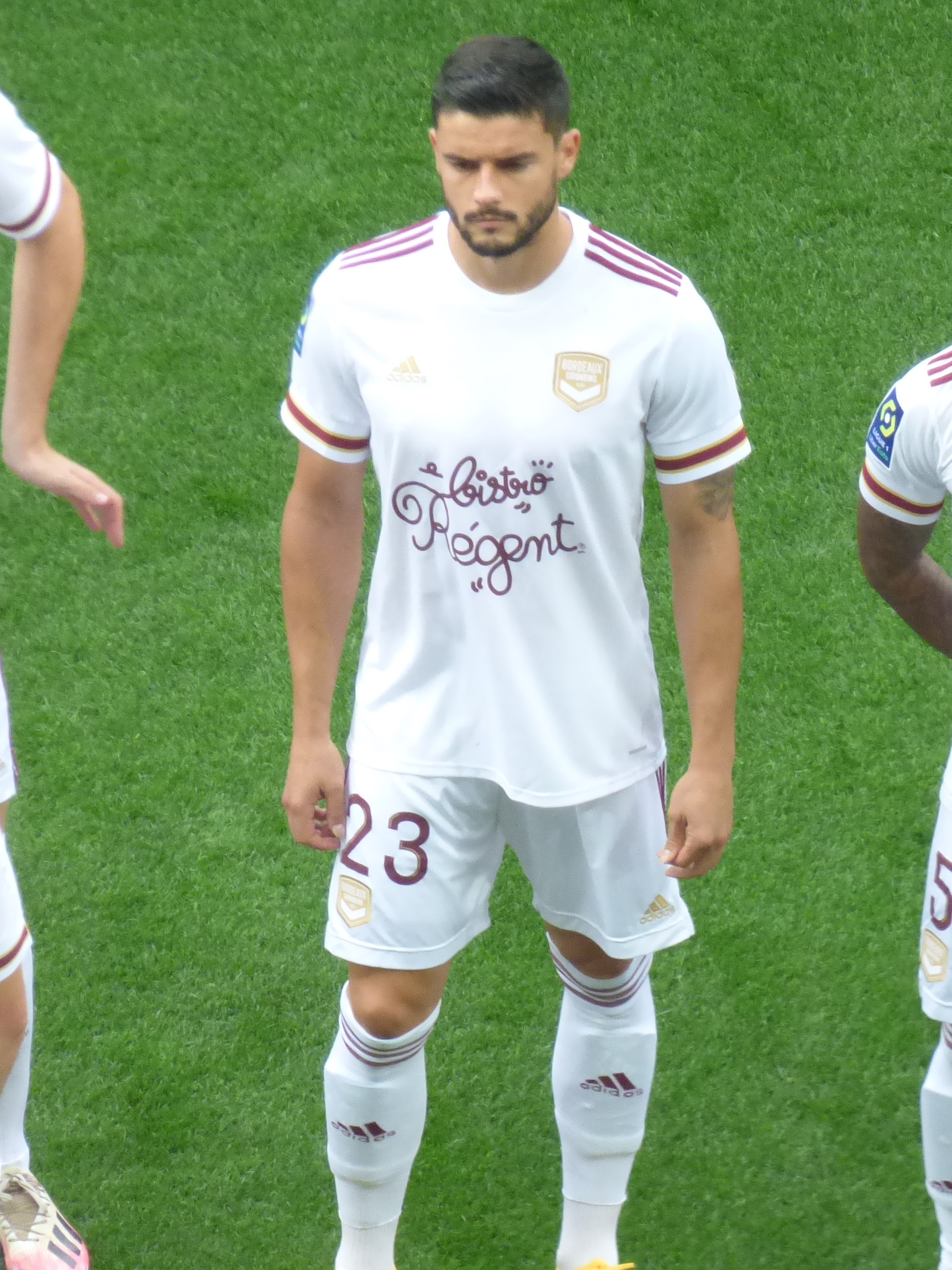
Benito with Bordeaux in 2020

On 30 January 2022, Benito signed a 1.5-year contract with Sion.

On 4 July 2022, he returned to Young Boys on a three-year contract. He scored a late own goal against Celtic on 22 January 2025, to put Celtic in the knockout stages of the UEFA Champions League.

== International career ==
In May 2019, Benito played in the 2019 UEFA Nations League Finals, where his team finished fourth.

In 2021, he was called up to the national team for the 2020 UEFA European Championship, where the team created one of the main sensations of the tournament reaching the quarter-finals.

== Personal life ==
He is the nephew of Ivan Benito. Of Galician descent, Benito is fluent in German, Italian, Spanish, English, Portuguese (Galician), and French.

== Career statistics ==
=== Club ===
As of match played 19 September 2026

Appearances and goals by club, season and competition
Club	Season	League			National cup (Note: Includes Swiss Cup, Coupe de France, Taça de Portugal)		League cup (Note: Includes Taça da Liga, Coupe de la Ligue)		Continental		Other		Total	
Club	Season	Division	Apps	Goals	Apps	Goals	Apps	Goals	Apps	Goals	Apps	Goals	Apps	Goals
Aarau	2009–10	Swiss Super League	7	0	0	0	—		—		—		7	0
Aarau	2010–11	Swiss Challenge League	26	0	2	0	—		—		—		28	0
Aarau	2011–12	Swiss Challenge League	13	2	2	0	—		—		—		15	2
Aarau	Total		46	2	4	0	—		—		—		50	2
Zürich	2011–12	Swiss Super League	2	0	0	0	—		0	0	—		2	0
Zürich	2012–13	Swiss Super League	28	0	2	1	—		0	0	—		30	1
Zürich	2013–14	Swiss Super League	28	0	2	0	—		2 (Note: Appearance(s) in UEFA Europa League)	0	—		32	0
Zürich	Total		58	0	4	1	—		2	0	0	0	64	1
Benfica	2014–15	Primeira Liga	2	0	2	0	1	0	1 (Note: Appearance(s) in UEFA Champions League)	0	0	0	6	0
Benfica B	2014–15	Liga Sabseg	3	0	—		—		—		—		3	0
Young Boys	2015–16	Swiss Super League	10	0	1	0	—		1	0	—		12	0
Young Boys	2016–17	Swiss Super League	7	0	0	0	—		2	0	—		9	0
Young Boys	2017–18	Swiss Super League	23	1	3	0	—		5 (Note: Four appearances in UEFA Champions League, one appearance in UEFA Europa League)	0	—		31	1
Young Boys	2018–19	Swiss Super League	31	1	3	0	—		8	0	—		42	1
Young Boys	2019–20	Swiss Super League	0	0	0	0	—		0	0	—		0	0
Young Boys	Total		71	2	7	0	—		16	0	—		94	2
Bordeaux	2019–20	Ligue 1	23	1	2	0	2	0	—		—		27	1
Bordeaux	2020–21	Ligue 1	31	0	0	0	—		—		—		31	0
Bordeaux	2021–22	Ligue 1	1	0	0	0	—		—		—		1	0
Bordeaux	Total		55	1	2	0	2	0	—		—		59	1
Sion	2021–22	Swiss Super League	13	0	0	0	—		—		—		13	0
Young Boys	2022–23	Swiss Super League	19	0	4	1	—		4 (Note: Appearance(s) in UEFA Europa Conference League)	0	—		27	1
Young Boys	2023–24	Swiss Super League	16	2	2	0	—		7	0	—		25	2
Young Boys	2024–25	Swiss Super League	27	0	3	0	—		5	0	—		35	0
Young Boys	2025–26	Swiss Super League	32	0	2	0	—		9	0	—		43	0
Young Boys	2026–27	Swiss Super League	9	0	1	0	—		—		—		10	0
Young Boys	Total		103	2	12	1	—		24	0	—		140	3
Career total			350	7	31	2	7	0	43	0	0	0	429	9

=== International ===
As of match played 20 June 2021

Appearances and goals by national team and year
National team	Year	Apps	Goals
Switzerland	2018	2	0
Switzerland	2019	3	1
Switzerland	2020	5	0
Switzerland	2021	3	0
Total		13	1

Scores and results list Switzerland's goal tally first.

No.	Date	Venue	Opponent	Score	Result	Competition
1.	16 November 2019	Victoria Stadium, Gibraltar	Gibraltar	4–1	6–1	UEFA Euro 2020 qualification

== Honours ==
Benfica

- Primeira Liga: 2014–15
- Taça da Liga: 2014–15
- Supertaça Cândido de Oliveira: 2014

FC Zürich

- Swiss Cup: 2013–14

Young Boys

- Swiss Super League: 2017–18, 2018–19, 2022–23
- Swiss Cup: 2022–23

Individual

- Swiss Super League Team of the Year: 2018–19
