= Antoine Rey =

Swiss footballer (born 1986)

Personal information
- Full name: Antoine Rey
- Date of birth: 25 August 1986 (age 40)
- Place of birth: Switzerland
- Height: 1.67 m (5 ft 6 in)
- Position: Midfielder

Team information
- Current team: Mendrisio-Stabio

Senior career*
| Years | Team | Apps | (Gls) |
| 2002–2010 | Lausanne-Sport | 159 | (13) |
| 2010–2017 | Lugano | 207 | (6) |
| 2017–2018 | Chiasso | 37 | (1) |
| 2019– | Mendrisio-Stabio | ? | (?) |
- * Club domestic league appearances and goals as of 26 January 2019

Antoine Rey (born 25 August 1986) is a Swiss professional football player who plays as a midfielder for Mendrisio-Stabio.

== Career ==
He started his career at FC Lausanne-Sport when he was 16 years old and earned 172 senior appearances for the club before moving to FC Lugano. He reached 200 official appearances with FC Lugano on 29 May 2016 playing the 2015-16 Swiss Cup Final.

Rey signed with Mendrisio-Stabio in January 2019.

== Personal life ==
He is a graduate of University of Lausanne where he earned his bachelor's degree in Biology. He earned his master's degree in Economics from Università della Svizzera Italiana.

== Honours ==
Lugano

Winner

- Swiss Challenge League: 2014–15

Runner-up

- Swiss Challenge League: 2013–14
