= Novem Baumann =

Swiss footballer (born 1995)

Personal information
- Full name: Novem Baumann
- Date of birth: 4 December 1995 (age 30)
- Place of birth: Zürich, Switzerland
- Height: 1.85 m (6 ft 1 in)
- Position: Goalkeeper

Team information
- Current team: Young Fellows Juventus
- Number: 16

Youth career
- Urdorf
- Oetwil-Geroldswil
- 2006–2012: Zürich

Senior career*
Years	Team	Apps	(Gls)
2012–2021	Zürich	2	(0)
2013	→Höngg (loan)	2	(0)
2014–2015	→Wil (loan)	0	(0)
2017–2018	→Rapperswil-Jona (loan)	2	(0)
2021–	Young Fellows Juventus	40	(0)

International career^{‡}
2010–	Switzerland U-15	1	(0)
2010–2011	Switzerland U-16	7	(0)
2011–2012	Switzerland U-17	3	(0)
2012–2013	Switzerland U-18	4	(0)
2013–2015	Switzerland U-19	7	(0)
2015	Switzerland U-20	3	(0)
- * Club domestic league appearances and goals as of 02:35, 9 January 2023 (UTC) ‡ National team caps and goals as of 08:30, 13 July 2020 (UTC)

Novem Baumann (born 4 December 1995) is a Swiss professional goalkeeper who plays for 1. Liga Promotion club Young Fellows Juventus.

== Career ==
=== Youth ===
Baumann began his career in Switzerland with the youth teams of Urdorf and Oetwil-Geroldswil. In 2006, he joined the youth team of FC Zürich.

=== Zürich U21 ===
In December 2012, Baumann was promoted to the U21 team of FC Zürich.

==== Loan to Höngg ====
In 2013, Baumann was sent out on loan to SV Höngg. He made his debut for the club in a 2-1 win against FC Thalwil. After his 3-month loan spell, he returned to Zürich. He made a total of 2 appearances for the club.

==== Loan to Wil ====
In 2015, Baumann joined Swiss Challenge League club Wil in a 3-month loan deal. Baumann then returned to Zürich. He made 1 appearance for the U20 team.

=== Zürich seniors ===
In July 2015, Baumann was promoted to the senior team of Zürich. In 2016 he made his league debut for the club in a 0-2 defeat against his former club Wil.

==== Loan to Rapperswil-Jona ====
Baumann was sent on loan to Swiss Challenge League club Rapperswil-Jona. He made his debut for the club in a 2-0 away defeat against Wil. After his loan spell, he returned to Zürich, making a total of 4 appearances for Rapperswil-Jona.

==== Return to the senior team ====
Baumann was demoted to the U21 team in February 2019. After playing mostly for the U21 team, Baumann was once again promoted to the senior team replacing outgoing goalkeeper, Osman Hadžikić.

=== YF Juventus ===
In June 2021, Baumann's contract with Zürich expired. Baumann then joined 1. Liga Promotion club Young Fellows Juventus.

== International career ==
Born to a Swiss father and a Filipina mother, Baumann is eligible to represent both Switzerland and Philippines at international level.

=== Switzerland youth ===
Baumann has represented Switzerland at under-15 to under-20 levels.

== Honours ==
=== Club ===
==== Zürich ====
- Swiss Cup: 2015–16
