= Marco Schönbächler =

Swiss footballer (born 1990)

Personal information
- Date of birth: 11 January 1990 (age 36)
- Place of birth: Urdorf, Switzerland
- Height: 1.71 m (5 ft 7 in)
- Positions: Right midfielder; right-back

Youth career
- FC Urdorf
- FC Zürich

Senior career*
| Years | Team | Apps | (Gls) |
| 2006–2021 | FC Zürich | 292 | (41) |

International career^{‡}
| 2007–2009 | Switzerland U19 | 18 | (3) |
| 2009–2011 | Switzerland U21 | 4 | (0) |
| 2014– | Switzerland | 2 | (0) |
- * Club domestic league appearances and goals as of 13 June 2021 ‡ National team caps and goals as of 19 August 2014

Marco Schönbächler (born 11 January 1990) is a Swiss professional footballer who plays as a right midfielder.

== Career ==
Schönbächler was part of the 2006–07 and 2008–2009 Swiss Championship winning team.

On 17 August 2013, Schönbächler scored a hat-trick for Zürich in the first round of the Swiss Cup, leading his side to a 6–0 victory over FC Bassersdorf. In the next round on 15 September 2013, Schönbächler scored Zürich's second goal, as his side twice came from behind to defeat Stade Lausanne Ouchy 3–2. Schönbächler's goal-scoring streak continued into the quarter-finals, as he scored Zürich's equalizing goal in an eventual 4–1 defeat of FC Baden in the quarter-finals on 9 November. His first league goal of the season came on 24 November, scoring Zürich's second goal in a 4–1 defeat of FC Sion.

== Honours ==
FC Zürich

- Swiss Super League: 2006–07, 2008–09
- Swiss Cup: 2013–14, 2015–16, 2017–18

=== Individual ===
- Swiss Super League Team of the Year: 2014–15
