= Daniele Romano =

Italian footballer (born 1993)

Personal information
- Date of birth: 5 May 1993 (age 33)
- Place of birth: Italy
- Height: 1.75 m (5 ft 9 in)
- Position: Left midfielder

Team information
- Current team: FC Baden
- Number: 22

Youth career
- FC Aarau

Senior career*
Years	Team	Apps	(Gls)
2011–2012	FC Wohlen	19	(3)
2012–2017	FC Aarau	61	(3)
2014	→ FC Wohlen (loan)	8	(0)
2014–2015	→ Lausanne-Sport (loan)	22	(1)
2017–2018	FC Wohlen	34	(2)
2019	SC Cham	2	(0)
2020–	FC Baden	102	(9)
- * Club domestic league appearances and goals as of 28 May 2024

Daniele Romano (born 5 May 1993) is an Italian footballer who plays for FC Baden.

== Career ==
=== Club career ===
Romano signed with SC Cham on 21 January 2019. After his second game for Scham, he got injured with a torn meniscus and didn't play any more games for the club. He left the club at the end of the season. In January 2020, he began training with FC Baden without playing for the club. However, he was registered to play for the club from the 2020–21 season.

== Personal life ==
Daniele is the nephew of Salvatore Romano.
