= Mathieu Béda =

French footballer (born 1981)

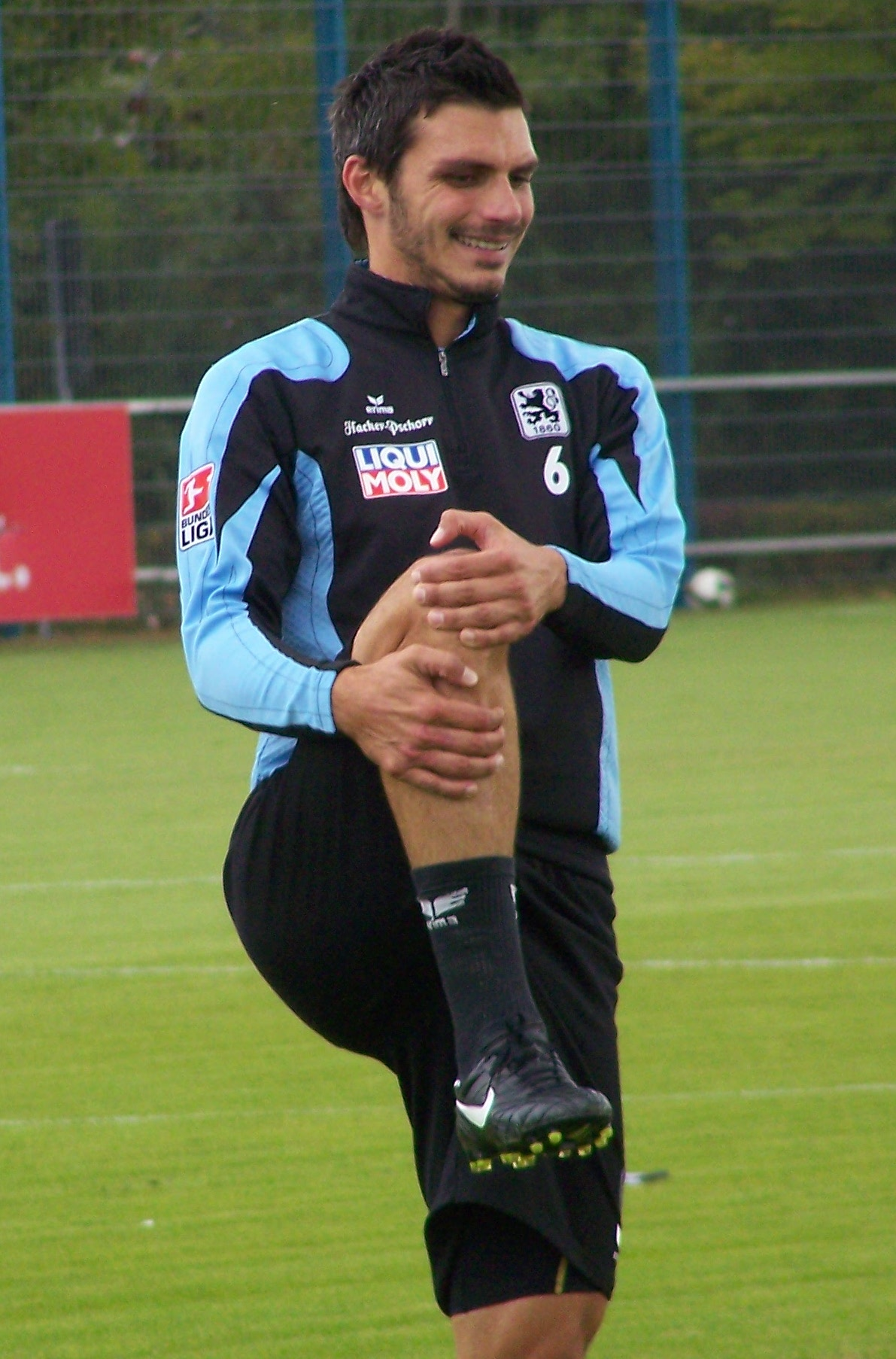
- Béda in 2009

Personal information
- Full name: Mathieu Béda
- Date of birth: 28 July 1981 (age 45)
- Place of birth: Nice, France
- Height: 1.86 m (6 ft 1 in)
- Position: Defender

Youth career
- –1991: Vence
- 1991–1997: Cannes

Senior career*
Years	Team	Apps	(Gls)
1998–1999	Cannes		
1999–2002	Bordeaux	0	(0)
2001–2002	→ Nancy (loan)	17	(0)
2002–2004	Bordeaux	11	(1)
2004–2005	Sint-Truiden	20	(3)
2005	Standard Liège	14	(0)
2006–2008	1. FC Kaiserslautern	67	(0)
2008–2010	1860 Munich	39	(0)
2011–2013	FC Zürich	65	(4)
- * Club domestic league appearances and goals

Mathieu Béda (born 28 July 1981) is a French former professional footballer who played as a defender.
