= Oliver Buff =

Swiss footballer (born 1992)

Personal information
- Date of birth: 3 August 1992 (age 34)
- Place of birth: Baden, Switzerland
- Height: 1.76 m (5 ft 9 in)
- Position: Midfielder

Youth career
- 2002–2005: Oetwil-Geroldswil
- 2005–2009: FC Zürich

Senior career*
Years	Team	Apps	(Gls)
2009–2011	FC Zürich II	14	(3)
2010–2017	FC Zürich	173	(21)
2017–2019	Zaragoza	36	(2)
2019	Anorthosis Famagusta	8	(1)
2020	Grasshoppers	18	(3)
2021	Selangor	19	(6)
2022–2023	Žalgiris	37	(1)

International career
2008–2009	Switzerland U17	20	(1)
2009–2011	Switzerland U19	15	(1)
2011–2014	Switzerland U21	16	(2)
2012	Switzerland Olympic	1	(0)

Managerial career
- 2024–: Grasshoppers U15 (assistant)
- * Club domestic league appearances and goals as of 27 March 2024

Oliver Buff (born 3 August 1992) is a Swiss professional footballer who plays as a midfielder.

He is currently assistant coach of Grasshopper Club Zürich U-15 team.

== Career ==
=== FC Zürich ===
Buff spent his youth years with FC Zürich and became part of the first team in 2010. He won the 2013–14 Swiss Cup and 2015–16 Swiss Cup with Zürich. After 12 years with the club he decided in May 2017 to not renew his contract.

=== Zaragoza ===
On 13 June 2017, Buff signed a two-year deal with Spanish Segunda División side Real Zaragoza.

=== Anorthosis Famagusta ===
In January 2019 Buff transferred for a reported 125,000 Euro to Anorthosis Famagusta and signed a contract up until the end of the season.

=== Grasshoppers ===
On 15 October 2019, Buff, who at that time was not under contract, signed for Grasshopper Club Zürich until the end of the season.

=== Selangor ===
After a year becoming a free agent, Buff switch sides and reach agreement to join Malaysia Super League club Selangor on 26 January 2021. He made his debut and scored two goals for the club against Sri Pahang with a 3–1 victory at the league matches.

== International career ==
Buff is a Switzerland youth international. In 2009, he was part of the Swiss under-17 team that won the 2009 FIFA U-17 World Cup beating host nation Nigeria 1–0 in the final. Buff played in 6 of the 7 matches at the tournament and scored in the team's quarter-final against Italy.

== Career statistics ==
As of 17 March 2021

Appearances and goals by club, season and competition
Club	Season	League			Cup (Note: Includes Swiss Cup, Copa del Rey, Malaysia FA Cup)		League Cup (Note: Includes Malaysia Cup)		Continental		Total	
Club	Season	Division	Apps	Goals	Apps	Goals	Apps	Goals	Apps	Goals	Apps	Goals
FC Zürich	2009–10	Swiss Super League	6	1	0	0	—		0	0	6	1
FC Zürich	2010–11	Swiss Super League	10	0	2	0	—		0	0	12	0
FC Zürich	2011–12	Swiss Super League	25	3	1	0	—		5 (Note: Two Appearances in UEFA Champions League, Three Appearances in UEFA Europa League)	1	31	4
FC Zürich	2012–13	Swiss Super League	24	1	2	0	—		0	0	26	1
FC Zürich	2013–14	Swiss Super League	22	0	4	0	—		2 (Note: Appearances in UEFA Europa League)	0	28	0
FC Zürich	2014–15	Swiss Super League	30	0	3	0	—		7	1	40	1
FC Zürich	2015–16	Swiss Super League	31	8	4	2	—		2	0	37	10
FC Zürich	2016–17	Swiss Challenge League	25	8	3	2	—		3	0	31	10
FC Zürich	Total		173	21	19	4	0	0	19	2	211	27
Zaragoza	2017–18	Segunda División	28	2	3	0	—		—		31	2
Zaragoza	2018–19	Segunda División	8	0	2	0	—		—		10	0
Zaragoza	Total		36	2	5	0	0	0	0	0	41	2
Anorthosis Famagusta	2018–19	Cypriot First Division	8	1	0	0	—		—		8	1
Grasshoppers	2019–20	Swiss Challenge League	18	3	0	0	—		—		18	3
Selangor	2021	Malaysia Super League	19	6	0	0	2	0	—		21	6
Career total			254	33	24	4	2	0	19	2	299	39

== Honours ==
Switzerland U17

- FIFA U-17 World Cup: 2009
