= Tibert Pont =

Swiss footballer (born 1984)

Personal information
- Full name: Tibert Pont
- Date of birth: 23 January 1984 (age 42)
- Place of birth: Geneva, Switzerland
- Height: 1.79 m (5 ft 10 in)
- Position: Midfielder

Youth career
- Servette

Senior career*
Years	Team	Apps	(Gls)
2002–2017	Servette	274	(30)
- * Club domestic league appearances and goals

Tibert Pont (born 23 January 1984) is a Swiss former footballer.
