= Paraíso do Norte =

Coordinates: 23°13′S 52°38′W

- Municipality
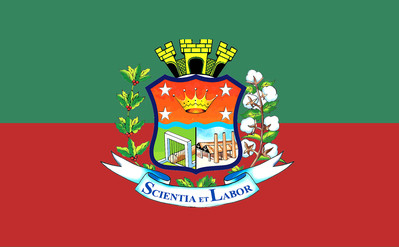
- Flag
- Interactive map of Paraíso do Norte
- Country: Brazil
- Region: Southern
- State: Paraná
- Mesoregion: Noroeste Paranaense

Population (2020)
  - Total: 14,023
- Time zone: UTC−3 (BRT)

Paraíso do Norte is a municipality in the state of Paraná in the Southern Region of Brazil.

== See also ==
- List of municipalities in Paraná
