= Eudis =

Brazilian footballer (born 1983)

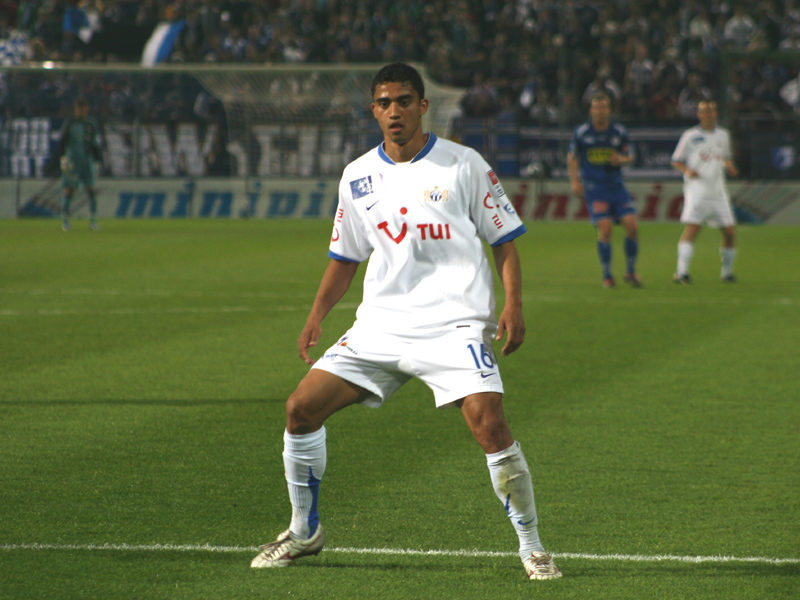

Personal information
- Full name: Eudi Silva da Souza
- Date of birth: 5 August 1983 (age 43)
- Place of birth: Paraíso do Norte, Brazil
- Height: 1.79 m (5 ft 10 1/2 in)
- Position: Striker

Team information
- Current team: FC Suchy-Sports

Youth career
- 2001–2002: Atlético Paranaense

Senior career*
Years	Team	Apps	(Gls)
2003–2005	Yverdon-Sport	28	(5)
2005–2006	Lausanne-Sport	35	(16)
2006–2008	FC Zürich	32	(5)
2008–2009	Young Boys	10	(1)
2008–2009	→ Servette (loan)	13	(0)
2009–2013	Servette	103	(38)
2013	Hapoel Ra'anana	16	(1)
2014	Maccabi Herzliya	15	(3)
2015–2017	Paranavaí	0	(0)
2019–2020	Stade-Payerne	9	
2020–	FC Suchy-Sports		
- * Club domestic league appearances and goals as of 30 June 2014

Eudi Silva de Souza, commonly known as Eudis (born 5 August 1983) is a Brazilian footballer who plays for Swiss club FC Suchy-Sports.

== Career ==
He had a contract with FC Zurich till 2009 and was part of the 2006–07 Swiss Championship winning team, he left than in summer Zürich and moved to BSC Young Boys. His move to BSC Young Boys did not work out so he had two loan spells at Servette FC before joining on a permanent deal.

Eudi has previously played for Yverdon-Sport and FC Lausanne-Sport in the Swiss Challenge League.

On 1 March 2009 he signed for Servette FC on loan from BSC Young Boys. He had successful loan spells at Servette FC, so he joined them on a permanent deal.

In the summer 2012 transfer window, Eudis' contract with Servette expired, and it initially seemed that he would be leaving the club. However, on August 2, it was announced that Eudis had signed a five-month contract extension, with an option for a further six months.

== Honours ==
- Swiss League: 2007
