= Sangoné Sarr =

Senegalese footballer

Personal information
- Date of birth: 7 July 1992 (age 34)
- Place of birth: Dakar, Senegal
- Height: 1.81 m (5 ft 11 in)
- Position: Midfielder

Team information
- Current team: Schaffhausen
- Number: 90

Senior career*
Years	Team	Apps	(Gls)
–2011	Jeanne d'Arc		
2011–2012	Renaissance de Dakar		
2012–2015	Pikine		
2015–2020	Zürich	56	(3)
2019	→ Rapperswil-Jona (loan)	15	(2)
2020–	Schaffhausen	22	(0)
- * Club domestic league appearances and goals as of 21:33, 1 November 2022 (UTC)

Sangoné Sarr (born 7 July 1992) is a Senegalese professional footballer who plays as a midfielder for Schaffhausen in Switzerland.

== Career ==
Sarr played for Jeanne d'Arc, Renaissance de Dakar and AS Pikine before joining FC Zürich players in 2015.

On 18 January 2019, Sarr was loaned out to FC Rapperswil-Jona from FC Zürich for the rest of the season.
