= Philippe Koch =

Swiss footballer (born 1991)

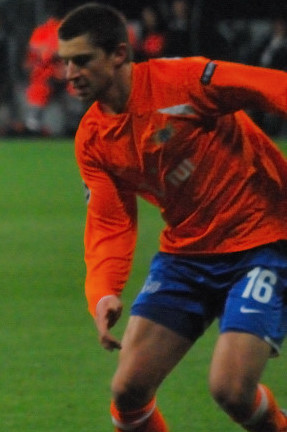
- Philippe Koch in 2009

Personal information
- Date of birth: 8 February 1991 (age 35)
- Place of birth: Jegenstorf, Switzerland
- Height: 1.79 m (5 ft 10 in)
- Position: Right back

Youth career
- 1999–2002: FC Biberist
- 2002–2007: FC Solothurn
- 2007: FC Biel-Bienne
- 2007–2008: FC Zürich

Senior career*
Years	Team	Apps	(Gls)
2008–2016	FC Zürich	201	(5)
2016–2017	Novara Calcio	3	(0)
2017–2019	FC St. Gallen	15	(0)

International career
2009–2012	Switzerland U-21	23	(1)
- * Club domestic league appearances and goals as of 14:35, 19 July 2019 (UTC)

Philippe Koch (born 8 February 1991) is a Swiss football defender who most recently played for Swiss club FC St. Gallen.

== Club career ==
=== FC Zürich ===
He joined the first team of FC Zurich in 2008 after coming through the hugely successful FC Zurich academy, then his older brother Raphael Koch joined him in the first team in 2009. He made his first-team debut in August 2008 in the UEFA Cup. He was captain of the team winning the 2013–14 Swiss Cup and won the Cup again in 2015–16.

== Honours ==
- Swiss Super League (1): 2008–09
- Swiss Cup (2): 2013–14, 2015–16
