= Jorge Teixeira =

Portuguese footballer

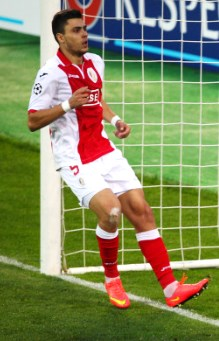
- Teixeira in action for Standard Liège in 2014

Personal information
- Full name: Jorge Filipe Avelino Teixeira
- Date of birth: 27 August 1986 (age 40)
- Place of birth: Lisbon, Portugal
- Height: 1.88 m (6 ft 2 in)
- Position: Centre-back

Team information
- Current team: Alcochetense

Youth career
- 1995–1997: Catujalense
- 1997–2005: Sporting CP

Senior career*
Years	Team	Apps	(Gls)
2005–2006	Casa Pia	30	(3)
2006–2007	Odivelas	23	(1)
2007–2008	Fátima	18	(0)
2008	Atromitos	17	(1)
2009	AEP	12	(0)
2009–2010	Maccabi Haifa	27	(1)
2010–2014	Zürich	92	(8)
2013	→ Siena (loan)	9	(0)
2014–2016	Standard Liège	35	(4)
2016–2017	Charlton Athletic	39	(6)
2017–2023	Sint-Truiden	135	(6)
2023–2025	AVS	23	(0)
2025–2026	Belenenses	14	(1)
2026–	Alcochetense	2	(0)
- * Club domestic league appearances and goals as of 08:33, 3 September 2026 (UTC)

Jorge Filipe Avelino Teixeira (born 27 August 1986) is a Portuguese professional footballer who plays as a central defender for Campeonato de Portugal club GD Alcochetense.

He spent most of his career abroad, mainly 170 games in the Belgian Pro League with Standard Liège and Sint-Truiden, while also winning the Swiss Cup with Zürich in 2014. Additionally, he had spells in Cyprus, Israel, Italy and England.

== Club career ==
=== Early career ===
Born in Lisbon, Teixeira spent eight years in Sporting CP's youth system, but never appeared officially for its first team, being released in 2005 and spending his first two seasons as a senior in the third division, with Casa Pia A.C. and Odivelas FC, both hailing from the Lisbon Region. In 2007–08 he made his debut in the Segunda Liga, being relegated with C.D. Fátima.

=== Six teams in five countries ===
Teixeira split the 2008–09 campaign between two teams in Cyprus, suffering relegation with Atromitos Yeroskipou. In summer 2009 he signed for Maccabi Haifa F.C. and, the following year, joined FC Zürich of Switzerland, who paid a fee of $1.2 million to the Israeli side.

On 20 July 2010, Teixeira made his Super League debut with his new club, opening an eventual 3–2 away loss against FC Basel. In January 2013, he was loaned to Italy's AC Siena until June, starting in all his league appearances but being relegated from Serie A.

In May 2014, after helping Zürich to capture the Swiss Cup in a defeat of Basel, Teixeira joined Standard Liége on a three-year contract to be made effective on 30 June.

=== Charlton Athletic ===
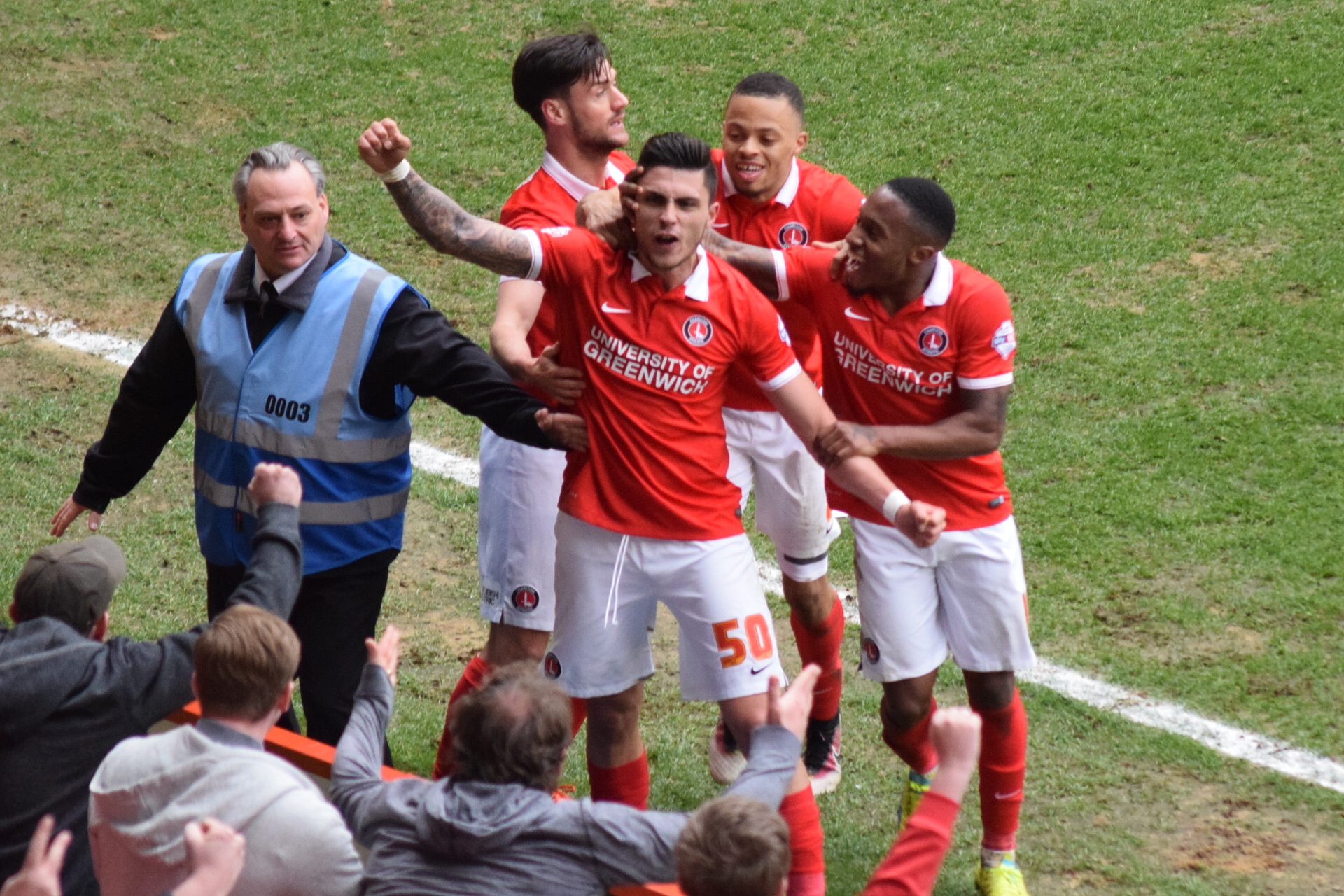
Teixeira after scoring for Charlton against Birmingham City

On 19 January 2016, Teixeira moved teams and countries again, signing a four-and-a-half-year deal with Charlton Athletic for an undisclosed fee, under former Standard manager José Riga. His maiden appearance in the Championship occurred four days later, as he played the full 90 minutes in a 1–1 home draw with Blackburn Rovers. He scored in home wins over Middlesbrough and Birmingham City, as his team suffered relegation.

Teixeira was close to a loan move to S.V. Zulte Waregem back in Belgium for 2016–17, but it collapsed due to his high salary and the signing of fellow defender Luca Marrone from Juventus FC. He missed the start of the League One season due to a hamstring injury, and on 14 January he was sent off at the end of a goalless draw against local rivals Millwall at The Valley. On 18 February, he came on as a second-half substitute and scored twice in a 3–3 draw at Rochdale, including the equaliser.

=== Sint-Truiden ===
On 15 July 2017, Teixeira joined Sint-Truidense V.V. on a three-year contract. He suffered a hip injury in September 2019, and did not return until February.

Teixeira added one more year to his contract in January 2021, and February 2022.

=== Later career ===
On 30 June 2023, Teixeira returned to his country's leagues for the first time in 15 years, signing with second division side AVS Futebol SAD; he was their first signing since the merger and relocation of U.D. Vilafranquense and C.D. Aves. He contributed 12 games in his first season, helping to promotion to the Primeira Liga.

Teixeira made his Portuguese top-tier debut on 16 August 2024 aged 37 years and 11 months, as a 66th-minute substitute for top scorer Nenê – they played roughly 30 minutes with ten men after Samuel Granada was sent off – in an eventual 4–2 away defeat to Gil Vicente FC.

Teixeira dropped down two divisions on 12 June 2025, joining C.F. Os Belenenses.

== Honours ==
Zürich

- Swiss Cup: 2013–14
