= Nikola Milosavljevic =

Swiss footballer (born 1996)

Personal information
- Full name: Nikola Milosavljevic
- Date of birth: 24 April 1996 (age 30)
- Place of birth: Switzerland
- Height: 1.80 m (5 ft 11 in)
- Position: Midfielder

Team information
- Current team: Bellinzona (on loan from Sion)
- Number: 17

Youth career
- Lugano

Senior career*
Years	Team	Apps	(Gls)
2013–2016	Lugano	14	(0)
2016–2016	Chiasso	17	(1)
2017–2020	Sion B	11	(2)
2017–2020	Sion	6	(0)
2018–2019	→ Winterthur (loan)	17	(0)
2019	→ Chiasso (loan)	15	(1)
2019–2020	→ Bellinzona (loan)	13	(0)
2020–2022	Bellinzona	20	(0)
2022–	FC Paradiso	69	(0)
- * Club domestic league appearances and goals as of 13:38, 7 April 2024 (EST)

Nikola Milosavljevic (born 24 April 1996) is a footballer who plays for Swiss Promotion League club FC Paradiso. Born in Switzerland to Serbian parents, Milosavljevic has chosen to represent Switzerland at an international level. However, he has not yet received an international call-up
