= Marcos de Azevedo =

Brazilian footballer

Personal information
- Full name: Antônio Marcos de Azevedo
- Date of birth: 23 November 1981 (age 44)
- Place of birth: Toledo, Brazil
- Height: 1.75 m (5 ft 9 in)
- Position: Midfielder

Senior career*
Years	Team	Apps	(Gls)
2004–2005	Brasil de Farroupilha		
2005–2007	YF Juventus	56	(9)
2007–2009	La Chaux-de-Fonds	58	(15)
2009–2013	Servette	62	(23)
2013–2015	Ermis Aradippou	28	(9)
- * Club domestic league appearances and goals

Antônio Marcos de Azevedo, sometimes known as Marquinhos (born 23 November 1981) is a former Brazilian footballer.
