= 2009 UEFA European Under-19 Championship elite qualification =

The Elite Round of the 2009 UEFA European Under-19 Championship is the second round of qualification. The winners of each group join hosts Ukraine at the Final Tournament.

== Group 1 ==
Team	Pld	W	D	L	GF	GA	GD	Pts
Serbia	3	2	1	0	5	1	+4	7
Finland	3	1	1	1	4	3	+1	4
Hungary	3	1	0	2	4	5	−1	3
Austria	3	1	0	2	3	7	−4	3

12 May 2009
14:00 CET

Hungary	2 – 3	Austria
Simon 14'; Tischler 56'	Report	Gravogl 35', 45+1'; Dragović 44'

FK Tavankut Stadium, Tavankut, Serbia
Referee: Marcin Borski (Poland)

12 May 2009
16:30 CET

Serbia	1 – 1	Finland
Ljajić 49'	Report	Pukki 6'

City Stadium, Subotica, Serbia
Attendance: 700
Referee: Halis Özkahya (Turkey)

14 May 2009
14:00 CET

Finland	1 – 2	Hungary
Pukki 18'	Report	Simon 6'; Tamasi 77'

FK Tavankut Stadium, Tavankut, Serbia
Referee: Simon Lee Evans (Wales)

14 May 2009
16:30 CET

Serbia	3 – 0	Austria
Savić 47'; Ljajić 55'; Milić 59'	Report

Bačka Stadium, Subotica, Serbia
Attendance: 1,000
Referee: Halis Özkahya (Turkey)

17 May 2009
16:30 CET

Hungary	0 – 1	Serbia
	Report	Miljković 33'

City Stadium, Subotica, Serbia
Attendance: 1,000
Referee: Simon Lee Evans (Wales)

17 May 2009
16:30 CET

Austria	0 – 2	Finland
	Report	Lepola 45'; Pukki 90'

Bačka Stadium, Subotica, Serbia
Referee: Marcin Borski (Poland)

== Group 2 ==
Team	Pld	W	D	L	GF	GA	GD	Pts
Slovenia	3	1	2	0	6	4	2	5
Netherlands	3	1	2	0	3	2	1	5
Russia	3	0	2	1	6	7	-1	2
Belarus	3	0	2	1	2	4	-2	2

4 June 2009
17:00 CET

Russia	3 – 3	Slovenia
Smolov 15', 19'; Grigoryev 79' (pen.)	Report	Rep 13', 40', 53' (pen.)

Športni park, Lendava, Slovenia
Referee: Anders Hermansen (Denmark)

4 June 2009
17:00 CET

Netherlands	0 – 0	Belarus
	Report

Fazanerija, Murska Sobota, Slovenia
Referee: Stuart Attwell (England)

6 June 2009
17:00 CET

Russia	2 – 2	Belarus
Grigoryev 27'; Shumilin 79'	Report	Rakhmanov 2'; Erchik 57'

Športni park, Lendava, Slovenia
Referee: Anders Hermansen (Denmark)

6 June 2009
17:00 CET

Slovenia	1 – 1	Netherlands
Rep 53'	Report	Vejinović 8'

Fazanerija, Murska Sobota, Slovenia
Referee: Menashe Masiah (Israel)

9 June 2009
17:00 CET

Netherlands	2 - 1	Russia
Van Aanholt 31'; Vejinović 90' (pen.)	Report	Dmitriyev 49'

Športni park, Lendava, Slovenia
Referee: Stuart Attwell (England)

9 June 2009
17:00 CET

Belarus	0 - 2	Slovenia
	Report	Omerovic 15'; Rep 22' (pen.)

Fazanerija, Murska Sobota, Slovenia
Referee: Menashe Masiah (Israel)

== Group 3 ==
Team	Pld	W	D	L	GF	GA	GD	Pts
Turkey	3	3	0	0	7	1	+6	9
Portugal	3	2	0	1	4	4	0	6
Denmark	3	1	0	2	1	4	−3	3
Greece	3	0	0	3	1	4	−3	0

23 May 2009
18:00 CET

Turkey	2 – 1	Greece
Yıldırım 67'; Albayrak 87'	Report	Matsoukas 90+5' (pen.)

Estádio Municipal, Torres Novas, Portugal
Referee: Luca Banti (Italy)

23 May 2009
18:00 CET

Portugal	3 – 0	Denmark
Fonte 6'; Reis 68'; Rosado 70'	Report

Estádio Municipal, Rio Maior, Portugal
Referee: Maxim Layushkin (Russia)

25 May 2009
19:00 CET

Turkey	1 – 0	Denmark
Torun 43'	Report

Estádio Municipal, Fátima, Portugal
Referee: Alan Muir (Scotland)

25 May 2009
19:00 CET

Greece	0 – 1	Portugal
	Report	Fonte 4'

Estádio Municipal, Cartaxo, Portugal
Referee: Maxim Layushkin (Russia)

28 May 2009
19:00 CET

Portugal	0 – 4	Turkey
	Report	Yıldırım 42', 69'; Ayık 78'; Torun 90+4'

Estádio Municipal, Cartaxo, Portugal
Referee: Luca Banti (Italy)

28 May 2009
19:00 CET

Denmark	1 – 0	Greece
Møller 3'	Report

Estádio Municipal, Rio Maior, Portugal
Referee: Alan Muir (Scotland)

== Group 4 ==
Team	Pld	W	D	L	GF	GA	GD	Pts
Switzerland	3	2	1	0	10	3	7	7
Belgium	3	2	1	0	7	1	6	7
Republic of Ireland	3	1	0	2	3	8	-5	3
Sweden	3	0	0	3	2	10	-8	0

5 June 2009
19:00 CET

Belgium	1 – 0	Republic of Ireland
Hazard 39'	Report

Complex Op De Keiberg, Tongeren, Belgium
Referee: Aleksei Kulbakov (Belarus)

5 June 2009

Switzerland	3 – 1	Sweden
R. Koch 34'; Basha 48', 84'	Report	Sudić 25'

Sportcentrum, Tessenderlo, Belgium
Referee: Vasilios Pamporidis (Greece)

7 June 2009
19:00 CET

Belgium	5 – 0	Sweden
François 13', 36'; Hazard 33'; Benteke 39', 78'	Report

Mijnstadion, Beringen, Belgium
Referee: Fernando Teixeira Vitienes (Spain)

7 June 2009
16:00 CET

Republic of Ireland	1 – 6	Switzerland
Scannell 66'	Report	Unal 30'; R. Koch 44'; Lang 52'; Pasche 69', 76'; Mustafi 88'

Complex Op De Keiberg, Tongeren, Belgium
Referee: Vasilios Pamporidis (Greece)

10 June 2009
19:00 CET

Switzerland	1 - 1	Belgium
Wüthrich 15'	Report	Hazard 21' (pen.)

Mijnstadion, Beringen, Belgium
Referee: Fernando Teixeira Vitienes (Spain)

10 June 2009
19:00 CET

Sweden	1 - 2	Republic of Ireland
Jönsson 39'	Report	Doran 30'; Collins 74'

Sportcentrum, Tessenderlo, Belgium
Referee: Aleksei Kulbakov (Belarus)

== Group 5 ==
Team	Pld	W	D	L	GF	GA	GD	Pts
France	3	2	0	1	8	3	+5	6
Norway	3	1	2	0	3	2	+1	5
Romania	3	1	1	1	3	4	−1	4
Latvia	3	0	1	2	1	6	−5	1

18 May 2009
19:00 CET

France	1 – 2	Norway
Bulot 10'	Report	Lundebakken 31'; Wangberg 35'

Henri Jeanne, Bayeux, France
Attendance: 1020
Referee: Libor Kovařík (Czech Republic)

18 May 2009
18:30 CET

Romania	2 – 0	Latvia
Râpă 53'; Alibec 58'	Report

Michel Farre, Mondeville, France
Attendance: 400
Referee: Goran Spirkoski (North Macedonia)

20 May 2009
18:30 CET

France	4 – 1	Latvia
Dikamona 43'; Partouche 48', 62'; Gueye 90'	Report	Dubra 66' (pen.)

Michel Farre, Mondeville, France
Attendance: 1957
Referee: Libor Kovařík (Czech Republic)

20 May 2009
18:30 CET

Norway	1 – 1	Romania
Helland 74'	Report	Alexe 89'

Louis Villemer, Saint-Lô, France
Attendance: 800
Referee: Andre Marriner (England)

23 May 2009
19:00 CET

Romania	0 – 3	France
	Report	Makonda 25'; M'Vila 61'; Le Tallec 88'

Louis Villemer, Saint-Lô, France
Attendance: 2710
Referee: Andre Marriner (England)

23 May 2009
19:00 CET

Latvia	0 – 0	Norway
	Report

Henri Jeanne, Bayeux, France
Attendance: 150
Referee: Goran Spirkoski (North Macedonia)

== Group 6 ==
Team	Pld	W	D	L	GF	GA	GD	Pts
England	3	3	0	0	8	2	+6	9
Scotland	3	2	0	1	6	3	+3	6
Slovakia	3	1	0	2	3	6	–3	3
Bosnia and Herzegovina	3	0	0	3	0	6	–6	0

27 May 2009
19:00

Scotland	2 – 1	Slovakia
Stirling 54' (pen.); Ness 69'	Report	Guldan 29' (pen.)

Bramall Lane, Sheffield, England
Attendance: 300
Referee: Carlos Clos Gómez (Spain)

27 May 2009
20:00 CET

England	2 – 0	Bosnia and Herzegovina
Rose 40'; Ranger 85'	Report

Keepmoat, Doncaster, England
Attendance: 1071
Referee: Albert Toussaint (Luxembourg)

29 May 2009
20:00 CET

Scotland	3 – 0	Bosnia and Herzegovina
Perry 5'; MacDonald 12'; Currie 73' (pen.)	Report

Keepmoat, Doncaster, England
Referee: Albert Toussaint (Luxembourg)

29 May 2009
20:00 CET

Slovakia	1 – 4	England
Gál-Andrezly 57'	Report	Ranger 28', 51'; Delfouneso 88', 90+2'

Valley Parade, Bradford, England
Referee: Mihaly Fabian (Hungary)

1 June 2009
20:00 CET

England	2 – 1	Scotland
Ranger 65'; Moses 72'	Report	MacDonald 85' (pen.)

Bramall Lane, Sheffield, England
Referee: Carlos Clos Gómez (Spain)

1 June 2009
20:00 CET

Bosnia and Herzegovina	0 – 1	Slovakia
	Report	Gál-Andrezly 65'

Valley Parade, Bradford, England
Attendance: 252
Referee: Mihaly Fabian (Hungary)

== Group 7 ==
Team	Pld	W	D	L	GF	GA	GD	Pts
Spain	3	3	0	0	9	1	+8	9
Germany	3	2	0	1	6	1	+5	6
Czech Republic	3	1	0	2	6	7	–1	3
Estonia	3	0	0	3	1	13	–12	0

21 May 2009
17:00 EEST

Spain	5 – 1	Czech Republic
Sielva 9'; Joselu 44'; Mérida 54'; Aquino 90'; Falque 90+1'	Report	Mišůn 74'

Kadrioru Stadium, Tallinn, Estonia
Attendance: 250
Referee: Ioannis Stavridis (Greece)

21 May 2009
19:30 EEST

Germany	5 – 0	Estonia
Schürrle 23', 73'; Holtby 35'; Rode 74'; Wolze 85'	Report

A. Le Coq Arena, Tallinn, Estonia
Attendance: 5480
Referee: Michael Lerjeus (Sweden)

23 May 2009
17:00 EEST

Germany	1 – 0	Czech Republic
Holtby 33'	Report

Kadrioru Stadium, Tallinn, Estonia
Attendance: 180
Referee: Mauro Bergonzi (Italy)

23 May 2009
19:30 EEST

Estonia	0 – 3	Spain
	Report	Aquino 12'; Thiago 30'; Chirri 62'

A. Le Coq Arena, Tallinn, Estonia
Attendance: 6860
Referee: Ioannis Stavridis (Greece)

26 May 2009
19:30 EEST

Spain	1 – 0	Germany
Mérida 70' (pen.)	Report

Kadrioru Stadium, Tallinn, Estonia
Attendance: 580
Referee: Mauro Bergonzi (Italy)

26 May 2009
19:30 EEST

Czech Republic	5 – 1	Estonia
Navrátil 25', 77'; Šural 50'; Kraut 90+1', 90+2'	Report	Tamm 1'

A. Le Coq Arena, Tallinn, Estonia
Attendance: 6483
Referee: Michael Lerjeus (Sweden)
