= 2013 UEFA Women's Under-17 Championship qualification =

Football tournament qualification stage

The 2013 UEFA Women's Under-17 Championship qualification were two rounds of qualifying tournaments for the 2013 UEFA Women's Under-17 Championship, held in Switzerland.

With a return of Slovakia, who haven't been played since the inaugural edition, and Under-17 newcomers Montenegro a new record of 44 participating nations was set. The 44 UEFA members were divided into 11 groups of four teams, with each group being contested as a mini-tournament, hosted by one of the group's teams. After all matches have been played, the 11 group winners and the five best runner-up teams will advance to the second round.

The draw was made on 15 November 2011. Matches were played from 28 August 2012 to 3 November 2012.

== First round ==
=== Seeding ===
The seedings were done according to the Under-17 coefficient ranking. There were three pots, with the eleven highest ranked strongest teams in Pot A, the next eleven in Pot B and the rest in Pot C.

- Pot A

Germany, Spain, France, Netherlands, Norway, Republic of Ireland, Sweden, Czech Republic, Switzerland, Denmark, England

- Pot B

Belgium, Italy, Iceland, Scotland, Poland, Finland, Wales, Russia, Hungary, Ukraine, Austria

- Pot C

Serbia, Slovenia, Turkey, Romania, Belarus, Lithuania, Former Yugoslav Republic of Macedonia, Croatia, Greece, Estonia, Kazakhstan, Faroe Islands, Latvia, Northern Ireland, Israel, Azerbaijan, Moldova, Bulgaria, Georgia, Bosnia and Herzegovina, Montenegro, Slovakia

The hosts of the eleven one-venue mini-tournament groups are indicated below.

=== Tiebreakers ===
Tie-breakers between teams with the same number of points are:

1. Higher number of points obtained in the matches played between the teams in question
2. Superior goal difference resulting from the matches played between the teams in question
3. Higher number of goals scored in the matches played between the teams in question

If now two teams still are tied, reapply tie-breakers 1–3, if this does not break the tie, go on.

1. Superior goal difference in all group matches
2. Higher number of goals scored in all group matches
3. Drawing of lots

=== Group 1 ===
Team	Pld	W	D	L	GF	GA	GD	Pts
Switzerland	3	3	0	0	21	1	+20	9
Belgium	3	2	0	1	18	2	+16	6
Bulgaria	3	1	0	2	1	20	−19	3
Moldova (H)	3	0	0	3	0	17	−17	0

(H) Hosts
19 October 2012
11:00

Switzerland	11–0	Bulgaria
Calligaris 17', 32', 37', 58', 64' (pen.); Wyder 29'; Müller 31'; Vienne 39'; Mauron 42'; Rossire 49', 70'	Report

District Sport Complex, Orhei
Referee: Vesna Mladin (Croatia)
19 October 2012
14:00

Belgium	8–0	Moldova
Maximus 3'; Van Ackere 9', 12', 22', 39', 71'; Janssens 73'; Raekelboom 78'	Report

CPSM, Vadul lui Voda
Referee: Beatriz Gil Gozalo (Spain)

21 October 2012
11:00

Bulgaria	0–9	Belgium
	Report	Iliano 8'; Aertsen 25'; Raekelboom 40+3', 51'; Vanwynsberghe 41'; Koenig 58', 78'; De Caigny 66'; Maximus 73'

District Sport Complex, Orhei
Referee: Irina Turovskaya (Belarus)
21 October 2012
14:00

Switzerland	8–0	Moldova
Stierli 6'; Calligaris 36', 51' (pen.), 53'; Mauron 46'; Schmoutz 48', 58', 80+2'	Report

CPSM, Vadul lui Voda
Referee: Beatriz Gil Gozalo (Spain)

24 October 2012
11:00

Belgium	1–2	Switzerland
Aertsen 60'	Report	Calligaris 11'; Stierli 36'

Dinamo Auto, Tîrnauca
Referee: Vesna Mladin (Croatia)
24 October 2012
14:00

Moldova	0–1	Bulgaria
	Report	Damyanova 6'

CPSM, Vadul lui Voda
Referee: Irina Turovskaya (Belarus)

=== Group 2 ===
Team	Pld	W	D	L	GF	GA	GD	Pts
Northern Ireland (H)	3	2	1	0	5	1	+4	7
Italy	3	2	0	1	9	2	+7	6
England	3	1	1	1	6	4	+2	4
Israel	3	0	0	3	1	14	−13	0

(H) Hosts
10 September 2012
15:30

Italy	5–0	Israel
Pittaccio 50', 55'; Giugliano 62', 66'; Nakav 77' (o.g.)	Report

Solitude, Belfast
Referee: Silvia Domingos (Portugal)
10 September 2012
20:30

England	0–0	Northern Ireland
	Report

Solitude, Belfast
Referee: Zuzana Strpkova (Slovakia)

12 September 2012
15:00

England	5–0	Israel
Flint 14', 19', 35'; Sampson 29'; Humphrey 42'	Report

Mill Meadow, Castledawson
Referee: Silvia Domingos (Portugal)
12 September 2012
20:30

Northern Ireland	1–0	Italy
Feehan 40+2'	Report

Mill Meadow, Castledawson
Referee: Ruzanna Petrosyan (Armenia)

15 September 2012
20:30

Italy	4–1	England
Pittaccio 12', 19', 39'; Giugliano 67'	Report	70' Flint

Ballymena Showgrounds, Ballymena
Referee: Zuzana Strpkova (Slovakia)
15 September 2012
20:30

Israel	1–4	Northern Ireland
Ibrahim 58'	Report	15', 25' Mccarron; 39' Burden; 74' Mackin

The Showgrounds, Coleraine
Referee: Ruzanna Petrosyan (Armenia)

=== Group 3 ===
Team	Pld	W	D	L	GF	GA	GD	Pts
France	3	3	0	0	22	0	+22	9
Hungary	3	1	1	1	12	8	+4	4
Bosnia and Herzegovina	3	1	1	1	8	8	0	4
Lithuania (H)	3	0	0	3	0	26	−26	0

(H) Hosts
1 October 2012
12:00

France	5–0	Bosnia and Herzegovina
Karchaoui 13'; Léger 36'; Gauvin 45', 54'; Rougemont 52'	Report

Sūduva Stadium, Marijampolė
Referee: Konstantina Mpoumpouri (Greece)
1 October 2012
15:00

Hungary	9–0	Lithuania
Kaján 12', 39', 70'; Zólyomi 31'; Szabó 53', 72'; Diószegi 56', 80+3'; Rózsa 65'	Report

SRC Alytus, Alytus
Referee: Tania Fernandes Morais (Luxembourg)

3 October 2012
12:00

Bosnia and Herzegovina	3–3	Hungary
Zukić 10'; Koprena 19'; Kapetanović 76'	Report	30' Kaján; 37' Diószegi; 79' Fenyvesi

Sūduva Stadium, Marijampolė
Referee: Kamena Georgieva (Bulgaria)
3 October 2012
15:00

France	12–0	Lithuania
Gauvin 4', 38'; Rougemont 26'; Vallet 28', 40+1'; Elisor 45'; Gasnier 51'; Noiran 52', 68'; Mansuy 54'; Pingeon 73', 77'	Report

SRC Alytus, Alytus
Referee: Tania Fernandes Morais (Luxembourg)

6 October 2012
12:00

Hungary	0–5	France
	Report	18' Rougemont; 21' Léger; 25', 52', 69' Gauvin

Sūduva Stadium, Marijampolė
Referee: Tania Fernandes Morais (Luxembourg)
6 October 2012
12:00

Lithuania	0–5	Bosnia and Herzegovina
	Report	4', 15', 29', 52' Koprena; 80' Kapetanović

SRC Alytus, Alytus
Referee: Kamena Georgieva (Bulgaria)

=== Group 4 ===
Team	Pld	W	D	L	GF	GA	GD	Pts
Czech Republic	3	3	0	0	9	0	+9	9
Iceland	3	2	0	1	8	3	+5	6
Slovenia (H)	3	1	0	2	3	7	−4	3
Estonia	3	0	0	3	1	11	−10	0

(H) Hosts
6 September 2012
16:30

Czech Republic	3–0	Estonia
Křivská 5'; Svitková 59'; Švimberská 70'	Report

Sports Park, Beltinci
Attendance: 20
Referee: Eleni Lampadariou (Greece)
6 September 2012
16:30

Iceland	3–0	Slovenia
Hafsteinsdóttir 25', 49', 63'	Report

ŠRC Odranci, Odranci
Attendance: 60
Referee: Biljana Lukić (Serbia)

8 September 2012
16:30

Czech Republic	4–0	Slovenia
Majerová 1', 24'; Svitková 19', 27'	Report

Sports Park, Beltinci
Attendance: 53
Referee: Biljana Lukić (Serbia)
8 September 2012
16:30

Estonia	1–5	Iceland
Läänmäe 78'	Report	19' H. Jónsdóttir; 25' Olafsdóttir; 31' Sigurjonsdóttir; 40+2' R. Jónsdóttir; 52' Saevarsdóttir

ŠRC Odranci, Odranci
Attendance: 20
Referee: Olga Tanschi (Moldova)

11 September 2012
16:30

Slovenia	3–0	Estonia
Lombar 8'; Ivanuša 44'; Gregorčič 54'	Report

ŠRC Odranci, Odranci
Attendance: 70
Referee: Olga Tanschi (Moldova)
11 September 2012
16:30

Iceland	0–2	Czech Republic
	Report	44' Švimberská; 80+5' Bužková

Sports Park, Beltinci
Attendance: 42
Referee: Eleni Lampadariou (Greece)

=== Group 5 ===
Team	Pld	W	D	L	GF	GA	GD	Pts
Denmark	3	3	0	0	12	0	+12	9
Serbia	3	2	0	1	7	8	−1	6
Scotland	3	1	0	2	9	5	+4	3
Macedonia (H)	3	0	0	3	0	15	−15	0

(H) Hosts
29 September 2012
15:00

Denmark	4–0	Macedonia
Dybdahl 4', 60'; Andersen 62'; Hansen 76'	Report

Stadion Mladost, Strumica
Referee: Justyna Zajac (Poland)
29 September 2012
15:00

Scotland	2–3	Serbia
Graham 9'; Jackson 27'	Report	15' Blagojević; 40+2' Pantelić; 42' Matić

FC Turnovo, Strumica
Referee: Marta Frias Acedo (Spain)

1 October 2012
15:00

Denmark	6–0	Serbia
Hansen 37', 41'; Madsen 54', 80+3'; Jessen 70'; Dybdahl 80+1'	Report

Stadion Mladost, Strumica
Referee: Marta Frias Acedo (Spain)
1 October 2012
14:00

Macedonia	0–7	Scotland
	Report	13' Cairns; 39', 73', 78' Ness; 69' Sinclair; 71' Gilchrist; 80+1' Williamson

FC Turnovo, Strumica
Referee: Svetlana Cebanu (Moldova)

4 October 2012
15:00

Scotland	0–2	Denmark
	Report	11' Hansen; 33' Jessen

Stadion Mladost, Strumica
Referee: Justyna Zajac (Poland)
4 October 2012
15:00

Serbia	4–0	Macedonia
Blagojević 33', 57'; Djordjević 38'; Milivojević 40'	Report

FC Turnovo, Strumica
Referee: Svetlana Cebanu (Moldova)

=== Group 6 ===
Due to heavy snow matches set for 29 October had to be postponed a day. As a result, the second matchday was set back a day also.

Team	Pld	W	D	L	GF	GA	GD	Pts
Sweden	3	2	1	0	18	3	+15	7
Austria (H)	3	2	1	0	16	3	+13	7
Azerbaijan	3	1	0	2	8	11	−3	3
Croatia	3	0	0	3	0	25	−25	0

(H) Hosts
30 October 2012
11:00

Sweden	9–0	Croatia
Blackstenius 32', 34', 66'; Oskarsson 39', 40', 55'; Hallin 56', 58', 71'	Report

Lindabrunn
Referee: Eszter Urban (Hungary)
30 October 2012
15:00

Austria	4–1	Azerbaijan
Billa 23'; Maierhofer 30'; Aufhauser 66'; Dunst 68'	Report	Dangadze 6'

Sportzentrum Türkenhaul, Purbach am See
Referee: Virginie Derouaux (Belgium)

1 November 2012
11:00

Sweden	7–1	Azerbaijan
Andersson 11' (pen.); Hallin 27', 68'; Ohlsson 30'; Blackstenius 49'; Oskarsson 59', 63'	Report	Sarialtin 32'

Lindabrunn
Referee: Irina Tereshchenko (Russia)
1 November 2012
15:00

Croatia	0–10	Austria
	Report	Billa 9', 23', 56'; Maierhofer 32', 65'; Leitner 38', 62'; Dunst 44'; Aufhauser 48'; Knauseder 69' (pen.)

Sportzentrum Türkenhaul, Purbach am See
Referee: Virginie Derouaux (Belgium)

3 November 2012
11:00

Azerbaijan	6–0	Croatia
Mansimova 2'; Jalilli 17'; Aliyeva 25'; Nasirova 37'; Sharifova 56' (pen.); Sarialtin 70' (pen.)	Report

Lindabrunn
Referee: Irina Tereshchenko (Russia)
3 November 2012
14:30

Austria	2–2	Sweden
Billa 8', 71'	Report	Krammer 39' (o.g.); Rytting Kaneryd 42'

Lindabrunn
Referee: Eszter Urban (Hungary)

=== Group 7 ===
Team	Pld	W	D	L	GF	GA	GD	Pts
Germany	3	2	1	0	13	2	+11	7
Russia	3	2	0	1	9	9	0	6
Greece (H)	3	1	1	1	3	3	0	4
Romania	3	0	0	3	1	12	−11	0

(H) Hosts
29 October 2012
12:30

Russia	6–1	Romania
Andreeva 8', 50', 53'; Bychkova 49'; Belomyttseva 63'; Chernomyrdina 80+1'	Report	Bistrian 35'

Makedonikos Stadium, Salonika
Referee: Ivana Projkovska (Macedonia)
29 October 2012
14:30

Germany	1–1	Greece
Dieckmann 42'	Report	Trifinopoulou 6'

Kaftanzoglio Stadium, Salonika
Referee: Berta Tavares (Portugal)

31 October 2012
12:30

Germany	5–0	Romania
Sehan 22'; Mayr 30', 40', 50'; Gier 71'	Report

Makedonikos Stadium, Salonika
Referee: Ivana Projkovska (Macedonia)
31 October 2012
14:30

Greece	1–2	Russia
Giannou 62'	Report	Danilova 39'; Andreeva 52'

Kaftanzoglio Stadium, Salonika
Referee: Désirée Grundbacher (Switzerland)

3 November 2012
13:00

Russia	1–7	Germany
Belomyttseva 48'	Report	Gier 15', 16', 62'; Sehan 42', 68', 72'; Ortega-Jurado 70'

Makedonikos Stadium, Salonika
Referee: Berta Tavares (Portugal)
3 November 2012
13:00

Romania	0–1	Greece
	Report	Trifinopoulou 80+2'

Kaftanzoglio Stadium, Salonika
Referee: Désirée Grundbacher (Switzerland)

=== Group 8 ===
Vivianne Miedema's eight goals in the match against Kazakhstan set a new competition record.

Team	Pld	W	D	L	GF	GA	GD	Pts
Netherlands (H)	3	3	0	0	42	0	+42	9
Montenegro	3	2	0	1	5	16	−11	6
Ukraine	3	1	0	2	6	17	−11	3
Kazakhstan	3	0	0	3	1	21	−20	0

(H) Hosts
20 October 2012
14:30

Netherlands	15–0	Montenegro
Miedema 8', 30', 43', 63', 75', 80+1'; Admiraal 10', 25', 52'; Roord 34', 53', 80'; Huisman 42', 55'; Strik 78'	Report

Sportpark Ezinge, Meppel
Referee: Evgenia Kaskantiri (Greece)
20 October 2012
16:30

Ukraine	6–0	Kazakhstan
Korniychuk 4', 35', 57'; Boiko 27', 31'; Abisheva 41' (o.g.)	Report

Sportpark Oostenburg, Oosterwolde
Referee: Kristina Husballe (Denmark)

22 October 2012
14:30

Montenegro	1–0	Ukraine
Vulić 40+3' (pen.)	Report

Sportpark Ezinge, Meppel
Referee: Agnieszka Plaskocinska (Poland)
22 October 2012
16:30

Netherlands	11–0	Kazakhstan
Admiraal 5'; Miedema 18', 22', 27', 38', 43', 46', 74', 80+4'; Hendriks 53', 72'	Report

Sportpark Oostenburg, Oosterwolde
Referee: Kristina Husballe (Denmark)

25 October 2012
15:00

Ukraine	0–16	Netherlands
	Report	Roord 9', 30', 32', 51', 54', 69'; Miedema 18', 25', 28', 42'; Hendriks 40'; Andrukhiv 48' (o.g.); Abbing 55', 57'; Admiraal 60'; Strik 73'

Sportpark Ezinge, Meppel
Referee: Evgenia Kaskantiri (Greece)
25 October 2012
15:00

Kazakhstan	1–4	Montenegro
Bortnikova 47'	Report	Čorić 5'; Bojat 23', 51', 59'

Sportpark Oostenburg, Oosterwolde
Referee: Agnieszka Plaskocinska (Poland)

=== Group 9 ===
Team	Pld	W	D	L	GF	GA	GD	Pts
Republic of Ireland	3	3	0	0	12	1	+11	9
Finland	3	2	0	1	15	2	+13	6
Belarus (H)	3	1	0	2	4	7	−3	3
Georgia	3	0	0	3	1	22	−21	0

(H) Hosts
1 October 2012
14:00

Republic of Ireland	3–0	Belarus
Connolly 27', 72'; O'Connor 80+3'	Report

City Stadium, Molodechno
Referee: Cristina Bujor (Romania)
1 October 2012
14:00

Finland	11–0	Georgia
Nuutinen 6', 35'; Front 15'; Björkskog 30', 56', 73', 80'; Tunturi 37', 70'; Kollanen 54'; Wentjärvi 77'	Report

Dinamo-Yuni Stadium, Minsk
Referee: Sabayel Gurbanova (Azerbaijan)

3 October 2012
14:00

Republic of Ireland	7–0	Georgia
Connolly 14'; Mccarthy 16'; Casserly 19', 71'; Mcgeough 23'; O'Connor 40+1'; Carroll 80+1'	Report

Torpedo Stadium, Minsk
Referee: Sabayel Gurbanova (Azerbaijan)
3 October 2012
14:00

Belarus	0–3	Finland
	Report	9' Björkskog; 64' Ahtinen; 65' Nuutinen

City Stadium, Molodechno
Referee: Ivana Vlaić (Bosnia and Herzegovina)

6 October 2012
14:00

Finland	1–2	Republic of Ireland
Tunturi 71'	Report	26' (o.g.) Laakso; 74' Frawley

Torpedo Stadium, Minsk
Referee: Cristina Bujor (Romania)
6 October 2012
14:00

Georgia	1–4	Belarus
Cheminava 54'	Report	3' Verholaytseva; 31' Duben; 76' Vasilyeva; 80+1' Gagakhova

City Stadium, Molodechno
Referee: Ivana Vlaić (Bosnia and Herzegovina)

=== Group 10 ===
Team	Pld	W	D	L	GF	GA	GD	Pts
Norway	3	3	0	0	18	1	+17	9
Turkey	3	2	0	1	4	5	−1	6
Wales	3	1	0	2	4	7	−3	3
Latvia (H)	3	0	0	3	0	13	−13	0

(H) Hosts
28 August 2012
12:00

Wales	0–2	Turkey
	Report	16' (pen.), 72' Topçu

Stadions Arkādija, Riga
Attendance: 50
Referee: Irina Gavrilova (Kazakhstan)
28 August 2012
18:00

Norway	8–0 (Match Forfeited)	Latvia
Cesilie Andreassen 2'; Sævik 11'; Markussen 17', 59' (pen.); Jensen 38', 40', 50'; Hansen 57'	Report

Stadions Arkādija, Riga
Attendance: 100
Referee: Nelli Stepanyan (Armenia)

30 August 2012
12:00

Norway	5–1	Turkey
Jensen 7', 44'; Hansen 18'; Markussen 20', 31'	Report	78' Topçu

Stadions Arkādija, Riga
Attendance: 50
Referee: Irina Gavrilova (Kazakhstan)
30 August 2012
18:00

Latvia	0–4	Wales
	Report	47' Revitt; 55' Young; 56', 80+2' Lloyd

Stadions Arkādija, Riga
Attendance: 100
Referee: Vivian Peeters (Netherlands)

2 September 2012
16:00

Wales	0–5	Norway
	Report	4' Markussen; 44', 45', 58' Jensen; 60' Cecilie Dekkerhus

Ogre Pilsētas Stadions, Ogre
Attendance: 100
Referee: Nelli Stepanyan (Armenia)
2 September 2012
16:00

Turkey	1–0	Latvia
Topçu 34'	Report

Stadions Arkādija, Riga
Attendance: 150
Referee: Vivian Peeters (Netherlands)

=== Group 11 ===
Team	Pld	W	D	L	GF	GA	GD	Pts
Spain	3	3	0	0	15	0	+15	9
Poland	3	2	0	1	7	3	+4	6
Slovakia (H)	3	1	0	2	4	9	−5	3
Faroe Islands	3	0	0	3	1	15	−14	0

(H) Hosts
3 September 2012
11:00

Spain	8–0	Faroe Islands
Esteban 12', 80+1'; Hernández 27', 37'; Garrote 28', 52'; Campo 55'; Caldentey 75'	Report

Štiavnický Stadion, Banská Bystrica
Referee: Kadriye Gökcek (Turkey)
3 September 2012
16:30

Poland	4–0	Slovakia
Konat 16'; Jaszek 36'; Zapała 71', 74'	Report

Štiavnický Stadion, Banská Bystrica
Referee: Iryna Petrova (Ukraine)

5 September 2012
11:00

Spain	4–0	Slovakia
Esteban 26', 27', 78'; García 80+1'	Report

Mestský štadión, Brezno
Referee: Iryna Petrova (Ukraine)
5 September 2012
16:30

Faroe Islands	0–3	Poland
	Report	63' Matysik; 67', 68' Pajor

Mestský štadión, Brezno
Referee: Tanja Subotič (Slovenia)

8 September 2012
11:00

Poland	0–3	Spain
	Report	12', 69' García; 60' Caldentey

TJ Sokol, Dolná Ždaňa
Referee: Kadriye Gökcek (Turkey)
8 September 2012
11:00

Slovakia	4–1	Faroe Islands
Čopíková 5', 11', 44', 80+3' (pen.)	Report	29' Johannesen

ŠK Kremnička, Kremnička
Referee: Tanja Subotič (Slovenia)

=== Ranking of runner-up teams ===
To determine the five best runners-up from the first qualifying round, only the results against the winners and third-placed teams in each group were taken into account.

The following criteria are applied to determine the rankings:

1. higher number of points obtained in these matches
2. superior goal difference from these matches
3. higher number of goals scored in these matches
4. fair play conduct of the teams in all group matches in the first qualifying round
5. drawing of lots

Grp	Team	Pld	W	D	L	GF	GA	GD	Pts
6	Austria	2	1	1	0	6	3	+3	4
1	Belgium	2	1	0	1	10	2	+8	3
2	Italy	2	1	0	1	4	2	+2	3
9	Finland	2	1	0	1	4	2	+2	3
11	Poland	2	1	0	1	4	3	+1	3
4	Iceland	2	1	0	1	3	2	+1	3
10	Turkey	2	1	0	1	3	5	−2	3
5	Serbia	2	1	0	1	3	8	−5	3
7	Russia	2	1	0	1	3	8	−5	3
8	Montenegro	2	1	0	1	1	15	−14	3
3	Hungary	2	0	1	1	3	8	−5	1

== Second round ==
=== Format ===
16 team are drawn into four groups of four. The teams then play each other once. After that only the group winners advance to the final tournament.

=== Seedings ===
The draw was held on 20 November 2012 in Nyon. Teams are seeded based on their first round performances. In the draw one team per pot will be drawn together.

Pot A	Pot B	Pot C	Pot D
Netherlands; France; Switzerland; Norway	Spain; Denmark; Republic of Ireland; Czech Republic	Sweden; Austria; Germany; Northern Ireland	Belgium; Finland; Italy; Poland

The hosts of the four one-venue mini-tournament groups are indicated below.

=== Group 1 ===
Group 1 was played in Belgium. Both matches in the final round was originally scheduled to be played simultaneously at 12 March 17:00, Denmark facing Netherlands in Tessenderlo and Belgium playing Germany in Tongeren, but due to heavy snow they were moved to the next day in Genk. Snowy weather however postponed them again in Genk. For the first time Belgium qualified to the final tournament. Also for the first time Germany missed out on qualifying.

Team	Pld	W	D	L	GF	GA	GD	Pts
Belgium (H)	3	1	2	0	4	1	+3	5
Denmark	3	1	2	0	5	4	+1	5
Germany	3	1	1	1	6	3	+3	4
Netherlands	3	0	1	2	3	10	−7	1

(H) Hosts
7 March 2013
16:00

Denmark	1–1	Belgium
Madsen 49'	Report	Aertsen 46'

KVV Thes Sport, Tessenderlo
Referee: Marta Frias Acedo (Spain)
7 March 2013
19:00

Netherlands	1–5	Germany
Van Gurp 22'	Report	Sehan 6', 46', 60'; Bremer 69', 78'

Mijnstadion, Beringen
Referee: Sarah Garratt (England)

9 March 2013
16:00

Germany	1–2	Denmark
Sehan 5'	Report	Hansen 65'; Kildemoes 74'

Eburons Dome Op De Keiberg, Tongeren
Referee: Ruzanna Petrosyan (Armenia)
9 March 2013
19:00

Netherlands	0–3	Belgium
	Report	Gelders 51', 74'; Maximus 80+2'

Mijnstadion, Beringen
Referee: Marta Frias Acedo (Spain)

3 April 2013
12:00

Belgium	0–0	Germany
	Report

Eburons Dome Op De Keiberg, Tongeren
Referee: Ruzanna Petrosyan(ARM)
3 April 2013

Denmark	2–2	Netherlands
Sørensen 3'; Thomsen 61'	Report	Strik 33'; Roord 80'

Mijnstadion, Beringen (BEL)
Referee: Sarah Garratt (ENG)

=== Group 2 ===
Group 2 was played in Austria. The last matchday was set to be played on 31 March 2013, but was cancelled due to heavy snowfalls. Matches were played on 14 April 2013.

Team	Pld	W	D	L	GF	GA	GD	Pts
Poland	3	2	1	0	6	2	+4	7
Norway	3	1	1	1	2	3	−1	4
Austria (H)	3	1	1	1	5	4	+1	4
Republic of Ireland	3	0	1	2	2	6	−4	1

(H) Hosts
27 March 2013
13:30

Republic of Ireland	1–2	Poland
O'Connor 80+4'	Report	Pajor 22'; Dudek 54'

Stadt Sportanlage, St. Pölten
Referee: Désirée Grundbacher (Switzerland)
27 March 2013
18:30

Norway	2–0	Austria
Jensen 35'; Andreassen 49'	Report

Wienerwaldstadion, Neulengbach
Referee: Sara Persson (Sweden)

29 March 2013
11:00

Norway	0–3	Poland
	Report	Pajor 18'; Jaszek 64'; Dudek 80+12'

Stadt Sportanlage, St. Pölten
Referee: Désirée Grundbacher (Switzerland)
29 March 2013
18:30

Austria	4–1	Republic of Ireland
Billa 16'; Dunst 32'; Knauseder 56'; Schwarzlmüller 70'	Report	Connolly 79' (pen.)

Wienerwaldstadion, Neulengbach
Referee: Ivana Vlaić (Bosnia and Herzegovina)

14 April 2013

Republic of Ireland	0–0	Norway

Stadt Sportanlage, St. Pölten
Referee: Sara Persson (Sweden)
14 April 2013

Poland	1–1	Austria
Jaszek 1'		Billa 50'

Wienerwaldstadion, Neulengbach
Referee: Ivana Vlaić (Bosnia and Herzegovina)

=== Group 3 ===
Group 3 was played in France.

Team	Pld	W	D	L	GF	GA	GD	Pts
Spain	3	2	1	0	6	1	+5	7
France (H)	3	2	1	0	6	2	+4	7
Northern Ireland	3	1	0	2	2	5	−3	3
Finland	3	0	0	3	0	6	−6	0

(H) Hosts
24 March 2013
16:00

France	3–1	Northern Ireland
Barbe 70'; Rougemont 72'; Gauvin 77'	Report	Mackin 11'

Stade du Merlo, Oullins
Referee: Sharon Sluyts (Belgium)
24 March 2013
18:00

Spain	3–0	Finland
García 22'; García Boa 40'; Falcón 48'	Report

Stade Troussier, Décines
Referee: Budimir Mladin (Croatia)

26 March 2013
16:00

France	2–0	Finland
Rougemont 11'; Gauvin 20'	Report

Stade du Merlo, Oullins
Referee: Budimir Mladin (Croatia)
26 March 2013
18:00

Northern Ireland	0–2	Spain
	Report	Guijarro 4'; García Boa 21'

Stade Troussier, Décines
Referee: Evgenia Kaskantiri (Greece)

29 March 2013
16:00

Spain	1–1	France
Caldentey 32' (pen.)	Report	Elisor 18'

Stade Troussier, Décines
Referee: Sharon Sluyts (Belgium)
29 March 2013
16:00

Finland	0–1	Northern Ireland
	Report	Feehan 41'

Stade du Merlo, Oullins
Referee: Evgenia Kaskantiri (Greece)

=== Group 4 ===
Group 4 was played in the Czech Republic.

Team	Pld	W	D	L	GF	GA	GD	Pts
Sweden	3	2	0	1	3	2	+1	6
Czech Republic (H)	3	1	1	1	5	4	+1	4
Italy	3	1	1	1	4	4	0	4
Switzerland	3	1	0	2	2	4	−2	3

(H) Hosts
9 April 2013
13:00

Switzerland	0–1	Sweden
	Report	Grabus 65'

Víceúcelová sportovní hala, Slaný
Referee: Florence Guillemin (France)
9 April 2013
16:00

Czech Republic	2–2	Italy
Daňková 32'; Svitková 58'	Report	Pittaccio 34'; Piemonte 79'

SK Roudnice nad Labem, Roudnice
Referee: Tania Fernandes Morais (Luxembourg)

11 April 2013
13:00

Sweden	2–1	Czech Republic
Oskarsson 9'; Angeldal 23'	Report	Kotková 46'

SK Roudnice nad Labem, Roudnice
Referee: Vivian Peeters (Netherlands)
11 April 2013
16:00

Switzerland	2–1	Italy
Stierli 53', 66'	Report	Pochero 4'

Stadion Prosek, Prague
Referee: Tania Fernandes Morais (Luxembourg)

14 April 2013
16:00

Czech Republic	2–0	Switzerland
Szewieczková 53', 59'	Report

Víceúcelová sportovní hala, Slaný
Referee: Florence Guillemin (France)
14 April 2013
16:00

Italy	1–0	Sweden
Goldoni 31'	Report

Stadion Prosek, Prague
Referee: Vivian Peeters (Netherlands)
