= 2010 Slovak Cup final =

- Event: 2009–10 Slovak Cup
Spartak Trnava	Slovan Bratislava
0	6
- Date: 11 May 2010
- Venue: Zemplin Stadium, Michalovce
- Referee: Mário Vlk
- Attendance: 3,752

The 2010 Slovak Cup final was the final match of the 2009–10 Slovak Cup, the 41st season of the top cup competition in Slovak football. The match was played at the Zemplin Stadium in Michalovce on 11 May 2010 between Spartak Trnava and Slovan Bratislava. Slovan Bratislava won after the match ended 6–0.

== Road to the final ==
FC Spartak Trnava		Round	ŠK Slovan Bratislava
Opponent	Result	2009–10 Slovak Cup	Opponent	Result
FK Rača	5–0	Second Round	MFK Vrbové	7–0
FC ViOn Zlaté Moravce	5−0	Third Round	MŠK Rimavská Sobota	2–1
MFK Petržalka	2–3 away, 3–0 home	Quarter-finals	Spartak Myjava	3–0 away, 0–0 home
FK DAC 1904 Dunajská Streda	1–0 away, 2–0 home	Semi-finals	FK Dukla Banská Bystrica	1–0 away, 1–0 home

== Match ==
=== Details ===
11 May 2010
16:30 CEST

Spartak Trnava	0–6	Slovan Bratislava
	Report	Saláta 11'; Božić 17'; Sylvestr 33'; Breznaník 64'; Guédé 67'; Dobrotka 87'

Zemplin Stadium, Michalovce
Attendance: 3,752
Referee: Mário Vlk

Spartak Trnava	Slovan Bratislava

SPARTAK TRNAVA:
GK	1	(Slovakia) Ján Slovenčiak
RB	16	(Slovakia) Miloš Juhász
CB	21	(Slovakia) Patrik Banovič	(yellow card) 45'	(substituted off) 68'
CB	9	(Slovakia) Vladimír Kožuch	(yellow card) 16'
LB	27	(Slovakia) Peter Schmidt	(yellow card) 22'
RM	6	(Slovakia) Roman Procházka
CM	14	(Slovakia) Kamil Kopúnek (c)
CM	28	(Brazil) Michel Neto	(substituted off) 21'
LM	29	(Slovakia) Martin Mikovič	(yellow card) 62'
FW	7	(Slovakia) Peter Štyvar	(substituted off) 46'
FW	24	(Slovakia) Martin Guldan
Substitutes:
DF	23	(Slovakia) Lukáš Hlavatovič	(substituted in) 68'
MF	26	(Slovakia) Igor Súkenník	(substituted in) 21'
FW	12	(Brazil) Pítio	(substituted in) 46'
Manager:
(Slovakia) Milan Malatinský

SLOVAN BRATISLAVA:
GK	30	(Slovakia) Matúš Putnocký
DF	6	(Slovakia) Martin Dobrotka
DF	2	(Slovakia) Kornel Saláta
DF	29	(Czech Republic) Radek Dosoudil
DF	28	(Slovakia) Marián Had
MF	11	(Bosnia and Herzegovina) Mario Božić	(substituted off) 53'
MF	19	(Togo) Karim Guédé
MF	12	(Slovakia) Branislav Obžera
MF	14	(Slovakia) Michal Breznaník (c)	(substituted off) 73'
FW	20	(Slovakia) Pavol Masaryk	(yellow card) 45'
FW	17	(Slovakia) Jakub Sylvestr	(substituted off) 81'
Substitutes:
MF	16	(Slovakia) Erik Grendel	(substituted in) 53'
FW	13	(Slovakia) Milan Ivana	(substituted in) 73'
FW	7	(Slovakia) Marek Kuzma	(substituted in) 81'
Manager:
(Slovakia) Dušan Tittel

Assistant referees:
(Slovakia) Ondre Brendza
(Slovakia) Erik Weiss
