= Alexander Moller =

Alexander Moller may refer to:

- Alex Möller (1903–1985), German politician (SPD)
- Alexander von Moller (1796–1862), Imperial Russian division commander
- Alexander Jackson Møller (born 1990), Danish football defender
