= Andre Marriner =

English football referee (born 1971)

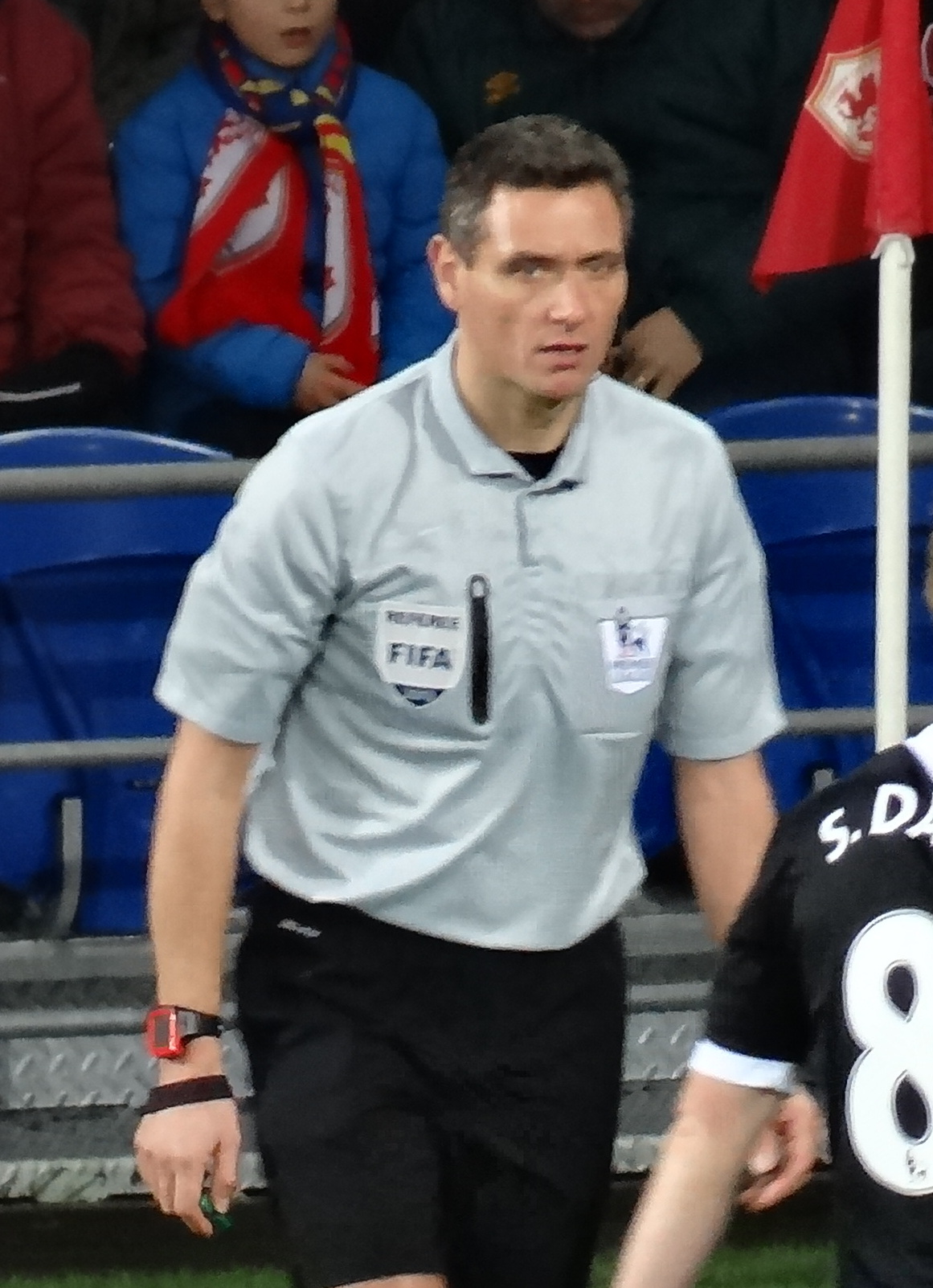
- Marriner in 2013
- Full name: Andre Marriner
- Born: 1 January 1971 (age 55); Birmingham, England

Domestic
Years	League	Role
1990s	Birmingham Amateur Football League	Referee
1990s	Southern Football League	Referee
2000–2003	The Football League	Assistant referee
2003–2005	The Football League	Referee
2005–2023	Premier League	Referee

International
Years	League	Role
2009–2017	FIFA listed	Referee (Category 1)

Andre Marriner (born 1 January 1971) is a retired English professional football referee based in Solihull, West Midlands. He is a member of the Birmingham County Football Association.

In 2005, Marriner was promoted to the list of Select Group Referees who officiate primarily in the Premier League. He also refereed for FIFA between 2009 & 2017. In May 2013 he took charge of the FA Cup final, the highest domestic honour for a referee in England. In May 2023, Marriner took charge of his final Premier League game between Arsenal and Wolves. He became a full-time VAR official from the 2023–24 season.

== Refereeing career ==
=== Early career ===
Marriner began refereeing in 1992, by chance when he was asked to cover for a referee who did not turn up for a local match, and progressed via the Birmingham Amateur Football League and the Southern Football League to become a Football League assistant referee in 2000.

He was appointed to the Football League list of referees in 2003, and he was given his first Premier League appointment on 13 November 2004, a 4–0 home win by Charlton Athletic over Norwich City.

=== Professional career ===
Marriner was promoted to the Select Group of professional referees in 2005. In the same year, he refereed the FA Youth Cup final between Southampton and Ipswich Town, with the latter winning 3–2.

He was appointed fourth official for the 2008 FA Community Shield match, which was won by Manchester United who defeated Portsmouth on penalties after a 0–0 draw in normal time. Peter Walton was the referee.

In December 2008 it was announced that Marriner, at the age of 37 and along with 26-year-old Stuart Attwell, would be invited to join FIFA's list of international referees for 2009. Marriner was called up to officiate at the elite qualification for the 2009 Euro Under-19s Championship, taking charge of Norway's 1–1 draw with Romania in Saint-Lô, and Romania's 3–0 defeat to France, also in Saint-Lô.

He was appointed to the 2010 Football League Championship play-off Final between Blackpool and Cardiff City at Wembley Stadium. Blackpool won the match 3–2, all five goals having been scored in the first half, securing the club's return to the Premier League for the first time since 1970. Marriner did not issue any cards during the match.

In a fixture between Arsenal and Liverpool in April 2011, Marriner notably awarded the latest-ever penalty kick in the history of the Premier League. The match was goalless until Marriner awarded Arsenal a penalty in the seventh minute of second-half stoppage time, and four minutes later awarded a second penalty to Liverpool. Both were converted, the latter in the 102nd minute which also became the League's latest-ever goal.

In May 2013 he refereed the FA Cup final between Manchester City and Wigan Athletic at Wembley Stadium. Marriner described the appointment as a "great honour". Wigan won the final 1–0, with a stoppage time goal from Ben Watson. Marriner dismissed City's Pablo Zabaleta six minutes from time for a second yellow card offence.

In March 2014, during Chelsea's 6–0 win over Arsenal, Marriner wrongly sent off Kieran Gibbs in the 15th minute, for a deliberate handball actually committed by Alex Oxlade-Chamberlain.

Marriner retired at the end of the 2022–23 season after a 23-year career.

== Statistics ==
Season	Games	Total (yellow card)	(yellow card) per game	Total (red card)	(red card) per game
2002–03	10	33	3.30	5	0.50
2003–04	27	70	2.59	8	0.30
2004–05	37	80	2.16	10	0.27
2005–06	28	76	2.71	7	0.25
2006–07	32	96	3.00	5	0.15
2007–08	37	112	3.02	6	0.16
2008–09	33	108	3.20	7	0.21
2009–10	37	115	3.11	10	0.27
2010–11	38	131	3.48	5	0.13
2011–12	28	92	3.29	5	0.18
2012–13	38	122	3.21	8	0.21
2013–14	36	110	3.06	13	0.36
2014–15	33	125	3.79	2	0.06
2015–16	35	120	3.43	5	0.14
2016–17	39	146	3.74	7	0.18
2017–18	35	97	2.77	5	0.14
2018–19	33	84	2.55	3	0.09
2019–20	27	71	2.63	2	0.07
2020–21	31	79	2.55	1	0.03
2021–22	28	90	3.21	3	0.10
2022–23	23	79	3.43	2	0.09

Statistics are available for all competitions. No records are available prior to 2002–03.
