= Oosterwolde, Friesland =

Oosterwolde
- Town
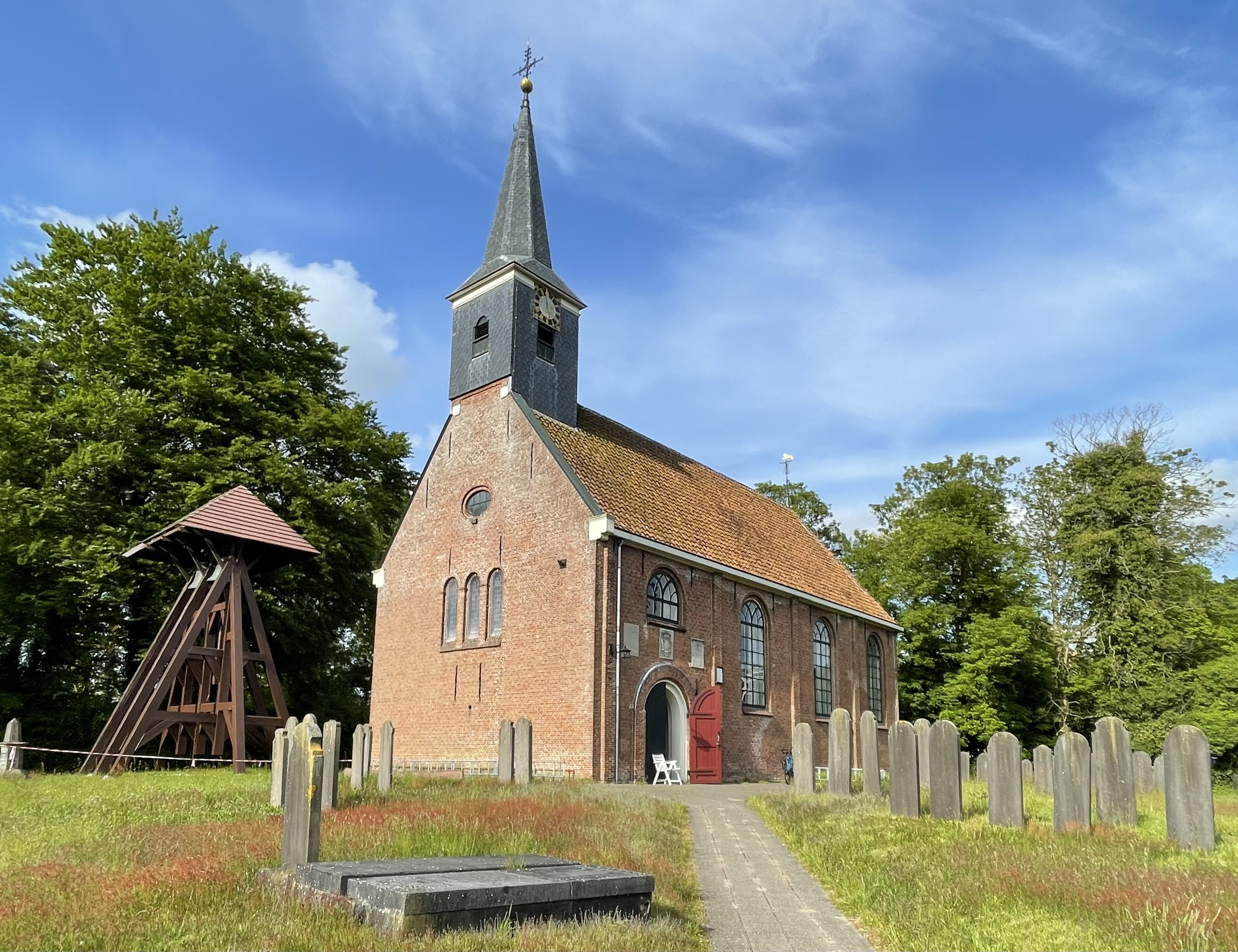
- Oosterwolde Church (1735)

- Flag

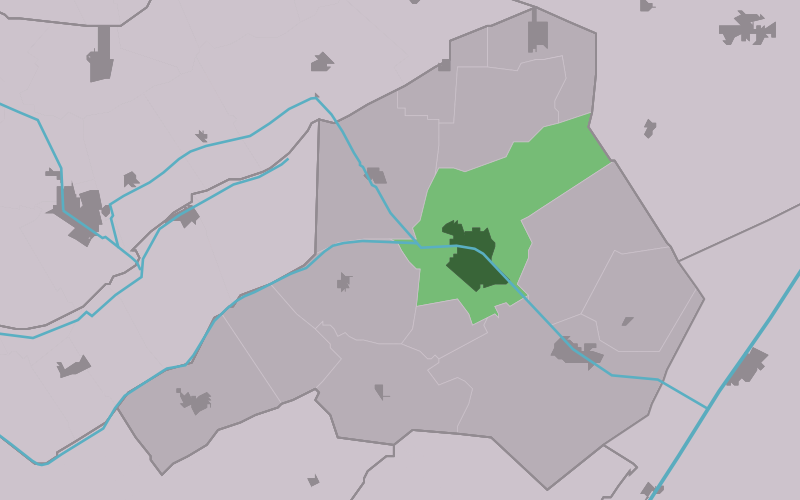
- Location in Ooststellingwerf municipality

- Location in the Netherlands Oosterwolde (Netherlands)
- Coordinates: 52°59′25″N 6°17′29″E
- Country: Netherlands
- Province: Friesland
- Municipality: Ooststellingwerf

Area
  - Total: 31.07 km^{2} (12.00 sq mi)
- Elevation: 7 m (23 ft)

Population (2021)
  - Total: 9,510
  - Density: 306/km^{2} (793/sq mi)
- Time zone: UTC+1 (CET)
  - Summer (DST): UTC+2 (CEST)
- Postal code: 8431
- Dialing code: 0516

Oosterwolde (West Frisian: Easterwâlde) is the largest town in the municipality of Ooststellingwerf in the south-east of Friesland, the Netherlands. It is located to east from Heerenveen, west from Assen, south-east from Drachten. Oosterwolde developed primarily along the Opsterlandse Compagnonsvaart canal in the 19th century, where most of the industry was located. Oosterwolde has served as a regional center since peat extraction began in the 19th century and therefore boasts a relatively large number of amenities and social services. It has 9,825 inhabitants (2023).

== History ==
The town was first mentioned between 1325 and 1336 as "tot Oesterwolde", and means eastern forest. The place name is thought to refer to its location east of a swamp forest (wold). Oosterwolde developed between two brinks (communal pastures).

Oosterwolde was home to 548 people in 1840. In 1886, Oosterwolde became the capital of the municipality of Ooststellingwerf. In 1887, Frico (nowadays: FrieslandCampina) opened a dairy factory in the village. The cooperative purchasing agency "Oosterwolde" opened factory in 1915 which is a combination of rational and Jugendstil architecture.

Oosterwolde was accessible by tram for a while. The route towards Makkinga, which served as the municipality's main town until 1885, can still be partially traced. The tram last ran in 1962, after which buses took over.

Oosterwolde was liberated from German occupation during World War II on 13 April 1945. Dertienaprilstraat owes its name to this. In the Thiesingabosje, in the hamlet of De Weper, there is a war memorial at a former execution site.

== Buildings ==
The Dutch Reformed church was built in 1735 as a replacement of a medieval church. It is currently (2023) used as a Bed & Breakfast, advertised as a "true pop-up experience between the pews!"

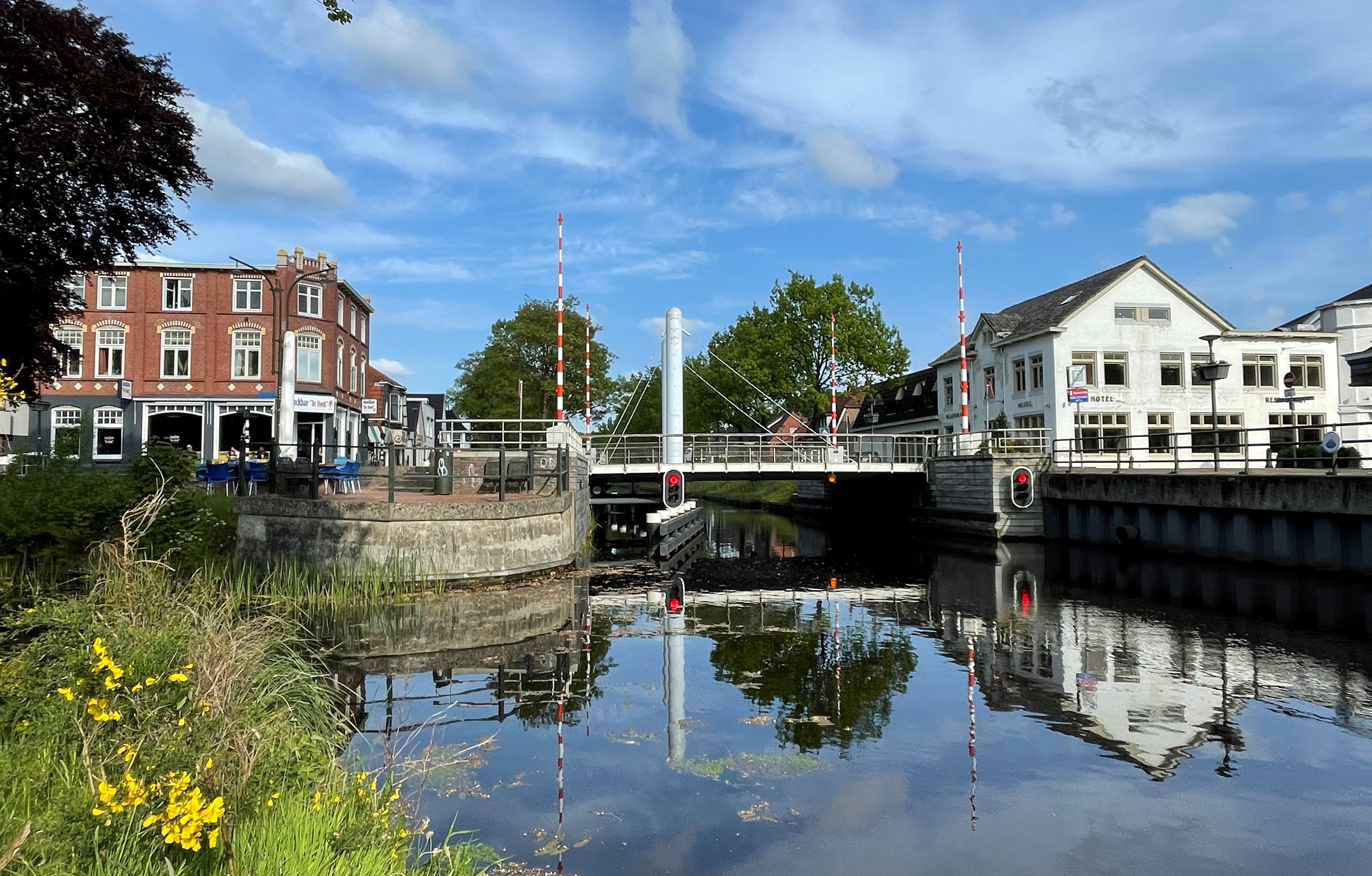
The Hoofdbrug bridge

Since 2010, Oosterwolde has had a unique bridge, the Hoofdbrug (Main Bridge), spanning the Opsterlandse Compagnonsvaart canal. It's a lifting bridge with only two pylons, made entirely of composite. Oosterwolde is currently the only place in the world with such a bridge.

The most striking attraction in Oosterwolde is the village church, dating from 1735. It also houses one of the only bell towers in Friesland.

== Language ==
The village is quadrilingual: besides Dutch (60% of the residents), Frisian (24%), and Stellingwerf dialect (14%), Malay (2%) is also spoken as the mother tongue by the Dutch-Moluccan residents.

== Gallery ==
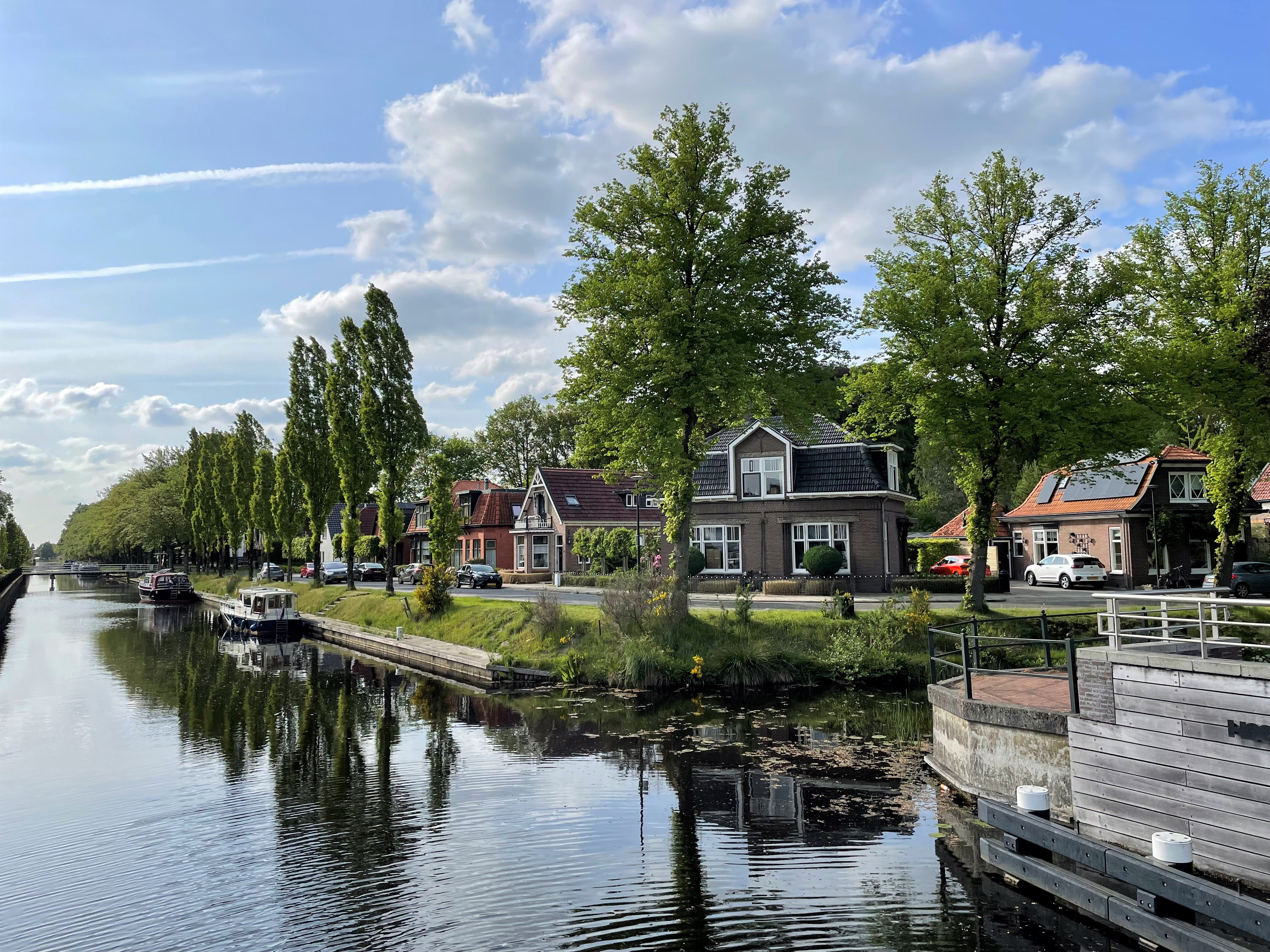
Canal view

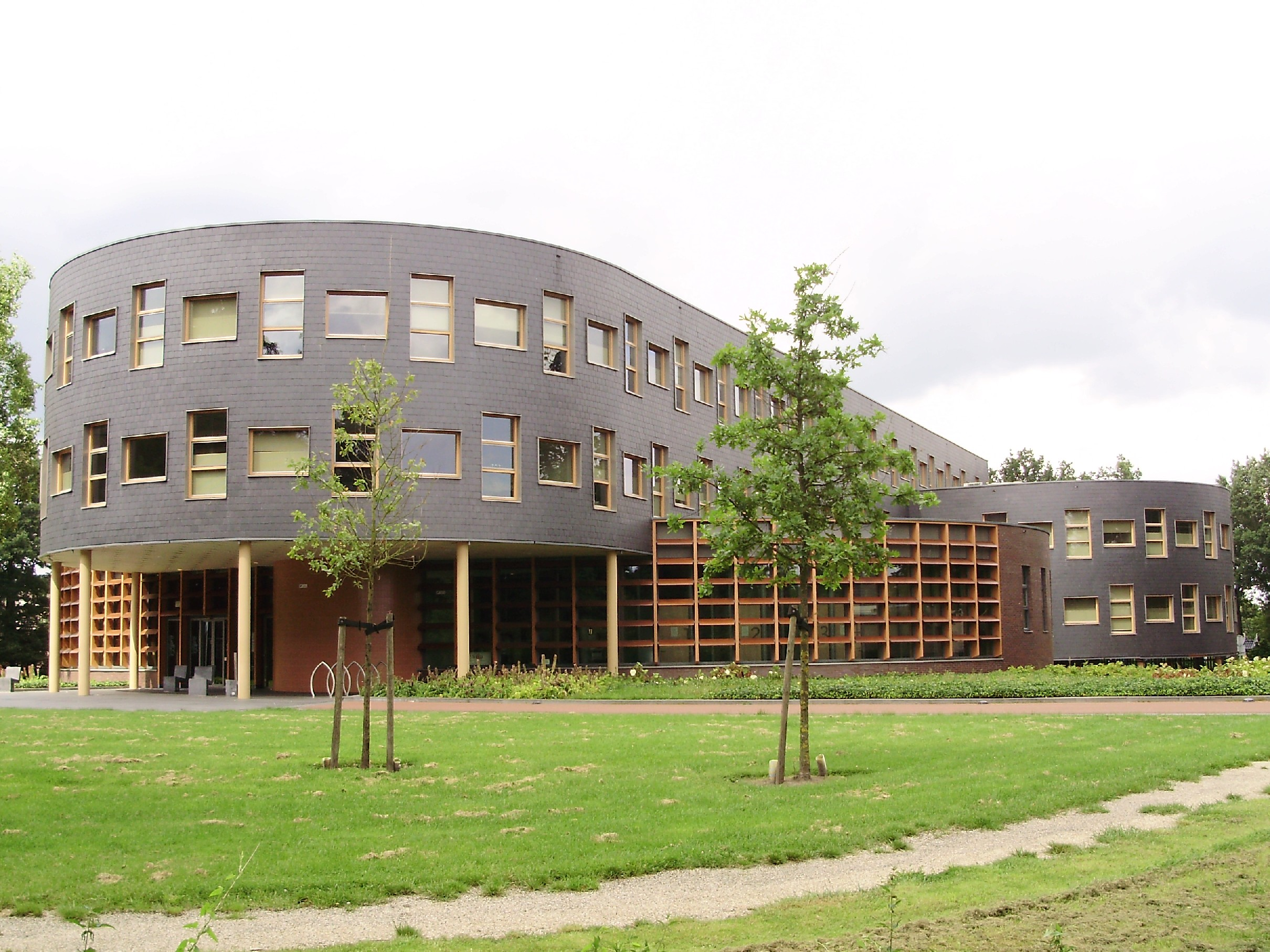
Town hall

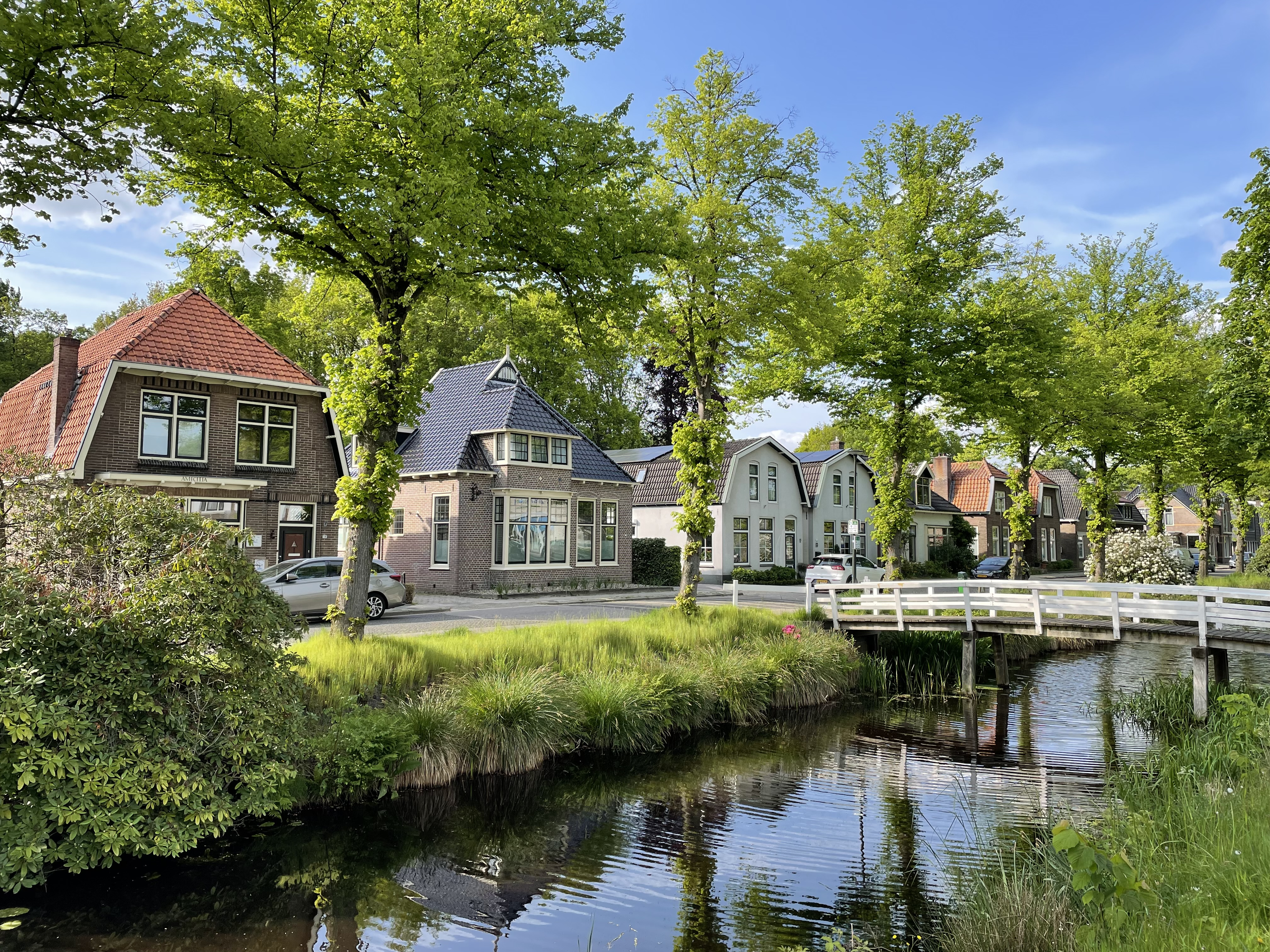
Spring in Oosterwolde
