= Chirri =

Spanish footballer

Personal information
- Full name: Carlos Monje Serrano
- Date of birth: 6 June 1990 (age 36)
- Place of birth: Mérida, Spain
- Height: 1.65 m (5 ft 5 in)
- Position: Forward

Team information
- Current team: Penya Encarnada
- Number: 7

Youth career
- Villarreal
- Mérida
- 2006–2008: Deportivo La Coruña

Senior career*
Years	Team	Apps	(Gls)
2008–2011	Deportivo B	60	(8)
2011–2012	Teruel	33	(2)
2012–2013	Arroyo	30	(0)
2013–2014	Xerez	9	(0)
2014	Cerceda	15	(3)
2014–2015	Lucena	9	(0)
2015	Pogoń Siedlce	10	(1)
2015–2016	Gavà	2	(1)
2016–2017	Jumilla	38	(2)
2017–2018	Lorca Deportiva	12	(4)
2018–2020	Leioa	45	(5)
2020–2022	Mérida	32	(1)
2022–2023	CE L'Hospitalet	9	(2)
2023–	Penya Encarnada	23	(8)

International career
2009	Spain U19	2	(1)
- * Club domestic league appearances and goals as of 27 May 2024

Carlos Monje Serrano (born 6 June 1990), commonly known as Chirri is a Spanish footballer who plays for Andorran Penya Encarnada as a forward.

== Club career ==
Born in Badajoz, Chirri arrived at the youth academy of Deportivo de La Coruña in 2006 from Mérida AD. He was promoted to the B-team in 2008. He scored his first goal for the club in the 85th minute of a 1–0 victory against Barakaldo CF.

On 19 July 2011, Chirri signed for CD Teruel but left after one season, when he moved to Arroyo. After representing Xerez and Cerceda in quick succession which played in Tercera División, he returned to the third tier with Lucena on 11 July 2014. His debut came on 24 August, when he featured in a 2–2 draw with Granada B.

On 16 January 2015, Chirri moved abroad and signed for Polish I liga club MKP Pogoń Siedlce. On 13 April, he scored his only goal for the club, netting the lone goal in a victory against Olimpia Grudziądz.

After having returned to Spain with CF Gavà in 2015, he switched to FC Jumilla after one season on 3 February 2016.

== International career ==
Chirri was shortlisted by manager Miguel Ángel Lotina for a Spain U19 squad that would play in a friendly tournament in Ireland. In following year, he scored a goal for the under 19 team against Estonia U19.

== Statistics ==
As of match played on 21 April 2018

Club	Season	League			Cup		Other		Total	
Club	Season	Division	Apps	Goals	Apps	Goals	Apps	Goals	Apps	Goals
Deportivo B	2008–09	Segunda División B	25	2	—		—		25	2
Deportivo B	2009–10	Tercera División	12	5	—		—		12	5
Deportivo B	2010–11	Segunda División B	23	1	—		—		23	1
Deportivo B	Total		60	8	—		—		60	8
Teruel	2011–12	Segunda División B	33	2	0	0	—		33	2
Arroyo	2012–13	Segunda División B	30	0	3	0	—		33	0
Xerez	2013–14	Tercera División	9	0	1	0	—		10	0
Cerceda	2013–14	Tercera División	15	3	0	0	2 (Note: Appearances in Promotion Play-offs)	0	17	3
Lucena	2014–15	Segunda División B	9	0	0	0	—		9	0
Pogoń Siedlce	2014–15	I liga	10	1	0	0	—		10	1
Gavà	2015–16	Tercera División	2	1	0	0	—		2	1
Jumilla	2015–16	Segunda División B	13	0	0	0	—		13	0
Jumilla	2016–17	Segunda División B	25	2	0	0	—		25	2
Jumilla	Total		38	2	0	0	—		38	2
Lorca Deportiva	2017–18	Segunda División B	12	4	0	0	—		12	4
Career total			218	21	4	0	2	0	224	21
