= Raphael Koch =

Swiss footballer (born 1990)

Personal information
- Full name: Raphael Koch
- Date of birth: 20 January 1990 (age 36)
- Place of birth: Emmen, Switzerland
- Height: 1.85 m (6 ft 1 in)
- Position: Defender

Team information
- Current team: FC Solothurn

Youth career
- 1997–2001: FC Biberist
- 2001–2007: FC Solothurn

Senior career*
Years	Team	Apps	(Gls)
2007–2009	FC Solothurn	50	(2)
2009–2015	FC Zurich	63	(2)
2016–	FC Solothurn		

International career
2011–	Switzerland U-21	6	(1)
- * Club domestic league appearances and goals as of 3 June 2015

Raphael Koch (born 20 January 1990) is a footballer from Switzerland who currently plays as a defender for FC Solothurn. He is the older brother of footballer Philippe Koch.
