= Cesilie Andreassen =

Norwegian association football player

Cecilia Andreassen
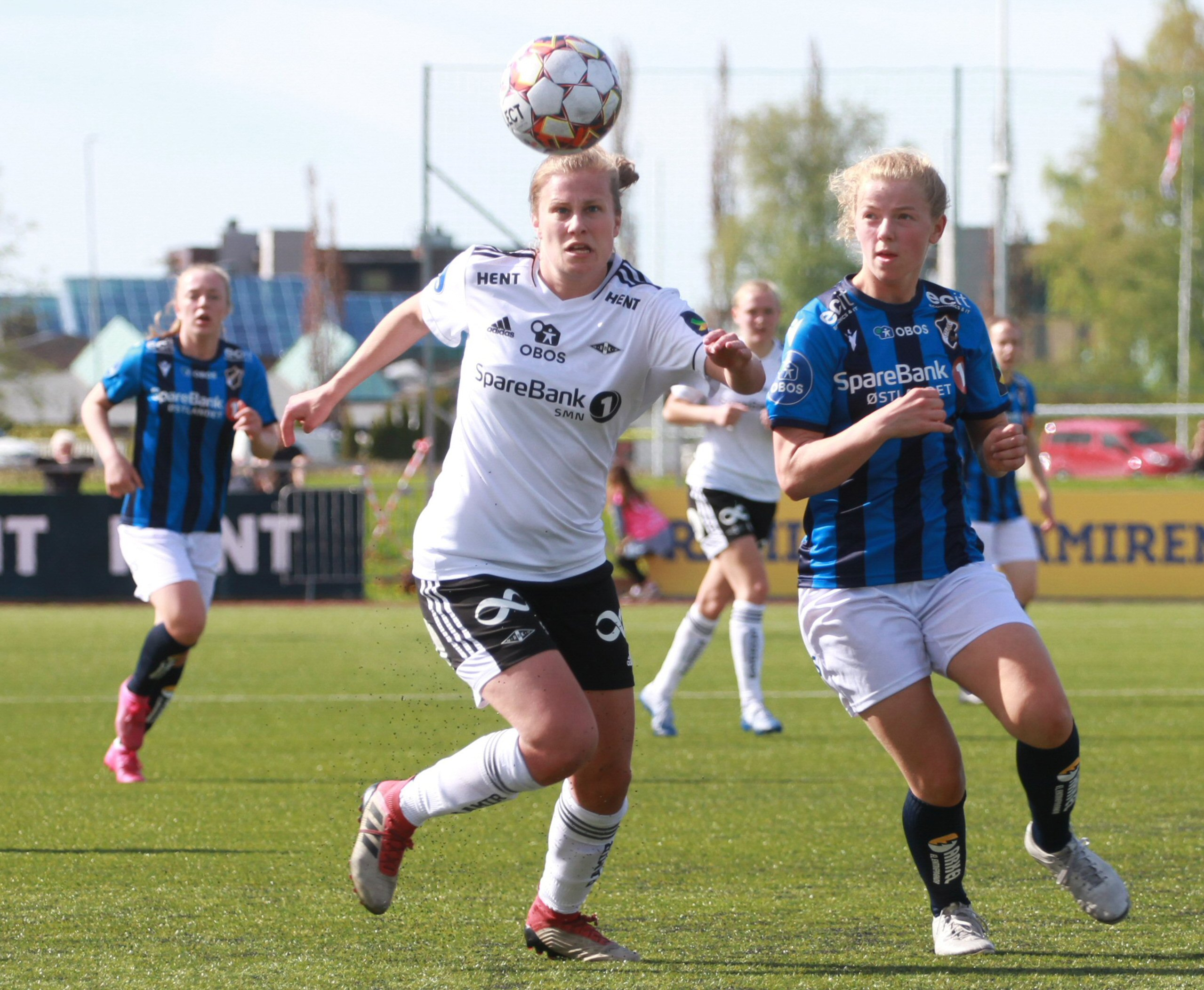
- Cesilie Andreassen (white shirt) for Rosenborg

Personal information
- Date of birth: October 13, 1996 (age 30)
- Place of birth: Svolvær
- Position: Midfielder

Team information
- Current team: Rosenborg
- Number: 5

Youth career
- –2012: Svolvær

Senior career*
Years	Team	Apps	(Gls)
2013–2016	Medkila	69	(6)
2017–	Rosenborg	133	(25)

International career^{‡}
2011	Norway U15	2	(0)
2012	Norway U16	7	(2)
2013	Norway U17	5	(1)
2013–2015	Norway U19	10	(1)
2023–	Norway	3	(1)
- * Club domestic league appearances and goals ‡ National team caps and goals as of 6 November 2023

Cesilie Andreassen (born October 13, 1996) is a Norwegian footballer from Svolvær in Lofoten, who plays for Rosenborg in the Toppserien and the Norway national team.

== Club career ==
She played age-specific football in Svolvær IL before going to Medkila in the Toppserien in 2013. On 22 April 2013, she debuted in the Toppserien with a 4–1 win over Sandviken.

Before the 2016 season, she was named captain of Medkila at the age of 19.

In 2017, she signed for the then Trondheims-Ørn. Before the 2020 season, the club changed its name to Rosenborg, and Andreassen was named best of the field in the historic first match in the Toppserien as Rosenborg against LSK Kvinner.

== International career ==
She has international matches for the U15, U16, U17, and U19 national teams for Norway. She debuted for the senior Norway national team in April 2023.

== International goals ==
No.	Date	Venue	Opponent	Score	Result	Competition
1.	6 April 2023	Estadi Municipal de Can Misses, Ibiza, Spain	Spain	2–4	2–4	Friendly

== Honours ==
=== Club ===
Rosenborg

- Norwegian Cup: 2023
