= Michel Cury =

Brazilian footballer

Personal information
- Full name: Michel Cury Neto
- Date of birth: July 24, 1981 (age 45)
- Place of birth: Divinópolis, Brazil
- Height: 1.85 m (6 ft 1 in)
- Position: Midfielder

Team information
- Current team: Sertaozinho
- Number: 10

Youth career
- Cruzeiro

Senior career*
Years	Team	Apps	(Gls)
- Cruzeiro
- América Mineiro
- Académica Coimbra
- → SL Nelas (loan)
- → CD Tondela (loan)
2007	Rio Branco de Andradas		
2007	Fast Clube		
2008	América de Natal		
2008	Gama		
2008–2009	Uberaba		
2009–2010	Spartak Trnava	21	(4)
2011	Tupi		
2011–	Araxá		
2012	→ Tupi (loan)	9	(0)
- * Club domestic league appearances and goals as of 5 June 2013

Michel Cury Neto (born 24 July 1981) is a Brazilian football midfielder who currently plays for Araxá.

He started his career in Cruzeiro Esporte Clube, where he played together with Maicon and Luisão. He played one season for FC Spartak Trnava in the Slovak Super Liga.
