= Elisabeth Mayr =

Austrian footballer

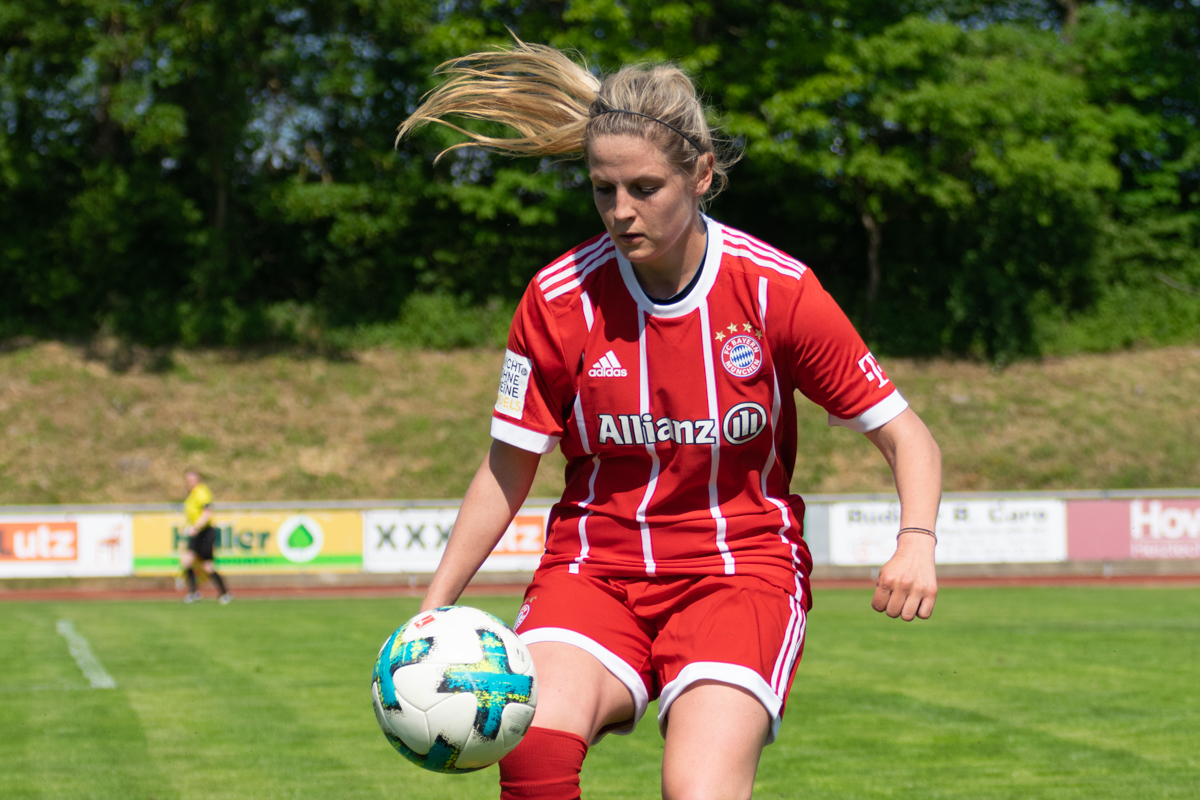
- Mayr in 2018

Personal information
- Date of birth: 18 January 1996 (age 30)
- Place of birth: Munich, Germany
- Height: 1.70 m (5 ft 7 in)
- Position: Forward

Youth career
- Bayern Munich

College career
Years	Team	Apps	(Gls)
2014–2015	Kansas Jayhawks	19	(1)

Senior career*
Years	Team	Apps	(Gls)
2013–2018	Bayern Munich II	66	(30)
2018–2019	Bayer Leverkusen	23	(5)
2019–2021	Basel	48	(12)

International career^{‡}
2012–2013	Germany U17	5	(3)
2019–2021	Austria	8	(0)
- * Club domestic league appearances and goals as of 30 July 2023 ‡ National team caps and goals as of 30 July 2023

Elisabeth “Eli” Mayr (born 18 January 1996) is a retired footballer who played as a forward for Swiss Nationalliga A club FC Basel. Born in Germany, she represented the Austria national team internationally.

== Early life ==
Mayr was raised in Brunnthal.
