= Milica Vulić =

Montenegrin footballer

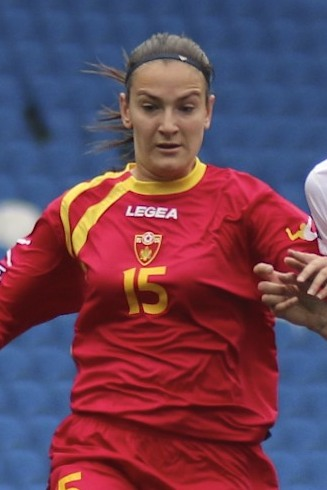
- Vulić in 2014

Personal information
- Date of birth: 27 January 1996 (age 30)
- Position: Midfielder

Team information
- Current team: KF Vllaznia Shkodër

Senior career*
Years	Team	Apps	(Gls)
- KF Vllaznia Shkodër

International career^{‡}
- Montenegro
- * Club domestic league appearances and goals as of 19:22, 30 August 2019 (UTC) ‡ National team caps and goals as of 19:22, 30 August 2019 (UTC)

Milica Vulić (Serbian Cyrillic: Милица Вулић; born 27 January 1996) is a Montenegrin footballer who plays as a midfielder and has appeared for the Montenegro women's national team.

== Career ==
Vulić has been capped for the Montenegro national team, appearing for the team during the 2019 FIFA Women's World Cup qualifying cycle.
