= Ján Slovenčiak =

Slovak footballer

Personal information
- Date of birth: 5 November 1981 (age 44)
- Place of birth: Tornaľa, Czechoslovakia
- Height: 1.93 m (6 ft 4 in)
- Position: Goalkeeper

Team information
- Current team: SDM Domino

Youth career
- 1991–1995: FK Tornaľa
- 1995–2000: MŠK Rimavská Sobota

Senior career*
Years	Team	Apps	(Gls)
2000–2004	Rimavská Sobota	2	(0)
2003	→ Inter Bratislava (loan)		
2005–2007	Senec	19	(0)
2008–2009	Mouscron	6	(0)
2010–2011	Spartak Trnava	11	(0)
2012–	Domino		
- * Club domestic league appearances and goals as of 21 August 2012

Ján Slovenčiak (born 5 November 1981) is a Slovak football goalkeeper who currently plays for SDM Domino.

He joined FC Spartak Trnava in January 2010.
