= Mijnstadion =

Multi-use stadium in Beringen, Belgium

Coordinates: 51°04′28″N 5°13′05″E

Mijnstadion is a multi-use stadium in Beringen, Belgium. It has been used mostly for football matches as the home ground of K. Beringen-Heusden-Zolder, until the club reached the first division in 2003–04. At this time the club moved to the Fenix Stadion of rival club K.R.C. Genk. After one season at the top level of Belgian football, the club was relegated to the second division and moved back to Mijnstadion. In April 2006 Beringen-Heusden-Zolder went into liquidation. Since then, the stadium is no longer used by any professional football club and is used by young teams of the area.

The stadium holds 9,416 people.
