= Alexander Jackson Møller =

Danish footballer (born 1990)

Personal information
- Full name: Alexander Jackson Møller
- Date of birth: 21 January 1990 (age 36)
- Place of birth: Højbjerg, Denmark
- Height: 1.82 m (5 ft 11 1/2 in)
- Position: Centre back

Team information
- Current team: B1908

Youth career
- AGF

Senior career*
Years	Team	Apps	(Gls)
2009–2011	AGF	3	(0)
2011	Hobro IK	4	(0)
2011–2012	Aarhus Fremad		(0)
2012	BÍ/Bolungarvík	6	(0)
2012–2015	Aarhus Fremad		
2015	BÍ/Bolungarvík	8	(0)
2016–	B1908	0	(0)

International career
2006	Denmark U16	2	(0)
2006–2007	Denmark U17	7	(0)
2007–2008	Denmark U18	5	(0)
2008–2009	Denmark U19	12	(3)
2009–2010	Denmark U20	3	(0)
- * Club domestic league appearances and goals as of 20 January 2016

Alexander Jackson Møller (born 21 January 1990) is a Danish professional footballer who plays as a defender who plays for B1908.
