= Martin Guldan =

Slovak footballer

Personal information
- Full name: Martin Guldan
- Date of birth: 3 September 1990 (age 36)
- Place of birth: Trnava, Czechoslovakia
- Height: 1.85 m (6 ft 1 in)
- Position: Striker

Team information
- Current team: SC Volksbank Marchegg
- Number: 7

Youth career
- Spartak Trnava

Senior career*
Years	Team	Apps	(Gls)
2007–2012	Spartak Trnava	34	(7)
2009	→ Lučenec (loan)		
2012	→ ŠKF Sereď (loan)	13	(0)
2012–	SC Volksbank Marchegg	11	(1)

International career^{‡}
2008–2009	Slovakia U-19	11	(4)
2010	Slovakia U-21	1	(0)
- * Club domestic league appearances and goals as of 12 July 2012 ‡ National team caps and goals as of 24 November 2010

Martin Guldan (born 3 September 1990) is a Slovak football striker who currently plays for SC Volksbank Marchegg.

In February 2008, he was on trial in U.S. Lecce.
