= History of the Albania national football team =

Football team history

The history of the Albania national football team dates from the team's formation and first ever international match in 1946.

== History ==
=== 1930–45: Founding and early years ===
Although it never played any matches, the Albania national football team existed before the Albanian Football Association (FSHF) was created in 1930. This is evinced by the registration of the Albanian team in the 1929–31 Balkan Cup a year before the creation of the FSHF. The FSHF was founded on 6 June 1930, and two years later, Albania joined FIFA. It was in 1946 that Albania hosted its first international match, against Yugoslavia. In 1954, Albania was one of the founding members of UEFA.

=== 1946: Champion of the Balkans ===
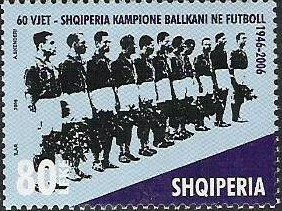
Stamps of Albania in 2006. The Albania squad that won the 1946 Balkan Cup.

The early years saw a notably successful Balkan Cup run in 1946. Albania won their group over favourites Yugoslavia by earning a better goal difference. After defeating Bulgaria 3–1 in the semifinal, Albania won the tournament by defeating Romania 1–0 in the final. Albania initially wasn't expected to participate in the tournament, but the withdrawal of Greece offered Albania a chance to join in the re-established post-war cup.

=== 1958–68: Among the Top 16 Teams on the Continent ===
Albania did not participate in qualifiers for the 1960 European Nations' Cup. Four years later, Albania competed in 1964 European Nations' Cup qualification for the first time, earning forfeit victories against Greece in the opening ties, earning them a place in the Round of 16. Albania drew Denmark in the next round, losing 4–0 in the first leg and winning the second leg 1–0 thanks to an early goal from Panajot Pano despite that, ending their cup run with a 4–1 aggregate defeat. At the end of the tournament Albania ranked 9th in Europe for the first and only time in its history. Also Winning three Matches in their debut campaign.

Albania took part in the qualifiers for the 1966 World Cup in England, with Northern Ireland, Netherlands and Switzerland drawn in their group. Albania's only point in the group came from a 1–1 home draw to Northern Ireland in Tirana, which denied Northern Ireland a place in the Finals.

In UEFA Euro 1968 qualification, Albania had a 0–0 home draw with West Germany that denied the Germans participation in the final tournament.

=== 1964–72 Albania participating in Football at the Summer Olympics qualifying tournaments ===
Albania participated in Olympic qualifying for the first time in 1964. The Albanians faced Bulgaria in the opening round, losing both matches 1–0 and failing to qualify for the next round. It wasn't until the 1972 Summer Olympics held in Munich that Albania made another attempt to qualify. Facing Romania in the opening round, they lost both legs 2–1, despite goals from Medin Zhega and Panajot Pano, respectively.

=== 1980–84: Return to competitions and nearly Qualified for the World Cup in Mexico in 1986 ===
After six years of virtually no international matches, Albania managed to return to international football, participating in the 1982 FIFA World Cup qualification. In Group 1, Albania managed to end above last place, which Finland got instead. They only win came in September 1980 against Finland thanks to the goals of Sefedin Braho and Millan Baçi.

In the 1984 European Championship qualifiers, Albania finished in last place in their group of five teams. In 8 matches, Albania got 2 points, with 2 draws, 6 losses, and no wins. On the other hand, Albania had some impressive results against bigger teams. They lost 0–1 away to Turkey with the goal being scored in the 86th minute. In the next two games, Albania tied Northern Ireland to a scoreless draw and lost 1–2 to Germany, both at home. In the last three matches, Albania tied Turkey in the Qemal Stafa Stadium and lost 2–1 to Austria in Tirana. The last game of the competition was an away game to Germany. After 22 minutes, Albania led 0–1 with a goal by Genc Tomorri. However, they were tied one minute later, and after Genc Tomorri was sent off by the referee after a simulation of Rudi Völler, Albania had to play one man down for 60 minutes. Eventually Albania lost 2–1 with the last goal being scored in the 79th minute.

In the 1986 FIFA World Cup qualification Albania would face in this qualification Belgium, Poland and their rivals Greece. In the first match they faced Belgium in Brussels. The Albanians lost with 3-1 despite the equalizer from Bedri Omuri in the 71st minute. Albania would face away from home against Poland in the Stadion Stali Mielec. They drew the result through goals from Bedri Omuri and even the leading goal from Agustin Kola with 2-1 but at the end Poland scored again. Albania missing out on their first win, in this qualification. After that Albania famously beat Belgium at home with 2–0 in the Qemal Stafa Stadium. The goals were scored by Mirel Josa and Arben Minga securing Albania their first and only win in this qualification. As Albania loss their next two games against Greece away with 2-0 and against Poland at home close with 0–1. Missing out close to qualify for the 1986 FIFA World Cup. In their last match they faced Greece at home in Tirana. They go in front by a goal from Bedri Omuri but they couldn't hold on as Greece equalized the result in the 54th minute. At the end playing a 1–1 draw. Despite finishing their campaign with four points in the third place. Albania came close to qualify as they nearly beat every opponent in this Group. It was their most successful FIFA World Cup qualification in the history of Albania.

=== 1991–99: Transition years ===
Albania managed to get impressive results against Germany during this campaign with Germany winning both matches only by 2–1 and the winner coming only in the last minutes. Albania finished in last place with 2 wins, 2 draws and 6 losses having worse head-to-head results against Wales. However, Albania beat (Moldova) away in an international qualifying tournament for the first time.

In the 1998 World Cup, Albania was drawn in a 6-team group which included Germany, Portugal, Ukraine, Northern Ireland and Armenia, Albania finished last with 4 points, but showed some respective results against the bigger teams. Their two matches with Germany saw them lose 2–3 at neutral ground and 3–4 in Hannover, taking the lead in both games. Albania got a 1–0 win against Northern Ireland and a 1–1 tie against Armenia.

In a relatively easy group, Albania only won once at home against Georgia. However, they memorably drew Greece 0–0 at home, Norway 2–2 and Latvia 0–0 (both away). Albania also drew Latvia 3–3 at home. All the other matches were narrowly lost.

=== 2000–05: Failed qualifying campaigns ===
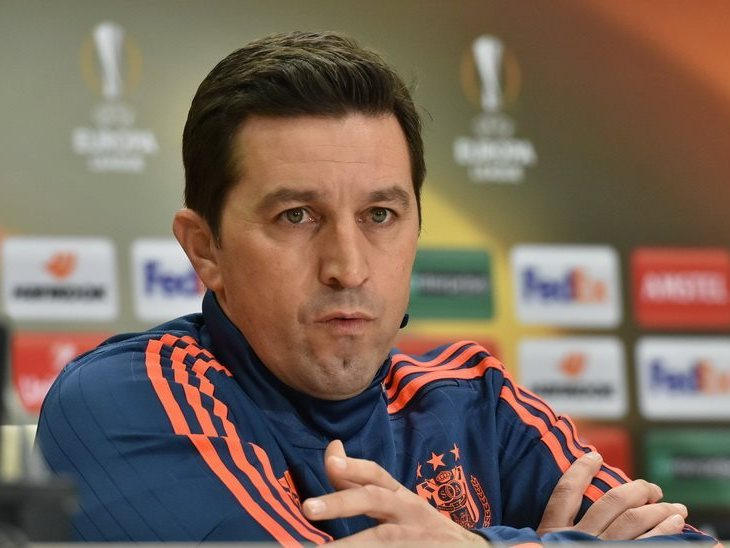
Besnik Hasi (pictured here in 2016), was one of the first Kosovo Albanians to play for the national team. He is considered by Albanian media as the man who "united" Kosovo and Albania.

After a loss to Finland, Albania won over Greece 2–0 with an own goal and a late goal of Ervin Fakaj. However, after that win, another 6 losses followed for Albania, which brought the Albanian Football Federation to think about hiring a foreign coach, 33 years after the last foreign coach, Luznikov, had led Albania in a Moscow tournament in 1959.

After a poor start in which Albania would draw at home against Switzerland with 1–1 by a goal from Edvin Murati but lose in the next match away against Russia with 4-1 despite an earlier equalizer scored by Klodian Duro Albania sacked his manager Giuseppe Dossena to replace him with German Hans-Peter Briegel for the following match against Russia in the Loro Boriçi Stadium in Shkodër. In which the Albanians won deservedly with 3-1 through goals from Altin Rraklli, Altin Lala and Igli Tare to secure Hans-Peter Briegel in his debut match, as a manager his maiden win for Albania. He led Albania to an undefeated run at home matches by drawing against Republic of Ireland 0–0 and beating in the last match Georgia 3–1 by goals from Besnik Hasi, Igli Tare and striker Alban Bushi. Despite the good results, Albania finished the group in the penultimate spot with eight points. Away Albania couldn't score any points, but managed to score 4 goals. Missing close out to the Playoffs stage by six points.

Two months after Greece beat Portugal to win the European Championship, Albania defeated Greece 2–1 at home by two quick goals from Edvin Murati and Adrian Aliaj, denting the Greeks' possibility to qualify. As the Albanians leading for the table for the first time in a qualification after this match. Albania went on to disappoint by losing to Georgia away and Denmark at home, before returning to winning ways by beating Kazakhstan 0–1 with a goal from Alban Bushi. Then, Albania played Ukraine, Turkey, and Greece, losing all three matches. Later Albania beat Georgia 3–2 by two goals from Igli Tare and one from Ervin Skela as well as beating Kazakhstan with 2–1 by goals from Florian Myrtaj and striker Erjon Bogdani. The last positive result for Albania in this qualification would be a 2–2 away draw with Ukraine where Bogdani scoring two surprising goals. At the end, Albania got 13 points, and four wins in their best result then. They surpassed for the first time in the history two nation's in the qualifying standings.

=== 2006–10: Disappointing results under Barić and Haan ===
In the matches for the 2008 European qualifiers campaign, Albania have managed very good results as well as good team play in some matches compared to previous times. They started with a 2–2 away draw to Belarus, two wins against Luxembourg home and away (2–0, 3–0) and a 0–0 draw away to Bulgaria. They had two good matches against the Netherlands in both legs, although controversial refereeing caused the matches to end up in two losses (2–1, 0–1). Other setbacks included a 0–0 draw against Slovenia and a 0–2 loss to Romania, both at home. Albania's hopes of qualifying mathematically ended when they failed to win over Slovenia away and managed another 0–0 draw. In the penultimate match at home against Bulgaria, Albania played wonderfully, but ended up in a very unlucky draw. After going ahead, they conceded in the dying minutes and later missed a penalty. In the last match at home, Albania was hugely disappointing, losing 2–4 against Belarus. Contrary to the popular belief that this would be the easiest match during the campaign, Albania not only missed a chance to break the points-record of all competitions but also produced a very lethargic performance in a rainy night. Albania's Euro campaign ended with a disastrous 6–1 away loss to Romania, which eventually resulted in the resignation of the coach Otto Barić and his assistant.

In December 2007, Football Association of Albania's president, Armand Duka, announced Arie Haan would replace Croatian-Austrian Otto Barić as Albania's head coach. Haan signed a two-year contract on 4 January 2008. On 14 March 2008, Albania was suspended from international football (FIFA and UEFA), due to heavy political interference in the Football Association. The suspension lasted 46 days.

With Haan as coach Albania started 2010 FIFA World Cup qualification with a 0–0 draw against Sweden at home. Four days later, the Albanians defeated Malta 3–0 with goals from Erjon Bogdani, Armend Dallku and Klodian Duro. On 11 October 2008, Albania lost 2–0 to Hungary in Budapest and then surprisingly drew 0–0 with Portugal in Braga. On 11 February 2009, Albania drew with Malta in Ta'Qali 0–0. Albania then lost 1–0 to Hungary at home on 28 March 2009 and 3–0 to Denmark in Copenhagen on 1 April 2009. In the home match against Portugal, Hugo Almeida scored early for Portugal, before Albania equalised with a goal from Erjon Bogdani. However, with just a few seconds left in the game, Bruno Alves scored the winner for Portugal, eliminating Albania. At the end of the campaign, Albania drew 1–1 against Denmark and lost 4–1 to Sweden. Haan was replaced by Croatian coach Josip Kuže in May 2009.

=== 2011–13: Revival under De Biasi ===
Josip Kuže parted ways with Albania three years and a half after he started the job, and in December 2011, Italian coach Gianni De Biasi replaced him. Albania started the qualifiers well, notably defeating Cyprus with 3–1 by goals from Armando Sadiku, Edgar Çani and Erjon Bogdani as well as beating Slovenia at home with 1–0 by a goal from Odise Roshi. which was followed by an unprecedent away win at Norway in Oslo after a stunning goal from Hamdi Salihi. Albania would also draw against Norway at home despite leading the match with a goal from Valdet Rama, this match ending in a 1–1 draw. The team was at one point 2nd with 6 matches played and 4 to spare, but failed to be successful in the last four, losing away in Slovenia and Iceland, as well at home against Switzerland, and drawing in Cyprus. With De Biasi, the Albania national team reached an unprecedented high number of players, who although are ethnically Albanian, were not born in Albania, but either in Kosovo, or outside of Kosovo, while hailing from Kosovo Albania parents. In 2011–13, 14 Albanians of Kosovo origin were either part of the start-up team, or had received recent call-ups.

=== 2014–16: Success at the European Championship ===
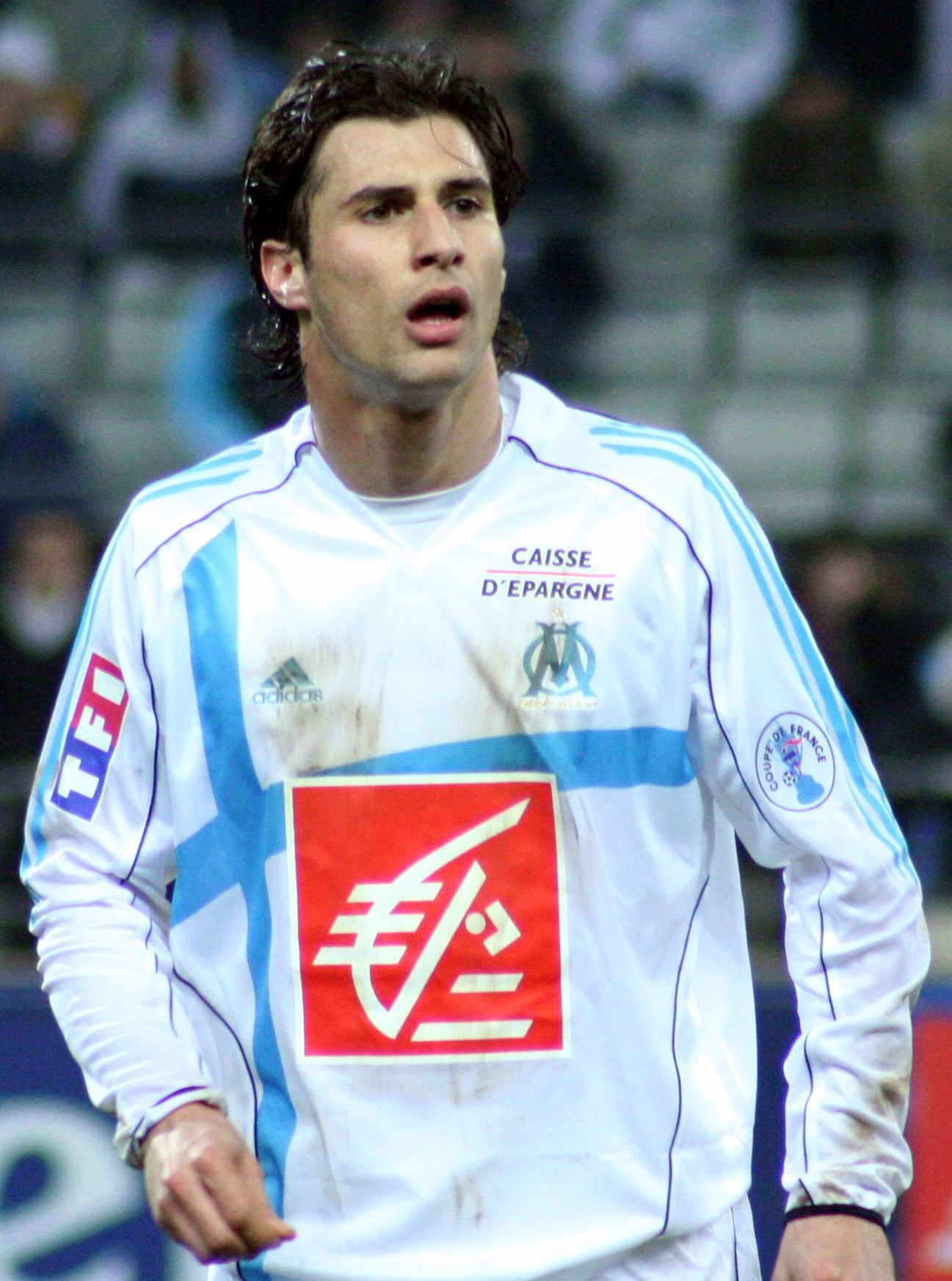
Lorik Cana is the most capped player in the history of the national team with 93 caps; he overtook Altin Lala in 2014 and is seen by many as the symbol of Albanians and the national team.

The qualifying draw took place on 23 February 2014. Albania was drawn in Group I along with Portugal, Denmark, Serbia, and Armenia. Qualifying matches started in September 2014. Albania started the qualifiers with a historic result as they beat group favourites Portugal 1–0 away thanks to a goal from Bekim Balaj. In the second match against Denmark at the newly renovated Elbasan Arena, Albania was on lead until the 82nd minute where Lasse Vibe equalized, with the match ending 1–1.In the next game against Serbia at Partizan Stadium, the match was abandoned in 42nd minute after several on and off the field incidents. Despite the violence by Serbia's hooligans against Albania at Partizan Stadium, Serbia was awarded the 3–0 victory after the decision by UEFA. The decision was appealed by both Serbia and Albania, but the decision was upheld by UEFA. Both associations then filed further appeals to the Court of Arbitration for Sport, and on 10 July 2015 the Court of Arbitration for Sport rejected the appeal filed by the Serbian FA, and upholds in part the appeal filed by the Albanian FA, meaning the match is deemed to have been forfeited by Serbia with 0–3 and they are still deducted three points. In the fourth match against Armenia at home, Albania were behind from the 4th minute after an own goal from Mërgim Mavraj, but Mavraj equalized in the 77th minute with a powerful header. Four minutes later Shkëlzen Gashi scored the winner, putting Albania in the 2nd position along with Denmark with 10 points. It was the first time that Albania ended the first part of the qualifiers in the second spot. Albania made history again by beating one-time world champions and UEFA Euro 2016 hosts France at the Elbasan Arena in the "Group I" friendly match to a Freekick goal from Ergys Kaçe. After an unlucky draw against Denmark in Kopenhagen, Albania clinched at least a play-off place. Albania lost their next two Matches; conceding goals in the last minute to Portugal 0-1 and to Serbia 0–2 in the derby in Elbasan Arena. Albania than defeated Armenia 0–3 in Yerevan thanks to an early own goal followed by a header in the 23rd minute by Berat Djimsiti and a late strike from Armando Sadiku, the Albanians than qualified for the UEFA Euro 2016 ending a 50 year hiatus appearance at a major men's football tournament. This team achievement was commemorated by Albania's President Bujar Nishani bestowing the Honor of Nation Order. Additionally at the tournament, Albania would achieved a world record regarding not conceding any away goals, while scoring seven away goals.

==== UEFA Euro 2016 qualifying Group I standings ====
Pos	Team	Pld	W	D	L	GF	GA	GD	Pts	Qualification
1	Portugal	8	7	0	1	11	5	+6	21	Qualify for final tournament
2	Albania	8	4	2	2	10	5	+5	14	Qualify for final tournament
3	Denmark	8	3	3	2	8	5	+3	12	Advance to play-offs
4	Serbia (Note: The Serbia v Albania match was awarded as a 3–0 win to Albania, and Serbia were also deducted three points, after the match was abandoned at 0–0 because home fans invaded the pitch and attacked Albania players when a drone carried a pro-Albanian flag over the stadium.)	8	2	1	5	8	13	−5	4	
5	Armenia	8	0	2	6	5	14	−9	2	

Source: UEFA
Rules for classification: Qualification tiebreakers
Notes:

The Serbia–Albania match success would be celebrated by the team receiving additional awards of honor and recognition by the cities of Tirana, Vlore, Kamëz, and Bajram Curri as national symbols pride. A parade was held in Tirana.

=== Albania's UEFA Euro 2016 Team ===
Manager: Gianni De Biasi

Albania named their final squad on 31 May.

No.	Pos.	Player	Date of birth (age)	Caps	Goals	Club
1	GK	Etrit Berisha	10 March 1989 (aged 27)	35	0	(Italian Football Federation) Lazio
2	DF	Andi Lila	12 February 1986 (aged 30)	58	0	(Hellenic Football Federation) PAS Giannina
3	MF	Ermir Lenjani	5 August 1989 (aged 26)	19	3	(French Football Federation) Nantes
4	DF	Elseid Hysaj	2 February 1994 (aged 22)	20	0	(Italian Football Federation) Napoli
5	DF	Lorik Cana (captain)	27 June 1983 (aged 32)	91	1	(French Football Federation) Nantes
6	DF	Frédéric Veseli	20 November 1992 (aged 23)	3	0	(Swiss Football Association) Lugano
7	DF	Ansi Agolli	11 November 1982 (aged 33)	61	2	(Association of Football Federations of Azerbaijan) Qarabağ
8	MF	Migjen Basha	5 January 1987 (aged 29)	19	3	(Italian Football Federation) Como
9	MF	Ledian Memushaj	7 December 1986 (aged 29)	14	0	(Italian Football Federation) Pescara
10	FW	Armando Sadiku	27 May 1991 (aged 25)	20	5	(Liechtenstein Football Association) Vaduz
11	FW	Shkëlzen Gashi	15 July 1988 (aged 27)	14	1	(United States Soccer Federation) Colorado Rapids
12	GK	Orges Shehi	25 September 1977 (aged 38)	7	0	(Albanian Football Federation) Skënderbeu Korçë
13	MF	Burim Kukeli	16 January 1984 (aged 32)	15	0	(Swiss Football Association) Zürich
14	MF	Taulant Xhaka	28 March 1991 (aged 25)	12	0	(Swiss Football Association) Basel
15	DF	Mërgim Mavraj	9 June 1986 (aged 30)	26	3	(German Football Association) 1. FC Köln
16	FW	Sokol Cikalleshi	27 July 1990 (aged 25)	19	2	(Turkish Football Federation) İstanbul Başakşehir
17	DF	Naser Aliji	27 December 1993 (aged 22)	5	0	(Swiss Football Association) Basel
18	DF	Arlind Ajeti	25 September 1993 (aged 22)	10	1	(Italian Football Federation) Frosinone
19	FW	Bekim Balaj	11 January 1991 (aged 25)	15	1	(Croatian Football Federation) Rijeka
20	MF	Ergys Kaçe	8 July 1993 (aged 22)	16	2	(Hellenic Football Federation) PAOK
21	MF	Odise Roshi	21 May 1991 (aged 25)	32	1	(Croatian Football Federation) Rijeka
22	MF	Amir Abrashi	27 March 1990 (aged 26)	18	0	(German Football Association) SC Freiburg
23	GK	Alban Hoxha	23 November 1987 (aged 28)	1	0	(Albanian Football Federation) Partizani

=== Group A of the UEFA European Championship 2016 in France ===
Albania were drawn in Group A, against the hosts France,Switzerland and Romania. Albania lost their opening game against Switzerland 1-0 due to an early header in the 5th Minute from Fabian Schär. Despite being one man down to a Red Card for Lorik Cana Albania held its ground as they came close to an equalizer when Shkëlzen Gashi missed a sitter before goalie Yann Sommer. In the following match they lost 2–0 to the hosts France despite a close fought match being able to defend against the favourites until the last minutes conceding two goals from Dimitri Payet and Griezmann. While they beat in the third Group match Romania 1–0 by a header scored from Armando Sadiku before halftime, securing Albania's first ever win in a UEFA European Championship. The team finished last among the third-placed teams and were eliminated in the group stage. Finishing their first campaign UEFA European Championship in the 18th place.

=== Albania vs Switzerland ===
11 June 2016
15:00

Albania	0–1	Switzerland
	Report	Schär 5'

Stade Bollaert-Delelis, Lens
Attendance: 33,805
Referee: Carlos Velasco Carballo (Spain)

Albania	Switzerland

GK	1	Etrit Berisha
RB	4	Elseid Hysaj
CB	5	Lorik Cana (c)	(yellow card) 23' (yellow-red card) 36'
CB	15	Mërgim Mavraj	(yellow card) 90+2'
LB	7	Ansi Agolli
RM	22	Amir Abrashi
CM	13	Burim Kukeli	(yellow card) 89'
LM	14	Taulant Xhaka		(substituted off) 62'
RW	21	Odise Roshi		(substituted off) 74'
LW	3	Ermir Lenjani
CF	10	Armando Sadiku		(substituted off) 82'
Substitutions:
MF	20	Ergys Kaçe	(yellow card) 63'	(substituted on) 62'
FW	16	Sokol Cikalleshi		(substituted on) 74'
FW	11	Shkëlzen Gashi		(substituted on) 82'
Manager:
(Italy) Gianni De Biasi

GK	1	Yann Sommer
RB	2	Stephan Lichtsteiner (c)
CB	22	Fabian Schär	(yellow card) 14'
CB	20	Johan Djourou
LB	13	Ricardo Rodríguez
CM	11	Valon Behrami	(yellow card) 66'
CM	10	Granit Xhaka
RW	23	Xherdan Shaqiri		(substituted off) 88'
AM	15	Blerim Džemaili		(substituted off) 76'
LW	18	Admir Mehmedi		(substituted off) 62'
CF	9	Haris Seferovic
Substitutions:
FW	7	Breel Embolo		(substituted on) 62'
MF	8	Fabian Frei		(substituted on) 76'
MF	16	Gelson Fernandes		(substituted on) 88'
Manager:
Vladimir Petković

=== France vs Albania ===
15 June 2016
21:00

France	2–0	Albania
Griezmann 90'; Payet 90+6'	Report

Stade Vélodrome, Marseille
Attendance: 63,670
Referee: Willie Collum (Scotland)

France	Albania

GK	1	Hugo Lloris (c)
RB	19	Bacary Sagna
CB	4	Adil Rami
CB	21	Laurent Koscielny
LB	3	Patrice Evra
CM	5	N'Golo Kanté	(yellow card) 88'
CM	14	Blaise Matuidi
RW	20	Kingsley Coman		(substituted off) 68'
AM	8	Dimitri Payet
LW	11	Anthony Martial		(substituted off) 46'
CF	9	Olivier Giroud		(substituted off) 77'
Substitutions:
MF	15	Paul Pogba		(substituted on) 46'
FW	7	Antoine Griezmann		(substituted on) 68'
FW	10	André-Pierre Gignac		(substituted on) 77'
Manager:
Didier Deschamps

GK	1	Etrit Berisha
RB	4	Elseid Hysaj
CB	18	Arlind Ajeti		(substituted off) 85'
CB	15	Mërgim Mavraj
LB	7	Ansi Agolli (c)
DM	13	Burim Kukeli	(yellow card) 55'	(substituted off) 74'
CM	22	Amir Abrashi	(yellow card) 81'
CM	9	Ledian Memushaj
RW	2	Andi Lila		(substituted off) 71'
LW	3	Ermir Lenjani
CF	10	Armando Sadiku
Substitutions:
MF	21	Odise Roshi		(substituted on) 71'
MF	14	Taulant Xhaka		(substituted on) 74'
DF	6	Frédéric Veseli		(substituted on) 85'
Manager:
(Italy) Gianni De Biasi

=== Romania vs Albania ===
19 June 2016
21:00

Romania	0–1	Albania
	Report	Sadiku 43'

Parc Olympique Lyonnais, Décines-Charpieu
Attendance: 49,752
Referee: Pavel Královec (Czech Republic)

Romania	Albania

GK	12	Ciprian Tătărușanu
RB	22	Cristian Săpunaru	(yellow card) 85'
CB	21	Dragoș Grigore
CB	6	Vlad Chiricheș (c)
LB	2	Alexandru Mățel	(yellow card) 54'
CM	18	Andrei Prepeliță		(substituted off) 46'
CM	5	Ovidiu Hoban
RW	20	Adrian Popa		(substituted off) 68'
AM	10	Nicolae Stanciu
LW	19	Bogdan Stancu
CF	9	Denis Alibec		(substituted off) 57'
Substitutions:
MF	17	Lucian Sânmărtean		(substituted on) 46'
MF	11	Gabriel Torje	(yellow card) 90+3'	(substituted on) 57'
FW	14	Florin Andone		(substituted on) 68'
Manager:
Anghel Iordănescu

GK	1	Etrit Berisha
RB	4	Elseid Hysaj	(yellow card) 90+4'
CB	18	Arlind Ajeti
CB	15	Mërgim Mavraj
LB	7	Ansi Agolli (c)
DM	8	Migjen Basha	(yellow card) 6'	(substituted off) 83'
CM	22	Amir Abrashi
CM	9	Ledian Memushaj	(yellow card) 85'
RW	2	Andi Lila
LW	3	Ermir Lenjani		(substituted off) 77'
CF	10	Armando Sadiku		(substituted off) 59'
Substitutions:
FW	19	Bekim Balaj		(substituted on) 59'
MF	21	Odise Roshi		(substituted on) 77'
DF	5	Lorik Cana		(substituted on) 83'
Manager:
(Italy) Gianni De Biasi

Man of the Match:
Arlind Ajeti (Albania)

=== UEFA Euro 2016 Group A Standings ===
Pos	Team	Pld	W	D	L	GF	GA	GD	Pts	Qualification
1	France (H)	3	2	1	0	4	1	+3	7	Advance to knockout stage
2	Switzerland	3	1	2	0	2	1	+1	5	Advance to knockout stage
3	Albania	3	1	0	2	1	3	−2	3	
4	Romania	3	0	1	2	2	4	−2	1	

Source: UEFA
Rules for classification: Group stage tiebreakers
(H) Hosts

=== 2016–2022: Post European Championship ===
Despite the UEFA European Championship's almost successful debut, Albania suffered massive setback. In 2018 World Cup qualification, Albania had been thrown into a tough group composing Spain and Italy. Albania, despite its passionate play, failed to reach the World Cup, falling to both Italy and Spain as well as a shocking 0–3 loss to Israel at home. During this era, their successful manager, Gianni De Biasi, resigned and Christian Panucci, another Italian, replaced him as coach of Albania. The situation however did not improve significantly. Albania played poorly in the 2018–19 UEFA Nations League, winning only to Israel 1–0 and lost the remaining three, especially the devastating 0–4 defeat to Scotland at home. Panucci would be sacked after a 0–2 defeat to Turkey in the opening campaign for the UEFA Euro 2020 qualifying. Another Italian, Edoardo Reja, was appointed to help Albania to improve in a tough group, but improvement is still very little. The Albanian side continued to slump, suffering a 0–1 loss away to Iceland before managed to gain its second win against Moldova 2–0. Reja would lead Albania in their encounter against world champions France in Paris, where the Albanians suffered a devastating 1–4 loss, the match was also marred with controversy after Andorran anthem was mistakenly played instead of Albanian one. After the defeat, Albania managed one of its biggest feat in their qualification, beating 2018 World Cup participant Iceland 4–2 at home soil to keep the team on track. Despite this outcome, Albania's trip to Turkey became a nightmare, when the Albanians, despite its passionate display, lost 0–1 in final minutes because of defensive mistake, thus losing every chance to qualify for the UEFA Euro 2020. In the next match, Albania won comfortably 4–0 versus Moldova at Zimbru Stadium, achieving the fourth win in group; by doing so, Albania set two records: it was the biggest away win in competitive matches and the first time in history that Albania has scored three goals in the first half in competitive matches and second time overall, though it was not enough to prevent Albania from elimination.

=== Resurgence under Sylvinho (2022–present) ===
Following their narrow failure to qualify for the 2022 FIFA World Cup in Qatar, where Albania finished third in Group I, Albania began a new cycle under head coach Sylvinho. In the UEFA Euro 2024 qualifying Group E campaign, they were drawn alongside the Czech Republic, Poland, Faroe Islands and Moldova. The team finished unbeaten with a record of five wins and three draws, conceding few goals and securing first place in the group. This achievement ensured qualification for the UEFA Euro 2024, marking only their second appearance in the UEFA European Championship.

At UEFA Euro 2024, Albania were drawn into a "group of death" alongside the Spain, Italy and Croatia, all of whom were former European or World Cup winners or finalists. Albania showed competitive performances throughout the tournament, notably earning a 2–2 draw against Croatia, while narrowly losing to Italy and suffering defeat to Spain. With one point from three matches (one draw and two losses), the team finished fourth in the group, scoring and conceding multiple goals, and were eliminated in the group stage.

Following the European Championship, Albania competed in the 2024–25 UEFA Nations League B, where they were relegated to League C after finishing in the lower positions of their group.

Albania then participated in the 2026 FIFA World Cup qualification, competing in Group K. The team recorded several positive results, including victories without conceding and multiple draws, which allowed them to secure a place in the play-offs for the first time in their history.

In the play-off match held on 26 March 2026 against the Poland, Albania initially took the lead and created several scoring opportunities, including a notable missed chance by Nedim Bajrami in the second half. However, they conceded twice and lost 2–1, resulting in elimination and ending their hopes of qualifying for their first FIFA World Cup.
