= Triumph (2017 film) =

2017 film

- Directed by: Kreshnik Jonuzi; Luftar Von Rama; Charlie Askew
- Written by: Kreshnik Jonuzi; Luftar Von Rama
- Produced by: Kreshnik Jonuzi; Luftar Von Rama; Charlie Askew; Lejla Korca; Murat Mela
- Starring: Lorik Cana; Gianni De Biasi; Paolo Tramezzani; Mërgim Mavraj
- Cinematography: Charlie Askew
- Edited by: Luftar Von Rama; Kreshnik Jonuzi
- Music by: Aldo Shllaku
- Release date: 19 October 2017 (Warsaw)
- Running time: 87 minutes
- Country: USA
- Languages: Albanian; English; Italian

Triumph (Albanian: Triumf) is a 2017 sports documentary film directed by Kreshnik Jonuzi, Luftar Von Rama, and Charlie Askew. Funding for the film came from Albanian Americans. It premiered at the 2017 Warsaw Film Festival.

== Plot ==
On October 14, 2014 the two Eastern European countries of Albania and Serbia faced off on the soccer field in the Serbian capital of Belgrade. With Albanian fans not permitted to attend the game due to purported safety concerns, the stadium full of Serbian fans echoed racist chants and death threats. Tensions rose to a boil when a drone carrying an Albanian flag flew above the players and onto the pitch. Angered fans rushed the field, attacking the Albanian players, forcing the match to end. A history of political tensions, war and genocide is explored as we follow the journey of the Albania national team to their first EURO cup appearance.

== Cast ==
- Lorik Cana
- Gianni De Biasi
- Paolo Tramezzani
- Mërgim Mavraj
- Dritan Shakohoxha
- Blendi Fevziu
- Shkëlzen Gashi
- Jermaine Jones
- Herolind Shala

== Production ==
Battle in the Balkans was the initial title for the film, but it was retitled to Triumph after the Serbia v Albania football match in October 2014. Charlie Askew, Kreshnik Jonuzi, and Luftar Von Rama directed the film. This was Jonuzi's debut feature film as a director. Askew did the cinematography. Jonuzi and Luftar Von Rama were the editors. Michael Gandsey composed the music. Albanian communities in the United States donated to the production.

== Release ==
Triumph premiered at the Warsaw Film Festival on 19 October 2017, and was shown at Dokufest. It was shown at the American Documentary Film Festival and Film Fund in Palm Springs, California, on 29 March 2019.

== Awards ==
| Award | Category | Result | Ref. |
|---|---|---|---|
| Warsaw Film Festival | Documentary Competition | Nominated | |

== See also ==
- Albania national football team
- Serbia v Albania (UEFA Euro 2016 qualifying)

== Works cited ==
=== News ===
- "Documentary "Triumph" competes at a festival in California". Insajderi. 12 March 2019. Archived from the original on 17 June 2025.
- "Drone in Belgrade, "Triumph" debuts in Poland". Koha. 9 October 2017. Archived from the original on 17 June 2025.
- "Droni në Beograd, "makthi" kthehet në një f". Koha. 11 October 2017. Archived from the original on 17 June 2025.
- "Së shpejti dokumentari "Triumph", për dronin në Beograd dhe heroizmin e Ballist Morinës". Telegrafi. 2017.

=== Web ===
- "Belonging". Tirana International Film Festival. Archived from the original on 17 June 2025.
- "Triumph". Dokufest. Archived from the original on 17 June 2025.
- Morina, Die (9 October 2017). "Triumph". Balkan Insight. Archived from the original on 17 June 2025.
