= Serbia v Albania (UEFA Euro 2016 qualifying) =

Serbia v Albania (2014)
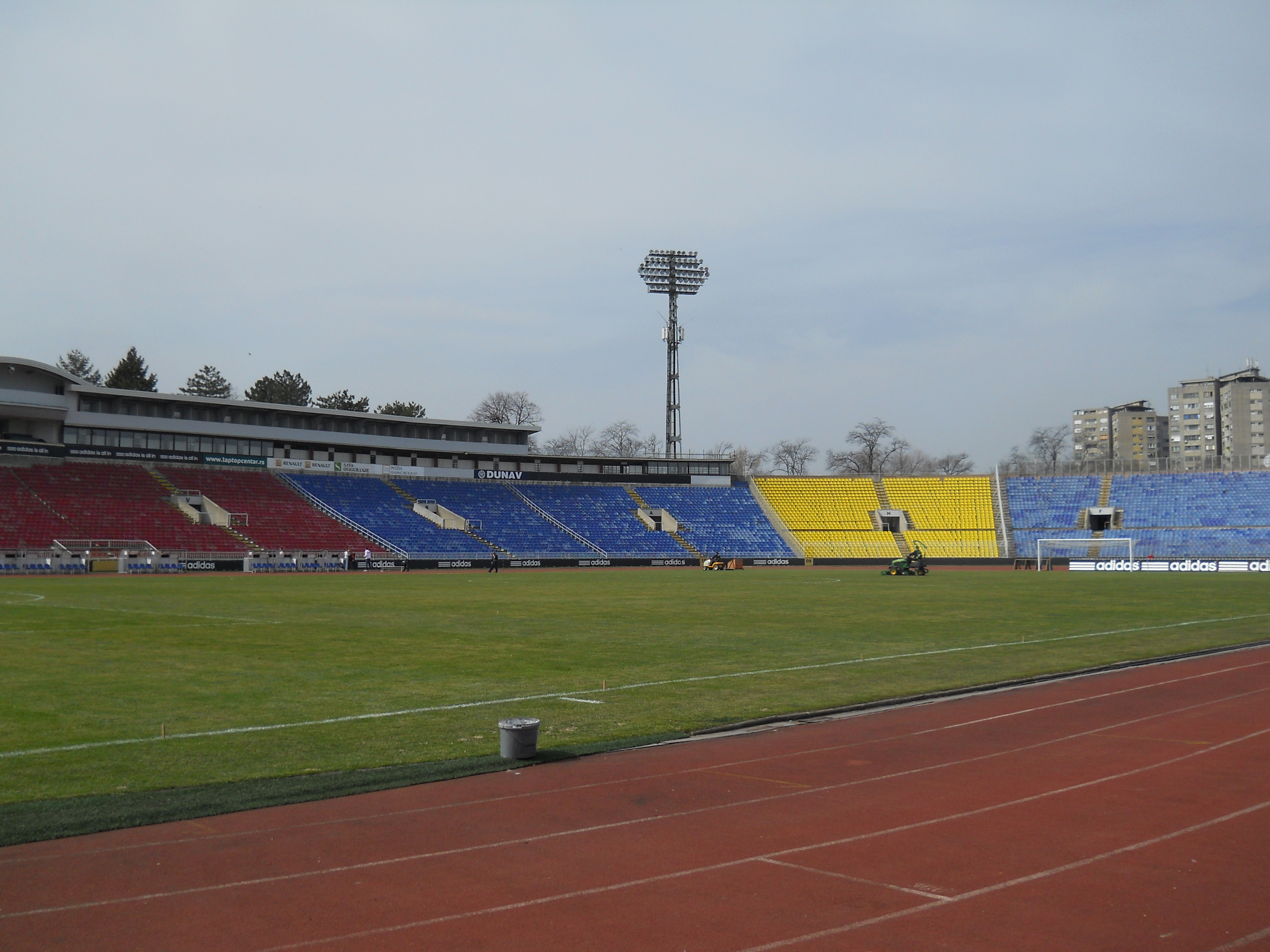
- The Partizan Stadium in Belgrade hosted the match
- Event: UEFA Euro 2016 qualifying Group I Matchday 3
Serbia	Albania
0	3
- Match abandoned at 0–0 after 42 minutes Albania awarded 3–0 victory (Note: The Serbia v Albania match was abandoned with the score at 0–0 in the 42nd minute after "various incidents", which resulted in the Albania players refusing to return to the field. UEFA ruled that Albania had forfeited the match and awarded a 3–0 win to Serbia, and deducted three points from Serbia for their involvement in the events. Serbia were ordered next two home qualifying games behind closed doors, and both Serbia and Albania were fined €100,000. The decision was appealed by both Serbia and Albania to UEFA, but the decision was upheld. Both associations then filed further appeals to the Court of Arbitration for Sport, and on 10 July 2015, the Court of Arbitration for Sport rejected the appeal filed by the Serbian FA, and upheld in part the appeal filed by the Albanian FA, meaning the match is deemed to have been forfeited by Serbia with the scoreline of 0–3 and Serbia are deducted three points.)
- Date: 14 October 2014
- Venue: Partizan Stadium, Belgrade
- Referee: Martin Atkinson (England)
- Attendance: 25,200
- Weather: Clear; 20 °C (68 °F); 73% humidity

A UEFA Euro 2016 qualifying match involving the national association football teams of Serbia and Albania took place on 14 October 2014 at the Partizan Stadium in Belgrade, Serbia. The match was abandoned after several incidents of hooliganism took place both on and off the field. Serbian fans had chanted "Ubij, ubij Šiptara" (Kill, kill the Albanian), and threw flares and other objects on the pitch. At that point a drone quadcopter carrying an Albanian nationalist banner with an image of Greater Albania appeared on the pitch.

During an interruption of play, Albanian players rushed towards a Serbian player, Stefan Mitrović, who had brought down the banner from the drone attempting to remove it. Conflict arose when Bekim Balaj ran over and took the banner. This triggered a pitch invasion by Serbian fans and security stewards, who proceeded to attack some of the Albanian players, four of whom sustained minor injuries. In addition to attacks by Serbian fans, the Albanian side claimed that their players were also attacked by stewards and riot police. This was denied and a counter-claim of provocation was made by Serbian officials.

On 24 October 2014, UEFA awarded Serbia a 3–0 walkover win against Albania on the grounds that Albania had been at fault for refusing to resume the match. Serbia was, however, given a three-point deduction, and ordered to play its next two homes games behind closed doors. In addition both teams were fined €100,000. The decision was appealed by both Serbia and Albania, but the decision was upheld by UEFA. Both associations then filed further appeals to the Court of Arbitration for Sport, and on 10 July 2015, the Court of Arbitration for Sport rejected the appeal entirely filed by the Football Association of Serbia, but upheld in part the appeal filed by the Albanian Football Association. The CAS ruled that the match abandonment was caused by "security lapses of the organizers and acts of violence exerted on the Albanian players by the Serbian fans and at least one security steward", and therefore reversed the result, awarding a 3–0 victory to Albania. The points deduction to Serbia, fines, and order to play Serbia home games without a crowd were left intact.

== Background ==
The historically rivalrous countries of Serbia and Albania were drawn together on 23 February 2014 in UEFA Euro 2016 qualifying Group I. Although Armenia and Azerbaijan were separated in the qualifier to avoid incidents (due to the Nagorno-Karabakh conflict) as well as Gibraltar and Spain (due to the disputed status of Gibraltar), Serbia and Albania were not, with UEFA claiming that it was because neither nation had directly fought a war with each other. The two countries have strong political disagreements regarding Kosovo, which culminated during the Kosovo War. UEFA further defended their decision to keep Albania and Serbia in the same group, claiming that because neither association had requested to be kept separate from each other, nor were there any requests filed after the draw, UEFA did not feel the need to separate the teams.

== Match ==
=== Events ===
The game between Serbia and Albania took place at Partizan Stadium in Belgrade, Serbia, on 14 October 2014, as part of UEFA Euro 2016 qualifying Group I. The Football Association of Serbia, Albanian Football Association, and UEFA had all mutually agreed to ban Albanian fans from attending the game for precautionary reasons, unless they did not carry any kind of Albanian paraphernalia.

According to the Albanian Football Association, on the day of the game, the Albanian team bus was hit with stones thrown by Serbian fans, and a chunk of concrete was thrown at them while on the field, as well as "coins, lighters and other objects" which were hurled at players during pre-game warm-ups.

Before the game started, Serbian supporters chanted "Kill the Albanians".

During the game's opening moments, Serbian fans burned a NATO flag. Around 15 minutes into the game, the first flare was thrown on the pitch. Approximately ten minutes later, a Greek flag was raised by the Serbian fans. Ten minutes before half time, flares were thrown towards Ansi Agolli as he was about to take a corner kick, and a firecracker exploded. Several objects were thrown at him, and at the assistant referee. The match was briefly suspended, and Danko Lazović and Aleksandar Kolarov attempted to ease tension as players briefly retreated from stands. After 40 seconds, the match continued, while the stadium announcer asked fans not to throw objects onto the pitch. At around the 40-minute mark, a bottle was thrown at Bekim Balaj, and some Serbian fans tried to invade the pitch, leading to brawls between them and security.

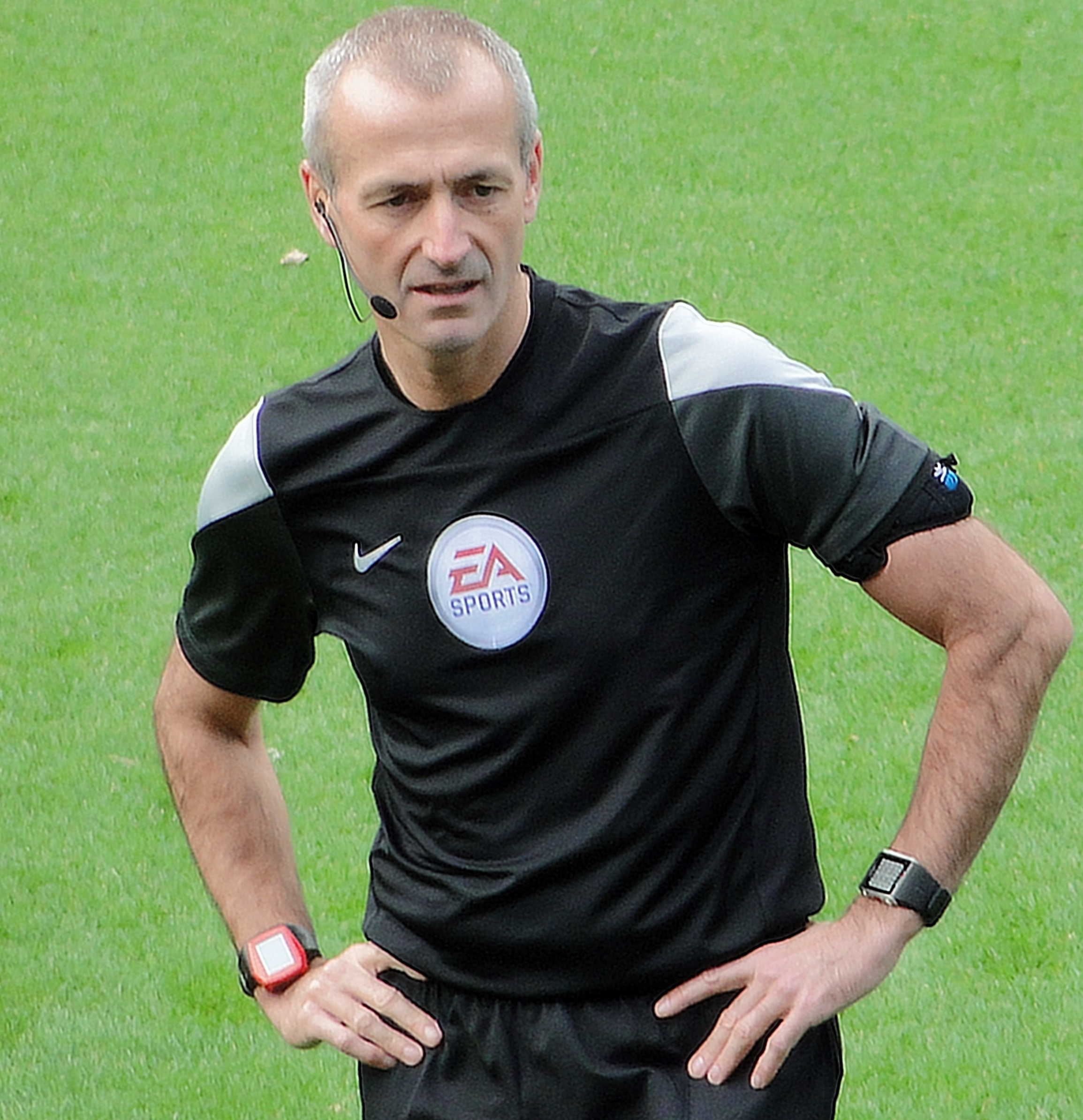
English referee Martin Atkinson, who suspended the match before abandoning it

In the 42nd minute of the match, English referee Martin Atkinson suspended the game again due to Serbian fans launching flares onto the pitch. While the game was suspended, a small remote-controlled quadcopter drone suspending a gonfalon hovered over the stadium. This nationalistic banner showed the faces of modern Albania's founding father and prime minister, Ismail Kemal, and the Albanian revolutionary commander Isa Boletini, the word "autochthonous" (in English), 28 November 1912 (the date of the Albanian Declaration of Independence), and a map of Greater Albania (with the territory covered in the Albanian flag). Serbian defender Stefan Mitrović jumped and pulled the flag down, causing Albanian defenders Andi Lila and Taulant Xhaka to run at him in attempt to retrieve it, leading to a brief scuffle between players. Bekim Balaj finally took the flag from Mitrović, and tried to take it off the field, until a Serbian fan ran onto the pitch and struck him across the back of the head with a plastic stool. Albanian captain Lorik Cana quickly took the fan to the ground and began punching him, before the situation escalated into a brawl involving players from both teams, Serbian fans, substitutes, pitch stewards, and staff. Serbian hooligans came onto the pitch and began attacking Albanian players with chairs and other objects, prompting the referee to lead the teams off the field. Albanian players were attacked and hit by thrown objects as they ran into the player tunnel, whereas Serbian players received a standing ovation while they calmly left the pitch. After a 30-minute delay, the game was finally abandoned at 0–0.

Before the Albanian team left the stadium, Serbian police searched the bags of an entire 45-person delegation of supporters from Albania in an attempt to find the remote for the drone, to no avail. Responsibility for the drone was immediately claimed by the Shvercerat, a fan group of the Macedonian club Shkupi, a club operated by Albanians, though no evidence has surfaced to support their claim.

In the following match between the two teams, played in Elbasan on 7 October 2015, the Serbian fans were not allowed to travel to Albania for security reasons. On that same day, Albanian police arrested a man suspected of piloting the drone during the Belgrade match.

=== Details ===
14 October 2014
20:45 CEST

Serbia	0–3 Awarded	Albania
	Report

Partizan Stadium, Belgrade
Attendance: 25,200
Referee: Martin Atkinson (England)

Serbia	Albania

GK	1	Vladimir Stojković
RB	6	Branislav Ivanović (c)	(yellow card) 35'
CB	13	Stefan Mitrović
CB	5	Matija Nastasić
LB	11	Aleksandar Kolarov
CM	8	Nemanja Gudelj
CM	14	Nemanja Matić
RW	7	Zoran Tošić
AM	19	Filip Đuričić
LW	10	Dušan Tadić
CF	18	Danko Lazović
Manager:
(Netherlands) Dick Advocaat

GK	1	Etrit Berisha
RB	4	Elseid Hysaj
CB	5	Lorik Cana (c)
CB	15	Mërgim Mavraj
LB	7	Ansi Agolli	(yellow card) 34'
DM	13	Burim Kukeli
CM	14	Taulant Xhaka
CM	22	Amir Abrashi
RM	2	Andi Lila
LM	3	Ermir Lenjani
CF	19	Bekim Balaj
Manager:
(Italy) Gianni De Biasi

Assistant referees:
Michael Mullarkey (England)
Stephen Child (England)
Fourth official:
Peter Kirkup (England)
Additional assistant referees:
Anthony Taylor (England)
Craig Pawson (England)

Match rules

- 90 minutes (match abandoned after 42 minutes)
- Maximum of three substitutions.

== Reactions ==
Upon arriving at Tirana International Airport, the Albanian team were ebulliently received by a crowd of 5,000 fans. 15,000 people feasted in the early morning hours at the Mother Teresa Square of Tirana. Festivities were also held by Albanian supporters in Pristina, Kosovo, as well as in Skopje, Struga, and Kumanovo. In Tetovo, Albanians who celebrated were fined €200 for being too loud by the local authorities. A few days later, the team was awarded by the cities of Tirana, Vlorë, Kamëz, and Bajram Curri with awards of honour and city recognition for protecting national symbols.

The Serbian side claimed that this was a staged political provocation from the Albanian side, and accused an Albanian VIP attending the match, Olsi Rama (brother of Prime Minister Edi Rama) of piloting the drone, and searched him for the remote. Rama would emphatically reject this accusation. The Serbian Prime Minister's office also stated that Rama was arrested and sent home to Albania, a claim denied by the Albanian government's spokesman. Rama denied any involvement and said that he had been moved from the VIP box for security reasons and informed the authorities that he held American citizenship before being given a police escort to waiting buses. Later, Igli Tare, former Albanian captain and current Lazio sports director, declared that he was with Rama, and that the latter merely carried a camera.

On the other hand, UEFA President Michel Platini said he was "deeply saddened" by what had happened, adding: "Football is supposed to bring people together and our game should not be mixed with politics of any kind. The scenes in Belgrade last night were inexcusable." FIFA President Sepp Blatter said: "Football should never be used for political messages. I strongly condemn what happened in Belgrade last night."

Serbian Foreign Minister Ivica Dačić stated that the flag incident was a "political provocation", and "The main question for me is how will the European Union and UEFA react, because if someone from Serbia had unveiled a flag of Greater Serbia in Tirana or Pristina it would already be on the agenda of the UN Security Council". On 16 October, Serbian Interior Minister Nebojša Stefanović said that the police were examining the drone to determine its commander and where it was purchased. Serbian authorities later claimed that Albania was "not mature enough" to join the European Union because "statements by leaders of the Albanian government demonstrate that they knew such a provocation was being prepared". This prompted the Albanian Ministry of Foreign Affairs to summon the Serbian envoy and cast further doubt on a visit by Albania's Prime Minister Edi Rama to Belgrade on 22 October, the first of its kind in almost 70 years. Eventually the visit itself was postponed to 10 November 2014, but Rama was not expected to see the President of Serbia, Tomislav Nikolić.

Serbian Prime Minister Aleksandar Vučić said that he had warned EU representatives five times ahead of the game of a possible provocation by the Albanian officials at the game, noting that some of the officials wore scarves of the Kosovo Liberation Army, saying "it was clear that they had come with an unambiguous intention to provoke the hosts".

Albanian Prime Minister Edi Rama responded by declaring that "a normal Serbia might be possible only if the real Serbia will understand that Greater Albania is their nightmare, not our project". In an interview he also added that "the sooner Serbia formally recognizes that Kosovo will never again be its part, the better for Serbia and the region", thus inviting Serbia to recognize Kosovo.

Agim Cana, former footballer and father of Albania's captain Lorik, declared that the Serbian fans' behavior was racist and fascist.

== Incidents as a result of the game ==
Incidents followed the game outside of Belgrade, not only in Serbia, but also in other countries:

=== In Serbia ===
In Serbia, mostly in its northern province Vojvodina, after the match, at least a dozen bakeries and snack bars owned by ethnic Albanians were set on fire in Novi Sad, Sombor and Stara Pazova, and a bomb was used in one case.

=== In Montenegro ===
The Albanian embassy in Podgorica, Montenegro, was pelted with stones, which broke windows, and a note of protest was sent to the Ambassador of Montenegro in Tirana in regards.

Albanians in Montenegro celebrated in Ulcinj, Plav and Tuzi. Incidents of brawls among Montenegrin Albanians near Podgorica were recorded and four students had checked in the hospital as a result of bruises because of fights among them.

=== In southern Albania ===
Within Albania, as soon as the match and the subsequent events in the stadium were over, a group of hundred Albanian nationalists carrying flags and nationalist banners attacked local ethnic Greeks, attacked houses, smashed car windows in the Greek-inhabited village of Derviçan, south of Gjirokastër. At the same time the same group launched profanities against local ethnic Greeks and slogans against Serbia and Greece. Their activity was stopped after police intervention. The incident triggered diplomatic intervention from Greece with the Greek Ministry of Foreign Affairs sending a démarche to the Albanian Ministry of Foreign Affairs and demanded the trial of those responsible for the attacks. The Albanian foreign minister Ditmir Bushati stated that "quick and efficient reaction of the state police, identified the responsible people".

=== In Austria ===
After the match, about fifty Albanians threw bottles at a Serbian coffeehouse in Vienna. Several cars, including police cars, were damaged.

== Ruling ==
=== UEFA ruling ===
The day after the match, UEFA opened disciplinary proceedings against the football associations of both Serbia and Albania. Serbia were charged for the setting off/throwing of fireworks and missiles (Article 16 (2b & c) UEFA Disciplinary Regulations), crowd disturbance (Art. 16(2h) DR), field invasion by supporters (Art. 16(2a) DR), insufficient organisation (Art. 16(1) DR) and use of a laser pointer (Art. 16(2d) DR). Albania were charged for refusing to play (Art. 27(1) UEFA Competition Regulations) and the display of an illicit banner (Art. 16(2e) DR).

After the meeting by the UEFA Control, Ethics and Disciplinary Body on 23 October 2014, UEFA announced the ruling on the following day. The match was declared as forfeited and Albania were deemed to have lost the match 3–0. Serbia were deducted three points, and ordered to play their next two home matches behind closed doors. Both associations were also fined €100,000. The decision was appealed by both Serbia and Albania, but the decision was upheld by UEFA.

==== Reactions to UEFA ruling ====
- Albanian striker Bekim Balaj, who was hit in the head with a stool by a Serbian fan on the pitch, posted a sarcastic comment on his Facebook page to Michel Platini and UEFA, saying "Sorry Platini for the stool that I almost broke with my head, bravo UEFA".
- Albanian Football Federation's president Armand Duka declared: "I am disillusioned because we were claiming a legal verdict from UEFA. I do not understand what precedent this may set when a squad physically beats the opposing players on the pitch. I do not know if there is a greater scandal than this." He declared that Albania would appeal the decision. Cimi Shakohoxha, part of the Albanian Federation, called the decision a travesty. He said "It's a cop out. We are totally committed to banishing racism from football, and this judgment appears to fly in the face of that aim. This is not about the point—it's about fighting racism."
- Albania's coach Gianni De Biasi declared to the media that the decision was scandalous, whereas Albania's captain Lorik Cana said that the decision was completely unfair, as the referee never told Albania to go back to the pitch, rather only asked them if they were fit to go back. Kosovo's football association president, Fadil Vokrri, also deemed the decision scandalous. Notable former footballer Sokol Kushta declared that UEFA made an unforgivable mistake with the decision and added that "in a brothel there are no good girls", discrediting UEFA.
- Albania's Prime Minister Edi Rama declared that the decision did not render any justice, however he promised that Albania would welcome Serbia in a renewed Shkodër-based Loro Boriçi Stadium, whose capacity would increase to 20,000 spectators and would be ready by 2015.
- On 25 October 2014, in Nyon, Switzerland, Albanian supporters staged a protest in front of UEFA's headquarters against the decision. Other protests were held in Tirana, Albania, as well as in Pristina, Kosovo, Podgorica, and Tetovo, Macedonia.
- Albanian-American organization Albanian Roots called for mass reaction. From petitions, protests, boycotts, letters to government officials, and involvement of Human & Civil rights organizations, to writing letters to UEFA, FIFA, and Michel Platini.
- More than a dozen protests were held all over the world by Albanians and non-Albanians in reaction to the ruling, claiming that UEFA's "fair play" policy was not upheld and that political influence was a cause of the decision. In Finland, more than 100 Albanians awaited Michel Platini in a protest where they associated him as with the 'political mafia'.
- Albanian football players from around the world condemned the decision and stated their disappointment with the lack of justice from the disciplinary board.
- Some outside media were also critical of UEFA's decision to award Serbia a victory after the violence and actions of its fans, despite Serbia being deducted 3 points.
- Albanian showman and celebrity Ardit Gjebrea called for a consumer boycott of Serbian products in Albanian markets.

=== CAS ruling ===
As neither the Albanian nor the Serbian football associations were satisfied with the UEFA ruling, they both filed further appeals to the Court of Arbitration for Sport. The CAS announced the hearing date will be April 17. After the hearing, the CAS announced that the final decision regarding the match will be on July 10, 2015. That day, the Court of Arbitration for Sport rejected the appeal filed by the Serbian FA completely, and upheld in part the appeal filed by the Albanian FA, meaning the match was deemed to have been forfeited by Serbia with 0–3 and Serbia were, in addition, deducted three points from the game.

== Effect on Euro 2016 qualification ==
The victory and accompanying three points awarded by the CAS to Albania proved decisive as they qualified for the final tournament in second place with 14 points. Albania's qualification came at the expense of Denmark, which finished in third with 12 points and failed to qualify after losing a playoff to Sweden. Serbia finished qualification in fourth place with four points. Even if they had been able to keep the victory as initially awarded, and additionally not been deducted any points, Serbia would have still failed to qualify.

== See More ==
- 2025 Africa Cup of Nations final
