= Mërgim Mavraj =

Albanian footballer (born 1986)

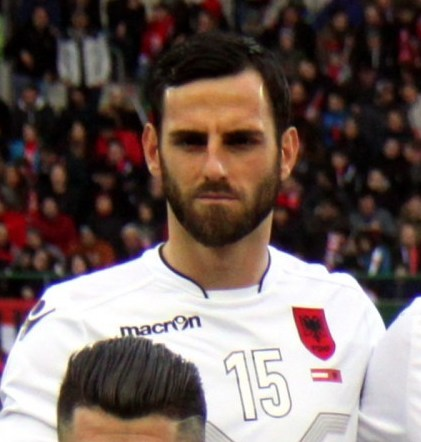
- Mavraj with Albania in 2016

Personal information
- Date of birth: 9 June 1986 (age 40)
- Place of birth: Hanau, West Germany
- Height: 1.89 m (6 ft 2 in)
- Position: Centre-back

Youth career
- 1996–1997: Sportfreunde Seligenstadt
- 1997–2003: Kickers Offenbach
- 2003–2004: SG Rosenhöhe Offenbach
- 2004–2005: Darmstadt 98

Senior career*
Years	Team	Apps	(Gls)
2005–2007	Darmstadt 98	38	(2)
2007–2008	VfL Bochum II	8	(1)
2007–2010	VfL Bochum	65	(1)
2011–2014	Greuther Fürth	105	(3)
2014–2016	1. FC Köln	43	(0)
2015	1. FC Köln II	4	(0)
2017–2018	Hamburger SV	31	(0)
2018	Aris	5	(0)
2019	FC Ingolstadt	12	(0)
2019–2021	Greuther Fürth	42	(0)
2021–2022	Türkgücü München	13	(0)
Total		366	(7)

International career
2007	Germany U20	1	(0)
2007–2009	Germany U21	2	(0)
2012–2020	Albania	50	(3)
- * Club domestic league appearances and goals

Mërgim Mavraj (Albanian pronunciation: [mɛɾˈɡim maˈvɾaɪ]; born 9 June 1986) is a former professional footballer who played as a centre-back for various clubs in Germany and represented the Albania national team at senior international level.

Mavraj started his career in the youth systems of Sportfreunde Seligenstadt, Kickers Offenbach, SG Rosenhöhe Offenbach, and Darmstadt 98, making his professional debut with Darmstadt 98 in 2005. He went on to play in the Bundesliga for clubs including VfL Bochum, SpVgg Greuther Fürth, where he helped the team win the 2011–12 2. Bundesliga title and secure promotion to the Bundesliga, 1. FC Köln, and Hamburger SV, and had a brief spell in the Super League Greece with Aris.

Born in Hanau, West Germany, Mavraj represented Germany U20 and U21 at youth level before switching allegiance to Albania, for whom he earned 50 caps and scored three goals between 2012 and 2020, and was part of the squad that represented the country at UEFA Euro 2016, their first-ever appearance in a major international tournament.

== Club career ==
=== Early career and Darmstadt 98 ===
Mavraj was born in Hanau, West Germany to ethnic Albanian parents from Istok, Kosovo. He started playing football at the age of 10 at Sportfreunde Seligenstadt in 1996. Then he joined Kickers Offenbach in 1997, where he stayed for six years until 2003, before spending the 2003–04 season at SG Rosenhöhe Offenbach. At the age of 16, he spent a short period as an intern and observer with the police in Mühlheim, near Hanau. In 2004, shortly before his final school exams, he signed for the youth team of Darmstadt 98. During the 2004–05 campaign, he played for the under-19 side, making 23 league appearances and scoring three goals, although the team finished bottom of the table with only four wins in 26 matches that season.

Mavraj was promoted to the senior Darmstadt 98 team during the 2005–06 season, making 13 appearances and scoring two goals, helping Darmstadt 98 finish fifth in the league. He made his professional debut on 18 March 2006 against SC Pfullendorf in a Regionalliga Süd match, starting in defence before being sent off in the 51st minute after a second yellow card in a 3–1 away loss. He scored his first goal later that season in a league match against 1. FC Kaiserslautern II, contributing to a 2–1 win. Five days later, he scored again in a 3–0 win against SV 07 Elversberg. In the 2006–07 season, Mavraj made 25 league appearances. His performances that season earned him a call-up to the Germany U21 squad. Darmstadt 98 finished 16th in the league that season, resulting in relegation.

=== VfL Bochum ===
On 1 August 2007, Mavraj signed for VfL Bochum for a reported fee of €350,000. He initially played for the reserve team, competing in the 2007–08 Oberliga Westfalen, making seven appearances and scoring one goal in his debut match, as the team was eventually promoted to the Regionalliga West. On 10 May 2008, he made his first-team debut on matchday 33, the penultimate round of the 2007–08 Bundesliga, playing 22 minutes against Karlsruher SC in a 3–1 victory. A week later, on the final matchday, he started and scored his first Bundesliga goal in a 2–1 loss to Hansa Rostock. In the 2008–09 Bundesliga season, Mavraj made a significant step in his development and was regarded as one of the most improved players in the squad, featuring sporadically in the first half of the campaign as a substitute and occasional starter before establishing himself as a regular starter in the second half, playing most matches for 90 minutes and missing only a few games due to suspensions from accumulated yellow cards and second yellow cards, finishing the season with 23 appearances and being noted for his strong team spirit, unity, and work ethic, contributing to the club's achievement of retaining Bundesliga status after finishing 14th in the league table despite a difficult first half of the season.

In the 2009–10 Bundesliga season, Mavraj made 27 league appearances, playing the full 90 minutes in most matches and recording one assist, with over 2,200 minutes of playing time. On 12 December 2009, he scored an own goal in a 1–5 home defeat against Bayern Munich. On 6 March 2010, he received his fifth yellow card in a 4–1 loss against VfL Wolfsburg, resulting in a one-match suspension. Ahead of the final matchday, Bochum trailed Hannover 96 by two points and needed a win in their direct encounter to avoid relegation, but lost 0–3, with Mavraj playing the full match, confirming their 17th-place finish and relegation to the 2. Bundesliga. In the 2010–11 2. Bundesliga season, he was a regular starter, playing every minute in the first 12 league matches before being substituted in the 58th minute on matchday 13; he was subsequently dropped from the professional squad by manager Friedhelm Funkel following a 1–4 defeat against Ingolstadt 04 and assigned to the reserve team prior to his transfer to SpVgg Greuther Fürth in the 2011 winter transfer window.

=== Greuther Fürth ===
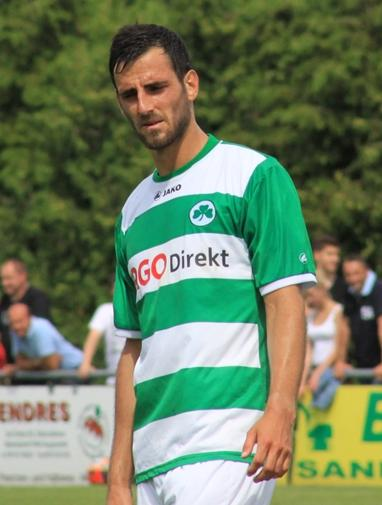
Mavraj with SpVgg Greuther Fürth in 2012.

On 23 January 2011, Mavraj signed for SpVgg Greuther Fürth for a reported fee of €200,000, remaining in the 2. Bundesliga. He made his debut on 29 January 2011 in a 2–2 draw against Alemannia Aachen at the New Tivoli stadium, coming on as a substitute for Stephan Schröck in the 90th minute. He scored his first goal for the club on 31 July 2011 in a 2011–12 DFB-Pokal match against Eimsbütteler TV, opening the scoring in the 17th minute of a 10–0 victory. Mavraj was ever-present throughout all DFB-Pokal rounds as Greuther Fürth reached the semi-finals, where they were eliminated by Borussia Dortmund after extra time on 20 March 2012. He scored his first league goal on 2 October 2011 in a 2–2 draw against Karlsruher SC, netting in the 90+2 minute. At the end of the 2011–12 2. Bundesliga season, Greuther Fürth won the league with 70 points and a goal difference of +46, earning promotion to the Bundesliga.

On 7 August 2012, Mavraj replaced central defensive partner Thomas Kleine as team captain for the 2012–13 Bundesliga season after being elected by his teammates in a secret ballot ahead of Kleine, Gerald Asamoah, Stephan Fürstner and Milorad Peković. He made his first Bundesliga appearance as club captain on 25 August 2012 in a 3–0 home defeat against Bayern Munich. During the first half of the season, he was an ever-present figure, playing every available minute across all matches of that period, accumulating five yellow cards, including a dismissal for two bookings on 15 December 2012 in the final match of the first half, his only dismissal of the campaign; Greuther Fürth struggled in the top flight, recording only one win and remaining at the bottom of the table heading into the winter break. In the second half of the season, he continued as a regular starter and finished the campaign with 32 league appearances, as the team recorded 4 wins, 9 draws and 19 losses overall. Greuther Fürth ultimately finished the season in last place, resulting in relegation to the 2. Bundesliga.

During the 2013–14 2. Bundesliga season, Mavraj was an ever-present figure, playing every available minute in the matches he featured in, and missed only three league matches mostly due to suspension resulting from accumulated yellow cards and a dismissal. He started the season by providing an assist in a 2–0 win in the opening match against Arminia Bielefeld. On 1 December 2013, he provided his second assist of the season in a 1–0 win against Energie Cottbus, setting up the only goal of the match in the 5th minute. On 3 March 2014, he scored the winning goal in the 87th minute in a 3–2 victory against FSV Frankfurt, as Greuther Fürth came from behind twice to secure the win that kept them in contention for promotion to the Bundesliga. On 25 March 2014, he was sent off after receiving a second yellow card in the first minute of stoppage time for a foul on Sören Brandy during a 1–1 draw against 1. FC Union Berlin. On 25 March 2014, he provided his third assist of the season in a 4–1 win against Fortuna Düsseldorf.

On 7 May 2013, despite Greuther Fürth's poor results, Mavraj was rated highly by experts in Germany and was considered among the best defenders in the Bundesliga. At the end of the season, Greuther Fürth collected 60 points and finished third in the league, qualifying for the promotion play-off to face the 16th-placed team from the Bundesliga. He played the full duration of both legs of the play-off against Hamburger SV, a 0–0 away draw on 15 May 2014 and a 1–1 home draw three days later, as Greuther Fürth were eliminated on the away goals rule. Ahead of the second leg of the promotion play-off, Mavraj announced that it would be his final match with Greuther Fürth, confirming his departure at the end of the season after deciding not to renew his contract, which was set to expire on 30 June 2014. Mavraj left Greuther Fürth after 32 Bundesliga appearances and 73 2. Bundesliga appearances to join 1. FC Köln.

=== 1. FC Köln ===
On 19 May 2014, 2. Bundesliga champions 1. FC Köln, newly promoted to the Bundesliga, announced the signing of Mavraj on a three-year contract until 30 June 2017. He made his debut on 16 August 2014 in the first round of the 2014–15 DFB-Pokal, playing the full 90 minutes in a 4–0 win against FT Braunschweig. He then featured in the second round of the DFB-Pokal on 28 October 2014 against MSV Duisburg, playing the full 120 minutes in a goalless draw before Köln won 4–1 on penalties. After replacing Dominic Maroh, who was unavailable due to illness, he made his Bundesliga debut on 18 October 2014, starting in a 2–1 win against Borussia Dortmund. Mavraj then went on to establish himself as a starter, playing every minute in subsequent matches until mid-December 2014 and keeping Dominic Maroh on the bench, before later losing his starting place and mainly appearing as a substitute in the second half of the season, while also making two further starts in place of Kevin Wimmer. On 24 December 2014, Mavraj was noted for his passing accuracy in the first half of the Bundesliga season, ranking among the top players in the league with an 88.60% pass completion rate from 342 passes, placing him sixth overall and among the few non-Bayern Munich players in the top 10 of the statistical ranking published by the Bundesliga. Mavraj finished with a total of 15 appearances as Köln finished 12th in the league table.

Ahead of the 2015–16 season, Mavraj sustained an injury that sidelined him for around seven months, followed by a rehabilitation period during which he briefly featured for the reserve team to regain match fitness while Köln rejected a winter loan move; he returned to first-team action on 19 December 2015, coming on late in a 2–1 win over Borussia Dortmund on matchday 17 of the 2015–16 Bundesliga, marking his 100th Bundesliga appearance. Following his return, Mavraj established himself in the team during the second half of the season, making a series of appearances and playing full 90 minutes in several matches, contributing to Köln's defensive line. On 23 April 2016, Köln secured their Bundesliga status with two matches remaining in the season following a 4–1 win over Darmstadt 98, a match in which Mavraj started from the first minute. Mavraj made a total of 12 appearances, and Köln ultimately finished in 9th place in the league table.

On 12 December 2016, Mavraj was included in the Bundesliga Team of the Week for matchday 14 after a strong defensive performance in a 1–1 draw against Borussia Dortmund, where he played the full 90 minutes and was praised for his defensive duels and his ability to limit the opposition's attacking impact. Over the first half of the 2016–17 Bundesliga season, he was ever-present, playing every league match in full before departing in the winter transfer window.

On 10 January 2017, Mavraj was named Köln's best defender based on performance statistics during his spell at the club, including a 58% duel success rate and an 83% passing accuracy, outperforming his defensive teammates in the internal ranking. On 31 January 2017, Mavraj was selected in the best eleven of the first half of the 2016–17 Bundesliga in a voting competition where he received 26% of the total votes, finishing just behind Sokratis Papastathopoulos of Borussia Dortmund and ahead of defenders such as Bayern Munich duo Mats Hummels and Jérôme Boateng.

=== Hamburger SV ===
On 27 December 2016, Mavraj signed with fellow Bundesliga team Hamburger SV until 30 June 2019 for a transfer fee of reportedly €1.8 million. In the second half of the 2016–17 Bundesliga season, he made 14 appearances, playing every minute in all of them. He made his debut on 21 January 2017 in a 1–0 away defeat against VfL Wolfsburg in matchday 17 of Bundesliga. Following an impressive performance in his fifth match for Hamburger SV on 12 February 2017, helping his team to a 3–0 victory against the eventual runners-up of the 2016–17 Bundesliga, RB Leipzig, Mavraj was selected in the team of the week by Kicker. On 1 March 2017, Mavraj conceded a penalty in the 2016–17 DFB-Pokal quarter-final match against Borussia Mönchengladbach, which was converted by Lars Stindl to give the visitors the lead in a 2–1 defeat that eliminated Hamburger SV from the competition. On 20 May 2017, Mavraj played in the final matchday of the season, in a 2–1 home victory against VfL Wolfsburg, a result which secured Hamburger SV's Bundesliga status by avoiding relegation in a direct encounter between the two sides.

At the start of the 2017–18 season, on 10 August 2017, Mavraj was named Vice-captain of Hamburger SV alongside fellow defender Kyriakos Papadopoulos. In the 2017–18 Bundesliga season, Mavraj made 17 league appearances between matchdays 2 and 23, with nearly all of them played in full minutes. Following the appointment of Christian Titz in March 2018, Mavraj was no longer part of the first-team plans amid a tactical and squad overhaul, and was dropped from the squad for a crucial relegation battle match against Hertha BSC, alongside several other first-team regulars as part of the coach's restructuring of the team. On 28 March 2018, Mavraj was dropped from the first-team setup by Titz and sent to train with the club's reserve team (U21), with the coaching staff citing sporting reasons and a tactical preference for quicker central defenders. Despite late-season changes under coach Titz, Hamburger SV finished 17th and were relegated from the Bundesliga for the first time in the club's history after 55 consecutive seasons in the top flight.

=== Aris Thessaloniki ===
After the conclusion of his contract with Hamburger SV, on 5 September 2018 Mavraj signed a two-year contract with Greek Super League club Aris Thessaloniki. He made his debut on 26 September 2018, playing the full 90 minutes in a 1–1 draw against PAOK in the 2018–19 Greek Cup group stage. He made his league debut on 6 October 2018, playing the full match in a 1–0 away defeat against Panionios on matchday 6 of the 2018–19 Super League Greece. Later that month, he made two more full league appearances, while his next matches came in early December, when he featured twice, once as a substitute and once as a starter; these were his only league appearances for the club during that period. His final appearance for the club came on 20 December 2018, when he played the full match in a 3–2 away defeat against Ergotelis in the Greek Cup group stage, a result that led to the team's elimination from the competition, after which Aris Thessaloniki reportedly initiated negotiations to terminate his contract along with several other players following poor results during the season. Mavraj subsequently terminated his contract with Aris Thessaloniki and on 3 January 2019 moved to Ingolstadt 04 in the 2. Bundesliga.

=== FC Ingolstadt 04 ===
On 3 January 2019, Ingolstadt 04 announced the signing of Mavraj on a 1.5-year contract. On 15 January 2019, shortly after joining the club, Mavraj suffered a hand fracture which required surgery, temporarily sidelining him at the start of his spell with the club. He made his debut on 29 January 2019 in a 1–0 away win against SpVgg Greuther Fürth in the 2018–19 2. Bundesliga Matchday 19, starting the match, being named Man of the Match, and was involved in the decisive moment that led to Ingolstadt's winning penalty, which was converted in the second half. In the second half of the season, Mavraj made 12 full league appearances from 16 available matches. The club finished 16th in the table, placing them in the relegation play-off zone. In the relegation play-off, Mavraj played both matches in full 90 minutes as Ingolstadt drew 4–4 on aggregate against SV Wehen Wiesbaden but were relegated to the 3. Liga on away goals, having won the first leg 2–1 away but lost the return leg 3–2 at home, where Mavraj provided an assist for Ingolstadt's second goal. Following Ingolstadt's relegation, Mavraj was linked with a departure from the club, as he did not intend to play in the 3. Liga, with reports suggesting a possible return to his former club SpVgg Greuther Fürth.

=== Return to SpVgg Greuther Fürth ===
On 26 June 2019, Mavraj completed a return to SpVgg Greuther Fürth. During the 2019–20 2. Bundesliga season, Mavraj initially struggled to establish himself as a key figure in the team but showed improvement in the weeks leading up to November 2019, demonstrating better positioning, defensive duels and composure, before suffering a shoulder ligament injury during a match against Darmstadt 98 on 5 November 2019, where he continued playing until the final whistle, and subsequent medical examination confirmed a partial ligament injury in the acromioclavicular joint which did not require surgery. Mavraj made 19 appearances up to 9 February 2020, before suffering a muscle injury in the adductor area during the match against Hannover 96, which sidelined him for several weeks and kept him out of action until the league resumed following the COVID-19 suspension in June 2020. Greuther Fürth ended the season in mid-table, remaining in the division.

On 22 November 2020, Mavraj assisted the opening goal in a 3–1 win against Jahn Regensburg, contributing both defensively and offensively in the match. Mavraj made 19 appearances in the 2020–21 2. Bundesliga season up to matchday 26, featuring regularly with only occasional absences, before not appearing in any of the final eight league matches of the season. SpVgg Greuther Fürth finished the 2020–21 2. Bundesliga season in 2nd place, earning automatic promotion to the Bundesliga. On 30 May 2021, it was announced that Greuther Fürth would not extend Mavraj's contract, ending his spell at the club after six seasons in total across two separate spells, and 157 total competitive appearances, during which he contributed to two promotions and was publicly thanked by sporting director Rachid Azzouzi for his role in the team's development.

=== Türkgücü München ===
On 25 July 2021, Mavraj began his spell with Türkgücü München, where he was appointed team captain upon arrival due to his experience, making his debut in a 0–0 draw against SC Verl as he led the defence to a clean sheet in the opening match of the 2021–22 3. Liga season. Mavraj was a regular part of the team during the first half of the 2021–22 season, making 13 appearances across 20 matchdays with a brief absence in October and November, before the club later faced financial difficulties, filed for insolvency in January 2022, and withdrew from the 3. Liga in March 2022 with all results annulled.

Mavraj did not join another professional club and has since been without a team, while later stating in 2022 that he still considered himself a footballer but was preparing for his post-playing career, including pursuing qualifications for a sporting director role and indicating he would not continue playing in the Albanian league.

== International career ==
=== Germany youth career and early involvement with Albania ===
Mavraj initially represented Germany at youth level, featuring for the under-20 side in 2007. He was also eligible to represent Albania due to his Albanian origin from Kosovo. In September 2006, he began procedures to obtain Albanian citizenship together with Besart Berisha, at a time when Hans-Peter Briegel was the head coach of the Albania national team. Around that time, he was included in gatherings of young Albanian talents organised by the Albanian Football Association, and was positively evaluated by Briegel's successor Otto Barić. He was granted Albanian citizenship on 27 September 2006. In October Mavraj received a call-up from the Albania national under-21 football team, which he declined, reportedly aiming for a place in the senior national team.

After declining Albania, later that month he joined the Germany U21 and made his debut on 21 February 2007 in a friendly against Italy as a substitute in a 0–0 draw. He found limited opportunities with the U21 side, making only one further appearance, which came on 31 March 2009 against Belarus in a 1–1 draw, where he played the full match.

=== Albania ===
The Albanian Football Association gave Mavraj his first senior opportunity when manager Josip Kuže called him up for a friendly against Northern Ireland in Tirana on 3 March 2010. It was his first senior call-up, which he initially accepted, but he withdrew before joining the squad, drawing criticism from the Albanian FA and supporters. Mavraj stated that he had requested more time to decide on his international future. The Albanian FA later indicated that he would not be considered at that time. His decision was reportedly influenced by communication with Matthias Sammer, then technical director of the German Football Association, who suggested he could still be considered for Germany after the 2010 FIFA World Cup. After difficulties at club level with VfL Bochum and relegation to the 2. Bundesliga, this option became unlikely.

After strong performances with SpVgg Greuther Fürth, he was again approached by Albania and in May 2012 confirmed his availability when called up by Gianni De Biasi for friendly matches against Qatar and Iran. He made his senior debut against Qatar on 22 May 2012 in a 2–1 win. His competitive debut came on 7 September 2012 in a 3–1 win over Cyprus in the opening match of the 2014 FIFA World Cup qualification – UEFA Group E, where he played the full 90 minutes. He featured in eight qualifying matches, playing every minute of his appearances and missing two matches in September 2013 due to injury. His performances during the qualifying campaign were positively noted in Albanian sports media for his defensive consistency. Albania finished fifth in the group with 11 points, narrowly behind the higher-placed teams. He scored his first international goal on 8 June 2014 in a 3–0 win over San Marino.

During the UEFA Euro 2016 qualifying Group I campaign, Mavraj played every available minute in Albania's first four fixtures, which ultimately yielded three wins and one draw. On 7 September 2014, in a 1–0 away win over Portugal, he was included in the team of the round. In October, Albania drew 1–1 with Denmark, while the subsequent match against Serbia was abandoned following a pitch invasion and violence involving home supporters, during which Mavraj was punched by a Serbian supporter; the Court of Arbitration for Sport later awarded Albania a 3–0 forfeit victory. On 14 November, in a France-hosted friendly arranged during the qualifying campaign, he scored Albania's opening goal in a 1–1 draw, heading the visitors into the lead in the first half. His performance was praised by French media, with Albanian outlet Panorama Sport reporting that he and Ermir Lenjani were rated among Albania's best players. On 29 March 2015, in a 2–1 home win over Armenia, Mavraj scored an own goal in the opening minutes before heading Albania's equaliser in the 77th minute as the hosts came from behind to secure victory. He subsequently missed Albania's final four qualifying matches due to an injury sustained at the beginning of the 2015–16 season with Köln in the Bundesliga. Albania subsequently secured historic qualification for the UEFA Euro 2016 finals in France, marking the nation's first appearance at a major international tournament.

On 21 May 2016, Mavraj was named in Albania's preliminary 27-man squad for UEFA Euro 2016, and later in the final 23-man squad. On 28 May, he captained Albania for the first time in a warm-up match against Qatar, becoming the youngest player to do so at the time. He played every minute of Albania's matches at Euro 2016, as they finished third in Group A with three points, defeating Romania 1–0 but being eliminated.

On 23 August 2020, Mavraj announced his retirement from international duty.

== Personal life ==
Mavraj's father, Mustafë Mavraj, was an Albanian emigrant in Germany who had previously left Yugoslavia in the 1970s and was politically active within the Albanian diaspora; he died on 3 April 2015 after an illness. His first name, Mërgim, means 'migration' in Albanian, a name given by his family in reference to their emigration from Istog, Kosovo to Germany.

Following Albania's historic participation at UEFA Euro 2016, Mavraj was among the members of the national team who were issued diplomatic passports by the Albanian government in recognition of their achievement. On 12 October 2018, Mavraj announced that he had obtained a Greek passport.

== Career statistics ==
=== Club ===
Appearances and goals by club, season and competition
Club	Season	League			Cup		Europe (Note: Includes UEFA Champions League and UEFA Europa League)		Other		Total	
Club	Season	Division	Apps	Goals	Apps	Goals	Apps	Goals	Apps	Goals	Apps	Goals
Darmstadt 98	2005–06	Regionalliga Süd	13	2	—		—		—		13	2
Darmstadt 98	2006–07	Regionalliga Süd	25	0	—		—		—		25	0
Darmstadt 98	Total		38	2	—		—		—		38	2
VfL Bochum II	2007–08	Oberliga Westfalen	7	1	—		—		—		7	1
VfL Bochum II	2008–09	Regionalliga West	1	0	—		—		—		1	0
VfL Bochum II	Total		8	1	—		—		—		8	1
VfL Bochum	2007–08	Bundesliga	2	1	—		—		—		2	1
VfL Bochum	2008–09	Bundesliga	23	0	0	0	—		—		23	0
VfL Bochum	2009–10	Bundesliga	27	0	1	0	—		—		28	0
VfL Bochum	2010–11	2. Bundesliga	13	0	1	0	—		—		14	0
VfL Bochum	Total		65	1	2	0	—		—		67	1
Greuther Fürth	2010–11	2. Bundesliga	13	0	—		—		—		13	0
Greuther Fürth	2011–12	2. Bundesliga	31	2	5	1	—		—		36	3
Greuther Fürth	2012–13	Bundesliga	32	0	1	0	—		—		33	0
Greuther Fürth	2013–14	2. Bundesliga	29	1	1	0	—		2 (Note: Appearances in 2013–14 Bundesliga relegation play-offs)	0	32	1
Greuther Fürth	Total		105	3	7	1	—		2	0	114	4
1. FC Köln	2014–15	Bundesliga	15	0	2	0	—		—		17	0
1. FC Köln	2015–16	Bundesliga	12	0	—		—		—		12	0
1. FC Köln	2016–17	Bundesliga	16	0	1	0	—		—		17	0
1. FC Köln	Total		43	0	3	0	—		—		46	0
1. FC Köln II	2015–16	Regionalliga West	4	0	—		—		—		4	0
Hamburger SV	2016–17	Bundesliga	14	0	2	0	—		—		16	0
Hamburger SV	2017–18	Bundesliga	17	0	1	0	—		—		18	0
Hamburger SV	Total		31	0	3	0	—		—		34	0
Aris	2018–19	Super League Greece	5	0	2	0	—		—		7	0
FC Ingolstadt	2018–19	2. Bundesliga	12	0	—		—		2 (Note: Appearances in league play-offs)	0	14	0
Greuther Fürth	2019–20	2. Bundesliga	23	0	1	0	—		—		24	0
Greuther Fürth	2020–21	2. Bundesliga	19	0	—		—		—		19	0
Greuther Fürth	Total		42	0	1	0	—		—		43	0
Türkgücü München	2021–22	3. Liga	13	0	2 (Note: One appearance in 2021–22 DFB-Pokal and one appearance in 2021–22 Bayern Pokal)	0	—		—		15	0
Career total			366	7	20	1	—		4	0	390	8

=== International ===
Appearances and goals by national team and year
National team	Year	Apps	Goals
Albania	2012	8	0
Albania	2013	6	0
Albania	2014	8	2
Albania	2015	1	1
Albania	2016	11	0
Albania	2017	6	0
Albania	2018	8	0
Albania	2019	2	0
Total		50	3

Scores and results list Albania's goal tally first, score column indicates score after each Mavraj goal.

List of international goals scored by Mërgim Mavraj
No.	Date	Venue	Cap	Opponent	Score	Result	Competition	Ref.
1	8 June 2014	Serravalle Stadium, Serravalle, San Marino	17	San Marino	1–0	3–0	Friendly	
2	14 November 2014	Stade de la Route de Lorient, Rennes, France	21	France	1–0	1–1	Friendly	
3	29 March 2015	Elbasan Arena, Elbasan, Albania	23	Armenia	1–1	2–1	UEFA Euro 2016 qualifying	

== Honours ==
Greuther Fürth

- 2. Bundesliga: 2011–12
