= UEFA Euro 2016 qualifying Group I =

Football tournament qualifying stage

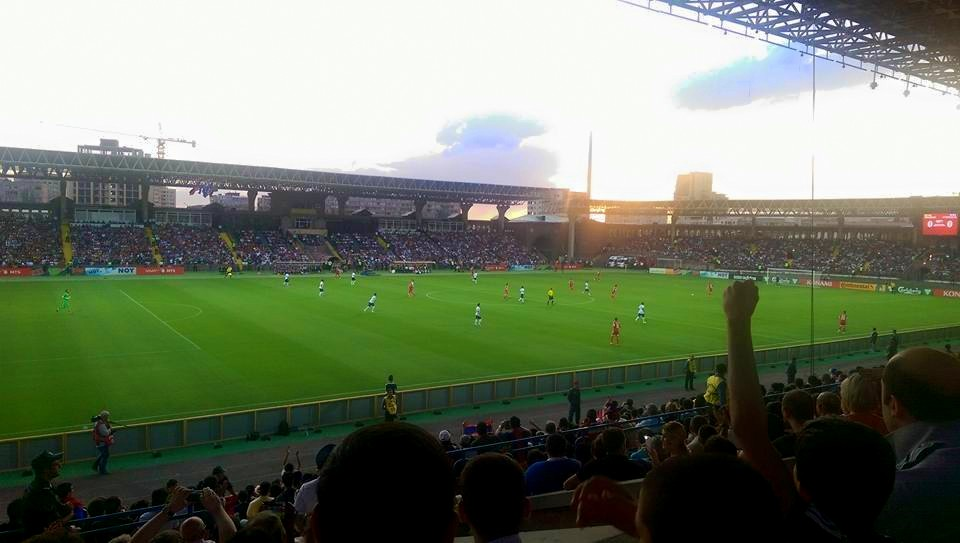
Armenia vs Portugal match in Yerevan, 13 June 2015

The UEFA Euro 2016 qualifying Group I was one of the nine groups to decide which teams would qualify for the UEFA Euro 2016 finals tournament. Group I consisted of five teams: Portugal, Denmark, Serbia, Armenia, and Albania, where they played against each other home-and-away in a round-robin format.

The top two teams, Portugal and Albania, qualified directly for the finals. As third-placed Denmark weren't the highest-ranked among all third-placed teams, they advanced to the play-offs, where they lost to Sweden and thus failed to qualify.

France were also partnered with the five-team Group I, which enabled the 2016 tournament hosts to play centralized friendlies against these countries on their 'spare' dates. However, these friendlies did not count in the qualifying group standings.

== Standings ==
Pos	Team	Pld	W	D	L	GF	GA	GD	Pts	Qualification	(Portugal)	(Albania)	(Denmark)	(Serbia)	(Armenia)
1	Portugal	8	7	0	1	11	5	+6	21	Qualify for final tournament	—	0–1	1–0	2–1	1–0
2	Albania	8	4	2	2	10	5	+5	14	Qualify for final tournament	0–1	—	1–1	0–2	2–1
3	Denmark	8	3	3	2	8	5	+3	12	Advance to play-offs	0–1	0–0	—	2–0	2–1
4	Serbia (Note: The Serbia v Albania match was awarded as a 3–0 win to Albania, and Serbia were also deducted three points, after the match was abandoned at 0–0 because home fans invaded the pitch and attacked Albania players when a drone carried a pro-Albanian flag over the stadium.)	8	2	1	5	8	13	−5	4		1–2	0–3	1–3	—	2–0
5	Armenia	8	0	2	6	5	14	−9	2		2–3	0–3	0–0	1–1	—

Source: UEFA
Rules for classification: Qualification tiebreakers

== Matches ==
The fixtures were released by UEFA the same day as the draw, which was held on 23 February 2014 in Nice. Times are CET/CEST, (Note: CET (UTC+1) for matches on 14 November 2014, and CEST (UTC+2) for all other matches.) as listed by UEFA (local times are in parentheses).

7 September 2014
18:00
(18:00 UTC+2)

Denmark	2–1	Armenia
Højbjerg 65'; Kahlenberg 80'	Report	Mkhitaryan 50'

Telia Parken, Copenhagen
Attendance: 20,141
Referee: Alexandru Tudor (Romania)
7 September 2014
20:45
(19:45 UTC+1)

Portugal	0–1	Albania
	Report	Balaj 52'

Estádio Municipal, Aveiro
Attendance: 23,205
Referee: Ruddy Buquet (France)

11 October 2014
18:00
(20:00 UTC+4)

Armenia	1–1	Serbia
Arzumanyan 73'	Report	Z. Tošić 89'

Vazgen Sargsyan Republican Stadium, Yerevan
Attendance: 8,500
Referee: Tom Harald Hagen (Norway)
11 October 2014
20:45
(20:45 UTC+2)

Albania	1–1	Denmark
Lenjani 38'	Report	Vibe 81'

Elbasan Arena, Elbasan (Note: Albania played their home matches at Elbasan Arena, Elbasan instead of their regular stadium, Qemal Stafa National Stadium, Tirana, as the national stadium would be reconstructed.)
Attendance: 11,330
Referee: Viktor Kassai (Hungary)

14 October 2014
20:45
(20:45 UTC+2)

Denmark	0–1	Portugal
	Report	Ronaldo 90+5'

Telia Parken, Copenhagen
Attendance: 36,562
Referee: Felix Brych (Germany)
14 October 2014
20:45
(20:45 UTC+2)

Serbia	0–3 Awarded (Note: The Serbia v Albania match was abandoned with the score at 0–0 in the 42nd minute after "various incidents", which resulted in the Albania players refusing to return to the field. UEFA ruled that Albania had forfeited the match and awarded a 3–0 win to Serbia, and deducted three points from Serbia for their involvement in the events. Serbia were ordered next two home qualifying games behind closed doors, and both Serbia and Albania were fined €100,000. The decision was appealed by both Serbia and Albania to UEFA, but the decision was upheld. Both associations then filed further appeals to the Court of Arbitration for Sport, and on 10 July 2015, the Court of Arbitration for Sport rejected the appeal filed by the Serbian FA, and upheld in part the appeal filed by the Albanian FA, meaning the match is deemed to have been forfeited by Serbia with the scoreline of 0–3 and Serbia are deducted three points.)	Albania
	Report

Partizan Stadium, Belgrade
Attendance: 25,200
Referee: Martin Atkinson (England)

14 November 2014
20:45
(19:45 UTC±0)

Portugal	1–0	Armenia
Ronaldo 72'	Report

Estádio Algarve, Faro/Loulé
Attendance: 21,042
Referee: Anastasios Sidiropoulos (Greece)
14 November 2014
20:45
(20:45 UTC+1)

Serbia	1–3	Denmark
Z. Tošić 4'	Report	Bendtner 60', 85'; Kjær 62'

Partizan Stadium, Belgrade
Attendance: 0 (Note: Played behind closed doors due to a sanction imposed on Serbia after the abandoned match against Albania.)
Referee: Cüneyt Çakır (Turkey)

29 March 2015
18:00
(18:00 UTC+2)

Albania	2–1	Armenia
Mavraj 77'; Gashi 81'	Report	Mavraj 4' (o.g.)

Elbasan Arena, Elbasan
Attendance: 12,300
Referee: David Fernández Borbalán (Spain)
29 March 2015
20:45
(19:45 UTC+1)

Portugal	2–1	Serbia
Carvalho 10'; Coentrão 63'	Report	Matić 61'

Estádio da Luz, Lisbon
Attendance: 58,430
Referee: Gianluca Rocchi (Italy)

13 June 2015
18:00
(20:00 UTC+4)

Armenia	2–3	Portugal
Pizzelli 14'; Mkoyan 72'	Report	Ronaldo 29' (pen.), 55', 58'

Vazgen Sargsyan Republican Stadium, Yerevan
Attendance: 14,527
Referee: Serge Gumienny (Belgium)
13 June 2015
20:45
(20:45 UTC+2)

Denmark	2–0	Serbia
Y. Poulsen 13'; J. Poulsen 87'	Report

Telia Parken, Copenhagen
Attendance: 30,887
Referee: Björn Kuipers (Netherlands)

4 September 2015
20:45
(20:45 UTC+2)

Denmark	0–0	Albania
	Report

Telia Parken, Copenhagen
Attendance: 35,648
Referee: Willie Collum (Scotland)
4 September 2015
20:45
(20:45 UTC+2)

Serbia	2–0	Armenia
Hayrapetyan 22' (o.g.); Ljajić 53'	Report

Karađorđe Stadium, Novi Sad
Attendance: 0
Referee: Miroslav Zelinka (Czech Republic)

7 September 2015
18:00
(20:00 UTC+4)

Armenia	0–0	Denmark
	Report

Vazgen Sargsyan Republican Stadium, Yerevan
Attendance: 7,500
Referee: Svein Oddvar Moen (Norway)
7 September 2015
20:45
(20:45 UTC+2)

Albania	0–1	Portugal
	Report	Veloso 90+2'

Elbasan Arena, Elbasan
Attendance: 12,121
Referee: Jonas Eriksson (Sweden)

8 October 2015
20:45
(20:45 UTC+2)

Albania	0–2	Serbia
	Report	Kolarov 90+1'; Ljajić 90+4'

Elbasan Arena, Elbasan
Attendance: 12,330
Referee: Nicola Rizzoli (Italy)
8 October 2015
20:45
(19:45 UTC+1)

Portugal	1–0	Denmark
Moutinho 66'	Report

Estádio Municipal, Braga
Attendance: 29,860
Referee: Mark Clattenburg (England)

11 October 2015
18:00
(20:00 UTC+4)

Armenia	0–3	Albania
	Report	Hovhannisyan 9' (o.g.); Djimsiti 23'; Sadiku 76'

Vazgen Sargsyan Republican Stadium, Yerevan
Attendance: 4,700
Referee: Szymon Marciniak (Poland)
11 October 2015
18:00
(18:00 UTC+2)

Serbia	1–2	Portugal
Z. Tošić 65'	Report	Nani 5'; Moutinho 78'

Partizan Stadium, Belgrade
Attendance: 7,485
Referee: David Fernández Borbalán (Spain)

== Goalscorers ==
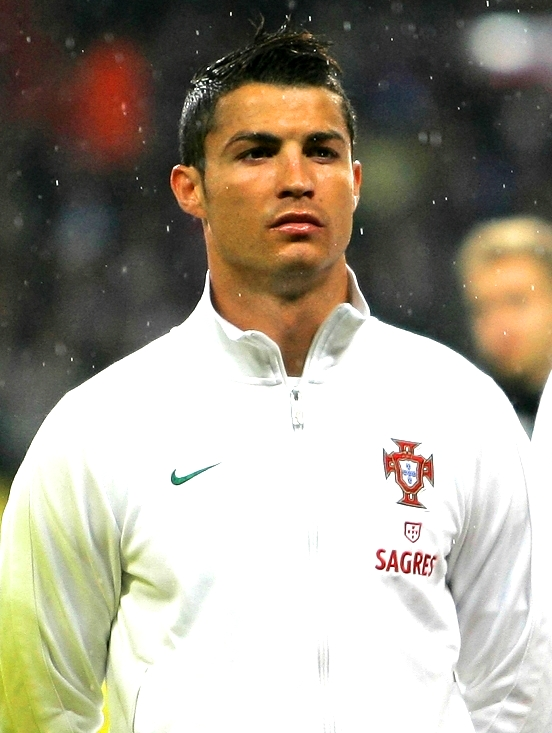
Cristiano Ronaldo, leading goalscorer with five goals

There were 39 goals scored in 20 matches, for an average of 1.95 goals per match. (Note: The goal tally takes into account the original result of fixtures that were subsequently forfeited, not the awarded scoreline.)

5 goals

- (Portugal national football team) Cristiano Ronaldo

3 goals

- (Serbia national football team) Zoran Tošić

2 goals

- (Denmark national football team) Nicklas Bendtner
- (Portugal national football team) João Moutinho
- (Serbia national football team) Adem Ljajić

1 goal

- (Albania national football team) Bekim Balaj
- (Albania national football team) Berat Djimsiti
- (Albania national football team) Shkëlzen Gashi
- (Albania national football team) Ermir Lenjani
- (Albania national football team) Mërgim Mavraj
- (Albania national football team) Armando Sadiku
- (Armenia national football team) Robert Arzumanyan
- (Armenia national football team) Henrikh Mkhitaryan
- (Armenia national football team) Hrayr Mkoyan
- (Armenia national football team) Marcos Pizzelli
- (Denmark national football team) Pierre-Emile Højbjerg
- (Denmark national football team) Thomas Kahlenberg
- (Denmark national football team) Simon Kjær
- (Denmark national football team) Jakob Poulsen
- (Denmark national football team) Yussuf Poulsen
- (Denmark national football team) Lasse Vibe
- (Portugal national football team) Ricardo Carvalho
- (Portugal national football team) Fábio Coentrão
- (Portugal national football team) Nani
- (Portugal national football team) Miguel Veloso
- (Serbia national football team) Aleksandar Kolarov
- (Serbia national football team) Nemanja Matić

1 own goal

- (Albania national football team) Mërgim Mavraj (against Armenia)
- (Armenia national football team) Levon Hayrapetyan (against Serbia)
- (Armenia national football team) Kamo Hovhannisyan (against Albania)

== Discipline ==
A player was automatically suspended for the next match for the following offences:

- Receiving a red card (red card suspensions could be extended for serious offences)
- Receiving three yellow cards in three different matches, as well as after fifth and any subsequent yellow card (yellow card suspensions were carried forward to the play-offs, but not the finals or any other future international matches)

The following suspensions were served during the qualifying matches:

Team	Player	Offence(s)	Suspended for match(es)
Albania	Ansi Agolli	(yellow card) vs Serbia (14 October 2014); (yellow card) vs Denmark (4 September 2015); (yellow card) vs Serbia (8 October 2015)	vs Armenia (11 October 2015)
Armenia	Hovhannes Hambardzumyan	(yellow card) (yellow-red card) vs Albania (29 March 2015)	vs Portugal (13 June 2015)
Portugal	Tiago	(yellow card) (yellow-red card) vs Armenia (13 June 2015)	vs Albania (7 September 2015)

Portugal coach Fernando Santos was to serve an eight-match touchline ban for unsporting conduct towards the match officials when he was in charge of Greece against Costa Rica in the 2014 FIFA World Cup round of 16 match. The ban was temporarily suspended by the Court of Arbitration for Sport until the final appeal. On 23 March 2015, the CAS ruled that his ban should be reduced to four games, with two suspended during a six-month probationary period, meaning he missed Portugal's matches against Serbia (29 March 2015) and Armenia (13 June 2015).
