= Gianni De Biasi =

Italian football manager (born 1956)

Personal information
- Full name: Giovanni De Biasi
- Date of birth: 16 June 1956 (age 70)
- Place of birth: Sarmede, Italy
- Height: 1.83 m (6 ft 0 in)
- Position: Midfielder

Senior career*
Years	Team	Apps	(Gls)
1974–1975	Treviso	25	(5)
1975–1976	Inter Milan	0	(0)
1976–1977	→ Reggiana (loan)	24	(0)
1977–1978	→ Pescara (loan)	24	(0)
1978–1983	Brescia	161	(14)
1983–1986	Palermo	105	(9)
1986–1987	Vicenza	19	(0)
1987–1989	Treviso	51	(3)
1989–1990	Bassano Virtus 55	0	(0)
Total		409	(31)

Managerial career
- 1990–1991: Bassano Virtus 55 (youth team)
- 1991–1992: Vicenza (youth team)
- 1992–1993: Vastese
- 1993–1996: Carpi
- 1996: Cosenza
- 1997: Cosenza
- 1997–1999: SPAL
- 1999–2003: Modena
- 2003–2005: Brescia
- 2005–2006: Torino
- 2007: Torino
- 2007–2008: Levante
- 2008: Torino
- 2009–2010: Udinese
- 2011–2017: Albania
- 2017: Alavés
- 2020–2023: Azerbaijan
- * Club domestic league appearances and goals

Giovanni "Gianni" De Biasi (Italian pronunciation: [ˈdʒanni de ˈbjaːzi], Albanian: Xhovani "Xhani" De Biazi, born 16 June 1956) is an Italian football coach and former player. He holds dual Italian and Albanian citizenship. De Biasi was the first coach of the Albania national team to lead the team to qualify for a major tournament, namely UEFA Euro 2016.

== Playing career ==
De Biasi was born in Sarmede, Treviso, Italy. A midfielder, he started his professional playing career for Inter Milan; he was part of the first team squad but, despite this, never played for the nerazzurri and was then loaned to Serie C team Reggiana in 1975 and newly promoted Serie A club Pescara Calcio one year later. He was sold to Brescia in 1977 as partial compensation for the signing of Evaristo Beccalossi by Inter. De Biasi played in Brescia for five seasons, only one of them in Serie A. He then moved to Palermo in 1983, but abruptly left it three years later following the cancellation of the Sicilian club in the summer of 1986. This was followed by a single season with Vicenza and two Serie C2 seasons for Treviso. De Biasi retired from active football in 1990, after a Serie D season with Bassano.

== Coaching career ==
=== Clubs in Italy ===
In 1990, De Biasi became youth team coach for Bassano; in 1991, he was appointed by Vicenza to coach the allievi nazionali youth squad. In 1992, De Biasi made his debut as first team coach, being boss of Serie C2 club Vastese (now Pro Vasto); this was followed by three seasons as Carpi boss. In 1996, De Biasi was appointed coach of Serie B club Cosenza, but was fired on Christmas' eve day. After a two-year spell at SPAL, De Biasi was contacted and hired by Serie C1 club Modena in 2000; with the canarini, De Biasi obtained two consecutive promotions that brought Modena back in Serie A after 38 years. For his achievements with Modena, he was the awarded the Silver Bench award in 2002. He left Modena in 2003, after having led his club to safety, achieving an impressive 13th-place finish in the Serie A table, and signed for Brescia, where he had the opportunity to coach Roberto Baggio in his last playing season of his career. He was sacked during the 2004–05 season.

In 2005, Torino of Serie B appointed De Biasi as head coach, offering him a squad quickly built in a very few days following the cancellation of the old Torino Calcio club and the forming of a new society, owned by Urbano Cairo. Under De Biasi, Torino obtained immediate Serie A promotion, after having defeated Mantova on play-offs. De Biasi, initially confirmed as head coach also for the 2006–07 Serie A campaign, was however sacked three days before the first matchday and replaced by Alberto Zaccheroni. On 26 February 2007 Torino chairman Cairo decided to sack Zaccheroni too and recall De Biasi at the helm of the granata, where he helped them to avoid relegation.

After several rumours regarding a possible move to La Liga side Levante, he was announced on 9 October 2007 to have reached an agreement with the Spanish side, where he joined fellow Italians Damiano Tommasi, Christian Riganò, Marco Storari and Bruno Cirillo. He did not manage to save the club from relegation, mainly because of financial struggles which questioned the club's own survival and led to them selling several key players during the January transfer window. Despite the lack of top-quality players, and as the risk of bankruptcy loomed, he led the team to some unexpected victories, displaying linearity and tactical discipline that gained him the love of the Spanish fans and esteem of the critics; in one of its editions, the popular sports daily As declared him the best coach in the championship.

On 16 April 2008, he was announced by Torino to replace Walter Novellino for the five final matchdays, with the aim to save the club from relegation once again. Once again, De Biasi saved the team. On 8 December 2008, he was sacked after fifteen matches, blamed by the team's owner for the fact that Torino was once again struggling to avoid relegation. However, despite hiring and then dismissing two further coaches, the team were still relegated at the end of the season.

On 22 December 2009, Udinese dismissed manager Pasquale Marino and appointed De Biasi to take charge of the struggling team from North-Eastern Italy. However, results did not particularly improve under his tenure as head coach, and De Biasi himself was removed from his post on 21 February 2010, with Marino being brought back at the helm of the club.

=== Albania national team ===
On 14 December 2011, following Josip Kuže's dismissal, the Albanian Football Association announced to have agreed a two-year deal with De Biasi as new head coach of the national team for the 2014 FIFA World Cup qualifiers. His first match as Albania manager was a 2–1 defeat to Georgia, during which Edgar Çani, one of his innovations, scored after three minutes for the Red and Blacks.

In May 2012, in two friendlies against Qatar and Iran, De Biasi launched new players such as Mërgim Mavraj, Mërgim Brahimi, and Etrit Berisha, whereas in the friendly against Moldova, scheduled on 16 August 2012, he convocated three young players, Erjon Dushku, Erjon Vuçaj and Renato Arapi. Albania won narrowly against Iran and Qatar, but was held by Moldova at home.

De Biasi won his first competitive match on 7 September 2012, defeating Cyprus 2–0 in their opening 2014 World Cup Qualifying match, in Tirana, with goals by Sadiku, Çani and Bogdani. This match saw two newcomers to the Albania's midfield, Alban Meha and Burim Kukeli, who played for the entire match. On 22 March 2013, he led Albania with his schemes and defensive tactical to a 1–0 historic win against Norway in Oslo, moving Albania into joint second place in the group with nine points, ahead of Norway who were on seven points.

De Biasi started UEFA Euro 2016 qualifier with a 1–0 win over group favorites Portugal. This victory was described as historic by Albanian and international medias, and caused the resignation of Portugal's coach, Paulo Bento. In the next qualifying match against Denmark at the newly renovated Elbasan Arena, Albania was on lead until 81st minute when Lasse Vibe levelled the score to 1–1. The Albanian goal was scored by Ermir Lenjani, another player brought by De Biasi in 2013.

On 29 March 2015, in the fourth qualifying match against Armenia, Albania was behind after only four minutes, but with the clever substitutes of De Biasi, Albania come back and won the match 2–1 thanks to goals from Mërgim Mavraj and Shkëlzen Gashi, a player who came on in the 46th minute. This match caused the resignation of Armenia's coach, Bernard Challandes.

On 13 June 2015, Albania beat one-time World Champions France at Elbasan Arena for the first time in history thanks to a free-kick from Ergys Kaçe. For this match, De Biasi left some of the starter players out, in order to rest. The victory subsequently allowed Albania to climb 15 positions to 36th place in the July 2015 FIFA world rankings for the first time in history.

Gianni De Biasi became the first coach of the Albanian national side to lead the team to qualify for the UEFA European Championship, when the team sealed qualification for UEFA Euro 2016 on 10 October 2015. For this achievement De Biasi, as well as the entire team were bestowed the Honor of Nation Order by Albania's President Bujar Nishani.

At the end of 2015, De Biasi was included for the first time in the top ten IFFHS National Coaches of the World, ranking sixth. On 9 January 2016, he agreed a contract extension with Albania, signing until 2017, also his new salary was increased by 60% of his former salary. On 7 March 2016, he was awarded by FIGC with the Special Golden Bench award for "spreading the values of the Italian school coaches in the world".

In UEFA Euro 2016, Albania was pitted against France, Switzerland and Romania in Group A. After losing narrowly to Switzerland in their opening game, Albania held hosts and favourites France scoreless until the 89th minute before conceding two late goals. In their final group game, a 43rd minute headed goal by Sadiku was the only goal in a 1–0 win and gave them a historic first victory in the European Championships, helping them to a third-place finish in the group.

Following the elimination of Albania from UEFA Euro 2016, De Biasi confirmed himself that he would stay at Albania for the qualifiers of the 2018 FIFA World Cup.

On 14 June 2017, De Biasi announced his resignation in a joint press conference with the President of the Albanian Football Federation, where he departed as the best manager in Albanian football history.

=== Alavés ===
On 22 September 2017, De Biasi was appointed manager of Spanish club Alavés. He was later sacked on 27 November of the same year.

=== Azerbaijan national team ===
On 10 July 2020, De Biasi was confirmed as the new coach of Azerbaijan. Later that month, on 30 July, he signed a two-year contract with the Azerbaijani FA, taking him through the 2022 World Cup qualification.

On 22 November 2023, De Biasi was sacked by the decision of the board of AFFA.

== Personal life ==
On 28 March 2015, De Biasi obtained Albanian citizenship.

Following Albania's historic participation at UEFA Euro 2016, De Biasi was among the members of the national team who were issued diplomatic passports by the Albanian government in recognition of their achievement.

== Managerial statistics ==
As of match played 19 November 2023

Managerial record by team and tenure
Team	Nat	From	To	Record							
Team	Nat	From	To	G	W	D	L	GF	GA	GD	Win %
Vastese	(Italy)	23 June 1992	29 June 1993	36	11	16	9	32	32	+0	30.56
Carpi	(Italy)	29 June 1993	28 May 1996	122	37	47	38	128	131	−3	30.33
Cosenza	(Italy)	11 June 1996	23 December 1996	17	4	6	7	18	24	−6	23.53
Cosenza	(Italy)	2 April 1997	17 June 1997	11	3	6	2	16	17	−1	27.27
SPAL	(Italy)	17 June 1997	18 May 1999	90	43	27	20	107	55	+52	47.78
Modena	(Italy)	1 November 1999	5 June 2003	151	71	45	35	192	138	+54	47.02
Brescia	(Italy)	5 June 2003	8 February 2005	65	15	23	27	77	98	−21	23.08
Torino	(Italy)	1 September 2005	7 September 2006	48	24	14	10	62	39	+23	50.00
Torino	(Italy)	26 February 2007	1 June 2007	14	5	3	6	9	13	−4	35.71
Levante	(Spain)	10 October 2007	16 April 2008	29	7	4	18	26	49	−23	24.14
Torino	(Italy)	16 April 2008	8 December 2008	22	7	3	12	24	34	−10	31.82
Udinese	(Italy)	22 December 2009	21 February 2010	11	3	3	5	12	16	−4	27.27
Albania	(Albania)	14 December 2011	14 June 2017	51	20	10	21	56	49	+7	39.22
Alavés	(Spain)	24 September 2017	27 November 2017	8	3	0	5	7	12	−5	37.50
Azerbaijan	(Azerbaijan)	11 July 2020	22 November 2023	39	10	8	21	34	56	−22	25.64
Total				714	263	215	236	800	763	+37	36.83
