= Ermir Lenjani =

Albanian footballer (born 1989)

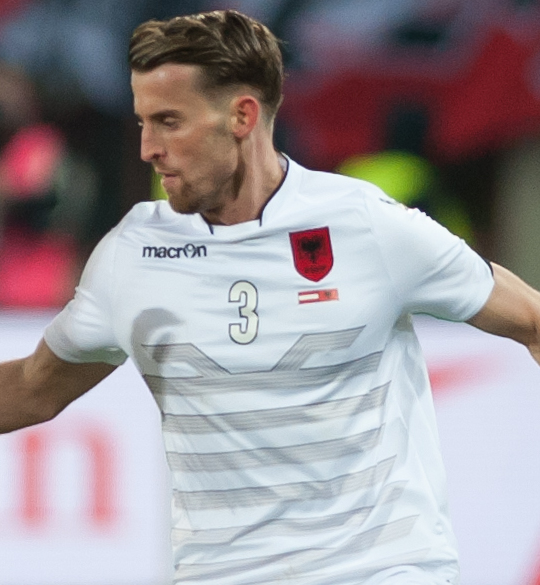
- Lenjani with Albania in March 2016

Personal information
- Full name: Ermir Limon Lenjani
- Date of birth: 5 August 1989 (age 37)
- Place of birth: Karaçevë, Kamenica, SFR Yugoslavia
- Height: 1.75 m (5 ft 9 in)
- Positions: Defender; midfielder

Team information
- Current team: Schaffhausen
- Number: 3

Youth career
- 2001–2004: Tössfeld
- 2004–2009: Winterthur

Senior career*
Years	Team	Apps	(Gls)
2006–2012	Winterthur U21	43	(10)
2009–2012	Winterthur	96	(17)
2010–2011	→ Grasshoppers (loan)	6	(0)
2010	→ Grasshoppers U21 (loan)	5	(2)
2013–2015	St. Gallen	48	(2)
2015–2017	Rennes	6	(0)
2015–2017	Rennes B	5	(0)
2015–2016	→ Nantes (loan)	20	(1)
2015–2016	→ Nantes B (loan)	1	(0)
2017–2020	Sion	83	(14)
2020–2022	Grasshoppers	61	(1)
2022–2023	Ümraniyespor	18	(0)
2024–	Schaffhausen	63	(3)

International career
2013–2022	Albania	45	(5)
- * Club domestic league appearances and goals as of 30 September 2026

Ermir Limon Lenjani (born 5 August 1989) is a professional footballer who plays as a defender or midfielder for Schaffhausen in the Swiss Promotion League.

A product of Winterthur's academy, he began his senior career in Switzerland, including a loan spell at Grasshoppers, before establishing himself in the Swiss Super League with St. Gallen. He later played in Ligue 1 with Rennes and Nantes, before returning to Switzerland, where he represented Sion and Grasshoppers. He also spent a season in Turkey with Ümraniyespor before returning to Swiss football in 2024 with Schaffhausen.

Born in Kosovo, Lenjani made his debut for the Albania national team in 2013, going on to earn 44 caps and score five goals between 2013 and 2022. He was a regular starter during UEFA Euro 2016 qualifying, helping Albania qualify for their first major international tournament, where he featured in all three group-stage matches.

== Club career ==
=== Early career ===
Born in Kosovo, Lenjani moved to Switzerland with his family during childhood, where he began playing football and, at the age of 12, joined Tössfeld's youth teams, spending around two years there before entering the Winterthur academy. In 2007, he was promoted to Winterthur's reserve team (U21), competing in the third-tier 1. Liga Promotion, where he made 41 league appearances and scored nine goals over the following two and a half seasons.

=== Winterthur: breakthrough and loan ===
Lenjani broke into the first team during the second half of the 2008–09 Swiss Challenge League season. He made his senior debut on 9 November 2008 against Schaffhausen on matchday 18, playing the final 41 minutes of a 3–0 defeat and receiving a yellow card. He established himself as a regular in the first team for the remainder of the season, making 11 more league appearances, mostly as a starter, despite missing four matches through suspension following a red card. On 8 March 2009, he scored his first senior goals in a 4–2 away win over Thun, netting the opening and final goals for Winterthur. He scored again on 16 May, equalising in the 34th minute of a 4–1 comeback win against Locarno.

During the 2009–10 Swiss Challenge League season, Lenjani remained a regular starter, featuring regularly through matchday 29 and often playing the full 90 minutes. On 5 December 2009, he scored his first goals of the season in a 4–4 away draw against Wohlen, opening the scoring in the 20th minute before restoring Winterthur's lead at 2–1 in the 34th minute. He scored his fourth league goal on 17 March 2010, putting Winterthur 3–2 ahead in the 53rd minute of a 5–2 home win over Lausanne-Sport. Four days later, he scored the opening goal in the 43rd minute of a 3–0 home victory over Le Mont, with Winterthur adding two more goals in the second half despite playing with ten men, before Lenjani was substituted in the 85th minute. On 8 May, he scored in a 4–1 away win over Locarno before being sent off in the 80th minute after receiving a second yellow card. Winterthur finished third, missing the promotion play-off by three points.

In July 2010, Lenjani joined Grasshopper on loan to gain top-flight experience in the Swiss Super League. He made his debut on 17 July, coming on as a 74th-minute substitute in a 1–1 draw against Neuchâtel Xamax on the opening matchday of the 2010–11 Super League season. During the first half of the season, his involvement spread across the opening months and later returning to action in October and November, making six league appearances, including one start. On 17 October, he scored twice in a 12–0 victory over Gumefens/Sorens in the Swiss Cup round of 32.

Lenjani returned to Winterthur for the second half of the season and quickly re-established himself as a regular starter, playing the vast majority of available minutes during that period. He marked his return with a goal on 20 February 2011, equalising in the 60th minute of a 2–1 defeat to Chiasso. A week later, he opened the scoring in a 1–1 draw against Wohlen. On 3 April, he scored in a 3–3 away draw with Servette. He scored his fourth and final goal of the season on 7 May in a 4–1 defeat away to Locarno.

During the 2011–12 Swiss Challenge League season, Lenjani missed the start of the campaign but returned to the starting line-up and, from matchday 6 onwards, was an ever-present figure, while missing only matchday 17 through suspension after accumulating three bookings. On 5 December 2011, he scored a stoppage-time winner in a 2–1 away victory over Biel/Bienne. He made 25 appearances and scored two goals as Winterthur finished fourth, narrowly missing the promotion play-off. He also featured in the Swiss Cup, helping the club reach the semi-finals before a 2–1 defeat to Basel.

In the first half of the 2012–13 Swiss Challenge League season, Lenjani featured regularly, making 16 appearances and scoring two goals as Winterthur remained among the league's leading teams through matchday 18.

=== St. Gallen ===
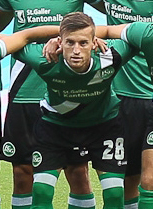
Lenjani lining up with St. Gallen

On 14 December 2012, Swiss Super League club St. Gallen announced the signing of Lenjani on a contract until June 2015, effective from January 2013. He made his debut on 16 February 2013, coming on as a 65th-minute substitute in a 1–0 defeat to Sion on matchday 20 of the 2012–13 Swiss Super League. He was used sparingly for the remainder of the season but started the club's final two league matches when was secured a place in the UEFA Europa League play-offs.

In the 2013–14 season, Lenjani established himself as an undisputed starter, playing the full 90 minutes in each of the team's opening four Super League matches; his performances earned him his first international call-up to the Albania national team in August 2013 for a friendly. On 22 August, he made his UEFA competition debut, playing the full match in a 1–1 draw against Spartak Moscow in the first leg of the Europa League play-off round. He also played the full 90 minutes in the return leg, as St. Gallen won 4–2 away to secure a 5–3 aggregate victory and qualify for the group stage. Lenjani played every minute of the group stage campaign, as the club opened with a 2–0 victory over Kuban Krasnodar, followed by four consecutive defeats, before ending the campaign with a 1–0 win over Swansea City.

In league competition, Lenjani remained a regular starter when available, missing only a handful of matches because of squad rotation during the club's Europa League campaign and his international commitments with Albania. On 28 September 2013, he scored his first Super League goal, netting the winner in a 1–0 away victory over Grasshopper and inflicting the league leaders' first defeat of the season. He also featured in the Swiss Cup, helping St. Gallen reach the quarter-finals before being eliminated by Zürich. On 10 May 2014, he scored the equaliser in a 2–2 away draw against Zürich on the final day of the league season.

During the first half of the 2014–15 Swiss Super League season, Lenjani made 12 league appearances, completing 10 full matches and making two substitute appearances. On 3 August 2014, he provided both assists in a 2–1 home comeback win over Luzern, securing the club's first league victory of the season.

=== Rennes ===
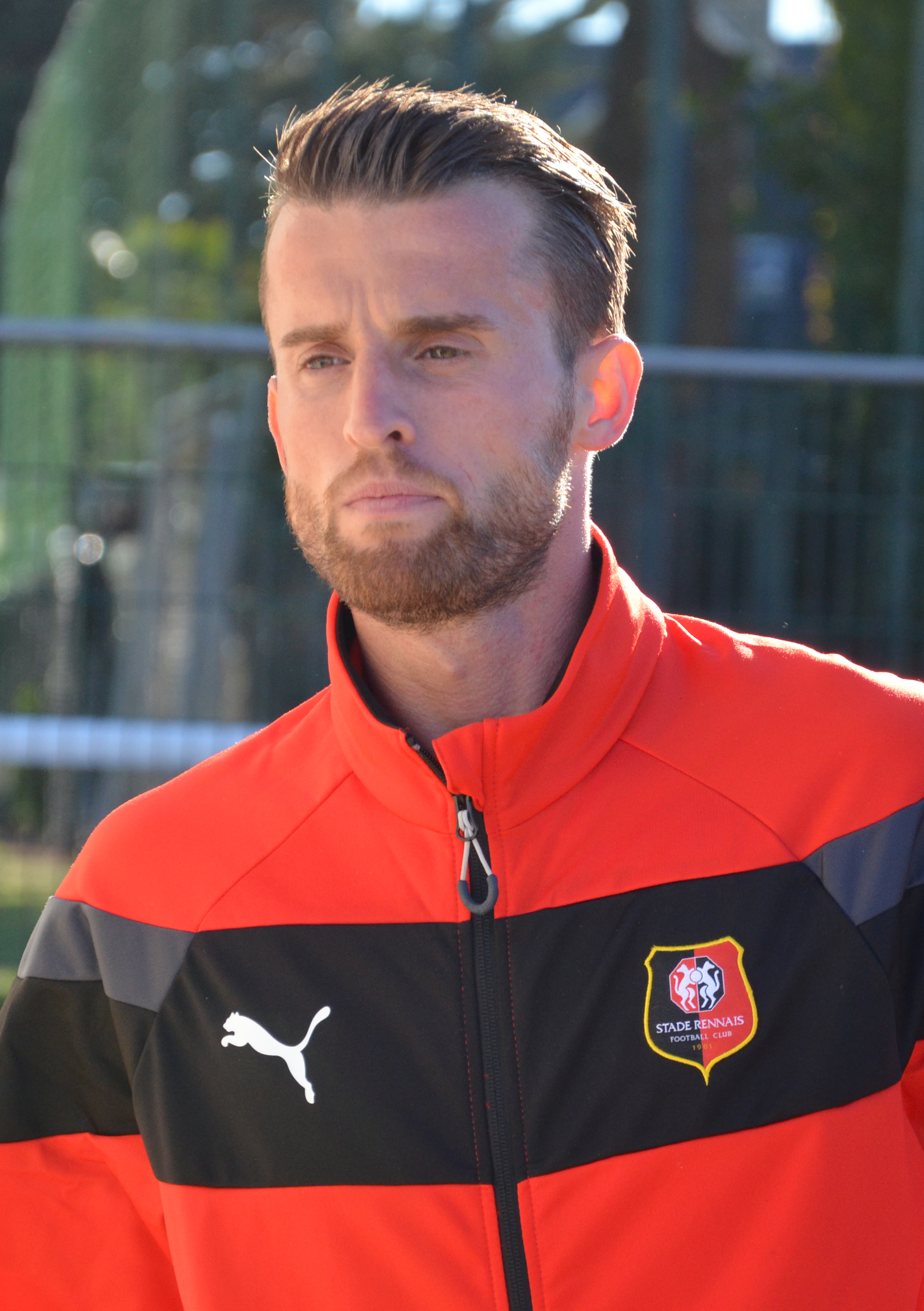
Lenjani with Rennes in July 2016

Amid reported interest from Stuttgart and Verona, Lenjani joined French Ligue 1 club Rennes on 5 January 2015, signing a two-and-a-half-year contract after completing his medical examination. Rennes had monitored him for several months before completing the transfer as cover for the departing Cheikh M'Bengue during the 2015 Africa Cup of Nations. He was presented two days later and assigned the number 19 shirt. He made his debut on 13 January, starting the Coupe de la Ligue quarter-final against Bastia before being sent off in the 76th minute, leaving Rennes with nine men in an eventual 3–1 defeat. He made his Ligue 1 debut on 7 February as a 71st-minute substitute in a 1–1 draw with Marseille, before making his first league start a week later in a 2–1 defeat away to Toulouse. Following M'Bengue's return from international duty, he dropped down the pecking order and made only limited first-team appearances. He later missed several weeks with a thigh injury before returning to the matchday squad near the end of the season.

==== Loan to Nantes ====
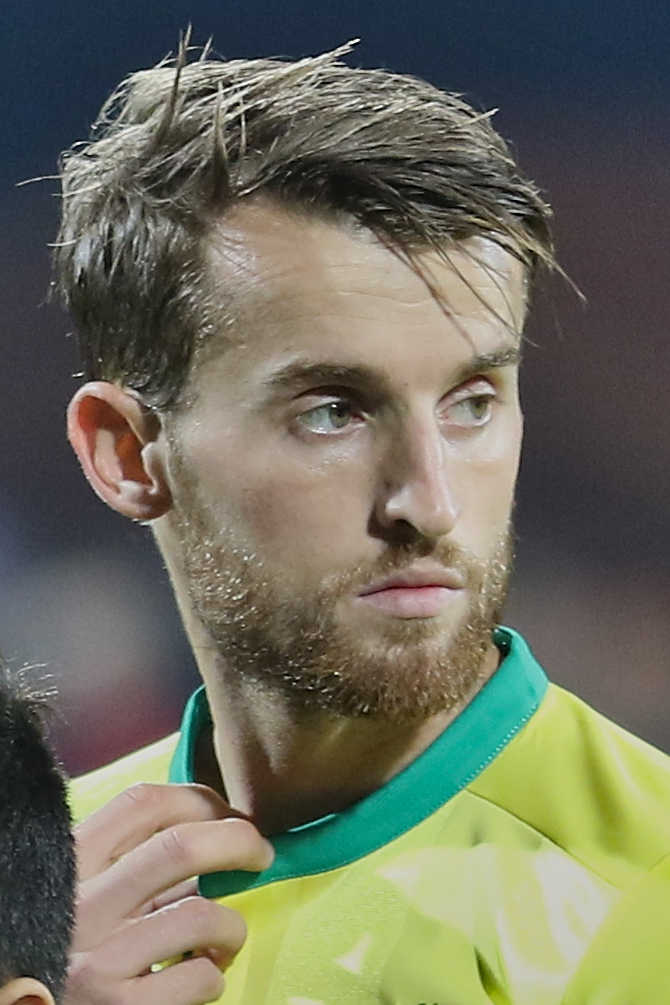
Lenjani playing with Nantes

On 17 August 2015, Lenjani joined fellow Ligue 1 club Nantes on a season-long loan with an option to buy. He made his debut five days later, scoring the winning goal in a 1–0 victory over Stade de Reims, which secured Nantes' first win of the 2015–16 Ligue 1 season. He was subsequently named in L'Équipe's Team of the Week for matchday 3. Lenjani established himself as a regular starter for the remainder of the season despite several absences. He made 24 appearances in all competitions and provided one assist as Nantes finished 14th in the league and reached the quarter-finals of the Coupe de France, where they were eliminated by Sochaux after extra time.

==== Return to Rennes and reserve team ====
Following his return to Rennes ahead of the 2016–17 season, Lenjani saw limited first-team opportunities, making only brief substitute appearances in August before being assigned to the club's reserve team, Rennes B, in the fourth-tier Championnat de France Amateur. He returned to the first team on 14 December 2016, making his first appearance in more than three months by playing the full match in a 7–0 defeat to Monaco in the Coupe de la Ligue round of 16. He remained outside Rennes' first-team plans for the rest of the season despite reported interest during the January transfer window, and his lack of playing time ultimately resulted in his omission from the Albania national team.

=== Sion ===
Lenjani returned to Switzerland on 26 July 2017, signing for Super League club Sion, where he reunited with his former Albania assistant coach Paolo Tramezzani and was assigned the number 33 shirt. He made his debut on 30 July 2017 against Lausanne-Sport, coming on in the 69th minute in a 1–0 away victory. Lenjani quickly established himself as a regular starter, featuring consistently in the league and completing the full 90 minutes in most matches, with only occasional absences due to squad rotation. He scored his first goal for Sion on 13 August in a 9–1 away win over Gränichen in the first round of the Swiss Cup. On 22 September, he scored his first league goal, netting the winner in a 2–1 away victory over Lugano. He added his second league goal on 11 March 2018 in a 7–2 home win against Thun, also providing two assists as Sion moved off the bottom of the table on goal difference. His performance earned him a place in Blick's Team of the Week. Sion finished the season in mid-table.

On 7 October 2018, Lenjani scored his first goal of the Super League season in a 1–1 away draw against Neuchâtel Xamax. Three weeks later, he opened the scoring in a 3–2 defeat away to Young Boys, also forcing an own goal before inadvertently scoring an own goal himself. On 10 February 2019, he equalised in a 2–2 home draw against Lugano. On 4 April, he scored both goals in a 2–1 away victory over Thun, taking his league tally to five for the season. Three days later, he scored after just ten seconds in a 2–2 draw against Luzern, equalling the record for the fastest goal in Swiss football, and also provided an assist. Lenjani finished the league season with five goals and four assists in 25 appearances as Sion placed eighth, one position above the relegation zone. He also featured regularly in the Swiss Cup, helping Sion reach the quarter-finals, where he provided an assist in a 4–2 extra-time defeat to Basel.

On 1 September 2019, Lenjani scored his second league goal of the season, lobbing the goalkeeper in the 17th minute to secure a 1–0 away victory over Thun. He then provided an assist in a 2–1 victory over Neuchâtel Xamax as Sion extended their winning streak to five league matches, but the run was followed by six consecutive defeats, during which he scored twice and provided another assist. He found the net on 6 October, heading home an 83rd-minute equaliser in an eventual 2–1 defeat to Lugano, and again four days later, opening the scoring in the 13th minute of a 4–2 away defeat to Zürich. Sion returned to winning ways on matchday 16, but collected only three draws from the following seven league matches, during which Lenjani added another goal, before the season was suspended in February due to the COVID-19 pandemic.

In March 2020, Lenjani was among nine players released by Sion after refusing to accept wage reductions during the suspension period. He rejoined the club the following month after agreeing to revised financial terms and subsequently entered negotiations over a contract extension. Following the resumption of the season, he scored on 24 June 2020 to earn a 1–1 home draw against Servette, having earlier won a penalty that was missed by a teammate. In July, Sion recorded two wins and three draws, with Lenjani contributing two assists, to finish eighth for the second consecutive season, one point clear of relegation. He also started every Swiss Cup match as Sion reached the semi-finals before losing 3–1 to Young Boys on 9 August 2020.

=== Return to Grasshopper ===
On 11 September 2020, Swiss Challenge League club Grasshopper announced the signing of Lenjani on a two-year contract, strengthening the squad ahead of the new season and marking his return to the club after nine years. He established himself as a regular starter during the 2020–21 Swiss Challenge League season and scored his first league goal for the club on 23 April 2021, finding the net in a 3–1 comeback victory over Thun that extended Grasshopper's lead at the top of the table. Grasshopper won the league title and secured promotion to the Swiss Super League, with Lenjani making important contributions in both defensive and attacking phases. His performances earned him a place in the Team of the Season.

On matchday 3 of the 2021–22 Swiss Super League season, Lenjani provided an assist in a 3–1 victory over Lausanne-Sport on 7 August 2021. After missing the following three matches, he returned to the lineup and recorded assists in three consecutive league games between 23 September and 2 October 2021, helping Grasshopper secure one draw and two victories during that period. He finished the season with eight assists and one goal in 29 league appearances. Grasshopper ended the campaign in eighth place with 40 points, level with Luzern but ahead on the head-to-head tiebreaker, thereby avoiding the relegation play-out. His contract expired at the end of the season and was not renewed by the club.

=== Ümraniyespor ===
On 9 June 2022, Lenjani signed a one-year contract with Turkish club Ümraniyespor, with an option for an additional year. He made his competitive debut on 8 August 2022, providing an assist in a 3–3 away draw against Fenerbahçe in the opening match of the 2022–23 Süper Lig season. He started the first 11 league matches of the season, playing almost every available minute and recording another assist, but Ümraniyespor collected only two points during that period, and Lenjani subsequently lost his place in the starting lineup for much of the remainder of the campaign. Ümraniyespor finished third from bottom with 30 points and were relegated. After his contract expired, Lenjani returned to Switzerland in the summer of 2023, aiming to continue his career there.

=== Schaffhausen ===
On 17 January 2024, Lenjani returned to the Swiss Challenge League after signing for Schaffhausen. He made his debut on 3 March, coming on as a 74th-minute substitute with Schaffhausen trailing 1–0 in an eventual 3–2 defeat to Vaduz. During the second half of the 2023–24 season, he made three further appearances in May, including one start, as Schaffhausen finished second from bottom and avoided relegation.

In the following season, Lenjani established himself as a regular starter, making 26 starts and two substitute appearances during the 2024–25 Challenge League campaign and playing more than 2,050 minutes across the 36 matchdays; Schaffhausen recorded seven wins and seven draws but finished bottom of the table and were relegated to the Swiss Promotion League. He also featured in all three matches of the Swiss Cup, helping Schaffhausen record two victories before elimination in the round of 16 following a 1–0 defeat to Young Boys.

On 9 July 2025, Schaffhausen announced that Lenjani had extended his contract, allowing the club to retain his experience for the following season. He began the 2025–26 Promotion League season by scoring in stoppage time during Schaffhausen's 2–2 away draw against Kreuzlingen on 2 August 2025, after entering the match as a substitute. On matchday 32, he recorded both a goal and an assist in Schaffhausen's 4–2 victory over Lugano II on 16 May 2026. Lenjani made 16 starts and nine substitute appearances as Schaffhausen collected 53 points and finished seventh in the league standings.

On 24 June 2026, Schaffhausen confirmed that Lenjani would remain with the club for the 2026–27 season after extending his contract.

== International career ==
Lenjani received his first call-up to the Albania national team in August 2013 from head coach Gianni De Biasi. On 8 October 2013, he was granted Albanian citizenship, making him eligible to represent the country in international competitions. He was included in Albania's squads for the final two matches of the 2014 FIFA World Cup qualifying campaign against Switzerland and Cyprus, but remained an unused substitute in both fixtures. Lenjani made his international debut on 15 November 2013, playing the full 90 minutes in a goalless friendly draw against Belarus.

=== Euro 2016 campaign ===
Lenjani established himself as a regular starter during the UEFA Euro 2016 qualifying campaign, playing 74 minutes in Albania's opening match, a historic 1–0 away victory over Portugal on 7 September 2014. On 11 October, he scored his first international goal in a 1–1 draw against Denmark. Three days later, he started against Serbia in a match abandoned in the 42nd minute following crowd disturbances and incidents involving players and home supporters. UEFA initially awarded Serbia a 3–0 victory and deducted three points from the Serbian team, but the Court of Arbitration for Sport overturned the result in July 2015 and awarded Albania a 3–0 forfeit victory.

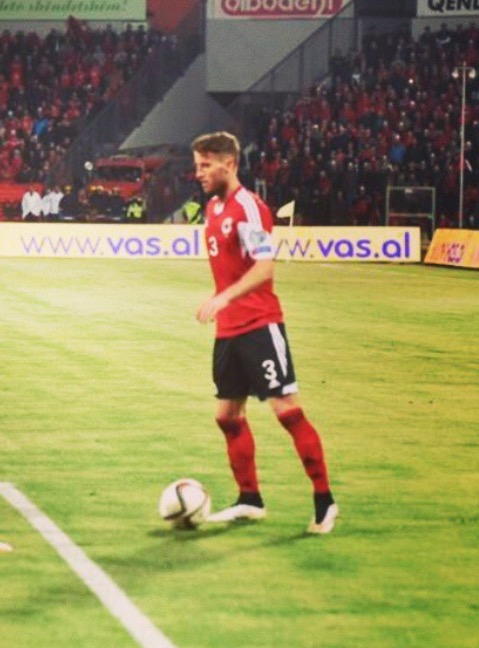
Lenjani playing for Albania during a UEFA Euro 2016 qualifying match

In Albania's fourth qualifier against Armenia on 29 March 2015, Lenjani came on at half-time while carrying a minor injury, with his team trailing 1–0. He won the free kick that led to an Armenian player's dismissal and later assisted Shkëlzen Gashi's winning goal in a 2–1 comeback victory. He featured regularly for the remainder of the qualifying campaign, but was an unused substitute in the decisive final match against Armenia on 11 October, when Albania secured a 3–0 victory and qualified for its first major international tournament. On 26 March 2016, he scored his second international goal in a 2–1 friendly defeat to Austria.

On 21 May 2016, Lenjani was named in Albania's preliminary 27-man squad for UEFA Euro 2016. He scored in a 3–1 friendly victory over Qatar before being included in the final 23-man squad. During the group stage, he started all three matches, playing the full 90 minutes in defeats to Switzerland and hosts France, before being substituted in the 77th minute of Albania's 1–0 victory over Romania. Albania finished third in the group with three points but were eliminated after ranking last among the third-placed teams.

=== Post–Euro 2016 ===
During the 2018 FIFA World Cup qualification campaign, Lenjani remained a regular member of the Albania squad but lost his starting place to the in-form Jahmir Hyka as his club playing time declined. He made only one qualifying start, against Spain in October 2016, before being substituted at half-time. Competition for a place in the squad increased following the emergence of Azdren Llullaku, and after the appointment of Christian Panucci in 2017, Lenjani was omitted from the manager's first squad in favour of Hysen Memolla as the alternative at left-back.

After being omitted from the squad for the opening matches of the UEFA Euro 2020 qualifying campaign in March 2019, Lenjani stated that he would not accept further international call-ups while Panucci remained in charge. Following Panucci's dismissal after Albania's opening defeat, Lenjani made himself available for the national team again. Under new manager Edoardo Reja, he was selected for the remaining qualifiers, starting five matches as Albania recorded two victories but failed to qualify for the tournament.

Lenjani retained his starting role during the 2022 FIFA World Cup qualification campaign and scored the winning goal in Albania's 1–0 opening victory over Andorra in March 2021. However, a mid-campaign injury sidelined him for several weeks, limiting him to two substitute appearances for the remainder of the qualifiers. Albania finished third in the group, two points behind Poland, and missed the play-offs. Lenjani returned to the starting lineup in Albania's final match of the 2022–23 UEFA Nations League B campaign and scored the opening goal in a 1–1 draw against Iceland on 27 September 2022.

Following the appointment of Sylvinho in 2023, Lenjani was included in the matchday squad for Albania's opening UEFA Euro 2024 qualifying match against Poland on 27 March but was not selected again as Albania qualified for the tournament finals. He announced his retirement from international football on 3 October 2024, ending a 10-year career with the national team in which he earned 44 caps and scored five goals.

== Personal life ==
Lenjani was born in Karaçevë of Kamenica, a District of Gjilan in Kosovo, to Albanian parents originally from Prokuplje. He holds dual citizenship of Switzerland and Albania.

Following Albania's historic participation at UEFA Euro 2016, Lenjani was among the members of the national team who were issued diplomatic passports by the Albanian government in recognition of their achievement.

Lenjani married his partner Herolinda in July 2019.

== Career statistics ==
=== Club ===
As of 26 June 2026

Appearances and goals by club, season and competition
Club	Season	League			Cup		Europe (Note: Appearances in UEFA Champions League and UEFA Europa League)		Other (Note: Appearances in Swiss Super Cup)		Total	
Club	Season	Division	Apps	Goals	Apps	Goals	Apps	Goals	Apps	Goals	Apps	Goals
Winterthur U21	2006–07	1. Liga Promotion	4	0	—		—		—		4	0
Winterthur U21	2007–08	1. Liga Promotion	20	6	—		—		—		20	6
Winterthur U21	2008–09	1. Liga Promotion	17	4	—		—		—		17	4
Winterthur U21	2009–10	1. Liga Promotion	1	0	—		—		—		1	0
Winterthur U21	2011–12	1. Liga Promotion	1	0	—		—		—		1	0
Winterthur U21	Total		43	10	—		—		—		43	10
Winterthur	2008–09	Swiss Challenge League	12	3	0	0	—		—		12	3
Winterthur	2009–10	Swiss Challenge League	29	6	3	1	—		—		32	7
Winterthur	2010–11	Swiss Challenge League	14	4	0	0	—		—		14	4
Winterthur	2011–12	Swiss Challenge League	25	2	5	0	—		—		30	2
Winterthur	2012–13	Swiss Challenge League	16	2	2	0	—		—		18	2
Winterthur	Total		96	17	10	1	—		—		106	18
Grasshoppers	2010–11	Swiss Challenge League	6	0	1	2	—		—		7	2
Grasshoppers U21	2010–11	1. Liga Promotion	5	2	—		—		—		5	2
St. Gallen	2012–13	Swiss Super League	7	0	0	0	—		—		7	0
St. Gallen	2013–14	Swiss Super League	29	2	4	2	8	0	—		41	4
St. Gallen	2014–15	Swiss Super League	12	0	2	0	—		—		14	0
St. Gallen	Total		48	2	6	2	8	0	—		62	4
Rennes	2014–15	Ligue 1	3	0	2	0	—		—		5	0
Rennes	2015–16	Ligue 1	1	0	—		—		—		1	0
Rennes	2016–17	Ligue 1	2	0	1	0	—		—		3	0
Rennes	Total		6	0	3	0	—		—		9	0
Rennes B	2014–15	CFA 2	3	0	—		—		—		3	0
Rennes B	2016–17	CFA	2	0	—		—		—		2	0
Nantes	2015–16	Ligue 1	20	1	3	0	—		—		23	1
Nantes B	2015–16	CFA	1	0	—		—		—		1	0
Sion	2017–18	Swiss Super League	29	2	2	3	—		—		31	5
Sion	2018–19	Swiss Super League	25	6	3	0	—		—		28	6
Sion	2019–20	Swiss Super League	32	6	4	0	—		—		36	6
Grasshoppers	2020–21	Swiss Challenge League	32	1	0	0	—		—		32	1
Grasshoppers	2021–22	Swiss Super League	29	0	1	0	—		—		30	0
Ümraniyespor	2022–23	Super Lig	14	0	3	0	—		—		17	0
Schaffhausen	2023–24	Swiss Challenge League	3	0	—		—		—		3	0
Schaffhausen	2024–25	Swiss Challenge League	28	0	3	0	—		—		31	0
Schaffhausen	2025–26	Promotion League	25	2	2	0	—		—		27	2
Schaffhausen	Total		56	2	5	0	—		—		61	2
Career total			436	47	40	5	8	0	—		484	52

=== International ===
Appearances and goals by national team and year
National team	Year	Apps	Goals	
Albania	2013	1	0	
Albania	2014	7	1	
Albania	2015	7	0	
Albania	2016	9	2	
Albania	2017	2	0	
Albania	2018	5	0	
Albania	2019	8	0	
Albania	2020	2	0	
Albania	2021	9	1	
Albania	2022	7	1	
Albania	Total		45	5

Scores and results list Albania's goal tally first, score column indicates score after each Lenjani goal.

List of international goals scored by Ermir Lenjani
No.	Date	Venue	Cap	Opponent	Score	Result	Competition
1	11 October 2014	Elbasan Arena, Elbasani, Albania	5	Denmark	1–0	1–1	UEFA Euro 2016 qualification
2	26 March 2016	Ernst-Happel-Stadion, Vienna, Austria	16	Austria	1–2	1–2	Friendly
3	29 May 2016	Stadion Hartberg, Hartberg, Austria	17	Qatar	2–1	3–1	Friendly
4	23 March 2021	Estadi Nacional, Andorra La Vella Andorra	51	Andorra	1–0	1–0	2022 FIFA World Cup qualification
5	27 September 2022	Arena Kombëtare, Tirana, Albania	64	Iceland	1–0	1–1	2022–23 UEFA Nations League
