= Albania national football team results (2000–2019) =

This list of the Albania national football team results from 2000 to 2019.

== 2000 ==
6 February Rothmans International Tournament	Albania	3–0	Andorra	Ta' Qali, Malta
14:00 (UTC+1)	Dalipi 63' (pen.); Vata 86'; Zajmi 90'	Report		Stadium: National Stadium; Attendance: 2,500; Referee: Joseph Attard (Malta)

8 February Rothmans International Tournament	Albania	1–0	Azerbaijan	Ta' Qali, Malta
17:00 (UTC+1)	Murati 37'	Report		Stadium: National Stadium; Attendance: 3,000; Referee: Emanuel Zammit (Malta)

10 February Rothmans International Tournament	Malta	0–1	Albania	Ta' Qali, Malta
16:15 (UTC+1)		Report	Sinani 54'	Stadium: National Stadium; Attendance: 3,654; Referee: Xaqani Mammadov (Azerbaijan)

26 April International Friendly	Macedonia	1–0	Albania	Prilep, Macedonia
16:00 (UTC+2)	Serafimovski 36'	Report		Stadium: Gradski Stadion Goce Delčev; Attendance: 3,000; Referee: Ivan Dobrinov (Bulgaria)

15 August International Friendly	Albania	0–0	Cyprus	Tirana, Albania
19:00 (UTC+2)		Report		Stadium: Qemal Stafa Stadium; Attendance: 4,000; Referee: Sašo Lazarevski (Macedonia)

2 September 2002 FIFA World Cup Q	Finland	2–1	Albania	Helsinki, Finland
15:00 (UTC+3)	Litmanen 45'; Riihilahti 67'	Report	Murati 63'	Stadium: Finnair Stadium; Attendance: 10,770; Referee: René Temmink (Netherlands)

11 October 2002 FIFA World Cup Q	Albania	2–0	Greece	Tirana, Albania
19:00 (UTC+2)	Bushi 49'; Fakaj 90+3'	Report		Stadium: Qemal Stafa Stadium; Attendance: 10,200; Referee: Rune Pedersen (Norway)

15 November International Friendly	Albania	3–0	Malta	Tirana, Albania
	Vata 45'; Bogdani 70', 90'	Report		Stadium: Qemal Stafa Stadium; Attendance: 2,000; Referee: Delče Jakimovski (Macedonia)

== 2001 ==
24 March 2002 FIFA World Cup Q	Germany	2–1	Albania	Leverkusen, Germany
20:00 (UTC+1)	Deisler 50'; Klose 87'	Report	Kola 65'	Stadium: BayArena; Attendance: 22,500; Referee: Graziano Cesari (Italy)

28 March 2002 FIFA World Cup Q	Albania	1–3	England	Tirana, Albania
20:30 (UTC+2)	Rraklli 90+3'	Report	Owen 73'; Scholes 85'; Cole 90+5'	Stadium: Qemal Stafa Stadium; Attendance: 19,500; Referee: Alain Hamer (Luxembourg)

25 April International Friendly	Turkey	0–2	Albania	Gaziantep, Turkey
20:15 (UTC+2)		Report	Bushi 58'; Skela 71'	Stadium: Gaziantep Kamil Ocak Stadium; Attendance: 18,000; Referee: Meir Levi (Israel)

2 June 2002 FIFA World Cup Q	Greece	1–0	Albania	Heraklion, Greece
21:00 (UTC+3)	Machlas 70'	Report		Stadium: Theodoros Vardinogiannis Stadium; Attendance: 5,400; Referee: Nikolai Levnikov (Russia)

6 June 2002 FIFA World Cup Q	Albania	0–2	Germany	Tirana, Albania
19:30 (UTC+2)		Report	Rehmer 28'; Ballack 68'	Stadium: Qemal Stafa Stadium; Attendance: 12,800; Referee: Gilles Veissière (France)

1 September 2002 FIFA World Cup Q	Albania	0–2	Finland	Tirana, Albania
19:00 (UTC+2)		Report	Tainio 57'; Kuqi 90'	Stadium: Qemal Stafa Stadium; Attendance: 6,400; Referee: Erol Ersoy (Turkey)

5 September 2002 FIFA World Cup Q	England	2–0	Albania	Newcastle upon Tyne, England
20:00 (UTC+1)	Owen 43'; Fowler 88'	Report		Stadium: St James' Park; Attendance: 51,046; Referee: Juan Fernández Marín (Spain)

== 2002 ==
5 January Bahrain Shoot Soccer Tournament	Albania	0–0	Macedonia	Riffa, Bahrain
19:15 (UTC+3)		Report		Stadium: Bahrain National Stadium; Attendance: 2,000; Referee: Jassim Karim (Bahrain)

7 January Bahrain Shoot Soccer Tournament	Albania	1–1	Finland	Riffa, Bahrain
	Fortuzi 71' (pen.)	Report	Ilola 45'	Stadium: Bahrain National Stadium; Attendance: 4,000; Referee: Abdul Habib (Bahrain)

10 January Bahrain Shoot Soccer Tournament	Bahrain	3–0	Albania	Riffa, Bahrain
	Salem 42'; Salman 63', 72'	Report		Stadium: Bahrain National Stadium; Attendance: 10,000; Referee: Qasim Shaaban (Bahrain)

13 February International Friendly	Luxembourg	0–0	Albania	Hesperange, Luxembourg
20:00 (UTC+1)		Report		Stadium: Stade Alphonse Theis; Attendance: 1,300; Referee: René Rogalla (Switzerland)

13 March International Friendly	Mexico	4–0	Albania	San Diego, United States
	Borgetti 24'; Morales 30'; Bautista 52', 90'	Report		Stadium: Qualcomm Stadium; Attendance: 32,109; Referee: Kevin Stott (USA)

27 March International Friendly	Albania	1–0	Azerbaijan	Tirana, Albania
20:30 (UTC+1)	Tare 39'	Report		Stadium: Qemal Stafa Stadium; Attendance: 3,500; Referee: Emil Božinovski (Macedonia)

17 April International Friendly	Andorra	2–0	Albania	Andorra la Vella, Andorra
	González 34' (pen.); Jiménez 58'	Report		Stadium: Estadi Comunal d'Andorra la Vella; Attendance: 250; Referee: Arturo Daudén Ibáñez (Spain)

12 October UEFA Euro 2004 Q	Albania	1–1	Switzerland	Tirana, Albania
20:00 (UTC+2)	Murati 78'	Report	Yakin 37'	Stadium: Qemal Stafa Stadium; Attendance: 15,000; Referee: Orhan Erdemir (Turkey)

16 October UEFA Euro 2004 Q	Russia	4–1	Albania	Volgograd, Russia
19:00 (UTC+4)	Kerzhakov 3'; Semak 41', 54'; Onopko 52'	Report	Duro 13'	Stadium: Central Stadium; Attendance: 16,000; Referee: Leif Sundell (Sweden)

== 2003 ==
12 February International Friendly	Albania	5–0	Vietnam	Bastia Umbra, Italy
	Bushi 16'; Myrtaj 21', 38'; Dragusha 53'; Pinari 86'	Report		Stadium: Stadio Comunale; Attendance: 100; Referee: Nicola Nicoletti (Italy)

29 March UEFA Euro 2004 Q	Albania	3–1	Russia	Shkodër, Albania
18:00 (UTC+1)	Rraklli 20'; Lala 79'; Tare 82'	Report	Karyaka 72'	Stadium: Loro Boriçi Stadium; Attendance: 12,000; Referee: Paul Allaerts (Belgium)

2 April UEFA Euro 2004 Q	Albania	0–0	Republic of Ireland	Tirana, Albania
18:30 (UTC+2)		Report		Stadium: Qemal Stafa Stadium; Attendance: 20,000; Referee: Stefano Farina (Italy)

30 April International Friendly	Bulgaria	2–0	Albania	Sofia, Bulgaria
18:00 (UTC+3)	Berbatov 3', 34'	Report		Stadium: Vasil Levski National Stadium; Attendance: 7,523; Referee: Karel Vidlák (Czech Republic)

7 June UEFA Euro 2004 Q	Republic of Ireland	2–1	Albania	Dublin, Republic of Ireland
15:00 (UTC+1)	Keane 6'; Aliaj 90' (o.g.)	Report	Skela 7'	Stadium: Lansdowne Road; Attendance: 33,000; Referee: Tomasz Mikulski (Poland)

11 June UEFA Euro 2004 Q	Switzerland	3–2	Albania	Geneva, Switzerland
20:15 (UTC+2)	Haas 10'; Frei 32'; Cabanas 71'	Report	Lala 23'; Skela 86' (pen.)	Stadium: Stade de Genève; Attendance: 26,000; Referee: Steve Bennett (England)

20 August International Friendly	Macedonia	3–1	Albania	Prilep, Macedonia
17:00 (UTC+2)	Naumoski 8'; Pandev 37'; Dimitrovski 77'	Report	Skela 73'	Stadium: Gradski Stadion Goce Delčev; Attendance: 3,000; Referee: Goran Mihaljević (Serbia and Montenegro)

6 September UEFA Euro 2004 Q	Georgia	3–0	Albania	Tbilisi, Georgia
20:00 (UTC+5)	Arveladze 8', 43'; Ashvetia 17'	Report		Stadium: Boris Paichadze National Stadium; Attendance: 18,000; Referee: Nicolai Vollquartz (Denmark)

10 September UEFA Euro 2004 Q	Albania	3–1	Georgia	Tirana, Albania
20:00 (UTC+2)	Hasi 51'; Tare 53'; Bushi 80'	Report	Arveladze 63'	Stadium: Qemal Stafa Stadium; Attendance: 10,500; Referee: Salomir Mircea (Romania)

11 October International Friendly	Portugal	5–3	Albania	Lisbon, Portugal
21:30 (UTC+1)	Figo 8'; Simão 51'; Rui Costa 57'; Pauleta 59'; Miguel 65'	Report	Aliaj 13', 59'; Tare 43'	Stadium: Estádio do Restelo; Attendance: 5,000; Referee: Pascal Garibian (France)

15 November International Friendly	Albania	2–0	Estonia	Tirana, Albania
18:00 (UTC+2)	Aliaj 26'; Bushi 81'	Report		Stadium: Qemal Stafa Stadium; Attendance: 5,000; Referee: Giorgos Douros (Greece)

== 2004 ==
18 February International Friendly	Albania	2–1	Sweden	Tirana, Albania
19:45 (UTC+1)	Skela 67'; Aliaj 75'	Report	Selaković 50'	Stadium: Qemal Stafa Stadium; Attendance: 15,000; Referee: Gianluca Paparesta (Italy)

31 March International Friendly	Albania	2–1	Iceland	Tirana, Albania
	Aliaj 42'; Bushi 78'	Report	Guðjónsson 64'	Stadium: Qemal Stafa Stadium; Attendance: 12,000; Referee: Paolo Bertini (Italy)

28 April International Friendly	Estonia	1–1	Albania	Tallinn, Estonia
21:00 (UTC+3)	Viikmäe 80'	Report	Aliaj 51'	Stadium: A. Le Coq Arena; Attendance: 1,700; Referee: Andrejs Sipailo (Latvia)

18 August International Friendly	Cyprus	2–1	Albania	Limassol, Cyprus
20:00 (UTC+3)	Konstantinou 13' (pen.), 48'	Report	Rraklli 64'	Stadium: Tsirio Stadium; Attendance: 200; Referee: Kostas Kapitanis (Cyprus)

4 September 2006 FIFA World Cup Q	Albania	2–1	Greece	Tirana, Albania
20:45 (UTC+2)	Murati 2'; Aliaj 11'	Report	Giannakopoulos 39'	Stadium: Qemal Stafa Stadium; Attendance: 15,800; Referee: Eduardo Iturralde González (Spain)

8 September 2006 FIFA World Cup Q	Georgia	2–0	Albania	Tbilisi, Georgia
20:00 (UTC+4)	Iashvili 15'; Demetradze 90'	Report		Stadium: Lokomotivi Stadium; Attendance: 20,000; Referee: Mark Courtney (Northern Ireland)

9 October 2006 FIFA World Cup Q	Albania	0–2	Denmark	Tirana, Albania
20:45 (UTC+2)		Report	Jørgensen 52'; Tomasson 72'	Stadium: Qemal Stafa Stadium; Attendance: 14,500; Referee: Yuri Baskakov (Russia)

13 October 2006 FIFA World Cup Q	Kazakhstan	0–1	Albania	Almaty, Kazakhstan
20:00 (UTC+7)		Report	Bushi 61'	Stadium: Almaty Central Stadium; Attendance: 12,300; Referee: Fritz Stuchlik (Austria)

== 2005 ==
9 February 2006 FIFA World Cup Q	Albania	0–2	Ukraine	Tirana, Albania
19:45 (UTC+1)		Report	Rusol 40'; Husin 59'	Stadium: Qemal Stafa Stadium; Attendance: 12,000; Referee: Steve Bennett (England)

26 March 2006 FIFA World Cup Q	Turkey	2–0	Albania	Istanbul, Turkey
20:00 (UTC+2)	Ateş 3' (pen.); Beqiri 5' (o.g.)	Report		Stadium: İnönü Stadium; Attendance: 32,000; Referee: Konrad Plautz (Austria)

30 March 2006 FIFA World Cup Q	Greece	2–0	Albania	Piraeus, Greece
21:30 (UTC+3)	Charisteas 34'; Karagounis 85'			Stadium: Karaiskakis Stadium; Attendance: 31,700; Referee: Bertrand Layec (France)

29 May International Friendly	Poland	1–0	Albania	Szczecin, Poland
17:30 (UTC+2)	Żurawski 1'	Report		Stadium: Stadion Florian Krygier; Attendance: 14,000; Referee: Michael Weiner (Germany)

4 June 2006 FIFA World Cup Q	Albania	3–2	Georgia	Tirana, Albania
20:30 (UTC+2)	Tare 6', 55'; Skela 33'	Report	Burduli 85'; Kobiashvili 90'	Stadium: Qemal Stafa Stadium; Attendance: 0 Referee: Alexandru Tudor (Romania)

8 June 2006 FIFA World Cup Q	Denmark	3–1	Albania	Copenhagen, Denmark
20:00 (UTC+2)	Larsen 6', 47'; Jørgensen 55'	Report	Bogdani 72'	Stadium: Parken Stadium; Attendance: 26,366; Referee: Peter Fröjdfeldt (Sweden)

17 August International Friendly	Albania	2–1	Azerbaijan	Tirana, Albania
	Bushi 37'; Cana 72'	Report	Tagizade 3'	Stadium: Qemal Stafa Stadium; Attendance: 7,300; Referee: Mustafa Çulcu (Turkey)

3 September 2006 FIFA World Cup Q	Albania	2–1	Kazakhstan	Tirana, Albania
20:00 (UTC+2)	Myrtaj 54'; Bogdani 56'	Report	Nizovtsev 62'	Stadium: Qemal Stafa Stadium; Attendance: 2,000; Referee: Krzysztof Słupik (Poland)

8 October 2006 FIFA World Cup Q	Ukraine	2–2	Albania	Dnipro, Ukraine
19:15 (UTC+3)	Shevchenko 45+1'; Rotan 86'	Report	Bogdani 75', 83'	Stadium: Meteor Stadium; Attendance: 24,361; Referee: Johan Verbist (Belgium)

12 October 2006 FIFA World Cup Q	Albania	0–1	Turkey	Tirana, Albania
18:00 (UTC+2)		Report	Metin 57'	Stadium: Qemal Stafa Stadium; Attendance: 8,000; Referee: Arturo Daudén Ibáñez (Spain)

== 2006 ==
1 March International Friendly	Albania	1–2	Lithuania	Tirana, Albania
18:00 (UTC+1)	Aliaj 33' (pen.)	Report	Savėnas 34'; Danilevičius 41'	Stadium: Qemal Stafa Stadium; Attendance: 7,300; Referee: Tiziano Pieri (Italy)

22 March International Friendly	Albania	0–0	Georgia	Tirana, Albania
18:00 (UTC+1)		Report		Stadium: Qemal Stafa Stadium; Attendance: 7,300; Referee: Paolo Dondarini (Italy)

16 August International Friendly	San Marino	0–3	Albania	Serravalle, San Marino
20:30 (UTC+2)		Report	Tare 7'; Skela 28'; Lala 32'	Stadium: Stadio Olimpico; Attendance: 700; Referee: Anton Zammit (Malta)

2 September UEFA Euro 2008 Q	Belarus	2–2	Albania	Minsk, Belarus
20:00 (UTC+3)	Kalachev 1'; Romaschenko 24'	Report	Skela 7' (pen.); Hasi 86'	Stadium: Dinamo Stadium; Attendance: 23,000; Referee: Tony Asumaa (Finland)

6 September UEFA Euro 2008 Q	Albania	0–2	Romania	Tirana, Albania
20:00 (UTC+2)		Report	Dică 65'; Mutu 75' (pen.)	Stadium: Qemal Stafa Stadium; Attendance: 12,000; Referee: Olegário Benquerença (Portugal)

11 October UEFA Euro 2008 Q	Netherlands	2–1	Albania	Amsterdam, Netherlands
20:30 (UTC+2)	van Persie 14'; Dede 41' (o.g.)	Report	Curri 67'	Stadium: Amsterdam ArenA; Attendance: 37,000; Referee: Alon Yefet (Israel)

== 2007 ==
7 February International Friendly	Albania	0–1	Macedonia	Shkodër, Albania
16:00 (UTC+1)		Report	Ristić 33'	Stadium: Loro Boriçi Stadium; Attendance: 7,000; Referee: Paolo Bertini (Italy)

24 March UEFA Euro 2008 Q	Albania	0–0	Slovenia	Shkodër, Albania
17:00 (UTC+1)		Report		Stadium: Loro Boriçi Stadium; Attendance: 12,000; Referee: Joseph Attard (Malta)

28 March UEFA Euro 2008 Q	Bulgaria	0–0	Albania	Sofia, Bulgaria
18:00 (UTC+3)		Report		Stadium: Vasil Levski National Stadium; Attendance: 24,893; Referee: Jonas Eriksson (Sweden)

2 June UEFA Euro 2008 Q	Albania	2–0	Luxembourg	Tirana, Albania
20:30 (UTC+2)	Kapllani 38'; Haxhi 57'	Report		Stadium: Qemal Stafa Stadium; Attendance: 3,500; Referee: Lasha Silagava (Georgia)

6 June UEFA Euro 2008 Q	Luxembourg	0–3	Albania	Luxembourg City, Luxembourg
20:15 (UTC+2)		Report	Skela 25'; Kapllani 36', 72'	Stadium: Stade Josy Barthel; Attendance: 4,325; Referee: Paulius Malžinskas (Lithuania)

22 August International Friendly	Albania	3–0	Malta	Tirana, Albania
20:45 (UTC+2)	Salihi 33'; Berisha 46'; Duro 62'	Report		Stadium: Qemal Stafa Stadium; Attendance: 3,000; Referee: İsmet Arzuman (Turkey)

12 September UEFA Euro 2008 Q	Albania	0–1	Netherlands	Tirana, Albania
20:45 (UTC+2)		Report	van Nistelrooy 90'	Stadium: Qemal Stafa Stadium; Attendance: 19,600; Referee: Mike Riley (England)

13 October UEFA Euro 2008 Q	Slovenia	0–0	Albania	Celje, Slovenia
20:30 (UTC+2)		Report		Stadium: Petrol Arena Stadium; Attendance: 4,625; Referee: Duarte Gomes (Portugal)

17 October UEFA Euro 2008 Q	Albania	1–1	Bulgaria	Tirana, Albania
20:45 (UTC+2)	Duro 32'	Report	Berbatov 87'	Stadium: Qemal Stafa Stadium; Attendance: 3,000; Referee: Fritz Stuchlik (Austria)

17 November UEFA Euro 2008 Q	Albania	2–4	Belarus	Tirana, Albania
20:00 (UTC+1)	Bogdani 43'; Kapllani 44'	Report	Romaschenko 32', 63' (pen.); Kutuzov 45', 55'	Stadium: Qemal Stafa Stadium; Attendance: 2,064; Referee: Bülent Demirlek (Turkey)

21 November UEFA Euro 2008 Q	Romania	6–1	Albania	Bucharest, Romania
18:00 (UTC+2)	Dică 22', 73' (pen.); Tamaş 53'; Niculae 63', 68'; Marica 71' (pen.)	Report	Kapllani 64'	Stadium: Stadionul Național; Attendance: 23,427; Referee: Edo Trivković (Croatia)

== 2008 ==
27 May International Friendly	Albania	0–1	Poland	Reutlingen, Germany
20:30 (UTC+2)		Report	Żurawski 3'	Stadium: Stadion an der Kreuzeiche; Attendance: 2,900; Referee: Knut Kircher (Germany)

20 August International Friendly	Albania	2–0	Liechtenstein	Tirana, Albania
20:45 (UTC+2)	Hyka 1'; Kapllani 18'	Report		Stadium: Qemal Stafa Stadium; Attendance: 1,500; Referee: Mario Vlk (Slovakia)

6 September 2010 FIFA World Cup Q	Albania	0–0	Sweden	Tirana, Albania
18:45 (UTC+2)		Report		Stadium: Qemal Stafa Stadium; Attendance: 13,522; Referee: Alberto Undiano Mallenco (Spain)

10 September 2010 FIFA World Cup Q	Albania	3–0	Malta	Tirana, Albania
20:45 (UTC+2)	Bogdani 45+1'; Duro 83'; Dallku 90'	Report		Stadium: Qemal Stafa Stadium; Attendance: 7,400; Referee: Robert Schörgenhofer (Austria)

11 October 2010 FIFA World Cup Q	Hungary	2–0	Albania	Budapest, Hungary
19:45 (UTC+2)	Torghelle 49'; Juhász 81'			Stadium: Ferenc Puskás Stadium; Attendance: 24,580; Referee: Claudio Circhetta (Switzerland)

15 October 2010 FIFA World Cup Q	Portugal	0–0	Albania	Braga, Portugal
20:45 (UTC+1)		Report		Stadium: Estádio Municipal de Braga; Attendance: 29,500; Referee: Knut Kircher (Germany)

19 November International Friendly	Azerbaijan	1–1	Albania	Baku, Azerbaijan
20:00 (UTC+4)	Subašić 4'	Report	Skela 12'	Stadium: Tofiq Bahramov Republican Stadium; Attendance: 10,000; Referee: Lasha Silagava (Georgia)

== 2009 ==
11 February 2010 FIFA World Cup Q	Malta	0–0	Albania	Ta' Qali, Malta
19:30 (UTC+1)		Report		Stadium: National Stadium; Attendance: 2,041; Referee: Alexandru Deaconu (Romania)

28 March 2010 FIFA World Cup Q	Albania	0–1	Hungary	Tirana, Albania
20:30 (UTC+1)		Report	Torghelle 38'	Stadium: Qemal Stafa Stadium; Attendance: 15,200; Referee: Björn Kuipers (Netherlands)

1 April 2010 FIFA World Cup Q	Denmark	3–0	Albania	Copenhagen, Denmark
20:15 (UTC+2)	Andreasen 31'; Larsen 37'; Poulsen 80'	Report		Stadium: Parken Stadium; Attendance: 24,320; Referee: Damir Skomina (Slovenia)

6 June 2010 FIFA World Cup Q	Albania	1–2	Portugal	Tirana, Albania
20:45 (UTC+2)	Bogdani 28'	Report	Almeida 27'; Bruno Alves 90'	Stadium: Qemal Stafa Stadium; Attendance: 13,320; Referee: Florian Meyer (Germany)

10 June International Friendly	Albania	1–1	Georgia	Tirana, Albania
19:00 (UTC+2)	Agolli 58'	Report	Dvalishvili 2'	Stadium: Qemal Stafa Stadium; Attendance: 2,000; Referee: Aleksandar Stavrev (Macedonia)

12 August International Friendly	Albania	6–1	Cyprus	Tirana, Albania
19:00 (UTC+2)	Skela 26' (pen.), 44' (pen.); Bogdani 65'; Duro 68'; Agolli 71'; Vila 75'	Report	Charalambidis 37'	Stadium: Qemal Stafa Stadium; Attendance: 2,500; Referee: Bülent Yıldırım (Turkey)

9 September 2010 FIFA World Cup Q	Albania	1–1	Denmark	Tirana, Albania
20:30 (UTC+2)	Bogdani 51'	Report	Bendtner 40'	Stadium: Qemal Stafa Stadium; Attendance: 6,000; Referee: Cüneyt Çakır (Turkey)

14 October 2010 FIFA World Cup Q	Sweden	4–1	Albania	Solna, Sweden
20:45 (UTC+2)	Mellberg 6', 42'; Berg 40'; Svensson 86'	Report	Salihi 57'	Stadium: Råsunda Stadium; Attendance: 25,342; Referee: Valentin Ivanov (Russia)

14 November International Friendly	Estonia	0–0	Albania	Tallinn, Estonia
16:00 (UTC+2)		Report		Stadium: A. Le Coq Arena; Attendance: 2,110; Referee: Audrius Kancleris (Lithuania)

== 2010 ==
3 March International Friendly	Albania	1–0	Northern Ireland	Tirana, Albania
20:45 (UTC+1)	Skela 28'	Report		Stadium: Qemal Stafa Stadium; Attendance: 7,500; Referee: Elmir Pilav (Bosnia and Herzegovina)

25 May International Friendly	Montenegro	0–1	Albania	Podgorica, Montenegro
20:15 (UTC+2)		Report	Salihi 79'	Stadium: Podgorica City Stadium; Attendance: 6,000; Referee: Marijo Strahonja (Croatia)

2 June International Friendly	Albania	1–0	Andorra	Tirana, Albania
20:00 (UTC+2)	Salihi 44'	Report		Stadium: Qemal Stafa Stadium; Attendance: 3,000; Referee: Dimitar Meckarovski (Macedonia)

11 August International Friendly	Albania	1–0	Uzbekistan	Durrës, Albania
20:30 (UTC+2)	Salihi 14'	Report		Stadium: Niko Dovana Stadium; Attendance: 8,000; Referee: Pavle Radovanović (Montenegro)

3 September UEFA Euro 2012 Q	Romania	1–1	Albania	Piatra Neamţ, Romania
21:00 (UTC+3)	Stancu 80'	Report	Muzaka 87'	Stadium: Stadionul Ceahlăul; Attendance: 13,400; Referee: Robert Schörgenhofer (Austria)

7 September UEFA Euro 2012 Q	Albania	1–0	Luxembourg	Tirana, Albania
20:15 (UTC+2)	Salihi 37'	Report		Stadium: Qemal Stafa Stadium; Attendance: 11,800; Referee: Richard Trutz (Slovakia)

8 October UEFA Euro 2012 Q	Albania	1–1	Bosnia and Herzegovina	Tirana, Albania
20:30 (UTC+1)	Duro 45+2'	Report	Ibišević 21'	Stadium: Qemal Stafa Stadium; Attendance: 11,300; Referee: Kristinn Jakobsson (Iceland)

12 October UEFA Euro 2012 Q	Belarus	2–0	Albania	Minsk, Belarus
20:30 (UTC+3)	Rodionov 10'; Krivets 77'	Report		Stadium: Dinamo Stadium; Attendance: 7,000; Referee: Peter Rasmussen (Denmark)

17 November International Friendly	Albania	0–0	Macedonia	Korçë, Albania
18:00 (UTC+1)		Report		Stadium: Skënderbeu Stadium; Attendance: 10,000; Referee: Hüseyin Göçek (Turkey)

== 2011 ==
9 February International Friendly	Albania	1–2	Slovenia	Tirana, Albania
20:00 (UTC+1)	Bulku 62'	Report	Novakovič 24'; Dedič 90' (pen.)	Stadium: Qemal Stafa Stadium; Attendance: 5,000; Referee: Michael Koukoulakis (Greece)

26 March UEFA Euro 2012 Q	Albania	1–0	Belarus	Tirana, Albania
20:00 (UTC+1)	Salihi 62'	Report		Stadium: Qemal Stafa Stadium; Attendance: 11,500; Referee: Markus Strömbergsson (Sweden)

7 June UEFA Euro 2012 Q	Bosnia and Herzegovina	2–0	Albania	Zenica, Bosnia and Herzegovina
20:15 (UTC+2)	Medunjanin 67'; Maletić 90+1'	Report		Stadium: Bilino Polje Stadium; Attendance: 9,000; Referee: Kevin Blom (Netherlands)

20 June International Friendly	Argentina	4–0	Albania	Buenos Aires, Argentina
18:00 (UTC-3)	Lavezzi 5'; Messi 42'; Agüero 74'; Tevez 90'	Report		Stadium: River Plate Stadium; Attendance: 25,000; Referee: Jorge Larrionda (Uruguay)

10 August International Friendly	Albania	3–2	Montenegro	Shkodër, Albania
20:00 (UTC+2)	Bogdani 40'; Hyka 64'; Salihi 70'	Report	Savić 40', 47'	Stadium: Loro Boriçi Stadium; Attendance: 5,000; Referee: Anton Genov (Belarus)

2 September UEFA Euro 2012 Q	Albania	1–2	France	Tirana, Albania
21:00 (UTC+2)	Bogdani 46'	Report	Benzema 11'; M'Vila 18'	Stadium: Qemal Stafa Stadium; Attendance: 15,600; Referee: Aleksei Nikolaev (Russia)

6 September UEFA Euro 2012 Q	Luxembourg	2–1	Albania	Luxembourg City, Luxembourg
20:15 (UTC+2)	Bettmer 27'; Joachim 78'	Report	Bogdani 64'	Stadium: Stade Josy Barthel; Attendance: 2,132; Referee: Petteri Kari (Finland)

7 October UEFA Euro 2012 Q	France	3–0	Albania	Paris, France
21:00 (UTC+2)	Malouda 11'; Rémy 38'; Réveillère 68'	Report		Stadium: Stade de France; Attendance: 65,239; Referee: Michael Koukoulakis (Greece)

11 October UEFA Euro 2012 Q	Albania	1–1	Romania	Tirana, Albania
20:00 (UTC+2)	Salihi 24'	Report	Luchin 77'	Stadium: Qemal Stafa Stadium; Attendance: 3,000; Referee: Gediminas Mažeika (Lithuania)

11 November International Friendly	Albania	0–1	Azerbaijan	Tirana, Albania
18:00 (UTC+1)		Report	Aliyev 22'	Stadium: Qemal Stafa Stadium; Attendance: 1,200; Referee: Paolo Mazzoleni (Italy)

15 November International Friendly	Macedonia	0–0	Albania	Prilep, Macedonia
13:00 (UTC+1)		Report		Stadium: Stadion Goce Delčev; Attendance: 3,500; Referee: Slavko Vinčić (Slovenia)

== 2012 ==
29 February International Friendly	Georgia	2–1	Albania	Tbilisi, Georgia
18:00 (UTC+4)	Kobakhidze 47'; Amisulashvili 88'	Report	Çani 3'	Stadium: Mikheil Meskhi Stadium; Attendance: 18,000; Referee: Ghenadie Sidenco (Moldova)

22 May International Friendly	Qatar	1–2	Albania	Madrid, Spain
19:00 (UTC+2)	Ali 53'	Report	Bakaj 46'; Bogdani 50' (pen.)	Stadium: Campo de Fútbol de Vallecas; Attendance: 100; Referee: Carlos Velasco Carballo (Spain)

27 May International Friendly	Iran	0–1	Albania	Istanbul, Turkey
19:00 (UTC+3)		Report	Vila 60'	Stadium: BJK İnönü Stadium; Attendance: 3,000; Referee: Hüseyin Göçek (Turkey)

15 August International Friendly	Albania	0–0	Moldova	Tirana, Albania
20:30 (UTC+2)		Report		Stadium: Qemal Stafa Stadium; Attendance: 6,000; Referee: Yunus Yıldırım (Turkey)

7 September 2014 FIFA World Cup Q	Albania	3–1	Cyprus	Tirana, Albania
20:30 (UTC+2)	Sadiku 36'; Çani 84'; Bogdani 86'	Report	Laban 45+5'	Stadium: Qemal Stafa Stadium; Attendance: 9,400; Referee: Artyom Kuchin (Kazakhstan)

11 September 2014 FIFA World Cup Q	Switzerland	2–0	Albania	Lucerne, Switzerland
20:30 (UTC+2)	Shaqiri 23'; Inler 68' (pen.)	Report		Stadium: Swissporarena; Attendance: 16,500; Referee: Ovidiu Hațegan (Romania)

12 October 2014 FIFA World Cup Q	Albania	1–2	Iceland	Tirana, Albania
19:00 (UTC+2)	Çani 29'	Report	Bjarnason 19'; G.Sigurðsson 81'	Stadium: Qemal Stafa Stadium; Attendance: 8,200; Referee: Tony Asumaa (Finland)

16 October 2014 FIFA World Cup Q	Albania	1–0	Slovenia	Tirana, Albania
20:45 (UTC+2)	Roshi 37'	Report		Stadium: Qemal Stafa Stadium; Attendance: 9,000; Referee: Martin Hansson (Sweden)

14 November International Friendly	Albania	0–0	Cameroon	Genève, Switzerland
19:45 UTC+1		Report		Stadium: Stade de Genève; Attendance: 4,500; Referee: Stephan Studer (Switzerland)

== 2013 ==
6 February International Friendly	Albania	1–2	Georgia	Tirana, Albania
21:30 (UTC+1)	Bogdani 25'	Report	Lobjanidze 40'; Vatsadze 82'	Stadium: Qemal Stafa Stadium; Attendance: 3,000; Referee: Dimitar Meckarovski (Macedonia)

22 March 2014 FIFA World Cup Q	Norway	0–1	Albania	Oslo, Norway
19:00 (UTC+1)		Report	Salihi 67'	Stadium: Ullevaal Stadion; Attendance: 12,000; Referee: Kevin Blom (Netherlands)

26 March International Friendly	Albania	4–1	Lithuania	Tirana, Albania
21:00 (UTC+1)	Meha 33'; Çani 38'; Basha 43'; Palionis 59' (o.g.)	Report	Razulis 75'	Stadium: Qemal Stafa Stadium; Attendance: 500; Referee: Ivailo Stoyanov (Bulgaria)

7 June 2014 FIFA World Cup Q	Albania	1–1	Norway	Tirana, Albania
20:30 (UTC+2)	Rama 41'	Report	Høgli 87'	Stadium: Qemal Stafa Stadium; Attendance: 16,900; Referee: Willie Collum (Scotland)

14 August International Friendly	Albania	2–0	Armenia	Tirana, Albania
20:45 (UTC+2)	Rama 21'; Kace 67'	Report		Stadium: Qemal Stafa Stadium; Attendance: 3,000; Referee: Stanislav Todorov (Bulgaria)

6 September 2014 FIFA World Cup Q	Slovenia	1–0	Albania	Ljubljana, Slovenia
20:30 (UTC+2)	Kampl 19'	Report		Stadium: Stožice Stadium; Attendance: 13,843; Referee: István Vad (Hungary)

10 September 2014 FIFA World Cup Q	Iceland	2–1	Albania	Reykjavík, Iceland
19:00 (UTC)	Bjarnason 14'; Sigþórsson 47'	Report	Rama 9'	Stadium: Laugardalsvöllur; Attendance: 9,768; Referee: Andre Marriner (England)

11 October 2014 FIFA World Cup Q	Albania	1–2	Switzerland	Tirana, Albania
20:30 (UTC+2)	Salihi 89' (pen.)	Report	Shaqiri 48'; Lang 79'	Stadium: Qemal Stafa Stadium; Attendance: 14,000; Referee: Pedro Proença (Portugal)

15 October 2014 FIFA World Cup Q	Cyprus	0–0	Albania	Nicosia, Cyprus
19:00 (UTC+3)		Report		Stadium: GSP Stadium; Attendance: 341; Referee: Ivan Bebek (Croatia)

15 November International Friendly	Albania	0–0	Belarus	Antalya, Turkey
18:00 (UTC+2)		Report		Stadium: Akdeniz University Stadium; Attendance: 50; Referee: Fırat Aydınus (Turkey)

== 2014 ==
5 March International Friendly	Albania	2–0	Malta	Durrës, Albania
18:00 (UTC+1)	Basha 26'; Meha 53'	Report		Stadium: Niko Dovana Stadium; Attendance: 8,000; Referee: Dejan Jakimovski (Macedonia)

31 May International Friendly	Albania	0–1	Romania	Yverdon-les-Bains, Switzerland
19:00 (UTC+2)		Report	R. Raț 82'	Stadium: Stade Municipal; Attendance: 3,000; Referee: Nikolaj Hänni (Switzerland)

4 June International Friendly	Hungary	1–0	Albania	Budapest, Hungary
20:30 (UTC+2)	T. Priskin 82' (pen.)	Report		Stadium: Ferenc Puskás Stadium; Attendance: 4,492; Referee: Paul McLaughlin (Republic of Ireland)

8 June International Friendly	San Marino	0–3	Albania	Serravalle, San Marino
20:30 (UTC+2)		Report	Mavraj 27'; Vajushi 32'; Vila 73'	Stadium: Serravalle Stadium; Attendance: 1,920; Referee: Marco Borg (Malta)

7 September UEFA Euro 2016 Q	Portugal	0–1	Albania	Aveiro, Portugal
19:45 (UTC+1)		Report	Balaj 52'	Stadium: Estádio Municipal; Attendance: 23,205; Referee: Ruddy Buquet (France)

11 October UEFA Euro 2016 Q	Albania	1–1	Denmark	Elbasan, Albania
20:45 (UTC+2)	Lenjani 38'	Report	Vibe 81'	Stadium: Elbasan Arena; Attendance: 11,330; Referee: Viktor Kassai (Hungary)

14 October UEFA Euro 2016 Q	Serbia	0 – 3 (awarded)	Albania	Belgrade, Serbia
20:45 (UTC+2)		Report		Stadium: Partizan Stadium; Attendance: 25,200; Referee: Martin Atkinson (England)

14 November International Friendly	France	1–1	Albania	Rennes, France
20:45 (UTC+1)	Griezmann 73'	Report	Mavraj 40'	Stadium: Stade de la Route de Lorient; Attendance: 26,527; Referee: Miroslav Zelinka (Czech Rep.)

18 November International Friendly	Italy	1–0	Albania	Genoa, Italy
20:45 (UTC+1)	Salihi 82' (o.g.)	Report		Stadium: Luigi Ferraris; Attendance: 26,000; Referee: Alexander Harkam (Austria)

== 2015 ==
29 March UEFA Euro 2016 Q	Albania	2–1	Armenia	Elbasan, Albania
18:00 (UTC+2)	Mavraj 77'; Gashi 81'	Report	Mavraj 4' (o.g.)	Stadium: Elbasan Arena; Attendance: 12,300; Referee: David Fernández Borbalán (Spain)

13 June International Friendly	Albania	1–0	France	Elbasan, Albania
18:00 (UTC+2)	Kaçe 43'	Report		Stadium: Elbasan Arena; Attendance: 12,000; Referee: Halis Özkahya (Turkey)

4 September UEFA Euro 2016 Q	Denmark	0–0	Albania	Copenhagen, Denmark
20:45 (UTC+2)		Report		Stadium: Telia Parken; Attendance: 35,648; Referee: Willie Collum (Scotland)

7 September UEFA Euro 2016 Q	Albania	0–1	Portugal	Elbasan, Albania
20:45 (UTC+2)		Report	Veloso 90+2'	Stadium: Elbasan Arena; Attendance: 12,121; Referee: Jonas Eriksson (Sweden)

8 October UEFA Euro 2016 Q	Albania	0–2	Serbia	Elbasan, Albania
20:45 (UTC+2)		Report	Kolarov 90+1'; Ljajić 90+4'	Stadium: Elbasan Arena; Attendance: 12,330; Referee: Nicola Rizzoli (Italy)

11 October UEFA Euro 2016 Q	Armenia	0–3	Albania	Yerevan, Armenia
20:00 (UTC+4)		Report	Hovhannisyan 9' (o.g.); Djimsiti 23'; Sadiku 76'	Stadium: Vazgen Sargsyan Republican Stadium; Attendance: 4,700; Referee: Szymon Marciniak (Poland)

13 November International Friendly	Kosovo	2–2	Albania	Pristina, Kosovo
15:00 (UTC+1)	Celina 58' (pen.); Rashani 69'	Report	Manaj 54'; Rrahmani 73'	Stadium: Pristina City Stadium; Attendance: 16,000; Referee: Lorenc Jemini (Albania)

16 November International Friendly	Albania	2–2	Georgia	Tirana, Albania
20:00 (UTC+1)	Basha 89'; Cikalleshi 90+4'	Report	Amisulashvili 2'; Chanturia 53'	Stadium: Qemal Stafa Stadium; Attendance: 2,000; Referee: Davide Massa (Italy)

== 2016 ==
26 March International Friendly	Austria	2–1	Albania	Vienna, Austria
17:30 (UTC+1)	Janko 6'; Harnik 13'	Report	Lenjani 47'	Stadium: Ernst-Happel-Stadion; Attendance: 28,600; Referee: Ivan Kružliak (Slovakia)

29 March International Friendly	Luxembourg	0–2	Albania	Luxembourg City, Luxembourg
20:15 (UTC+2)		Report	Sadiku 63'; Cikalleshi 75'	Stadium: Stade Josy Barthel; Attendance: 3,132; Referee: Robert Schörgenhofer (Austria)

29 May International Friendly	Albania	3–1	Qatar	Hartberg, Austria
17:30 (UTC+2)	Ajeti 23'; Lenjani 40'; Sadiku 64'	Report	Hassan 2'	Stadium: Stadion Hartberg; Attendance: 4,500; Referee: Alexander Harkam (Austria)

3 June International Friendly	Albania	1–3	Ukraine	Bergamo, Italy
20:30 (UTC+2)	Sadiku 12'	Report	Stepanenko 8'; Yarmolenko 49'; Konoplyanka 87'	Stadium: Stadio Atleti Azzurri d'Italia; Attendance: 10,496; Referee: Paolo Mazzoleni (Italy)

11 June UEFA Euro 2016 Group A	Albania	0–1	Switzerland	Lens, France
15:00 (UTC+2)		Report	Schär 5'	Stadium: Stade Bollaert-Delelis; Attendance: 33,805; Referee: Carlos Velasco Carballo (Spain)

15 June UEFA Euro 2016 Group A	France	2–0	Albania	Marseille, France
21:00 (UTC+2)	Griezmann 90'; Payet 90+6'	Report		Stadium: Stade Vélodrome; Attendance: 63,670; Referee: Willie Collum (Scotland)

19 June UEFA Euro 2016 Group A	Romania	0–1	Albania	Lyon, France
21:00 (UTC+2)		Report	Sadiku 43'	Stadium: Parc Olympique Lyonnais; Attendance: 49,752; Referee: Pavel Královec (Czech Republic)

31 August International Friendly	Albania	0–0	Morocco	Shkodër, Albania
20:30 (UTC+2)		Report		Stadium: Loro Boriçi Stadium; Referee: Matej Jug (Slovenia)

5 September 2018 FIFA World Cup Q	Albania	2–1	Macedonia	Shkodër, Albania
20:45 (UTC+2)	Sadiku 9'; Balaj 89'	Report (FIFA); Report (UEFA)	Alioski 51'	Stadium: Loro Boriçi Stadium; Attendance: 14,667; Referee: Hüseyin Göçek (Turkey)

6 October 2018 FIFA World Cup Q	Liechtenstein	0–2	Albania	Vaduz, Liechtenstein
20:45 (UTC+2)		Report (FIFA); Report (UEFA)	Jehle 11' (o.g.); Balaj 71'	Stadium: Rheinpark Stadion; Attendance: 5,864; Referee: Tamás Bognar (Hungary)

9 October 2018 FIFA World Cup Q	Albania	0–2	Spain	Shkodër, Albania
20:45 (UTC+2)		Report (FIFA); Report (UEFA)	Costa 55'; Nolito 63'	Stadium: Loro Boriçi Stadium; Attendance: 15,245; Referee: Bas Nijhuis (Netherlands)

12 November 2018 FIFA World Cup Q	Albania	0–3	Israel	Elbasan, Albania
20:45 (UTC+1)		Report (FIFA); Report (UEFA)	Zahavi 18' (pen.); Einbinder 66'; Atar 84'	Stadium: Elbasan Arena; Attendance: 7,600; Referee: Deniz Aytekin (Germany)

== 2017 ==
24 March 2018 FIFA World Cup Q	Italy	2–0	Albania	Palermo, Italy
20:45 (UTC+1)	De Rossi 12' (pen.); Immobile 71'	Report (FIFA); Report (UEFA)		Stadium: Stadio Renzo Barbera; Attendance: 33,136; Referee: Slavko Vinčić (Slovenia)

28 March International Friendly	Albania	1–2	Bosnia and Herzegovina	Elbasan, Albania
18:00 (UTC+2)	Balaj 68'	Report	Džeko 7' (pen.); Lulić 42'	Stadium: Elbasan Arena; Attendance: 4,550; Referee: Dimitar Meckaroski (Macedonia)

4 June International Friendly	Luxembourg	2–1	Albania	Luxembourg City, Luxembourg
19:00 (UTC+2)	Turpel 63'; Malget 75'	Report	Roshi 53'	Stadium: Stade Josy Barthel; Attendance: 3,052; Referee: Tim Marshall (Northern Ireland)

11 June 2018 FIFA World Cup Q	Israel	0–3	Albania	Haifa, Israel
21:45 (UTC+3)		Report (FIFA); Report (UEFA)	Sadiku 22', 44'; Memushaj 71'	Stadium: Sammy Ofer Stadium; Attendance: 15,150; Referee: Aleksei Kulbakov (Belarus)

2 September 2018 FIFA World Cup Q	Albania	2–0	Liechtenstein	Elbasan, Albania
18:00 (UTC+2)	Roshi 54'; Agolli 78'	Report (FIFA); Report (UEFA)		Stadium: Elbasan Arena; Attendance: 5,500; Referee: Sergey Lapochkin (Russia)

5 September 2018 FIFA World Cup Q	Macedonia	1–1	Albania	Strumica, Macedonia
20:45 (UTC+2)	Trajkovski 78' (pen.)	Report (FIFA); Report (UEFA)	Roshi 53'	Stadium: Stadion Mladost; Attendance: 3,493; Referee: Jonas Eriksson (Sweden)

6 October 2018 FIFA World Cup Q	Spain	3–0	Albania	Alicante, Spain
20:45 (UTC+2)	Rodrigo 16'; Isco 24'; Thiago 27'	Report (FIFA); Report (UEFA)		Stadium: Estadio José Rico Pérez; Attendance: 25,397; Referee: Aleksei Eskov (Russia)

9 October 2018 FIFA World Cup Q	Albania	0–1	Italy	Shkodër, Albania
20:45 (UTC+2)		Report (FIFA); Report (UEFA)	Candreva 73'	Stadium: Loro Boriçi Stadium; Attendance: 14,718; Referee: Svein Oddvar Moen (Norway)

13 November International Friendly	Turkey	2–3	Albania	Antalya, Turkey
19:30 (UTC+2)	Ünder 47'; Akbaba 60'	Report	Sadiku 24', 39'; Grezda 55'	Stadium: New Antalya Stadium; Attendance: 8,000; Referee: Georgi Kabakov (Bulgaria)

== 2018 ==
26 March International Friendly	Albania	0–1	Norway	Elbasan, Albania
19:00 (UTC+1)		Report	Rosted 71'	Stadium: Elbasan Arena; Referee: Fyodor Zammit (Malta)

29 May International Friendly	Kosovo	3–0	Albania	Zürich, Switzerland
20:00 (UTC+1)	Zeneli 20', 51'; Zhegrova 67'	Report		Stadium: Letzigrund; Attendance: 18,700; Referee: Alain Bieri (Switzerland)

3 June International Friendly	Albania	1–4	Ukraine	Évian-les-Bains, France
16:00 (UTC+1)	Ndoj 89'	Report	Konoplyanka 31', 90'; Yarmolenko 35', 45+1'	Stadium: Camille Fournier Stadium; Referee: François Letexier (France)

7 September 2018–19 UEFA Nations League	Albania	1–0	Israel	Elbasan, Albania
20:45 (UTC+1)	Xhaka 55'	Report		Stadium: Elbasan Arena; Attendance: 4,126; Referee: Viktor Kassai (Hungary)

10 September 2018–19 UEFA Nations League	Scotland	2–0	Albania	Glasgow, Scotland
20:45 (UTC+1)	Gjimshiti 47' (o.g.); Naismith 68'	Report		Stadium: Hampden Park; Attendance: 17,455; Referee: Matej Jug (Slovenia)

10 October International Friendly	Albania	0–0	Jordan	Elbasan, Albania
20:45 (UTC+1)		Report		Stadium: Elbasan Arena; Referee: Genc Nuza (Kosovo)

14 October 2018–19 UEFA Nations League	Israel	2–0	Albania	Be'er Sheva, Israel
20:45 (UTC+1)	Hemed 8'; Saba 83'	Report		Stadium: Turner Stadium; Attendance: 14,950; Referee: Paolo Mazzoleni (Italy)

17 November 2018–19 UEFA Nations League	Albania	0–4	Scotland	Shkodër, Albania
20:45 (UTC+1)		Report	Fraser 14'; Fletcher 45+2' (pen.); Forrest 55', 67'	Stadium: Loro Boriçi Stadium; Referee: Vladislav Bezborodov (Russia)

20 November International Friendly	Albania	1–0	Wales	Elbasan, Albania
20:00 (UTC+1)	Balaj 58' (pen.)	Report		Stadium: Elbasan Arena; Referee: Dejan Jakimovski (Macedonia)

== 2019 ==
22 March UEFA Euro 2020 Q	Albania	0–2	Turkey	Shkodër, Albania
20:45 (UTC+1)		Report	Yılmaz 21'; Çalhanoğlu 55'	Stadium: Loro Boriçi Stadium; Attendance: 15,000; Referee: Tobias Stieler (Germany)

25 March UEFA Euro 2020 Q	Andorra	0–3	Albania	Andorra la Vella, Andorra
20:45 (UTC+1)		Report	Sadiku 21'; Balaj 87'; Abrashi 90+6'	Stadium: Estadi Nacional; Referee: Filip Glova (Slovakia)

8 June UEFA Euro 2020 Q	Iceland	1–0	Albania	Reykjavík, Iceland
15:00 (UTC+1)	Guðmundsson 22'	Report		Stadium: Laugardalsvöllur; Attendance: 8,968; Referee: Bobby Madden (Scotland)

11 June UEFA Euro 2020 Q	Albania	2–0	Moldova	Elbasan, Albania
20:45 (UTC+1)	Cikalleshi 66'; Ramadani 90+3'	Report		Stadium: Elbasan Arena; Attendance: 5,004; Referee: Ville Nevalainen (Finland)

7 September UEFA Euro 2020 Q	France	4–1	Albania	Saint-Denis, France
20:45 (UTC+1)	Coman 8', 68'; Giroud 27'; Ikoné 85'	Report	Cikalleshi 90' (pen.)	Stadium: Stade de France; Attendance: 77,655; Referee: Jesús Gil Manzano (Spain)

10 September UEFA Euro 2020 Q	Albania	4–2	Iceland	Elbasan, Albania
20:45 (UTC+1)	Dermaku 32'; Hysaj 52'; Roshi 79'; Cikalleshi 83'	Report	G. Sigurðsson 47'; Sigþórsson 58'	Stadium: Elbasan Arena; Attendance: 8,652; Referee: Ivan Kružliak (Slovakia)

11 October UEFA Euro 2020 Q	Turkey	1–0	Albania	Istanbul, Turkey
20:45 (UTC+1)	Tosun 90'	Report		Stadium: Şükrü Saracoğlu Stadium; Attendance: 41,438; Referee: Ovidiu Hațegan (Romania)

14 October UEFA Euro 2020 Q	Moldova	0–4	Albania	Chișinău, Moldova
20:45 (UTC+1)		Report	Cikalleshi 22'; Bare 34'; Trashi 40'; Manaj 90'	Stadium: Zimbru Stadium; Attendance: 4,367; Referee: Chris Kavanagh (England)

14 November UEFA Euro 2020 Q	Albania	2–2	Andorra	Elbasan, Albania
20:45 (UTC+1)	Balaj 6'; Manaj 55'	Report	C. Martínez 18', 48'	Stadium: Elbasan Arena; Attendance: 4,260; Referee: Kristo Tohver (Estonia)

17 November UEFA Euro 2020 Q	Albania	0–2	France	Tirana, Albania
20:45 (UTC+1)		Report	Tolisso 9'; Griezmann 30'	Stadium: Arena Kombëtare; Attendance: 19,228; Referee: Slavko Vinčić (Slovenia)
