= Play and Rebuild Together Tournament =

Turneu "Luajmë dhe Rindërtojmë së Bashku"

Tournament details
- Country: Albania
- Venue: Arena Kombëtare
- Date: 10 January 2020
- Teams: 4

Final positions
- Champions: Italy (veterans)
- Runners-up: Greece (veterans)
- Semifinalists: Albania (veterans); Turkey (veterans)

Tournament statistics
- Matches played: 3
- Goals scored: 4 (1.33 per match)
- Attendance: 6,100 (2,033 per match)

The Play and Rebuild Together Tournament (Albanian: Turneu "Luajmë dhe Rindërtojmë së Bashku") was a charity international football tournament contested by the men's national veterans' teams. It took place in Albania on 10 January 2020 and the profits gathered from these meetings went to those affected by 2019 Albania earthquake.

== Squads ==
The four men's national veterans' teams involved in the tournament were required to register a squad of over 11 players, including one or two goalkeepers.

=== Albania (veterans) ===
Albania (veterans)
- Coach: (Albania) Ilir Shulku

Note: Flags indicate national team as defined under FIFA eligibility rules; some limited exceptions apply. Players may hold more than one non-FIFA nationality.

No.	Pos.	Nation	Player
1	GK	ALB	Foto Strakosha
4	DF	ALB	Armend Dallku
6	MF	KOS	Besnik Hasi
7	MF	ALB	Edvin Murati
8	FW	ALB	Alban Bushi
9	DF	ALB	Ervin Bulku
10	FW	ALB	Altin Rraklli
11	DF	ALB	Adrian Aliaj
12	GK	ALB	Arjan Beqaj
13	MF	ALB	Ervin Skela

No.	Pos.	Nation	Player
14	MF	ALB	Altin Lala
15	MF	ALB	Redi Jupi
16	MF	MKD	Artim Shaqiri
17	FW	ALB	Igli Tare
18	MF	ALB	Klodian Duro
21	MF	MKD	Nderim Nexhipi
22	FW	ALB	Erjon Bogdani
24	DF	ALB	Debatik Curri
28	DF	ALB	Nevil Dede

=== Greece (veterans) ===
Greece (veterans)
- Coach: (Greece) Charalampos Zelenitsas

Note: Flags indicate national team as defined under FIFA eligibility rules; some limited exceptions apply. Players may hold more than one non-FIFA nationality.

No.	Pos.	Nation	Player
—	GK	GRE	Fanis Katergiannakis
—	GK	GRE	Georgios Bantis
—	DF	GRE	Ilias Kotsios
—	DF	GRE	Leonidas Vokolos
—	DF	GRE	Nikos Goulis
—	DF	GRE	Stratos Apostolakis

No.	Pos.	Nation	Player
—	MF	GRE	Giannis Skopelitis
—	MF	GRE	Giorgos Karagounis
—	MF	GER	Kostas Ipirotis
—	MF	GRE	Kostas Kiassos
—	FW	GRE	Dimitrios Papadopoulos
—	FW	GRE	Theofanis Gekas

=== Italy (veterans) ===
Italy (veterans)
- Coach: (Italy) (Albania) Gianni De Biasi

Note: Flags indicate national team as defined under FIFA eligibility rules; some limited exceptions apply. Players may hold more than one non-FIFA nationality.

No.	Pos.	Nation	Player
1	GK	ITA	Antonio Chimenti
2	DF	ITA	Cristian Zaccardo
3	DF	ITA	Max Tonetto
4	MF	ITA	Luigi Di Biagio
5	DF	ITA	Francesco Colonnese
6	MF	ITA	Dario Marcolin
7	FW	ITA	Mauro Esposito
8	MF	ITA	Giampiero Maini

No.	Pos.	Nation	Player
9	FW	ITA	Massimo Agostini
10	FW	ITA	Benito Carbone
11	MF	ITA	Massimo Bonanni
14	DF	ITA	Gabriele Grossi
17	MF	ITA	Damiano Tommasi
19	DF	ITA	Massimo Paganin
20	MF	ITA	Simone Perrotta

=== Turkey (veterans) ===
Turkey (veterans)
- Coach: (Turkey) Rüştü Reçber

Note: Flags indicate national team as defined under FIFA eligibility rules; some limited exceptions apply. Players may hold more than one non-FIFA nationality.

No.	Pos.	Nation	Player
—	GK	TUR	Serdar Kulbilge
—	DF	TUR	Bülent Korkmaz
—	DF	TUR	Emre Aşık
—	DF	TUR	Faruk Atalay
—	DF	TUR	Omer Bulut
—	MF	TUR	Cihan Haspolatlı

No.	Pos.	Nation	Player
—	MF	TUR	Mehmet Aurélio
—	MF	TUR	Tuncay Şanlı
—	MF	TUR	Volkan Arslan
—	FW	TUR	Hasan Kabze
—	FW	TUR	Mehmet Yılmaz
—	FW	TUR	Ümit Karan

== Results ==
10 January 2020 First semi-final	Albania (veterans)	1–1 (2–3 p)	Italy (veterans)	Tirana, Albania
18:10	Bogdani 34'	Report	Esposito 10'	Stadium: Arena Kombëtare; Referee: Mario Shabanaj (Albania)
	Penalties
	Skela (penalty scored); Duro (penalty missed); Aliaj (penalty scored)		(penalty scored) Carbone; (penalty scored) Bonanni; (penalty scored) Marcolin

10 January 2020 Second semi-final	Greece (veterans)	1–0	Turkey (veterans)	Tirana, Albania
19:00	Karagounis 32' (pen.)	Report		Stadium: Arena Kombëtare

10 January 2020 Final	Italy (veterans)	1–0	Greece (veterans)	Tirana, Albania
19:35	Kotsios 23' (o.g.)	Report		Stadium: Arena Kombëtare; Referee: Emanuela Rusta (Albania)

== Goalscorers ==
Rank	Player	Goals scored
1	(Albania) Erjon Bogdani	1
1	(Greece) Giorgos Karagounis	1
1	(Greece) Ilias Kotsios (own goal)	1
1	(Italy) Mauro Esposito	1
By penalty shoot-out
1	(Albania) Adrian Aliaj	1
1	(Italy) Benito Carbone	1
1	(Italy) Dario Marcolin	1
1	(Albania) Ervin Skela	1
1	(Italy) Massimo Bonanni	1
