= 2006 FIFA World Cup qualification – UEFA Group 2 =

The 2006 FIFA World Cup qualification UEFA Group 2 was a UEFA qualifying group for the 2006 FIFA World Cup. The group comprised Albania, Denmark, Georgia, Greece, Kazakhstan, Turkey and Ukraine.

The group was won by Ukraine, who qualified for the 2006 FIFA World Cup. The runners-up Turkey entered the UEFA qualification play-offs. This qualification group was also notable for the fact that UEFA Euro 2004 champions Greece failed to qualify to finals after they finshed 4th. Their non-qualification was confirmed after a 1-0 defeat away to Denmark on 8 October 2005 - 461 days after winning the UEFA Euro 2004 final in Lisbon. 2002 FIFA World Cup Semi-Finalists Turkey qualified for two-legged play-off by finishing as Group 2 runners-up although they would ultimately lose their two legged play off two Switzerland on away goals meaning they would join Greece in failing to qualify for the 2006 finals.

It was the first time Kazakhstan took part in qualification from UEFA region, not AFC.

== Standings ==
Pos	Team	Pld	W	D	L	GF	GA	GD	Pts	Qualification	Ukraine national football team	Turkey national football team	Denmark national football team	Greece national football team	Albania national football team	Georgia national football team	Kazakhstan national football team
1	Ukraine	12	7	4	1	18	7	+11	25	Qualification to 2006 FIFA World Cup	—	0–1	1–0	1–1	2–2	2–0	2–0
2	Turkey	12	6	5	1	23	9	+14	23	Advance to second round	0–3	—	2–2	0–0	2–0	1–1	4–0
3	Denmark	12	6	4	2	24	12	+12	22		1–1	1–1	—	1–0	3–1	6–1	3–0
4	Greece	12	6	3	3	15	9	+6	21		0–1	0–0	2–1	—	2–0	1–0	3–1
5	Albania	12	4	1	7	11	20	−9	13		0–2	0–1	0–2	2–1	—	3–2	2–1
6	Georgia	12	2	4	6	14	25	−11	10		1–1	2–5	2–2	1–3	2–0	—	0–0
7	Kazakhstan	12	0	1	11	6	29	−23	1		1–2	0–6	1–2	1–2	0–1	1–2	—

Rules for classification: Tiebreakers

== Matches ==
4 September 2004
20:00

Denmark	1–1	Ukraine
Jørgensen 9'	(Report)	Husin 56'

Parken Stadium, Copenhagen
Attendance: 36,335
Referee: Urs Meier (Switzerland)
4 September 2004
20:00

Turkey	1–1	Georgia
Tekke 49'	(Report)	Asatiani 85'

Trabzon Hüseyin Avni Aker Stadium, Trabzon
Attendance: 10,169
Referee: Luis Medina Cantalejo (Spain)
4 September 2004
20:45

Albania	2–1	Greece
Murati 2'; Aliaj 11'	(Report)	Giannakopoulos 38'

Qemal Stafa, Tirana
Attendance: 25,800
Referee: Eduardo Iturralde González (Spain)

8 September 2004
20:00

Georgia	2–0	Albania
Iashvili 15'; Demetradze 90+1'	(Report)

Mikheil Meskhi Stadium, Tbilisi
Attendance: 20,000
Referee: Mark Courtney (Northern Ireland)
8 September 2004
21:00

Kazakhstan	1–2	Ukraine
Karpovich 34'	(Report)	Byelik 14'; Rotan 90'

Almaty Central Stadium, Almaty
Attendance: 23,000
Referee: Pedro Proença (Portugal)
8 September 2004
21:45

Greece	0–0	Turkey
	(Report)

Karaiskakis Stadium, Piraeus
Attendance: 32,182
Referee: Anders Frisk (Sweden)

9 October 2004
19:15

Ukraine	1–1	Greece
Shevchenko 48'	(Report)	Tsiartas 82'

Olimpiyskyi National Sports Complex, Kyiv
Attendance: 56,000
Referee: Manuel Mejuto González (Spain)
9 October 2004
20:00

Turkey	4–0	Kazakhstan
Gökdeniz 17'; Nihat 50'; Tekke 90', 90+3'	(Report)

Şükrü Saracoğlu Stadium, Istanbul
Attendance: 39,900
Referee: Vladimír Hriňák (Slovakia)
9 October 2004
20:45

Albania	0–2	Denmark
	(Report)	Jørgensen 52'; Tomasson 72'

Qemal Stafa, Tirana
Attendance: 18,500
Referee: Yuri Baskakov (Russia)

13 October 2004
19:15

Ukraine	2–0	Georgia
Byelik 12'; Shevchenko 79'	(Report)

Ukraina Stadium, Lviv
Attendance: 28,000
Referee: Wolfgang Stark (Germany)
13 October 2004
20:00

Kazakhstan	0–1	Albania
	(Report)	Bushi 61'

Almaty Central Stadium, Almaty
Attendance: 12,300
Referee: Fritz Stuchlik (Austria)
13 October 2004
20:00

Denmark	1–1	Turkey
Tomasson 27' (pen.)	(Report)	Nihat 70'

Parken Stadium, Copenhagen
Attendance: 41,331
Referee: Massimo De Santis (Italy)

17 November 2004
20:30

Turkey	0–3	Ukraine
	(Report)	Husyev 8'; Shevchenko 17', 88'

Şükrü Saracoğlu Stadium, Istanbul
Attendance: 40,486
Referee: Lucílio Batista (Portugal)
17 November 2004
21:00

Georgia	2–2	Denmark
Demetradze 33'; Asatiani 76'	(Report)	Tomasson 7', 64'

Mikheil Meskhi Stadium, Tbilisi
Attendance: 20,000
Referee: Darko Čeferin (Slovenia)
17 November 2004
21:30

Greece	3–1	Kazakhstan
Charisteas 24', 46'; Katsouranis 85'	(Report)	Baltiev 88'

Karaiskakis Stadium, Piraeus
Attendance: 31,838
Referee: Kostadin Kostadinov (Bulgaria)

9 February 2005
19:45

Albania	0–2	Ukraine
	(Report)	Rusol 40'; Husin 59'

Qemal Stafa, Tirana
Attendance: 12,000
Referee: Stephen Bennett (England)
9 February 2005
21:30

Greece	2–1	Denmark
Zagorakis 25'; Basinas 32' (pen.)	(Report)	Rommedahl 46'

Karaiskakis Stadium, Piraeus
Attendance: 32,430
Referee: Pierluigi Collina (Italy)

26 March 2005
20:00

Turkey	2–0	Albania
Necati 3' (pen.); Yıldıray Baştürk 5'	(Report)

BJK İnönü Stadium, Istanbul
Attendance: 32,000
Referee: Konrad Plautz (Austria)
26 March 2005
20:00

Denmark	3–0	Kazakhstan
Møller 10', 48'; C. Poulsen 33'	(Report)

Parken Stadium, Copenhagen
Attendance: 20,980
Referee: Grzegorz Gilewski (Poland)
26 March 2005
20:30

Georgia	1–3	Greece
Asatiani 22'	(Report)	Kapsis 43'; Vryzas 44'; Giannakopoulos 53'

Mikheil Meskhi Stadium, Tbilisi
Attendance: 23,000
Referee: Roberto Rosetti (Italy)

30 March 2005
19:15

Ukraine	1–0	Denmark
Voronin 68'	(Report)

Olimpiyskyi National Sports Complex, Kyiv
Attendance: 60,000
Referee: Ľuboš Micheľ (Slovakia)
30 March 2005
20:30

Georgia	2–5	Turkey
Amisulashvili 13'; Iashvili 40'	(Report)	Tolga 12'; Tekke 20', 35'; Koray 72'; Tuncay 89'

Mikheil Meskhi Stadium, Tbilisi
Attendance: 10,000
Referee: Terje Hauge (Norway)
30 March 2005
21:30

Greece	2–0	Albania
Charisteas 33'; Karagounis 84'	(Report)

Karaiskakis Stadium, Piraeus
Attendance: 31,700
Referee: Bertrand Layec (France)

4 June 2005
19:15

Ukraine	2–0	Kazakhstan
Shevchenko 18'; Avdeev 83' (o.g.)	(Report)

Olimpiyskyi National Sports Complex, Kyiv
Attendance: 45,000
Referee: Gerald Lehner (Austria)
4 June 2005
20:30

Albania	3–2	Georgia
Tare 6', 56'; Skela 33'	(Report)	Burduli 85'; Kobiashvili 90+4'

Qemal Stafa, Tirana
Attendance: 0
Referee: Alexandru Tudor (Romania)
4 June 2005
21:00

Turkey	0–0	Greece
	(Report)

BJK İnönü Stadium, Istanbul
Attendance: 26,700
Referee: Markus Merk (Germany)

8 June 2005
20:00

Denmark	3–1	Albania
Larsen 5', 47'; Jørgensen 55'	(Report)	Bogdani 73'

Parken Stadium, Copenhagen
Attendance: 26,366
Referee: Peter Fröjdfeldt (Sweden)
8 June 2005
21:00

Kazakhstan	0–6	Turkey
	(Report)	Tekke 13', 85'; Toraman 15'; Tuncay 41', 90'; Halil Altıntop 88'

Almaty Central Stadium, Almaty
Attendance: 20,000
Referee: Viktor Kassai (Hungary)
8 June 2005
21:30

Greece	0–1	Ukraine
	(Report)	Husin 82'

Karaiskakis Stadium, Piraeus
Attendance: 33,500
Referee: René Temmink (Netherlands)

17 August 2005
18:00

Kazakhstan	1–2	Georgia
Kenzhekhanov 23'	(Report)	Demetradze 50', 82'

Almaty Central Stadium, Almaty
Attendance: 9,000
Referee: Richard Havrilla (Slovakia)

3 September 2005
20:00

Albania	2–1	Kazakhstan
Myrtaj 53'; Bogdani 56'	(Report)	Nizovtsev 62'

Qemal Stafa, Tirana
Attendance: 20,000
Referee: Krzysztof Słupik (Poland)
3 September 2005
20:15

Georgia	1–1	Ukraine
Gakhokidze 89'	(Report)	Rotan 43'

Mikheil Meskhi Stadium, Tbilisi
Attendance: 0
Referee: Tom Henning Øvrebø (Norway)
3 September 2005
21:00

Turkey	2–2	Denmark
Okan 47'; Tümer 80'	(Report)	C. Jensen 40'; Larsen 90+3'

BJK İnönü Stadium, Istanbul
Attendance: 29,721
Referee: Manuel Mejuto González (Spain)

7 September 2005
19:00

Kazakhstan	1–2	Greece
Zhalmagambetov 53'	(Report)	Giannakopoulos 78'; Liberopoulos 90+4'

Almaty Central Stadium, Almaty
Attendance: 18,000
Referee: Alexandru Tudor (Romania)
7 September 2005
19:15

Ukraine	0–1	Turkey
	(Report)	Tümer 55'

Olimpiyskyi National Sports Complex, Kyiv
Attendance: 67,000
Referee: Alain Sars (France)
7 September 2005
20:00

Denmark	6–1	Georgia
Jensen 10'; Poulsen 30'; Agger 43'; Tomasson 55'; Larsen 80', 84'	(Report)	Demetradze 37'

Parken Stadium, Copenhagen
Attendance: 27,177
Referee: Emil Bozinovski (Macedonia)

8 October 2005
19:15

Ukraine	2–2	Albania
Shevchenko 45'; Rotan 86'	(Report)	Bogdani 75', 83'

Stadium Meteor, Dnipropetrovsk
Attendance: 24,000
Referee: Johan Verbist (Belgium)
8 October 2005
20:00

Denmark	1–0	Greece
Gravgaard 40'	(Report)

Parken Stadium, Copenhagen
Attendance: 42,099
Referee: Frank De Bleeckere (Belgium)
8 October 2005
20:00

Georgia	0–0	Kazakhstan
	(Report)

Boris Paichadze Stadium, Tbilisi
Attendance: 0
Referee: Jouni Hyytiä (Finland)

12 October 2005
18:00

Albania	0–1	Turkey
	(Report)	Tümer 58'

Qemal Stafa, Tirana
Attendance: 18,000
Referee: Arturo Daudén Ibáñez (Spain)
12 October 2005
19:00

Greece	1–0	Georgia
Papadopoulos 17'	(Report)

Karaiskakis Stadium, Piraeus
Attendance: 28,186
Referee: Matteo Trefoloni (Italy)
12 October 2005
22:00

Kazakhstan	1–2	Denmark
Kuchma 86'	(Report)	Gravgaard 46'; Tomasson 49'

Almaty Central Stadium, Almaty
Attendance: 8,050
Referee: Edo Trivković (Croatia)

== Goalscorers ==
There were 111 goals scored in 42 matches, for an average of 2.64 goals per match.

7 goals

- (Turkey) Fatih Tekke

6 goals

- (Denmark) Jon Dahl Tomasson
- (Ukraine) Andriy Shevchenko

5 goals

- (Denmark) Søren Larsen
- (Georgia (country)) Giorgi Demetradze

4 goals

- (Albania) Erjon Bogdani

3 goals

- (Denmark) Martin Jørgensen
- (Georgia (country)) Malkhaz Asatiani
- (Greece) Angelos Charisteas
- (Greece) Stelios Giannakopoulos
- (Turkey) Tümer Metin
- (Turkey) Tuncay
- (Ukraine) Andriy Husin
- (Ukraine) Ruslan Rotan

2 goals

- (Albania) Igli Tare
- (Denmark) Michael Gravgaard
- (Denmark) Claus Jensen
- (Denmark) Peter Møller
- (Denmark) Christian Poulsen
- (Georgia (country)) Alexander Iashvili
- (Turkey) Nihat Kahveci
- (Ukraine) Oleksiy Byelik

1 goal

- (Albania) Adrian Aliaj
- (Albania) Alban Bushi
- (Albania) Edwin Murati
- (Albania) Florian Myrtaj
- (Albania) Ervin Skela
- (Denmark) Daniel Agger
- (Denmark) Dennis Rommedahl
- (Georgia (country)) Aleksandr Amisulashvili
- (Georgia (country)) Vladimir Burduli
- (Georgia (country)) Giorgi Gakhokidze
- (Georgia (country)) Levan Kobiashvili
- (Greece) Angelos Basinas
- (Greece) Michalis Kapsis
- (Greece) Giorgos Karagounis
- (Greece) Kostas Katsouranis
- (Greece) Nikos Liberopoulos
- (Greece) Dimitrios Papadopoulos
- (Greece) Vasilios Tsiartas
- (Greece) Zisis Vryzas
- (Greece) Theodoros Zagorakis
- (Kazakhstan) Ruslan Baltiev
- (Kazakhstan) Andrei Karpovich
- (Kazakhstan) Daniar Kenzhekhanov
- (Kazakhstan) Aleksandr Kuchma
- (Kazakhstan) Maksim Nizovtsev
- (Kazakhstan) Maksim Zhalmagambetov
- (Turkey) Halil Altıntop
- (Turkey) Necati Ateş
- (Turkey) Koray Avcı
- (Turkey) Yıldıray Baştürk
- (Turkey) Okan Buruk
- (Turkey) Gökdeniz Karadeniz
- (Turkey) Tolga Seyhan
- (Turkey) İbrahim Toraman
- (Ukraine) Oleh Husyev
- (Ukraine) Andriy Rusol
- (Ukraine) Andriy Voronin

1 own goal

- (Kazakhstan) Igor Avdeev (against Ukraine)
