= Daniyar =

Daniar or Daniyar is a masculine given name and a surname. It may refer to:

== Given name ==
=== Daniar ===
- Daniar Dshunussow (born 1986), Kazakh-German ice hockey goaltender
- Daniar Kenzhekhanov (born 1983), Kazakhstani footballer
- Daniar Kobonov (born 1982), Kyrgyz Greco-Roman wrestler
- Daniar Usenov (born 1960), Kyrgyz banker and politician

=== Daniyar ===
- Daniyar Ismayilov (born 1992), Turkmenistani-Turkish weightlifter
- Daniyar Kairov (born 1994), Kazakhstani ice hockey player
- Daniyar Mukanov (born 1978), Kazakhstani footballer
- Daniyar Munaytbasov (born 1976), Kazakhstani boxer
- Daniyar Yeleussinov (born 1991), Kazakhstani amateur boxer
- Daniyar Yuldashev (born 1996), Kazakhstani karateka

== Surname ==
- Steve Daniar (born 1955), Canadian former wrestler
- Samat Daniyar (born 1999), Kazakhstani ice hockey player
- Sayan Daniyar (born 1999), Kazakhstani ice hockey player
