= UEFA Euro 2004 qualifying Group 10 =

Football tournament qualification stage

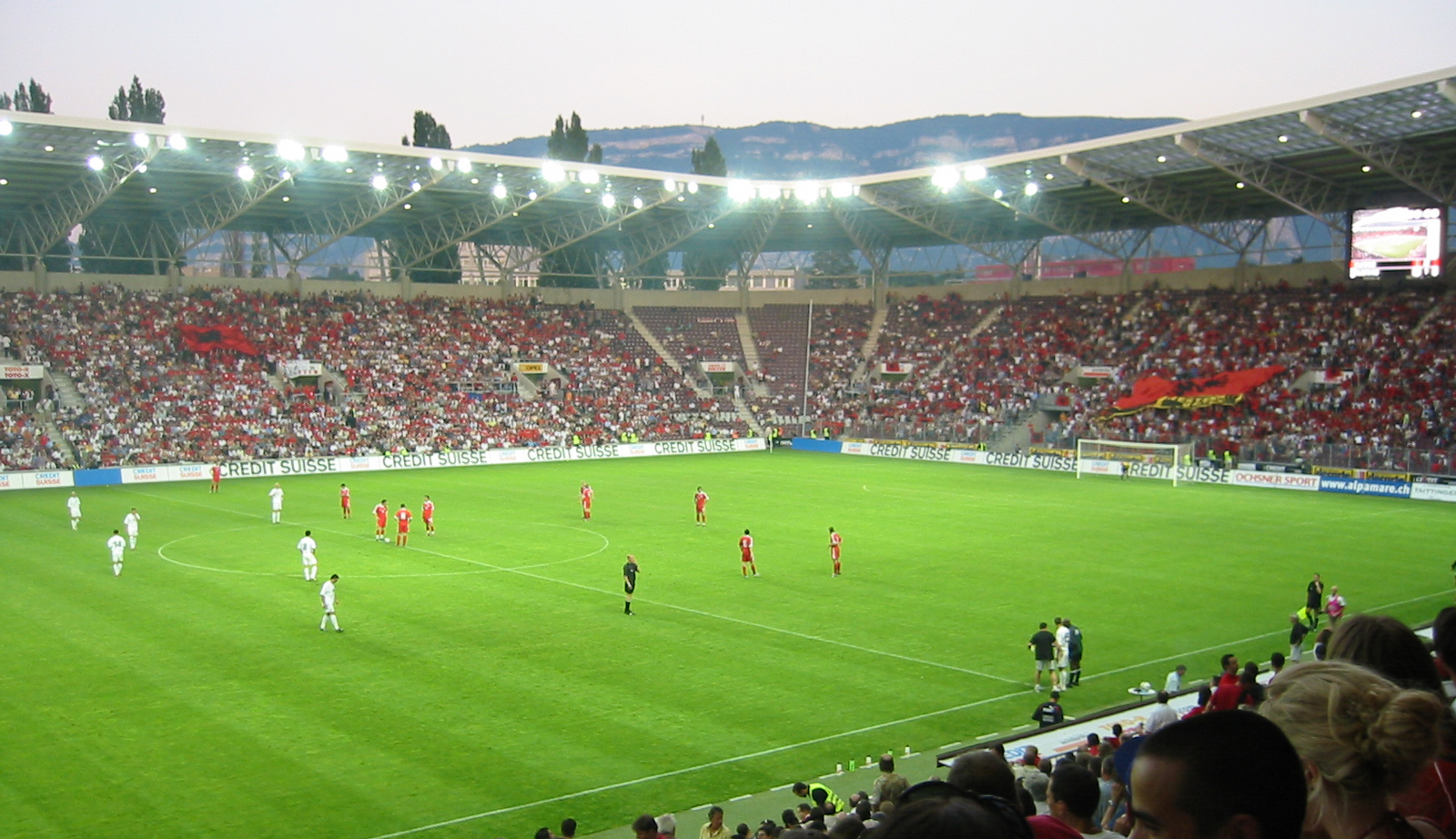
The match between Switzerland and Albania on 11 June 2003 at the Stade de Genève, Geneva

Standings and results for Group 10 of the UEFA Euro 2004 qualifying tournament.

Group 10 consisted of Albania, Georgia, Republic of Ireland, Russia and Switzerland. The group winner was Switzerland, finishing one point ahead of Russia, who qualified for the play-offs.

== Standings ==
Pos	Team	Pld	W	D	L	GF	GA	GD	Pts	Qualification	(Switzerland)	(Russia)	(Republic of Ireland)	(Albania)	(Georgia (country))
1	Switzerland	8	4	3	1	15	11	+4	15	Qualify for final tournament	—	2–2	2–0	3–2	4–1
2	Russia	8	4	2	2	19	12	+7	14	Advance to play-offs	4–1	—	4–2	4–1	3–1
3	Republic of Ireland	8	3	2	3	10	11	−1	11		1–2	1–1	—	2–1	2–0
4	Albania	8	2	2	4	11	15	−4	8		1–1	3–1	0–0	—	3–1
5	Georgia	8	2	1	5	8	14	−6	7		0–0	1–0 (Note: The Georgia v Russia match originally was played on 12 October 2002, but was abandoned at half-time with the score 0–0 due to floodlight failure and rescheduled.)	1–2	3–0	—

Source: UEFA
Rules for classification: Qualification tiebreakers

== Matches ==
7 September 2002
17:00 UTC+4

Russia	4–2	Republic of Ireland
Karyaka 20'; Beschastnykh 24'; Kerzhakov 71'; Babb 88' (o.g.)	Report	Doherty 69'; Morrison 76'

Lokomotiv Stadium, Moscow
Attendance: 26,000
Referee: Claude Colombo (France)
8 September 2002
16:00 UTC+2

Switzerland	4–1	Georgia
Frei 37'; H. Yakin 62'; Müller 74'; Chapuisat 81'	Report	Arveladze 62'

St. Jakob Park, Basel
Attendance: 20,500
Referee: Vladimir Krisnak (Slovakia)

12 October 2002
17:00 UTC+4

Georgia	Abandoned (Note: The Georgia v Russia match was originally played on 12 October 2002, but was abandoned by referee Tom Henning Øvrebø at half-time with the score 0–0 due to floodlight failure. The match was rescheduled for 30 April 2003.)	Russia
	Report

Mikheil Meskhi Stadium, Tbilisi
Attendance: 22,000
Referee: Tom Henning Øvrebø (Norway)
12 October 2002
20:00 UTC+2

Albania	1–1	Switzerland
Murati 79'	Report	M. Yakin 37'

Qemal Stafa Stadium, Tirana
Attendance: 14,000
Referee: Orhan Erdemir (Turkey)

16 October 2002
17:00 UTC+4

Russia	4–1	Albania
Kerzhakov 3'; Semak 42', 55'; Onopko 52'	Report	Duro 13'

Central Stadium, Volgograd
Attendance: 17,200
Referee: Leif Sundell (Sweden)
16 October 2002
20:30 UTC+1

Republic of Ireland	1–2	Switzerland
Magnin 78' (o.g.)	Report	H. Yakin 45'; Celestini 87'

Lansdowne Road, Dublin
Attendance: 36,000
Referee: Rune Pedersen (Norway)

29 March 2003
18:00 UTC+1

Albania	3–1	Russia
Rraklli 20'; Lala 79'; Tare 82'	Report	Karyaka 76'

Loro Boriçi Stadium, Shkodër
Attendance: 13,000
Referee: Paul Allaerts (Belgium)
29 March 2003
18:00 UTC+4

Georgia	1–2	Republic of Ireland
Kobiashvili 62'	Report	Duff 18'; Doherty 84'

Mikheil Meskhi Stadium, Tbilisi
Attendance: 10,000
Referee: Kyros Vassaras (Greece)

2 April 2003
18:00 UTC+5

Georgia	0–0	Switzerland
	Report

Mikheil Meskhi Stadium, Tbilisi
Attendance: 3,017
Referee: Edo Trivković (Croatia)
2 April 2003
18:30 UTC+2

Albania	0–0	Republic of Ireland
	Report

Qemal Stafa Stadium, Tirana
Attendance: 16,000
Referee: Stefano Farina (Italy)

30 April 2003
17:00 UTC+5

Georgia	1–0	Russia
Asatiani 12'	Report

Mikheil Meskhi Stadium, Tbilisi
Attendance: 11,000
Referee: Franz-Xaver Wack (Germany)

7 June 2003
16:00 UTC+1

Republic of Ireland	2–1	Albania
Keane 6'; Aliaj 90+2' (o.g.)	Report	Skela 8'

Lansdowne Road, Dublin
Attendance: 35,900
Referee: Tomasz Mikulski (Poland)
7 June 2003
20:15 UTC+2

Switzerland	2–2	Russia
Frei 13', 15'	Report	Ignashevich 23', 67' (pen.)

St. Jakob Park, Basel
Attendance: 30,500
Referee: Arturo Dauden Ibañez (Spain)

11 June 2003
20:15 UTC+2

Switzerland	3–2	Albania
Haas 10'; Frei 32'; Cabanas 71'	Report	Lala 22'; Skela 86' (pen.)

Stade de Genève, Geneva
Attendance: 26,000
Referee: Steve Bennett (England)
11 June 2003
20:30 UTC+1

Republic of Ireland	2–0	Georgia
Doherty 43'; Keane 59'	Report

Lansdowne Road, Dublin
Attendance: 36,000
Referee: Eduardo Iturralde González (Spain)

6 September 2003
17:00 UTC+1

Republic of Ireland	1–1	Russia
Duff 35'	Report	Ignashevich 42'

Lansdowne Road, Dublin
Attendance: 36,000
Referee: Ľuboš Micheľ (Slovakia)
6 September 2003
17:00 UTC+5

Georgia	3–0	Albania
Arveladze 8', 43'; Ashvetia 17'	Report

Boris Paichadze Stadium, Tbilisi
Attendance: 3,200
Referee: Nicolai Vollquartz (Denmark)

10 September 2003
18:00 UTC+4

Russia	4–1	Switzerland
Bulykin 19', 32', 58'; Mostovoi 72'	Report	Karyaka 12' (o.g.)

Lokomotiv Stadium, Moscow
Attendance: 28,800
Referee: Pierluigi Collina (Italy)
10 September 2003
20:00 UTC+2

Albania	3–1	Georgia
Hasi 51'; Tare 53'; Bushi 80'	Report	Arveladze 64'

Qemal Stafa Stadium, Tirana
Attendance: 10,500
Referee: Mircea Salomir (Romania)

11 October 2003
17:30 UTC+4

Russia	3–1	Georgia
Bulykin 29'; Titov 45+1'; Sychev 73'	Report	Iashvili 3'

Lokomotiv Stadium, Moscow
Attendance: 30,000
Referee: Konrad Plautz (Austria)
11 October 2003
17:30 UTC+2

Switzerland	2–0	Republic of Ireland
H. Yakin 6'; Frei 60'	Report

St. Jakob-Park, Basel
Attendance: 31,006
Referee: Anders Frisk (Sweden)

== Goalscorers ==
There were 63 goals scored in 21 matches, for an average of 3 goals per match. (Note: The matches tally takes into account fixtures that were subsequently abandoned.)

5 goals

- (Switzerland) Alexander Frei

4 goals

- (Georgia (country)) Shota Arveladze
- (Russia) Dmitri Bulykin

3 goals

- (Republic of Ireland) Gary Doherty
- (Russia) Sergei Ignashevich
- (Switzerland) Hakan Yakin

2 goals

- (Albania) Altin Lala
- (Albania) Ervin Skela
- (Albania) Igli Tare
- (Republic of Ireland) Damien Duff
- (Republic of Ireland) Robbie Keane
- (Russia) Andrei Karyaka
- (Russia) Aleksandr Kerzhakov
- (Russia) Sergei Semak

1 goal

- (Albania) Alban Bushi
- (Albania) Klodian Duro
- (Albania) Besnik Hasi
- (Albania) Edvin Murati
- (Albania) Altin Rraklli
- (Georgia (country)) Malkhaz Asatiani
- (Georgia (country)) Mikheil Ashvetia
- (Georgia (country)) Aleksandre Iashvili
- (Georgia (country)) Levan Kobiashvili
- (Republic of Ireland) Clinton Morrison
- (Russia) Vladimir Beschastnykh
- (Russia) Aleksandr Mostovoi
- (Russia) Viktor Onopko
- (Russia) Dmitri Sychev
- (Russia) Yegor Titov
- (Switzerland) Ricardo Cabanas
- (Switzerland) Fabio Celestini
- (Switzerland) Stéphane Chapuisat
- (Switzerland) Bernt Haas
- (Switzerland) Patrick Müller
- (Switzerland) Murat Yakin

1 own goal

- (Albania) Adrian Aliaj (against Republic of Ireland)
- (Republic of Ireland) Phil Babb (against Russia)
- (Russia) Andrei Karyaka (against Switzerland)
- (Switzerland) Ludovic Magnin (against Republic of Ireland)
