= Altin Lala =

Albanian footballer (born 1975)

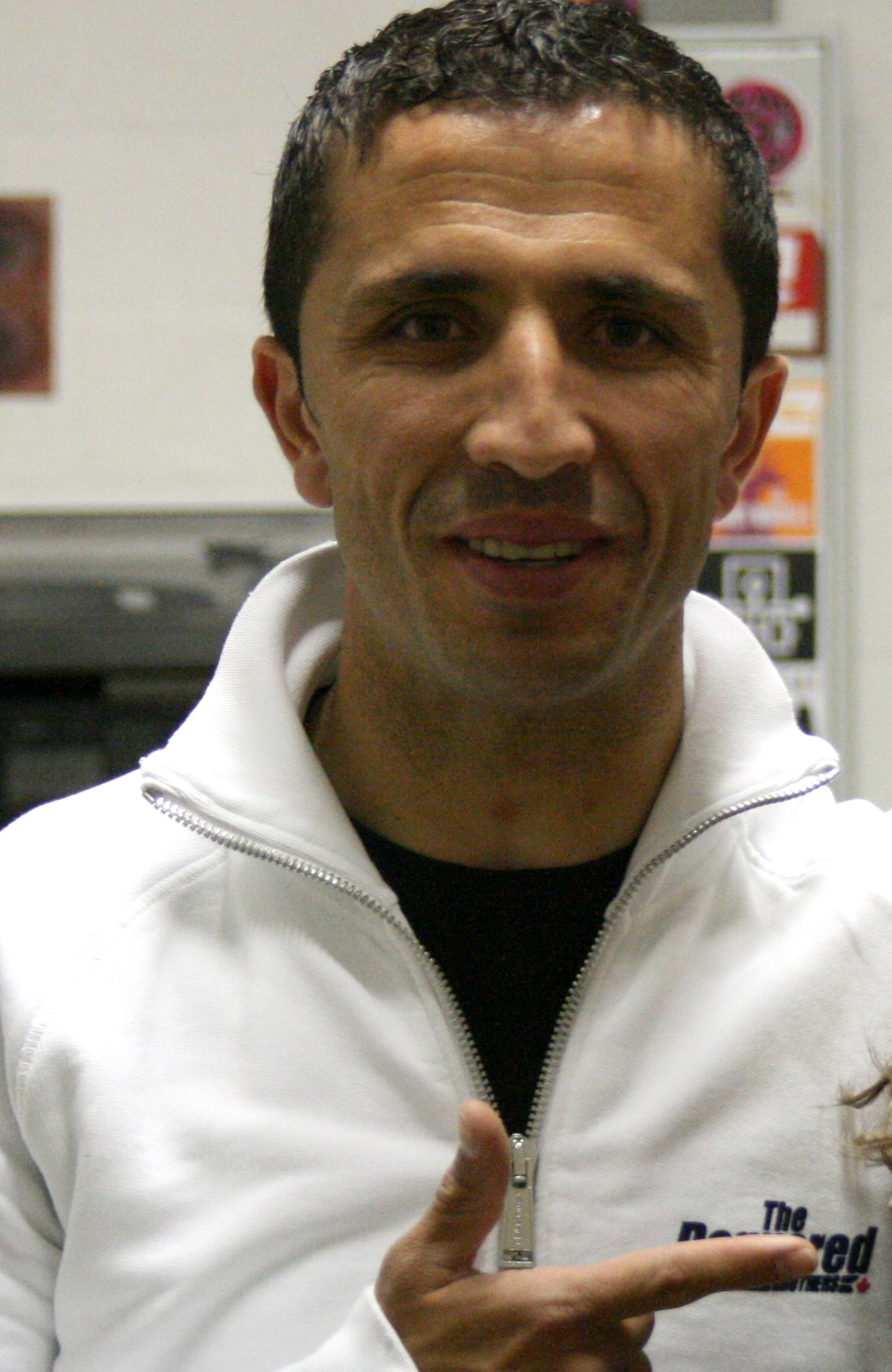
- Lala in 2007

Personal information
- Full name: Altin Dodë Lala
- Date of birth: 18 November 1975 (age 50)
- Place of birth: Tirana, PSR Albania
- Height: 1.72 m (5 ft 8 in)
- Position: Defensive midfielder

Youth career
- 1984–1991: Dinamo Tirana
- 1991–1992: SpVgg Hosenfeld
- 1992–1993: Borussia Fulda

Senior career*
Years	Team	Apps	(Gls)
1994–1998	Borussia Fulda	90	(7)
1998–2012	Hannover 96	296	(11)
2009–2010	Hannover 96 II	5	(1)
2012	Bayern Munich II	3	(0)
Total		394	(19)

International career
1998–2011	Albania	79	(3)

Managerial career
- 2014–2015: Albania (assistant)
- 2014–2015: Albania U19
- * Club domestic league appearances and goals

Altin Dodë Lala (Albanian pronunciation: [aɫˈtin laɫa]; born 18 November 1975) is an Albanian former professional footballer who played as a defensive midfielder and later worked as a football manager. He spent his entire professional club career in Germany, most notably with Hannover 96, and represented the Albania national team at international level.

Born and raised in Tirana, Lala began his football development with the youth academy of Dinamo Tirana before defecting to Germany in 1991 while on international duty with the Albania under-16 team. After adapting to life in Germany and playing for SpVgg Hosenfeld, he joined Borussia Fulda in 1994, where he became one of the club's standout players in the Regionalliga Süd. His consistent performances attracted interest from higher-division sides and ultimately led to his transfer to Hannover 96 in 1998.

During his fourteen-year spell with Hannover 96 (1998–2012), Lala grew into one of the club's most influential and longest-serving players, making more than 300 competitive appearances across all competitions. Renowned for his tireless work rate, aggressive yet fair tackling, and defensive discipline, he played a key role in the club's promotion to the Bundesliga in 2002 and went on to captain the team for several seasons. Under managers including Ralf Rangnick, Ewald Lienen and Peter Neururer, Lala became a symbol of leadership and determination at the club. Despite recurring injuries in his later years, he remained a central squad figure and made his European debut during the 2011–12 UEFA Europa League, helping Hannover reach the quarter-finals. His long tenure concluded in May 2012, when he received a standing ovation in his farewell appearance at the AWD-Arena.

After leaving Hannover, Lala initially intended to retire, but later that year he joined Bayern Munich II following a proposal from his former Hannover teammate Michael Tarnat, then working as a scout at the Bavarian club. In April 2012, he confirmed he would continue his career with Bayern's reserve team in the Regionalliga Bayern under coach Mehmet Scholl. Lala made three appearances before a series of injuries—including a recurring heel problem, an 11-millimetre thigh muscle tear, and a subsequent knee ligament rupture—forced him to retire from professional football in October 2012, bringing an end to his 18-year playing career.

Lala earned 79 caps for the Albania national team between 1998 and 2011, making him one of the country's most-capped players. He made his debut in January 1998 in a friendly match and was part of the squad that won the 2000 Rothmans International Tournament. Over the course of his international career, he represented Albania in seven qualification campaigns for the UEFA European Championship and the FIFA World Cup, and shares the national record for most appearances in UEFA European Championship qualifying matches. He scored three international goals, the first of which came in March 2003 during a UEFA Euro 2004 qualifying victory over Russia. From the beginning of his international tenure, Albania consistently finished above bottom place in every qualifying campaign in which he featured — a marked improvement compared to earlier decades. Appointed captain in 2007 following Igli Tare’s retirement, under coach Otto Barić, he went on to lead the team throughout the 2010 FIFA World Cup and UEFA Euro 2012 qualifying campaigns before retiring from international football in 2011.

After retiring from playing, Lala transitioned into coaching, initially serving as assistant coach of the Albania national football team in 2014 before taking charge of the Albania national under-19 football team. His early managerial work focused on developing youth talent within the national setup, continuing his long association with Albanian football. However he left after less than 2 years of work.

Outside football, Lala has lived in Germany since the late 1990s and later became a German citizen; he currently resides in Hanover, where he is also involved in business and player management.

== Early life ==
Lala was born in Tirana, the capital of Albania, to Dodë and Pashke Lala, who were originally from the Mirditë District in northern Albania. He grew up in the Tirana e Re neighborhood with his family. Like many children in the area, he developed an early interest in football. Although his father initially encouraged him to focus on education, he later supported Lala's decision to join the youth academy of Dinamo Tirana.

In November 1991, aged 15, while playing with the Albania under-16 team in a friendly match in Offenbach, West Germany, Lala was among ten players who remained in Germany after the game and did not return to Albania. Albania was undergoing political and economic transition at the time, and Lala later described living conditions as difficult. He initially stayed with a former school friend in Offenbach before being placed in an asylum centre near Frankfurt. Despite not speaking German, he began adjusting to life in Germany and soon resumed playing football. He joined the local amateur club SpVgg Hosenfeld, where he played alongside other Albanian refugees.

His performances attracted the attention of a coach from Borussia Fulda, who offered him an opportunity to join the club. As an asylum seeker, Lala was not permitted to attend school, so he worked various manual jobs while continuing to train and play football. At the age of 18, he signed his first professional contract with Borussia Fulda, earning 1,200 D-Mark per month.

== Club career ==
=== Borussia Fulda ===
After the first team of Borussia Fulda earned promotion to the third-tier Oberliga Hessen, Lala was mostly an unused substitute during the second half of the 1993–94 season, making two appearances. In the following season, the Oberliga Hessen became part of the fourth tier of German football, and Lala featured in eight matches as the club finished eighth in the league.

Following the club's unsuccessful attempt to qualify for the Regionalliga, new head coach Martin Hohmann rebuilt the squad largely around local talents and young players, including Lala, then 19 years old. He quickly became one of the key figures of the team and, according to Fuldaer Zeitung, made “a huge career leap within a few months.” Lala established himself as a regular starter during the 1995–96 campaign, making 24 appearances and scoring his first goal for the club that season. Borussia Fulda finished first in the table, earning promotion to the Regionalliga Süd for the following season.

Lala debuted in the 1996–97 Regionalliga season, when Borussia Fulda was regarded as one of the stronger sides in the league, featuring Lala and top scorer Olivier Djappa among its key players. He made 23 league appearances, including 14 starts and nine as a substitute, scoring two goals in consecutive home victories in mid-March 1997 — a 4–1 win against VfR Mannheim and a 3–1 win over KSV Hessen Kassel — contributing to Fulda's fourth-place finish.

In the following 1997–98 Regionalliga season, Lala became an undisputed starter, appearing in 33 league matches. The few games he missed were due to suspensions, as he collected seven yellow cards and one red card during the campaign. He also scored four goals, three of which were decisive in Fulda's victories.

That season marked one of the club's most successful periods in the 1990s. Under coach Martin Hohmann, Borussia Fulda was briefly in contention for promotion to the 2. Bundesliga, attracting crowds of up to 18,000 spectators at the Johannisau Stadium. Local reports later described this period as a “golden era” for the club, with players such as Lala and Djappa gaining recognition and subsequently progressing to higher divisions.

=== Hannover 96 ===
==== Early years (1998–2001) ====
On 21 July 1998, Lala signed with newly promoted 2. Bundesliga side Hannover 96. He made his debut on 30 July 1998 in a 1–0 victory over Karlsruher SC. In his first season, he established himself as a regular central midfielder, completing several full matches and scoring three goals in 24 league appearances, including two in consecutive rounds against FC Gütersloh 2000 and 1. FC Köln. Hannover 96 finished fourth with 57 points, one point short of promotion spots to the Bundesliga.

During the 1999–2000 season, Lala was part of Hannover's core midfield under coach Branko Ivanković. He featured regularly in both league and cup matches. After missing several games early due to a knee injury, he returned to the starting lineup in August. In September 1999, Lala received a four-match suspension following a red card against SC Fortuna Köln, returning in October to remain a regular for the rest of the season. He scored in a 2–1 home win over 1. FSV Mainz 05 on 18 March 2000, and again in a 3–5 loss to 1. FC Köln on 9 May 2000. He finished the campaign with 29 total appearances, as Hannover 96 secured a mid-table position.

In the 2000–01 2. Bundesliga season, Lala remained a key midfielder for Hannover 96. He started regularly, contributing in both defensive and attacking phases, and helped integrate younger players such as Sebastian Kehl and Daniel Stendel. Lala scored three league goals that season: in a 5–1 win over SSV Reutlingen 05 on 1 October 2000, a 3–0 win against 1. FC Saarbrücken on 10 February 2001, and a 3–0 victory over Rot-Weiß Oberhausen on 1 April 2001. He was also part of Hannover's 2–1 DFB-Pokal win over FC Hansa Rostock, highlighting his impact in cup competitions. His performances earned him the club's “Player of the Month” award in March 2001. Hannover finished the campaign in mid-table, with Lala recognized as one of the team's experienced leaders.

==== Promotion to Bundesliga (2001–2002) ====
Lala played a central role in Hannover 96's promotion to the Bundesliga at the end of the 2001–02 season, making 31 league appearances and scoring one goal.

He began the season as vice-captain, forming part of the leadership group alongside Jörg Sievers, Carsten Linke, and Steve Cherundolo. Within coach Ralf Rangnick's system, Lala operated primarily as a defensive midfielder and remained a regular starter throughout the campaign. Despite sustaining minor injuries — including a broken hand in October 2001 and a muscle strain in March 2002 — he missed few matches and consistently returned to the lineup. His only league goal came in a 4–2 away win against Alemannia Aachen on 28 January 2002, a result that extended Hannover's unbeaten run. In November 2001, Lala was voted the club's “Player of the Month,” and he later finished second in the end-of-season “Player of the Season” poll behind Jan Šimák and ahead of Nebojša Krupniković. In March 2002, he extended his contract with Hannover 96 until June 2005, turning down interest from clubs including Bayer 04 Leverkusen and Hamburger SV. The new contract included a release clause allowing a transfer only to a Champions League club for a fixed fee of €4 million. On 31 March 2002, Hannover secured promotion with a 6–0 home victory over 1. FC Schweinfurt 05. Lala concluded the campaign as one of the squad's most regularly used players, contributing both in midfield and within the team's leadership structure.

==== Bundesliga and rise to captaincy (2002–2004) ====
Lala made his Bundesliga debut on 11 August 2002 in a 2–1 away defeat to Hamburger SV on the opening day of the 2002–03 season. The match marked Hannover 96's return to the top flight after thirteen years, with Lala starting in central midfield. He remained a regular starter throughout the campaign and played a prominent role in coach Ralf Rangnick’s tactical setup. In October 2002, he received his fifth yellow card of the season in a 3–3 draw with FC Bayern Munich. In December, he sustained a broken nose in a training collision with teammate Daniel Stendel but returned to action shortly afterward wearing a protective mask. Lala finished the season with 34 appearances in all competitions as Hannover 96 secured an 11th-place finish, successfully avoiding relegation.

For the 2003–04 season, Lala was appointed club captain by Rangnick and continued to feature regularly in Hannover's midfield. He entered the campaign as a first-team fixture and was noted for his consistency across the opening months. A series of minor injuries limited his involvement between November 2003 and February 2004, but he regained his place in the lineup after returning to full fitness. In March 2004, following a prolonged run of poor results, Rangnick was replaced by Ewald Lienen, who maintained Lala as captain for the remainder of the season. Under Lienen, Hannover secured their Bundesliga status through several positive results in the closing rounds. Lala made 27 appearances in all competitions during the campaign, with the team finishing in mid-table.

==== Captaincy establishment (2004–2007) ====
Lala remained team captain under Ewald Lienen for the 2004–05 season, during which Hannover 96 maintained consistent performances. At the beginning of the season, he was again confirmed as club captain, with Steven Cherundolo and Michael Tarnat serving as his deputies. Although he experienced minor setbacks, including a muscle strain and brief illness spells in October and April 2005, Lala continued to feature regularly in midfield. In December 2004, he extended his contract with Hannover 96 until June 2007. He made 29 Bundesliga appearances during the season as Hannover finished in mid-table.

During the 2005–06 season, Lala continued as captain under both Lienen and his successor Peter Neururer. He dealt with recurring injury issues in pre-season and early in the campaign but remained part of the regular rotation in Hannover's midfield. Lala missed several matches due to suspensions and injuries, including a three-match DFB ban in January 2006 following a red card against Hertha BSC and another dismissal in April during a 3–3 draw with VfB Stuttgart. He finished the season with 29 league appearances as Hannover placed 12th in the Bundesliga. He also made three DFB-Pokal appearances, with Hannover reaching the round of 16 before being eliminated by SV Werder Bremen.

In the 2006–07 Bundesliga season, Lala began as a first-team regular but was sidelined in October after sustaining a knee ligament injury while on international duty. Although fitness issues persisted throughout the season, he returned during the second half of the campaign and made several appearances before recurring knee problems ruled him out of the final matches. On 31 January 2007, he scored his only goal of the season in a 5–0 home win over Hertha BSC. Lala concluded the season with 17 Bundesliga appearances as Hannover finished 11th. He also captained the team to the quarter-finals of the DFB-Pokal, where Hannover were eliminated by 1. FC Nürnberg after a penalty shoot-out.

==== Captaincy change and persistent injuries ====
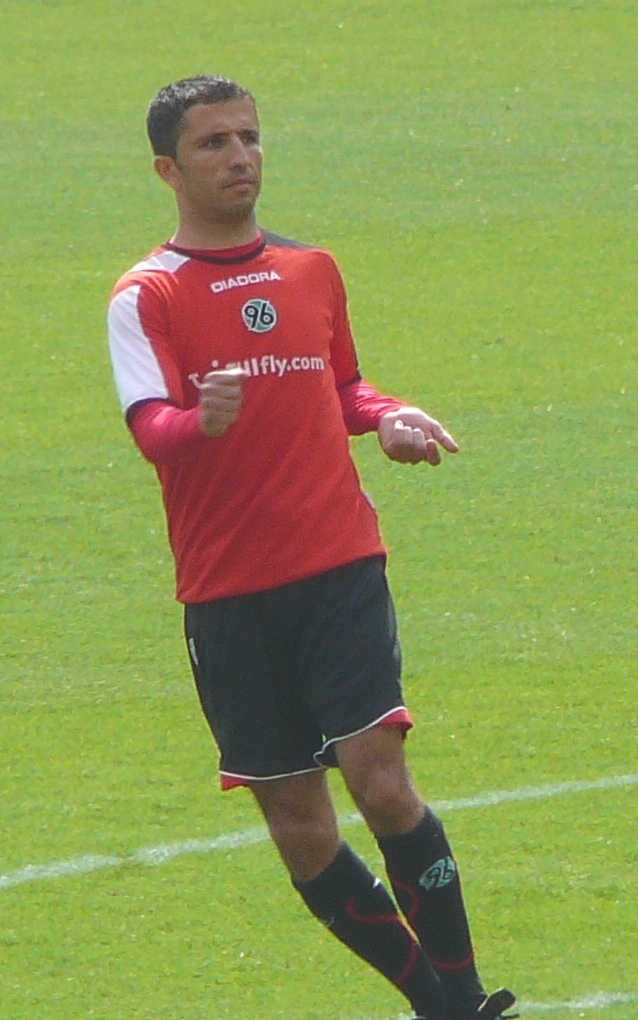
Altin Lala with Hannover 96 in April 2008

Ahead of the 2007–08 Bundesliga season, a new captaincy vote was held at Hannover 96 in which Lala narrowly lost to goalkeeper Robert Enke. Following the decision, Lala continued to serve as vice-captain and remained part of the team's leadership group. He began the campaign as a regular starter. Lala received a red card in the second match of the season against FC Bayern Munich on 27 August 2007 and later missed several games due to minor injuries, including a shin bruise sustained in September. He returned to the starting lineup in October and featured regularly until the winter break as Hannover maintained mid-table form during the first half of the campaign. Lala made 28 domestic appearances as Hannover 96 finished eighth in the Bundesliga, the club's best position since his arrival.

During the 2008–09 Bundesliga season, Lala started the opening matches but gradually lost his regular place as Hannover went through an inconsistent period. He sustained a back injury in the autumn that sidelined him for several months. By early 2009, Lala was working toward full fitness and made several appearances for Hannover 96 II in the Regionalliga Nord, scoring once against Altona 93 on 28 February 2009. After nearly 100 days out, he returned to the first-team squad in March 2009, shortly after Albanian media reported his recovery. In April 2009, Hannover offered Lala a new two-year contract extension, which included a salary adjustment in line with the club's policy for senior players. The decision was supported by club president Martin Kind. Lala made three substitute appearances during the remainder of the campaign, finishing the season with 12 Bundesliga matches as Hannover placed 11th.

At the start of the 2009–10 Bundesliga season, Lala was still recovering from a persistent back injury that had sidelined him since April 2009. He returned to competitive action in early February 2010, starting four consecutive league matches before sustaining a leg injury that required surgery and ruled him out for the remainder of the campaign. Hannover 96 experienced a difficult season, further impacted by the death of captain Robert Enke in November 2009, and ultimately finished 15th, narrowly avoiding relegation.

==== Later years ====
After missing most of the previous campaign due to a leg injury, Lala returned to match fitness by appearing for Hannover 96 II in mid-October 2010. He rejoined the first team in early November and gradually regained playing rhythm, featuring mainly as a late substitute throughout the season. In the final weeks of the campaign, he started two matches, concluding the season with 10 Bundesliga appearances.

During the 2011–12 season, Lala made his European debut in the 2011–12 UEFA Europa League group stage on 29 September 2011, providing an assist for the opening goal scored by Mohammed Abdellaoue in a 2–1 away win against Vorskla Poltava. He also appeared in the following group match against København on 20 October and later captained Hannover in the home encounter with Vorskla Poltava on 15 December 2011, a 3–1 win that secured qualification for the knockout stage. Hannover advanced to the quarter-finals, with Lala making five Europa League appearances during the campaign.

In the 2011–12 Bundesliga, Lala played a more limited role: he started one match, played 45 minutes in another, and made four late substitute appearances. He remained an active member of the squad until the end of the season, when he announced his departure from the club, concluding a 14-year tenure with Hannover 96 that included over 300 competitive appearances. On 5 May 2012, Lala made his final appearance for Hannover in the home fixture against 1. FC Kaiserslautern, receiving a standing ovation from 49,000 spectators at the AWD-Arena, as the club honoured his long-time service from 1998 to 2012. Lala finished his Bundesliga career with 181 appearances and one goal, earning recognition for his consistency, work rate and defensive discipline.

=== Bayern Munich II ===
Although he had initially planned to retire after his contract with Hannover expired in the summer of 2012, Bayern Munich II entered talks with Lala in March 2012 regarding a potential free transfer ahead of the new season. The initiative for the transfer was taken by his former Hannover 96 teammate Michael Tarnat, who was working as a youth scout for Bayern Munich at the time. In April 2012, the 36-year-old confirmed to Bild that he would join Bayern Munich's reserve team for the 2012–13 season, competing in the newly formed Regionalliga Bayern. Lala expressed that he was “very happy” to have the chance to conclude his career at the Bavarian club, whose reserve side was coached at the time by Bayern legend Mehmet Scholl. Lala made three appearances for the club's reserve side before retiring from football later that year due to a series of injuries. He later revealed that he had been coping with a long-standing heel problem dating back to his final seasons at Hannover, followed by an 11-millimetre thigh muscle tear and, after a six-week recovery period, a knee ligament rupture during training, which ultimately brought his playing career to an end.

== International career ==
Lala earned 79 caps for the Albania national team, scoring three goals between 1998 and 2011. At the time of his retirement, he held the national record for most appearances, a mark later surpassed by Lorik Cana in 2014. He captained the team during several qualification campaigns and was regarded as one of Albania's most consistent performers. He shares the record for Albanian international with most appearances in UEFA European Championship qualifying matches, alongside Foto Strakosha, with 29 each.

=== Early international years – Rothmans Tournament triumph and first qualifiers ===
Lala made his international debut under coach Astrit Hafizi on 21 January 1998 in a friendly match against Turkey, coming on as a half-time substitute for Përparim Daiu. During his time on the pitch, Albania scored three goals to secure a 4–1 away victory at the İzmir Atatürk Stadium. Notably, he became the first player to represent Albania who had never played for a domestic club, as he was with SC Borussia Fulda in Germany at the time. Following his debut, Lala quickly established himself as a regular starter for the national team and went on to participate in the 1998 Rothmans International Tournament in Malta, playing every minute as Albania drew with the hosts Malta (1–1), Latvia (2–2), and narrowly lost to Georgia, finishing third overall. He also featured in the 2000 edition, where Albania went on to win the competition — marking one of the national team's earliest tournament successes in the modern era.

He was an important member of the squad during this period, featuring regularly in the UEFA Euro 2000 qualifying campaign — his first major international qualification cycle. Lala made his competitive debut on 5 September 1998 in the opening Group 2 match against Georgia, which ended in a 1–0 defeat. This era marked a transitional phase for the Albania national team under coach Hafizi, as several younger players such as Lala and Erjon Bogdani became regular selections alongside experienced figures including Rudi Vata, Foto Strakosha, Bledar Kola, Alban Bushi, Igli Tare and Altin Rraklli. Throughout the Euro 2000 qualifying campaign, Lala remained a consistent presence in Albania's midfield, starting and completing 90 minutes in eight of the team's ten group matches. Operating primarily as a central or defensive midfielder, he balanced defensive duties with forward support, contributing to the team's improved stability. Although Albania were still rebuilding, the campaign was regarded as one of the most encouraging in years. The team secured four draws against stronger opponents and concluded with a 2–1 home victory over Georgia, allowing Albania to surpass them in the standings by two points and finish second from bottom — the first time in any European Championship qualifying campaign that Albania avoided last place. Lala remained a regular selection during the 2002 FIFA World Cup qualifying campaign as well. Competing in a difficult Group 9 that included world-class sides such as Germany and England, Albania struggled to obtain results and failed to record a point in the matches in which Lala featured. He registered an assist in the home fixture against England, which ended in a 3–1 defeat.

=== First goals and qualifiers for Euro 2004 & 2006 World Cup ===
Lala's growing influence was evident during the UEFA Euro 2004 qualifying campaign, where he established himself as one of Albania's most reliable performers. He scored his first international goal on 29 March 2003 in a qualifying match against Russia, netting in the 79th minute. The match, played at the Loro Boriçi Stadium in Shkodër, ended in a 3–1 victory for Albania, a result widely noted in the country. His second goal came three months later during the same qualifying campaign, in a 3–2 defeat to the Switzerland. Beyond his goals, Lala also contributed to other positive results, including draws against the Republic of Ireland and Switzerland. Due to an injury sustained with Hannover 96, he missed the double-header against Georgia in September 2003, where Albania again defeated Georgia in the closing stages of the campaign to finish above them and avoid bottom place in the group.

He remained an ever-present figure in the following 2006 FIFA World Cup qualifying campaign, appearing in all but one of Albania's twelve matches in a challenging seven-team group. The campaign began with a 2–1 home victory over reigning European champions (2004) Greece on 4 September 2004. That same night, a tragic incident occurred in Greece when an Albanian immigrant supporter celebrating the win was attacked and killed by local hooligans. Despite the promising start, Albania faced a demanding schedule against opponents such as Ukraine, Denmark and Turkey, suffering a series of narrow defeats — five of them by identical 2–0 scores — but securing further wins against Kazakhstan twice and Georgia once, along with a draw against Ukraine. The team ultimately collected a total of 13 points, finishing third from bottom in the group — its highest points tally and best World Cup qualifying placement up to that time.

=== Captaincy and later years ===
On 29 May 2005, Lala captained Albania for the first time in a 1–0 friendly defeat against Poland. His third and last international goal came in his 51st appearance for Albania, on 16 August 2006 against San Marino.

During the UEFA Euro 2008 qualifying campaign, Lala was a regular starter, featuring in ten of Albania's twelve matches. He missed two fixtures in June 2007 due to a knee problem. In the opening phase of the qualifiers, he was substituted in all three early matches in 2006, each ending by a two-goal margin and yielding one point. After the mid-campaign retirement of Igli Tare from international duty, Lala was appointed team captain by manager Otto Barić in early 2007. He occasionally shared the captaincy with Ervin Skela and Klodian Duro before becoming the full-time captain later that year. Albania produced several competitive results, including three goalless draws and a 1–1 draw against Bulgaria and Slovenia in two legs each. The team finished the campaign in fifth place in the seven-team group.

During the 2010 FIFA World Cup qualifying campaign, Lala began as a key starter for Albania, featuring in back-to-back clean sheets — a goalless draw against Sweden and a 3–0 home win over Malta.

In October 2008, he played the entire match in a 0–0 draw away to Portugal, achieved despite Albania being reduced to ten men after Admir Teli’s red card involving Cristiano Ronaldo. He completed two further matches against Hungary, both ending in defeat. His involvement for the remainder of the campaign was reduced due to injury problems, including a herniated disc and a torn muscle fiber, which sidelined him for several months as Albania finished fifth in the group.

By the end of the decade, Lala had become one of Albania's most capped and longest-serving internationals.

During the UEFA Euro 2012 qualifying campaign, Lala missed the opening four matches due to knee surgery. He returned in March 2011, playing the full match in a 1–0 victory over Belarus, marking his 74th appearance and surpassing Foto Strakosha as Albania's most-capped player. He then featured regularly throughout the remainder of the campaign, which included four consecutive defeats — among them a loss to Luxembourg — before concluding with a 1–1 home draw against Romania on 11 October 2011, his final international appearance.

== Managerial career ==
On 3 March 2014, Lala was presented as assistant coach of the Albania national team by head coach Gianni De Biasi, replacing previous assistant Angelo Pereni. On 12 August 2014, he was appointed head coach of the Albania under-19 national team, following the departure of Foto Strakosha to join Olympiacos. Under his management, Albania participated in the 2015 UEFA European Under-19 Championship qualification, where the team faced Denmark, Portugal, and Wales, losing all three matches.

In August 2015, Lala stepped down from his position as Albania U19 head coach for personal reasons, and was succeeded by Arjan Bellai.

== Personal life ==
Lala was born in Tirana, Albania, and later settled in Germany, where he spent the majority of his professional career. He renounced his Albanian citizenship in order to acquire German nationality, as German law generally does not allow dual citizenship. Lala resides in Hanover, Germany, with his Italian wife Vittoria and their two children, Kataldo (born 2002) and Gabriela (born 2004). With the support of Hannover 96 president Martin Kind, he partnered with German entrepreneur Dirk Rossmann to establish the retail chain "Rossmann & Lala" in Albania, operating nine branches and employing around 180 people.

Following his retirement as a player, Lala founded a football agency and has since worked as a players’ manager and agent, most notably representing Albanian-Kosovar winger Milot Rashica in his transfers and career development.

== Career statistics ==
=== Club ===
Appearances and goals by club, season and competition
Club	Season	League			Cup		Europe		Total	
Club	Season	Division	Apps	Goals	Apps	Goals	Apps	Goals	Apps	Goals
Borussia Fulda	1993–94	Oberliga Hessen	2	0	—		—		2	0
Borussia Fulda	1994–95	Oberliga Hessen	8	0	—		—		8	0
Borussia Fulda	1995–96	Oberliga Hessen	24	1	—		—		24	1
Borussia Fulda	1996–97	Regionalliga Süd	23	2	—		—		23	2
Borussia Fulda	1997–98	Regionalliga Süd	33	4	—		—		33	4
Borussia Fulda	Total		90	7	—		—		90	7
Hannover 96	1998–99	2. Bundesliga	24	3	1	0	—		25	3
Hannover 96	1999–2000	2. Bundesliga	29	2	—		—		29	2
Hannover 96	2000–01	2. Bundesliga	31	3	2	1	—		33	4
Hannover 96	2001–02	2. Bundesliga	31	1	3	0	—		34	1
Hannover 96	2002–03	Bundesliga	32	0	2	0	—		34	0
Hannover 96	2003–04	Bundesliga	12	0	—		—		12	0
Hannover 96	2004–05	Bundesliga	32	0	4	0	—		36	0
Hannover 96	2005–06	Bundesliga	29	0	3	0	—		32	0
Hannover 96	2006–07	Bundesliga	17	1	3	0	—		20	1
Hannover 96	2007–08	Bundesliga	27	1	1	0	—		28	1
Hannover 96	2008–09	Bundesliga	12	0	1	0	—		13	0
Hannover 96	2009–10	Bundesliga	4	0	—		—		4	0
Hannover 96	2010–11	Bundesliga	10	0	—		—		10	0
Hannover 96	2011–12	Bundesliga	6	0	0	0	4 (Note: Appearances in 2011–12 UEFA Europa League)	0	10	0
Hannover 96	Total		296	11	20	1	4	0	320	12
Hannover 96 II	2008–09	Regionalliga Nord	3	1	—		—		3	1
Hannover 96 II	2010–11	Regionalliga Nord	2	0	—		—		2	0
Hannover 96 II	Total		5	1	—		—		5	1
Bayern Munich II	2012–13	Regionalliga Bayern	3	0	—		—		3	0
Career total			394	19	20	1	4	0	418	20

=== International ===
Appearances and goals by national team and year
National team	Year	Apps	Goals
Albania	1998	7	0
Albania	1999	6	0
Albania	2000	3	0
Albania	2001	6	0
Albania	2002	5	0
Albania	2003	5	2
Albania	2004	7	0
Albania	2005	9	0
Albania	2006	6	1
Albania	2007	9	0
Albania	2008	6	0
Albania	2009	1	0
Albania	2010	2	0
Albania	2011	7	0
Total		79	3

Scores and results list Albania's goal tally first, score column indicates score after each Lala goal.

List of international goals scored by Altin Lala
No.	Date	Venue	Opponent	Score	Result	Competition	Ref.
1	29 March 2003	Loro Boriçi Stadium, Shkodër, Albania	Russia	2–1	3–1	UEFA Euro 2004 qualifying	
2	11 June 2003	Stade de Genève, Geneva, Switzerland	Switzerland	1–1	2–3	UEFA Euro 2004 qualifying	
3	16 August 2006	Stadio Olimpico, Serravalle, San Marino	San Marino	3–0	3–0	Friendly	

== Honours ==
Hannover 96

- 2. Bundesliga: 2001–02

Sporting positions
Preceded by	Hannover 96 captain 2004–2007	Succeeded by Robert Enke
Preceded by Igli Tare	Albania national team captain 2007–2011	Succeeded by Lorik Cana
