= Florian Myrtaj =

Albanian footballer

Personal information
- Date of birth: 15 September 1976 (age 50)
- Place of birth: Vlorë, Albania
- Height: 1.83 m (6 ft 0 in)
- Positions: Winger; striker

Youth career
- 1989–1994: Modena

Senior career*
Years	Team	Apps	(Gls)
1994–1995	Modena	1	(0)
1995–1997	Sassuolo	51	(7)
1997–1999	Reggiolo	64	(23)
1999–2000	Alzano Virescit	1	(0)
1999–2000	→ Teramo (loan)	27	(6)
2000–2002	Teramo	53	(41)
2002–2003	Cesena	28	(12)
2003–2005	Verona	45	(13)
2005–2006	Catanzaro	26	(4)
2006	Perugia	15	(0)
2006–2007	Teramo	33	(8)
2007–2008	Arezzo	18	(6)
2008–2010	Sorrento	41	(14)

International career
2002–2006	Albania	25	(3)
- * Club domestic league appearances and goals

Florian Myrtaj (born 15 September 1976) is an Albanian former footballer who played as a forward.

Myrtaj, who moved to Italy in 1989, aged 13, after having been signed by the Modena F.C. youth section, is also an Italian citizen.

== Club career ==
Myrtaj was born in Vlorë. He reached his highlight during his period at Verona, then in Serie B, where he spent two seasons with a total 13 goals.

Before joining Verona he was signed by Parma in 2002 and sold to Cesena in co-ownership deal along with Christian Terlizzi. In June 2003, Parma bought back Myrtaj and sold him to Verona. After leaving Verona in 2005, he had an unimpressive time at Catanzaro, again in Serie B, before returning to play in the third tier with a number of other teams, including a lacklustre return at Teramo; in September 2008 he joined Sorrento from Arezzo, and spent two seasons with the Campanian side.

== International career ==
He made his debut for Albania in a January 2002 Bahrain Tournament match against Macedonia and earned a total of 25 caps, scoring 3 goals. His final international was a March 2006 friendly match against Lithuania.

=== International statistics ===
Albania national team
Year	Apps	Goals
2002	6	0
2003	6	2
2004	6	0
2005	6	1
2006	1	0
Total	25	3

=== International goals ===
#	Date	Venue	Opponent	Score	Result	Competition
1.	12 February 2003	Stadio Comunale, Bastia Umbra, Italy	Vietnam	5–0	Won	Friendly
2.	12 February 2003	Stadio Comunale, Bastia Umbra, Italy	Vietnam	5–0	Won	Friendly
3.	3 September 2005	Qemal Stafa Stadium, Tirana, Albania	Kazakhstan	2–1	Won	2006 World Cup qual.
Correct as of 7 October 2015

== Post-playing career ==
After retirement, Myrtaj worked as a scout for Modena from July 2013 to February 2014.
