= Daniar Kenzhekhanov =

Kazakhstani footballer

Personal information
- Full name: Daniar Kenzhekhanov
- Date of birth: 20 January 1983 (age 43)
- Place of birth: Soviet Union
- Height: 1.88 m (6 ft 2 in)
- Position: Forward

Senior career*
Years	Team	Apps	(Gls)
2002	CSKA Zhiger Almaty	25	(0)
2003	Caspiy	14	(3)
2004	Karasay Sarbazdary	22	(10)
2005	Vostok	28	(6)
2006–2008	Almaty	23	(4)
2008	Tobol	2	(0)
2009–2010	Vostok	27	(4)
2010–	Okzhetpes	3	(0)
2011–2012	CSKA Almaty	27	(3)
2012	Bayterek	0	(0)

International career^{‡}
2005–2006	Kazakhstan	6	(1)
- * Club domestic league appearances and goals as of 8 July 2012 ‡ National team caps and goals as of 8 July 2012

Daniar Kenzhekhanov (Kazakh: Дәнияр Кенжеханов; born 20 January 1983) is a Kazakhstani professional footballer. He plays as a forward for the Kazakhstan national football team and FC Bayterek since July 2012.

As of July 2007 he has 6 caps and scored a goal for the national team, including scoring a goal in a 2006 FIFA World Cup qualifier against Georgia on 17 August 2005.
