= Alban Bushi =

Albanian footballer (born 1973)

Personal information
- Date of birth: 20 August 1973 (age 53)
- Place of birth: Tirana, PR Albania
- Height: 1.80 m (5 ft 11 in)
- Position: Forward

Team information
- Current team: Albania U21 (manager)

Youth career
- Tirana

Senior career*
Years	Team	Apps	(Gls)
1992–1997	Tirana	27	(24)
1994	→ Szegedi (loan)	20	(7)
1994–1995	→ FC Remscheid (loan)		
1996	→ Flamurtari Vlorë (loan)	16	(7)
1997	Apollon Athens	13	(3)
1998–1999	Litex Lovech	37	(14)
1999–2000	Adanaspor	29	(10)
2000–2005	İstanbulspor	96	(26)
2001–2003	→ Trabzonspor (loan)	12	(0)
2004–2005	Partizani Tirana	14	(5)
2005–2010	Levadiakos	49	(9)
2006–2008	→ Apollon Kalamarias (loan)	41	(13)
2010	Tirana	5	(0)
Total		359	(118)

International career
1992–1993	Albania U21	2	(0)
1995–2007	Albania	67	(14)

Managerial career
- 2015: Albania U16
- 2016–: Albania U21
- 2017–: Albania U20
- * Club domestic league appearances and goals

Alban Bushi (born 20 August 1973) is an Albanian professional football coach and former player who is the manager of Albania under-21 and under-20 team. He is nicknamed "Loku".

A forward, Bushi played for 12 clubs in six countries during his 19-year career. He started his career with capital club Tirana where he had an impressive goal-per-game ratio; he also had three short spells on loan with Szegedi in Hungary, FC Remscheid in Germany and Flamurtari Vlorë in Albania. He then went off to Greece to play for a short time at Apollon Athens. Following that he enjoyed a decent time at Litex Lovech before spending the next four years in Turkey by representing Adanaspor, İstanbulspor, and Trabzonspor.

Bushi returned to Albania in the middle of 2004 to play for one season with Partizani Tirana before returning to Greece, where he would spend the next five years at Levadiakos. At the end of his career, Bushi returned to Albania once again to represent Tirana, stating that it was a "moral debt" to end his career where it started. He retired from football in November 2010.

Bushi also had a successful international career, being part of Albania national team for 12 years. With 14 goals, he was Albania's all-time leading top scorer from 2004 until Erjon Bogdani overtook him in 2011. He retired from international football in 2007.

== Club career ==
Bushi enjoyed a long playing career which saw him play for 12 clubs in six countries. He started off his career in Albania with Tirana. He made his professional debut for Tirana in the 1992–93 season and after spending two seasons with the club, he then moved to Hungary with Szegedi. Soon after he was transferred in Germany to FC Remscheid. After two years abroad, he made a return to Albania, playing for two years between Tirana and Flamurtari Vlorë. He then moved to Greece signing for Apollon Smyrnis and right after a half season, he headed off to Bulgaria to join Litex Lovech, where he became the first foreigner to captain the team. He spent two seasons in the Bulgarian A Football Group, winning them both.

After his spell in Bulgaria he moved to Turkey to play initially for Adanaspor in the 1999–2000 1.Lig. Then he signed for fellow 1.Lig side Istanbulspor. In his first season 2000–01 he scored 12 goals in 29 matches as İstanbulspor finished 12th. In the next season 2001–02 he played 16 games in where he scored four goals in the first-half before moving on loan to another Süper Lig team Trabzonspor with whom he played only five matches but unable to score. He was part of Trabzonspor for another half season in 2002–03 playing seven matches failing once again to score, before returning to Istanbulspor for the second half in which he played 14 matches managing 4 goals to contribute in team's 9th place. In the 2003–04 season Bushi played 21 games and scored 5 goals to help Istanbulspor avoid relegation with one point above 16th place Bursaspor. He was part of the team in the first half of the 2004–05 Süper Lig playing 16 matches scoring once before returning to Albania after many years playing abroad and signed with Partizani Tirana for the second half of the 2004–05 Albanian Superliga; he played 14 games and netted 5 goals. He then went off to Greece again to join AE Levadiakos. In his first season 2005–06 Alpha Ethniki he played 22 matches often as a starter in which he scored 8 goals as Levadiakos however was relegated to Beta Ethniki. After that he moved on loan at Apollon Kalamarias playing in two seasons in the Super League Greece, 2006–07 and 2007–08. Then, he went back to AE Levadiakos.

Bushi was returned after 13 years to Tirana, the club where his career began, signing on 31 August 2010. He was presented to the media alongside fellow veteran Devi Muka. Although having offers from foreign teams, he felt that he had the moral debt to Tirana to end his career where he started it, a decision that earned Bushi the Swan d'Or from the Albanian Football Association in recognition of his service to Albanian football.

His first game in Albania after over 13 years came on 3 October 2010 in an away game against Skënderbeu Korçë, where he came on as a substitute for Pero Pejic in the 65th minute in a game which ended in a 2–1 loss for Bushi's side. He played his first match as a starter on 31 October against Teuta Durrës, contributing in a 2–0 home win. He finished his final spell with Tirana by playing five league matches, three of them as a starter, failing to score.

On 23 November, he officially announced his retirement from football at the age of 37.

== International career ==
=== Youth ===
Bushi was part of the Albania U21 national team during the 1994 UEFA European Under-21 Championship qualification playing two games both against Germany U21 on 17 November and 22 December 1992.

=== Senior ===
Bushi is a former Albania's all-time top scorer with 14 goals until Erjon Bogdani with his goal against France in 2011 became the new record holder with 15. He made 67 appearances Albania, the tenth highest in the team's history.

Bushi scored on his international debut for Albania on 16 August 1995 against Malta at Ta' Qali National Stadium, netting the temporary equalizer in the 72nd minute in an eventual 2–1 loss. He made his competitive debut on 15 November in the match against Wales for the qualifiers of the UEFA Euro 1996, entering as a second-half substitute in a 1–1 home draw.

== Managerial career ==
On 17 January 2012, Bushi was named as the Albania national team manager, a role which the Albanian Football Association applied for the first time following suggestion of new arrived coach at Albania Gianni De Biasi.

Bushi was named Albania under-16 coach for their participation in the UEFA Development Tournament 2015 in May 2015. He won the tournament by winning all three matches.

Following naming of Paolo Tramezzani as national team director, on 9 December 2016 Bushi was named as the Albania under-21 manager. He won his first game with Albania U21 on 27 March 2017 against Moldova 2–0. In collaboration with the Albanian Football Association, reborned the under-20 side by assigning a friendly versus Georgia on 14 November 2017 at David Petriashvili Stadium, Tbilisi, with Bushi as the coach at the same time along the under-21 national team.

== Career statistics ==
=== Club ===
Appearances and goals by club, season and competition
Club	Season	League			Cup		Europe		Total	
Club	Season	Division	Apps	Goals	Apps	Goals	Apps	Goals	Apps	Goals
Tirana	1992–93	Albanian Superliga	12	8	0	0	—		12	8
Tirana	1993–94	Albanian Superliga	8	6	0	0	—		8	6
Tirana	1995–96	Albanian Superliga	2	3	0	0	—		2	3
Tirana	1996–97	Albanian Superliga	5	7	0	0	—		5	7
Tirana	Total		27	24	0	0	—		27	24
Szegedi (loan)	1993–94	Nemzeti Bajnokság II	20	7	0	0	—		20	7
FC Remscheid (loan)	1994–95	Oberliga Nordrhein			0	0	—			
Flamurtari Vlorë (loan)	1995–96	Albanian Superliga	10	5	0	0	—		10	5
Flamurtari Vlorë (loan)	1996–97	Albanian Superliga	6	2	0	0	—		6	2
Flamurtari Vlorë (loan)	Total		16	7	0	0	—		16	7
Apollon Athens	1997–98	Alpha Ethniki	13	3	0	0	—		13	3
Litex Lovech	1997–98	Bulgarian A Football Group	15	4	0	0	—		15	4
Litex Lovech	1998–99	Bulgarian A Football Group	22	10	0	0	2 (Note: Appearance(s) in UEFA Cup)	0	24	10
Litex Lovech	Total		37	14	0	0	2	0	39	14
Adanaspor	1999–2000	Süper Lig	29	10	0	0	—		29	10
İstanbulspor	2000–01	Süper Lig	29	12	0	0	—		29	12
İstanbulspor	2001–02	Süper Lig	16	4	0	0	—		24	10
İstanbulspor	2002–03	Süper Lig	14	4	0	0	—		14	4
İstanbulspor	2003–04	Süper Lig	21	5	0	0	—		21	5
İstanbulspor	2004–05	Süper Lig	16	1	0	0	—		16	1
İstanbulspor	Total		96	26	0	0	—		96	26
Trabzonspor (loan)	2001–01	Süper Lig	5	0	0	0	—		5	0
Trabzonspor (loan)	2002–03	Süper Lig	7	0	0	0	—		7	0
Trabzonspor (loan)	Total		12	0	0	0	—		12	0
Partizani Tirana	2004–05	Albanian Superliga	14	5	0	0	—		14	5
Levadiakos	2005–06	Super League Greece	22	8	0	0	—		22	8
Levadiakos	2008–09	Super League Greece	19	1	1	0	—		20	1
Levadiakos	2009–10	Super League Greece	8	0	0	0	—		8	0
Levadiakos	Total		49	9	1	0	—		50	9
Apollon Kalamarias (loan)	2006–07	Super League Greece	24	9	1	1	—		25	10
Apollon Kalamarias (loan)	2007–08	Super League Greece	17	4	1	0	—		18	4
Apollon Kalamarias (loan)	Total		41	13	2	1	—		43	14
Tirana	2010–11	Albanian Superliga	5	0	0	0	—		5	0
Career total			359	118	3	1	2	0	364	119

=== International ===
Appearances and goals by national team and year
National team	Year	Apps	Goals
Albania	1995	2	1
Albania	1996	1	0
Albania	1997	6	0
Albania	1998	8	3
Albania	1999	7	2
Albania	2000	5	1
Albania	2001	7	1
Albania	2002	2	0
Albania	2003	9	3
Albania	2004	7	2
Albania	2005	4	1
Albania	2006	1	0
Albania	2007	8	0
Total		67	14

List of international goals scored by Alban Bushi
No.	Date	Venue	Opponent	Score	Result	Competition
1.	16 August 1995	Ta' Qali National Stadium, Ta'Qali, Malta	Malta	1–1	1–2	Friendly
2.	21 January 1998	Atatürk Stadium, Antalya, Turkey	Turkey	3–0	4–1	Friendly
3.	19 August 1998	Makario Stadium, Nicosia, Cyprus	Cyprus	2–0	3–2	Friendly
4.	14 October 1998	Ullevaal Stadion, Oslo, Norway	Norway	1–0	2–2	UEFA Euro 2000 qualifying
5.	4 September 1999	Qemal Stafa Stadium, Tirana, Albania	Latvia	1–1	3–3	UEFA Euro 2000 qualifying
6.	4 September 1999	Qemal Stafa Stadium, Tirana, Albania	Latvia	2–3	3–3	UEFA Euro 2000 qualifying
7.	11 October 2000	Qemal Stafa Stadium, Tirana, Albania	Greece	1–0	2–0	2002 FIFA World Cup qualification
8.	25 April 2001	Gaziantep Kamil Ocak Stadium, Gaziantep, Turkey	Turkey	1–0	2–0	Friendly
9.	12 February 2003	Stadio Comunale, Bastia Umbra, Italy	Vietnam	1–0	5–0	Friendly
10.	10 September 2003	Qemal Stafa Stadium, Tirana, Albania	Georgia	3–1	3–1	UEFA Euro 2004 qualifying
11.	15 November 2003	Qemal Stafa Stadium, Tirana, Albania	Estonia	2–0	2–0	Friendly
12.	31 March 2004	Qemal Stafa Stadium, Tirana, Albania	Iceland	2–1	2–1	Friendly
13.	13 October 2004	Almaty Central Stadium, Almaty, Kazakhstan	Kazakhstan	1–0	1–0	2006 FIFA World Cup qualification
14.	17 August 2005	Qemal Stafa Stadium, Tirana, Albania	Azerbaijan	1–1	2–1	Friendly

== Managerial ==
As of 14 November 2017

Managerial record by team and tenure
Team	From	To	Record				
Team	From	To	P	W	D	L	Win %
Albania U16	27 April 2015	5 May 2015	3	3	0	0	100.0
Albania U21	9 December 2016	Present	8	2	4	2	25.0
Albania U20	24 October 2017	Present	1	0	0	1	0.0
Total			12	5	4	3	41.7

== Honours ==
=== Player ===
Tirana

- Albanian Superliga: 1996–97

Litex Lovech

- Bulgarian A Football Group: 1997–98, 1998–99

=== Manager ===
Albania U16

- UEFA Development Tournament: 2015
