= Edvin Murati =

Albanian footballer (born 1975)

Personal information
- Full name: Edvin Sabri Murati
- Date of birth: 12 November 1975 (age 50)
- Place of birth: Tirana, Albania
- Height: 1.70 m (5 ft 7 in)
- Position: Midfielder

Youth career
- 1989–1990: Partizani Tirana
- 1990–1994: Paris Saint-Germain

Senior career*
Years	Team	Apps	(Gls)
1994–2000	Paris Saint-Germain	24	(1)
1995–1996	→ Châteauroux (loan)	31	(0)
1996–1997	→ Stade Briochin (loan)	1	(0)
1998–1999	→ Fortuna Düsseldorf (loan)	11	(0)
2000–2002	Lille	29	(1)
2002–2006	Iraklis	66	(6)
2006–2008	Panserraikos	25	(8)
Total		179	(15)

International career
1998–2006	Albania	42	(4)
- * Club domestic league appearances and goals

Edvin Sabri Murati (born 12 November 1975) is an Albanian former professional footballer. He played for Panserraikos and Iraklis in Greece. He played also in France, (Note: Edvin Murati – French league stats at LFP – also available in French (archived)) Germany, and for the Albania national team. In December 2018 he was honoured for his services to Albanian football, alongside Perlat Musta and Qamil Teliti.

== International career ==
Murati made his debut for Albania in an August 1998 friendly match away against Cyprus and earned a total of 42 caps, scoring 4 goals. His final international was an October 2006 European Championship qualification match against the Netherlands. In the 2006 FIFA World Cup qualification, he scored a winning goal against UEFA Euro 2004 Champions Team Greece.

== Personal life ==
Edvin Murati holds Albanian and French nationalities. He acquired French nationality by naturalization on 16 February 1998.

== Career statistics ==
Albania national team
Year	Apps	Goals
1998	1	0
1999	4	0
2000	5	2
2001	4	0
2002	6	1
2003	8	0
2004	7	1
2005	5	0
2006	2	0
Total	42	4

#	Date	Venue	Opponent	Score	Result	Competition
1	8 February 2000	National Stadium, Ta' Qali, Malta	Azerbaijan	1–0	1–0	2000 Malta International Football Tournament
2	2 September 2000	FinnAir Stadium, Helsinki, Finland	Finland	1-1	1-2	2002 FIFA World Cup qualification
3	16 October 2002	Qemal Stafa Stadium, Tirana, Albania	Switzerland	1–1	1–1	UEFA Euro 2004 qualifying
4	4 September 2004	Qemal Stafa Stadium, Tirana, Albania	Greece	1-0	2-1	2006 FIFA World Cup qualification
