= Adrian Aliaj =

Albanian footballer (born 1976)

Personal information
- Date of birth: 24 April 1976 (age 50)
- Place of birth: Vlorë, Albania
- Position: Left-back

Senior career*
Years	Team	Apps	(Gls)
1992–1995	Partizani	9	(1)
1995–1996	Hannover 96	2	(0)
1996–1998	Hajduk Split	3	(0)
1998–1999	Standard Liège	24	(1)
2000	Maccabi Petah Tikva	17	(2)
2000–2002	La Louvière	31	(2)
2002–2003	Charleroi	23	(1)
2003–2005	Rot-Weiß Oberhausen	45	(7)
2005–2006	Brest	13	(0)
2006–2007	NK Solin	11	(2)
2007	Al Nassr		

International career
2002–2006	Albania	29	(8)
- * Club domestic league appearances and goals

Adrian Aliaj (born 24 April 1976) is an Albanian former professional footballer who played as a left-back.

== Club career ==
Aliaj started his career at Partizani Tirana in Albania where he made his first team debut at the young age of 16. He then left for Hannover 96 in 1995, then moved to Croatia the season later. He also played for Standard Liège in Belgium for two years until he moved to Israel to play for Maccabi Petah Tikva. He then returned to Belgium with La Louviere and then Charleroi. He left Brest in the summer of 2006 and later played in the Croatian Second Division for NK Solin.

== International career ==
For the Albania national team Aliaj made 29 appearances between 2002 and 2006, scoring eight goals.

== Career statistics ==
Albania national team
Year	Apps	Goals
2002	1	0
2003	10	3
2004	6	4
2005	7	0
2006	5	1
Total	29	8

Scores and results list Albania's goal tally first

#	Date	Venue	Opponent	Goal	Result	Competition
1.	11 October 2003	Estádio do Restelo, Lisbon, Portugal	Portugal	1–1	5–3	Friendly match
2.	11 October 2003	Estádio do Restelo, Lisbon, Portugal	Portugal	4–3	5–3	Friendly match
3.	15 November 2003	Qemal Stafa Stadium, Tiranë, Albania	Estonia	1–0	2–0	Friendly match
4.	18 February 2004	Qemal Stafa Stadium, Tiranë, Albania	Sweden	2–1	2–1	Friendly match
5.	31 March 2004	Qemal Stafa Stadium, Tiranë, Albania	Iceland	1–0	2–1	Friendly match
6.	28 April 2004	A. Le Coq Arena, Tallinn, Estonia	Estonia	0–1	1–1	Friendly match
7.	4 September 2004	Qemal Stafa Stadium, Tiranë, Albania	Greece	2–0	2–1	2006 FIFA World Cup qualifying
8.	1 March 2006	Qemal Stafa Stadium, Tiranë, Albania	Lithuania	1–0	1–2	Friendly match
