= History of Albanian football =

History of association football in Albania

Association football has been played in Albania for over century and is today one of the country's most popular sports. Domestic clubs and a national championship, along with a national team, were established in the 1920s and 1930s. Since the second half of the 20th century, Albania has been a key component of European football.

== Early developments ==
Christian missionaries, from countries where football was already widespread, were witnessed playing football whilst visiting the city of Shkodër in the early 20th century. The game proved popular with the locals and quickly spread throughout the country. Vllaznia was the first football club to be established in 1920, and on 6 June 1930 the Football Association of Albania (FSHF) was founded. Skënderbeu is the oldest football club in Albania and it was funded at the year 1909.

== International ==
=== 1930–45: Pre-history of the Albanian National Football Team ===
Although it never played any matches, the Albania national football team existed before the Albanian Football Association (FSHF) was created in 1930. This is evinced by the registration of the Albanian team in the 1929–31 Balkan Cup a year before the creation of the FSHF. The FSHF was founded on 6 June 1930, and Albania joined FIFA during a congress held between 12 and 16 June, although it never played any matches. Albania was invited to play in the 1934 World Cup, but did not take part due to logistical problems.

=== 1946: Champion of the Balkans ===
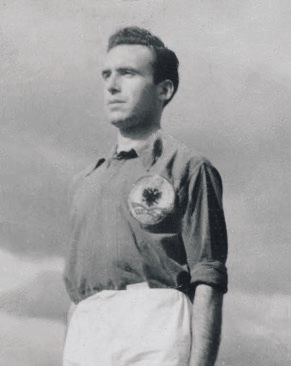
Loro Boriçi captained the national team in winning the 1946 Balkan Cup.

The early years saw a notably successful Balkan Cup run in 1946 as Albania participated for the first time at the Balkan Cup. Albania won their group over favourites Yugoslavia by earning a better goal difference. Albania played also its first ever international match against Yugoslavia in 1946, which ended in a 3–2 home defeat despite an early 2–0 lead at the Qemal Stafa Stadium. Despite that defeat, they defeated Bulgaria with 3–1 in the next match, Albania won the tournament by defeating Romania 1–0 in the final. Albania initially was not expected to participate in the tournament, but the withdrawal of Greece offered Albania a chance to join in the re-established post-war cup.

=== Winning stamp ===
1946 Balkan Cup

Albania
First title

=== Albania historic squad ===
Albania
- Coach: (Socialist Federal Republic of Yugoslavia) Ljubiša Broćić

The following players were called up to participate in the tournament.

Caps and goals as before start of the tournament, otherwise after the match against Montenegro on 22 September 1946.

No.	Pos.	Player	Date of birth (age)	Caps	Goals	Club
	GK	Dodë Tahiri	27 November 1918 (aged 27)	1	0	(Albanian Football Federation) Vllaznia Shkodër
	GK	Giacomo Poselli	22 July 1922 (aged 24)	1	0	(Albanian Football Federation) Flamurtari Vlorë
	DF	Xhavit Demneri	1 January 1919 (aged 27)	0	0	(Albanian Football Federation) Partizani Tirana
	DF	Rexhep Spahiu	21 January 1923 (aged 23)	0	0	(Albanian Football Federation) 17 Nentori Tiranë
	DF	Muhamet Dibra	31 October 1923 (aged 22)	1	0	(Albanian Football Federation) Vllaznia Shkodër
	DF	Bahri Kavaja	23 August 1924 (aged 22)	0	0	(Albanian Football Federation) Vllaznia Shkodër
	DF	Besim Fagu	10 March 1925 (aged 21)	0	0	(Albanian Football Federation) 17 Nentori Tiranë
	MF	Bimo Fakja	1 January 1919 (aged 27)	1	0	(Albanian Football Federation) Vllaznia Shkodër
	MF	Sllave Llambi	26 June 1919 (aged 27)	1	0	(Albanian Football Federation) 17 Nentori Tiranë
	MF	Vasif Biçaku	2 March 1922 (aged 24)	1	0	(Albanian Football Federation) 17 Nentori Tiranë
	MF	Aristidh Parapani	1 January 1926 (aged 20)	0	0	(Albanian Football Federation) 17 Nentori Tiranë
	FW	Qamil Teliti	9 July 1922 (aged 24)	1	2	(Albanian Football Federation) Besa Kavajë
	FW	Loro Boriçi	4 August 1922 (aged 24)	1	0	(Albanian Football Federation) Vllaznia Shkodër
	FW	Pal Mirashi	13 December 1925 (aged 20)	1	0	(Albanian Football Federation) Vllaznia Shkodër

=== Balkan Cup 1946 results ===
7 October 1946

Albania	2–3	Yugoslavia
Mirashi 6'; Teliti 8'	Report	Matošić 47'; Bobek 48'; Čajkovski 78'

Qemal Stafa Stadium, Tirana
Attendance: 20,000
Referee: Radu Istrate (Romania)

9 October 1946

Albania	3–1	Bulgaria
Boriçi 30', 65' (pen.); Mirashi 68'	Report	Spasov 5'

Qemal Stafa Stadium, Tirana
Attendance: 20,000
Referee: Radu Istrate (Romania)

13 October 1946

Albania	1–0	Romania
Teliti 55'	Report

Qemal Stafa Stadium, Tirana
Attendance: 20,000
Referee: Marijan Matančić (Yugoslavia)

=== Table ===
Pos	Team	Pld	W	D	L	GF	GA	GD	Pts	
1	Albania (C)	3	2	0	1	6	4	+2	4	Winners
2	Yugoslavia	3	2	0	1	6	5	+1	4	
3	Romania	3	1	1	1	4	4	0	3	
4	Bulgaria	3	0	1	2	4	7	−3	1	

Updated to match(es) played on 13 October 1946. Source: EU-Football.info
Rules for classification: Rules for classification: 1) points; 2) goal difference; 3) number of goals scored
(C) Champions

=== 1964: In the round of 16 at the 1964 European Nations' Cup for Spain ===
Albania waited until 1962 to compete in a Euro Cup competition and it was so far the only time Albania was between the best 16 teams of the Continent, the reason being Albania got past the first leg as Greece, for political reasons forfeited the games winning both matches 3-0 and 0-3 and 6–0 on aggregate. Albania beat Denmark in the second leg in the round of 16 thanks to an early goal from Panajot Pano. Despite that win Albanian could not progress further as they lost the first leg with 4–0 away from home. At the end of the tournament Albania ranked 9th in Europe. It is so far the most successful campaign for Albania's during the past.

=== 1966-1968 Upsetting Northern Ireland and West Germany during the FIFA and Euro's qualifications ===
Albania took part in the qualifiers for the 1966 World Cup in England, with Northern Ireland, Netherlands and Switzerland drawn in their group. Albania's only point in the group came from a 1–1 home draw to Northern Ireland in Tirana, which denied Northern Ireland a place in the Finals. In UEFA Euro 1968 qualification, Albania had a 0–0 home draw with West Germany that denied the Germans participation in the final tournament. During this day their only non Participation during an UEFA Euro competition. The Germans called it the "Schmach von Tirana", this match is known to this day in Germany as the worst result ever in German Football history.

=== 1964-1972: Playoff attempts during the Olympic Games in Tokyo and Munich ===
Albania participated for the first time in football at the 1964 Summer Olympics in the men's qualification tournament. They faced Bulgaria in the preliminary round, losing both matches, in close games, in the process. They participated for the second and last time ever at the 1972 Summer Olympics in which they faced Romania at the Men's European Qualifiers in the playoffs. Albania lost both matches close with 2–1 away despite an equalizer of Medin Zhega in the first leg. They would lose once again with 1–2 in the second leg despite a leading goal from Panajot Pano. So far their last time participating for any Olympic Games in Football.

=== 1972-1974: Disappointing campaigns for Albania during the 1970s ===
In their UEFA Euro 1972 qualifying they faced in Group 8: West Germany, Poland and Turkey. Albania had a bad start during the campaign, as they lost their first three matches. Poland 3-0 away, Turkey away 2-1 although they were able to equalize with a goal by Astrit Ziu. Their third loss in a row came against Germany in a hard fought match, the Germans won just 0-1 with a goal from Gerd Müller. In the next three matches Albania were able to improve significant, as they were able to draw at the Qemal Stafa Stadium in a draw against Poland 1-1 thanks to an equalizer by Medin Zhega, earning Albania's first point during the qualification. Their next match was a loss against the Germans in the Wildparkstadion in which Netzer and Jürgen Grabowski scored the goals. In their last match they faced Turkey at home. In which the Albanians showed an impressive performance beating turkey 3-0 by two goals from Përnaska and one by Panajot Pano to secure Albania's first and only win during this qualification, in which Albania finished last in the Group with 3 Points but with 5 goals scored and nine conceded during the Qualification.

=== 1980-1984: Tough return to UEFA and FIFA competitions ===
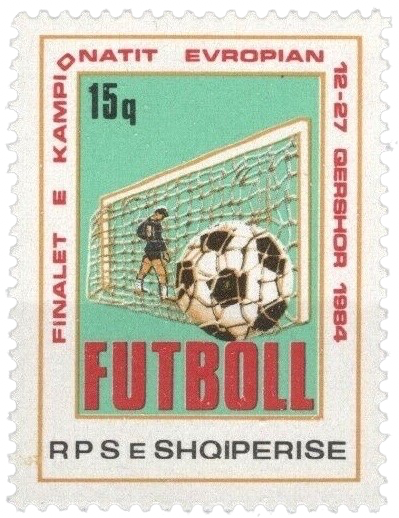
Albanian stamp honouring Euro 1984.

After six years of virtually no international matches, Albania managed to return to international football, participating in the 1982 FIFA World Cup qualification. In Group 1, Albania managed to end above last place, which Finland got instead. They only win came in September 1980 against Finland thanks to the goals of Sefedin Braho and Millan Baçi. In the 1984 European Championship qualifiers, Albania finished in last place in their group of five teams. On the other hand, Albania had some impressive results against bigger teams. They lost 0–1 away to Turkey with the goal being scored in the 86th minute. In the next two games, Albania tied Northern Ireland to a scoreless draw and lost 1–2 to Germany, both at home. In the last three matches, Albania tied Turkey in the Qemal Stafa Stadium and lost 2–1 to Austria in Tirana. The last game of the competition was an away game to Germany. Albania went ahead 0–1 with a goal by Genc Tomorri. However, they were tied one minute later, and after Genc Tomorri was sent off by the referee after a simulation of Rudi Völler, Albania had to play for 60 minutes with one man down. Eventually Albania lost 2–1 with the last goal being scored in the 79th minute.

=== 1986: Near-qualification for the World Cup in Mexico ===
In the 1986 FIFA World Cup qualification Albania faced Belgium, Poland and their rivals Greece. Despite their first loss away from home against Belgium, 3–1, despite an equalizer from Bedri Omuri. Albania could draw against Poland away with 2-2 scoring their first point. After that, Albania famously beat Belgium, at home, 2–0 in the Qemal Stafa Stadium. The goals were scored by Mirel Josa and Arben Minga securing Albania their first and only win in this qualification. It was their most successful qualification attempted during the "Enver Hoxha era" in the FIFA World Cup qualification, finishing third above Greece but behind Belgium and Poland in the process.

=== 1991–99: Transition years ===
Albania managed to get impressive results against Germany during this campaign with Germany winning both matches only by 1-2 and 2–1. At home Hysen Zmijani were able to score an equalizer against the future UEFA Euro 1996 winners. Away in Germany, Albania once more lost close to Germany with a 2–1 defeat. Albania finished the campaign in the 5th place with 2 wins, 2 draws and 6 losses, Albania were able to beat Moldova) twice at home with 3-0 and away with 2–3 in an international qualifying tournament for the first time ever.

In the 1998 World Cup, Albania was drawn in a 6-team group which included Germany, Portugal, Ukraine, Northern Ireland and Armenia, Albania finished last with 4 points, but showed some respective results against the bigger teams. Their two matches with Germany saw them lose 2–3 at neutral ground and 3–4 in Hannover, taking the lead in both games. Albania got a 1–0 win against Northern Ireland and a 1–1 tie against Armenia. Despite those results they finished last in their Group.

In a relatively easy group, Albania only won once at home against Georgia. However, they memorably drew Greece 0–0 at home, Norway 2–2 and Latvia 0–0 (both away). Albania also drew Latvia 3–3 at home. All the other matches were narrowly lost.

=== 2000–05: Slow revolution under Hans Peter Briegel for Albania ===
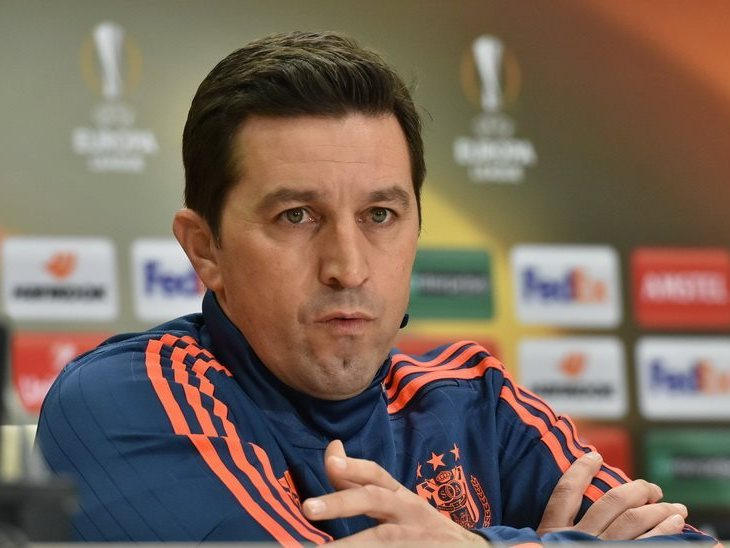
Besnik Hasi (pictured here in 2016), was one of the first Kosovo Albanians to play for the national team. He is considered by Albanian media as the man who "united" Kosovo and Albania.

After a loss to Finland, Albania won over Greece 2–0 with an own goal and a late goal of Ervin Fakaj. However, after that win, another 6 losses followed for Albania, which brought the Albanian Football Federation to think about hiring a foreign coach, 33 years after the last foreign coach, Luznikov, had led Albania in a Moscow tournament in 1959. After that they Appointed than Armando Duka as the new President of the Albanian Football Association. changing so the history of Albania by hiring mostly foreign coaches during his tenure.

After a poor start in which Albania would draw at home against Switzerland with 1–1 by a goal from Edvin Murati but lose in the next match away against Russia with 4-1 despite an earlier equalizer scored by Klodian Duro Albania sacked his manager Giuseppe Dossena to replace him with German Hans-Peter Briegel for the following match against Russia in the Loro Boriçi Stadium in Shkodër. In which the Albanians won deservedly with 3-1 through goals from Altin Rraklli, Altin Lala and Igli Tare to secure Hans-Peter Briegel in his debut match, as a manager his maiden win for Albania. He led Albania to an undefeated run at home matches by drawing against Republic of Ireland 0–0 and beating in the last match Georgia 3–1 by goals from Besnik Hasi, Igli Tare and striker Alban Bushi. Despite the good results, Albania finished the group in the penultimate spot with eight points. Away Albania could not score any points, but managed to score 4 goals. Missing close out to the Playoffs stage by six points.

Two months after Greece beat Portugal to win the European Championship, Albania defeated Greece 2–1 at home by two quick goals from Edvin Murati and Adrian Aliaj, denting the Greeks' possibility to qualify. As the Albanians leading for the table for the first time ever in a qualification after this match. So far Albania's best ever win against their rivals Greece. Albania went on to disappoint by losing to Georgia away and Denmark at home, before returning to winning ways by beating Kazakhstan 0–1 with a goal from Alban Bushi. Then, Albania played Ukraine, Turkey, and Greece, losing all three matches. Later Albania beat Georgia 3–2 by two goals from Igli Tare and one from Ervin Skela as well as beating Kazakhstan with 2–1 by goals from Florian Myrtaj and striker Erjon Bogdani. The last positive result for Albania in this qualification would be a 2–2 away draw with Ukraine where Bogdani scoring two surprising goals. At the end, Albania got 13 points, and four wins, they surpassed for the first time in the history two nation's in the qualifying standings.

=== 2008–12: No improvements under coach Otto Barić, Haan and Kuźe ===
In the matches for the 2008 European qualifiers campaign, Albania have managed very good results as well as good team play in some matches compared to previous times. They started with a 2–2 away draw to Belarus, two wins against Luxembourg home and away (2–0, 3–0) and a 0–0 draw away to Bulgaria. They had two good matches against the Netherlands in both legs, although controversial refereeing caused the matches to end up in two losses (2–1, 0–1). Other setbacks included a 0–0 draw against Slovenia and a 0–2 loss to Romania, both at home. Albania's hopes of qualifying mathematically ended when they failed to win over Slovenia away and managed another 0–0 draw. In the penultimate match at home against Bulgaria drawing 1-1. In the last match at home Albania losing 2–4 against Belarus. Albania's Euro campaign ended with a disastrous 6–1 away loss to Romania, Albania finished 5th above Luxembourg and Slovenia. Do to this Bad result Otto Barić resigned as the coach for Albania together with his assistant.

With Haan as coach Albania started 2010 FIFA World Cup qualification with a 0–0 draw against Sweden at home. Four days later, the Albanians defeated Malta 3–0 with goals from Erjon Bogdani, Armend Dallku and Klodian Duro. On 11 October 2008, Albania lost 2–0 to Hungary in Budapest and then surprisingly drew 0–0 with Portugal in Braga. On 11 February 2009, Albania drew with Malta in Ta'Qali 0–0. Albania then lost 1–0 to Hungary at home on 28 March 2009 and 3–0 to Denmark in Copenhagen on 1 April 2009. In the home match against Portugal, Hugo Almeida scored early for Portugal, before Albania equalised with a goal from Erjon Bogdani. However, with just a few seconds left in the game, Bruno Alves scored the winner for Portugal, eliminating Albania. At the end of the campaign, Albania drew 1–1 against Denmark and lost 4–1 to Sweden. Haan was replaced by Croatian coach Josip Kuže in May 2009.

However, Kuže failed to lead Albania to better results as the team ended the Euro 2012 qualifying with nine points from ten matches. Finishing only above Luxembourg in 5th place. As Albania were only able to win against Luxembourg at home by a goal from Hamdi Salihi, but they were able to draw away against Romania as well as against Bosnia and Herzegovina at home thanks to a free kick goal from Klodian Duro. Another win also came against Belarus with the same score of 1–0 by a goal from Hamdi Salihi once more. They ended their Fortune with an away draw once more to Romania, at home this time. Albania finished their campaign with two wins, three draws and also five defeats as well.

=== 2011–13: The revival under Gianni De Biasi ===
Josip Kuže parted ways with Albania three years and a half after he started the job, and in December 2011, Italian coach Gianni De Biasi replaced him. Albania started the qualifiers well, notably defeating Cyprus with 3–1 by goals from Armando Sadiku, Edgar Çani and Erjon Bogdani as well as beating Slovenia at home with 1–0 by a goal from Odise Roshi. which was followed by an unprecedent away win at Norway in Oslo after a stunning goal from Hamdi Salihi. Albania would also draw against Norway at home despite leading the match with a goal from Valdet Rama, this match ending in a 1–1 draw. The team was at one point 2nd with 6 matches played and 4 to spare, but failed to be successful in the last four, losing away in Slovenia and Iceland, as well at home against Switzerland, and drawing in Cyprus. With De Biasi, the Albania national team reached an unprecedented high number of players, who although are ethnically Albanian, were not born in Albania, but either in Kosovo, or outside of Kosovo, while hailing from Kosovo Albania parents. In 2011–13, 14 Albanians of Kosovo origin were either part of the start-up team, or had received recent call-ups.

=== 2014–16:The Historical UEFA Euro 2016 campaign ===
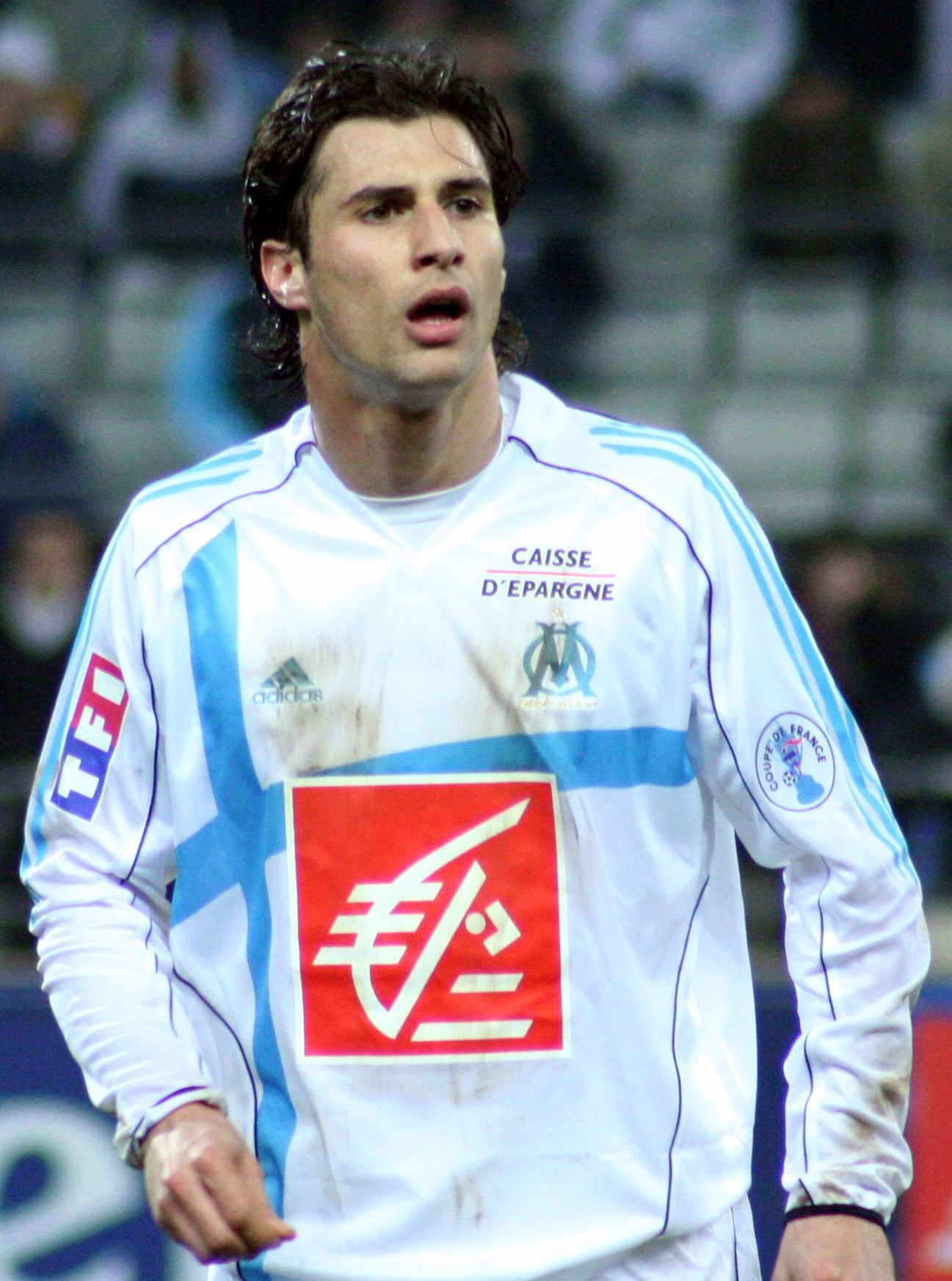
Lorik Cana was the most capped player in the history of the national team with 93 caps; he overtook Altin Lala in 2014 and is seen by many as the symbol of Albanians and the national team.

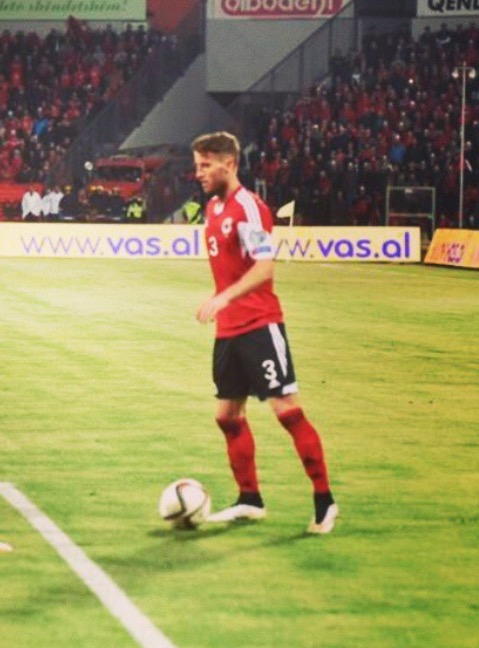
Lenjani with the national team during the UEFA Euro 2016 qualifying match against Armenia at home in which Albania won miracously 1–2 in the end.

The qualifying draw took place on 23 February 2014. Albania was drawn in Group I along with Portugal, Denmark, Serbia, and Armenia. Qualifying matches started in September 2014. Albania started the qualifiers with a historic result as they beat group favourites Portugal 1–0 away thanks to a goal from Bekim Balaj. In the second match against Denmark at the newly renovated Elbasan Arena, Albania was on lead by a goal from Ermir Lenjani until the 82nd minute where Lasse Vibe equalized, with the match ending in a 1–1 draw. In the next game against Serbia at Partizan Stadium, the match was abandoned in 42nd minute after several on and off the field incidents. Despite the violence by Serbia's hooligans against Albania at Partizan Stadium, Serbia was awarded the 3–0 victory after the decision by UEFA. The decision was appealed by both Serbia and Albania, but the decision was upheld by UEFA. Both associations then filed further appeals to the Court of Arbitration for Sport, and on 10 July 2015 the Court of Arbitration for Sport rejected the appeal filed by the Serbian FA, and upholds in part the appeal filed by the Albanian FA, meaning the match is deemed to have been forfeited by Serbia with 0–3 and they are still deducted three points. In the fourth match against Armenia at home, Albania were behind from the 4th minute after an own goal from Mërgim Mavraj, but Mavraj equalized in the 77th minute with a powerful header. Four minutes later Shkëlzen Gashi scored the winner, putting Albania in the 2nd position along with Denmark with 10 points. It was the first time that Albania ended the first part of the qualifiers in the second spot. Albania made history again by beating one-time world champions and UEFA Euro 2016 hosts France at the Elbasan Arena in the "Group I" friendly match to a Freekick goal from Ergys Kaçe. After an unlucky draw against Denmark in Kopenhagen, Albania clinched at least a play-off place. Albania lost their next two matches, conceding goals in the last minute against Portugal 0-1 and against Serbia as well in the derby with 0–2 in the Elbasan Arena. Albania than defeated Armenia 0–3 in Yerevan thanks to an early own goal followed by a header in the 23rd Minute by Berat Djimsiti and a late strike from Armando Sadiku, the Albanians than qualified for the UEFA Euro 2016 its first appearance at a major men's football tournament after 50 years. For this achievement the entire team was bestowed the Honor of Nation Order by Albania's President Bujar Nishani. In addition to the qualification, Albania achieved a world record in terms of not conceding any away goals during the tournament, while scoring seven away goals. Albania made a record itself by winning most of their points away from home with 10 during their campaign, winning three out of four matches away during the process.

==== Standings in Group I ====
Pos	Team	Pld	W	D	L	GF	GA	GD	Pts	Qualification
1	Portugal	8	7	0	1	11	5	+6	21	Qualify for final tournament
2	Albania	8	4	2	2	10	5	+5	14	Qualify for final tournament
3	Denmark	8	3	3	2	8	5	+3	12	Advance to play-offs
4	Serbia (Note: The Serbia v Albania match was awarded as a 3–0 win to Albania, and Serbia were also deducted three points, after the match was abandoned at 0–0 because home fans invaded the pitch and attacked Albania players when a drone carried a pro-Albanian flag over the stadium.)	8	2	1	5	8	13	−5	4	
5	Armenia	8	0	2	6	5	14	−9	2	

Source: UEFA
Rules for classification: Qualification tiebreakers

=== Albania's result in Group I ===
7 September 2014
20:45
(19:45 UTC+1)

Portugal	0–1	Albania
	Report	Balaj 52'

Estádio Municipal, Aveiro
Attendance: 23,205
Referee: Ruddy Buquet (France)

11 October 2014
20:45
(20:45 UTC+2)

Albania	1–1	Denmark
Lenjani 38'	Report	Vibe 81'

Elbasan Arena, Elbasan (Note: Albania played their home matches at Elbasan Arena, Elbasan instead of their regular stadium, Qemal Stafa National Stadium, Tirana, as the national stadium would be reconstructed.)
Attendance: 11,330
Referee: Viktor Kassai (Hungary)

14 October 2014
20:45
(20:45 UTC+2)

Serbia	0–3 Awarded (Note: The Serbia v Albania match was abandoned with the score at 0–0 in the 42nd minute after "various incidents", which resulted in the Albania players refusing to return to the field. UEFA ruled that Albania had forfeited the match and awarded a 3–0 win to Serbia, and deducted three points from Serbia for their involvement in the events. Serbia were ordered next two home qualifying games behind closed doors, and both Serbia and Albania were fined €100,000. The decision was appealed by both Serbia and Albania to UEFA, but the decision was upheld. Both associations then filed further appeals to the Court of Arbitration for Sport, and on 10 July 2015, the Court of Arbitration for Sport rejected the appeal filed by the Serbian FA, and upheld in part the appeal filed by the Albanian FA, meaning the match is deemed to have been forfeited by Serbia with the scoreline of 0–3 and Serbia are deducted three points.)	Albania
	Report

Partizan Stadium, Belgrade
Attendance: 25,200
Referee: Martin Atkinson (England)

29 March 2015
18:00
(18:00 UTC+2)

Albania	2–1	Armenia
Mavraj 77'; Gashi 81'	Report	Mavraj 4' (o.g.)

Elbasan Arena, Elbasan
Attendance: 12,300
Referee: David Fernández Borbalán (Spain)

4 September 2015
20:45
(20:45 UTC+2)

Denmark	0–0	Albania
	Report

Telia Parken, Copenhagen
Attendance: 35,648
Referee: Willie Collum (Scotland)

7 September 2015
20:45
(20:45 UTC+2)

Albania	0–1	Portugal
	Report	Veloso 90+2'

Elbasan Arena, Elbasan
Attendance: 12,121
Referee: Jonas Eriksson (Sweden)

8 October 2015
20:45
(20:45 UTC+2)

Albania	0–2	Serbia
	Report	Kolarov 90+1'; Ljajić 90+4'

Elbasan Arena, Elbasan
Attendance: 12,330
Referee: Nicola Rizzoli (Italy)

11 October 2015
18:00
(20:00 UTC+4)

Armenia	0–3	Albania
	Report	Hovhannisyan 9' (o.g.); Djimsiti 23'; Sadiku 76'

Vazgen Sargsyan Republican Stadium, Yerevan
Attendance: 4,700
Referee: Szymon Marciniak (Poland)

=== Albania's UEFA Euro 2016 team ===
Manager: Gianni De Biasi

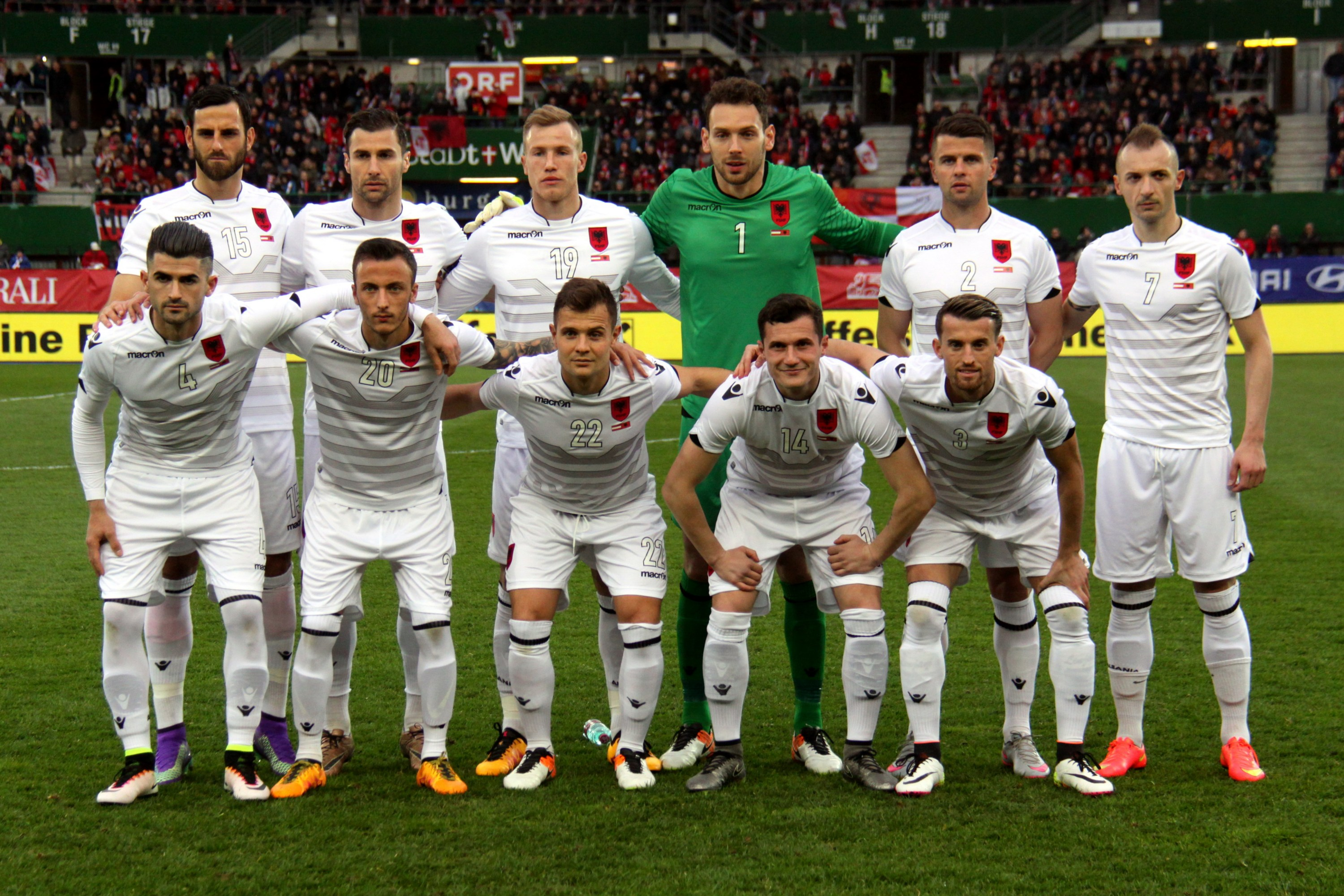
The Albanian National Team during a friendly match against Austria in 2016.

Albania named their final squad on 31 May.

No.	Pos.	Player	Date of birth (age)	Caps	Goals	Club
1	GK	Etrit Berisha	10 March 1989 (aged 27)	35	0	(Italian Football Federation) Lazio
2	DF	Andi Lila	12 February 1986 (aged 30)	58	0	(Hellenic Football Federation) PAS Giannina
3	MF	Ermir Lenjani	5 August 1989 (aged 26)	19	3	(French Football Federation) Nantes
4	DF	Elseid Hysaj	2 February 1994 (aged 22)	20	0	(Italian Football Federation) Napoli
5	DF	Lorik Cana (captain)	27 June 1983 (aged 32)	91	1	(French Football Federation) Nantes
6	DF	Frédéric Veseli	20 November 1992 (aged 23)	3	0	(Swiss Football Association) Lugano
7	DF	Ansi Agolli	11 November 1982 (aged 33)	61	2	(Association of Football Federations of Azerbaijan) Qarabağ
8	MF	Migjen Basha	5 January 1987 (aged 29)	19	3	(Italian Football Federation) Como
9	MF	Ledian Memushaj	7 December 1986 (aged 29)	14	0	(Italian Football Federation) Pescara
10	FW	Armando Sadiku	27 May 1991 (aged 25)	20	5	(Liechtenstein Football Association) Vaduz
11	FW	Shkëlzen Gashi	15 July 1988 (aged 27)	14	1	(United States Soccer Federation) Colorado Rapids
12	GK	Orges Shehi	25 September 1977 (aged 38)	7	0	(Albanian Football Federation) Skënderbeu Korçë
13	MF	Burim Kukeli	16 January 1984 (aged 32)	15	0	(Swiss Football Association) Zürich
14	MF	Taulant Xhaka	28 March 1991 (aged 25)	12	0	(Swiss Football Association) Basel
15	DF	Mërgim Mavraj	9 June 1986 (aged 30)	26	3	(German Football Association) 1. FC Köln
16	FW	Sokol Cikalleshi	27 July 1990 (aged 25)	19	2	(Turkish Football Federation) İstanbul Başakşehir
17	DF	Naser Aliji	27 December 1993 (aged 22)	5	0	(Swiss Football Association) Basel
18	DF	Arlind Ajeti	25 September 1993 (aged 22)	10	1	(Italian Football Federation) Frosinone
19	FW	Bekim Balaj	11 January 1991 (aged 25)	15	1	(Croatian Football Federation) Rijeka
20	MF	Ergys Kaçe	8 July 1993 (aged 22)	16	2	(Hellenic Football Federation) PAOK
21	MF	Odise Roshi	21 May 1991 (aged 25)	32	1	(Croatian Football Federation) Rijeka
22	MF	Amir Abrashi	27 March 1990 (aged 26)	18	0	(German Football Association) SC Freiburg
23	GK	Alban Hoxha	23 November 1987 (aged 28)	1	0	(Albanian Football Federation) Partizani

=== Group A of the UEFA European Championship 2016 in France ===
Albania were drawn in Group A, against the hosts France, Switzerland and Romania. Albania lost their opening Game during their campaign with 1–0 against Switzerland to an early header in the 5th Minute from Fabian Schär despite being one man down after a Red Card for Lorik Cana Albania held its ground as they came close to an equalizer as Shkëlzen Gashi as he missed a sitter in front of goalie Yann Sommer. In the following match they lost 2–0 to the hosts France despite a close fought match being able to defend against the favourites until the last minutes, conceding two goals from Dimitri Payet and Griezmann. While they beat in the third Group match Romania 1–0 by a header scored from Armando Sadiku before halftime, securing Albania's first ever win in a UEFA European Championship. The team finished last among the third-placed teams and were eliminated in the group stage. Finishing their first UEFA European Championship campaign in the 18th place.

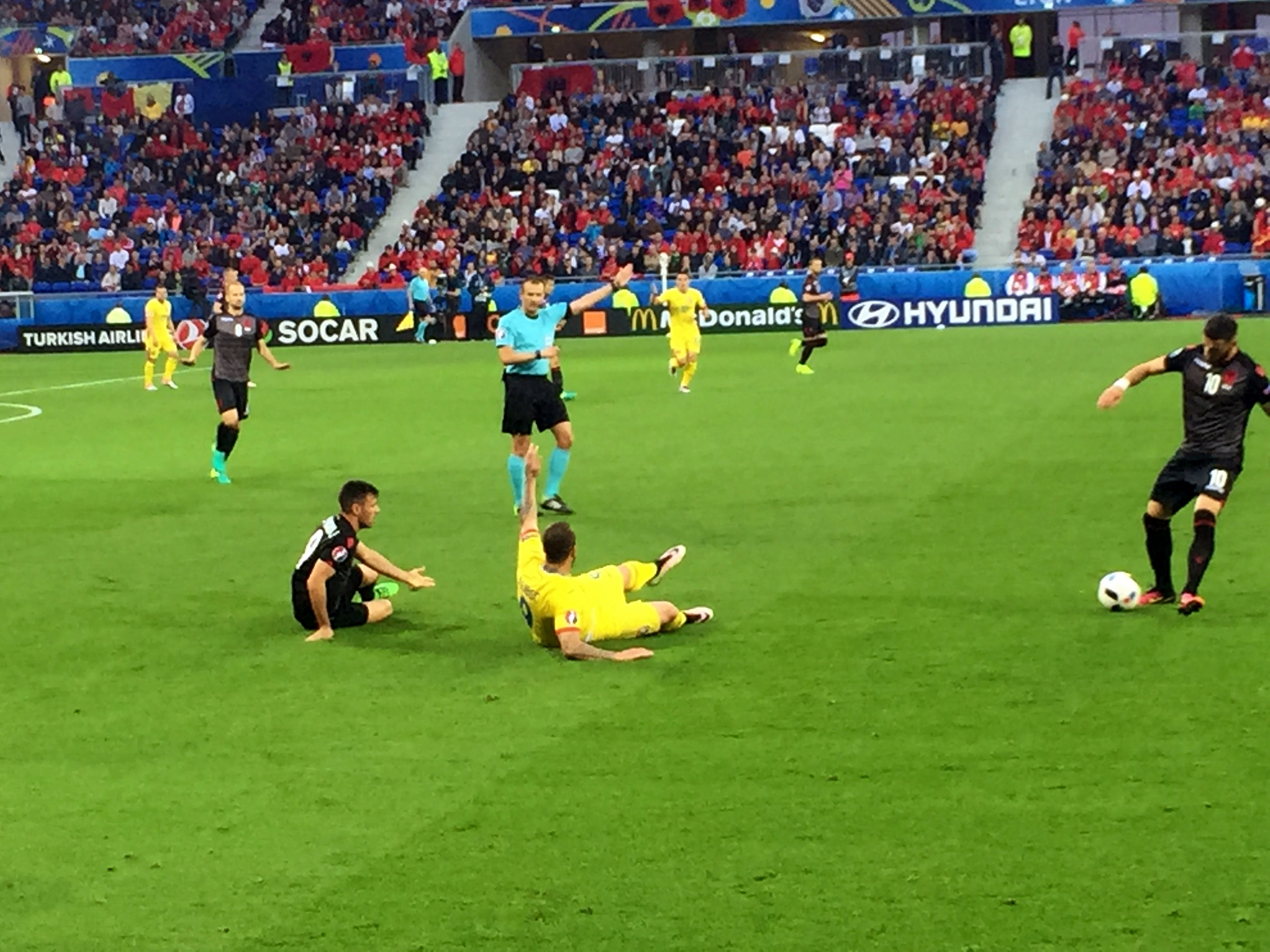
Armando Sadiku (the player with the ball) playing for Albania at the UEFA Euro 2016 he later scored the vital goal for Albania in their 1–0 win in Lyon against Romania.

=== Albania vs Switzerland ===
11 June 2016
15:00

Albania	0–1	Switzerland
	Report	Schär 5'

Stade Bollaert-Delelis, Lens
Attendance: 33,805
Referee: Carlos Velasco Carballo (Spain)

Albania	Switzerland

GK	1	Etrit Berisha
RB	4	Elseid Hysaj
CB	5	Lorik Cana (c)	(yellow card) 23' (yellow-red card) 36'
CB	15	Mërgim Mavraj	(yellow card) 90+2'
LB	7	Ansi Agolli
RM	22	Amir Abrashi
CM	13	Burim Kukeli	(yellow card) 89'
LM	14	Taulant Xhaka		(substituted off) 62'
RW	21	Odise Roshi		(substituted off) 74'
LW	3	Ermir Lenjani
CF	10	Armando Sadiku		(substituted off) 82'
Substitutions:
MF	20	Ergys Kaçe	(yellow card) 63'	(substituted on) 62'
FW	16	Sokol Cikalleshi		(substituted on) 74'
FW	11	Shkëlzen Gashi		(substituted on) 82'
Manager:
(Italy) Gianni De Biasi

GK	1	Yann Sommer
RB	2	Stephan Lichtsteiner (c)
CB	22	Fabian Schär	(yellow card) 14'
CB	20	Johan Djourou
LB	13	Ricardo Rodríguez
CM	11	Valon Behrami	(yellow card) 66'
CM	10	Granit Xhaka
RW	23	Xherdan Shaqiri		(substituted off) 88'
AM	15	Blerim Džemaili		(substituted off) 76'
LW	18	Admir Mehmedi		(substituted off) 62'
CF	9	Haris Seferovic
Substitutions:
FW	7	Breel Embolo		(substituted on) 62'
MF	8	Fabian Frei		(substituted on) 76'
MF	16	Gelson Fernandes		(substituted on) 88'
Manager:
Vladimir Petković

=== France vs Albania ===
15 June 2016
21:00

France	2–0	Albania
Griezmann 90'; Payet 90+6'	Report

Stade Vélodrome, Marseille
Attendance: 63,670
Referee: Willie Collum (Scotland)

France	Albania

GK	1	Hugo Lloris (c)
RB	19	Bacary Sagna
CB	4	Adil Rami
CB	21	Laurent Koscielny
LB	3	Patrice Evra
CM	5	N'Golo Kanté	(yellow card) 88'
CM	14	Blaise Matuidi
RW	20	Kingsley Coman		(substituted off) 68'
AM	8	Dimitri Payet
LW	11	Anthony Martial		(substituted off) 46'
CF	9	Olivier Giroud		(substituted off) 77'
Substitutions:
MF	15	Paul Pogba		(substituted on) 46'
FW	7	Antoine Griezmann		(substituted on) 68'
FW	10	André-Pierre Gignac		(substituted on) 77'
Manager:
Didier Deschamps

GK	1	Etrit Berisha
RB	4	Elseid Hysaj
CB	18	Arlind Ajeti		(substituted off) 85'
CB	15	Mërgim Mavraj
LB	7	Ansi Agolli (c)
DM	13	Burim Kukeli	(yellow card) 55'	(substituted off) 74'
CM	22	Amir Abrashi	(yellow card) 81'
CM	9	Ledian Memushaj
RW	2	Andi Lila		(substituted off) 71'
LW	3	Ermir Lenjani
CF	10	Armando Sadiku
Substitutions:
MF	21	Odise Roshi		(substituted on) 71'
MF	14	Taulant Xhaka		(substituted on) 74'
DF	6	Frédéric Veseli		(substituted on) 85'
Manager:
(Italy) Gianni De Biasi

=== Romania vs Albania ===
19 June 2016
21:00

Romania	0–1	Albania
	Report	Sadiku 43'

Parc Olympique Lyonnais, Décines-Charpieu
Attendance: 49,752
Referee: Pavel Královec (Czech Republic)

Romania	Albania

GK	12	Ciprian Tătărușanu
RB	22	Cristian Săpunaru	(yellow card) 85'
CB	21	Dragoș Grigore
CB	6	Vlad Chiricheș (c)
LB	2	Alexandru Mățel	(yellow card) 54'
CM	18	Andrei Prepeliță		(substituted off) 46'
CM	5	Ovidiu Hoban
RW	20	Adrian Popa		(substituted off) 68'
AM	10	Nicolae Stanciu
LW	19	Bogdan Stancu
CF	9	Denis Alibec		(substituted off) 57'
Substitutions:
MF	17	Lucian Sânmărtean		(substituted on) 46'
MF	11	Gabriel Torje	(yellow card) 90+3'	(substituted on) 57'
FW	14	Florin Andone		(substituted on) 68'
Manager:
Anghel Iordănescu

GK	1	Etrit Berisha
RB	4	Elseid Hysaj	(yellow card) 90+4'
CB	18	Arlind Ajeti
CB	15	Mërgim Mavraj
LB	7	Ansi Agolli (c)
DM	8	Migjen Basha	(yellow card) 6'	(substituted off) 83'
CM	22	Amir Abrashi
CM	9	Ledian Memushaj	(yellow card) 85'
RW	2	Andi Lila
LW	3	Ermir Lenjani		(substituted off) 77'
CF	10	Armando Sadiku		(substituted off) 59'
Substitutions:
FW	19	Bekim Balaj		(substituted on) 59'
MF	21	Odise Roshi		(substituted on) 77'
DF	5	Lorik Cana		(substituted on) 83'
Manager:
(Italy) Gianni De Biasi

Man of the Match:
Arlind Ajeti (Albania)

=== Standings in Group A ===
Pos	Team	Pld	W	D	L	GF	GA	GD	Pts	Qualification
1	France (H)	3	2	1	0	4	1	+3	7	Advance to knockout stage
2	Switzerland	3	1	2	0	2	1	+1	5	Advance to knockout stage
3	Albania	3	1	0	2	1	3	−2	3	
4	Romania	3	0	1	2	2	4	−2	1	

Source: UEFA
Rules for classification: Group stage tiebreakers
(H) Hosts

=== 2016–2020: Ups and downs after the UEFA European Championship ===
Despite the UEFA European Championship's almost successful debut, Albania suffered massive setback. In 2018 World Cup qualification, Albania had been thrown into a tough group composing Spain and Italy. Albania, despite its passionate play, failed to reach the World Cup, falling to both Italy and Spain as well as a shocking 0–3 loss to Israel at home. During this era, their successful manager, Gianni De Biasi, resigned and Christian Panucci, another Italian, replaced him as coach of Albania. The situation however did not improve significantly. Albania played poorly in the 2018–19 UEFA Nations League, winning only to Israel 1–0 and lost the remaining three, especially the devastating 0–4 defeat to Scotland at home.

Panucci would be sacked after a 0–2 defeat to Turkey in the opening campaign for the UEFA Euro 2020 qualifying. Another Italian, Edoardo Reja, was appointed to help Albania to improve in a tough group, but improvement is still very little. The Albanian side continued to slump, suffering a 0–1 loss away to Iceland before managed to gain its second win against Moldova 2–0. Reja would lead Albania in their encounter against world champions France in Paris, where the Albanians suffered a 1–4 loss, the match was also marred with controversy after Andorran anthem was mistakenly played instead of Albanian one. Albania managed one of its biggest feat in their qualification, beating 2018 World Cup participant Iceland 4–2 at home soil to keep the team on track. Despite this outcome, Albanians, despite its passionate display, lost 0–1 in final minutes because of defensive mistake, thus losing every chance to qualify for the UEFA Euro 2020. In the next match, Albania won comfortably 4–0 versus Moldova at Zimbru Stadium, though it was not enough to prevent Albania from elimination.

==== Standings of Group H ====
Pos	Team	Pld	W	D	L	GF	GA	GD	Pts	Qualification	(France)	(Turkey)	(Iceland)	(Albania)	(Andorra)	(Moldova)
1	France	10	8	1	1	25	6	+19	25	Qualify for final tournament	—	1–1	4–0	4–1	3–0	2–1
2	Turkey	10	7	2	1	18	3	+15	23	Qualify for final tournament	2–0	—	0–0	1–0	1–0	4–0
3	Iceland	10	6	1	3	14	11	+3	19	Advance to play-offs via Nations League	0–1	2–1	—	1–0	2–0	3–0
4	Albania	10	4	1	5	16	14	+2	13		0–2	0–2	4–2	—	2–2	2–0
5	Andorra	10	1	1	8	3	20	−17	4		0–4	0–2	0–2	0–3	—	1–0
6	Moldova	10	1	0	9	4	26	−22	3		1–4	0–4	1–2	0–4	1–0	—

Source: UEFA
Rules for classification: Qualification tiebreakers

=== 2021-2024 close miss for Qatar 2022 to qualification at the UEFA Euro's 2024 ===
Albania faced in the 2022 FIFA World Cup qualification – UEFA Group I for Katar, they faced England, Poland, Hungary, Andorra and San Marino. Notably beat twice in fact with the same score. Albania finished third in the Group with a record of six wins and 18 points along the way in the standings finishing third for the second time running during the qualifications.

Albania and Edoardo Reja would go their separate ways after a shocking display for Albania in the 2022–23 UEFA Nations League Group 2 in Division B. In which the Albanians were performing badly especially against Israel losing at home 1-2 and away with the same score. Securing only two points in total both against Iceland 1-1 and 1–1 away as well. Still Albania secured another year in the same Division B after Russia being excluded from Group 2.

In the UEFA Euro 2024 qualifying Group E Albania were drawn together with Czech Republic, Poland, Faroe Islands and Moldova. In which the new coach Sylvinho gave his debut for the Country. Albania lost his first match against Poland away close with 1-0 despite playing well. In the following matches Albania would not lose any of them. Beating Moldova at home 2–0 with Jasir Asani scoring the goal of the matchday for his side. Followed by a win against the Faroe Islands 1–3 away in which Kristjan Asllani scored a beautiful UEFA match day winning goal for the second time running for Albania in their campaign. After a hard earned 1–1 draw in Prague against the Czech Republic with a screamer goal from Nedim Bajrami. Albania were able to beat Poland in the Arena Kombëtare with 2-0 and another Jasir Asani mega goal. For the third time Albania scored the most beautiful goal of the matchday. They would also beat the Czech Republic with a dominant 3-0 display. Albania would secure the Qualification for the second time in the History for the UEFA European Championship at the UEFA Euro 2024 in Germany, after drawing to Moldova 1-1 despite leading most of the match. Although drawing once more against the Faroe Islands Albania would finish the qualifications in the first place with 15 Points for the first time ever in their history. Being also eight matches unbeaten during that period. They secured the second pot for the UEFA Group stage draws after ranking 10th in the power rankings, do to their great performance.

==== Standings in Group E ====
Pos	Team	Pld	W	D	L	GF	GA	GD	Pts	Qualification
1	Albania	8	4	3	1	12	4	+8	15 (Note: Head to head points: Albania 4, Czech Republic 1.)	Qualify for final tournament
2	Czech Republic	8	4	3	1	12	6	+6	15	Qualify for final tournament
3	Poland	8	3	2	3	10	10	0	11	Advance to play-offs via Nations League
4	Moldova	8	2	4	2	7	10	−3	10	
5	Faroe Islands	8	0	2	6	2	13	−11	2	

Source: UEFA
Rules for classification: Qualification tiebreakers

=== Result's for Albania in Group E ===
27 March 2023
20:45

Poland	1–0	Albania
Świderski 41'	Report

Stadion Narodowy, Warsaw
Attendance: 56,227
Referee: Slavko Vinčić (Slovenia)

17 June 2023
20:45

Albania	2–0	Moldova
Asani 52'; Bajrami 76'	Report

Arena Kombëtare, Tirana
Attendance: 20,944
Referee: Dennis Higler (Netherlands)

20 June 2023
20:45 (19:45 UTC+1)

Faroe Islands	1–3	Albania
Færø 45+1'	Report	Bajrami 20'; Asllani 51'; Muçi 90+1'

Tórsvøllur, Tórshavn
Attendance: 2,507
Referee: Chrysovalantis Theouli (Cyprus)

7 September 2023
20:45

Czech Republic	1–1	Albania
Černý 56'	Report	Bajrami 66'

Eden Arena, Prague
Attendance: 18,641
Referee: Anthony Taylor (England)

10 September 2023
20:45

Albania	2–0	Poland
Asani 37'; Daku 62'	Report

Arena Kombëtare, Tirana
Attendance: 21,900
Referee: José María Sánchez Martínez (Spain)

12 October 2023
20:45

Albania	3–0	Czech Republic
Asani 9'; Seferi 51', 73'	Report

Arena Kombëtare, Tirana
Attendance: 20,917
Referee: Danny Makkelie (Netherlands)

17 November 2023
18:00 (19:00 UTC+2)

Moldova	1–1	Albania
Baboglo 87'	Report	Cikalleshi 25' (pen.)

Stadionul Zimbru, Chișinău
Attendance: 9,537
Referee: Willie Collum (Scotland)

20 November 2023
20:45

Albania	0–0	Faroe Islands
	Report

Arena Kombëtare, Tirana
Attendance: 21,456
Referee: Sven Jablonski (Germany)

=== Albania's UEFA Euro 2024 Team ===
Manager: (Brazil) Sylvinho

Albania announced a squad of 27 players on 27 May 2024. The final 26-man squad was officially announced on 8 June, with goalkeeper Simon Simoni being left out.

No.	Pos.	Player	Date of birth (age)	Caps	Goals	Club
1	GK	Etrit Berisha	10 March 1989 (aged 35)	81	0	(Italian Football Federation) Empoli
2	DF	Iván Balliu	1 January 1992 (aged 32)	13	0	(Royal Spanish Football Federation) Rayo Vallecano
3	DF	Mario Mitaj	6 August 2003 (aged 20)	14	0	(Russian Football Union) Lokomotiv Moscow
4	DF	Elseid Hysaj	2 February 1994 (aged 30)	84	2	(Italian Football Federation) Lazio
5	DF	Arlind Ajeti	25 September 1993 (aged 30)	26	1	(Romanian Football Federation) CFR Cluj
6	DF	Berat Djimsiti (captain)	19 February 1993 (aged 31)	58	1	(Italian Football Federation) Atalanta
7	FW	Rey Manaj	24 February 1997 (aged 27)	34	8	(Turkish Football Federation) Sivasspor
8	MF	Klaus Gjasula	14 December 1989 (aged 34)	28	0	(German Football Association) Darmstadt 98
9	FW	Jasir Asani	19 May 1995 (aged 29)	13	4	(Korea Football Association) Gwangju
10	MF	Nedim Bajrami	28 February 1999 (aged 25)	23	4	(Italian Football Federation) Sassuolo
11	FW	Armando Broja	10 September 2001 (aged 22)	21	5	(The Football Association) Fulham
12	GK	Elhan Kastrati	2 February 1997 (aged 27)	2	0	(Italian Football Federation) Cittadella
13	DF	Enea Mihaj	5 July 1998 (aged 25)	19	0	(Portuguese Football Federation) Famalicão
14	MF	Qazim Laçi	19 January 1996 (aged 28)	27	3	(Football Association of the Czech Republic) Sparta Prague
15	FW	Taulant Seferi	15 November 1996 (aged 27)	19	3	(United Arab Emirates Football Association) Baniyas
16	MF	Medon Berisha	21 October 2003 (aged 20)	1	0	(Italian Football Federation) Lecce
17	FW	Ernest Muçi	19 March 2001 (aged 23)	10	3	(Turkish Football Federation) Beşiktaş
18	DF	Ardian Ismajli	30 September 1996 (aged 27)	38	2	(Italian Football Federation) Empoli
19	FW	Mirlind Daku	1 January 1998 (aged 26)	5	1	(Russian Football Union) Rubin Kazan
20	MF	Ylber Ramadani	12 April 1996 (aged 28)	35	1	(Italian Football Federation) Lecce
21	MF	Kristjan Asllani	9 March 2002 (aged 22)	20	2	(Italian Football Federation) Inter Milan
22	MF	Amir Abrashi	27 March 1990 (aged 34)	50	1	(Swiss Football Association) Grasshoppers
23	GK	Thomas Strakosha	19 March 1995 (aged 29)	28	0	(The Football Association) Brentford
24	DF	Marash Kumbulla	8 February 2000 (aged 24)	19	0	(Italian Football Federation) Sassuolo
25	DF	Naser Aliji	27 December 1993 (aged 30)	14	0	(Romanian Football Federation) Voluntari
26	FW	Arbër Hoxha	6 October 1998 (aged 25)	4	0	(Croatian Football Federation) Dinamo Zagreb

=== Albaniaʼs UEFA Euro's 2024 campaign ===
On 17 November 2023, Albania qualified for UEFA Euro 2024, their second major tournament. They were drawn in Group B, which is considered the group of death by many fans, containing then three-time Euro winners Spain, two-time Euro winners and defending champions Italy, as well as Croatia, which came third in the 2022 FIFA World Cup. In their first match they faced defending Champions Italy in Dortmund. Albania would start great to this game as Nedim Bajrami would score after just 24 seconds, with a vital strike, after a misleading three throw from Dimarco. Marking a record by scoring the fastest goal ever at the UEFA Euro Championships. But the Albanians could not hold on their result as Italy struck back with two fast goals from Alessandro Bastoni and Nicolò Barella. Albania was not able to turn the result around and would eventually lose this match close with 2-1 at the end. In their next match they faced Croatia in Hamburg. In a tight match Albania were leading by a goal from Qazim Laçi despite the lead they had other chances to go ahead but could not score so at half time they finished with the same result. After the break, they conceded two quick goals in the 76th and 78th minutes with one goal being from Andrej Kramarić and the other one being an own goal caused by Klaus Gjasula. Despite being down Albania fought hard to the end, to earn its well deserved draw after an important goal by Gjasula right at the end of the match. The Albanians secured an important draw and their first point, during this Group. Albania achieved their second UEFA Euro record as Klaus Gjasula achieved it as a substitute player to score a goal and an own goal during his match. In their third and last match they faced Spain in the Merkur Spiel-Arena in Düsseldorf. The circumstances were tough for Albania as they needed a win to secure a qualification for the Round of sixteen. Spain despite putting some players to rest would lead the charge and scored the goal in the 13th minute by Ferran Torres. Albania needing some more than forty to get along at this match as their only chance came by Kristjan Asllani in which his powerful shot was saved by Raya right before half time. After the break Albania were trying more offensively as they had their best phase during the 60th minute. In which Armando Broja had the best chance for his country, as Albania got a free kick in which Asllani chipped the ball right to his foot but he couldn't convert his chance as David Raya saved his chip ball. In the 69th minute Jasir Asani tried it with a long distance shot but his shot was an easy catch for the goalie. Despite that the Albanians were targetting the Spaniards more frequently, as Asllani got a good chance at the 77th minute but his shot missed the goal just slightly. Albania came the equalizer near especially in the 90+1 minute during the extra time in which Broja could not put the ball past the next as he could not find the right angle between his teammates, despite all efforts Albania would lose this match by 0-1 at the end, that would also finish their UEFA Euro hopes unfortunately. Albania proved the doubters wrong as Albania displayed a great performance despite being the underdog at the Group of death showcasing their potential as a football nation, for the future. They finished last in their Group with one point losing their two competitive matches by just one goal each against Italy and Spain during the process and with one draw as well. They finished their UEFA Euro 2024 journey in the 24th place.

=== Italy vs Albania ===
Nedim Bajrami scored for Albania after 23 seconds, netting the fastest goal in the UEFA European Championship history.

15 June 2024
21:00

Italy	2–1	Albania
Bastoni 11'; Barella 16'	Report	Bajrami 1'

Westfalenstadion, Dortmund
Attendance: 60,512
Referee: Felix Zwayer (Germany)

Italy	Albania

GK	1	Gianluigi Donnarumma (c)
RB	2	Giovanni Di Lorenzo
CB	23	Alessandro Bastoni
CB	5	Riccardo Calafiori	(yellow card) 51'
LB	3	Federico Dimarco		(substituted off) 83'
CM	8	Jorginho
CM	18	Nicolò Barella		(substituted off) 90+2'
RW	7	Davide Frattesi
AM	10	Lorenzo Pellegrini	(yellow card) 21'	(substituted off) 77'
LW	14	Federico Chiesa		(substituted off) 77'
CF	9	Gianluca Scamacca		(substituted off) 83'
Substitutions:
MF	16	Bryan Cristante		(substituted on) 77'
DF	24	Andrea Cambiaso		(substituted on) 77'
FW	19	Mateo Retegui		(substituted on) 83'
DF	13	Matteo Darmian		(substituted on) 83'
FW	25	Michael Folorunsho		(substituted on) 90+2'
Manager:
Luciano Spalletti

GK	23	Thomas Strakosha
RB	4	Elseid Hysaj
CB	6	Berat Djimsiti (c)
CB	5	Arlind Ajeti
LB	3	Mario Mitaj
CM	21	Kristjan Asllani
CM	20	Ylber Ramadani
CM	10	Nedim Bajrami		(substituted off) 87'
RF	9	Jasir Asani		(substituted off) 68'
CF	11	Armando Broja	(yellow card) 51'	(substituted off) 77'
LF	15	Taulant Seferi		(substituted off) 68'
Substitutions:
FW	26	Arbër Hoxha	(yellow card) 74'	(substituted on) 68'
MF	14	Qazim Laçi		(substituted on) 68'
FW	7	Rey Manaj		(substituted on) 77'
FW	17	Ernest Muçi		(substituted on) 87'
Manager:
(Brazil) Sylvinho

=== Croatia vs Albania ===
19 June 2024
15:00

Croatia	2–2	Albania
Kramarić 74'; Gjasula 76' (o.g.)	Report	Laçi 11'; Gjasula 90+5'

Volksparkstadion, Hamburg
Attendance: 46,784
Referee: François Letexier (France)

Croatia	Albania

GK	1	Dominik Livaković
RB	22	Josip Juranović
CB	6	Josip Šutalo
CB	4	Joško Gvardiol
LB	14	Ivan Perišić		(substituted off) 84'
CM	10	Luka Modrić (c)
CM	11	Marcelo Brozović		(substituted off) 46'
CM	8	Mateo Kovačić
RF	7	Lovro Majer		(substituted off) 46'
CF	17	Bruno Petković		(substituted off) 69'
LF	9	Andrej Kramarić		(substituted off) 84'
Substitutions:
MF	25	Luka Sučić		(substituted on) 46'
MF	15	Mario Pašalić		(substituted on) 46'
FW	16	Ante Budimir		(substituted on) 69'
DF	19	Borna Sosa		(substituted on) 84'
MF	26	Martin Baturina		(substituted on) 84'
Other disciplinary actions:
TS	—	Vedran Ćorluka	(yellow card) 65'
GK	23	Ivica Ivušić	(yellow card) 87'
Manager:
Zlatko Dalić

GK	23	Thomas Strakosha
RB	4	Elseid Hysaj	(yellow card) 77'
CB	6	Berat Djimsiti (c)
CB	5	Arlind Ajeti
LB	3	Mario Mitaj
CM	21	Kristjan Asllani
CM	20	Ylber Ramadani		(substituted off) 85'
CM	14	Qazim Laçi		(substituted off) 72'
RF	9	Jasir Asani		(substituted off) 64'
CF	7	Rey Manaj		(substituted off) 85'
LF	10	Nedim Bajrami
Substitutions:
FW	15	Taulant Seferi		(substituted on) 64'
MF	8	Klaus Gjasula	(yellow card) 90+7'	(substituted on) 72'
FW	26	Arbër Hoxha		(substituted on) 85'
FW	19	Mirlind Daku	(yellow card) 90+3'	(substituted on) 85'
Manager:
(Brazil) Sylvinho

=== Albania vs Spain ===
24 June 2024
21:00

Albania	0–1	Spain
	Report	Torres 13'

Merkur Spiel-Arena, Düsseldorf
Attendance: 46,586
Referee: Glenn Nyberg (Sweden)

Albania	Spain

GK	23	Thomas Strakosha
RB	2	Iván Balliu
CB	6	Berat Djimsiti (c)
CB	5	Arlind Ajeti
LB	3	Mario Mitaj
CM	20	Ylber Ramadani
CM	21	Kristjan Asllani
RW	9	Jasir Asani		(substituted off) 82'
AM	14	Qazim Laçi		(substituted off) 71'
LW	10	Nedim Bajrami	(yellow card) 66'	(substituted off) 71'
CF	7	Rey Manaj		(substituted off) 58'
Substitutions:
FW	11	Armando Broja		(substituted on) 58'
FW	16	Medon Berisha	(yellow card) 89'	(substituted on) 71'
FW	26	Arbër Hoxha		(substituted on) 71'
FW	17	Ernest Muçi		(substituted on) 82'
Other disciplinary actions:
TS	—	Ervin Bulku (Note: While sources initially indicated that Albania manager Sylvinho was shown a yellow card, replays indicated that the card was instead given to his assistant manager Ervin Bulku.)	(yellow card) 52'
Manager:
(Brazil) Sylvinho

GK	1	David Raya
RB	22	Jesús Navas (c)
CB	5	Daniel Vivian	(yellow card) 90'
CB	14	Aymeric Laporte		(substituted off) 46'
LB	12	Álex Grimaldo
CM	18	Martín Zubimendi
CM	6	Mikel Merino
RW	11	Ferran Torres		(substituted off) 71'
AM	10	Dani Olmo		(substituted off) 84'
LW	21	Mikel Oyarzabal		(substituted off) 62'
CF	9	Joselu		(substituted off) 71'
Substitutions:
DF	3	Robin Le Normand		(substituted on) 46'
FW	25	Fermín López		(substituted on) 62'
FW	19	Lamine Yamal		(substituted on) 71'
FW	7	Álvaro Morata		(substituted on) 71'
MF	15	Álex Baena		(substituted on) 84'
Manager:
Luis de la Fuente

=== Standings in Group B ===
Pos	Team	Pld	W	D	L	GF	GA	GD	Pts	Qualification
1	Spain	3	3	0	0	5	0	+5	9	Advance to knockout stage
2	Italy	3	1	1	1	3	3	0	4	Advance to knockout stage
3	Croatia	3	0	2	1	3	6	−3	2	
4	Albania	3	0	1	2	3	5	−2	1	

Source: UEFA
Rules for classification: Group stage tiebreakers

=== Albania securing the playoffs during the FIFA World Cup 2026 qualification ===
Albania were drawn into Group K of 2026 FIFA World Cup qualification, with England, Serbia, Latvia and Andorra. Many fans were shocked to see Albania and Serbia put in the same group due to past incidents in the UEFA Euro 2016 qualifying.

Others questioned if another incident would occur during those qualification matches. In their first match, they faced England in the Wembley Stadium in London. Despite a good performance, they lost the match 2-0 by goals from Myles Lewis-Skelly and Harry Kane in the process. In the following match, Albania faced Andorra in the Arena Kombëtare where they were able to secure also its highest win at the qualification beating them 3-0 by two goals from Rey Manaj in the 9th and 19th minute and by one goal from Myrto Uzuni at the end of the match to secure Albania its first win during their qualifications campaign.

In the following match, they faced Serbia at home in the derby at the Air Albania Stadium. Despite an impressive defensive performance, Albania was not able to create many chances apart from counter attacks were Armando Broja could not find Arbër Hoxha as his pass was cleared by the Serbian defender, right before scoring. The main highlight came for Albania in the 45th minute where Albania was getting a penalty, but despite the opportunity, Manaj missed the chance to score as his pen was saved by the Serbian Goalkeeper. Nothing happened in the second half, so this match ended in a peaceful 0-0 draw. At the following match against Latvia in Riga, Albania would show its worst performance in this group as they would secure only a 1-1 draw without even scoring as a team as their only goal came by Antonijs Černomordijs who scored an own goal for Albania and would later go on to score the equalizer for his country.

Despite the challenging situation, Albania faced after this match, they were able to win their next three matches in a row. Starting with their first win against Latvia at home, where Kristjan Asllani scored the vital penalty to secure an important 1-0 final result.

Their next opponent was Serbia. Due to safety concerns, that match was played in the Dubočica Stadium instead in Belgrade. At the start of the match, Albania had to find its rhythm, as Serbia had a chance with Mitrovic during the start of the match. Despite that, Albania found its way through and was able to score with Rey Manaj in the 45+1 minute before half time. He celebrated this goal with a double-headed eagle celebration that gave him a yellow card. Albania also had a chance with Nedim Bajrami in the 90+2 minute to score the second goal of this match, but Petrovic would save his shot at the process. Despite that, Albania would secure its third and most vital win during this qualification circle. As this win puts them four points ahead of Serbia.

In their next match they faced, Andorra, at the Estadi de la FAF for the decider. Things would be tougher as Andorra did defend pretty well during this match, chances were rare. But the Albanians kept insisting and would score the vital goal in the 67th minute in which Kristjan Asllani scored the sole goal during this match, after a well executed counter attack. Albania would win this match, whilst also Serbia lost their match in hand against England, to secure Albania a playoff spot after this important win, their fourth win, and their third consecutive win, without conceding any goals during this qualification. It marks their fifth win in a row as a national footbal team, a feat they achieved for the first in their football history as a nation.

In their last match, they faced England at home. Despite the chances Albania had especially at the start of the second half, in which Arbër Hoxha had his best chances in the game, in the 49th Minute his shot was saved superbly by Jordan Pickford. One minute later he got a well served pass by Nedim Bajrami, but he couldn't convert it as his, shoot got right to the hands of the goalie. Despite all that it was England, who would secure this win after two goals scored by Harry Kane in the 73rd and 82nd minute of the game, securing them their 8th win in their entire qualifications, whilst Albania would lose for the second time during the qualifications. Albania would finish this Group in second place with 14 Points (four wins, two draws and two losses), securing them the playoffs for the first time ever during the FIFA World Cup qualifiers. It was Albania's best ever qualification as well as they finished second during a qualification, for the first time during the history, as a football nation.

==== Standings in Group K ====
Pos	Team	Pld	W	D	L	GF	GA	GD	Pts	Qualification
1	England	8	8	0	0	22	0	+22	24	Qualification for 2026 FIFA World Cup
2	Albania	8	4	2	2	7	5	+2	14	Advance to play-offs
3	Serbia	8	4	1	3	9	10	−1	13	
4	Latvia	8	1	2	5	5	15	−10	5	
5	Andorra	8	0	1	7	3	16	−13	1	

Source: FIFA, UEFA
Rules for classification: Tiebreakers

=== Albania's result's in Group K ===
21 March 2025
20:45 (19:45 UTC+0)

England	2–0	Albania
Lewis-Skelly 20'; Kane 77'	Report (FIFA); Report (UEFA)

Wembley Stadium, London
Attendance: 82,378
Referee: Alejandro Hernández Hernández (Spain)

24 March 2025
20:45

Albania	3–0	Andorra
Manaj 9', 19'; Uzuni 90+2'	Report (FIFA); Report (UEFA)

Arena Kombëtare, Tirana
Attendance: 17,183
Referee: Sebastian Gishamer (Austria)

7 June 2025
20:45

Albania	0–0	Serbia
	Report (FIFA); Report (UEFA)

Arena Kombëtare, Tirana
Attendance: 20,427
Referee: Davide Massa (Italy)

10 June 2025
20:45 (21:45 UTC+3)

Latvia	1–1	Albania
Černomordijs 45+4'	Report (FIFA); Report (UEFA)	Černomordijs 29' (o.g.)

Skonto Stadium, Riga
Attendance: 6,083
Referee: Halil Umut Meler (Turkey)

9 September 2025
20:45

Albania	1–0	Latvia
Asllani 25' (pen.)	Report (FIFA); Report (UEFA)

Arena Kombëtare, Tirana
Attendance: 16,568
Referee: Damian Sylwestrzak (Poland)

11 October 2025
20:45

Serbia	0–1	Albania
	Report (FIFA); Report (UEFA)	Manaj 45+1'

Dubočica Stadium, Leskovac
Attendance: 4,320
Referee: István Kovács (Romania)

13 November 2025
20:45

Andorra	0–1	Albania
	Report (FIFA); Report (UEFA)	Asllani 67'

Estadi de la FAF, Encamp
Attendance: 2,225
Referee: Horațiu Feșnic (Romania)

16 November 2025
18:00

Albania	0–2	England
	Report (FIFA); Report (UEFA)	Kane 74', 82'

Arena Kombëtare, Tirana
Attendance: 21,459
Referee: Marco Guida (Italy)

== Honours ==
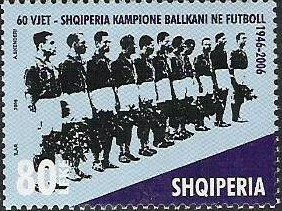
Stamps of Albania, 2007. 60th Anniversary of Victory at the Balkan Cup

Major

- UEFA European Championship:
  - Group stage (2): UEFA Euro 2016 in France, UEFA Euro 2024 in Germany.
  - Round of 16 (1): 1964 European Nations' Cup qualification for Spain.
- UEFA Nations League:
  - Promotion (1): 2020–21 UEFA Nations League C

Regional

- Balkan Cup

- Winner (1): 1946
- Fifth place (2): 1947, 1948

Minor

- Malta (Rothmans) International Tournament

- Winner (1): 2000
- Third place (1): 1998

== History in youth football ==
=== 1972 UEFA European Under-23 Championship ===
The Albanian Under-23 did participate in many Competitions during their past. They made their competitive debut during the 1972 UEFA European Under-23 Championship. Facing in the Group 8:West Germany, Poland and Turkey. In a relatively tough Group, Albania were able to secure their first points ever during a qualification match against Poland at home with 1-1 followed by a surprising draw away against Turkey. Despite losing their next three matches against Poland away 2-1 and against West Germany 0-2 and 2–0 away, the Albanians were able to draw once more at home against Turkey. This time without a score. Albania would finish the group in 3rd place with three points and above Turkey thanks to the goal difference.

==== Qualifying Group 8 standings ====
		P	W	D	L	F	A	Pts
1	West Germany	6	5	1	0	11	1	11
2	Poland	6	2	3	1	7	4	7
3	Albania	6	0	3	3	2	7	3
4	Turkey	6	0	3	3	0	8	3

- Albania 1–1 Poland
- Turkey 0–0 Albania
- Albania 0–2 West Germany
- Poland 2–1 Albania
- West Germany 2–0 Albania
- Albania 0–0 Turkey

=== 1974 UEFA European Under-23 Championship ===
In the Following Championship, Albania faced in Group 4: East Germany and Romania. The Albanians started the campaign, pretty well as they were able to draw their first match against Romania at home 1-1 followed by a surprising first win against the East Germans at home with 1-0 what would be Albania's first ever win in the UEFA European youth Championship. But the hopes for qualification were dashed as they lost away from home against Romania 1-2 and against the eventually runners up in the Tournament East Germany with 0-6 despite that, Albania showed some good Performance during that period. Despite finishing last in the Group.

==== Qualifying Group 4 standings ====
		P	W	D	L	F	A	Pts
1	East Germany	4	3	0	1	10	3	6
2	Romania	4	1	1	2	5	6	3
3	Albania	4	1	1	2	3	9	3

- Albania 1–1 Romania
- Albania 1-0 East Germany
- Romania 2–1 Albania
- East Germany 6–0 Albania

=== UEFA European Under-23 championship record ===
UEFA European Under-23 championship record
Year	Round	GP	W	D	L	GS	GA
1972	Qualifying Stage	6	0	3	3	2	7
1974	Qualifying Stage	4	1	1	2	3	9
1976	Did Not Enter						
Total	0/2	10	1	4	5	5	16

=== Balkan Youth Championship ===
Albania Under-23 participated in the Balkan Youth Championship tournaments from 1969 until 1976 when the age limit rule changed to the under 21, and then Albania participated with the Albania national under 21 football team. In two first tournament 1969 & 1970, Albania U23 was ranked 3rd out 5 national teams Participations in both occasions. Then in the 1971 & 1972 tournament they were ranked in the 4th place in both cases. They withdrew from the 1973 tournament and in the 1974 edition, Albania U23 managed to reach the final after winning Group B against Turkey U23 & Greece U23 by defeating Greece 2-1 and drawing Turkey 1–1 in the next match, before losing In the final 0–1 against Romania U23, it was Albania's first trip into the finals at this competition.

=== Balkan Youth Championship record ===
Balkan Youth Championship record
Year	Round	Position	Pld	W	D*	L	GF	GA
(Greece) 1968	Did Not Enter							
(Romania) 1969	Group Ch.	3rd	4	2	0	2	9	4
(Bulgaria) 1970	Group Ch.	3rd	4	2	1	1	3	2
(Greece) 1971	Group Ch.	4th	4	0	2	2	8	11
(Turkey) 1972	Semi-final	4th	3	1	0	2	3	5
(Socialist Federal Republic of Yugoslavia) 1973	Group Ch.	Withdrew						
(Romania) 1974	Runners-Up	2nd	3	1	1	1	3	3
(Bulgaria) 1975	Did Not Enter							
(Greece) 1976	Third Place	3rd	3	1	1	1	5	5
Total	Best:Runners-Up	6/8	21	7	4	9	31	30

*Denotes draws include knockout matches decided on penalty shoot-out.
**Gold background colour indicates that the tournament was won.

=== 1991 Mediterranean Games ===
Albania would compete for the first time ever at this competition in Football at the 1991 Mediterranean Games were they were drawn in Group B against the hosts Greece and Algeria. Despite losing against Greece 5-0 the Albanians were able to record their first win against Algeria 2-1 despite that Albania missed the next thase. Finishing the Tournament in 6th Place. So far Albania's best finish at the Mediterranean Games in the Football history for Albania.

=== 1997 Mediterranean Games ===
Albania's second participation came 6 years later were they faced Italy and FR Yugoslavia. This time Albania had less success, as they lost both matches against FR Yugoslavia with 1-3 despite a goal from Erjon Bogdani. Followed by a loss against Italy goalless with 0-4 finishing last in the Group. Caming only 11th in the Tournament.

=== Mediterranean Games - football ===
Football at the Mediterranean Games record
Year	Round	Position	GP	W	D	L	GS	GA
(Greece) 1991	Group stage	6th	2	1	0	1	2	6
(Italy) 1997	Group stage	11th	2	0	0	2	1	7
Total	0/2	Best: 6th	4	1	0	3	3	13

=== Balkan Youth Championship ===
Albania Under-21 participated in the Balkan Youth Championship as a succeeder of Under-23 team, in the 1976–78 and 1981 competitions, winning both with finals against Romania and Bulgaria. Notably in 1978, the second leg of the final match against Romania was characterized by a large Albania's win 7–1, which is the largest win ever recorded by Albania U-21.

=== Honours of Albania U-21 ===
Balkan Youth Championship record
Year	Round	Position	Pld	W	D*	L	GF	GA
1976–1978	Champions	1st	6	3	2	1	12	6
(Greece) 1981	Champions	1st	2	2	0	0	6	2
Total	2 Titles	2/2	8	5	2	1	18	8

*Denotes draws include knockout matches decided on penalty shoot-out.
**Gold background colour indicates that the tournament was won.

=== 1984 UEFA European Under-21 Football Championship ===
Albania Under-21s qualified for UEFA European Under-21 Football Championship for the first time in 1984, and were drawn in a group that included West Germany, Turkey and Austria. Albania won four matches: two against Austria with 1-2 and 3-0, and two against Turkey with 0-1 and 1-0. Notably, the team's match against West Germany ended in a draw. This was also the first time any Albanian squad qualified for a Europe or World Championship, and is the seventh time any Albanian squad qualified for a major championship. To this day, the team that qualified for 1984 UEFA European Under-21 Football Championship is still regarded as the most successful team in Albanian football history. It was at time coached by Shyqyri Rreli and Ramazan Rragami.

==== Qualifying Group 6 standings ====
Qualifying Group 6		P	W	D	L	F	A	Pts
1	Albania	6	4	2	0	9	3	10
2	West Germany	6	3	3	0	13	4	9
3	Turkey	6	1	1	4	6	11	3
4	Austria	6	0	2	4	4	14	2

- Austria 1–2 Albania
- Turkey 0–1 Albania
- Albania 1–1 West Germany
- Albania 1–0 Turkey
- Albania 3–0 Austria
- West Germany 1–1 Albania

Albania played the quarter-finals against Italy, against which it lost twice 0–1, and 0–1, in Albania and Italy respectively. Italy advanced to the semifinals of Euro '84 and lost them against England, eventual champions of the tournament. The under 21 was voted by the English Football Magazine Soccer in 1983 as the 8th best team in the world. The highest place for any Albanian side to finish. In the Albanian football history so far.

==== Tournament bracket ====
Quarter-finals
England	6	1	7
France	1	0	1
Albania	0	0	0
Italy	1	1	2
Scotland	2	1	3
Yugoslavia	1	3	4
Poland	2	1	3
Spain	2	4	6

Semi-finals
England	3	0	3
Italy	1	1	2
Yugoslavia	0	0	0
Spain	1	2	3

Final
England	1	2	3
Spain	0	0	0

=== 2004: Albania's most successful campaign in 20 years after 1984 ===
After 20 years Albania had its first success in the qualifiers for the 2004 UEFA European Under-21 Championship. In which they were drawn in Group 10 against Switzerland, Russia the Republic of Ireland and Georgia. Albania draw their first match at home against Switzerland in a goalless draw. Followed by two losses against Russia. Narrowly away with 1-0, conceding the goal in the 88th minute. Followed by a devastating home loss with 1–4. Things would change for Albania as they would win their next two matches against the Republic of Ireland. In the Selman Stërmasi Stadium Albania secured its first win during qualifying with a 1–0 win thanks to a late strike from striker Erjon Rizvanolli. Followed by an 0–3 win in the Dalymount Park as Ireland included a suspended player in their squad. Securing so Albania back to back wins. Against Switzerland Albania lost 2–1 away despite leading the match at some point. In their 7th and 8th match Albania faced Georgia twice. Losing away with 3-1 but would return its fortune in the following match at home with a 3–0 win to secure its third win during qualification, with goals from Muzaka and two goals from Parid Xhihani. Albania would finish third in the standings only behind Group Winners Switzerland and Russia and ahead of the Republic of Ireland and Georgia. Securing 10 Points three wins and one draw as well as a neutral goal difference.

==== Qualifying Group 10 standings ====
Team	Pld	W	D	L	GF	GA	GD	Pts
Switzerland	8	6	1	1	12	6	+6	19
Russia	8	5	0	3	14	8	+6	15
Albania	8	3	1	4	10	10	0	10
Republic of Ireland	8	2	2	4	8	11	−3	8
Georgia	8	1	2	5	7	16	−9	5

=== 2027 UEFA European Under-21 Championship ===
After a long period without qualifying to the UEFA European Under-21 Championship, Albania, "together" with Serbia, will host the 2027 UEFA European Under-21 Championship. Despite that the Tifozat Kuq e zi are demanding a drastic exit, towards this tournament, as Serbia is still denying the war crimes in the past during the Kosovo war in 1998–99. This faced criticism towards Armando Duka as he did not take the opinion of the Albanian football fans seriously.

=== 1982 UEFA European Under-18 Championship in Finland ===
The Albania national under-18 football team would qualify once for an UEFA European Championship in their history, in the 1982 UEFA European Under-18 Championship held in Finland. Were they would qualify after beating Cyprus 4–2 on aggregate in the playoffs. In the Group they faced, Scotland, the Netherlands and Turkey. Albania would lose against Scotland 3–0 as well as against the Netherlands despite a goal from Sokol Kushta. Albania were able to get a point against Turkey drawing 1–1 in total. Albania could not qualify for the Semifinals as they finished in fourth place in the Groupstage with one point.

==== Playoffs ====
Team 1	Agg.	Team 2	1st leg	2nd leg
Albania; Demollari 12' 14'; Zacharias (o.g.); Kushta 75'	4–2	Cyprus	4–0	0–2

==== Second round - Group D ====
Teams	Pld	W	D	L	GF	GA	GD	Pts
Scotland	3	2	1	0	6	1	+5	5
Netherlands	3	2	1	0	7	3	+4	5
Turkey	3	0	1	2	2	6	–4	1
Albania	3	0	1	2	2	7	–5	1

21 May	Scotland	3–0	Albania
	Netherlands	3–1	Albania
	Turkey	1–1	Albania

=== 1983 UEFA European Under-18 Championship ===
Albania tried to repeat its success in the previous year, they faced Bulgaria. Albania could not repeat their previous success, despite their 1–0 win at home by a goal from Sokol Kushta. Losing the previous match away with 4–0 in Bulgaria.

==== Playoffs ====
Team 1	Agg.	Team 2	1st leg	2nd leg
Bulgaria	4–1	Albania	4–0	0–1

=== 1988 UEFA European Under-18 Championship ===
Albania faced in Group 7 the Netherlands, Bulgaria and Hungary. Albania was able to exceed its targets. As they were able to secure all their points at home. Drawing at home against the Netherlands with 1-1 than followed by close wins twice with 1–0 against Hungary and Bulgaria. Despite that Albania missed out close on qualification as they could not win any further points away. Still their best results during a qualification for Albania at this competition.

==== Group 7 ====
Teams	Pld	W	D	L	GF	GA	GD	Pts
Netherlands	6	2	3	1	5	3	+2	7
Bulgaria	6	3	1	2	11	10	+1	7
Hungary	6	2	1	3	11	7	+4	5
Albania	6	2	1	3	3	10	–7	5

Albania	1–1	Netherlands
Albania	1–0	Hungary
Bulgaria	4–0	Albania
Albania	1–0	Bulgaria
Netherlands	2–0	Albania
Hungary	3–0	Albania

=== Recent History of Albania's U19 ===
Despite not reaching the UEFA European Under-19 Championship, Albania had some great campaigns in their history. Especially in 2005 where they reached the Elite Round. After beating the hosts Denmark 0-3 despite heavily losing against Finland, Albania would redeem itself as they would then beat Luxembourg 1–0 to finish first in their Group. In the Elite Round Albania could not qualify as they finished in last in Group 7 against Poland the Republic of Ireland and Serbia and Montenegro. Achieving only one point against the Republic of Ireland in a 1–1 draw.

=== 2005 UEFA European Under-19 Championship qualification Group 6 ===
Team	Pld	W	D	L	GF	GA	GD	Pts
Albania	3	2	0	1	5	7	−2	6
Denmark	3	2	0	1	6	6	0	6
Finland	3	1	1	1	10	5	+5	4
Luxembourg	3	0	1	2	2	5	−3	1

All matches were played in Denmark.

Denmark	0–3	Albania
Finland	7–1	Albania
Albania	1–0	Luxembourg

=== 2009 Mediterranean Games in Pescara ===
The Albania national under-19 football team could not qualify so far in any UEFA European Under-19 Championship. In the past, Albania competed in Football at the Mediterranean Games as they did in previous times. Their first Participation as an Under-19 side came at the 2009 Mediterranean Games in Pescara. They Faced in Group D Tunisia and Spain. They lost their first match close against Tunisia despite leading from a goal from Ardit Shehaj with 1–2 in the end. After they lost against Spain as well Albania finished their campaign in tenth place.

=== 2013 Mediterranean Games in Turkey ===
Albania would compete for the fourth time at the 2013 Mediterranean Games in Turkey. Albania faced in Group A the hosts, Turkey, Bosnia and Herzegovina and Morocco. This time around Albania made some slight improvements. Despite losing against the hosts Turkey. Albania were able to draw 2–2 against Bosnia, with goals from Turtulli and future Napoli star Amir Rrahmani. Their first point at this Group. In the following match against Morocco Albania lost close despite an equalizer from Klodian Gino. This time finishing the group in 3rd place in the Groupstandings. In the classification matches, Albania was not able to improve as they lost to neighbours North Macedonia with 1-2 and against Italy for the seventh place losing this time 1-3 and finishing this tournament in eighth place.

=== Mediterranean Games record ===
Football at the Mediterranean Games record
Year	Round	Position	GP	W	D	L	GS	GA
(Italy) 2009	Group stage	10th	2	0	0	2	1	5
(Turkey) 2013	Group stage	8th	5	0	1	4	5	11
Total	0/2	Best: 8th	7	0	1	6	6	16

=== 2024 WAFF U-19 Championship ===
Albania recently participate at the 2024 WAFF U-19 Championship in Saudi Arabia. They faced in their Group Lebanon, Iraq and Jordan. In their debut match Albania were able to beat Lebanon with a score of 2–0 with goals from Krasniqi and Jordi Jaku. Against Iraq Albania were able to secure a 1–1 draw. But in the decisive match against Jordan, Albania would lose 3–0 in total missing out close on the Semifinals. This would be the first time that Albania took place in an intercontinental tournament in their history.

WAFF U-19 Championship
Year	Result	Pld	W	D	L	GF	GA
(Saudi Arabia) 2024	Group stages	3	1	1	1	3	4
Total	Gropstage	3	1	1	1	3	4

=== 1993 UEFA European Under-16 Championship qualifying ===
The first notable campaign for Albania came during the qualification for the 1993 UEFA European Under-16 Championship were they faced Portugal. They lost their first match away 3-1 despite their loss, the Albanians fought back and won at home 1-0 missing out on qualification by one goal. It was Albania's first successful qualification, during their U16/17 era.

==== Group 5 ====
Teams	Pld	W	D	L	GF	GA	GD	Pts
Portugal	2	1	0	1	3	2	+1	2
Albania	2	1	0	1	2	3	-1	2

27 January 1993	Portugal	3-1	Albania
3 March 1993	Albania	1-0	Portugal

==== Group 5 ====
Albania were able to win both their matches in a relatively easy Group, Against Liechtenstein and Malta. It would be their last time that they finished first in the table, in their category.

Teams	Pld	W	D	L	GF	GA	GD	Pts
Albania	2	2	0	0	3	0	+3	4
Liechtenstein	2	1	0	1	0	1	-1	1
Malta	2	1	0	1	0	2	-2	1

28 February 1994	Albania	1-0	Liechtenstein
2 March 1994	Albania	2-0	Malta

=== 1994 UEFA European Under-16 Championship in Ireland ===
The Albania national under-16 football team would qualify, after beating Malta and Liechtenstein during the qualification. They made than their debut at the 1994 UEFA European Under-16 Championship. In which Albania was able to secure a one 1–1 draw against Belarus. After that they lost close to Austria with 0-1 and to Spain with 0-4 finishing in last place in the Groupstage.

=== Group A ===
Team	Pld	W	D	L	GF	GA	GD	Pts
Belarus	3	1	2	0	3	2	+1	5
Austria	3	1	2	0	3	2	+1	5
Spain	3	1	1	1	5	2	+3	4
Albania	3	0	1	2	1	6	−5	1

26 April 1994

Austria	1–0	Albania

Oriel Park, Dundalk
Referee: Richard O'Hanlon (Republic of Ireland)

28 April 1994

Belarus	1–1	Albania

United Park, Drogheda
Referee: Brendan Shorte (Republic of Ireland)

30 April 1994

Albania	0–4	Spain
		Cabello 20'; Etxeberria 30', 51'; Rubén García 34'

Oriel Park, Dundalk
Referee: Knud Erik Fisker (Denmark)

=== 1997 UEFA European Under-16 Championship qualifying ===
Albania faced in Group 2 for the 1997 UEFA European Under-16 Championship Israel and Yugoslavia. In their first match Albania was able to make a surprising win against Yugoslavia winning by 2-1 but would come short in the next match against Israel losing 1-0 missing out close for qualifying, to the main tournament.

==== Group 2 ====
Teams	Pld	W	D	L	GF	GA	GD	Pts
Israel	2	2	0	0	6	1	+5	6
Albania	2	1	0	1	2	2	0	3
Yugoslavia	2	0	0	2	2	7	-5	0

6 March 1997	Albania	2-1	Yugoslavia
8 March 1997	Israel	1-0	Albania

=== Albania's recent U17 history ===
Despite Albania having never qualified in any Under-17 major tournament, the Albanians managing the elite round, four times their first Elite Round came in 2003 were Albania were able to defeat Lithuania and San Marino before drawing to Group Favourites the Netherlands. Despite that Albania could not follow its success during their Elite Round finishing last in a Group consisting of Switzerland, Hungary and Greece. Losing two matches and drawing one match against Hungary with 3-3 securing one point.

==== 2003 UEFA European Under-17 Championship qualification Group 10 ====
Pos	Team	Pld	W	D	L	GF	GA	GD	Pts	Qualification
1	Netherlands	3	2	1	0	8	2	+6	7	Elite round
2	Albania	3	2	1	0	5	2	+3	7	Elite round
3	Lithuania	3	1	0	2	3	7	−4	3	
4	San Marino	3	0	0	3	0	5	−5	0	

Source: worldfootball

After nine season Albania once again reached the "elite round" in 2012 were Albania finished second in Group 12 consisting of Germany, Slovakia and Estonia. Albania were able to defeat Slovakia 2–1 by goals from Ymeralilaj. Albania than lost tight to Germany 0-1 followed by a poor draw against Estland despite leading. Still enough to qualify for the next round. In the Elite Round Albania than faced in Group 5: The Netherlands, Republic of Ireland and Serbia. After suffering two heavy losses against the Netherlands and Serbia, Albania would win its final match against the Republic of Ireland 2–1 with goals of Marku and Ymeralilaj, to finish their campaign in third in the standings but miss out on the main tournament.

==== 2011 UEFA European Under-17 Championship qualification Group 12 ====
Team	Pld	W	D	L	GF	GA	GD	Pts
Germany	3	3	0	0	8	0	+8	9
Albania	3	1	1	1	3	3	0	4
Slovakia	3	1	0	2	6	4	+2	3
Estonia	3	0	1	2	1	11	−10	1

13 October 2011
14:00

Slovakia	1–2	Albania
Ďuriš 45'	Report	Ymeralilaj 43', 58'

Kadrioru Stadium, Tallinn
Attendance: 53
Referee: Domagoj Vučkov (Croatia)

15 October 2011
18:00

Albania	0–1	Germany
	Report	Sarr 52' (pen.)

Kadrioru Stadium, Tallinn
Attendance: 70
Referee: Davit Kharitonashvili (Georgia)

18 October 2011
14:00

Estonia	1–1	Albania
Paur 80'	Report	Jonuzi 52' (pen.)

A. Le Coq Arena, Tallinn
Attendance: 95
Referee: Davit Kharitonashvili (Georgia)

2014 under the coach Džemal Mustedanagić in both cases and nine years later in 2023.

=== Hosting the 2025 UEFA European Under-17 Championship in Tirana ===
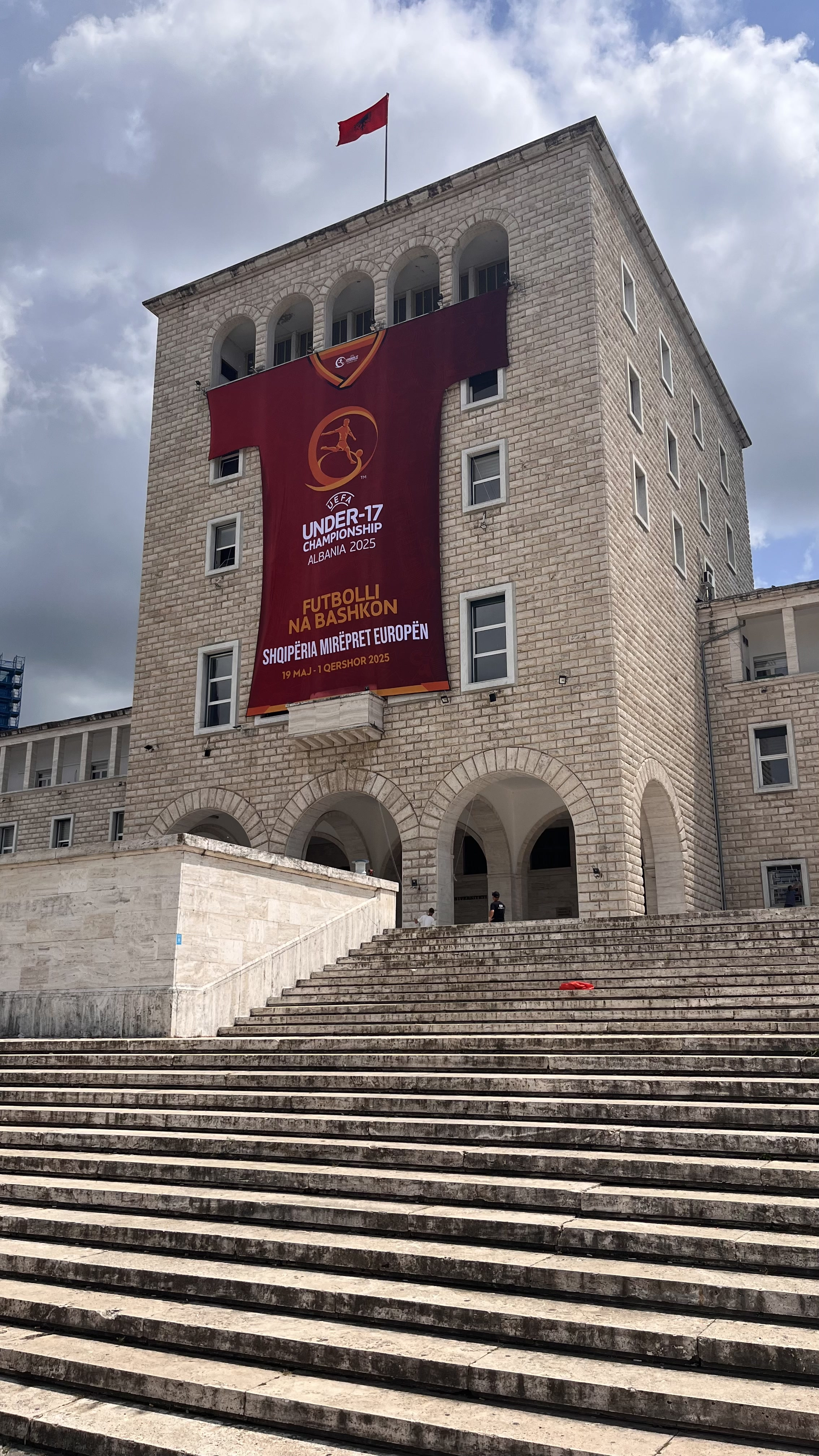
Promotion for the tournament in Tirana

After more than thirty years without a participation the Under 17 of Albania would host the 2025 UEFA European Under-17 Championship in Tirana. Playing in Group A against France, Germany and Portugal. Taking place for the second time in their history in the U17 category. Albania would lose all three matches during their campaign with 0–4 against Portugal, Germany and France finishing last in the Groupstage.

==== Group A ====
Pos	Team	Pld	W	D	L	GF	GA	GD	Pts	Qualification
1	France	3	2	1	0	7	0	+7	7	Knockout stage
2	Portugal	3	2	1	0	6	1	+5	7	Knockout stage
3	Germany	3	1	0	2	5	5	0	3	
4	Albania (H)	3	0	0	3	0	12	−12	0	

Source: UEFA
Rules for classification: Group stage tiebreakers
(H) Hosts
19 May 2025
18:00

Albania	0−4	Portugal
	Report	Quintas 36'; Mide 68' (pen.); Cabral 82'; Soares 90+2'

Arena Kombëtare, Tirana
Attendance: 8,662
Referee: Patrik Kolarić (Croatia)

22 May 2025
18:00

Albania	0–4	Germany
	Report	Mensah 7'; Staff 20'; Mike 66'; Oteng-Mensah 85' (pen.)

Elbasan Arena, Elbasan
Attendance: 8,330
Referee: Kamal Umudlu (Azerbaijan)

25 May 2025
20:30

France	4–0	Albania
Malonga 33'; Coulibaly 51'; N'Guessan 66', 79'	Report

Elbasan Arena, Elbasan
Attendance: 4,400
Referee: Oleksiy Derevinskyi (Ukraine)

== Domestic football ==
The Kategoria Superiore is the main division in Albania; their first season started in 1930. Apart from 1938 to 1944 it took place every season. The club with the most titles is KF Tirana who won this competition 25 times. The Albanian Football Cup was founded since 1938-39 in which KF Tirana being the most successful club in the country with 16 titles closely followed by Partizani Tirana who won this competition 15 times so far.

The first Albanian club to participate in European football was Partizani Tirana, which took Albania's European Cup spot in 1960. Albanian participation in European competition was erratic through the country's communist era, with regular politically motivated withdrawals from matches by Albanian clubs often leading to lengthy bans from UEFA. However, despite these teething problems Albanian teams continued to appear sporadically in the European Cup.

The biggest domestic football success came in the 1980s when Albanian clubs frequently reached the last 16 in UEFA competitions.

=== Albania's start at the European Cup 1960-1982 ===
The first Albanian club to enter the European Cup was FK Partizani Tirana in 1962-63 playing in the first round against Norrköping losing out after two legs despite drawing at home with 1–1 in the second leg. The following year, Partizani won their first-ever match in the European Cup 1963-64 in the first leg against Plovdiv through a goal from Kolec Kraja. In the second leg away from home, Partizani nearly qualified for the second round but lost 1-3 despite a goal from Panajot Pano. One year later in 1964–65 Partizani Tirana faced 1. FC Köln from Germany in the preliminary round. The Albanians surprised the Germans and held a 0–0 draw at home. In the second leg in Cologne Partizani Tirana lost the match 0–2. KF Tirana first entered the European Football scene in 1969-70. After losing the first leg against Belgian team Standard Liège 0–3 away from home, they drew at home 1–1 thanks to a late goal from Josif Kazanxhi.

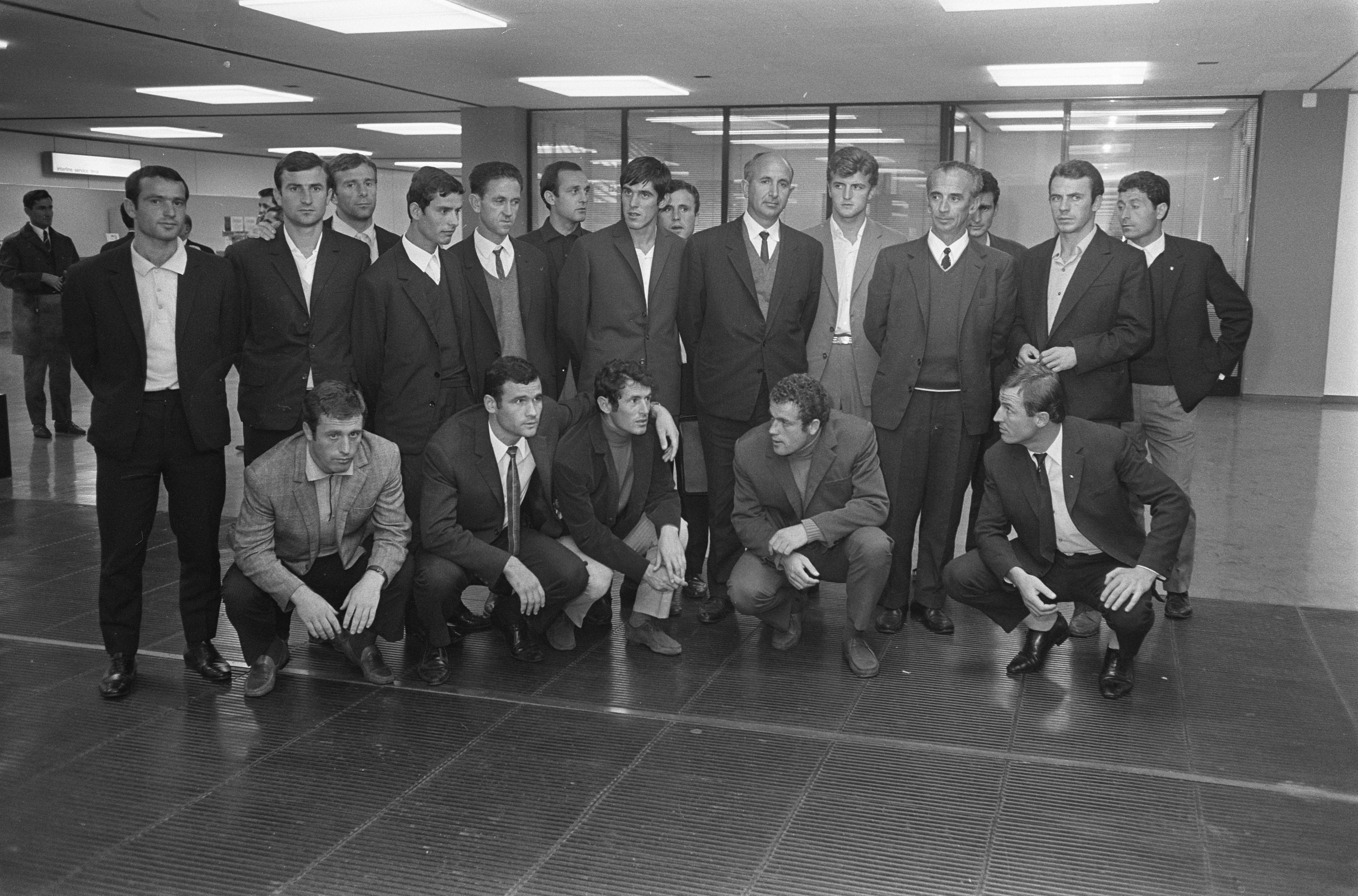
KF Tirana (Sept. 1970) before facing Ajax Amsterdam

In the following year, KF Tirana faced Eredivisie team AFC Ajax in the 1970–71 European Cup in the first round. Tirana drew Ajax 2–2 after losing 0–2 at home. The Albanians equalized the game thanks to goals from Josif Kazanxhi and Ceco. Tirana faced Ajax in the second leg at the Olympisch Stadion in Amsterdam. Ajax won the game 2–0 and went on to win the Cup.

KF Vllaznia Shkodër debuted at the European Cup 1978-79 facing FK Austria Wien in the first round. Vllaznia beat Austria in the first leg 2–0 with goals from Medin Zhega and Shyqyri Ballgjini. In the following match, Vllaznia had good chances to qualify as the first Albanian football club in the round of 16. The hopes were dashed for Vllaznia as they lost with 4–1 away in Wien. Partizani Tirana qualified for the Cup for the fourth time in 1979–80 and beat Celtic 1–0 in the first match with a header from Agim Murati in the 35th minute. Celtic turned things around and beat Partizani 4–1 despite an own goal in the Celtic Park in Glasgow. Two years later in the 1981–82 European Cup, Partizani Tirana faced Austria Wien in the first round. Partizani lost the first leg away match 1–3. The Albanians played the second leg at home in the Qemal Stafa Stadium and won 1–0. Haxhi Ballgjini scored the goal for Partizani in the 31st minute. Partizani needed to score two goals to qualify into the second round, and they were eliminated from the competition despite the victory. Two years later in the 1981–82 European Cup, Partizani Tirana faced Austria Wien in the first round. Partizani lost the first leg away match 1–3. The Albanians played the second leg at home in the Qemal Stafa Stadium and won 1–0. Haxhi Ballgjini scored the goal for Partizani in the 31st minute. Partizani needed to score two goals to qualify into the second round, and they were eliminated at the competition despite the victory.

=== KF Tiranas Golden 80's in Europe ===
Their first successful year for the Albanian came at the 1982–83 European Cup when KF Tirana faced Linfield F.C. in the first round. The teams played the first leg in Tirana. Tirana won the match 1–0 with a goal from Agustin Kola. In the second leg match, Tirana faced Linfied at Windsor Park in Belfast. Arben Minga scored in the 28th minute, but Linfied scored two quick goals in the final minutes of the match. Despite the 2–1 away loss, KF Tirana qualified as the first Albanian football club ever in the history for the round of 16 in the European Cup. The team would have played against Dynamo Kyiv in the round of 16, but Tirana did not participate.

After several years without success for Albania, KF Tirana achieved its next success in the history at the European Cup in 1988-89. The team faced the Hamrun Spartans from Malta in the first round. In the first leg, they played away from home at National Stadium in Ta' Qali. KF Tirana started with a goal from Anesti Stoja in the 5th minute, but Ħamrun scored two goals to win the match 2–1. In the second leg, Tirana defeated the Spartans 2–0 to qualify for the round of 16. In the first leg of the round of 16, Tirana faced IFK Göteborg at home and lost the match 0–3. Tirana defeated IFK Göteborg 1–0 in the second leg at Ullevi stadium but did not qualify for the quarter-finals.

In the following Season KF Tirana followed their path in the European Cup in 1989–90, while facing Maltese League winner Sliema Wanderers F.C. in the first round. The first leg was played away from home in the National Stadium. The Albanians lost 0–1. KF Tirana won the second leg game 5–0 with goals from Agustin Kola, Bardhi, Hodja, and Florian Riza to advance to the round of 16 for the third time in the club's history. In the round of 16, KF Tirana faced Bundesliga team FC Bayern Munich from Germany. In the first leg at the Olympiastadion in Munich, KF Tirana lost 3–1. In the second match, Tirana faced Bayern at home and lost 0–3.

=== 2015–16 ===
They kicked off the 2015–16 campaign with their biggest ever Champions League and European win, as they defeated Northern Ireland side Crusaders 4–1. They lost the away match 2–3, but qualified to the third qualifying round for the second time with an aggregate 6–4 score and they faced Milsami Orhei. They beat Milsami 2–0 both home and away to become the only Albanian side to qualify to the UEFA Champions League play-offs, where they met Dinamo Zagreb. They were defeated 1–2 at home and 1–4 away and eliminated from Champions League. They were dropped into the UEFA Europa League group stages, becoming the first Albanian club to progress to the group stage of a European competition. Skënderbeu Korçë were drawn against Beşiktaş, Lokomotiv Moscow and Sporting Clube de Portugal. In matchday 1, their first ever group stage game, the club was defeated at home 0–1 by Beşiktaş after a hard fight between the two sides. In the next matchday, they lost 0–2 to Lokomotiv Moscow in Moscow. Their worst defeat in the European competition yet came the next matchday, a storming 1–5 loss to Sporting in the away leg at Lisbon, but also had the Albanian side scoring their first goal in the UEFA Europa League group stages. In the home match, Skënderbeu Korçë recorded a historic 3–0 win over Sporting, was one of the most important victories of a football club in Albania as Skënderbeu recorded their first points in a Europa League group stage game.

=== 2017-18 ===
Skënderbeu entered Europa League, as they finished third in Albanian Superliga. They played against UE Sant Julia, defeating them 1–0 at home and 5–0 in Andorra, so they qualified. For the 2nd round, they played against the Kazakhstan outfit, Kairat. The match ended in a draw (1–1) in Kazakhstan and won 2–0 at home. They then went on to play the Czech Republic side, FK Mladá Boleslav and lost 2–1 on the night in the Czech Republic. The return match in Elbasan Arena saw Skënderbeu winning the regular time 2–1, while the extra periods yielded no further goals. Skënderbeu ultimately triumphed 4–2 on penalties. For the play-off round, they were drawn against Dinamo Zagreb for their second time, just like the UEFA Champions League play-off two years ago, where Skënderbeu were eliminated 6–2 on aggregate. They surprised Dinamo in the away match by scoring through Liridon Latifi in the 37th minute, but conceding in the very last minute. Even though Skënderbeu did not win, they could hope for the Europa League qualification thanks to the away goal scored. Skënderbeu needed at least a goalless draw to progress to the next stage of the competition. In the return leg, that was exactly what happened. Skënderbeu qualified for the group stage for the second time in their history, and also being the first Albanian team to win four qualifying rounds in the Europa League. Also, they have been the only Albanian club to earn more than three points, which was the record for the most points earned in the Europa League group stage by an Albanian club two years ago.

And following the fall of communism in Albania the country's teams featured more regularly in European football. UEFA support was a crucial factor in enabling Albanian football to develop from 1991 onwards, as the country transitioned to democracy.

== See also ==
- Albania National Football Team
- History of the Albania national football team
- Albania national football team records and statistics
- Albanian football clubs in European competitions
- Football in Albania
- Albania–Serbia football rivalry
