= Mikkel Jensen =

Mikkel Jensen is the name of:

- Mikkel Jensen (footballer, born 1977), Danish footballer
- Mikkel Jensen (footballer, born 1995), Danish footballer
- Mikkel Jensen (racing driver) (born 1994), Danish racing driver
- Mikkel Rygaard Jensen (born 1990), Danish footballer
- Mikkel Bech Jensen (born 1994), Danish speedway rider
