= 2012 UEFA European Under-17 Championship elite round =

Association football tournament

2012 UEFA European Under-17 Football Championship elite round was the second round of qualifications for the final tournament of UEFA U-17 Championship 2012. The 28 teams advancing from the qualifying round were distributed into seven groups of four teams each, with each group contesting in a round-robin format, with one of the four teams hosting all six group games. The seven group-winning teams automatically qualified for the final tournament in Slovenia.

== Seeding ==
The draw for the elite round was held on 29 November 2011 in Nyon. Each team was placed in one of four drawing pots, according to their qualifying round results. The seven sides with the best records were placed in Pot A, and so forth until Pot D, which contained the seven teams with the weakest records. During the draw, each group was filled with one team from every pot, with the only restriction being that teams that played each other in the first qualifying round can not be drawn into the same group again.

Pot A	Pot B	Pot C	Pot D
France; Spain; Czech Republic; Denmark; Hungary; Serbia; Germany	England; Sweden; Scotland; Russia; Portugal; Belarus; Netherlands	Poland; Italy; Belgium; Georgia; Iceland; Turkey; Republic of Ireland	Switzerland; Bulgaria; Ukraine; Albania; Luxembourg; Lithuania; Wales

The hosts of the seven one-venue mini-tournament groups are indicated below in italics.

== Group 1 ==
Team	Pld	W	D	L	GF	GA	GD	Pts
France	3	3	0	0	6	2	+4	9
Sweden	3	1	1	1	3	3	0	4
Italy	3	1	1	1	2	2	0	4
Switzerland	3	0	0	3	2	6	−4	0

24 March 2012
15:00

France	1−0	Italy
Chemlal 71'	Report

Stade Guy Boniface, Mont-de-Marsan
Referee: Vitali Meshkov (Russia)
24 March 2012
18:00

Sweden	2−0	Switzerland
Tanković 5', 20'	Report

Stade Maurice Boyau, Dax
Referee: Orel Grinfeld (Israel)

26 March 2012
15:00

Italy	0−0	Sweden
	Report

Stade de l'Argenté, Mont-de-Marsan
Referee: Aleksandrs Anufrijevs (Latvia)
26 March 2012
18:00

France	2−1	Switzerland
Corentin 19'; Martial 40+2'	Report	Tarashaj 68'

Stade André Darriguade, Dax
Referee: Orel Grinfeld (Israel)

29 March 2012
18:00

Sweden	1−3	France
Zeneli 70'	Report	Corentin 40'; Martial 62'; Said 73'

Stade Guy Boniface, Mont-de-Marsan
Referee: Aleksandrs Anufrijevs (Latvia)
29 March 2012
18:00

Switzerland	1−2	Italy
Tarashaj 73'	Report	Cerri 70'; Tutino 74'

Stade André Darriguade, Dax
Referee: Vitali Meshkov (Russia)

== Group 2 ==
Team	Pld	W	D	L	GF	GA	GD	Pts
Poland	3	3	0	0	7	1	+6	9
Czech Republic	3	1	1	1	2	3	−1	4
Belarus	3	0	2	1	1	3	−2	2
Luxembourg	3	0	1	2	3	6	−3	1

24 March 2012
16:00

Czech Republic	0−2	Poland
	Report	Rabiega 35'; Stępiński 48'

Achille Hammerel, Luxembourg
Referee: Michael Johansen (Denmark)
24 March 2012
18:00

Belarus	1−1	Luxembourg
Kaplenko 68'	Report	Steinmetz 65'

John Grün, Mondorf-les-Bains
Referee: Gunnar Jarl Jónsson (Iceland)

26 March 2012
16:30

Poland	2−0	Belarus
Stępiński 3'; Cierpka 16'	Report

John Grün, Mondorf-les-Bains
Referee: Christos Nicolaides (Cyprus)
26 March 2012
19:00

Czech Republic	2−1	Luxembourg
Matoušek 38'; Chorý 78'	Report	Holter 80+2'

La Frontière, Esch-sur-Alzette
Referee: Gunnar Jarl Jónsson (Iceland)

29 March 2012
19:00

Belarus	0−0	Czech Republic
	Report

La Frontière, Esch-sur-Alzette
Referee: Michael Johansen (Denmark)
29 March 2012
19:00

Luxembourg	1−3	Poland
Thill 18'	Report	Łasicki 32'; Cierpka 55'; Linetty 73'

Achille Hammerel, Luxembourg
Referee: Christos Nicolaides (Cyprus)

== Group 3 ==
Team	Pld	W	D	L	GF	GA	GD	Pts
Georgia	3	2	1	0	3	1	+2	7
Spain	3	1	2	0	7	3	+4	5
England	3	1	0	2	1	5	−4	3
Ukraine	3	0	1	2	2	4	−2	1

26 March 2012
12:00

Spain	1−1	Georgia
Sáez 59'	Report	Chechelashvili 2' (pen.)

Mikheil Meskhi, Tbilisi
Referee: Chris Reisch (Luxembourg)
26 March 2012
14:00

England	1−0	Ukraine
Chambers 56'	Report

Boris Paichadze, Tbilisi
Referee: Markus Hameter (Austria)

28 March 2012
12:00

Georgia	1−0	England
Papunashvili 80+4'	Report

Mikheil Meskhi, Tbilisi
Referee: Chris Reisch (Luxembourg)
28 March 2012
14:00

Spain	2−2	Ukraine
Calero 19'; Bustos 72'	Report	Tyshchenko 8'; Bilonoh 71'

Boris Paichadze, Tbilisi
Referee: Nikolay Yordanov (Bulgaria)

31 March 2012
12:00

England	0−4	Spain
	Report	Calero 45'; Grimaldo 47'; Samper 57'; Gayà 80+4'

Boris Paichadze, Tbilisi
Referee: Nikolay Yordanov (Bulgaria)
31 March 2012
12:00

Ukraine	0−1	Georgia
	Report	Mzevashvili 6'

Mikheil Meskhi, Tbilisi
Referee: Markus Hameter (Austria)

== Group 4 ==
Team	Pld	W	D	L	GF	GA	GD	Pts
Germany	3	2	1	0	6	1	+5	7
Portugal	3	1	2	0	3	0	+3	5
Bulgaria	3	1	1	1	3	2	+1	4
Turkey	3	0	0	3	0	9	−9	0

20 March 2012
15:00

Germany	4−0	Turkey
Meyer 20'; Çağıran 29' (o.g.); Benkarit 74'; Lohkemper 79'	Report

Sportpark am Vinnenweg, Bremen
Referee: Kevin Clancy (Scotland)
20 March 2012
18:00

Portugal	0−0	Bulgaria
	Report

Weserstadion Platz 11, Bremen
Referee: Jonathan Lardot (Belgium)

22 March 2012
12:00

Germany	2−1	Bulgaria
Meyer 7', 18'	Report	Tsonev 57'

Weserstadion Platz 11, Bremen
Referee: Mitja Žganec (Slovenia)
22 March 2012
15:00

Turkey	0−3	Portugal
	Report	Podstawski 15'; Rodrigues 39' (pen.); A. Silva 62'

BSA Obervieland, Bremen
Referee: Kevin Clancy (Scotland)

25 March 2012
12:00

Portugal	0−0	Germany
	Report

Sportpark am Vinnenweg, Bremen
Referee: Mitja Žganec (Slovenia)
25 March 2012
12:00

Bulgaria	2−0	Turkey
Dryanov 13'; Angelov 18'	Report

BSA Obervieland, Bremen
Referee: Jonathan Lardot (Belgium)

== Group 5 ==
Team	Pld	W	D	L	GF	GA	GD	Pts
Netherlands	3	2	1	0	7	2	+5	7
Serbia	3	2	1	0	5	1	+4	7
Albania	3	1	0	2	2	8	−6	3
Republic of Ireland	3	0	0	3	2	5	−3	0

22 March 2012
17:00

Serbia	1−0	Republic of Ireland
Jokić 66'	Report

Sportpark Zuideinderpark, Schijndel
Referee: Ádám Németh (Hungary)
22 March 2012
19:00

Netherlands	4−0	Albania
Vilhena 37', 47'; Haye 49'; Vloet 52'	Report

sV Venray, Venray
Referee: Dennis Antamo (Finland)

24 March 2012
15:00

Serbia	3−0	Albania
Simić 32'; Veljković 58'; Janković 67'	Report

sV Venray, Venray
Referee: Andranik Arsenyan (Armenia)
24 March 2012
17:00

Republic of Ireland	1−2	Netherlands
Hayes 30' (pen.)	Report	Vilhena 43', 55'

Sportpark Zuideinderpark, Schijndel
Referee: Dennis Antamo (Finland)

27 March 2012
19:00

Netherlands	1−1	Serbia
Huser 60'	Report	Jokić 76'

Sportpark Zuideinderpark, Schijndel
Referee: Ádám Németh (Hungary)
27 March 2012
19:00

Albania	2−1	Republic of Ireland
Marku 35' (pen.); Ymeralilaj 49'	Report	Grealish 43'

sV Venray, Venray
Referee: Andranik Arsenyan (Armenia)

== Group 6 ==
Team	Pld	W	D	L	GF	GA	GD	Pts
Iceland	3	2	1	0	7	2	+5	7
Denmark	3	2	1	0	8	5	+3	7
Scotland	3	1	0	2	3	4	−1	3
Lithuania	3	0	0	3	1	8	−7	0

20 March 2012
19:30 (GMT+0)

Denmark	2−2	Iceland
Mathiasen 42', 55'	Report	Bergsson 47'; Birgisson 75'

Cappielow Park, Greenock
Referee: Domagoj Vučkov (Croatia)
20 March 2012
19:30 (GMT+0)

Scotland	1−0	Lithuania
Findlay 65'	Report

Somerset Park, Ayr
Referee: Johnny Casanova (San Marino)

22 March 2012
19:30 (GMT+0)

Denmark	3−1	Lithuania
Mathiasen 5'; Andersen 25'; Nielsen 26'	Report	Petravičius 73'

Somerset Park, Ayr
Referee: Johnny Casanova (San Marino)
22 March 2012
19:30 (GMT+0)

Iceland	1−0	Scotland
Finnbogason 43'	Report

Dumbarton Football Stadium, Dumbarton
Referee: Laurent Kopriwa (Luxembourg)

25 March 2012
15:00 (GMT+0)

Scotland	2−3	Denmark
Kidd 27'; Aird 67'	Report	Højbjerg 24'; Crone 63'; Jensen 74'

Cappielow Park, Greenock
Referee: Domagoj Vučkov (Croatia)
25 March 2012
15:00 (GMT+0)

Lithuania	0−4	Iceland
	Report	Sigurjónsson 15' (pen.); Thorsteinsson 21'; Bergsson 53'; Finnbogason 69'

Dumbarton Football Stadium, Dumbarton
Referee: Laurent Kopriwa (Luxembourg)

== Group 7 ==
Although Hungary originally won the group on goal difference, Belgium filed a complaint, as Russia had fielded an ineligible player in their match against Belgium. The 1–0 victory by Belgium was therefore replaced with a 3–0 default victory for Belgium, causing them to surpass Hungary in the standings. This decision was appealed by the Hungarian FA.

Team	Pld	W	D	L	GF	GA	GD	Pts
Belgium	3	2	1	0	8	2	+6	7
Hungary	3	2	1	0	10	5	+5	7
Russia	3	1	0	2	4	7	−3	3
Wales	3	0	0	3	2	10	−8	0

23 March 2012
15:00

Hungary	2−2	Belgium
Tóth 34'; Németh 40+3'	Report	Dendoncker 22'; Dehond 44'

Globall Football Park, Telki
Referee: Jari Järvinen (Finland)
23 March 2012
15:00

Russia	2−1	Wales
Yaschuk 22'; Koryan 71'	Report	Hill 62'

Grosics Gyula, Tatabánya
Referee: Vasilis Dimitriou (Cyprus)

25 March 2012
15:00

Hungary	5−1	Wales
Bobál 8', 60', 69'; Vida 24'; Medgyes 45'	Report	Jones 44'

Globall Football Park, Telki
Referee: Leonardo Guidi (San Marino)
25 March 2012
15:00

Belgium	~~1−0~~ 3−0	Russia
Dendoncker 70'	Report

Grosics Gyula, Tatabánya
Referee: Vasilis Dimitriou (Cyprus)

28 March 2012
15:00

Russia	2−3	Hungary
Turik 48'; Yaschuk 77'	Report	Berecz 39'; Bobál 43'; Farkas 80+2'

Globall Football Park, Telki
Referee: Jari Järvinen (Finland)
28 March 2012
15:00

Wales	0−3	Belgium
	Report	Dierckx 33', 60'; Biscotti 65'

Grosics Gyula, Tatabánya
Referee: Leonardo Guidi (San Marino)
