= Albania–Serbia football rivalry =

International football rivalry

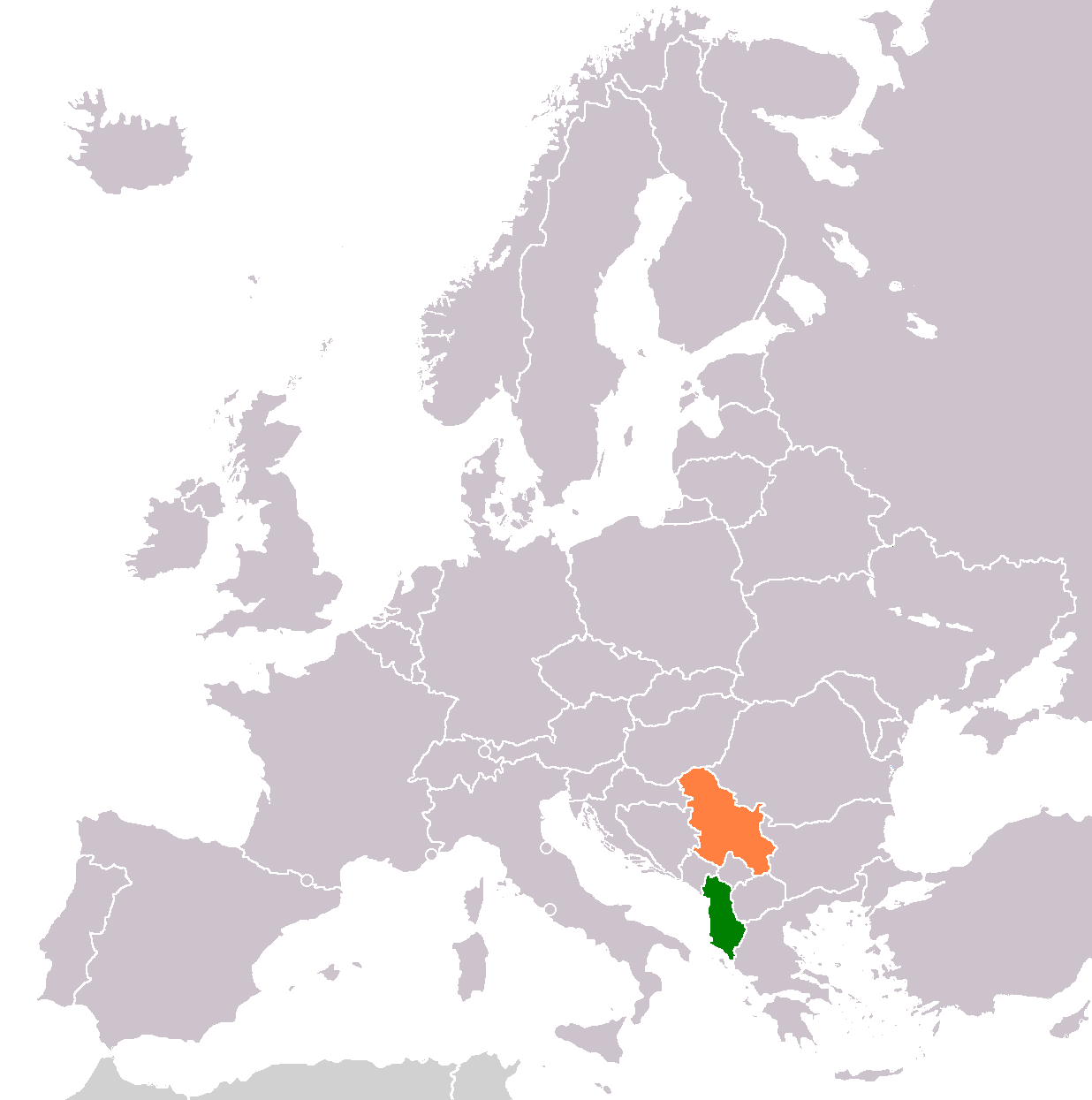
- Location of Albania (green), Serbia (orange)
- Sport: Football
- Location: Europe (UEFA)
- Teams: Albania; Serbia
- First meeting: As Albania–Serbia rivalry Serbia 0–3 Albania (Belgrade; 14 October 2014)
- Latest meeting: Albania 1–0 Serbia (Leskovac, 11 October 2025)
- Next meeting: Serbia v Albania (TBD)
- Stadiums: Albania: Arena Kombëtare, Elbasan Arena; Serbia: Partizan Stadium, Dubočica Stadium

Statistics
- Total meetings: Competitive matches: 4 Exhibition matches: 0 Total matches: 4
- Most wins: Competitive matches: Albania (2); Exhibition matches: 0 Total matches: Albania and Serbia (4)
- Top scorer: Rey Manaj, Kolarov; Adem Ljajić (1)
- All-time series: Albania: 2 Draw: 1 Serbia: 1

The Albania–Serbia football rivalry is a sports rivalry that exists between the national football teams of the two countries, as well as their respective sets of fans. The rivalry is considered to be one of the most bitter in the world owing to the events of the Kosovo War. Tense relations between the two nations are thus fueled by political and historical differences.

As of October 2025, the teams have played four matches against each other, with Albania winning two of them and Serbia one. The first match between the two countries took place on 14 October 2014, and ended in the Court of Arbitration for Sport (CAS) awarding a 3–0 victory to Albania after it had been abandoned following on-field incidents. The most recent match took place on 11 October 2025 which Albania won 1–0.

== History ==
=== 2016 Euro qualifiers ===
At the UEFA Euro 2016 qualification game, the first association football match between Albania and Serbia took place on 14 October 2014, at Partizan Stadium in Belgrade. At the beginning of the match, the Serbian crowd chanted Ubij, ubij Šiptara (Kill, kill the Albanian). Chants like "Kill the Serb", "Kill the Croat", and "Kill the Albanian” became part of the Balkan football folklore in stadiums across the region after nationalism rose after wars between the countries. Afterwards, a drone quadcopter carrying the map of Greater Albania appeared on the pitch. After Serbian player Stefan Mitrović tried to grab the flag, Albanian players attacked him. This led to a scuffle between the two sides. After the riot broke out, Branislav Ivanović said that the players shielded the Albanian players while they were going back to the tunnel. The match was abandoned at 0–0 after the fans invaded the pitch. FIFA's president condemned the behavior and UEFA punished both football associations.

==== First ever Line Up between: Albania VS Serbia ====
14 October 2014
20:45 CEST

Serbia	0–3 Awarded (Note: The Serbia v Albania match was abandoned with the score at 0–0 in the 42nd minute after "various incidents", which resulted in the Albania players refusing to return to the field. UEFA ruled that Albania had forfeited the match and awarded a 3–0 win to Serbia, and deducted three points from Serbia for their involvement in the events. Serbia were ordered next two home qualing games behind closed doors, and both Serbia and Albania were fined €100,000. The decision was appealed by both Serbia and Albania to UEFA, but the decision was upheld. Both associations then filed further appeals to the Court of Arbitration for Sport, and on 10 July 2015, the Court of Arbitration for Sport rejected the appeal filed by the Serbian FA, and upheld in part the appeal filed by the Albanian FA, meaning the match is deemed to have been forfeited by Serbia with the scoreline of 0–3 and Serbia are deducted three points.)	Albania
	Report

Partizan Stadium, Belgrade
Attendance: 25,200
Referee: Martin Atkinson (England)

GK	1	Vladimir Stojković
RB	6	Branislav Ivanović (c)	(yellow card) 35'
CB	13	Stefan Mitrović
CB	5	Matija Nastasić
LB	11	Aleksandar Kolarov
CM	8	Nemanja Gudelj
CM	14	Nemanja Matić
RW	7	Zoran Tošić
AM	19	Filip Đuričić
LW	10	Dušan Tadić
CF	18	Danko Lazović
Manager:
(Netherlands) Dick Advocaat

GK	1	Etrit Berisha
RB	4	Elseid Hysaj
CB	5	Lorik Cana (c)
CB	15	Mërgim Mavraj
LB	7	Ansi Agolli	(yellow card) 34'
DM	13	Burim Kukeli
CM	14	Taulant Xhaka
CM	22	Amir Abrashi
RM	2	Andi Lila
LM	3	Ermir Lenjani
CF	19	Bekim Balaj
Manager:
(Italy) Gianni De Biasi

On 10 July 2015, the Court of Arbitration for Sport (CAS), awarded a 3–0 victory to Albania, reversing an earlier UEFA ruling that had awarded Serbia a 3-0 victory. Serbia was also deducted three points. On 8 October the same year, the second match between the nations took place at the Elbasan Arena in Albania. The Serbian football team's bus was attacked by Albanian protesters with stones. A few hours before the kickoff, the Albanian police carried out riots, firing water cannon bursts as a helicopter buzzed over nearby buildings. The match ended with Serbia defeating Albania by 2–0 score. The second match was mostly free of tensions because heavy security and other measures were imposed to guard against incidents. The only sign of the intense rivalry was the loud booing by Albanian fans during the Serbian national anthem. Albania would qualify for the UEFA Euro 2016 in France finishing runner up to Portugal with 14 points, while Serbia would finish in 4th place with four points in the standings. The other teams of the group were Portugal, Denmark and Armenia.

=== Standings in Group I ===
Pos	Team	Pld	W	D	L	GF	GA	GD	Pts	Qualification
1	Portugal	8	7	0	1	11	5	+6	21	Qualify for final tournament
2	Albania	8	4	2	2	10	5	+5	14	Qualify for final tournament
3	Denmark	8	3	3	2	8	5	+3	12	Advance to play-offs
4	Serbia (Note: The Serbia v Albania match was awarded as a 3–0 win to Albania, and Serbia were also deducted three points, after the match was abandoned at 0–0 because home fans invaded the pitch and attacked Albania players when a drone carried a pro-Albanian flag over the stadium.)	8	2	1	5	8	13	−5	4	
5	Armenia	8	0	2	6	5	14	−9	2	

Source: UEFA
Rules for classification: Qualification tiebreakers

=== 2026 FIFA qualifiers ===
Albania and Serbia were drawn into Group K of 2026 FIFA World Cup qualification, with England, Latvia and Andorra. Many fans were shocked to see Albania and Serbia put in the same group due to past incidents in the 2016 Euro qualification games. Others questioned if another incident would occur during the qualification matches.

The first match between the two sides of the World Cup 2026 Qualifiers was hosted by Albania at Air Albania Stadium on 7 June. It ended in a 0-0 draw without significant incidents. Albanian forward Rey Manaj missed a penalty at the 45th minute as Serbian goaltender Đorđe Petrović made the save. The second match was held in Serbia at Dubočica Stadium, and ended in a 1-0 win for Albania after Rey Manaj scored the lone goal in the 45+1 minute. Manaj celebrated the goal with a double-headed eagle gesture which earned him a yellow card. The win gave Albania three vital points. Albania secured second place in the group in its subsequent match after beating Andorra 0-1 as visitors, thanks to a goal from Kristjan Asllani. The win secured a spot for Albania in the FIFA-play-offs with a total of 14 points. Meanwhile, Serbia finished in 3rd place with 13 Points.

=== Standings in Group K ===
Pos	Team	Pld	W	D	L	GF	GA	GD	Pts	Qualification
1	England	8	8	0	0	22	0	+22	24	Qualification for 2026 FIFA World Cup
2	Albania	8	4	2	2	7	5	+2	14	Advance to play-offs
3	Serbia	8	4	1	3	9	10	−1	13	
4	Latvia	8	1	2	5	5	15	−10	5	
5	Andorra	8	0	1	7	3	16	−13	1	

Source: FIFA, UEFA
Rules for classification: Tiebreakers

== Overall and matches ==
=== Overall ===
Competition	Round	Matches	Wins		Draws	Goals	
Competition	Round	Matches	Albania	Serbia	Draws	Albania	Serbia
FIFA World Cup	Competition	0	0	0	0	0	0
FIFA World Cup	Qualification Process	2	1	0	1	1	0
UEFA European Championship	Competition	0	0	0	0	0	0
UEFA European Championship	Qualification Process	2	1	1	0	3	2
Total		4	2	1	1	4	2

=== Matches ===
14 October 2014 UEFA Euro 2016 qualifying	Serbia	0–3	Albania	Belgrade, Serbia
20:45		Report		Stadium: Partizan Stadium; Attendance: 25,200; Referee: Martin Atkinson (England)

8 October 2015 UEFA Euro 2016 qualifying	Albania	0–2	Serbia	Elbasan, Albania
20:45		Report	Kolarov 90+1'; Ljajić 90+4'	Stadium: Elbasan Arena; Attendance: 12,330; Referee: Nicola Rizzoli (Italy)

7 June 2025 2026 FIFA World Cup qualifying	Albania	0–0	Serbia	Tirana, Albania
20:45		Report (FIFA); Report (UEFA)		Stadium: Arena Kombëtare

11 October 2025 2026 FIFA World Cup qualifying	Serbia	0–1	Albania	Leskovac, Serbia
20:45		Report (FIFA); Report (UEFA)	Rey Manaj 45+1'	Stadium: Dubočica Stadium
