= Martin Matoušek =

Czech operatic singer (1973-2026)

- Born: 21 February 1973
- Died: 8 July 2026 (aged 53)
- Occupation: Operatic singer

Martin Matoušek (21 February 1973 – 8 July 2026) was a Czech operatic baritone.
