= Mikkel Jensen (footballer, born 1995) =

Danish footballer

Personal information
- Full name: Mikkel Jensen
- Date of birth: 21 January 1995 (age 31)
- Place of birth: Holbæk, Denmark
- Height: 1.80 m (5 ft 11 in)
- Positions: Winger; forward

Team information
- Current team: RIF Fodbold
- Number: 18

Youth career
- –2013: Holbæk B&I
- 2010–2013: Brøndby
- 2013–2014: Nordsjælland

Senior career*
Years	Team	Apps	(Gls)
2014–2015	Nordsjælland	3	(0)
2014–2015	→ FC Roskilde (loan)	4	(0)
2015–2017	Næstved	56	(5)
2017–2023	Holbaek B&I		
2023–	RIF Fodbold		

International career
2010–2011	Denmark U-16	8	(0)
2010–2012	Denmark U-17	13	(2)
2012–2013	Denmark U-18	6	(0)
2013–2014	Denmark U-19	9	(0)
2013	Denmark U-20	3	(0)
- * Club domestic league appearances and goals as of 16 April 2017 (UTC)

Mikkel Jensen (born 21 January 1995) is a Danish footballer who plays for RIF Fodbold.

== Youth career ==
Jensen joined Brøndby IF from Holbæk B&I at the age of 16. At the end of November 2011, Jensen went on a trial with FC Bayern München. However, wasn't offered a contract and returned to Brøndby.

== Club career ==
=== FC Nordsjælland ===
In February 2013, he signed a contract with FC Nordsjælland. It was the idea, that he would start playing with the under-19 team.

Brøndby IF confirmed, that they had offered Jensen a contract extension, but the parts couldn't agree.

In the summer 2014, Jensen was one out of six under-19 players, who permanently was promoted in to the first team squad.

=== Loan to FC Roskilde ===
On 2 September 2014, Jensen was loaned out to Danish 1st Division club, FC Roskilde.

=== Næstved BK ===
On 8 July 2015, Jensen signed a two-year contract with newly promoted Danish 1st Division club Næstved Boldklub. Jensen got shirt number 12.

Jensen scored his first goal for Næstved on 2 August 2015, in a 1–2 defeat against FC Helsingør. He scored just before the half-break in the 45th minute to 1-1.

=== Holbæk B&I ===
On 16 July 2017, Jensen signed for his motherclub Holbæk B&I in the Denmark Series.

=== RIF Fodbold ===
After six seasons in Holbæk, Jensen moved to RIF Fodbold in July 2023, where his brother, Rasmus, also was playing.
