= Albania at the UEFA European Championship =

International football delegation

Albania have qualified twice for the UEFA European Championship — in 2016 and 2024. On both occasions, they directly qualified after securing a top two spot in their qualifying group. Euro 2016 was the side's first ever appearance at a major tournament finals. In both appearances so far, they failed to progress past the group stage. They also had an historical qualification attempt during the 1964 European Nations' Cup reaching their the round of 16 the reason being Albania got past the both leg's against Greece, for political reasons forfeited their two matches. In the Round of 16 Albania came on short against Denmark despite their second leg win At the end Albania ranked 9th in Europe.

== Euro 2016 ==
Manager: Gianni De Biasi

Albania named their final squad on 31 May.

No.	Pos.	Player	Date of birth (age)	Caps	Goals	Club
1	GK	Etrit Berisha	10 March 1989 (aged 27)	35	0	(Italian Football Federation) Lazio
2	DF	Andi Lila	12 February 1986 (aged 30)	58	0	(Hellenic Football Federation) PAS Giannina
3	MF	Ermir Lenjani	5 August 1989 (aged 26)	19	3	(French Football Federation) Nantes
4	DF	Elseid Hysaj	2 February 1994 (aged 22)	20	0	(Italian Football Federation) Napoli
5	DF	Lorik Cana (captain)	27 June 1983 (aged 32)	91	1	(French Football Federation) Nantes
6	DF	Frédéric Veseli	20 November 1992 (aged 23)	3	0	(Swiss Football Association) Lugano
7	DF	Ansi Agolli	11 November 1982 (aged 33)	61	2	(Association of Football Federations of Azerbaijan) Qarabağ
8	MF	Migjen Basha	5 January 1987 (aged 29)	19	3	(Italian Football Federation) Como
9	MF	Ledian Memushaj	7 December 1986 (aged 29)	14	0	(Italian Football Federation) Pescara
10	FW	Armando Sadiku	27 May 1991 (aged 25)	20	5	(Liechtenstein Football Association) Vaduz
11	FW	Shkëlzen Gashi	15 July 1988 (aged 27)	14	1	(United States Soccer Federation) Colorado Rapids
12	GK	Orges Shehi	25 September 1977 (aged 38)	7	0	(Albanian Football Federation) Skënderbeu Korçë
13	MF	Burim Kukeli	16 January 1984 (aged 32)	15	0	(Swiss Football Association) Zürich
14	MF	Taulant Xhaka	28 March 1991 (aged 25)	12	0	(Swiss Football Association) Basel
15	DF	Mërgim Mavraj	9 June 1986 (aged 30)	26	3	(German Football Association) 1. FC Köln
16	FW	Sokol Cikalleshi	27 July 1990 (aged 25)	19	2	(Turkish Football Federation) İstanbul Başakşehir
17	DF	Naser Aliji	27 December 1993 (aged 22)	5	0	(Swiss Football Association) Basel
18	DF	Arlind Ajeti	25 September 1993 (aged 22)	10	1	(Italian Football Federation) Frosinone
19	FW	Bekim Balaj	11 January 1991 (aged 25)	15	1	(Croatian Football Federation) Rijeka
20	MF	Ergys Kaçe	8 July 1993 (aged 22)	16	2	(Hellenic Football Federation) PAOK
21	MF	Odise Roshi	21 May 1991 (aged 25)	32	1	(Croatian Football Federation) Rijeka
22	MF	Amir Abrashi	27 March 1990 (aged 26)	18	0	(German Football Association) SC Freiburg
23	GK	Alban Hoxha	23 November 1987 (aged 28)	1	0	(Albanian Football Federation) Partizani

=== Group stage ===
Pos	Team	Pld	W	D	L	GF	GA	GD	Pts	Qualification
1	France (H)	3	2	1	0	4	1	+3	7	Advance to knockout stage
2	Switzerland	3	1	2	0	2	1	+1	5	Advance to knockout stage
3	Albania	3	1	0	2	1	3	−2	3	
4	Romania	3	0	1	2	2	4	−2	1	

Source: UEFA
Rules for classification: Group stage tiebreakers
(H) Hosts
11 June 2016
15:00

Albania	0–1	Switzerland
	Report	Schär 5'

Stade Bollaert-Delelis, Lens
Attendance: 33,805
Referee: Carlos Velasco Carballo (Spain)

15 June 2016
21:00

France	2–0	Albania
Griezmann 90'; Payet 90+6'	Report

Stade Vélodrome, Marseille
Attendance: 63,670
Referee: Willie Collum (Scotland)

19 June 2016
21:00

Romania	0–1	Albania
	Report	Sadiku 43'

Parc Olympique Lyonnais, Décines-Charpieu
Attendance: 49,752
Referee: Pavel Královec (Czech Republic)

Ranking of third-placed teams

Pos	Grp	Team	Pld	W	D	L	GF	GA	GD	Pts	Qualification
1	B	Slovakia	3	1	1	1	3	3	0	4	Advance to knockout stage
2	E	Republic of Ireland	3	1	1	1	2	4	−2	4	Advance to knockout stage
3	F	Portugal	3	0	3	0	4	4	0	3	Advance to knockout stage
4	C	Northern Ireland	3	1	0	2	2	2	0	3	Advance to knockout stage
5	D	Turkey	3	1	0	2	2	4	−2	3	
6	A	Albania	3	1	0	2	1	3	−2	3	

Source: UEFA
Rules for classification: 1) Higher number of points obtained; 2) Superior goal difference; 3) Higher number of goals scored; 4) Fair play conduct; 5) Position in the UEFA national team coefficient ranking system.

== Euro 2024 ==
=== Albania ===
Manager: (Brazil) Sylvinho

Albania announced a squad of 27 players on 27 May 2024. The final 26-man squad was officially announced on 8 June, with goalkeeper Simon Simoni being left out.

No.	Pos.	Player	Date of birth (age)	Caps	Goals	Club
1	GK	Etrit Berisha	10 March 1989 (aged 35)	81	0	(Italian Football Federation) Empoli
2	DF	Iván Balliu	1 January 1992 (aged 32)	13	0	(Royal Spanish Football Federation) Rayo Vallecano
3	DF	Mario Mitaj	6 August 2003 (aged 20)	14	0	(Russian Football Union) Lokomotiv Moscow
4	DF	Elseid Hysaj	2 February 1994 (aged 30)	84	2	(Italian Football Federation) Lazio
5	DF	Arlind Ajeti	25 September 1993 (aged 30)	26	1	(Romanian Football Federation) CFR Cluj
6	DF	Berat Djimsiti (captain)	19 February 1993 (aged 31)	58	1	(Italian Football Federation) Atalanta
7	FW	Rey Manaj	24 February 1997 (aged 27)	34	8	(Turkish Football Federation) Sivasspor
8	MF	Klaus Gjasula	14 December 1989 (aged 34)	28	0	(German Football Association) Darmstadt 98
9	FW	Jasir Asani	19 May 1995 (aged 29)	13	4	(Korea Football Association) Gwangju
10	MF	Nedim Bajrami	28 February 1999 (aged 25)	23	4	(Italian Football Federation) Sassuolo
11	FW	Armando Broja	10 September 2001 (aged 22)	21	5	(The Football Association) Fulham
12	GK	Elhan Kastrati	2 February 1997 (aged 27)	2	0	(Italian Football Federation) Cittadella
13	DF	Enea Mihaj	5 July 1998 (aged 25)	19	0	(Portuguese Football Federation) Famalicão
14	MF	Qazim Laçi	19 January 1996 (aged 28)	27	3	(Football Association of the Czech Republic) Sparta Prague
15	MF	Taulant Seferi	15 November 1996 (aged 27)	19	3	(United Arab Emirates Football Association) Baniyas
16	FW	Medon Berisha	21 October 2003 (aged 20)	1	0	(Italian Football Federation) Lecce
17	FW	Ernest Muçi	19 March 2001 (aged 23)	10	3	(Turkish Football Federation) Beşiktaş
18	DF	Ardian Ismajli	30 September 1996 (aged 27)	38	2	(Italian Football Federation) Empoli
19	FW	Mirlind Daku	1 January 1998 (aged 26)	5	1	(Russian Football Union) Rubin Kazan
20	MF	Ylber Ramadani	12 April 1996 (aged 28)	35	1	(Italian Football Federation) Lecce
21	MF	Kristjan Asllani	9 March 2002 (aged 22)	20	2	(Italian Football Federation) Inter Milan
22	MF	Amir Abrashi	27 March 1990 (aged 34)	50	1	(Swiss Football Association) Grasshoppers
23	GK	Thomas Strakosha	19 March 1995 (aged 29)	28	0	(The Football Association) Brentford
24	DF	Marash Kumbulla	8 February 2000 (aged 24)	19	0	(Italian Football Federation) Sassuolo
25	DF	Naser Aliji	27 December 1993 (aged 30)	14	0	(Romanian Football Federation) Voluntari
26	FW	Arbër Hoxha	6 October 1998 (aged 25)	4	0	(Croatian Football Federation) Dinamo Zagreb

=== Group stage ===
Pos	Team	Pld	W	D	L	GF	GA	GD	Pts	Qualification
1	Spain	3	3	0	0	5	0	+5	9	Advance to knockout stage
2	Italy	3	1	1	1	3	3	0	4	Advance to knockout stage
3	Croatia	3	0	2	1	3	6	−3	2	
4	Albania	3	0	1	2	3	5	−2	1	

Source: UEFA
15 June 2024
21:00

Italy	2–1	Albania
Bastoni 11'; Barella 16'	Report	Bajrami 1'

Westfalenstadion, Dortmund
Attendance: 60,512
Referee: Felix Zwayer (Germany)

19 June 2024
15:00

Croatia	2–2	Albania
Kramarić 74'; Gjasula 76' (o.g.)	Report	Laçi 11'; Gjasula 90+5'

Volksparkstadion, Hamburg
Attendance: 46,784
Referee: François Letexier (France)

24 June 2024
21:00

Albania	0–1	Spain
	Report	Torres 13'

Merkur Spiel-Arena, Düsseldorf
Attendance: 46,586
Referee: Glenn Nyberg (Sweden)

== Overall record ==
UEFA European Championship record										Qualification record							
Year	Round	Position	Pld	W	D	L	GF	GA	Squad	Campaign	Position	Pld	W	D	L	GF	GA
(France) 1960	Did not enter									Did not enter							
(Spain) 1964	Did not qualify									1964	Round of 16	4	3	0	1	7	4
(Italy) 1968	Did not qualify									1968	3rd	4	0	1	3	0	12
(Belgium) 1972	Did not qualify									1972	4th	6	1	1	4	5	9
(Socialist Federal Republic of Yugoslavia) 1976	Did not enter									Did not enter							
(Italy) 1980	Did not enter									Did not enter							
(France) 1984	Did not qualify									1984	5th	8	0	2	6	4	14
(West Germany) 1988	Did not qualify									1988	4th	6	0	0	6	2	17
(Sweden) 1992	Did not qualify									1992	5th	7	1	0	6	2	21
(England) 1996	Did not qualify									1996	6th	10	2	2	6	10	16
(Belgium) (Netherlands) 2000	Did not qualify									2000	5th	10	1	4	5	8	14
(Portugal) 2004	Did not qualify									2004	4th	8	2	2	4	11	15
(Austria) (Switzerland) 2008	Did not qualify									2008	5th	12	2	5	5	12	18
(Poland) (Ukraine) 2012	Did not qualify									2012	5th	10	2	3	5	7	14
(France) 2016	Group stage	18th	3	1	0	2	1	3	Squad	2016	2nd	8	4	2	2	10	5
(Europe) 2020	Did not qualify									2020	4th	10	4	1	5	16	14
(Germany) 2024	Group stage	21st	3	0	1	2	3	5	Squad	2024	1st	8	4	3	1	12	4
(United Kingdom) (Republic of Ireland) 2028	To be determined									To be determined							
(Italy) (Turkey) 2032	To be determined									To be determined							
Total	Best: Group stage	2/17	6	1	1	4	4	8	—	Total	14/17	111	26	26	59	100	177

Albania's European Championship record
First match	Albania 0–1 Switzerland (Stade Bollaert-Delelis, Lens, France; 11 June 2016)
Biggest win	Romania 0–1 Albania (Parc Olympique Lyonnais, Lyon, France; 19 June 2016)
Biggest defeat	France 2–0 Albania (Stade Vélodrome, Marseille, France; 15 June 2016)
Best result	Group stage (2016, 2024)
Worst result	Group stage (2016, 2024)

== Head-to-head record ==
Opponent	Pld	W	D	L	GF	GA	GD	Win %
Croatia	1	0	1	0	2	2	+0	0.00
France	1	0	0	1	0	2	−2	0.00
Italy	1	0	0	1	1	2	−1	0.00
Romania	1	1	0	0	1	0	+1	100.00
Spain	1	0	0	1	0	1	−1	0.00
Switzerland	1	0	0	1	0	1	−1	0.00
Total	6	1	1	4	4	8	−4	16.67
