= UEFA Euro 2024 Group B =

Football tournament group stage

Group B of UEFA Euro 2024 took place from 15 to 24 June 2024. The group contained Spain, Croatia, defending champions Italy, and Albania. Spain, Italy, and Croatia were drawn together in Group C of the UEFA Euro 2012, and just like 2012, Croatia would go out in the group stage while Spain would go on to win the tournament. The Group was considered the tournament's Group of Death due Italy, Spain, and Croatia being in the Top 10 of the FIFA Rankings heading into the tournament.

== Teams ==
Draw position	Team	Pot	Method of qualification	Date of qualification	Finals appearance	Last appearance	Previous best performance	Qualifying Rankings November 2023 (Note: The European Qualifiers overall rankings from November 2023 were used for seeding for the final draw.)	FIFA Rankings April 2024
B1	Spain	1	Group A winner	15 October 2023	12th	2020	Winners (1964, 2008, 2012)	3	8
B2	Croatia	3	Group D runner-up	21 November 2023	7th	2020	Quarter-finals (1996, 2008)	14	10
B3	Italy	4	Group C runner-up	20 November 2023	11th	2020	Winners (1968, 2020)	18	9
B4	Albania	2	Group E winner	17 November 2023	2nd	2016	Group stage (2016)	10	66

== Standings ==
Pos	Team	Pld	W	D	L	GF	GA	GD	Pts	Qualification
1	Spain	3	3	0	0	5	0	+5	9	Advance to knockout stage
2	Italy	3	1	1	1	3	3	0	4	Advance to knockout stage
3	Croatia	3	0	2	1	3	6	−3	2	
4	Albania	3	0	1	2	3	5	−2	1	

Source: UEFA
Rules for classification: Group stage tiebreakers

In the round of 16,

- The winner of Group B, Spain, advanced to play the third-placed team of Group F, Georgia.
- The runner-up of Group B, Italy, advanced to play the runner-up of Group A, Switzerland.

== Matches ==
=== Spain vs Croatia ===
Both teams previously met in the 2023 UEFA Nations League final, which Spain won on penalties. With his start, Spain's Lamine Yamal became the youngest player to make an appearance in the UEFA European Championship final tournament.

15 June 2024
18:00

Spain	3–0	Croatia
Morata 29'; Fabián 32'; Carvajal 45+2'	Report

Olympiastadion, Berlin
Attendance: 68,844
Referee: Michael Oliver (England)

Spain	Croatia

GK	23	Unai Simón
RB	2	Dani Carvajal
CB	3	Robin Le Normand
CB	4	Nacho
LB	24	Marc Cucurella
CM	20	Pedri		(substituted off) 59'
CM	16	Rodri	(yellow card) 78'	(substituted off) 86'
CM	8	Fabián Ruiz
RF	19	Lamine Yamal		(substituted off) 86'
CF	7	Álvaro Morata (c)		(substituted off) 67'
LF	17	Nico Williams		(substituted off) 67'
Substitutions:
FW	10	Dani Olmo		(substituted on) 59'
FW	21	Mikel Oyarzabal		(substituted on) 67'
MF	6	Mikel Merino		(substituted on) 67'
MF	18	Martín Zubimendi		(substituted on) 86'
FW	11	Ferran Torres		(substituted on) 86'
Manager:
Luis de la Fuente

GK	1	Dominik Livaković
RB	2	Josip Stanišić
CB	6	Josip Šutalo
CB	3	Marin Pongračić
LB	4	Joško Gvardiol
CM	10	Luka Modrić (c)	(substituted off) 65'
CM	11	Marcelo Brozović
CM	8	Mateo Kovačić	(substituted off) 65'
RW	7	Lovro Majer
LW	9	Andrej Kramarić	(substituted off) 72'
CF	16	Ante Budimir	(substituted off) 56'
Substitutions:
MF	14	Ivan Perišić	(substituted on) 56'
MF	15	Mario Pašalić	(substituted on) 65'
MF	25	Luka Sučić	(substituted on) 65'
FW	17	Bruno Petković	(substituted on) 72'
Manager:
Zlatko Dalić

Man of the Match:
Fabián Ruiz (Spain)

Assistant referees:
Stuart Burt (England)
Dan Cook (England)
Fourth official:
Anthony Taylor (England)
Reserve assistant referee:
Gary Beswick (England)
Video assistant referee:
Stuart Attwell (England)
Assistant video assistant referees:
David Coote (England)
Pol van Boekel (Netherlands)

=== Italy vs Albania ===
Nedim Bajrami scored for Albania after 23 seconds, netting the fastest goal in the UEFA European Championship history.

15 June 2024
21:00

Italy	2–1	Albania
Bastoni 11'; Barella 16'	Report	Bajrami 1'

Westfalenstadion, Dortmund
Attendance: 60,512
Referee: Felix Zwayer (Germany)

Italy	Albania

GK	1	Gianluigi Donnarumma (c)
RB	2	Giovanni Di Lorenzo
CB	23	Alessandro Bastoni
CB	5	Riccardo Calafiori	(yellow card) 51'
LB	3	Federico Dimarco		(substituted off) 83'
CM	8	Jorginho
CM	18	Nicolò Barella		(substituted off) 90+2'
RW	7	Davide Frattesi
AM	10	Lorenzo Pellegrini	(yellow card) 21'	(substituted off) 77'
LW	14	Federico Chiesa		(substituted off) 77'
CF	9	Gianluca Scamacca		(substituted off) 83'
Substitutions:
MF	16	Bryan Cristante		(substituted on) 77'
DF	24	Andrea Cambiaso		(substituted on) 77'
FW	19	Mateo Retegui		(substituted on) 83'
DF	13	Matteo Darmian		(substituted on) 83'
FW	25	Michael Folorunsho		(substituted on) 90+2'
Manager:
Luciano Spalletti

GK	23	Thomas Strakosha
RB	4	Elseid Hysaj
CB	6	Berat Djimsiti (c)
CB	5	Arlind Ajeti
LB	3	Mario Mitaj
CM	21	Kristjan Asllani
CM	20	Ylber Ramadani
CM	10	Nedim Bajrami		(substituted off) 87'
RF	9	Jasir Asani		(substituted off) 68'
CF	11	Armando Broja	(yellow card) 51'	(substituted off) 77'
LF	15	Taulant Seferi		(substituted off) 68'
Substitutions:
FW	26	Arbër Hoxha	(yellow card) 74'	(substituted on) 68'
MF	14	Qazim Laçi		(substituted on) 68'
FW	7	Rey Manaj		(substituted on) 77'
FW	17	Ernest Muçi		(substituted on) 87'
Manager:
(Brazil) Sylvinho

Man of the Match:
Federico Chiesa (Italy)

Assistant referees:
Stefan Lupp (Germany)
Marco Achmüller (Germany)
Fourth official:
Daniel Siebert (Germany)
Reserve assistant referee:
Jan Seidel (Germany)
Video assistant referee:
Bastian Dankert (Germany)
Assistant video assistant referees:
Christian Dingert (Germany)
Rob Dieperink (Netherlands)

=== Croatia vs Albania ===
19 June 2024
15:00

Croatia	2–2	Albania
Kramarić 74'; Gjasula 76' (o.g.)	Report	Laçi 11'; Gjasula 90+5'

Volksparkstadion, Hamburg
Attendance: 46,784
Referee: François Letexier (France)

Croatia	Albania

GK	1	Dominik Livaković
RB	22	Josip Juranović
CB	6	Josip Šutalo
CB	4	Joško Gvardiol
LB	14	Ivan Perišić		(substituted off) 84'
CM	10	Luka Modrić (c)
CM	11	Marcelo Brozović		(substituted off) 46'
CM	8	Mateo Kovačić
RF	7	Lovro Majer		(substituted off) 46'
CF	17	Bruno Petković		(substituted off) 69'
LF	9	Andrej Kramarić		(substituted off) 84'
Substitutions:
MF	25	Luka Sučić		(substituted on) 46'
MF	15	Mario Pašalić		(substituted on) 46'
FW	16	Ante Budimir		(substituted on) 69'
DF	19	Borna Sosa		(substituted on) 84'
MF	26	Martin Baturina		(substituted on) 84'
Other disciplinary actions:
TS	—	Vedran Ćorluka	(yellow card) 65'
GK	23	Ivica Ivušić	(yellow card) 87'
Manager:
Zlatko Dalić

GK	23	Thomas Strakosha
RB	4	Elseid Hysaj	(yellow card) 77'
CB	6	Berat Djimsiti (c)
CB	5	Arlind Ajeti
LB	3	Mario Mitaj
CM	21	Kristjan Asllani
CM	20	Ylber Ramadani		(substituted off) 85'
CM	14	Qazim Laçi		(substituted off) 72'
RF	9	Jasir Asani		(substituted off) 64'
CF	7	Rey Manaj		(substituted off) 85'
LF	10	Nedim Bajrami
Substitutions:
FW	15	Taulant Seferi		(substituted on) 64'
MF	8	Klaus Gjasula	(yellow card) 90+7'	(substituted on) 72'
FW	26	Arbër Hoxha		(substituted on) 85'
FW	19	Mirlind Daku	(yellow card) 90+3'	(substituted on) 85'
Manager:
(Brazil) Sylvinho

Man of the Match:
Andrej Kramarić (Croatia)

Assistant referees:
Cyril Mugnier (France)
Mehdi Rahmouni (France)
Fourth official:
Sandro Schärer (Switzerland)
Reserve assistant referee:
Stéphane de Almeida (Switzerland)
Video assistant referee:
Willy Delajod (France)
Assistant video assistant referees:
Jérôme Brisard (France)
Bastian Dankert (Germany)

=== Spain vs Italy ===
Italy and Spain faced each other in a fifth consecutive European Championships. Their most notable clash was Spain's 4–0 victory in the UEFA Euro 2012 final.

20 June 2024
21:00

Spain	1–0	Italy
Calafiori 55' (o.g.)	Report

Arena AufSchalke, Gelsenkirchen
Attendance: 49,528
Referee: Slavko Vinčić (Slovenia)

Spain	Italy

GK	23	Unai Simón
RB	2	Dani Carvajal	(yellow card) 90+6'
CB	3	Robin Le Normand	(yellow card) 69'
CB	14	Aymeric Laporte
LB	24	Marc Cucurella
CM	20	Pedri		(substituted off) 71'
CM	16	Rodri	(yellow card) 45+1'
CM	8	Fabián Ruiz		(substituted off) 90+4'
RF	19	Lamine Yamal		(substituted off) 71'
CF	7	Álvaro Morata (c)		(substituted off) 78'
LF	17	Nico Williams		(substituted off) 78'
Substitutions:
MF	15	Álex Baena		(substituted on) 71'
FW	11	Ferran Torres		(substituted on) 71'
FW	21	Mikel Oyarzabal		(substituted on) 78'
FW	26	Ayoze Pérez		(substituted on) 78'
MF	6	Mikel Merino		(substituted on) 90+4'
Manager:
Luis de la Fuente

GK	1	Gianluigi Donnarumma (c)	(yellow card) 15'
RB	2	Giovanni Di Lorenzo
CB	23	Alessandro Bastoni
CB	5	Riccardo Calafiori
LB	3	Federico Dimarco
CM	18	Nicolò Barella
CM	8	Jorginho		(substituted off) 46'
RW	7	Davide Frattesi		(substituted off) 46'
AM	10	Lorenzo Pellegrini		(substituted off) 82'
LW	14	Federico Chiesa		(substituted off) 64'
CF	9	Gianluca Scamacca		(substituted off) 64'
Substitutions:
DF	24	Andrea Cambiaso		(substituted on) 46'
MF	16	Bryan Cristante	(yellow card) 46'	(substituted on) 46'
FW	20	Mattia Zaccagni		(substituted on) 64'
FW	19	Mateo Retegui		(substituted on) 64'
FW	11	Giacomo Raspadori		(substituted on) 82'
Manager:
Luciano Spalletti

Man of the Match:
Nico Williams (Spain)

Assistant referees:
Tomaž Klančnik (Slovenia)
Andraž Kovačič (Slovenia)
Fourth official:
Clément Turpin (France)
Reserve assistant referee:
Nicolas Danos (France)
Video assistant referee:
Nejc Kajtazovič (Slovenia)
Assistant video assistant referees:
Bartosz Frankowski (Poland)
Tomasz Kwiatkowski (Poland)

=== Albania vs Spain ===
24 June 2024
21:00

Albania	0–1	Spain
	Report	Torres 13'

Merkur Spiel-Arena, Düsseldorf
Attendance: 46,586
Referee: Glenn Nyberg (Sweden)

Albania	Spain

GK	23	Thomas Strakosha
RB	2	Iván Balliu
CB	6	Berat Djimsiti (c)
CB	5	Arlind Ajeti
LB	3	Mario Mitaj
CM	20	Ylber Ramadani
CM	21	Kristjan Asllani
RW	9	Jasir Asani		(substituted off) 82'
AM	14	Qazim Laçi		(substituted off) 71'
LW	10	Nedim Bajrami	(yellow card) 66'	(substituted off) 71'
CF	7	Rey Manaj		(substituted off) 58'
Substitutions:
FW	11	Armando Broja		(substituted on) 58'
FW	16	Medon Berisha	(yellow card) 89'	(substituted on) 71'
FW	26	Arbër Hoxha		(substituted on) 71'
FW	17	Ernest Muçi		(substituted on) 82'
Other disciplinary actions:
TS	—	Ervin Bulku (Note: While sources initially indicated that Albania manager Sylvinho was shown a yellow card, replays indicated that the card was instead given to his assistant manager Ervin Bulku.)	(yellow card) 52'
Manager:
(Brazil) Sylvinho

GK	1	David Raya
RB	22	Jesús Navas (c)
CB	5	Daniel Vivian	(yellow card) 90'
CB	14	Aymeric Laporte		(substituted off) 46'
LB	12	Álex Grimaldo
CM	18	Martín Zubimendi
CM	6	Mikel Merino
RW	11	Ferran Torres		(substituted off) 71'
AM	10	Dani Olmo		(substituted off) 84'
LW	21	Mikel Oyarzabal		(substituted off) 62'
CF	9	Joselu		(substituted off) 71'
Substitutions:
DF	3	Robin Le Normand		(substituted on) 46'
FW	25	Fermín López		(substituted on) 62'
FW	19	Lamine Yamal		(substituted on) 71'
FW	7	Álvaro Morata		(substituted on) 71'
MF	15	Álex Baena		(substituted on) 84'
Manager:
Luis de la Fuente

Man of the Match:
Ferran Torres (Spain)

Assistant referees:
Mahbod Beigi (Sweden)
Andreas Söderkvist (Sweden)
Fourth official:
Mykola Balakin (Ukraine)
Reserve assistant referee:
Oleksandr Berkut (Ukraine)
Video assistant referee:
Christian Dingert (Germany)
Assistant video assistant referees:
David Coote (England)
Marco Fritz (Germany)

=== Croatia vs Italy ===
With his goal, Croatia's Luka Modrić became the oldest goalscorer in the UEFA European Championship final tournament. However, the draw caused Croatia to finish last among the four best-ranked third-placed teams, eliminating them. This was the first time Croatia had failed to advance to the knockout stage of the Euros since Euro 2012 and in any major international football tournament since the 2014 World Cup.

24 June 2024
21:00

Croatia	1–1	Italy
Modrić 55'	Report	Zaccagni 90+8'

Red Bull Arena, Leipzig
Attendance: 38,322
Referee: Danny Makkelie (Netherlands)

Croatia	Italy

GK	1	Dominik Livaković
RB	2	Josip Stanišić	(yellow card) 82'
CB	6	Josip Šutalo
CB	3	Marin Pongračić	(yellow card) 78'
LB	4	Joško Gvardiol
CM	10	Luka Modrić (c)	(yellow card) 60'	(substituted off) 80'
CM	11	Marcelo Brozović	(yellow card) 90+1'
CM	8	Mateo Kovačić		(substituted off) 70'
RF	25	Luka Sučić	(yellow card) 24'	(substituted off) 70'
CF	9	Andrej Kramarić		(substituted off) 90'
LF	15	Mario Pašalić		(substituted off) 46'
Substitutions:
FW	16	Ante Budimir		(substituted on) 46'
MF	14	Ivan Perišić		(substituted on) 70'
MF	18	Luka Ivanušec	(yellow card) 73'	(substituted on) 70'
MF	7	Lovro Majer		(substituted on) 80'
DF	22	Josip Juranović		(substituted on) 90'
Manager:
Zlatko Dalić

GK	1	Gianluigi Donnarumma (c)
RB	2	Giovanni Di Lorenzo
CB	23	Alessandro Bastoni
CB	5	Riccardo Calafiori	(yellow card) 90+3'
LB	13	Matteo Darmian		(substituted off) 81'
CM	18	Nicolò Barella
CM	8	Jorginho		(substituted off) 81'
RW	11	Giacomo Raspadori		(substituted off) 75'
AM	10	Lorenzo Pellegrini		(substituted off) 46'
LW	3	Federico Dimarco		(substituted off) 57'
CF	19	Mateo Retegui
Substitutions:
MF	7	Davide Frattesi		(substituted on) 46'
FW	14	Federico Chiesa		(substituted on) 57'
FW	9	Gianluca Scamacca		(substituted on) 75'
MF	20	Mattia Zaccagni		(substituted on) 81'
MF	21	Nicolò Fagioli	(yellow card) 90+6'	(substituted on) 81'
Manager:
Luciano Spalletti			(yellow card) 90+10'

Man of the Match:
Luka Modrić (Croatia)

Assistant referees:
Hessel Steegstra (Netherlands)
Jan de Vries (Netherlands)
Fourth official:
Serdar Gözübüyük (Netherlands)
Reserve assistant referee:
Johan Balder (Netherlands)
Video assistant referee:
Rob Dieperink (Netherlands)
Assistant video assistant referees:
Pol van Boekel (Netherlands)
Bastian Dankert (Germany)

== Discipline ==
Fair play points would have been used as a tiebreaker if the head-to-head and overall records of teams had been tied (and if a penalty shoot-out was not applicable as a tiebreaker). These were calculated based on yellow and red cards received by players and team officials in all group matches as follows:

- yellow card = 1 point
- red card as a result of two yellow cards = 3 points
- direct red card = 3 points
- yellow card followed by direct red card = 4 points

Only one of the above deductions was applied to a player or team official in a single match.

Team	Match 1				Match 2				Match 3				Points
Team	Booked	(yellow card) (yellow-red card)	Sent off (straight red)	(yellow card) (red card)	Booked	(yellow card) (yellow-red card)	Sent off (straight red)	(yellow card) (red card)	Booked	(yellow card) (yellow-red card)	Sent off (straight red)	(yellow card) (red card)	Points
Spain	1				3				1				−5
Italy	2				2				3				−7
Albania	2				3				3 (Note: Count includes a card from a technical staff member of the team)				−8
Croatia					2				6				−8

== See also ==
- Albania at the UEFA European Championship
- Croatia at the UEFA European Championship
- Italy at the UEFA European Championship
- Spain at the UEFA European Championship
