= Ervin Bulku =

Albanian footballer and coach

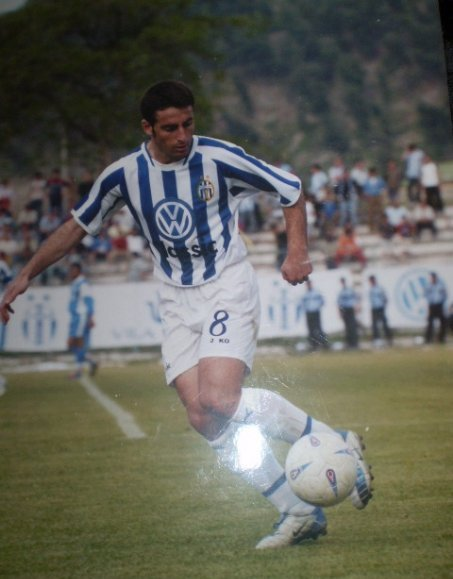
- Ervin Bulku with KF Tirana against KF Elbasani in October 2005

Personal information
- Date of birth: 3 March 1981 (age 45)
- Place of birth: Tirana, PSR Albania
- Height: 1.83 m (6 ft 0 in)
- Positions: Defensive midfielder; central midfielder; right midfielder

Youth career
- 1998: Tirana

Senior career*
Years	Team	Apps	(Gls)
1998–2007	Tirana	201	(14)
2007–2010	Kryvbas Kryvyi Rih	58	(2)
2010–2011	Hajduk Split	15	(0)
2011–2012	AZAL Baku	22	(3)
2012–2014	Sepahan	47	(1)
2014–2016	Tirana	32	(1)
Total		375	(21)

International career
1998–1999	Albania U18	6	(1)
2000–2003	Albania U21	15	(1)
2002–2015	Albania	56	(1)

Managerial career
- 2015–: Albania (assistant)
- 2019: → Albania (caretaker)
- 2019–2020: → Shkëndija Tiranë U19
- 2021–2023: → Albania U17
- 2021: → Albania U16
- 2023–2024: → Albania U19
- * Club domestic league appearances and goals

Ervin Bulku (Albanian pronunciation: [ɛɾvin ˈbulku]; born 3 March 1981) is an Albanian former professional footballer and current assistant coach of the Albania national team.

He was a utility player capable of operating as a defensive midfielder, central midfielder and right midfielder. Bulku began his senior career with Tirana in 1998, where he established himself as one of the club's key players during one of its most successful periods, winning six Kategoria Superiore titles and four Albanian Cup trophies, including a domestic double in his debut season, as well as five Albanian Supercup titles. After nearly a decade with Tirana, he continued his career abroad with Kryvbas in Ukraine, Hajduk Split in Croatia, AZAL in Azerbaijan, and Sepahan in Iran, where he won the 2012–13 Hazfi Cup. He later returned to Tirana in 2014 and retired at the club in 2016.

At international level, Bulku represented Albania at under-18 and under-21 levels before making his senior debut in 2002. He earned 56 caps and scored one goal for the Albania national team over a thirteen-year international career.

== Club career ==
=== KF Tirana ===
Bulku progressed through the Tirana youth system and was promoted to the first team by coach Sulejman Mema ahead of the 1998–99 season, during which he made 13 league appearances as Tirana won both the Albanian National Championship and the Albanian Cup, completing a domestic double.

In the 1999–2000 season, Bulku became a regular member of the first team following the departure of several midfielders, earning increased playing time under manager Shkëlqim Muça. He made his European debut on 13 July 1999, coming on as a 78th-minute substitute in a 1–0 defeat to ÍBV in the UEFA Champions League first qualifying round. He made 21 appearances in the National Championship as Tirana retained the league title. Tirana and Tomori Berat finished level on 52 points at the end of the regular season, leading to a championship play-off final on 28 May 2000, in which Bulku started and played 57 minutes before being substituted with the score level at 0–0, as Tirana eventually won 5–4 on penalties following a 1–1 draw. He also featured in the 2000 Albanian Supercup, appearing during the final five minutes against Teuta on 13 January 2001, as Tirana won 1–0 to secure the trophy.

In the 2000–01 campaign, injury problems limited Bulku's playing time, restricting him to 12 league appearances as Tirana finished runners-up in the championship. He scored his first goal for the club on 9 September 2000 in a 9–0 victory over Kastrioti in the second leg of the Albanian Cup first round. He was an unused substitute in the final on 26 May 2001, as Tirana defeated Teuta 5–0 to win the competition. In the 2001 Albanian Supercup, he started against Vllaznia on 15 September 2001 and played 55 minutes before being substituted with Tirana trailing 1–0, as the match ended in a 2–1 defeat.

Bulku began the 2001–02 season by scoring in a 3–0 victory over Laçi in the second leg of the Albanian Cup first round on 24 August 2001, helping Tirana secure a 6–0 aggregate win and progress to the next round. On 26 October 2001, he scored his first National Championship goal in a 2–1 victory over Lushnja, giving Tirana the lead in the 22nd minute after his shot deflected off a defender into the net. He added his second goal of the cup campaign on 9 February 2002, scoring a 89th-minute winner in a 1–0 away victory over Erzeni in the first leg of the quarter-finals, before Tirana advanced with a 4–1 aggregate win after taking the second leg 3–1 a week later. On 11 May 2002, Bulku scored his second league goal, opening the scoring in a 2–2 draw against Dinamo Tirana. He finished the league season with 22 appearances and two goals as Tirana finished runners-up on 62 points, one behind Dinamo Tirana. In the Albanian Cup final on 1 June 2002, he played the full 90 minutes as Tirana defeated Dinamo Tirana 1–0 to win the trophy. He also started the 2002 Albanian Supercup against Dinamo Tirana, scoring in the first half before being substituted after 49 minutes in a 6–0 victory.

In the 2002–03 season, Bulku became one of Tirana's designated penalty takers, converting from the spot in the seventh minute of a 1–0 away victory over Flamurtari on 19 October 2002 in Round 4 of the National Championship. He made 22 league appearances as Tirana won the championship title. In the second round of the 2002–03 Albanian Cup, he converted another penalty in the 76th minute of the second leg against Besa on 30 January 2003, securing a 1–0 victory and progression to the quarter-finals with a 1–0 aggregate score. In the semi-finals, Bulku played the full 90 minutes in both legs against Dinamo Tirana, receiving a booking in each match, as Tirana lost 4–1 on aggregate and were eliminated. Suspended for an accumulation of bookings, he missed the 2003 Albanian Supercup on 16 August 2003, which Tirana won 3–0 against Dinamo Tirana.

In the 2003–04 Kategoria Superiore, Bulku made 24 appearances and scored two goals as Tirana secured a second consecutive league title, finishing nine points ahead of the runners-up with 80 points while scoring a record 90 goals during the campaign. On 15 August 2004, he played the full 90 minutes in the 2004 Albanian Supercup, as Tirana lost 2–0 to Partizani.

On 13 November 2004, Bulku scored twice, including a penalty, in a 3–1 victory over Egnatia in Round 11 of the 2004–05 Kategoria Superiore, finding the net in the 80th and 90+4th minutes. He scored again against the same opponents in Round 20 on 22 January 2005, converting an 81st-minute penalty to secure a 1–0 away victory. On 16 April 2005, he converted another penalty in an eventual 2–2 draw against Vllaznia, equalising in the 83rd minute after Tirana had trailed 2–1. He finished the league season with seven goals in 33 appearances, including four penalties, as Tirana won a third consecutive championship title with 84 points. In the Albanian Cup, Bulku scored once in the third round before playing the full 120 minutes in the final against Teuta on 11 May 2005, which ended goalless after extra time; he converted Tirana's opening penalty in the shoot-out, although the club was ultimately defeated 6–5. He played the first half of the 2005 Albanian Supercup against Teuta on 21 August 2005 before being substituted, as Tirana won 5–4 on penalties following a goalless draw.

In the 2005–06 Kategoria Superiore, Bulku made 24 appearances and scored once as Tirana finished runners-up in the league. In the final of the 2005–06 Albanian Cup on 10 May 2006, he played the full 90 minutes as Tirana defeated Vllaznia 1–0 to win the trophy. In the 2006 Albanian Supercup on 19 August 2006, Bulku played the full 90 minutes as Tirana defeated Elbasani 2–0 to win the trophy.

Bulku also featured regularly in European competitions against teams such as Dinamo Tbilisi, Ferencváros, CSKA Sofia and Kayserispor.

In his final season with Tirana, Bulku made 30 appearances and scored once in the 2006–07 Kategoria Superiore as the club won the league title.

=== Kryvbas ===
In the summer of 2007, Bulku joined Kryvbas Kryvyi Rih of the Ukrainian Premier League, where he played alongside fellow Albanian internationals Dorian Bylykbashi and Isli Hidi, while Ansi Agolli joined the club two years later. He made his debut on 28 July 2007 in a 3–0 league defeat against Karpaty Lviv. During the 2007–08 season, he established himself as a regular starter under coach Oleh Taran, featuring in midfield alongside Bylykbashi, Ruslan Kostyshyn and Anatoliy Oprya. He made 19 league appearances as Kryvbas finished 13th and avoided relegation.

During the 2008–09 season, Bulku remained a regular starter under Taran. On 19 July 2008, he provided the assist for the winning goal in a 1–0 victory over Metalurh Zaporizhya. He scored his first goal for the club on 22 March 2009 in a 1–0 win over Kharkiv, before adding another two weeks later in a 2–1 victory against Zorya Luhansk. He finished the campaign with 25 league appearances as Kryvbas improved to 12th place.

Bulku remained a first-team regular during the first half of the 2009–10 season, making 13 league appearances before leaving the club during the winter break after mutually terminating his contract. He made 58 league appearances and scored two goals during his two-and-a-half-year spell with Kryvbas.

=== Hajduk Split ===
After six months as a free agent, Bulku signed for Croatian side Hajduk Split of the Prva HNL in August 2010. He made his debut on 16 September 2010, starting and playing 81 minutes in a 3–1 defeat to AEK Athens in the 2010–11 UEFA Europa League group stage. He made his league debut three days later, playing 83 minutes in a 1–0 away victory over Rijeka. He established himself as a regular member of the first team during the 2010–11 season, making 15 league appearances, mostly as a starter, as Hajduk finished runners-up.

He made his second Europa League group-stage appearance on 30 September 2010 in a 1–0 victory over Anderlecht. On 4 November 2010, Bulku played the full 90 minutes in a 3–2 home defeat to Zenit Saint Petersburg, his third appearance in the competition. He made four appearances in the UEFA Europa League.

=== AZAL ===
At the end of June 2011, Bulku signed for AZAL of the Azerbaijan Premier League. He made his debut on 7 August 2011 in a 3–0 league victory over Simurq. He scored his first goal for the club three matches later, in a 3–1 win against Neftchi Baku on 27 August 2011. Bulku established himself as a regular starter throughout the 2011–12 season, making 22 league appearances and scoring three goals.

=== Sepahan ===
On 21 July 2012, Bulku signed a one-year contract with Iranian champions Sepahan, joining fellow Albanian player Xhevahir Sukaj, who had arrived at the club earlier that year.

He made his debut on 29 August 2012, playing the full 90 minutes in a 1–0 home victory over Fajr Sepasi. In the 2012–13 Hazfi Cup, Bulku scored in the quarter-final against Sanat Naft on 9 January 2013, helping Sepahan to a 2–0 victory and a place in the semi-finals. Sepahan went on to win the competition, giving Bulku his first major honour outside Albania. He scored his first league goal for the club on 6 April 2013 in a 3–1 victory over Naft Tehran, opening the scoring in the 12th minute. He was booked for removing his shirt during the celebration and was sent off in the 41st minute after receiving a second yellow card. In his first season, Bulku made 21 league appearances and scored once, while also featuring in five AFC Champions League matches.

In his second season, Bulku made 26 league appearances and scored once in the AFC Champions League, although Sepahan failed to progress beyond the group stage.

In May 2014, Bulku announced that he would leave the club following the expiration of his two-year contract.

=== Return to Tirana ===
On 5 June 2014, Tirana announced the signing of Bulku as a free agent, marking his return to the club after seven years abroad. The transfer was made official nine days later, when he signed a two-year contract. He joined the squad managed by Gugash Magani on 1 July following the opening of the summer transfer window. In August, team captain Erando Karabeci handed him the captain's armband as a sign of respect, becoming vice-captain instead.

He made his first appearance of the season on 24 August, playing the full 90 minutes in a 3–0 victory over Apolonia Fier in the opening league match at Qemal Stafa Stadium. He scored his only goal of the season on matchday three, netting a stoppage-time equaliser in a 1–1 away draw against Vllaznia Shkodër in a match marred by crowd trouble that resulted in arrests and stadium bans.

Bulku finished his first season back at Tirana with 32 appearances in all competitions and one goal.

He started the first three matches of the 2015–16 season, but an injury caused him to lose his place in the starting lineup. He finished the campaign with four league appearances.

== International career ==
Bulku made his international debut for the Albania under-18 team during the 1999 UEFA European Under-18 Championship qualifying, appearing in all three matches in November 1998, and repeated the feat in qualification for the 2000 edition, where he also scored his first goal at youth international level. He later represented the Albania under-21 side, making 15 appearances and scoring one goal during the 2002 and 2004 European Under-21 qualification campaigns between 2000 and 2003.

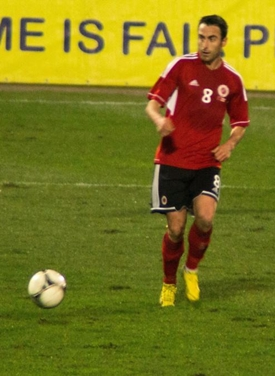
Bulku with the Albania national team in 2013.

Bulku was part of the Albania senior team from 2002, making his debut under assistant coach Mirel Josa on 13 March 2002 against Mexico, playing the full 90-minutes in a 2–0 defeat. He made two further appearances in late March and the following month under head coach Sulejman Demollari.

He was not called up again until 2006, when coach Otto Barić included him in the squad for a UEFA Euro 2008 qualifying match against Netherlands on 11 October, remaining an unused substitute in the 2–1 defeat. His next appearance came on 7 February 2007 in a friendly against Macedonia, replacing captain Altin Lala at half-time in a 1–0 defeat. During the remainder of the Euro 2008 qualifying campaign, Bulku became a regular member of the squad, making five further appearances—three as a substitute and two as a starter—as Albania recorded three draws and two defeats in the group, finishing third from bottom for the first time in its history in the European qualifiers.

During the 2010 FIFA World Cup qualifying campaign under coach Arie Haan, Bulku initially began as a secondary option in midfield, but soon established himself as a regular starter, featuring in three matches in which Albania kept clean sheets, including a 3–0 victory and two 0–0 draws, one of which came against Portugal featuring Cristiano Ronaldo, the eventual winner of the 2008 Ballon d'Or, despite Albania playing with 10 men. Following a 3–0 defeat to Denmark on 1 April 2009, a managerial change brought Josip Kuže to the helm, under whom Bulku played almost every available minute in the remaining three qualifiers, missing only one minute in total. In these final matches, Albania suffered defeats against Portugal and Sweden and earned a 1–1 draw against group leaders Denmark, ultimately finishing fifth in the six-team group.

During the UEFA Euro 2012 qualifying campaign, Bulku began as an ever-present starter, featuring for the full 90 minutes in four of the first five matches as Albania recorded two 1–0 wins and two 1–1 draws, while also playing less than an hour in a 2–0 loss, before later making another full 90-minute appearance in a further 2–0 defeat. He scored his first senior goal on 9 February 2011 in a friendly against Slovenia, equalising in the 62nd minute before Albania eventually lost 2–1. In the remaining fixtures of the qualification campaign, he made two additional appearances in September 2011—one as a starter and one as a substitute—in two 2–1 defeats that mathematically eliminated Albania from qualification contention, prompting coach Josip Kuže to adopt a more experimental approach with squad rotation and younger players, after which Bulku was not called up for the final matches of the campaign in October 2011.

Bulku retained his place as a regular starter for the 2014 FIFA World Cup qualifying campaign under coach Gianni De Biasi, starting nine of Albania's ten group matches. During the opening four fixtures in autumn 2012, he was ever-present in defensive midfield alongside new arrival Burim Kukeli, as Albania recorded two wins and two defeats. During the second half of the campaign in 2013, Bulku formed a new defensive-midfield partnership with another new arrival, Migjen Basha, and provided assists in both matches against Norway, setting up Hamdi Salihi for the only goal in a 1–0 away victory on 22 March, before assisting Valdet Rama in the reverse fixture on 7 June after a long pass from inside Albania's own half shortly before half-time. In the latter match, Bulku captained Albania for the first time, with Norway eventually securing a 1–1 draw through a late equaliser, though the result still lifted Albania to second place in Group E. Bulku was also regarded as physically strong and a reliable defensive presence in midfield. In April 2013, Albania achieved a historic rise in the FIFA World Rankings, climbing 16 places to 48th position, their highest ranking at the time. In the remaining fixtures, Bulku was mostly a starter during the autumn of 2013, as Albania recorded three consecutive defeats and a goalless draw, dropping to second from bottom in the group.

Ahead of the UEFA Euro 2016 qualifying campaign, De Biasi's ongoing squad overhaul had already introduced several new defensive midfield options, including players who switched allegiance from the Swiss U21 side as well as experienced and emerging options, creating strong competition for places and resulting in Bulku being included in the match protocol for only one fixture as an unused substitute midway through the campaign, despite continuing to receive regular call-ups. Albania ultimately finished as runners-up in the group and qualified for the first time in their history for a major tournament, while Bulku later participated in the UEFA Euro 2016 finals as part of De Biasi's coaching staff.

== Managerial career ==
After limited involvement as a player for the Albania national team during the UEFA Euro 2016 qualifying campaign, Bulku was appointed assistant manager to Gianni De Biasi, becoming the third assistant coach alongside Paolo Tramezzani and Erjon Bogdani. He made his debut in the role on 17 November 2015 in a match against Georgia. Bulku continued in the assistant manager role during Albania's first appearance at a major international tournament, the UEFA Euro 2016. Albania finished third in Group A with three points and a −2 goal difference, and were eliminated after ranking last among the third-placed teams.

On 23 March 2019, following the dismissal of Albania national team head coach Christian Panucci after a 2–0 home defeat to Turkey on the opening matchday of the UEFA Euro 2020 qualifying campaign, Bulku was appointed caretaker manager, with Sulejman Mema serving as his assistant for the following match against Andorra two days later. The match was played away and Albania won 3–0, with two of the goals scored in the second half by substitutes Bekim Balaj and Amir Abrashi.

== Career statistics ==
=== Club ===
Appearances and goals by club, season and competition
Club	Season	League			Cup		Continental (Note: Includes UEFA Champions League, UEFA Europa League and Asian Champions League.)		Supercup (Note: Includes Albanian Supercup.)		Total	
Club	Season	Division	Apps	Goals	Apps	Goals	Apps	Goals	Apps	Goals	Apps	Goals
Tirana	1998–99	Albanian Superliga	13	0	—		—		—		13	0
Tirana	1999–00	Albanian Superliga	21 (Note: Includes appearance in the play-off title final)	0	—		1	0	—		22	0
Tirana	2000–01	Albanian Superliga	12	0	1	1	—		1	0	14	1
Tirana	2001–02	Albanian Superliga	22	2	3	2	2	0	—		27	4
Tirana	2002–03	Albanian Superliga	22	1	3	1	2	0	1	1	28	3
Tirana	2003–04	Albanian Superliga	24	2			2	0	—		26	2
Tirana	2004–05	Albanian Superliga	33	7	2	1	4	0	1	0	40	8
Tirana	2005–06	Albanian Superliga	24	1	1	0	4	0	1	0	30	1
Tirana	2006–07	Albanian Superliga	30	1	1	0	4	0	1	0	36	1
Tirana	Total		201	14	11	5	19	0	5	1	236	20
Kryvbas	2007–08	Ukrainian Premier League	19	0	—		—		—		19	0
Kryvbas	2008–09	Ukrainian Premier League	25	2	—		—		—		25	2
Kryvbas	2009–10	Ukrainian Premier League	14	0	0	0	—		—		14	0
Kryvbas	Total		58	2	0	0	—		—		58	2
Hajduk Split	2010–11	Prva HNL	15	0	—		4	0	—		19	0
AZAL	2011–12	Azerbaijan Premier League	22	3	2	0	—		—		24	3
Sepahan	2011–12	Iran Pro League	—		—		2	0	—		2	0
Sepahan	2012–13	Iran Pro League	21	1	—		3	0	—		24	1
Sepahan	2013–14	Iran Pro League	26	0	—		5	1	—		31	1
Sepahan	Total		47	1	0	0	10	1	—		57	2
Tirana	2014–15	Albanian Superliga	28	1	4	0	—		—		32	1
Tirana	2015–16	Albanian Superliga	4	0	0	0	—		—		4	0
Tirana	Total		32	1	4	0	—		—		36	1
Total			375	21	17	5	33	1	5	1	430	28

=== International ===
Appearances and goals by national team and year
National team	Year	Apps	Goals
Albania	2002	3	0
Albania	2003 to 2006	0	0
Albania	2007	7	0
Albania	2008	6	0
Albania	2009	7	0
Albania	2010	9	0
Albania	2011	7	1
Albania	2012	9	0
Albania	2013	7	0
Albania	2014	1	0
Albania	2015	0	0
Total		56	1

Albania's squads score listed first, score column indicates score after each Bulku's goal.

International goals by date, venue, cap, opponent, score, result and competition
For	Date	Venue	Cap	Opponent	Score	Result	Competition
U-18	27 September 1999	Stadium Forssa, Forssa, Finland	4	Faroe Islands	1–1	3–1	2000 UEFA European Under-18 Championship qualifying
U-21	31 August 2001	Qemal Stafa, Tirana, Albania	7	Finland	3–0	3–0	2002 UEFA European Under-21 Championship qualification
Senior	9 February 2011	Qemal Stafa Stadium, Tirana, Albania	33	Slovenia	1–1	1–2	Friendly

== Honours ==
Tirana

- Albanian Superliga: 1998–1999, 1999–2000, 2002–2003, 2003–2004, 2004–2005, 2006–2007
- Albanian Cup: 1998–99, 2000–01, 2001–02, 2005–06
- Albanian Supercup: 2000, 2002, 2003, 2005, 2006, 2007

Sepahan

- Hazfi Cup: 2012–13

Sporting positions
Preceded by Erando Karabeci	KF Tirana captain 2014–2016	Succeeded by Erando Karabeci
