= UEFA Euro 2016 Group A =

Football tournament group stage

Group A of UEFA Euro 2016 contained France, Romania, debutant Albania and Switzerland. France was the only former European champion in this group, having won the championship two times (in 1984 and 2000). Matches were played from 10 to 19 June 2016.

== Teams ==
Draw position	Team	Pot	Method of qualification	Date of qualification	Finals appearance	Last appearance	Previous best performance	UEFA Rankings October 2015 (Note: The UEFA rankings of October 2015 were used for seeding for the final draw.)	FIFA Rankings June 2016
A1	France	1	Host	28 May 2010	9th	2012	Winners (1984, 2000)	8	17
A2	Romania	3	Group F runner-up	11 October 2015	5th	2008	Quarter-finals (2000)	18	22
A3	Albania	4	Group I runner-up	11 October 2015	1st	—	Debut	31	42
A4	Switzerland	2	Group E runner-up	9 October 2015	4th	2008	Group stage (1996, 2004, 2008)	10	15

== Standings ==
Pos	Team	Pld	W	D	L	GF	GA	GD	Pts	Qualification
1	France (H)	3	2	1	0	4	1	+3	7	Advance to knockout stage
2	Switzerland	3	1	2	0	2	1	+1	5	Advance to knockout stage
3	Albania	3	1	0	2	1	3	−2	3	
4	Romania	3	0	1	2	2	4	−2	1	

Source: UEFA
Rules for classification: Group stage tiebreakers
(H) Hosts

In the round of 16,

- The winner of Group A, France, advanced to play the third-placed team of Group E, Republic of Ireland.
- The runner-up of Group A, Switzerland, advanced to play the runner-up of Group C, Poland.

== Matches ==
=== France vs Romania ===
10 June 2016
21:00

France	2–1	Romania
Giroud 57'; Payet 89'	Report	Stancu 65' (pen.)

Stade de France, Saint-Denis
Attendance: 75,113
Referee: Viktor Kassai (Hungary)

France	Romania

GK	1	Hugo Lloris (c)
RB	19	Bacary Sagna
CB	4	Adil Rami
CB	21	Laurent Koscielny
LB	3	Patrice Evra
CM	15	Paul Pogba		(substituted off) 77'
CM	5	N'Golo Kanté
CM	14	Blaise Matuidi
RW	7	Antoine Griezmann		(substituted off) 66'
LW	8	Dimitri Payet		(substituted off) 90+2'
CF	9	Olivier Giroud	(yellow card) 69'
Substitutions:
FW	20	Kingsley Coman		(substituted on) 66'
FW	11	Anthony Martial		(substituted on) 77'
MF	18	Moussa Sissoko		(substituted on) 90+2'
Manager:
Didier Deschamps

GK	12	Ciprian Tătărușanu
RB	22	Cristian Săpunaru
CB	6	Vlad Chiricheș (c)	(yellow card) 32'
CB	21	Dragoș Grigore
LB	3	Răzvan Raț	(yellow card) 45'
CM	10	Nicolae Stanciu		(substituted off) 72'
CM	5	Ovidiu Hoban
CM	8	Mihai Pintilii
RW	20	Adrian Popa	(yellow card) 78'	(substituted off) 82'
LW	19	Bogdan Stancu
CF	14	Florin Andone		(substituted off) 61'
Substitutions:
FW	9	Denis Alibec		(substituted on) 61'
MF	7	Alexandru Chipciu		(substituted on) 72'
MF	11	Gabriel Torje		(substituted on) 82'
Manager:
Anghel Iordănescu

Man of the Match:
Dimitri Payet (France)

Assistant referees:
György Ring (Hungary)
Vencel Tóth (Hungary)
Fourth official:
Björn Kuipers (Netherlands)
Additional assistant referees:
Tamás Bognár (Hungary)
Ádám Farkas (Hungary)
Reserve assistant referee:
Sander van Roekel (Netherlands)

=== Albania vs Switzerland ===
11 June 2016
15:00

Albania	0–1	Switzerland
	Report	Schär 5'

Stade Bollaert-Delelis, Lens
Attendance: 33,805
Referee: Carlos Velasco Carballo (Spain)

Albania	Switzerland

GK	1	Etrit Berisha
RB	4	Elseid Hysaj
CB	5	Lorik Cana (c)	(yellow card) 23' (yellow-red card) 36'
CB	15	Mërgim Mavraj	(yellow card) 90+2'
LB	7	Ansi Agolli
RM	22	Amir Abrashi
CM	13	Burim Kukeli	(yellow card) 89'
LM	14	Taulant Xhaka		(substituted off) 62'
RW	21	Odise Roshi		(substituted off) 74'
LW	3	Ermir Lenjani
CF	10	Armando Sadiku		(substituted off) 82'
Substitutions:
MF	20	Ergys Kaçe	(yellow card) 63'	(substituted on) 62'
FW	16	Sokol Cikalleshi		(substituted on) 74'
FW	11	Shkëlzen Gashi		(substituted on) 82'
Manager:
(Italy) Gianni De Biasi

GK	1	Yann Sommer
RB	2	Stephan Lichtsteiner (c)
CB	22	Fabian Schär	(yellow card) 14'
CB	20	Johan Djourou
LB	13	Ricardo Rodriguez
CM	11	Valon Behrami	(yellow card) 66'
CM	10	Granit Xhaka
RW	23	Xherdan Shaqiri		(substituted off) 88'
AM	15	Blerim Džemaili		(substituted off) 76'
LW	18	Admir Mehmedi		(substituted off) 62'
CF	9	Haris Seferovic
Substitutions:
FW	7	Breel Embolo		(substituted on) 62'
MF	8	Fabian Frei		(substituted on) 76'
MF	16	Gelson Fernandes		(substituted on) 88'
Manager:
Vladimir Petković

Man of the Match:
Granit Xhaka (Switzerland)

Assistant referees:
Roberto Alonso Fernández (Spain)
Juan Carlos Yuste Jiménez (Spain)
Fourth official:
Pol van Boekel (Netherlands)
Additional assistant referees:
Jesús Gil Manzano (Spain)
Carlos del Cerro Grande (Spain)
Reserve assistant referee:
Erwin Zeinstra (Netherlands)

=== Romania vs Switzerland ===
15 June 2016
18:00

Romania	1–1	Switzerland
Stancu 18' (pen.)	Report	Mehmedi 57'

Parc des Princes, Paris
Attendance: 43,576
Referee: Sergei Karasev (Russia)

Romania	Switzerland

GK	12	Ciprian Tătărușanu
RB	22	Cristian Săpunaru
CB	6	Vlad Chiricheș (c)
CB	21	Dragoș Grigore	(yellow card) 76'
LB	3	Răzvan Raț		(substituted off) 62'
CM	18	Andrei Prepeliță	(yellow card) 22'
CM	8	Mihai Pintilii		(substituted off) 46'
RW	11	Gabriel Torje
AM	19	Bogdan Stancu		(substituted off) 84'
LW	7	Alexandru Chipciu	(yellow card) 24'
CF	13	Claudiu Keșerü	(yellow card) 37'
Substitutions:
MF	5	Ovidiu Hoban		(substituted on) 46'
DF	16	Steliano Filip		(substituted on) 62'
FW	14	Florin Andone		(substituted on) 84'
Manager:
Anghel Iordănescu

GK	1	Yann Sommer
RB	2	Stephan Lichtsteiner (c)
CB	22	Fabian Schär
CB	20	Johan Djourou
LB	13	Ricardo Rodriguez
CM	11	Valon Behrami
CM	10	Granit Xhaka	(yellow card) 50'
RW	23	Xherdan Shaqiri		(substituted off) 90+1'
AM	15	Blerim Džemaili		(substituted off) 83'
LW	18	Admir Mehmedi
CF	9	Haris Seferovic		(substituted off) 63'
Substitutions:
FW	7	Breel Embolo	(yellow card) 90+4'	(substituted on) 63'
DF	6	Michael Lang		(substituted on) 83'
FW	17	Shani Tarashaj		(substituted on) 90+1'
Manager:
Vladimir Petković

Man of the Match:
Granit Xhaka (Switzerland)

Assistant referees:
Nikolai Golubev (Russia)
Tikhon Kalugin (Russia)
Fourth official:
Aleksei Kulbakov (Belarus)
Additional assistant referees:
Sergey Lapochkin (Russia)
Sergey Ivanov (Russia)
Reserve assistant referee:
Vitali Maliutsin (Belarus)

=== France vs Albania ===
15 June 2016
21:00

France	2–0	Albania
Griezmann 90'; Payet 90+6'	Report

Stade Vélodrome, Marseille
Attendance: 63,670
Referee: Willie Collum (Scotland)

France	Albania

GK	1	Hugo Lloris (c)
RB	19	Bacary Sagna
CB	4	Adil Rami
CB	21	Laurent Koscielny
LB	3	Patrice Evra
CM	5	N'Golo Kanté	(yellow card) 88'
CM	14	Blaise Matuidi
RW	20	Kingsley Coman		(substituted off) 68'
AM	8	Dimitri Payet
LW	11	Anthony Martial		(substituted off) 46'
CF	9	Olivier Giroud		(substituted off) 77'
Substitutions:
MF	15	Paul Pogba		(substituted on) 46'
FW	7	Antoine Griezmann		(substituted on) 68'
FW	10	André-Pierre Gignac		(substituted on) 77'
Manager:
Didier Deschamps

GK	1	Etrit Berisha
RB	4	Elseid Hysaj
CB	18	Arlind Ajeti		(substituted off) 85'
CB	15	Mërgim Mavraj
LB	7	Ansi Agolli (c)
DM	13	Burim Kukeli	(yellow card) 55'	(substituted off) 74'
CM	22	Amir Abrashi	(yellow card) 81'
CM	9	Ledian Memushaj
RW	2	Andi Lila		(substituted off) 71'
LW	3	Ermir Lenjani
CF	10	Armando Sadiku
Substitutions:
MF	21	Odise Roshi		(substituted on) 71'
MF	14	Taulant Xhaka		(substituted on) 74'
DF	6	Frédéric Veseli		(substituted on) 85'
Manager:
(Italy) Gianni De Biasi

Man of the Match:
Dimitri Payet (France)

Assistant referees:
Damien MacGraith (Republic of Ireland)
Francis Connor (Scotland)
Fourth official:
Michael Oliver (England)
Additional assistant referees:
Bobby Madden (Scotland)
John Beaton (Scotland)
Reserve assistant referee:
Michael Mullarkey (England)

=== Romania vs Albania ===
19 June 2016
21:00

Romania	0–1	Albania
	Report	Sadiku 43'

Parc Olympique Lyonnais, Décines-Charpieu
Attendance: 49,752
Referee: Pavel Královec (Czech Republic)

Romania	Albania

GK	12	Ciprian Tătărușanu
RB	22	Cristian Săpunaru	(yellow card) 85'
CB	21	Dragoș Grigore
CB	6	Vlad Chiricheș (c)
LB	2	Alexandru Mățel	(yellow card) 54'
CM	18	Andrei Prepeliță		(substituted off) 46'
CM	5	Ovidiu Hoban
RW	20	Adrian Popa		(substituted off) 68'
AM	10	Nicolae Stanciu
LW	19	Bogdan Stancu
CF	9	Denis Alibec		(substituted off) 57'
Substitutions:
MF	17	Lucian Sânmărtean		(substituted on) 46'
MF	11	Gabriel Torje	(yellow card) 90+3'	(substituted on) 57'
FW	14	Florin Andone		(substituted on) 68'
Manager:
Anghel Iordănescu

GK	1	Etrit Berisha
RB	4	Elseid Hysaj	(yellow card) 90+4'
CB	18	Arlind Ajeti
CB	15	Mërgim Mavraj
LB	7	Ansi Agolli (c)
DM	8	Migjen Basha	(yellow card) 6'	(substituted off) 83'
CM	22	Amir Abrashi
CM	9	Ledian Memushaj	(yellow card) 85'
RW	2	Andi Lila
LW	3	Ermir Lenjani		(substituted off) 77'
CF	10	Armando Sadiku		(substituted off) 59'
Substitutions:
FW	19	Bekim Balaj		(substituted on) 59'
MF	21	Odise Roshi		(substituted on) 77'
DF	5	Lorik Cana		(substituted on) 83'
Manager:
(Italy) Gianni De Biasi

Man of the Match:
Arlind Ajeti (Albania)

Assistant referees:
Roman Slyško (Slovakia)
Tomáš Mokrusch (Czech Republic)
Fourth official:
Anastasios Sidiropoulos (Greece)
Additional assistant referees:
Petr Ardeleánu (Czech Republic)
Michal Paták (Czech Republic)
Reserve assistant referee:
Damianos Efthymiadis (Greece)

=== Switzerland vs France ===
19 June 2016
21:00

Switzerland	0–0	France
	Report

Stade Pierre-Mauroy, Villeneuve-d'Ascq
Attendance: 45,616
Referee: Damir Skomina (Slovenia)

Switzerland	France

GK	1	Yann Sommer
RB	2	Stephan Lichtsteiner (c)
CB	22	Fabian Schär
CB	20	Johan Djourou
LB	13	Ricardo Rodriguez
CM	11	Valon Behrami
CM	10	Granit Xhaka
RW	23	Xherdan Shaqiri	(substituted off) 79'
AM	15	Blerim Džemaili
LW	18	Admir Mehmedi	(substituted off) 86'
CF	7	Breel Embolo	(substituted off) 74'
Substitutions:
FW	9	Haris Seferovic	(substituted on) 74'
MF	16	Gelson Fernandes	(substituted on) 79'
DF	6	Michael Lang	(substituted on) 86'
Manager:
Vladimir Petković

GK	1	Hugo Lloris (c)
RB	19	Bacary Sagna
CB	4	Adil Rami	(yellow card) 25'
CB	21	Laurent Koscielny	(yellow card) 83'
LB	3	Patrice Evra
RM	18	Moussa Sissoko
CM	6	Yohan Cabaye
LM	15	Paul Pogba
RW	20	Kingsley Coman		(substituted off) 63'
LW	7	Antoine Griezmann		(substituted off) 77'
CF	10	André-Pierre Gignac
Substitutions:
MF	8	Dimitri Payet		(substituted on) 63'
MF	14	Blaise Matuidi		(substituted on) 77'
Manager:
Didier Deschamps

Man of the Match:
Yann Sommer (Switzerland)

Assistant referees:
Jure Praprotnik (Slovenia)
Robert Vukan (Slovenia)
Fourth official:
Marco Fritz (Germany)
Additional assistant referees:
Matej Jug (Slovenia)
Slavko Vinčić (Slovenia)
Reserve assistant referee:
Mark Borsch (Germany)

== See also ==
- Albania at the UEFA European Championship
- France at the UEFA European Championship
- Romania at the UEFA European Championship
- Switzerland at the UEFA European Championship
