= Ansi Agolli =

Albanian footballer (born 1982)

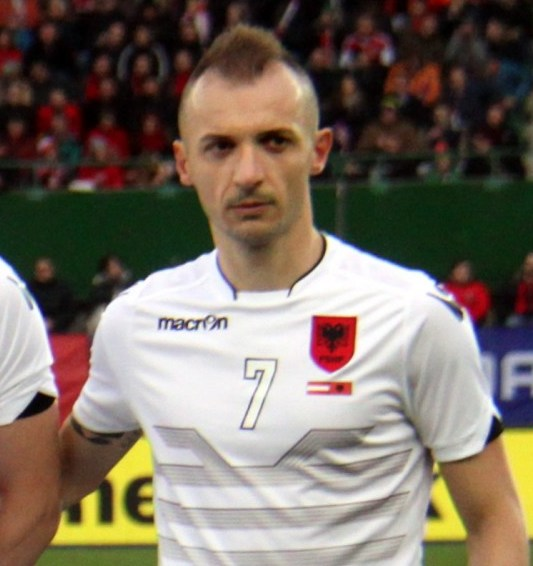
- Agolli with Albania in March 2016

Personal information
- Date of birth: 11 October 1982 (age 44)
- Place of birth: Tirana, PSR Albania
- Height: 1.78 m (5 ft 10 in)
- Position: Left-back

Team information
- Current team: AB7 Future Soccer Academy (owner-coach)

Youth career
- 1991–2000: Tirana

Senior career*
Years	Team	Apps	(Gls)
2000–2005	Tirana	64	(5)
2003	→ Apolonia Fier (loan)	12	(1)
2005–2006	Neuchâtel Xamax	29	(3)
2006–2007	Luzern	8	(0)
2007–2009	VPS	33	(1)
2008–2009	→ Tirana (loan)	29	(5)
2009–2011	Kryvbas Kryvyi Rih	13	(0)
2010–2011	→ Qarabağ (loan)	48	(1)
2012–2019	Qarabağ	176	(2)
2019	New York Cosmos B	9	(0)
2020	New York Cosmos	7	(2)
Total		431	(20)

International career
2002–2003	Albania U21	6	(0)
2005–2018	Albania	73	(3)
Medal record
- * Club domestic league appearances and goals

Ansi Agolli (born 11 October 1982) is an Albanian football manager and former player who is the owner and coach of AB7 Future Soccer Academy.

He began his club career with Tirana, where he won multiple domestic titles, including three Kategoria Superiore championships, two Albanian Cups and three Albanian Supercups. After playing for several clubs abroad, he spent a significant part of his career with Qarabağ in the Azerbaijan Premier League, where he established himself as a long-serving first-team player, winning five consecutive league titles and three Azerbaijan Cups. During his time at the club, he featured regularly in European competition, including multiple appearances in the UEFA Europa League and the UEFA Champions League, becoming part of the first Azerbaijani team to reach the Champions League group stage. He was named Qarabağ Player of the Season in 2014–15.

At international level, he earned 73 caps and scored two goals for the Albania national team, serving as team captain in his last years.

He is regarded as the most decorated Albanian footballer, having won a total of 16 trophies, the first being 2003–04 Kategoria Superiore.

== Club career ==
=== Tirana ===
Agolli was born in Tirana and began playing football at age of nine, joining the KF Tirana Academy. After progressing through the club's youth system, he joined the first team in the 2000–01 season and made his debut at the age of 19.

In the following season, he played in the 2001–02 Albanian Cup first round against Laçi, scoring three goals across both legs on 18 and 24 August 2001, as Tirana advanced to the next round with a 6–0 aggregate victory.

Agolli made his continental debut on 15 August 2002 in the 2002–03 UEFA Cup qualifying round against Progresul București.

Agolli was part of the Tirana squad that won the 2002 Albanian Supercup with a 6–0 victory over Dinamo Tirana on 14 September 2002.

He made a total of 10 league appearances for Tirana in his first three seasons before being sent on loan to fellow Kategoria Superiore side Apolonia Fier in January 2003 to help the club in their battle to avoid relegation.

He made 12 appearances and scored one goal for Apolonia Fier, but the side were relegated to the Albanian First Division after losing the relegation playoff.

He then returned to Tirana ahead of the 2003–04 season.

==== Return and establishment as a starter (2003–2005) ====
Agolli described the 2002–03 Tirana squad as the core of a team that continued into the 2003–04 season, in which he became increasingly involved with the first team following his return from loan.

Agolli began the season by scoring in added time in the 2003–04 UEFA Champions League second qualifying round match against Grazer AK on 6 August 2003. Despite his late goal, Tirana were eliminated following a 2–1 defeat on the night and a 7–2 aggregate loss.

Tirana secured its first trophy of the season by winning the 2003 Albanian Supercup, defeating Dinamo Tirana 3–0 on 16 August 2003, with Agolli scoring the third goal late in the match.

During the 2003–04 Albanian Cup, Agolli scored in Tirana's 5–2 second-round victory away to Cërriku on 1 October 2003.

In domestic league, Agolli established himself as a regular starter, playing the majority of league matches from the beginning. On 24 April 2004, Agolli scored a league goal in a 3–2 win against Shkumbini.

Tirana dominated the 2003–04 Kategoria Superiore season, finishing as champions with 80 points, having won 24, drawn 8 and lost 4 of their 36 league matches, and scoring 90 goals while conceding 36.

At the start of the 2004–05 season, Agolli took part in Tirana's 2004–05 UEFA Champions League first qualifying round tie against Belarusian side Gomel in July 2004, starting in both legs. Tirana won 2–0 away and lost 1–0 at home, progressing to the second qualifying round with a 2–1 aggregate victory.

In the second qualifying round against Ferencváros, Agolli remained an unused substitute in both matches as Tirana were eliminated on away goals following a 3–3 aggregate draw.

Agolli did not feature in the 2004 Albanian Supercup final, which Tirana lost 2–0 to Partizani.

During the 2004–05 Kategoria Superiore season, Tirana finished as champions with 84 points, winning 26 matches, drawing six and losing four, while scoring 82 goals and conceding 32; Agolli participated in 31 matches and contributed with five goals during the campaign, scoring against Dinamo Tirana, Laçi (twice), Lushnja and Partizani.

In the 2004–05 Albanian Cup final, Agolli started for Tirana and was substituted in the 70th minute as the match ended goalless after extra time, with Tirana losing 6–5 on penalties to Teuta on 11 May 2005.

=== Neuchâtel Xamax ===
After spending two years at Tirana, he was spotted by Swiss club Neuchâtel Xamax which at the time was coached by Miroslav Blažević. Following a trial period, in July 2005 Agolli signed a two-year contract.

He made his debut for Neuchâtel Xamax on 10 July 2005 against Saint-Étienne in the 2005 UEFA Intertoto Cup second round, playing 63 minutes.

Three days later, on 13 July 2005, he made his league debut, scoring a goal in a 3–1 home defeat against BSC Young Boys in the opening round of the 2005–06 Swiss Super League, playing the full 90 minutes. One week later, on 23 July 2005, Agolli scored his second consecutive goal, netting a 90th-minute equaliser in a 1–1 away draw against Schaffhausen, before being sent off after receiving a second yellow card late in the match.

Agolli established himself as a regular starter at Neuchâtel Xamax, frequently playing the full 90 minutes throughout the 2005–06 Swiss Super League season.

On 18 November 2005, in the matchday 15, he scored his third league goal in a 3–2 away victory against Thun.

During the 2005–06 season, Agolli made a total of 29 league appearances, and Neuchâtel Xamax finished the 2005–06 Swiss Super League season in ninth place (second from bottom) and entered the relegation play-off.

In the 2005–06 Swiss Cup, Agolli scored in a 4–0 away win against Bex.

=== Luzern ===
After one season at Neuchâtel Xamax, on 29 July 2006, Agolli signed a one-year contract with Luzern, with an option to extend the deal.

Agolli made his debut on 5 August 2006, starting in a 2–1 home victory against Aarau in matchday 4 of the 2006–07 Swiss Super League.

Following his debut, Agolli established himself as a regular starter, playing the full 90 minutes in the next two league matches, both of which ended without a victory for Luzern. Afterwards, Agolli lost his place in the starting lineup and was used only as a substitute, making only brief appearances from the bench. By the end of 2006, he had made a total of eight league appearances for the club.

During the winter transfer window of 2007, Agolli left Luzern as part of the club's squad changes ahead of the second half of the season.

=== Vaasan Palloseura ===
In January 2007, Agolli moved to Finland to join Vaasan Palloseura (VPS), competing in the Veikkausliiga, the top division of Finnish football.

In the 2007 Veikkausliiga season, he made 18 league appearances.

Agolli remained with Vaasan Palloseura into the 2008 season.

During the first half of the 2008 Veikkausliiga season, Agolli featured regularly in the league, being nearly ever-present, starting all available matches and missing only five minutes of playing time.

He scored one goal on 26 August 2008 in matchday 9 against Honka in a 2–1 away victory.

Overall, Agolli made a total of 33 league appearances for Vaasan Palloseura, scoring one goal.

==== Return to Tirana as loan ====
Despite having a contract with Vaasan Palloseura until the end of the 2009 season, Agolli returned to Albania for family reasons in July 2008 and joined his former club Tirana on loan until 30 April 2009.

Following his loan move to Tirana, Agolli featured regularly in the team's defence during the early part of the 2008–09 Kategoria Superiore, as the club made a strong start to the campaign, conceding only two goals in its first six league matches.

In December 2008, Blaž Slišković left Tirana following a run of poor results and was subsequently replaced as head coach by Agustin Kola during the 2008–09 season.

Agolli scored his first goal of the season on 31 January 2009, netting in a 4–2 away victory against Dinamo Tirana, which made Tirana remaining closely involved in the title race, sitting just one point behind Vllaznia.

He scored again in the following round, netting Tirana's second goal in a 2–0 home win over Shkumbini on 5 February 2009.

Agolli scored for a third consecutive match on 15 February 2009, finding the net in a 3–1 away victory over Besa.

Towards the end of the season, Agolli contributed decisively as Tirana held a narrow lead in the title race, providing the assist for a late winning goal against Partizani that helped establish a one-point advantage at the top of the table.

He scored his fourth league goal of the season on 25 April 2009, netting late in a 4–1 home win against Teuta.

In April 2009, Agolli returned as planned to Vaasan Palloseura.

However, Agolli's registration was acquired from VPS and he played in the 2009 Albanian Cup final on 6 May 2009 against Flamurtari, where Tirana lost 2–1; following the defeat, Tirana's coach Agustin Kola resigned and was replaced by technical director Alban Tafaj.

He scored his fifth and final league goal of the season on 16 May 2009 in a 3–2 away win against Dinamo.

Tirana secured the Kategoria Superiore title on the final matchday with a 2–1 home victory over Vllaznia.

=== Kryvbas Kryvyi Rih ===
In July 2009, Agolli transferred to Kryvbas Kryvyi Rih in the Ukrainian Premier League for a reported fee of €30,000. Agolli rejoined teammates from the Albania national team, Ervin Bulku, Isli Hidi and Dorian Bylykbashi.

Agolli made his debut on 18 July 2009, in the 2009–10 Ukrainian Premier League opening campaign, starting and playing the full 90 minutes in a 3–0 away loss against Shakhtar Donetsk.

During the campaign, Agolli spoke about adapting to the higher level of competition in the Ukrainian league compared to Albania, noting that the professional environment demanded a different level of play.

After his debut in July 2009, Agolli was primarily used as a substitute, making five consecutive second-half appearances as Kryvbas recorded four defeats and one goalless draw. He returned to the starting lineup in early December remaining even after the winter break, playing nearly every minute in five league matches, but Kryvbas suffered five consecutive league defeats during that period.

Agolli made a total of 13 appearances until the end of the season.

=== Qarabağ ===
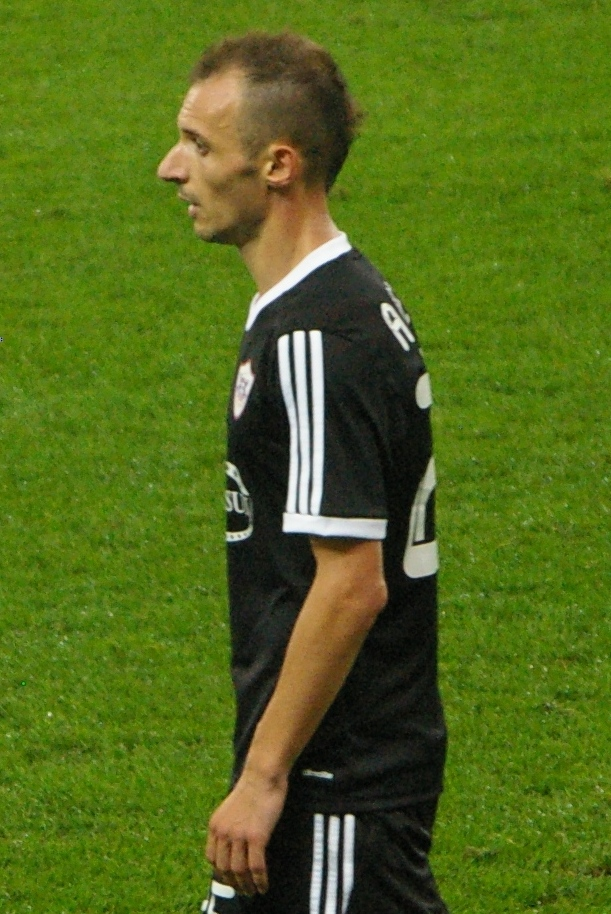
Agolli with Qarabağ in 2014.

In July 2010, Agolli moved on loan to Qarabağ in the Azerbaijan Premier League until the end of December 2011.

Agolli immediately featured for Qarabağ in the 2010–11 UEFA Europa League qualifying, starting from the first round, playing six full matches out of eight as Qarabağ progressed through three rounds before being eliminated by Borussia Dortmund in the play-off round.

Agolli played 31 league matches in the 2010–11 Azerbaijan Premier League as Qarabağ finished in third place.

Agolli featured in the 2011–12 UEFA Europa League qualifying and scored his first goal for Qarabağ in a 3–0 victory against Banga Gargždai in the first qualifying round. He played every minute of the qualifying campaign, as Qarabağ reached the third qualifying round before being eliminated by Club Brugge.

Agolli scored his first league goal for Qarabağ on 30 September 2011 in a 3–1 home victory against Turan Tovuz on matchday eight of the 2011–12 Azerbaijan Premier League.

In January 2012, the loan move was made permanent for a reported fee of £30,000.

Agolli finished the season with a total of 31 league appearances as Qarabağ placed fourth in the league.

In December 2012, German Bundesliga club Eintracht Frankfurt were reported to have shown interest in signing Agolli ahead of the following season; however, no transfer ultimately materialised.

Agolli participated in the 2013–14 UEFA Europa League qualifying, playing eight full matches as Qarabağ progressed through three rounds before being eliminated by Eintracht Frankfurt in the play-off round.

On 22 February 2013, Agolli scored the winning goal in a 3–2 away victory against Ravan Baku.

During the 2012–13 season, Agolli made 27 league appearances and scored one goal as Qarabağ finished second in the Azerbaijan Premier League.

Agolli scored a goal on 4 October 2013 against Baku in a 3–0 victory.

In the 2013–14 season, Agolli made 31 league appearances as Qarabağ won the league title, marking his first championship trophy with the club.

Agolli featured in the 2014–15 UEFA Champions League qualifying, playing nearly every minute across two qualifying rounds, as Qarabağ were eliminated by Red Bull Salzburg in the third qualifying round.

As a result of their elimination from the Champions League, Qarabağ entered the 2014–15 UEFA Europa League play-off round, facing Twente; in the first leg on 21 August 2014, Agolli played the full 90 minutes in a goalless draw. Agolli also played the full 90 minutes in the second leg on 28 August 2014 which ended in a 1–1 draw, as Qarabağ advanced to the group stage on away goals.

Agolli made his debut in the group stage of a UEFA continental competition on 18 September 2014 in the opening match of the 2014–15 UEFA Europa League group stage against Etienne, playing the full match in a goalless draw.

Agolli was ever-present during the Europa League group stage campaign, as Qarabağ recorded one victory against Dnipro Dnipropetrivsk and two draws against Étienne and Inter Milan. In the final group match on 11 December 2014, Qarabağ drew 0–0 at home against Inter Milan, a result that eliminated them from the competition; Qarabağ required a victory to advance, but were overtaken after Dnipro defeated Etienne in the other group match. During the match, a late Qarabağ goal was disallowed for offside, a decision that was disputed by the club and reported by local media.

In the 2014–15 Azerbaijan Premier League, Agolli made 26 appearances. He missed several league matches during the early part of the season due to Qarabağ's participation in the 2014–15 UEFA Europa League group stage as the team lead the standings from the beginning of the championship and won the league title.

On 3 June 2015, Agolli played in the 2014–15 Azerbaijan Cup final as Qarabağ defeated Neftçi 3–1 to win the cup.

He was rated as the best defender of the 2014–15 season following his excellent running form and also was rated as the fourth best player overall.

At the end of the season, Agolli agreed a contract extension with Qarabağ, keeping him at the club until June 2016.

In the 2015–16 UEFA Champions League qualifying second round, Agolli assisted the only goal of the two-legged tie against Rudar Pljevlja, as Qarabağ progressed to the third round with a 1–0 aggregate victory.

In the third qualifying round, Agolli played the full 90 minutes in both legs against Celtic, as Qarabağ were eliminated 1–0 on aggregate.

Following their elimination from the Champions League, Qarabağ entered the play-off round of the 2015–16 UEFA Europa League qualifying against Young Boys, where Agolli played the full 90 minutes in both legs, as Qarabağ won the tie 4–0 on aggregate, qualifying for the group stage for the second consecutive season.

In the group stage of the 2015–16 UEFA Europa League, Agolli won a penalty for Qarabağ during the opening match against Tottenham Hotspur, which was converted by Richard Almeida for the opening goal in the 7th minute; Tottenham later overturned the deficit to secure a 3–1 victory.

Agolli played full matches in the remainder of group stage campaign, as the team recorded a 1–0 win against Anderlecht and a 1–1 draw with Monaco, but finished last in the group with four points.

On 22 April 2016, Agolli played his 228th match for the club across all competitions in the 2–0 home win against Inter Baku, becoming the foreign player with the most appearances for the club, surpassing the record of his compatriot Admir Teli.

In the 2015–16 Azerbaijan Premier League, Agolli made 24 league appearances, and on 2 May 2016, Qarabağ were confirmed as league champions for the third consecutive season, securing the title four matches before the end of the campaign.

On 26 May 2016 Agolli played in the 2015–16 Azerbaijan Cup final against Neftçi, and provided the assist for the winning goal in the 119th minute, as Qarabağ secured the trophy after extra time, completing a domestic double for the season.

In the 2016–17 UEFA Champions League qualifying, Agolli was a regular participant in the second and third qualifying rounds, where Qarabağ was eliminated by Viktoria Plzeň on away goals after a 1–1 aggregate draw.

In the 2016–17 UEFA Europa League qualifying play-off, Agolli played the full 90 minutes in both legs against IFK Göteborg, as Qarabağ won the tie 3–1 on aggregate to qualify for the Europa League group stage for the third consecutive season.

In the group stage of the 2016–17 UEFA Europa League, Agolli was nearly ever-present as Qarabağ began their campaign with a 2–2 draw against Slovan Liberec and later earned six points from wins over PAOK by 2–0 and 1–0, but however did not qualify for the knockout rounds.

Agolli was named the Foreign Player of the Year 2016 in Azerbaijan.

In the 2016–17 Azerbaijan Premier League, Agolli made 20 league appearances, playing nearly the full 90 minutes as left-back, with Qarabağ recording 13 clean sheets in those games, with the majority of those clean sheets coming in victories. as Qarabağ won the league title two weeks prior the end; it was their fourth consecutive championship won.

On 5 May 2017, Agolli played in the 2016–17 Azerbaijan Cup final with Qarabağ defeating Gabala 2–0, securing the club's second trophy of the 2016–17 season.

In the end of the 2016–17 season Agolli renewed his contract for another year.

In the 2017–18 UEFA Champions League qualifying, Agolli started by assisting a goal in the second qualifying round against Samtredia in a 5–0 victory, and following another victory in the second leg, Qarabağ advanced to the next round with a 6–0 aggregate score.

In the Third qualifying round second leg against Sheriff Tiraspol on 1 August 2017, Agolli provided 1 assist for the Míchel's goal in the 86th minute to help Qarabag win 2–1 and to qualify in the next round after aggregate 2–1.

On 15 August 2017, in the first leg of the 2017–18 UEFA Champions League qualifying play-off, Agolli played the full 90 minutes as Qarabağ defeated Copenhagen 1–0 at home.

In the second leg, Qarabağ lost 2–1 away to Copenhagen but advanced to the group stage on away goals, thus becoming the first team from Azerbaijan to reach the UEFA Champions League group stages.

Agolli missed Qarabağ's opening match of the 2017–18 UEFA Champions League group stage due to injury, making his competition debut in their subsequent fixture,, playing the full 90-minutes match at home against Roma, where Qarabağ lost 2–1.

Following his debut, Agolli played three full 90-minute matches for Qarabağ, featuring in two draws against Atlético Madrid (0–0 at home and 1–1 away; the club earned two points) and a 0–4 home defeat to Chelsea. In the latter match on 22 November 2017, Qarabağ played with ten men from the 19th minute following a red card to one of their players.

Agolli missed Qarabağ's final group-stage match against Roma due to injury, and the club was eliminated from the competition at the group stage.

Due to his commitments in the Champions League group stage, Agolli made 20 league appearances in the 2017–18 Azerbaijan Premier League, a period during which Qarabağ recorded a strong run of results, frequently keeping clean sheets; in the matches he featured, the team conceded a total of 11 goals.

On 27 October 2017, Agolli received the first red card of his career in Azerbaijan, being sent off after a second yellow card in the 43rd minute of Qarabağ's league match against Gabala; despite playing with ten men, Qarabağ went on to win the match 1–0.

On 23 April 2018, Qarabağ secured the league title for the fifth consecutive season following a 1–0 away victory over Sumgayit, with the club sealing the championship mathematically four rounds before the end of the season and holding a 17-point lead over second-placed Gabala.

On 30 April 2018, Agolli provided an assist in the final minutes of Qarabağ's 2–1 away victory against Zira, contributing directly to the winning goal.

On 14 June 2018, Agolli renewed his contract with Qarabağ, extending his stay at the club for a further season.

In the first round of the 2018–19 UEFA Champions League qualifying, Agolli featured in the last minutes of the second leg against Olimpija Ljubljana, as Qarabağ progressed to the next round with a 1–0 aggregate victory.

On 25 July 2018, in the first leg of the second qualifying round, Agolli played the full 90 minutes in a goalless draw against Albanian side Kukësi.

In the play-off round of the 2018–19 UEFA Europa League qualifying, on 23 August 2018, Agolli played in the final 18 minutes in Qarabağ's 1–0 away defeat to Sheriff Tiraspol.

In the 2018–19 Azerbaijan Premier League, Agolli made 11 appearances, accumulating approximately 772 minutes of playing time.

On 6 December 2018, Agolli was named in the Azerbaijan Premier League Team of the Week following a strong performance in Qarabağ's 5–1 home victory over Keşla.

In February 2019, Agolli was named the Azerbaijan Premier League Player of the Week after his performance in Qarabağ's 1–1 away draw against Sabah during matchday 18.

On 14 March 2019 Agolli was set to end his spell with Qarabağ and had reached an agreement to join New York Cosmos in the United States, with his farewell match scheduled against Sabail.

It was further reported that Agolli was expected to join New York Cosmos the following week.

=== New York Cosmos ===
On 25 March 2019 Agolli signed with the NPSL club New York Cosmos, and was initially set to participate with New York Cosmos B ahead of 2019 NPSL season and later with the first team in the inaugural NPSL Founders Cup tournament, scheduled to run between August and November 2019; he was given the squad number 13 upon arrival. He was highlighted as one of the newcomers expected to strengthen New York Cosmos B.

On 27 April 2019, Agolli made his debut for New York Cosmos B in a 2–0 victory over New York Athletic Club.

On 8 May 2019, Agolli provided an assist in the Lamar Hunt U.S. Open Cup, delivering a corner kick that was headed in by Bljedi Bardic in second-half stoppage time to secure a 2–1 first-round victory over Black Rock and advance New York Cosmos B to the second round.

Agolli was part of New York Cosmos B's defensive line during their unbeaten run in the NPSL season, featuring regularly at left back.

On 10 July 2019, Agolli scored his first goal in the United States in the 2019 NPSL North Atlantic Conference playoffs final between New York Cosmos B and Brooklyn Italians; the goal was the only one of the match, securing a 1–0 victory and earning him his first trophy in the United States.

On 21 July 2019, Agolli scored again in the Northeast Region Final for New York Cosmos B, netting in the 70th minute of the 3–1 victory over Baltimore to lift another trophy in the United States.

On 4 August 2019, Agolli scored in the NPSL final against Miami in the 31st minute, reducing the deficit after a free kick from just outside the penalty area, but the match however ended in a 3–1 loss; it was his third goal in four playoffs matches.

On 29 May 2020, Agolli re-signed with New York Cosmos ahead of the upcoming season, pending approval from the National Independent Soccer Association and the U.S. Soccer Federation.

On 2 August 2020, Agolli scored in the opening match of the 2020 NISA Independent Cup, netting a free kick in the 27th minute in a 1–1 draw against New Amsterdam.

Agolli made six other appearances for New York Cosmos during the 2020 NISA Independent Cup, scoring one goal and providing two assists across 540 minutes of play.

== International career ==
Agolli debuted in international level with Albania U21 on 11 October 2002 in a UEFA Euro 2004 Under-21 qualification match against Switzerland U21, which ended in a goalless draw. He went on to make a total of six appearances during the campaign, as Albania finished third in a five-team group.

Agolli made his debut for the Albania senior team on 3 September 2005 in a 2006 FIFA World Cup qualifier match against Kazakhstan, coming on as a half-time substitute.

In 2008 after returning to KF Tirana, Agolli became a regular member of the Albania squad in the 2010 FIFA World Cup qualification, establishing himself as a starter under coach Arie Haan, playing the majority of the qualifiers as full 90-minutes, where he was deployed initially as a left-back and then as a left-midfielder.

He scored his first international goal on 10 June 2009 in a friendly match against Georgia. He scored his second international goal on 12 August 2009 in a 6–1 friendly win against Cyprus, a match that stands as one of Albania's largest victories.

In the post-qualification period, Agolli played in nearly every minute of Albania's subsequent friendly matches, during which the team did not concede a goal in five consecutive games, equalling its 5-matches clean-sheet record for the second time.

During the UEFA Euro 2012 qualifying, Agolli assisted the late equaliser in Albania's opening match, a 1–1 draw against Romania on 3 September 2010. He then played two other consecutive full matches in campaign as Albania defeated Luxembourg 1–0 and earned a further 1–1 draw the following month, thus extending its unbeaten run of eight consecutive matches, equalling the national team record set in 1999–2000.

=== UEFA Euro 2016 historical qualification for finals ===
During the UEFA Euro 2016 qualifying, under coach Gianni De Biasi, Agolli played in every match from the opening fixture through the penultimate one, missing the final match through suspension after accumulating three yellow cards. The campaign opened with a surprise 1–0 away win against Portugal in Aveiro on 7 September 2014. The following month, Albania's away match against Serbia was abandoned after 41 minutes because of crowd disorder and later awarded 3–0 to Albania by the Court of Arbitration for Sport in July 2015. Victories over Armenia and two draws against Denmark helped Albania finish second in the group and qualify automatically for UEFA Euro 2016, the nation's first major international tournament.

On 16 November 2015, aged 33, Agolli captained Albania for the first time in his 58th appearance, playing the full 90 minutes in a 2–2 home draw against Georgia at Qemal Stafa Stadium.

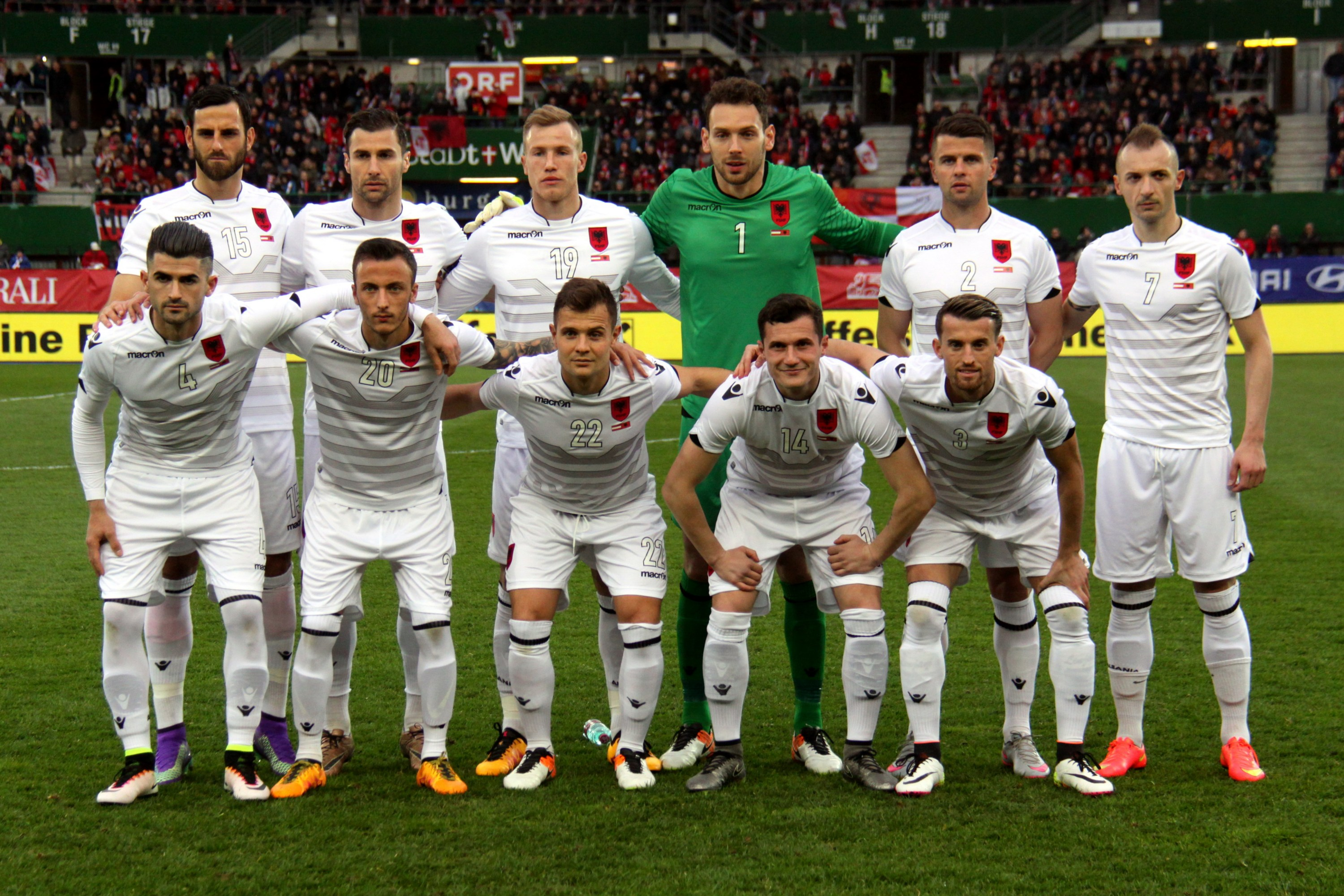
Agolli (#7) lining up with Albania against Austria in 2016.

On 21 May 2016, Agolli was named in Albania's preliminary 27-man squad for UEFA Euro 2016, before being included in the final 23-man squad on 31 May.

Albania made its major-tournament debut on 11 June 2016 against Switzerland in the opening Group A match, with Agolli playing the full 90 minutes in a 1–0 defeat. Albania conceded in the fifth minute and played with 10 men after captain Lorik Cana was sent off in the 36th minute. With Cana suspended, Agolli captained Albania in the second match against hosts France on 15 June, playing another full match as Albania lost 2–0 after conceding twice late on. He also captained the side in the final group match against Romania on 19 June, completing another 90 minutes in Albania's 1–0 victory, secured by a goal from Armando Sadiku. Albania finished third in the group with three points and a goal difference of −2, but were eliminated after finishing last among the third-placed teams.

=== Post–Euro 2016 ===
Following Cana's retirement after Euro 2016, Agolli became regular captain ahead of the 2018 FIFA World Cup qualification. He scored his third international goal on 2 September 2017 in a World Cup qualifier 2–0 win against Liechtenstein, which also marked the debut of new head coach Christian Panucci.

After qualification campaign, coach Panucci omitted Agolli from the squad for upcoming matches, stating that at 36 years old — and set to be 38 by the time of the UEFA Euro 2020 qualifying campaign — he was seeking younger alternatives, though he said he had discussed the situation with Agolli and would consider him if needed.

In September 2018, Agolli was recalled to the national team and as a captain ahead of the UEFA Nations League inaugural season. He appeared on the bench in the 2–0 loss to Scotland, which was also his last international appearance.

By the end of his international career, Agolli had earned 73 caps, placing him joint-sixth for most appearances for Albania.

== Post-playing career ==
After his retirement, Agolli, together with his former New York Cosmos teammate Bljedi Bardic, founded AB7 Future Soccer Academy in Castleton Corners, Staten Island. The academy focuses not only on developing footballing skills but also on promoting core values associated with the sport, including physical fitness, teamwork, discipline, and resilience, as part of players’ overall development.

In June 2024, Agolli was appointed head coach of the Westchester U-16 team in the United States.

== Personal life ==
Following Albania's historic participation at UEFA Euro 2016, Agolli was among the members of the national team who were issued diplomatic passports by the Albanian government in recognition of their achievement.

In May 2018, Agolli became a father for the first time, as his partner Rea gave birth to their son Blodin Brooklyn Agolli in NYU Langone Health, New York. The couple had been together for more than a decade at the time.

== Career statistics ==
=== Club ===
As of 28 September 2020

Appearances and goals by club, season and competition
Club	Season	League			Cup		Continental (Note: Includes UEFA Champions League and UEFA Europa League.)		Other		Total	
Club	Season	Division	Apps	Goals	Apps	Goals	Apps	Goals	Apps	Goals	Apps	Goals
Tirana	2000–01	Kategoria Superiore	1	0	0	0	—		—		1	0
Tirana	2001–02	Kategoria Superiore	3	0	2	3	—		—		5	3
Tirana	2002–03	Kategoria Superiore	6	0	0	0	1 (Note: Appearance(s) in UEFA Cup)	0	1 (Note: Appearance in Albanian Supercup)	0	8	0
Tirana	2003–04	Kategoria Superiore	23	1	0	0	1 (Note: Appearance(s) in UEFA Champions League)	1	1	1	25	4
Tirana	2004–05	Kategoria Superiore	31	4	0	0	2	0	0	0	33	4
Tirana	Total		64	5	2	3	4	1	2	1	72	9
Apolonia Fier (loan)	2002–03	Kategoria Superiore	12	1	0	0	—		—		12	1
Neuchâtel Xamax	2005–06	Swiss Super League	29	3	2	1	1 (Note: Appearance(s) in UEFA Intertoto Cup)	0	—		32	4
Luzern	2006–07	Swiss Super League	8	0	0	0	—		—		8	0
VPS	2007	Veikkausliiga	18	0	0	0	—		—		18	0
VPS	2008	Veikkausliiga	15	1	0	0	—		—		15	1
VPS	Total		33	1	0	0	—		—		33	1
Tirana	2008–09	Kategoria Superiore	30	5	7	0	—		—		37	5
Kryvbas Kryvyi Rih	2009–10	Ukrainian Premier League	13	0	0	0	—		—		13	0
Qarabağ	2010–11	Azerbaijan Premier League	31	0	1	0	6 (Note: Appearance(s) in UEFA Europa League)	0	—		38	0
Qarabağ	2011–12	Azerbaijan Premier League	31	1	4	0	6	1	—		41	2
Qarabağ	2012–13	Azerbaijan Premier League	27	1	4	0	—		—		31	1
Qarabağ	2013–14	Azerbaijan Premier League	34	1	2	0	8	0	—		44	1
Qarabağ	2014–15	Azerbaijan Premier League	26	0	4	0	12 (Note: Four appearances in UEFA Champions League; eight appearances in UEFA Europa League)	0	—		42	0
Qarabağ	2015–16	Azerbaijan Premier League	24	0	4	0	11 (Note: Four appearances in UEFA Champions League; seven appearances in UEFA Europa League)	0	0	0	39	0
Qarabağ	2016–17	Azerbaijan Premier League	21	0	3	0	12	0	—		36	0
Qarabağ	2017–18	Azerbaijan Premier League	19	0	0	0	10	0	—		29	0
Qarabağ	2018–19	Azerbaijan Premier League	11	0	2	0	4 (Note: Two appearances in UEFA Champions League; two appearances in UEFA Europa League)	0	—		17	0
Qarabağ	Total		224	3	24	0	69	1	0	0	317	4
New York Cosmos B	2019	NPSL	9	0	2	0	—		12 (Note: Four appearances in NPSL playoffs; eight appearances in the NPSL Members Cup)	3 (Note: Three goals in NPSL playoffs)	23	3
New York Cosmos	2020–21	NISA	7 (Note: Appearances and goals during the 2020–21 National Independent Soccer Association season)	2	0	0	—		0	0	7	2
Career total			429	20	37	4	74	1	14	4	535	30

=== International ===
Appearances and goals by national team and year
National team	Year	Apps	Goals
Albania	2005	1	0
Albania	2006	1	0
Albania	2007	0	0
Albania	2008	5	0
Albania	2009	7	2
Albania	2010	9	0
Albania	2011	8	0
Albania	2012	6	0
Albania	2013	8	0
Albania	2014	8	0
Albania	2015	5	0
Albania	2016	10	0
Albania	2017	5	1
Total		73	3

Scores and results list Albania's goal tally first, score column indicates score after each Agolli goal.

List of international goals scored by Ansi Agolli
No.	Date	Venue	Opponent	Score	Result	Competition
1	10 June 2009	Qemal Stafa Stadium, Tirana, Albania	Georgia	1–1	1–1	Friendly
2	12 August 2009	Qemal Stafa Stadium, Tirana, Albania	Cyprus	5–1	6–1	Friendly
3	2 September 2017	Elbasan Arena, Elbasan, Albania	Liechtenstein	2–0	2–0	2018 FIFA World Cup qualification

== Honours ==
Tirana

- Kategoria Superiore: 2003–04, 2004–05, 2008–09
- Albanian Cup: 2000–01, 2001–02
- Albanian Supercup: 2000, 2002, 2003

Qarabağ

- Azerbaijan Premier League: 2013–14, 2014–15, 2015–16, 2016–17, 2017–18
- Azerbaijan Cup: 2014–15, 2015–16, 2016–17

Individual

- Qarabağ Player of the Season: 2014–15

Sporting positions
Preceded by Lorik Cana	Albania captain 2016–2017	Succeeded by Etrit Berisha
