= Burim Kukeli =

Albanian footballer (born 1984)

Personal information
- Full name: Burim Nue Kukeli
- Date of birth: 16 January 1984 (age 42)
- Place of birth: Gjakove, Yugoslavia
- Height: 1.80 m (5 ft 11 in)
- Position: Defensive midfielder

Team information
- Current team: Zürich II

Youth career
- 1994–2003: Solothurn
- 2003–2004: Wangen bei Olten
- 2004–2005: Zofingen

Senior career*
| Years | Team | Apps | (Gls) |
| 2004–2005 | Zofingen | 21 | (4) |
| 2005–2007 | Schötz | 48 | (14) |
| 2008–2012 | Luzern | 103 | (3) |
| 2008–2009 | Luzern U21 | 3 | (0) |
| 2012–2017 | Zürich | 82 | (2) |
| 2017–2019 | Sion | 13 | (0) |
| 2019–2021 | Kriens | 44 | (0) |
| Total | | 314 | (23) |

International career
| 2012–2017 | Albania | 27 | (0) |

Managerial career
- 2020: Kriens (player-assistant manager)
- 2021–2022: Wil (assistant)
- 2022: Sion (assistant)
- 2023: Grasshopper II
- 2023–2024: Grasshopper (assistant)
- 2025–: Zürich II
- * Club domestic league appearances and goals

Burim Nue Kukeli (born 16 January 1984) is a former professional footballer who played as a defensive midfielder. He is coach of FC Zürich's under-21 team. Born in Yugoslavia, he represented Albania internationally.

A Zofingen product, Kukeli started his professional career in the 2004–05 season where he played 24 matches before earning a transfer to Schötz where he played in the next two seasons. In 2008, he joined Luzern where he made more than 100 top flight appearances. Between 2012 and 2017, he played more than 80 league matches for Zürich. However, his spell was marred by injuries. In 2017, he joined Sion, also in the top flight.

An Albanian international, Kukeli has more than 20 caps to his name after making his debut in 2012. He also was part of UEFA Euro 2016 squad.

== Club career ==
=== Early career ===
Kukeli was born in Gjakova, Kosovo in the then Socialist Federal Republic of Yugoslavia, but moved to Switzerland at the age of four following his father road along with other part of his family. He started his youth career aged 9 with the Solothurn youth academies. Later he was in the squad of Wangen bei Olten and SC Zofingen.

=== Zofingen ===
With Zofingen he played 21 matches and scored 4 goals during the 2004–05 season of the Swiss 3rd league. He also managed to play a full 90-minutes match, valid for the Swiss Cup against Schaffhausen, finished in the 1–5 loss.

=== Schötz ===
Kukeli moved to FC Schötz during the 2005 summer transfers window. In the 2005–06 season of the 1. Liga Promotion (Swiss 3rd league) he played in total 11 matches, all as a starter and in only 1 substituted off, also he scored 4 goals while Schötz were relegated to the 1. Liga Classic, Swiss 4th league, for the next season.

Kukeli missed out the entire 2006–07 season of 1. Liga Classic due to a long injury. Schötz were promoted again in the 1. Liga Promotion.

During the 2007–08 season first half Kukeli made it 14 Appearances and scored 2 goals. He played 1 match in the Swiss cup against Mendrisio, which finished in the 3–1 loss, where Kukeli himself played a full 90-minutes match.

=== Luzern ===
In January 2008, Luzern completed the transfer of Kukeli. He made his first Swiss Super League debut at the age of 23 and finished second part of 2007–08 season with 10 appearances.

He suffered an injury which kept him out of play from the first half of the 2008–09 season. He played first match of the 2008–09 season only in the second half when he came in as a substitute in the 85th minute for Davide Chiumiento in the 2–3 loss against Young Boys on 15 February 2009. The second and last match of that season came on 30 May 2009 when he played as a starter in the 2–1 victory against Neuchâtel Xamax.

=== Zürich ===
On 15 April 2012, Kukeli completed a transfer to Zürich, rejoining his former Luzern boss Rolf Fringer. The transfer was set to be official on 1 July. Kukelli officially signed a contract until June 2015. He took squad number 20 and made his competitive debut on 15 July 2012 in the opening matchday of 2012–13 season against Luzern. He played 13 matches during the campaign, including one in cup.

On 3 February 2013, during the friendly against AC Bellinzona, Kukeli suffered a major injury after a challenge with Simon Grether, which resulted Kukeli injured with a tibia and fibula fracture in the leg. More than two weeks later, medical staff announced that Kukeli would be sidelined for the next nine months. He returned in training in January of the following year, and played his first match also that month as he appeared in a friendly versus MSV Duisburg which was an indicator for the player that he was not fully fit.

In April 2014, Kukeli undergo surgery again as the club had failed to treat his condition appropriately. On 11 June 2014, manager Urs Meier stated that Kukeli was ready to get back to action along with his teammate Alain Nef, who was also suffering from a long-time injury.

He made his first competitive appearance after 21 months on 20 July 2014 in the first day of 2014–15 Swiss Super League, assisting the lone goal of the match. Later on, in the 4–1 defeat at Basel, Kukeli had damaged legs' muscle and remained outside for 3 weeks. He returned on 31 August in the match against St. Gallen, and scored his maiden goal on 5 October in the 3–0 comfortable win over Vaduz.

Kukeli was sold to fellow top flight side Sion in July 2017. His last Zürich match on 30 July against Thun was also his 100th for the club in all competitions. During his 5-year spell, Kukeli managed to make 82 league appearances, in addition 7 cup appearances, and 11 Europa League appearances. He also scored two times, both in league.

=== Sion ===
On 9 August 2017, Sion and Zürich reached an agreement for the transfer of Kukeli for €200,000. He signed a contract until June 2019. There he found his Albania teammate Ermir Lenjani and ex assistant manager Paolo Tramezzani.

=== Kriens ===
SC Kriens announced on 18 June 2019, that Kukeli had joined the club on a 1-year contract.

== International career ==
Kukeli received his first call-up to the Albania national team from manager Gianni de Biasi for the friendlies against Qatar and Iran in May 2012, but declined the invitation, citing fatigue after the end of the season. In August 2012, the Albanian government began procedures to grant him citizenship, enabling him to represent Albania in the 2014 FIFA World Cup qualifiers. He received Albanian citizenship on 4 September 2012, becoming eligible to play for the national team.

Kukeli made his competitive debut in the opening match of the 2014 World Cup qualifiers, playing the full match in a 3–1 home win over Cyprus on 7 September 2012. He started Albania's next three qualifiers before a muscle injury sustained in a league match for Zürich against Basel on 28 October 2012 ruled him out for the remainder of the qualifying campaign. Albania finished fifth in Group E, with 11 points from ten matches.

He returned to the national team in September 2014 for the UEFA Euro 2016 qualifiers. He featured in Albania's historic 1–0 away win over Portugal in the opening match and went on to make six further appearances in the qualifying campaign as Albania secured its first qualification for a major men's international tournament, UEFA Euro 2016.

On 21 May 2016, Kukeli was named in Albania's preliminary 27-man squad for UEFA Euro 2016, before being included in the final 23-man squad on 31 May.

He made his European Championship debut on 11 June 2016, playing the full match in Albania's 1–0 defeat to Switzerland in the opening Group A fixture. He also played in the second match against hosts France on 15 June, but was substituted in the 73rd minute as Albania lost 2–0. After receiving a yellow card in each of the first two matches, Kukeli was suspended for the final group fixture against Romania, which Albania won 1–0. Albania finished third in the group with three points and a goal difference of −2, but were eliminated after finishing last among the third-placed teams.

== Coaching career ==
On 12 January 2023, he was announced as the new coach of Grasshopper Club Zürich's U21 squad, who play in the Swiss 1st League, the fourth tier of the Swiss football pyramid.

On 21 July 2023, he joined the coaching staff of the first squad of GC, assisting head coach Bruno Berner.

On 27 May 2025, he was announced as the new coach of FC Zürich's under-21 squad.

== Style of play ==
Kukeli's natural position is defensive midfielder, but can also be deployed as centre-back.

== Personal life ==
Following Albania's historic participation at UEFA Euro 2016, Kukeli was among the members of the national team who were issued diplomatic passports by the Albanian government in recognition of their achievement.

On 1 November 2016, Kukeli confirmed that he had become the father to twins.

== Career statistics ==
=== Club ===
As of 9 December 2017

Appearances and goals by club, season and competition
| Club | Season | League | | | Cup | | Europe | | Total | |
| Club | Season | Division | Apps | Goals | Apps | Goals | Apps | Goals | Apps | Goals |
|---|---|---|---|---|---|---|---|---|---|---|
| Zofingen | 2004–05 | 1. Liga Promotion | 21 | 4 | 1 | 0 | — | | 22 | 4 |
| Schötz | 2005–06 | 1. Liga Promotion | 11 | 4 | 0 | 0 | — | | 11 | 4 |
| Schötz | 2006–07 | 1. Liga Classic | 23 | 8 | 1 | 0 | — | | 24 | 8 |
| Schötz | 2007–08 | 1. Liga Promotion | 15 | 2 | 1 | 0 | — | | 16 | 2 |
| Schötz | Total | | 48 | 14 | 2 | 0 | — | | 50 | 14 |
| Luzern | 2007–08 | Swiss Super League | 10 | 0 | 0 | 0 | — | | 10 | 0 |
| Luzern | 2008–09 | Swiss Super League | 2 | 0 | 0 | 0 | — | | 2 | 0 |
| Luzern | 2009–10 | Swiss Super League | 34 | 2 | 2 | 0 | — | | 34 | 6 |
| Luzern | 2010–11 | Swiss Super League | 27 | 0 | 1 | 0 | 2 (Note: All appearance(s) in UEFA Europa League) | 0 | 31 | 0 |
| Luzern | 2011–12 | Swiss Super League | 29 | 1 | 5 | 0 | — | | 37 | 1 |
| Luzern | Total | | 103 | 3 | 8 | 0 | 2 | 0 | 113 | 3 |
| Luzern U21 | 2007–08 | 1. Liga Promotion | 2 | 0 | 0 | 0 | — | | 2 | 0 |
| Luzern U21 | 2008–09 | 1. Liga Promotion | 1 | 0 | 0 | 0 | — | | 1 | 0 |
| Luzern U21 | Total | | 3 | 0 | 0 | 0 | — | | 3 | 0 |
| Zürich | 2012–13 | Swiss Super League | 12 | 0 | 1 | 0 | — | | 13 | 0 |
| Zürich | 2013–14 | Swiss Super League | 0 | 0 | 0 | 0 | — | | 0 | 0 |
| Zürich | 2014–15 | Swiss Super League | 21 | 1 | 0 | 0 | 5 | 0 | 26 | 1 |
| Zürich | 2015–16 | Swiss Super League | 22 | 1 | 3 | 0 | 1 | 0 | 26 | 1 |
| Zürich | 2016–17 | Swiss Challenge League | 25 | 0 | 3 | 0 | 5 | 0 | 33 | 0 |
| Zürich | 2017–18 | Swiss Super League | 2 | 0 | 0 | 0 | — | | 2 | 0 |
| Zürich | Total | | 82 | 2 | 7 | 0 | 11 | 0 | 100 | 3 |
| Sion | 2017–18 | Swiss Super League | 9 | 0 | 1 | 0 | — | | 10 | 0 |
| Career total | | | 266 | 23 | 19 | 0 | 13 | 0 | 298 | 23 |

=== International ===
As of 5 September 2017

Appearances and goals by national team and year
| National team | Year | Apps | Goals |
|---|---|---|---|
| Albania | 2012 | 4 | 0 |
| Albania | 2013 | 0 | 0 |
| Albania | 2014 | 5 | 0 |
| Albania | 2015 | 4 | 0 |
| Albania | 2016 | 8 | 0 |
| Albania | 2017 | 6 | 0 |
| Total | | 27 | 0 |

== Honours ==
FC Luzern

- Swiss Super League runner-up: 2011–12
- Swiss Cup runner-up: 2011–12

FC Zürich

- Swiss Cup: 2013–14, 2015–16
