= 2012–13 Grasshopper Club Zurich season =

Grasshopper Club Zurich
2012–13 season
- Chairman: André Dosé
- Manager: Uli Forte
- Stadium: Letzigrund, Zürich, Switzerland
- Super League: 2nd
- Swiss Cup: Winner
- Top goalscorer: Izet Hajrović (8)
- Highest home attendance: 18'400 2 December 2012 v Zürich (league)
- Lowest home attendance: 4'050 4 May 2013 v Servette (league)
- Average home league attendance: 8'600

== Review and events ==
The 2012–13 Swiss Super League began with a 0–2 loss against FC Sion. After this defeat the Grasshoppers remained unbeaten for twelve consecutive matches and goalkeeper Roman Bürki was able to set a new all-time record in keeping a clean sheet in Swiss football. He remained unbeaten for 659 minutes.

On May 20, 2013, the Grasshoppers won the 2012–13 Swiss Cup by a 5-4-victory on penalties against FC Basel. It was Grasshoppers 19th title in this competition and their first since 1994.

== Matches ==
=== Legend ===
Win Draw Loss Postponed

=== Friendly matches ===
==== Preseason ====
16 June 2012	Grasshopper Club Zurich (Switzerland)	1 – 3	(Switzerland) FC Wil	Niederhasli
17:00 CEST	Mustafi 85'	(Report) (in German)	79', 80', 82' Jahović	Stadium: GC-Campus; Attendance: 400; Referee: Pascal Erlachner

20 June 2012	Grasshopper Club Zurich (Switzerland)	0 – 1	(Liechtenstein) FC Vaduz	Flums
18:00 CEST		(Report) (in German)	86' Hasler	Stadium: Sportplatz Banau; Attendance: 500; Referee: Nikolaj Hänni

23 June 2012	FC Thun (Switzerland)	0 – 1	(Switzerland) Grasshopper Club Zurich	Thörishaus
15:30 CEST		(Report) (in German)	65' (pen.) Vilotić	Stadium: Sportplatz Stucki; Attendance: 600

30 June 2012	FC Wohlen (Switzerland)	2 – 6	(Switzerland) Grasshopper Club Zurich	Niederwil AG
18:00 CEST	Weller 18'; Bijelic 25'	(Report) (in German)	20', 48' Zuber; 55', 78' Paiva; 64', 85' Lang	Stadium: Sportanlage Riedmatten

5 July 2012	Grasshopper Club Zurich (Switzerland)	1 – 2	(Germany) TSV 1860 München	Niederhasli
18:30 CEST	Gashi 7'	(Report) (in German)	17' Stoppelkamp; 22' Wojtkowiak	Stadium: GC-Campus; Attendance: 850; Referee: Fedayi San

7 July 2012	Grasshopper Club Zurich (Switzerland)	2 – 1	(Belgium) Standard Liège	Niederhasli
20:00 CEST	Ben Khalifa 27'; Paiva 75'	(Report) (in German)	81' Batshuayi	Stadium: GC-Campus; Attendance: 1'150; Referee: Sascha Amhof

==== Mid-season (fall) ====
15 August 2012	Grasshopper Club Zurich (Switzerland)	3 – 0	(Switzerland) FC Wohlen	Niederhasli
17:00 CEST	Viera 30'; Viera 31'; Hajrović 64'	(Report) (in German)		Stadium: GC-Campus; Attendance: 300; Referee: Pascal Erlachner

29 August 2012	FC Thalwil (Switzerland)	0 – 4	(Switzerland) Grasshopper Club Zurich	Thalwil
18:00 CEST		(Report) (in German)	1' Adili; 12' (pen.) Mustafi; 30' Brahimi; 69' Paiva	Stadium: Etzliberg; Attendance: 600; Referee: Lukas Fähndrich

7 September 2012	Grasshopper Club Zurich (Switzerland)	0 – 3	(Switzerland) FC Lugano	Niederhasli
17:00 CEST		(Report) (in German)	17' Bottani; 37' Bebeto; 46' (pen.) Garcia	Stadium: GC-Campus; Attendance: 450; Referee: Patrick Winter

12 October 2012	Grasshopper Club Zurich (Switzerland)	1 – 3	(Switzerland) FC Winterthur	Niederhasli
15:00 CEST	Lang 21'	(Report) (in German)	5' Ben Katanha; 40' Lüscher; 72' Freuler	Stadium: GC-Campus; Attendance: 200; Referee: Fedayi San

24 October 2012	Grasshopper Club Zurich (Switzerland)	3 – 1	(Switzerland) FC Freienbach	Niederhasli
19:15 CET	Gashi 16'; Krasniqi 63'; Mustafi 85'	(Report) (in German)	67' Forrer	Stadium: GC-Campus; Referee: Alex Kern

7 November 2012	Grasshopper Club Zurich (Switzerland)	5 – 0	(Switzerland) SC YF Juventus	Niederhasli
18:00 CET	Paiva 38', 62'; Zuber 47', 68'; Hajrović 65'	(Report) (in German)		Stadium: GC-Campus; Attendance: 400; Referee: Patrick Winter

==== Winter break ====
9 January 2013	Grasshopper Club Zurich (Switzerland)	4 – 1	(Switzerland) FC Wil	Niederhasli
16:00 CET	Anatole 9'; Zuber 20'; Coulibaly 60'; Gashi 70'	(Report) (in German)	36' Mouangue	Stadium: GC-Campus; Attendance: 250; Referee: Fedayi San

15 January 2013	Grasshopper Club Zurich (Switzerland)	3 – 2	(Switzerland) FC Luzern	Niederhasli
14:00 CET	Lang 30'; Gashi 41'; Paiva 66'	(Report) (in German)	15' Rangelov; 37' Muntwiler	Stadium: GC-Campus; Attendance: 200; Referee: Sascha Amhof

21 January 2013	Jomo Cosmos (South Africa)	0 – 4	(Switzerland) Grasshopper Club Zurich	Cape Town, South Africa
15:00 CET		(Report) (in German)	Feltscher 32'; Lang 34'; Abrashi 47'; Anatole 54'	Stadium: Cape Town Stadium; Attendance: 100

26 January 2013	Ajax Cape Town F.C. (South Africa)	2 – 1	(Switzerland) Grasshopper Club Zurich	Cape Town, South Africa
15:00 CET	Gülen 55' (o.g.); Losper 60'	(Report) (in German)	Toko 54'	Stadium: Cape Town Stadium; Attendance: 200

2 February 2013	Grasshopper Club Zurich (Switzerland)	0 – 0	(Switzerland) FC Lausanne-Sport	Niederhasli
14:00 CET		(Report) (in German)		Stadium: GC-Campus; Attendance: 400

6 February 2013	FC Schaffhausen (Switzerland)	3 – 2	(Switzerland) Grasshopper Club Zurich	Schaffhausen
14:30 CET	Frontino 8', 31'; Gül 70'	(Report) (in German)	16' Paiva; 17' Coulibaly	Stadium: Kunstrasenplatz Bühl; Attendance: 150; Referee: Pascal Erlachner

==== Mid-season (spring) ====
22 March 2013	Grasshopper Club Zurich (Switzerland)	3 – 2	(Switzerland) FC Wohlen	Niederhasli
15:00 CET	Gashi 42'; Zuber 63'; Anatole 69'	(Report) (in German)	1', 37' Gaspar	Stadium: GC-Campus; Attendance: 100; Referee: Sandro Schärer

27 March 2013	Grasshopper Club Zurich (Switzerland)	5 – 0	(Switzerland) Zug 94	Niederhasli
18:00 CET	Zuber 6'; Anatole 27'; Coulibaly 50'; Bauer 62'; Paiva 75'	(Report) (in German)		Stadium: GC-Campus; Attendance: 100; Referee: Sascha Amhof

==== Tournaments ====
===== 3-Städte-Turnier Uster =====
Game duration 45 min

26 June 2012	Selection Zürich Oberland (Switzerland)	0 – 5	(Switzerland) Grasshopper Club Zurich	Uster
19:00 CEST		(Report) (in German)	7', 9' Ben Khalifa; 33' Paiva; 45' (pen.) Feltscher; 45' Vilotić	Stadium: Buchholz

26 June 2012	FC Winterthur (Switzerland)	2 – 0	(Switzerland) Grasshopper Club Zurich	Uster
20:00 CEST	Bengondo 8'; Kuzmanović 19' (pen.)	(Report) (in German)		Stadium: Buchholz

===== Tournament Horgen =====
Game duration 45 min

12 September 2012	FC Horgen (Switzerland)	0 – 9	(Switzerland) Grasshopper Club Zurich	Horgen
18:30 CEST		(Report) (in German)	3', 11', 34' Paiva; 19', 24', 26', 36' Mustafi; 22' Xhaka; 33' Brahimi	Stadium: Waldegg; Attendance: 400; Referee: Fedayi San

12 September 2012	Grasshopper Club Zurich (Switzerland)	1 – 1 (5–3 p)	(Switzerland) FC Wil	Horgen
19:30	Paiva 20' (pen.)	(Report) (in German)	19' Jahović	Stadium: Waldegg; Attendance: 500; Referee: Fedayi San
	Penalties
	Adili (penalty scored); Maroufi (penalty missed); Tarashaj (penalty scored); Gülen (penalty scored); Vilotić (penalty scored)		(penalty missed) Jahović; (penalty missed) Božić; (penalty scored) Afsarli; (penalty scored) Madou

===== Hallenmasters 2013 =====
Game duration 2x12 min (indoor tournament)

13 January 2013	Grasshopper Club Zurich (Switzerland)	1 – 5	(Liechtenstein) FC Vaduz	Winterthur
13:00 CET	Zuber	(Report) (in German)	Maccoppi; Oehri; N. Hasler; Hassell	Stadium: Eishalle Deutweg; Attendance: 2'500

13 January 2013	FC Winterthur (Switzerland)	2 – 1	(Switzerland) Grasshopper Club Zurich	Winterthur
14:00 CET		(Report) (in German)	Brahimi	Stadium: Eishalle Deutweg; Attendance: 2'500

13 January 2013	FC Wil (Switzerland)	2 – 2 (7 – 6 p)	(Switzerland) Grasshopper Club Zurich	Winterthur
15:35 CET	Borges 11'; Audino 22'	(Report) (in German)	13' Herlea; 19' Gülen	Stadium: Eishalle Deutweg; Attendance: 2'500
	Penalties
	Zuber (penalty scored); Xhaka (penalty scored); Brahimi (penalty scored); Gülen (penalty scored); Massaro (penalty scored); Bauer (penalty scored); Meyer (penalty missed)		(penalty scored) Muslin; (penalty scored) Lüchinger; (penalty scored) Božić; (penalty scored) Audino; (penalty scored) Holenstein; (penalty scored) Mouangue; (penalty scored) Borges

=== Super League ===
Kickoff times are in CET

==== League results and fixtures ====
15 July 2012 1	Grasshopper Club Zurich	0 – 2	FC Sion	Zürich
13:45	Ben Khalifa (yellow card) 85'	(Report) (in German)	39', 77' Léo; (yellow card) 40' Gattuso	Stadium: Letzigrund; Attendance: 7'900; Referee: Stephan Klossner

22 July 2012 2	BSC Young Boys	0 – 1	Grasshopper Club Zurich	Bern
13:45	Lecjaks (yellow card) 38'; Vitkieviez (yellow card) 84'	(Report) (in German)	(yellow card) 27' Vilotić; 84' Salatić	Stadium: Stade de Suisse; Attendance: 18'711; Referee: Damien Carrel

28 July 2012 3	Grasshopper Club Zurich	2 – 2	FC Basel	Zürich
19:45	Ben Khalifa 29', (yellow card) 78'; Brahimi 82'	(Report) (in German)	15' A. Frei; (yellow card) 24' Cabral; (yellow card) 42' Zoua; 47' Yapi	Stadium: Letzigrund; Attendance: 7'050; Referee: Sascha Amhof

4 August 2012 4	FC St. Gallen	1 – 1	Grasshopper Club Zurich	St. Gallen
19:45	Pa Modou (yellow card) 14'; Nushi (yellow card) 18'; Mutsch (yellow card) 72'; Čavušević (yellow card) 80'; Nater (yellow card) 82'; Abegglen 90'	(Report) (in German)	(red card) 22' Vilotić; 26' Hajrović; (yellow card) 82' Bürki; (yellow card) 89' Feltscher	Stadium: AFG Arena; Attendance: 15'677; Referee: Patrick Graf

12 August 2012 5	Grasshopper Club Zurich	1 – 0	Servette FC	Zürich
13:45	Ben Khalifa 51'; Toko 67'	(Report) (in German)	(yellow card) 41' Kusunga; (yellow card) 66' Kouassi	Stadium: Letzigrund; Attendance: 6'050; Referee: Stephan Studer

19 August 2012 6	FC Luzern	0 – 2	Grasshopper Club Zurich	Lucerne
16:00		(Report) (in German)	4', (yellow card) 57' Zuber; (yellow card) 66' Ben Khalifa; 79' Abrashi; (yellow card) 90' Bürki	Stadium: swissporarena Attendance: 11'083; Referee: Ludovic Gremaud

25 August 2012 7	Grasshopper Club Zurich	1 – 0	FC Thun	Zürich
19:45	Vilotić (yellow card) 39'; Hajrović 44'	(Report) (in German)	(yellow card) 31' Ghezal; (yellow card) 60' Ferreira; (yellow card) 67' Hediger	Stadium: Letzigrund; Attendance: 4'950; Referee: Nikolaj Hänni

1 September 2012 8	FC Lausanne-Sport	0 – 2	Grasshopper Club Zurich	Lausanne
19:45	Katz (yellow card) 13'; Sanogo Jr. (yellow card) 18'; Roux (yellow card) 39'; Sonnerat (yellow card) 84'	(Report) (in German)	(yellow card) 33' Zuber; 49' Vilotić; (yellow card) 65' Toko; (yellow card) 72' Salatić; (yellow card) 84' Hajrović; (yellow card) 90+3' Grichting; 90+4', (yellow card) 90+4' Abrashi	Stadium: Stade Olympique de la Pontaise; Attendance: 5'800; Referee: Alain Bieri (Solothurn)

22 September 2012 9	FC Zürich	0 – 1	Grasshopper Club Zurich	Zürich
19:45	Béda (yellow card) 90+1'	(Report) (in German)	(yellow card) 51' Salatić; 54' Zuber; (yellow card) 76' Pavlović; (yellow card) 90+4' Xhaka	Stadium: Letzigrund; Attendance: 17'358; Referee: Nikolaj Hänni

27 September 2012 10	Grasshopper Club Zurich	2 – 0	FC Luzern	Zürich
19:45	Toko 57'; Lang 72'	(Report) (in German)		Stadium: Letzigrund; Attendance: 5'400; Referee: Daniel Wermelinger

1 October 2012 11	Grasshopper Club Zurich	1 – 0	FC St. Gallen	Zürich
19:45	Pavlović (yellow card) 33'; Ben Khalifa 38'	(Report) (in German)	(yellow card) 19' Regazzoni; (yellow card) 63' Mutsch; (yellow card) 77' Etoundi	Stadium: Letzigrund; Attendance: 14'400; Referee: Sébastien Pache

6 October 2012 12	FC Thun	2 – 3	Grasshopper Club Zurich	Thun
19:45	Steffen 30'; Schneuwly 64', (yellow card) 72'	(Report) (in German)	50' Zuber; 56' Ben Khalifa; 58' Toko	Stadium: Arena Thun; Attendance: 5'127; Referee: Pascal Erlachner

21 October 2012 13	Grasshopper Club Zurich	3 – 2	BSC Young Boys	Zürich
16:00	Hajrović 17', 30'; Zuber 45'; Toko (yellow card) 56'; Salatić (yellow card) 59'; Bürki (yellow card) 90+1'	(Report) (in German)	(yellow card) 25' Zárate; (yellow card) 46' Sutter; 50' Martínez; (yellow card) 83' Costanzo; 90' Bobadilla; (yellow card) 90+1' Vitkieviez	Stadium: Letzigrund; Attendance: 11'900; Referee: Damien Carrel

28 October 2012 14	Servette FC	2 – 0	Grasshopper Club Zurich	Lancy
13:45	S. Lang 9'; Kusunga (yellow card) 26'; Pont (yellow card) 44'; Eudis (yellow card) 68'; Pasche 87'	(Report) (in German)	(yellow card) 64' Zuber; (yellow card) 66' Pavlović; (yellow card) 78' Xhaka	Stadium: Stade de Genève; Attendance: 5'834; Referee: Nikolaj Hänni

3 November 2012 15	Grasshopper Club Zurich	1 – 1	FC Lausanne-Sport	Zürich
19:45	Grichting (yellow card) 31'; Hajrović 35'; Salatić (yellow card) 45'	(Report) (in German)	(yellow card) 7' Sanogo Jr. 13' Guié Guié; (yellow card) 90+3' Rodrigo	Stadium: Letzigrund; Attendance: 5'500; Referee: Cyril Zimmermann

18 November 2012 16	FC Basel	4 – 0	Grasshopper Club Zurich	Basel
16:00	D. Degen 7', (yellow card) 68'; Schär (yellow card) 33'; Streller 57' (pen.); A. Frei 72', 79'; Dragović (yellow card) 82'; P. Degen (yellow card) 85'	(Report) (in German)	(yellow card) 21' Pavlović; (yellow card) 32' Toko; (yellow card) 57' Grichting	Stadium: St. Jakob-Park; Attendance: 32'060; Referee: Daniel Wermelinger

24 November 2012 17	FC Sion	1 – 1	Grasshopper Club Zurich	Sion
19:45	Léo (yellow card) 16', (goal) 30'; Bühler (yellow card) 24'; Vanczák (yellow card) 77'	(Report) (in German)	3', (yellow card) 15' Gashi; (yellow card) 6' Feltscher; (yellow card) 59' Vilotić	Stadium: Stade de Tourbillon; Attendance: 13'200; Referee: Alain Bieri (Solothurn)

2 December 2012 18	Grasshopper Club Zurich	1 – 0	FC Zürich	Zürich
16:00	Xhaka (yellow card) 18'; Hajrović 22' (pen.); Ben Khalifa (yellow card) 24'; Pavlović (yellow card) 55'; Paiva (yellow card) 90+2'	(Report) (in German)	(yellow card) 21' Djimsiti	Stadium: Letzigrund; Attendance: 18'400; Referee: Patrick Graf

9 February 2013 19	Servette FC	0 – 1	Grasshopper Club Zurich	Lancy
19:45	Kusunga (yellow card) 24'; Pasche (yellow card) 66'; Pont (yellow card) 69'; Kouassi (yellow card) 84'; Eudis (yellow card) 89'	(Report) (in German)	(yellow card) 30' Hajrović; (yellow card) 44' Abrashi; (yellow card) 57' Lang; (yellow card) 77' Vilotić; 79' Brahimi	Stadium: Stade de Genève; Attendance: 4'830; Referee: Alain Bieri (Solothurn)

16 February 2013 20	Grasshopper Club Zurich	2 – 0	BSC Young Boys	Zürich
19:45	Abrashi (yellow card) 12'; Anatole 26', 79'; Grichting (yellow card) 56'	(Report) (in German)	(yellow card) 13' M. Bürki; (yellow card) 43' Affolter; (yellow card) 65' Zverotić	Stadium: Letzigrund; Attendance: 5'200; Referee: Stephan Klossner

24 February 2013 21	FC Basel	0 – 0	Grasshopper Club Zurich	Basel
16:00	Dragović (yellow card) 21'; Cabral (yellow card) 66'; Streller (yellow card) 82'; Schär (yellow card) 90+4'	(Report) (in German)	(yellow card) 17' Ben Khalifa; (yellow card) 27' Abrashi; (yellow card) 61' Hajrović; (yellow card) 90+4' Zuber	Stadium: St. Jakob-Park; Attendance: 27'653; Referee: Nikolaj Hänni

3 March 2013 22	FC Lausanne-Sport	0 – 0	Grasshopper Club Zurich	Lausanne
16:00	Roux (yellow card) 47'	(Report) (in German)	(yellow card) 61' Lang; (yellow card) 63' Hajrović; (yellow card) 81' Xhaka	Stadium: Stade Olympique de la Pontaise; Attendance: 4'300; Referee: Alain Bieri (Solothurn)

9 March 2013 23	Grasshopper Club Zurich	3 – 1	FC St. Gallen	Zürich
19:45	Anatole 2'; Salatić 56'; Gashi 90'	(Report) (in German)	(yellow card) 20' (yellow card) 88' (red card) Besle; 26' Nushi; (yellow card) 46' (yellow card) 70' (red card) Montandon; (yellow card) 79' Janjatovic	Stadium: Letzigrund; Attendance: 8'900; Referee: Sébastien Pache

17 March 2013 24	Grasshopper Club Zurich	0 – 0	FC Luzern	Zürich
16:00	Anatole (yellow card) 25'; Zuber (yellow card) 61'; Vilotić (yellow card) 61'; Grichting (yellow card) 88'	(Report) (in German)	(yellow card) 52' Muntwiler; (yellow card) 76' Stahel; (yellow card) 78' Wiss	Stadium: Letzigrund; Attendance: 8'100; Referee: Harald Lechner (Austria)

30 March 2013 25	FC Thun	1 - 0	Grasshopper Club Zurich	Thun
19:45	Schneuwly 34'; Bättig (yellow card) 55'	(Report) (in German)	(yellow card) 17' Xhaka	Stadium: Arena Thun; Attendance: 5'084; Referee: Sascha Kever

6 April 2013 26	FC Zürich	2 - 4	Grasshopper Club Zurich	Zürich
19:45	Chikhaoui (yellow card) 12'; Béda (yellow card) 21'; Da Costa (yellow card) 21'; Gajic 32' (pen.), 51'; Gavranović (yellow card) 60'; Glarner (yellow card) 68'	(Report) (in German)	12' (pen.) Hajrović; (yellow card) 21' Abrashi; (yellow card) 21' Toko; 25' Lang; (yellow card) 31' (goal) 70' Vilotić; 62' Salatić	Stadium: Letzigrund; Attendance: 16'111; Referee: Adrien Jaccottet (Basel)

14 April 2013 27	Grasshopper Club Zurich	1 - 1	FC Sion	Zürich
16:00	Xhaka (yellow card) 23'; Feltscher 37' (yellow card) 77'; Vilotić (yellow card) 67'	(Report) (in German)	(yellow card) 50' Gattuso; 66' Yoda; (yellow card) 72' Dingsdag; (yellow card) 87' Lacroix	Stadium: Letzigrund; Attendance: 6'700; Referee: Stephan Studer

21 April 2013 28	FC Luzern	1 - 1	Grasshopper Club Zurich	Lucerne
13:45	Stahel (yellow card) 10'; Andrist 11' (yellow card) 86'; Hochstrasser (yellow card) 43'; Sarr (yellow card) 59'	(Report) (in German)	33' Lang; (yellow card) 34' Abrashi; (yellow card) 86' Grichting; (yellow card) 90+3' Xhaka	Stadium: swissporarena Attendance: 12'360; Referee: Nikolaj Hänni

27 April 2013 29	Grasshopper Club Zurich	0 - 2	FC Thun	Zürich
19:45	Grichting (yellow card) 76'; Bauer (yellow card) 80'	(Report) (in German)	35' Steffen; (yellow card) 38' Schindelholz; (yellow card) 56' Bättig; 64' Schneuwly	Stadium: Letzigrund; Attendance: 4'100; Referee: Pascal Erlachner

4 May 2013 30	Grasshopper Club Zurich	2 - 0	Servette FC	Zürich
19:45	Zuber (yellow card) 9'; Hajrović (yellow card) 75'; Gashi 90+1'; Ben Khalifa (yellow card) 81' (goal) 90+4'	(Report) (in German)	(yellow card) 48' Tréand	Stadium: Letzigrund; Attendance: 4'050; Referee: Alain Bieri (Solothurn)

7 May 2013 31	BSC Young Boys	4 - 0	Grasshopper Club Zurich	Bern
19:45	Spycher (yellow card) 27'; Afum 33'; Costanzo (yellow card) 34'; C. Schneuwly (yellow card) 52'; Farnerud 62'; Nuzzolo 70'; Gerndt 90+3'	(Report) (in German)	(yellow card) 27' (yellow card) 57' (red card) Vilotić; (yellow card) 52' Salatić; (yellow card) 90+3' Anatole	Stadium: Stade de Suisse; Attendance: 15'069; Referee: Sébastien Pache

12 May 2013 32	Grasshopper Club Zurich	0 - 1	FC Zürich	Zürich
16:00	Xhaka (yellow card) 9'; Ben Khalifa (yellow card) 27'; Grichting (yellow card) 64'	(Report) (in German)	(yellow card) 54' Benito; 59' Chermiti; (yellow card) 66' R. Koch; (yellow card) 76' Gavranović; (red card) 90+5' Buff	Stadium: Letzigrund; Attendance: 14'700; Referee: Patrick Graf

16 May 2013 33	FC Sion	0 - 4	Grasshopper Club Zurich	Sion
19:45	Aislan (yellow card) 22'; Vanczák (yellow card) 54'; Margairaz (yellow card) 82'	(Report) (in German)	54' Gashi; 32' Zuber; 64' Anatole; (yellow card) 66' Ben Khalifa; 90+1' Brahimi	Stadium: Stade de Tourbillon; Attendance: 6'800; Referee: Stephan Klossner

26 May 2013 34	Grasshopper Club Zurich	1 - 0	FC Basel	Zürich
16:15	Anatole 90+4'	(Report) (in German)	(yellow card) 56' F. Frei	Stadium: Letzigrund; Attendance: 17'100; Referee: Sascha Kever

29 May 2013 35	FC St. Gallen	1 - 2	Grasshopper Club Zurich	St. Gallen
20:30	Janjatović 7'; Mutsch (yellow card) 22'; Besle (yellow card) 28' (yellow card) 38' (red card); Nater (yellow card) 52'; Lopar (yellow card) 51'	(Report) (in German)	(yellow card) 28' Anatole; 40' (pen.) (yellow card) 54' Hajrović; 52' Abrashi; (yellow card) 59' Vilotić; (yellow card) 75' Lang	Stadium: AFG Arena; Attendance: 18'360; Referee: Alain Bieri (Solothurn)

1 June 2013 36	Grasshopper Club Zurich	4 - 1	FC Lausanne-Sport	Zürich
20:30	Zuber 21' (pen.); Hajrović (yellow card) 28'; Gashi 60' (pen.); Anatole 73'; Ben Khalifa 90'	(Report) (in German)	(yellow card) 28' Kamber; (yellow card) 60' Chakhsi; 85' Avanzini; (yellow card) 89' Facchinetti	Stadium: Letzigrund; Attendance: 4'400; Referee: Adrien Jaccottet (Basel)

==== League table ====
===== Results summary =====
Overall								Home						Away					
Pld	W	D	L	GF	GA	GD	Pts	W	D	L	GF	GA	GD	W	D	L	GF	GA	GD
36	20	9	7	48	32	+16	69	11	4	3	25	13	+12	9	5	4	23	19	+4

Last updated: 2 June 2013.
Source: Fussballdaten.de

=== Swiss Cup ===
Kickoff times are in CET

16 September 2012 1st Round	Vedeggio Calcio (Ticino)	0 – 5	(Canton of Zurich) Grasshopper Club Zurich	Cadempino
15:00		(Report) (in German)	12' Toko; 17', 65', 89' Paiva; 63' Feltscher	Stadium: Centro sportivo Attendance: 1'048; Referee: Roland Huwiler

10 November 2012 2nd Round	AC Vallemaggia (Ticino)	0 – 6	(Canton of Zurich) Grasshopper Club Zurich	Locarno
16:00		(Report) (in German)	15' Grichting; 48', 56', 77' Feltscher; 73' Paiva; 80' Gashi	Stadium: Stadio del Lido; Attendance: 1'185; Referee: Ludovic Gremaud

8 December 2012 3rd Round	FC Schaffhausen (Canton of Schaffhausen)	1 – 1 (a.e.t.) (2 – 3 p)	(Canton of Zurich) Grasshopper Club Zurich	Schaffhausen
17:30	Mangold 45'	(Report) (in German)	31' Feltscher	Stadium: Stadion Breite; Attendance: 2'200; Referee: Sascha Kever
	Penalties
	Frontino (penalty scored); Rossini (penalty scored); Schiendorfer (penalty missed); Dos Santos (penalty missed); Baykal (penalty missed)		(penalty scored) Salatić; (penalty scored) Gashi; (penalty missed) Zuber; (penalty missed) Vilotić; (penalty scored) Paiva

27 February 2013 Quarterfinal	FC Aarau (Aargau)	1 – 4	(Canton of Zurich) Grasshopper Club Zurich	Aarau
20:15	Ioniţă 65'	(Report) (in German)	16', 74' Feltscher; 89' Zuber; 90' Anatole	Stadium: Stadion Brügglifeld; Attendance: 6'600; Referee: Stephan Studer

17 April 2013 Semifinal	FC Zürich (Canton of Zurich)	1 – 2 (a.e.t.)	(Canton of Zurich) Grasshopper Club Zurich	Zürich
19:00	Feltscher 23' (o.g.)	(Report) (in German)	39' Feltscher; 94' Hajrović	Stadium: Letzigrund; Attendance: 20'507; Referee: Alain Bieri

20 May 2013
16:00
Final

FC Basel (Basel-Stadt)	1 – 1 (a.e.t.)	(Canton of Zurich) Grasshopper Club Zurich
Schär (yellow card) 28'; Dragović (yellow card) 57'; Steinhöfer 71'; Elneny (yellow card) 91'	(Report) (in German); SFV summary	(yellow card) 29' Gashi; 75' Hajrović
Penalties
Schär (penalty scored); F. Frei (penalty missed); Steinhöfer (penalty scored); Díaz (penalty scored); Bobadilla (penalty missed)	3 – 4	(penalty scored) Salatić; (penalty scored) Hajrović; (penalty missed) Lang; (penalty scored) Feltscher; (penalty scored) Vilotić

Stade de Suisse, Bern
Attendance: 27'290
Referee: Stephan Studer

GK	(Switzerland) Yann Sommer
DF	(Switzerland) Kay Voser		(substituted off) 60'
DF	(Switzerland) Fabian Schär	(yellow card) 28'
DF	(Austria) Aleksandar Dragović	(yellow card) 57'
DF	(South Korea) Park Joo-Ho
MF	(Switzerland) Fabian Frei
MF	(Chile) Marcelo Díaz
MF	(Egypt) Mohamed Elneny	(yellow card) 91'
MF	(Ivory Coast) Serey Die		(substituted off) 106'
MF	(Switzerland) Valentin Stocker
ST	(Switzerland) Marco Streller (c)		(substituted off) 69'
Substitutes:
DF	(Germany) Markus Steinhöfer		(substituted on) 60'
MF	(Argentina) Raúl Bobadilla		(substituted on) 69'
FW	(Switzerland) David Degen		(substituted on) 106'
Manager:
(Switzerland) Murat Yakin

GK	(Switzerland) Roman Bürki		(substituted off) 46'
DF	(Switzerland) Michael Lang
DF	(Serbia) Milan Vilotić
DF	(Switzerland) Stéphane Grichting
DF	(Austria) Moritz Bauer
MF	(Albania) Amir Abrashi		(substituted off) 95'
MF	(Switzerland) Vero Salatić
MF	(Bosnia and Herzegovina) Izet Hajrović
MF	(Albania) Shkëlzen Gashi	(yellow card) 29'	(substituted off) 100'
MF	(Switzerland) Steven Zuber		(substituted off) 66'
ST	(France) Anatole Ngamukol
Substitutes:
MF	(Venezuela) Frank Feltscher		(substituted on) 66'
MF	(Democratic Republic of the Congo) Nzuzi Toko		(substituted on) 95'
MF	(Switzerland) Nassim Ben Khalifa		(substituted on) 100'
Manager:
(Switzerland) Uli Forte

== Squad ==
=== Squad, matches played and goals scored ===
No.	Name	Nationality	Position	Date of birth (age)	at GCZ since	Signed from	SL matches	SL goals	Cup matches	Cup goals
Goalkeepers
1	Roman Bürki	(Switzerland)	GK	14 November 1990 (age 35)	2011	Young Boys	34	0	4	0
18	Davide Taini	(Switzerland)	GK	7 December 1976 (age 49)	2011	Wil	2	0	2	0
33	Andreas Hirzel	(Switzerland)	GK	25 March 1993 (age 33)	2012	Aarau	0	0	0	0
Defenders
2	Willian Rocha	(Brazil)	CB	1 April 1989 (age 37)	2013	Sport Recife	2(3)	0	0	0
3	Stéphane Grichting	(Switzerland)	CB	30 March 1979 (age 47)	2012	Auxerre	33	0	6	1
4	Milan Vilotić	(Serbia)	CB	21 October 1986 (age 39)	2012	Red Star Belgrade	31	2	5	0
5	Michael Lang	(Switzerland)	CB	8 February 1991 (age 35)	2011	St. Gallen	33	3	5	0
13	Taulant Xhaka	(Switzerland)	CB	28 March 1991 (age 35)	2012	Basel	19(6)	0	2(2)	0
19	Daniel Pavlović	(Switzerland)	CB	22 April 1988 (age 38)	2011	Kaiserslautern	22(1)	0	4	0
22	Gianluca Hossmann	(Switzerland)	CB	25 March 1991 (age 35)	2006		1	0	0	0
29	Levent Gülen	(Switzerland)	CB	24 February 1994 (age 32)	2012		0	0	0(1)	0
34	Moritz Bauer	(Switzerland)	CB	25 February 1992 (age 34)	2010		11(2)	0	3(1)	0
Midfielders
6	Vero Salatić	(Switzerland)	MF	14 November 1985 (age 40)	2012	AC Omonia	31	3	5	0
7	Steven Zuber	(Switzerland)	MF	17 August 1991 (age 35)	2006	Winterthur	30(2)	5	4	1
8	Amir Abrashi	(Switzerland)	MF	27 March 1990 (age 36)	2012	Winterthur	22(5)	3	5(1)	0
10	Shkëlzen Gashi	(Switzerland)	MF	15 July 1988 (age 38)	2012	Aarau	17(11)	4	4(1)	1
11	Frank Feltscher	(Switzerland)	MF	17 May 1988 (age 38)	2011	Bellinzona	14(20)	1	5(1)	8
14	Izet Hajrović	(Switzerland)	MF	4 August 1991 (age 35)	2000		32(2)	8	2(2)	2
27	Mergim Brahimi	(Switzerland)	MF	8 August 1992 (age 34)	2001		0(16)	3	1(3)	0
28	Toko Nzuzi	(Switzerland)	MF	20 December 1990 (age 35)	2003		22(4)	2	2(1)	1
32	Mohamed Coulibaly	(France)	MF	7 August 1988 (age 38)	2011	Dornach	0(5)	0	0	0
Forwards
9	João Paiva	(Portugal)	ST	8 February 1983 (age 43)	2011	Luzern	2(10)	0	2(1)	4
15	Nassim Ben Khalifa	(Switzerland)	ST	13 January 1992 (age 34)	2012	Young Boys	26(7)	5	2(1)	0
17	Anatole Ngamukol	(Equatorial Guinea)	ST	15 January 1988 (age 38)	2013	Thun	13(3)	5	3	1
25	Endogan Adili	(Switzerland)	ST	3 August 1994 (age 32)	2003		0(1)	0	1	0
35	Orhan Mustafi	(Switzerland)	ST	4 April 1990 (age 36)	2011	Basel	0(4)	0	0(1)	0

Last updated: 2 June 2013

Note: Numbers in parentheses denote substitution appearances.

Players in italic left the club during the season

=== Transfers ===
Summer Transfers in
Name	Nationality	Position	Type	Moving from
Milan Vilotić	(Serbia)	CB	Transfer	Red Star Belgrade
Shkëlzen Gashi	(Switzerland)	MF	Transfer	Aarau
Stéphane Grichting	(Switzerland)	CB	Transfer	Auxerre
Vero Salatić	(Switzerland)	CB	Transfer	AC Omonia
Andreas Hirzel	(Switzerland)	GK	on loan	Aarau
Nassim Ben Khalifa	(Switzerland)	ST	on loan	BSC Young Boys
Raphael Spiegel	(Switzerland)	GK	loan return	SC Brühl
Steven Lang	(Switzerland)	MF	loan return	Lausanne
Charyl Chappuis	(Switzerland)	MF	loan return	Locarno
Josip Colina	(Bosnia and Herzegovina)	CB	loan return	Lugano

Summer Transfers out
Name	Nationality	Position	Type	Moving to
Raphael Spiegel	(Switzerland)	GK	Transfer	West Ham United
Davide Callà	(Switzerland)	MF	Transfer	Aarau
Alessandro Merlo	(Switzerland)	GK	Transfer	FC Wettswil-Bonstetten
Sehar Fejzulahi	(Switzerland)	MF	Transfer	Aarau
Davor Landeka	(Bosnia and Herzegovina)	MF	Transfer	Široki Brijeg
Daniël de Ridder	(Netherlands)	MF	Transfer	Heerenveen
Paulo Menezes	(Brazil)	CB	Transfer	Lugano
Iacopo La Rocca	(Italy)	CB	Transfer	Western Sydney Wanderers
Marco Kehl	(Switzerland)	CB	Transfer	Lugano
Bruno Bertucci	(Brazil)	CB	Transfer	Neftchi Baku
Josip Colina	(Bosnia and Herzegovina)	CB	Transfer	unknown
Charyl Chappuis	(Switzerland)	MF	on loan	Lugano
Steven Lang	(Switzerland)	MF	on loan	Servette FC
Denis Simijonovic	(Switzerland)	MF	loan return	Winterthur
Boris Smiljanić	(Switzerland)	CB	retired	
Ricardo Cabanas	(Switzerland)	MF	retired	

Winter Transfers in
Name	Nationality	Position	Type	Moving from
Anatole Ngamukol	(Equatorial Guinea)	ST	Transfer	Thun
Willian Rocha	(Brazil)	CB	on loan	Sport Recife
Charyl Chappuis	(Switzerland)	MF	loan return	Lugano

Winter Transfers out
Name	Nationality	Position	Type	Moving to
Endogan Adili	(Switzerland)	MF	Transfer	Basel
Charyl Chappuis	(Switzerland)	MF	Transfer	Buriram
Orhan Mustafi	(Switzerland)	ST	on loan	Wil

== Coaching staff ==
Position	Staff
Manager	(Switzerland) (Italy) Uli Forte
Assistant coach	(Romania) Zoltan Kadar
Fitness coach	(Switzerland) Alex Kern
Goalkeeper coach	(Switzerland) Christoph Born

Last updated: 20 December 2012
Source: GCZ Official Site
