= Feltscher =

Feltscher is a surname. Notable people with the surname include:

- Binia Feltscher (born 1978), Swiss curler
- Frank Feltscher (born 1988), Swiss-Venezuelan footballer
- Rolf Feltscher (born 1990), Swiss-Venezuelan footballer, brother of Frank
