= Michael Lang (footballer, born 1991) =

Swiss footballer

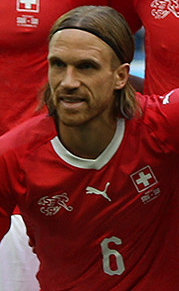
- Lang with Switzerland at the 2018 FIFA World Cup

Personal information
- Full name: Michael Rico Lang
- Date of birth: 8 February 1991 (age 35)
- Place of birth: Egnach, Switzerland
- Height: 1.85 m (6 ft 1 in)
- Position: Defender

Youth career
- 2000–2006: FC St. Gallen

Senior career*
Years	Team	Apps	(Gls)
2006–2011	St. Gallen	66	(4)
2011–2015	Grasshopper Club Zürich	127	(12)
2015–2018	Basel	87	(16)
2018–2021	Borussia Mönchengladbach	17	(1)
2019–2020	→ Werder Bremen (loan)	9	(0)
2021–2024	Basel	64	(5)
Total		370	(38)

International career
2005–2007	Switzerland U16	11	(1)
2007–2008	Switzerland U17	19	(2)
2008–2009	Switzerland U18	7	(0)
2009–2010	Switzerland U19	16	(3)
2010–2012	Switzerland U20	11	(3)
2013–2019	Switzerland	31	(3)

Managerial career
- 2024–: Wil (sporting director)
- * Club domestic league appearances and goals as of 27 May 2024

Michael Rico Lang (born 8 February 1991) is a Swiss former professional footballer, best known for his time as defender of Swiss Super League club FC Basel, for whom he's played 263 games. He also played for FC St. Gallen and Grasshopper Club Zürich in Switzerland, as well as Borussia Mönchengladbach and Werder Bremen in Germany.

Internationally, Lang played for Switzerland at every youth level between under-16 and under-20. He represented his country's senior side between 2013 and 2019, achieving 31 caps for his country.

He is currently the sporting director of Swiss Challenge League side FC Wil.

== Club career ==
=== St. Gallen ===
In the year 2000 Lang joined the youth department of FC St. Gallen and in 2006 he advanced to play in their U-21 team, who played in the 1. Liga, at that time the third tier in the Swiss football league system. On the last matchday of the 2006–07 Swiss Super League season, on 24 May 2007, he played his domestic league debut for the first team in the away game as FCSG played a 1–1 draw against Aarau. He played his first league match at age 16, making him one of the youngest debut players in the Swiss Super League to that date. Lang remained with the U-21 team, but came to three appearances in their first team in the 2007–08 Swiss Super League, however FCSG suffered relegation. The following season FCSG won the 2008–09 Swiss Challenge League and as division champions won immediate promotion. Lang had nine appearances and scored one goal that season.

Lang remained with the club for two further seasons. During his time with them he played 66 first team matches and scored four goals for them.

=== Grasshopper Club ===
In the summer 2011 he signed a four-year contract with Grasshopper Club Zürich, the Swiss record football champion. The Swiss Cup one of the semi-finals was the derby between Zürich and Grasshopper Club. FCZ went ahead in the first half, but GC were able to draw level before half time. No further goals fell and so the game went into extra time. Izet Hajrović scored the winning goal in the 94th minute and GC advanced to the final. This was played in the Stade de Suisse, Wankdorf, Bern on 20 May 2013 and FCB played against GC. In the 71st minute Markus Steinhöfer put Basel a goal up, but Izet Hajrović was able to equalise just four minutes later. No further goals fell, not during extra time either. It came to a penalty shootout and despite the fact that Lang himself didn't net his spot kick, GC won the shootout 4–3 and lifted the trophy.

The Grasshopper Club played two unsuccessful consecutive seasons in the UEFA Champions League qualifications: in 2013–14 first leg 1–0 away from home and second leg also 1–0 at home against Lyon and 2014–15, first leg 2–0 at home and second leg with a 1–1 draw away against Lille OSC.

In his four seasons with GC, Lang played 127 domestic league matches and he scored 12 goals.

=== Basel ===
On 1 June 2015, Lang joined Basel on a free transfer. He joined Basel's first team for their 2015–16 season under new head coach Urs Fischer. After playing in three test games, Lang made his first team league debut on 19 July 2015 in the 2–0 home win against Vaduz. He scored his first goal for his new team just one week later on 25 July during the away game against his old club Grasshopper Club. It was the last goal of the game and Basel won 3–2. Under trainer Urs Fischer Lang won the Swiss Super League championship at the end of the 2015–16 Super League season During that season Lang had 22 league appearances, one in the Swiss Cup, four in that season's Champions League qualifying phase and ten appearances in the Europa League. He scored seven goals in these games.

In the 2016–17 Super League season Lang would celebrate success with the team. This was the club's eighth consecutive title and their 20th overall championship title. They also won the Swiss Cup beating Sion 3–0 in the final on 25 May, which meant they had won the double. Lang had played 31 games in the league, five in the domestic Cup and five in the 2016–17 UEFA Champions League. He scored six league goals and three in the cup.

In the 2017–18 FC Basel season Raphaël Wicky was hired as new head coach but ended that season as runners-up. Lang scored his first Champions League goal in the 2017–18 UEFA Champions League group stage home game on 27 September against Benfica. It was the first goal of the game that Basel went on to win 5–0. Following this, on 22 November, in the home game against Manchester United he scored the winning goal in the 89th minute as Basel won 1–0 to end the group in second position and advance to the next round. In the knockout phase, when playing Manchester City, Lang again scored the winning goal in the 71st minute as Basel won 2–1 and ended their opponent's 15-month unbeaten home run. Lang had 34 league appearances, two in the cup and eight in the Champions League. He scored a total of ten goals in these three competitions.

In the 122 games that he had played for RotBlau, across all competitions, Lang had scored 26 goals and had prepared another 18.

=== Borussia Mönchengladbach ===
In June 2018, Lang joined Borussia Mönchengladbach for their 2018–19 season having agreed a four-year contract. The transfer fee paid to Basel was reported as €2.8 million. During the season Lang had 17 league appearances, scoring one goal in the 4–1 win over Hannover 96 on 25 November. He also had one appearance in the 2018–19 DFB-Pokal, a 5–0 home defeat against Bayer Leverkusen on 31 October.

Werder Bremen (loan)

On 29 August 2019, Lang joined SV Werder Bremen on a season-long loan deal for the 2019–20 Bundesliga season with an option to buy included. Initially Lang arrived as replacement for the injured Theodor Gebre Selassie and played four consecutive games for over 90 minutes from the third to the sixth matchday, but after that he was hardly used anymore. That season Lang played nine times for Werder in the Bundesliga and once in the DFB Cup. After the loan ended, the option that he could he permanently signed was not exercised.

After his loan period Lang went back returned to Gladbach for another season, however, it was a season to forget. He played only in two DFB Cup matches, both times coming on a substitute and once in the 2020–21 UEFA Champions League also as substitute in the away match against Shakhtar Donetsk.

=== Return to Basel ===
On 19 July 2021 FC Basel announced, that Lang had moved back to them, with immediate effect. The 30-year-old right-back signed a contract until the summer of 2023, with an option for a further year. He joined Basel's first team for their 2021–22 season under head coach Patrick Rahmen. The team started well into the league season with seven victories and five draws before their first defeat. They ended the campaign as runners-up, they had achieved 15 victories and were defeated only four times. However, they had given away too many points, because they could only achieve a draw on 17 occasions. In the 2021–22 UEFA Europa Conference League they won their group, but were knocked out in the round of 16 losing twice against Marseille. Lang totaled 39 appearances, 26 League, one Cup and 12 Conference League. He scored six goals in these matches.

For their Basel's 2022–23 season Alexander Frei was hired as new head coach. However, the season didn't start well for the team, two defeats and three draws in the first six matches and things continued in that manor. In February Frei was replaced through Heiko Vogel, but at the end of the season Basel were in fifth position. Lang had 27 appearances, mainly in the starting eleven, scoring one goal. In the 2022–23 Swiss Cup the team advancedas far as the semi-finals. Lang had four appearances, also scoring once. In the 2022–23 UEFA Europa Conference League the team were runners-up in their group, but advanced via the play-offs to the knockout phase, and then advanced as far as the semi-finals. Here they were matched against Fiorentina, winning the first leg 2–1 away, they lost the second leg at home in the St. Jakob-Park by the same score, thus they went into extra time. In the tenth minute of the added over-time in the second half of the extra time Basel conceded the decisive goal and were knocked out in the most bitter of ways. Lang had 15 appearances, scoring one goal here as well.

On 25 July 2024 Basel announced that by mutual agreement Lang and the club had terminated their contract. It therefore turned out, that the last match of their 2023–24 season against Yverdon-Sport, which ended in a goalless draw on 21 May 2024, had been his last competitive game with the team. Between the years 2015 to 2018 and again from 2021 to 2024, Lang played a total of 263 games for Basel scoring a total of 36 goals. 151 of these games were in the Swiss Super League, 14 in the Swiss Cup, 56 in the UEFA competitions (Champions League, Europa League and Conference League) and 42 were friendly games. He scored 21 goals in the domestic league, six in the cup, eight in the European games and the other was scored during the test games.

=== Retirement ===
On 12 November 2024, he was announced as the new sporting director of Swiss Challenge League side FC Wil, thus ending his active playing career. The current sporting director, Jan Breitenmoser, will work with Lang to ensure a seamless transition, before finally departing in the summer of 2025.

== International career ==
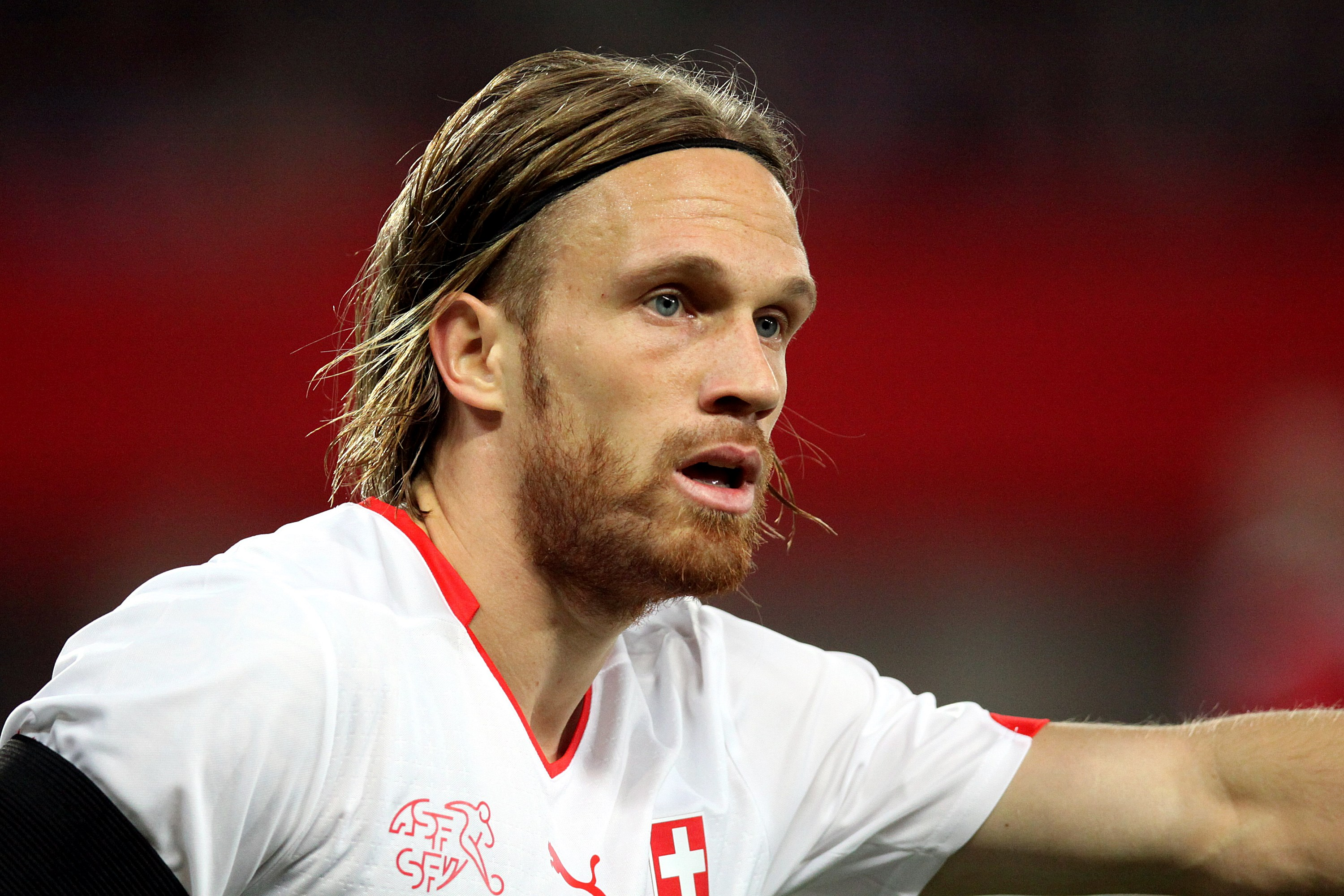
Lang with Switzerland in 2015

Lang made his first senior international appearance for Switzerland on 14 August 2013 in the friendly against Brazil. He came on as a second-half substitute for Stephan Lichtsteiner as the team won 1–0 at St. Jakob-Park. He scored his first goal in his second appearance later on 11 October in the 2–1 win against Albania in match 9 of 2014 FIFA World Cup qualification Group E; this win clinched Switzerland's place at the 2014 FIFA World Cup.

Lang was called by manager Ottmar Hitzfeld in the squad of 23 players for the final tournament. He played his first and only match of the campaign in the final Group E game against Honduras, entering in the final 13 minutes. Switzerland was eventually knocked out of the tournament by Argentina in the round of 16.

He was part of the squad for the 2016 European Championships where the team achieved the best result reaching round of 16.

He was included in Switzerland's 23-man squad for the 2018 FIFA World Cup. He was sent off in Switzerland's 1–0 defeat to Sweden in the round of 16 for denying an obvious goalscoring opportunity in the 90+4th minute, becoming the only player in to tournament to be sent off in the knockout stage

In May 2019, he played in 2019 UEFA Nations League Finals, where his team finished 4th.

== Career statistics ==
=== Club ===
As of 12 November 2024

Appearances and goals by club, season and competition
Club	Season	League			National cup (Note: Includes Swiss Cup, DFB-Pokal)		Europe		Total	
Club	Season	Division	Apps	Goals	Apps	Goals	Apps	Goals	Apps	Goals
St. Gallen	2009–10	Swiss Super League	22	1	2	1	—		24	2
St. Gallen	2010–11	Swiss Super League	31	2	1	0	—		32	2
St. Gallen	Total		53	3	3	1	—		56	4
Grasshopper	2011–12	Swiss Super League	26	1	2	0	—		28	1
Grasshopper	2012–13	Swiss Super League	33	3	5	0	—		38	3
Grasshopper	2013–14	Swiss Super League	34	3	3	1	4 (Note: Two appearances in UEFA Champions League, two appearances in UEFA Europa League)	0	41	4
Grasshopper	2014–15	Swiss Super League	35	5	3	0	4	1	42	6
Grasshopper	Total		128	12	13	1	8	1	149	14
Basel	2015–16	Swiss Super League	22	5	1	0	14 (Note: Four appearances and one goal in UEFA Champions League, ten appearances and one goal in UEFA Europa League)	2	37	7
Basel	2016–17	Swiss Super League	31	6	4	3	5 (Note: Appearance(s) in UEFA Champions League)	0	40	9
Basel	2017–18	Swiss Super League	34	5	2	2	8	3	44	10
Basel	Total		87	16	7	5	27	5	121	26
Borussia Mönchengladbach	2018–19	Bundesliga	17	1	1	0	—		18	1
Borussia Mönchengladbach	2020–21	Bundesliga	0	0	2	0	1	0	3	0
Borussia Mönchengladbach	Total		17	1	3	0	1	0	21	1
Werder Bremen (loan)	2019–20	Bundesliga	9	0	1	0	—		10	0
Basel	2021–22	Swiss Super League	26	4	1	0	12 (Note: Appearances in UEFA Europa Conference League)	2	39	6
Basel	2022–23	Swiss Super League	27	1	4	1	15	1	46	3
Basel	2023–24	Swiss Super League	11	0	1	0	2	0	14	0
Basel	Total		64	5	6	1	29	3	99	9
Career total			358	37	33	7	58	9	451	54

=== International ===
As of 18 November 2019

Appearances and goals by national team and year
National team	Year	Apps	Goals
Switzerland	2013	4	1
Switzerland	2014	4	0
Switzerland	2015	5	1
Switzerland	2016	7	0
Switzerland	2017	1	0
Switzerland	2018	9	1
Switzerland	2019	1	0
Total		31	3

As of 15 October 2018. Switzerland score listed first, score column indicates score after each Lang goal.

International goals by date, venue, cap, opponent, score, result and competition
No.	Date	Venue	Cap	Opponent	Score	Result	Competition
1	11 October 2013	Qemal Stafa Stadium, Tirana, Albania	2	Albania	2–0	2–1	2014 FIFA World Cup qualification
2	9 October 2015	AFG Arena, St. Gallen, Switzerland	10	San Marino	1–0	7–0	UEFA Euro 2016 qualifying
3	15 October 2018	Laugardalsvöllur, Reykjavík, Iceland	29	Iceland	2–0	2–1	2018–19 UEFA Nations League A

== Honours ==
St. Gallen

- Swiss Challenge League: 2008–09

Grasshopper

- Swiss Cup: 2012–13

Basel

- Swiss Super League: 2015–16, 2016–17
- Swiss Cup: 2016–17

=== Individual ===
- Swiss Super League Player of the Year: 2017–18
- Swiss Super League Team of the Year: 2013–14, 2014–15, 2015–16, 2016–17, 2017–18, 2022–23
