= Amir Abrashi =

Albanian footballer (born 1990)

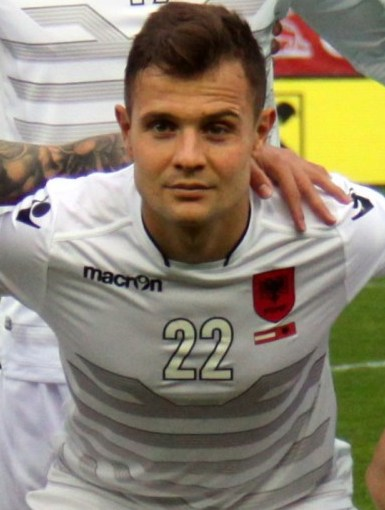
- Abrashi with Albania in 2016

Personal information
- Date of birth: 27 March 1990 (age 36)
- Place of birth: Bischofszell, Switzerland
- Height: 1.73 m (5 ft 8 in)
- Position: Defensive midfielder

Team information
- Current team: Grasshopper
- Number: 6

Youth career
- 2002–2005: Bischofszell
- 2003–2005: → Weinfelden-Bürglen (loan)
- 2005–2007: Winterthur

Senior career*
Years	Team	Apps	(Gls)
2007–2008	Winterthur II	16	(2)
2008–2011	Winterthur	58	(4)
2010–2015	Grasshopper	127	(6)
2015–2021	SC Freiburg	93	(4)
2019	SC Freiburg II	1	(0)
2021	→ Basel (loan)	10	(0)
2021–	Grasshopper	141	(2)

International career^{‡}
2007–2008	Switzerland U17	2	(0)
2008–2009	Switzerland U19	20	(2)
2010–2012	Switzerland U21	18	(0)
2012	Switzerland Olympic	4	(0)
2013–2024	Albania	51	(1)
- * Club domestic league appearances and goals as of 21 November 2026 ‡ National team caps and goals as of 16 November 2024

Amir Abrashi (born 27 March 1990) is a professional footballer who plays as a defensive midfielder for Swiss Super League club Grasshopper.

== Club career ==
=== Early career ===
Abrashi was born in Bischofszell, Switzerland, to Albanian parents from Gjakova, Kosovo who had emigrated in Switzerland before his birth. He grew up in the Canton of Thurgau region and began his career in 2002 aged 12 with his hometown club, FC Bischofszell. A year later, he moved to FC Weinfelden-Bürglen, where he spent two years before returning to his hometown club FC Bischofszell. However, just a month after his return, aged 16 Abrashi moved to Winterthur along with his family, where he joined local side FC Winterthur, the club where he would remain for the remainder of his youth career.

=== Winterthur ===
==== Reserve team ====
Following impressive performances with the youth teams, Abrashi was first called up to the reserve side towards the end of the 2006–07 season, making his debut on 16 May 2007 in a goalless draw against GC Biaschesi, coming on in the 81st minute for Micha Iseli. Ten days later he was in the starting formation for the 3–2 away win against FC Chur 97.

The following season, he started in the youth team but was promoted permanently a few months into the season, and on 11 November 2007 he came on as a late substitute in a 4–3 loss against St. Gallen II. He started the following game which was the 4–1 win against FC Herisau in which Abrashi scored his first competitive goal in the final moments. He became a regular in the squad's starting line-up for the second half of the season, scoring he second of the campaign against FC Baden. Abrashi played 16 matches and scored 2 goals in the 2007–08 season.

==== Senior team ====
Abrashi's impressive performance in the reserve team caught the attention of the first team coach Mathias Walther, who included the 18-year-old in his squad for the Challenge League class against FC La Chaux-de-Fonds on 27 April 2008. Abrashi came on as a 67th-minute substitute for fellow Albanian Sehar Fejzulahi in the 1–0 away loss. He made 2 more appearances off the bench for the senior side against Lugano and SR Delémont, respectively.

Abrashi had his breakthrough season during the 2008–09 campaign where he played 24 matches and scored once. That goal came on 8 August 2008 in the 0–2 away win at La Chaux-de-Fonds. He also retained his spot in the 2009–10 season, making 28 league appearances and scoring 3 goals as Winterthur finished 3rd in the championship, missing out the promotion play-off for only 3 points.

Abrashi made 55 league appearances and 3 cup appearances, scoring 5 goals before leaving for top flight side Grasshopper.

=== Grasshopper ===
In July 2010, Abrashi was sent on a one-year loan at Grasshopper. He was handed squad number 8, and made his competitive debut on 25 July as a substitute in the team's 2–0 away loss to Zürich. This was also his first ever Swiss Super League appearance in his career. Abrashi was also included in Ciriaco Sforza's team for the 2010–11 UEFA Europa League campaign, making his debut on 19 August in the first leg of play-off round against Steaua București finished in a 1–0 away loss. He also played in the returning leg as the regular and extra time finished 1–0 for Grasshopper, which lead the match to penalty shootouts where the team was defeated 4–3 despite Abrashi successfully scoring his attempt.

Abrashi scored his maiden Grasshopper goal on 17 October in the 0–12 hammering of Gumefens/Sorens in the Round 2 of Swiss Cup. His first score-sheet contributions in league came on matchday 14 where he scored the opener in an eventual 2–0 home win against St. Gallen. He finished his first season with Grasshopper by making 33 appearances in all competitions, including 27 in league, scoring 4 goals, equaling his personal best set in the last season, as the team finished 7th in the championship, was eliminated in the quarter-final of Swiss Cup by Sion despite Abrashi's goal and was eliminated in the play-off round of Europa League.

Following the end of the loan, Abrashi's transfer was made permanent for a fee of €600,000. His second season in Grasshopper was marred by injuries as on 27 August 2011 in the league match against Luzern he suffered a Cruciate Ligament Rupture injury which kept him sidelined until February of the following year. Abrashi's on field return occurred on 17 March as he played in the last minutes of a 2–0 home win over Young Boys for the Swiss Super League matchday 25. He was able to make only 16 appearances during this season, 15 of them in league, collecting 1091 minutes.

Abrashi won his first silverware with Grasshopper in the 2012–13 season, as he contributed with 6 matches, including the final, as the team defeated Basel 4–3 on penalties after regular and extra time had ended 1–1 to win their 19th Swiss Cup in history. It was also the club's first trophy in 10 years. He scored his first league goal in almost two years on 19 August in the 0–2 away win over Luzern. He finished his third season with the club by playing 33 matches between league and cup, scoring 3 times as the team finished runner-up in the championship, missing the title to Basel for only 3 points.

Grasshoper's second place in the championship league meant that they have qualified in the 2013–14 UEFA Champions League third qualifying round. Abrashi made his UEFA Champions League debut on 30 July 2014 in the first leg against Lyon which finished in a 1–0 away loss. The team were also defeated in the second leg and were reduced in the UEFA Europa League play-off round where they faced Fiorentina. Abrashi scored his first and only goal of the season on 14 September in the 2013–14 Swiss Cup Round 2 against Stade Nyonnais; he netted the goal in the 121st minute to give Grasshoper a 4–1 win and progression to the next round. Abrashi made his 100th Swiss Super League appearance on 15 May 2014 in the 4–1 home win against Luzern in the matchday 35. He finished his fourth Grasshoper season by making 40 appearances in all competitions, setting a new personal best as the team finished runner-up once again in the championship.

In the 2014–15 season, Abrashi scored his first European goal. The goal came on 5 August 2014 in the returning leg of 2014–15 UEFA Champions League third qualifying round against Lille; the match finished in a 1–1 away draw which was not enough for Grasshoper who was eliminated 3–1 on aggregate. In December 2014, Abrashi announced that he would not extend his contract with the club. In February 2015, he confirmed that 2014–15 season would be his last with Grasshoper, adding that he will pursue a career outside of Switzerland. He finished his 5th and final season with Grasshopper by making 33 appearances in all competitions, including 26 in league, scoring 3 times. Overall, Abrashi played 127 matches in league, 18 in cup and 10 in UEFA competitions, scoring 11 goals in the process.

=== SC Freiburg ===
On 3 June 2015, it was announced the Abrashi had successfully completed a move to German side SC Freiburg. He was presented on the same day, where he signed the three-year deal and was given the squad number 6.

Abrashi made his official debut with the club on 27 July 2015 in the opening match of 2. Bundesliga against Nürnberg, playing full-90 minutes in a 6–3 home win. He scored his first goal for the team on 11 September in Freiburg's 2–0 defeat of Kaiserslautern. He quickly established himself in the starting lineup, becoming an important instrument in the team's midfield, playing 33 league match throughout the season, as the team achieved the promotion to Bundesliga by winning the league.

Abrashi made his Bundesliga debut on 28 August 2016 in the opening league match of 2016–17 season, playing full-90 minutes in team's 2–1 away defeat to Hertha BSC in the last moments. After remaining on the bench for half of September, he returned and scored his first top flight goal on 29 October in Freiburg's 3–1 defeat of Werder Bremen. On 19 December, he agreed a contract extension, signing until 2020, with the new deal including a significant wage rise.

In November 2017, Abrashi suffered an injury which kept him sidelined for the next two months. He returned in action in the first days of 2018 by scoring a header in a friendly versus Bundesliga side Hamburger SV which ended in a 1–1 draw. He was injured again on 10 March 2018 in the league encounter against Hertha BSC, cracking the knee in the 29th minute, which ruled him out for the remaining of the season. He remained sidelined for almost a year, returning to training only in January 2019, and played his first match a month later, starting in a goalless draw against Schalke 04.

==== Loan to FC Basel ====
On 27 January 2021, Abrashi moved on loan to Swiss club FC Basel. Basel confirmed the loan deal with Abrashi on the same day and that the contract would last until the end of the season. Abrashi joined Basel's first team during the winter break of their 2020–21 season under head coach Ciriaco Sforza. He played his domestic league debut for the club in the home game in the St. Jakob-Park four days later, on 31 January, as Basel played a 2–2 draw with Lugano. At the end of the loan period Abrashi had played a total of 10 games for Basel without scoring a goal. All of these games were in the Super League.

=== Return to Grasshoppers ===
On 23 June 2021, Abrashi returned to Grasshoppers on a two-year contract. He immediately took up captaining duties in the team's first season back in the Swiss Super League. While his return was widely celebrated among the fans, it didn't go as smoothly as hoped, as he received four yellow cards in his first four games. In his first derby back in Zurich, he managed to receive two yellows within the span of a minute shortly after halftime. He was further plagued with injury for the remainder of 2021. He supplied his first goal contribution since his return on 24 April 2022, in a 3–1 victory over Lausanne-Sport.

On 23 January 2023, he extended his contract with Grasshoppers for a further year until June 2024. On 10 May 2023, he was honored for playing his 200th game for Grasshoppers over his two engagements at the club, including ten appearances in European qualifiers, 19 cup games, and over 170 league appearances.

On 29 February 2024, Grasshoppers announced that Abrashi's contract had been extended for a further season, until June 2025. He played his 250th game in the Grasshopper dress on 21 September 2024. He agreed to another contract extension on 10 December 2024, keeping him at the club for a further year until summer 2026.

Two severe injuries in summer and autumn 2025 would see him sidelined for the majority of the 2025–26 season. On 10 April 2026, his contract was extended for a further year. On 24 May 2026 Abrashi became the decisive figure in a 2–1 victory over Aarau in the Super League play-off final, which secured their top-flight spot for another season, and despite suffering a heavy facial injury and bleeding after a 104th-minute challenge, he continued playing until the end.

== International career ==
=== Switzerland ===
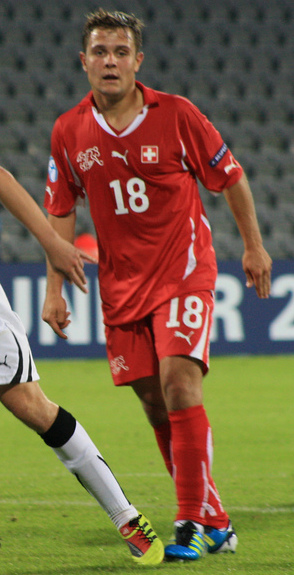
Abrashi playing for Switzerland U21 at the UEFA Euro U21 2011

Amir Abrashi was an important player of Swiss youth national teams, earning more than 40 caps in total. The highlights of his career for Switzerland were the achievement of runner-up at the 2011 UEFA European Under-21 Championship, coming on as a second-half substitute in the final against Spain (0–2), and the subsequent participation in the 2012 Summer Olympics as a regular player where Switzerland lost in the group games against the later gold medalist Mexico (0–1) and Bronze Medal winner South Korea (1–2), while achieving a 1–1 draw against Gabun.

Abrashi, who was serving for the Swiss Army, repeatedly stated his wish to play for the Swiss national team in the future: "That's no question for me. I grew up here and I feel like a Swiss." However, the big competition for a spot in the Swiss national team on his position of central midfield by such players as Valon Behrami, team captain Gökhan Inler, Granit Xhaka, Blerim Dzemaili, Pajtim Kasami, Gelson Fernandes, Fabian Frei, or Pirmin Schwegler made him reconsider his decision. In a long talk with Ottmar Hitzfeld in May 2013, the Swiss national team coach told Abrashi that he is following his development closely and would like Abrashi to play for Switzerland in the future, but given the competition on his position, he would need patience in order to catch a regular spot in the team. After this talk, Abrashi decided to play for the Albanian football association in the future, stating: "It hurts that I can't play for Switzerland, which would have been my first choice, but the step to become a national team player is important in this stage of my career as a footballer. I cannot wait until I'm 26."

=== Albania ===
To become eligible to represent Albania, Abrashi and his parents, who hail from Kosovo, had to apply for Albanian citizenship. On 24 May 2013, he received Albanian citizenship alongside four fellow Albanian international players at the time, Jurgen Gjasula, Ilir Berisha, Azdren Llullaku and Vullnet Basha. He received his first call-up from manager Gianni De Biasi later that month for the 2014 FIFA World Cup qualifier against Norway. On 3 June, FIFA authorised him to represent Albania in official international matches. Abrashi made his international debut on 14 August 2013 in a 2–0 friendly win over Armenia, starting the match and playing 76 minutes. He subsequently made his competitive debut in the 2014 FIFA World Cup qualification against Slovenia on 6 September, coming on for the final ten minutes in a 1–0 away defeat. He made three appearances in Albania's unsuccessful qualifying campaign, as they finished fifth in Group E with 11 points.

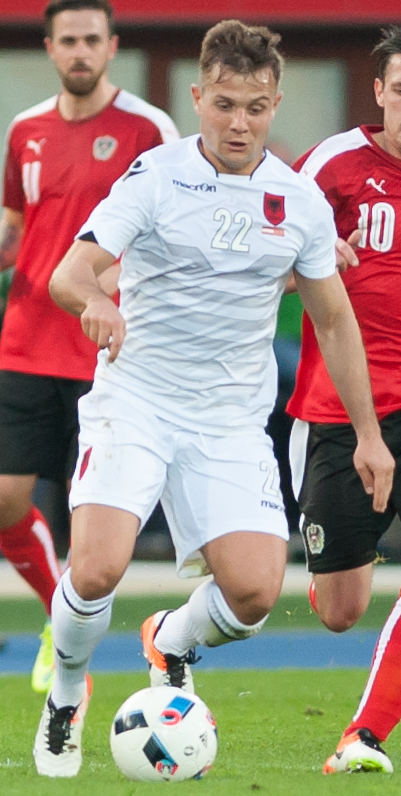
Abrashi with Albania in 2016

On 21 May 2016, Abrashi was named in Albania's preliminary 27-man squad for UEFA Euro 2016, before being included in the final 23-man squad on 31 May. He played in all three of Albania's group matches, against Switzerland, hosts France and Romania, as Albania finished third in Group A with three points. Despite recording a 1–0 victory over Romania in their final match, Albania were eliminated after finishing last among the third-placed teams.

Abrashi was included in Albania's 26-man squad for UEFA Euro 2024 in Germany, but did not make an appearance as Albania were eliminated in the group stage.

On 16 November 2025, Abrashi's retirement from international football was announced during a ceremony organised by the Albanian Football Association, ahead of Albania's final World Cup qualifier against England. His final international appearance had come exactly one year earlier, in a 0–0 2024–25 UEFA Nations League C draw against Czechia.

== Personal life ==
Following Albania's historic participation at UEFA Euro 2016, Abrashi was among the members of the national team who were issued diplomatic passports by the Albanian government in recognition of their achievement.

== Career statistics ==
=== Club ===
As of 21 November 2026

Appearances and goals by club, season and competition
Club	Season	League			Cup		Europe		Total	
Club	Season	Division	Apps	Goals	Apps	Goals	Apps	Goals	Apps	Goals
FC Winterthur II	2006–07	1. Liga Classic	2	0	—		—		2	0
FC Winterthur II	2007–08	1. Liga Classic	16	2	—		—		16	2
FC Winterthur II	Total		18	2	—		—		18	2
FC Winterthur	2007–08	Swiss Super League	3	0	0	0	—		3	0
FC Winterthur	2008–09	Swiss Super League	24	1	0	0	—		24	1
FC Winterthur	2009–10	Swiss Super League	28	3	3	1	—		31	4
FC Winterthur	Total		55	4	3	1	—		58	5
Grasshoppers	2010–11	Swiss Super League	27	1	4	3	2 (Note: Appearance(s) in UEFA Europa League)	0	33	4
Grasshoppers	2011–12	Swiss Super League	15	0	1	0	—		16	0
Grasshoppers	2012–13	Swiss Super League	27	3	6	0	—		33	3
Grasshoppers	2013–14	Swiss Super League	32	0	4	1	4 (Note: Two appearances in UEFA Champions League, two appearances in UEFA Europa League)	0	40	1
Grasshoppers	2014–15	Swiss Super League	26	2	3	0	4 (Note: Two appearances and one goal in UEFA Champions League, two appearances in UEFA Europa League)	1	33	3
Grasshoppers	Total		118	6	18	4	10	1	155	11
SC Freiburg	2015–16	2. Bundesliga	33	3	1	0	—		34	3
SC Freiburg	2016–17	Bundesliga	20	1	1	0	—		21	1
SC Freiburg	2017–18	Bundesliga	12	0	1	0	2	0	15	0
SC Freiburg	2018–19	Bundesliga	10	0	0	0	–		10	0
SC Freiburg	2019–20	Bundesliga	13	0	0	0	–		13	0
SC Freiburg	2020–21	Bundesliga	5	0	0	0	–		5	0
SC Freiburg	Total		93	4	3	0	2	0	98	4
SC Freiburg II	2019–20	Regionalliga Südwest	1	0	—		—		1	0
Basel	2020–21	Swiss Super League	10	0	—		—		10	0
Grasshoppers	2021–22	Swiss Super League	19	0	0	0	—		19	0
Grasshoppers	2022–23	Swiss Super League	27	0	1	0	—		28	0
Grasshoppers	2023–24	Swiss Super League	38 (Note: Includes appearances in the relegation play-off)	0	1	0	—		39	0
Grasshoppers	2024–25	Swiss Super League	32	0	3	0	—		35	0
Grasshoppers	2025–26	Swiss Super League	11	0	2	0	—		13	0
Grasshoppers	2026–27	Swiss Super League	14	2	1	0	—		15	2
Grasshoppers	Total		141	2	7	0	0	0	148	2
Career total			434	18	32	5	12	1	478	24

=== International ===
As of match played 16 November 2024

Appearances and goals by national team and year
National team	Year	Apps	Goals
Albania	2013	4	0
Albania	2014	8	0
Albania	2015	4	0
Albania	2016	8	0
Albania	2017	3	0
Albania	2018	0	0
Albania	2019	10	1
Albania	2020	5	0
Albania	2021	4	0
Albania	2022	6	0
Albania	2024	1	0
Total		51	1

Scores and results list Albania's goal tally first, score column indicates score after each Abrashi goal.

List of international goals scored by Amir Abrashi
No.	Date	Venue	Opponent	Score	Result	Competition
1	25 March 2019	Estadi Nacional, Andorra la Vella, Andorra	Andorra	3–0	3–0	UEFA Euro 2020 qualification

== Honours ==
Grasshoppers

- Swiss Cup: 2012–13
- Swiss Super League runner-up: 2012–13, 2013–14

SC Freiburg

- 2. Bundesliga: 2015–16

Switzerland U21

- UEFA Under-21 European Championship runner-up: 2011
