= Mohamed Coulibaly (footballer, born 1988) =

Senegalese footballer (born 1988)

Personal information
- Full name: Mohamed Aly Coulibaly
- Date of birth: 7 August 1988 (age 38)
- Place of birth: Bakel, Senegal
- Height: 1.78 m (5 ft 10 in)
- Positions: Winger; forward

Senior career*
| Years | Team | Apps | (Gls) |
| 2007–2009 | Gueugnon | | |
| 2009–2011 | Saint-Louis Neuweg | | |
| 2011 | Dornach | | |
| 2011–2013 | Grasshoppers | 10 | (0) |
| 2013–2015 | Bournemouth | 7 | (0) |
| 2014 | → Coventry City (loan) | 4 | (0) |
| 2015 | → Port Vale (loan) | 4 | (0) |
| 2015–2017 | Racing de Santander | 59 | (9) |
| 2017 | Logroñés | 8 | (4) |
| 2017–2021 | Vaduz | 103 | (20) |
| 2021–2024 | Dornach | | |
| Total | | 195 | (33) |
- * Club domestic league appearances and goals

Mohamed Aly Coulibaly (born 7 August 1988) is a Senegalese former professional footballer who played as a winger or forward.

Coulibaly has played in France, Switzerland, England and Spain for Gueugnon, Saint-Louis Neuweg, Dornach and Grasshoppers, Bournemouth, Coventry City, Port Vale, Racing de Santander, Logroñés and Vaduz. He scored two goals in the 2020 Swiss Challenge League play-offs to help Vaduz win promotion into the Swiss Super League. He returned to Dornach in 2021.

== Career ==
=== Early career ===
Born in Bakel, Senegal, Coulibaly began his football career in France with Gueugnon, who at that time played in the Ligue 2, signing his first professional contract at 19 years old during the summer of 2007. However, having played only 45 minutes with their first team, he suffered an ankle injury. Following his recovery, he moved on to Saint-Louis Neuweg in the fifth tier of the French football league system.

In 2011, Coulibaly joined the Swiss amateur side Dornach in the third tier of the Swiss football league system before moving on to Grasshoppers of the Swiss Super League later that year. He made five appearances in their 2012–13 season as Grasshoppers finished second in the league. He was also an unused substitute in the Swiss Cup final; as they beat Basel on penalties.

=== Bournemouth ===
Coulibaly signed with Championship club Bournemouth in July 2013. Later that month he spoke about his respect for manager Eddie Howe. Throughout the first half of the 2013–14 season Coulibaly suffered a number of injuries, though in January 2014 it was revealed he was close to returning after 14 weeks out.

Coulibaly moved on loan to League One side Coventry City in July 2014. He played eight games for Steven Pressley's "Sky Blues" before his loan was terminated due to "personal reasons" in November 2014. He moved on loan to Port Vale in March 2015. Following Bournemouth's promotion to the Premier League, Coulibaly was released at the end of the 2014–15 season.

=== Spain ===
In July 2015, Coulibaly signed a two-year deal with Racing de Santander, newly relegated to Segunda División B. He scored eight goals in 41 appearances in the 2015–16 campaign to help Santander to win the division, however, they failed to achieve promotion after losing to Reus in the play-offs. He left the club after his contract was cancelled on 31 January 2017.

Coulibaly joined Segunda División B club Logroñés in April 2017 on a deal running until the end of the 2016–17 season. On 14 May, he scored a hat-trick in a 5–1 victory over Gernika at the Estadio Las Gaunas.

=== Vaduz ===
On 5 July 2017, Coulibaly signed with Liechtenstein-based Swiss Challenge League side Vaduz. The club won the Liechtenstein Football Cup in 2018 with a 3–0 victory over FC Balzers and defeated FC Ruggell 3–2 in the 2019 final to secure the trophy for the seventh successive time. He scored 13 goals in 39 games during the 2019–20 season as Vaduz finished second behind Lausanne-Sport. They were placed in a play-off game against Thun and gained promotion into the Swiss Super League with a 5–4 aggregate victory, with Coulibaly claiming two goals in the away tie at the Stockhorn Arena. Vaduz were relegated after finishing bottom of the Swiss Super League in the 2020–21 campaign; Coulibaly scored two goals in 17 games, both goals coming against Sion.

=== Later career ===
After leaving Vaduz, Coulibaly returned to Dornach, now in the fifth tier of the Swiss football league system. He was the team's top goal scorer in the 2021–22 season.

== Personal life ==
His brothers Karim, Ibrahim and Aly are also professional footballers. Coulibaly completed his apprenticeship as accountant, but now he works as logistician. He lives in Dornach with his wife, who comes from Basel. The pair have two children, a son and a daughter.

== Career statistics ==
Appearances and goals by club, season and competition
| Club | Season | League | | | National cup (Note: Includes Swiss Cup, FA Cup, Copa del Rey) | | League cup (Note: Includes Football League Cup) | | Other | | Total | |
| Club | Season | Division | Apps | Goals | Apps | Goals | Apps | Goals | Apps | Goals | Apps | Goals |
|---|---|---|---|---|---|---|---|---|---|---|---|---|
| Grasshoppers | 2011–12 | Swiss Super League | 5 | 0 | 0 | 0 | — | | — | | 5 | 0 |
| Grasshoppers | 2012–13 | Swiss Super League | 5 | 0 | 0 | 0 | — | | — | | 5 | 0 |
| Grasshoppers | Total | | 10 | 0 | 0 | 0 | 0 | 0 | 0 | 0 | 10 | 0 |
| Bournemouth | 2013–14 | Championship | 7 | 0 | 0 | 0 | 1 | 0 | — | | 8 | 0 |
| Bournemouth | 2014–15 | Championship | 0 | 0 | 0 | 0 | 0 | 0 | — | | 0 | 0 |
| Bournemouth | Total | | 7 | 0 | 0 | 0 | 1 | 0 | 0 | 0 | 8 | 0 |
| Coventry City (loan) | 2014–15 | League One | 4 | 0 | 0 | 0 | 0 | 0 | 2 (Note: Appearances in the EFL Trophy.) | 0 | 6 | 0 |
| Port Vale (loan) | 2014–15 | League One | 4 | 0 | — | | — | | — | | 4 | 0 |
| Racing de Santander | 2015–16 | Segunda División B | 40 | 8 | 1 | 0 | 0 | 0 | 0 | 0 | 41 | 8 |
| Racing de Santander | 2016–17 | Segunda División B | 19 | 1 | 3 | 0 | 0 | 0 | 0 | 0 | 22 | 1 |
| Racing de Santander | Total | | 59 | 9 | 4 | 0 | 0 | 0 | 0 | 0 | 63 | 9 |
| Logroñés | 2016–17 | Segunda División B | 8 | 4 | 0 | 0 | — | | 0 | 0 | 8 | 4 |
| Vaduz | 2017–18 | Swiss Challenge League | 28 | 7 | 0 | 0 | — | | 1 (Note: Appearance(s) in the UEFA Europa League.) | 0 | 29 | 7 |
| Vaduz | 2018–19 | Swiss Challenge League | 28 | 2 | 0 | 0 | — | | 4 | 2 | 32 | 4 |
| Vaduz | 2019–20 | Swiss Challenge League | 31 | 9 | 0 | 0 | — | | 8 (Note: Two appearances in the play-offs; six appearances, two goals in the UEFA Europa League) | 4 | 39 | 13 |
| Vaduz | 2020–21 | Swiss Super League | 16 | 2 | 0 | 0 | — | | 1 | 0 | 17 | 2 |
| Vaduz | Total | | 103 | 20 | 0 | 0 | 0 | 0 | 14 | 6 | 117 | 26 |
| Career total | | | 195 | 33 | 4 | 0 | 1 | 0 | 16 | 6 | 216 | 39 |

== Honours ==
Grasshoppers

- Swiss Cup: 2012–13

Vaduz

- Liechtenstein Football Cup: 2017–18, 2018–19
- Swiss Challenge League play-offs: 2020
