= Endoğan Adili =

Swiss footballer (born 1994)

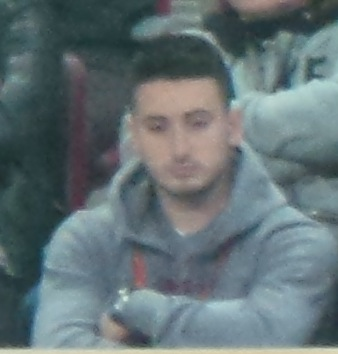

Personal information
- Full name: Endoğan Adili
- Date of birth: 3 August 1994 (age 32)
- Place of birth: Brugg, Switzerland
- Height: 1.70 m (5 ft 7 in)
- Position: Midfielder

Youth career
- FC Altstetten
- 2003–2010: Grasshopper

Senior career*
Years	Team	Apps	(Gls)
2010–2012	Grasshopper	23	(2)
2013–2014	Basel	2	(0)
2014–2018	Galatasaray	0	(0)
2015–2016	→ FC Wil (loan)	3	(0)
2018–2019	FC Kosova	10	(3)
2019–2020	Young Fellows Juventus	15	(0)
2020–2022	FC Kosova	32	(1)

International career
2009–2010	Switzerland U16	7	(3)
2010–2011	Switzerland U17	11	(2)
2011	Switzerland U18	3	(2)
2012	Switzerland U19	7	(1)
2012	Switzerland U20	1	(0)
- * Club domestic league appearances and goals

Endogan Adili (Turkish: Endoğan Adili; born 3 August 1994) is a Swiss former professional footballer who plays as a midfielder.

== Career ==
=== Grasshoppers ===
Adili started his youth football with local club FC Altstetten Zürich, but came through the ranks playing in the Grasshopper Club Zürich youth system.

On 13 May 2010 the midfielder made his Swiss Super League debut for the GC first team during the away match in the Stadion Brügglifeld against FC Aarau and he scored his first goal only 10 minutes after being substituted in. As he made his debut in the GC professional team, Adili was still a member of their U-16 youth team and he was just 15 years and 283 days old, this made him the youngest player to score a goal in a top-level European football league since World War II. Only later, during the summer break before the 2010–11 season, did he advance to their U-18 team.

Adili played 15 games for GC during the 2010–11 season and 5 games in the 2011–12 season, but in December 2011 he suffered a cruciate ligament injury, from which he took over six months to recover, and hereafter he struggled to return into their first team squad.

=== Basel ===
On 17 December 2012 FC Basel announced that they had signed Adili on a three-and-a-half-year contract (with an additional one-year option). He made his first team league debut as a substitute, playing 31 minutes, on 1 June 2013 in the 1–0 home win in St. Jakob-Park against St. Gallen. At the end of the Swiss Super League season 2012–13, Adili won the Championship title and was Swiss Cup runner up with Basel. In the 2012–13 UEFA Europa League Basel advanced as far as the semi-finals, there being matched against the reigning UEFA Champions League holders Chelsea, but were knocked out being beaten 2–5 on aggregate.

At the end of the 2013–14 Super League season Adili won his second league championship with Basel. They also reached the final of the 2013–14 Swiss Cup, but were beaten 2–0 by Zürich after extra time. During the 2013–14 Champions League season Basel reached the group stage and finished the group in third position. Thus they qualified for Europa League knockout phase and here they advanced as far as the quarter-finals.

=== Galatasaray ===
Adili was under contract with Galatasaray from July 2014 to July 2018. For the 2015/16 season, Adili was loaned to FC Wil. On 13 July 2018, his contract with Galatasaray was terminated.

=== Later career ===
Returning to Switzerland in August 2018, he joined FC Kosova Swiss 1. Liga club, FC Kosova, before moving to Swiss Promotion League club SC Young Fellows Juventus in January 2019. However, he returned to FC Kosova in January 2020.

== International career ==
Adili was captain of the Swiss U16-squad and he scored 3 goals in 7 matches for the team. Adili made his Switzerland U-17 debut on 18 May 2010 in the 3–0 defeat against the Portugal U-17 team. He was the youngest player of the Swiss U-17 squad at the 2010 U-17 European championships final tournament, but he came in as a substitute in all 3 matches, playing a total of 94 minutes.

Adili made his Swiss U-18 debut on 30 August 2011 in the 5–0 win against the Estonia U-18 team and made his debut for the Swiss U-19 team 8 September 2012 during the 1–0 defeat in the game against the France U-19.

== Titles and honours ==
Basel

- Swiss Super League champion (2): 2012–13, 2013–14
- Swiss Cup runner up (2): 2012–13, 2013–14
- Uhren Cup winner (1): 2013
