= Anatole Ngamukol =

Footballer (born 1988)

Personal information
- Full name: Anat Roméo Cédric Ngamukol
- Date of birth: 15 January 1988 (age 38)
- Place of birth: Aubervilliers, France
- Height: 1.76 m (5 ft 9 in)
- Position: Forward

Youth career
- 2002–2004: Red Star
- 2004–2007: Reims

Senior career*
Years	Team	Apps	(Gls)
2007–2009	Reims	2	(0)
2009	Zaragoza B	21	(7)
2009–2010	Palencia	14	(2)
2010–2011	Roye-Noyon	25	(10)
2011–2012	Wil	27	(7)
2012–2013	Thun	17	(6)
2013–2015	Grasshoppers	71	(16)
2015–2017	Red Star	67	(18)
2017–2019	Reims	26	(1)
2019	Fortuna Köln	11	(0)
2020	Fréjus Saint-Raphaël	2	(0)
2020–2022	Paris 13 Atletico	22	(3)
Total		305	(70)

International career
2010	Equatorial Guinea U20	1	(0)
- * Club domestic league appearances and goals

Anat Roméo Cédric Ngamukol (born 15 January 1988) is a former professional footballer who played as a forward. Born in France, he received call-ups to teams representing the Democratic Republic of the Congo and Equatorial Guinea.

== Early life ==
Ngamukol was born in 1988 in Aubervilliers, in the northeastern suburbs of Paris, to a Zairean father born in Angola. He acquired French nationality on 28 July 1997, through the collective effect of his father's naturalization.

== Club career ==
Ngamukol began his career with Reims being promoted in 2007 to the French Championnat National team. After three years with Reims senior side he signed a contract with Real Zaragoza B in January 2009. On 20 August 2009, Palencia signed him on a free transfer until June 2010.

Ngamukol helped Reims win the 2017–18 Ligue 2, helping promote them to the Ligue 1 for the 2018–19 season.

In June 2018, he was forced to train separately, and in July he was one of three players Reims were looking to transfer. In December he filed a complaint against the club for "harassment".

On 30 January 2019, Ngamukol joined 3. Liga side Fortuna Köln. He left the club at the end of the season and remained without club until February 2020, when he joined Fréjus Saint-Raphaël in the Championnat National 2.

In August 2020, Ngamukol signed for Paris 13 Atletico, a team playing in the fourth tier of French football.

== International career ==
When Ngamukol played in Spain for Palencia, he was a teammate of Equatoguinean international Benjamín Zarandona, who invited him to join Equatorial Guinea team. In April 2010, he was called up by the Equatoguinean national under-20 football team for the second match against Gabon in the African Youth Championship 2011 Qualifying preliminary round. Although his age was then 22, Ngamukol was selected as one of the three over-age players allowed to be included.

In July 2010, Ngamukol received his first call-up to the Equatorial Guinea senior team, to play a friendly match against Morocco on 11 August 2010, but he did not travel to the game. Because of this, Ngamukol is still also available to be selected by the senior teams of France and DR Congo, and in September 2014, he was called up by the DR Congo.

== Honours ==
Reims

- Ligue 2: 2017–18

Grasshoppers

- Swiss Cup: 2012–13

Paris 13 Atletico

- Championnat National 2: 2021–22
