= Milan Vilotić =

Serbian footballer

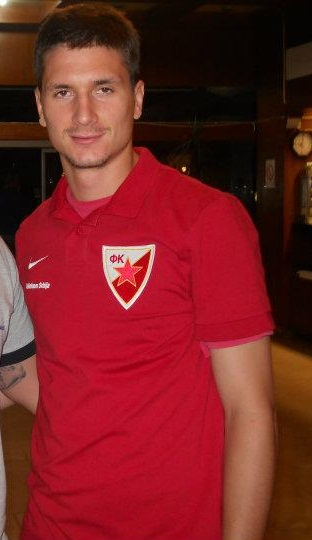
- Vilotić with Red Star Belgrade in 2011

Personal information
- Date of birth: 21 October 1986 (age 40)
- Place of birth: Belgrade, SFR Yugoslavia
- Height: 1.87 m (6 ft 2 in)
- Position: Centre-back

Senior career*
Years	Team	Apps	(Gls)
2004–2009	Čukarički	80	(5)
2006	→ Lokomotiva Beograd (loan)	15	(1)
2009–2012	Red Star Belgrade	47	(2)
2012–2014	Grasshoppers	44	(4)
2014–2017	Young Boys	56	(7)
2017–2018	Grasshoppers	34	(2)
2018–2020	St. Gallen	16	(0)
Total		292	(21)

International career
2011	Serbia	3	(0)
- * Club domestic league appearances and goals

Milan Vilotić (Serbian Cyrillic: Милан Вилотић; born 21 October 1986) is a Serbian former professional footballer who played as centre-back.

== Club career ==
=== Čukarički ===
Born in Belgrade, Vilotić first played professional football with Čukarički from the age of 18. He played over 80 matches for Čukarički from 2004, debuting with one of the best generation of Čukarički players which included Miloš Ninković.

=== Red Star Belgrade ===
In summer 2009 he transferred to Red Star Belgrade. In 2010, however, he was diagnosed with a potentially life-threatening condition and missed half of the 2010–11 season. After the second half of the season, Vilotić was showing promising potential and was promoted to captain of Red Star for a brief period in the 2011 summer off-season. However, at the half-time of a friendly match with F.C. Ashdod, Red Star coach Robert Prosinečki got upset at Vilotić and said in a subsequent conference that he was demoted from being Red Star's captain. By late November 2011, he was also openly accused in the media by his teammate Cristian Borja of creating a bad atmosphere in the squad with the intention of sabotaging the foreign players that were playing in Red Star at the time.

=== Grasshoppers ===
In July 2012, Vilotić signed with Grasshopper Club Zürich on a bosman move. He quickly became the team's most reliable centre-back and scored a penalty after over-time in the 2013 Schweizer Cup Final.

=== Young Boys ===
On 31 January 2014, Vilotić moved to the league rivals BSC Young Boys, ending a two-year playing spell with Grasshopper.

== International career ==
Milan was part of the 2009 UEFA European Under-21 Football Championship Serbian squad and has played for the Serbia national under-21 football team. In April 2010 national team coach Radomir Antić selected him in Serbia squad for a friendly match against Japan in Osaka, but Vilotić failed to debut due to stomach problems. In May 2011, he received another call up and played his first game in a Serbia jersey against Australia. He would earn two more caps that year. In November 2013 Vilotić showed interest in playing for Montenegro on international level.

== Illness ==
In August 2010, after a medical screening he has been diagnosed with a malignant tumor on right scapula that had threatened to end his playing career. After a surgical intervention in Bologna, and a period of recovery, during which he had the undivided support of the public in Serbia, in January 2011 doctors confirmed that he could play professional football again.

== Career statistics ==
=== Club ===
As of 31 January 2014

Club performance			League		Cup		Continental		Total	
Season	Club	League	Apps	Goals	Apps	Goals	Apps	Goals	Apps	Goals
Serbia			League		Serbian Cup		Europe		Total	
2009–10	Red Star	SuperLiga	28	2	0	0	2	0	30	2
2010–11	Red Star	SuperLiga	10	0	2	0	2	0	14	0
2011–12	Red Star	SuperLiga	9	0	1	0	3	0	13	0
Switzerland			League		Schweizer Cup		Europe		Total	
2012–13	Grasshopper	Super League	31	2	4	0	2	0	37	2
2013–14	Grasshopper	Super League	13	2	2	1	2	0	17	3
			League		Cup		Continental		Total	
Total	Serbia		47	2	3	0	7	0	57	2
Total	Switzerland		44	4	6	1	4	0	54	5
Career total			91	6	9	1	11	0	111	7

== Honours ==
=== Club ===
Red Star

- Serbian Cup (2): 2009–10, 2011–12

Grasshoppers

- Swiss Cup: 2012–13

=== Individual ===
- Serbian SuperLiga Team of the Season: 2009–10 (with Red Star)
- Swiss Super League Team of the Year: 2013–14
