= Yves Oehri =

Liechtenstein footballer (born 1987)

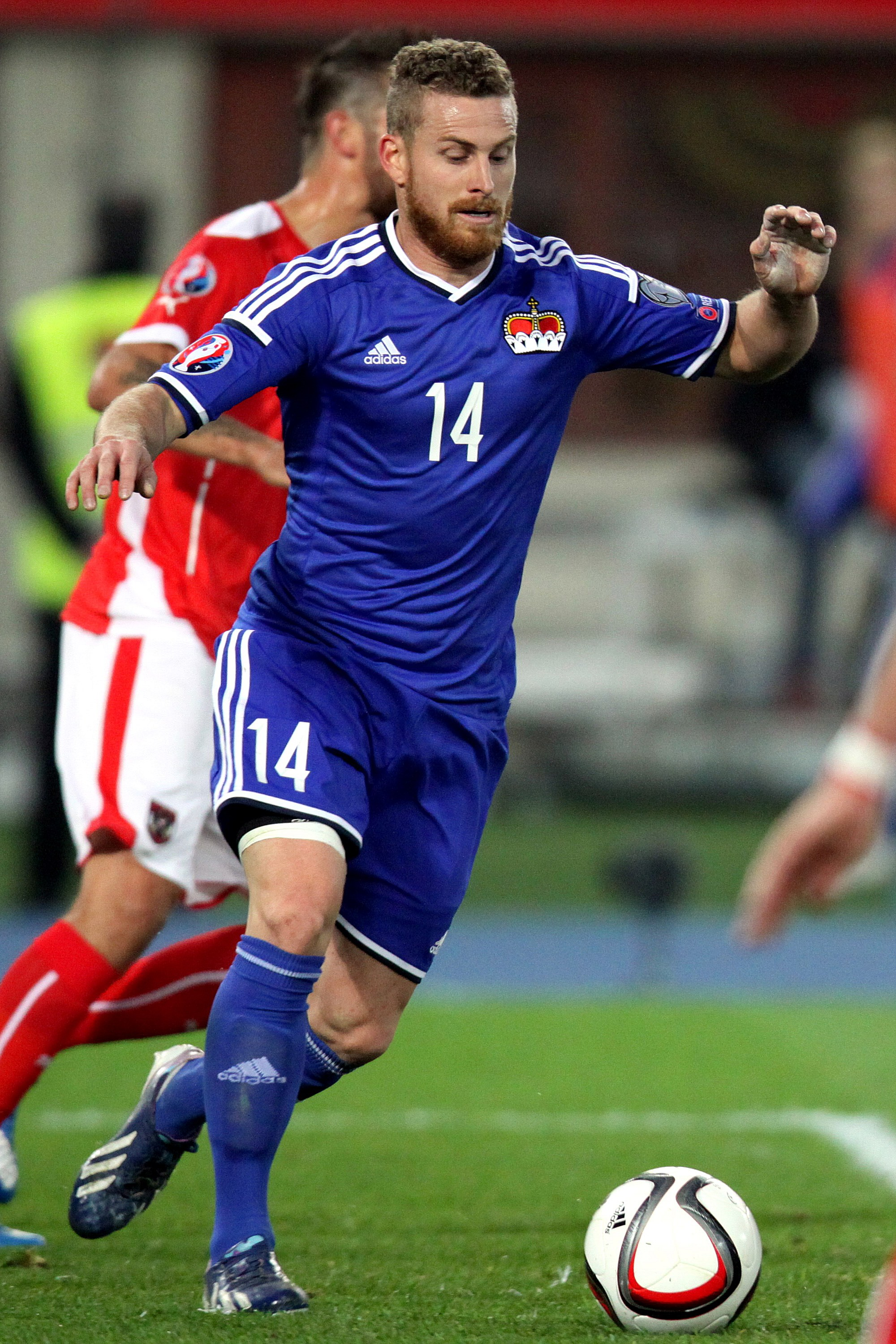

Personal information
- Date of birth: 15 March 1987 (age 39)
- Place of birth: Nürensdorf, Switzerland
- Height: 1.72 m (5 ft 7 1/2 in)
- Position: Right back

Senior career*
Years	Team	Apps	(Gls)
2006–2008	FC Winterthur II	34	(0)
2008–2010	FC St. Gallen	3	(0)
2010–2013	FC Vaduz	35	(0)
2013–2017	YF Juventus	58	(0)
2017–2021	FC Bassersdorf	10	(0)
2021–2023	FC Greifensee	0	(0)

International career^{‡}
2006–2017	Liechtenstein	54	(0)
- * Club domestic league appearances and goals as of 26 June 2023 ‡ National team caps and goals as of 22 June 2017

Yves Oehri (born 15 March 1987) is a retired footballer who played as a right back. Born in Switzerland, he represented the Liechtenstein national team.

== Career ==
Born in Nürensdorf, Switzerland, Oehri made his senior debut in 2006 for FC Winterthur II, before moving to FC St. Gallen in 2008. He signed for FC Vaduz in 2010.

== International career ==
Oehri made his international debut for Liechtenstein in 2006.
