= Stéphane Garcia =

Swiss footballer (born 1991)

Personal information
- Full name: Stéphane Garcia
- Date of birth: 4 April 1991 (age 35)
- Place of birth: Geneva, Switzerland
- Height: 1.82 m (6 ft 0 in)
- Position: Midfielder

Senior career*
Years	Team	Apps	(Gls)
2006–2008	Etoile-Carouge FC	12	(1)
2008–2010	Neuchâtel Xamax	1	(0)
2009–2010	→ FC Le Mont (loan)	22	(0)
2010–2012	Etoile-Carouge FC	51	(6)
2012	FC Lugano	7	(0)
- * Club domestic league appearances and goals as of 18 July 2012

Stéphane Garcia (born 4 April 1991) is a Swiss football midfielder.

== Career ==
Garcia began his career with Etoile-Carouge FC, who was promoted to the Swiss Challenge League in summer 2006, after two years joined in July 2008 to Neuchâtel Xamax. He played only one game for Neuchâtel Xamax and joined on 29 June 2009 on loan to FC Le Mont before transferring back to Etoile-Carouge FC. He moved on to FC Lugano in July 2012.
