= Stéphane Grichting =

Swiss footballer (born 1979)

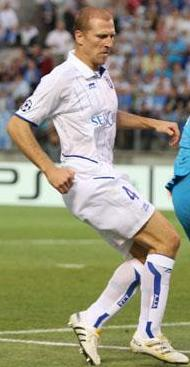

Personal information
- Full name: Stéphane Grichting
- Date of birth: 30 March 1979 (age 47)
- Place of birth: Sierre, Switzerland
- Height: 1.87 m (6 ft 2 in)
- Position: Defender

Youth career
- 1993–1996: Sion

Senior career*
Years	Team	Apps	(Gls)
1996–2002	Sion	124	(5)
2002–2012	Auxerre	250	(1)
2012–2015	Grasshoppers	89	(0)
Total		463	(6)

International career
2004–2011	Switzerland	45	(1)
- * Club domestic league appearances and goals

Stéphane Grichting (born 30 March 1979) is a Swiss former professional footballer who played as a defender. His career began at FC Sion. Grichting then played at AJ Auxerre in France for ten seasons, before moving back to Switzerland to play for Grasshoppers.

He earned 36 caps for the Swiss national team, and was called up to the 2006 FIFA World Cup and 2010 FIFA World Cup squads. He was in the squad for the 2004 European Football Championship, but pulled out due to injury.

After Switzerland beat Turkey in the deciding qualifier to 2006 FIFA World Cup, he was injured in the riots that occurred after the match.

At the end of the 2014–15 season, he retired from professional football at the age of 36.

== International goals ==
No.	Date	Venue	Opponent	Score	Result	Competition	Ref.
1	5 September 2009	St. Jakob-Park, Basel, Switzerland	Greece	1–0	2–0	2010 WCQ	

== Honours ==
Grasshopper

- Swiss Cup: 2012–13
