= Mërgim Brahimi =

Kosovan footballer (born 1992)

Personal information
- Date of birth: 8 August 1992 (age 34)
- Place of birth: Istog, FR Yugoslavia
- Height: 1.72 m (5 ft 8 in)
- Position: Midfielder

Team information
- Current team: YF Juventus
- Number: 21

Youth career
- 1997–2007: Red Star Zürich
- 2007–2012: Grasshopper Club Zürich

Senior career*
Years	Team	Apps	(Gls)
2010–2012	Grasshoppers II	50	(6)
2011–2014	Grasshoppers	31	(3)
2013–2014	→ FC Aarau (loan)	4	(0)
2014	→ FC Wohlen (loan)	13	(5)
2014–2015	FC Wohlen	39	(9)
2015–2018	Grasshoppers	53	(1)
2018	Panionios	10	(0)
2019–2025	Wil	142	(7)
2025–	YF Juventus	32	(6)

International career
2011–2012	Albania U21	10	(1)
2012	Albania	1	(0)
2013–2014	Switzerland U21	11	(3)
2015	Kosovo	2	(2)
- * Club domestic league appearances and goals as of 26 September 2026

Mërgim Brahimi (born 8 August 1992) is a Kosovan professional footballer who plays as a midfielder for Swiss Promotion League club YF Juventus. A youth international for Albania and Switzerland, Brahimi represented the Albania national team before switching to the Kosovo national team.

== Early life ==
Brahimi was born in Istog, FR Yugoslavia to Kosovar Albanian parents. He lived in Istog for two years before moving to Zurich, Switzerland along with his mother, brother and two sisters due to the growing tension in Kosovo. Prior to moving, his father had been living for a number of years in Switzerland as a Gastarbeiter. He then signed for local side FC Red Star Zürich in 1997 before being spotted by Grasshopper Club Zürich in 2007.

== Club career ==
=== Youth clubs ===
At the age of five, Brahimi signed for local side FC Red Star Zürich before being spotted by Grasshopper Zürich in 2007. Brahimi moved up the ranks of the youth divisions at Grasshopper Zürich, eventually playing for the under-21s in 2010. In the under-21s, Brahimi made a total of thirty two appearances and scored three goals before joining the senior team.

=== Grasshopper Club Zürich ===
Brahimi made his first team appearance against city rivals FC Zürich on 2 October 2011. He came on in the 21st minute and made a good impact, in a game that was later abandoned due to FC Zürich fan violence. A 3–0 victory was awarded to GC.

Brahimi made his first starting appearance in the second round of the Schweizer Cup against FC Chiasso on 16 October 2011. He started the game and was substituted in the 77th minute for Davor Landeka in the 1–0 win.

=== Panionios ===
On 14 January 2018, Panionios officially announced the capture of Kosovo-Albanian Mërgim Brahimi. The 25-year-old international (with Kosovo National Team) attacking midfielder will replace experienced Iranian attacking midfielder Masoud Shojaei who recently joined rivals AEK Athens.

=== FC Wil ===
On 3 June 2019, it was confirmed that Brahimi a two-year contract with FC Wil with an option to one further year.

== International career ==
Originating from Kosovo with ethnic Albanian parents and raised in Switzerland, Brahimi was eligible to play for Switzerland, Albania and Kosovo if a national team should be formed, but in March 2011 he answered the call by Albania's Under-21 coach Artan Bushati for a non official friendly tournament held in Slovenia.

On 26 August 2011 Brahimi was called up by Switzerland U-20 for two friendlies against Italy and Germany in September, but he refused the offer and decided to represent Albania instead.

He officially gained Albanian citizenship on 26 August 2011 along with his Grasshopper teammate Imran Bunjaku, in order to compete in the UEFA Under-21 Championship qualifiers .

=== Albania senior team ===
He received his first senior international call up for friendliest by Gianni De Biasi against Qatar and Iran in May 2012.

Brahimi made his international debut on 27 May 2012 against Iran, at age of 19.

=== Switzerland under-21 ===
Brahimi switched to play for Switzerland national under-21 football team in 2013–15 season. He scored 2 goals in 4 qualifying matches.

=== Kosovo senior team ===
Brahimi switched his nationality again in 2015. He scored a brace in his debut match for Kosovo national football team, against Equatorial Guinea. He also played another match for Kosovo in November 2015.

He was invited by Albert Bunjaki, in a friendly with Faroe Islands on 3 June 2016. That match was the first match of Kosovo as a member of FIFA. However, as he also played for national teams of Albania and Switzerland, his switch to Kosovo competitively was dependent on the approval of FIFA's Bureau of the Players' Status Committee. Brahimi and Football Federation of Kosovo had to submit a formal request to the committee in order to know the eligibility of Brahimi.

To sum up, Brahimi played twice for Kosovo in friendlies, but did not made his competitive debut yet.

== Career statistics ==
=== Club ===
As of match played 25 March 2020

Appearances and goals by club, season and competition
Club	Season	League			National cup		Continental		Total	
Club	Season	Division	Apps	Goals	Apps	Goals	Apps	Goals	Apps	Goals
Grasshoppers	2011–12	Super League	14	0	2	0	0	0	16	0
Grasshoppers	2012–13	Super League	16	3	3	0	—		19	3
Grasshoppers	2013–14	Super League	1	0	0	0	1 (Note: Appearance in the Champions League)	0	2	0
Grasshoppers	Total		31	3	5	0	1	0	37	3
FC Aarau (loan)	2013–14	Super League	4	0	0	0	—		4	0
FC Wohlen (loan)	2013–14	Challenge League	13	5	0	0	—		13	5
FC Wohlen	2014–15	Challenge League	32	8	2	2	—		34	10
FC Wohlen	2015–16	Challenge League	7	1	0	0	—		7	1
FC Wohlen	Total		39	9	2	2	0	0	41	11
Grasshoppers	2015–16	Super League	22	1	1	0	0	0	23	1
Grasshoppers	2016–17	Super League	29	0	2	0	6 (Note: Appearances in the Europa League)	0	37	0
Grasshoppers	2017–18	Super League	2	0	2	0	—		4	0
Grasshoppers	Total		53	1	5	0	6	0	64	1
Panionios	2017–18	Super League Greece	10	0	3	0	—		13	0
FC Wil	2019–20	Challenge League	20	3	1	0	—		21	3
Career total			170	21	16	2	7	0	193	23

=== International ===
As of 25 March 2020

Appearances and goals by national team and year
National team	Year	Apps	Goals
Albania	2012	1	0
Kosovo	2015	2	0
Total		3	0
