= Josip Colina =

Bosnian-Herzegovinian footballer (born 1980)

Personal information
- Full name: Josip Colina
- Date of birth: November 8, 1980 (age 45)
- Place of birth: Zenica, SR Bosnia and Herzegovina, SFR Yugoslavia
- Height: 1.89 m (6 ft 2 in)
- Positions: Central defender; defensive midfielder

Team information
- Current team: FC Basel (scout)

Youth career
- Nordstern Basel
- –2000: FC Basel

Senior career*
Years	Team	Apps	(Gls)
1998–2000	Basel	2	(0)
2000–2001	→ FC Wangen bei Olten (loan)	30	(0)
2001–2002	→ Concordia Basel (loan)	4	(1)
2002	Varese	1	(0)
2002–2007	Concordia Basel	118	(15)
2007–2012	Grasshopper	102	(1)
2011–2012	→ FC Lugano (loan)	14	(1)

International career
2001–2002	Bosnia and Herzegovina U-21		
- * Club domestic league appearances and goals as of 10:30, 13 March 2009 (UTC)

Josip Colina (Bosnian: Čolina; born 8 November 1980) is a Bosnian-Herzegovinian retired football player. He also holds Swiss citizenship and played most of his football career in Switzerland. He played as central defender and/or defensive midfielder.

== Club career ==
Colina started his youth football with Nordstern Basel but moved at an early age to the youth department of FC Basel. In summer 1998 he advanced to their reserve team (U-21) and, toward the end of their 1998–99 FC Basel season, he was used by first team head coach Marco Schällibaum as substitute. Colina's debut came on 30 May 1999, as he came on in the 73rd minute in the away game as Basel played a 1–1 draw with Xamax.

The following season Colina played solely for the FCB reserve team and was loaned out to FC Wangen bei Olten who had just achieved promotion to the Nationalliga B after being 1st League Group to winners and winning the championship play-offs at the end of the previous season. Colina became regular starter for Wangen b. Olten. However, the team could not avoid immediate relegation. After his one-year loan, Colina returned to his club of origin, but he played again solely for the reserve team. Thus, after three months, the club decided to loan him out again, this time to local team Concordia Basel. They had achieved promotion to the Nationalliga B in the Previous season, as the 1st league champions, and they were looking for players to strengthen their squad. Up until the winter break Colina had four league appearances for Concordia, scoring one goal.

On 6 December 2001 it was announced that Colina had signed a three-and-a-half-year contract with Varese Calcio, who at that time played in the Serie C1, the third highest tier in the Italian football league system. However, during his first six months with the team, he only had one appearance for them and this was in the final game of the season against Carrarese Calcio, in a two all draw on 5 May 2002. As conditions did not improve for the player at the beginning of the 2002–03 season, he was released from his contract, and he returned to Basel and again signed for Concordia. Playing as central defender Colina, became regular starter for the team and regularly scored decisive goals for them, which attracted the interest of the top-level clubs.

On 2 July 2007, Colina signed a contract with Swiss Super League club Grasshopper Club. In his first season with GC, he had not only 19 appearances with their first team, but he also aided in their reserve team. Then, as of the 2008–09 league season, Colina was regular starter for their first team. On 6 March 2010 he scored his first Super League goal and, somewhat ironically, it was against his club of origin in the St. Jakob-Park. It was the first goal of the game, just 135 seconds after the kick-off, as GC won 2–1 against FC Basel.

It was announced on 23 August 2011, that Colina had signed a one-year loan contract with lower-tier club Lugano and at the end of the 2011–12 Challenge League season, Colina retired from his active football career.

== Private life ==
Since May 2014 Colina works as Senior financial controller for IWB (Industrielle Werke Basel). Since January 2014 he works as a scout for FC Basel.

== Sources ==
- Die ersten 125 Jahre. Publisher: Josef Zindel im Friedrich Reinhardt Verlag, Basel. ISBN 978-3-7245-2305-5
- Verein "Basler Fussballarchiv" Homepage
