= Stephan Studer =

Swiss football referee (born 1975)

Stéphan Studer
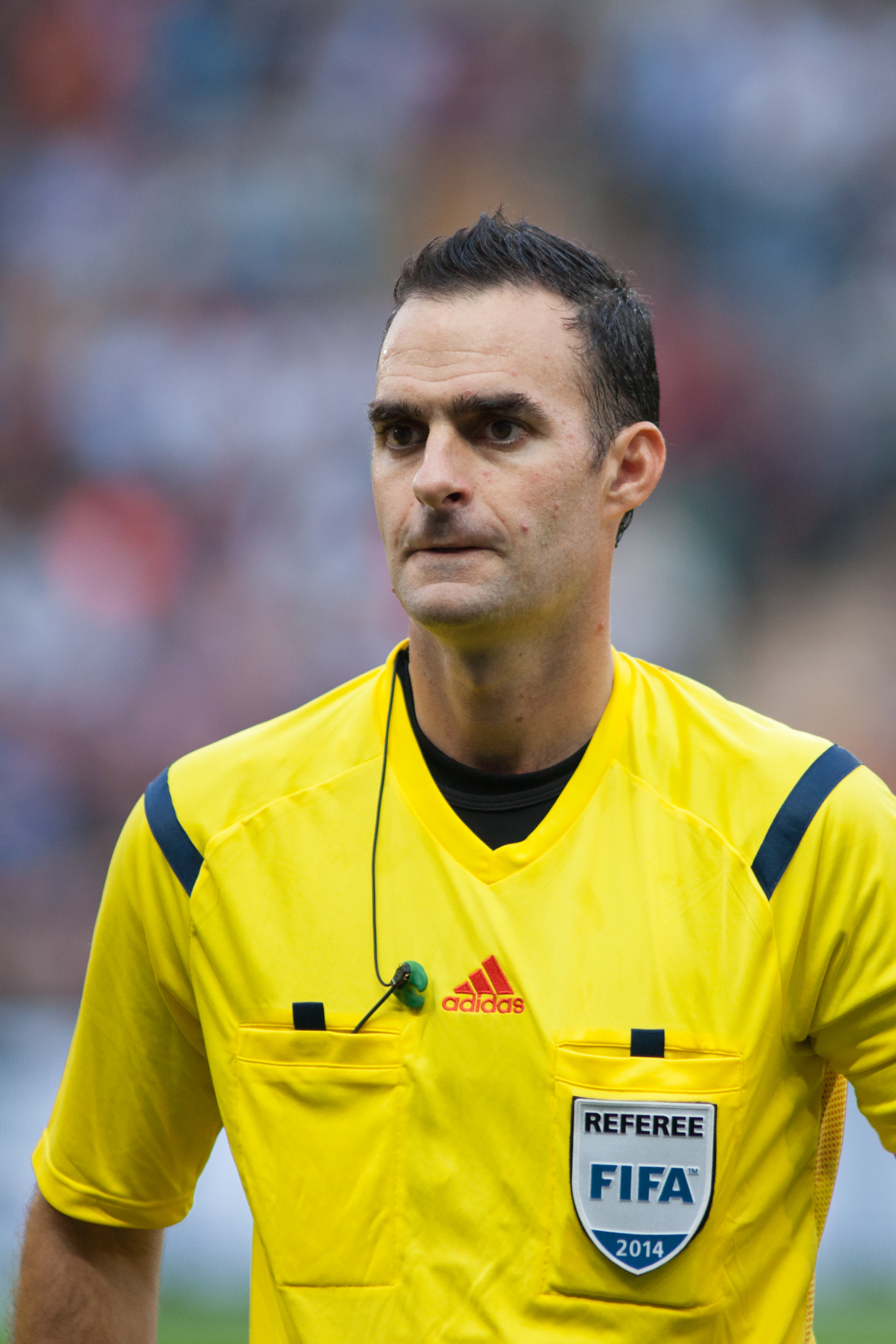
- Studer in 2014
- Full name: Stéphan Studer
- Born: 9 October 1975 (age 51); Switzerland

Domestic
Years	League	Role
2002–2015	Swiss Super League	Referee

International
Years	League	Role
2009–2015	FIFA listed	Referee

Stéphan Studer (born 9 October 1975) is a Swiss international referee who refereed at 2014 FIFA World Cup qualifiers.

Studer became a FIFA referee in 2009. He has officiated at Euro 2012 qualifiers and the 2011 FIFA U-17 World Cup. He was appointed as referee of the 2012–13 Swiss Cup final between FC Basel and Grasshoppers Zürich in the Stade de Suisse, Wankdorf, Bern, on 20 May 2013.

Studer's last match after 12 years as referee was on 29 May 2015 in St. Jakob-Park, Basel as FC Basel beat St. Gallen 4-3 on the last day of the 2014–15 Swiss Super League season.
