= Izet Hajrović =

Bosnian footballer (born 1991)

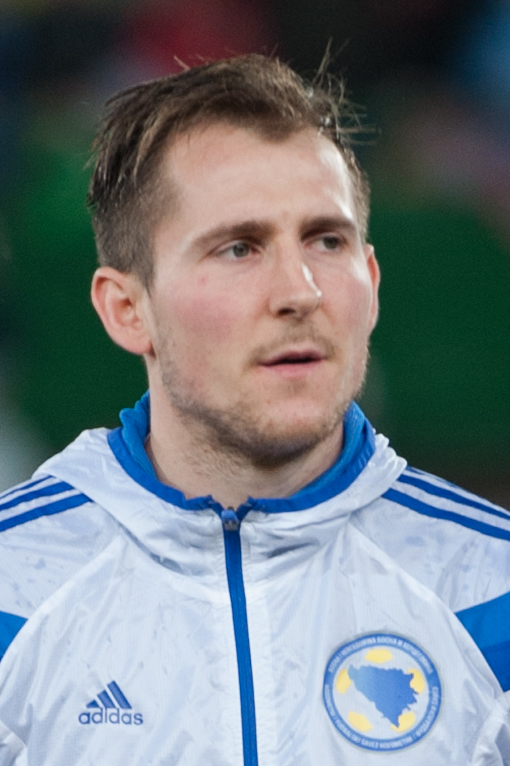
- Hajrović with Bosnia and Herzegovina in 2015

Personal information
- Date of birth: 4 August 1991 (age 35)
- Place of birth: Brugg, Switzerland
- Height: 1.77 m (5 ft 10 in)
- Position: Winger

Youth career
- 1998–1999: FC Birr
- 1999–2000: FC Windisch
- 2000–2009: Grasshoppers

Senior career*
Years	Team	Apps	(Gls)
2009–2014	Grasshoppers	91	(20)
2014	Galatasaray	8	(0)
2014–2018	Werder Bremen	38	(2)
2015–2016	→ Eibar (loan)	7	(0)
2018–2021	Dinamo Zagreb	56	(6)
2021–2023	Aris	9	(0)
Total		209	(28)

International career
2011–2012	Switzerland U20	4	(0)
2011–2012	Switzerland U21	4	(0)
2012	Switzerland	1	(0)
2013–2019	Bosnia and Herzegovina	27	(6)
- * Club domestic league appearances and goals

Izet Hajrović (pronounced [ǐzet xâːjroʋitɕ]; born 4 August 1991) is a former professional footballer who played as a winger. Born in Switzerland, he played for the Bosnia and Herzegovina national team.

Hajrović started his professional career at Grasshoppers, before joining Galatasaray in 2014. Later that year, he moved to Werder Bremen, who loaned him to Eibar in 2015. Three years later, he signed with Dinamo Zagreb. He joined Aris in 2021.

A former Swiss youth international, Hajrović also made his senior international debut for Switzerland, before switching his allegiance to Bosnia and Herzegovina in 2013, earning over 20 caps until 2019. He represented the nation at their first ever major championship, the 2014 FIFA World Cup.

== Club career ==
=== Early career ===
Hajrović started playing football at local clubs, before joining Grasshoppers' youth academy in 2000. He made his professional debut against Luzern on 3 October 2009 at the age of 18. On 19 September 2010, he scored a brace in a triumph over FC Béroche-Gorgier, which were his first professional goals. He scored his first career hat-trick on 17 September 2011 against FC Töss.

=== Galatasaray ===
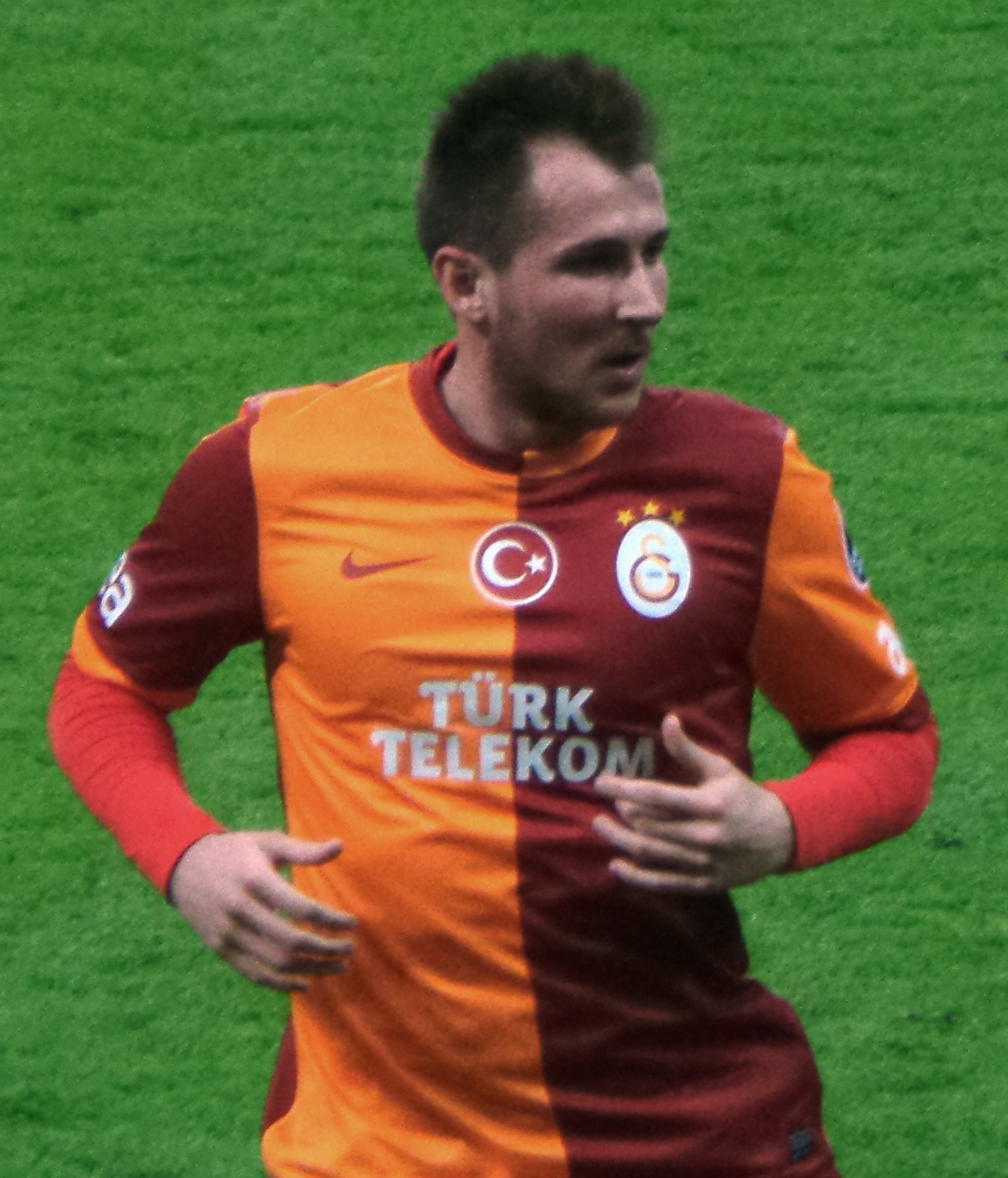
Hajrović playing for Galatasaray in 2014

In January 2014, Hajrović was transferred to Turkish outfit Galatasaray for an undisclosed fee. He made his official debut for the team on 2 February against Bursaspor. On 5 February, he scored his first goal for Galatasaray in a Turkish Cup match against Tokatspor.

Hajrović debuted in the UEFA Champions League against Chelsea on 26 February.

He won his first trophy with the club on 7 May, by beating Eskişehirspor in the Turkish Cup final.

=== Werder Bremen ===
In July, Hajrović signed a four-year contract with German side Werder Bremen. He made his competitive debut for the squad in a DFB-Pokal tie against FV Illertissen on 17 August and managed to score a goal. A week later, he made his league debut against Hertha BSC. On 26 April 2015, he scored his first league goal against SC Paderborn.

In August, Hajrović was sent on a season-long loan to Spanish outfit Eibar.

In December 2016, he suffered a severe knee injury, which was diagnosed as an anterior cruciate ligament tear and was ruled out for at least six months. Over eight months after the injury, on 1 September 2017, he returned to the pitch.

=== Dinamo Zagreb ===
In January 2018, Hajrović moved to Croatian team Dinamo Zagreb on a deal until June 2019. He debuted officially for the side on 10 February against Osijek. On 4 April, he scored his first goal for Dinamo Zagreb in a Croatian Cup fixture against Rijeka. He won his first title with the club on 20 May, when they were crowned league champions. On 2 February 2019, he scored a brace against Rudeš, his first league goals for Dinamo Zagreb.

In July, he extended his contract with the team until June 2021.

=== Aris ===
In June 2021, Hajrović joined Greek outfit Aris on a three-year deal. He debuted competitively for the club in a UEFA Conference League qualifier against Astana on 22 July. Seven weeks later, he made his league debut against OFI.

He announced his retirement from football on 24 September 2025.

== International career ==
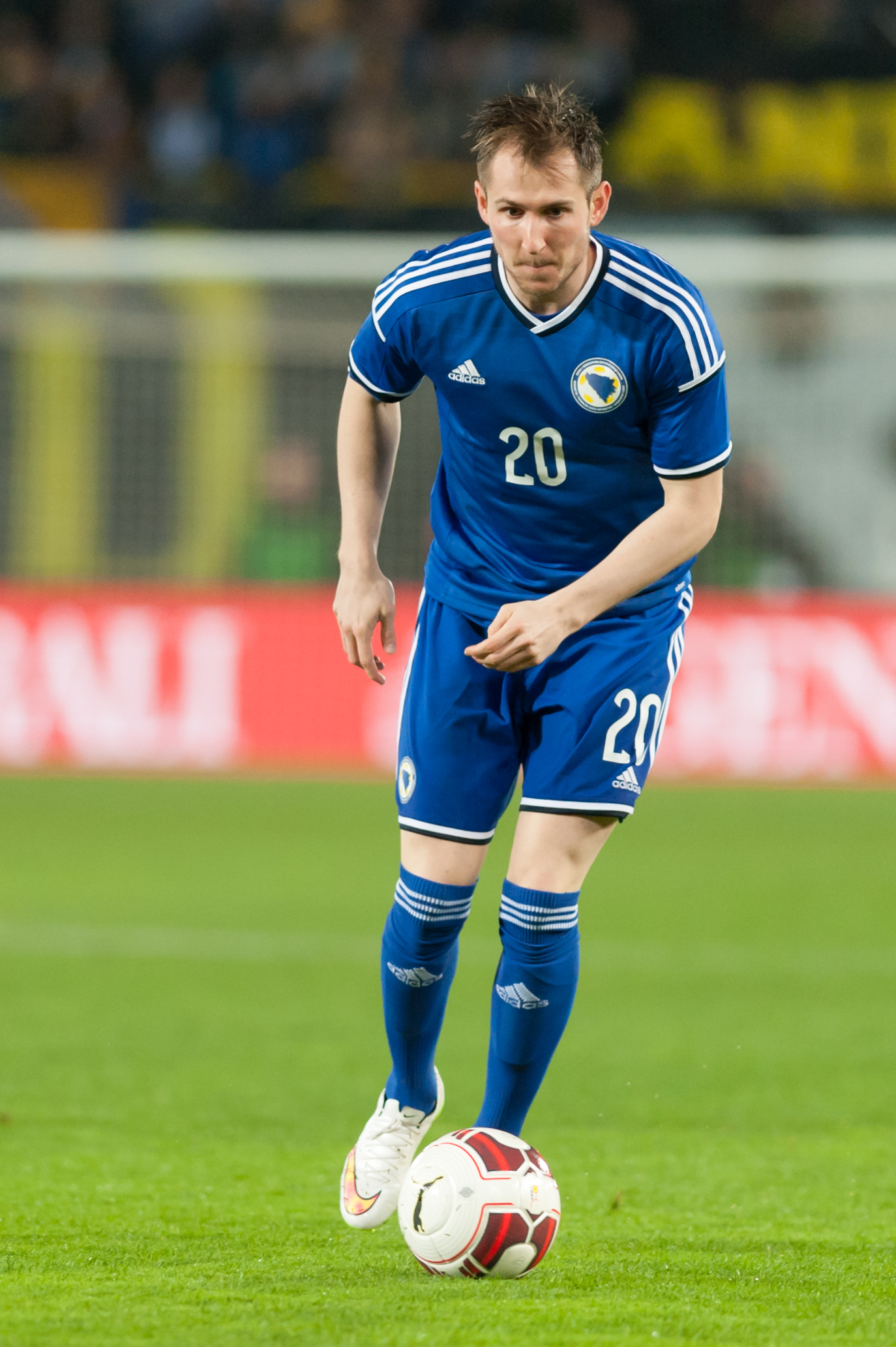
Hajrović playing for Bosnia and Herzegovina in 2015

After representing Switzerland at various youth levels, Hajrović made his senior international debut in a friendly game against Tunisia on 14 November 2012. However, in July 2013, he decided that he would play for Bosnia and Herzegovina in the future.

In August, his request to change sports citizenship from Swiss to Bosnian was approved by FIFA. Later that month, he received his first senior call up, for 2014 FIFA World Cup qualifiers against Slovakia, home and away. He debuted in the home match on 6 September. On 10 September, in the away tie, Hajrović scored his first senior international goal, which secured the victory for his team.

In June 2014, Hajrović was named in Bosnia and Herzegovina's squad for the 2014 FIFA World Cup, country's first ever major competition. He made his tournament debut in the opening group fixture against Argentina on 15 June.

== Personal life ==
Hajrović's younger brother Sead is also a professional footballer.

He married his long-time girlfriend Lejla in May 2014.

Hajrović is a practising Muslim; together with international teammates Ibrahim Šehić, Muhamed Bešić, Armin Hodžić, Sead Kolašinac, Edin Višća and Ervin Zukanović he visited a mosque in Zenica during the national team's concentration.

== Career statistics ==
=== Club ===
Appearances and goals by club, season and competition
Club	Season	League			National cup (Note: Includes Swiss Cup, Turkish Cup, DFB-Pokal, Copa del Rey, Greek Cup)		Continental		Other		Total	
Club	Season	Division	Apps	Goals	Apps	Goals	Apps	Goals	Apps	Goals	Apps	Goals
Grasshoppers	2009–10	Swiss Super League	1	0	0	0	–		–		1	0
Grasshoppers	2010–11	Swiss Super League	21	5	3	2	1 (Note: Appearance in UEFA Europa League)	0	–		25	7
Grasshoppers	2011–12	Swiss Super League	21	1	3	4	–		–		24	5
Grasshoppers	2012–13	Swiss Super League	33	8	4	2	–		–		37	10
Grasshoppers	2013–14	Swiss Super League	15	6	3	0	4 (Note: Two appearances in UEFA Champions League; two appearances in UEFA Europa League)	0	–		22	6
Grasshoppers	Total		91	20	13	8	5	0	–		109	28
Galatasaray	2013–14	Süper Lig	8	0	2	1	2 (Note: Appearances in UEFA Champions League)	0	–		12	1
Werder Bremen	2014–15	Bundesliga	19	1	3	1	–		–		22	2
Werder Bremen	2016–17	Bundesliga	10	1	0	0	–		–		10	1
Werder Bremen	2017–18	Bundesliga	9	0	0	0	–		–		9	0
Werder Bremen	Total		38	2	3	1	–		–		41	3
Eibar (loan)	2015–16	La Liga	7	0	2	1	–		–		9	1
Dinamo Zagreb	2017–18	Croatian Football League	15	0	2	1	–		–		17	1
Dinamo Zagreb	2018–19	Croatian Football League	17	4	4	0	13 (Note: Six appearances, three goals in UEFA Champions League; seven appearances, three goals in UEFA Europa League)	6	–		34	10
Dinamo Zagreb	2019–20	Croatian Football League	11	0	2	0	7	0	1 (Note: Appearance in Croatian Super Cup)	0	21	0
Dinamo Zagreb	2020–21	Croatian Football League	13	2	2	1	0	0	0	0	15	3
Dinamo Zagreb	Total		56	6	10	2	20	6	1	0	87	14
Aris	2021–22	Super League Greece	9	0	0	0	2 (Note: Appearances in UEFA Conference League)	0	–		11	0
Career total			209	28	30	13	29	6	1	0	269	47

=== International ===
Appearances and goals by national team and year
National team	Year	Apps	Goals
Switzerland
Switzerland	2012	1	0
Switzerland	Total	1	0
Bosnia and Herzegovina
Bosnia and Herzegovina	2013	4	1
Bosnia and Herzegovina	2014	9	1
Bosnia and Herzegovina	2015	4	1
Bosnia and Herzegovina	2016	5	0
Bosnia and Herzegovina	2017	2	2
Bosnia and Herzegovina	2018	0	0
Bosnia and Herzegovina	2019	3	1
Bosnia and Herzegovina	Total	27	6
Career total		28	6

Scores and results list Bosnia and Herzegovina's goal tally first, score column indicates score after each Hajrović goal.

List of international goals scored by Izet Hajrović
No.	Date	Venue	Cap	Opponent	Score	Result	Competition
1	10 September 2013	Štadión pod Dubňom, Žilina, Slovakia	2	Slovakia	2–1	2–1	2014 FIFA World Cup qualification
2	3 June 2014	Soldier Field, Chicago, United States	7	Mexico	1–0	1–0	Friendly
3	31 March 2015	Ernst-Happel-Stadion, Vienna, Austria	14	Austria	1–1	1–1	Friendly
4	10 October 2017	A. Le Coq Arena, Tallinn, Estonia	24	Estonia	1–0	2–1	2018 FIFA World Cup qualification
5	10 October 2017	A. Le Coq Arena, Tallinn, Estonia	24	Estonia	2–1	2–1	2018 FIFA World Cup qualification
6	12 October 2019	Bilino Polje, Zenica, Bosnia and Herzegovina	25	Finland	1–0	4–1	UEFA Euro 2020 qualifying

== Honours ==
Grasshoppers

- Swiss Cup: 2012–13

Galatasaray

- Turkish Cup: 2013–14

Dinamo Zagreb

- Croatian Football League: 2017–18, 2018–19, 2019–20, 2020–21
- Croatian Cup: 2017–18, 2020–21
- Croatian Super Cup: 2019
