= Sehar Fejzulahi =

Swiss footballer (born 1985)

Personal information
- Date of birth: 1 June 1985 (age 41)
- Place of birth: Veliki Trnovac, SFR Yugoslavia
- Height: 1.79 m (5 ft 10 in)
- Position: Midfielder

Youth career
- SC Kriens
- 2001–2006: FC Basel

Senior career*
Years	Team	Apps	(Gls)
2004–2006	→ FC Aarau (loan)	43	(1)
2007–2008	FC Winterthur	48	(10)
2008–2009	FC Vaduz	26	(5)
2009–2011	FC Lugano	46	(9)
2011	FC Wil	8	(2)
2012	Grasshopper	6	(0)
2012	FC Aarau	4	(0)
2013–2015	FC Schaffhausen	23	(0)
2014–2015	→ FC Le Mont (loan)	26	(4)
2015–2016	FC Le Mont	22	(2)
2016	FC United Zürich	2	(0)

International career
2005	Switzerland U-21	1	(0)
- * Club domestic league appearances and goals

Sehar Fejzulahi (born 1 June 1985) is a Swiss former football player of Kosovar Albanian descent.

== Club career ==
He signed for FC Winterthur on 11 February 2007 and moved to FC Vaduz in 2008.
