= Frank Feltscher =

Footballer (born 1988)

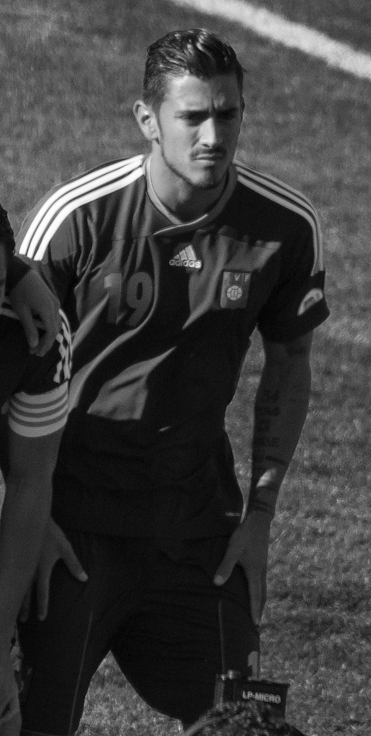
- Feltscher in 2012

Personal information
- Full name: Frank Günther Feltscher Martínez
- Date of birth: 17 May 1988 (age 38)
- Place of birth: Bülach, Switzerland
- Height: 1.79 m (5 ft 10 in)
- Position: Attacking midfielder

Youth career
- 1997-2001: FC Kloten
- 2001-2005: Grasshoppers
- 2005: Winterthur
- 2005-2006: Grasshoppers

Senior career*
Years	Team	Apps	(Gls)
2006–2008	Grasshoppers	21	(2)
2008–2009	Lecce	0	(0)
2009	→ Bellinzona (loan)	15	(0)
2009–2011	Bellinzona	76	(9)
2011–2014	Grasshoppers	86	(6)
2014–2015	Aarau	21	(1)
2015–2016	AEL Limassol	23	(2)
2017	Debreceni VSC	12	(1)
2018–2019	Zulia	65	(21)
2020	Rionegro Águilas	6	(0)
2021	Atlético Venezuela	21	(2)
2022	FC Tuggen	9	(1)
Total		355	(45)

International career
2007-2010	Switzerland U21	18	(5)
2011-2014	Venezuela	15	(2)
- * Club domestic league appearances and goals

Frank Günther Feltscher Martínez (born 17 May 1988) is a former professional footballer who played as an attacking midfielder. Born in Switzerland, he made 15 appearances for the Venezuela national team scoring twice.

== Club career ==
Feltscher was born in Bülach, Switzerland. After emerging through the youth ranks at Grasshoppers, he joined US Lecce in the summer of 2008. He was loaned out to AC Bellinzona until the end of the 2008–09.

== International career ==
Feltscher played for the Switzerland national under-21 team from 2007.

On 2 September 2011, he made the starting line-up for Venezuela national team in a friendly match against Argentina in India.

== Personal life ==
His brother, Rolf Feltscher, plays for MSV Duisburg as a defender and step-brother Mattia Desole, plays for FC Freienbach. Lived in Venezuela for several years as a kid playing football at Colegio Humboldt where he also studied with his brother.

Frank holds Venezuelan, Swiss and Italian passports.

== Career statistics ==
Scores and results list Venezuela's goal tally first, score column indicates score after each Feltscher goal.

List of international goals scored by Frank Feltscher
No.	Date	Venue	Opponent	Score	Result	Competition
1	11 November 2011	Estadio Metropolitano Roberto Meléndez, Barranquilla	Colombia	1–1	1–1	2014 World Cup qualifier
2	14 November 2012	Marlins Park, Miami, Florida	Nigeria	1–2	1–3	Friendly

== Honours ==
Grasshoppers

- Swiss Cup: 2012–13
