= 2012–13 Swiss Cup =

Tournament details
- Country: Switzerland
- Teams: 64

Final positions
- Champions: Grasshopper Club Zürich
- Runners-up: FC Basel

Tournament statistics
- Top goal scorer: Frank Feltscher (8)

The 2012–13 Swiss Cup was the 88th season of Switzerland's annual football cup competition. The competition commenced on 14 September 2012 with the first game of Round 1 and ended on 20 May 2013 with the Final. The winners of the competition, Grasshopper Club Zürich qualified for the play-off round of the 2013–14 UEFA Europa League. They beat defending champions FC Basel in the final.

== Participating clubs ==
All ten Super League and nine Challenge League teams (FC Vaduz are from Liechtenstein and thus play in the 2012–13 Liechtenstein Cup) entered this year's competition, as well as 45 teams from lower leagues. Teams from 1. Liga Promotion and below qualified through separate qualifying rounds within their leagues. Teams from regional leagues qualified by winning the last season's regional cups.

**2012–13 Super League**; 10 teams	**2012–13 Challenge League**; 9 teams	**2012–13 1. Liga Promotion**; 6 teams	**2012–13 1. Liga**; 13 teams	**2012-13 2. Liga Interregional**; 10 teams	**2012-13 Regional leagues** 16 teams
FC Basel (BS); Grasshoppers Zürich (ZH); FC Lausanne-Sport (VD); FC Luzern (LU); Servette FC (GE); FC Sion (VS); FC St. Gallen (SG); FC Thun (BE); BSC Young Boys (BE); FC Zürich (ZH)	FC Aarau (AG); AC Bellinzona (TI); FC Biel-Bienne (BE); FC Chiasso (TI); FC Locarno (TI); FC Lugano (TI); FC Wil (SG); FC Winterthur (ZH); FC Wohlen (AG)	SC Brühl (SG); SR Delémont (JU); Étoile Carouge FC (GE); SC Kriens (LU); FC Schaffhausen (SH); FC Tuggen (SZ)	FC Baden (AG); FC Black Stars (BS); SC Cham (ZG); SC Düdingen (FR); FC Echallens (VD); FC Grenchen (SO); FC Köniz (BE); FC Le Mont (VD); FC Monthey (VS); SV Muttenz (BL); FC Schötz (LU); FC Wettswil-Bonstetten (ZH); SC Zofingen (AG)	SC Bümpliz 78 (BE); FC Colombier^{†} (NE); FC Eschenbach (LU); FC Hergiswil (NW); FC Ibach (SZ); FC Langenthal (BE); FC La Sarraz-Éclépens (VD); FC Linth 04 (GL); FC Moutier (BE); FC Thierrens (VD)	**Sixth tier**: FC Aarberg (BE); FC Altstetten (ZH); FC Amriswil (TG); FC Arlesheim (BL); FC Ems (GR); FC Hochdorf (LU); CS Italien (GE); FC Olten (SO); Pully Football (VD); FC Richemond (FR); FC Saxon-Sports (VS); FC Schönbühl (BE); AC Vallemaggia (TI); Vedeggio Calcio^{‡} (TI); FC Windisch (AG); **Seventh tier**: FC Diessenhofen^{FP} (TG)

Teams in bold are still active in the competition.

th Title holders.
^{FP} Qualified for having the lowest fair play points inside its regional tier.
^{†} Qualified as regional leagues cup winners before being promoted to 2. Liga Interregional.
^{‡} Qualified through 2. Liga Interregional qualifiers after being relegated to their regional league.

== Round 1 ==
Teams from Super League and Challenge League were seeded in this round. In a match, the home advantage was granted to the team from the lower league, if applicable.

Team 1	Score	Team 2
14 September 2012
FC Le Mont	1–4	FC Biel-Bienne
15 September 2012
FC Olten	0–4	FC Lugano
FC Altstetten	0–7	FC St. Gallen
FC Wettswil-Bonstetten	1–5	BSC Young Boys
FC Arlesheim	1–3	FC Chiasso
FC Köniz	3–1	FC Tuggen
FC Amriswil	1–6	FC Basel
FC Schönbühl	2–1	FC Aarberg
FC Eschenbach	0–1	FC Winterthur
FC Monthey	2–4 (a.e.t.)	SC Brühl
FC Colombier	2–4	FC Hergiswil
SC Düdingen	3–4	FC Thun
FC Hochdorf	0–4	FC Lausanne-Sport
FC Thierrens	2–3	FC Locarno
FC Saxon-Sports	2–3 (a.e.t.)	FC La Sarraz-Éclépens
SC Zofingen	1–3 (a.e.t.)	FC Schötz
FC Langenthal	1–3	SC Kriens
FC Moutier	0–4	FC Grenchen
CS Italien	1–5	FC Schaffhausen
FC Ibach	1–2 (a.e.t.)	FC Black Stars
AC Vallemaggia	3–1 (a.e.t.)	SC Bümpliz 78
FC Diessenhofen	0–5	FC Baden
Étoile Carouge FC	1–1 (a.e.t.) (p. 4–5)	FC Wohlen
16 September 2012
SC Cham	2–1	Servette FC
SR Delémont	1–1 (a.e.t.) (p. 6–5)	FC Luzern
Vedeggio Calcio	0–5	Grasshoppers Zürich
FC Ems	0–5	AC Bellinzona
FC Echallens	0–6	FC Zürich
FC Windisch	0–7	FC Wil
FC Richemond	0–1	FC Sion
Pully Football	1–4	FC Aarau
FC Linth 04	2–3	SV Muttenz

== Round 2 ==
The winners of Round 1 played in this round. Teams from Super League were seeded, the home advantage was granted to the team from the lower league, if applicable.

Team 1	Score	Team 2
10 November 2012
FC Schönbühl	0–4	SC Kriens
FC Black Stars	1–3	FC Zürich
AC Vallemaggia	0–6	Grasshoppers Zürich
FC Köniz	2–2 (a.e.t.) (p. 4–2)	FC Winterthur
FC Schötz	1–4	FC Wil
FC Baden	0–5	FC Schaffhausen
FC Lugano	0–2	FC Thun
11 November 2012
FC Grenchen	0–4	FC Wohlen
FC Hergiswil	0–3	FC Sion
FC Biel-Bienne	0–3	FC St. Gallen
SV Muttenz	1–5	BSC Young Boys
FC Chiasso	1–4	FC Basel
FC Aarau	2–0	AC Bellinzona
FC La Sarraz-Éclépens	0–3	SC Brühl
SC Cham	2–2 (a.e.t.) (p. 4–5)	FC Locarno
SR Delémont	0–4	FC Lausanne-Sport

== Round 3 ==
The winners of Round 2 played in this round, the home advantage was granted to the team from the lower league, if applicable.

Team 1	Score	Team 2
8 December 2012
SC Brühl	1–3	FC Lausanne-Sport
FC Schaffhausen	1–1 (a.e.t.) (p. 2–3)	Grasshoppers Zürich
9 December 2012
FC Köniz	1–5	FC Zürich
FC Wil	4–3	BSC Young Boys
FC Locarno	2–3 (a.e.t.)	FC Basel
3 February 2013
FC Wohlen	1–2	FC Thun
SC Kriens	0–4	FC Sion
FC Aarau	2–0 (a.e.t.)	FC St. Gallen

== Quarter-finals ==
The winners of Round 3 played in the Quarter-finals, there was no home advantage granted in the draw.

27 February 2013
19:30

FC Wil	2 – 4 (a.e.t.)	FC Zürich
Muslin 29'; Audino 96'		Gavranović 5'; Gajić 93'; Drmić 114'; Schönbächler 120'

AFG Arena, St. Gallen
Attendance: 2,950
Referee: Sascha Amhof

27 February 2013
19:45

FC Thun	1 – 2 (a.e.t.)	FC Basel
Schneuwly 79'		A. Frei 12', 115'

Arena Thun, Thun
Attendance: 3,664
Referee: Alain Bieri

27 February 2013
20:15

FC Aarau	1 – 4	Grasshoppers Zürich
Ioniţă 66'	Report	Feltscher 16', 74'; Zuber 89'; Ngamukol 90'

Stadion Brügglifeld, Aarau
Attendance: 6,600
Referee: Stephan Studer

27 February 2013
20:30

FC Lausanne-Sport	0 – 2	FC Sion
		Vanczák 28'; N'Djeng 90+4' (pen.)

Stade Olympique de la Pontaise, Lausanne
Attendance: 4,000
Referee: Adrien Jaccottet

== Semi-finals ==
The winners of the Quarter-finals stage advanced to play in the Semi-finals.

17 April 2013
19:00

FC Zürich	1 − 2 (a.e.t.)	Grasshoppers Zürich
Benito 23'		Feltscher 39'; Hajrović 94'

Letzigrund, Zürich
Attendance: 20,507
Referee: Alain Bieri

17 April 2013
20:45

FC Sion	0 − 1	FC Basel
	(FCB Report) (in German)	Stocker 73' (pen.)

Stade Tourbillon, Sion
Attendance: 13,800
Referee: Nikolaj Hänni

== Final ==
The winners of the Semi-finals stage played in the Final, which was held in the capital at the Stade de Suisse, Wankdorf.

20 May 2013
16:00

FC Basel	1 – 1 (a.e.t.)	Grasshoppers Zürich
Schär (yellow card) 28'; Dragović (yellow card) 57'; Steinhöfer 71'; Elneny (yellow card) 91'	SFV summary FCB summary	(yellow card) 29' Gashi; 75' Hajrović
Penalties
Schär (penalty scored); F. Frei (penalty missed); Steinhöfer (penalty scored); Díaz (penalty scored); Bobadilla (penalty missed)	3 – 4	(penalty scored) Salatić; (penalty scored) Hajrović; (penalty missed) Lang; (penalty scored) Feltscher; (penalty scored) Vilotić

Stade de Suisse, Wankdorf, Bern
Attendance: 27,290
Referee: Stephan Studer

GK	(Switzerland) Yann Sommer
DF	(Switzerland) Kay Voser		(substituted off) 60'
DF	(Switzerland) Fabian Schär	(yellow card) 28'
DF	(Austria) Aleksandar Dragović	(yellow card) 57'
DF	(South Korea) Park Joo-Ho
MF	(Switzerland) Fabian Frei
MF	(Chile) Marcelo Díaz
MF	(Egypt) Mohamed Elneny	(yellow card) 91'
MF	(Ivory Coast) Serey Die		(substituted off) 106'
MF	(Switzerland) Valentin Stocker
ST	(Switzerland) Marco Streller (c)		(substituted off) 69'
Substitutes:
DF	(Germany) Markus Steinhöfer		(substituted on) 60'
MF	(Argentina) Raúl Bobadilla		(substituted on) 69'
FW	(Switzerland) David Degen		(substituted on) 106'
Manager:
(Switzerland) Murat Yakin

GK	(Switzerland) Roman Bürki
DF	(Switzerland) Michael Lang
DF	(Serbia) Milan Vilotić
DF	(Switzerland) Stéphane Grichting
DF	(Austria) Moritz Bauer
MF	(Albania) Amir Abrashi		(substituted off) 95'
MF	(Switzerland) Vero Salatić
MF	(Bosnia and Herzegovina) Izet Hajrović
MF	(Albania) Shkëlzen Gashi	(yellow card) 29'	(substituted off) 100'
MF	(Switzerland) Steven Zuber		(substituted off) 66'
ST	(France) Anatole Ngamukol
Substitutes:
MF	(Venezuela) Frank Feltscher		(substituted on) 66'
MF	(Democratic Republic of the Congo) Nzuzi Toko		(substituted on) 95'
MF	(Switzerland) Nassim Ben Khalifa		(substituted on) 100'
Manager:
(Switzerland) Uli Forte
