= 2012–13 FC Basel season =

FC Basel
2012–13 season
- Chairman: Bernhard Heusler
- Manager: Heiko Vogel until 15 October 2012; Murat Yakin from 15 October 2012
- Ground: St. Jakob-Park, Basel, Switzerland
- Super League: 1st
- Swiss Cup: Runners-up
- Champions League: Play-off round
- Europa League: Semi-finals
- Top goalscorer: League: Marco Streller (14); All: Marco Streller (21)
- Highest home attendance: Swiss Super League: 35,171 vs. Lausanne (16 May 2013); UEFA Europa League; 36,000 vs. Chelsea (25 April 2013)
- Lowest home attendance: Swiss Super League: 24,265 vs. Sion (9 February 2013); UEFA Europa League; 12,743 vs. Videoton (8 November 2012)
Home colours	Away colours

The 2012–13 FC Basel season is the 120th season in club history and the club's 18th consecutive season in the top flight of Swiss football. Basel started their season with various warm-up matches against teams from Switzerland, Romania and Germany. Their 2012–13 Swiss Super League season began on 13 July with the away tie against Servette FC and they started in the 2012–13 Swiss Cup first round on 15 September with the away game against FC Amriswil. Basel entered the Champions League in the qualifying phase and were drawn against Estonian club Flora Tallinn. This and the following qualifying round were successfully negotiated, however in the play-off round Basel lost both games against CFR Cluj and were knocked out.

Following a poor start to the season it was announced on 15 October 2012 that Vogel had been replaced by Murat Yakin as manager. Following their exit from the Champions League, Basel played in the Europa League group stage and were drawn into Group G along with Sporting Clube de Portugal, K.R.C. Genk and Videoton FC. They finished the Group in second position and advanced to the knockout phase round of 32. Here they were drawn against the Ukrainian Premier League team Dnipro Dnipropetrovsk. Basel won 3–1 on aggregate. In the round of 16 they were drawn against Zenit St. Petersburg and, despite being the underdogs, Basel advanced by winning 2–1 on aggregate. Thus they qualified for the quarter-finals and were drawn against Tottenham Hotspur, whom they beat 4–1 on penalties after a 4–4 aggregate draw to progress to the semi-finals. The draw for the semi-final matched Basel against the reigning UEFA Champions League holders Chelsea.

== Club ==
=== FC Basel Holding AG ===
The FC Basel Holding AG (Holding) owns 75% of the club FC Basel (FC Basel 1893 AG) and the other 25% is owned by the club and its members. Chairman of the Holding was Bernhard Heusler, the finance chief was Stephan Werthmüller and Sportdirector was Georg Heitz. As chairman of the Holding Heusler was also chairman of the club.

=== Club management ===
At the AGM the existing board of directors under president Bernhard Heusler with vice-president Adrian Knup, sportdirector Georg Heitz, financial manager Stephan Werthmüller and marketing manager René Kamm, and the three directors Reto Baumgartner, Dominik Donzé and Benno Kaiser were willing to continue as before. They were all re-elected unanimously

Chairman	(Switzerland) Mr Bernhard Heusler
Vice Chairman	(Switzerland) Mr Adrian Knup
Finances	(Switzerland) Mr Stephan Werthmüller
Sportdirector	(Switzerland) Mr Georg Heitz
Marketing	(Switzerland) Mr René Kamm
Director	(Switzerland) Mr Reto Baumgartner
Director	(Switzerland) Mr Dominik Donzé
Director	(Switzerland) Mr Benno Kaiser
Ground (capacity and dimensions)	St. Jakob-Park (38,512; 37,500 for international matches / 120x80 m)

Updated to match played 1 July 2013
Source: FCB Official Site

=== Team management ===
First team manager at the start on the season was Heiko Vogel. His assistants were Marco Walker and Markus Hoffmann. Massimo Colomba retired as a player and was appointed as the new Goalkeeper coach. Massimo Ceccaroni was appointed as the new head of the FCB Youth System. Coach of the Youth Team (U–21) was Carlos Bernegger and Benjamin Huggel, who also retired as player, was appointed as his new assistant.

On 15 October 2012 it was announced that Vogel had been replaced by Murat Yakin as manager, but that the assistants would all remain in their respective positions. On 7 April 2013 it was announced that Carlos Bernegger was released from his still running contract (that was valid until June 2015) so that he could sign a contract with FC Luzern as first team manager. Bernegger started his new job on 8 April and was replaced ad-interim by the Youth Section boss Ceccaroni.

Position	Staff
Manager	(Switzerland) Heiko Vogel until 15 October 2012
Manager	(Switzerland) Murat Yakin from 15 October 2012
1 Assistant manager	(Switzerland) Marco Walker
2 Assistant manager	(Austria) Markus Hoffmann
Goalkeeper Coach	(Switzerland) Massimo Colomba
Team Administration	(Switzerland) Gustav Nussbaumer
Youth Team Coach	(Switzerland) Carlos Bernegger until 7 April 2013
Youth Team Coach ad-interim	(Switzerland) Massimo Ceccaroni from 8 April 2013
Youth Team Co-Coach	(Switzerland) Benjamin Huggel

Last updated: 1 July 2012
Source: FCB Official Site

== Overview ==
=== Offseason and preseason ===
Heiko Vogel remained as first team manager. A number of players left the squad. Massimo Colomba retired as a player and was appointed as the new Goalkeeper coach.

Beni Huggel also retired from his active career and became assistant to coach Carlos Bernegger of the U-21 team. Between the years 1998 to 2005 and again from 2007 to 2012 Huggel played a total of 536 games for Basel scoring a total of 102 goals. 297 of these games were in the Swiss Super League, 30 in the Swiss Cup, 74 in the European competitions (Champions League, Europa League and UIC) and 135 were friendly games. He scored 62 goals in the domestic league, 9 in the cup, 8 in the European competitions and the other 23 were scored during the test games. Huggel won the Swiss championship seven times and the cup five times.

Further, Scott Chipperfield retired from his professional career and moved to local amateur club FC Aesch as player-coach. Between the years 2001 and 2012 Chipperfield played a total of 486 games for the club scoring 106 times. 270 of these games were in the domestic league, 37 in the Cup, 78 in the European competitions and 101 were friendly games. He scored 69 goals in the domestic league, 8 in the cup, 8 in the European competitions and the other 21 were netted during the test games. He is the Basel all-time record holder of titles with the club, with seven Swiss Nationalliga A/Super League and six Swiss Cup honours.

Xherdan Shaqiri left the club and signed a four-year contract with Bayern Munich. The transfer fee was not disclosed by the two clubs. Granit Xhaka also left FC Basel and signed a five-year contract with Borussia Mönchengladbach. The clubs did not disclose the transfer fee. It was also announced that Getafe signed David Abraham in a free transfer and gave him a four-year contract.

Basel's biggest signings of the 2012–13 season were Mohamed Salah, who transferred in from Arab Contractors, and Marcelo Díaz, who came from Universidad de Chile. Díaz was transferred to Basel in a US$4 million deal and signed a four-year contract. David Degen also returned to his home club after spending four seasons with BSC Young Boys. Stjepan Vuleta, Simon Grether and Mirko Salvi signed from the youth academy.

=== Winter break ===
Basel started the preparation for the second half of the season on 4 January 2013. They played a friendly on 12 January against Bayern Munich and spent their training camp in Marbella from 14 to 24 January. Here they played four trials, the last being the 2–1 win against the Chinese national team.

On 13 December 2012 FC Basel announced that they had signed Serey Die on a three-and-a-half-year contract and on 17 December 2012 they also announced that Endogan Adili had also been signed on a three-and-a-half-year contract, with an additional one-year option. On 3 January 2013 it was announced that Raúl Bobadilla had been signed on a contract until 2017. On 29 January 2013 it was announced that Basel had signed Mohamed Elneny on loan until the end of the season.

In the other direction, it was also announced that Radoslav Kováč was given a free transfer to Slovan Liberec. During January it was also announced that some of the youngsters would be loaned out to lower league clubs, Pak Kwang-Ryong Simon Grether and Pascal Schürpf to Bellinzona, Stjepan Vuleta to Wil and Marco Aratore to Winterthur so that they could all gain playing experience.

== The campaign ==
=== Domestic league ===
Basel's priority aim for the season is to win the league championship for the fourth time in a row. Basel's 2012–13 Swiss Super League season began on 13 July 2012 with the away tie against Servette FC. The season started poorly, Basel won just three of their first nine games, drawing five with one defeat. They were in fourth position in the league table, eight points behind the leaders Grasshoppers, this even increased to eleven points just three weeks later. Following a poor start to the season the club announced on 15 October 2012 that Vogel had been replaced by Murat Yakin as manager and following the change, the team spirits improved and they played better, achieving the results. FCB ended the first half of the season in second position, they had reduced the arrears to four points and had moved one point ahead of Sion and St. Gallen.

In the second half of the season FC Sion lost their momentum completely and St. Gallen also lost contact to the first two positions in the league table. The Grasshoppers and Basel distanced themselves continually, but remained within a few points of each other. Basel took over the lead in the championship table and, mid-way through the second half of the season, started to open a gap to their last remaining rivals. Despite Grasshoppers winning the direct league fixture against Basel three games before the end of the season, Basel had acquired enough points to finish three points ahead of them and to win their fourth title in a row. Basel thus achieved their main aim that they had set for the season, in fact the league campaign can be described as being a successful one.

Conclusion

Basel thus achieved their main aim that they had set for the season, in fact the league campaign can be described as being a successful one. The team ended the season with 61 goals scored and 31 goals against. They had the season's best attacking as well as the best defensive record. Marco Streller was the team's top goal scorer with 14 goals and he was second in the league top scorer ranking behind Ezequiel Scarione from St. Gallen. Alexander Frei was the team's second-best scorer with seven goals, but the due to injuries he only played in 18 of the league 36 games. Valentin Stocker had scored six league goals and Mohamed Salah had netted five.

=== Domestic Cup ===
Basel entered the 2012–13 Swiss Cup in the first round of the competition and as cup holders the club's clear aim for the team was for them to retain the title. In the first round, teams from the Super League and Challenge League were seeded and could not play against each other. In a match, the home advantage was granted to the team from the lower league, if applicable. Basel were drawn with the away game against FC Amriswil, a team from the OFV (Ostschweizer Fussballverband) eastern regional 2. Liga, the sixth tier of Swiss football.

Amriswil (15 September 2012)

Over 5,000 spectators wanted to see how the amateurs from Amriswil would make life difficult for the reigning Swiss champions Basel. But that didn't happen. By the interval it was already 0–4 out of the hosts point of view. Twice a goal from Jacques Zoua and as well as a goal from Fabian Frei and one from Alex Frei had taken the score to this intermediate and had given FCB a nerve-sparing afternoon. Even the consolation goal in the 74th minute could not spoil the visitor's day, because afterwards again Alex Frei and finally Mohamed Salah subsequently increased the score. The Underdogs lost the match against the favourites 1–6.

Chiasso (11 November 2012)

In the second round of the Cup the teams from the Super League were seeded and could not play each other. In the matches the home advantage was granted to the team from the lower league. Basel were drawn against Chiasso, who at that time played in the Challenge League, the second tier of Swiss football. After two days of continuous rain, the Stadio Comunale with just 1,004 paying spectators and with a soggy and deep pitch welcomed the visitors. But the FCB players were ready and without any lead time. Gilles Yapi, who wore the captain's armband because Marco Streller was out injured, launched Mohamed Salah with a long ball and his ideally timed cross found the completely free-standing Fabian Frei at the far post. The Basel team quickly followed up and increased their early lead in the 19th minute to 2–0 with a header from Jacques Zoua after a corner from Marcelo Diaz. The consolation goal sprang from a Basel corner kick, which was played shortly. Yapi's shot was blocked and the home team conjured up a perfectly played counterattack. Captain Sandro Reclari sent Luis Filipe Pimenta running with a long ball. The Portuguese sprinted from the centre line, out-running defender Joo Ho Park, and artfully lifted the ball from 15 meters over Germano Vailati into the goal. After the break, an FCB, who was vastly superior in all respects, nailed the opponent to his penalty area. Salah and twice Diaz still missed good chances, but then with a double strike in the 65th and 67th minute the match was decided. First Salah played Fabian Frei into space, keeper Andrea Capelletti could not hold his shot, and Zoua rounded the Chiasso goalie and pushed home from an acute angle. The fourth goal was initiated by Marcelo Diaz with a pass to Salah. The Egyptian saw his shot blocked, but Diaz inherited the ricochet and shot in from ten yards. The 4–1 score line remained until the final whistle.

Locarno (9 December 2012)

In the third round, the ties were drawn, there was no seeding, everyone could meet everyone. The home advantage was granted to the team from the lower league, otherwise to the team that was drawn first. Basel were drawn, again away from home, against Locarno. Basel took control of the game from the beginning. In the fifth minute corner for Basel, Jacques Zoua heads the ball, goalie Mitrović landed in the goal, but held the ball on the line. Eighth minute a cross from Alexander Frei and Mohamed Salah kicked the ball into the net. The goal was disallowed because the ball had passed over the line before the cross had been made. Basel were completely in control of the game, but Salah, Frei, Zoua and Fabian Schär missed their chances. Shortly before the interval Salah eventually got his goal, sent into the middle on a sprint with a long ball, he used the outside of his left boot to put the ball home. In the second period Nicolás Mazzola on 51 minutes levelled the score and double strike just four minutes later put the home team in front. Salah also managed a double pack, in the 75th minute he levelled the score. Basel should have decided the tie with their numerous chances earlier, but extra time was needed to decide the tie. Valentin Stocker did this by scoring the winner in the 117th minute. Locarno were knocked out by Basel, 2–3 being the final score.

Thun (27 February 2013)

The winners of Round 3 played in the quarter-finals and these were played in the new year. The ties were drawn, there is no home advantage granted in the draw. Basel were drawn away from home against FC Thun. Head coach Murat Yakin had changed the team significantly compared to their last game Six players were left out, Schär, Park, Cabral, Stocker and Streller were given a day off, Fabian Frei and Salah initially sat on the bench. Less than twelve minutes had passed in the Arena Thun, which was almost embarrassingly empty for a Cup quarter-final, when Alexander Frei was present for the first FCB chance. Newcomer Mohamed Elneny launched Philipp Degen with a great ball and as his cross came Frei cleverly ran free to head home. Basel controlled the game, created chances but did not succeed to add a goal. In the second period they limited themselves to managing the result and promptly they conceded the equalizer in the 79th minute. After a corner kick, Mathieu Salamand, who had just been substituted in seconds before, was able to bring the ball to the middle, where FCB goalie Yann Sommer did not react and Marco Schneuwly was able to nod home from four meters out. After this shock, Basel pulled themselves together, found their way back into the game and in the extra time they dominated. Salah missed a first big chance in the 93rd minute when he sprinted with the ball past the Thun goalkeeper, but then also past the goal. FCB had to bite until the 115th minute, before they scored the second, decisive goal. Initiated nicely by Marcelo Diaz and processed even better by Fabian Frei down the right wing, Alex Frei scored with a direct volley from five meters.

Sion (17 April 2013)

Basel's opponents in the semi-final were FC Sion. The match was played in front of an attendance of 13,800 fans which meant that the Stade Tourbillon was virtually sold out. Both teams started on eye level with each other and chances were rare happenings. In the 50th minute Marco Streller ran onto a long ball played by Mohamed Elneny to the far side of the far post, goalkeeper Andris Vaņins and defender Vilmos Vanczák both went to challenge him, but broke off their runs because they thought the ball would go out. However, Streller got his boot to the ball before it crossed the outline, passed it to Valentin Stocker whose angled shot missed the target by a hair's width. On 64 minutes a long pass to Sion's striker Michael Dingsdag, but his first-time volley in the sprint from outside the box was saved by Yann Sommer at full stretch. Stocker scored the decisive 1–0 after a cross from Streller a quarter of an hour before the end. Basel achieved the first ever win against Sion in the Cup.

Grasshopper Club (20 May 2013)

The cup final was held on Whit Monday in the Stade de Suisse, Wankdorf with referee Stéphan Studer and with an attendance of 27,290 fans. Both teams started on eye level with each other, playing hard but not unfair. Chances out of the game were hardly possible, but standard situations brought danger. A free-kick for GC in the 38th minute was the first big chance, Steven Zuber’s long ball was side footed at goal by Milan Vilotić, but Yann Sommer stretched and saved brilliantly. GC controlled the game before the interval, a long ball and Shkëlzen Gashi ran into the open space, but he put the ball wide of the far post. After the break a yellow card, that could also have been a red, for Basel defender Aleksandar Dragović, another free-kick for Zuber and this time it was the cross-bar that denied Vilotić the opener. In the 69th minute FCB captain Streller is substituted out because of an injury and new striker Raúl Bobadilla was brought in. Two minutes later he out dribbled two defenders but fell and as he fell Markus Steinhöfer took over the ball and shot at goal and FCB took the lead. GC reacted immediately a shot from Michael Lang was blocked by Sommer, but Izet Hajrović put the loose ball over the goal line. Extra time was required and both teams could have scored, but Nassim Ben Khalifa at one end and Bobadilla at the other failed. Penalty shoot-out. With four penalties taken things were level 3–3. Last penalty for Basel, Bobadilla hit – the crossbar instead of the goal, then Milan Vilotic hit the goal – instead of the crossbar – and it was all over. The Grasshoppers were cup winners.

Conclusion

As cup holders the club's clear aim for the team was for them to retain the title. They had completed their aim of reaching the final, but the penalty shoot-out had denied the absolute fulfilment. Alex Frei was the team's top scorer in the competition with five goals in the games. Jacques Zoua had scored four in four outings and Mohamed Salah had scored three in five outings.

=== Champions League ===
Because Basel entered the Champions League in the qualifying phase their initial aim was to reach the group stage.

Flora Tallinn (17 July 2012)

Basel were drawn against Estonian club Flora Tallinn in the second qualifying round. The first leg was played in the A. Le Coq Arena in Tallinn in front of 3.123 fans. It was a partially cloudy evening, the temperature was by 19 °C and the pitch was dry. Basel started well into the match and took control of the game and had more possession than the Estonian champions. However, the best chance in the early stages came from the hosts, but Karl-Eerik Luigend's good cross was shot over the cross-bar by Karl Mööl. Alex Frei had his first chance a few minutes later, but his close-range shot was well saved by Stanislav Pedõk. In the second period Frei first struck on 64 minutes, as he applied the finishing touch to a right-wing cross from David Degen. He then added another three minutes before the final whistle, from a spot-kick, after Karl Palatu had fouled Valentin Stocker.

Return match (24 July 2012)

The second leg was played in the St. Jakob-Park in front of 20,467 fans. Referee Artur Soares Dias from the Portuguese Football Federation reported a dry and good pitch, it was sunny and warm 29 °C evening. Basel started well and with tempo, the visitors struggled to impose themselves on the game. Basel missed their first good chance, but on 9 minutes Jacques Zoua was able to put them one up. Markus Steinhöfer played David Degen free on the right flank and his good cross to the centre was headed home by a free standing Zoua. With Marcelo Díaz distributing the balls in midfield, Basel continued to play forwards and were seeing no danger to their rear, goalie Germano Vailati had a quiet evening. On 31 minutes after a neat move and a one-two with captain Marco Streller, Zoua managed his second goal of the evening. The visitors never really got into the game and went further behind on 63 minutes. A long distance free-kick was smashed home directly by mid-fielder Díaz to make it 3–0, which remained until the final whistle.

Molde (1 August 2012)

Basel were drawn against Norwegian club Molde FK in the third qualifying round. The first leg was in the Aker Stadion with an attendance of 6,564 fans. Basel's head coach Heiko Vogel had to adapt his team, because striker Alex Frei was injured, Basel played with a five-man midfield. Nevertheless, they started well and were quick to take ball possession against the Norwegian champions. In the 10th minute a long opening ball from Goalie Sommer and captain Marco Streller headed on to Valentin Stocker who out-dribbled two defenders, but put the ball wide of the far post. On 15 minutes Marcelo Díaz hammered a direct free-kick at goal, but keeper Espen Bugge Pettersen stretched and was able to push the ball wide. Molde coach Ole Gunnar Solskjær saw his side have their first big chance moments later, Angan was sent down the right by a long ball but his superb volley was well saved by Yann Sommer. A few minutes later Angan struck his hand in Aleksandar Dragović's face and was shown a straight red card by referee Fredy Fautrel of the French Football Federation. The hosts then found themselves back pedalling as Basel took charge. In the second half Basel found it hard to create goal chances against the tightly sorted defence and when they did, their efforts didn't pay dividends. But then on 78 minutes Stocker received the ball, dummied the defender and hit a precise shot towards goal, keeper Pettersen parried the ball and Jacques Zoua sprinted in to kick the loose ball over the line. The 1–0 scoreline remained until the end.

Return match (8 August 2012)

The second leg was in the St. Jakob-Park and on this sunny evening the attendance was 18,567 fans. In the early stages the visitors showed their intentions and pinned Basel back into their own half. Molde FK created their first good chance on 9 minutes as Jo Inge Berget played a quick one-two playing Mattias Moström clear in the box, but Sommer held his shot. A further one-two between Berget and Moström on 14 minutes sent Moström through towards goal but he placed his shot wide of the far post. David Degen had Basel's first good chance on 28 minutes as he ran into position collecting a long ball from Gilles Yapi, but he shot wide. Ole Gunnar Solskjær’s team were rewarded for their superiority in the 32nd minute, a mistake in midfield, a slick move forward and after Magne Simonsen's first shot was parried by Sommer, the rebound fell to Berget who slotted home. After the interval the match changed, Basel found a higher gear and took control. First Valentin Stocker side-footed David Degen's cross off target. Then Degen had a shot blocked in the 63rd minute, he collected the rebound but shot wide. Marcelo Díaz was the next to miss the target and Marco Streller headed over the crossbar. Having spent much of the first period playing forwards, suddenly Molde were happy to sit back and wait for counterattacks. But this was a dangerous tactic, because Basel achieved that goal they were looking for. Diaz with the cross in the 75th minute, Streller headed the ball down for Degen and he pushed it home not savagely but with sense 1–1. But it wasn't finished yet, second minute of added time Gastón Sauro pulled his opponent over inside the penalty area. Referee Vladislav Bezborodov of the Russian Football Union had no choice spot-kick. If it was converted Molde would go through, but Sommer correctly guessed which side, dived to his right and saved from Hoseth. The Norwegian champions were demoted to the UEFA Europa League, Basel advanced to the play-off round.

CFR 1907 Cluj (21 August 2012)

In the play-off round Basel were drawn against the Romanian champions CFR Cluj and the first leg was played in the St. Jakob-Park with an attendance of 16,651 fans. Referee was Jonas Eriksson of the Swedish Football Association. Basel started well, their moves were reasoned and the passes well timed. The visitors, however, created the first good chance, Basel keeper Sommer had to stretch following a fierce 25-metre shot from Modou Sougou. Instantly Basel reacted. Mohamed Salah sprinted down the right wing and his curving cross was met by Marco Streller, but his glanced header went wide. Salah then found David Degen with a good pass, but he fired his shot straight at keeper Mário Felgueiras. Five minutes later again Salah with a cross, this time Valentin Stocker shot wide. CFR had their second chance after about 40 minutes, but Pantelis Kapetanos shot over the top. The goal that Basel had threatened came one minute before the interval. A corner-kick from Marcelo Díaz's was diverted into Streller's path and with an acrobatic volley he hit the ball beyond keeper Felgueiras. The second period began as the first half did, Basel took the initiative. Sent down the right by Díaz, David Degen crossed for Stocker, whose short-range firm header was punched out by Felgueiras who reacted fast. However, the home team were caught shortly after the hour, Rafael Bastos’s through ball to Sougou was well timed and his right-foot finish landed low in the net. Five minutes later Gabriel Mureșan sent Sougou running free again and this time he lashed his shot into the roof of the net to put Basel 1–2 down. Basel could not react and the score line remained until the end.

Return match (29 August 2012)

The second leg was played at Stadionul Dr. Constantin Rădulescu with an attendance of 15,481 fans. FCB needed to score twice as a minimum requirement and this was not helped by the fact that head coach Heiko Vogel had to replace midfielder Mohamed Salah because of injury. Nevertheless, the experienced duo Marco Streller and Alexander Frei were always a danger for the host's defence. Frei had the first good chance, but his curling shot floated over the bar. CFR had no intention of sitting back, despite conceding the majority of possession, they were always dangerous with counter-attacks and in the 20th minute a quick counter was finished off by Pantelis Kapetanos header from Diogo Valente’s cross. Basel reacted and took the initiative. Shortly before the interval, advancing goalie Mário Felgueiras brought down Streller and referee Gianluca Rocchi from Italy was forced to award a penalty. But Frei hit the spot-kick over the top. In the second period FCB refused to surrender, but despite all their hard work, they struggled to create clear chances. Substitute Cabral came closest with a 20-metre strike, but at full stretch the home goalkeeper pushed the ball round the post. Later following a corner, defender Aleksandar Dragovic narrowly missed the target with his header. CFR held their 1–0 lead to win 3–1 on aggregate.

Conclusion

Basel entered the 2012–13 UEFA Champions League in the qualifying phase and therefore their initial aim was to reach the group stage. Having lost both games against CFR Cluj and being knocked out 3–1 on aggregate the initial aim failed.

=== Europa League ===
Because the losing teams from the Champions League play-off round were eligible for the group stage of the Europa League, Basels next aim was to remain in this European competition over the winter break. The draw for the group stage was held on 31 August 2012, 13:00 CEST, at Grimaldi Forum in Monaco. FCB was seeded into pot two and drawn into Group G along with Sporting Clube de Portugal, K.R.C. Genk and Videoton FC.

==== Group stage ====
Sporting CP (29 August 2012)

Matchday 1 gave FCB an away game at Estádio José Alvalade in Lisbon against Sporting CP. Sporting had been placed in third position in the 2011–12 Primeira Liga, but this season they started badly into the domestic league and were fifth-last in the table. Although the two teams had met against each other four times in less than five years, this evening did not follow the pattern of recent meetings. Sporting had won all four previous meetings without conceding a single goal, but they entered into this game quite slowly. Basel started better. On 22 minutes a long diagonal free-kick from Alex Frei found Aleksandar Dragovic who ran in unnoticed at the far post with precision timing but he headed the ball inches wide. Ricky van Wolfswinkel was in his typically lively mood and just before the interval he almost put Sporting in front as he connected to André Carrillo's perfect pass and he hit a fierce shot at goal, but Sommer held the ball well. After the goalless first period, Xandão was shown a direct red card in the 50th-minute. Sporting stood back, but compact in the defensive area. On 55 minutes a thunderous drive from Marcelo Díaz some 40 metres out skimmed off the crossbar with captain and goalkeeper Rui Patrício beaten. Striker Van Wolfswinkel was an increasingly isolated figure, but with 15 minutes left he controlled the ball skilfully with his chest, however, his shot was not good enough to bother goalie Sommer. Ten-man Sporting CP held onto a 0–0 draw against FC Basel 1893.

Genk CP (4 October 2012)

Matchday 2 was played in the St. Jakob-Park against Genk on a wet pitch, on a cloudy early evening, in front of 14,023 supporters. The first period belonged completely to the visitors, apart from one opportunist effort from Valentin Stocker. Genk's opening goal was somewhat lucky, Benjamin De Ceulaer hit a pass between the defenders for Jelle Vossen who slid in with his boot stretched out, goalie Sommer rushed out to block the shot, but Vossen could not connect to the ball, which then slid beyond both of them and rolled into the goal. After half an hour De Ceulaer almost added a second with a good shot, but was denied. He then returned to his role as play-maker and with a stylish back-heel he set up Vossen who finished off from the middle of the penalty area just before the break. Seconds later, Alexander Frei should have pulled one back with a point-blank header, but it wasn't his lucky day and the visitors led by two goals as the whistle for half-time came. After the break Basel pressed forward trying to get back into the game, but lacked creative chances. Then 20 minutes from the end, as time and ideas were running out, Kalidou Koulibaly was judged by referee Bülent Yıldırım of the Turkish Football Federation to have lifted his foot too high in the penalty area against midfielder Stocker, who might well have taken on the ball with his arm. Nevertheless, Yıldırım blew his whistle and awarded Basel the spot-kick, which Streller then converted. Basel were electrified, played a gear higher, and were awarded with the equaliser five minutes from time as Streller headed home a corner kick from Stocker to the end score 2–2. Basel were the better team on the night and deserved the point, but they were lucky that things ended as it did.

Videoton (25 October 2012)

The Sóstói Stadion in Székesfehérvár was the venue for matchday 3 in which Videoton were hosts to FC Basel 1983 in front of 8,500 spectators. Not even two minutes had been played as the visitors fell behind. Videoton's right-back Álvaro Brachi's made a cross to the near-post cross, midfielder Nemanja Nikolić put Basel's defender Fabian Schär under pressure and he unintentionally deflected the ball into his own net. Basel were shocked, but they put themselves together and showed first reactions. On 11 minutes Marcelo Díaz played a free-kick to the far post and the unmarked Marco Streller forced goalie Mladen Božović to make a good save. Minutes later he controlled a poor clearance with his chest and shot left footed fiercely but wide. In the 32nd minute Videoton played a corner-kick short and low, Nikolić played the ball diagonally into the goal area, the Basel defence stood and watched as Marco Caneira moved in to put the ball into the net from short distance. The visitors pulled themselves together again and dominated play. A cross from the right was punched away by the host's goalie Božović, but only to Schär, however his first-time volley went inches wide. The host's goalie stayed alert and denied Valentin Stocker's sharp back-heel effort and then denied Streller yet again. After the break the same methods of play, Basel had the bigger share of possession and dominated, Videoton stood back and waited for counter-attacks. Streller failed to beat Božović after a through ball from Valentin Stocker and failed to beat him again after a corner. Basel's 15th corner in the 91st minute eventually brought the consolation goal, Schär jumped highest to head Fabian Frei's kick into the top corner. The Videoton defence held tight in the final few hectic moments for the 2–1 home win.

Videoton (8 November 2012)

The requirements were clear as it came to matchday 4 in the St. Jakob-Park. Genk were group leaders with seven points, Videoton second with six, Basel had just two and with another defeat they would be out. As referee Yevhen Aranovskiy of the Football Federation of Ukraine blew the whistle for Kick-off the temperature had fallen to just 6 °C and this was probably the reason why only 12,743 spectators were present in the St. Jakob-Park. The home team dominated the first period and only their keeper Mladen Božović kept Videoton in the game before the break. The keeper twice foiled Alexander Frei from close range, first he parried a header following Philipp Degen's cross and later he blocked an instinctive effort after a Streller knock-down. Božović best save of the evening was in the 22nd minute as he turned Streller's point-blank header away with a strong right hand. After the restart Paulo Sousa's team focused with their defensive tactics on suffocating the Basel attacking efforts. Streller rounded Paulo Vinícius, but sliced wide as he created himself a rare opportunity. Murat Yakin's team remained concentrated and patient and the Basel captain made no mistake when the next chance came his way. Streller controlled Mohamed Salah's pass, resisted the defenders and crashed his effort inside the left post from the edge of the box. This 1–0 was decisive, it lifted Basel to within a point of Videoton and just a win adrift of leaders Genk, who drew 1–1 with Sporting in the other game.

Sporting (22 November 2012)

Referee Paolo Valeri of the Italian Football Federation was in charge of the matchday 5 tie between Basel and Sporting CP in the St. Jakob-Park with an attendance of 15,666 spectators. Basel made a lively start. David Degen's fierce drive in the 10th minute forced the first notable save from Rui Patrício. On 22 minutes Valentin Stocker played a neat pass into the box, Alexander Frei and Xandão slid in to contest for the ball and as it broke loose Fabian Schär slotted in from close range. Five minutes later a good distance shot from Marcelo Díaz went very close. Sporting reacted immediately, after a defensive mistake by Schär, Ricky van Wolfswinkel forced Yann Sommer to make an impressive save. At the beginning of the second half Sporting captain Elias shot close, but wide from the edge of the box. Two bookable offences within four minutes by Cabral brought Basel into a numerical disadvantage. Coach Murat Yakin responded by substituting Mohamed Salah in for Alexander Frei. Within two minutes this showed an impact. On 66 minutes Salah made a skilful exchange of passes with Stocker who scored and this gave the team breathing space. Five minutes later a long throw out from keeper Sommer sent Salah sprinting down the left on a counterattack. Salah kept his nerve and played to the middle to David Degen, who scored the third from 12 metres out. This sealed the 3–0 victory for ten-man Basel.

Genk CP (6 December 2012)

Matchday 6, the final round of the group stage, was played in the Cristal Arena against Genk in front of an attendance of 11,974 fans. The temperature had fallen to below freezing point as referee Mark Clattenburg from the Football Association blew the whistle for kick-off and he reported a wet pitch on a cloudy evening. The requirements were clear, Genk were already guaranteed a place in the knockout phase. Basel needed a positive result to advance a victory would take them through above this evening's opponents as table leaders. Murat Yakin's men had more possession and controlled the match from the early stages. Fabian Frei and Marco Streller were in very good form on the day and led their team to attacking play. Frei had the first chance, but was denied from close range. The hosts had their first chance on 30 minutes a pass back from the goal line to the middle was pushed away by diving keeper Yann Sommer before it reached the free standing Glynor Plet. A free-kick from Valentin Stocker on 40 minutes was headed goalwards by Fabian Schär, but goalkeeper László Köteles stretched acrobatically tip the ball over the bar. After the break the match followed the same pattern and after two minutes a cross from the right was knocked by Streller into David Degen's path, but he volleyed wide. On 56 minutes Streller latched onto a through ball, but shot from a very narrow angle struck the left post. However, until final whistle neither team were able to make the finishing touch and the match remained goalless.

Conclusion to group stage

Basel started poorly into the group stage, drawing away against Sporting CP and at home to Genk and then were defeated in Székesfehérvár by Videoton. However, following the management change in October, the team spirits improved and they played better. The two home games against Videoton and against Sporting were ended with victories and lifted the team's spirits even more. The goalless draw to the end of the group stage meant Genk were group winners with 12 points and Basel also advanced to the knock out stage as second placed team with nine points. "And that, even though I took over the team in a difficult phase in the Europa League," said coach Murat Yakin with satisfaction, "that's why I want to congratulate my team." Since the team's first participation in the Champions League in the 2002/03 season, the club has now been over wintered in a European Cup competition for the seventh time. The club hat set the team the aim of remaining in the European competition over the winter break and they achieved their aim positively

==== Knockout phase ====
The knockout phase involved 32 teams: the 24 teams that finished in the top two in each group in the 2012–13 UEFA Europa League group stage and the eight teams that finished in third place in the 2012–13 UEFA Champions League group stage. In the draw for the round of 32, the twelve group winners and the four better third-placed teams from the Champions League group stage were seeded, and the twelve group runners-up and the other four third-placed teams from the Champions League group stage were unseeded. A seeded team is drawn against an unseeded team, with the seeded team hosting the second leg. Teams from the same group or the same association could not be drawn against each other. The draws was held at UEFA headquarters in Nyon. Basel were drawn against group F winners Dnipro Dnipropetrovsk.

Dnipro (14 February 2013)

The first leg was held at the St. Jakob-Park in front of 8,314 fans, which was by far the lowest attendance in their own stadium during the club's entire season. Before kick-off the pitch was green and reported as damp on this cloudy evening. Dnipro began the match with an attacking endeavour that had become familiar from them during the group stage, in which the team had achieved 16 goals. Following a long ball Nikola Kalinić shot off target from short range after just 30 seconds. A few minutes later a free kick for the visitors, referee Svein Oddvar Moen of the Football Association of Norway and his linesman oversaw that five Dnipro players were offside, but Yevhen Konoplyanka misjudged his angles with his final shot. Basel grouped themselves and won control in midfield. A long throw-in was played longer by Marco Streller, but Valentin Stocker was too small in the duel for the header which was cleared too short, Cabral headed at goal from just inside the box, the ball was trapped by Stocker and he stylishly swept it past Jan Laštůvka from six metres out, 23 minutes gone. By this time the snow fall had started. On the half hour Fabian Frei collected a loose ball and took aim, but his effort was held by Laštůvka. On 44 minutes the hosts came out of a horror scene unscathed. Roman Zozulya stretched his leg into the path of a low cross from Konoplyanka at the near post, only for Yann Sommer to block the ball out for a corner. After the break the snow stayed, the pitch turned white and the ball was now orange. The hosts were still in charge, despite the visitors substituting new forwards in. On 14 February nobody could deny it would be Valentin's day. On 67 minutes an exactly placed left-footed corner-kick from Stocker was deflected into the net off the fore head of striker Streller. Dnipro could not react to this and Valentin Stocker had led the hosts to a deserved 2–0 victory.

Return match (21 February 2013)

With temperatures at freezing point 26,501 fans filled the Dnipro Arena in Dnipropetrovsk as referee Deniz Aytekin from the German Football Association blew the whistle for kick-off. Basel started well and as Mohamed Salah sprinted clear on six minutes he could have put the visitors ahead. He lifted the ball over the out rushing Jan Laštůvka, but his effort landed narrowly wide of the far post. Juande Ramos's team improved their game after that, but they could never really threaten their opponent's goal. Roman Zozulya hat a perfect half-volley on the run, but this flew into the side netting. Yevhen Seleznyov had a chance, but he hooked the ball over the goal from short range just before the interval. After the break, following a free-kick, which Yann Sommer had parried, Giuliano’s goalbound effort deflected off Fabian Schär's boot to safety with the keeper beaten. Things suddenly looked bad for Dnipro, because within ten minutes of coming on as substitute Nikola Kalinić was dismissed for putting his hand into Schär's face. 12 minutes later Fabian Frei also saw red because he raised his arm to block a Zozulya shot. Seleznyov converted the subsequent spot-kick on 76 minutes, but he messed up his next chance with only the goalie to beat. Minutes later at the other end Zozulya blocked Valentin Stocker in the penalty area and was penalised, Schär stepped up to beat the goalie with the penalty-kick, a low ball to Laštůvka's left, on 81 minutes. The game ended with this 1–1 draw and Basel advanced to the next round. The team's aims were subsequently revised again and this aim was stated as reaching the quarter-finals.

Zenit (7 March 2013)

Basel started the first leg of their round of 16 match against Zenit St. Petersburg at home in the St. Jakob-Park in front of an attendance of 15,008 fans. The home team started well and with a high tempo, especially Serey Die with a slaloming run, only to be halted by a good smothering save from keeper Vyacheslav Malafeev. Also impressive was Mohamed Salah his full-blooded drive from 15 metres went very close and next he fired a volley also narrowly close, but off-target. Zenit with their experienced line-up found their way into the game. Diving in at the rear post to collect a Nicolas Lombaerts pass, Roman Shirokov came closest to registering an away goal. before the interval. After the break Zenit became more intent, Danny threatened at the start with an effort that was deflected behind. Axel Witsel pass to Hulk laid off for Shirokov, but a big save from Yann Sommer as he rushed out to smother the danger. Basel played patiently, but concentrated, and 12 minutes from time Alexander Frei was substituted in. On 83 minutes a pass from Markus Steinhöfer to the never tiered Salah, dribble, shot, but parried by keeper Vyacheslav Malafeev the loose ball rolled out to Marcelo Díaz who put it home. Salah had another chance on 90 minutes as Malafeev parried a shot from Mohamed Elneny, but Salah hammered the rebound over the bar. In added time again Salah on a solo run down the left wing was brought down by Luís Neto in the penalty area. Referee Daniele Orsato from the Italy had no choice, showed Neto red and awarded a penalty. Alex Frei converted to the 2–0 scoreline and this left the Russian champions with a sizeable task in the second leg.

Return match (14 March 2013)

The second leg of the tie with Zenit was held in the Petrovsky Stadium in Saint Petersburg and attracted an attendance of 19,500 spectators. Both teams started well, but Zenit gave an early indication that they intended to turn the result in their favour. However, on 11 minutes Valentin Stocker had the first chance, but he shot too high. Stocker remained dangerous, but as he went into a duel with Aleksandr Kerzhakov he received an elbow in his face. The Zenit midfielder was shown the yellow card, but Stocker's injury meant he could not continue and he was replaced by Fabian Frei. After half an hour Hulk played a corner-kick from the right to the near post, the ball was flicked on by Nicolas Lombaerts and Axel Witsel headed home. Two bookable offences within three minutes by Marcelo Díaz just before the interval brought Basel into a numerical disadvantage. After the break Basel had the first chance as Mohamed Salah sent Mohamed Elneny through with a good pass. Elneny sprinted in, but the angle was too acute and the ball went into the side netting. Murat Yakin's team played the second period with 10 men under pressure. Danny missed the best chance as he chipped over from three metres out, Vladimir Bystrov's shot bounced back off the post and Hulk's effort from 25 metres went a fraction over the cross-bar. Five minutes from time Park Joo-Ho attempted to make a clearance, but his boot hit Bystrov's leg. Referee Paweł Gil of the Polish Football Association had no choice but to award the penalty kick. Yann Sommer saved Roman Shirokov's 86th-minute spot-kick and this took his team through to the quarter-finals 2–1 on aggregate.

Tottenham Hotspur (4 April 2013)

In the quarter-finals Basel were drawn against Tottenham Hotspur. The first leg was played in the White Hart Lane in London and attracted an attendance of 32,136 fans. Referee was Milorad Mažić of the Football Association of Serbia. Basel started fast and furious, Fabian Schär and Marco Streller both had powerful efforts saved by Spurs keeper Brad Friedel, then Markus Steinhöfer volleyed a fraction over the top. After 24 minutes the hosts lost Aaron Lennon due to an injury. After half an hour the visitors took the lead as Valentin Stocker reacted fastest following Streller's attempt bounced back off a post. Four minutes later Fabian Frei doubled up as he put a diving header into the net low beyond the goalie. Another six minutes later Emmanuel Adebayor pulled one back with a volley from close range following Scott Parker's deflected shot. The second half initially followed a similar pattern and after Mohamed Salah was foiled by the Spurs keeper, Kyle Naughton drew a fine save from Basel keeper Yann Sommer. Tottenham managed to pull level as Gylfi Sigurðsson beat Sommer with a half-volley from 22 yards that took a deflection off defender Schar. Basel worked hard to regain the lead both Salah and Jacques Zoua wasted best chances and Stocker went very close with a direct free-kick. Spurs held on, but in added time Gareth Bale was carried off with an ankle injury that would also keep him out in the second leg.

Return match (11 April 2013)

In the second leg, the St. Jakob-Park with 36,500 spectators was sold out, and the referee was Olegário Benquerença of the Portuguese Football Federation. The rainy weather did not spoil anybody's fun until the 23rd minute as Aleksandar Dragović slipped out on the wet pitch and missed the ball as he attempted to cut off a Vertonghen through ball and this allowed Clint Dempsey to round beyond keeper Yann Sommer and side-foot into the ball into the open goal. The home supporters, however, increased their volume and urged their players on. Park Joo-Ho intercepted a pass, Marco Streller took over and played a simple ball into the path of Salah, he played the ball forwards, but as three defenders came to challenge him, with the outside of his left boot he placed his shot beyond Brad Friedel from 20 metres. The Basel keeper had more to do than his counterpart. Sommer beat away a curling effort from Mousa Dembélé and soon afterwards he held a shot from Emmanuel Adebayor. But as Friedel was called upon four minutes after the restart, he was only able to parry a flick-on from Fabian Schär following a corner-kick and Dragovic stood nearby and finished off from close range, to make amends for his mishap earlier. On 56 minutes following a long free-kick, he had a second chance, as he glanced his header goalward, but it flew narrowly wide. 72nd minute corner, Spurs were heading inwards, but Sommer stretched to push the ball away. On 81 minutes a long ball, out from the centre circle was well controlled and then hammered at goal by Dempsey, the ball was nearly parried by Sommer but it rolled home and levelled things again. Seconds before the final whistle Jan Vertonghen was shown a red card for bringing down Streller as last man and so Spurs went into extra time a man short. The home team were the more adventurous in these 30 minutes with an extra man. Mohamed Elneny had one drive from 25 metres out, which, however, rebounded from the woodwork and Alexander Frei had a number of good chances after coming on as a substitute. It came to the penalty shoot-out, Basel converted their first three attempts and keeper Sommer saved low to his right from Tom Huddlestone and Adebayor fired over the top. Marcelo Díaz hammered the decisive penalty into the net and Basel advanced to the semi-finals.

Chelsea (25 April 2013)

The draw for the semi-finals was held at UEFA headquarters in Nyon on 12 April and Basel were drawn against Chelsea. The first leg was played in the St. Jakob-Park with an attendance of 36,000 fans and was sold out. Both teams started well into the game. Basel were renowned for the early attacking pressure and therefore the Blues were ready. Basel's first corner of the game in the third minute was played short, Mohamed Elneny then crossed to the centre and the ball bounced behind from the cross-bar. Chelseas’ winger Eden Hazard played a pass through behind Park Joo Ho for César Azpilicueta, he sent in a good cross, but Frank Lampard's shot was turned around the post by keeper Yann Sommer. From the corner that followed on 12 minutes the ball dropped beyond Branislav Ivanović and hit Moses in the face before bouncing into the corner of the net and the visitor's somewhat lucky, early lead. Hazard enjoyed two excellent chances, then Ramires sent in an angled shot forcing Sommer to make a one-handed stop. By the interval the hosts’ team had only really tested Petr Čech twice, first after a sharp and deflected free-kick from Fabian Schär that the goalie tipped over the bar, then he also had to pull off a low save from Mohamed Salah. Two minutes after the restart Valentin Stocker's shot, with Čech beaten, bounced back off the foot of the post and only minutes later at the other end Fernando Torres shot left-footed against the woodwork as well. The like-for-like trading of chances continued, Torres was denied by Sommer and then Marcelo Díaz swept his shot over the top from 12 metres out After 86 minutes Azpilicueta's foul on Stocker and referee was Pavel Královec of the Football Association of the Czech Republic rewarded the host a penalty which Schär converted for the equaliser. Entering into added time, Sommer made a miraculous save of captain John Terry's header, but he remained powerless to keep out David Luiz's last-gasp set piece in the fourth minute of added time that secured Chelsea a 2–1 victory.

Return match (2 May 2013)

The second leg was played at Stamford Bridge in London in front of an attendance of 39,403 fans. Both sides started well, but both missed early their chances. Basel's came as early as the first minute, but captain Marco Streller smashed his shot narrowly wide. At the other end Frank Lampard’s effort ricochet from the near post, then David Luiz missed his chance at the far post, another few minutes later Ramires, from close up, was beaten by Yann Sommer’s good reaction. Again at the other end, Mohamed Salah missed an opportunity in the 39th minute, as Petr Čech sprawled to smother it. However, the Egyptian forward threatened again before the break, fed by a good pass from Valentin Stocker, he dominantly hit the ball home. Moving into the second period Chelsea, with a second-half surge, scored three times within a ten-minute spell. First, a ball fell for Lampard, Sommer parried but was not able to hold the shot and Torres could not miss on 50 minutes. Then, double strike two minutes later. Victor Moses with a run down the right, pass to Torres, but his shot was blocked and the loose ball fell to Moses, who scored at the second attempt. Third, In the 59th minute Spurs’ next attack ended as Lampard teed up Luiz, who curled his first-time shot high into the net. Chelsea maintained defensive discipline, as Basel pressed, but Fabian Frei's shot rebounded from the woodwork and after this there were no more big chances. Referee Jonas Eriksson from the Swedish Football Association blew the final whistle and Basel lost the match 1–3 and 2–5 on aggregate, thus Chelsea advanced to the final.

Conclusion

Chelsea thus advanced to the final, where they were matched against Benfica in the Amsterdam Arena and they won 2–1 to lift the trophy. From the Basel point of view, the team advancing to the semi-final and this meant that their aim had not just been met, but successfully surpassed. It was the first time that a Swiss team had advanced so far.

== Players ==
=== First team squad ===
The following is the list of the Basel first team squad. It also includes players that were in the squad the day the season started on 13 July 2012 but subsequently left the club after that date.

As of 1 July 2012

Note: Flags indicate national team as defined under FIFA eligibility rules; some limited exceptions apply. Players may hold more than one non-FIFA nationality.

No.	Pos.	Nation	Player
1	GK	SUI	Yann Sommer
3	DF	KOR	Park Joo-Ho
4	DF	SUI	Philipp Degen
5	DF	SUI	Arlind Ajeti
6	DF	AUT	Aleksandar Dragović
7	MF	SUI	David Degen
8	MF	CIV	Serey Die
9	FW	SUI	Marco Streller (Captain)
10	MF	CIV	Gilles Yapi Yapo
11	MF	SUI	Endogan Adili
13	FW	SUI	Alexander Frei
14	MF	SUI	Valentin Stocker
15	DF	SUI	Kay Voser
16	DF	SUI	Fabian Schär
17	FW	ARG	Raúl Bobadilla

No.	Pos.	Nation	Player
18	GK	SUI	Germano Vailati
19	MF	SUI	Simon Grether
20	MF	SUI	Fabian Frei
21	MF	CHI	Marcelo Díaz
22	FW	EGY	Mohamed Salah
23	GK	SUI	Mirko Salvi
24	MF	SUI	Cabral
25	MF	SUI	Darko Jevtić
26	DF	ARG	Gastón Sauro
27	DF	GER	Markus Steinhöfer
29	DF	CZE	Radoslav Kováč
30	FW	SUI	Stjepan Vuleta
31	FW	CMR	Jacques Zoua
33	MF	EGY	Mohamed Elneny
35	FW	PRK	Pak Kwang-Ryong

=== Out on loan ===
—	FW	SUI	Marco Aratore (at (Switzerland) Aarau which ended 3 August)
—	FW	SUI	Marco Aratore (at (Switzerland) Winterthur from 17 January 2013 until 30 June 2013)
—	MF	SUI	Pascal Schürpf (at (Switzerland) Aarau which ended 3 August)
—	MF	SUI	Pascal Schürpf (to (Switzerland) Bellinzona from 31 January until 30 June 2013)
—	DF	SUI	Taulant Xhaka (at (Switzerland) Grasshopper until 30 June 2013)
—	DF	SUI	Genséric Kusunga (at (Switzerland) Servette until 30 June 2013)
—	MF	SUI	Stephan Andrist (at (Switzerland) Luzern until 30 June 2013)
35	FW	PRK	Pak Kwang-Ryong (at (Switzerland) Bellinzona, from 11 January 2013 until 30 June 2013)
19	MF	SUI	Simon Grether (to (Switzerland) Bellinzona from 31 January until 30 June 2013)
30	FW	SUI	Stjepan Vuleta (to (Switzerland) Wil from 5 February 2013 until 30 June 2013)

=== Transfers Summer 2012 ===
==== In ====
7	MF	SUI	David Degen (from BSC Young Boys)
18	GK	SUI	Germano Vailati (from St. Gallen)
19	MF	SUI	Simon Grether (from Basel U-21)
21	MF	CHI	Marcelo Díaz (from Universidad de Chile)
22	FW	EGY	Mohamed Salah (from Arab Contractors)
23	GK	SUI	Mirko Salvi (from Basel U-21)

==== Out ====
—	MF	SUI	Xherdan Shaqiri (to Bayern Munich – €10 million)
—	MF	SUI	Granit Xhaka (to Borussia Mönchengladbach – €8.5 million)
—	GK	SUI	Marcel Herzog (to St. Gallen – n/a)
—	DF	ARG	David Abraham (to Getafe – Free transfer)
—	MF	SUI	Benjamin Huggel (Retired)
—	MF	AUS	Scott Chipperfield (Retired)
—	GK	SUI	Massimo Colomba (Retired)

=== Transfers Winter 2012–13 ===
==== In ====
8	MF	CIV	Serey Die (from FC Sion – n/a)
11	MF	SUI	Endogan Adili (from Grasshopper Club Zürich – n/a)
17	FW	ARG	Raúl Bobadilla (from BSC Young Boys – n/a)
33	MF	EGY	Mohamed Elneny (from Arab Contractors on loan)

==== Out ====
29	DF	CZE	Radoslav Kováč (to Slovan Liberec free transfer)

== Results and fixtures ==
=== Legend ===
Win Draw Loss Postponed

=== Friendly matches ===
==== Preseason ====
23 June 2012 Pre-season	Basel	2–4	Steaua București	Sportgelände am Birkenmoos, Rottach-Egern
14:00 CEST	Salah 23' (1:2); D. Degen (yellow card) 36'; Andrist 83' (pen. 2:4)	FCB summary	14' (0:1) Rusescu; 16' (0:2) Rocha; 49' (1:3) F. Costea; 63' (1:4) Nikolić	Attendance: 400; Referee: Peter Sippel

26 June 2012 Pre-season	Basel	2–0	SpVgg Unterhaching	Sportplatz Warngau, Warngau
14:00	Streller 42' (1:0); Streller 55' (2:0); Cabral (yellow card) 78'	FCB summary		Attendance: 400; Referee: Christian Leicher (Landshut)

28 June 2012 Pre-season	FC Rottach-Egern	0–10	Basel	Sportgelände am Birkenmoos, Rottach-Egern
18:00		FCB summary	Pak 7' (0:1); D. Degen 24' (0:2); Frei 28' (0:3); D. Degen 41' (0:4); Dragović 59' (0:5); Andrist 60' (0:6); Vuleta 68' (0:7); Frei 83' (0:8); Dragović 86' (0:9); Zoua 88' (0:10)	Attendance: 250; Referee: Michael Krische

4 July 2012 Pre-season	FC Aarau	1–2	Basel	Stadion Rankhof, Basel
18:00	Garat (yellow card) 26'; Calla 80' (pen. 1:1)	FCB summary	15' (0:1) Streller; (yellow card) 26' Streller; (yellow card) 79' Markus Steinhöfer; 86' (1:2) Zoua	Attendance: 1,450; Referee: Rene Erlachner

8 July 2012 Pre-season	Basel	0–1	Standard Liège	Stadion Schützenmatte, Basel
14:30		FCB summary	86' (0:1) Ajdarević	Attendance: 1,523; Referee: Ludovic Gremaud

7 September 2012 Mid-season	Basel	2–3	1. FC Kaiserslautern	Stadion FC Solothurn, Solothurn
18:30	P. Degen 50' (1:2); Admir Seferagic 88' (2:3)	FCB summary	6' (0:1) Baumjohann; 43' (0:2) Nsor; 77' (1:3) Mohammadou Idrissou	Attendance: 1,200; Referee: Stephan Klossner

12 October 2012 Mid-season	Basel	7–0	FC Wohlen	Stadion Schützenmatte, Basel
15:00	Zoua 7' (1:0); Vuleta 30' (2:0); Frei 39' (3:0); Vuleta 49' (4:0); Zoua 51' (5:0); Yapi Yapo 52' (6:0); Jevtić 88' (7:0)	FCB summary		Attendance: 350; Referee: Pascal Erlachner

==== Winter break ====
12 January 2013 Winter break	Basel	0–3	Bayern Munich	St. Jakob-Park, Basel
16:30		FCB summary	7' (0:1) Mandžukić; 11' (0:2) Schweinsteiger; 14' (0:3) Ribéry	Attendance: 30,080; Referee: Adrien Jaccottet
Note: Fair match no yellow cards

18 January 2013 Winter break	Basel	1–1	Steaua București	Marbella Football Center, San Pedro de Alcántara
19:30	D. Degen (yellow card) 11'; Zoua 90+1' (1:1)	FCB summary	80' (0:1) Pintilii; (yellow card) Bourceanu.	Attendance: 400; Referee: Javier Moreno Muñoz

21 January 2013 Training camp	Basel	2–2	Ferencváros Budapest	Marbella Football Center, San Pedro de Alcántara
16:00	El-Nenny 44' (1:0); D. Degen 45' (2:0); Dragović (yellow card) 55' (yellow-red card) 68'	FCB summary	73' (2:1) Čukić; 86' (2:2) Čukić	Attendance: 65; Referee: Kim Jong-Hyeok, South Korea

23 January 2013 Training camp	Basel	0–1	Dynamo Kyiv	Marbella Football Center, San Pedro de Alcántara
16:30	Streller (yellow card) 35'; Yapi (yellow card) 36'; Serey Die (yellow card) 40'	FCB summary	43' (0:1) Kranjčar; (yellow card) 49' Celine; (yellow card) 60' Hacheridi	Attendance: 100; Referee: Kim Sung He, South Korea

24 January 2013 Training camp	Basel	2–1	China	Marbella Football Center, San Pedro de Alcántara
17:00	Díaz 17' (1:0); F. Frei 63' (2:0)	FCB summary	72' Gao Lin	Attendance: 100; Referee: Kim Jong-Hyeok, South Korea

30 January 2013 Winter break	Basel	2–0	Vaduz	Leichtathletik-Stadion St. Jakob, Basel
15:00	Stocker 24' (1:0); Zoua 49' (2:0)	FCB summary		Attendance: 500; Referee: Nikolaj Hänni

2 February 2013 Winter break	Basel	0–2	Biel	Stadion Rankhof, Basel
15:30		FCB summary	62' (0:2) Coly; (yellow card) 34' Doudin; 62' (0:2) Coly	Attendance: 1,200; Referee: Sascha Amhof

6 February 2013 Friendly	Basel	Cancelled	Bellinzona	Stadion Rankhof, Basel
15:00

=== Swiss Super League ===
Kickoff times are in CET

==== First half of season ====
13 July 2012 Round 1	Servette	0–1	Basel	Stade de Genève, Geneva
19:45	Lang (yellow card) 57'; De Azevedo (yellow card) 82'	FCB summary	(yellow card) 55' Steinhöfer; 59' (0:1) D. Degen; (yellow card) 90+5' P. Degen	Attendance: 8,132; Referee: (Switzerland) Sascha Kever

21 July 2012 Round 2	Basel	2–2	Luzern	St. Jakob-Park, Basel
19:45	Kováč (yellow card) 24'; Steinhöfer (yellow card) 30'; A. Frei 61' (1:1); Streller 81' (2:2)	FCB summary	18' (0:1) Lezcano; (yellow card) 21' Muntwiler; (yellow card) 44' Kryeziu; (yellow card) 66' Lezcano; 66' (1:2) Lezcano; (yellow card) 76' Puljić	Attendance: 29,256; Referee: (Switzerland) Alain Bieri

28 July 2012 Round 3	Grasshopper Club	2–2	Basel	Letzigrund, Zürich
19:45	Ben Khalifa 29' (1:1); Ben Khalifa (yellow card) 78'; Brahimi 82' (2:2)	FCB summary	15' (0:1) A. Frei; (yellow card) 24' Cabral; (yellow card) 42' Zoua; 47' (1:2) Yapi	Attendance: 7,050; Referee: (Switzerland) Sascha Amhof

4 August 2012 Round 4	Sion	1–1	Basel	Stade Tourbillon, Sion
19:45	Dingsdag (yellow card) 27'; Vanczák (yellow card) 64'; Itaperuna 80' (1:1); Léo (yellow card) 81'	FCB summary	(yellow card) 18' Cabral; (yellow card) 45' Voser; 48' (0:1) Kováč; (yellow card) 57' Serey Die; (yellow card) 65' Sommer; (yellow card) 70' Streller; (yellow card) 85' Kováč	Attendance: 14,850; Referee: (Switzerland) Nikolaj Hänni

12 August 2012 Round 5	Basel	3–1	Thun	St. Jakob-Park, Basel
16:00	Streller 9' (pen. 1:0); Streller 31' (2:0); Stocker 42' (3:1); F. Frei (yellow card) 83'; Streller (yellow card) 83'	FCB summary	(yellow card) 8' (yellow-red card) 22' Faivre; (yellow card) 28' Ghezal; 35' (2:1) Schirinzi; (yellow card) 43' Hediger	Attendance: 27,422; Referee: (Switzerland) Stephan Klossner

18 August 2012 Round 6	Basel	2–0	Lausanne-Sport	St. Jakob-Park, Basel
19:45	Streller 43' (1:0); Salah 82' (2:0)	FCB summary	(yellow card) 40' Katz; (yellow card) 90+2' Facchinetti	Attendance: 26,627; Referee: (Switzerland) Cyril Zimmermann (Münsingen)

25 August 2012 Round 7	St. Gallen	2–1	Basel	AFG Arena, St. Gallen
19:45 CEST	Čavušević 51' (1:1); Montandon (yellow card) 58'; Regazzoni 72' (2:1); Mathys (yellow card) 75'; Regazzoni (yellow card) 89'; Sutter (yellow card) 90+3'	FCB summary	10' (0:1) Zoua; (yellow card) 32' Kováč; (yellow card) 40' F. Frei; (yellow card) 83' Stocker; (yellow card) 90+3' D. Degen	Attendance: 18,841; Referee: (Switzerland) Stephan Studer

2 September 2012 Round 8	Basel	0–0	Zürich	St. Jakob-Park, Basel
16:00	Benito (yellow card) 28'	FCB summary		Attendance: 30,423; Referee: (Switzerland) Damien Carrel

23 September 2012 Round 9	Young Boys	1–1	Basel	Stade de Suisse, Bern
16:15	Zárate 49' (1:0); Spycher (yellow card) 52'	FCB summary	(yellow card) 53' F. Frei; (yellow card) 61' Díaz; 73' (1:1) Streller; (yellow card) 86' Stocker; (yellow card) 88' Cabral	Attendance: 22,757; Referee: (Switzerland) Stephan Studer

26 September 2012 Round 10	Basel	4–1	Sion	St. Jakob-Park, Basel
20:30	P. Degen (yellow card) 39'; P. Degen 42' (1:0); P. Degen 55' (2:1); Stocker 74' (3:1); Stocker (yellow card) 75'; Sauro 80' (4:1)	FCB summary	(yellow card) 42' Bühler; 43' (1:1) Gattuso; (yellow card) 85' Wüthrich; (yellow card) 87' Darragi	Attendance: 27,575; Referee: (Switzerland) Alain Bieri

29 September 2012 Round 11	Lausanne-Sport	1–1	Basel	Olympique de la Pontaise, Lausanne
19:45	Moussilou 63' (1:1); Gabri (yellow card) 76'; Sanogo (yellow card) 87'; Roux (yellow card) 90+1'	FCB summary	2' (0:1) Salah; (yellow card) 44' Dragović; (yellow card) 84' Schär	Attendance: 6,000; Referee: (Switzerland) Stephan Klossner

7 October 2012 Round 12	Basel	3–2	Servette	St. Jakob-Park, Basel
16:00	Schär 36' (1:1); D. Degen 37' (2:1); Streller 52' (3:1); Stocker (yellow card) 92'	FCB summary	12' (0:1) Tréand; (yellow card) 54' Kusunga; 65' (3:2) Lang; (yellow card) 90+4' Schneider	Attendance: 27,199; Referee: (Switzerland) Cyril Zimmermann

20 October 2012 Round 13	Luzern	1–0	Basel	Swissporarena, Luzern
16:00	Puljić (yellow card) 44' (Jahmir Hyka) Ajeti 60' (o.g. 1:0); Muntwiler (yellow card) 75'; (yellow card) 90+3' Winter	FCB summary	(yellow card) 40' Cabral; (yellow card) 42' D. Degen; (yellow card) 49' Dragović	Attendance: 16,253; Referee: (Austria) Gerhard Grobelnik

27 October 2012 Round 14	Zürich	1–2	Basel	Letzigrund, Zürich
	Gavranović 87' (1:2)	FCB summary	(yellow card) 23' D. Degen; 6' (0:1) Schär; (yellow card) 49' Schär; 29' (0:2) A. Frei	Attendance: 12,321; Referee: (Switzerland) Sascha Kever

3 November 2012 Round 15	Basel	2–0	Young Boys	St. Jakob-Park, Basel
19:45	Yapi 27' (1:0); Streller 39' (2:0); Stocker (yellow card) 90+1'	FCB summary	(yellow card) 14' Nuzzolo; (yellow card) 28'Wölfli; (yellow card) 53' Ojala	Attendance: 30,057; Referee: (Switzerland) Nikolaj Hänni

17 November 2012 Round 16	Basel	4–0	Grasshopper Club	St. Jakob-Park, Basel
17:00	D. Degen 7' (1:0); Schär (yellow card) 33'; Streller 57' (pen. 2:0); D. Degen (yellow card) 68'; A. Frei 72' (3:0); A. Frei 79' (4:0); Dragović (yellow card) 82'; P. Degen (yellow card) 85'	FCB summary	(yellow card) 21' Pavlović; (yellow card) 32' Toko; (yellow card) 57' Grichting	Attendance: 32,060; Referee: (Switzerland) Daniel Wermelinger

24 November 2012 Round 17	Thun	3–2	Basel	Arena Thun, Thun
16:00	Ngamukol 5' (1:0); Wittwer 64' (2:2); Hediger (yellow card) 90+1'; Faivre (yellow card) 90+3'; Ngamukol 88' (3:2)	FCB summary	32' (1:1) F. Frei; 39' (1:2) Streller; (yellow card) 90+1' Cabral	Attendance: 7,042; Referee: (Switzerland) Stephan Studer

1 December 2012 Round 18	Basel	1–0	St. Gallen	St. Jakob-Park, Basel
19:45	P. Degen (yellow card) 40'; Streller 67' (pen. 1:0)	FCB summary	(yellow card) 57' Montandon; (yellow card) 76' Mathys	Attendance: 30,062; Referee: (Switzerland) Sascha Kever

==== Second half of season ====
9 February 2013 Round 19	Basel	3–0	Sion	St. Jakob-Park, Basel
16:00	Streller 45' (1:0); P. Degen (yellow card) 50'; Salah 52' (2:0); Dragović (yellow card) 53'; Stocker 58' (3:0)	FCB Summary	(yellow card) 44' Gattuso; (yellow card) 50' Dingsdag; (yellow card) 57' Fernandes; (yellow card) 64' 'Djeng	Attendance: 24,265; Referee: (Switzerland) Stephan Studer

17 February 2013 Round 20	Lausanne-Sport	1–2	Basel	Pontaise, Lausanne
13:45	Marazzi (yellow card) 39'; Malonga 53' (1:2); Rodrigo (yellow card) 62'	FCB Summary	34' (0:1) Stocker; 42' (0:2) (yellow card) 53' Díaz; (yellow card) 53' Díaz; (yellow card) 60' Sauro; (yellow card) 88' Yapi	Attendance: 5,100; Referee: (Switzerland) Sascha Amhof

24 February 2013 Round 21	Basel	0–0	Grasshopper Club	St. Jakob-Park, Basel
16:00	Dragović (yellow card) 21'; Cabral (yellow card) 66'; Streller (yellow card) 82'; Schär (yellow card) 90+4'	FCB Summary	(yellow card) 17' Ben Khalifa; (yellow card) 27' Abrashi; (yellow card) 61' Hajrović; (yellow card) 90+4' Zuber	Attendance: 27'653; Referee: (Switzerland) Nikolaj Hänni

3 March 2013 Round 22	Servette	1–2	Basel	Stade de Genève, Geneva
13:45	Karanović 45+1' (1:1); Kossoko (yellow card) 16' (yellow-red card) 61'	FCB Summary	(yellow card) 19' F. Frei; 29' (0:1) Dragović; (yellow card) 45' Zoua; 63' (1:2) Dragović; (yellow card) 48' (yellow-red card) 64' Dragović	Attendance: 7,519; Referee: (Switzerland) Sascha Amhof

10 March 2013 Round 23	Basel	3–0	Young Boys	St. Jakob-Park, Basel
16:00	A. Frei 37' (1:0); Cabral (yellow card) 41'; Streller 62' (2:0); Schär 85' (3:0)	FCB Summary	(yellow card) 84' Doubai	Attendance: 27,818; Referee: (Switzerland) Sascha Kever

16 March 2013 Round 24	Basel	1–0	Thun	St. Jakob-Park, Basel
13:45	Zoua (yellow card) 36'; F. Frei (penalty missed) 54′ Dragović (yellow card) 78'; Streller 81' (1:0); Park (yellow card) 88'	FCB Summary	(yellow card) 40' Krstić; (yellow card) 82' Demiri	Attendance: 25,440; Referee: (Switzerland) Nikolaj Hänni

1 April 2013 Round 25	Luzern	0–4	Basel	Swissporarena, Luzern
13:45	Muntwiler (yellow card) 29'; Puljić (yellow card) 41'; Hyka (yellow card) 55'; Lustenberger (yellow card) 65'	FCB Summary	34' (0:1) Serey Die; 64' (0:2) Díaz; 71' (0:3) Salah; 83' (0:4) P. Degen; (yellow card) 90+3' Bobadilla	Attendance: 17,000 (sold out); Referee: (Switzerland) Stephan Studer

7 April 2013 Round 26	St. Gallen	1–1	Basel	AFG Arena, St. Gallen
16:00	Wüthrich 50' (1:0); Nushi (yellow card) 60'	FCB Summary	(yellow card) 2' Serey Die; (yellow card) 12' Yapi; 52' (1:1) Streller	Attendance: 19,500; Referee: (Switzerland) Alain Bieri (Solothurn)

14 April 2013 Round 27	Basel	3–1	Zürich	St. Jakob-Park, Basel
13:45	Schär (yellow card) 36'; A. Frei 55' (1:1); Schär 87' (pen. 2:1); Salah 88' (3:1)	FCB Summary	25' (0:1) Drmić; (yellow card) 38' Chermiti; (yellow card) 86' Béda; (yellow card) 86' Djimsiti	Attendance: 32, 328; Referee: (Austria) Oliver Drachta (Österreich)

21 April 2013 Round 28	Thun	2–2	Basel	Arena Thun, Thun
13:45	Ferreira (yellow card) 27'; Demiri 60' (1:1); Zuffi 70' (2:2)	FCB Summary	25' (0:1) Park; 65' (1:2) Díaz; (yellow card) 69' Schär; (yellow card) 71' F. Frei	Attendance: 5,791; Referee: (Switzerland) Sébastien Pache

27 April 2013 Round 29	Basel	0–3	Luzern	St. Jakob-Park, Basel
13:45	Sauro (yellow card) 64'; Zoua (yellow card) 79'	FCB Summary	14' (0:1) Gygax; 44' (0:2) Hochstrasser; 70' (0:3) Winter; (yellow card) 76' Puljić	Attendance: 28,440; Referee: (Switzerland) Alain Bieri (Solothurn)

4 May 2013 Round 30	Sion	0–1	Basel	Tourbillon, Sion
13:45	Gattuso (yellow card) 17'; Lafferty (yellow card) 81'; Dingsdag (yellow card) 51' (yellow-red card) 90+3'	FCB Summary	(yellow card) 42' Dragović; 44' (0:1) Díaz	Attendance: 9,500; Referee: (Switzerland) Sascha Kever

8 May 2013 Round 31	Zürich	3–1	Basel	Letzigrund, Zürich
20:30	Gajić 69' (1:1); Schönbächler 87' (2:1); Gavranović (yellow card) 90+1'; Pedro Henrique (yellow card) 90+1'; Pedro Henrique 90+3' (3:1); Ph. Koch (yellow card) 90+3'	FCB Summary	8' (0:1) Stocker; (yellow card) 30' F. Frei; (yellow card) 44' Streller	Attendance: 14,062; Referee: (Switzerland) Nikolaj Hänni

11 May 2013 Round 32	Basel	2–0	Servette	St. Jakob-Park, Basel
13:45	Stocker 32' (1:0); Dragović 42' (2:0)	FCB Summary	(yellow card) 56' Rüfli	Attendance: 26,787; Referee: (Switzerland) Stephan Klossner

16 May 2013 Round 33	Basel	2–0	Lausanne-Sport	St. Jakob-Park, Basel
19:45	F. Frei 20' (1:0); Streller (penalty missed) 42′ F. Frei 60' (2:0)	FCB Summary	(yellow card) 47' Sanogo	Attendance: 35,171 (sold out); Referee: (Switzerland) Sascha Amhof

25 May 2013 Round 34	Grasshopper Club	1–0	Basel	Zürich
16:15	Anatole 90+4' (1:0)	FCB Summary	(yellow card) 56' F. Frei	Stadium: Letzigrund; Attendance: 17,100; Referee: (Switzerland) Sascha Kever

29 May 2013 Round 35	Young Boys	0–1	Basel	Stade de Suisse, Bern
	Veškovac (yellow card) 55'; Bürki (yellow card) 72' (yellow-red card) 73'; Nef (yellow card) 88'	FCB Summary	55' (pen. 0:1) F. Frei; (yellow card) 57' F. Frei; (yellow card) 60' Stocker	Attendance: 19,322; Referee: (Switzerland) Sascha Kever

1 June 2013 Round 36	Basel	1–0	St. Gallen	St. Jakob-Park, Basel
20:30	Bobadilla 22' (1:0); (yellow card) 72' Dragović	FCB Summary	(yellow card) 38' Janjatović	Attendance: 34,060 (sold out); Referee: (Switzerland) Stephan Studer

==== League table ====
Pos	Team	Pld	W	D	L	GF	GA	GD	Pts	Qualification or relegation
1	Basel (C)	36	21	9	6	61	31	+30	72	Champions; Qualification to Champions League third qualifying round
2	Grasshopper	36	20	9	7	48	32	+16	69	Qualification to Champions League third qualifying round
3	St. Gallen	36	17	8	11	54	36	+18	59	Qualification to Europa League play-off round
4	Zürich	36	16	7	13	62	48	+14	55	Qualification to Europa League third qualifying round
5	Thun	36	13	9	14	44	46	−2	48	Qualification to Europa League second qualifying round
6	Sion	36	13	9	14	40	54	−14	48	
7	Young Boys	36	11	10	15	48	50	−2	43	
8	Luzern	36	10	12	14	41	52	−11	42	
9	Lausanne-Sport	36	8	9	19	32	51	−19	33	
10	Servette (R)	36	6	8	22	32	62	−30	26	Relegation to Swiss Challenge League

Source: Swiss Super League (in German)
Rules for classification: 1) points; 2) goal difference; 3) number of goals scored.
(C) Champions; (R) Relegated

=== Swiss Cup ===
15 September 2012 Round 1	FC Amriswil	1–6	Basel	Sportanlage Tellenfeld, Amriswil
16:30 CEST	Contartese 74'	SFV summary FCB summary	14', 32' Zoua; 30' F. Frei; 43', 84' A. Frei; (yellow card) 79' Cabral; 90' Salah	Attendance: 5,153; Referee: (Switzerland) Patrick Winter

11 November 2012 Round 2	Chiasso	1–4	Basel	Stadio Comunale, Chiasso
14:30	Pimenta 38'	SFV summary FCB summary	1' F. Frei; 19', 65' Zoua; 67' Díaz	Attendance: 1,500; Referee: (Switzerland) Sebastian Pache

9 December 2012 Round 3	Locarno	2–3 (a.e.t.)	Basel	Stadio Comunale Lido, Locarno
14:30	Mazzola 50', 55'	SFV summary FCB summary	43', 75' Salah; 117' Stocker	Attendance: 2,630; Referee: (Switzerland) Pascal Erlachner

27 February 2013 Quarterfinal	FC Thun	1–2 (a.e.t.)	Basel	Arena Thun, Thun
19:45	Renato Steffen (yellow card) 55'; Nelson Ferreira (yellow card) 72' (red card) 88'; Schneuwly 79'	SFV summary FCB summary	(yellow card) 11' D. Degen; 12', 115' A. Frei; (yellow card) 42' Sauro; (yellow card) 55' Steinhöfer; (yellow card) 78' Díaz	Attendance: 3,664; Referee: (Switzerland) Alain Bieri

17 April 2013 Semifinal	FC Sion	0–1	Basel	Stade Tourbillon, Sion
20:45	Gattuso (yellow card) 35'; Regazzoni (yellow card) 29'	SFV summary FCB summary	(yellow card) 29' Salah; 73' Stocker	Attendance: 13,800; Referee: (Switzerland) Nikolaj Hänni

Final

The winners of the Semi-finals stage played in the Final, which was held in the capital at the Stade de Suisse, Wankdorf.

20 May 2013
16:00
Final

Basel	1–1 (a.e.t.)	Grasshoppers
Schär (yellow card) 28'; Dragović (yellow card) 57'; Steinhöfer 71'; Elneny (yellow card) 91'	SFV summary FCB summary	(yellow card) 29' Gashi; 75' Hajrović
Penalties
Schär (penalty scored); F. Frei (penalty missed); Steinhöfer (penalty scored); Díaz (penalty scored); Bobadilla (penalty missed)	3–4	(penalty scored) Salatić; (penalty scored) Hajrović; (penalty missed) Lang; (penalty scored) Feltscher; (penalty scored) Vilotić

Stade de Suisse, Wankdorf, Bern
Attendance: 27,290
Referee: (Switzerland) Stephan Studer

GK	(Switzerland) Yann Sommer
DF	(Switzerland) Kay Voser		(substituted off) 60'
DF	(Switzerland) Fabian Schär	(yellow card) 28'
DF	(Austria) Aleksandar Dragović	(yellow card) 57'
DF	(South Korea) Park Joo-Ho
MF	(Switzerland) Fabian Frei
MF	(Chile) Marcelo Díaz
MF	(Egypt) Mohamed Elneny	(yellow card) 91'
MF	(Ivory Coast) Serey Die		(substituted off) 106'
MF	(Switzerland) Valentin Stocker
ST	(Switzerland) Marco Streller (c)		(substituted off) 69'
Substitutes:
DF	(Germany) Markus Steinhöfer		(substituted in) 60'
MF	(Argentina) Raúl Bobadilla		(substituted in) 69'
FW	(Switzerland) David Degen		(substituted in) 106'
Manager:
(Switzerland) Murat Yakin

GK	(Switzerland) Roman Bürki		(substituted off) 46'
DF	(Switzerland) Michael Lang
DF	(Serbia) Milan Vilotić
DF	(Switzerland) Stéphane Grichting
DF	(Austria) Moritz Bauer
MF	(Albania) Amir Abrashi		(substituted off) 95'
MF	(Switzerland) Vero Salatić
MF	(Bosnia and Herzegovina) Izet Hajrović
MF	(Albania) Shkëlzen Gashi	(yellow card) 29'	(substituted off) 100'
MF	(Switzerland) Steven Zuber		(substituted off) 66'
ST	(France) Anatole Ngamukol
Substitutes:
MF	(Venezuela) Frank Feltscher		(substituted in) 66'
MF	(Democratic Republic of the Congo) Nzuzi Toko		(substituted in) 95'
MF	(Switzerland) Nassim Ben Khalifa		(substituted in) 100'
Manager:
(Switzerland) Uli Forte

=== UEFA Champions League ===
==== Qualifying rounds ====
===== Second qualifying round =====
17 July 2012 1st Leg	Flora Tallinn (Estonia)	0–2	(Switzerland) Basel	A. Le Coq Arena, Tallinn
17:45 CET	Palatu (yellow card) 85'; Jürgenson (yellow card) 90+4'	FCB summary UEFA summary	65' (0:1) A. Frei; (yellow card) 74' Sauro; (yellow card) 79' Vuleta; 86' (pen. 0:2) A. Frei; (yellow card) 90+3' Stocker	Attendance: 3.123; Referee: Mauro Bergonzi (Italy)

24 July 2012 2nd Leg	Basel (Switzerland)	3–0 (5–0 agg.)	(Estonia) Flora Tallinn	St. Jakob-Park, Basel
20:00 CET	Zoua 9' (1:0); Zoua 31' (2:0); Díaz 62' (3:0)	FCB summary UEFA summary	(yellow card) 57' Luts	Attendance: 20.467; Referee: Artur Soares Dias (Portugal)

===== Third qualifying round =====
1 August 2012 1st Leg	Molde FK (Norway)	0–1	(Switzerland) Basel	Aker Stadion, Molde
19:00 CET	Hovland (yellow card) 14'; Angan (red card) 27'	FCB summary UEFA summary	(yellow card) 30' Steinhöfer; (yellow card) 42' Cabral; (yellow card) 75' Stocker; 78' (0:1) Zoua	Attendance: 6.564; Referee: Fredy Fautrel (France)

8 August 2012 2nd Leg	Basel (Switzerland)	1–1 (2–1 agg.)	(Norway) Molde FK	St. Jakob-Park, Basel
20:00 CET	D. Degen 75' (1:1); Dragović (yellow card) 90+2'; Sauro (yellow card) 90+2'; D. Degen (yellow card) 90+3'	FCB summary UEFA summary	32' (1:0) Berget	Attendance: 18,567; Referee: Vladislav Bezborodov (Russia)

==== Playoff round ====
21 August 2012 1st Leg	Basel (Switzerland)	1–2	(Romania) CFR Cluj	St. Jakob-Park, Basel
20:45 CET	Streller 44' (1:0); Stocker (yellow card) 46'; D. Degen (yellow card) 52'; Dragović (yellow card) 78'; Steinhöfer (yellow card) 90+4'; F. Frei (yellow card) 90+4'	FCB summary UEFA summary	(yellow card) 45' Kapetanos; (yellow card) 52' Felgueiras; (yellow card) 55' Bastos; 66' (1:1) Sougou; 71' (1:2) Sougou; (yellow card) 90+4' Saré	Attendance: 16,651; Referee: Jonas Eriksson (Sweden)

29 August 2012 2nd Leg	CFR Cluj (Romania)	1–0 (3–1 agg.)	(Switzerland) Basel	Cluj-Napoca, Romania
20:45 CET	Kapetanos 20' (1:0); Felgueiras (yellow card) 42'; Valente (yellow card) 45'; Nicoară (yellow card) 90+2'	FCB summary UEFA summary	(yellow card) 36' Díaz; (yellow card) 75' Cabral; (yellow card) 79' Andrist; (yellow card) 90' Steinhöfer	Stadium: Stadionul Dr. Constantin Rădulescu; Attendance: 15,481; Referee: Gianluca Rocchi

=== UEFA Europa League ===
==== Group stage ====
20 September 2012 Round 1	Sporting CP (Portugal)	0–0	(Switzerland) Basel	Estádio José Alvalade, Lisbon
21:05	Rojo (yellow card) 30'; Xandão (red card) 50'; Fernandes (yellow card) 60'	Uefa summary FCB summary	(yellow card) 67' Park; (yellow card) 82'Streller	Attendance: 22,325; Referee: Alon Yefet (Israel)

4 October 2012 Round 2	Basel (Switzerland)	2–2	(Belgium) Genk	St. Jakob-Park, Basel
19:00	Dragović (yellow card) 12'; P. Degen (yellow card) 25'; Streller 71' (pen. 1:2); Streller 84' (2:2)	Uefa summary FCB summary	10' (0:1) De Ceulaer; (yellow card) 15' Tshimanga; 38' (0:2) Vossen; (yellow card) 69' Koulibaly	Attendance: 14,023; Referee: Bülent Yıldırım (Turkey)

25 October 2012 Round 3	Videoton (Hungary)	2–1	(Switzerland) Basel	Sóstói Stadion, Székesfehérvár
19:00	Schär 2' (o.g. 1:0); Caneira 32' (2:0)	Uefa summary FCB summary	(yellow card) 79' Stocker; (yellow card) 85' Streller; 90+1' (2:1) Schär	Attendance: 8,500; Referee: Miroslav Zelinka (Czech Republic)

8 November 2012 Round 4	Basel (Switzerland)	1–0	(Hungary) Videoton	St. Jakob-Park, Basel
21:05	D. Degen (yellow card) 51'; Streller (yellow card) 68'; Streller 80' (1:0)	Uefa summary FCB summary	(yellow card) 35' Oliveira	Attendance: 12,743; Referee: Yevhen Aranovskiy (Ukraine)

22 November 2012 Round 5	Basel (Switzerland)	3–0	(Portugal) Sporting CP	St. Jakob-Park, Basel
19:00	Schär 23' (1:0); Cabral (yellow card) 54' (yellow-red card) 58'; Stocker 66' (2:0); D. Degen 71' (3:0); Ajeti (yellow card) 90+2'	Uefa summary FCB summary	(yellow card) 35' Insúa; (yellow card) 41' Labyad; (yellow card) 55' Fernandes; (yellow card) 61' Carrillo	Attendance: 15,666; Referee: Paolo Valeri (Italy)

6 December 2012 Round 6	Genk (Belgium)	0–0	(Switzerland) Basel	Cristal Arena, Genk
21:05	Limbombe (yellow card) 78'	Uefa summary FCB summary	(yellow card) 8' Dragović; (yellow card) 87' P. Degen	Attendance: 11,974; Referee: Mark Clattenburg (England)

Pos	Team	Pld	W	D	L	GF	GA	GD	Pts	Qualification
1	(Belgium) Genk	6	3	3	0	9	4	+5	12	Advance to knockout phase
2	(Switzerland) Basel	6	2	3	1	7	4	+3	9	Advance to knockout phase
3	(Hungary) Videoton	6	2	0	4	6	8	−2	6	
4	(Portugal) Sporting CP	6	1	2	3	4	10	−6	5	

Source: Soccerway

==== Knockout phase ====
Round of 32

14 February 2013 First leg	Basel (Switzerland)	2–0	(Ukraine) Dnipro Dnipropetrovsk	St. Jakob-Park, Basel
21:05	Stocker 23' (1:0); Park (yellow card) 49'; P. Degen (yellow card) 52'; Serey Die (yellow card) 54'; Streller 67' (2:0)	UEFA summary FCB Summary	(yellow card) 70' Mazuch; (yellow card) 79' Mandzyuk	Attendance: 8,314; Referee: Svein Oddvar Moen (Norway)

21 February 2013 Second leg	Dnipro Dnipropetrovsk (Ukraine)	1–1	(Switzerland) Basel	Dnipro Arena, Dnipropetrovsk
19:00	Fedetskiy (yellow card) 14'; Cheberyachko (yellow card) 32'; Strinić (yellow card) 35'; Kalinić (red card) 63'; Seleznyov 76' (pen. 1:0)	UEFA summary FCB Summary	(yellow card) 13' Serey Die; (yellow card) 33' Cabral; (yellow card) 37' Schär; (red card) 75' F. Frei; 81' (pen. 1:1) Schär	Attendance: 26,501; Referee: Deniz Aytekin (Germany)

Basel won 3–1 on aggregate.

Round of 16

7 March 2013 First leg	Basel (Switzerland)	2–0	(Russia) Zenit St. Petersburg	St. Jakob-Park, Basel
21:05	P. Degen (yellow card) 30'; Serey Die (yellow card) 53'; Díaz (yellow card) 72'; Díaz 83' (1:0); A. Frei 90+4' (pen. 2:0)	UEFA summary FCB Summary	(yellow card) 19' Witsel	Attendance: 15,008; Referee: Daniele Orsato (Italy)

14 March 2013 Second leg	Zenit St. Petersburg (Russia)	1–0	(Switzerland) Basel	Petrovsky Stadium, Saint Petersburg
18:00	Kerzhakov (yellow card) 15'; Witsel 30' (1:0); Denisov (yellow card) 72'; Shirokov (yellow card) 78'; Witsel (yellow card) 78'; Shirokov (penalty missed) 86′	UEFA summary FCB Summary	(yellow card) 41' (yellow-red card) 45' Díaz; (yellow card) 56' P. Degen; (yellow card) 78' F. Frei; (yellow card) 85' Park	Attendance: 19,500; Referee: Paweł Gil (Poland)

Basel won 2–1 on aggregate.

Quarter-finals

4 April 2013 First leg	Tottenham Hotspur (England)	2–2	(Switzerland) Basel	White Hart Lane, London
21:05	Gallas (yellow card) 29'; Adebayor 40' (1:2); Sigurðsson 58' (2:2); Parker (yellow card) 54'	UEFA summary FCB Summary	30' (0:1) Stocker; 34' (0:2) F. Frei; (yellow card) 47' F. Frei	Attendance: 32,136; Referee: Milorad Mažić (Serbia)

11 April 2013 Second leg	Basel (Switzerland)	2–2 (a.e.t.) (4–1 p)	(England) Tottenham Hotspur	St. Jakob-Park, Basel
21:05	Salah 27' (1:1); Dragović 49' (2:1); Serey Die (yellow card) 58'; Streller (yellow card) 93'; Elneny (yellow card) 103'	UEFA summary FCB Summary	23' (0:1) Dempsey; (yellow card) 39' Naughton; (yellow card) 46' Dembélé; 83' (2:2) Dempsey; (yellow card) 93' Dawson; (yellow card) 93' Walker	Attendance: 38,500; Referee: Olegário Benquerença (Portugal)
	Penalties
	Schär (penalty scored); Streller (penalty scored); F. Frei (penalty scored); Díaz (penalty scored)		(penalty missed) Huddlestone; (penalty scored) Sigurðsson; (penalty missed) Adebayor

4–4 on aggregate. Basel won 4–1 on penalties.

Semi-finals

25 April 2013 First leg	Basel (Switzerland)	1–2	(England) Chelsea	St. Jakob-Park, Basel
21:05	Dragović (yellow card) 70'; D. Degen (yellow card) 80'; Schär 87' (pen. 1:1); Schär (yellow card) 89'	UEFA summary FCB Summary	12' (0:1) Moses; (yellow card) 68' A. Cole; (yellow card) 83' David Luiz; (yellow card) 87' Azpilicueta; 90+4' (1:2) David Luiz	Attendance: 36,000; Referee: Pavel Královec (Czech Republic)

2 May 2013 Second leg	Chelsea (England)	3–1 (5–2 agg.)	(Switzerland) Basel	Stamford Bridge, London
21:05	Torres 50' (1:1); Moses 52' (2:1); Azpilicueta (yellow card) 55'; David Luiz 59' (3:1)	UEFA summary FCB Summary	45+1' (0:1) Salah; (yellow card) 66' Schär; (yellow card) 68' Steinhöfer; (yellow card) 88' Serey Die	Attendance: 39,403; Referee: Jonas Eriksson (Sweden)

Chelsea won 5–2 on aggregate.

== Statistics ==
=== Appearances and goals ===
No.	Pos	Nat	Player	Total		Super League		Swiss Cup		Champions League		Europa League	
No.	Pos	Nat	Player	Apps	Goals	Apps	Goals	Apps	Goals	Apps	Goals	Apps	Goals
Goalkeepers
1	GK	(Switzerland) SUI	Yann Sommer	58	0	36	0	3	0	5	0	14	0
18	GK	(Switzerland) SUI	Germano Vailati	2	0	0	0	1	0	1	0	0	0
23	GK	(Switzerland) SUI	Mirko Salvi	0	0	0	0	0	0	0	0	0	0
Defenders
3	DF	(South Korea) KOR	Park Joo-Ho	37	1	19+2	1	2	0	5	0	9	0
4	DF	(Switzerland) SUI	Philipp Degen	34	3	19+2	3	3	0	1	0	9	0
5	DF	(Switzerland) SUI	Arlind Ajeti	6	0	2+2	0	1	0	0	0	0+1	0
6	DF	(Austria) AUT	Aleksandar Dragović	54	4	32	3	3	0	6	0	13	1
15	DF	(Switzerland) SUI	Kay Voser	19	0	11+2	0	2	0	1	0	2+1	0
16	DF	(Switzerland) SUI	Fabian Schär	38	8	21	4	3	0	0+1	0	12+1	4
26	DF	(Argentina) ARG	Gastón Sauro	29	1	14+2	1	2+1	0	6	0	3+1	0
27	DF	(Germany) GER	Markus Steinhöfer	48	1	23+6	0	1+2	1	5	0	8+3	0
Midfielders
7	MF	(Switzerland) SUI	David Degen	45	5	17+9	3	1+1	0	6	1	7+4	1
8	MF	(Ivory Coast) CIV	Serey Die	24	1	12+2	1	3	0	0	0	7	0
10	MF	(Ivory Coast) CIV	Gilles Yapi Yapo	17	2	12	2	1	0	3	0	1	0
11	MF	(Switzerland) SUI	Endogan Adili	1	0	0+1	0	0	0	0	0	0	0
14	MF	(Switzerland) SUI	Valentin Stocker	51	11	29+2	6	2+1	2	3+1	0	13	3
20	MF	(Switzerland) SUI	Fabian Frei	46	6	24+3	4	2+1	1	1+2	0	8+5	1
21	MF	(Chile) CHI	Marcelo Díaz	47	7	19+7	4	3+1	1	6	1	8+3	1
24	MF	(Switzerland) SUI	Cabral	44	0	23+4	0	1+1	0	5	0	9+1	0
25	MF	(Switzerland) SUI	Darko Jevtić	2	0	1+1	0	0	0	0	0	0	0
33	MF	(Egypt) EGY	Mohamed Elneny	26	0	7+8	0	3	0	0	0	5+3	0
Forwards
9	FW	(Switzerland) SUI	Marco Streller	52	19	30+2	14	2+1	0	6	1	11	4
13	FW	(Switzerland) SUI	Alexander Frei	30	12	16+2	7	2	2	2+2	2	4+2	1
17	FW	(Argentina) ARG	Raúl Bobadilla	11	1	6+4	1	0+1	0	0	0	0	0
22	FW	(Egypt) EGY	Mohamed Salah	48	9	12+17	5	2+1	2	1+1	0	10+4	2
31	FW	(Cameroon) CMR	Jacques Zoua	41	6	7+17	1	1+1	2	2+3	3	1+9	0
Players away from the club on loan:
19	MF	(Switzerland) SUI	Simon Grether	4	0	0+2	0	0+1	0	0+1	0	0	0
30	FW	(Switzerland) SUI	Stjepan Vuleta	5	0	0+2	0	0+1	0	1+1	0	0	0
35	FW	(North Korea) PRK	Pak Kwang-Ryong	1	0	0	0	0+1	0	0	0	0	0
Players who appeared for Basel no longer at the club:
29	DF	(Czech Republic) CZE	Radoslav Kováč	6	1	4+1	1	0	0	0+1	0	0	0

Last updated: 29 May 2012
Source: Squad statistics and Start formations
Only competitive matches.
Using the most used start formation.
Ordered by position on pitch (from back right to front left).

== See also ==
- History of FC Basel
- List of FC Basel players
- List of FC Basel seasons

== Sources ==
- Rotblau: Jahrbuch Saison 2015/2016. Publisher: FC Basel Marketing AG. ISBN 978-3-7245-2050-4
- Rotblau: Jahrbuch Saison 2017/2018. Publisher: FC Basel Marketing AG. ISBN 978-3-7245-2189-1
- Die ersten 125 Jahre / 2018. Publisher: Josef Zindel im Friedrich Reinhardt Verlag, Basel. ISBN 978-3-7245-2305-5
- Season 2012–13 at "Basler Fussballarchiv” homepage
- Switzerland 2012–12 at RSSSF
