= Vuleta =

Vuleta is a surname. Notable people with the surname include:

- Franjo Vuleta (born 1968), Bosnian footballer
- Ivana Vuleta (born 1990), Serbian long jumper
- Stjepan Vuleta (born 1993), Swiss footballer
