= Raúl Bobadilla =

Paraguayan footballer (born 1987)

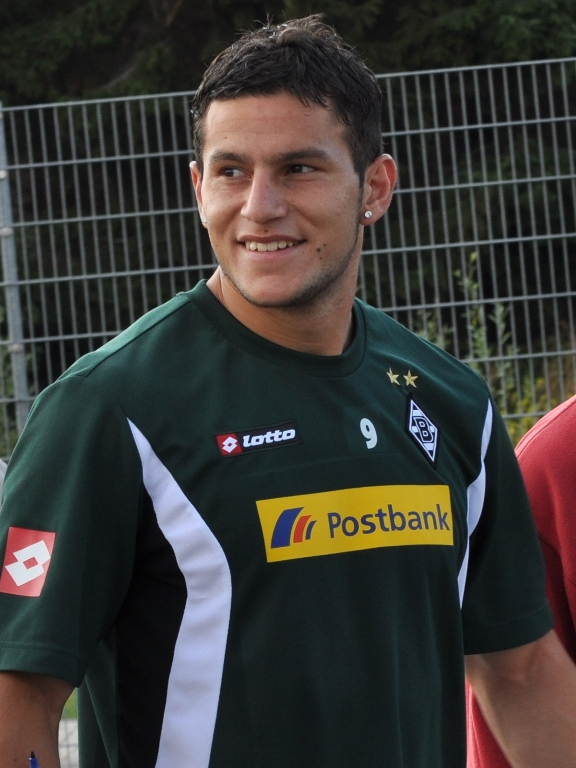
- Bobadilla with Borussia Mönchengladbach in 2010

Personal information
- Full name: Raúl Marcelo Bobadilla
- Date of birth: 18 June 1987 (age 39)
- Place of birth: Formosa, Argentina
- Height: 1.81 m (5 ft 11 in)
- Positions: Striker; winger

Team information
- Current team: Rapperswil-Jona
- Number: 25

Youth career
- 2005–2006: River Plate

Senior career*
Years	Team	Apps	(Gls)
2006–2007	River Plate	0	(0)
2006–2007	→ Concordia (loan)	28	(18)
2007–2009	Grasshopper	47	(26)
2009–2012	Borussia Mönchengladbach	59	(8)
2011	→ Aris (loan)	7	(2)
2012–2013	Young Boys	24	(12)
2013	FC Basel	10	(1)
2013–2017	FC Augsburg	94	(21)
2017–2018	Borussia Mönchengladbach	13	(0)
2018–2020	Argentinos Juniors	15	(0)
2020	→ Guaraní (loan)	24	(11)
2021–2022	Guaraní	5	(0)
2021	→ Fluminense (loan)	19	(4)
2022–2023	FC Schaffhausen	37	(16)
2023	Bandırmaspor	9	(1)
2024	FC Schaffhausen	17	(4)
2024–2026	FC Aarau	31	(1)
2026–	FC Rapperswil-Jona	4	(0)

International career
2015–2020	Paraguay	11	(0)
- * Club domestic league appearances and goals as of 18 September 2026

Raúl Marcelo Bobadilla (born 18 June 1987) is a professional footballer who plays as a striker for Swiss Challenge League club Rapperswil-Jona. Born in Argentina, he played for the Paraguay national team.

== Club career ==
=== Early career ===
Bobadilla originally started out at River Plate but moved to Concordia Basel in the Swiss Challenge League for the 2006–07 Swiss Challenge League season. Murat Yakin was trainer at that time and for Bobadilla this was a very successful season. He scored 18 goals in 28 League games and finished third in the goal scorer list at the end of the season. Yakin left Concordia and went to Grasshopper Club Zürich as assistant trainer to Hanspeter Latour for the 2007–08 Super League season and took Bobadilla with him. Bobadilla continued his good goalscoring form, becoming their first choice striker. Bobadilla finished in second place of the goal scorer list at the end of the season and was shortlisted in the Final 4 players for the Swiss League player of the year for the 2007–08 season, which was ultimately won by Hakan Yakin.

Bobadilla signed for Borussia Mönchengladbach on 11 June 2009 but returned to Switzerland in 2012 to play for Bern's BSC Young Boys.

=== Basel ===
On 3 January 2013, Basel announced that Bobadilla signed a contract until 2017. He joined Basel's first team during the winter break of their 2012–13 season under head coach Murat Yakin.

After playing in four test games, in the last of which he was injured, he made his league debut for Basel on 1 April in the 4–0 away win against Luzern being substituted in during the 77th minute of the game. He scored his first goal for his new club in the home game in the St. Jakob-Park on 1 June 2013. It was the only goal of the game as Basel won 1–0 against St. Gallen.

At the end of the Swiss Super League season 2012–13 he won the Championship title with the team. In the 2012–13 Swiss Cup Basel reached the final, but were runners up behind Grasshopper Club, being defeated 4–3 on penalties, following a 1–1 draw after extra time. In the 2012–13 UEFA Europa League, Basel advanced as far as the semi-finals, there being matched against the reigning UEFA Champions League holders Chelsea. Chelsea won both games advancing 5–2 on aggregate, eventually winning the competition.

Soon after the start of the next season, Bobadilla was caught speeding with his Maserati, driving with 111 km/h in a 50 km/h zone. On 15 August it was announced that Bobadilla would leave Basel. During his short period with the club, Bobadilla played a total of 25 games for Basel scoring three goals. 13 of these games were in the Swiss Super League, one in the Swiss Cup, one in the Champions League and ten were friendly games. He scored two goals in the domestic league and the other was scored during the test games.

=== Augsburg ===
On 15 August 2013, FC Augsburg announced that Bobadilla signed a contract until 30 June 2016.

On 9 May 2015, Bobadilla scored the only goal as Augsburg won away at Bayern Munich, who had already won the league title, a back-heel after a cross from Pierre-Emile Højbjerg, who was on loan from the opponent. In the 14th minute, he had been fouled by goalkeeper Pepe Reina for a penalty, resulting in Reina's dismissal, but Paul Verhaegh's shot hit the post with Manuel Neuer taking over in goal.

Bobadilla finished the 2014–15 season as Augsburg's top-scorer with 10 goals in all competitions.

=== Borussia Mönchengladbach ===
On 17 August 2017, after 4 years in Augsburg, Bobadilla returned to Borussia Mönchengladbach on a two-year contract.

=== Argentinos Juniors ===
Bobadilla returned to Argentina after spending one year with Borussia Mönchengladbach.

=== Guarani ===
On 27 December 2019, Bobadilla was loaned to Club Guaraní in Paraguay's Primera División.

=== Return to Schaffhausen ===
On 11 January 2024, Bobadilla returned to FC Schaffhausen in Switzerland.

=== Aarau ===
On 27 June 2024, Bobadilla signed with fellow Swiss side Aarau.

== International career ==
On 9 February 2015, it was reported by D10 and ABC Color that Bobadilla had begun the process of taking up Paraguay's nationality in order to represent the Paraguay national team, by way of his Paraguayan parents. On 11 March, he received his first call-up to the team, for friendlies later that month against Mexico and Costa Rica, making his debut in a 0–0 draw in San José.

On 28 May 2015, Bobadilla was included in Paraguay's 23-man squad for the 2015 Copa América by coach Ramón Díaz. He started in the team's opening 2–2 draw against Argentina in La Serena.

== Controversy ==
On 29 December 2020, after scoring and giving his team a 3–2 win, Bobadilla was threatened with a ban for partially exposing his genitals during a goal celebration.

== Honours ==
Basel

- Swiss Super League: 2012–13
- Swiss Cup runner up: 2012–13
