= Mirko Salvi =

Swiss footballer (born 1994)

Personal information
- Date of birth: 14 February 1994 (age 32)
- Place of birth: Yverdon-les-Bains, Switzerland
- Height: 1.88 m (6 ft 2 in)
- Position: Goalkeeper

Team information
- Current team: Basel
- Number: 13

Youth career
- 2001–2009: Yverdon-Sport
- 2009–2012: Basel

Senior career*
Years	Team	Apps	(Gls)
2011–2014	Basel U-21	64	(0)
2014–2015	→ Biel-Bienne (loan)	35	(0)
2015–2018	Basel	0	(0)
2016–2017	→ Lugano (loan)	44	(0)
2018–2021	Grasshopper Club	36	(0)
2018–2019	→ Luzern (loan)	10	(0)
2021–2022	Yverdon-Sport	17	(0)
2022–	Basel	28	(0)

International career^{‡}
2009	Switzerland U-15	1	(0)
2009–2010	Switzerland U-16	3	(0)
2010–2011	Switzerland U-17	6	(0)
2011–2012	Switzerland U-18	2	(0)
2012–2013	Switzerland U-19	1	(0)
2013–2014	Switzerland U-20	4	(0)
2014	Switzerland U-21	1	(0)
- * Club domestic league appearances and goals as of 28 September 2026 ‡ National team caps and goals as of 31 March 2015

Mirko Salvi (born 14 February 1994) is a Swiss professional footballer who plays as goalkeeper for Swiss Super League club Basel.

== Club career ==
=== Youth ===
Born in Yverdon-les-Bains, Salvi started his early and youth football with local club Yverdon-Sport. In the summer of 2009, he transferred to Basel and played in their U-16 team, where, at the end of the 2009–10 season, he won the Swiss Championship at U-16 level. In the final between the two group winners, they beat the Sion U-16 team 4–2, after being two goals down early in the game. The following season Salvi advanced to and played in the Basel U-18 team and for the 2011–12 season he advanced to their U-21 team, who played in the 1. Liga Promotion, the third tier of the Swiss football league system. During this season he also played for the Basel U-19 team in the newly founded NextGen Series. Here in the NextGen group 4 they faced Tottenham Hotspur, PSV Eindhoven and Internazionale. However, Basel were eliminated after the group stage.

Basel announced, on 31 May 2012, that Salvi had signed a three-year professional contract and would join their first team squad for trainings, but would stand between the posts with the U-21 team, thus gaining playing experience but profiting from professional care in the trainings.

=== Basel ===
At the end of the Swiss Super League season 2012–13 he won the Championship title and was Swiss Cup runner up with Basel. In the 2012–13 UEFA Europa League Basel advanced as far as the semi-finals, there being matched against the reigning UEFA Champions League holders Chelsea, but they were knocked out, losing both home and away ties, beaten 2–5 on aggregate. At the end of the Swiss Super League season 2013–14 he again won the Championship title and was Swiss Cup silver medal winner for the second time. During this period, as third Basel goalkeeper, he played regularly in their U-21 team and in some test games, but never in a league match.

On 19 May 2014, Basel announced that they were loaning out Salvi to Biel-Bienne in the Swiss Challenge League, so that he could gain first-team experience in an environment somewhat more competitive than with the Reserves in the 1. Liga Promotion. He became their starting goalie and played his Challenge League debut in the Stade de Genève on 20 July 2014 in a 1–2 away defeat against Servette. Biel-Bienne ended the season in last position in the division but due to the demotion of Servette FC for financial reason, FC Biel-Bienne escaped relegation. After the one-year loan, in which he played 35 of the possible 36 Challenge League games, he returned to Basel as their first team's third goalkeeper.

Salvi's debut in the FC Basel jersey came about under strange circumstances. FCB's number 1 keeper at that time was Tomáš Vaclík, but he injured his adductors during a training session. Basel's second goalkeeper Germano Vailati was therefore used in the closing match of the 2015–16 UEFA Europa League group stage, against Lech Poznań on 10 December 2015. However, Vailati injured himself with a misstep a few minutes before the half-time whistle and was no longer able to continue. Salvi didn't even have time to warm up and made his debut a few minutes later and helped the team to secure the 1–0 away victory.

After the winter break, on 7 January 2016, Basel announced that Salvi is loaned out to FC Lugano for the second half of the 2015–16 Super League season, where he established himself as the starting goalkeeper after a few games. He played with Lugano for one and a half seasons, returning to Basel during the summer 2017.

During their 2017–18 season, Salvi was again back up keeper behind Tomáš Vaclík and played only in four Swiss Cup matches, but no league games.

=== Grasshopper Club ===
Salvis contract had come to its end and on 24 May 2018 it was announced that Salvi had moved to Grasshopper Club. However, just a few days later it was announced that Salvi was loaned from GC to FC Luzern for the 2018–19 season. The contract that he signed had a definite purchase option, but at the end of the season, it was decided that the option would not exercised.

Salvi returned to Grasshopper Club, who in the meantime had suffered relegation to the Challenge League. Salvi played two years with GC and they ended the 2020–21 Challenge League season as division champions and won promotion. But Salvi's contract expired, and he left the club.

=== Yverdon-Sport ===
On 15 June 2021, he returned to his club of origin Yverdon-Sport on a one-year contract. Yverdon had just been promoted from the Promotion League, so Salvi remained in the Challenge League. They started the 2021–22 season badly, losing four of the first five games, conceding 14 goals. But then the team caught themselves, Salvi held five clean sheets in the next 11 games and the team rose in the league table to midfield. However, Salvi suffered a serious foot injury during training, he therefore missed the entire second half of the season and the contract was not prolonged.

=== Basel ===
On 10 June 2022, Salvi returned to Basel, on a two-year contract, as back up for number 1 keeper Marwin Hitz. Salvi joined Basel's first team for their 2022–23 season under head coach Alexander Frei. His first appearance came on 30 October, as Hitz injured himself during the first half of the match against Young Boys. Salvi was substituted on for the second half, but the team was already two goals down and were defeated 3–1 in the end. That season he gathered six league appearances, three in the Swiss Cup and two in the UEFA Europa Conference League. On 14 June 2024, he extended his contract with Basel for a further three years.

== International career ==
Salvi was born in Switzerland and is of Italian descent. Salvi made diverse appearances for the Switzerland U-15 and U16 national teams. He played his debut for their U17 team in a 1–0 away defeat against the Belgium U17 team on 26 August 2010. He played his debut for their U18 team in a 2–0 away win against Estonia U18 on 1 September 2011.

Salvi played his debut for their Swiss U21 team in a 1–1 away draw on 14 November 2014 against Germany U21 at the Karl-Liebknecht-Stadion in Potsdam.

== Career statistics ==
As of match played 14 May 2025.

Appearances and goals by club, season and competition
Club	Season	League			Cup		Europe		Other		Total	
Club	Season	Division	Apps	Goals	Apps	Goals	Apps	Goals	Apps	Goals	Apps	Goals
Basel	2012–13	Swiss Super League	0	0	0	0	0	0	—		0	0
Basel	2013–14	Swiss Super League	0	0	0	0	0	0	—		0	0
Basel	2015–16	Swiss Super League	0	0	1	0	0	0	—		1	0
Basel	2017–18	Swiss Super League	0	0	3	0	0	0	—		3	0
Basel	Total		0	0	4	0	0	0	—		4	0
Biel-Bienne (loan)	2014–15	Swiss Challenge League	35	0	0	0	—		—		35	0
Lugano (loan)	2015–16	Swiss Super League	11	0	1	0	—		—		12	0
Lugano (loan)	2016–17	Swiss Super League	33	0	0	0	—		—		33	0
Lugano (loan)	Total		44	0	1	0	—		—		45	0
Grasshopper Club	2019–20	Swiss Challenge League	36	0	3	0	—		—		39	0
Luzern (loan)	2018–19	Swiss Super League	10	0	0	0	2	0	—		12	0
Yverdon-Sport	2021–22	Swiss Challenge League	17	0	3	0	—		—		20	0
Basel	2022–23	Swiss Super League	6	0	3	0	2	0	—		11	0
Basel	2023–24	Swiss Super League	6	0	2	0	2	0	—		10	0
Basel	2024–25	Swiss Super League	3	0	2	0	—		—		5	0
Basel	Total		15	0	7	0	4	0	—		26	0
Career total			157	0	18	0	6	0	0	0	181	0

== Titles and Honours ==
Basel

- Swiss Champion at U16 level: 2009–10
- Swiss Super League champion: 2012–13, 2013–14, 2024–25
- Swiss Cup runner up: 2012–13, 2013–14

Grasshopper Club

- Swiss Challenge League: 2020–21
