= Markus Steinhöfer =

German footballer

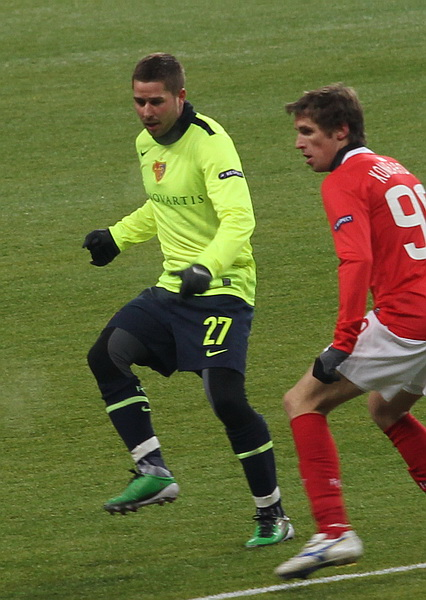
- Steinhöfer in 2011

Personal information
- Date of birth: 7 March 1986 (age 40)
- Place of birth: Weißenburg in Bayern, West Germany
- Height: 1.75 m (5 ft 9 in)
- Positions: Right-back; midfielder

Youth career
- 1989–1998: DSC Weißenburg
- 1998–1999: TSV Roth
- 1999–2002: 1. FC Nürnberg
- 2002–2004: Bayern Munich

Senior career*
Years	Team	Apps	(Gls)
2004–2008	Bayern Munich II	57	(2)
2006–2008	→ Red Bull Salzburg (loan)	48	(2)
2008–2010	Eintracht Frankfurt	41	(3)
2008–2010	Eintracht Frankfurt II	1	(1)
2010	→ 1. FC Kaiserslautern (loan)	15	(2)
2011–2013	Basel	76	(1)
2013–2014	Real Betis	3	(0)
2014–2015	1860 Munich	18	(0)
2014	1860 Munich II	4	(1)
2015	VfR Aalen	9	(3)
2015–2016	Sparta Prague	7	(0)
2017–2018	Darmstadt 98	22	(0)
2018–2019	VfB Eichstätt	21	(4)
Total		322	(19)

International career
	Germany U16	9	(1)
2004	Germany U18	2	(0)
2003–2005	Germany U19	9	(2)
2007	Germany U21	3	(0)
- * Club domestic league appearances and goals

Markus Steinhöfer (born 7 March 1986) is a German former professional footballer who played as a right-back.

== Club career ==
=== Youth football ===
Steinhöfer began his early football with local amateur club DSC Weißenburg. Via TSV Roth he then joined the youth division of 1. FC Nürnberg. In 2002 he joined the B-Juniors (later U-17) in the youth department of Bayern Munich. A year later he advanced to their A-Junioren (later U-19) and was part of the team that won the final in the A-Junioren-Bundesliga 2003–04. At the same time, as of February 2004, he made his first appearances for the FC Bayern München Amateure in the third-tier Regionalliga Süd, winning the championship title in that division at the end of the season. The following season he was regular starter in the team. He played with the team for two seasons and was then loaned to Red Bull Salzburg.

=== Red Bull Salzburg ===
In summer 2006 he joined Austrian Bundesliga team Red Bull Salzburg under head coach Giovanni Trapattoni.First playing with their reserve team, he gradually became regular player in their first team and won the Austrian Bundesliga 2006–07. In the following season he then made his first European appearances, but failed with Salzburg both in the Champions League qualifying round and in the UEFA Cup first round. In the domestic league, he and his team finished second behind the new champions Rapid Wien.

=== Eintracht Frankfurt ===
In July 2008, Steinhöfer moved to Eintracht Frankfurt for a fee of €900,000. Under head coach Friedhelm Funkel Steinhöfer was a regular starter, he played in 32 of the 34 league matches. However, in his second season following the change of manager to Michael Skibbe, Steinhöfer struggled to find a regular spot in the team and announced that it was his intention to transfer.

==== Kaiserslautern (loan) ====
On 29 December 2009, Eintracht Frankfurt loaned him to 1. FC Kaiserslautern, one division lower, until the end of the season. In the 2. Bundesliga Steinhöfer played 15 games and scored two goals for FCK. At the end of the 2009–10 2. Bundesliga season Kaiserslautern were division champions and achieved promotion.

==== Return to Frankfurt ====
In the summer of 2010 Steinhöfer returned to Frankfurt. Again, he was barely taken into consideration by coach Skibbe and only substituted in on in four league games and so was unable to make an impact. In January 2011 Steinhöfer left Frankfurt to join FC Basel.

=== Basel ===
On 25 January 2011 FC Basel announced the change in their defensive right-back position. Samuel Inkoom had transferred out to Dnjepr Dnjepropetrovsk and Steinhöfer had signed in from Eintracht Frankfurt to them on a two-and-a-half-year contract. He joined Basel's first team for their 2011–12 season under head coach Thorsten Fink. After playing in one test game, Steinhöfer played his domestic league debut for his new club in the away game in the Stadion Lachen on 6 February 2011 as Basel won 3–2 against FC Thun. He played in all 18 Swiss Super League games and at the end of the 2010–11 season Steinhöfer won the Championship title with Basel.

To the beginning of their 2011–12 season Steinhöfer was member of the Basel team that won the 2011 Uhrencup, beating both Hertha Berlin 3–0 and West Ham United 2–1 to lead the table on goal difference above Young Boys. Basel entered the 2011–12 UEFA Champions League in the group stage. On 7 December 2011, during the Champions League group C match at home in the St. Jakob-Park against Manchester United, trying to make a clearance, Steinhöfer volleyed the ball against his own crossbar. The ball bounced back into play and the defence were able to clear it away. Basel won the match 2–1, sending United out of the Champions league. Steinhöfer's fans created a song to celebrate this feat. Basel advanced to the knockout phase. But in the round of 16, despite a 1–0 home win against Bayern Munich, it was the German team who advanced to the next round.

Steinhöfer scored his first Super League goal in the 3–0 away win against Sion on 22 April 2012. At the end of the 2011–12 season he won the Double with his new club. They won the League Championship title with 20 points advantage. The team won the Swiss Cup, winning the final 4–2 in a penalty shootout against Luzern.

Basel had started in the 2012–13 UEFA Champions League in the qualifying rounds. But were knocked out of the competition by CFR Cluj in the play-off round. They then continued in the 2012–13 UEFA Europa League group stage. Ending the group in second position, Basel continued in the knockout phase and advanced as far as the semi-finals, there being matched against the reigning UEFA Champions League holders Chelsea. Chelsea won both games advancing 5–2 on aggregate, eventually winning the competition.

At the end of the Super League season 2012–13 Steinhöfer won his third Championship title with the team. In the 2012–13 Swiss Cup Basel reached the final and played in the Stadion Wankdorf in Bern against the Grasshoppers. Steinhöfer scored in the 71st minute, a left footed shot from about 10 Meters out, that was slightly deflected off the back of a defender. However GC drew level and won the affair 4–3 on penalties, following a 1–1 draw after extra time.

In a long season with a total of 76 games (62 in League, Cup, European Champions League, Europa League and 14 test matches) he had a total of 63 appearances. After two and a half years in Basel his contract was not extended. During his time with the club, Steinhöfer played a total of 149 games for Basel scoring a total of three goals. 76 of these games were in the Swiss Super League, eight in the Swiss Cup, 26 in the UEFA competitions (Champions League and Europa League) and 39 were friendly games. He scored one goal in the domestic league, one in the cup and the other was scored during the test games.

=== Frequent club changes ===
For the 2013/14 season he moved to the Spanish first division team Real Betis, and on 3 November 2013 (12th matchday) he played his debut for them in the 2-3 defeat in the away game against FC Málaga. He stayed with Betis only until the end of the year.

Subsequently, Steinhöfer returned to Germany and played for 2. Bundesliga club 1860 Munich. His contract was dissolved on 1 February 2015. Just on the following day he moved to league rivals VfR Aalen, signing a contract until the end of the season. Aalen suffered relegation and his contract ran out.

On 17 June 2015, Steinhöfer's signing was announced by Sparta Prague of the Czech Republic. He played there for one season.

Following that Steinhöfer went to SV Darmstadt 98 who at that time played in the German Bundesliga. Darmstadt ended the season bottom of the table and they suffered relegation to the 2. Bundesliga. Steinhöfers contract was canceled at the end of 2017–18 season.

In September 2018 Steinhöfer signed a contract with amateur club VfB Eichstätt in Regionalliga Bayern and Steinhöfer concluded his professional career.

== International career ==
Steinhöfer played for multiple Germany national youth teams, including the Germany U21 team.

== Career statistics ==
Appearances and goals by club, season and competition
Club	Season	League			Cup		Continental		Total	
Club	Season	Division	Apps	Goals	Apps	Goals	Apps	Goals	Apps	Goals
Bayern Munich II	2003–04	Regionalliga Süd	8	1	—		—		8	1
Bayern Munich II	2004–05	Regionalliga Süd	20	1	4	0	—		24	1
Bayern Munich II	2005–06	Regionalliga Süd	29	0	—		—		29	0
Bayern Munich II	Total		57	2	4	0	—		61	2
Red Bull Salzburg (loan)	2006–07	Austrian Bundesliga	16	0	2	1	0	0	18	1
Red Bull Salzburg (loan)	2007–08	Austrian Bundesliga	32	2	0	0	6	0	38	2
Red Bull Salzburg (loan)	Total		48	2	2	1	6	0	56	3
Eintracht Frankfurt	2008–09	Bundesliga	32	3	2	0	—		34	3
Eintracht Frankfurt	2009–10	Bundesliga	5	0	1	0	—		6	0
Eintracht Frankfurt	2010–11	Bundesliga	4	0	0	0	—		4	0
Eintracht Frankfurt	Total		41	3	3	0	—		44	3
Eintracht Frankfurt II	2009–10	Regionalliga Süd	1	1	—		—		1	1
1. FC Kaiserslautern (loan)	2009–10	2. Bundesliga	15	2	0	0	—		15	2
Basel	2010–11	Swiss Super League	18	0	0	0	2	0	20	0
Basel	2011–12	Swiss Super League	29	1	1	0	8	0	38	1
Basel	2012–13	Swiss Super League	29	0	2	1	16	0	47	1
Basel	Total		76	1	3	1	26	0	105	2
Real Betis	2013–14	La Liga	3	0	1	0	6	0	10	0
1860 Munich	2013–14	2. Bundesliga	12	0	0	0	—		12	0
1860 Munich	2014–15	2. Bundesliga	6	0	1	0	—		7	0
1860 Munich	Total		18	0	1	0	—		19	0
1860 Munich II	2014–15	Regionalliga Bayern	4	1	—		—		4	1
VfR Aalen (loan)	2014–15	2. Bundesliga	9	3	0	0	—		9	3
Sparta Prague	2015–16	Czech First League	7	0	0	0	2	0	9	0
Darmstadt 98	2016–17	Bundesliga	7	0	0	0	—		7	0
Darmstadt 98	2017–18	2. Bundesliga	15	0	1	0	—		16	0
Darmstadt 98	Total		22	0	1	0	—		23	0
VfB Eichstätt	2018–19	Regionalliga Bayern	21	4	0	0	0	0	21	4
Career total			322	19	15	2	40	0	377	21

== Honours ==
Bayern Munich II

- IFA Shield: 2005

Red Bull Salzburg

- Austrian Bundesliga: 2006–07

FC Basel

- Swiss Super League: 2010–11, 2011–12, 2012–13
- Swiss Cup: 2011–12
- Uhrencup: 2011
