= List of Swiss football transfers summer 2016 =

This is a list of Swiss football transfers in the 2016 summer transfer window by club. Only clubs in the 2016–17 Swiss Super League are included.

== Swiss Super League ==
=== Basel ===
In:

No.	Pos.	Nation	Player
4	DF	EGY	Omar Gaber (from (Egypt) Zamalek)
6	MF	CIV	Serey Die (from (Germany) VfB Stuttgart)
13	GK	SRB	Đorđe Nikolić (from (Serbia) Jagodina)
24	FW	NOR	Mohamed Elyounoussi (from (Norway) Molde)
25	DF	PAR	Blás Riveros (from (Paraguay) Olimpia)
88	FW	CIV	Seydou Doumbia (on loan from (Italy) Roma)

Out:

No.	Pos.	Nation	Player
4	DF	SUI	Philipp Degen (retired)
22	MF	SRB	Zdravko Kuzmanović (on loan to (Spain) Málaga)
23	GK	SUI	Mirko Salvi (on loan to (Switzerland) Lugano)
27	DF	ALB	Naser Aliji (to (Germany) 1. FC Kaiserslautern)
30	MF	SUI	Cedric Itten (on loan to (Switzerland) Luzern)
36	FW	SUI	Breel Embolo (to (Germany) FC Schalke 04)

=== Grasshopper ===
In:

No.	Pos.	Nation	Player
10	MF	DEN	Lucas Andersen (from (Netherlands) Ajax)
14	DF	SUI	Numa Lavanchy (from (Switzerland) Lausanne-Sport)
20	FW	SUI	Ridge Munsy (from (Switzerland) Thun)

Out:

No.	Pos.	Nation	Player
9	FW	ISR	Moanes Dabour (to (Austria) Red Bull Salzburg)
34	DF	SUI	Moritz Bauer (to (Russia) Rubin Kazan)
—	DF	SUI	Daniel Pavlović (to (Italy) Sampdoria, previously on loan at (Italy) Frosinone)

=== Lausanne ===
In:

No.	Pos.	Nation	Player
13	DF	ITA	Paolo Frascatore (on loan from (Italy) Roma)
19	FW	ITA	Francesco Margiotta (on loan from (Italy) Juventus)

Out:

No.	Pos.	Nation	Player
19	DF	SUI	Numa Lavanchy (to (Switzerland) Grasshopper)

=== Lugano ===
In:

No.	Pos.	Nation	Player
17	MF	HUN	Bálint Vécsei (on loan from (Italy) Bologna)
23	GK	SUI	Mirko Salvi (on loan from (Switzerland) Basel)
27	FW	ITA	Lorenzo Rosseti (on loan from (Italy) Juventus)
99	FW	VEN	Andrés Ponce (on loan from (Italy) Sampdoria)

Out:

No.	Pos.	Nation	Player
13	DF	ALB	Frédéric Veseli (to (Italy) Empoli)

=== Luzern ===
In:

No.	Pos.	Nation	Player
9	FW	AUS	Tomi Juric (from (Netherlands) Roda JC)
30	MF	SUI	Cedric Itten (on loan from (Switzerland) Basel)

Out:

No.	Pos.	Nation	Player
28	MF	GER	Clemens Fandrich (to (Germany) Erzgebirge Aue)

=== Sion ===
In:

No.	Pos.	Nation	Player
—	DF	CIV	Arthur Boka (from (Spain) Málaga)

Out:

No.	Pos.	Nation	Player
—	MF	SUI	Matteo Fedele (to (Italy) Carpi, previously on loan)

=== St. Gallen ===
In:

No.	Pos.	Nation	Player

Out:

No.	Pos.	Nation	Player

=== Thun ===
In:

No.	Pos.	Nation	Player

Out:

No.	Pos.	Nation	Player
6	MF	LIE	Sandro Wieser (to (England) Reading)
20	FW	SUI	Ridge Munsy (to (Switzerland) Grasshopper)

=== Vaduz ===
In:

No.	Pos.	Nation	Player
22	GK	SUI	Benjamin Siegrist (from (England) Aston Villa)

Out:

No.	Pos.	Nation	Player

=== Young Boys ===
In:

No.	Pos.	Nation	Player
19	MF	AUT	Thorsten Schick (from (Austria) Sturm Graz)
24	DF	GHA	Kasim Nuhu (on loan from (Spain) Mallorca)
43	DF	SUI	Kevin Mbabu (on loan from (England) Newcastle United)

Out:

No.	Pos.	Nation	Player
44	FW	AUT	Philipp Zulechner (loan return to (Germany) SC Freiburg)
