= Germano Vailati =

Swiss footballer (born 1980)

Personal information
- Date of birth: 30 August 1980 (age 46)
- Place of birth: Lugano, Switzerland
- Height: 1.87 m (6 ft 2 in)
- Position: Goalkeeper

Team information
- Current team: FC Basel (youth goalkeeper coach)

Youth career
- 1991–1996: FC Savosa-Massagno
- 1996–1999: Lugano

Senior career*
Years	Team	Apps	(Gls)
1999–2000	Lugano	2	(0)
2000–2001	FC Locarno	0	(0)
2000–2001	Chiasso	4	(0)
2001–2002	Bellinzona	9	(0)
2002–2003	Lugano	4	(0)
2003–2004	FC Malcantone Agno	13	(0)
2004–2009	Sion	77	(0)
2009	→ Metz (loan)	18	(0)
2009–2012	St. Gallen	42	(0)
2012–2018	FC Basel	14	(0)
2012	Basel U21	1	(0)
Total		184	(0)

International career
2007–2008	Switzerland	0	(0)

Managerial career
- FC Basel: Goalkeeper coach (youth)
- * Club domestic league appearances and goals

Germano Vailati (born 30 August 1980) is a Swiss former professional football goalkeeper.

== Club career ==
Vailati was born in Lugano. He started his professional career in the Canton Ticino, and played for a number of different teams, before he transferred to the prestigious club FC Sion in the summer of 2004. In the 2006–07 season Sion were promoted to the Super League. In the 2006–07 and 2007–08 seasons he played for in their first time in UEFA Cup. He was on 22 November 2008 on trial by FC Metz and was signed on a six-month loan on 27 November 2008.

On 14 January 2010, FC St. Gallen signed the Swiss goalkeeper from FC Sion until June 2012.

On 20 June 2012, it was announced that Vailati had transferred to FC Basel on a free transfer.

He joined Basel's first team during their 2012–13 season under head coach Heiko Vogel. After appearing in two test matches, Vailati played his team debut on 24 July 2012 in the 2012–13 UEFA Champions League Second qualifying round 3–0 home win against Flora Tallinn. He played in three games in the Swiss Cup, once in the U21 team and was the first team's number two goalie, and remained the number two after Murat Yakin became new the head coach. At the end of the Swiss Super League season 2012–13 he won the Championship title with the team. In the 2012–13 Swiss Cup Basel reached the final, but were runners up behind Grasshopper Club, being defeated 4–3 on penalties, following a 1–1 draw after extra time. Basel had started in the 2012–13 UEFA Champions League in the qualifying rounds. But were knocked out of the competition by CFR Cluj in the play-off round. They then continued in the 2012–13 UEFA Europa League group stage. Ending the group in second position, Basel continued in the knockout phase and advanced as far as the semi-finals, there being matched against the reigning UEFA Champions League holders Chelsea. Chelsea won both games advancing 5–2 on aggregate, eventually winning the competition.

Vailati played his domestic league debut with the team in the home game in the St. Jakob-Park on 23 November 2013 as Basel won 4–1 against Thun. At the end of the 2013–14 Super League season Vailati won his second league championship with Basel. The team also reached the final of the 2013–14 Swiss Cup, but were beaten 2–0 by Zürich after extra time. Vailati played in four of the six cup games. Basel joined the 2013–14 Champions League in the qualifying rounds and they advanced to the group stage. Finishing in third place in their group, Basel qualified for Europa League knockout phase and here they advanced as far as the quarter-finals. But eventually they were beaten by Valencia 5-3 on aggregate, after extra time.

For Basel's 2014–15 season Paulo Sousa was appointed as new head coach and it was a very successful season for the team. In the 2014–15 Swiss Cup Basel reached the final, but for the third consecutive season they finished the competition as runners-up, losing 0–3 against Sion. Vailati played in all six cup games including the final. At the end of the 2014–15 league season Vailati won the championship with Basel for the third time. On 28 January 2015 FCB extended their contract with Vailati for a further year.

Under trainer Urs Fischer Vailati again won the Swiss Super League championship at the end of the 2015–16 Super League season.

At the end of the 2016–17 Super League season Vailati won the championship for the fifth consecutive time. For the club this was the eighth title in a row and their 20th championship title in total. They also won the 2016–17 Swiss Cup, defeating Sion 3–0 in the final, which meant they had won the double. On 23 May 2017 Vailati extended his contract for a further year.

At the end of the 2016–17 Super League season Vailaiti retired from active football. Before of the last home match of the season, FCB said good bye and thank you to several players including long time goalkeeper Germano Vailati.

During his active football time with Basel's first team Vailati played a total of 73 games for Basel. 14 of these games were in the Swiss Super League, 19 in the Swiss Cup, four in the UEFA competitions (Champions League and Europa League) and 36 were friendly games.

Vailati stayed with the club and became goalkeeper coach for their youth teams, first U-16 team and in the meantime has advanced to the U-18 team.

== International career ==
Vailati was born in Switzerland and is of Italian descent. He was called up for the Swiss national team in November 2007, as the fourth goalkeeper for the Euro 2008 campaign. However, he still has no caps.

== Honours ==
Sion

- Swiss Challenge League Promoted: 2005–06
- Swiss Cup: 2005–06

Basel

- Swiss Super League: 2012–13, 2013–14, 2014–15, 2015–16, 2016–17
- Swiss Cup: 2016–17
- Uhren Cup: 2013
