= Franjo Vuleta =

Bosnian footballer

Personal information
- Full name: Franjo Vuleta
- Date of birth: 31 January 1968 (age 58)
- Place of birth: Vitez
- Position: Striker

Youth career
- 1981—1985: Vitez

Senior career*
Years	Team	Apps	(Gls)
1985–1989	Vitez		
1989–1990	Sarajevo	13	(3)
- FC Buchs
- * Club domestic league appearances and goals

Franjo Vuleta (born 31 January 1968) is a Bosnian retired footballer who for the most of his career played in Switzerland where he arrived from Bosnia before the war. He played as a striker.

His son Stjepan Vuleta is also a professional football player.

== Career ==
Vuleta started playing in lower league side NK Vitez, the club from his hometown. Good display drew attraction of Sarajevo so he and his teammate Vejsil Varupa signed for this first league team in the summer of 1989. After just one season, he moved to Switzerland where he continued to play in amateur level until the age of 42.
