= Jérôme Schneider =

Swiss footballer (born 1981)

Personal information
- Full name: Jérôme Schneider
- Date of birth: 4 November 1981 (age 45)
- Place of birth: Neuchâtel, Switzerland
- Height: 1.82 m (6 ft 0 in)
- Position: Defender

Senior career*
Years	Team	Apps	(Gls)
1999–2003	Neuchâtel Xamax	67	(3)
2003	SR Delémont	15	(1)
2003–2008	La Chaux-de-Fonds	135	(11)
2008–2013	Servette	116	(2)
2013–2015	Neuchâtel Xamax	35	(2)
2015–2017	Colombier	34	(1)
- * Club domestic league appearances and goals

Jérôme Schneider (born 4 November 1981) is a former Swiss footballer.
