= Philippe Montandon =

Swiss footballer (born 1982)

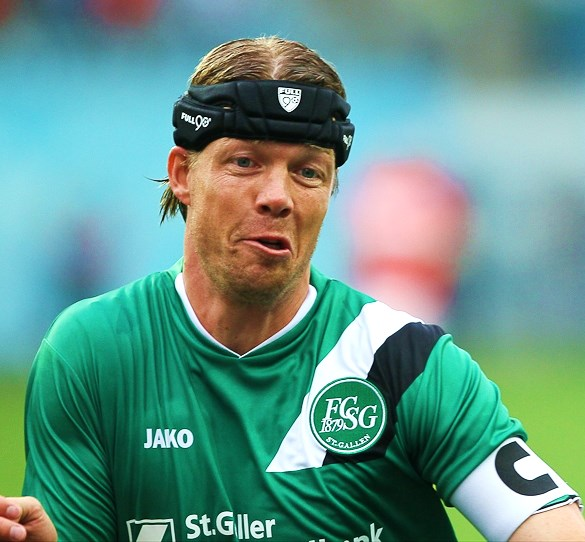

Personal information
- Full name: Philippe Montandon
- Date of birth: 15 July 1982 (age 44)
- Place of birth: Uster, Switzerland
- Height: 1.89 m (6 ft 2 1/2 in)
- Position: Defender

Youth career
- FC Brüttisellen

Senior career*
Years	Team	Apps	(Gls)
1999–2002	FC Winterthur	52	(5)
2002–2004	FC Wil	50	(0)
2004–2008	St. Gallen	73	(2)
2007–2008	→ FC Schaffhausen (loan)	47	(3)
2008–2011	Chievo	0	(0)
2008–2011	→ AC Lugano (loan)	29	(4)
2011–2015	St. Gallen	82	(6)

International career^{‡}
? – 2004	Switzerland U21		
- * Club domestic league appearances and goals as of 30 June 2015 ‡ National team caps and goals as of 28 July 2006

Philippe Montandon (born 15 July 1982) is a retired footballer from Switzerland who played as defender.
