= Stjepan Vuleta =

Swiss footballer (born 1993)

Personal information
- Full name: Stjepan Vuleta
- Date of birth: 29 October 1993 (age 33)
- Place of birth: Chur, Switzerland
- Height: 1.84 m (6 ft 0 in)
- Position: Forward

Youth career
- 2002—2005: Buchs
- 2005—2007: Schaan
- 2007–2010: Basel

Senior career*
Years	Team	Apps	(Gls)
2010–2012	Basel U-21	34	(15)
2012–2014	Basel	2	(0)
2013	→ Wil (loan)	14	(3)
2013–2014	→ Wacker Innsbruck (loan)	13	(2)
2014–2015	Wacker Innsbruck	7	(1)
2016–2018	Buchs		
2018–2020	Gossau	33	(10)
2020–2021	Eschen/Mauren	13	(9)

International career
2008–2009	Switzerland U16	6	(1)
2009–2010	Switzerland U17	11	(7)
2010–2011	Switzerland U18	10	(1)
2012	Switzerland U19	5	(0)
2012	Switzerland U20	1	(0)
2013	Switzerland U21	3	(1)
- * Club domestic league appearances and goals

Stjepan Vuleta (born 29 October 1993) is a retired Swiss professional footballer who played as a forward. Vuleta retired at the end of 2021 due to injuries.

His father Franjo Vuleta was emigrated from Bosnia and Herzegovina to Switzerland due to the Bosnian war.

== Career ==
=== Basel ===
Vuleta came through the ranks in Basel. He played in their U-16 team and was part of the team that won the Swiss Championship in 2008 and 2009. He then played in their U-18 team and again became Swiss U-18 champion, Vuleta played two years in the Basel U-21 team before he signed a three-year professional contract and joined their first team.

Vuleta made his official first team debut, playing in the starting eleven, in a UEFA Champions League preliminary stage match against Flora Tallinn on 24 July 2012, which Basel won 3–0. He played his Swiss Super League debut on 25 August 2012, as he was substituted in, during the 1–2 away defeat in the AFG Arena against St. Gallen.

=== Wil ===
On 5 February 2013, it was announced that Vuleta would be loaned out to Wil in the Challenge League to gain playing experience.

=== Wacker Innsbruck ===
On 9 July 2013, Vuleta joined the Austrian club FC Wacker Innsbruck on loan from FC Basel for one year.

=== International ===
Vuleta has played international football at various age levels, including Swiss under-16s, under-17s, under-19s, and under-21s. He played his debut on for the U-16 team 2 September 2008 in the 6–2 win against Bulgaria.

== Titles and honours ==
Basel

- Swiss Champion at U-16 level: 2007/08 and 2008/09
- Swiss Cup winner at U-16 level: 2007–08
- Swiss Champion at U-18 level: 2009/10
