= 2012–13 Swiss Super League =

116th season of top-tier Swiss football

Swiss Super League
- Season: 2012–13
- Dates: 14 July 2012 – 2 June 2013
- Champions: Basel; 16th title
- Relegated: Servette
- Champions League: Basel; Grasshopper
- Europa League: Zürich; St. Gallen; Thun
- Matches: 180
- Goals: 462 (2.57 per match)
- Top goalscorer: Ezequiel Scarione (21 goals)
- Biggest home win: St. Gallen 5–0 Sion (11 May 2013)
- Biggest away win: Thun 0–4 Zürich (10 March 2013); Luzern 0–4 Basel (1 April 2013); Sion 0–4 Grasshopper (16 May 2013)
- Highest scoring: Young Boys 6–2 Servette (30 September 2012)
- Highest attendance: 35,171; Basel 2–0 Lausanne-Sport (16 May 2013)
- Lowest attendance: 2,379; Servette 3–4 Luzern (1 June 2013)
- Average attendance: 12,019

The 2012–13 Swiss Super League, also known as the Raiffeisen Super League for sponsoring purposes, was the 116th season of top-tier football in Switzerland. It began on 14 July 2012 and ended on 2 June 2013. Basel successfully defended their title.

The league comprised the best eight sides from the 2011–12 season, the 2011–12 Swiss Challenge League champions FC St. Gallen, and FC Sion, the winners of the relegation/promotion play-off between the ninth-placed Super League team and the Challenge League runners-up.

Since Switzerland climbed from sixteenth to fourteenth place in the UEFA association coefficient rankings at the end of the 2011–12 season, the league regained its second spot for the UEFA Champions League. In other changes, the league abolished the relegation/promotion play-off from this season after a structural change at lower tiers of the Swiss football league pyramid.

== Teams ==
No team were relegated on competitive grounds at the end of the 2011–12 season after Neuchâtel Xamax were expelled from the league over financial irregularities midway through the campaign. The club went into administration soon afterwards and was eventually liquidated. Its successors Neuchâtel Xamax 1912 were subsequently inserted into the fifth-tier 2. Liga Interregional. Xamax were replaced by 2011–12 Challenge League champions FC St. Gallen, who immediately returned to the highest football league of Switzerland.

A further spot in the league was contested in a relegation/promotion playoff between ninth-placed FC Sion and Challenge League runners-up FC Aarau. Both teams played a two-legged series, which was won by Sion, 3–1 on aggregate. The club from Valais thus remained in the league despite having received a 36-point deduction for fielding ineligible players during the season.

=== Stadia and locations ===
Location of the 2012–13 Swiss Super League teams

Club	Location	Stadium	Capacity
Basel	Basel	St. Jakob-Park	38,512
Grasshopper	Zürich	Letzigrund	23,605
Lausanne-Sport	Lausanne	Stade Olympique de la Pontaise	15,850
Luzern	Lucerne	Swissporarena	17,500
Servette	Geneva	Stade de Genève	30,084
Sion	Sion	Stade Tourbillon	16,500
St. Gallen	St. Gallen	AFG Arena	19,694
Thun	Thun	Arena Thun	10,000
Young Boys	Bern	Stade de Suisse	31,783
Zürich	Zürich	Letzigrund	23,605

=== Personnel and kits ===
Team	Manager	Captain	Kit manufacturer	Shirt sponsor
Basel	(Switzerland) Murat Yakin	(Switzerland) Marco Streller	adidas	Novartis
Grasshopper	(Switzerland) Uli Forte	(Switzerland) Vero Salatić	Puma	FROMM/Feldmann Bau AG
Lausanne-Sport	(France) Laurent Roussey	(Spain) Gabri	adidas	Banque Cantonale Vaudoise
Luzern	(Argentina) Carlos Bernegger	(Switzerland) Florian Stahel	adidas	Otto's
Servette	(Switzerland) Sébastien Fournier	(Switzerland) Lionel Pizzinat	14fourteen	Journal GHI
Sion	(Switzerland) Michel Decastel	(Italy) Gennaro Gattuso	Erreà	Baldini Transports
St. Gallen	(Luxembourg) Jeff Saibene	(Switzerland) Philippe Montandon	Jako	St. Galler Kantonalbank
Thun	(Switzerland) Urs Fischer	(Switzerland) Roland Bättig	Erima	Panorama Center/Sky Work
Young Boys	(Switzerland) Bernard Challandes	(Switzerland) Marco Wölfli	Jako	Bauhaus
Zürich	(Switzerland) Urs Meier	(Switzerland) Philippe Koch	Nike	TalkEasy

== League table ==
Pos	Team	Pld	W	D	L	GF	GA	GD	Pts	Qualification or relegation
1	Basel (C)	36	21	9	6	61	31	+30	72	Qualification for the Champions League third qualifying round
2	Grasshopper	36	20	9	7	48	32	+16	69	Qualification for the Champions League third qualifying round
3	St. Gallen	36	17	8	11	54	36	+18	59	Qualification for the Europa League play-off round
4	Zürich	36	16	7	13	62	48	+14	55	Qualification for the Europa League third qualifying round
5	Thun	36	13	9	14	44	46	−2	48	Qualification for the Europa League second qualifying round
6	Sion	36	13	9	14	40	54	−14	48	
7	Young Boys	36	11	10	15	48	50	−2	43	
8	Luzern	36	10	12	14	41	52	−11	42	
9	Lausanne-Sport	36	8	9	19	32	51	−19	33	
10	Servette (R)	36	6	8	22	32	62	−30	26	Relegation to Swiss Challenge League

Source: Swiss Super League (in German)
Rules for classification: 1) points; 2) goal difference; 3) number of goals scored.
(C) Champions; (R) Relegated

== Results ==
=== First and Second Round ===
Home \ Away	BAS	GCZ	LS	LUZ	SER	SIO	STG	THU	YB	ZÜR
Basel		4–0	2–0	2–2	3–2	4–1	1–0	3–1	2–0	0–0
Grasshopper	2–2		1–1	2–0	1–0	0–2	1–0	1–0	3–2	1–0
Lausanne-Sport	1–1	0–2		1–0	5–1	0–2	0–1	3–0	2–1	0–2
Luzern	1–0	0–2	0–0		1–1	0–3	1–1	2–1	1–2	1–1
Servette	0–1	2–0	0–1	0–2		0–2	1–1	0–0	1–1	1–1
Sion	1–1	1–1	1–1	3–2	1–0		0–3	2–1	1–0	2–2
St. Gallen	2–1	1–1	2–1	1–1	2–0	0–3		1–0	1–1	3–1
Thun	3–2	2–3	0–0	2–1	3–0	1–1	0–1		2–1	1–4
Young Boys	1–1	0–1	0–0	2–1	6–2	3–1	0–0	3–0		4–1
Zürich	1–2	0–1	4–0	0–2	0–2	1–0	0–2	0–2	1–1	

Source: Swiss Super League
Legend: Blue = home team win; Yellow = draw; Red = away team win.

=== Third and Fourth Round ===
Home \ Away	BAS	GCZ	LS	LUZ	SER	SIO	STG	THU	YB	ZÜR
Basel		0–0	2–0	0–3	2–0	3–0	1–0	1–0	3–0	3–1
Grasshopper	1–0		4–1	0–0	2–0	1–1	3–1	0–2	2–0	0–1
Lausanne-Sport	1–2	0–0		3–0	3–0	1–3	1–3	2–4	0–0	1–1
Luzern	0–4	1–1	1–0		1–1	2–0	2–0	0–0	3–1	1–1
Servette	1–2	0–1	1–0	3–4		4–0	1–3	2–0	0–1	1–2
Sion	0–1	0–4	0–1	2–1	1–1		1–0	0–1	0–0	4–2
St. Gallen	1–1	1–2	3–1	4–0	4–1	5–0		0–0	3–1	1–2
Thun	2–2	1–0	2–0	1–1	1–1	4–0	3–0		2–2	0–4
Young Boys	0–1	4–0	3–1	3–2	0–2	0–0	2–0	1–2		2–4
Zürich	3–1	2–4	2–0	4–1	4–0	3–1	1–3	2–0	4–0	

Source: Swiss Super League
Legend: Blue = home team win; Yellow = draw; Red = away team win.

== Season statistics ==
=== Top scorers ===
Rank	Player	Club	Goals
1	(Argentina) Ezequiel Scarione	St. Gallen	21
2	(Switzerland) Marco Streller	Basel	14
3	(Switzerland) Josip Drmić	Zürich	13
3	(Switzerland) Marco Schneuwly	Thun	13
5	(Equatorial Guinea) Anatole Ngamukol	Grasshopper / Thun	12
6	(Tunisia) Amine Chermiti	Zürich	10
7	(Switzerland) Mario Gavranović	Zürich	9
7	(Switzerland) Raphael Nuzzolo	Young Boys	9
9	(Switzerland) Izet Hajrović	Grasshopper	8
9	(Brazil) Léo Itaperuna	Sion	8
9	(Republic of the Congo) Chris Malonga	Lausanne-Sport	8

== Awards ==
=== Annual awards ===
Award	Winner	Club
Raiffeisen Super League Best Player	(Egypt) Mohamed Salah	Basel
Swiss Football League Best Youngster	(Switzerland) Michael Frey	Young Boys
Swiss Football League Best Coach	(Switzerland) Murat Yakin	Basel
Swiss Football League Best Goal	(Switzerland) Sven Lüscher	Aarau
RSL Dream Team	See Team of the Season	
Raiffeisen Super League «Mon joueur»	(Egypt) Mohamed Salah	Basel

=== Team of the Season ===
Raiffeisen Super League Dream Team 2013
Goalkeeper	(Switzerland) Yann Sommer (Basel)			
Defenders	(Switzerland) Kay Voser (Basel)	(Montenegro) Milan Vilotić (Grasshoppers)	(Switzerland) Fabian Schär (Basel)	(Switzerland) Michael Lang (Grasshoppers)
Midfielders	(Switzerland) Valentin Stocker (Basel)	(Switzerland) Fabian Frei (Basel)	(Switzerland) Vero Salatić (Grasshoppers)	(Egypt) Mohamed Salah (Basel)
Forwards	(Venezuela) Josef Martínez (Thun)		(Switzerland) Marco Streller (Basel)	

== Attendances ==
#	Football club	Home games	Average attendance
1	FC Basel	18	29,036
2	BSC Young Boys	18	17,242
3	FC St. Gallen	18	14,310
4	FC Luzern	18	12,410
5	FC Zürich	18	10,740
6	FC Sion	18	10,150
7	Grasshopper Club Zürich	18	8,600
8	Servette FC	18	6,666
9	FC Lausanne-Sport	18	5,733
10	FC Thun	18	5,328
