= 2011–12 FC Thun season =

FC Thun
2011–12 season
- Chairman: Markus Stähli
- Manager: Bernard Challandes
- Swiss Cup: Round 2
- UEFA Europa League: Play-off round

This article covers the results and statistics of FC Thun during the 2011–12 season. During the season Thun will compete in the Swiss Super League, Swiss Cup and in the UEFA Europa League.

== Match results ==
=== Legend ===
Win	Draw	Loss

=== Swiss Super League ===
17 July 2011 Match 1	Servette	1 – 2	Thun	Geneva
	Routis 30'	Report	C Schneuwly 2'; Lustrinelli 9'	Stadium: Stade de Genève; Attendance: 6,712

24 July 2011 Match 2	Thun	3 – 0	Grasshopper Club Zürich	Thun
	Andrist 43' 50'; C Schneuwly 58'	Report		Stadium: Arena Thun; Attendance: 6,839

31 July 2011 Match 3	Luzern	0 – 0	Thun	Lucerne
		Report		Stadium: Swissporarena; Attendance: 17,000

7 August 2011 Match 4	Thun	0 – 0	Neuchâtel Xamax	Thun
		Report		Stadium: Arena Thun; Attendance: 5,963

14 August 2011 Match 5	Thun	5 – 2	Lausanne-Sport	Thun
	Lustrinelli 6' 63'; C Schneuwly 14'; Andrist 46'; Wittwer 86'	Report	Lang 25'; Moussilou 48'	Stadium: Arena Thun; Attendance: 5,963

21 August 2011 Match 6	Young Boys	0 – 2	Thun	Bern
		Report	Lezcano 6' (pen.); Andrist 86'	Stadium: Stade de Suisse; Attendance: 26,834

28 August 2011 Match 7	Basel	2 – 1	Thun	Basel
	A Frei 13'; F Frei 49'	Report	Lustrinelli 69'	Stadium: St. Jakob-Park; Attendance: 29,334

11 September 2011 Match 8	Thun	0 – 3	Sion	Thun
		Report	Sio 12' 45'; Mutsch 90'	Stadium: Arena Thun; Attendance: 5,822

21 September 2011 Match 9	Zürich	0 – 0	Thun	Zürich
		Report		Stadium: Letzigrund; Attendance: 7,400

24 September 2011 Match 10	Thun	1 – 1	Basel	Thun
	Rama 81'	Report	Streller 72'	Stadium: Arena Thun; Attendance: 7,801

1 October 2011 Match 11	Neuchâtel Xamax	4 – 0	Thun	Neuchâtel
	Arizmendi 26'; Tréand 35'; Wüthrich 64'; Paíto 82'	Report		Stadium: Stade de la Maladière; Attendance: 2,132

22 October 2011 Match 12	Lausanne-Sport	1 – 0	Thun	Lausanne
	Schirinzi 20' (o.g.)	Report		Stadium: Stade Olympique de la Pontaise; Attendance: 3,650

26 October 2011 Match 13	Thun	0 – 2	Zürich	Thun
		Report	Alphonse 17'; Rodríguez 90+4' (pen.)	Stadium: Arena Thun; Attendance: 4,865

29 October 2011 Match 14	Sion	2 – 0	Thun	Sion
	Vanczák 55'; Mrđa 74'	Report		Stadium: Stade Tourbillon; Attendance: 9,300

5 November 2011 Match 15	Thun	3 – 1	Luzern	Thun
	Schirinzi 49', 90+1'; Rama 87'	Report	Yakin 56' (pen.)	Stadium: Arena Thun; Attendance: 6,619

19 November 2011 Match 16	Thun	3 – 0	Servette	Thun
	Diallo 4' (o.g.); Hediger 58'; Rama 68'	Report		Stadium: Arena Thun; Attendance: 5,070

4 December 2011 Match 17	Grasshopper Club Zürich	1 – 0	Thun	Zürich
	Zuber 90'	Report		Stadium: Letzigrund; Attendance: 4,100

10 December 2011 Match 18	Thun	1 – 1	Young Boys	Thun
	C Schneuwly 10'	Report	Ben Khalifa 27'	Stadium: Arena Thun; Attendance: 10,000

5 February 2012 Match 19	Grasshopper Club Zürich	0 – 1	Thun	Zürich
		Report	M Schneuwly 45+2'	Stadium: Letzigrund; Attendance: 2,500

11 February 2012 Match 20	Thun	1 – 1	Luzern	Thun
	M Schneuwly 72'	Report	Siegrist 76'	Stadium: Arena Thun; Attendance: 3,872

18 February 2012 Match 21	Zürich	1 – 1	Thun	Zürich
	Henrique 38'	report	M Schneuwly 67'	Stadium: Letzigrund; Attendance: 10,000

3 March 2012 Match 22	Thun	1 – 0	Servette	Thun
	C Schneuwly 61'	Report		Stadium: Arena Thun; Attendance: 4,611

10 March 2012 Match 23	Sion	1 – 0	Thun	Sion
	Danilo 30'	Report		Stadium: Stade Tourbillon; Attendance: 8,800

18 March 2012 Match 24	Thun	2 – 0	Lausanne-Sport	Thun
	C Schneuwly 14', 56'	Report		Stadium: Arena Thun; Attendance: 4,167

25 March 2012 Match 25	Young Boys	4 – 0	Thun	Bern
	Spycher 31'; Bobadilla 43'; Degan 81'; Mayuka 90+1'			Stadium: Stade de Suisse; Attendance: 23,736

31 March 2012 Match 26	Thun	2 – 3	Basel	Thun
	Matić 9' (pen.); Sommer 79' (o.g.)	Report	Streller 6'; Stocker 42'; Frei 59'	Stadium: Arena Thun; Attendance: 7,624; Referee: Sascha Amhof

9 April 2012 Match 27	Servette	0 – 2	Thun	Geneva
		Report	C Schneuwly 3'; M Schneuwly 77'	Stadium: Stade de Genève; Attendance: 8,323

14 April 2012 Match 28	Lausanne-Sport	1 – 0	Thun	Lausanne
	Lang 45'	Report		Stadium: Stade Olympique de la Pontaise; Attendance: 4,250

21 April 2012 Match 29	Thun	0 – 0	Grasshopper Club Zürich	Thun
		Report		Stadium: Arena Thun; Attendance: 5,122; Referee: Ludovic Gremaud

29 April 2012 Match 30	Thun	1 – 1	Sion	Thun
	Aislan 69' (o.g.)	Report	Ianu 30'	Stadium: Arena Thun; Attendance: 5,703; Referee: Sascha Kever

2 May 2012 Match 31	Basel	2 – 1	Thun	Basel
19:45	Andrist 16'; Kováč (yellow card) 59'; Yapi (yellow card) 62'; A. Frei (yellow card) 64' (goal) 70' (pen.)	(Report) (in German)	45+1' (o.g.) Park; (yellow card) 54' Bigler; (yellow card) 69' Da Costa	Stadium: St. Jakob-Park; Attendance: 26,561; Referee: Patrick Graf

13 May 2012 Match 32	Thun	2 – 2	Young Boys	Thun
	Schneuwly 10'; Schindelholz (yellow card) 24'; Wittwer 37'; Bättig (yellow card) 63'; Ghezal (yellow card) 76'; Manière (yellow card) 90'	Report	Mayuka 30' (yellow card) 56'; Spycher 77' (pen.)	Stadium: Arena Thun; Attendance: 9,118

20 May 2012 Match 33	Luzern	0 – 1	Thun	Lucerne
	Stahel (yellow card) 36'	Report	Schindelholz (yellow card) 58'; Schirinzi 72'	Stadium: Swissporarena; Attendance: 12,184

23 May 2012 Match 34	Thun	2 – 4	Zürich	Thun
	Schneuwly 58' (yellow card) 82'; Ardit Zenuni 79'	Report	Kukuruzović 50'; Benito (yellow card) 58'; Drmić 67', 82', 90+1'; Kajević (yellow card) 90+4'	Stadium: Arena Thun; Attendance: 4,798

=== Swiss Cup ===
17 September 2011 Round 1	Stade Lausanne-Ouchy	0 – 5	Thun	Lausanne-Ouchy
		Report	Lustrinelli 4' (pen.); Demiri 34'; Schneuwly 60'; Lezcano 74'; Wittwer 87'	Stadium: Stade Lausanne-Ouchy; Attendance: 560

16 October 2011 Round 2	St. Gallen	2 – 0	Thun	St. Gallen
	Bättig 39' (o.g.); Valente 76'	Report		Stadium: AFG Arena; Attendance: 7,023

=== UEFA Europa League ===
==== Second qualifying round ====
14 July 2011 1st leg	Vllaznia Shkodër (Albania)	0 – 0	Thun (Switzerland)	Shkodër
		Report		Stadium: Loro Boriçi Stadium; Attendance: 6,000

21 July 2011 2nd leg	Thun (Switzerland)	2 – 1	Vllaznia Shkodër (Albania)	Thun
	Rama 89'; Lüthi 90+4'	Report	Sukaj 14'	Stadium: Arena Thun; Attendance: 7,193

Thun won 2–1 on aggregate

==== Third qualifying round ====
28 July 2011 1st leg	Palermo (Italy)	2 – 2	Thun (Switzerland)	Palermo
	Iličić 13'; Miccoli 90+3'	Report	Lüthi 6'; Marc Schneider 56'	Stadium: Stadio Renzo Barbera; Attendance: 28,760

4 August 2011 2nd leg	Thun (Switzerland)	1 – 1	Palermo (Italy)	Thun
	Lezcano 65'	Report	González 49'	Stadium: Arena Thun; Attendance: 7,227

Thun win on away goals rule

==== Play-off round ====
18 August 2011 1st leg	Thun (Switzerland)	0 – 1	Stoke City (England)	Thun
		Report	Pugh 18'	Stadium: Arena Thun; Attendance: 7,150

25 August 2011 2nd leg	Stoke City (England)	4 – 1	Thun (Switzerland)	Stoke-on-Trent
	Upson 24'; Jones 31' 72'; Whelan 38'	Report	Wittwer 78'	Stadium: Britannia Stadium; Attendance: 24,118

Thun lost 5–1 on aggregate

== Squad statistics ==
Appearances for competitive matches only

No.	Pos.	Name	League		Cup		Europe		Total	
No.	Pos.	Name	Apps	Goals	Apps	Goals	Apps	Goals	Apps	Goals
1	GK	(Switzerland) David Da Costa	28	0	2	0	5	0	35	0
4	DF	(Switzerland) Michael Siegfried	0(2)	0	0(1)	0	0	0	0(3)	0
5	DF	(Tunisia) Saïf Ghezal	15	0	2	0	1	0	19	0
6	DF	(Switzerland) Roland Bättig	21	0	2	0	6	0	29	0
7	MF	(Switzerland) Stephan Andrist	5(2)	4	0	0	4(2)	0	10(3)	4
8	MF	(North Macedonia) Muhamed Demiri	22(3)	0	2	1	6	0	30(3)	1
9	FW	(Switzerland) Milaim Rama	4(12)	3	0(1)	0	1(3)	1	5(16)	4
11	FW	(Brazil) Fabiano	1(4)	0	0	0	0	0	1(4)	0
13	MF	(Ivory Coast) Sekou Sanogo Junior	2(6)	0	0	0	2(3)	0	4(9)	0
14	DF	(Switzerland) Nicolas Schindelholz	11	0	0	0	6	0	17	0
15	FW	(Switzerland) Marco Schneuwly	8	4	0	0	0	0	8	4
16	FW	(Switzerland) Mauro Lustrinelli	15(2)	4	2	1	3(1)	0	19(3)	5
17	MF	(Switzerland) Dennis Hediger	25(1)	1	2	0	0(3)	0	27(4)	1
19	MF	(Albania) Mirson Volina	3(13)	0	0(2)	0	0	0	3(15)	0
20	MF	(Switzerland) Christian Schneuwly	25	8	1	1	4(1)	0	30(1)	9
21	FW	(Paraguay) Dario Lezcano	16(1)	1	2	1	6	1	24(1)	3
22	GK	(Switzerland) David Moser	0	0	0	0	0	0	0	0
23	DF	(Switzerland) Marc Schneider	12(2)	0	0	0	4	1	16(2)	1
24	DF	(Croatia) Stipe Matić	22	1	1	0	5	0	28	1
25	MF	(Switzerland) Kevin Bigler	13(2)	0	0	0	0	0	13(2)	0
26	DF	(Switzerland) Thomas Reinmann	12(3)	0	1(1)	0	4(1)	0	17(5)	0
27	MF	(Italy) Enrico Schirinzi	19	2	2	0	0	0	21	2
28	MF	(Switzerland) Andreas Wittwer	12(10)	1	1(1)	1	3(3)	1	16(14)	3
29	MF	(Switzerland) Jérémy Manière	1(4)	0	0	0	0	0	1(4)	0
30	MF	(Germany) Ifet Taljević	4(1)	0	0	0	0	0	4(1)	0
31	MF	(North Macedonia) Gentjan Zuta	0	0	0	0	0	0	0	0
32	MF	(France) Mathieu Salamand	2(6)	0	0	0	0	0	2(6)	0
33	DF	(Switzerland) Benjamin Lüthi	9(1)	0	2	0	5(1)	2	16(2)	2
35	GK	(Switzerland) Dragan Đukić	0	0	0	0	1	0	1	0

== Transfers ==
=== In ===
Pos.	Name	From
FW	(Switzerland) Mauro Lustrinelli	(Switzerland) AC Bellinzona
MF	(Switzerland) Christian Schneuwly	(Switzerland) Young Boys
FW	(Switzerland) Marco Schneuwly	(Switzerland) Young Boys
DF	(Tunisia) Saïf Ghezal	(Tunisia) Étoile Sportive du Sahel
FW	(Brazil) Fabiano Vieira Soares	(Brazil) Villa Nova Atlético Clube

=== Out ===
Pos.	Name	To
MF	(Switzerland) Stephan Andrist	(Switzerland) Basel
FW	(Paraguay) Dario Lezcano	(Switzerland) Luzern
MF	(Germany) Ifet Taljević	Released
FW	(Switzerland) Mauro Lustrinelli	Retired
