= 2012–13 FC Thun season =

FC Thun
2011–12 season
- Chairman: Markus Stähli
- Manager: Bernard Challandes
- Swiss Super League: 5th
- Swiss Cup: Quarter-final

This article covers the results and statistics of FC Thun during the 2012–13 season. During the season Thun will compete in the Swiss Super League and in the Swiss Cup.

== Match results ==
=== Legend ===
Win	Draw	Loss

=== Swiss Super League ===
==== League results and fixtures ====
14 July 2012 Round 1	Thun	0 – 0	Lausanne-Sport	Thun
		Report		Stadium: Arena Thun

22 July 2012 Round 2	Zürich	0 – 2	Thun	Zürich
	Pedro Henrique (yellow card) 31'	Report	Demiri 39' (yellow card) 64'; Lüthi (yellow card) 58'; Ngamukol 90' (yellow card) 90'	Stadium: Letzigrund

22 July 2012 Round 3	Young Boys	3 – 0	Thun	Bern
	Schneuwly 31'; Spycher 34' (pen.); Mayuka 54'	Report		Stadium: Stade de Suisse

5 August 2012 Round 4	Thun	2 – 1	Luzern	Thun
	Cassio 25'; Schirinzi 47'	Report	Gygax 74'	Stadium: Arena Thun; Attendance: 5,524

12 August 2012 Round 5	Basel	3 – 1	FC Thun	St. Jakob-Park, Basel
16:00	Streller 9' (pen.), 31'; Stocker 42'	Report	(red card) 22' Faivre; 35' Schirinzi	Attendance: 27,422; Referee: Stephan Klossner

18 August 2012 Round 6	Thun	0 – 1	St. Gallen	Thun
		Report	Scarione 75' (pen.)	Stadium: Arena Thun; Attendance: 5,646

25 August 2012 Round 7	Grasshopper Club Zürich	1 – 0	Thun	Zürich
19:45	Vilotić (yellow card) 39'; Hajrović 44'	Report	(yellow card) 31' Ghezal; (yellow card) 60' Ferreira; (yellow card) 67' Hediger	Stadium: Letzigrund; Attendance: 4,950; Referee: Nikolaj Hänni

2 September 2012 Round 8	Thun	3 – 0	Servette	Thun
	Schneuwly 7'; Ferreira 67'; Ngamukol 90'	Report		Stadium: Arena Thun; Attendance: 5,069

22 September 2012 Round 9	Sion	2 – 1	Thun	Sion
	Itaperuna 14', 61'	Report	Ngamukol 42'	Stadium: Stade Tourbillon; Attendance: 5,800

27 September 2012 Round 10	Thun	2 – 1	Young Boys	Thun
	Ngamukol 72'; Salamand 87'	Report	Nuzzolo 68'	Stadium: Arena Thun; Attendance: 7,022

30 September 2012 Round 11	Luzern	2 – 1	Thun	Lucerne
	Winter 5'; Andrist 82'	Report	Schirinzi 90'	Stadium: Swissporarena; Attendance: 10,477

6 October 2012 Round 12	Thun	2 – 3	Grasshopper Club Zürich	Thun
19:45	Steffen 30'; Schneuwly 64', (yellow card) 72'	(Report) (in German)	50' Zuber; 56' Ben Khalifa; 58' Toko	Stadium: Arena Thun; Attendance: 5'127; Referee: Pascal Erlachner

20 October 2012 Round 13	Thun	1 - 1	Sion	Thun
19:45 CEST (UTC+2)	Ghezal 44'	Summary	Margairaz 85'	Stadium: Arena Thun; Attendance: 5,148; Referee: Sebastien Pache

4 November 2012 Round 15	FC Thun	1 - 4	Zürich	Thun
13:45	Bättig (yellow card) 8'; Renato Steffen (yellow card) 65'; Hediger (yellow card) 70'; Schneuwly 89'	Summary	Jorge Teixeira 15' (yellow card) 84'; Jahović 28' (yellow card) 66'; Kukuruzović 46', 77'	Stadium: Arena Thun; Attendance: 5,932; Referee: (Switzerland) Adrien Jaccottet (Basel)

24 November 2012 Round 17	Thun	3 – 2	Basel	Arena Thun, Thun
16:00	Ngamukol 5', 88'; Wittwer 64'; Hediger (yellow card) 91'; Faivre (yellow card) 93'	(FCB Report) (in German)	32' F. Frei; 39' Streller; (yellow card) 91' Cabral	Attendance: 7,042; Referee: Stephan Studer

24 February 2013 Round 21	Thun	4 - 0	Sion	Thun
13:45 CET (UTC+1)	Salamand 8'; Ferreira 10'; Schneuwly 35'; Sadik 74'	Summary		Stadium: Arena Thun; Attendance: 4,374; Referee: Sascha Kever

16 March 2013 Round 24	Basel	1 – 0	Thun	St. Jakob-Park, Basel
13:45	Zoua (yellow card) 36'; Dragović (yellow card) 78'; Streller 81'; Park (yellow card) 88'	(FCB Report) (in German)	(yellow card) 40' Krstić; (yellow card) 82' Demiri	Attendance: 25,440; Referee: Nikolaj Hänni

30 March 2013 Round 25	Thun	1 - 0	Grasshopper Club Zürich	Thun
19:45	Schneuwly 34'; Bättig (yellow card) 55'	(GC Report) (in German)	(yellow card) 17' T. Xhaka	Stadium: Arena Thun; Attendance: 5'084; Referee: Sascha Kever

21 April 2013 Round 28	Thun	2 – 2	Basel	Arena Thun, Thun
13:45	Demiri 60'; Zuffi 70'	(FCB Report) (in German)	25' Park; 65' Díaz; (yellow card) 69' Schär	Attendance: 5,791; Referee: Sébastien Pache

27 April 2013 Round 29	Grasshopper Club Zürich	0 - 2	Thun	Zürich
19:45	Grichting (yellow card) 76'; Bauer (yellow card) 80'	(GC Report) (in German)	35' Steffen; (yellow card) 38' Schindelholz; (yellow card) 56' Bättig; 64' Schneuwly	Stadium: Letzigrund; Attendance: 4,100; Referee: Pascal Erlachner

25 May 2013 Round 34	Sion	0 - 1	Thun	Sion
17:45 CEST (UTC+2)	André Marques (yellow card) 55' (yellow-red card) 83'	Summary	Schneuwly 58'	Stadium: Stade Tourbillon; Attendance: 8,200; Referee: Nikolaj Hänni

=== Swiss Cup ===
15 September 2012 Round 1	Düdingen	3 – 4	Thun	Düdingen
		Report		Stadium: Stadion Birchhölzli
