= 2012–13 BSC Young Boys season =

BSC Young Boys
2012–13 season
- Stadium: Stade de Suisse, Bern, Switzerland
- Swiss Cup: Entering into 1st Round
- Europa League: 3rd qualifying round

The 2012–13 BSC Young Boys season is the 115th season in club history.

== Matches ==
=== Legend ===
Win Draw Loss Postponed

=== Friendly matches ===
==== Preseason ====
2 July 2012	BSC Young Boys	3 – 0	FC Wil	Utzenstorf
19:00 CEST	Ojala 60'; Mayuka 63'; Frey 72'	Match Report (in German)		Stadium: Weissenstein; Attendance: 1,300; Referee: Patrick Graf

4 July 2012	BSC Young Boys (Switzerland)	3 – 4	(Ukraine) Shakhtar Donetsk	Köniz
19:00 CEST	Mayuka 19'; Spycher 40' (pen.); Bobadilla 71'	Match Report (in German)	11', 40', 45' Willian; 28' Eduardo	Stadium: Liebefeld-Hessgut; Attendance: 2,200; Referee: Patrick Graf

7 July 2012	BSC Young Boys (Switzerland)	1 – 1	(Germany) 1860 München	Köniz
17:00 CEST	Frey 85'	Match Report (in German)	77' Aygün	Stadium: Liebefeld-Hessgut; Attendance: 2,950; Referee: Stephan Klossner

==== Friendlies (fall) ====
11 September 2012	FC Breitenrain (Switzerland)	1 – 6	(Switzerland) BSC Young Boys	Bern
18:00 CEST	Maksimović 10'	Match Report (in German)	43' Sutter; 72' Vitkieviez; 74', 75', 82' Tabakovic; 84' Nuzzolo	Stadium: Spitalacker; Attendance: 1,000; Referee: Alain Bieri

==== Winter break ====
15 January 2013	FC Thun (Switzerland)	0 – 1	(Switzerland) BSC Young Boys	Thun
15:00 CET		Match Report (in German)	36' Afum	Stadium: Arena Thun; Attendance: 724; Referee: Pascal Erlachner

21 January 2013	BSC Young Boys (Switzerland)	0 – 1	(Ukraine) Dnipro Dnipropetrovsk	La Cala de Mijas, Spain
16:00 CET		Match Report (in German)	42' (pen.) Seleznyov	Stadium: La Cala Golf Resort; Attendance: 50; Referee: Lee Dong Jun (South Korea)

23 January 2013	UD Marbella (Spain)	0 – 6	(Switzerland) BSC Young Boys	La Cala de Mijas, Spain
16:00 CET		Match Report (in German)	40' Frey; 48' Tabaković; 70' (pen.) Costanzo; 79' Fekete; 84' Ojala; 89' Sessolo	Stadium: La Cala Golf Resort; Attendance: 70; Referee: Aro Sa (South Korea)

25 January 2013	BSC Young Boys (Switzerland)	1 – 1	(Romania) CFR Cluj	La Cala de Mijas, Spain
16:00 CET	Maah 26'	Match Report (in German)	57' Nuzzolo	Stadium: La Cala Golf Resort; Attendance: 70; Referee: Lee Dong Jun (South Korea)

29 January 2013	FC Wohlen (Switzerland)	2 – 1	(Switzerland) BSC Young Boys	Wohlen AG
15:00 CET	Ianu 65'; Milani 82'	Match Report (in German)	25' González	Stadium: Stadion Niedermatten; Attendance: 300; Referee: Fedayi San

3 February 2013	FC Winterthur (Switzerland)	0 – 2	(Switzerland) BSC Young Boys	Winterthur
14:00 CET		Match Report (in German)	42' Afum; 80' Frey	Stadium: Hegmatten; Attendance: 500; Referee: Alain Bieri

==== Friendlies (spring) ====
26 March 2013	SC Düdingen (Switzerland)	v	(Switzerland) BSC Young Boys	Düdingen
18:00 CET				Stadium: Stadion Birchhölzli

=== Super League ===
Kickoff times are in CET

==== League fixtures and results ====
15 July 2012 1	FC St. Gallen	1 – 1	BSC Young Boys	St. Gallen
16:00	Abegglen 21'	Match Report (in German)	21' Mayuka	Stadium: AFG Arena; Attendance: 12,893; Referee: Stephan Studer

22 July 2012 2	BSC Young Boys	0 – 1	Grasshopper Club Zürich	Bern
13:45		Match Report (in German)	84' Salatić	Stadium: Stade de Suisse; Attendance: 18,711; Referee: Damien Carrel

29 July 2012 3	BSC Young Boys	3 – 0	FC Thun	Bern
13:45	C. Schneuwly 31'; Spycher 34' (pen.); Mayuka 55'	Match Report (in German)		Stadium: Stade de Suisse; Attendance: 22,212; Referee: Ludovic Gremaud

5 August 2012 4	Servette FC	1 – 1	BSC Young Boys	Lancy
16:00	Karanović 41' (pen.); Grippo (yellow card) 90+1' (red card)	Match Report	25' Farnerud	Stadium: Stade de Genève; Attendance: 4,819; Referee: Daniel Wermelinger

12 August 2012 5	BSC Young Boys	4 – 1	FC Zürich	Bern
13:45	Bobadilla 28', 36'; Farnerud 54'; Nuzzolo 69'	Match Report	44' Drmić; (red card) 76' Kukeli; (red card) 82' Pedro Henrique	Stadium: Stade de Suisse; Attendance: 18,160; Referee: Adrien Jaccottet

19 August 2012 6	FC Sion	1 – 0	BSC Young Boys	Sion
13:45	Crettenand 23'	Match Report	(red card) 22' Costanzo	Stadium: Stade Tourbillon; Attendance: 13,500; Referee: Sascha Kever

26 August 2012 7	BSC Young Boys	0 – 0	FC Lausanne-Sport	Bern
16:00		Match Report		Stadium: Stade de Suisse; Attendance: 17,132; Referee: Damien Carrel

2 September 2012 8	FC Luzern	1 – 2	BSC Young Boys	Lucerne
13:45	Puljić 85'	Match Report	19' Farnerud; 62' González	Stadium: Swissporarena; Attendance: 13,000; Referee: Stephan Klossner

23 September 2012 9	BSC Young Boys	1 – 1	FC Basel	Bern
16:15	Zárate 50'	Match Report (in German)	74' Streller	Stadium: Stade de Suisse; Attendance: 22,757; Referee: Stephan Studer

27 September 2012 10	FC Thun	2 – 1	BSC Young Boys	Thun
19:45	Ngamukol 72'; Salamand 87'	Match Report (in German)	68' Nuzzolo	Stadium: Arena Thun; Attendance: 7,022; Referee: Damien Carrel

30 September 2012 11	BSC Young Boys	6 – 2	Servette FC	Bern
13:45	Nuzzolo 3'; Frey 25'; Bobadilla 38', 54'; Costanzo 69'; Lecjaks 81'	Match Report (in German)	72' Pont; 90+2' Kouassi	Stadium: Stade de Suisse; Attendance: 16,404; Referee: Sascha Amhof

7 October 2012 12	FC Zürich	1 – 1	BSC Young Boys	Zürich
13:45	Schönbächler 30'	Match Report (in German)	75' (pen.) Costanzo	Stadium: Letzigrund; Attendance: 10,073; Referee: Adrien Jaccottet

21 October 2012 13	Grasshopper Club Zürich	3 – 2	BSC Young Boys	Zürich
16:00	Hajrović 17', 30'; Zuber 45'	(Report) (in German)	50' Martínez; 90' Bobadilla	Stadium: Letzigrund; Attendance: 11,900; Referee: Damien Carrel

27 October 2012 14	BSC Young Boys	Postponed	FC Luzern	Bern
19:45				Stadium: Stade de Suisse

3 November 2012 15	FC Basel	2 – 0	BSC Young Boys	Basel
19:45	Yapi 27'; Streller 39'	(Report) (in German)		Stadium: St. Jakob-Park; Attendance: 30,057; Referee: Nikolaj Hänni

18 November 2012 16	BSC Young Boys	0 – 0	FC St. Gallen	Bern
13:45	Raimondi (red card) 36'	(Report) (in German)		Stadium: Stade de Suisse; Attendance: 19,904; Referee: Adrien Jaccottet

25 November 2012 17	FC Lausanne-Sport	2 – 1	BSC Young Boys	Lausanne
13:45	Gabri 17'; Malonga 72'	(Report) (in German)	(red card) 60' Bobadilla; 83' Frey	Stadium: Stade Olympique de la Pontaise; Attendance: 7,200; Referee: Sascha Kever

28 November 2012 14	BSC Young Boys	2 – 1	FC Luzern	Bern
20:15	Farnerud 21'; Zárate 45+1'	(Report) (in German)	16' (o.g.) Sutter	Stadium: Stade de Suisse; Attendance: 16,537; Referee: Stephan Klossner

2 December 2012 18	BSC Young Boys	3 – 1	FC Sion	Bern
23:45	Ojala (red card) 27'; Nef 45+2'; Nuzzolo 78' (pen.), 90+3'	(Report) (in German)	29' Dingsdag	Stadium: Stade de Suisse; Attendance: 17,737; Referee: Nikolaj Hänni

9 February 2013 19	BSC Young Boys	3 – 2	FC Luzern	Bern
19:45	Costanzo 28', 38'; Nef (red card) 49'; Nuzzolo 90+1'	(Report) (in German)	50' Mouangue; 72' Wiss	Stadium: Stade de Suisse; Attendance: 14,597; Referee: Nikolaj Hänni

16 February 2013 20	Grasshopper Club Zürich	2 – 0	BSC Young Boys	Zürich
19:45	Abrashi (yellow card) 12'; Anatole 26', 79'; Grichting (yellow card) 56'	(Report) (in German)	(yellow card) 13' M. Bürki; (yellow card) 43' Affolter; (yellow card) 65' Zverotić	Stadium: Letzigrund; Attendance: 5,200; Referee: Stephan Klossner

23 February 2013 21	FC Zürich	4 – 0	BSC Young Boys	Zürich
19:45	Drmić 17'; Chermiti 47'; Gavranović 67'; Jahović 79'	(Report) (in German)		Stadium: Letzigrund; Attendance: 8,599; Referee: Sébastien Pache

3 March 2013 22	BSC Young Boys	2 – 0	FC St. Gallen	Bern
13:45	Frey 55'; Nuzzolo 79'	(Report) (in German)		Stadium: Stade de Suisse; Attendance: 15,192; Referee: Adrien Jaccottet

10 March 2013 Round 23	Basel	3 – 0	Young Boys	St. Jakob-Park, Basel
16:00	A. Frei 37'; Cabral (yellow card) 41'; Streller 62'; Schär 85'	(FCB Report) (in German)	(yellow card) 84' Doubai	Attendance: 27,818; Referee: Sascha Kever

17 March 2013 Round 24	Young Boys	0 - 0	Sion	Bern
13:45 CET (UTC+1)		Summary		Stadium: Stade de Suisse; Attendance: 15,173; Referee: Sascha Amhof

21 April 2013 Round 28	Sion	0 - 0	Young Boys	Sion
16:00 CEST (UTC+2)		Summary		Stadium: Stade Tourbillon; Attendance: 9,100; Referee: Adrien Jaccottet (Basel)

7 May 2013 Round 31	BSC Young Boys	4 - 0	Grasshopper Club Zürich	Bern
19:45	Spycher (yellow card) 27'; Afum 33'; Costanzo (yellow card) 34'; C. Schneuwly (yellow card) 52'; Farnerud 62'; Nuzzolo 70'; Gerndt 90+3'	(Report) (in German)	(yellow card) 27' (yellow card) 57' (red card) Vilotić; (yellow card) 52' Salatić; (yellow card) 90+3' Anatole	Stadium: Stade de Suisse; Attendance: 15'069; Referee: Sébastien Pache

29 May 2013 Round 35	Young Boys	0 - 1	Basel	Stade de Suisse, Bern
	Veškovac (yellow card) 55'; Bürki (yellow card) 72' (red card) 73'; Nef (yellow card) 88'	(Report) (in German)	55' (pen.) (yellow card) 55' F. Frei; (yellow card) 60' Stocker	Attendance: 19,322; Referee: Sascha Kever

=== Swiss Cup ===
Kickoff times are in CET

15 September 2012 1st Round	FC Wettswil-Bonstetten	1 – 5	BSC Young Boys	Wettswil
16:00	Buchmann 36'	Match Report (in German)	3', 34' Bobadilla; 31', 88' Farnerud; 67' Vitkieviez	Stadium: Moos; Attendance: 3,000; Referee: Pascal Erlachner

11 November 2012 2nd Round	SV Muttenz	1 – 5	BSC Young Boys	Muttenz
15:30	Eksi 81'	Match Report (in German)	8', 32', 62' Frey; 44' Nuzzolo; 77' González	Stadium: Margelacker; Attendance: 2,952; Referee: Nicolas Jancevski

9 December 2012 3rd Round	FC Wil	4 – 3 (a.e.t.)	BSC Young Boys	St. Gallen
14:30	Mouangue 2'; Audino 13'; Holenstein 27'; Božić 113'	Match Report (in German)	65' Frey; 77' Schneuwly; 90+4' Farnerud	Stadium: AFG Arena; Attendance: 1,170; Referee: Sébastien Pache

=== UEFA Europa League ===
==== Qualifying rounds ====
===== Second qualifying round =====
19 July 2012 1st Leg	Young Boys	1 – 0	Zimbru Chişinău	Bern, Switzerland
19:30 CEST	Frey 53'	Match Report (in German)		Stadium: Stade de Suisse; Attendance: 9,117; Referee: Miroslav Zelinka (Czech Republic)

26 July 2012 2nd Leg	Zimbru Chişinău	1 – 0 (a.e.t.) (1 – 1 agg.) (1 – 4 p)	Young Boys	Chișinău, Moldova
20:15 EEST	Barakhoyev 41'	Match Report (in German)		Stadium: Zimbru Stadium; Attendance: 4,500; Referee: Kevin Blom (Netherlands)
	Penalties
	Derkach (penalty scored); Molla (penalty missed); Catan (penalty missed)		(penalty scored) Spycher; (penalty scored) Mayuka; (penalty scored) Nef; (penalty scored) Costanzo

===== Third qualifying round =====
2 August 2012 1st Leg	Kalmar FF	1 – 0	Young Boys	Kalmar, Sweden
19:00 CEST	Andersson 18'	Report		Stadium: Guldfågeln Arena; Attendance: 3,681; Referee: Fernando Teixeira Vitienes (Spain)

19 August 2012 2nd Leg	Young Boys	3 – 0 (3 – 1 agg.)	Kalmar FF	Bern, Switzerland
19:30 CEST	Mayuka 7'; Raimondi 69'; Bobadilla 82'	Report		Stadium: Stade de Suisse; Attendance: 10,124; Referee: Halis Özkahya (Turkey)

==== Playoff round ====
23 August 2012 1st Leg	Midtjylland	0 – 3	Young Boys	Herning, Denmark
20:15		Report	42' Bobadilla; 81' Farnerud; 90+3' Costanzo	Stadium: MCH Arena; Attendance: 4,522; Referee: Maksim Layushkin (Russia)

30 August 2012 2nd Leg	Young Boys	0 – 2 (3 – 2 agg.)	Midtjylland	Bern, Switzerland
19:30		Report	75' (pen.) Igboun; 89' Bak Nielsen	Stadium: Stade de Suisse; Attendance: 9,327; Referee: Alexandru Tudor (Romania)

==== Group stage ====
20 September 2012 1	Young Boys (Switzerland)	3 – 5	(England) Liverpool	Bern, Switzerland
19:00 CET	Nuzzolo 38'; Ojala 53'; Zárate 63'	Match Report (in German)	4' (o.g.) Ojala; 40' Wisdom; 67' Coates; 76', 88' Shelvey	Stadium: Stade de Suisse; Attendance: 31,120; Referee: Michael Koukoulakis (Greece)

4 October 2012 2	Anzhi Makhachkala (Russia)	2 – 0	(Switzerland) Young Boys	Moscow, Russia
18:00 CET	Eto'o 38' (pen.), 90'	Match Report (in German)		Stadium: Lokomotiv Stadium; Attendance: 8,000; Referee: Felix Zwayer (Germany)

25 October 2012 3	Young Boys (Switzerland)	3 – 1	(Italy) Udinese	Bern, Switzerland
21:05 CET	Bobadilla 4', 71', 81' (pen.)	Match Report (in German)	74' Coda	Stadium: Stade de Suisse; Attendance: 20,143; Referee: Clément Turpin (France)

8 November 2012 4	Udinese (Italy)	2 – 3	(Switzerland) Young Boys	Udine, Italy
19:00 CET	Di Natale 47'; Fabbrini 83'	Match Report (in German)	27' Bobadilla; 27' Farnerud; 73' Nuzzolo	Stadium: Stadio Friuli; Attendance: 13,000; Referee: Kristo Tohver (Estonia)

22 November 2012 5	Liverpool (England)	2 – 2	(Switzerland) Young Boys	Liverpool, England
21:05 CET	Shelvey 33'; Cole 72'	Match Report (in German)	52' Bobadilla; 88' Zverotić	Stadium: Anfield; Attendance: 37,810; Referee: Alon Yefet (Israel)

6 December 2012 6	Young Boys (Switzerland)	3 – 1	(Russia) Anzhi Makhachkala	Bern, Switzerland
19:00 CET	Zárate 38'; Costanzo 52'; González 90'	Match Report (in German)	45' Ahmedov; (yellow card) 70' (red card) Traoré	Stadium: Stade de Suisse; Attendance: 17,132; Referee: Matej Jug (Slovenia)

Final group table

Pos	Team	Pld	W	D	L	GF	GA	GD	Pts	Qualification
1	(England) Liverpool	6	3	1	2	11	9	+2	10 (Note: Tiebreakers: Liverpool, Anzhi Makhachkala, and Young Boys are ranked by their head-to-head record.)	Advance to knockout phase
2	(Russia) Anzhi Makhachkala	6	3	1	2	7	5	+2	10	Advance to knockout phase
3	(Switzerland) Young Boys	6	3	1	2	14	13	+1	10	
4	(Italy) Udinese	6	1	1	4	7	12	−5	4	

Source: Soccerway
Notes:

Tiebreakers
Team	Pld	W	D	L	GF	GA	GD	Pts
(England) Liverpool	4	2	1	1	8	6	+2	7
(Russia) Anzhi Makhachkala	4	2	0	2	4	4	0	6
(Switzerland) Young Boys	4	1	1	2	8	10	−2	4

Source: Soccerway

== Squad information ==
=== Squad and statistics ===
Squad Season 2012–2013
No.	Player	Nat.	Birthdate	at YB since	previous club	SL matches	SL goals	Cup matches	Cup goals	EL matches	EL goals
Goalkeepers
1	Marco Wölfli	Swiss	22 August 1982	2003	Thun	20	0	2	0	6	0
18	Yvon Mvogo	Swiss	6 March 1994	2011	Fribourg	0	0	0	0	0	0
27	Ivan Benito	Swiss	27 August 1976	2011	Grasshoppers	0	0	1	0	0	0
Defenders
2	Alexander González	Venezuelan	13 September 1992	2012	Caracas	4(9)	1	0(2)	1	0(5)	1
3	Juhani Ojala	Finnish	19 June 1989	2011	HJK Helsinki	11(1)	0	1	0	4(1)	1
4	Alain Nef	Swiss	2 June 1982	2010	Udinese Calcio	19	1	2	0	5	0
13	Elsad Zverotić	Montenegrin Swiss	31 October 1986	2011	Luzern	12(2)	0	1(1)	0	5	1
17	Christoph Spycher	Swiss	30 March 1978	2010	E. Frankfurt	8(1)	1	1	0	1	0
22	Dušan Veškovac	Serbian	16 March 1986	2011	Luzern	9(1)	0	2	0	4(1)	0
23	Scott Sutter	Swiss English	13 May 1986	2009	Zürich	13(2)	0	3	0	5	0
28	Marco Bürki	Swiss	10 July 1993	2012	Münsingen	2(1)	0	1	0	0	0
33	Jan Lecjaks	Czech	9 August 1990	2011	Plzeň	5(2)	1	0	0	2	0
35	François Affolter	Swiss	13 March 1991	2012	Werder Bremen	2	0	0	0	0	0
Midfielders
6	Michael Silberbauer	Danish	7 July 1981	2011	Utrecht	2(1)	0	0	0	0	0
7	Matías Vitkieviez	Swiss Uruguayan	16 May 1985	2012	Servette	2(11)	0	0(1)	1	1(1)	0
8	Alexander Farnerud	Swedish	1 May 1984	2011	Brøndby	18	4	3	3	5	1
10	Moreno Costanzo	Swiss Italian	20 February 1988	2010	St. Gallen	13(1)	4	1(1)	0	3	1
14	Christian Schneuwly	Swiss	7 February 1988	2012	Thun	14(3)	1	3	2	4(2)	0
15	Josh Simpson	Canadian	15 May 1983	2012	Manisaspor	0	0	0	0	0	0
16	Mario Raimondi	Swiss	10 July 1980	2005	Thun	13(1)	0	3	0	4	0
29	Raphael Nuzzolo	Swiss	5 July 1983	2011	Xamax	14	6	2(1)	1	5(1)	1
30	Pascal Doubaï	Ivorian	22 May 1992	2010	Athletic Adjamé	0(4)	0	0(1)	0	0(2)	0
32	Leonardo Bertone	Swiss	14 March 1994	2011	SC Wohlensee	0	0	0	0	0	0
34	Helios Sessolo	Swiss	26 May 1993	2009	own youth	0	0	0(1)	0	0	0
Forwards
7	Samuel Afum	Ghanan	24 December 1990	2013	Smouha SC	1	0	0	0	0	0
9	Alexander Gerndt	Swedish	14 July 1986	2013	Utrecht	2	0	0	0	0	0
9	Raúl Bobadilla	Argentinian	18 June 1987	2012	M'gladbach	10(1)	5	1	2	6	5
19	Gonzalo Zárate	Argentinian	6 August 1984	2012	RB Salzburg	9(1)	2	3	0	6	2
20	Michael Frey	Swiss	19 July 1994	2012	Thun	6(13)	2	2	3	0(5)	0
24	Emmanuel Mayuka	Zambian	21 November 1990	2010	Maccabi Tel Aviv	7	2	0	0	0	0
25	Josef Martínez	Venezuelan	19 May 1993	2012	Caracas	1(5)	1	0(1)	0	0	0
31	Haris Tabaković	Swiss	20 June 1994	2012	own youth	1	0	0(1)	0	0	0
Last updated: 17 February 2013
Notes: Numbers in parentheses denote substitution appearances. Players in italic left the club during the season.

=== Transfers ===
Summer Transfers in
Name	Nationality	Position	Type	Moving from
Gonzalo Zárate	(Argentina)	ST	Transfer	RB Salzburg
Ammar Jemal	(Tunisia)	CB	loan return	Köln
Christian Schneuwly	(Switzerland)	MF	loan return	Thun
Scott Sutter	(Switzerland)	CB	loan return	Zürich
Alexandre Pasche	(Switzerland)	MF	loan return	Lausanne
Adriano De Pierro	(Switzerland)	CB	loan return	Nyon
Hrvoje Bukovski	(Switzerland)	GK	loan return	Kriens

Summer Transfers Out
Name	Nationality	Position	Type	Moving to
Emmanuel Mayuka	(Zambia)	ST	Transfer	Southampton
David Degen	(Switzerland)	MF	Transfer	Basel
Hrvoje Bukovski	(Switzerland)	GK	Transfer	Kreuzlingen
Ammar Jemal	(Tunisia)	CB	on loan	Ajaccio
Michael Silberbauer	(Denmark)	MF	on loan	Odense
Adriano De Pierro	(Switzerland)	CB	on loan	Lugano
Alexandre Pasche	(Switzerland)	MF	on loan	Servette

Winter Transfers in
Name	Nationality	Position	Type	Moving from
Alexander Gerndt	(Sweden)	ST	Transfer	Utrecht
Samuel Afum	(Ghana)	ST	Transfer	Smouha SC

Winter Transfers Out
Name	Nationality	Position	Type	Moving to
Juhani Ojala	(Finland)	CB	Transfer	Terek Grozny
Raúl Bobadilla	(Argentina)	ST	Transfer	Basel
Ammar Jemal	(Tunisia)	CB	Transfer	Club Africain
Matías Vitkieviez	(Switzerland)	MF	loan return	Servette
