= Pierro (surname) =

Pierro is an Italian surname. Notable people with the surname include:

- Albino Pierro (1916–1995), Italian poet
- Bill Pierro (1926–2006), American baseball player
- Casey Pierro-Zabotel (born 1988), Canadian former ice hockey player
- Gerardo Pierro (1935–2025), Italian Roman Catholic archbishop
- Marina Pierro (born 1956), Italian actress, model, writer, and film director
- Nahuel di Pierro (born 1984), Argentine operatic bass
- Simon Pierro (born 1978), German magician and TV presenter

== See also ==
- Adriano De Pierro (born 1991), Swiss footballer
- Dipierro, several people
