= Schirinzi =

Schirinzi is an Italian surname. Notable people with the surname include:

- Enrico Schirinzi (born 1984), Italian footballer
- Tino Schirinzi (1934–1993), Italian actor and stage director
