= Dipierro =

Dipierro, Di Pierro, di Pierro, or DiPierro is an Italian surname. Notable people with this surname include:

- Gaetano Di Pierro (born 1948), Italian bishop
- Luca Dipierro, Italian animator and illustrator
- Nahuel di Pierro (born 1984), Argentine opera singer
- Ray DiPierro (1926–2014), American football player
- Serena Dipierro, Italian mathematician

== See also ==
- Pierro (surname), people with this surname
