= List of Switzerland international footballers born outside Switzerland =

This page is a list of the football players who played for the Switzerland senior football team born outside Switzerland. This list does not include players born in the country but of foreign descent.

Last updated on 17 November 2026.

== Players ==
=== Argentina ===
- Lucas Blondel 2025– (4) (0)
- Néstor Subiat 1994–1996 (15) (5)

=== Austria ===
- Bernt Haas 1996–2005 (36) (3)

=== Bosnia and Herzegovina ===
==== SFR Yugoslavia ====
- Eldin Jakupović 2008 (1) (0)

=== Cameroon ===
- Breel Embolo 2015– (94) (26)
- François Moubandje 2014–2018 (21) (0)
- Yvon Mvogo 2018– (15) (0)
- Dimitri Oberlin 2018 (2) (0)

=== Canada ===
- Alain Rochat 2005 (1) (0)

=== Cape Verde ===
- Gelson Fernandes 2007–2018 (67) (2)

=== Colombia ===
- Alessandro Frigerio 1932–1937 (10) (1)
- Johan Vonlanthen 2004–2010 (40) (7)

=== Democratic Republic of the Congo ===
- Badile Lubamba 2000 (2) (0)
- Blaise Nkufo 2000–2010 (34) (7)

=== Denmark ===
- Stefan Gartenmann 2025– (3) (0)

=== England ===
- Kwadwo Duah 2024– (6) (1)
- Marvin Keller 2026– (1) (0)
- Scott Sutter 2010 (2) (0)

=== France ===
- Norbert Eschmann 1956–1964 (15) (3)
- Jacques Fatton 1946–1955 (53) (29)
- Roberto Frigerio 1967 (1) (0)
- Christophe Ohrel 1991–1997 (56) (6)
- Alvyn Sanches 2025– (7) (1)

=== Germany ===
- Alfred Bickel 1936–1954 (71) (15)
- Hans-Peter Friedländer 1942–1952 (22) (12)
- Timm Klose 2011–2018 (17) (0)
- Kurt Pichler 1923–1928 (5) (0)

=== Indonesia ===
- Law Adam 1929 (1) (0)

=== Iran ===
- Hossein Ali Khan-Sardar 1920 (1) (0)

=== Italy ===
- Serge Trinchero 1974–1978 (20) (2)

=== Ivory Coast ===
- Johan Djourou 2006–2018 (76) (2)

=== Kosovo ===
- Almen Abdi 2008–2009 (6) (0)
- Valon Behrami 2005–2018 (83) (2)
- Albert Bunjaku 2009–2011 (6) (0)
- Beg Ferati 2011 (1) (0)
- Milaim Rama 2003–2004 (7) (0)
- Xherdan Shaqiri 2010–2024 (125) (32)

=== Nigeria ===
- Innocent Emeghara 2011–2013 (9) (0)

=== North Macedonia ===
==== SFR Yugoslavia ====
- Blerim Džemaili 2006–2018 (69) (10)
- Admir Mehmedi 2011–2021 (76) (10)

=== Portugal ===
- Ulisses Garcia 2021– (11) (0)

=== Romania ===
- Ernst Lörtscher 1934–1938 (21) (0)

=== Russia ===
- Eugen Walaschek 1937–1945 (26) (4)

=== Spain ===
- Adolphe Mengotti 1924 (1) (0)

=== Uruguay ===
- Matías Vitkieviez 2012 (1) (0)

== By country of birth ==
Country	Total
Kosovo	6
France	5
Cameroon	4
Germany	4
England	3
Argentina	2
Cape Verde	2
Colombia	2
Democratic Republic of the Congo	2
North Macedonia	2
Austria	1
Bosnia and Herzegovina	1
Canada	1
Cape Verde	1
Denmark	1
Indonesia	1
Iran	1
Italy	1
Ivory Coast	1
Nigeria	1
Portugal	1
Romania	1
Russia	1
Spain	1
Uruguay	1
