= Darío Lezcano =

Paraguayan footballer (born 1990)

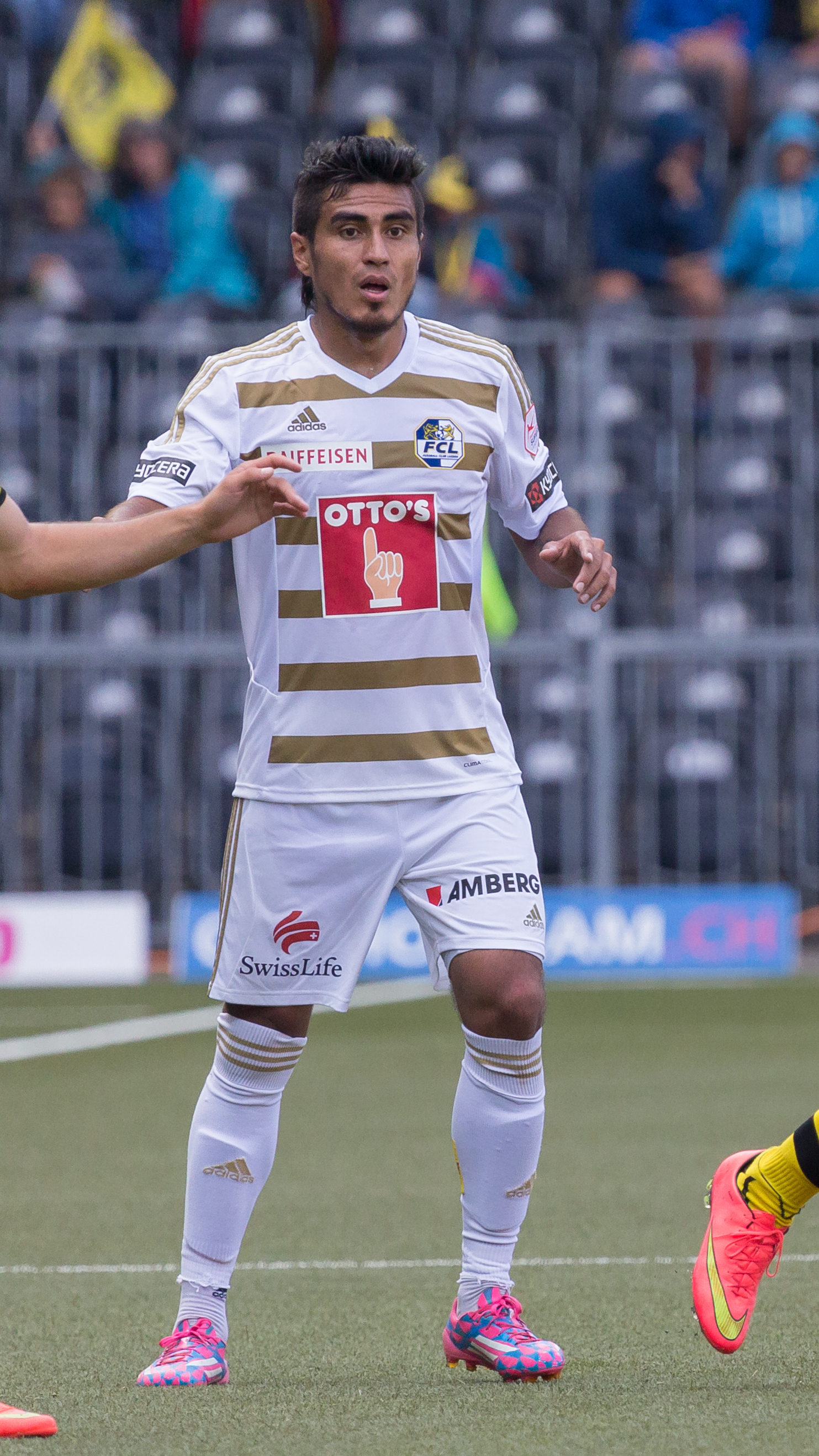
- Lezcano playing for Luzern

Personal information
- Full name: Darío Lezcano Mendoza
- Date of birth: 30 June 1990 (age 36)
- Place of birth: Asunción, Paraguay
- Height: 1.78 m (5 ft 10 in)
- Position: Forward

Youth career
- 2004: 4 de Octubre
- 2005–2006: Nanawa

Senior career*
Years	Team	Apps	(Gls)
2007–2008	Trinidense	11	(1)
2008–2011	FC Wil	66	(14)
2011–2012	Thun	34	(4)
2012–2016	Luzern	100	(31)
2016–2019	Ingolstadt	103	(23)
2019–2023	Juárez	75	(31)
2023–2024	Colo-Colo	8	(3)
2024	→ Tacuary (loan)	23	(1)
2025	Tembetary	4	(0)

International career^{‡}
2006–2007	Paraguay U17	15	(5)
2015–2020	Paraguay	20	(4)
- * Club domestic league appearances and goals as of 16 February 2024 ‡ National team caps and goals as of 13 November 2020

Darío Lezcano Mendoza (born 30 June 1990) is a Paraguayan former professional footballer who played as a forward. He represented Paraguay at under-17 level from 2006 to 2007 and later at full international level from 2015 to 2017, scoring 4 goals during the 2018 FIFA World Cup qualifiers.

== Club career ==
=== Early career ===
During the winter break of the 2010–11 Swiss Super League season Lezcano transferred from FC Wil to FC Thun. He scored his first goal for the club during his first appearance on 6 February 2011 in the 3–2 home defeat against FC Basel.

=== FC Luzern ===
During the winter break of the 2011–12 Swiss Super League season Lezcano transferred to Luzern. He played his team debut on 19 February 2012 in the goalless draw away against Lausanne-Sport. In his second game on 25 February he scored his first two goals for his new club in the 2–0 home win against BSC Young Boys.

While playing for Luzern, Lezcano was banned eight matches for assaulting referee Fedayi San, who showed him a second yellow card. The player then pushed the referee's chest, knocking the red card out of his hand. Imposing the ban, the league said in a statement that "respect for referees is a fundamental part of the game."

=== FC Ingolstadt ===
Lezcano signed for FC Ingolstadt on 15 January 2016.

=== Colo-Colo ===
In 2023, Lezcano signed with Colo-Colo from Mexican club Juárez.

==== loan to Tacuary ====
After having no chances to play for Colo-Colo, he was loaned out to Tacuary in his homeland in February 2024.

== International career ==
=== Paraguay U17 ===
Lezcano played the Sub17 Sudamericano 2007 in Ecuador for the Paraguay national under-17 football team.

=== Paraguay ===
Lezcano was selected for the Paraguay senior squad by Ramón Díaz and made his debut in the 2018 FIFA World Cup qualification match against Argentina on 15 October 2015.

== Career statistics ==
=== Club ===
As of match played 12 May 2019

Appearances and goals by club, season and competition
Club	Season	League			Cup		Other		Total	
Club	Season	Division	Apps	Goals	Apps	Goals	Apps	Goals	Apps	Goals
FC Wil	2009–10	Swiss Challenge League	25	3	0	0	—		25	3
FC Wil	2010–11	Swiss Challenge League	15	6	0	0	—		15	6
FC Wil	Total		40	9	0	0	0	0	40	9
Thun	2010–11	Swiss Super League	17	3	1	0	6 (Note: Appearances in the UEFA Europa League)	1	24	4
Thun	2011–12	Swiss Super League	17	1	0	0	—		17	1
Thun	Total		34	4	1	0	6	1	41	5
FC Luzern	2011–12	Swiss Super League	14	3	3	1	—		17	4
FC Luzern	2012–13	Swiss Super League	14	2	0	0	2	0	16	2
FC Luzern	2013–14	Swiss Super League	27	5	3	1	—		30	6
FC Luzern	2014–15	Swiss Super League	33	12	2	1	2	0	37	13
FC Luzern	2015–16	Swiss Super League	12	9	1	1	—		13	10
FC Luzern	Total		100	31	9	4	4	0	113	35
FC Ingolstadt	2015–16	Bundesliga	17	2	0	0	—		17	2
FC Ingolstadt	2016–17	Bundesliga	33	6	2	0	—		35	6
FC Ingolstadt	2017–18	2. Bundesliga	24	6	3	1	—		27	7
FC Ingolstadt	2018–19	2. Bundesliga	29	9	0	0	—		29	9
FC Ingolstadt	Total		103	23	5	1	0	0	108	24
Career total			277	67	15	5	10	1	302	73

=== International ===
Scores and results list Paraguay's goal tally first, score column indicates score after each Lezcano goal.

List of international goals scored by Darío Lezcano
No.	Date	Venue	Opponent	Score	Result	Competition
1	17 November 2015	Estadio Defensores del Chaco, Asunción, Paraguay	Bolivia	1–1	2–1	2018 FIFA World Cup qualification
2	24 March 2016	Estadio Olímpico Atahualpa, Quito, Ecuador	Ecuador	1–1	2–2	2018 FIFA World Cup qualification
3	24 March 2016	Estadio Olímpico Atahualpa, Quito, Ecuador	Ecuador	2–1	2–2	2018 FIFA World Cup qualification
4	29 March 2016	Estadio Defensores del Chaco, Asunción, Paraguay	Brazil	1–0	2–2	2018 FIFA World Cup qualification
