= Sékou Sanogo (footballer) =

Ivorian association footballer

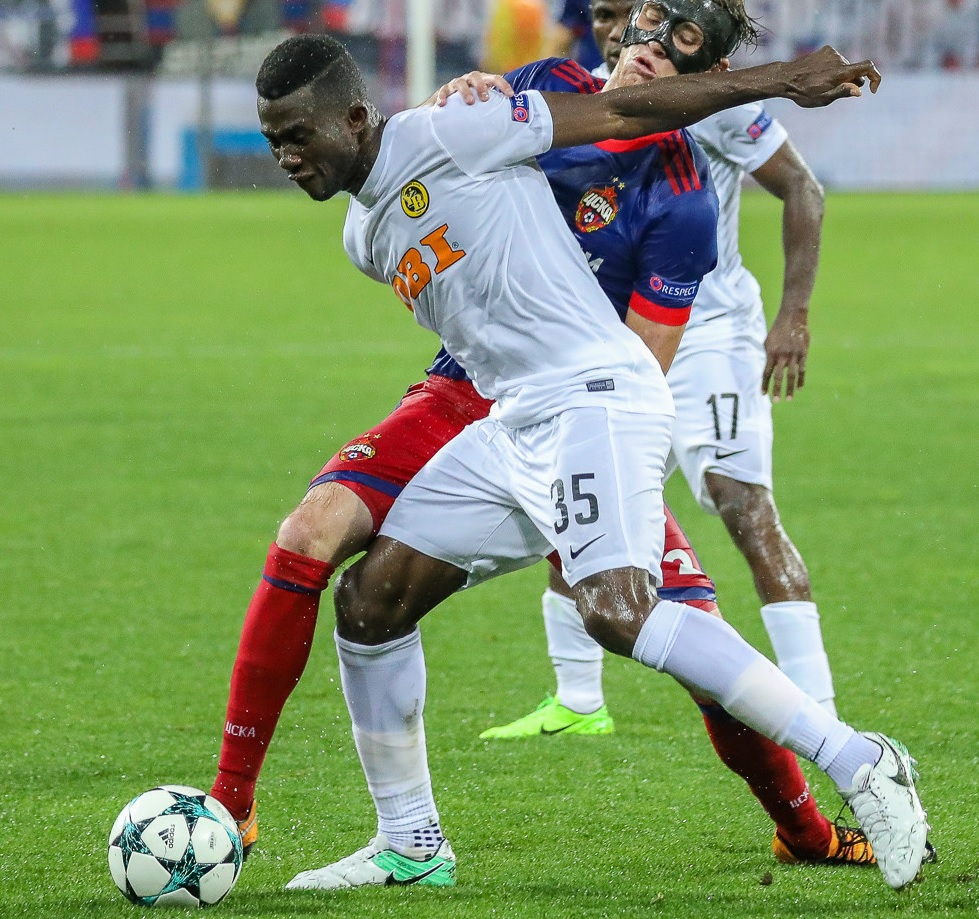
- Sanogo with Young Boys in 2017

Personal information
- Full name: Sékou Junior Sanogo
- Date of birth: 5 May 1989 (age 37)
- Place of birth: Abidjan, Ivory Coast
- Height: 1.83 m (6 ft 0 in)
- Position: Midfielder

Senior career*
Years	Team	Apps	(Gls)
2008–2010	Africa Sports		
2011–2014	Thun	48	(4)
2012	→ Lausanne-Sport (loan)	14	(0)
2012–2013	→ Lausanne-Sport (loan)	31	(2)
2014–2019	Young Boys	99	(11)
2019	Al-Ittihad	11	(1)
2020–2023	Red Star Belgrade	60	(4)
2023	→ Paris FC (loan)	1	(0)
2024	Schaffhausen	10	(0)
2024–2025	Železničar Pančevo	16	(0)

International career^{‡}
2017	Ivory Coast	3	(0)
- * Club domestic league appearances and goals as of 15 June 2025 ‡ National team caps and goals as of 21 January 2020

Sékou Junior Sanogo (born 5 May 1989) is an Ivorian professional footballer who plays as a midfielder.

== Club career ==
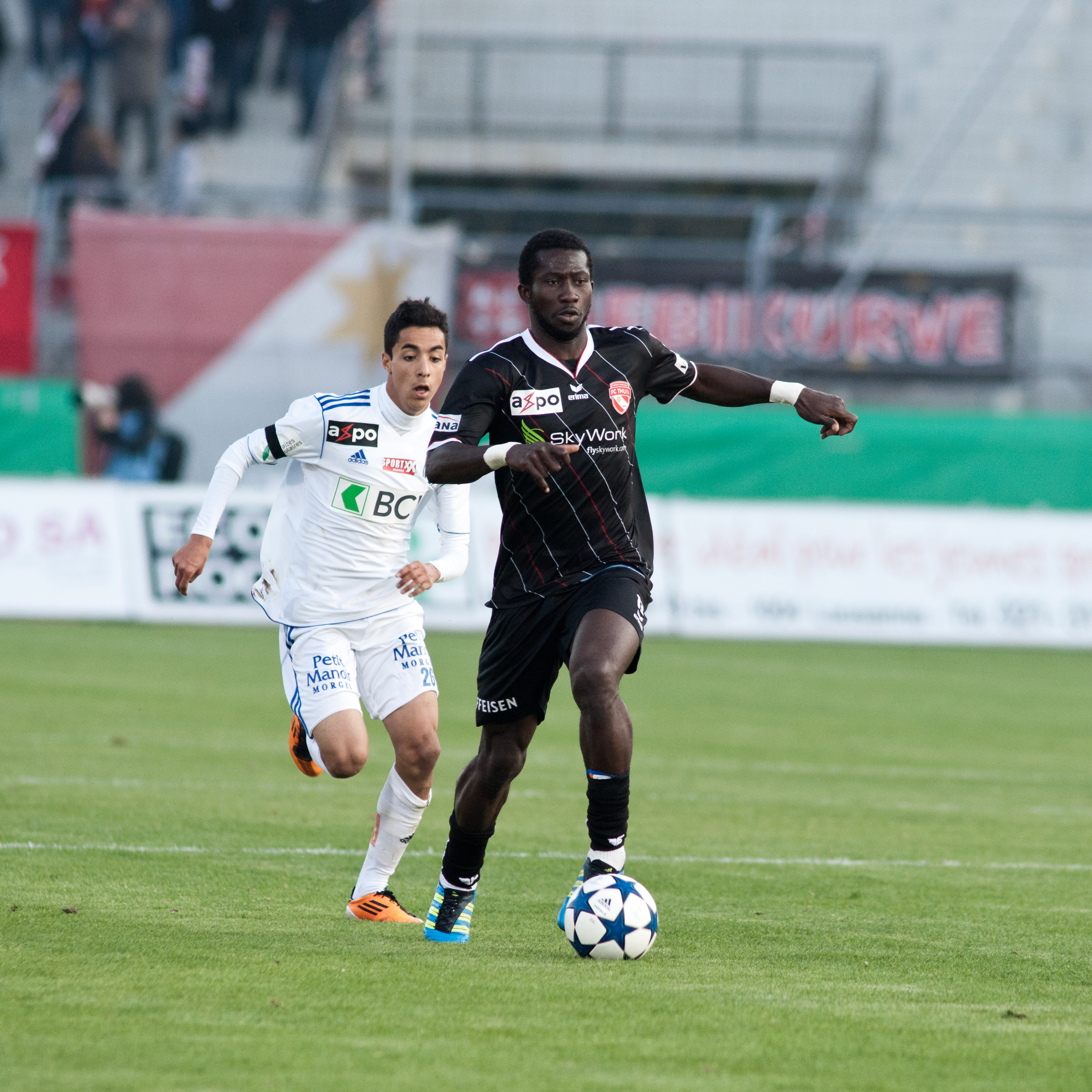
Sanogo with FC Thun in 2011

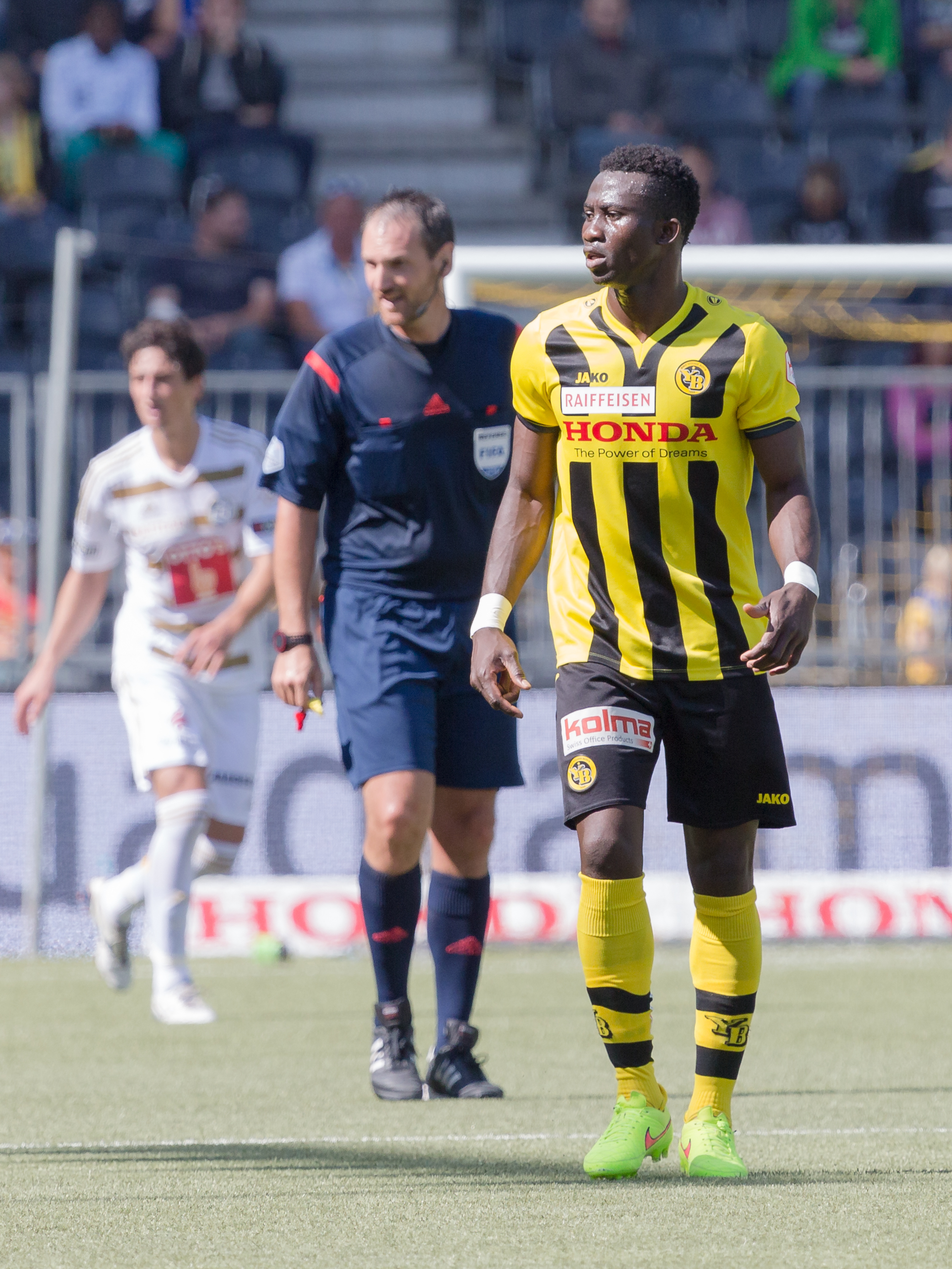
Sanogo with Young Boys in 2014

Sanogo was part of the Young Boys squad that won the 2017–18 Swiss Super League, their first league title in 32 years.

On 21 January 2020, Sanogo signed a one-year loan with Serbian club Red Star Belgrade.

Sanogo completed his move to the Serbian heavy weights Red Star Belgrade FC on 27 January 2021 from Saudi club Al-Ittihad Club (Jeddah) on a two-year deal with his contract expiring in 2023.

On 31 January 2023, Sanogo joined Paris FC in the French Ligue 2 on loan until the end of the season.

On 15 January 2024, Sanogo returned to Switzerland and signed with Schaffhausen.

== International career ==
An Ivory Coast international, Sanogo made his international debut for ”Les Éléphants” in a friendly match which resulted in a 1–1 tie with Senegal on 27 March 2017.

== Career statistics ==
=== Club ===
As of match played 23 August 2024

Appearances and goals by club, season and competition
Club	Season	League			National Cup (Note: Including Swiss Cup, King's Cup, Serbian Cup)		Continental		Other		Total	
Club	Season	Division	Apps	Goals	Apps	Goals	Apps	Goals	Apps	Goals	Apps	Goals
Thun	2010–11	Super League	14	1	1	0	—		—		15	1
Thun	2011–12	Super League	9	0	0	0	5 (Note: Appearance(s) in UEFA Europa League)	0	—		14	0
Thun	2013–14	Super League	25	3	2	0	9	2	—		36	5
Thun	Total		48	4	3	0	14	2	—		65	6
Lausanne-Sport (loan)	2011–12	Super League	14	0	0	0	—		—		14	0
Lausanne-Sport (loan)	2012–13	Super League	31	2	1	0	—		—		32	2
Lausanne-Sport (loan)	Total		45	2	1	0	—		—		46	2
Young Boys	2014–15	Super League	25	1	0	0	11	1	—		36	2
Young Boys	2015–16	Super League	11	2	1	0	1 (Note: Appearance(s) in UEFA Champions League)	0	—		13	2
Young Boys	2016–17	Super League	21	2	2	1	6 (Note: Two appearances in UEFA Champions League, four appearances in UEFA Europa League)	0	—		29	3
Young Boys	2017–18	Super League	27	5	3	0	7 (Note: Four appearances in UEFA Champions League, three appearances in UEFA Europa League)	0	—		37	5
Young Boys	2018–19	Super League	15	1	2	0	6	0	—		23	1
Young Boys	Total		99	11	8	1	31	1	—		138	13
Al-Ittihad	2018–19	Saudi Pro League	11	1	5	0	5 (Note: Appearance(s) in AFC Champions League Elite)	0	—		21	1
Red Star	2019–20	SuperLiga	1	0	0	0	0	0	—		1	0
Red Star	2020–21	SuperLiga	23	2	5	0	10 (Note: Three appearances in UEFA Champions League, seven appearances in UEFA Europa League)	0	—		38	2
Red Star	2021–22	SuperLiga	24	2	2	0	13 (Note: Four appearances in UEFA Champions League, nine appearances in UEFA Europa League)	0	—		39	2
Red Star	2022–23	SuperLiga	12	0	1	0	8 (Note: Four appearances in UEFA Champions League, four appearances in UEFA Europa League)	0	—		21	0
Red Star	Total		60	4	8	0	31	0	—		99	4
Paris FC (loan)	2022–23	Ligue 2	5	0	1	0	—		—		6	0
Schaffausen	2023–24	Challenge League	10	0	0	0	—		—		10	0
Career total			278	22	26	1	81	3	—		385	26

== Honours ==
Africa Sports

- Ligue 1: 2008
- Coupe de Côte d'Ivoire (2): 2009, 2010

Young Boys

- Swiss Super League (2): 2017–18, 2018–19

Red Star Belgrade

- Serbian SuperLiga (3): 2019–20, 2020–21, 2021–22
- Serbian Cup (2): 2020–21, 2021–22

Individual

- Swiss Super League Team of the Year: 2017–18, 2018–19
