= Milaim Rama =

Swiss footballer (born 1976)

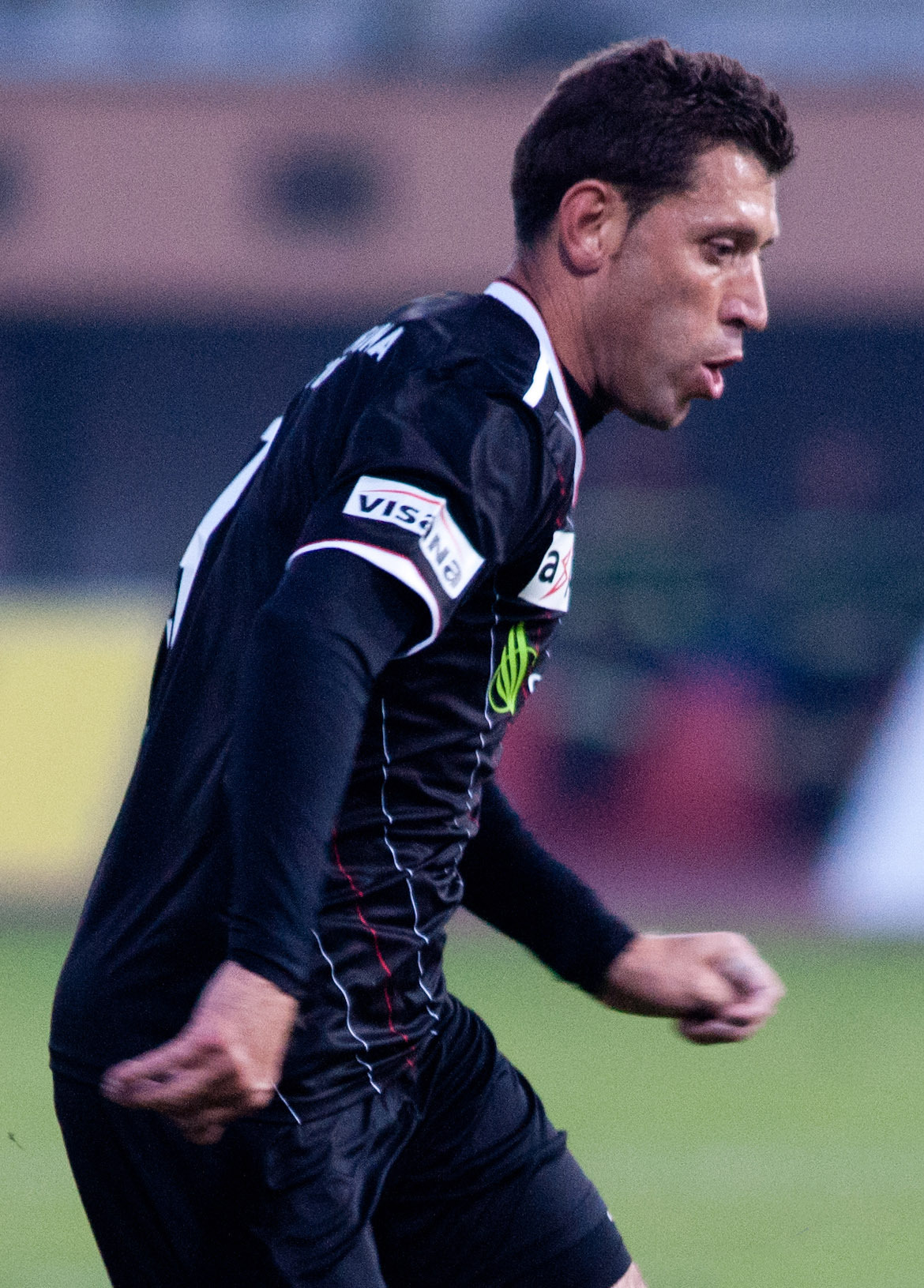
- Rama with Thun in 2011

Personal information
- Date of birth: 29 February 1976 (age 50)
- Place of birth: Viti, Republic of Kosova
- Height: 1.85 m (6 ft 1 in)
- Position: Striker

Youth career
- –1994: Besëlidhja Prishtinë
- 1994–1997: FC Interlaken

Senior career*
Years	Team	Apps	(Gls)
1997–2004	Thun	224	(73)
2004–2005	FC Augsburg	13	(1)
2005–2006	Schaffhausen	26	(5)
2006–2012	Thun	130	(31)
Total		393	(110)

International career
2003–2004	Switzerland	7	(0)
- * Club domestic league appearances and goals

Milaim Rama (born 29 February 1976) is a former professional footballer who spent most of his career playing for Thun. In addition to Thun, he also played for FC Augsburg, Schaffhausen. Born in SFR Yugoslavia, he played for the Switzerland national team at international level.

== International career ==
Rama had the right to represent two countries at the international level, such as Albania or Switzerland, with the latter he made his debut on 20 August 2003 in a friendly match against France after coming on as a substitute at 46th minute in place of Stéphane Chapuisat, becoming the first Kosovan to debut with Switzerland. His last international match was on 21 June 2004 in UEFA Euro 2004 group stage again against France.

== Personal life ==
Rama was born in Viti, SFR Yugoslavia to Kosovo Albanian parents from the village Zhiti near Viti. At the age of 17, he immigrated to Switzerland and in 2003 received a Swiss passport. Rama is the father of Kosovo international Alketa Rama.
