= Thomas Reinmann =

Swiss footballer (born 1983)

Tom Reinmann
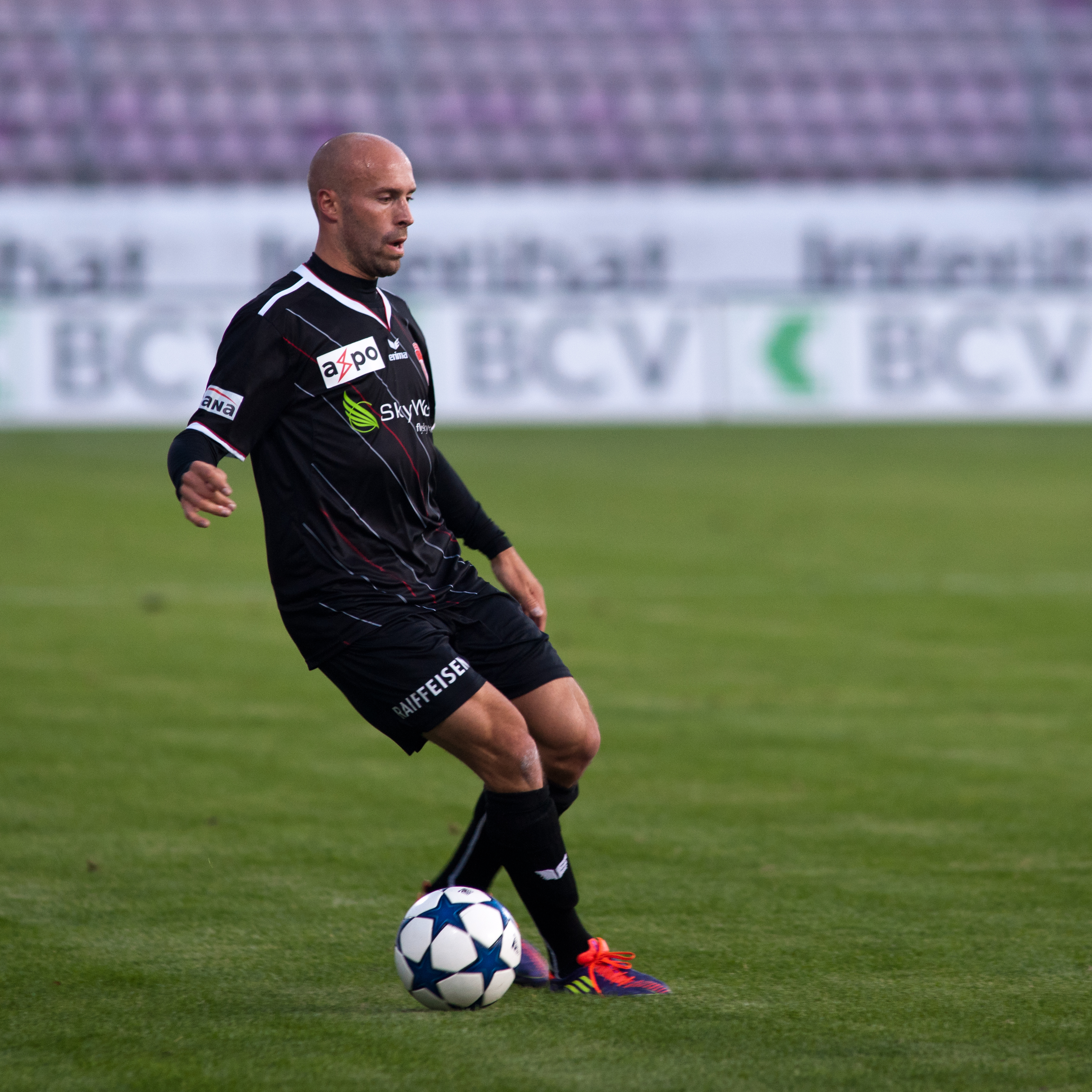

Personal information
- Date of birth: 9 April 1983 (age 43)
- Place of birth: Langenthal, Switzerland
- Height: 1.78 m (5 ft 10 in)
- Position: Defender

Team information
- Current team: FC Herzogenbuchsee (player-coach)

Youth career
- FC Aarwangen
- FC Herzogenbuchsee
- –2003: BSC Young Boys

Senior career*
Years	Team	Apps	(Gls)
2003–2006	FC Baden	75	(1)
2006–2009	FC Vaduz	60	(1)
2009–2017	FC Thun	133	(5)
2017–	FC Herzogenbuchsee	0	(0)

Managerial career
- 2017–: FC Herzogenbuchsee (player-coach)
- * Club domestic league appearances and goals

Thomas Reinmann (born 9 April 1983) is a Swiss football defender who currently works for FC Herzogenbuchsee as a player-coach.

== International career ==
Reinmann has represented Switzerland at every level between Under 15 and Under 20.
