= Mauro Lustrinelli =

Swiss footballer (born 1976)

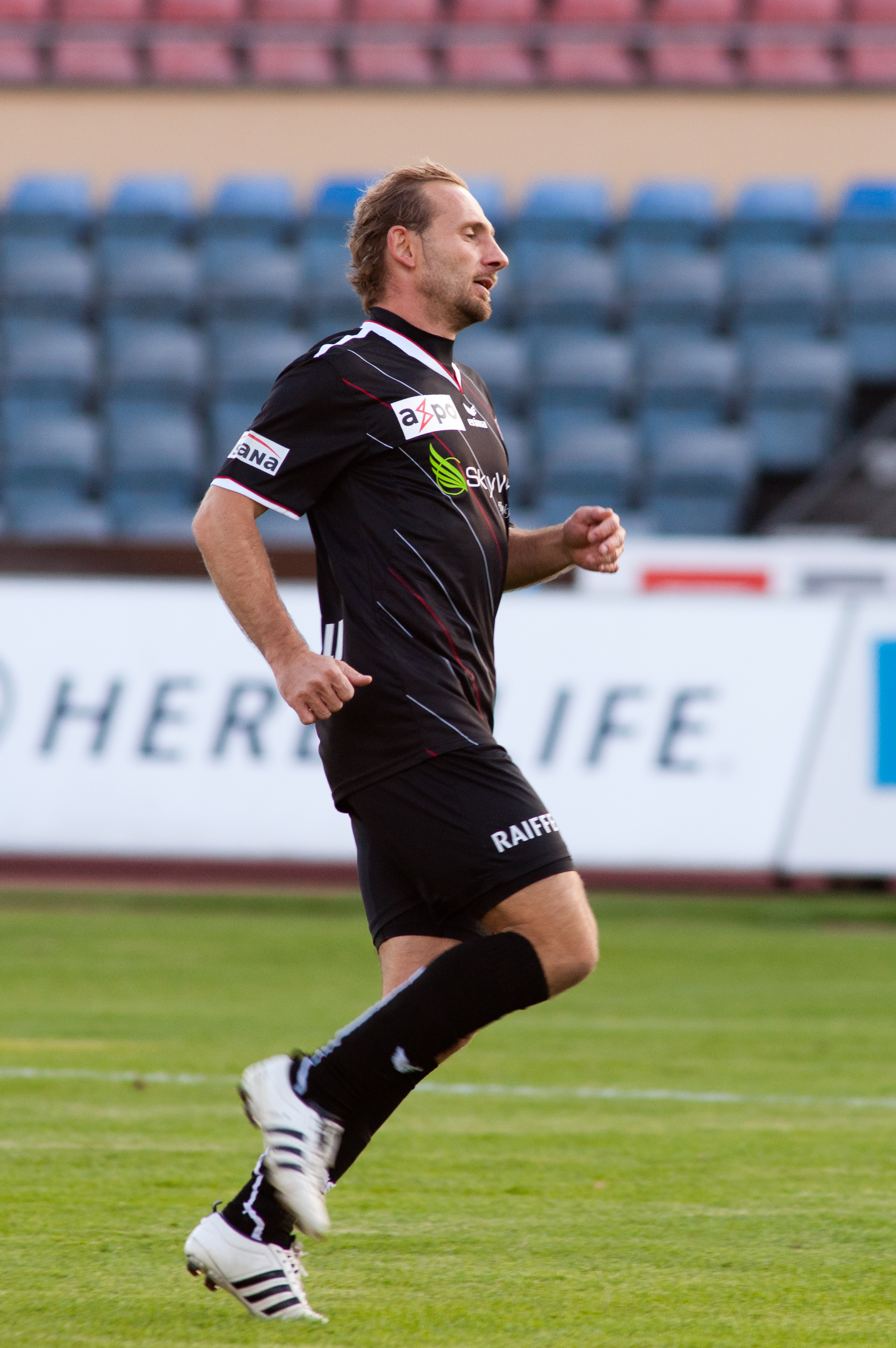
- Lustrinelli with FC Thun in 2011

Personal information
- Full name: Mauro Lustrinelli
- Date of birth: 26 February 1976 (age 50)
- Place of birth: Bellinzona, Switzerland
- Height: 1.73 m (5 ft 8 in)
- Position: Striker

Team information
- Current team: Union Berlin (manager)

Youth career
- 1986–1989: Giubiasco
- 1989–1992: Bellinzona
- 1992–1994: Giubiasco

Senior career*
Years	Team	Apps	(Gls)
1994–2001	Bellinzona	164	(109)
2001–2004	Wil	79	(22)
2004–2006	Thun	66	(36)
2006–2007	Sparta Prague	25	(6)
2007–2008	Luzern	43	(16)
2008–2011	Bellinzona	77	(34)
2010	→ Young Boys (loan)	12	(3)
2011	Thun	18	(4)
Total		484	(230)

International career
2005–2008	Switzerland	12	(0)

Managerial career
- 2012: Thun (interim)
- 2017: Thun (interim)
- 2018–2022: Switzerland U21
- 2022–2026: Thun
- 2026–: Union Berlin
- * Club domestic league appearances and goals

Mauro "Lustri" Lustrinelli (born 26 February 1976) is a Swiss professional football manager and former footballer who is the manager of Bundesliga club Union Berlin. A striker, he played for the Switzerland national team.

== Club career ==
Lustrinelli started his professional career at Bellinzona in 1994 and played for them until 2001. Then he transferred to Wil and played there for the next three seasons before transferring to Thun in 2004. In 2004–05, he was the Swiss Super League's second highest goalscorer with 20 goals and also qualified with the club for the UEFA Champions League. In 2006, he signed for Sparta Prague but after one year at the club he returned to Switzerland and joined Luzern in order to play first team football leading up to UEFA Euro 2008. After one season he returned to Bellinzona.

== International career ==
Lustrinelli made his debut for the Switzerland national team on 17 August 2005 in a friendly against Norway. He was part of the Swiss squad at the 2006 FIFA World Cup. On 19 June 2006, he was substituted on to play the last four minutes of Switzerland's final World Cup group match against Togo and after only one minute of playing he assisted Tranquillo Barnetta to score the second goal in a 2–0 win. The 2006 World Cup was his last appearance in a Swiss jersey. He was not selected for UEFA Euro 2008.

== Coaching career ==
Lustrinelli began his coaching career at Thun, before managing the Switzerland U21 side, then returning to Thun in 2022. He later led the club to the 2024–25 Swiss Challenge League title, and their first-ever Swiss Super League title in the 2025–26 season. On 21 May 2026, he was announced as manager of German side 1. FC Union Berlin ahead of the 2026–27 season.

== Style of management ==
Under Lustrinelli, Thun plays under a high-pressing system.

== Personal life ==
Lustrinelli is of Italian descent through his father, who is originally from Molise. Being originally from the northern part of Ticino (the Sopraceneri), Lustrinelli grew up close to referee Massimo Busacca who also represented Switzerland at the 2006 World Cup.

He has a Bachelor of Business Administration and wrote his thesis on Italy's Serie A.

== Managerial statistics ==
As of match played 21 November 2026

Managerial record by team and tenure
Team	From	To	Record				
Team	From	To	P	W	D	L	Win %
Thun (caretaker)	27 March 2017	30 June 2017	11	5	3	3	45.45
Switzerland U21 (caretaker)	1 February 2018	30 June 2018	2	1	0	1	50.00
Switzerland U21	1 July 2018	30 June 2022	30	20	3	7	66.67
Thun	1 July 2022	30 June 2026	157	85	33	39	54.14
Union Berlin	1 July 2026	present	12	2	4	6	16.67
Career total			212	113	43	56	53.30

== Honours ==
=== Managerial ===
Thun

- Swiss Super League: 2025–26
- Swiss Challenge League: 2024–25
