= Mirson Volina =

Albanian footballer

Personal information
- Date of birth: 8 January 1990 (age 36)
- Place of birth: North Macedonia
- Height: 1.80 m (5 ft 11 in)
- Position: Midfielder

Senior career*
Years	Team	Apps	(Gls)
2007–2013	FC Thun	29	(0)
2012	→ Biel-Bienne (loan)	10	(0)
2013	FC Köniz	0	(0)
2013–2014	SC Pfullendorf	22	(2)
2014	Sportfreunde Siegen	12	(0)
2015–2020	Breitenrain Bern		

International career
2009–2010	Albania U21	1	(0)
- * Club domestic league appearances and goals as of 00:01, 12 June 2024 (UTC)

Mirson Volina (born 8 January 1990) is an Albanian footballer who most recently played as a midfielder for FC Breitenrain Bern in the Swiss Promotion League.

== Club career ==
Volina spent two seasons in Germany, with SC Pfullendorf and Sportfreunde Siegen.
