= Kevin Bigler =

Swiss footballer (born 1992)

Personal information
- Date of birth: 5 October 1992 (age 34)
- Place of birth: Muri bei Bern, Switzerland
- Height: 1.71 m (5 ft 7 in)
- Position: Defender

Youth career
- 2001–2003: FC Muri-Gümligen
- 2003–2006: Breitenrain
- 2006–2009: Thun
- 2009: Breitenrain
- 2009–2010: Young Boys

Senior career*
Years	Team	Apps	(Gls)
2010–2019	Thun U21	66	(5)
2010–2020	Thun	70	(1)
2015	→ Biel-Bienne (loan)	1	(0)
- * Club domestic league appearances and goals

Kevin Bigler (born 5 October 1992) is a Swiss former footballer.
