= David Moser =

Swiss footballer (born 1989)

Personal information
- Full name: David Moser
- Date of birth: 24 March 1989 (age 37)
- Place of birth: Thun, Switzerland
- Height: 1.83 m (6 ft 0 in)
- Position: Goalkeeper

Team information
- Current team: FC Winterthur
- Number: 1

Youth career
- FC Thun II

Senior career*
Years	Team	Apps	(Gls)
2011–2014	FC Thun	5	(0)
2014–	FC Winterthur	0	(0)
- * Club domestic league appearances and goals as of 2 December 2013

David Moser (born 24 March 1989) is a Swiss football goalkeeper. He currently plays for FC Winterthur.

He has played for FC Thun in the Swiss Super League.
