= Jérémy Manière =

Swiss footballer (born 1991)

Personal information
- Full name: Jérémy Manière
- Date of birth: 26 July 1991 (age 35)
- Place of birth: Switzerland
- Height: 1.82 m (5 ft 11 1/2 in)
- Position: Centre back

Youth career
- FC Vallorbe-Ballaigues
- Yverdon-Sport

Senior career*
Years	Team	Apps	(Gls)
2008–2011	Yverdon-Sport	50	(0)
2012–2013	Thun	11	(0)
2013–2016	Biel-Bienne	87	(2)
2016–2019	Lausanne-Sport	59	(1)
2019–2020	Stade Lausanne Ouchy	14	(0)
- * Club domestic league appearances and goals

Jérémy Manière (born 26 July 1991) is a retired Swiss footballer.

== Career ==
=== Stade Lausanne Ouchy ===
On 29 June 2019 it was confirmed, that Maniére had joined FC Stade Lausanne Ouchy. On 1 March 2020 28-year old Maniére announced, that he had decided to retire due to his knee, as he was afraid that his knee would be too broken for him to have a life after football.
