= Thomas Fekete =

Swiss footballer (born 1995)

Personal information
- Full name: Thomas Lukas Fraga Fekete
- Date of birth: 19 September 1995 (age 31)
- Place of birth: Bern, Switzerland
- Height: 1.78 m (5 ft 10 in)
- Position: Left back

Team information
- Current team: FC Chiasso (on loan from BSC Young Boys)
- Number: 31

Youth career
- 2005–2013: BSC Young Boys

Senior career*
Years	Team	Apps	(Gls)
2013–	BSC Young Boys	2	(0)
2014–2015	→ FC Biel (loan)	10	(0)
2015–2016	→ FC Vaduz (loan)	2	(0)
2016–2017	→ FC Aarau (loan)	0	(0)
2017–	→ FC Chiasso (loan)	1	(0)

International career
2013–2014	Switzerland U19	4	(0)
- * Club domestic league appearances and goals as of 5 April 2017 (UTC)

Thomas Lukas Fraga Fekete (born 19 September 1995) is a Swiss footballer who currently plays as a left back for FC Chiasso on loan from Swiss Super League-side BSC Young Boys.

== Club career ==
Fekete is a youth exponent from BSC Young Boys. He made his Swiss Super League debut at 29 September 2013 against FC Zürich in 0-1 home defeat. He replaced Christoph Spycher at half-time. He made 2 league appearances during the 2013/14 season.
