= Adriano De Pierro =

Swiss footballer (born 1991)

Personal information
- Date of birth: 11 January 1991 (age 35)
- Place of birth: Morges, Switzerland
- Height: 1.84 m (6 ft 0 in)
- Position: Centre-back

Team information
- Current team: Stade Nyonnais
- Number: 16

Youth career
- Forward Morges
- 2008—2009: Lausanne-Sport

Senior career*
Years	Team	Apps	(Gls)
2009—2011	Young Boys II	31	(0)
2010—2013	Young Boys	9	(0)
2011—2012	→ Stade Nyonnais (loan)	29	(0)
2012—2013	→ Lugano (loan)	29	(2)
2013—2015	Lausanne-Sport	43	(1)
2015—2016	Neuchâtel Xamax	10	(1)
2016–2022	Yverdon	92	(11)
2021–2022	→ Bellinzona (loan)	14	(0)
2022–	Stade Nyonnais	45	(2)

International career^{‡}
2009–2010	Switzerland U19	10	(0)
2010–2011	Switzerland U20	3	(0)
- * Club domestic league appearances and goals as of 6 November 2024 ‡ National team caps and goals as of 23 June 2013

Adriano De Pierro (born 11 January 1991) is a Swiss professional footballer who plays for Stade Nyonnais.

== Career ==
De Pierro grew up in the small town of Échandens in Suisse Romande and initially began his career with local club Forward Morges before a move to the academy of FC Lausanne-Sport. Eventually he earned a big move to Swiss Super League side BSC Young Boys in 2009, going on to feature for the reserves and appearing several times for the first-team during his first two years with the club. Looking to gain more playing time, De Pierro went on loan to second division club FC Stade Nyonnais for the duration of the 2011–12 season. Returning to Young Boys, the player went on loan again to a second-tier side, this time joining FC Lugano for the 2012–13 season. In the summer of 2013 De Pierro signed for FC Lausanne-Sport on a two-year contract with an option for a one-year extension. In a bid to reduce their squad, he was allowed to leave Young Boys for Lausanne despite the fact that his contract was set to expire in 2014.

On 1 September 2021, he was loaned by Yverdon to Bellinzona.
