= Marco Schneuwly =

Swiss footballer (born 1985)

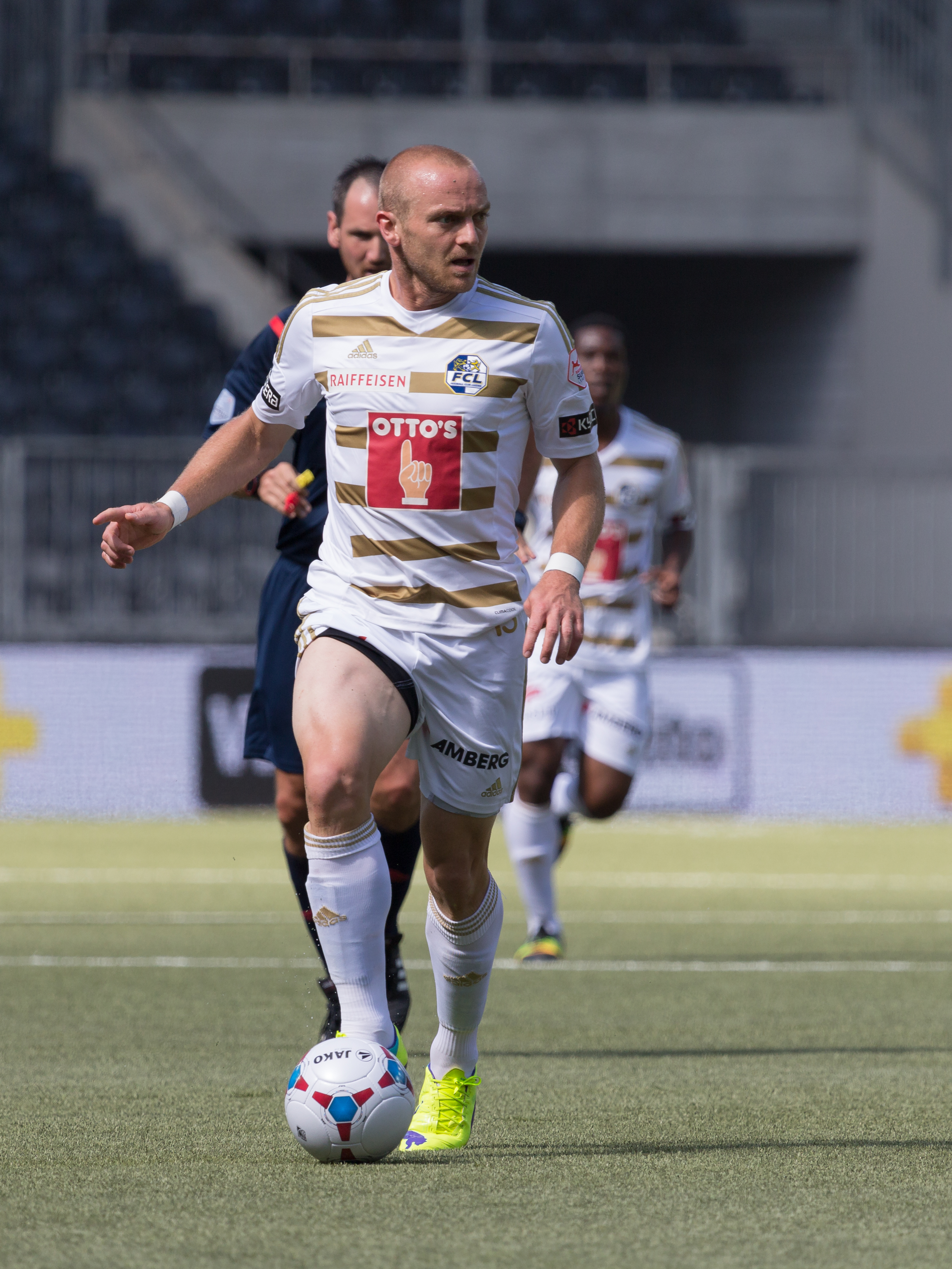

Personal information
- Full name: Marco Schneuwly
- Date of birth: 27 March 1985 (age 41)
- Place of birth: Wünnewil, Switzerland
- Height: 1.80 m (5 ft 11 in)
- Position: Striker

Senior career*
Years	Team	Apps	(Gls)
2001–2002	FC Fribourg	3	(0)
2004–2012	BSC Young Boys	119	(19)
2006	→ FC Sion (loan)	14	(4)
2006–2007	→ SC Kriens (loan)	32	(9)
2012–2014	FC Thun	79	(29)
2014–2017	FC Luzern	105	(47)
2017–2018	FC Sion	32	(7)
2018–	FC Aarau	11	(1)

International career
- Switzerland U-17
2004–2007	Switzerland U-20	5	(0)
2005–2007	Switzerland U-21	2	(0)
Medal record
Men's football
Representing Switzerland
UEFA European Under-17 Championship
Winner	2002 Denmark
- * Club domestic league appearances and goals as of 20 Dec. 2018

Marco Schneuwly (born 27 March 1985) is a Swiss footballer who plays as a striker for Aarau in the Swiss Challenge League, the second tier of football in Switzerland.

He is a former youth international and was in the Swiss U-17 squad that won the 2002 U-17 European Championships.

== Personal life ==
His brother Christian Schneuwly is also a footballer. The siblings have played together for BSC Young Boys, FC Thun and FC Luzern.

== Honours ==
- UEFA U-17 European Champion: 2002

== Individual ==
- Swiss Cup Top goalacorers: 2014–15, 2015–16,
- Swiss Super League Team of the Year: 2016–17
