= Nicolas Schindelholz =

Swiss footballer (1988–2022)

Personal information
- Date of birth: 12 February 1988
- Place of birth: Binningen, Switzerland
- Date of death: 18 September 2022 (aged 34)
- Height: 1.80 m (5 ft 11 in)
- Positions: Centre-back; left-back

Youth career
- –2005: SC Dornach
- 2005–2009: FC Basel

Senior career*
Years	Team	Apps	(Gls)
2006–2009	FC Basel U21	76	(4)
2009–2010	FC Thun U-21	3	(0)
2009–2017	FC Thun	121	(5)
2017–2018	FC Luzern	2	(0)
2018–2021	FC Aarau	37	(4)
Total		239	(13)
- * Club domestic league appearances and goals

Nicolas Schindelholz (12 February 1988 – 18 September 2022) was a Swiss professional footballer who played as a defender.

== Career ==
Schindelholz played his youth football and began his playing career with local semi-professional club SC Dornach. At the age of 16, he made his debut as a central defender for his home club Dornach in the 1. Liga, at that time the fourth tier of the Swiss football league system. Immediately FC Basel discovered him and he moved to their youth department. He played in their U-18 team during the 2005–06 season, under coach Patrick Rahmen and his assistant Marco Walker and with them won both the Swiss U-18 championship and the U-19/18 national cup that season. The following season he advanced to their U-21 team, who played in the third tier, and they won their division and became Swiss champions at U-21 level. A year later, the team defended their title as division (group2) winners in the 2007–08 season, and became Swiss champions at U-21 level again. By then Schindelholz had long become the team captain. Another year later, in the 2008–09 season, Schindelholz led the team to become division (group2) winners and Swiss champions at the U-21 level for the third successive time.

Murat Yakin was appointed as new head coach of FC Thun in summer 2009 and one of his first actions was to acquire the services of Schindelholz and Timm Klose, both of whom could not make it to Basel's first team under new head coach Thorsten Fink. The team played in the second tier and Schindelholz achieved 27 league and two cup appearances during the 2009–10 Challenge League season. They were division champions and won promotion. In his second season with the club, Thun managed to finish 5th in the 2010–11 Super League season and thus earned the Qualification to 2011–12 Europa League second qualifying round. In the new season, Schindelholz played both matches, as they beat Vllaznia 2–1 on aggregate. In the third qualifying round they beat Palermo on the away goals rule, but in the play-off round they were knocked out by Stoke City. In the league he was regular starter, but in August he suffered a torn lateral knee ligament which kept him out for more than six months. Again, in the following seasons Schindelholz suffered various injuries, a tear in the cruciate ligament, torn muscle fibres and each time was out for longer periods.

In 2017, he left Thun and signed for FC Luzern for the 2017–18 Super League season. Injuries led him to not making his debut with the club for 10 months. After the season, with only two league appearances he left the club.

On 5 June 2018 it was announced that Schindelholz had signed with FC Aarau under his former Basel youth team coach Patrick Rahmen for the 2018–19 Challenge League season. The season started really badly, the team lost nine of the first eleven games, Schindelholz was out over a month, but after recovering he returned and with a run of 15 successive games undefeated, they ended the season in second position.

In the summer of 2020, Schindelholz was suspected to be suffering from pneumonia, however it was ultimately diagnosed as cancer.

== Private life ==
Nicolas Schindelholz was married, and the couple had four children. His brother Stefan was also youth footballer with FC Basel but decided to play at amateur level with SC Dornach. The Schindelholz brothers inherited their fascination for football from their parents. Their father, a businessman, is an influential figure at his hometown club SC Dornach. He was a coach, sports director and then president. Father Schindelholz has been involved in the club for years.

== Death ==
Schindelholz died from lung cancer on 18 September 2022, at the age of 34. Tributes were paid from around the football community, including by former clubs FC Aarau and FC Thun.

== Titles and honours ==
FC Basel

- Swiss champion at U-18 level: 2005–06
- Swiss Cup at U-19/U-18 level: 2005–06
- Swiss champion at U-21 level: 2006–07, 2007–08, 2008–09

Thun

- Swiss Challenge League: 2009–10

== Sources ==
- Josef Zindel (2018). FC Basel 1893. Die ersten 125 Jahre (in German). Basel: Friedrich Reinhardt Verlag. ISBN 978-3-7245-2305-5.
