= Roland Bättig =

Swiss footballer (born 1979)

Personal information
- Full name: Roland Bättig
- Date of birth: 28 July 1979 (age 47)
- Place of birth: Switzerland
- Height: 1.80 m (5 ft 11 in)
- Position: Midfielder

Senior career*
Years	Team	Apps	(Gls)
1997–1999	FC Schötz	-	(-)
1999–2000	SC Kriens	12	(0)
2000–2001	FC Schötz	26	(4)
2001–2004	Neuchâtel Xamax	81	(1)
2004–2006	FC Aarau	45	(1)
2006–2007	SC Kriens	15	(0)
2007–2008	Neuchâtel Xamax	26	(0)
2008	→ FC Luzern (loan)	13	(0)
2008–2009	AC Bellinzona	0	(0)
2008	→ Calcio Como (loan)	0	(0)
2009–2014	FC Thun	49	(0)
- * Club domestic league appearances and goals as of 20 December 2010 ‡ National team caps and goals as of 20 December 2010

Roland Bättig (born 28 July 1979) is a former Swiss professional footballer who last played as a midfielder for FC Thun in the Swiss Super League.
