= Matías Vitkieviez =

Uruguayan footballer (born 1985)

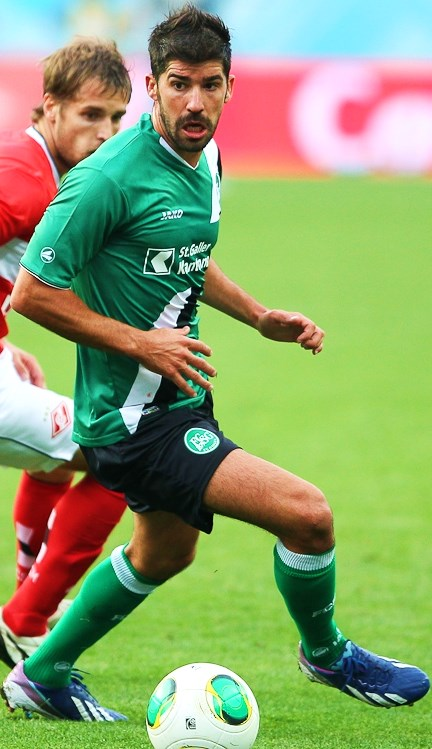

Personal information
- Full name: Matías Vitkieviez
- Date of birth: 16 May 1985 (age 41)
- Place of birth: Montevideo, Uruguay
- Height: 1.78 m (5 ft 10 in)
- Positions: Winger; second striker

Team information
- Current team: Étoile Carouge
- Number: 7

Youth career
- 1998–1999: Nacional
- 1999–2000: U.S. Meinier
- 2000–2001: U.S. Carouge
- 2001–2002: Étoile Carouge

Senior career*
Years	Team	Apps	(Gls)
2002–2003	Louhans-Cuiseaux	6	(1)
2003–2005	Guingamp B	28	(7)
2005–2006	Étoile Carouge	23	(13)
2006–2011	Servette	130	(34)
2012–2015	Young Boys	26	(4)
2013	→ Servette (loan)	16	(3)
2013–2014	→ FC St. Gallen (loan)	30	(2)
2015–2018	Servette	80	(9)
2018–	Étoile Carouge	25	(10)

International career^{‡}
2006	Switzerland U-21	1	(0)
2012–	Switzerland	1	(0)
- * Club domestic league appearances and goals as of 9 November 2019 ‡ National team caps and goals as of 29 February 2012

Matías Vitkieviez (born 16 May 1985) is a Uruguayan-born Swiss association footballer who plays for Étoile Carouge.

== Early life ==
Vitkieviez lived in Montevideo, Uruguay, until 1999 when together with his mother and brother he emigrated to Geneva, Switzerland because of family economic problems. Geneva being the city where Vitkieviez's grandfather once lived. Vitkieviez's grandfather is famous Polish painter Stanisław Witkiewicz and his son Stanisław Ignacy Witkiewicz. Matias Vitkieviez is the brother of Mateo Vitkieviez and Nicolas Vitkieviez.

== Club career ==
Vitkieviez started his football in Switzerland in the Étoile Carouge youth department. He started his senior football in 2003 in France with Louhans-Cuiseaux, but after just a few months transferred to EA Guingamp. One year later he returned to Étoile Carouge.

In August 2006, Vitkieviez was transferred to Swiss Challenge League side Servette. The team achieved promotion to the Top League in the 2010–11season. He made his debut in the top division on 23 July 2011 against Zürich in the 2–1 away win.

On 16 January 2012 his transfer to BSC Young Boys was announced, for the sum of €100,000. On 10 January 2013, he was loaned back to his former club Servette, the contract dated up until 30 June 2013.

== International career ==
He debuted in the Swiss national team on 29 February 2012 in Bern against Argentina in a friendly match replacing Eren Derdiyok in the minute 87'.

== Statistics ==
Club	Season	League	Domestic League		Domestic Cups		Continental Cups		Total	
Club	Season	League	Apps	Goals	Apps	Goals	Apps	Goals	Apps	Goals
Louhans-Cuiseaux	2002–2003	Championnat National	6	1	-	-	-	-	6	1
Guingamp B	2003–2004	Championnat de France amateur	7	0	-	-	-	-	7	0
Guingamp B	2004–2005	Championnat de France amateur	21	7	-	-	-	-	21	7
Étoile Carouge	2005–2006	1. Liga Promotion	23	13	-	-	-	-	23	13
Servette	2006–2007	Swiss Challenge League	21	4	-	-	-	-	21	4
Servette	2007–2008	Swiss Challenge League	27	7	-	-	-	-	27	7
Servette	2008–2009	Swiss Challenge League	22	7	-	-	-	-	22	7
Servette	2009–2010	Swiss Challenge League	16	0	1	0	-	-	17	0
Servette	2010–2011	Swiss Challenge League	28	11	3	1	-	-	31	12
Servette	2011–2012	Swiss Super League	16	5	2	1	-	-	18	6
Young Boys	2011–2012	Swiss Super League	13	4	-	-	-	-	13	4
Young Boys	2012–2013	Swiss Super League	13	0	1	1	5	0	19	1
Servette	2012–2013	Swiss Super League	16	3	-	-	-	-	16	3
Total	Career		229	62	7	3	5	0	241	65

== Honours ==
'Servette

- 2010–11 Swiss Challenge League runner-up
