= Saïf Ghezal =

Tunisian footballer and manager

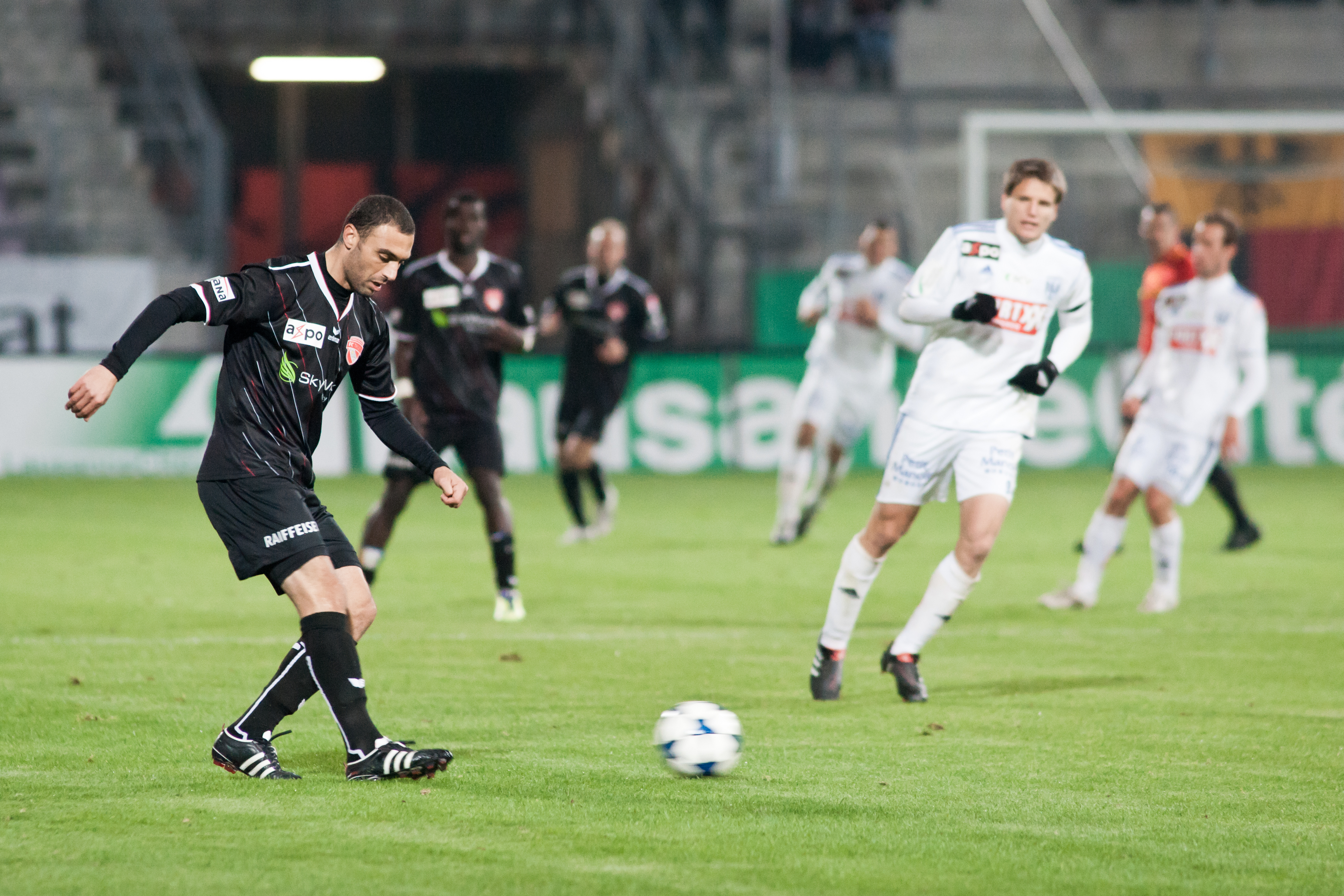
- Ghezal with FC Thun in 2011

Personal information
- Date of birth: 30 June 1981 (age 45)
- Place of birth: M'saken, Tunisia
- Height: 1.90 m (6 ft 3 in)
- Position: Defender

Team information
- Current team: (manager)

Senior career*
| Years | Team | Apps | (Gls) |
| 2001–2008 | ES Sahel | 217 | (11) |
| 2008–2009 | Young Boys | 62 | (9) |
| 2010 | Ahli Jeddah | 4 | (0) |
| 2010–2011 | ES Sahel | 35 | (1) |
| 2011–2013 | FC Thun | 42 | (1) |
| 2013–2014 | ES Sahel | 25 | (2) |

International career
| 2004–2009 | Tunisia | 19 | (0) |

Managerial career
- 2017: ES Sahel (assistant)
- 2018–2019: Hammam-Sousse
- 2019: AS Rejiche
- 2019: SS Sfaxien
- 2020: Beni-Khalled
- 2021: Stade Gabèsien
- * Club domestic league appearances and goals

Saïf Ghezal (Arabic: سيف غزال; born 30 June 1981) is a Tunisian football manager and former player.

== Club career ==
Ghezal was born in M'saken. He previously played for Étoile Sportive du Sahel, and participated at the 2007 FIFA Club World Cup. In summer 2008 he moved from Étoile Sportive du Sahel to Swiss club BSC Young Boys. Ghezal signed for Al-Ahli Jeddah on 29 December 2009.

== International career ==
Ghezal played for the Tunisia national team during qualifying matches for the 2010 FIFA World Cup.

== Coaching career ==
On 5 February 2020, Ghezal was appointed manager of ES Beni-Khalled.
