= Andreas Wittwer =

Swiss footballer (born 1990)

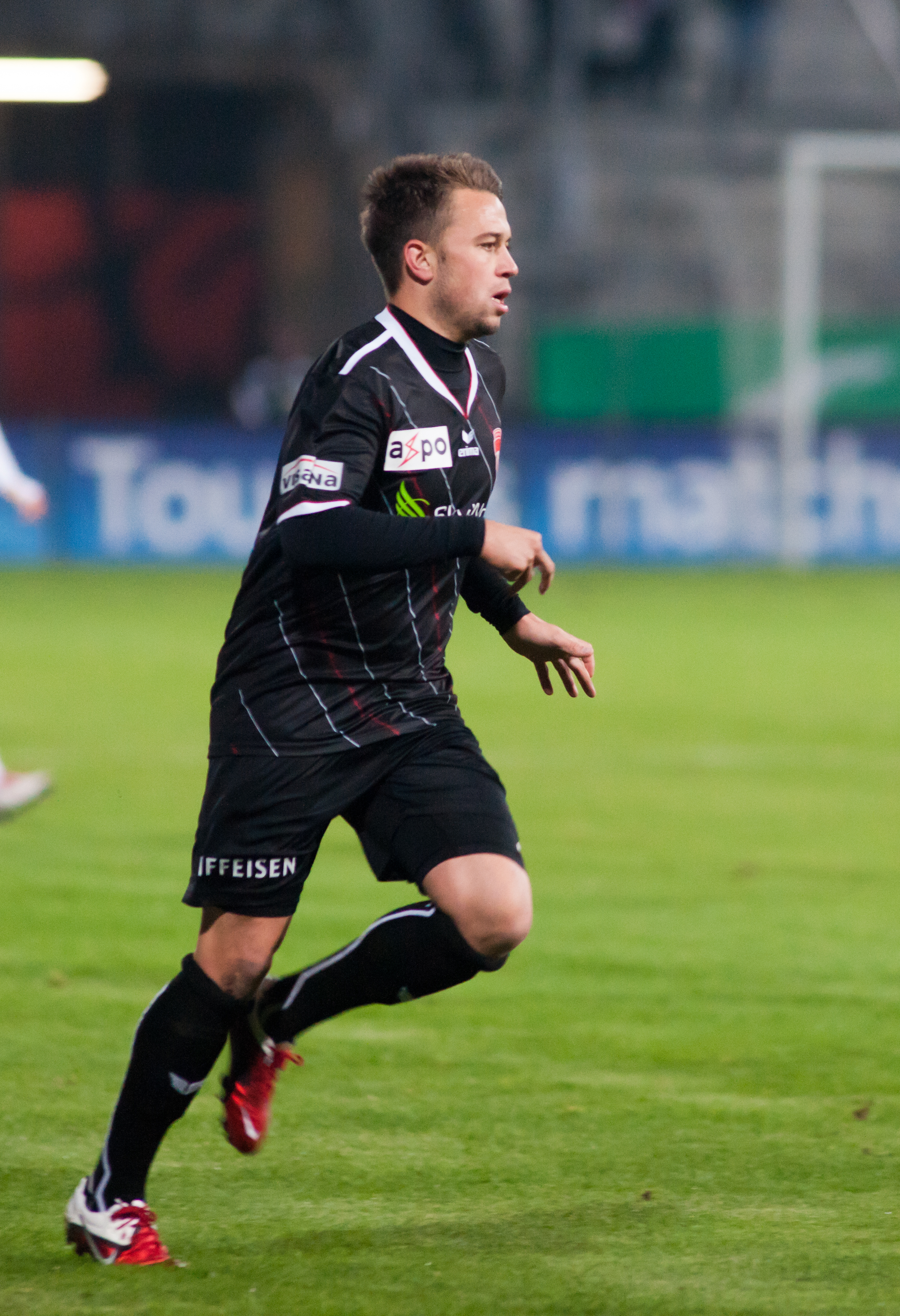

Personal information
- Date of birth: 5 October 1990 (age 36)
- Place of birth: Bern, Switzerland
- Height: 1.73 m (5 ft 8 in)
- Position: Left back

Youth career
- 1999–2007: Young Boys

Senior career*
Years	Team	Apps	(Gls)
2007–2016	Thun	184	(11)
2016–2019	St. Gallen	93	(2)
2019–2020	Grasshopper	27	(3)
2020–2021	Winterthur	30	(3)

International career
2012	Switzerland U21	1	(0)
- * Club domestic league appearances and goals as of 20 May 2021

Andreas Wittwer (born 5 October 1990) is a Swiss professional footballer who plays as a left back.

== Career statistics ==
As of 9 February 2018

Appearances and goals by club, season and competition
Club	Season	League			Cup		Other		Total	
Club	Season	Division	Apps	Goals	Apps	Goals	Apps	Goals	Apps	Goals
Thun	2009–10	Swiss Challenge League	21	2	2	1	0	0	23	3
Thun	2010–11	Swiss Super League	26	0	2	0	0	0	28	0
Thun	2011–12	Swiss Super League	28	2	0	0	6 (Note: Appearances in UEFA Europa League)	1	34	3
Thun	2012–13	Swiss Super League	30	2	2	0	0	0	32	2
Thun	2013–14	Swiss Super League	27	2	4	1	11	0	42	3
Thun	2014–15	Swiss Super League	32	2	2	0	0	0	34	2
Thun	2015–16	Swiss Super League	20	1	3	1	6	0	29	2
Thun	Total		184	11	15	3	23	1	222	15
St. Gallen	2016–17	Swiss Super League	30	2	2	0	0	0	32	2
St. Gallen	2017–18	Swiss Super League	17	0	2	0	0	0	19	0
St. Gallen	Total		47	2	4	0	0	0	51	2
Career totals			231	13	19	3	23	1	254	14
