= Muhamed Demiri =

Macedonian footballer (born 1985)

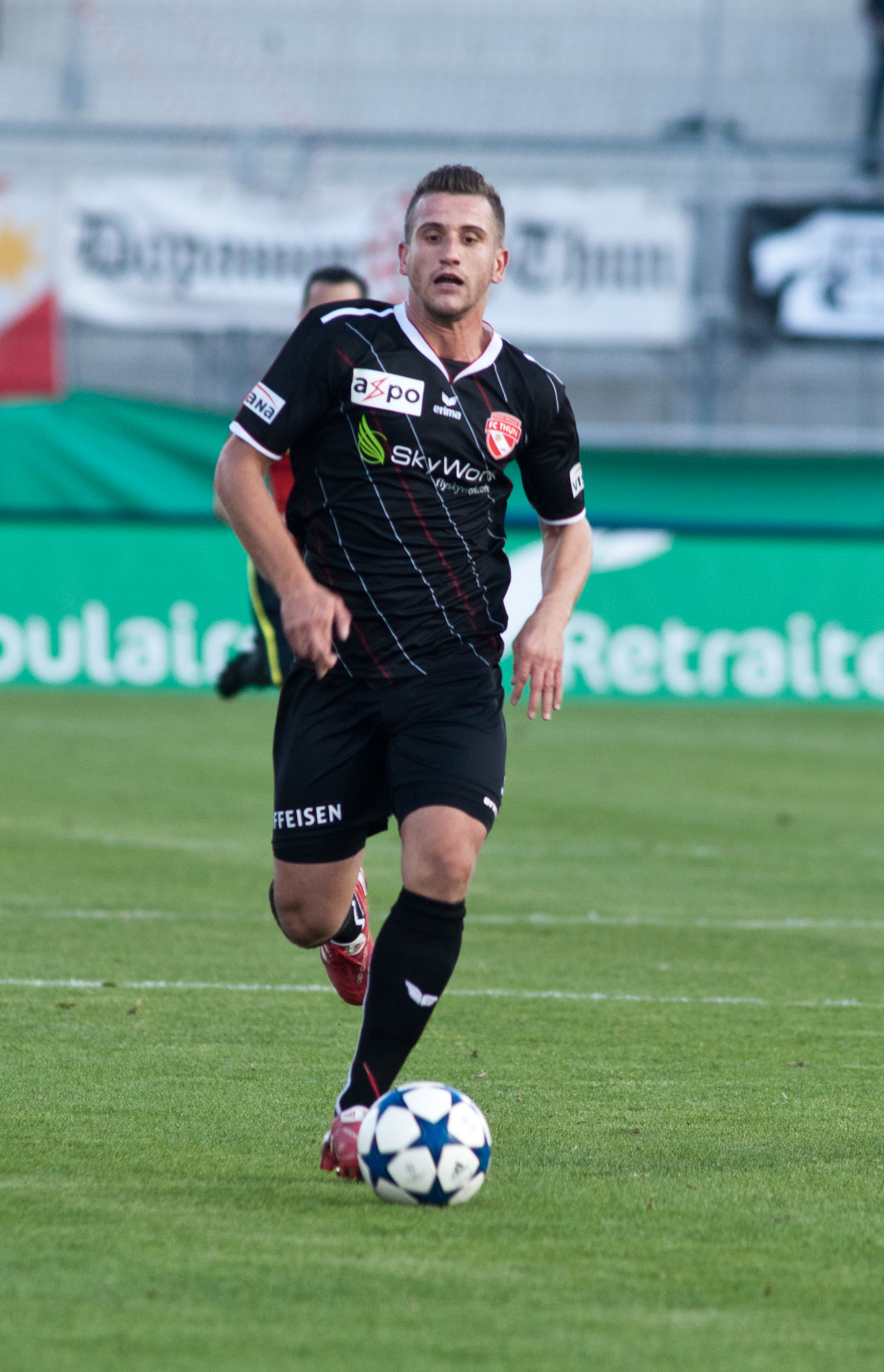

Personal information
- Full name: Muhamed Demiri
- Date of birth: 20 November 1985 (age 40)
- Place of birth: Bern, Switzerland
- Height: 1.81 m (5 ft 11 1/2 in)
- Position: Defensive midfielder

Senior career*
Years	Team	Apps	(Gls)
2004–2009	Concordia Basel	93	(2)
2009–2013	Thun	129	(4)
2013–2015	St. Gallen	26	(0)
2015–2016	Old Boys	19	(0)
2017	Schaffhausen	15	(0)
2018	Old Boys	3	(0)

International career^{‡}
2010–2014	North Macedonia	25	(0)
- * Club domestic league appearances and goals as of 9 March 2017 (UTC) ‡ National team caps and goals as of 16 November 2014

Muhamed Demiri (Macedonian: Мухамед Демири) (born 20 November 1985) is a retired footballer. Born in Switzerland, he represented North Macedonia at international level.

== International career ==
In June 2010 Demiri (who is of ethnic Albanian origin) expressed to the sports media that his desire was to play for the Albania national football team, however he then accepted the call from Macedonia.

He made his senior debut for Macedonia in a December 2010 friendly match away against China and has earned a total of 25 caps, scoring no goals. His final international was a November 2014 European Championship qualification match against Slovakia in Skopje.
