= Nahuel di Pierro =

Argentine operatic bass

Nahuel di Pierro (born 1984) is an Argentine operatic bass.

Nahuel di Pierro was born in Buenos Aires in 1984. He studied there at the Artistic Institute of the Teatro Colón, followed by the Atelier Lyrique of the Paris Opera.

For the Royal Opera, he has sung Colline in La bohème in 2012, and in 2014/15 Masetto in Don Giovanni.

In 2018, he sang the title role in Don Giovanni with the Israeli Opera.
