= Mathieu Salamand =

French footballer (born 1991)

Personal information
- Full name: Mathieu Salamand
- Date of birth: 17 April 1991 (age 35)
- Place of birth: Lyon, France
- Height: 1.80 m (5 ft 11 in)
- Position: Midfielder

Team information
- Current team: Olympique Lyonnais
- Number: 10

Youth career
- 2004–2010: Olympique Lyonnais

Senior career*
Years	Team	Apps	(Gls)
2010–2014	FC Thun	75	(21)
2014–	FC Biel-Bienne	62	(24)
- * Club domestic league appearances and goals as of 22:28, 14 February 2014 (UTC)

Mathieu Salamand (born 17 April 1991) is a French Professional football player who plays for Olympique lyonnais in the Futsal Team.

Mathieu is born in Lyon (France) and made his formation at Olympique Lyonnais from 2004 to 2010 before leaving in Switzerland to the Swiss Super League club, FC Thun (D1). After 4 years and a participation to the Europa League during season 2013/14, Mathieu was transferred to FC Biel/Bienne in Challenge League (D2).
