= Christian Schneuwly =

Swiss footballer (born 1988)

Personal information
- Date of birth: 7 February 1988 (age 38)
- Place of birth: Wünnewil, Switzerland
- Height: 1.78 m (5 ft 10 in)
- Position: Midfielder

Team information
- Current team: Düdingen
- Number: 19

Youth career
- –2007: Young Boys

Senior career*
Years	Team	Apps	(Gls)
2007–2013	Young Boys	77	(6)
2008–2009	→ Biel-Bienne (loan)	27	(6)
2011–2012	→ Thun (loan)	30	(8)
2013–2014	Thun	47	(8)
2015–2016	Zürich	30	(3)
2016–2019	Luzern	119	(14)
2019–2021	Lausanne-Sport	38	(7)
2021	Stade Lausanne Ouchy	14	(1)
2021–	Düdingen	8	(1)
- * Club domestic league appearances and goals as of 16 October 2021

Christian Schneuwly (born 7 February 1988) is a Swiss professional footballer who plays as a midfielder for fifth-tier 2. Liga Interregional club Düdingen.

== Personal life ==
His brother Marco is also a footballer. The siblings have played together for Young Boys, Thun and Luzern.
