= Enrico Schirinzi =

Swiss footballer (born 1984)

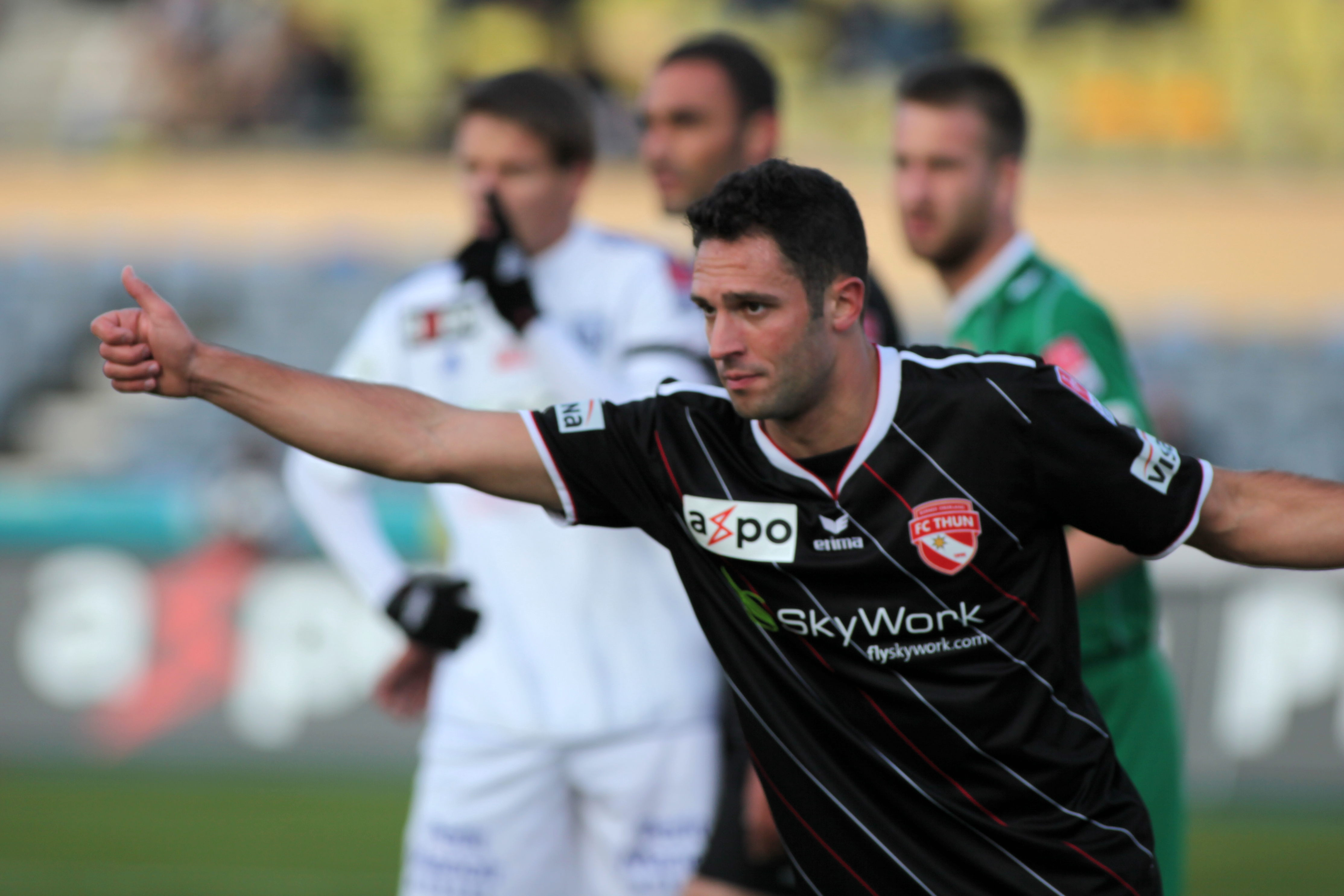

Personal information
- Full name: Enrico Schirinzi
- Date of birth: 14 November 1984 (age 41)
- Place of birth: Bern, Switzerland
- Height: 1.78 m (5 ft 10 in)
- Position: Midfielder

Youth career
- 1999–2003: BSC Young Boys

Senior career*
Years	Team	Apps	(Gls)
2003–2008	FC Wohlen	94	(9)
2008–2009	FC Luzern	11	(0)
2009	FC Lugano	11	(1)
2009–2010	FC Wohlen	29	(5)
2010–2017	FC Thun	158	(17)
2017–2018	FC Vaduz	31	(2)
2018	FC Breitenrain Bern	15	(0)
- * Club domestic league appearances and goals

Enrico Schirinzi (born 14 November 1984) is a former Swiss footballer.

== Career ==
Raised in the BSC Young Boys, he played the first three years in FC Wohlen, in the second series, where he collected 85 appearances and 8 goals in the league.

In the 2008-2009 season he made his debut in top flight playing 11 games with FC Luzern. In January he was transferred to Lugano, in the Challenge League, where he played 11 games (with one goal).

Back at Wohlen for the 2009-2010 season, after 59 appearances and 15 goals, he decided not to renew with the Swiss team.

After a period under test with Aston Villa in which he was not offered a contract, he signed with FC Thun on his return to Switzerland.
