= 2013–14 Grasshopper Club Zurich season =

Grasshopper Club Zurich
2013–14 season
- Chairman: André Dosé (until December); Stephan Anliker (from February)
- Manager: Michael Skibbe
- Stadium: Letzigrund
- Super League: 2nd
- Swiss Cup: Quarter-finals
- UEFA Champions League: Third qualifying round
- UEFA Europa League: Play-off round
- Top goalscorer: League: Shkëlzen Gashi (19); All: Shkëlzen Gashi (20)
- Highest home attendance: 16,900; 5 April 2014 v Zürich (league)
- Lowest home attendance: 3,200; 8 March 2014 v Lausanne (league)

== Matches ==
=== Legend ===
Win Draw Loss Postponed

=== Friendly matches ===
==== Preseason ====
22 June 2013	Grasshopper Club Zurich (Switzerland)	1 – 1	(Switzerland) FC Winterthur	Niederhasli
16:00 CEST	Gutierrez 83'	(Report) (in German)	49' Radice	Stadium: GC-Campus; Attendance: 1'200

28 June 2013	SPG Arlberg (Austria)	0 – 13	(Switzerland) Grasshopper Club Zurich	Pettneu am Arlberg, Austria
18:00 CEST		(Report) (in German)	1', 30', 60' S. Lang; 9', 17' Vonlanthen; 13' Ben Khalifa; 18' Toko; 19' Coulibaly; 35', 41' Anatole; 37', 40' Gashi; 43' Feltscher	Stadium: Kunstrasenplatz; Attendance: 150

29 June 2013	FC Bischofszell (Switzerland)	0 – 13	(Switzerland) Grasshopper Club Zurich	Bischofszell
16:00 CEST		(Report) (in German)	3' (pen.) 82' Salatić; 15' M. Lang; 15' Feltscher; 40' Vonlanthen; 49' Toko; 51', 80' S. Lang; 58' Coulibaly; 61', 88' Ben Khalifa; 62' (pen.) Abrashi; 79' Pavlović	Stadium: Bruggfeld; Attendance: 800

17 July 2013	Grasshopper Club Zurich (Switzerland)	1 – 3	(Turkey) Akhisar Belediyespor	Niederhasli
18:00 CEST	Anatole 17'	(Report) (in German)	48' Özcan; 53' Aladağ; 90' Özer	Stadium: GC-Campus; Attendance: 500; Referee: Urs Schnyder

==== Mid-season (fall) ====
26 September 2013	Grasshopper Club Zurich (Switzerland)	2 – 0	(Switzerland) FC Wohlen	Niederhasli
16:00 CEST	Anatole 32'; Murtisi 83'	(Report) (in German)		Stadium: GC-Campus; Attendance: 300; Referee: Pascal Erlachner

11 October 2013	Grasshopper Club Zurich (Switzerland)	6 – 0	(Switzerland) Zug 94	Niederhasli
18:30 CEST	Feuchter 31' (o.g.); Anatole 54', 57'; Caio 80'; Feltscher 82'; S. Lang 84'	(Report) (in German)		Stadium: GC-Campus; Attendance: 95; Referee: Fedayi San

14 November 2013	Grasshopper Club Zurich (Switzerland)	2 – 2	(Switzerland) FC Lugano	Niederhasli
15:30 CET	Oliveira 48'; S. Lang 58'	(Report) (in German)	69' Santillo; 73' Guarino	Stadium: GC-Campus; Attendance: 100; Referee: Urs Schnyder

==== Winter break ====
10 January 2014	Grasshopper Club Zurich (Switzerland)	4 – 0	(Switzerland) FC Winterthur	Niederhasli
14:30 CET	Salatić 5'; S. Lang 71'; Ben Khalifa 74', 76'	(Report) (in German)		Stadium: GC-Campus; Attendance: 220; Referee: Adrien Jaccottet

18 January 2014	Grasshopper Club Zurich (Switzerland)	0 – 1	(Germany) 1. FC Nürnberg	La Cala de Mijas, Spain
16:00 CET		(Report) (in German)	87' Drmić	Stadium: La Cala Resort; Attendance: 250; Referee: Pedro Manuel Albacete (Spain)

22 January 2014	Grasshopper Club Zurich (Switzerland)	1 – 1	(Croatia) HNK Rijeka	San Pedro de Alcántara, Spain
16:00 CET	Salatić 89' (pen.)	(Report) (in German)	67' Krstanović	Stadium: Marbella Football Center; Attendance: 110; Referee: David Panchito Nastal-Emerguerrez (Spain)

26 January 2014	Grasshopper Club Zurich (Switzerland)	3 – 1	(Switzerland) FC Wil	Niederhasli
14:30 CET	Salatić 15' (pen.); Ben Khalifa 16'; Gashi 37'	(Report) (in German)	4' Muslin	Stadium: GC-Campus; Attendance: 500; Referee: Sascha Amhof

==== Tournaments ====
===== 3-Städte-Turnier Uster =====
Game duration 45 min

2 July 2013	Selection Zürich Oberland (Switzerland)	1 – 6	(Switzerland) Grasshopper Club Zurich	Uster
19:00 CEST	Bürger 31'	(Report) (in German)	2', 36', 43' Tarashaj; 11' Anatole; 17' Brahimi; 32' Gashi	Stadium: Buchholz; Attendance: 500

2 July 2013	FC Winterthur (Switzerland)	0 – 1	(Switzerland) Grasshopper Club Zurich	Uster
20:00 CEST		(Report) (in German)	19' Pavlović	Stadium: Buchholz; Attendance: 500

===== Uhrencup =====
6 July 2013	Grasshopper Club Zurich (Switzerland)	0 – 1	(Serbia) Red Star Belgrade	Grenchen
19:30 CEST		(Report) (in German)	30' Kasalica	Stadium: Stadion Brühl; Attendance: 4'326; Referee: Adrien Jaccottet

9 July 2013	Grasshopper Club Zurich (Switzerland)	1 – 1 (5–6 p)	(Germany) Fortuna Düsseldorf	Grenchen
19:30 CEST	Feltscher 57'	(Report) (in German)	36' Benschop	Stadium: Stadion Brühl; Attendance: 1'691; Referee: Tomasz Superczynski
	Penalties
	Pavlović (penalty scored); Gashi (penalty missed); Feltscher (penalty scored); Anatole (penalty scored); Abrashi (penalty scored); Vonlanthen (penalty scored); Gülen (penalty missed)		(penalty scored) Reisinger; (penalty scored) Genki; (penalty missed) Halloran; (penalty scored) Paurević; (penalty scored) Bodzek; (penalty scored) Gianniotas; (penalty scored) Ramírez

===== Hallenmasters 2014 =====
Game duration 2x12 min (indoor tournament)

5 January 2014	Grasshopper Club Zurich (Switzerland)	6 – 3	(Switzerland) FC Biel-Bienne	Winterthur
13:00 CET	Ben Khalifa 2'; Dingsdag 5'; Anatole 8'; Bauer 9'; Caio 10'; S. Lang 21'	(Report) (in German)	4' Siegrist; 13' Di Nardo; 24' Pazeller	Stadium: Eishalle Deutweg; Attendance: 2'000

5 January 2014	FC Winterthur (Switzerland)	5 – 2	(Switzerland) Grasshopper Club Zurich	Winterthur
14:00 CET	D'Angelo 5', 19'; Radice 9'; Grether 14'; Pacar 23'	(Report) (in German)	7' Brahimi; 18' Caio	Stadium: Eishalle Deutweg; Attendance: 2'000

5 January 2014	FC Aarau (Switzerland)	7 – 8	(Switzerland) Grasshopper Club Zurich	Winterthur
14:35 CET	Sascha Stauch 4', 13'; Martignoni 5'; Taini 6' (o.g.); González 12'; Burki 21'; Teichmann 22'	(Report) (in German)	1', 3' Anatole; 6', 10', 11' Bauer; 9', 17' Caio; 18' Feltscher	Stadium: Eishalle Deutweg; Attendance: 2'000

5 January 2014	Grasshopper Club Zurich (Switzerland)	6 – 6 (3 – 4 p)	(Liechtenstein) FC Vaduz	Winterthur
16:35 CET	Ben Khalifa 2', 6'; Anatole 9'; Mustafi 14'; Dingsdag 19'; Caio 23'	(Report) (in German)	7' Untersee; 8', 11' Sara; 12', 20' Cecchini; 13' Sutter	Stadium: Eishalle Deutweg; Attendance: 2'000
	Penalties
	Caio (penalty missed); Dingsdag (penalty scored); Abrashi (penalty scored); Ben Khalifa (penalty scored)		(penalty scored) Untersee; (penalty scored) Grippo; (penalty scored) Sara; (penalty scored) Handžić

=== Super League ===
Kickoff times are in CET

==== League results and fixtures ====
14 July 2013 1	FC St. Gallen	0 – 2	Grasshopper Club Zurich	St. Gallen
16:00	Besle (yellow card) 12'	(Report) (in German)	(yellow card) 22' Grichting; (yellow card) 32' (goal) 90' Hajrović; (yellow card) 81' Abrashi; 66' Gashi	Stadium: AFG Arena; Attendance: 14'668; Referee: Adrien Jaccottet (Basel)

21 July 2013 2	Grasshopper Club Zurich	1 – 1	FC Basel	Zürich
16:00	Vilotić (yellow card) 12'; Hajrović 48'; Ben Khalifa (yellow card) 52'	(Report) (in German)	20' Schär; (yellow card) 52' Xhaka; (yellow card) 59' Frei; (yellow card) 60' Safari	Stadium: Letzigrund; Attendance: 9'279; Referee: Alain Bieri (Bern)

27 July 2013 3	Grasshopper Club Zurich	4 – 2	FC Aarau	Zürich
19:45	Hajrović 5', 49'; Grichting (yellow card) 40'; Salatić (yellow card) 52'; Ben Khalifa 74'; Gashi 85'	(Report) (in German)	13' (yellow card) 64' Ioniță; (yellow card) 26' Burki; 31' Staubli; (yellow card) 37' Jäckle; (yellow card) 74' Mouangue; (yellow card) 85' Garat	Stadium: Letzigrund; Attendance: 5'270; Referee: Stephan Klossner (Willisau)

3 August 2013 4	FC Lausanne-Sport	0 - 0	Grasshopper Club Zurich	Lausanne
19:45	Katz (yellow card) 9'	(Report) (in German)		Stadium: Stade Olympique de la Pontaise; Attendance: 4'900; Referee: Fedayi San (Mülligen)

10 August 2013 5	Grasshopper Club Zurich	0 - 0	FC Sion	Zürich
19:45	Vilotić (yellow card) 56'; Abrashi (yellow card) 90'	(Report) (in German)	(yellow card) 49' Miloš Bakrač; (yellow card) 54' Kouassi; (yellow card) 90' Herea	Stadium: Letzigrund; Attendance: 4'200; Referee: Sascha Amhof (Rohr AG)

25 August 2013 6	BSC Young Boys	1 - 2	Grasshopper Club Zurich	Bern
13:45	von Bergen (yellow card) 29'; Costanzo 34' (pen.); Gerndt (yellow card) 54'	(Report) (in German)	(yellow card) 29' Salatić; 30' Vilotić; (yellow card) 33' M. Lang; (yellow card) 35' Hajrović; 86' Caio; (yellow card) 90+2' Gashi	Stadium: Stade de Suisse; Attendance: 25'031; Referee: Stephan Studer (Lausanne)

22 September 2013 8	Grasshopper Club Zurich	2 - 1	FC Thun	Zürich
13:45	Hajrović 43' (pen.); Salatić (yellow card) 45'; Pavlović (yellow card) 52'; Vilotić 54'; M. Lang (yellow card) 58'	(Report) (in German)	(yellow card) 42' Hediger; (yellow card) 44' Sanogo, Jr. (yellow card) 63' Cássio; 83' Sadik	Stadium: Letzigrund; Attendance: 5'200; Referee: Nikolaj Hänni (Sargans)

25 September 2013 9	FC Luzern	0 - 2	Grasshopper Club Zurich	Lucerne
19:45	Rangelov (red card) 7'; Hochstrasser (yellow card) 33'; Stahel (yellow card) 83'	(Report) (in German)	(yellow card) 9' Toko; 45' Caio; 62' Anatole	Stadium: Swissporarena; Attendance: 10'581; Referee: Adrien Jaccottet (Basel)

28 September 2013 10	Grasshopper Club Zurich	0 - 1	FC St. Gallen	Zürich
19:45	Abrashi (yellow card) 21'; Hajrović (red card) 55'; Salatić (yellow card) 57'; Pavlović (yellow card) 57'	(Report) (in German)	32' Lenjani; (yellow card) 44' (yellow card) 47' (red card) Nater; (yellow card) 58' Nushi; (yellow card) 85' Demiri	Stadium: Letzigrund; Attendance: 6'780; Referee: Fedayi San (Mülligen)

6 October 2013 11	FC Thun	1 - 1	Grasshopper Club Zurich	Thun
13:45	Hediger (yellow card) 18'; C. Schneuwly (yellow card) 45' (goal) 64'	(Report) (in German)	(yellow card) 24' Ben Khalifa; (yellow card) 34' Anatole; (yellow card) 50' (red card) 90+4' Vilotić; (yellow card) 54' Gashi; (yellow card) 63' Bürki; 66' (o.g.) Sanogo, Jr. (yellow card) 78' Feltscher; (yellow card) 78' Abrashi	Stadium: Arena Thun; Attendance: 5'314; Referee: Alain Bieri (Bern)

20 October 2013 12	Grasshopper Club Zurich	2 - 0	FC Lausanne-Sport	Zürich
13:45	Gashi 55' (pen.); Caio 61'; Vonlanthen (yellow card) 82'	(Report) (in German)	(yellow card) 60' Chakhsi; (yellow card) 88' Cuéhoud	Stadium: Letzigrund; Attendance: 4'200; Referee: Stephan Klossner (Willisau)

27 October 2013 13	FC Sion	2 - 0	Grasshopper Club Zurich	Sion
13:45	Basha (yellow card) 6'; Assifuah 13'; Vanczák (yellow card) 42'; Yartey 90+3'	(Report) (in German)	(yellow card) 28' Gashi	Stadium: Stade de Tourbillon; Attendance: 7'500; Referee: Pascal Erlachner (Wangen bei Olten)

30 October 2013 7	Grasshopper Club Zurich	3 - 1	FC Zürich	Zürich
19:45	Caio 19', 83'; Nzuzi 56'; Vilotić (yellow card) 68'	(Report) (in German)	(yellow card) 50' Mariani; 69' (o.g.) Vilotić	Stadium: Letzigrund; Attendance: 13'600; Referee: Alain Bieri (Bern)

3 November 2013 14	Grasshopper Club Zurich	0 - 1	BSC Young Boys	Zürich
16:00	Nzuzi (yellow card) 52'; Pavlović (yellow card) 76'	(Report) (in German)	(yellow card) 50' (yellow-red card) Veškovac; 74' Gerndt; (yellow card) 89' Frey	Stadium: Letzigrund; Attendance: 9'400; Referee: Sébastien Pache (Prilly)

24 November 2013 15	FC Aarau	2 - 4	Grasshopper Club Zurich	Aarau
13:45	Garat 17'; N'Ganga 23' (yellow card) 60'	(Report) (in German)	32' Caio; 59', 66' Gashi; (yellow card) 74' Toko; 82' Anatole	Stadium: Stadion Brügglifeld; Attendance: 5'134; Referee: Nikolaj Hänni (Sargans)

30 November 2013 16	Grasshopper Club Zurich	1 - 2	FC Luzern	Zürich
19:45	Ben Khalifa 65'; Abrashi (yellow card) 68'; Toko (yellow card) 71'	(Report) (in German)	(yellow card) 43' Sarr; (yellow card) 48' Lustenberger; (yellow card) 54' Thiesson; 42' Raneglov; (yellow card) 76' Stahel; 86' Kahraba	Stadium: Letzigrund; Attendance: 5'100; Referee: Adrien Jaccottet (Basel)

7 December 2013 17	FC Basel	1 - 1	Grasshopper Club Zurich	Basel
19:45	Sio (yellow card) 13' (goal) 90+3'; Xhaka (yellow card) 40'	(Report) (in German)	(yellow card) 33' (goal) 36' Hajrović; (yellow card) 90' Abrashi	Stadium: St. Jakob-Park; Attendance: 28'241; Referee: Stephan Klossner (Willisau)

15 December 2013 18	FC Zürich	1 - 1	Grasshopper Club Zurich	Zürich
16:00	Buff (yellow card) 18'; Gavranović (yellow card) 34'; Rikan (yellow card) 37'; Etoundi 82'	(Report) (in German)	(yellow card) 12' Salatić; (yellow card) 31' Toko; (yellow card) 45' Grichting; 55' Hajrović	Stadium: Letzigrund; Attendance: 12'479; Referee: Stephan Studer (Lausanne)

2 February 2014 19	FC Luzern	1 - 3	Grasshopper Club Zurich	Lucerne
13:45	Puljić (yellow card) 11'; Wiss (yellow card) 24'; Renggli (yellow card) 52' (yellow-red card) (goal) 77'	(Report) (in German)	9' (yellow card) 23' Gashi; 13' Lang; (yellow card) 43' Grichting; (yellow card) 50' Dingsdag; 74' Salatić	Stadium: Swissporarena; Attendance: 10'591; Referee: Stephan Studer (Lausanne)

9 February 2014 20	Grasshopper Club Zurich	1 - 2	FC Aarau	Zürich
13:45	Moritz Bauer (yellow card) 44'; Abrashi (yellow card) 56'; S. Lang (yellow card) 68'; Ben Khalifa 69'	(Report) (in German)	5' Hallenius; (yellow card) 14' Garat; 18' Lüscher; (yellow card) 87' González	Stadium: Letzigrund; Attendance: 4'500; Referee: Pascal Erlachner (Wangen bei Olten)

16 February 2014 21	FC St. Gallen	1 - 5	Grasshopper Club Zurich	St. Gallen
13:45	Montandon 15'; Janjatović (yellow card) 38'; Nushi (red card) 70'; Besle (yellow card) 72'	Summary	(yellow card) 18' Abrashi; 38', 51' (yellow card) 84' Ben Khalifa; 69', 82' Dabbur; (yellow card) 70' M. Lang; 90' Gashi	Stadium: AFG Arena; Attendance: 13'600; Referee: Alain Bieri (Bern)

23 February 2014 22	Grasshopper Club Zurich	1 - 1	FC Basel	Zürich
16:00	Toko (yellow card) 28'; Grichting (yellow card) 39'; Pavlović 51' (yellow card) 75'	Summary	(yellow card) 37' Callà; (yellow card) 53' Díaz; 57' (yellow card) 60' Stocker; (yellow card) 87' Mohamed Elneny; (yellow card) 89' Frei	Stadium: Letzigrund; Attendance: 11'700; Referee: Stephan Klossner (Willisau)

1 March 2014 23	FC Zürich	3 - 1	Grasshopper Club Zurich	Zürich
19:45	Gavranović 15', 60'; Reikan 30' (yellow card) 58'; Jorge Teixeira (yellow card) 45+3'; Pedro Henrique Konzen (yellow card) 78'; Buff (yellow card) 83'	Summary	(yellow card) 17' (goal) 67' Dabbur; (yellow card) 55' Ben Khalifa; (yellow card) 82' Toko; (yellow card) 90+2' Caio	Stadium: Letzigrund; Attendance: 14'243; Referee: Sébastien Pache (Prilly)

8 March 2014 24	Grasshopper Club Zurich	2 - 1	FC Lausanne-Sport	Zürich
19:45	Caio 17'; Gashi (yellow card) 60'; Dabbur 90+1'; S. Lang (yellow card) 90+3'	Summary	(yellow card) 14' Sonnerat; (yellow card) 42' Ravet; (yellow card) 53' (yellow-red card) Plessis; 67' (yellow card) 69' Vukušić	Stadium: Letzigrund; Attendance: 3'200; Referee: Fedayi San (Mülligen)

16 March 2014 25	Grasshopper Club Zurich	4 - 2	FC Sion	Zürich
13:45	Gashi 22', 29', 81'; Pavlović (yellow card) 39'; Jahić (yellow card) 59'; Dabbur 66'	(Report) (in German)	(yellow card) 3' Rüfli; (yellow card) 41' (yellow card) 75' (red card) Perrier; 56', 61' Léo Itaperuna; (yellow card) 69' Herea	Stadium: Letzigrund; Attendance: 4'400; Referee: Sascha Amhof (Rohr AG)

23 March 2014 26	BSC Young Boys	0 - 4	Grasshopper Club Zurich	Bern
16:00	Steffen (yellow card) 10' (yellow card) 43' (red card); Frey (yellow card) 17' (yellow card) 82' (red card); Nuzzolo (yellow card) 84'	(Report) (in German)	(yellow card) 17' Gashi; (yellow card) 41' Jahić; (yellow card) 45' (goal) 80' Dabbur; (yellow card) 63' Abrashi; 65', 87' Caio; (yellow card) 77' Grichting; 90' Anatole	Stadium: Stade de Suisse; Attendance: 16'079; Referee: Adrien Jaccottet (Basel)

30 March 2014 27	FC Thun	1 - 3	Grasshopper Club Zurich	Thun
13:45	Lüthi (yellow card) 56'; Ferreira 57'	(Report) (in German)	56' (pen.) Gashi; 63' Dabbur; 77' M. Lang; (yellow card) 82' Bürki	Stadium: Stockhorn Arena; Attendance: 6'687; Referee: Fedayi San (Mülligen)

5 April 2014 28	Grasshopper Club Zurich	2 - 0	FC Zürich	Zürich
19:45	Caio 37', 47'; Salatić (yellow card) 38'; Pavlović (yellow card) 87'; Toko (yellow card) 90'; Grichting (yellow card) 90+4'	(Report) (in German)	(yellow card) 24' (yellow card) 78' (red card) Kecojević; (yellow card) 31' Buff; (yellow card) 89' Teixeira	Stadium: Letzigrund; Attendance: 16'900; Referee: Stephan Studer (Lausanne)

12 April 2014 29	FC Lausanne-Sport	0 - 2	Grasshopper Club Zurich	Lausanne
19:45	Chakhsi (yellow card) 24'; Mevlja (yellow card) 36'	(Report) (in German)	48' Gashi; (yellow card) 85' Feltscher; 85' Dabbur; (yellow card) 87' Salatić	Stadium: Stade Olympique de la Pontaise; Attendance: 2'850; Referee: Stephan Klossner (Willisau)

16 April 2014 30	Grasshopper Club Zurich	0 - 5	FC Thun	Zürich
19:45	Toko (yellow card) 43'	(Report) (in German)	6' (o.g.) Grichting; (yellow card) 12' Sanogo Jr. 27' Nikçi; 27', 45+2', 60' (yellow card) 32' M. Schneuwly; (yellow card) 82' Lüthi	Stadium: Letzigrund; Attendance: 5'300; Referee: Luca Gut (Giubiasco)

27 April 2014 31	FC Basel	1 - 1	Grasshopper Club Zurich	Basel
16:00	Frei (yellow card) 7'; Stocker 44'; Serey Die (yellow card) 73'; Callà (yellow card) 80'; Sio (yellow card) 85'	Summary	(yellow card) 7' Grichting; 36' Gashi; (yellow card) 55' Dingsdag; (yellow card) 59' Jahić	Stadium: St. Jakob-Park; Attendance: 34'172; Referee: Alain Bieri (Bern)

4 May 2014 32	Grasshopper Club Zurich	5 - 0	BSC Young Boys	Zürich
16:00	Gashi 4', 50', 54' 41' (pen.); Salatić (yellow card) 30'; Ngamukol 90+2'	Summary	(red card) 34' Zárate; (red card) 40' Rochat; (yellow card) 54' von Bergen	Stadium: Letzigrund; Attendance: 9'700; Referee: Pascal Erlachner (Wangen bei Olten)

7 May 2014 33	Grasshopper Club Zurich	2 - 0	FC St. Gallen	Zürich
19:45	Gashi 9' (pen.) (yellow card) 26'; S. Lang 90+2'	Summary	(yellow card) 12' Mutsch; (yellow card) 36' Janjatović; (yellow card) 45+2' Vitkieviez; (yellow card) 50' Lenjani	Stadium: Letzigrund; Attendance: 6'800; Referee: Adrien Jaccottet (Basel)

10 May 2014 34	FC Aarau	4 - 0	Grasshopper Club Zurich	Aarau
19:45	N'Ganga 39'; González (yellow card) 50'; Senger 67'; Lüscher 76'; Martignoni 90+1'	Summary	(red card) 55' Pavlović; (yellow card) 60' Jahić	Stadium: Stadion Brügglifeld; Attendance: 6'298; Referee: Alain Bieri (Bern)

15 May 2014 35	Grasshopper Club Zurich	4 - 1	FC Luzern	Zürich
20:30	Caio 4'; Gashi 5'; Dabbur 9' (yellow card) 78'; Toko (yellow card) 51'; M. Lang 60'	(Report) (in German)	(yellow card) 2' Lustenberger; 40' Winter; (yellow card) 81' Thiesson	Stadium: Letzigrund; Attendance: 4'700; Referee: Sascha Amhof (Rohr AG)

18 May 2014 36	FC Sion	3 - 1	Grasshopper Club Zurich	Sion
16:00	Assifuah 2', 21'; Deana (yellow card) 56'; Follonier 71'; Kouassi (yellow card) 56'	Summary	(yellow card) 24' Bunjaku; 33' Feltscher	Stadium: Stade de Tourbillon; Attendance: 6'900; Referee: Sébastien Pache (Prilly)

==== League table ====
===== Current league table =====
Pos	Team	Pld	W	D	L	GF	GA	GD	Pts	Qualification or relegation
1	Basel (C)	36	19	15	2	70	34	+36	72	Qualification for the Champions League group stage
2	Grasshopper	36	19	8	9	67	43	+24	65	Qualification for the Champions League third qualifying round
3	Young Boys	36	17	8	11	59	50	+9	59	Qualification for the Europa League third qualifying round
4	Luzern	36	15	6	15	48	54	−6	51	Qualification for the Europa League second qualifying round
5	Zürich	36	14	8	14	51	52	−1	50	Qualification for the Europa League play-off round (Note: Zürich won the 2013–14 Swiss Cup, so therefore qualified for the Play-off round of the 2014–15 UEFA Europa League.)

Source: Swiss Super League (in German)
Rules for classification: 1) points; 2) goal difference; 3) number of goals scored.
(C) Champions

===== Results summary =====
Overall								Home						Away					
Pld	W	D	L	GF	GA	GD	Pts	W	D	L	GF	GA	GD	W	D	L	GF	GA	GD
34	18	8	8	62	39	+23	62	9	3	5	30	20	+10	9	5	3	32	19	+13

Last updated: 10 May 2014.
Source: Fussballdaten.de

=== Swiss Cup ===
Kickoff times are in CET

17 August 2013 1st Round	SC Kriens (Canton of Lucerne)	0 - 1	(Canton of Zurich) Grasshopper Club Zurich	Kriens
17:30	Hasanaj (yellow card) 76' (red card)	(Report) (in German)	83' Anatole	Stadium: Stadion Kleinfeld; Attendance: 1'700; Referee: Sandro Schärer (Buttikon SZ)

14 September 2013 2nd Round	Stade Nyonnais (Vaud)	2 - 4 (a.e.t.)	(Canton of Zurich) Grasshopper Club Zurich	Nyon
16:00	Veuthey 30'; Henares 80'; Guinot (yellow card) 89' (red card)	(Report) (in German)	34' Toko; 42' S. Lang; (yellow card) 80' (red card) Bürki; 120' Vilotić; 120+2' Abrashi	Stadium: Centre sportif de Colovray Nyon; Attendance: 1'150; Referee: Urs Schnyder (Escholzmatt)

9 November 2013 3rd Round	FC Köniz (Canton of Bern)	1 - 4	(Canton of Zurich) Grasshopper Club Zurich	Köniz
16:00	Varela 51' (yellow card) 57' (red card)	(Report) (in German)	36' Toko; 74' M. Lang; 83' Gashi; 90+1' Caio	Stadium: Hessgut-Liebefeld; Attendance: 2'850; Referee: Adrien Jaccottet (Basel)

4 December 2013 Quarterfinal	FC Thun (Canton of Bern)	0 - 0 (a.e.t.) (4 - 3 p)	(Canton of Zurich) Grasshopper Club Zurich	Thun
19:00		(Report) (in German)		Stadium: Arena Thun; Attendance: 2'764; Referee: Sébastien Pache (Prilly)
	Penalties
	C. Schneuwly (penalty scored); Lüthi (penalty scored); Wittwer (penalty missed); Martínez (penalty scored); Sadik (penalty scored)		(penalty scored) Toko; (penalty missed) Gashi; (penalty scored) Feltscher; (penalty scored) Dingsdag; (penalty missed) Vilotić

=== UEFA Champions League ===
Kickoff times are in CET

==== Qualifying rounds ====
===== Third qualifying round =====
30 July 2013 1st Leg	Olympique Lyonnais (France)	1 – 0	(Switzerland) Grasshopper Club Zurich	Lyon, France
21:00	Gonalons (yellow card) 40'; Biševac 64'	(Report) (in German)	(yellow card) 58' Vilotić; (yellow card) 90+3' Abrashi	Stadium: Stade de Gerland; Attendance: 27'331; Referee: Hüseyin Göçek (Turkey)

6 August 2013 2nd Leg	Grasshopper Club Zurich (Switzerland)	0 - 1 (0 - 2 agg.)	(France) Olympique Lyonnais	Zürich, Switzerland
21:00	Hajrović (yellow card) 18'; Nzuzi (yellow card) 21'; Vilotić (yellow card) 57'; Pavlović (yellow card) 69'	(Report) (in German)	(yellow card) 13' Miguel Lopes; (yellow card) 31' (goal) 82' Grenier	Stadium: Letzigrund; Attendance: 9'500; Referee: Antonio Mateu Lahoz (Spain)

=== UEFA Europa League ===
Kickoff times are in CET

==== Play-off round ====
22 August 2013 1st Leg	Grasshopper Club Zurich (Switzerland)	1 – 2	(Italy) Fiorentina	Zürich, Switzerland
21:00	Gashi (yellow card) 57'; Anatole 64'	(Report) (in German)	13' Cuadrado; 46' (o.g.) Grichting; (yellow card) 87' Neto; (yellow card) 90+5' Ambrosini	Stadium: Letzigrund; Attendance: 15'033; Referee: Matej Jug (Slovenia)

29 August 2013 2nd Leg	Fiorentina (Italy)	0 – 1 (2 – 2 agg.)	(Switzerland) Grasshopper Club Zurich	Florence, Italy
21:00	Pasqual (yellow card) 59'; Neto (yellow card) 69'; Aquilani (yellow card) 87'; Iličić (yellow card) 90+3'	(Report) (in German)	(yellow card) 12' Pavlović; (yellow card) 45' Abrashi; 41' Ben Khalifa; (yellow card) 59' Salatić; (yellow card) 90' Toko	Stadium: Stadio Artemio Franchi; Attendance: 22'227; Referee: Ivan Bebek (Croatia)

== Squad ==
=== Squad, matches played and goals scored ===
No.	Name	Nationality	Position	Date of birth (age)	at GCZ since	Signed from	SL matches	SL goals	Cup matches	Cup goals	CL matches	CL goals	EL matches	EL goals
Goalkeepers
1	Roman Bürki	(Switzerland)	GK	14 November 1990 (age 35)	2011	Young Boys	34	0	4	0	2	0	2	0
18	Davide Taini	(Switzerland)	GK	7 December 1976 (age 49)	2011	Wil	2(3)	0	0	0	0	0	0	0
33	Timothy Dieng	(Switzerland)	GK	23 November 1994 (age 31)	2013	Grenchen	0	0	0	0	0	0	0	0
Defenders
2	Sead Hajrović	(Switzerland) (Bosnia and Herzegovina)	CB	4 June 1993 (age 33)	2013	Arsenal	0(2)	0	0	0	0	0	0	0
3	Stéphane Grichting	(Switzerland)	CB	30 March 1979 (age 47)	2012	Auxerre	31(1)	0	3	0	2	0	2	0
4	Milan Vilotić	(Serbia)	CB	21 October 1986 (age 40)	2012	Red Star Belgrade	13	2	3	1	2	0	2	0
4	Sanel Jahić	(Bosnia and Herzegovina) (France)	CB	10 December 1981 (age 44)	2014	St Johnstone	12(1)	0	0	0	0	0	0	0
5	Michael Lang	(Switzerland)	CB	8 February 1991 (age 35)	2011	St. Gallen	33(1)	3	3(1)	1	2	0	2	0
20	Daniel Pavlović	(Switzerland) (Croatia)	CB	22 April 1988 (age 38)	2011	1. FC Kaiserslautern	31	1	4	0	2	0	2	0
23	Michael Dingsdag	(Netherlands)	CB	18 October 1982 (age 44)	2013	Sion	17(3)	0	2	0	0	0	0	0
26	Ulisses Garcia	(Switzerland) (Portugal)	CB	1 November 1996 (age 30)	2011	Étoile Carouge	1	0	0	0	0	0	0	0
29	Levent Gülen	(Switzerland) (Turkey)	CB	24 February 1994 (age 32)	2012		0(1)	0	0	0	0	0	0	0
34	Moritz Bauer	(Switzerland)	CB	25 February 1992 (age 34)	2010		8(7)	0	1(2)	0	0	0	0	0
Midfielders
6	Vero Salatić	(Switzerland) (Serbia)	MF	14 November 1985 (age 40)	2012	Omonia	31	1	2	0	2	0	2	0
8	Amir Abrashi	(Albania) (Switzerland)	MF	27 March 1990 (age 36)	2012	Winterthur	30(2)	0	4	1	2	0	2	0
10	Shkëlzen Gashi	(Switzerland) (Kosovo)	MF	15 July 1988 (age 38)	2012	Aarau	23(8)	19	3	1	2	0	2	0
11	Frank Feltscher	(Switzerland) (Venezuela)	MF	17 May 1988 (age 38)	2011	Bellinzona	6(14)	1	1(3)	0	1(1)	0	0(1)	0
14	Izet Hajrović	(Switzerland) (Bosnia and Herzegovina)	MF	4 August 1991 (age 35)	2000		14(1)	6	2(2)	0	2	0	2	0
25	Steven Lang	(Switzerland)	MF	3 September 1987 (age 39)	2013	Servette	3(17)	1	2(1)	1	0	0	0	0
21	Caio	(Brazil)	MF	29 May 1986 (age 40)	2013	Atlético Goianiense	26(7)	13	3	1	0	0	0(2)	0
24	Imran Bunjaku	(Albania) (Switzerland)	MF	18 October 1992 (age 34)	2013		1(4)	0	0	0	0	0	0	0
27	Mergim Brahimi	(Switzerland) (Albania)	MF	8 August 1992 (age 34)	2001		0(1)	0	0(1)	0	0(1)	0	0	0
28	Toko Nzuzi	(Switzerland) (Democratic Republic of the Congo)	MF	20 December 1990 (age 35)	2003		27(5)	1	3	2	2	0	2	0
Forwards
9	Mu'nas Dabbur	(Israel)	ST	14 May 1992 (age 34)	2014	Maccabi Tel Aviv	14(1)	9	0	0	0	0	0	0
15	Nassim Ben Khalifa	(Switzerland) (Tunisia)	ST	13 January 1992 (age 34)	2012	Young Boys	24	5	2(2)	0	0	0	1(1)	1
17	Anatole Ngamukol	(France) (Equatorial Guinea)	ST	15 January 1988 (age 38)	2013	Thun	12(18)	3	3	1	1(1)	0	2	1
22	Johan Vonlanthen	(Switzerland) (Colombia)	ST	1 February 1986 (age 40)	2013		2(3)	0	0	0	0(2)	0	0(1)	0
30	Shani Tarashaj	(Switzerland)	ST	7 February 1995 (age 31)	2008		0	0	0	0	0	0	0	0

Last updated: 18 Mai 2014

Note: Numbers in parentheses denotes substitution appearances.

Players in italic left the club during the season

=== Transfers ===
Summer Transfers in
Name	Nationality	Position	Type	Moving from
Johan Vonlanthen	(Switzerland)	MF	Transfer	no club affiliation
Caio	(Brazil)	MF	Transfer	(Brazil) Atlético Goianiense
Michael Dingsdag	(Netherlands)	CB	Transfer	(Switzerland) Sion
Steven Lang	(Switzerland)	MF	loan return	(Switzerland) Servette

Summer Transfers out
Name	Nationality	Position	Type	Moving to
Uli Forte	(Switzerland) (Italy)	M	Transfer	(Switzerland) Young Boys
Remo Freuler	(Switzerland)	MF	Transfer	(Switzerland) Winterthur
João Paiva	(Portugal)	ST	Transfer	(Switzerland) Wohlen
Steven Zuber	(Switzerland)	MF	Transfer	(Russia) CSKA Moscow
Mohamed Coulibaly	(France) (Senegal)	MF	Transfer	(England) AFC Bournemouth
Andreas Hirzel	(Switzerland)	GK	loan return	(Switzerland) Aarau
Taulant Xhaka	(Switzerland)	MF	loan return	(Switzerland) Basel
Willian Rocha	(Brazil)	CB	loan return	(Brazil) Sport Recife
Gianluca Hossmann	(Switzerland)	CB	on loan	(Switzerland) Biel
Mergim Brahimi	(Switzerland) (Albania)	MF	on loan	(Switzerland) Aarau

Winter Transfers in
Name	Nationality	Position	Type	Moving from
Sanel Jahić	(Bosnia and Herzegovina) (France)	CB	Transfer	(Scotland) St Johnstone
Mu'nas Dabbur	(Israel)	FW	Transfer	(Israel) Maccabi Tel Aviv
Mergim Brahimi	(Switzerland) (Albania)	MF	loan return	(Switzerland) Aarau
Orhan Mustafi	(Switzerland) (Albania)	FW	loan return	(Scotland) Ross County

Winter Transfers out
Name	Nationality	Position	Type	Moving to
Izet Hajrović	(Bosnia and Herzegovina) (Switzerland)	MF	Transfer	(Turkey) Galatasaray
Milan Vilotić	(Serbia)	CB	Transfer	(Switzerland) Young Boys
Johan Vonlanthen	(Switzerland)	MF	on loan	(Switzerland) Schaffhausen
Levent Gülen	(Switzerland) (Turkey)	CB	on loan	(Turkey) Kayserispor
Orhan Mustafi	(Switzerland) (Albania)	FW	on loan	(Switzerland) Lugano
Mergim Brahimi	(Switzerland) (Albania)	MF	on loan	(Switzerland) Wohlen

== Coaching staff ==
Position	Staff
Manager	(Germany) Michael Skibbe
Assistant coach	(Romania) Zoltan Kadar
Fitness coach	(Switzerland) Alex Kern
Goalkeeper coach	(Switzerland) Christoph Born

Last updated: 17 June 2013
Source: GCZ Official Site
