= Nardo (disambiguation) =

Nardò is a small town and comune in the southern Italian region of Apulia.

Nardo may also refer to:

== People ==
- Nardo di Cione (died c. 1366), Italian painter, sculptor and architect
- Don Nardo (born 1947), American historian, composer and writer
- Giovanni Domenico Nardo (1802–1877), Italian naturalist
- Leonardo Colella (born 1930), Brazilian footballer also known as Nardo
- Nardo Wick (born 2001), American rapper

== Other uses ==
- A.C.D. Nardò, an Italian football club based in Nardò, Apulia
- Common Spanish name for the tuberose Agave amica (syn. Polianthes tuberosa)
- Volkswagen Nardo, a concept automobile
- Nardo, a former borough of Trondheim
- Nardo (Martian crater), an impact crater on Mars
- Elaine Nardo, a character on the TV series Taxi
- Nardò Ring, a high speed test track

== See also ==
- DiNardo, a list of people with the surname DiNardo or Di Nardo
