= DiNardo =

DiNardo or Di Nardo is a surname. Notable people with the surname include:

- Angelo Raffaele Dinardo (1932-2015), Italian politician
- Antonio Di Nardo (footballer, born 1979), Italian footballer
- Antonio Di Nardo (footballer, born 1998), Italian footballer
- Daniel DiNardo (born 1949), American Roman Catholic cardinal and archbishop
- Gerry DiNardo (born 1952), American former football player and coach
- Larry DiNardo (born 1949), American former football player
- Lenny DiNardo (born 1979), American former baseball pitcher
- Nancy DiNardo (born 1949–1950), American politician
- Pietro Di Nardo (born 1990), Swiss footballer

== See also ==
- Mariotto di Nardo (fl. 1388–1424), Florentine painter
