= Nzuzi Toko =

Congolese footballer (born 1990)

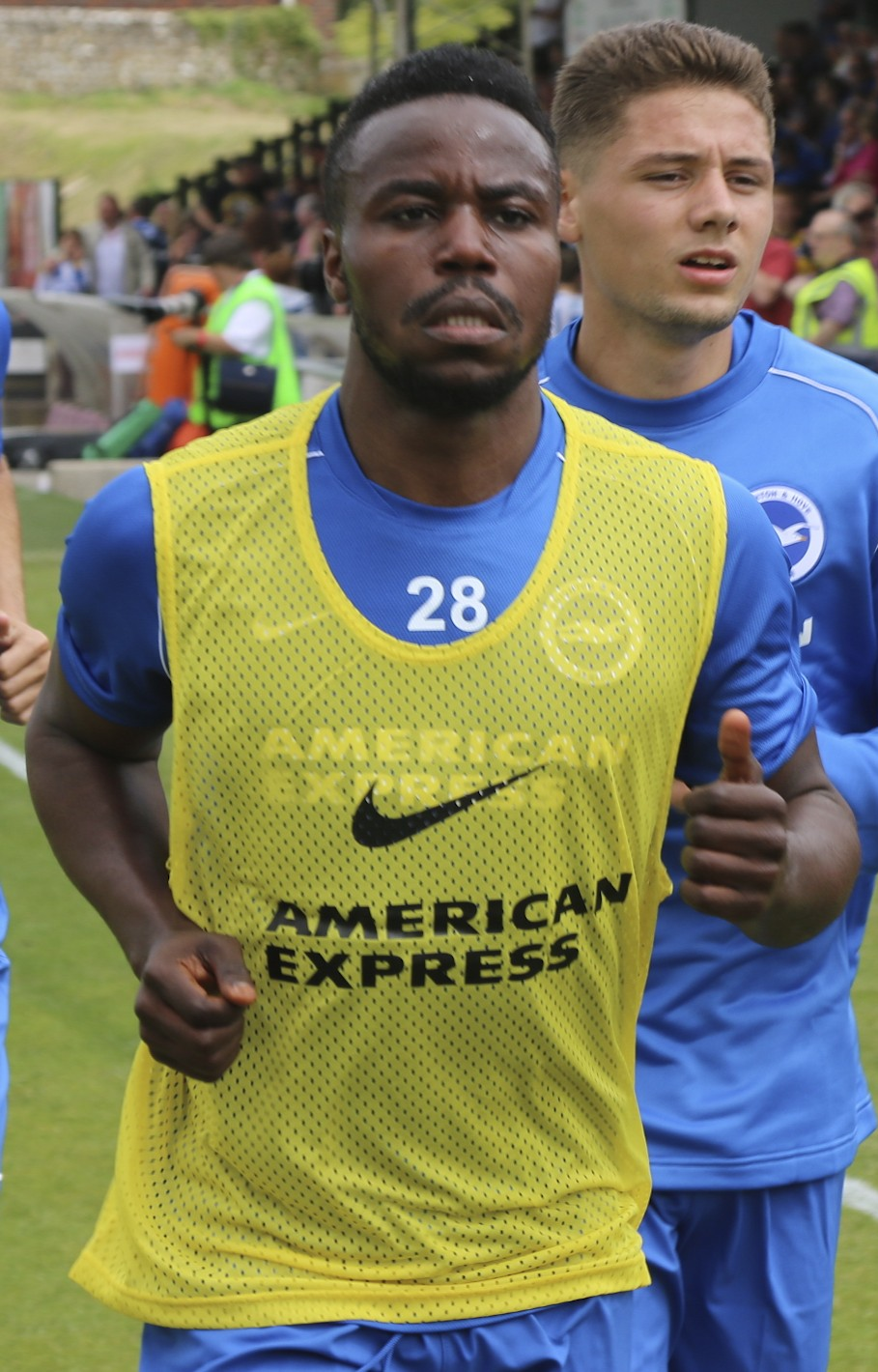
- Toko in 2014

Personal information
- Full name: Nzuzi Bundebele Toko
- Date of birth: 20 November 1990 (age 35)
- Place of birth: Kinshasa, Zaire
- Height: 1.71 m (5 ft 7 in)
- Position: Midfielder

Senior career*
Years	Team	Apps	(Gls)
2007–2008	Grasshoppers II	10	(1)
2008–2014	Grasshoppers	143	(7)
2014–2015	Brighton & Hove Albion	0	(0)
2015–2016	Eskişehirspor	31	(1)
2016–2018	St. Gallen	47	(2)
2018–2019	Al-Fateh	11	(1)
2019–2020	IFK Göteborg	21	(0)
2020–2022	Würzburger Kickers	15	(0)
2022–2024	FC Dietikon	18	(7)
2024–2025	YF Juventus	5	(2)
Total		301	(21)

International career^{‡}
2011–2012	Switzerland U21	13	(2)
2010–2015	DR Congo	4	(0)
- * Club domestic league appearances and goals as of 23 February 2023 ‡ National team caps and goals as of 23 February 2023

Nzuzi Bundebele Toko (born 20 November 1990) is a Congolese former professional footballer who played as a midfielder. He represented the DR Congo national team. Toko holds both Swiss and DR Congo nationality; he played youth international football for the former and senior international football for the latter.

He is best known for his time playing for Grasshopper Club Zürich, with whom he won the 2012–13 Swiss Cup.

== Early and personal life ==
Born in Kinshasa, Zaire, Toko moved to Switzerland at the age of four.

== Club career ==
Toko spent his early career in Switzerland for Grasshoppers II and Grasshoppers.

On 20 May 2014, Toko signed a three-year contract with English club Brighton & Hove Albion following the conclusion of his contract at Grasshoppers. His agent revealed that Toko had turned down a move to Russia.

On 20 January 2015, Toko agreed to mutually terminate his contract with Brighton after only eight months at the club. He signed for Turkish club Eskişehirspor the next day. He later played for St. Gallen and Al-Fateh, before signing with IFK Göteborg in March 2019.

Since August 2022, he played for FC Dietikon, in the 2. Liga Interregional, the fifth tier of Swiss football. On 22 February 2023, he announced his retirement from football. However, he also made three appearances for the club in March 2023.

== International career ==
Toko scored on his senior international début for the DR Congo national team in a 2–0 win over Saudi Arabia in May 2010. He played in two further games for DR Congo before switching allegiance to Switzerland, a 6–3 loss against Egypt in August 2010 and a 2–0 loss in Paris against Gabon in February 2011.

In March 2011, he chose to play for Switzerland and represented the Swiss under-21 team in games against Saudi Arabia and Qatar. He later represented the under-21 team during 2013 UEFA European Under-21 Football Championship qualification.

In December 2012, he was named in DR Congo's 28-man provisional squad for the 2013 Africa Cup of Nations. Although Toko did not make the final squad, he was later called up for DR Congo's 2014 FIFA World Cup qualification campaign. He played his first competitive game for DR Congo against Libya in March 2013.

== Career statistics ==
Appearances and goals by club, season and competition
Club	Season	League			Cup		Other		Total	
Club	Season	Division	Apps	Goals	Apps	Goals	Apps	Goals	Apps	Goals
Grasshoppers	2008–09	Swiss Super League	6	0	0	0	1 (Note: Appearance in UEFA Europa League)	0	7	0
Grasshoppers	2009–10	Swiss Super League	18	1	0	0	0	0	18	1
Grasshoppers	2010–11	Swiss Super League	29	2	1	0	1	0	31	2
Grasshoppers	2011–12	Swiss Super League	31	1	2	0	0	0	33	1
Grasshoppers	2012–13	Swiss Super League	26	2	2	1	0	0	28	3
Grasshoppers	2013–14	Swiss Super League	33	1	3	2	4 (Note: Two Appearances in both UEFA Champions League and UEFA Europa League)	0	40	3
Grasshoppers	Total		143	7	8	3	6	0	157	10
Brighton & Hove Albion	2014–15	Football League Championship	0	0	1	0	0	0	1	0
Eskişehirspor	2014–15	Süper Lig	13	1	3	0	0	0	16	1
Eskişehirspor	2015–16	Süper Lig	18	0	5	0	0	0	23	0
Eskişehirspor	Total		31	1	8	0	0	0	39	1
St. Gallen	2016–17	Swiss Super League	29	1	2	0	0	0	31	1
St. Gallen	2017–18	Swiss Super League	18	1	1	0	0	0	19	1
St. Gallen	Total		47	2	3	0	0	0	50	2
Al-Fateh	2018–19	Saudi Professional League	11	1	0	0	0	0	11	1
IFK Göteborg	2019	Allsvenskan	17	0	0	0	0	0	17	0
IFK Göteborg	2020	Allsvenskan	4	0	4	0	0	0	8	0
IFK Göteborg	Total		21	0	4	0	0	0	25	0
Würzburger Kickers	2020–21	2. Bundesliga	15	0	0	0	0	0	15	0
Würzburger Kickers	2021–22	3. Liga	0	0	0	0	0	0	0	0
Würzburger Kickers	Total		15	0	0	0	0	0	15	0
FC Dietikon	2022–23	2. Liga Interregional	10	5	—		—		10	5
Career total			278	16	24	3	6	0	308	19

== Honours ==
Grasshopper

- Swiss Cup: 2012–13
