= Javier Henares =

Spanish footballer (born 1985)

Personal information
- Full name: Javier Henares Payo
- Date of birth: 17 January 1985 (age 41)
- Place of birth: Málaga, Spain
- Position: Forward

Youth career
- 2001–2004: Málaga

Senior career*
Years	Team	Apps	(Gls)
2004	Málaga B	0	(0)
2004–2005	Alhaurino		(4)
2005–2006	Albacete B	10	(0)
2006–2007	Hamilton Academical	3	(0)
2006	→ Alloa Athletic (loan)	6	(1)
2007	Antequera	18	(3)
2007	Jerez	7	(1)
2007–2008	Arcos	26	(7)
2008–2009	Alhaurino	13	(7)
2009	Los Barrios	21	(5)
2009–2010	Alhaurino	9	(0)
2010–2011	Marbella	28	(7)
2011–2013	Yverdon-Sport	31	(13)
2012	→ Serrières (loan)	14	(2)
2013–2014	Stade Nyonnais	25	(13)
2014	UCAM Murcia	11	(2)
2014–2015	Antequera	23	(12)
2015–2016	El Palo	31	(13)
2016–2017	Alhaurín Torre	22	(10)
2017	Zenit Torremolinos	3	(2)
2017–2018	Ciudad Lucena	60	(22)
2018	Zenit Torremolinos	3	(3)
2019–2020	Ciudad de Lucena	26	(14)
2020	Juventud Torremolinos	7	(2)
- * Club domestic league appearances and goals

Javier Henares Payo (born 17 January 1985) is a Spanish former professional footballer who played as a forward.

== Career ==
Born in Málaga, Andalusia, Henares made his senior debut with CD Alhaurino in 2004, in Tercera División. After representing Atlético Malagueño and Albacete Balompié B, he moved to Scotland with Hamilton Academical in 2006.

Henares made his professional debut on 5 August 2006, coming on as a second-half substitute for Richard Offiong in a 6–0 First Division away loss against Gretna. He scored his first goal for the club ten days later, netting his side's second in a 3–1 home win against Berwick Rangers for the League Cup.

In October 2006, Henares was loaned to Second Division side Alloa Athletic until January. He made his debut for the club on 21 October, scoring the winner in a 2–1 away success over Peterhead.

In January 2007, Henares returned to his home country after agreeing to a contract with Antequera CF in the fourth level. He subsequently represented Jerez CF, Arcos CF, CD Alhaurino (two stints), UD Los Barrios and Marbella FC in the same category before moving to Switzerland with Yverdon-Sport FC.

On 23 January 2014, after stints at FC Serrières and FC Stade Nyonnais, Henares signed for UCAM Murcia CF in the fourth division. He would resume his career in the lower leagues in the following years, representing Antequera, CD El Palo, Alhaurín de la Torre CF, CD Zenit de Torremolinos and CD Ciudad de Lucena.
