= Alexandre Veuthey =

Swiss footballer (born 1993)

Personal information
- Date of birth: 14 January 1993 (age 33)
- Place of birth: Switzerland
- Height: 1.83 m (6 ft 0 in)
- Position: Defender

Team information
- Current team: Nyon
- Number: 4

Youth career
- 2008–2010: Lausanne-Sport

Senior career*
Years	Team	Apps	(Gls)
2010–2012	Lausanne-Sport	1	(0)
2012–2013	Nyon	39	(0)
- * Club domestic league appearances and goals as of 8 January 2012

Alexandre Veuthey (born 14 January 1993) is a Swiss professional footballer currently playing for FC Stade Nyonnais.

== Career ==
Veuthey began playing at FC Lausanne-Sport where he rose through the youth ranks. He eventually made his debut on 12 May 2010 against Gossau in a league match. In July 2012 he moved on to FC Stade Nyonnais on a free transfer.
