= Steven Lang (footballer) =

Swiss footballer (born 1987)

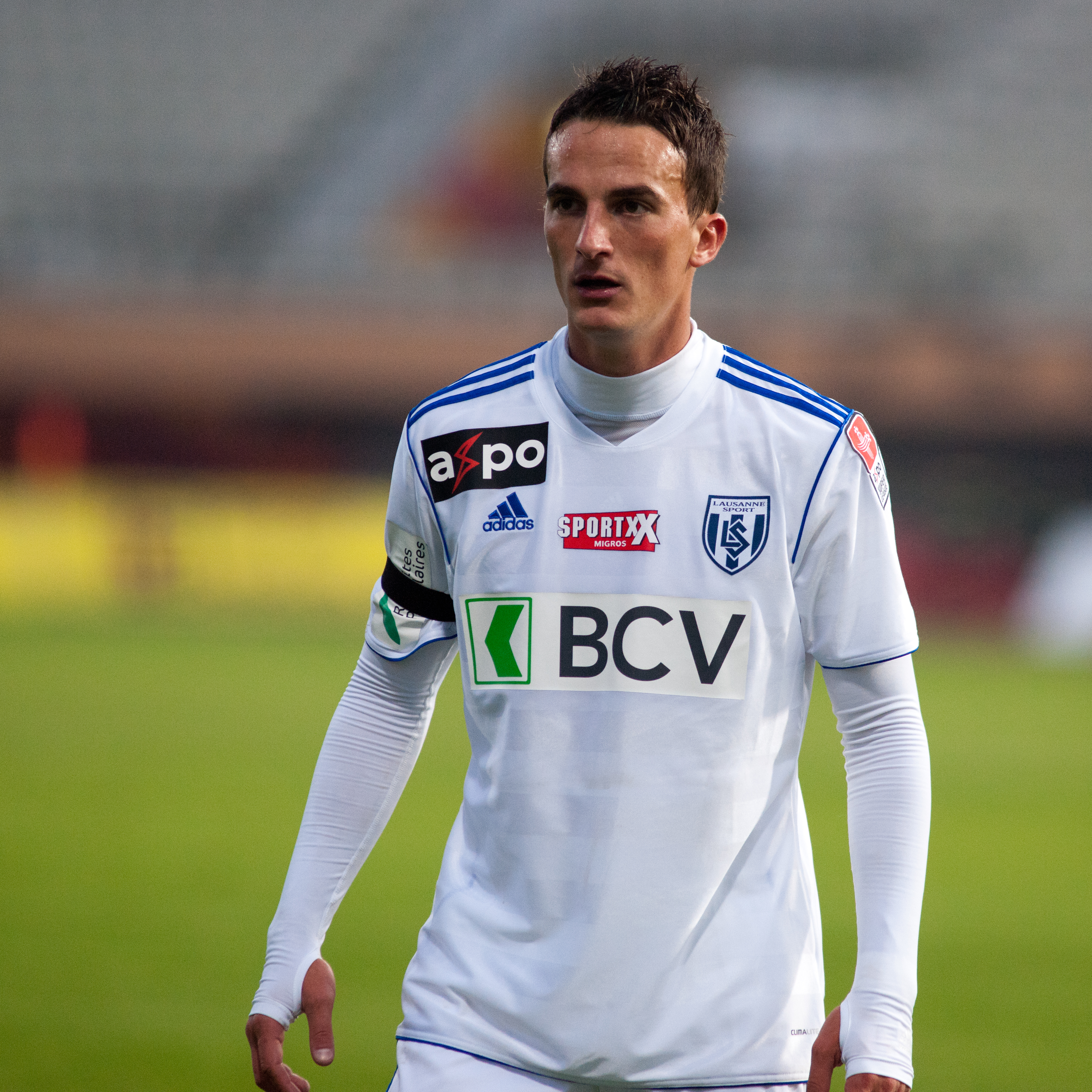

Personal information
- Date of birth: 3 September 1987 (age 39)
- Place of birth: Delémont, Switzerland
- Height: 1.74 m (5 ft 8 1/2 in)
- Positions: Forward; left midfielder

Youth career
- Basel
- Nantes

Senior career*
Years	Team	Apps	(Gls)
2005–2007	Nantes B	31	(1)
2007–2008	Neuchâtel Xamax	24	(2)
2008–2010	FC Aarau	57	(5)
2010–2014	Grasshopper	42	(1)
2011–2012	→ Lausanne-Sport (loan)	30	(4)
2012–2013	→ Servette (loan)	24	(2)
2014–2015	Vaduz	33	(2)
2015–2017	FC St. Gallen	28	(1)
2017	→ FC Schaffhausen (loan)	17	(14)
2017–2020	Servette FC	38	(7)

International career
2008	Switzerland U-20	1	(0)
- * Club domestic league appearances and goals

Steven Lang (born 3 September 1987) is a Swiss former footballer who played as a forward or left midfielder.
