= Mario Sara =

Austrian footballer

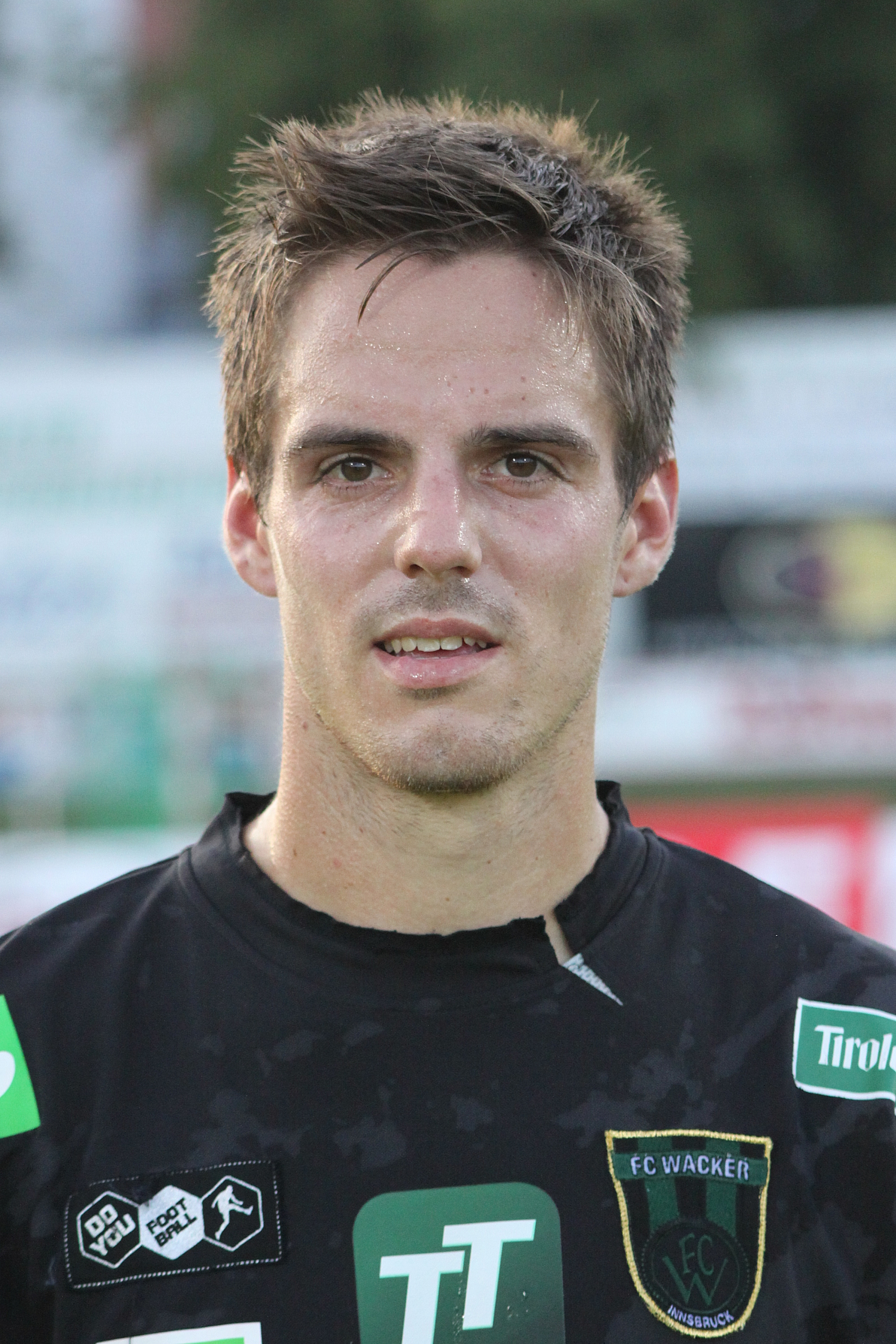
- Sara in 2009

Personal information
- Full name: Mario Sara
- Date of birth: 21 December 1982 (age 43)
- Place of birth: Vienna, Austria
- Height: 1.80 m (5 ft 11 in)
- Position: Midfielder

Team information
- Current team: SC Ritzing
- Number: 22

Youth career
- –1999: FK Austria Wien

Senior career*
Years	Team	Apps	(Gls)
1999–2000	FK Austria Wien II	20	(4)
2000–2001	WSG Wattens	25	(3)
2001–2002	Tirol Innsbruck	2	(0)
2002–04	FC Lustenau	44	(4)
2004–06	SC Rheindorf Altach	34	(5)
2006–08	SK Rapid Wien	16	(0)
2008–10	FC Wacker Innsbruck	63	(3)
2010–2015	FC Vaduz	129	(10)
2015–	SC Ritzing	28	(10)
- * Club domestic league appearances and goals as of 12 August 2011

Mario Sara (born 21 February in Vienna, Austria) is a football midfielder.

During his club career, Sara has played for Tirol Innsbruck, FC Lustenau, SC Rheindorf Altach, SK Rapid Wien, FC Wacker Innsbruck and FC Vaduz.
