= Luca Radice =

Swiss footballer (born 1987)

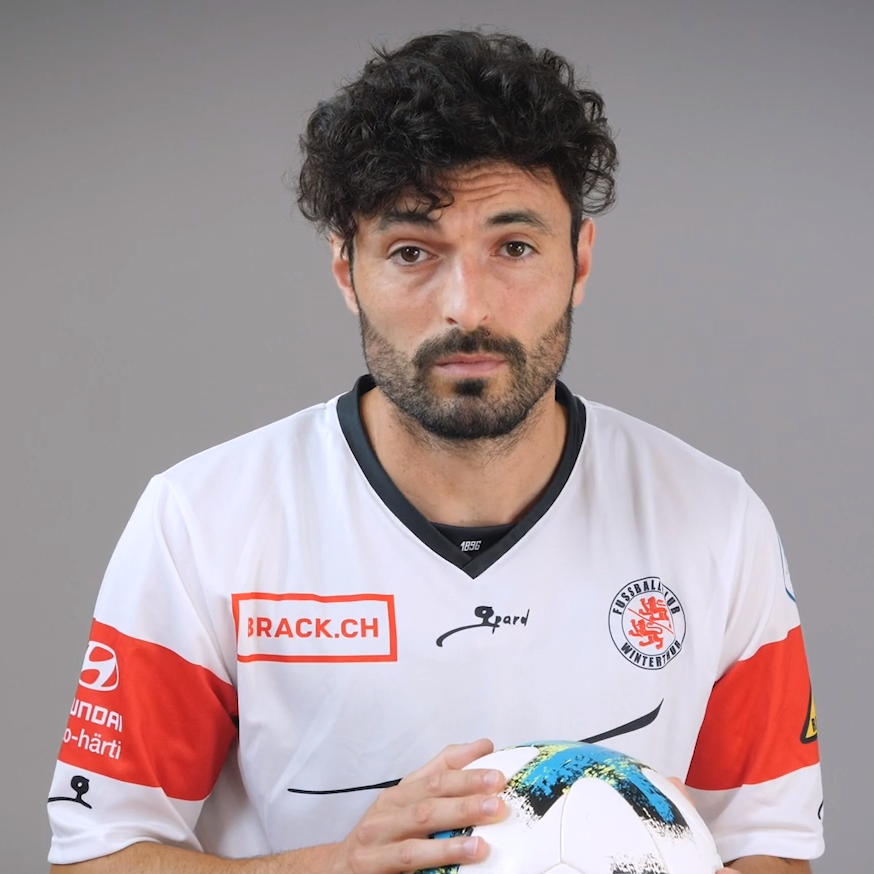
- Radice in 2018

Personal information
- Date of birth: 9 April 1987 (age 39)
- Place of birth: Switzerland
- Position: Midfielder

Senior career*
| Years | Team | Apps | (Gls) |
| 2004–2006 | Inter Club Zurigo | | |
| 2006–2013 | Winterthur | 125 | (10) |
| 2014–2016 | Aarau | 77 | (6) |
| 2016–2020 | Winterthur | 119 | (16) |
| 2020–2021 | Rapperswil-Jona | | |
- * Club domestic league appearances and goals

Luca Radice (born 9 April 1987) is a Swiss former footballer who played as a midfielder.

== Career ==
In 2014, Radice signed for Swiss side Aarau. He was described as having "not cut a happy figure under the leadership of the two coaches Livio Bordoli and Marco Schällibaum" while playing for the club. In 2016, Radice returned to Swiss side Winterthur. He was regarded as one of the club's most important players.

== Style of play ==
Radice mainly operates as a midfielder. He has also operated as a winger while playing for Swiss side Aarau.
