= Pietro Di Nardo =

Swiss footballer (born 1990)

Personal information
- Full name: Pietro Di Nardo
- Date of birth: 8 February 1990 (age 36)
- Place of birth: Biel/Bienne, Switzerland
- Height: 1.76 m (5 ft 9 in)
- Position: Midfielder

Youth career
- Neuchâtel Xamax
- 2007–2008: Young Boys

Senior career*
Years	Team	Apps	(Gls)
2008–2009	Thun	9	(0)
2009–2014	Biel-Bienne	132	(7)
2014–2019	Neuchâtel Xamax	123	(3)
2020	Yverdon-Sport	0	(0)

International career^{‡}
2005	Switzerland U16	1	(1)
2005–2006	Switzerland U17	5	(0)
2008	Switzerland U18	1	(0)
2008–2009	Switzerland U19	3	(0)
- * Club domestic league appearances and goals ‡ National team caps and goals as of 21:35, 16 September 2019 (UTC)

Pietro Di Nardo (born 8 February 1990) is a Swiss professional footballer who plays as a midfielder for the Swiss club Neuchâtel Xamax FCS.

== Professional career ==
Di Nardo joined Neuchâtel Xamax on 7 June 2014, after a couple of years with FC Biel-Bienne and FC Thun in the Swiss Challenge League. On 29 March 2018 at the age of 28, Di Nardo signed his first professional contract after helping Xamax get promoted into the Swiss Super League. Di Nardo made his professional debut in a 2-0 Swiss Super League win over FC Luzern on 21 July 2018.

On 7 January 2020, Di Nardo moved to Yverdon-Sport FC. However, he was not used in any officiel games, as the club's president, Mario Di Pietrantonio, expressed, that he wasn't convinced by Di Nardo since his arrival. Therefore, he left the club at the end of the season.

== International career ==
Di Nardo was born in Switzerland and is of Italian and Portuguese descents. He was a youth international for Switzerland.

== Honours ==
- Swiss Challenge League (1): 2016-17
- Swiss Promotion League (1): 2014-15
